= 7th Central Committee of the Workers' Party of Korea =

2016–2021 North Korean government body

7th Central Committee
- Emblem of the Workers' Party of North Korea

9 May 2016 – 10 January 2021 (4 years, 246 days) Overview
- Type: Central Committee of the Workers' Party of Korea
- Election: 7th Congress

Leadership
- Chairman: Kim Jong Un
- Vice Chairmen: 9 (2016)
- Presidium: 5 (2016)
- Politburo: 19 full (2016); 9 alt. (2016)
- Control organ: 7 (2016)

Members
- Total: 129

Alternates
- Total: 106

The 7th Central Committee of the Workers' Party of Korea was elected by the 7th Congress on 9 May 2016, and remained in session until the election of the 8th Central Committee on 10 January 2021. In between party congresses and specially convened conferences the Central Committee is the highest decision-making institution in the WPK and North Korea. The Central Committee is not a permanent institution and delegates day-to-day work to elected bodies, such as the Presidium, the Politburo, the Executive Policy Bureau, the Central Military Commission and the Control Commission in the case of the 7th Central Committee. It convenes meetings, known as "Plenary Session of the [term] Central Committee", to discuss major policies. Only full members have the right to vote, but if a full member cannot attend a plenary session, the person's spot is taken over by an alternate. Plenary session can also be attended by non-members, such meetings are known as "Enlarged Plenary Session", to participate in the committee's discussions.

On its election the 7th Central Committee was composed of 129 full members and 106 alternate members.

== Plenary meetings ==
- 1st Plenary Meeting: 9 May 2016
- 2nd Plenary Meeting: 7 October 2017
- 3rd Plenary Meeting: 20 April 2018
- 4th Plenary Meeting: 10 April 2019
- 5th Plenary Meeting: 28–31 December 2019
- 6th Plenary Meeting: 19 August 2020

== Composition ==
=== Members ===
The following were elected as members of the 7th Central Committee.

The names of members are listed according to the order of their election at the 7th Congress. Members who have an en dash (—) in the Rank column were by-elected during the term of the 7th Central Committee.

Rank	Name	Korean	6th (Note: Status in the 6th Central Committee at the 3rd Conference.)	8th (Note: Status in the 8th Central Committee at the start of its term.)
1	Kim Jong Un	김정은	Member	Member
2	Kim Yong-nam	김영남	Member	No
3	Hwang Pyong-so	황병서	Alternate	No
4	Choe Ryong-hae	최룡해	Member	Member
5	Pak Pong-ju	박봉주	Alternate	No
6	Kim Ki-nam	김기남	Member	No
7	Choe Thae-bok	최태복	Member	No
8	Ri Yong-mu	리용무	Member	No
9	O Kuk-ryol	오극렬	Member	No
10	Ri Myong-su	리명수	Member	No
11	Kang Sok-ju (Note: Kang Sok-ju died on 20 May 2016.)	강석주	Member	No
12	Kwak Pom-gi	곽범기	Member	No
13	O Su-yong	오수용	Member	Member
14	Kim Yong-chol	김영철	Member	Member
15	Yang Hyong-sop	양형섭	Member	No
16	Kim Won-hong	김원홍	Member	No
17	Kim Phyong-hae	김평해	Member	No
18	Pak Yong-sik	박영식	No	No
19	Ro Tu-chol	로두철	Member	No
20	Choe Pu-il	최부일	Member	No
21	Jo Yon-jun	조연준	No	No
22	Kim Yong-jin	김용진	Member	No
23	Im Chol-ung	임철웅	No	No
24	Kim Tok-hun	김덕훈	No	Member
25	Ri Mu-yong	리무영	Member	No
26	Ri Chol-man	리철만	No	Member
27	Ri Il-hwan	리일환	No	Member
28	Ri Man-gon	리만건	Member	No
29	An Jong-su	안정수	Member	No
30	Choe Sang-gon (Note: Choe Sang-gon was recalled as a member. He returned as a member by being directly by-elected on 31 December 2019.)	최상건	No	Member
31	Ri Yong-rae	리영래	No	No
32	Kim Jong-im	김정임	Member	No
33	Kim Jung-hyop	김중협	No	No
34	Kim Man-song	김만성	No	No
35	Hong In-bom	홍인범	Member	No
36	Kim Kyong-ok	김경옥	Member	No
37	Ri Jae-il	리재일	Alternate	No
38	Choe Hwi	최휘	No	Member
39	Ri Pyong-chol	리병철	Member	Member
40	Kim Yong-su (Note: Recalled as a member.)	김용수	No	Member
41	Jo Yong-won	조용원	No	Member
42	Ri Yong-sik	리영식	No	Member
43	Kim Yo Jong	김여정	No	Member
44	Hong Sung-mu	홍승무	Alternate	Member
45	Pak To-chun	박도춘	Member	No
46	Kim Yong-chun (Note: Kim Yong-chun died on 16 August 2018.)	김영춘	Member	No
47	Hyon Chol-hae	현철해	Member	No
48	Ri Yong-gil	리영길	Member	Member
49	So Hong-chan	서홍찬	No	Member
50	Kim Jong-gak	김정각	Member	No
51	No Kwang-chol	노광철	Alternate	Member
52	Kim Jong-gwan	김정관	No	Member
53	Yun Tong-hyon	윤동현	Member	No
54	Kim Hyong-ryong	김형룡	Member	No
55	Jo Nam-jin	조남진	No	No
56	Ryom Chol-song	렴철성	No	No
57	Jo Kyong-chol	조경철	Member	Member
58	Pak Jong-chon	박정천	No	Member
59	Yun Yong-sik	윤영식	No	No
60	Kim Rak-gyom	김락겸	No	No
61	Ri Yong-ju	리용주	Alternate	No
62	Choe Yong-ho	최영호	No	No
63	Wi Song-il	위성일	No	Member
64	Pang Tu-sop	방두섭	No	Member
65	Ri Song-guk	리성국	No	Alternate
66	Yang Tong-hun	양동훈	Member	No
67	Ri Thae-sop	리태섭	Alternate	Member
68	Pak Su-il	박수일	No	Member
69	Kim Sang-ryong	김상룡	No	No
70	Kim Kum-chol	김금철	No	Member
71	Kim Yong-bok	김영복	No	Member
72	Kim Myong-nam	김명남	No	No
73	Kim Song-chol	김송철	Member	No
74	Ri Chang-han	리창한	Alternate	No
75	Han Chang-sun	한창순	Alternate	No
76	Yun Jong-rin	윤정린	Member	No
77	Kim Song-dok	김성덕	Member	No
78	Ri Yong-hwan	리용환	Member	No
79	Ro Kyong-jun	로경준	Alternate	No
80	Choe Yong-rim	최영림	Member	No
81	Hong Son-ok	홍선옥	No	No
82	Kim Yong-ho	김영호	Alternate	No
83	Jo Chun-ryong (Note: Jo Chun-ryong was recalled as a member. He returned as a member by being directly by-elected on 10 April 2019.)	조춘룡	No	No
84	Kim Chol-man	김철만	Member	No
85	Ri Su-yong	리수용	Alternate	No
86	Kim Man-su	김만수	No	No
87	Jang Hyok	장혁	No	No
88	Tong Jong-ho	동정호	Alternate	No
89	Ri Ryong-nam	리룡남	Member	Alternate
90	Kim Sung-du	김승두	No	Member
91	Jang Ki-ho	장기호	No	Member
92	Jang Chol	장철	Member	No
93	Kim Jong-suk	김정숙	Member	No
94	Kim Kye-gwan	김계관	Alternate	No
95	Kim Tong-il	김동일	Alternate	Alternate
96	Jang Chang-ha	장창하	No	Member
97	Ri Hong-sop	리홍섭	Alternate	Member
98	Ri Yong-ho	리용호	Alternate	No
99	Ju Yong-sik	주영식	Member	No
100	Jon Yong-nam	전용남	No	No
101	Jang Pyong-gyu	장병규	Member	No
102	Jang Jong-nam	장정남	No	Member
103	Kang Phil-hun	강필훈	No	No
104	Kim Su-gil	김수길	No	Member
105	Pak Thae-song	박태성	No	Member
106	Kang Yang-mo	강양모	Member	No
107	Kim Nung-o	김능오	No	No
108	Pak Yong-ho	박영호	No	No
109	Pak Thae-dok (Note: Pak Thae-dok was recalled as a member. He returned as a member by being directly by-elected on 13 August 2020.)	박태덕	Member	Member
110	Kim Jae-ryong	김재룡	No	Member
111	Pak Jong-nam	박정남	No	Member
112	Jon Sung-hun	전승훈	No	No
113	Kim Song-il	김성일	No	No
114	Ri Sang-won	리상원	No	No
115	Rim Kyong-man	림경만	Member	Member
116	Thae Jong-su	태종수	Member	No
117	Ri Kwang-chol	리광철	No	Member
118	Jon Kyong-son	전경선	Alternate	No
119	O Mun-hyon	오문현	No	No
120	Pak Jong-gun	박종근	Member	No
121	Choe Yong-dok	최영덕	Member	No
122	Ri Jong-sik	리종식	Alternate	No
123	Ko Pyong-hyon	고병현	Member	No
124	Ri Pong-dok	리봉덕	Member	No
125	Jong In-guk	정인국	Member	No
126	Choe Myong-chol	최명철	No	No
127	Thae Hyong-chol	태형철	Alternate	Member
128	Hong So-han	홍서헌	Alternate	No
129	Jon Il-ho	전일호	No	Member
—	Kim Pyong-ho (Note: By-elected as a member on 7 October 2017, from alternate members.)	김병호	Member	Member
—	Kim Myong-sik	김명식	No	Member
—	Kim Jong-sik	김정식	No	Member
—	Choe Tu-yong	최두용	No	Member
—	Ri Ju-o (Note: Directly by-elected as a member on 7 October 2017.)	리주오	No	No
—	Jon Kwang-ho	전광호	No	No
—	Ko In-ho	고인호	No	No
—	Choe Tong-myong	최동명	No	Member
—	Ryang Won-ho	량원호	No	No
—	Kim Kwang-hyok	김광혁	No	Member
—	Hong Yong-chil	홍영칠	No	No
—	Kim Myong-gil	김명길	No	No
—	Kim Tu-il	김두일	No	Member
—	Ryang Jong-hun	량정훈	No	No
—	Ri Hi-yong	리히용	No	Member
—	Ho Chol-yong	허철용	No	No
—	Sin Yong-chol (Note: By-elected as a member on 20 April 2018, from alternate members.)	신영철	No	Member
—	Son Chol-ju	손철주	No	No
—	Jang Kil-song	장길성	No	No
—	Kim Song-nam	김성남	No	Member
—	Kim Jun-son (Note: Directly by-elected as a member on 20 April 2018.)	김준선	No	No
—	Kim Chang-son	김창선	No	No
—	Jong Yong-guk	정영국	No	No
—	Ri Tu-song	리두성	No	Member
—	Sin Ryong-man (Note: By-elected as a member on 10 April 2019, from alternate members.)	신룡만	No	Member
—	Hyon Song-wol	현송월	No	Member
—	Mun Myong-hak	문명학	No	No
—	Kim Chung-gol	김충걸	Alternate	Member
—	Jang Kil-ryong	장길룡	No	No
—	Pak Hun	박훈	No	Member
—	Kwon Song-ho	권성호	No	No
—	Choe Il-ryong	최일룡	No	No
—	Song Chun-sop	송춘섭	No	Member
—	Kim Yong-jae	김영재	Alternate	No
—	Ri Chung-gil	리충길	No	Member
—	Kang Yun-sok	강윤석	No	Member
—	Ho Yong-chun	허영춘	No	No
—	Ro Kwang-sop (Note: Directly-elected as a member on 10 April 2019.)	로광섭	No	No
—	Kang Pong-hun	강봉훈	No	Member
—	Choe Son-hui	최선희	No	Alternate
—	Mun Kyong-dok	문경덕	Member	Member
—	Pak Chang-ho	박창호	No	Member
—	Kim Chol-sam	김철삼	No	Member
—	Jang Kum-chol	장금철	No	No
—	Kim Jo-guk	김조국	No	Member
—	Han Kwang-sang (Note: By-elected as a member on 31 December 2019, from alternate members.)	한광상	No	No
—	Kang Jong-gwan	강종관	No	Member
—	Kim Kwang-chol	김광철	No	Member
—	Kim Kyong-jun	김경준	No	Member
—	Yang Sung-ho	양승호	No	Member
—	Kwak Chang-sik	곽창식	No	Member
—	Pak Kwang-ju	박광주	No	Member
—	Pak Myong-su	박명수	No	Member
—	Ri Pong-chun	리봉춘	No	Member
—	Song Sok-won	송석원	No	Member
—	O Il-jong (Note: Directly-elected as a member on 31 December 2019.)	오일정	Member	Member
—	Kim Yong-hwan	김영환	No	Member
—	Kim Jong-ho	김정호	No	No
—	Son Yong-hun	손영훈	No	No
—	Rim Kwang-il	림광일	No	Member
—	Ri Thae-il (Note: By-elected as a member on 11 April 2020, from alternate members.)	리태일	No	Member
—	Ri Son-gwon	리선권	No	Member
—	Jon Hak-chol	전학철	No	Member
—	Kim Chol	김철	No	No
—	Pak Myong-sun (Note: Directly by-elected as a member on 11 April 2020.)	박명순	No	Member
—	Ko Kil-son (Note: By-elected as a member on 7 June 2020, from alternate members.)	고길선	No	Member
—	Kim Jong-nam	김정남	No	Member
—	Song Yong-gon	송영건	No	Member
—	Ri Jae-nam (Note: Directly by-elected as a member on 7 June 2020.)	리재남	No	Member
—	Kwon Thae-yong	권태영	No	Member
—	Kwon Yong-jin	권영진	No	Member

=== Alternate members ===
The following were elected as alternate members of the 7th Central Committee.

The names of alternate members are listed according to the order of their election at the 7th Congress. Alternate members who have an en dash (—) in the Rank column were by-elected during the term of the 7th Central Committee.

Rank	Name	Korean	6th (Note: Status in the 6th Central Committee at the 3rd Conference.)	8th (Note: Status in the 8th Central Committee at the start of its term.)
1	Jon Il-chun	전일춘	No	No
2	Kim Song-nam	김성남	No	Member
3	Jong Myong-hak	정명학	Alternate	No
4	Kim Hi-thaek	김히택	Member	No
5	Kang Kwan-il	강관일	Alternate	No
6	Kim Sung-yon	김승연	No	No
7	Kim Pyong-ho (Note: By-elected as a member on 7 October 2017.)	김병호	Member	Member
8	Kim Jong-sik	김정식	No	Member
9	Yun Tong-chol	윤동철	No	No
10	Tong Yong-il	동영일	Alternate	No
11	Han Kwang-sang	한광상	No	No
12	Choe Tu-yong	최두용	No	Member
13	Ri Pong-chun	리봉춘	No	Member
14	Song Sok-won	송석원	No	Member
15	Kang Sun-nam	강순남	No	Member
16	Song Yong-gon	송영건	No	Member
17	Ko Myong-su	고명수	No	Alternate
18	Kim Kwang-su	김광수	No	No
19	Ho Song-il	허성일	No	No
20	Ri Yong-chol	리영철	No	Member
21	Ri Chol	리철	Alternate	No
22	Kim Kwang-hyok	김광혁	No	No
23	Ho Yong-chun	허영춘	No	No
24	Son Chol-ju	손철주	No	No
25	Jang Tong-un	장동운	No	No
26	Cha Kyong-il	차경일	Alternate	No
27	O Kum-chol	오금철	Member	Alternate
28	Kim Myong-sik	김명식	No	Member
29	Kang Ki-sop	강기섭	Alternate	No
30	Ri Kuk-jun	리국준	Alternate	No
31	Song Jun-sol	송준설	No	No
32	Mun Myong-hak	문명학	No	No
33	Kim Yong-gwang	김용광	Alternate	No
34	Kang Jong-gwan	강종관	No	Member
35	Ri Hak-chol	리학철	No	No
36	Ri Chun-sam	리춘삼	No	No
37	Ko Kil-son	고길선	No	Member
38	Han Ryong-guk	한룡국	No	Alternate
39	Ri Jong-guk	리종국	No	No
40	Kim Jae-song	김재성	No	No
41	Kim Kwang-chol	김광철	No	Member
42	Kwon Song-ho	권성호	No	No
43	Choe Il-ryong	최일룡	No	No
44	Jo Yong-chol	조영철	Alternate	Member
45	Kang Yong-chol	강영철	No	No
46	Ki Kwang-ho	기광호	No	No
47	Kim Kyong-jun	김경준	No	Member
48	Kang Yong-su	강영수	No	No
49	Mun Ung-jo	문응조	No	No
50	Kang Ha-guk	강하국	No	No
51	Pak Chun-nam	박춘남	No	No
52	Ri Jong-mo	리종무	No	No
53	Ri Chung-gil	리충길	No	Member
54	Kim Chon-gyu	김천균	No	No
55	Wang Chang-uk	왕창욱	No	Alternate
56	Yu Chol-u	유철우	No	No
57	Paek Pong-son	백봉선	No	No
58	Pak Won-hak	박원학	No	No
59	Ri Hye-jong	리혜정	No	No
60	An Tong-chun	안동춘	Alternate	No
61	Ri Chan-hwa	리찬화	Alternate	Alternate
62	Hwang Sun-hui (Note: Hwang Sun-hui died on 17 January 2020.)	황순희	Alternate	No
63	Ju Kyu-chang	주규창	Member	No
64	Kim Tu-il	김두일	No	No
65	Kang Pong-hun (Note: Recalled as an alternate member.)	강봉훈	No	Member
66	Ri Sung-ho	리승호	No	Alternate
67	Ju Yong-gil	주영길	No	No
68	Ri Myong-gil	리명길	Alternate	No
69	Kim Jong-sun	김정순	No	No
70	Kang Yun-sok	강윤석	No	Member
71	Sin Un-hak	신운학	No	No
72	Kim Hyong-jun	김형준	No	No
73	Ji Jae-ryong	지재룡	Alternate	No
74	Cha Hui-rim	차희림	No	No
75	Kang Hyong-bong	강형봉	Alternate	Alternate
76	Kim Yong-chol	김영철	No	Alternate
77	Kim Tong-il	김동일	Alternate	Alternate
78	Yun Jae-hyok	윤재혁	No	Member
79	Pak Chang-bom	박창범	Alternate	No
80	Ham Se-jin	함세진	No	Alternate
81	O Chun-yong	오춘영	No	Alternate
82	Cha Jin-sun	차진순	Alternate	No
83	Choe Pong-ho	최봉호	Alternate	No
84	Jong Mong-phil	정몽필	Alternate	No
85	Ri Chang-gil	리창길	No	Alternate
86	Jang Kyong-chol	장경철	No	Alternate
87	Ri Song-gwon	리성권	Alternate	No
88	Yang Sung-ho (Note: Yang Sung-ho was recalled as an alternate member. He returned as an alternate member on 10 April 2019, and was later by-elected as a member on 31 December 2019.)	양승호	No	Member
89	Song Kwang-chol	송광철	No	No
90	Jo Hyon-mun	조현문	No	No
91	Kim Chung-gol	김충걸	Alternate	Member
92	Han Song-nam	한성남	No	Alternate
93	Song Ki-chol	송기철	No	No
94	Choe Chan-gon	최찬건	Alternate	No
95	Kim Kwang-nam	김광남	No	No
96	Myong Song-chol	명송철	No	Alternate
97	Rim Chun-song	림춘성	No	No
98	Ri Hyong-gun (Note: Ri Hyong-gun was recalled as an alternate member. He returned as an alternate member by being by-elected on 10 April 2019.)	리형근	No	No
99	Jang Myong-hak	장명학	Alternate	No
100	Kim Sung-il	김승일	No	No
101	Jong Il-man	정일만	No	No
102	Kim Myong-sik	김명식	No	Member
103	Kim Chol-su	김철수	No	Alternate
104	Yang Son-yong	명선영	No	No
105	Ho Kwang-il	허광일	No	Alternate
106	Ri Min-chol	리민철	Alternate	Alternate
—	Sin Ryong-man (Note: Sin Ryong-man was by-elected as an alternate member on 7 October 2017, and as a member on 10 April 2019.)	신룡만	No	Member
—	Sin Yong-chol (Note: Sin Yong-chol was by-elected as an alternate member on 7 October 2017, and as a member on 20 April 2018.)	신영철	No	Member
—	Jang Kil-song (Note: Jang Kil-song was by-elected as an alternate member on 7 October 2017, and as a member on 20 April 2018.)	장길성	No	No
—	Ju Song-nam (Note: By-elected as an alternate member on 7 October 2017.)	주성남	No	No
—	Rim Kwang-ung	림광웅	No	Alternate
—	Jang Ryong-sik	장룡식	No	Member
—	Kim Yong-ho	김용호	No	Alternate
—	Hyon Song-wol (Note: Hyon Song-wol was by-elected as an alternate member on 7 October 2017, and as a member on 10 April 2019.)	현송월	No	Member
—	Ma Won-chun	마원춘	No	No
—	Ryom Chol-su	렴철수	No	No
—	Song Chun-sop (Note: Song Chun-sop was by-elected as an alternate member on 7 October 2017, and as a member on 10 April 2019.)	송춘섭	No	Member
—	Jang Jun-sang	장준상	No	No
—	Kim Yong-jae (Note: Kim Yong-jae was by-elected as an alternate member on 7 October 2017, and as a member on 10 April 2019.)	김영재	Alternate	No
—	Kim Chun-do	김춘도	No	No
—	Kim Chang-gwang	김창광	No	No
—	Kim Yong-gyu	김영규	No	No
—	Jo Jun-mo	조준모	No	Alternate
—	Sin Yong-chol (Note: Sin Yong-chol was by-elected as an alternate member on 7 October 2017, but was later recalled. He returned as an alternate member by being by-elected on 31 December 2019.)	신영철	No	Member
—	Kim Chang-yop	김창엽	No	No
—	Jang Chun-gil	장춘실	No	Alternate
—	Pak Chol-min	박철민	No	Alternate
—	Pak Mun-ho	박문호	No	Member
—	Choe Sung-ryong	최승룡	No	Alternate
—	Choe Rak-hyon	최락현	No	Alternate
—	Ho Pong-il	허봉일	No	No
—	Kim Kwang-yong	김광영	No	Alternate
—	Son Thae-chol	손태철	No	No
—	Yu Jin	유진	No	No
—	Ri Son-gwon (Note: Ri Son-gwon was by-elected as an alternate member on 20 April 2018, and as a member on 11 April 2020.)	리선권	No	Member
—	Hong Jong-duk (Note: By-elected as an alternate member on 20 April 2018.)	홍정득	No	No
—	Sok Sang-won	석상원	No	No
—	Jang Kil-ryong (Note: Jang Kil-ryong was by-elected as an alternate member on 20 April 2018, and as a member on 10 April 2019.)	장길룡	No	No
—	Pak Hun (Note: Pak Hun was by-elected as an alternate member on 20 April 2018, and as a member on 10 April 2019.)	박훈	No	Member
—	Ko Ki-Chol	고기철	No	No
—	An Myong-gon	안명건	No	No
—	Ko Myong-chol	고명철	No	Alternate
—	Kim Son-uk	김선욱	No	Alternate
—	Hong Man-ho	홍만호	No	Alternate
—	Kim Chol-ha	김철하	No	Member
—	Kim Yong-gu	김용구	No	Alternate
—	Kim Chol-ryong	김철룡	No	No
—	Kim Il-guk	김일국	No	Alternate
—	Kim Myong-chol (Note: By-elected as an alternate member on 10 April 2019.)	김명철	No	No
—	Kim Yong-su	김용수	No	Member
—	Ri Tam	리담	No	Alternate
—	Ri Kang-son	리강선	No	No
—	Yun Kang-ho	윤강호	No	No
—	Kang Chol-gu	강철구	No	Alternate
—	Kim Chol-su	김철수	No	Alternate
—	Ri Chol-jin	리철진	No	No
—	Kim Kwang-uk	김광욱	No	Alternate
—	Choe Pyong-wan	최병완	No	Member
—	Kwak Chang-sik (Note: Kwak Chang-sik was by-elected as an alternate member on 10 April 2019, and as a member on 31 December 2019.)	곽창식	No	Member
—	Kim Chol	김철	No	No
—	Ri Kil-chun	리길춘	No	No
—	Kim Pong-yong	김봉영	No	No
—	Ri Song-guk	리성국	No	Alternate
—	Pak Myong-son	박명선	No	Alternate
—	Pak Jong-ho	박종호	No	Alternate
—	Kim Jin-yong	김진용	No	Alternate
—	Pak Kwang-ju (Note: Pak Kwang-ju was by-elected as an alternate member on 10 April 2019, and as a member on 31 December 2019.)	박광주	No	Member
—	Pak Myong-su (Note: Pak Myong-su was by-elected as an alternate member on 10 April 2019, and as a member on 31 December 2019.)	박명수	No	Member
—	Ri Kyong-il	리경일	No	Alternate
—	Choe Kyong-chol	최경철	No	Alternate
—	O Chun-bok	오춘복	No	No
—	Jang Kwang-myong (Note: By-elected as an alternate member on 31 December 2019.)	장광명	No	Member
—	Jon Hyon-chol	전현철	No	Member
—	Sim Hong-bin	심홍빈	No	Member
—	Ri Thae-il (Note: Ri Thae-il was by-elected as an alternate member on 31 December 2019, and as a member on 11 April 2020.)	리태일	No	Member
—	Choe Kwang-il	최광일	No	Member
—	Ri Wan-sik	리완식	No	No
—	Ri Yong-chol	리영철	No	No
—	Choe Chun-gil	최춘길	No	Member
—	Kim Hak-chol	김학철	No	Alternate
—	Kim Chol (Note: Kim Chol was by-elected as an alternate member on 31 December 2019, and as a member on 11 April 2020.)	김철	No	No
—	Pak Jong-gun	박정근	No	Member
—	Jon Hak-chol (Note: Jon Hak-chol was by-elected as an alternate member on 31 December 2019, and as a member on 11 April 2020.)	전학철	No	Member
—	Jo Yong-dok	조용덕	No	Alternate
—	Kim Sung-jin	김승진	No	Member
—	Mun Jong-ung	문정웅	No	Alternate
—	Ri Jong-gil	리정길	No	Alternate
—	Choe Song-nam	최성남	No	Alternate
—	Jon Hyong-gil	전형길	No	No
—	Kang Son	강선	No	Alternate
—	Kim Yong-bae	김영배	No	No
—	Kim Ki-ryong	김기룡	No	Alternate
—	Sin Hong-chol	신홍철	No	Alternate
—	Kim Yong-nam	김영남	No	Alternate
—	Kim Jong-nam (Note: Kim Jong-nam was by-elected as an alternate member on 11 April 2020, and as a member on 7 June 2020.)	김정남	No	Member
—	Ri Song-hak (Note: By-elected as an alternate member on 11 April 2020.)	리성학	No	Member
—	Jon Myong-sik	전명식	No	No
—	Sin Chang-il	신창일	No	Alternate
—	Jang Yong-rok	장영록	No	Member
—	Kim Sun-chol	김순철	No	Member
—	Rim Yong-chol (Note: By-elected as an alternate member on 7 June 2020.)	림영철	No	Member
—	Kang Il-sop	강일섭	No	No
—	Sin In-yong	신인영	No	No
—	Ri Kyong-chon	리경천	No	Alternate
—	Kim Ju-sam	김주삼	No	Alternate
—	Kim Jong-chol	김정철	No	Alternate
—	Choe Kwang-jun	최광준	No	No
—	Yang Myong-chol	양명철	No	Alternate
—	Kim Yong-chol	김영철	No	Alternate
—	Pak Man-ho	박만호	No	Alternate

== Department directors ==
The following were appointed as department directors of the 7th Central Committee.

The names of department directors are listed according to the order of their appointment at the 1st Plenary Meeting of the 7th Central Committee. Department directors who have an en dash (—) in the Rank column were appointed during the term of the 7th Central Committee.

Rank	Name	Korean	6th (Note: Status as department director at the end of the 6th Central Committee's term.)	8th (Note: Status as department director at the start of the 8th Central Committee's term.)
1	Kim Ki-nam	김기남	Yes	No
2	Ri Su-yong	리수용	No	No
3	Kim Phyong-hae	김평해	Yes	No
4	O Su-yong	오수용	No	No
5	Kim Yong-chol	김영철	No	No
6	Ri Man-gon (Note: Ri Man-gon was re-appointed as a department director on 10 April 2019.)	리만건	No	No
7	Ri Il-hwan (Note: Ri Il-hwan was re-appointed as a department director on 31 December 2019.)	리일환	No	Yes
8	An Jong-su	안정수	No	No
9	Ri Chol-man	리철만	No	Yes
10	Choe Sang-gon	최상건	No	Yes
11	Ri Yong-rae	리영래	No	No
12	Kim Jong-im	김정임	Yes	No
13	Kim Jung-hyop	김중협	No	No
14	Kim Man-song	김만성	No	No
15	Kim Yong-su (Note: Kim Yong-su was re-appointed as a department director on 7 October 2017, and on 13 August 2020.)	김용수	No	Yes
—	Choe Ryong-hae (Note: Choe Ryong-hae was appointed as a department director on 7 October 2017.)	최룡해	No	No
—	Pak Kwang-ho (Note: Pak Kwang-ho was appointed as a department director on 7 October 2017.)	박광호	No	No
—	Thae Jong-su (Note: Thae Jong-su was appointed as a department director on 7 October 2017.)	태종수	Yes	No
—	Ryang Won-ho (Note: Ryang Won-ho was appointed as a department director on 7 October 2017.)	량원호	No	No
—	Ju Yong-sik (Note: Ju Yong-sik was appointed as a department director on 7 October 2017.)	주영식	No	No
—	Sin Ryong-man (Note: Sin Ryong-man was appointed as a department director on 7 October 2017.)	신룡만	No	No
—	Jang Kum-chol (Note: Jang Kum-chol was appointed as a department director on 10 April 2019.)	장금철	No	No
—	Kim Tong-il (Note: Kim Tong-il was appointed as a department director on 10 April 2019.)	김동일	No	No
—	Kim Hyong-jun (Note: Kim Hyong-jun was appointed as a department director on 31 December 2019.)	김형준	No	No
—	Choe Hwi (Note: Choe Hwi was appointed as a department director on 31 December 2019.)	최휘	No	Yes
—	Ri Pyong-chol (Note: Ri Pyong-chol was appointed as a department director on 31 December 2019.)	리병철	No	No
—	Kim Tok-hun (Note: Kim Tok-hun was appointed as a department director on 31 December 2019.)	김덕훈	No	No
—	Choe Pu-il (Note: Choe Pu-il was appointed as a department director on 31 December 2019.)	최부일	No	No
—	Ho Chol-man (Note: Ho Chol-man was appointed as a department director on 31 December 2019.)	허철만	No	Yes
—	Ri Ho-rim (Note: Ri Ho-rim was appointed as a department director on 31 December 2019.)	리호림	No	No
—	Han Kwang-sang (Note: Han Kwang-sang was appointed as a department director on 31 December 2019.)	한광상	No	No
—	O Il-jong (Note: O Il-jong was appointed as a department director on 31 December 2019.)	오일정	Yes	Yes
—	Kim Jae-ryong (Note: Kim Jae-ryong was appointed as a department director on 13 August 2020.)	김재룡	No	Yes
—	Pak Thae-dok (Note: Pak Thae-dok was appointed as a department director on 13 August 2020.)	박태덕	No	Yes
—	Pak Myong-sun (Note: Pak Myong-sun was appointed as a department director on 13 August 2020.)	박명순	No	Yes
—	Jon Kwang-ho (Note: Jon Kwang-ho was appointed as a department director on 13 August 2020.)	전광호	No	No

== Control Commission ==
=== Leadership ===
- Chairman:
  - Hong In-bom, until 7 October 2017
  - Jo Yon-jun, 7 October 2017 – 31 December 2019
  - Ri Sang-won, from 31 December 2019
- First Vice Chairman: Jong Myong-hak
- Vice Chairman: Ri Tuk-nam

=== Members ===
The following were elected as members of the 7th Control Commission.

The names of members are listed according to the order of their election at the 1st Plenary Meeting of the 7th Central Committee. Department directors who have an en dash (—) in the Rank column were by-elected during the term of the 7th Central Committee.

Rank	Name	Korean	6th COC (Note: Status in the Control Commission as of the 3rd Conference.)	8th CAC (Note: Status in the 8th Central Auditing Commission at the start of its term.)
1	Hong In-bom	홍인범	No	No
2	Jong Myong-hak	정명학	Yes	No
3	Ri Tuk-nam	리득남	Yes	No
4	Kim Yong-hwan (Note: Kim Yong-hwan was appointed as party chief secretary of Ryanggang Province on 31 December 2019.)	김영환	No	No
5	Kim Kum-chol	김금철	No	No
6	Kim Yong-son	김용선	Yes	No
7	Kim Myong-chol	김명철	No	No
—	Jo Yon-jun (Note: Jo Yon-jun was by-elected as a member on 7 October 2017.)	조연준	No	No
—	Ri Sang-won (Note: Ri Sang-won was by-elected as a member on 31 December 2019.)	리상원	No	No
—	Ri Kyong-chol (Note: Ri Kyong-chol was by-elected as a member on 11 April 2020.)	리경철	No	Yes
—	Won Hyong-gil (Note: Won Hyong-gil was by-elected as a member on 11 April 2020.)	원형길	No	No

== See also ==
- Central Committee of the Workers' Party of Korea
