= 2014 North Korean parliamentary election =

- 9 March 2014

All 687 seats in the Supreme People's Assembly 344 seats needed for a majority
- Turnout: 99.97% ▼0.01 pp
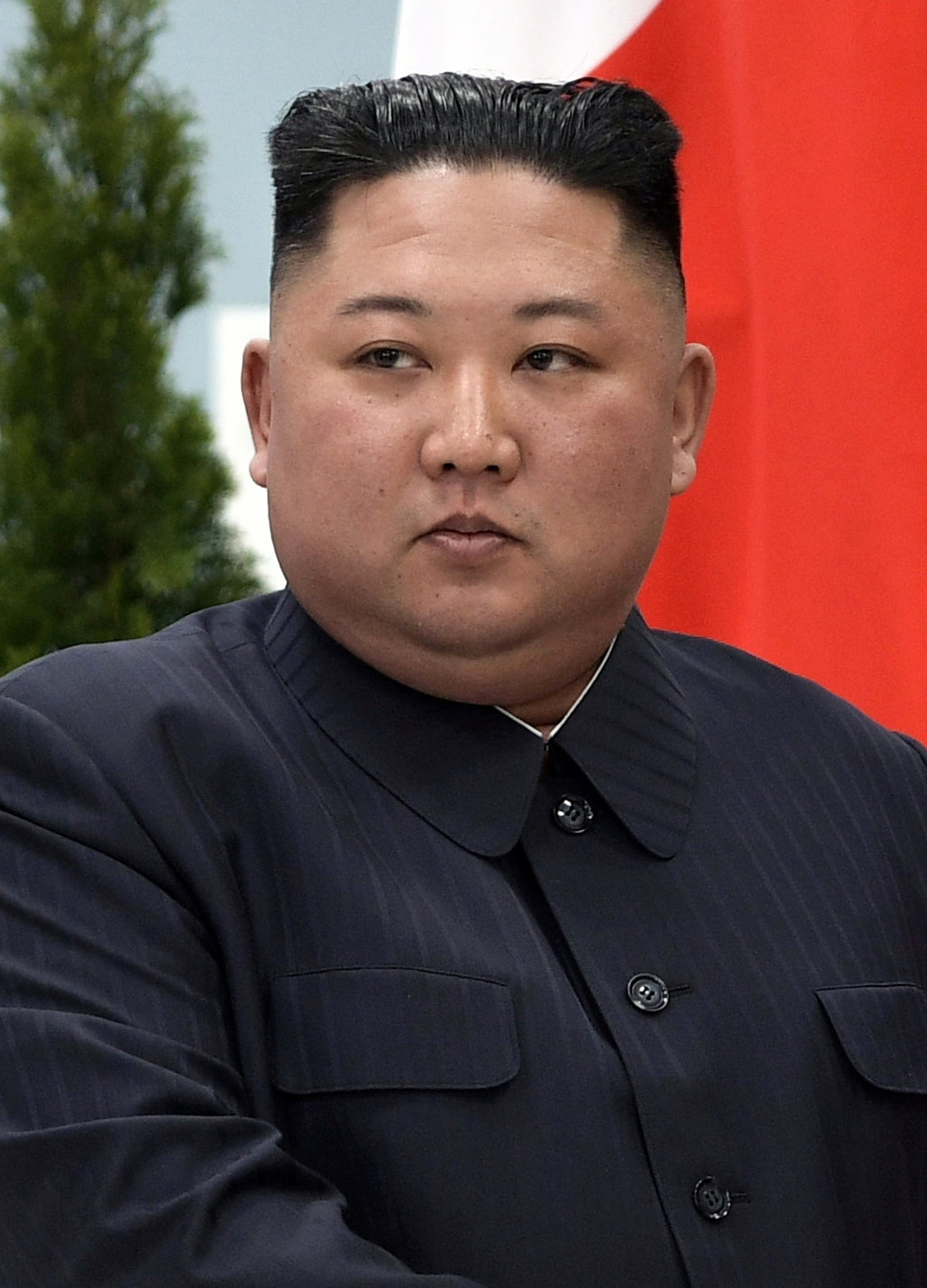
	First party
Leader	Kim Jong Un
Party	Workers' Party
Alliance	Fatherland Front
Leader since	11 April 2012
Leader's seat	Paektusan 111
Last election	687
Seats won	687
Seat change	Steady
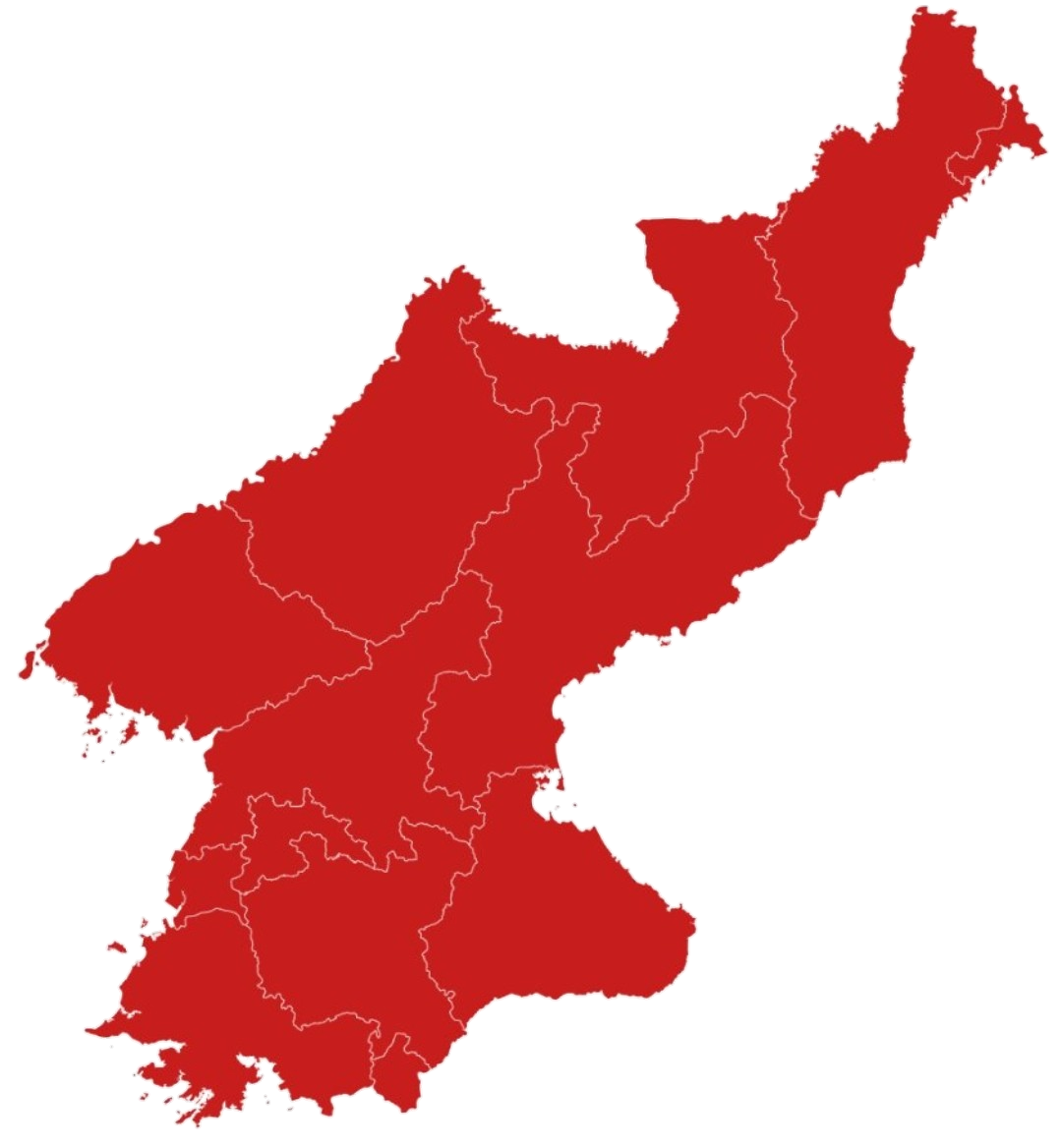
- Results by province
SAC Chairman before election
Kim Jong Un
Workers' Party
Elected SAC Chairman
Kim Jong Un
Workers' Party

Parliamentary elections were held in North Korea on 9 March 2014 to elect the members of the 13th Supreme People's Assembly.

== Background ==
These were the first elections since Kim Jong Un became leader of the country as the leader of the Workers' Party of Korea, following the death of his father Kim Jong Il and the execution of Jang Song-thaek.

Outside observers claimed the elections were an effective way to poll the population on their opinion on the government. In addition, it functioned as a way for the government to determine whether any of its citizens had illegally changed their voting district within the country, or if people had left the country. The North Korean Government did so by enforcing borders and surveillance, in order to make sure that the voter turnout is reflective of the population. If there were missing people, then the local workers and residents would be found responsible, so local workers tried to ensure order in their region.

On 4 February KCNA reported that a meeting of electorates in Paektusan Constituency 111 nominated WPK first secretary Kim Jong Un as deputy to the Supreme People's Assembly. According to a report in the Rodong Sinmun, the meeting to select him took place in the presence of senior military figures, such as KPA General Political Department Director Choe Ryong-hae, Chief of the General Staff of the Korean People's Army Ri Yong-gil, and Minister of the People's Armed Forces Jang Jong-nam.

== Voting practices and procedures ==
The purpose of elections in North Korea that year was to determine the location of voters and, in theory, their political allegiance, as well as to fill parliament seats with new members who are loyal to Kim Jong Un. Members of the Supreme People's Assembly were elected in single-member constituencies, with one approved candidate put forward in each constituency. Large groups of voters were presented with a ballot while moving through a voting booth, on which there was a single box to tick a candidate's name. Voters had to stop to cross out the candidate, making the process a monitored event. Voting is also compulsory in North Korea. Some North Koreans in China who defected to South Korea after the famine in their home country in the mid-1990s had said that they did so because they feared punishment back home for failing to show up for parliamentary elections.

== Results ==
The main parties taking part were the Workers' Party of Korea, the Korean Social Democratic Party, the Chondoist Chongu Party as well as independent candidates. All candidates were also members of the Democratic Front for the Reunification of the Fatherland. While there are officially four parties in North Korean politics, each candidate must be approved by the Democratic Front for the Reunification of the Fatherland, the dominant party in North Korean politics.

Party or alliance		Votes	%	Seats
Fatherland Front	Workers' Party of Korea		100	607
Fatherland Front	Korean Social Democratic Party		100	50
Fatherland Front	Chondoist Chongu Party		100	22
Fatherland Front	Chongryon		100	5
Fatherland Front	Religious associations		100	3
Total				687
Registered voters/turnout			99.97	
Source: IPU

=== Elected members ===
The following were elected as members of parliament:

No.	Constituency	Elected deputy
1	Mangyongdae	Pak Jong-nam
2	Kwangbok	Choe Phyong-il
3	Phalgol	Yun Yong-chol
4	Janghun	Kim Yun-sil
5	Kallimgil	O Ryong-thaek
6	Chukjon	Ri Ul-sol
7	Taephyong	Kim Yong-bok
8	Wollo	Kim Tong-suk
9	Kyongsang	Kim Kwang-chol
10	Kyogu	Hong So-hon
11	Ryonhwa	Sim Kyong-ok
12	Sochang	Kil Kum-sun
13	Phyongchon	Ri Yon-hui
14	Ansan	Ri Yong-sik
15	Ponghak	Pak Hyang-sim
16	Ryukgyo	Mun Sok-bul
17	Saemaul	Jo Kil-nyo
18	Pothonggang	Pang Sung-son
19	Ryugyong	Kim Ung-chol
20	Pulgungori	Ri Mi-ok
21	Kaeson	Yang Hyong-sop
22	Pipha	Jo Yon-jun
23	Jonsung	O Kuk-ryol
24	Kinmaul	Pyon Yong-sam
25	Sosong	Kim Hae-song
26	Janggyong	Kim Tong-hyok
27	Hasin	Kim Kyong-su
28	Jungsin	Pak Pong-nam
29	Taesong	Thae Hyong-chol
30	Ryonghung	Kim Yong-ju
31	Anhak	Jong Myong-il
32	Tongmun	Kim Song-hui
33	Chongryu	Kim Myong-sik
34	Munsu	Ri Myong-chol
35	Tapje	Ri Yong-mu
36	Sagok	Ryang Pong-jin
37	Tongdaewon	Choe Yong-rim
38	Ryuldong	Kim Sok-nam
39	Silli	Kim In-chol
40	Samma	Yun Sok-chon
41	Songyo	Ri Kyong-il
42	Tungme	Kim Yong-il
43	Ryulgok	Hwang Kil-chol
44	Yongje	Mun Kang-sun
45	Rangnang	Choe Song-il
46	Jongo	Jang Jae-on
47	Jongbaek	Choe Myong-hak
48	Chungsong	Ri Kun-il
49	Kwanmun	Kim Kyok-sik
50	Sungri	Kim Yang-gon
51	Wonam	Pak Hyong-ryol
52	Ryongsong	Ri Song-hui
53	Rimwon	Cha Hui-rim
54	Ryonggung	Ju Kyu-chang
55	Unha	Kim Yong-nam
56	Oun	Choe Chun-sik
57	Masan	Choe Song-won
58	Kwahak	Jang Chol
59	Paesan	Pak Thae-song
60	Sadong	Jo Hyong-chol
61	Turu	Pak Yong-ae
62	Hyuam	Choe Thae-bok
63	Rihyon	Jong Yong-suk
64	Ryokpho	Hong Son-ok
65	Nunggum	Ri Chang-sik
66	Hyongjesan	Choe Chol-jung
67	Hadang	Ro Ik-hwa
68	Hyongsan	Kim Jong-suk
69	Sinmi	Kim Pong-chol
70	Sunan	Kang Ki-sop
71	Sokbak	Jong Myong-chol
72	Samsok	Kim Phyong-hae
73	Todok	Kim Yong-chun
74	Kangnam	Han Ho-nam
75	Yongjin	Ri Hyon-chol
76	Kangdong	Jo Chun-ryong
77	Ponghwa	Kim Yong-dae
78	Samdung	Kim Yong-ho
79	Hari	Jong Myong-su
80	Hukryong	Kim Phyo-hun
81	Munhwa	Ri Man-song
82	Phyongsong	Chae Myong-hak
83	Undok	An Myong-ok
84	Ori	Kang Sok-ju
85	Samhwa	Ro Tu-chol
86	Kuwol	Yun Yong-nam
87	Okjon	Pak Kil-nam
88	Paeksong	Kim Jong-im
89	Anju	Chae Ho-nam
90	Sinanju	Pak Sun-nyo
91	Tongmyon	Han Kwang-sang
92	Wonphung	Kang Yong-su
93	Nampyong	Kim Myong-chol
94	Namhung	Ri Mu-yong
95	Kaechon	Kim Kum-suk
96	Ramjon	Mun Myong-hak
97	Sambong	Ri Yong-chol
98	Konji	Paek Song-nam
99	Kangchol	Jang Pyong-gyu
100	Ryungjin	Kim Sun-hwa
101	Kakam	Han Song-ho
102	Alil	Rim Tong-chol
103	Ryongun	Ri Yong-su
104	Sunchon	O Yong-gon
105	Thaebaeksan	Kim Kwang-hyok
106	Otaesan	Ri Pyong-chol
107	Unphasan	Cha Jun-sik
108	Chilbongsan	Sim Jae-ul
109	Myolaksan	Choe Yong-ho
110	Jangamsan	Ho Ryong
111	Paektusan	Kim Jong Un
112	Pongsusan	Ri Song-sun
113	Sobaeksan	Kim Jong-gwan
114	Namchongang	Hwang Kun-il
115	Jangjagang	Kim Myong-sik
116	Sinphagang	Jin Chol-su
117	Taesongsan	Pyon In-son
118	Mannyonsan	Jon Il
119	Kuwolsan	Kim Jin-chol
120	Hallasan	No Kwang-chol
121	Chonmasan	Jon Yong-hak
122	Samgaksan	Ri Kyong-chon
123	Sungrisan	Jo Kyong-chol
124	Osongsan	Ri Yong-rae
125	Roktusan	So Hong-chan
126	Unbaeksan	Choe Tong-yun
127	Pongsungsan	Kim Kwang-chol
128	Paekmasan	Ri Jong-guk
129	Songaksan	Kim Kum-chol
130	Suyangsan	An Kuk-chol
131	Sindoksan	Choe Song-un
132	Myongdangsan	Han Chang-sun
133	Pongaksan	Pak Yong-bok
134	Taemyongsan	Kim Myong-nam
135	Ryongaksan	Kim Sok-hong
136	Songchongang	An Ji-yong
137	Phyongchongang	Pak Su-il
138	Sujonggang	Jin Yong-chol
139	Chailgang	Kim Song-il
140	Samchongang	Pak Jong-chon
141	Somjingang	Song Sok-won
142	Yongchongang	Kim Chun-sam
143	Okchongang	Choe Ryong-hae
144	Ryesangang	Pak Sung-won
145	Wigumgang	Kim Su-gil
146	Kalmagang	Chon Jae-gwon
147	Haegumgang	Kim Chol
148	Piphagang	Kim Kwang-hyon
149	Kumchongang	Ri Yong-gil
150	Taedonggang	Jang Jong-nam
151	Chongchongang	Ri Chol
152	Amnokgang	Pang Chang-dok
153	Tumangang	Pak Tong-hak
154	Kunmasan	An Ki-chol
155	Naegumgang	Ri Kwan-su
156	Kumsu	Yun Jong-rin
157	Haebal	Kim Song-dok
158	Moranbong	Ri Kuk-jun
159	Haebang	Kim Won-hong
160	Pyoldong	Choe Pu-il
161	Hyoksin	Kang Phil-hun
162	Hwaebul	Kim Myong-ju
163	Jonjin	Hwang Min-chol
164	Jasonggang	Ri Yong-hwan
165	Ponghwasan	Sin Sung-hun
166	Kumgangsan	Ro Kyong-jun
167	Saedok	Kim Song-ui
168	Soksu	Choe Yong-il
169	Ryonpho	Choe Yong-gon
170	Jeyak	Pak Pong-ju
171	Subok	Choe Hwi
172	Jikdong	Song Chang-ho
173	Ryongak	Choe Ji-son
174	Tokchon	Kim Chol-ung
175	Kongwon	Ro Hung-se
176	Jenam	Ri Yong-chol
177	Chongsong	Hong In-bom
178	Sangdok	Choe Kwang-jin
179	Jangsang	Hyon Ung-sil
180	Taedong	Hong Kwang-suk
181	Sijong	Kim Chang-sop
182	Yongok	Kim Hye-ran
183	Jungsan	Ri Ryong-nam
184	Kwangje	Sin O-sun
185	Phungjong	Han Chol
186	Phyongwon	Kim Jung-hyop
187	Wonhwa	So Kyong-sim
188	Opha	Ma Won-chun
189	Unbong	Son Kyong-nam
190	Hanchon	Sim Kuk-ryong
191	Sukchon	Kim Kye-gwan
192	Ryongdok	Kim Man-song
193	Yoldusamchon	Kim Yong-gil
194	Namyang	Yu Jong-sok
195	Komsan	Jang Hyon-chol
196	Mundok	Pak Myong-chol
197	Ripsok	Rim Tok-hwa
198	Ryongo	Ju Myong-son
199	Songchon	Tong Jong-ho
200	Kunja	Ju Su-yong
201	Sinsongchon	Ho Jong-chon
202	Jangrim	Kim Ki-gun
203	Sinyang	An Kum-chol
204	Yangdok	Kang Chu-ryon
205	Tongyang	Kim Ok-ryon
206	Unsan	Kil Rye-su
207	Chonsong	Kang Hyong-bong
208	Kubong	Hyon Sang-ju
209	Jaedong	Kim Kyong-ho
210	Haksan	Sin Ung-sik
211	Mangil	Kim Kwang-uk
212	Pukchang	Kim Yong-chol
213	Songnam	Mun Sun-hui
214	Okchon	Kim Yon-hwa
215	Inpho	U Won-yong
216	Maengsan	Jo Won-thaek
217	Nyongwon	Pak Tong-chol
218	Taehung	Kim Sang-uk
219	Hoechang	Son Sok-gun
220	Sinjak	Kim Pae-jong
221	Chongnam	Pak Yong-jin
222	Komunkum	An Chol-sik
223	Tukjang	Jon Hak-chol
224	Ungok	Kim Tong-il
225	Sinuiju	So Ran-hui
226	Paeksa	Ri Hak-song
227	Namjung	Kim Kyong-nam
228	Minpho	Ri Kwang-gun
229	Sumun	Jon Il-chun
230	Chinson	O Jong-hui
231	Ryusang	Jong Myong-hak
232	Wai	Ri Pong-juk
233	Sokha	Kim Hye-yong
234	Rakchong	Pak Jong-gun
235	Yonha	Yun Tu-gun
236	Kusong	So Chun-yong
237	Paeksok	Pak Chun-gon
238	Panghyon	Yun Tong-hyon
239	Namchang	O Mun-hyon
240	Chahung	O Mun-hyon
241	Jongju	Kim Ik-chol
242	Tokon	Kim Hui-suk
243	Koan	Kim Kyong-ae
244	Namho	Ri Yong-jun
245	Kalsan	Kwon Song-ho
246	Sakju	Pak Song-sil
247	Phungnyon	Ri Man-gon
248	Suphung	Kang Won-sik
249	Chongsong	Kim Pong-il
250	Phihyon	Kim Jong-sun
251	Ryangchaek	Han Song-hyok
252	Paekma	Kim Yong-son
253	Ryongchon	Ri Myong-chol
254	Pukjung	Kim Yong-man
255	Ryongampho	Kwak Chol-ho
256	Sinam	Kim Yong-sun
257	Yomju	Ju Yong-sik
258	Tasa	Choe Yong-dok
259	Woeha	Paek On
260	Cholsan	So Tong-myong
261	Kasan	Ri Chol
262	Tongrim	Hong Kyong-jun
263	Chonggang	Choe Sang-gon
264	Singok	Ri Yong-chol
265	Sonchon	Jong Yong-won
266	Wolchon	Choe Kang
267	Samsong	Jon Yong-son
268	Inam	Ho Kwang-chun
269	Kwaksan	Kye Myong-chol
270	Wonha	Cha Sung-su
271	Chojang	Kim Jae-song
272	Unjon	Kim In-sun
273	Taeo	Jon Kyong-son
274	Posok	Choe Kwang-chol
275	Pakchon	Kim Hak-chol
276	Toksam	Ryu Jong-guk
277	Maengjung	Jon Kyong-nam
278	Nyongbyon	Kim Kum-sil
279	Phalwon	Kim Jong-bin
280	Kujang	Kim Hi-thaek
281	Ryongdung	Kim Yong-song
282	Ryongmun	Ri Kyong-jin
283	Sugu	Jong Ri-jong
284	Hyangsan	Jon Hyong-jong
285	Thaephyong	Kim Kyong-hui
286	Unsan	Kim Yong-chun
287	Phungyang	Ri Chol-jin
288	Joyang	Kim Chang-ryong
289	Thaechon	O Hye-son
290	Unhung	Ho Jong-ok
291	Hakbong	Kim Man-su
292	Chonma	Choe Jong-gon
293	Joak	Kim Kun-chol
294	Uiju	Jang Pyong-thae
295	Unchon	Ryang Su-jong
296	Tokryong	Mo Sung-gil
297	Taegwan	Jo Yong-su
298	Taeryong	Cha Myong-ok
299	Changsong	Kim Yun-sok
300	Tongchang	Han Chol-min
301	Pyokdong	Jo Song-yun
302	Sindo	Ri Yong-chol
303	Yaksan	Choe Song-il
304	Haechong	So Sung-chol
305	Uppha	Kim Hyon-suk
306	Okgye	Choe Jong-ryong
307	Soae	Kang Ji-yong
308	Sokchon	Sim Il-chol
309	Hakhyon	U Chang-sik
310	Pyoksong	Pak Un-ok
311	Jukchon	Ri Yong-chol
312	Kangryong	Jang Yong-su
313	Pupho	Yo Man-hyon
314	Kumdong	Choe Sun-chol
315	Ongjin	Sim Chol-ho
316	Raengjong	Paek Kyong-sin
317	Samsan	Kim Mok-ryong
318	Jonsan	Kim Jong-man
319	Thaetan	Ju Jong-gyong
320	Kwasan	Ri Jong-guk
321	Jangyon	Kim Il-jin
322	Rakyon	Kang Thae-bong
323	Samchon	Kim Ik-jung
324	Talchon	Kim Jong
325	Songhwa	Cha Yong-myong
326	Unryul	Ri Song-ok
327	Kumsanpho	Kang Kil-yong
328	Jangryon	Kim Sung-du
329	Unchon	Kim Tok-song
330	Ryangdam	Hong Kum-son
331	Anak	Ji Sang-man
332	Wolji	Choe Yong-sam
333	Taechu	Hwang Yun-nam
334	Omgot	Ri Chol-man
335	Sinchon	Mun Ung-jo
336	Saenal	Chae Yong-il
337	Saegil	Pak Yong-ho
338	Panjong	Ri Jong-bong
339	Jaeryong	An Sung-ok
340	Samjigang	Ri Hye-suk
341	Jangguk	Ri Myong-gil
342	Pukji	Kim Tae-song
343	Sinwon	Kim Ok-gyu
344	Muhak	Ri Su-yong
345	Pongchon	Kang Yong-jun
346	Sindap	Kang Jong-hui
347	Paechon	Won Kyong-mo
348	Kumsong	Jin Sang-chol
349	Jongchon	Kim Jin-guk
350	Unbong	Kye Yong-sam
351	Kumgok	Kang Myong-chol
352	Yonan	Kang Phyo-yong
353	Ohyon	Jin Yon-sil
354	Songho	Ri Thae-sik
355	Chonthae	Kong Yon-ok
356	Haewol	Kim Hyong-ryong
357	Chongdan	Ri Chang-ryong
358	Namchon	Kwon Thae-mun
359	Tokdal	Ri Hong-sop
360	Hwayang	Ri Sung-ho
361	Ryongyon	Choe Un
362	Kumi	Hwang Kang-chol
363	Kwail	Jo Jong-sop
364	Sindae	Song Hyo-nam
365	Sariwon	O Myong-chun
366	Wonju	O Il-jong
367	Migok	Song Yun-hui
368	Songyong	Kang Ha-guk
369	Kwangsong	Kang Ryon-hak
370	Jongbang	Hwang Pyong-so
371	Unha	Chae Kang-hwan
372	Kuchon	Jang Myong-sil
373	Songrim	Yun Je-won
374	Sokthap	Kim Chung-gol
375	Tangsan	Kwak Pom-gi
376	Kaesong	Paek Chun-gi
377	Tonghyon	Won Tong-yon
378	Sonjuk	Ri Jong-hyok
379	Unhak	Pang Kang-su
380	Tokam	Jon Yong-nam
381	Phyongwa	Kim Song-hui
382	Ryongsan	Ri Kil-song
383	Kaephung	Kim Jong-gak
384	Hwangju	Jon Sung-nam
385	Chongryong	Ri Chol-ho
386	Samjong	Kim Chol-guk
387	Hukgyo	Kim Yong-gon
388	Yonthan	Ri Hun-yong
389	Misan	Ri Yong-sik
390	Pongsan	Pak Thae-dok
391	Madong	Kim Song-chol
392	Chonggye	Kim Chang-gwang
393	Kuyon	Kim Ok-son
394	Unpha	Pae Hak
395	Kangan	Choe Chang-son
396	Kwangmyong	Rim Sok-bok
397	Rinsan	Choe Jin-su
398	Taechon	Kim Jong-ok
399	Sohung	Ri Thae-sop
400	Poman	Ri Jae-uk
401	Suan	Choe Sin-uk
402	Namjong	Pak Yong-chol
403	Yonsan	Kim Tu-chol
404	Holdong	Ri Jong-mu
405	Sinphyong	Ri Chol-gyu
406	Mannyon	Ri Yong-jin
407	Koksan	Jo Jun-hak
408	Phyongam	Ryu Myong-gum
409	Singye	Nam Yong-suk
410	Jongbong	Jo Song-hwan
411	Chuchon	Pak Ui-chun
412	Phyongsan	Choe Kyong-nam
413	Chongsu	Ho Yong-chun
414	Kumchon	Kim Wan-su
415	Hyonnae	Pak Hye-suk
416	Thosan	Kim Jong-ok
417	Yangsa	Jang Ki-ho
418	Jangphung	Jo Yong-chol
419	Kuhwa	Pak Sun-gil
420	Sangwon	Kim Yong-ho
421	Myongdang	Yun Jae-hyok
422	Junghwa	Han Ung-su
423	Chaesong	Kim Ki-nam
424	Sungho	Im Hun
425	Mandal	Ri Hwa-sil
426	Wonmyong	Kim Ui-bong
427	Kanggye	Choe Chang-son
428	Yonju	An Yong-nam
429	Puchang	Jon Kil-su
430	Yahak	Ri Kwang
431	Sokhyon	Han Yong-ho
432	Woeryong	Kim Hye-ran
433	Naeryong	Kim Kwang-ju
434	Manpho	Kim Chun-sop
435	Kuo	Hong Sung-mu
436	Munak	Pyon Kyong-hwan
437	Huichon	Jo Jae-yong
438	Solmoru	So Kyong-ho
439	Chuphyong	Ra Kyong-ryong
440	Chongnyon	Jon Yong-ung
441	Jonphyong	Ri Yong
442	Songgan	Pak To-chun
443	Songryong	Sin Kwan-jin
444	Jonchon	Jong Chun-sil
445	Hakmu	Jong Sung-gi
446	Koin	Kim Kum-chol
447	Ryongrim	Kim Ryong-sil
448	Tongsin	Pak Yong-su
449	Songwon	Ri Yong-ju
450	Janggang	Kim Chang-myong
451	Hyangha	Kim Chae-ran
452	Rangrim	Ri Jong-suk
453	Hwaphyong	Kim Kwang-chol
454	Jasong	Jang Song-guk
455	Junggang	Ryom In-yun
456	Sijung	Pang Kwan-bok
457	Wiwon	O Kum-chol
458	Ryanggang	Pyon Won-chol
459	Chosan	Pak Kum-hui
460	Kophung	Pak Kyong-il
461	Usi	Kim Tok-hun
462	Segil	An Yong-guk
463	Kwanphung	Pyon Ung-gyu
464	Jangdok	Yun Sang-bom
465	Pongchun	Pak Jong-nam
466	Myongsok	Ho Jong-man
467	Wonnam	Rim Sun-hui
468	Phoha	Han Won-il
469	Pokmak	Kim Kwang-il
470	Kalma	Kim Yun-hyok
471	Munchon	Ri Hak-chol
472	Munphyong	Ji Jong-gwan
473	Okphyong	Kim Jong-sim
474	Chonnae	Kwon Kum-ryong
475	Hwara	Kim Jin-gyu
476	Anbyon	Han Pyong-man
477	Paehwa	Kim Yong-sik
478	Kosan	Ho Song-il
479	Puphyong	Jong Hae
480	Solbong	Son Kum-wol
481	Thongchon	O Kang-chol
482	Songjon	Yun Yong-il
483	Kosong	Kim In-bok
484	Onjong	Pak Myong-guk
485	Kumgang	Kang Su-rin
486	Soksa	Kye Hun-nyo
487	Changdo	Pak Kun-gwang
488	Kimhwa	Kim Tong-son
489	Songsan	Kim Chon-gyun
490	Hoeyang	Mun Yong-chol
491	Sepho	Hwang Min
492	Huphyong	Won To-hui
493	Phyonggang	Son Chol-ju
494	Pokgye	Ri Jong-mun
495	Cholwon	Pak Tu-phil
496	Naemun	Kim Kuk-chang
497	Ichon	Han Yong-chol
498	Phangyo	Paek Jong-sun
499	Popdong	Han Chun-sik
500	Somun	Kim Yong-jin
501	Samil	Han Chang-nam
502	Sangsinhung	Chu Yong-suk
503	Tonghungsan	Mun Yong-son
504	Sosang	Thae Jong-su
505	Phungho	Mun Sang-gwon
506	Hoesang	Yu Kyong-suk
507	Segori	Han Song-il
508	Jongsong	Kwon Son-hwa
509	Toksan	Ho Song-chol
510	Sapho	Ri Chun-hwa
511	Saegori	Jong Pyong-gon
512	Choun	Kim Sung-gi
513	Hungdok	Yu Kwang-jong
514	Hungso	Mun Kwang-il
515	Haean	Jong Chang-sok
516	Unjung	Kim Il-hun
517	Chongi	Kong Sung-il
518	Ryujong	Choe Hyon
519	Soho	Kim Chol-yong
520	Sinpho	Song Chun-sop
521	Phungo	Choe Myong-chol
522	Ohang	Ri Hyok
523	Yanghwa	Tong Yong-il
524	Tanchon	Ri Chan-hwa
525	Ssangryong	Jon Hye-song
526	Sindanchon	Ho Thae-chol
527	Omong	Kang Jong-gwan
528	Ryongdae	Pak Yong-sik
529	Kwangchon	Ri Chun-sam
530	Paekgumsan	Jang Chun-gun
531	Kumgol	Choe Chol
532	Puktu	Hwang Yong-sam
533	Sudong	Ri Chang-han
534	Ryongphyong	Kang Pyong-hu
535	Jangdong	Hwang Pong-chol
536	Kowon	Kang Thae-sok
537	Puraesan	Kim Hyon-jin
538	Yodok	Han Ryong-guk
539	Kumya	Ri Kyu-man
540	Inhung	Jang Sun-kum
541	Kajin	Jon Yong-nam
542	Kwangmyongsong	Jon Kwang-ho
543	Jungnam	Sok Won-chun
544	Jongpyong	Nam Yong-hwal
545	Sondok	Pak Chun-nam
546	Sinsang	Ri Tong-chun
547	Chowon	Ri Hye-jong
548	Toksan	Jang Ung
549	Jangjin	Kim Chol-gyu
550	Yangji	Kwon Thae-yong
551	Pujon	Choe Chol-hu
552	Sinhung	Kim Sok-sun
553	Sangwonchon	Kye Pong-chun
554	Puhung	Han Ju-song
555	Yonggwang	Ri Wan-ho
556	Sujon	Pak Jong-hyon
557	Kisang	Choe Kwi-hon
558	Hamju	An Jong-su
559	Kusang	Kim Song-bong
560	Tongbong	Ri Yong-ae
561	Sangjung	Kim Jong-sok
562	Sojung	Kim Tong-chun
563	Samho	Cha Kyong-il
564	Hongwon	Choe Pok-sun
565	Sanyang	Hong Chol-gun
566	Unpho	Ryang Chang-nam
567	Toksong	Kim Sang-ryong
568	Janghung	Jong Kyong-hwa
569	Pukchong	Kim Jin-guk
570	Sinchang	Jong Tok-yong
571	Sinbukchong	Kang Jong-ho
572	Chonghung	Ho Myong-ok
573	Riwon	Ko Son-ok
574	Rahung	Han Jang-bin
575	Chaejong	Kim Kyong-jun
576	Hochon	Sin Pyong-gang
577	Sinhong	Jong Kwang-guk
578	Sangnong	Choe Il-ho
579	Kumho	Ri Je-son
580	Ranam	O Se-gwan
581	Rabuk	Choe Sok-hwan
582	Namchongjin	Kim Ki-song
583	Buyun	Ri Sang-gwan
584	Songpyong	So Yong-hak
585	Sabong	Kim Kwang-nam
586	Kangdok	Tong Hun
587	Susong	Kim Hyong-chan
588	Sunam	Paek Kum-sil
589	Malum	Rim Mun-chol
590	Phohang	Jong Song-hyok
591	Subuk	O Kyong-sok
592	Namhyang	Kim Yong-jae
593	Sinjin	Kang Chol-gu
594	Kyodong	O Su-yong
595	Chongam	Kim Chol-ho
596	Ryonjin	Song Ryong-su
597	Kwanhae	Sin Chol-ung
598	Hoeryong	Jong Son-hui
599	Osandok	Ri Sun-sil
600	Mangyang	Ri Kwi-ok
601	Yuson	Ri Ryong-guk
602	Songam	Jon Song-man
603	Chonghak	Ho Thae-ryul
604	Jegang	Ri Song-jae
605	Jangpyong	Ho Jae-ryul
606	Haksong	Kim Kum-ok
607	Kilju	Kang Yong-thae
608	Ilsin	Kim Il
609	Junam	Kim Song-ho
610	Yongbuk	Kim Su-il
611	Hwadae	Jo Kum-hui
612	Ryongpho	Yu Chol-u
613	Myongchon	Nam Sung-u
614	Ryongam	Kim Thaek-gu
615	Myonggan	An Tong-chun
616	Yongban	Ri Pom-gyong
617	Kukdong	Choe Yong-suk
618	Orang	Choe Yong-suk
619	Odaejin	Jon Kwang-rok
620	Kyongsong	Jong Yong-su
621	Hamyon	Hong Pong-chol
622	Sungam	Nam Hong-son
623	Puryong	Ryang Yong-ho
624	Musan	Myong Song-chol
625	Soedol	Phyo Il-sok
626	Sangchang	Kim Yong-gwang
627	Yonsa	Ro Song-ung
628	Onsong	Ri Thae-jin
629	Wangjaesan	Kim Song-jong
630	Jongsong	Kim Yong-gol
631	Kyongwon	Sok Kil-ho
632	Kogonwon	Kim Myong-son
633	Ryongbuk	Ji Jae-ryong
634	Kyonghung	Hong Man-ho
635	Haksong	O Yong-nam
636	Obong	Ja Song-nam
637	Hyesan	Pak Chol-ho
638	Hyejang	Jong Hyong-suk
639	Tapsong	Jang In-suk
640	Songbong	Ri Sang-won
641	Ryonbong	Kim Mi-nam
642	Sinpha	Kim Sung-hui
643	Phophyong	Han Myong-song
644	Koup	Yun Man-gol
645	Phungsan	Kim Yu-suk
646	Pochon	Pang Kwang-nam
647	Samjiyon	Ju Thae-gyong
648	Taehongdan	Kim Kwang-ho
649	Paekam	An Mun-hak
650	Yuphyong	Song Jong-su
651	Unhung	Ri Song-guk
652	Saeangjang	Choe Ki-jun
653	Kapsan	Yon Thae-jong
654	Oil	An Yong-gi
655	Phungso	Ri Kyong-hwa
656	Samsu	Han Myong-guk
657	Hanggu	Kang Yang-mo
658	Hupho	Han Kwang-bok
659	Munae	Ro Ik
660	Konguk	Ri Jae-il
661	Ryusa	Ha Ung-chon
662	Waudo	Ri Kil-chun
663	Namsan	Kim Tuk-sam
664	Taedae	Kang Nung-so
665	Kapmun	Tokgo Chang-guk
666	Kangso	Kim Yong-song
667	Sohak	Jong Myong-jo
668	Chongsan	Yun Chun-hwa
669	Sogi	Ri Kwang-chol
670	Tokhung	Ryu Mi-yong
671	Chollima	Jin Yong-il
672	Kangson	Kim Hyong-nam
673	Pobong	Jon Sung-hun
674	Hwasok	Kim Kyong-ok
675	Taean	Yang Sung-ho
676	Oksu	Yun Hyang-sil
677	Ryonggang	Im Jong-sil
678	Okdo	Hwang Sun-hui
679	Onchon	Kim Chol-man
680	Haeun	Jo Yong-su
681	Sohwa	Ri Song-il
682	Kwisong	Hwang Yong-bo
683	Rajin	Rim Kyong-man
684	Tongmyong	Jo Jong-ho
685	Changpyong	Sin Pong-yong
686	Sonbong	Sin Tong-su
687	Ungsang	Choe Song-nam

== First session ==
In the first session of the 14th convocation Ri Yong-mu and O Kuk-ryol retained their positions as vice-chairmen of the National Defense Commission, but Kim Yong-chun lost his vice-chairman position to Choe Ryong-hae. Minister of the People's Armed Forces Jang Jong-nam, as well as Jo Chun-ryong, were newly elected to the NDC, while Choe Pu-il, Kim Won-hong and Pak To-chun retained their membership. In the Cabinet of North Korea, the body which managed the administrative-economic apparatus, Premier of North Korea Pak Pong-ju was once again reelected to the position, which he held from 2003 to 2007, and again from 2013 to 2019. The positions in the cabinet remained primarily unchanged, and the premier, who managed the cabinet, had remained the same. Additionally, Kim Jong Un's younger sister, Kim Yo-jung, had been named in public for the first time, likely showing a rise in her own political power. She was identified as state comrade and senior official. She was shown with Kim Jong Un as he was making his way to vote at Kim Il Sung University. The most significant change in the cabinet was the replacement of Pak Ui-chun as Foreign Minister by Ri Su-yong.

Other appointments in the Cabinet:

- Mun Myong-hak replaced Ri Yong-yong as Minister of Coal Industry
- Kim Yong-gwang replaced Han Hyo-yon as Minister of Metallurgical Industry
- Ri Hak-chol replaced Kang Min-chol as Minister of Mining Industry
- Han Ryong-guk replaced Kim Kwang-yong as Minister of Forestry
- Kim Kyong-nam replaced Ri Song-ho as Minister of Commerce
- Pak Chun-nam replaced Hong Kwang-sun as Minister of Culture
- Kim Chon-gyun replaced Paek Ryong-chon as President of the Central Bank of North Korea
- Pak Myong-chol replaced Kim Pyong-ryul as President of the Supreme Court (not a cabinet position)
