= Death and state funeral of Kim Jong Il =

2011 death of North Korean leader

- Date: 17–29 December 2011
- Location: Pyongyang, North Korea
- Participants: Kim Jong Un, North Korean military, government and Korean Workers’ Party elites

Kim Jong Il, supreme leader of North Korea and general secretary of the Worker's Party of Korea, died on 17 December 2011 as reported by Korean Central Television. The channel's main news anchor, Ri Chun-hee, announced that he had died on 17 December at 8:30 am local time of a massive heart attack while traveling by train to an area outside of Pyongyang. Reportedly, he had received medical treatment for cardiac and cerebrovascular diseases, and during the trip, Kim was said to have had an "advanced acute myocardial infarction, complicated with a serious heart shock".

His third eldest son, Kim Jong Un, was announced as North Korea's next leader during the same newscast as "great successor to the revolutionary cause of Juche and outstanding leader of our party, army and people". The elder Kim's funeral was held on 28 December in Pyongyang, with a mourning period lasting until the following day.

== Announcement ==
North Korean state media did not report Kim Jong Il's death until 51 hours after it occurred, apparently due to political jockeying and discussions that surrounded the official version of his legacy, as well as agreeing upon the membership of his funeral committee. On the morning of 19 December, all work units, schools, government agencies, and military personnel were informed of a major announcement to take place at noon. At noon, Ri Chun-hee, Korean Central Television's main news anchor, clad in full black traditional Korean clothing, announced the death of Kim Jong Il to the country's general population. She was the long time announcer of many important news stories during Kim's tenure as supreme leader, and was part of the broadcast team that covered the state funeral of his father, Kim Il-Sung, in 1994. During the announcement, a portrait of a smiling, idealized image of Kim was released, continuing the tradition of issuing official posthumous portraits of supreme leaders of North Korea after their death.

Following the official notice, a male news anchor wearing a black suit and tie proceeded to announce the entire committee for Kim's funeral in order of the rankings established by the authorities. The committee had 232 names; Kim Jong Un was ranked first, while the leaders of North Korea's two minor parties, Kim Yong-dae and Ryu Mi-yong were ranked last.

=== Speculation by South Korea ===
The head of South Korea's National Intelligence Service said surveillance footage revealed that Kim's personal train, on which he is said to have died, did not move over the weekend. This implied that the train was stationary when North Korean authorities claimed he had died. According to editors of The Chosun Ilbo newspaper, it was reported circumstances surrounding Kim's death were inconsistent with what would be generally expected during official business trips: specifically inclement weather conditions were present and the time of day when Kim was supposedly travelling conflicted with his usual circadian rhythm, as Kim was known to be a night owl. Furthermore, a low number of witnesses observed the events.

== Reactions ==
Many countries, organizations, and individuals issued reactions to the death. According to CNN, reactions were "somewhat muted" in comparison to deaths of other world leaders. Just a few countries reacted immediately after Kim's death was announced on North Korea's KCTV. Some countries, like the United States, took the opportunity to comment on their relationship with South Korea. South Korea decided not to offer official condolences, mirroring both worsened relations after the ROKS Cheonan sinking and the bombardment of Yeonpyeong and its position after the death of Kim Il-sung in 1994. The Chinese Foreign Ministry called Kim a "great leader" and added that Beijing would continue to offer its support. Japan expressed condolences and said it hoped Kim's death would not affect the region adversely. Reactions in Europe were "a mix of hope and watchfulness". In North Korea, the official reaction was grief and support for the succession of Kim Jong Un, although in other places, there was a more muted reaction.

== Funeral committee ==
North Korea announced a 232-member funeral committee headed by Kim Jong Un that planned and oversaw Kim Jong Il's funeral, which took place on 28 December. Observers believe the order of names on the list gives clues to the rankings of individuals in the regime's power structure with Kim Jong Un's position on top a further indication that he is Jong Il's successor as supreme leader. According to Kim Keun-sik of Kyungnam University, "The list is in the order of members of the standing committee of the Politburo, then members and candidate members. It shows that the party will be stronger power than the military, because Kim Jong Il's brother-in-law Jang Song-taek or O Kuk-ryol, the vice-chairman of the National Defense Commission, are listed further down."

The National Funeral Committee released the following details on 19 December 2011:

[The National Funeral Committee] notifies that it decided as follows so that the whole party, army, and people can express the most profound regret at the demise of leader Kim Jong Il and mourn him in deep reverence:

His bier will be placed at the Kumsusan Memorial Palace.

Mourning period will be set from Dec. 17 to 29, Juche 100 (2011) and mourners will be received from December 20 to 27.

A farewell-bidding ceremony will be solemnly held in Pyongyang on December 28.

A national memorial service for Kim Jong Il will be held on December 29.

Mourning guns will be boomed in Pyongyang and in provincial seats timed to coincide with the national memorial service in Pyongyang and all the people will observe three minutes' silence and all locomotives and vessels will blow sirens all at once.

All institutions and enterprises across the country will hold mourning events during the mourning period and all provinces, cities and counties will hold memorial services timed to coincide with the national memorial service in Pyongyang.

The institutions and enterprises will hoist flags at half-mast and musical and all other entertainments will be refrained.

Foreign mourning delegations will not be received.

— Korean Central News Agency, 19 December 2011

=== Members ===
The 232 members of the funeral committee were:

1. Kim Jong Un
2. Kim Yong-nam
3. Choe Yong-rim
4. Ri Yong-ho
5. Kim Yong-chun
6. Jon Pyong-ho
7. Kim Kuk-thae
8. Kim Ki-nam
9. Choe Thae-bok
10. Yang Hyong-sop
11. Kang Sok-ju
12. Pyon Yong-rip
13. Ri Yong-mu
14. Kim Kyong-hui
15. Kim Yang-gon
16. Kim Yong-il
17. Pak To-chun
18. Choe Ryong-hae
19. Jang Song-thaek
20. Ju Kyu-chang
21. Kim Rak-hui
22. Thae Jong-su
23. Kim Phyong-hae
24. Kim Jong-gak
25. U Tong-chuk
26. Kim Chang-sop
27. Mun Kyong-dok
28. Ri Thae-nam
29. O Kuk-ryol
30. Kim Chol-man
31. Ri Ul-sol
32. Jon Ha-chol
33. Kang Nung-su
34. Ro Tu-chol
35. Jo Pyong-ju
36. Han Kwang-bok
37. Paek Se-bong
38. Ri Yong-su
39. Choe Hui-jong
40. O Il-jong
41. Kim Jong-im
42. Chae Hui-jong
43. Kim Ki-ryong
44. Jang Pyong-gyu
45. Kim Pyong-ryul
46. Hong In-bom
47. Ri Man-gon
48. Ju Yong-sik
49. Kwak Pom-gi
50. O Su-yong
51. Ro Pae-gwon
52. Pak Thae-dok
53. Kim Hi-thaek
54. Kang Yang-mo
55. Rim Kyong-man
56. Kim Kyong-ok
57. Kim Myong-guk
58. Kim Won-hong
59. Hyon Chol-hae
60. Han Tong-gun
61. Jo Kyong-chol
62. Pak Jae-gyong
63. Pyon In-son
64. Yun Jong-rin
65. Jong Myong-do
66. Ri Pyong-chol
67. Choe Sang-ryo
68. Kim Yong-chol
69. Kang Phyo-yong
70. Kim Hyong-ryong
71. Ri Yong-hwan
72. Kim Chun-sam
73. Choe Kyong-song
74. Ri Myong-su
75. Jon Hui-jong
76. Ri Yong-gil
77. Hyon Yong-chol
78. Choe Pu-il
79. Yang Tong-hun
80. Ri Pong-juk
81. Kim Song-chol
82. Pak Kwang-chol
83. Ri Pyong-sam
84. Jon Chang-bok
85. O Kum-chol
86. Kim In-sik
87. Kim Song-dok
88. Ryo Chun-sok
89. Pak Sung-won
90. Ri Yong-chol
91. Pak Ui-chun
92. Kim Hyong-sik
93. Kim Thae-bong
94. Jon Kil-su
95. Ri Mu-yong
96. An Jong-su
97. Ri Ryong-nam
98. Ryu Yong-sop
99. Pak Myong-chol
100. Kim Yong-jin
101. Jang Chol
102. Song Ja-rip
103. Kim Jong-suk
104. Kang Tong-yun
105. Kim Pyong-ho
106. Cha Sung-su
107. Ryang Man-gil
108. Yun Tong-hyon
109. Ko Pyong-hyon
110. Ri Pong-dok
111. Pak Jong-gun
112. Choe Yong-dok
113. Jong In-guk
114. Jon Ryong-guk
115. Ri Hyong-gun
116. Hwang Sun-hui
117. Paek Kye-ryong
118. Kim Tong-il
119. Kim Tong-i
120. Ri Jae-il
121. Pak Pong-ju
122. Jong Myong-hak
123. Kang Kwan-il
124. Hwang Pyong-so
125. Kwon Hyok-bong
126. Hong Sung-mu
127. Kim U-ho
128. Han Chang-sun
129. Ri Chun-il
130. Ri Thae-sop
131. Jo Song-hwan
132. Tong Yong-il
133. Ri Chang-han
134. Ko Su-il
135. Ri Kuk-jun
136. Sin Sung-hun
137. Ri Thae-chol
138. Yang In-guk
139. Ri Hi-su
140. Ri Chol
141. Hyon Sang-ju
142. Ri Myong-gil
143. Ro Song-sil
144. Tong Jong-ho
145. Kang Min-chol
146. Kim Hui-yong
147. Jo Yong-chol
148. Hwang Hak-won
149. An Tong-chun
150. Paek Ryong-chon
151. Hong Kwan-sun
152. Ri Su-yong
153. Kim Yong-ho
154. Pang Ri-sun
155. Choe Chun-sik
156. Ri Je-son
157. Ri Sang-gun
158. Ri Hong-sop
159. Cha Yong-myong
160. Kang Kwan-ju
161. Thae Hyong-chol
162. Kim Pyong-hun
163. Kim Kye-gwan
164. Han Chang-nam
165. Kim Chang-myong
166. Jon Chang-rim
167. O Chol-san
168. Son Chong-nam
169. Jong Un-hak
170. Cha Kyong-il
171. Kang Ki-sop
172. Choi Tae-il
173. Choe Yong-do
174. Ri Yong-ju
175. Jon Kwang-rok
176. Ri Chan-hwa
177. So Tong-myong
178. Jon Song-ung
179. Ji Jae-ryong
180. Kim Yong-jae
181. Ri Yong-ho
182. Hong So-hon
183. Kim Tong-il
184. Kim Tong-un
185. Kim Pong-ryong
186. Jo Jae-yong
187. Choe Chan-gon
188. Ryom In-yun
189. Kim Chon-ho
190. Jang Ho-chan
191. Song Kwang-chol
192. Ri Ki-su
193. Ri Jong-sik
194. Choe Hyon
195. Jang Myong-hak
196. Kang Hyong-bong
197. Kim Chung-gol
198. Kim Yong-gwang
199. Choe Kwan-jun
200. Jang Yong-gol
201. Kim Myong-sik
202. Ho Song-gil
203. No Kwang-chol
204. Jong Pong-gun
205. Pak Chang-bom
206. Choe Pong-ho
207. Jong Mong-phil
208. Jon Kyong-son
209. Ri Song-gwon
210. Choe Yong
211. Kim Thae-mun
212. Kim Yong-suk
213. Cha Jin-sun
214. Ri Min-chol
215. Ri Il-nam
216. Kim Chang-su
217. Pak Myong-sun
218. Choe Pae-jin
219. Kim Chol
220. Sim Chol-ho
221. O Ryong-il
222. Kye Yong-sam
223. Ryu Hyon-sik
224. Ko Myong-hui
225. Pang Yong-uk
226. Jang Jong-ju
227. Ho Kwang-uk
228. Ji Tong-sik
229. Jong Pong-sok
230. Choe Kwon-su
231. Kim Yong-dae
232. Ryu Mi-yong

== Lying in state ==
On 20 December, Kim Jong Il's embalmed body lay in state in a glass coffin at the Kumsusan Memorial Palace, where his father Kim Il Sung is also interred, for an 11-day mourning period prior to the funeral. Like his father, Kim's body was covered in a red flag and surrounded by blossoms of his namesake flowers, red kimjongilia. As expected the body was placed next to his father's bier following the funeral and mourning period. As solemn music played, Kim Jong Un entered the hall to view his father's bier, surrounded by military honour guards. He observed a moment of solemn silence, then circled the bier, followed by other officials.

On 24 December, Kim Jong Un made a third visit to the palace where his father's body is lying in state. At this broadcast, Jang Sung-taek, whom South Korean intelligence assumed would play larger roles supporting the heir, stood with military uniform near young Kim, who wept this time, as he paid respects to Kim Jong Il's body lying in state.

== Funeral and memorial service ==
External videos
- North Korea holds state funeral for 'dear leader' Kim Jong-il, from The Guardian

The funeral itself occurred on 28 December. The 40-kilometre (25 mi), 3-hour funeral procession was covered in snow (which local newscasters described as "heaven's tears") as soldiers beat their chests and cried out "Father, Father". A Lincoln Continental limousine carried a giant portrait of Kim Jong Il. Jong Il's casket, draped by the Korean Workers' Party flag, was carried on top of another Lincoln Continental hearse while Kim Jong Un and his uncle Jang Sung-taek were immediately behind. Army chief of the general staff Ri Yong-ho and defence minister Vice-Marshal Kim Yong-chun walked along the opposite side of the vehicle during the procession segments in the Kumsusan Memorial Palace. The procession returned to Kumsusan Palace where Jong-un stood flanked by the top party and military officials who are expected to be his inner circle of advisers as rifles fired 21 times, then saluted again as goose stepping soldiers carrying flags and rifles marched by the palace square. Reportedly, Jong Il's body has been embalmed and put on display indefinitely in the manner of Kim Il Sung and other Communist leaders such as Vladimir Lenin, Mao Zedong, and Ho Chi Minh.

The convoy during the funeral procession was composed of lead patrol cars, the funeral hearse and its escorts, military escorts, motorised colour guards, an OB van of Korean Central Television, various cars (including a fleet of black Mercedes), and trucks carrying wreaths and five military bands from the KPA.

On the day of the memorial service, 29 December, Chairman of the Presidium, Kim Yong-nam, gave an address to mourners gathered in Kim Il-sung Square.

Kim Yong-nam told mourners that "The great heart of comrade Kim Jong-il has ceased to beat... such an unexpected and early departure from us is the biggest and the most unimaginable loss to our party and the revolution," and that North Korea would "transform the sorrow into strength and courage 1,000 times greater under the leadership of comrade Kim Jong-un."

The chairman also affirmed Kim Jong Un's position as his father's successor saying "Respected Comrade Kim Jong-un is our party, military and country's supreme leader who inherits great comrade Kim Jong-il's ideology, leadership, character, virtues, grit and courage".

General Kim Jong-gak addressing the memorial service on behalf of the military, saying "Our people's military will serve comrade Kim Jong-un at the head of our revolutionary troops and will continue to maintain and complete the Songun accomplishments of great leader Kim Jong-il". Songun refers to Kim Jong Il's policy of prioritising the "military first" in economic decisions.

Kim Jong Un did not make an address but stood with his head bowed, watching from a balcony of the Grand People's Study House, overlooking the square. He was flanked by his aunt, Kim Kyong-hui, her husband, Jang Sung-taek, and senior party and military officials.

After the speeches and a nationwide observance of three-minute silence, a row of heavy artillery guns were fired off in a 21-gun salute followed by a cacophony of sirens, horns and whistles sounded off simultaneously from trains and ships across the country to mark the end of the mourning period. The assembly concluded with a military band playing The Internationale. State television then broadcast a military choir and wind band performing The Song of General Kim Jong Il to formally conclude.

Kim Jong Un's elder brothers, Kim Jong-nam and Kim Jong-chol, are not known to have been in attendance either at the lying in state or on either date, the funeral or the memorial service.

The funeral showcased seven officials who are believed to be mentors or major aides to Kim Jong Un: Jang Song-taek, Mr. Kim's uncle and a vice-chairman of the National Defense Commission; Kim Ki-nam, North Korea's propaganda chief; Choe Tae-bok, the party secretary in charge of external affairs; Vice Marshal Ri Yong-ho, head of the military's general staff; Kim Yong-chun, the defence minister; Kim Jong-gak, a four-star general whose job is to monitor the allegiance of other generals; and U Dong-chuk, head of the North's secret police and spy agency.

On 1 January 2012, the Japanese daily Yomiuri Shimbun reported that Kim Jong-nam secretly flew to Pyongyang from Macau on 17 December 2011, after learning about his father's death that day and is presumed to have accompanied Kim Jong Un when paying his last respects to their father. He left after a few days to return to Macau and was not in attendance at the funeral in order to avoid speculation about the succession.

According to Daily NK, anyone who did not participate in the organised mourning sessions or did not seem genuine enough in their sorrow were sentenced to at least six months in a labour camp. Mourners were also barred from wearing hats, gloves or scarves even though the temperature that day was −2.4 °C (27.7 °F)—presumably so authorities could check to make sure they were displaying sufficient grief. North Korea angrily denied this accusation, blaming it on "reptile media" in the pay of the South Korean government. A photo slideshow from The Los Angeles Times does show multiple mourners with gloves and scarves.

== Reports of mourning ==
The Korean Central News Agency (KCNA) claimed that strange natural phenomena occurred in North Korea around the time of Kim Jong Il's death. In the past, the North Korean government has been known to encourage stories of miraculous deeds and supernatural events credited to Kim Il Sung and Kim Jong Il. KCNA also claimed that more than five million North Koreans, more than 25% of the national population, had shown up to mourn Kim Jong Il.

== See also ==
- Death and state funeral of Kim Il Sung
