= Kim Kuk-thae =

Elder apparatchik of the Workers Party of Korea

Chairman of the Inspection Commission of the Workers' Party of Korea
- In office 28 September 2010 – 13 December 2013
- Leader: Kim Jong Il; Kim Jong Un
- Preceded by: Ru Tuk-nam
- Succeeded by: Hong In-bom

Personal details
- Born: 27 August 1924 Kankyōhoku Province, Korea, Empire of Japan
- Died: 13 December 2013 (aged 89) Pyongyang, North Korea
- Party: Workers' Party of Korea

Korean name
- Hangul: 김국태
- Hanja: 金國泰
- RR: Gim Guktae
- MR: Kim Kukt'ae

Kim Kuk-thae (Korean: 김국태; 27 August 1924 – 13 December 2013) was an elder apparatchik of the Workers' Party of Korea, the ruling party in North Korea.

== Life ==
Kim was born in North Hamgyong Province as the eldest son of Kim Il Sung's trusted general Kim Chaek. He attended North Korea's most prestigious schools for cadres, including Mangyongdae Revolutionary School and Kim Il Sung University, and started working in the Workers' Party of Korea from the late 1940s. In 1963, he was appointed general to serve as deputy director of the General Political Bureau of the Korean People's Army to 1968, where he worked to consolidate Kim Il Sung's political control over the army. In 1968 he was made an alternate member of the WPK Central Committee (promoted to full member at the 5th Party Congress in 1970) and director of the Propaganda and Agitation Department, where he worked closely with Kim Jong Il. As the propaganda department fell under the future leader's control, Kim was transferred to director of the Culture Department in 1971 and president of the Kim Il Sung Higher Party School in 1976, but then he apparently fell out of favor and was exiled as ambassador to Ethiopia.

Kim Kuk-thae was called back to North Korea in 1980 to arrange preparations of the 6th Party Congress. He received the Order of Kim Il Sung in 1982. He was promoted again to a number of leading positions, including director of the Propaganda Department (1983–1984), director of the Education Department (1984–1985), director of the Cadres Department (1985–1990), president of the Higher Party School (1990–1992).

In 1993 Kim was made secretary for party cadre affairs and director of the Cadres Department, with overall responsibility over personnel appointment and management, and was considered to be a close aide of Kim Jong Il. He also served as chairman of the Deputies' Credential Screening Committee of the Supreme People's Assembly for two terms (1998–2003, and 2009–2013), himself being a deputy since 1967. In 2010 he was transferred to chairman of the WPK Central Control Commission and promoted to the top decision-making Politburo. Although he was ranked number 7 in the committee that organized the funeral of Kim Jong Il in December 2011, he kept a low profile under Kim Jong Un, mainly disappearing from public after summer 2012.

== Death ==
He died on 13 December 2013 from heart failure after a five-decade career, and was laid in state in the Central Workers' Hall (home of the General Federation of Trade Unions of Korea) in Pyongyang before being buried in the Patriotic Martyrs' Cemetery.

On his funeral committee were:

1. Kim Yong-nam
2. Pak Pong-ju
3. Choe Ryong-hae
4. Ri Yong-gil
5. Jang Jong-nam
6. Kim Kyong-hui
7. Kim Ki-nam
8. Choe Thae-bok
9. Pak To-chun
10. Kim Yong-chun
11. Yang Hyong-sop
12. Kang Sok-ju
13. Ri Yong-mu
14. O Kuk-ryol
15. Kim Won-hong
16. Kim Yang-gon
17. Kim Yong-il
18. Kim Phyong-hae
19. Kwak Pom-gi
20. Mun Kyong-dok
21. Choe Pu-il
22. Kim Chang-sop
23. Ro Tu-chol
24. Jo Yon-jun
25. Thae Jong-su
26. Choe Yong-rim
27. Hyon Chol-hae
28. Ri Pyong-sam
29. Ju Kyu-chang
30. Ri Yong-su
31. Paek Kye-ryong
32. Han Kwang-bok
33. O Il-jong
34. Kim Jong-im
35. Kim Chung-hyop
36. Han Kwang-sang
37. Kim Kyong-ok
38. Ri Chae-il
39. Choe Hwi
40. Kim Man-song
41. Chon Il-chun
42. Jong Myong-hak
43. Kim Hi-thak
44. Paek Ryong-chon
45. Hong In-bom
46. Ri Man-gon
47. O Su-yong
48. Pak Yong-ho
49. Pak Thae-dok
50. Kim Chun-sop
51. Pak Chong-nam
52. Ri Sang-won
53. Kang Yang-mo
54. Rim Kyong-man
