= Kim Yang-gon =

North Korean politician (1942–2015)

- 김양건
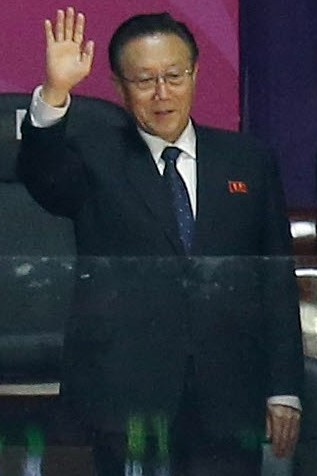
- Kim Yang-gon at Closing Ceremony of Incheon Asian Games 2014
- Born: 24 April 1942; Anju-si, Heian'nan Province, Korea, Empire of Japan
- Died: 29 December 2015 (aged 73); North Korea

Kim Yang-gon (Korean: 김양건, 24 April 1942 – 29 December 2015) was a North Korean politician and a senior official of the ruling Workers' Party of Korea.

== Early career ==
Kim Yang-gon started his political career as a vice-director of the party's International Liaison Department in 1986, and during this time he also oversaw relations with Japan as head of the DPRK-Japan Friendship Association. He was a recipient of the top Order of Kim Il Sung in 1995. He was promoted to director in 1997 and visited China multiple times during his tenure. In 2005 he also received a position as "councilor" to the National Defence Commission.

== Promotion ==
Several months after the death of Rim Tong-ok, Kim Yang-gon, considered a confidant to Kim Jong Il, was appointed to replace him as director of the United Front Department of the Workers' Party in March 2007. His first assignment as head of relations with South Korea was a visit to Seoul in November to discuss rapprochement measures with Unification Minister Lee Jae-jeong. At the Party Conference held in September 2010, Kim was also appointed secretary for united front and South Korea policies of the Secretariat and alternate member of the Politburo.

Kim Yang-gon kept his position under Kim Jong Un, and he was awarded the newly created Order of Kim Jong Il in July 2012. He visited South Korea again in October 2014 to attend the closing ceremony of the 2014 Asian Games with Hwang Pyong-so and Choe Ryong-hae, and in late August 2015 to negotiate a deal to halt military provocations around the Demilitarized Zone.

== Death ==
In December 2015, North Korea's news agency reported that Kim Yang-gon died in a car accident. He was lying in state in Sojang Club in Pyongyang and honored in a state funeral.

He was replaced in January 2016 by Kim Yong-chol.

Kim Yang-gon's funeral committee was composed of:

1. Kim Jong Un
2. Kim Yong-nam
3. Hwang Pyong-so
4. Pak Pong-ju
5. Kim Ki-nam
6. Choe Ryong-hae
7. Choe Tae-bok
8. Pak Yong-sik
9. Ri Yong-gil
10. Yang Hyong-sop
11. Kang Sok-ju
12. Ri Yong-mu
13. O Kuk-ryol
14. Kim Won-hong
15. Kwak Pom-gi
16. O Su-yong
17. Kim Pyong-hae
18. Choe Pu-il
19. Ro Tu-chol
20. Jo Yon-jun
21. Im Chol-ung
22. Kim Tok-hun
23. Kim Yong-jin
24. Ri Mu-yong
25. Ri Chol-man
26. Kim Yong-dae
27. Ryu Mi-yong
28. Ri Il-hwan
29. Ri Man-gon
30. Kim Man-song
31. Choe Sang-gon
32. Ri Yong-rae
33. Kim Jong-im
34. Kim Jung-hyop
35. Hong In-bom
36. Kim Kyong-ok
37. Choe Hwi
38. Ri Pyong-chol
39. Kim Yong-su
40. Jon Il-chun
41. Jong Myong-hak
42. Kim Hi-taek
43. Jon Kyong-nam
44. So Hong-chan
45. No Kwang-chol
46. Rim Gwang-il
47. Jo Nam-jin
48. Ryom Chol-song
49. Jo Kyong-chol
50. Yun Tong-hyon
51. Kim Hyong-ryong
52. Kim Yong-chol
53. O Kum-chol
54. Tae Jong-su
55. Kim Su-gil
56. Pak Tae-song
57. Kim Nung-o
58. Jon Sung-hun
59. Pak Yong-ho
60. Pak Tae-dok
61. Kim Jae-ryong
62. Pak Jong-nam
63. Ri Sang-won
64. Kang Yang-mo
65. Rim Kyong-man
66. Kim Wan-su
67. Won Tong-yon
68. Ri Jong-hyok
69. Kim Jin-guk
70. Pak Jin-sik

Party political offices
Preceded by Rim Tong-ok	Director of the United Front Department of the Workers' Party of Korea; 2007–2015	Succeeded by Kim Yong-chol
