= Members of the Control Commission of the Workers' Party of Korea =

North Korean government body

Member of the Control Commission
- Type: Member of highest WPK control organ
- Reports to: Central Committee
- Appointer: Central Committee
- Formation: 30 August 1946
- First holder: 1st Central Inspection Commission
- Final holder: 7th Control Commission
- Abolished: 10 January 2021
- Succession: 8th Central Auditing Commission

Members of the Control Commission (CC) of the Workers' Party of Korea were elected by the 1st Plenary Session of a WPK Central Committee. In the two predecessor organisations, the Central Inspection Commission of the Workers' Party of North Korea (WPNK) and the Inspection Committee of the Workers' Party of South Korea (WPSK), members were elected by the party congress. Control Commission members were responsible for ensuring party discipline, enforcing and protecting the party rules, and punishing members who breached rules and regulations.

During the Kim Il Sung and Kim Jong Il era only three individuals out of 57 were re-elected to a second term as CC member. CC membership was the least stable of all Central Committee organs in this time period. Political scientist Dae-sook Suh argues that "At least two explanations can be made. The first is that the committee takes its job seriously and enforces the rules to the letter, criticizing the majority of the members of the Central Committee and thus creating a high rate of turnover, even in its own committee. The second is that this committee is not different from other committees, that appointment is political". If the former is correct then the main responsibility of CC members was to carry out the policies of the Supreme Leader. However, in the Kim Jong Un era, three individuals out of thirteen were re-elected for a second term.

Its last term, the seventh, was elected on 9 May 2016. The 2nd Plenary Session of the 7th WPK Central Committee dismissed Hong In-bom as CC chairman and appointed Jo Yon-jun in his place. According to Michael Madden of 38 North "Interestingly Jo [Yon Jun], OGD's most senior deputy director, was appointed Chairman of the Inspection Commission (a.k.a. the Control Commission), a position which is typically appointed to elderly and experienced OGD personnel (such as Mr Jo) who entering a period of semi-retirement." In 2019 it spearheaded an anti-corruption investigation in North Pyongan Province. A commentator quipped that "The inspection team arrived on December 20 and is continuing to investigate local government officials. [...] The team is looking at officials working in customs bureaus, factories and enterprises, and even in storage facilities." It was a highly unusual investigation; most Inspection investigations lasts for a couple of weeks but this one lasted for three months. The investigation was part of Kim Jong Un's anti-corruption campaign.

== Title history ==
Title	Established	Abolished	Established by
Member of the Central Inspection Commission of the Workers' Party of North Korea	30 August 1946	30 March 1948	1st Congress of the Workers' Party of North Korea
Member of the Inspection Committee of the Workers' Party of South Korea	24 November 1946	24 June 1949	Congress of the Workers' Party of South Korea
Member of the Inspection Commission of the Workers' Party of North Korea	30 March 1948	24 June 1949	2nd Congress of the Workers' Party of North Korea
Member of the Inspection Commission of the Workers' Party of Korea	24 June 1949	14 October 1980	1st Joint Plenary Session of the 2nd Central Committee of the Workers' Party of Korea
Member of the Control Commission of the Workers' Party of Korea	14 October 1980	10 January 2021	6th Congress of the Workers' Party of Korea

== Officers ==
=== Chairman ===
Officeholder	Hangul	Took office	Left office	Duration
Kim Yong-bom	김용범	30 August 1946	7 September 1947	1 year and 8 days
Choe Won-taek	최원택	24 November 1946	24 June 1949	2 years and 212 days
Chang Sun-myong	장순명(張順明)	30 March 1948	6 August 1953	5 years and 129 days
Kim Ung-gi	김응기(金應基)	6 August 1953	29 April 1956	2 years and 267 days
Kim Ik-son	김익선(金翊善)	29 April 1956	12 November 1970	14 years and 197 days
Kim Yo-jung	김려중(김여중)	12 November 1970	14 October 1980	9 years and 337 days
So Chol	서철	14 October 1980	30 September 1992	11 years and 352 days
Jon Mun-sop	전문섭	October 1992	29 December 1998	6 years and 86 days
Pak Yong-sok	박용석	January 1999	17 March 2007	8 years and 75 days
?		2007	2010	
Kim Kuk-thae	김국태	28 September 2010	13 December 2013	3 years and 76 days
?		13 December 2013	10 May 2016	2 years and 149 days
Hong In-bom	홍인범	10 May 2016	7 October 2017	1 year and 150 days
Jo Yon-jun	조연준	7 October 2017	31 December 2019	2 years and 85 days
Ri Sang-won	이상원	31 December 2019	11 January 2021	1 year and 11 days

=== First Vice Chair ===
Officeholder	Hangul	Took office	Left office	Duration
Jong Myong-hak	정명학	28 September 2010	11 January 2021	10 years and 105 days

=== Vice Chairman ===
Officeholder	Hangul	Took office	Left office	Duration
Kim Hyong-son	김형선	24 November 1946	24 June 1949	2 years and 212 days
Yi Sok-ku	이석구	24 November 1946	24 June 1949	2 years and 212 days
Yi Ki-sok	이기석	24 June 1949	6 August 1953	4 years and 43 days
Ho Song-taek	허성택	6 August 1953	6 August 1953	8 years and 43 days
Yun Ung-yong	윤응룡	6 August 1953	18 September 1961	8 years and 43 days
Hwang Won-bo	황원보	18 September 1961	12 November 1970	9 years and 55 days
Kim Chang-dok	김창덕	18 September 1961	12 November 1970	9 years and 55 days
Pak Chun-hyok	박춘혁	18 September 1961	12 November 1970	9 years and 55 days
O Yong-bong	오영봉	12 November 1970	14 October 1980	9 years and 337 days
Kim Chwa-hyok	김좌혁	14 October 1980	?	?
Chu Chang-bok	주창복	14 October 1980	?	?
Ri Tuk-nam	리득남	2007	11 January 2021	14 years and 10 days

== Members ==
Rank (Note: Highest rank the individual attained during tenure.)	Name	Hangul	Took office	Left office	Term	Duration
4	An Pae-ok	안배옥	12 November 1970	14 October 1980	5th	9 years and 337 days
4	Cha Kwan-sok	차관석	28 September 2010	9 May 2016	6th	5 years and 224 days
6	Cha Sun-gil	차순길	28 September 2010	9 May 2016	6th	5 years and 224 days
5	Chang Chol	장철	30 March 1948	29 April 1956	2nd	8 years and 30 days
2	Chang Hae-u	장해우	30 March 1948	29 April 1956	2nd	8 years and 30 days
1	Chang Sun-myong	장순명	30 March 1948	29 April 1956	2nd	8 years and 30 days
2	Chin Pan-su	진반수	30 August 1946	30 March 1948	WPNK	1 year and 213 days
6	Choe Ton-gun	최돈근(崔敦根)	29 April 1956	18 September 1961	3rd	5 years and 142 days
1	Choe Won-taek	최원택	24 November 1946	24 June 1949	WPSK	2 years and 212 days
7	Choe Yong-dal	최용달	30 August 1946	30 March 1948	WPNK	1 year and 213 days
5	Chong Kwan-yul	정관률	14 October 1980		6th	?
6	Chong Myong-yong	정명룡	12 November 1970	14 October 1980	5th	9 years and 337 days
3	Chu Chang-bok	주창복	14 October 1980		6th	?
7	Han Sok-kwan	한석관	14 October 1980		6th	?
9	Han Yong-uk	한영욱	24 November 1946	24 June 1949	WPSK	2 years and 212 days
7	Ho Hak-song	허학송	29 April 1956	18 September 1961	3rd	5 years and 142 days
2	Ho Song-taek	허성택	29 April 1956	18 September 1961	3rd	5 years and 142 days
1	Hong In-bom	홍인범	9 May 2016	7 October 2017	7th	1 year and 151 days
5	Hong Song-u	홍성우	24 November 1946	24 June 1949	WPSK	2 years and 212 days
6	Hong Tok-yu	홍덕유	24 November 1946	24 June 1947	WPSK	2 years and 212 days
2	Hwang Won-bo	황원보	18 September 1961	12 November 1970	4th	9 years and 55 days
1	Jo Yon-jun	조연준	7 October 2017	31 December 2019	7th	2 years and 85 days
2	Jong Myong-hak	정명학	28 September 2010	11 January 2021	6th–7th	10 years and 105 days
10	Kim Chae-ryong	김채룡	30 August 1946	30 March 1948	WPNK	1 year and 213 days
6	Kim Chan	김찬	30 August 1946	30 March 1948	WPNK	1 year and 213 days
3	Kim Chang-dok	김창덕	18 September 1961	12 November 1970	4th	9 years and 55 days
4	Kim Chang-hwan	김창환	14 October 1980		6th	?
2	Kim Chwa-hyok	김좌혁	14 October 1980		6th	?
2	Kim Hyong-son	김형선	24 November 1946	24 June 1949	WPSK	2 years and 212 days
1	Kim Ik-son	김익선	29 April 1956	12 November 1970	3rd–4th	14 years and 197 days
3	Kim Ko-mang	김고망	30 March 1948	29 April 1956	2nd, was a miner in Sadong mine	8 years and 30 days
1	Kim Kuk-thae	김국태	28 September 2010	13 December 2013	6th	3 years and 76 days
5	Kim Kum-chol	김금철	9 May 2016	11 January 2021	7th	4 years and 247 days
7	Kim Myong-chol	김명철	9 May 2016	11 January 2021	7th	4 years and 247 days
4	Kim Sung-hun	김성훈	30 August 1946	30 March 1948	WPNK	1 year and 213 days
1	Kim Ung-gi	김응기	6 August 1953	29 April 1956	2nd	2 years and 267 days
1	Kim Yo-jung	김려중(김여중)	12 November 1970	14 October 1980	5th	9 years and 337 days
5	Kim Yo-jung	김려중(김여중)	29 April 1956	18 September 1961	3rd	5 years and 142 days
1	Kim Yong-bom	김용범	30 August 1946	7 September 1947	WPNK	1 year and 8 days
4	Kim Yong-hwan	김용환	9 May 2016	11 January 2021	7th	4 years and 247 days
7	Kim Yong-son	김용선	28 September 2010	11 January 2021	6th–7th	10 years and 105 days
8	Nam Kyong-hun	남경훈	24 November 1946	24 June 1949	WPSK	2 years and 212 days
7	O Yong	오영	24 November 1946	24 June 1949	WPSK	2 years and 212 days
6	O Yong-bong	오영봉	18 September 1961	14 October 1980	4th–5th	19 years and 26 days
4	Pak Chun-hyok	박춘혁	18 September 1961	12 November 1970	4th	9 years and 55 days
9	Pak Chun-sok	박춘석	30 August 1946	30 March 1948	WPNK	1 year and 213 days
5	Pak Tok-man	박덕만	28 September 2010	9 May 2016	6th	5 years and 224 days
8	Pak Ung-ik	박응익	30 August 1946	30 March 1948	WPNK	1 year and 213 days
4	Pang Hak-se	방학세	30 March 1948	29 April 1956	2nd	8 years and 30 days
3	Pang U-yong	방우용	30 August 1946	30 March 1948	WPNK	1 year and 213 days
1	Ri Sang-won	이상원	31 December 2019	11 January 2021	7th	1 year and 11 days
3	Ri Tuk-nam	리득남	28 September 2010	11 January 2021	6th–7th	10 years and 105 days
1	So Chol	서철	14 October 1980	30 September 1992	6th	11 years and 352 days
11	Yi Chong-hwan	이정환	24 November 1946	24 June 1949	WPSK	2 years and 212 days
6	Yi Chong-ik	리종익	30 March 1948	29 April 1956	2nd	8 years and 30 days
4	Yi Hyo-sun	리효순	29 April 1956	18 September 1961	3rd	5 years and 142 days
2	Yi Ki-sok	이기석	24 June 1949	6 August 1953	2nd	4 years and 43 days
5	Yi Kwang-pil	이광필	12 November 1970	14 October 1980	5th	9 years and 337 days
5	Yi Min-su	이민수	18 September 1961	12 November 1970	4th	9 years and 55 days
3	Yi Sok-ku	이석구	24 November 1946	24 June 1949	WPSK	2 years and 212 days
7	Yi Sung-u	리승우	18 September 1961	12 November 1970	4th	9 years and 55 days
5	Yi Tong-hwa	리동화	30 August 1946	30 March 1948	WPNK	1 year and 213 days
6	Yi Yong-mo	리용모	14 October 1980		6th	?
7	Yi Yong-nin	리룡린	12 November 1970	14 October 1980	5th	9 years and 337 days
3	Yi Yong-nin	리룡린	18 September 1961	12 November 1970	4th	9 years and 55 days
10	Yi Yong-uk	이영욱	24 November 1946	24 June 1949	WPSK	2 years and 212 days
11	Yu Yong-gi	유용기	30 August 1946	30 March 1948	WPNK	1 year and 213 days
4	Yun Il-chu	윤일주	24 November 1946	24 June 1949	WPSK	2 years and 212 days
3	Yun Ung-yong	윤응룡	29 April 1956	18 September 1961	3rd	5 years and 142 days
