= Hong Son-ok =

North Korean politician

Personal details
- Born: 28 March 1950 (age 76) North Pyongan Province
- Party: Workers' Party of Korea

Korean name
- Hangul: 홍선옥
- Hanja: 洪仙玉
- RR: Hong Seonok
- MR: Hong Sŏnok

Hong Son-ok (Korean: 홍선옥; born 28 March 1950) is a senior North Korean politician. She has served as the Vice Chairwoman of the Presidium of the Supreme People's Assembly (SPA) and Chairwoman of the Committee for Cultural Relations with Foreign Countries. These posts took her to many foreign countries and meetings with foreign dignitaries. In 2013 she became the first female to be appointed Secretary General of the SPA Presidium. She served in that capacity until 2018. Hong has chaired many of North Korea's friendship associations with foreign countries.

== Early life ==
Hong Son-ok was born on 28 March 1950 in North Pyongan Province. Her father was Hong Won-gil. She attended Kim Il Sung University and graduated from the University of International Affairs.

== Career ==
Early in her career, Hong was the Vice Chairwoman of the Presidium of the Supreme People's Assembly (SPA) and Vice Chairwoman of the Committee for Cultural Relations with Foreign Countries. She met many foreign dignitaries and traveled abroad in these posts.

Later, Hong served as the Secretary General of the SPA Presidium, replacing . She was appointed on 1 April 2013 at the seventh session of the 12th SPA, replacing Thae Hyong-chol. She was re-appointed to the same post on 9 April 2014 after the 2014 North Korean parliamentary election. Hong was the first female ever in that role, prompting Michael Madden of 38 North to write: "While Secretary-General is a largely ceremonial position, her appointment may point to a new emphasis on women as key players in the DPRK's relatively male-dominated political culture." Hong was replaced by Jong Yong-guk as the Secretary General on 11 April 2018 at the sixth session of the 13th SPA.

Hong was elected to the SPA in 2003 (187th electoral district), 2009 (230th), and most recently in 2014 (64th electoral district in Ryokpho).

Hong is a full member of the 7th Central Committee of the Workers' Party of Korea since May 2016.

Hong is the Chairwoman of the Committee for Comfort Women and Victims of the Pacific War Compensation since February 2000, where she had already served before as a permanent member. She is also the Vice Chairman of the Socialist Women's Union of Korea. Hong was previously the head of the Reunification Office of the Armament Reduction and Peace Institute from November 1991.

Hong has headed many of North Korea's friendship associations. She was previously chairwoman of North Korea's friendship associations with Indonesia and Austria, and vice chairwoman in associations dealing with relations with Pakistan, and China. She currently heads the German and Russian friendship associations and is the vice chairwoman of the association with Finland. She has been chairwoman of the friendship association with Switzerland since December 2009, vice chairwoman of the friendship association with Poland since November 2006, and vice chairwoman of the friendship association with Bulgaria since March 2006.

In 2015, she was on the funeral committee of Ri Ul-sol.
