= Control Commission of the Workers' Party of Korea =

1946–2021 North Korean government body

The Control Commission of the Workers' Party of Korea (Korean: 조선로동당 중앙위원회 검열위원회) was a control organ established at the 1st WPNK Congress in 1946 and abolished at the 8th WPK Congress in 2021. According to the party rules it was responsible for investigating if party members breached party rules and policies. Party members who breached either rules or contravened the policies of the party could be judged as anti-party counterrevolution figures by the Inspection Commission.

In 2021 its duties and responsibilities was transferred to the Central Auditing Commission.

== Chairmen ==
- Kim Yong-bom (1946–47) – of Workers' Party of North Korea as part of the 1st Central Inspection Commission of the Workers' Party of North Korea
- Choe Won-taek (1946–49) – of Workers' Party of South Korea
- Chang Sun-myong (1948–53)
- Kim Ung-gi (1953–56)
- Kim Ik-son (1956–70)
- Kim Yo-jung (1970–80)
- So Chol (1980–92)
- Jon Mun-sop (1992–98)
- Pak Yong-sok (1999–07)
- Ru Tuk-nam (2007–10)
- Kim Kuk-thae (2010–13)
- Hong In-bom (2016–17)
- Jo Yon-jun (2016–17)
- Ri Sang-won (2017–21)
