= Yun Tong-hyon =

North Korean general and politician (died 2026)

- 윤동현

Member of the 7th Central Committee
- In office May 2016 – September 2026
- Supreme Leader: Kim Jong Un

Member of the Supreme People's Assembly

Personal details
- Died: c. 14 September 2026
- Party: Workers' Party of Korea

Military service
- Allegiance: North Korea
- Branch/service: Korean People's Army
- Rank: Sangjang (Colonel-general)

Yun Tong-hyon (Korean: 윤동현; died c. 14 September 2026) was a North Korean general and politician. He was the member of the Central Committee of the Workers' Party of Korea and member of the Supreme People's Assembly, North Korea's unicameral parliament.

== Life and career ==
Yun became a colonel-general in 2014 by order of the Supreme Commander of the Armed Forces of North Korea, Kim Jong Un. In 1998 and 2003 he was elected to the 10th and 11th convocations of the Supreme People's Assembly, respectively. In 2016, following the decisions made by the 7th WPK Congress, he was elected to the 7th Central Committee of the Workers' Party of Korea. In April 2019 he was elected to the 14th convocation of the Supreme People's Assembly, representing the Pongsusan (170th electoral district).

He was a member of the funeral committee of Kim Chol-man, Jon Pyong-ho, Kim Yang-gon, Ri Ul-sol, Kim Yong-chun. Following the death of Kim Jong Il in December 2011, he was also a member of his 232-members funeral committee.

His death was announced on 15 September 2026, when North Korean state media reported that Kim Jong Un sent a wreath to his bier a day earlier.

== Awards and honors ==
A picture of Yun shows him wearing the ribbons to all decorations awarded to him.
