= Kim Pyong-ho =

North Korean politician

Chief Editor of Rodong Sinmun
- Incumbent
- Assumed office 2017
- Leader: Kim Jong Un
- Preceded by: Ri Yong-sik

Personal details
- Born: Pyongyang, North Korea
- Party: Workers' Party of Korea
- Occupation: Politician

Korean name
- Hangul: 김병호
- Hanja: 金炳鎬
- RR: Gim Byeongho
- MR: Kim Pyŏngho

Kim Pyong-ho (Korean: 김병호; born 1960) is a North Korean politician. He is a member of the Central Committee of the Workers' Party of Korea and the chief editor of the party's organ, Rodong Sinmun.

== Biography ==
He served as vice president of Korean Central News Agency, and was appointed president on February 22, 2010. At the 3rd Conference of the Workers' Party of Korea held in September 2010, he was elected as a member of the Politburo of the Central Committee of the Workers' Party of Korea. Through the decision of the 2nd plenary session of the 7th Central Committee of the Party held in October 2017, he was appointed chief editor of Rodong Sinmun.

As president of KCNA, he helped reached a deal with the Associated Press to open the wire service's Pyongyang bureau in 2012. The bureau is located in KCNA's headquarters building.

In February 2012, he was awarded the Order of Kim Jong Il. Following the death of Kim Jong Il's in December 2011, he served as a member of his funeral commission.
