= Kim Sung-du =

North Korean politician (born 1958)

Chairman of the Education Commission

14th term
- Incumbent
- Assumed office 11 April 2019
- President: Kim Jong Un
- Premier: Kim Tok-hun; Kim Jae-ryong

13th term
- In office 9 April 2014 – 11 April 2019
- Premier: Pak Pong-ju
- Chairman: Kim Jong Un
- Premier: Pak Pong-ju
- Preceded by: Kim Yong-jin

Minister of General Education

13th term
- In office 9 April 2014 – 11 April 2019
- Chairman: Kim Jong Un
- Premier: Pak Pong-ju
- Preceded by: Kim Yong-jin
- Succeeded by: Post abolished

Personal details
- Born: 1 March 1958 (age 68)
- Party: Workers' Party of Korea

Kim Sung-du (Korean: 김승두; born March 1, 1958) is a politician of North Korea. He is a member of the 7th convocation of the Central Committee of the Workers' Party of Korea.

== Biography ==
Born in North Hamgyong Province, he was appointed as the chair of the Board of Education in March 2012 after the Dean of the College of Science. He served as the Chairman of the Korea-Cuba Unity Committee, the National Sports Leadership Committee, and the Korea-Egypt Friendship Association. In May 2016, he was appointed a member of the 7th Central Committee of the Workers' Party of Korea at the 7th Congress of the Workers' Party of Korea. In September 2009, he was elected to the 12th convocation of the Supreme People's Assembly, and in 2014 once again, to the 13th convocation, representing the 328th electoral district (Changryon).
