= Jon Kwang-ho =

North Korean politician

Vice Premier of North Korea

14th term
- In office 11 April 2019 – 18 January 2021 Serving with Ro Tu-chol, Im Chol-ung, Kim Tok-hun, Ri Ju-o, Ri Ryong-nam, Tong Jong-ho, Ko In-ho and Kim Il-chol.
- President: Kim Jong Un
- Premier: Kim Tok-hun; Kim Jae-ryong

Personal details
- Citizenship: North Korean
- Party: Workers' Party of Korea
- Occupation: Politician

Jon Kwang-ho (Korean: 전광호) is a politician of North Korea. He served as Vice Premier of North Korea in the Cabinet and is a member of the Central Committee of the Workers' Party of Korea. He was member of the 13th convocation to the Supreme People's Assembly. Since August 2020 he is an alternate (candidate) member of the Politburo of the Workers' Party of Korea.

== Biography ==
He was appointed the head of South Hamgyong Province Provincial Planning Commission. In 2011 he became Chairman of the South Hamgyong Province People's Committee, and the National Sports Guidance Committee in 2017. In October 2017, he was elected to the Central Committee of the Workers' Party of Korea. In March 2014, he was elected as the 13th delegate to the Supreme People's Assembly. When Kim Young-chun died in 2018, he was a member of his funeral committee. On August 13, 2020 at the 16th Politburo meeting of the 7th Central Committee of the WPK he was appointed to an alternate (candidate) member of the Politburo of the Workers' Party of Korea.
