= Jon Sung-hun =

North Korean politician (born 1951)

- 전승훈

Chairman of the WPK North Hamgyong Provincial Committee
- In office 2014–2017
- Supreme Leader: Kim Jong Un
- Preceded by: O Su-yong
- Succeeded by: Ri Hi-yong

Personal details
- Born: 27 October 1951 (age 74) South Hwanghae Province, North Korea
- Party: Workers' Party of Korea
- Education: Kim Chaek University of Technology

Jon Sung-hun (Korean: 전승훈; born October 27, 1951) is a North Korean politician. He was an alternate of the 7th Central Committee and a member of the 8th Central Committee of the Workers' Party of Korea and member of the 13th convocation of the Supreme People's Assembly.

== Biography ==
Born in South Hwanghae Province on October 27, 1951, he graduated from Kim Chaek University of Technology. In March 1993, he was head of the Metal Industry Department, and in November 1995, he became president of the Black Metal Import and Export Company, and in April 1998, he became the Vice Chairman of the Metal Industry Department. In September of the same year, he was appointed to the Cabinet Metal Machinery Industry Ministry. In September 2003, he retired from the metal machinery industry when he became the Vice Premier of North Korea. In December 2007, he served as Chairman of the North of the North-South Economic Cooperation Committee. After becoming a member of the Minister of Metal Industry in November 2011, he was appointed Deputy Prime Minister in August of the following year. After retiring from the Metal Industry Ministry in October of the same year, he served as the party secretary of the North Hamgyong Province from April 2014 to October 2017. In May 2016, he was appointed a member of the 7th Central Committee of the Workers' Party of Korea at the 7th Congress of the Workers' Party of Korea.

He was a member of the funeral committees of Ri Jong-ok in September 1999, Yon Hyong-muk in October 2005, Hong Song-nam in April 2009, Pak Song-chol in October 2008, Hong Song-nam in April 2009, Jon Pyong-ho in July 2014, Ri Ul-sol in November 2015, Kim Yang-gon in December 2015, and Kang Sok-ju in May 2016.
