= Han Kwang-sang =

North Korean politician

- Supreme Leader: Kim Jong-un

Personal details
- Citizenship: North Korean
- Party: Workers' Party of Korea

Han Kwang-sang (Korean: 한광상) is a North Korean politician. He is a member of the Central Committee of the Workers' Party of Korea.

== Biography ==
In 2014 he was elected to the 13th convocation of the Supreme People's Assembly, representing the 91st (Tongmyon) electoral district. In accordance with the decision of the 7th Congress of the Workers' Party of Korea he was elected an alternate (candidate) member of the 7th Central Committee of WPK. In December 2018 he was reported to head the Finance and Accounting Department of the Workers' Party of Korea. Since June 2022 he is an alternate (candidate) member of the 8th Politburo of the 8th WPK CC.
