= Jo Nam-jin =

North Korean military officer

Deputy head of the KPA General Political Department
- Supreme Leader: Kim Jong Un

Personal details
- Party: Workers' Party of Korea

Military service
- Allegiance: North Korea
- Branch/service: Korean People's Army
- Rank: Sangjang (Colonel-general)

Jo Nam-jin is a North Korean military officer.

== Biography ==
He is known to serve as the deputy director of the KPA General Political Department and head of the Organization Department of the Korean People's Army. He holds the rank of Colonel-General. He was a member of the funeral committee of Kim Yong-chun and of Kim Yang-gon.
