= Kang Jong-gwan =

North Korean politician (born 1959)

Minister of Land and Maritime Transport

14th term
- Incumbent
- Assumed office 11 April 2019
- President: Kim Jong Un
- Premier: Kim Tok-hun; Kim Jae-ryong

13th term
- In office 9 April 2014 – 11 April 2019
- Chairman: Kim Jong Un
- Premier: Pak Pong-ju

12th term
- In office 14 April 2012 – 9 April 2014
- Chairman: Kim Jong Un
- Premier: Pak Pong-ju; Choe Yong-rim
- Preceded by: Ra Ton-hui

Personal details
- Born: 1959; North Korea
- Citizenship: North Korean
- Political party: Workers' Party of Korea

Korean name
- Hangul: 강종관
- RR: Gang Jonggwan
- MR: Kang Chonggwan

Kang Jong-gwan (Korean: 강종관, born 1959) is a North Korean politician. He is also a candidate for the Political Bureau of the Central Committee of the Workers' Party Korea. He is member of the 14th convocation of the Supreme People's Assembly and also serves as Minister of Land and Maritime Transportation in the Cabinet of North Korea.

== Biography ==
In 2003, he became the administrator of Sinuiju Port and member of the People's Assembly of North Pyongan Province. In 2007, he served as the head of department at the Ministry of Land, Transport and Maritime Affairs, and in December 2007 served as the chairman of the development section of Haeju Port in the West Coast Special Zone. In May 2012, he was appointed to the Land and Maritime Transport Minister, replacing Ra Tong-hui.。2012年5月晉升升為該部門的部長 In May 2016, at the 7th Congress of the Workers' Party of Korea was elected as a candidate member of the 7th Central Committee of the Workers' Party of Korea.
