= Yang Sung-ho =

North Korean politician

Member of the Politburo of the Workers' Party of Korea
- General Secretary: Kim Jong Un

Minister of Agriculture

Minister of Heavy Industry

Vice Premier of North Korea
- In office 18 January 2021 – 19 January 2026
- Premier: Kim Tok-hun; Pak Thae-song

Personal details
- Born: North Korea
- Citizenship: North Korean
- Party: Workers' Party of Korea

Korean name
- Hangul: 양승호
- RR: Yang Seungho
- MR: Yang Sŭngho

Yang Sung-ho (Korean: 양승호) is a North Korean politician. He was a Vice Premier (2021-2026) and a member of the Politburo of the Central Committee of the Workers' Party of Korea (WPK). He served as Minister of Machinery and Industry, replacing Lee Jong Guk and since 2021 is serving as Minister of Agriculture in the North Korean Cabinet.

== Biography ==
After working as manager of the Daan Heavy Machinery Federation, he was elected as a candidate (alternate) member for the 7th Central Committee at the 7th Congress of the Workers' Party of Korea (WPK) held on May 9, 2016, and in June of the same year. He was elected as deputy to the 13th convocation of the Supreme People's Assembly. At the 4th Plenary Session of the 7th Party Central Committee held on April 10, 2019, he was re-elected as a candidate for the Party Central Committee. He was appointed Minister of Machinery Industry at the First Session of the 14th Supreme People's Assembly held on April 11 the following day. At the 5th Plenary Meeting of the 7th Party Central Committee held on December 28 of the same year, he was elected as a member of the Party Central Committee. At the 3rd session of the 14th Supreme People's Assembly held on April 12, 2020, he was dismissed as Minister of Machinery Industry and appointed as Vice Premier.

At the 8th Congress of the WPK, which was held from January 5, 2021, he was elected to the Executive Committee of the Congress and re-elected as a member of the 8th Central Committee of the WPK. In 18 January 2021, during 4th SPA Session, was also appointed to the Minister of Agriculture position.

He was publicly dismissed on January 19, 2026, during a speech by WPK General Secretary Kim Jong-un, who said:

"To put it simply, it was like hitching a goat to a cart, an accidental error in our cadre appointment process"... "After all, it's oxen that pull carts, not goats."
