= Ri Thae-nam =

North Korean politician

- Portrait of Ri Thae-nam

Secretary of the WPK South Pyongan Provincial Committee
- In office 1996–2003
- Supreme Leader: Kim Jong Il
- Succeeded by: Hong Song-nam

Secretary of the WPK South Hamgyong Provincial Committee
- In office 2003–2010
- Supreme Leader: Kim Jong Il
- Succeeded by: Hong In-bom

Personal details
- Born: February 26, 1938 Yomju County, North Pyongan Province, Korea, Empire of Japan
- Died: 2013
- Citizenship: North Korean
- Party: Workers' Party of Korea
- Education: Pyongyang Higher Mechanical School

Ri Thae-nam (Korean: 리태남; February 26, 1938 – 2013) was a North Korean politician who was Vice Premier of North Korea between 2010 and 2011. He was a candidate for the Political Bureau of the Central Committee of the Workers' Party of Korea as well as member of the Supreme People's Assembly, North Korea's unicameral parliament.

== Biography ==
Ri Tae Nam was born on March 26, 1938, in Yomju County, North Pyongan Province. A graduate of the Higher Mechanical School in Pyongyang. At the beginning of his professional career he worked as an engineer in the metallurgical industry. From the late 1970s and 1980s, he was the secretary of party organizations at the refinery of two steelworks from 1978 at the refinery in the city of Kaesong, from July 1982 at the steelworks in Kangso, and from June 1986 at the steelworks Ch'ŏllima in the city of Nampo, with which he was also associated after leaving the factory.

From January 1987, he was the secretary of the district party structures in the Ch'ŏllima district of Nampo. In 1992–1995 he worked in the municipal authorities of Nampo, where he dealt with economic affairs. From January 1996 to September 2003, he was Secretary of the WPK South Hamgyong Provincial Committee, and from September 2003 to June 2010, Secretary of the WPK South Pyongan Provincial Committee. At that time he also became the Vice Premier in the Cabinet of North Korea, which he remained until April 2011.

A deputy of the Supreme People's Assembly during the 9th 10th and 11th convocations, he sat on the SPA Budget Committee in the last two terms. In March 2009 (while still being the head of the WPK in the South Pyongan Province), he became the secretary of the party organization at the Sungni Mechanical Vehicles Plant in the city of Tokchon in the South Pyongan Province. Pursuant to the provisions of the 3rd Conference of the Workers' Party of Korea, on September 28, 2010, he was elected a candidate member of the Political Bureau of the WPK Central Committee. After the death of Kim Jong Il in December 2011, Ri T'ae Nam was in a high, 28th place in the 232-person Funeral Committee. He was awarded the Order of Kim Il Sung in April 1992 and Order of Kim Jong Il in February 2012.
