= Ri Yong-rae =

North Korean politician

- 리영래

Member of the 7th Central Committee of the WPK
- In office May 2016 – Incumbent
- Supreme Leader: Kim Jong Un

Director of the Civil Defense Department

Personal details
- Citizenship: North Korean
- Party: Workers' Party of Korea

Ri Yong-rae (Korean: 리영래) is a North Korean politician. He is a member of the Central Committee of the Workers' Party of Korea.

== Biography ==
Born in Jangryong of the People's Army of Korea, he was promoted to Lieutenant General in February 2012 after being a Major general in April 2002. In May 2016, at the 7th Congress of the Workers' Party of Korea, he was appointed to the 7th Central Committee of the Workers' Party of Korea and the head of the Civil Defense Department of the Workers' Party of Korea. In March 2014, he was elected at the 13th convocation to the Supreme People's Assembly.
