= Kim Yong-su (politician) =

North Korean politician

Member of the 7th Central Committee of the WPK
- In office May 2016 – Incumbent
- Supreme Leader: Kim Jong Un

Personal details
- Citizenship: North Korean
- Party: Workers' Party of Korea

Kim Yong-su (김용수) is a North Korean politician. He is a member of the Central Committee of the Workers' Party of Korea.

== Biography ==
He is a member of the Central Committee of the Workers' Party of Korea and serves as the director of the Finance and Accounting Department of the Workers' Party of Korea. In 2007, he was Chairman of the Chagang Province People's Committee. In May 2016, in accordance with the decisions of the 7th Congress of the Workers' Party of Korea, he was elected to the 7th Central Committee of the Workers' Party of Korea. He was a member of the funeral committee of Ri Ul-sol.
