= Kim Jung-hyop =

North Korean politician

- 김중협

Member of the 7th Central Committee of the WPK
- In office May 2016 – 2021
- Supreme Leader: Kim Jong Un

Personal details
- Born: 1938 (age 87–88)
- Party: Workers' Party of Korea

Kim Jung-hyop (Korean: 김중협, born 1938) is a North Korean politician. He is a member of the Central Committee of the Workers' Party of Korea, head of the Party's Office of Documents and served as a member of the 13th convocation of the Supreme People's Assembly and director of the Documents Management Office of the Central Committee.

== Biography ==
Born in Korea, Empire of Japan in 1938, he was nominated for the Central Committee of the Workers' Party of Korea on December 1992 and was appointed chief of the Rodong Sinmun newspaper in 2003 as the successor to Chil Nam (최칠남). In 2010, he was dismissed from the head of the Rodong Sinmun, and in September, he was also dismissed from the Party Central Committee candidate. In May 2016, at the 7th Congress of the Workers' Party of Korea, he was elected a full (voting) member of the 7th Central Committee of the Workers' Party of Korea and head of the Office of Documents and Management.
