= Kang Kwan-il =

North Korean politician

- 강관일
- Occupations: politician, alternate member of WPK Central Committee

Kang Kwan-il is a North Korean politician. He is an alternate member of the Central Committee of the Workers' Party of Korea (WPK).

== Career ==
Starting in March 1964, he served as vice-chair of the WPK in Haeju city. In December 1980 he was appointed head of the Ministry of Construction. In April 1987, he was appointed Chief Secretary of the WPK at Songjin Steel Complex.

In September 2010, he was elected an alternate member of the Central Committee of the Workers' Party of Korea.

Kang served as a member of the national mourning committee upon the death of Kim Jong Il in December 2011.
