= Choe Sang-gon =

North Korean politician

Minister of Higher Education

14th term
- In office 11 April 2019 – 18 January 2021
- President: Kim Jong Un
- Premier: Kim Tok-hun; Kim Jae-ryong
- Preceded by: Thae Hyong-chol
- Succeeded by: Ri Kuk-chol

President of Kim Il Sung University

14th term
- In office 11 April 2019 – 18 January 2021
- President: Kim Jong Un
- Premier: Kim Tok-hun; Kim Jae-ryong
- Preceded by: Thae Hyong-chol
- Succeeded by: Ri Kuk-chol

Personal details
- Born: 28 April 1953 (age 72) South Hamgyong Province, North Korea
- Citizenship: North Korean
- Party: Workers' Party of Korea

Choe Sang-gon (Korean: 최상건, born 28 April 1953) is a politician of the Democratic People's Republic of Korea. He is a member of the Central Committee of the Workers' Party of Korea and was also a member of the 13th convocation of the Supreme People's Assembly. He serves as Minister of Higher Education in the Cabinet of North Korea and the President of Kim Il Sung University.

== Biography ==
Choe was born on 28 April 1953 in South Hamgyong Province.

In 2008, he received a Ph.D. from the National Degree Conferment Ceremony, and was appointed Vice Chairman and then Chairman of the National Science and Technology Committee in August 2012 as a successor to Ri Cha-pang. In 2014, he served as deputy to the 13th convocation of the Supreme People's Assembly, and in May 2016 he became a member of the 7th convocation of the Central Committee of the Workers' Party of Korea.
