= Kim Song-chol (politician) =

North Korean general

Member of the WPK Central Committee
- Supreme Leader: Kim Jong Il; Kim Jong Un

Personal details
- Party: Workers' Party of Korea

Military service
- Allegiance: North Korea
- Branch/service: Korean People's Army
- Rank: Sangjang (Colonel-general)

Kim Song-chol (Korean: 김송철; Hanja: 金松哲) is a North Korean politician and officer of the Korean People's Army.

== Biography ==
He served as deputy to the Supreme People's Assembly. He also served as the commander of 105th Armored Corps based in South Hwanghae Province. Following the 3rd WPK Conference he was elected to the Central Committee of the Workers' Party of Korea. He was also elected to the 7th Central Committee in May 2016. He was a member of the funeral committee of Kim Jong Il in December 2011. In 2015 he was member of the funeral committee of Ri Ul-sol. In February 2012 he once again became colonel-general after being demoted some time before that.
