= 1st Central Inspection Commission of the Workers' Party of North Korea =

The 1st Central Inspection Commission of the Workers' Party of North Korea (WPNK) (Korean: 제1차 북조선로동당 중앙위원회 검열위원회) was elected at the 1st WPNK Congress held in August 1946. It consisted of 11 members, and remained active until the 2nd WPNK Congress when the 2nd Inspection Commission was elected.

== Members ==
11 members were elected to relieve the grievances of the domestic faction being underrepresented in the party at the time.Members and their political affiliations are as follows:

1. Kim Yong-bom (김용범) (Chairman) (Domestic faction)
2. Chin Pan-su (진반수,陳班秀) (Deputy Chairman) (Yan'an faction)
3. Pang U-yong (방우용,方禹鏞) (Deputy Chairman) (Yan'an faction)
4. Kim Sung-hun (김승훈) (Note: source material wrongly spells it as kim sung-hum)(Domestic faction)
5. Yi Tong-hwa (리동화) (Soviet Korean faction)
6. Kim Chan (김찬) (Soviet Korean faction)
7. Choe Yong-dal (최용달) (Domestic faction)
8. Kim Chae-ryong (김채룡) (Domestic faction)
9. Pak Chun-sop (박춘섭) (Domestic faction)
10. Yu Yong-gi (유영기) (Domestic faction)
11. Pak Ung-ik (박응익) (Domestic faction)
