= Ri Hong-sop =

North Korean scientist

Ri Hong-sop (Korean: 리홍섭, born 1940) is a North Korean scientist.

Ri is a former director of the Yongbyon Nuclear Scientific Research Center. In 2005 he served on the program committee of the International Atomic Energy Agency's Nuclear Energy and Security (NUSEC) conference in Salzburg, Austria. According to the United Nations, Ri has played a "key role in the ... [DPRK's] nuclear program”.

In January 2016 Ri, along with a fellow associate in the nuclear weapons program Hong Sung-mu, was the first in line to receive a medal from Kim Jong Un for success in the January 2016 nuclear test. The two men are collectively known as North Korea's "nuclear duo".
