= Pak Thae-dok =

North Korean politician

Vice Chairman of the Workers' Party of Korea Central Committee
- In office 7 October 2017 – 10 January 2021
- Chairman: Kim Jong Un

Member of the WPK Politburo
- In office 2016 – August 2020
- Preceded by: 2020

Personal details
- Born: 1955 (age 70–71) South Pyongan Province, North Korea
- Citizenship: North Korean
- Party: Workers' Party of Korea
- Occupation: Politician

Korean name
- Hangul: 박태덕
- RR: Bak Taedeok
- MR: Pak T'aedŏk

Pak Thae-dok (Korean: 박태덕, born 1955) is a North Korean politician, he held the position of the Vice Chairman of the Workers' Party of Korea (WPK) with a general affairs portfolio till 2020. Pak is also an alternate member of the Politburo of the WPK, a full member of the Central Committee of the WPK, and a deputy to the Supreme People's Assembly (SPA).

== Career ==
Pak Thae-dok was born in 1955. Pak has held various "instructor and guidance cadre positions". He was appointed secretary of the Workers' Party of Korea (WPK) city committee of Anju, South Pyongan in 2006. His term began in January of the following year. At the 2010 3rd Conference of the WPK, Pak became a member of the Central Committee of the WPK. He was also appointed chief secretary of the WPK provincial committee of North Hwanghae Province. During his term, North Hwanghae was expanded by absorbing three counties that had previously been part of the city of Pyongyang.

Pak was appointed to the Bills Committee of the Supreme People's Assembly (SPA) in April 2012. He was elected deputy to the SPA from Electoral District 390 (Pongsan) in the 2014 North Korean parliamentary election.

The 7th Congress of the WPK in 2016 elected Pak to its 7th Central Committee as a full member. He was also elevated to the chairmanship of the North Hwanghae WPK provincial committee. Pak became a Vice Chairman of the WPK and an alternate member of its Politburo at the second plenary meeting of the 7th Central Committee in October 2017. His portfolio as a Vice Chairman of the party probably covered general affairs. At some point, he was also a director of a department of the Central Committee of the party.

Pak was fired from his post by Politburo of the Workers' Party of Korea in February 2020 alongside Ri Man-gon from the post of vice chairman of the central committee after a speech by Kim Jong Un criticizing corruption among the bureaucracy.

== See also ==
- Politics of North Korea
