= Kang Hyong-bong =

North Korean politician (born 1957)

- 강형봉
- Occupations: politician, alternate member of WPK Central Committee

Kang Hyong-bong (Korean: 강형봉; born May 20, 1957) is a North Korean politician. He is an alternate member of the Central Committee of the Workers' Party of Korea, and a delegate to the Supreme People's Assembly.

== Career ==
Kang served as general manager of the Tukjang Youth Coal Mine starting in 2003, and since January 2007, has served as an official in the Ministry of Power and Coal Industries. In September 2010, he was elected an alternate member of the Central Committee of the Workers' Party of Korea.

In August 2003, he also served as a delegate in the 11th Supreme People's Assembly. Since December 2012, he is the Chairman of the People's Committee of South Pyongan Province.

Kang served as a member of the national mourning committee upon the death of Kim Jong Il in December 2011.
