= Kim Jong-im =

North Korean politician (1935–2026)

- 김정임

Director of the Party History Institute of the WPK
- In office December 2009 – July 2026
- Supreme Leader: Kim Jong Il; Kim Jong Un
- Preceded by: Kim Ki-nam

Personal details
- Born: Unknown
- Died: c. 22 July 2026
- Citizenship: North Korean
- Party: Workers' Party of Korea

Kim Jong-im (Korean: 김정임) was a North Korean politician. She was one of the few women (among others, Kim Kyong-hui, Kim Rak-hui, and Han Kwang-bok) who performed the highest functions in the North Korean government apparatus. She was a member of the Central Committee of the Workers' Party of Korea and was a member of the Supreme People's Assembly.

== Life and career ==
In 1985 she became the deputy director of the Party History Institute, formally an organizational unit of the Central Committee of the Workers' Party of Korea. From December 2009 she was the head of the Institute, replacing Kim Ki-nam. Pursuant to the decision of the 3rd Conference of the Korean Workers' Party, on 28 September 2010, Kim was elected for the first time to the Central Committee. In 2009 she was elected to the 12th convocation of the Supreme People's Assembly, representing the 157th electoral district. In 2016 she was elected full member of the 7th Central Committee of the Workers' Party of Korea.

After the death of Kim Jong Il in December 2011, Kim Jong-im was ranked in 41st place in the 232-person Funeral Committee.

On 23 July 2026, North Korean state media reported that Kim Jong-im had died. Kim Jong Un had sent a wreath to her bier on 22 July. However, the Korean Central News Agency did not mention her exact death date.
