= Kim Kyong-ok =

North Korean politician and general (1930/1931–2024)

- 김경옥

Member of the Central Military Commission of the WPK
- Supreme Leader: Kim Jong Il; Kim Jong Un

Personal details
- Born: 1930/1931
- Died: 11 January 2024 (aged 93)
- Party: Workers' Party of Korea

Military service
- Allegiance: North Korea
- Branch/service: Korean People's Army
- Rank: General

Kim Kyong-ok (Korean: 김경옥, 1930/1931 – 11 January 2024) was a North Korean politician and four-star army general in the Korean People's Army. He was a member of the Central Committee of the Workers' Party of Korea, first deputy director of the Organization and Guidance Department, and served as member of the Supreme People's Assembly.

== Biography ==
In 2008, he was appointed first vice-chairman of the Central Committee. Pursuant to the provisions of the 3rd Conference of the Workers' Party of Korea, on 28 September 2010, Kim Kyong-ok was appointed a member of the Central Military Commission of the WPK, and also sat in the Central Committee for the first time. He was also promoted to a four-star general in September 2010 and was a general by appointment only, having no formal military experience. In addition, he was the first deputy director of the Organization and Guidance Department at the Central Committee. He took this position in 2008. In the OGD, Kim was in charge of security for the Supreme Leader, thus he oversees activities of the Guards Command and the WPK Military Security Command.

Member of the Supreme People's Assembly, North Korea's unicameral parliament, from the 10th convocation.

After the death of Kim Jong Il in December 2011, Kim Kyong-ok was in 56th place in the 232-person Funeral Committee. In 2013 he was member of the funeral committee of Kim Kuk-thae. In 2015 he was ranked 36 in the funeral committee of Kim Yang-gon. In February 2012 he was awarded the Order of Kim Jong Il.

General Kim was sanctioned by the United States in 2016 and the United Nations in 2017 for human rights abuses.

Kim died on 11 January 2024, at the age of 93.
