= Yu Chol-u =

North Korean official (born 1959)

Yu Chol-u (유철우) (born 8 August 1959) was the Director of the North Korean National Aerospace Development Administration from sometime before 2015 to 2019.

== See also ==
- Politics of North Korea
