= Kim Chol =

North Korean Army officer (born c. 1960)

- Born: c. 1960
- Died: c. 2012
- Occupation: former Vice Minister of defence
- Employer: Korean People's Army
- Known for: work as minister
- Political party: Worker's Party of Korea
- Criminal charge: treason
- Criminal status: executed

Korean name
- Hangul: 김철
- Hanja: 金哲
- RR: Gim Cheol
- MR: Kim Ch'ŏl

Kim Chol (Korean: 김철, c. 1960 – 2012), worked as a Vice Minister in the North Korean Army. He was allegedly purged and executed in spectacular fashion for "drinking and carousing" during the period of mourning for Kim Jong Il.

South Korean media reported that he was exploded by mortar bombardment, and not shot by firing squad. However, Foreign Policy observed the claims probably originated from gossip and noted that stories about violent deaths of North Korean elites tend to be "exaggerated."

Kim was one of 14 senior party, military, and government officials who were purged during Kim Jong Un's consolidation of power.

== See also ==
- Media coverage of North Korea
