= Hong In-bom =

North Korean politician

- 한성룡

Chairman of the WPK Control Commission
- In office May 2016 – October 2017
- Preceded by: Kim Kuk-thae
- Succeeded by: Jo Yon-jun

Personal details
- Citizenship: North Korean
- Party: Workers' Party of Korea
- Occupation: Politician, government official

Hong In-bom (Korean: 홍인범) is a North Korean politician. He is a member of the Central Committee of the Workers' Party of Korea and Chairman of the Control Commission of the Party Central Committee.

== Biography ==
Hong in Bŏm began his professional career as a journalist at the Korean Central News Agency in the late 1960s. Little is known about his clerical and political career before 1980, when he became a deputy member of the Central Committee of the PPK by virtue of the provisions of the 6th Congress of the Workers' Party of Korea.

From November 1982, secretary of the party organization at the coal company in Anju (South Pyongan Province). In March 1993 he became deputy director of the Organization and Planning Department of the Central Committee.

From June 2010, the head of the provincial structures of the Workers' Party of Korea in South Pyongan Province, in connection with the appointment of the previous head in the province, Ri Thae-nam, as the deputy prime minister of the DPRK. During the 3rd WPK Conference on 28 September 2010, he was elected a full member of the Central Committee for the first time.

In 2014 he was elected to the 13th convocation of the Supreme People's Assembly, representing Chongsong District.

After the death of Kim Jong-il in December 2011, Hong in Bŏm was in high, 46th place in the 232-person Funeral Committee.
