= Kim Chang-sop =

North Korean politician (1946–2020)

- 김창섭

Vice Minister of the State Security Department
- In office February 2015 – June 2020
- Supreme Leader: Kim Jong Un

Personal details
- Born: January 2, 1946 Unsan County, South Pyongan Province
- Died: June 9, 2020 (aged 74)
- Citizenship: North Korean
- Party: Workers' Party of Korea
- Education: Kim Il Sung Higher Party School
- Occupation: Politician

Kim Chang-sop (Korean: 김창섭; January 2, 1946 – June 9, 2020) was a North Korean politician who served as the Vice minister of the Ministry of State Security.

== Early life and education ==
Kim Chang-sop was born on January 2, 1946, in the Unsan County in South Pyongan Province. He joined the Korean People's Army in July 1963. He was a graduate of the Kim Il Sung Higher Party School.

== Career ==
He was the vice minister of the State Security Department and was the head of the Political Department of that agency. He has also been the deputy of the Supreme People's Assembly since the 11th convocation in September 2003.

During the 3rd Conference of the Workers' Party of Korea on September 28, 2010, he was elected as an alternate member of the Political Bureau of the Central Committee, and also for the first time sat in the Central Committee itself.

Following the death of Kim Jong Il in December 2011, Kim Chang-sop was ranked 26th in the 232-member Mourning Committee.

== Death ==
Kim Chang Sop died in June 2020. His death was announced by the Korean Central News Agency.
