= So Hong-chan =

North Korean general (born 1957)

Personal details
- Born: 30 December 1957 (age 68) Kangwon Province, North Korea
- Citizenship: North Korean
- Party: Workers' Party of Korea
- Occupation: Military officer, politician

Military service
- Allegiance: North Korea
- Branch/service: Korean People's Army
- Rank: General

So Hong-chan (Korean: 서홍찬) is a soldier and politician of the Democratic People's Republic of Korea. He is a member of the Central Committee of the Workers' Party of Korea and its central military commission.

== Biography ==
In April 2009, he was elected to the 12th convocation of the Supreme People's Assembly. In November of the same year, he was the first Vice-Minister of the People's Armed Forces, and in November 2015, he served as a member of the funeral committee at the funeral of Ri Ul-sol. In May 2016, the 7th Congress of the Workers' Party of Korea was elected as a member of the Party Central Committee. On April 15, 2017, he was promoted to the army general of the Korean People's Army through Command No. 00136 of the Supreme Commander of the Armed Forces of North Korea.
