= Han Kwang-bok =

North Korean politician

Vice Premier of North Korea
- In office June 7, 2010 – 2012
- Supreme Leader: Kim Jong Il

Personal details
- Citizenship: North Korean
- Party: Workers' Party of Korea

Korean name
- Hangul: 한광복
- Hanja: 韓光福
- RR: Han Gwangbok
- MR: Han Kwangbok

Han Kwang-bok (Korean: 한광복) is a North Korean politician who served as Vice Premier. She was born in the 1940s in the North Hamgyong Province, North Korea. She also served as the Minister for the Electronics Industry until she was replaced on 15 October 2012 by Kim Jae-seong.

== See also ==
- Government of North Korea
- List of elected or appointed female deputy heads of government
- Premier of North Korea
