= Jo Yon-jun =

North Korean politician (born 1937)

- 조연준

Chairman of the WPK Control Commission
- In office 2017–2019
- Preceded by: Hong In-bom
- Succeeded by: Ri Sang-won

Personal details
- Born: September 28, 1937 (age 88) South Hamgyong Province, North Korea

Korean name
- Hangul: 조연준
- RR: Jo Yeonjun
- MR: Cho Yŏnjun

Jo Yon-jun (Korean: 조연준; born September 28, 1937) is a North Korean politician. Jo is a candidate member of the Politburo of the Workers' Party of Korea (WPK) and former first deputy in the Organization and Guidance Department (OGD) of the Central Committee of the WPK.

In 2016, in a round of sanctions targeted at human rights abuses in North Korea, he was placed under sanctions by the United States as the man who is responsible for the execution of defectors from the country.
