= 7th Politburo of the Workers' Party of Korea =

The 7th Politburo of the Workers' Party of Korea (WPK), officially the Political Bureau of the 7th Central Committee of the Workers' Party of Korea (Korean: 제7기 조선로동당 중앙위원회 정치국), was elected by the 1st Plenary Session of the 7th Central Committee, in the immediate aftermath of the 7th WPK Congress. The composition of the 7th Politburo was changed on several occasions by plenary sessions of the 7th WPK Central Committee.

== Meetings ==
- Meeting: 9 April 2018
- Enlarged Meeting: 9 April 2019
- Enlarged Meeting: 28 February 2020
- Meeting: 11 April 2020
- 13th Meeting: 6–7 June 2020
- 14th Enlarged Meeting: 2 July 2020
- Enlarged Emergency Meeting: 25 July 2020
- 16th Meeting: 13 August 2020
- 17th Meeting: 25 August 2020
- 18th Meeting: 29 September 2020
- 19th Meeting: 5 October 2020
- 20th Enlarged Meeting: 15 November 2020
- 21st Enlarged Meeting: 29 November 2020
- 22nd Meeting: 29 December 2020

== Composition ==
=== Members ===
The following were elected as members of the 7th Politburo.

The names of members are listed according to the order of their election at the 1st plenary meeting of the 7th Central Committee. Members who have an en dash (—) in the Rank column were by-elected during the term of the 7th Central Committee.

Rank	Name	Korean	6th (Note: Status in the Politburo at the end of the 6th Central Committee's term.)	8th (Note: Status in the Politburo at the start of the 8th Central Committee's term.)
1	Kim Jong Un	김정은	Member	Member
2	Kim Yong-nam (Note: Kim Yong-nam was recalled as a member on 10 April 2019.)	김영남	Member	No
3	Hwang Pyong-so (Note: Hwang Pyong-so was recalled as a member in 2018.)	황병서	Member	No
4	Pak Pong-ju	박봉주	Member	No
5	Choe Ryong-hae	최룡해	Member	Member
6	Kim Ki-nam (Note: Kim Ki-nam was recalled as a member on 20 April 2018.)	김기남	Member	No
7	Choe Thae-bok (Note: Choe Thae-bok was recalled as a member on 10 April 2019.)	최태복	Member	No
8	Ri Su-yong (Note: Ri Su-yong was recalled as a member on 31 December 2019.)	리수용	No	No
9	Kim Phyong-hae (Note: Kim Phyong-hae was recalled as a member on 31 December 2019.)	김평해	Alternate	No
10	O Su-yong	오수용	Member	Member
11	Kwak Pom-gi (Note: Kwak Pom-gi was recalled as a member on 7 October 2017.)	곽범기	Member	No
12	Kim Yong-chol	김영철	No	Member
13	Ri Man-gon (Note: Ri Man-gon was recalled as a member on 7 October 2017.)	리만건	No	No
14	Yang Hyong-sop (Note: Yang Hyong-sop was recalled as a member on 10 April 2019.)	양형섭	Member	No
15	Ro Tu-chol (Note: Ro Tu-chol was recalled as a member on 31 December 2019.)	로두철	Alternate	No
16	Pak Yong-sik (Note: Pak Yong-sik was recalled as a member in 2018.)	박영식	No	No
17	Ri Myong-su (Note: Ri Myong-su was recalled as a member on 10 April 2019.)	리명수	Member	No
18	Kim Won-hong (Note: Kim Won-hong was recalled as a member on 7 October 2017.)	김원홍	Member	No
19	Choe Pu-il	최부일	Alternate	No
—	Pak Kwang-ho (Note: Pak Kwang-ho was directly by-elected as a member on 7 October 2017, but was recalled on 31 December 2019.)	박광호	No	No
—	Pak Thae-song (Note: Pak Thae-song was by-elected as a member on 7 October 2017, from alternate members, but was recalled on 13 August 2020.)	박태성	No	Member
—	Thae Jong-su (Note: Thae Jong-su was directly by-elected as a member on 7 October 2017, but was recalled on 31 December 2019.)	태종수	No	No
—	An Jong-su (Note: An Jong-su was directly by-elected as a member on 7 October 2017, but was recalled on 31 December 2019.)	안정수	No	No
—	Ri Yong-ho (Note: Ri Yong-ho was by-elected as a member on 7 October 2017, from alternate members, but was recalled on 31 December 2019.)	리용호	No	No
—	Kim Jong-gak (Note: Kim Jong-gak was directly by-elected as a member on 20 April 2018, from alternate members, but was recalled on 10 April 2019.)	김정각	No	No
—	Kim Jae-ryong (Note: Kim Jae-ryong was directly by-elected as a member on 10 April 2019.)	김재룡	No	Member
—	Choe Hwi (Note: Choe Hwi was by-elected as a member on 10 April 2019, from alternate members.)	최휘	No	No
—	Pak Thae-dok (Note: Pak Thae-dok was by-elected as a member on 10 April 2019, from alternate members, but was recalled on 28 February 2020. He returned as a member by being directly by-elected on 13 August 2020.)	박태덕	No	Alternate
—	Kim Su-gil (Note: Kim Su-gil was by-elected as a member on 10 April 2019, from alternate members.)	김수길	No	No
—	Thae Hyong-chol (Note: Thae Hyong-chol was directly by-elected as a member on 10 April 2019.)	태형철	No	Alternate
—	Jong Kyong-thaek (Note: Jong Kyong-thaek was by-elected as a member on 10 April 2019, from alternate members, but was recalled on 13 August 2020.)	정경택	No	Member
—	Ri Il-hwan (Note: Ri Il-hwan was directly by-elected as a member on 31 December 2019.)	리일환	No	Member
—	Ri Pyong-chol (Note: Ri Pyong-chol was by-elected as a member on 31 December 2019, from alternate members.)	리병철	No	Member
—	Kim Tok-hun (Note: Kim Tok-hun was by-elected as a member on 31 December 2019, from alternate members.)	김덕훈	No	Member
—	Pak Jong-chon (Note: Pak Jong-chon was by-elected as a member on 11 April 2020, from alternate members.)	박정천	No	Member

=== Alternate members ===
The following were elected as alternate members of the 7th Politburo.

The names of alternate members are listed according to the order of their election at the 1st plenary meeting of the 7th Central Committee. Alternate members who have an en dash (—) in the Rank column were by-elected during the term of the 7th Central Committee.

Rank	Name	Korean	6th (Note: Status in the Politburo at the end of the 6th Central Committee's term.)	8th (Note: Status in the Politburo at the start of the 8th Central Committee's term.)
1	Kim Su-gil (Note: Kim Su-gil was by-elected as a member on 10 April 2019.)	김수길	No	No
2	Kim Nung-o	김능오	No	No
3	Pak Thae-song (Note: Pak Thae-song was by-elected as a member on 7 October 2017.)	박태성	No	Member
4	Ri Yong-ho (Note: Ri Yong-ho was by-elected as a member on 7 October 2017.)	리용호	No	No
5	Im Chol-ung	임철웅	No	No
6	Jo Yon-jun	조연준	Alternate	No
7	Ri Pyong-chol (Note: Ri Pyong-chol was by-elected as a member on 31 December 2019.)	리병철	No	Member
8	No Kwang-chol	노광철	No	No
9	Ri Yong-gil	리영길	Alternate	Member
—	Ri Man-gon (Note: Ri Man-gon was by-elected as an alternate member on 7 October 2017, but was recalled on 10 April 2019.)	리만건	No	No
—	Choe Hwi (Note: Choe Hwi was by-elected as an alternate member on 7 October 2017, and as a member on 10 April 2019.)	최휘	No	No
—	Pak Thae-dok (Note: Pak Thae-dok was by-elected as an alternate member on 7 October 2017, and as a member on 10 April 2019.)	박태덕	No	Alternate
—	Kim Yo Jong (Note: Kim Yo Jong was by-elected as an alternate member on 7 October 2017, but was recalled on 10 April 2019. She returned as an alternate member by being by-elected on 11 April 2020.)	김여정	No	No
—	Jong Kyong-thaek (Note: Jong Kyong-thaek was by-elected as an alternate member on 7 October 2017, and as a member on 10 April 2019. He returned as an alternate member by being by-elected in 2020.)	정경택	No	Member
—	Jo Yong-won (Note: Jo Yong-won was by-elected as an alternate member on 10 April 2019.)	조용원	No	Member
—	Kim Tok-hun (Note: Kim Tok-hun was by-elected as an alternate member on 10 April 2019, and as a member on 31 December 2019.)	김덕훈	No	Member
—	Ri Ryong-nam (Note: Ri Ryong-nam was by-elected as an alternate member on 10 April 2019.)	리룡남	No	No
—	Pak Jong-nam (Note: Pak Jong-nam was by-elected as an alternate member on 10 April 2019.)	박정남	No	No
—	Ri Hi-yong (Note: Ri Hi-yong was by-elected as an alternate member on 10 April 2019.)	리히용	No	No
—	Jo Chun-ryong (Note: Jo Chun-ryong was by-elected as an alternate member on 10 April 2019, but was recalled on 31 December 2019.)	조춘룡	No	No
—	Kim Jong-gwan (Note: Kim Jong-gwan was by-elected as an alternate member on 31 December 2019.)	김정관	No	Member
—	Pak Jong-chon (Note: Pak Jong-chon was by-elected as an alternate member on 31 December 2019, and as a member on 11 April 2020.)	박정천	No	Member
—	Kim Hyong-jun (Note: Kim Hyong-jun was by-elected as an alternate member on 31 December 2019.)	김형준	No	No
—	Ho Chol-man (Note: Ho Chol-man was by-elected as an alternate member on 31 December 2019.)	허철만	No	Alternate
—	Ri Ho-rim (Note: Ri Ho-rim was by-elected as an alternate member on 31 December 2019.)	리호림	No	No
—	Kim Il-chol (Note: Kim Il-chol was by-elected as an alternate member on 31 December 2019.)	김일철	No	No
—	Ri Son-gwon (Note: Ri Son-gwon was by-elected as an alternate member on 11 April 2020.)	리선권	No	Alternate
—	Kim Yong-hwan (Note: Kim Yong-hwan was by-elected as an alternate member on 7 June 2020.)	김영환	No	Alternate
—	Pak Myong-sun (Note: Pak Myong-sun was by-elected as an alternate member on 13 August 2020.)	박명순	No	Alternate
—	Jon Kwang-ho (Note: Jon Kwang-ho was by-elected as an alternate member on 13 August 2020.)	전광호	No	No
