= Hwang Sun-hui =

North Korean politician (1919–2020)

Personal details
- Born: 3 May 1919 near Kankyōhoku Province (North Hamgyong Province), Korea, Empire of Japan
- Died: 17 January 2020 (aged 100) Pyongyang, North Korea
- Cause of death: Pneumonia
- Party: Workers' Party of Korea

Korean name
- Hangul: 황순희
- Hanja: 黃順姬
- RR: Hwang Sunhui
- MR: Hwang Sunhŭi
- IPA: [ɸwa̠ŋ sʰun.çi]

Hwang Sun-hui (Korean: 황순희; 3 May 1919 – 17 January 2020) was a North Korean politician who served in several high-ranking positions in the Workers' Party of Korea (WPK), including in the Supreme People's Assembly and the Central Committee of the WPK. She was affiliated with the Korean Revolution Museum from 1965, and was its director from 1990.

== Career ==
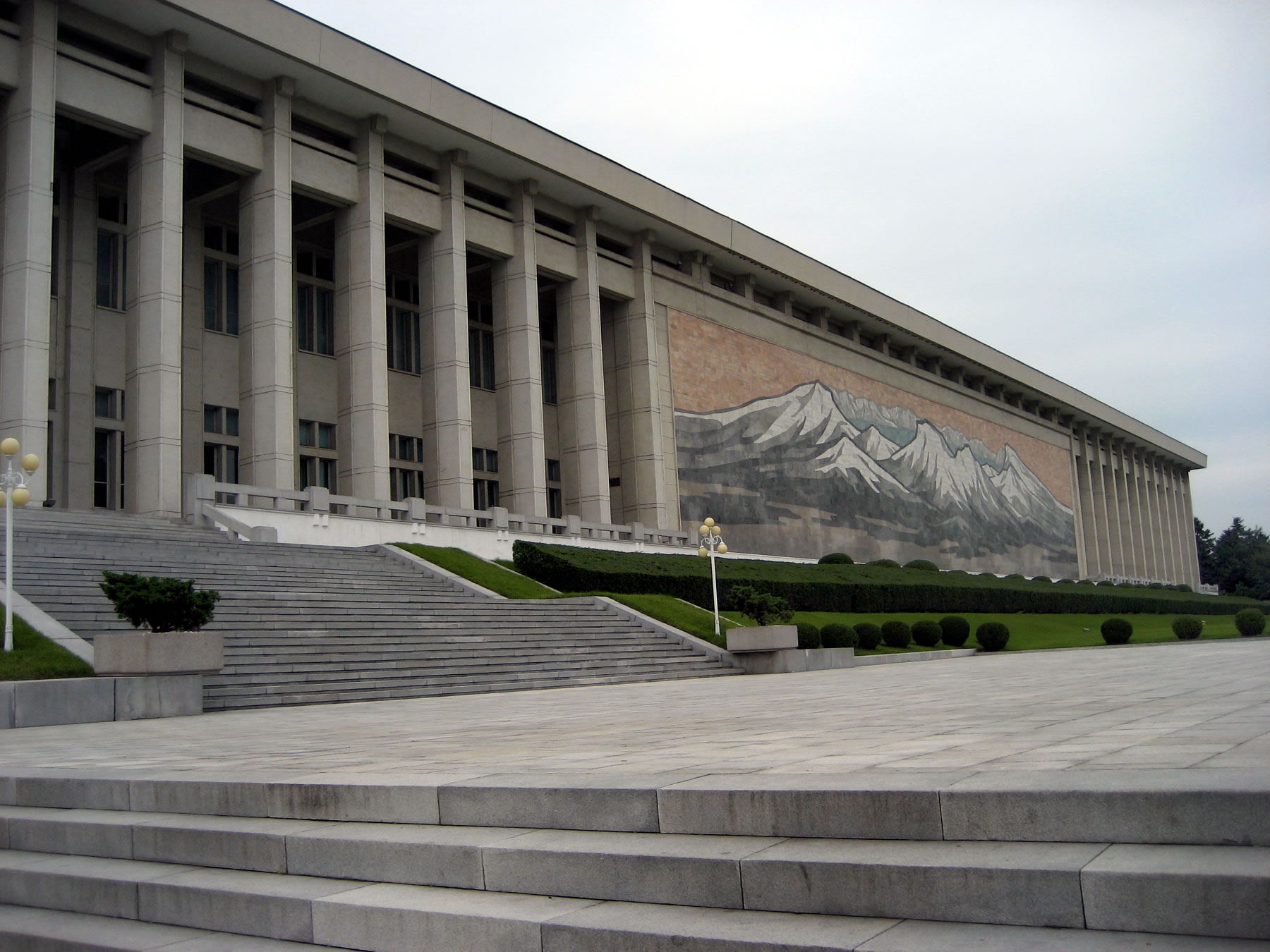
Korean Revolution Museum

Hwang Sun-hui was born on 3 May 1919 near the border between Japanese Korea and the Republic of China. Yonhap lists her place of birth as North Hamgyong Province, although some sources such as the KCNA and the South Korean Ministry of Unification list her as being born in Helong or Yanji, China. She served as a guerrilla in the 88th Special Independent Sniper Brigade of the Soviet Far East Command during the Second Sino-Japanese War and World War II. Her duties included sewing, cooking, and nursing. There she met Kim Il Sung and her future husband Ryu Kyong-su. Hwang returned to North Korea in November 1945. She would play a key political role in the nascent North Korean state.

Her first post of political significance was as the chairwoman of the provincial committee of the Korean Democratic Women's Union (KDWU) for Ryanggang Province in March 1956. She was made a member of the central executive committee of the whole KDWU in August 1969, the director of its central committee in October 1971, and the vice chairwoman of the organization in December 1977.

Hwang was made an alternate member in the Central Committee of the Workers' Party of Korea (WPK) in September 1961. She was elected full member in November 1969 and again in October 1980. In September 2010, she was again on the central committee, this time as an alternate member.

Hwang became affiliated with the Korean Revolution Museum in October 1965 when she became the chairwoman of its party committee. She was made secretary of the committee in June 1973 and again in July 1988. Hwang became the director of the museum in April 1990.

Hwang was a deputy to the 3rd, 4th, 5th, 7th, 8th, 9th, 10th, and 13th Supreme People's Assemblies. Hwang was on the funeral committees of Kim Il Sung (1994, ranked 6th), O Jin-u (1995), Choe Kwang (1997, 28th), and Jon Mun-sop (1998). Hwang was awarded the Order of Labor in May 1979, Order of Kim Il Sung in April 1982, and "Double Hero" in April 1992. She was awarded the Jubilee Medal "70 Years of Victory in the Great Patriotic War 1941–1945" on 6 May 2015 by Vladimir Putin.

== Public image ==
Hwang Sun-hui was married to Ryu Kyong-su. Ryu was a hero of the Korean War, leading a brigade of the 105th Armored Division into Seoul as the first armored unit. His unit hoisted the North Korean flag at Seoul City Hall. This association with her husband gave Hwang "unrivalled rank in the party". The two had a daughter, Ryu Chu-ok, who is married to Kim Chang-son, also a prominent WPK politician.

Hwang was one of very few women on the Central Committee of the WPK, and one of its oldest members. As a former guerrilla, her membership in the central committee was considered ceremonially important.

Hwang was considered one of the original supporters of the Kim dynasty. All three Kims appeared with her over the decades, making her a permanent living propaganda exhibit from the early days of the Kim regime until she died. The leader of North Korea hugging Hwang was a familiar sight in the country. Kim Jong Un was seen hugging her in his first year as the supreme leader, again in 2013, and in 2017 when he visited Hwang—who by this point in her life used a wheelchair—at the Korean Revolution Museum. One defector noted, "Hwang has been so squeezed that she must not have any juice left in her".

Hwang Sun-hui died at age 100 on 17 January 2020, and her bier was attended by Kim Jong Un and his wife. Following her death, the Korean Central News Agency described Hwang as "a steadfast female revolutionary who dedicated her all to the accomplishment of the revolutionary cause of Juche pioneered on Mount Paekdu". She was given a state funeral with the following members on her funeral committee chaired by Choe Ryong-hae:

1. Choe Ryong-hae
2. Pak Pong-ju
3. Kim Jae-ryong
4. Ri Man-gon
5. Ri Il-hwan
6. Choe Hwi
7. Ri Pyong-chol
8. Kim Tok-hun
9. Pak Thae-dok
10. Pak Thae-song
11. Kim Yong-chol
12. Choe Pu-il
13. Kim Su-kil
14. Thae Hyong-chol
15. O Su-yong
16. Jong Kyong-thaek
17. Kim Hyong-jun
18. Ho Chol-man
19. Ri Ho-rim
20. Cho Yong-won
21. Pak Jong-chon
22. Kim Jong-kwan
23. Im Chol-ung
24. Ri Ryong-nam
25. Kim Il-chol
26. Ri Chu-o
27. Tong Jong-ho
28. Chon Kwang-ho
29. Ko In-ho
30. Pak Yong-il
31. Pak Kyong-suk
32. Ri Yong-suk
33. Choe Tong-myong
34. Ri Yong-rae
35. Ro Kwang-sop
36. Kim Jun-son
37. O Il-jong
38. Ri Sang-won
39. Kim Ki-nam
40. Ri Yong-sik
41. Kim Cho-kuk
42. Kim Nung-o
43. Pak Jong-nam
44. Ri Hi-yong
45. Kim Tu-il
46. Mun Kyong-dok
47. Ri Chol-man
48. Pak Chang-ho
49. Kang Pong-hun
50. Kim Song-il
51. Kim Yong-hwan
52. Kim Chol-sam
53. Sin Yong-chol
54. Ri Thae-il
55. Jong Yong-kuk
56. Son Yong-hun
57. Pak Chol-min
58. Chu Yong-kil
59. Kim Chang-yop
60. Chang Chun-sil
61. So Hong-chan
62. Son Chol-chu
63. Cho Kyong-chol
64. Ri Tu-song
65. Kim Song-chol
66. Kang Sun-nam
67. Ri Tong-chun
68. Ri Yong-ju
69. O Kum-chol

== Awards and honors ==
A frame displaying Hwang's decorations was placed at the foot of her bier during her funeral.

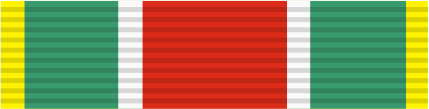

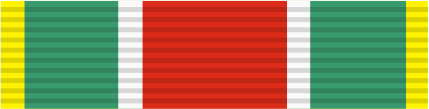
