= 2019 North Korean parliamentary election =

- 10 March 2019

All 687 seats in the Supreme People's Assembly 344 seats needed for a majority
- Turnout: 99.99% (▲0.02 pp)
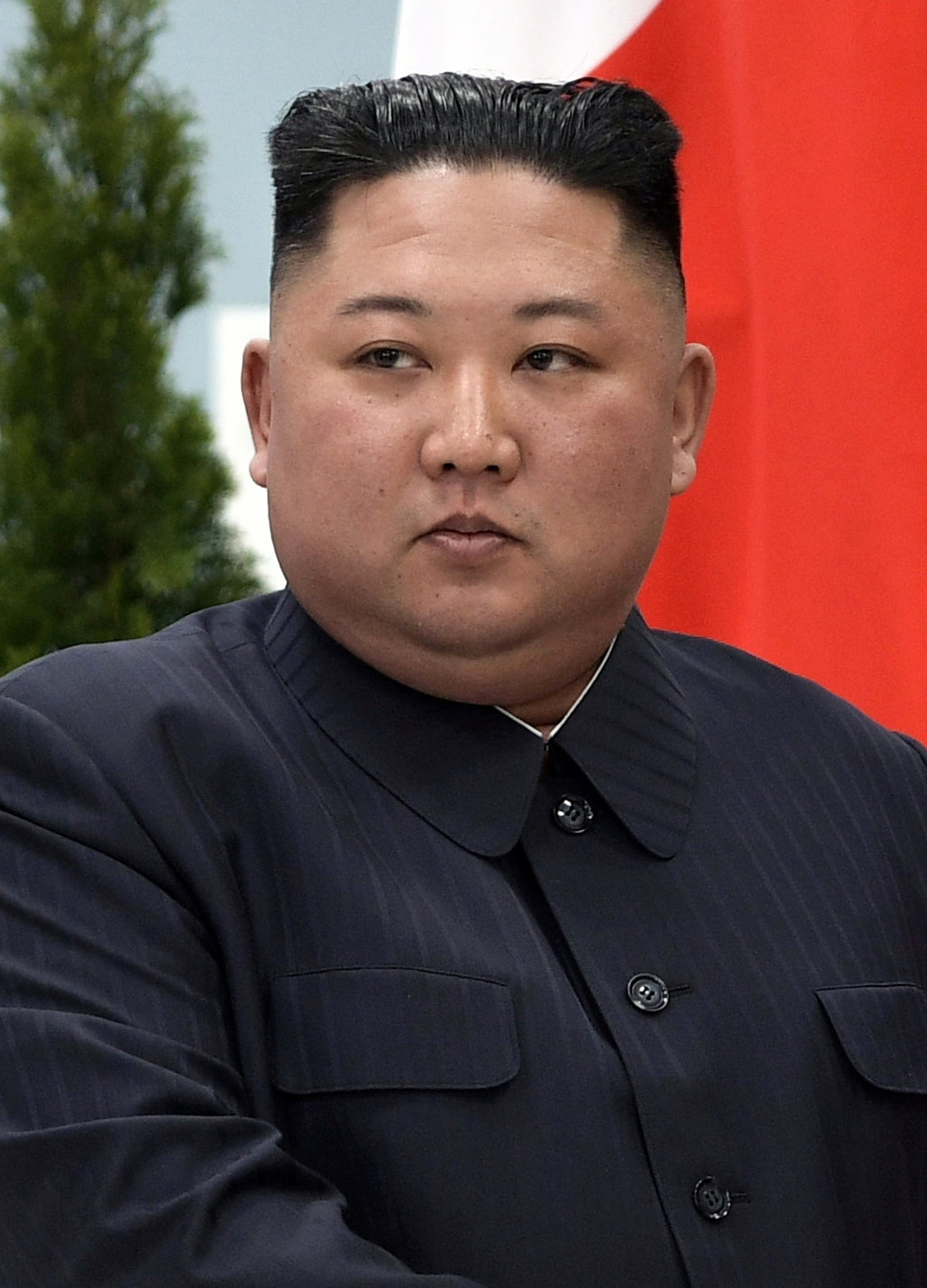
	First party
Leader	Kim Jong Un
Party	Workers' Party
Alliance	Fatherland Front
Leader since	11 April 2012
Leader's seat	Did not stand
Last election	687
Seats won	687
Seat change	Steady
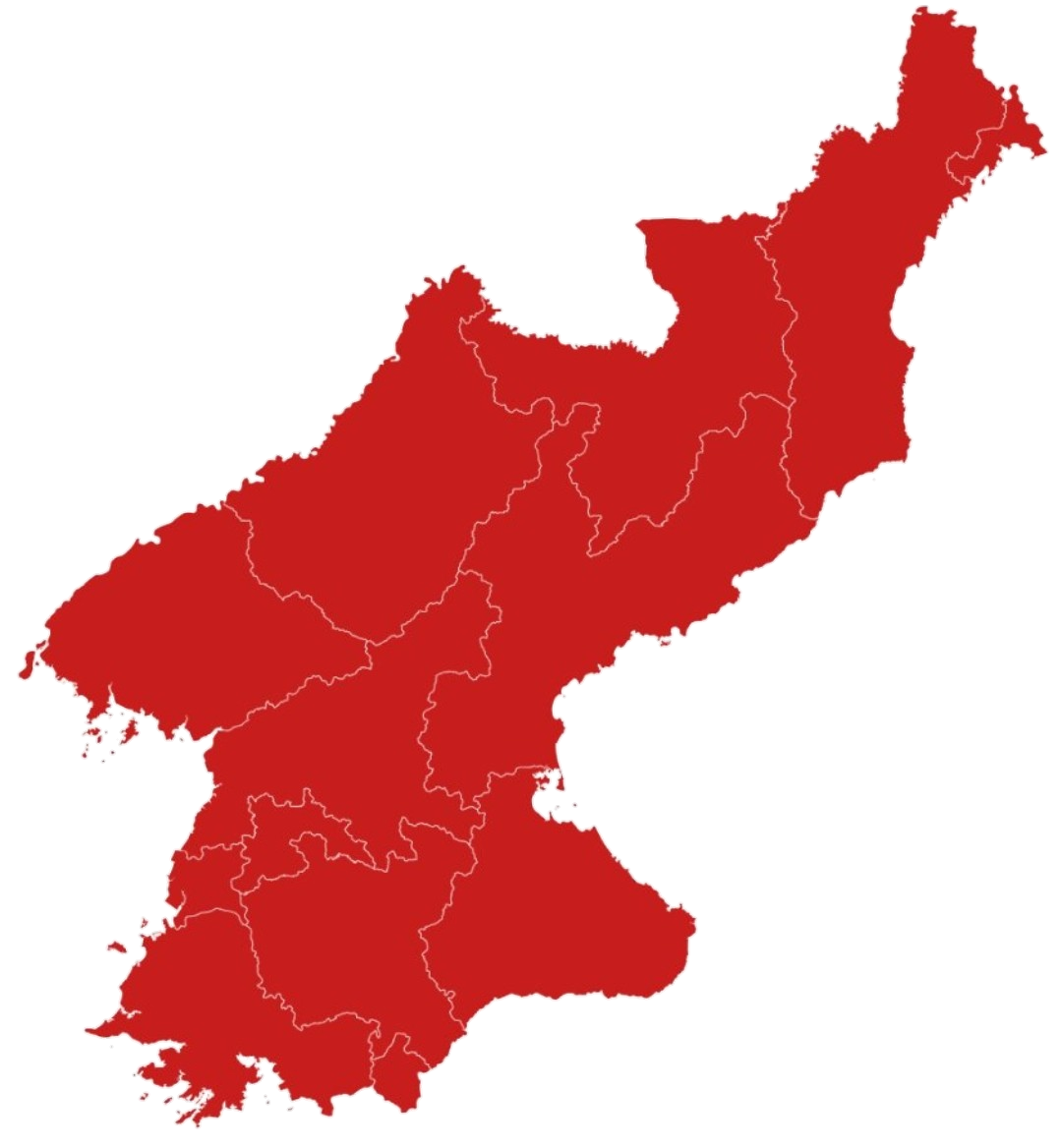
- Results by province
SAC Chairman before election
Kim Jong Un
Workers' Party
Elected SAC Chairman
Kim Jong Un
Workers' Party

Parliamentary elections were held in North Korea on 10 March 2019 to elect the members of the 14th Supreme People's Assembly. The elections were announced on 6 January 2019. With only one candidate on the ballot in each constituency, outside observers described it as a show election. 687 candidates for the DPRK deputies to the SPA were elected. Kim Jong Un did not stand for election, marking the first time that a North Korean leader did not participate as a candidate.

== Background ==
On 8 January 2019 the Presidium of the Supreme People's Assembly (SPA) issued Decision No. 220, which announced the election of deputies to the 14th Supreme People's Assembly. This was followed three days later by the Presidium of the Supreme People's Assembly issuing Decision No. 221, which organized a central election committee for the election of the 14th Supreme People's Assembly that consists of Yang Hyong-sop as chairman, Kim Phyong-hae as vice chairman, Jong Yong-guk as secretary general, as well as Choe Pu-il, Kim Yong-dae, Kim Yong-ho, Pak Chol-min, Ju Yong-gil, Kim Chang-yop, Jang Chun-sil, Ri Tu-song, Pak Myong-chol and Ryo Jong-son as members.

The Korean Central News Agency (KCNA) reported on 29 January that the constituencies and sub-constituencies for the election of the 14th Supreme People's Assembly had been organized, and, on 3 February, reported that election committees had been organized in the constituencies and sub-constituencies. On 21 February, the Workers' Party of Korea Publishing House produced posters urging voters to "further glorify socialism of our style on the strength of single-minded unity" and to "cement our revolutionary power as firm as a rock." On 24 February, the KCNA reported that sub-constituency committees have displayed lists of eligible voters for the election. On 25 February, the Rodong Sinmun published an editorial calling for elevated political enthusiasm and participation in the elections. The Central Committee of the Democratic Front for the Reunification of the Fatherland issued a similar appeal and sought for the social and economic prosperity of the nation coupled with peaceful relations (and a reunification) with South Korea. On 2 March, the Korean Central Television broadcast similar slogans.

On 4 March the Rodong Sinmun published a commentary saying that the North Korean election system is "the most superior in the world."

On 7 March the Central Election Committee reported that the nomination and registration of candidates has been completed. On 8 March, the KCNA reported that profiles of candidates in the election have been displayed at all constituencies, and polling stations have been set up.

== Electoral system ==
The election was based on the principle of a single-seat, first-past-the-post system. The candidate with most votes won the seat, even if they won less than half of total valid votes (majority voting). According to outside observers, the proceedings were a show election. It was also believed that the legislature wielded no influence on state policies and served as a rubber-stamp to decisions taken by the party machinery.

Voting was mandatory, and choice of candidates was not offered. The voters were given a ballot paper with a single name and were expected to drop it in the ballot box. Voters are theoretically able to signify dissent by crossing the name off, or by not voting at all. However, some observers have reported that voting in this manner can be interpreted as treasonous.

== Conduct ==
At 11:00 Kim Jong Un went to Sub-constituency No. 40 of Constituency No. 10 Kyogu located at the Kim Chaek University of Technology, and voted for the university's president Hong So-hon as deputy to the Supreme People's Assembly.

At 12:00 the Central Election Committee reported that the voter turnout had reached 56.76 percent; turnout had reached 92.35% by 15:00.

At 18:00 the Central Election Committee reported that all of the voters except for those overseas or working at sea had participated in the election, and that the election results were being counted.

== Results ==
The Central Election Committee reported on 12 March 2019 that the voter turnout for the election was at 99.99%, and that unanimously the voters cast their ballots in favor of the registered candidates. The report also included the names of the 687 elected deputies to the 14th Supreme People's Assembly.

Kim Jong Un was not included in the list of elected deputies, which marked the first time that a North Korean leader did not participate as a candidate in the election of the Supreme People's Assembly.

Party or alliance		Votes	%	Seats
Fatherland Front	Workers' Party of Korea		100	682
Fatherland Front	Korean Social Democratic Party		100	682
Fatherland Front	Chondoist Chongu Party		100	682
Fatherland Front	Independents		100	682
Fatherland Front	Chongryon		100	5
Total				687
Registered voters/turnout			99.99	
Source: Choson Sinbo, NK News

=== Elected members ===
The following individuals were elected as members of parliament; half were newly-elected:

No.	Constituency	Elected deputy
1	Mangyongdae	Han Song-guk
2	Kwangbok	Yun Yong-chol
3	Phalgol	Pak Kum-hui
4	Janghun	Kim Yun-sil
5	Kallimgil	Kim Yo Jong
6	Chukjon	Kim Song-bong
7	Taephyong	Kim Yong Bok
8	Wollo	Kim Tong-suk
9	Kyongsang	Ri Sung-jun
10	Kyogu	Hong So-hon
11	Ryonhwa	Sim Kyong-ok
12	Sochang	Kil Kum-sun
13	Phyongchon	Kim Myong-hwan
14	Ansan	Kim Sok-nam
15	Ponghak	Kim Hyon
16	Ryukgyo	Ri Yong-hui
17	Saemaul	Jo Kil-nyo
18	Pothonggang	Pang Sung-son
19	Ryugyong	Kim Hye-ran
20	Pulgungori	Ri Mi-ok
21	Kaeson	Choe Hui-thae
22	Pipha	Hwang Sun-hui
23	Jonsung	Choe Ryong-hae
24	Kinmaul	Ri Sung-ho
25	Sosong	Ri Su-yong
26	Janggyong	Hong Song-gwang
27	Hasin	O Yong-jae
28	Jungsin	Pak In-suk
29	Taesong	Thae Hyong-chol
30	Ryonghung	Yang Hyong-sop
31	Anhak	Jong Myong-il
32	Ulmil	Jo Kum-ju
33	Kwahak	Jang Chol
34	Tongmun	Kim Song-hui
35	Chongryu	Ri Song-uk
36	Munsu	Ri Myong-chol
37	Tapje	Choe Song-ran
38	Sagok	Kim Yong-bae
39	Tongdaewon	Cha Hui-rim
40	Ryuldong	Choe Song-won
41	Silli	Sim Il-chol
42	Samma	Ri Man-gon
43	Songyo	Rim Tong-hun
44	Tungme	Ri Kun-il
45	Ryulgok	Jo Myong-nam
46	Yongje	Han Myong-hui
47	Rangnang	Kim Yong-nam
48	Jongo	Kim Ki-nam
49	Jongbaek	Pak Hyong-ryol
50	Chungsong	Ri Un-jong
51	Kwanmun	Jo Ju-yong
52	Sungri	Ri Pyong-chol
53	Wonam	Ko Song-dok
54	Ryongsong	Ham Chol-nam
55	Rimwon	Kim Kwang-uk
56	Ryonggung	An Myong-gon
57	Unha	Ri Yong-suk
58	Oun	Kang Sun-chol
59	Masan	Kim Hae-song
60	Sunan	Rim Kwang-ung
61	Sokbak	Jon Sung-nam
62	Sadong	Jo Hyong-chol
63	Turu	Choe Chol-jung
64	Hyuam	Ryom Tok-jun
65	Rihyon	Pak Hyok
66	Ryokpho	Jong Yong-suk
67	Nunggum	Yun Kye-su
68	Hyongjesan	Ri Yong-chol
69	Hadang	Paek Sok-sun
70	Sangdang	Kim Jong-suk
71	Sinmi	Rim Won-jun
72	Samsok	Kim Nung-o
73	Todok	Jon Ha-rim
74	Kangnam	Ri Man-song
75	Yongjin	Ri Won-ok
76	Kangdong	Jo Jun-mo
77	Ponghwa	Kim Jae-ok
78	Samdung	Kim Jong-chol
79	Sangri	Kang Phyo-yong
80	Hukryong	Kim Phyo-hun
81	Songsok	Hwang Kang-chol
82	Panghyon	Hong Pyong-chol
83	Phyongsong	Chae Myong-hak
84	Undok	An Myong-ok
85	Ori	Kim Yong-su
86	Samhwa	Kim Sung-du
87	Kuwol	Min Sang-gi
88	Okjon	Choe Chang-gi
89	Paeksong	Ri Ryong-nam
90	Anju	Ri Chang-gun
91	Sinanju	Ri Kye-bong
92	Tongmyon	Ri Kun-ho
93	Wonphung	Choe Ji-son
94	Nampyong	Yun Jong-guk
95	Namhung	O Su-yong
96	Kaechon	Kim Kum-suk
97	Ramjon	Yun Yong-nam
98	Sambong	Jang Jong-nam
99	Konji	Kim Sun-hwa
100	Kangchol	Kim Chang-gon
101	Ryungjin	Kim Tok-hun
102	Kakam	Jang Kyong-chol
103	Alil	Rim Tong-chol
104	Ryongun	Ri Il-hwan
105	Sunchon	O Yong-gon
106	Saedok	Kim Tu-il
107	Soksu	Choe Yong-il
108	Ryonpho	Sim Tong-chol
109	Jeyak	Ryu Tu-hyon
110	Subok	Pak Pong-ju
111	Jikdong	Song Chang-ho
112	Ryongak	Choe Kwang-il
113	Tokchon	Choe Jang-il
114	Kongwon	Im Chol-ung
115	Jenam	Ri Yong-chol
116	Chongsong	Mun Myong-hak
117	Sangdok	Yu Rim-ho
118	Jangsang	Kim Yong-dae
119	Taedong	Ko Ki-chol
120	Sijong	Ri Myong-hak
121	Yongok	Yun Jong-sil
122	Jungsan	Kim Song-il
123	Kwangje	Sin O-sun
124	Phungjong	Han Chol
125	Phyongwon	Kim Jun-son
126	Wonhwa	So Kyong-sim
127	Opha	Ma Won-chun
128	Unbong	Pak Thae-song
129	Hanchon	Yu Chol-u
130	Sukchon	Ri Yong-chol
131	Ryongdok	Ri Song-chol
132	Yoldusamchon	Kim Jae-nam
133	Namyang	Kim Man-song
134	Komsan	Choe Yong-song
135	Mundok	Kang Hyong-bong
136	Ripsok	Rim Tok-hwa
137	Ryongo	Kim Song-hui
138	Songchon	Jang Sun-kum
139	Kunja	Jon Kwang-ho
140	Sinsongchon	Ryu Won-song
141	Jangrim	Kim Ki-gun
142	Sinyang	Choe Yong-hui
143	Yangdok	Kang Chu-ryon
144	Tongyang	Kim Ok-ryon
145	Unsan	O Yong-chol
146	Chonsong	Jong Yong-nam
147	Kubong	Ju Yong-gil
148	Jaedong	Kim Ung-sop
149	Haksan	Sin Ung-sik
150	Mangil	Ri Myong-hui
151	Pukchang	Kim Yong-chol
152	Songnam	Mun Sun-hui
153	Okchon	Kim Kwang-su
154	Inpho	U Won-yong
155	Tukjang	Jon Hak-chol
156	Maengsan	Jo Won-thaek
157	Nyongwon	Pak Tong-chol
158	Taehung	Wang Chang-uk
159	Hoechang	Son Sok-gun
160	Sinjak	Jang Se-hyon
161	Chongnam	Pak Yong-jin
162	Komunkum	Kim Hyong-il
163	Ungok	Kim Tong-il
164	Thaebaeksan	Ri Kwon
165	Otaesan	Kim Kwang-hyok
166	Unphasan	Jang Yong-su
167	Cholbongsan	Jong Se-yon
168	Myolaksan	Kim Yong-jin
169	Jangamsan	Kim Myong-ho
170	Pongsusan	Yun Tong-hyon
171	Taedoksan	Kim Jong-gwan
172	Namchongang	Hwang Kun-il
173	Jangjagang	Kim Myong-sik
174	Sinphagang	Jin Chol-su
175	Taesongsan	So Hong-chan
176	Mannyonsan	Yun Pyong-gwon
177	Kuwolsan	Kim Song-chol
178	Hallasan	No Kwang-chol
179	Chonmasan	Kim Hyong-ryong
180	Samgaksan	Son Chol-ju
181	Sungrisan	Jo Kyong-chol
182	Osongsan	Kim Thaek-gu
183	Roktusan	Pak Su-il
184	Unbaeksan	Pang Kwan-bok
185	Pongsungsan	Ho Yong-chun
186	Paekmasan	Ri Tu-song
187	Songaksan	Ri Tong-chun
188	Suyangsan	Ri Yong-ju
189	Sindoksan	An Ji-yong
190	Myongdangsan	Kim Sok-hong
191	Pongaksan	Choe Tu-yong
192	Taemyongsan	Pak Myong-su
193	Ryongaksan	Ri Thae-sop
194	Songchongang	Ri Pong-chun
195	Phyongchongang	Ju Song-nam
196	Sujonggang	Kim Kum-chol
197	Chailgang	Kim Sang-ryong
198	Samchongang	Pak Jong-chon
199	Somjingang	Song Sok-won
200	Yongchongang	Kim Myong-nam
201	Okchongang	Kim Su-gil
202	Ryesonggang	Kim Kwang-su
203	Wigumgang	Ri Mun-guk
204	Kalmagang	Song Yong-gon
205	Haegumgang	Ko Myong-su
206	Piphagang	Ri Jong-nam
207	Kumchongang	Ri Yong-gil
208	Taedonggang	Kang Sun-nam
209	Chongchongang	Hong Jong-duk
210	Amnokgang	Ri Kwang-ho
211	Tumangang	Ri Yong-chol
212	Kunmasan	Hong Chol-gun
213	Naegumgang	Chon Jae-gwon
214	Hyoksin	Ju Tong-chol
215	Hwaebul	Kim Kwang-hyok
216	Sobaeksu	Ri Myong-su
217	Kumsu	Kwak Chang-sik
218	Haebal	Jo Thae-san
219	Moranbong	Kim Yong-ho
220	Haebang	Jang Il-su
221	Pyoldong	Choe Pu-il
222	Jonjin	Kang Phil-hun
223	Jasonggang	Ri Yong-hwan
224	Ponghwasan	Jon Tae-nam
225	Kumgangsan	Ro Kyong-jun
226	Sinuiju	So Ran-hui
227	Paeksa	Ri Jong-ryol
228	Namjung	Jong Yong-guk
229	Minpho	Kim Man-su
230	Sumun	Sin Ryong-man
231	Chinson	O Jong-hui
232	Ryusang	Kim Hae-yong
233	Wai	Kang Ryong-mo
234	Sokha	Pak Hui-min
235	Rakchong	Pak Jong-gun
236	Yonha	Kim Hwa-song
237	Kusong	So Chun-yong
238	Paeksok	Kim Jong-chol
239	Namchang	Yang Sung-ho
240	Chahung	Ho Chol-yong
241	Jongju	Kim Kwang-un
242	Tokon	Paek Jong-ran
243	Koan	Ri Yong-jun
244	Namho	Kim Kyong-ae
245	Kalsan	Sonu Hui-chol
246	Sakju	Kim Kwang-song
247	Phungnyon	Kim Myong-ok
248	Suphung	Kang Won-sik
249	Chongsong	Ri Chang-sok
250	Phihyon	Hwang Jun-thaek
251	Ryangchaek	Kim Chol
252	Paekma	Kim Yong-son
253	Ryongchon	Kim Se-wan
254	Pukjung	Hong Kwang-hyok
255	Ryongampho	Choe Chan-il
256	Sinam	Kim Yong-sun
257	Yomju	Kim Pyong-ho
258	Tasa	Choe Yong-dok
259	Woeha	Paek On
260	Cholsan	Jang Chang-ha
261	Kasan	Kim Yong-gil
262	Tongrim	Kye Myong-chol
263	Chonggang	Ri Chung-gil
264	Singok	Kim Chol-ho
265	Sonchon	Paek In-chol
266	Wolchon	Kwon Song-ho
267	Samsong	Jo Jong-mun
268	Inam	Ho Kwang-chun
269	Kwaksan	Kim Il-guk
270	Wonha	Cha Sung-su
271	Chojang	Pak Thae-sik
272	Unjon	Choe Kwang-chol
273	Taeo	Kim Song-nam
274	Posok	Choe Myong-sil
275	Pakchon	Ryu Jong-guk
276	Toksam	Ho Kwang-il
277	Maengjung	Pak Yong-sun
278	Nyongbyon	Kim Kum-sil
279	Phalwon	Ri Ju-o
280	Kujang	Mun Kyong-dok
281	Ryongdung	Kim Yong-song
282	Ryongmun	Ju Yong-sik
283	Sugu	Choe Yong
284	Hyangsan	Kim Kyong-hui
285	Thaephyong	Choe Hyok-chol
286	Unsan	Jong Kyong-il
287	Phungyang	Ri Chol-jin
288	Joyang	Han Chang-ho
289	Thaechon	O Hye-son
290	Unhung	Ho Jong-ok
291	Hakbong	Kim Kyong-nam
292	Chonma	Kim Yong-gyu
293	Joak	Kim Kun-chol
294	Uiju	Han Tong-song
295	Unchon	Hong Yong-chil
296	Tokryong	Mo Sung-gil
297	Taegwan	Choe Yong-song
298	Taeryong	Jo Yong-su
299	Changsong	Choe Hak-chol
300	Tongchang	Paek Myong-chol
301	Pyokdong	Paek Sun-yong
302	Sindo	Ri Yong-chol
303	Yaksan	Choe Song-il
304	Haechong	So Sung-chol
305	Uppha	Kim Tong-son
306	Okgye	Kim Yong-chol
307	Soae	Kang Ji-yong
308	Sokchon	Pak Myong-chol
309	Hakhyon	U Chang-sik
310	Pyoksong	An Hye-song
311	Jukchon	Pak Pong-dok
312	Kangryong	Jang Yong-su
313	Pupho	Yo Man-hyon
314	Kumdong	Choe Sun-chol
315	Ongjin	Ri Myong-chol
316	Sagot	Paek Kyong-sin
317	Samsan	Kim Mok-ryong
318	Jonsan	Kim Jang-san
319	Thaetan	An Kyong-hwa
320	Kwasan	Hong Pong-chol
321	Jangyon	Mun In-chol
322	Rakyon	Ri Yong-chol
323	Samchon	Ri Ik-jung
324	Talchon	Kim Jong
325	Songhwa	Kim Son-hui
326	Unryul	Kim Ung-chol
327	Kumsanpho	Kang Kil-yong
328	Jangryon	Ri Hwa-gyong
329	Unchon	Kil Kyong-hui
330	Ryangdam	Kim Ik-song
331	Anak	Ko In-ho
332	Wolji	Kim Chang-yop
333	Taechu	Choe Yong-sam
334	Omgot	Ri Jae-sik
335	Sinchon	Kim Chang-nam
336	Saenal	Mun Ung-jo
337	Saegil	Pak Yong-ho
338	Panjong	Kwon Jong-sil
339	Jaeryong	Choe Hwi
340	Samjigang	Ri Hye-suk
341	Jangguk	Kim Yong-ae
342	Pukji	Kim Tae-song
343	Sinwon	So Pyong-hwan
344	Muhak	Song Won-gil
345	Pongchon	Kim Chun-do
346	Sindap	Kang Jong-hui
347	Paechon	Won Kyong-mo
348	Kumsong	Kim Thae-sik
349	Jongchon	Kim Jin-guk
350	Unbong	Ri Chol-man
351	Kumgok	Kang Myong-chol
352	Yonan	Pak Thae-dok
353	Ohyon	Jin Yon-sil
354	Songho	Hong Myong-gi
355	Chonthae	Choe Tong-yun
356	Haewol	Kim Myong-chol
357	Chongdan	Yang Yong-gil
358	Namchon	Choe Sung-ho
359	Tokdal	Ri Hong-sop
360	Chongjong	Pak Yon-ok
361	Ryongyon	Kim Jong-ho
362	Kumi	Ri Jong-suk
363	Kwail	O In-nam
364	Sindae	Jong Su-hyok
365	Sariwon	O Myong-chun
366	Wonju	Chae Kang-hwan
367	Migok	Song Yun-hui
368	Songyong	Kang Yun-sok
369	Kwangsong	Ri Son-gwon
370	Jongbang	Ri Yong-rae
371	Unha	Ri Yong-ho
372	Kuchon	Ri Yong-sim
373	Kaesong	Paek Chun-gi
374	Tonghyon	Jong Kyong-thaek
375	Sonjuk	Choe Pyong-ryol
376	Unhak	Pang Kang-su
377	Tokam	Ri Kum-chol
378	Phanmun	Kim Yong-chol
379	Ryongsan	Ri Kil-song
380	Kaephung	An Yong-hwan
381	Hwangju	Ri Hye-jong
382	Chongryong	Ro Kwang-sop
383	Samjong	Kim Chol-guk
384	Hukgyo	Han Chol-nam
385	Yonthan	Ri Hang-gol
386	Misan	Ri Yong-sik
387	Pongsan	Ryang Jong-hun
388	Madong	Kim Jae-chol
389	Chonggye	Kim Chang-gwang
390	Kuyon	Jo Chol-song
391	Unpha	Ko Kil-son
392	Kangan	Kim Tae-song
393	Kwangmyong	Cha Jae-hui
394	Rinsan	Ko Jong-chol
395	Taechon	Kim Jong-ok
396	Sohung	Han I-chol
397	Poman	O Myong-song
398	Suan	Kwon Thae-yong
399	Namjong	Pak Kum-song
400	Yonsan	Kim Tu-chol
401	Holdong	Kim Jae-song
402	Sinphyong	An Tong-chun
403	Mannyon	Ri Yong-jin
404	Koksan	Ryu Myong-gum
405	Phyongam	Pak Myong-son
406	Singye	Nam Yong-suk
407	Jongbong	Ju Tong-chol
408	Chuchon	Choe Sin-uk
409	Phyongsan	Ki Kwang-ho
410	Chongsu	Ri Myong-hui
411	Namchon	Kim Jong-chol
412	Kumchon	Kim Wan-su
413	Hyonnae	Pak Hye-suk
414	Sokthap	Ho Pong-il
415	Songrim	Ri Jong-chol
416	Tangsan	Ho Ryong
417	Thosan	Kim Jong-ok
418	Yangsa	Jang Ki-ho
419	Jangphung	Jo Yong-chol
420	Kuhwa	Kim Kyong-sim
421	Sangwon	Jo Yon-jun
422	Myongdang	Yun Jae-hyok
423	Junghwa	Han Ung-su
424	Chaesong	Ri Jong-hyok
425	Sungho	Ri Kum-ok
426	Mandal	Im Hun
427	Kanggye	Ro Tu-chol
428	Yonju	An Yong-nam
429	Puchang	Jang Hyok
430	Yahak	Choe Chang-son
431	Sokhyon	Kim Hye-ran
432	Woeryong	Jong Kwang-chol
433	Naeryong	Han Yong-ho
434	Manpho	Kim Myong-hun
435	Kuo	Chae Jong-sok
436	Munak	Kim Chon-ho
437	Huichon	Kim Jae-ryong
438	Solmoru	Pak Chol-hun
439	Chuphyong	Ham Nam-hyok
440	Chongnyon	Thae Jong-su
441	Jonphyong	Ri Yong-hon
442	Songgan	Ri Sung-kum
443	Songryong	Sin Kwan-jin
444	Jonchon	Ri Su-ryon
445	Hakmu	Kim Yong-il
446	Unsong	Hong Sung-mu
447	Ryongrim	So Kyong-ho
448	Tongsin	Pak Chun-gon
449	Songwon	Kim Chon-gyun
450	Janggang	Pak Yong-bok
451	Hyangha	Ko Pyong-hyon
452	Rangrim	Ri Hyong-gun
453	Hwaphyong	So Kyong-chol
454	Jasong	Kim Kwang-ju
455	Junggang	Kim Tuk-mong
456	Sijung	Jang Il-ryong
457	Wiwon	Kim Chang-gol
458	Ryanggang	Song Jong-hak
459	Chosan	Ri Sung-nyo
460	Kophung	Ri Chol-ho
461	Usi	Jang Kum-hui
462	Segil	Rim Sun-hui
463	Kwanphung	Pyon Ung-gyu
464	Jangdok	Choe Kwang-il
465	Pongchun	Jang Sung-ho
466	Myongsok	Yu Kyong-ho
467	Wonnam	Paae Yong-sun
468	Phoha	An Jong-su
469	Pokmak	Ri Yong-sik
470	Kalma	Han Sang-jun
471	Munchon	Won Nam-chol
472	Munphyong	Ri Chol-ho
473	Okphyong	Kim Jong-sim
474	Chonnae	Om Yong-hak
475	Hwara	Pak Kwang-song
476	Anbyon	Pak Jong-nam
477	Paehwa	U Jong-suk
478	Kosan	Han Yong-chol
479	Puphyong	Ham Jong-chol
480	Solbong	Son Kum-wol
481	Thongchon	Jo Song-chol
482	Songjon	Pak Chol-min
483	Kosong	Jon Chang-guk
484	Onjong	Choe Son-hui
485	Kumgang	So Kwang-ok
486	Soksa	Kye Hun-nyo
487	Changdo	Hwang Man-bok
488	Kimhwa	Ri Tu-il
489	Songsan	Mun Yong-chol
490	Hoeyang	Kim Kuk-chang
491	Sepho	Ri Ik
492	Huphyong	Hwang Min
493	Phyonggang	An Yong-sik
494	Pokgye	Nam Sung-u
495	Cholwon	Sin Chol-hui
496	Naemun	Pak Jong-ho
497	Ichon	Ryu Jong-chol
498	Phangyo	Paek Jong-sun
499	Popdong	Kim Kum-yong
500	Somun	Yu Kyong-hak
501	Samil	Ri Thae-jin
502	Sangsinhung	Yun Chol-ho
503	Tonghungsan	Mun Yong-son
504	Sosang	Kim Myong-gil
505	Phungho	Mun Sang-gwon
506	Hoesang	Ho Song-chol
507	Segori	Han Song-il
508	Jongsong	Yu Kyong-suk
509	Toksan	Kim Sung-jin
510	Sapho	Kim Sung-gi
511	Saegori	Pak Song-il
512	Choun	Kang Son
513	Hungdok	Ri Kuk-chol
514	Hungso	Kim Kwang-sik
515	Haean	Jang Song-chol
516	Unjung	Ri Kyong-il
517	Chongi	Ri Chang-ryong
518	Ryujong	Kim Chol-ha
519	Soho	Kim Chol-yong
520	Sinpho	Ri Yu-chol
521	Phungo	Kang Chol-gu
522	Ohang	Kim Song-il
523	Yanghwa	Song Chun-sop
524	Tanchon	Kim Sang-song
525	Ssangryong	Jon Hye-song
526	Sindanchon	Ho Thae-chol
527	Omong	Kang Jong-gwan
528	Ryongdae	Ri Jong-mu
529	Kwangchon	Kim Chol-su
530	Paekgumsan	Jang Chun-gun
531	Kumgol	Choe Chol
532	Puktu	Hwang Yong-sam
533	Sudong	Kim Jong-dok
534	Ryongphyong	Kim Jong-sok
535	Jangdong	Ryom Chol-su
536	Kowon	Kim Kwang-sok
537	Puraesan	Kim Hyon-jin
538	Yodok	Ri Jong-hwa
539	Kumya	Ju Hwa-suk
540	Inhung	Yun Yong-il
541	Kajin	Choe Jong-ho
542	Kwangmyongsong	Kim Pong-yong
543	Jungnam	Sok Won-chun
544	Jongpyong	Nam Yong-hwal
545	Sondok	Pak Chun-nam
546	Sinsang	Jon Song-guk
547	Chowon	Ri Myong-chol
548	Toksan	Ri Sung-nyon
549	Jangjin	Pak Chung-u
550	Yangji	Pang Chang-dok
551	Pujon	Kang Song-hui
552	Sinhung	Kim Sok-sun
553	Sangwonchon	Jon Il
554	Puhung	Han Ju-song
555	Yonggwang	Ri Wan-ho
556	Sujon	Pak Jong-hyon
557	Kisang	Han Ryong-guk
558	Hamju	Choe Il-ryong
559	Kusang	Kim Song-bong
560	Tongbong	Ri Yong-ae
561	Sangjung	Kang Su-rin
562	Sojung	Kim Tong-chun
563	Samho	Pak Hun
564	Hongwon	Choe Pok-sun
565	Sanyang	Han Chang-sun
566	Unpho	Ju Jong-gyong
567	Toksong	Kang Jong-ho
568	Janghung	Jong Kyong-hwa
569	Pukchong	Ko Thae-ryong
570	Sinchang	Kim Kyong-ho
571	Sinbukchong	Kim Song-gu
572	Chonghung	Han Myong-hui
573	Riwon	Kang Jong-sil
574	Rahung	Kim Yong-gyu
575	Chaejong	Kim Kyong-jun
576	Hochon	Tong Jong-ho
577	Sinhong	Ri Kang-son
578	Sangnong	Choe In-ho
579	Kumho	Ri Dam
580	Ranam	Thae Jin-hyok
581	Rabuk	Pyon Sung-gun
582	Namchongjin	Kim Song
583	Buyun	Ryang Yong-ho
584	Songpyong	Kim Kwang-nam
585	Sabong	Choe Ju-chol
586	Kangdok	Tong Hun
587	Susong	Choe Yong-ho
588	Sunam	Kim Song-won
589	Malum	Hong Kil-ho
590	Phohang	Kim Hyon-myong
591	Subuk	Kim Chol-ho
592	Namhyang	Kim Ki-song
593	Sinjin	Ri Chol
594	Kyodong	Kim Chang-gil
595	Chongam	Ri Yong-son
596	Ryonjin	Kang Yong-ju
597	Kwanhae	Kang Yong-su
598	Hoeryong	Ko Ju-gwang
599	Osandok	Ri Sun-sil
600	Mangyang	Ri Kwi-ok
601	Yuson	Ri Hye-sun
602	Songam	Jon Song-man
603	Chonghak	Ho Thae-ryul
604	Jegang	Ri Song-jae
605	Jangpyong	Choe Il
606	Haksong	Choe Un-sil
607	Kilju	Rim Chun-hui
608	Ilsin	Kim Il
609	Junam	Yun Kang-ho
610	Yongbuk	Choe Kwi-nam
611	Hwadae	Jo Kum-hui
612	Ryongpho	Kim Hyong-jun
613	Myongchon	Ryang Won-jin
614	Ryongam	U Ung-ho
615	Myonggan	Choe Yong-suk
616	Yongban	Kim Yong-ho
617	Kukdong	Ho Jong-man
618	Orang	Choe Yong-suk
619	Odaejin	Ri Yong-chol
620	Kyongsong	Pak Kun-sok
621	Hamyon	Jang Chun-sil
622	Sungam	Nam Hong-son
623	Puryong	Pak In-su
624	Musan	Myong Song-chol
625	Soedol	Phyo Il-sok
626	Sangchang	Kim Chung-gol
627	Yonsa	Ro Song-ung
628	Onsong	Ri Hi-yong
629	Wangjaesan	Kim Ok-ryon
630	Jongsong	Kim Kwang-chol
631	Kyongwon	Sin Chol-ung
632	Kogonwon	Jon Han-gil
633	Ryongbuk	Ji Jae-ryong
634	Kyonghung	O Kyong-sok
635	Haksong	Kim Yong-sil
636	Obong	Jang Kil-ryong
637	Hyesan	Pak Chol-ho
638	Hyejang	Jong Hyong-suk
639	Tapsong	Choe Ryon-hui
640	Songbong	Ri Sang-won
641	Ryonbong	Kim Mi-nam
642	Sinpha	Kim Sung-hui
643	Phophyong	Song Kum-nam
644	Koup	Ri Yong-il
645	Phungsan	Jon Tong-ho
646	Pochon	Rim Chun-nam
647	Samjiyon	Yang Myong-chol
648	Taehongdan	Kim Kwang-ho
649	Paekam	An Mun-hak
650	Yuphyong	Kim Kang-il
651	Unhung	Ri Song-guk
652	Saeangjang	Yun Pok-nam
653	Kapsan	Han Su-kyong
654	Oil	Kim Sang-uk
655	Phungso	Yon Kyong-chol
656	Samsu	Ju Hang-gon
657	Hanggu	Kang Yang-mo
658	Hupho	Pak Jun-ho
659	Munae	Song Sung-chol
660	Konguk	Choe Tong-myong
661	Ryusa	Kang Tok-chun
662	Waudo	Ri Kil-chun
663	Namsan	Kim Tuk-sam
664	Taedae	Jang Ryong-sik
665	Kapmun	Tokgo Chang-guk
666	Kangso	Kim Phyong-hae
667	Sohak	Jong Chol-jun
668	Chongsan	Yun Chun-hwa
669	Sogi	Ri Kwang-chol
670	Tokhung	Kim Yong-jae
671	Chollima	Kim Han-il
672	Kangson	Pak Kwang-ho
673	Pobong	Ri Nam-son
674	Hwasok	Kim Kye-gwan
675	Taean	Choe Sung-ryong
676	Oksu	Ro Ik
677	Ryonggang	Im Jong-sil
678	Ryongho	Chang Jae-ryong
679	Onchon	Rim Kyong-man
680	Haeun	Jo Kyong-guk
681	Sohwa	Sin In-ok
682	Kwisong	Sin Tong-ho
683	Rajin	Sin Yong-chol
684	Tongmyong	Choe Yong-bo
685	Changpyong	Han Jong-su
686	Sonbong	Jo Jong-ho
687	Ungsang	Sin Tong-su
