= O Kyong-sok =

North Korean politician (fl. 21st century)

Oh Kyong-sok
- 리히용

Chairman of the North Hamgyong Provincial People's Committee
- Incumbent
- Assumed office 2017
- Supreme Leader: Kim Jong Un
- Preceded by: Ri Sang-kwan

Personal details
- Political party: Workers' Party of Korea

O Kyung-sok (Korean: 오경석) is a North Korean politician who is the Chairman of the North Hamgyong Province People's Committee.

== Biography ==
After serving as the Chairman of the Chongjin City People's Committee, he was appointed as the Chairman of the North Hwanghae Province People's Committee in 2017, succeeding Ri Sang-kwan. In March 2019, he was elected as a Deputy to the 14th Supreme People's Assembly (No. 634 Kyonghung Constituency).
