= Chairman and Vice Chairman of the Workers' Party of Korea =

Defunct offices within the Workers's Party of Korea

- 조선로동당 위원장
- Emblem of the WPK Chairman

- Emblem of the Workers' Party of Korea
- Workers' Party of Korea
- Type: Deputy leader
- Residence: Government Complex No. 1
- Seat: Pyongyang
- Nominator: Central Committee
- Appointer: Central Committee
- Term length: No fixed term
- Constituting instrument: WPK Rulebook
- Inaugural holder: Pak Hon-yong
- Formation: 28 August 1946

The Chairman and Vice Chairman of the Workers' Party of Korea (WPK) were offices that existed within the WPK between 1949–66 and 2016–21. The office of "Chairman of the Central Committee" existed between 1949–66 and the office of "Chairman of the Workers' Party of Korea" existed in 2016–21. The deputy to the Chairman, the officeholder of Vice Chairman of the Central Committee existed in 1949–66 and 2016–21. This list also includes the chairmen and vice chairmen of the direct predecessors of the WPK.

== Title history ==
Title	Established	Abolished	Established by
Vice Chairman of the Central Committee of the Communist Party of North Korea	10 April 1946	30 August 1946	5th Enlarged Plenary Session of the North Korean Branch Bureau's Executive Committee
Vice Chairman of the Central Committee of the Workers' Party of North Korea	30 August 1946	24 June 1949	1st Congress of the Workers' Party of North Korea
Vice Chairman of the Central Committee of the Workers' Party of South Korea	24 November 1946	24 June 1949	1st Congress of the Workers' Party of South Korea
Vice Chairman of the Central Committee of the Workers' Party of Korea	24 June 1949	12 October 1966	1st Joint Plenary Session of the 2nd Central Committee of the Workers' Party of Korea
Vice Chairman of the Central Committee of the Workers' Party of Korea	9 May 2016	10 January 2021	7th Congress of the Workers' Party of Korea

== Chairmen ==
Title	Officeholder	Hangul	Birth	Death	Took office	Left office	Duration
Chairman of the Central Committee of the Communist Party of Korea	Pak Hon-yong	박헌영	1900	1955	14 September 1945	10 April 1946	208 days
Chairman of the Central Committee of the Communist Party of South Korea	Pak Hon-yong	박헌영	1900	1955	10 April 1946	24 November 1946	228 days
Chairman of the Central Committee of the Workers' Party of North Korea	Kim Tu-bong	김두봉	1889	1958	24 November 1946	24 June 1949	2 years and 212 days
Chairman of the Central Committee of the Workers' Party of South Korea	Ho Hon	허헌	1885	1951	24 November 1946	24 June 1949	2 years and 212 days
Chairman of the Central Committee of the Workers' Party of Korea	Kim Il Sung	김일성	1912	1994	24 June 1949	12 October 1966	17 years and 110 days
Chairman of the Workers' Party of Korea	Kim Jong Un	김정은	1983	Alive	9 May 2016	10 January 2021	4 years and 246 days

== Vice chairmen ==
Name	Hangul	Birth	Death	Took office	Left office	Duration	Rank
An Jong-su	안정수	1951	Alive	7 October 2017	31 December 2019	2 years and 85 days	
Choe Hwi	최휘	1954	Alive	7 October 2017	10 January 2021	3 years and 95 days	
Choe Ryong-hae	최룡해	1950	Alive	9 May 2016	10 January 2021	4 years and 246 days	
Choe Thae-bok	최태복	1930	2024	9 May 2016	7 October 2017	1 year and 151 days	
Choe Yong-gon	최용건	1900	1976	29 April 1956	12 October 1966	10 years and 166 days	1
Chong Il-yong	종일용	?	?	29 April 1956	18 September 1961	5 years and 142 days	4
Chu Yong-ha	주영하	1908	1956	30 August 1946	30 March 1948	1 year and 213 days	
Ho Ka-i	허가이	1908	1953	30 March 1948	24 June 1949	1 year and 86 days	
Ho Ka-i	허가이	1908	1953	24 June 1949	2 July 1953	4 years and 8 days	2
Kim Chang-man	김창만	?	?	29 April 1956	12 October 1966	10 years and 166 days	5
Kim Hyong-jun	김형준	1949	Alive	31 December 2019	10 January 2021	1 year and 10 days	
Kim Il	김일	1910	1984	6 August 1953	23 March 1954	229 days	3
Kim Il	김일	1910	1984	18 September 1961	12 October 1966	5 years and 24 days	2
Kim Il Sung	김일성	1912	1994	30 August 1946	24 June 1949	2 years and 298 days	
Kim Jae-ryong	김재룡	1959	Alive	13 August 2020	10 January 2021	150 days	
Kim Ki-nam	김기남	1929	2024	9 May 2016	7 October 2017	1 year and 151 days	
Kim Phyong-hae	김평해	1941	Alive	9 May 2016	31 December 2019	3 years and 236 days	
Kim Tok-hun	김덕훈	1961	Alive	31 December 2019	10 January 2021	1 year and 10 days	
Kim Yong-chol	김영철	1946	Alive	9 May 2016	10 January 2021	4 years and 246 days	
Kwak Pom-gi	곽범기	1939	Alive	9 May 2016	7 October 2017	1 year and 151 days	
O Su-yong	오수용	1944	Alive	9 May 2016	10 January 2021	4 years and 246 days	
Pak Chang-ok	박창옥	1911	1958	6 August 1953	23 March 1954	229 days	2
Pak Chong-ae	박정애	1907	1986	6 August 1953	18 September 1961	8 years and 43 days	1
Pak Hon-yong	박헌영	1900	1955	24 November 1946	24 June 1949	2 years and 212 days	
Pak Hon-yong	박헌영	1900	1955	24 June 1949	6 August 1953	4 years and 43 days	1
Pak Kum-chol	박금철	1911	1967	23 March 1954	12 October 1966	12 years and 203 days	3
Pak Kwang-ho	박광호	1949	Alive	7 October 2017	31 December 2019	2 years and 85 days	
Pak Pong-ju	박봉주	1939	Alive	10 April 2019	10 January 2021	1 year and 275 days	
Pak Thae-dok	박태덕	1955	Alive	7 October 2017	28 February 2020	2 years and 144 days	
Pak Thae-dok	박태덕	1955	Alive	13 August 2020	10 January 2021	150 days	
Pak Thae-song	박태성	1955	Alive	7 October 2017	10 January 2021	3 years and 95 days	
Pak Yong-bin	박용빈	?	?	23 March 1954	18 September 1961	7 years and 179 days	4
Ri Il-hwan	리일환	1960	Alive	31 December 2019	10 January 2021	1 year and 10 days	
Ri Man-gon	리만건	1945	Alive	9 May 2016	28 February 2020	3 years and 295 days	
Ri Pyong-chol	리병철	1948	Alive	31 December 2019	10 January 2021	1 year and 10 days	
Ri Su-yong	리수용	1940	Alive	9 May 2016	31 December 2019	3 years and 236 days	
Thae Jong-su	태종수	1936	Alive	7 October 2017	31 December 2019	2 years and 85 days	
Yi Hyo-sun	이효선	?	?	18 September 1961	12 October 1966	5 years and 24 days	5
Yi Ki-sok	이기석	?	?	24 November 1946	24 June 1949	2 years and 212 days	
