= Kim Chang-son =

North Korean politician (1944–2025)

- Hangul: 김창선
- RR: Gim Changseon
- MR: Kim Ch'angsŏn

Kim Chang-son (Korean: 김창선, 1944 – 26 December 2025) was a North Korean politician. As chief secretary of the Secretariat of the State Affairs Commission, he was the de facto chief of staff to leader Kim Jong Un.

== Early life and career ==
Kim Chang-son was born in 1944 in Myongchon County, North Hamgyong Province. He studied Russian and Soviet Studies at Kim Il Sung University and was fluent in Russian. His career in the Workers' Party of Korea began in 1969 when he joined the Ministry of People's Armed Forces (MPAF) External Affairs Bureau. In 1970, he was appointed deputy military attache at the embassy of North Korea in Moscow. In 1974, he returned to the DPRK and was appointed to a senior position in the MPAF External Affairs Bureau, and in 1980 he was appointed deputy director of the bureau. In 1982, he became deputy director-general.

In 1984, he was appointed deputy director of the Workers' Party of Korea Administration Department and became director of the department in 1988. In 1992, he was awarded Hero of Labour. Around 1993, he was appointed deputy director of the Workers' Party of Korea Organization Guidance Department and joined Kim Jong Il's Personal Secretariat.

In the early 2000s, he was temporarily banished from Pyongyang due to an unknown breach of rules on his part and served as the Workers' Party of Korea Committee Organizational Secretary of Anju, South Pyongan. In 2009, he returned to Pyongyang.

In 2012, he was made director and chief secretary of the Secretariat of the National Defence Commission, which became the State Affairs Commission of the Democratic People's Republic of Korea in 2016.

In 2018, he was still the director of North Korea's state affairs commission secretariat and, as part of that, he met with Joe Hagin, a deputy White House chief of staff, met at the Capella Hotel in Singapore in late May to work out security and logistics measures for a meeting between Kim and Trump.

Kim was elected to the 14th Supreme People's Assembly in 2019.

== Personal life and death ==
His wife Ryu Chun-ok was a section chief in the Workers' Party of Korea International Affairs Department and a friend of Kim Kyong-hui. She died from alcohol-related illness in 1989; he remarried in 1990. Kim died on 26 December 2025, at the age of 81.
