= Pak Song Bong =

North Korean politician

- 박송봉

WPK Central Committee member
- Chairman: Kim Il Sung

Personal details
- Born: September 20, 1931 North Korea
- Died: February 20, 2001 (aged 69)
- Resting place: Patriotic Martyrs' Cemetery
- Citizenship: North Korean
- Party: Workers' Party of Korea
- Education: Mangyongdae Revolutionary School
- Occupation: Politician

Pak Song Bong (Korean: 박송봉; September 20, 1931 – February 20, 2001) was a North Korean politician.

== Biography ==
Pak Song Bong was born September 20, 1931. He was the son of Pak-Gil, a political member of the Yangil Battalion, an anti-Japanese partisan group. Both of his parents were murdered in 1936. After the liberation of Korea, he went to study in Romania in 1951, graduating from Mangyongdae Revolutionary School. After graduating from college, Pak obtained a qualification as a power engineer. On his return to North Korea in 1957, he worked at the Organization and Guidance Department, the Science Education Department, and the Machinery Industry Department.

He was elected as a candidate member of the Central Committee in October 1981, and in June 1983 elected as a member of the Central Committee at the 6th and 7th plenary sessions. On April 13, 1985, he was awarded the Order of Kim Il Sung on the 40th anniversary of liberation and the 40th anniversary of the founding of the Party. Pak was appointed First Deputy Director of the Ministry of Science and Education in June 1986; in this capacity he visited the USSR in September 1987. A year later, Pak was appointed First Deputy Director of the Ministry of Armaments and Industry. In April 1992, he became a double recipient of the Order of Kim Il Sung during the Commemoration of 80th birthday of Kim Il Sung.

Pak served as a member of the funeral commission following the July 1994 death of Kim Il Sung, and in February 1995, he served as a member of the funeral commission of O Jin-u.

Pak Song Bong died on February 20, 2001, at the age of 69. He was buried in the Patriotic Martyrs' Cemetery. In the opening remarks of the 7th Party Congress in May 2016, Kim Jong Un referred to him as one of 'loyal revolutionary comrades who devotedly fought for the strengthening development of the Workers' Party of Korea and the victory of the socialist cause'.
