= Ri Ho-rim =

North Korean politician

- 리호림

Member of the Politburo and 5th plenum of the 7th Central Committee of the WPK

Personal details
- Party: Workers' Party of Korea

Ri Ho-rim (Korean: 리호림) is a North Korean politician. He is a member of the Politburo of the Central Committee of the Workers' Party of Korea. He is Director of the Central United Front Department. In 2019 he became an alternate member of the Politburo.

In December 2019, he attended the 5th Plenary Meeting of the 7th Central Committee of the Workers' Party of Korea, where he was elected as an alternate member of the 7th Politburo and appointed Director of the Light Industry Department of the Party Central Committee, succeeding An Jong-su.

In March 2020 he was seen voting in a meeting of the Politburo, a right reserved for full members only, and thus it was assumed he has become a full member.

On February 22, 2026, he was elected as a member of the Central Committee at the 9th Congress. At the enlarged 2nd Plenary Meeting of the 9th Central Committee held from June 20 to 22, he succeeded Han Kwang-sang as Director of the Light Industry Department and was promoted to an alternate member of the 9th Politburo.

In January 2020, he served on the funeral committee for Hwang Sun-hui.
