= Thae Jong-su =

North Korean politician

Member of the North Korean Parliament for Chongnyon

Vice Chairman of the Workers' Party of Korea

Director of the Munitions Industry Department of the WPK

Personal details
- Born: 20 March 1936 (age 90) Myonggan County, North Hamgyong Province
- Party: Workers' Party of Korea
- Education: Mangyongdae Revolutionary School
- Alma mater: Kim Il Sung University

Korean name
- Hangul: 태종수
- Hanja: 太鐘守
- RR: Tae Jongsu
- MR: T'ae Chongsu

Thae Jong-su (Korean: 태종수; born 20 March 1936) is a North Korean politician. He was a Vice Chairman of the Workers' Party of Korea (WPK) and the director of the Munitions Industry Department of the WPK. He is a full member of the 7th Central Committee of the WPK, a full member of the 7th Politburo of the WPK and a member of the State Affairs Commission of North Korea.

== Biography ==
Thae was born in Myonggan County, North Hamgyong Province. He was educated at Mangyongdae Revolutionary School and Kim Il Sung University. His political career dates back to the late 1960s. He received his first important post in 1970 when he was appointed chief secretary of the North Pyongan WPK Provincial Committee. He has also served as a Vice Premier of North Korea. Thae is described as "a highly experienced manager and can be identified as being part of the cohort of technocrats who have come back to power under Kim Jong Un".

Thae was elected to the Supreme People's Assembly (SPA) from Sosang in 2014. In 2019, he renewed his seat from Chongnyon.

Thae became a member of the party's Central Military Commission in April 2019. The same month, he retained his membership in the Presidium of the SPA, which he had held during the previous SPA term.

== See also ==
- Politics of North Korea
