= Namsan Senior High School =

Former elite high school in Pyongyang, North Korea

Namsan Senior High School (Korean: 남산고급중학교) was an elite school in Pyongyang, North Korea.

== Curriculum ==
Kim Il Sung required that Russian be taught at the school.

As of 2012, Mangyongdae School, the Kang Ban-sok Institute, and Namsan High School are for the families with very high songbun rankings. No wavering or hostile class children and very few children of high songbun, outside of the three “lines”, are allowed to attend these schools, and special schools like these do not exist outside of Pyongyang.

== Alumni ==
- Kim Jong Il (graduated in 1960)
- Ri Yong-ho (graduated in 1973)
