= Embassy of North Korea, Moscow =

Diplomatic mission of the Democratic People's Republic of Korea to the Russian Federation

Embassy of North Korea in Moscow
- Посольство Корейской Народно-Демократической Республики 로씨야련방주재 조선민주주의인민공화국 대사관 (Russian)
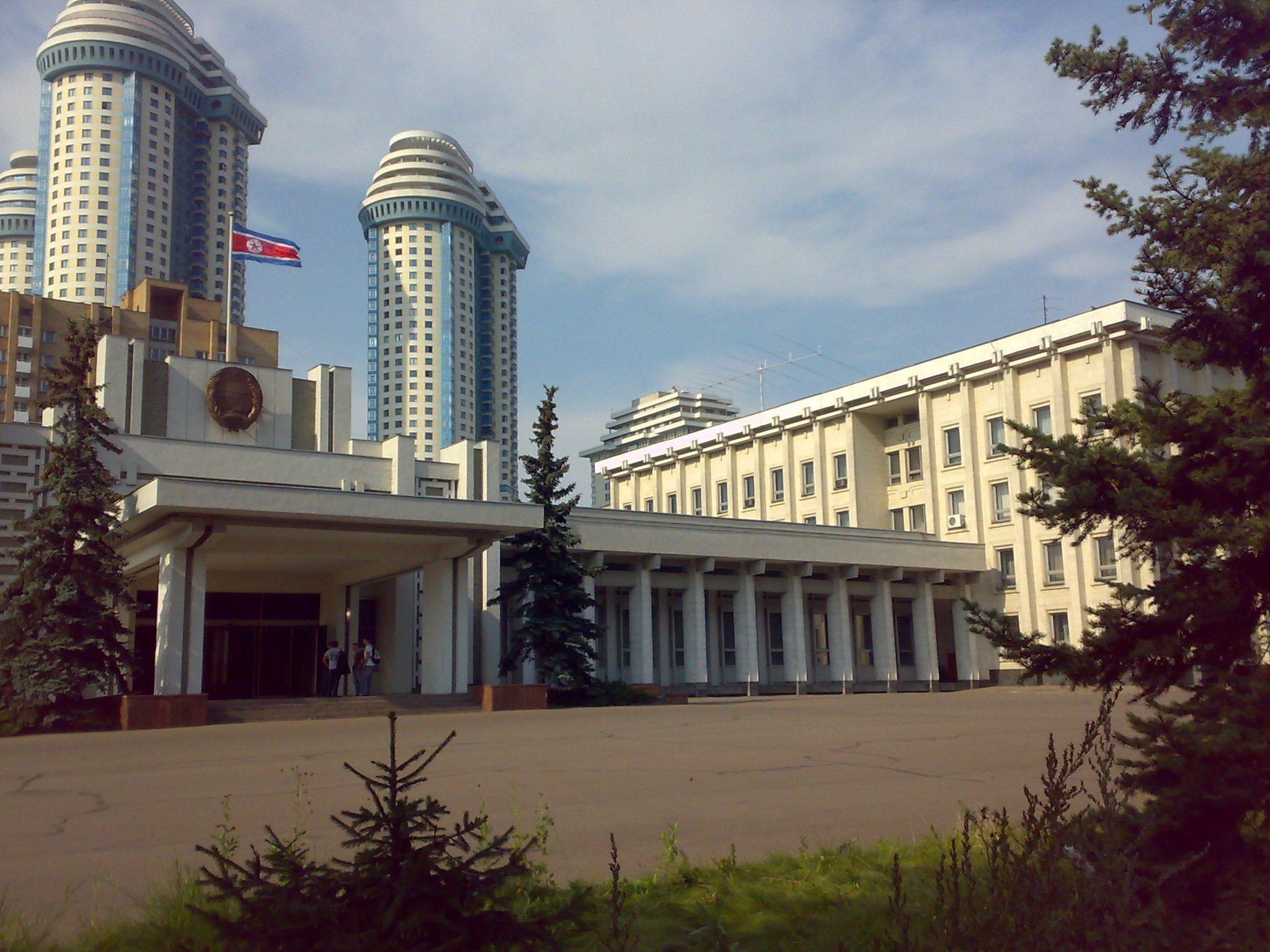
- Embassy of North Korea in Moscow
- Interactive map of Embassy of North Korea in Moscow
- 55.712712°N 37.508612°E
- Location: 72 Mosfilmovskaya Street, Moscow, Russia (Russian: Мосфильмовская ул., 72)

The Embassy of the Democratic People's Republic of Korea in Moscow (Посольство Корейской Народно-Демократической Республики, 로씨야련방주재 조선민주주의인민공화국 대사관) is the chief diplomatic mission of North Korea in the Russian Federation. It is located at 72 Mosfilmovskaya Street (Russian: Мосфильмовская ул., 72) in the Ramenki District of Moscow at the corner of Mosfilmovskaya Street and Lomonosovsky Prospekt.

Since February 2020, the ambassador in Russia is currently Sin Hong-chol. The previous ambassador was Kim Hyong-jun.

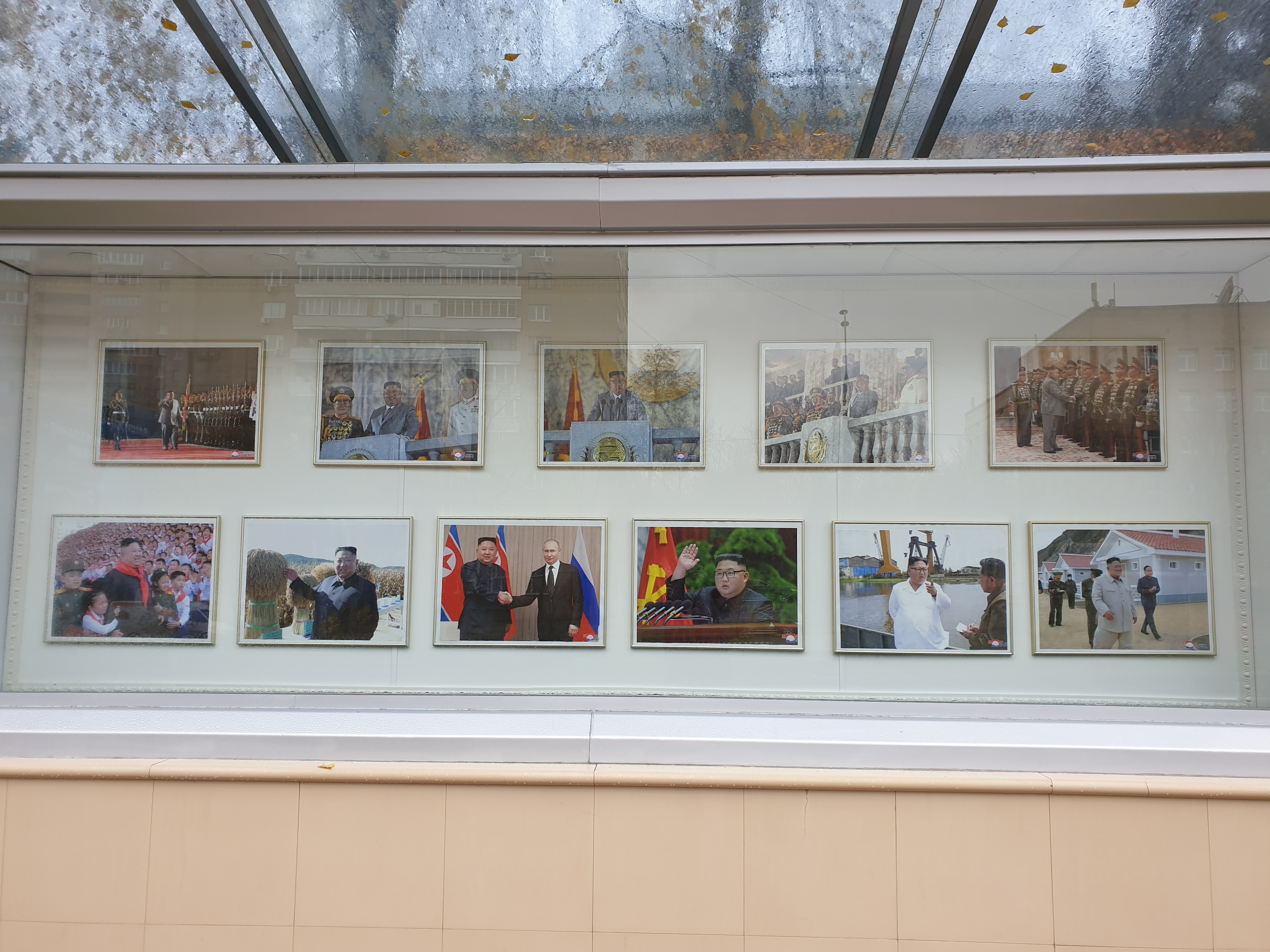
Display in front of North Korea embassy in Moscow on November 7, 2020, showing pictures of North Korean leader Kim Jong-un and Russian President Vladimir Putin.

== See also ==
- North Korea–Russia relations
- Embassy of Russia, Pyongyang
- Diplomatic missions in Russia
- Diplomatic missions in North Korea
