= Kim Phyong-hae =

North Korean politician (born 1941)

Deputy to the Supreme People's Assembly
- Incumbent
- Assumed office 1998

Head of the Cadre Affairs Department of the Workers' Party of Korea
- In office 28 September 2010 – 31 December 2019
- Leader: Kim Jong Il; Kim Jong Un
- Preceded by: Kim Kuk-thae
- Succeeded by: Ho Chol-man

Personal details
- Born: 8 October 1941 (age 84) Chonchon County, Jagang Province, North Korea

- Kim Phyong-hae
- Hangul: 김평해
- Hanja: 金平海
- RR: Gim Pyeonghae
- MR: Kim P'yŏnghae

Kim Phyong-hae (Korean: 김평해, born 8 October 1941) is a North Korean politician. He was a Vice Chairman of the Workers' Party of Korea (WPK) and the director of the Cadres' Affairs Department of the WPK. He is a full member of the 7th Central Committee of the WPK and a full member of the Politburo of the WPK. Kim is also a deputy to the 13th Supreme People's Assembly.

== Career ==
Kim was born on 8 October 1941. In 1989, he was appointed Secretary of Organization of the WPK Pyongyang City Committee. In 1994 he was awarded the Order of Kim Il Sung. In 1997 he was appointed Chief Secretary of the North Pyongan Province provincial committee and chair of the provincial people's committee, serving until 2003. In 1998 he was elected a deputy to the 10th Supreme People's Assembly. He was re-elected in 2003 and 2009. He entered the Politburo as an alternate member in September 2010, following the 3rd Party Conference, and was promoted to full member at the 7th Congress in May 2016. He led the Cadre Department of the party, serving simultaneously as vice-chairman of the Central Committee (the position was called "secretary of the Central Committee" until 2016). He was replaced in December 2019 at a Central Committee plenum.
