= Choe Hwi =

North Korean politician (born 1954)

Member of the North Korean Parliament for Subok

Chairman of the State Physical Culture and Sports Guidance Commission
- Incumbent
- Assumed office December 2017
- Preceded by: Choe Ryong-hae

Personal details
- Born: January 1, 1954 (age 72) Nampo, South Pyongan Province, North Korea
- Party: Workers' Party of Korea
- Education: Red Flag Mangyongdae Revolutionary School
- Alma mater: Kim Il Sung University

Korean name
- Hangul: 최휘
- Hanja: 崔輝
- RR: Choe Hwi
- MR: Ch'oe Hwi

Choe Hwi (Korean: 최휘, born 1954) is a North Korean politician. He was a Vice Chairman of the Workers' Party of Korea (WPK) and the chairman of the State Physical Culture and Sports Guidance Commission. Choe's portfolio as the Vice Chairman of the party covered workers' and social organizations affairs. Choe was also an alternate member of the Politburo of the WPK, member of the Central Committee of the WPK, and a deputy to the Supreme People's Assembly.

Choe was a relatively low-profile politician working in the cultural field and the Kim Il Sung Socialist Youth League until about 2013 or 2014. With his ascension to the post of senior deputy director of the Propaganda and Agitation Department (PAD) in 2013, he became seen as a potential successor to propaganda chief Kim Ki-nam. After becoming the chairman of the State Physical Culture and Sports Guidance Commission in 2017, Choe was seen as rising to the power elite of the country.

== Early life ==
Choe Hwi was born in 1954. His father was Choe Chae-ha. He has a sister, Choe Mi-rim. Choe Hwi was educated at the Red Flag Mangyongdae Revolutionary School and Kim Il Sung University Department of Philosophy.

== Career ==
Choe received his first significant political post in 1985 as a manager of the Sea of Blood Opera Troupe. In 1987 he became the head of the Pyongyang Art Troupe. In the 1990s he was a vice chairman of Pomminyon (Pan National Alliance for Korea's Unification).

In January 1996, Choe became a secretary on the central committee of the Kim Il Sung Socialist Youth League and was tasked with extracurricular education. He returned to his old post as the head of the Pyongyang Art Troupe in 2000. In 2004, he became a deputy director of a department of the Central Committee of the Workers' Party of Korea (WPK). He was involved in setting up the Unhasu Orchestra and the Moranbong Band.

In April 2013 Choe became the senior deputy director of the Propaganda and Agitation Department (PAD). In December 2015, Choe was the leader of the Merited State Choir and the Moranbong Band on a tour to China when the planned concerts were abruptly called off.

Until around 2013 and 2014, Choe was a relatively routine member of Kim Jong Un's on-the-spot guidance tours. With his promotion to PAD, however, he was seen as a potential successor to propaganda chief Kim Ki-nam. According to Adam Cathcart of Sino-NK, "Choe Hwi has a lot to say about statues, monuments, and inscriptions" and of propaganda overall.

Choe was elected to the 13th Supreme People's Assembly in the March 2014 election from Constituency 171 (Subok). He became a member of the 7th Central Committee of the WPK at the party's 7th Congress in May 2016. During the second plenary meeting of the central committee, he was elevated to the position of Vice Chairman of the WPK and alternate member in its politburo. Choe's portfolio as the Vice Chairman of the party covers workers' and social organizations affairs. In December 2017, he replaced Choe Ryong-hae as the chairman of the National Physical Culture and Sports Guidance Commission. Before this appointment, Choe was considered relatively unknown and it was seen as a sign of Choe's rise to the power elite of North Korea.

Choe belonged to the delegation that traveled to South Korea for the 2018 Winter Olympics to meet President Moon Jae-in. A special permit by the United Nations Security Council's North Korea sanctions committee had to be secured for Choe's travel, because the Security Council had imposed an international travel ban and an asset freeze on him with the United Nations Security Council Resolution 2356 of 2017. Choe was the only person from the 23-strong North Korean delegation who was under Security Council sanctions. Choe is also under US sanctions.

== See also ==
- Politics of North Korea

Political offices
Preceded by Choe Ryong-hae	Chairman of the State Physical Culture and Sports Guidance Commission; 2017–present	Incumbent
