= Pak Jong-nam =

North Korean politician

- 박정남

Director of the Document Archives Department of the Workers' Party of Korea
- Incumbent
- Assumed office January 2021

Chairman of the WPK Kangwon Provincial Committee
- In office May 2016 – January 2021
- Preceded by: Himself (as Secretary)
- Succeeded by: Kim Su-gil

Chief Secretary of the WPK Kangwon Provincial Committee
- In office May 2013 – May 2016
- Preceded by: Paek Kye-ryong
- Succeeded by: Himself (as Chairman)

Personal details
- Political party: Workers' Party of Korea

Pak Jong-nam (Korean: 박정남) is a North Korean politician. He is a member of Central Committee of the Workers' Party of Korea and Director of the WPK Document Archives.

== Biography ==
In March 1996, he took over as the WPK Committee of Hamhung, and in July 2001 was appointed secretary of Kangwon Province WPK Committee. In May 2013, he became the party chief secretary in Kangwon Province succeeding Paek Kye-ryong.

He was a member of the funeral committee of Kim Kuk-thae in December 2013, Jon Pyong-ho in July 2014, Ri Ul-sol in November 2015, Kim Yang-gon in December 2015, Kang Sok-ju in May 2016, Kim Yong-chun in August 2018, Kim Chol-man in December 2018, and Hwang Sun-hui in January 2020. In 2014, he was elected as a deputy to the 13th Supreme People's Assembly, and was re-elected to the 14th SPA in 2019.

In May 2016, at the 7th Congress of the Workers' Party of Korea he was appointed a member of the Central Committee. In June 2016 he was elected chairman of the Party Committee of Kangwon Province. He was elected as an alternate member of the Politburo of the WPK in April 2019 and was appointed to the SPLA Legislative Committee in the same month, In January 2021, at the 8th WPK Congress, Pak was appointed as the director of the WPK Document Archives.
