= Ri Yong-ho (diplomat) =

North Korean politician and diplomat

- 리용호
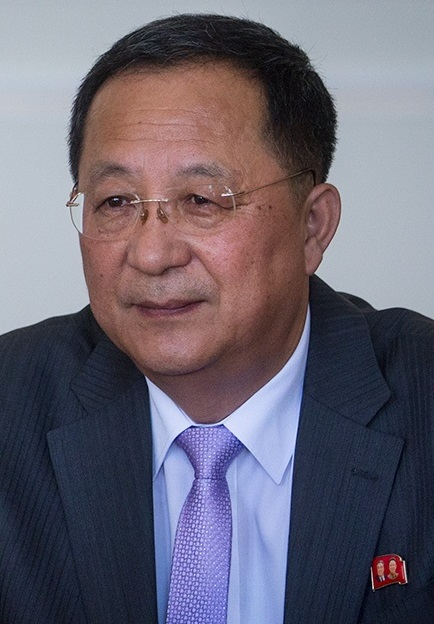

Minister of Foreign Affairs

14th term
- In office 11 April 2019 – 18 January 2020
- Chairman: Kim Jong Un
- Premier: Kim Jae-ryong
- Succeeded by: Ri Son-gwon

13th term
- In office 13 May 2016 – 11 April 2019
- Chairman: Kim Jong Un
- Premier: Pak Pong-ju
- Preceded by: Ri Su-yong

Personal details
- Born: 10 July 1956 (age 70) Pyongyang, North Korea
- Party: Workers' Party of Korea
- Education: Pyongyang Foreign Language University

Korean name
- Hangul: 리용호
- Hanja: 李容浩
- RR: Ri Yongho
- MR: Ri Yongho
- IPA: ɾi.joŋ.ɦo

Ri Yong-ho (Korean: 리용호; Korean pronunciation: [ɾi.joŋ.ɦo]; born 10 July 1956) is a North Korean politician and diplomat who served as the minister of foreign affairs of North Korea from 2016 to 2020.

Ri's current status is unclear. The Japanese newspaper Yomiuri Shimbun in 2022 reported that he had been executed, citing unnamed sources. South Korea's National Intelligence Service confirmed that Ri was purged but was not able to verify his reported execution. In July 2024, Ri Il-kyu, a former North Korean diplomat and defector, told The Chosun Ilbo that he had been sent to a penal colony, not executed.

Ri was known as a skillful negotiator with experience in negotiating with the United States on the North Korean nuclear program. In particular, he had headed North Korea's negotiators at the six-party talks. His diplomatic career spanned more than 30 years, including posts in various embassies. Ri was the ambassador to the United Kingdom between 2003 and 2007.

Ri was a full member of the 7th Central Committee of the Workers' Party of Korea and its Politburo, and was a deputy to the 14th Supreme People's Assembly.

== Early life and education ==
Ri was born in 1956; his father was Ri Myong-je, a close aide of the Kim dynasty and a former editor of the Korean Central News Agency. Ri graduated from the elite Namsan High School in Pyongyang in 1973. He majored in English at the Pyongyang Foreign Language University.

== Career ==
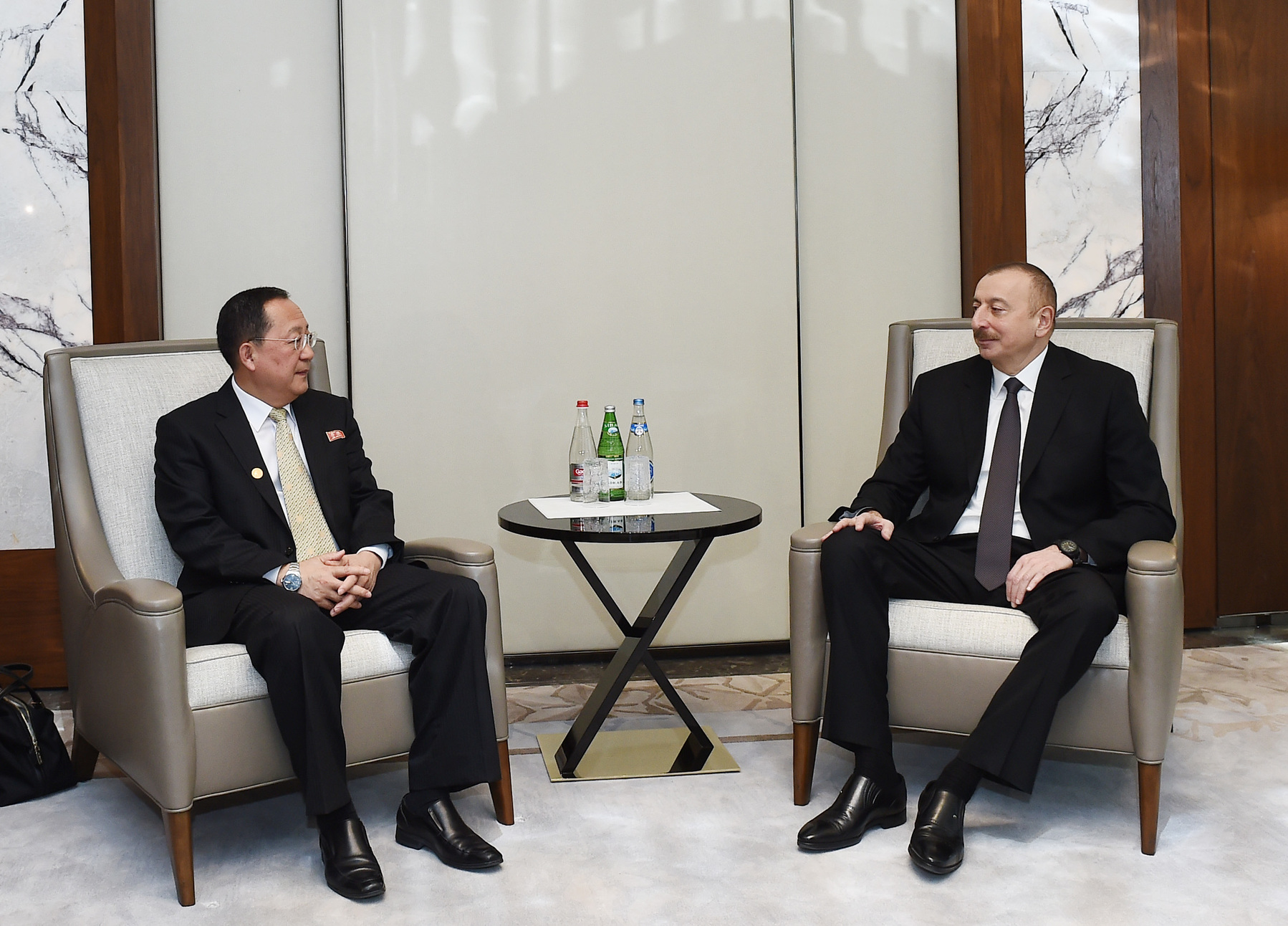
Ri with President Ilham Aliyev of Azerbaijan in 2018

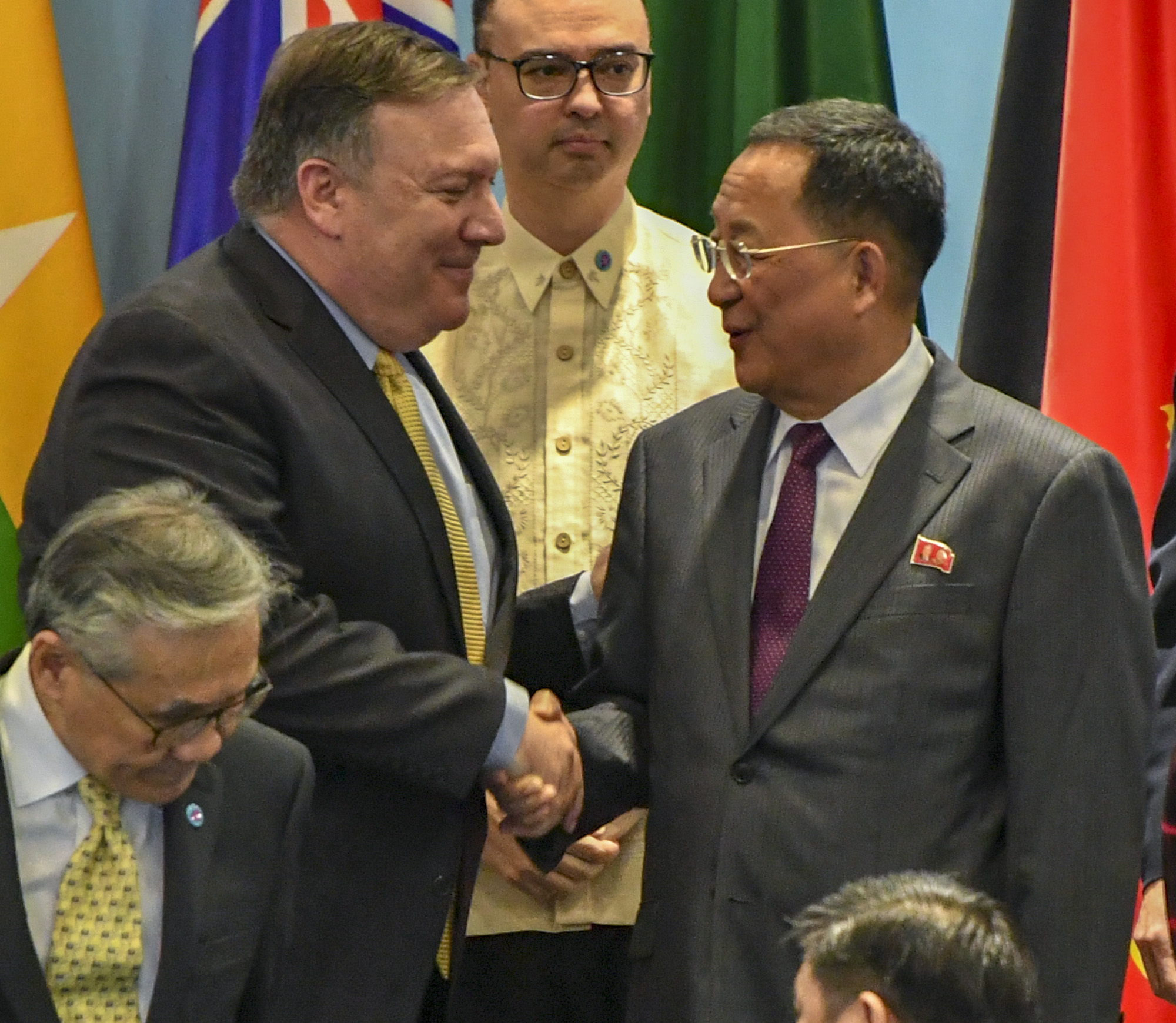
Ri meets US Secretary of State Mike Pompeo in August 2018

Ri was a career diplomat with more than 30 years of service in foreign affairs. Proficient in English, he was described as "a skilled negotiator". Ri had extensive experience in negotiating with the U.S. on the issue of the North Korean nuclear program.

Ri entered the Ministry of Foreign Affairs in 1978. In 1979, he became a secretary at the North Korean embassy in Zimbabwe for four years. Between 1985 and 1988 he served as a secretary at the North Korean embassy to Sweden.

After his post in Sweden, Ri returned to the foreign ministry in 1988, where he was leader, supervisor and vice director of the International Organizations Bureau of the ministry. This post allowed him to become involved in negotiations with the U.S. In 1995 he was promoted a counselor at the ministry. At the time, he was described as a close ally of Kang Sok-ju. He took part in direct negotiations with the U.S. in the 1990s. In October 2000, he was ambassador-at-large accompanying Jo Myong-rok to negotiations in Washington. In the 2000s, he served as ambassador in Western European countries; he was Ambassador to the United Kingdom between 2003 and 2007. Ri was appointed as Vice Minister of Foreign Affairs on 23 September 2010, serving for part of the time under Ri Su-yong. Ri was North Korea's leading representative at the six-party talks in 2011. Ri's team negotiated the "Leap day agreement" during the Six-party talks. In 2011, Ri met with South Korean negotiators in Bali to broker a deal on continuing nuclear disarmament talks.

Ri was appointed Minister of Foreign Affairs on 9 May 2016. His promotion came after the 7th Congress of the Workers' Party of Korea, which made him a full member of the Central Committee and an alternate member of the Politburo. Previously, since 28 September 2010, he had been an alternate member of the Central Committee. Ri is also a deputy to the 14th Supreme People's Assembly, representing the 371st Electoral District (Unha).

In August 2017, amid heightened tensions on the Korean Peninsula, Ri took part in a rare multilateral meeting with foreign ministers at a summit meeting in Manila, Philippines. Ri negotiated with his South Korean, Chinese, and Russian counterparts, making the meeting only two parties – the United States and Japan – short of the makeup of the six-party talks. On 7 August, Ri said that his country will never negotiate away North Korea's nuclear weapons.

On 23 September 2017, Ri attended the UN General Assembly and gave a speech in which he remarked that Donald Trump is "chastised even by the American people as 'Commander in Grief', 'Lying King', [and] 'President Evil'." Subsequently, he was made a full member of the Politburo. According to Michael Madden of Johns Hopkins University, "Ri can now be safely identified as one of North Korea's top policy makers ... Even if he has informal or off the record meetings, Ri's interlocutors can be assured that whatever proposals they proffer will be taken directly to the top".

In August 2019, Ri condemned the 2019 Hong Kong protests, stating: "North Korea fully supports the stand and measures of China to defend the sovereignty, security and territorial integrity of the country and safeguard the prosperity and stability of Hong Kong, and concerns about foreign forces interference in Hong Kong issue."

In January 2020 Ri was dismissed from his position as Minister of Foreign Affairs. His successor was announced two days later as Ri Son-Gwon, who is known as a hardliner.

== See also ==
- Foreign relations of North Korea
- List of current foreign ministers
- List of foreign ministers in 2017

Diplomatic posts
New office	North Korean Ambassador to the United Kingdom; 2003–2006	Succeeded by Ja Song-nam
Political offices
Preceded by Ri Su-yong	Minister of Foreign Affairs; 2016–2020	Succeeded by Ri Son-gwon
