= Red Flag Mangyongdae Revolutionary School =

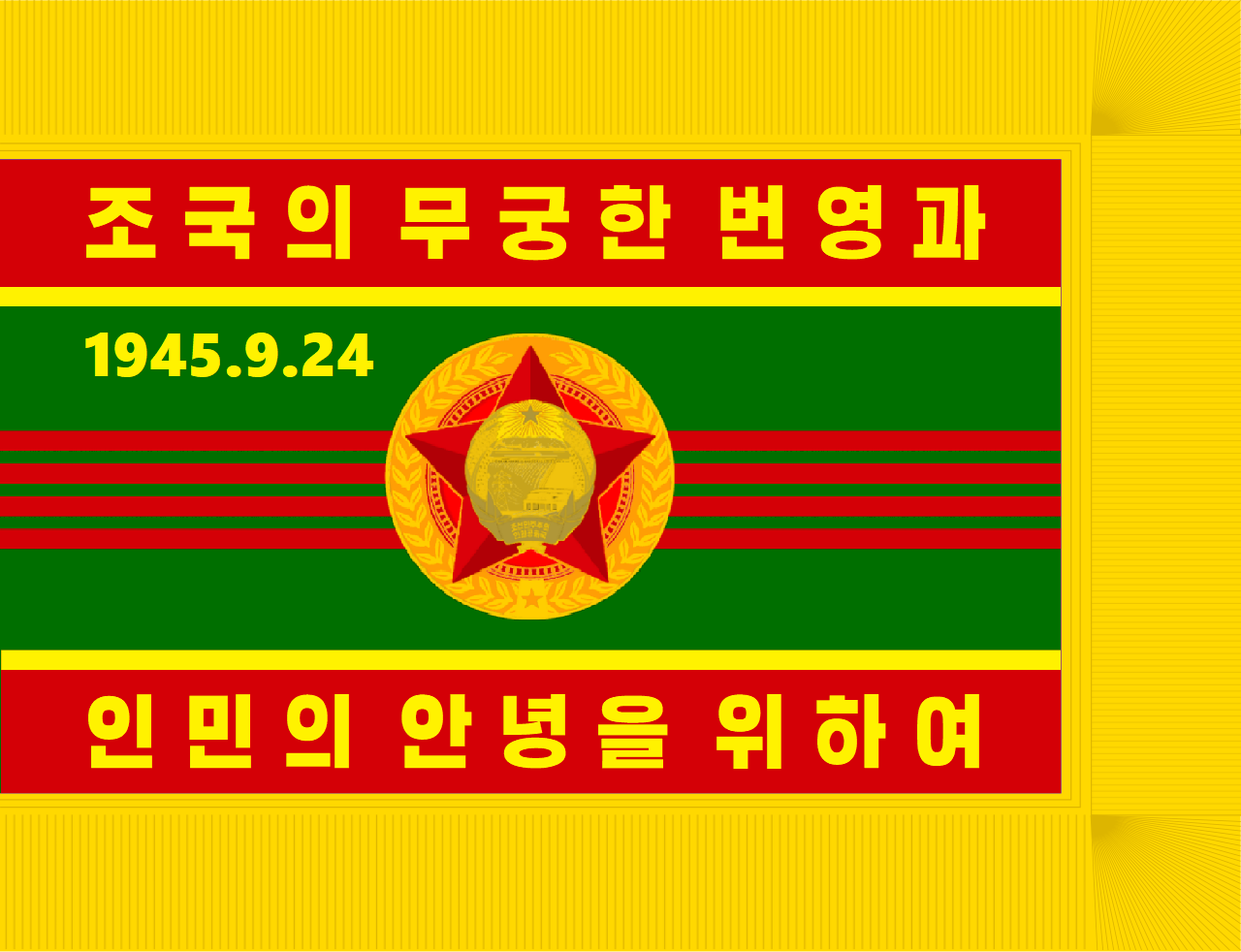
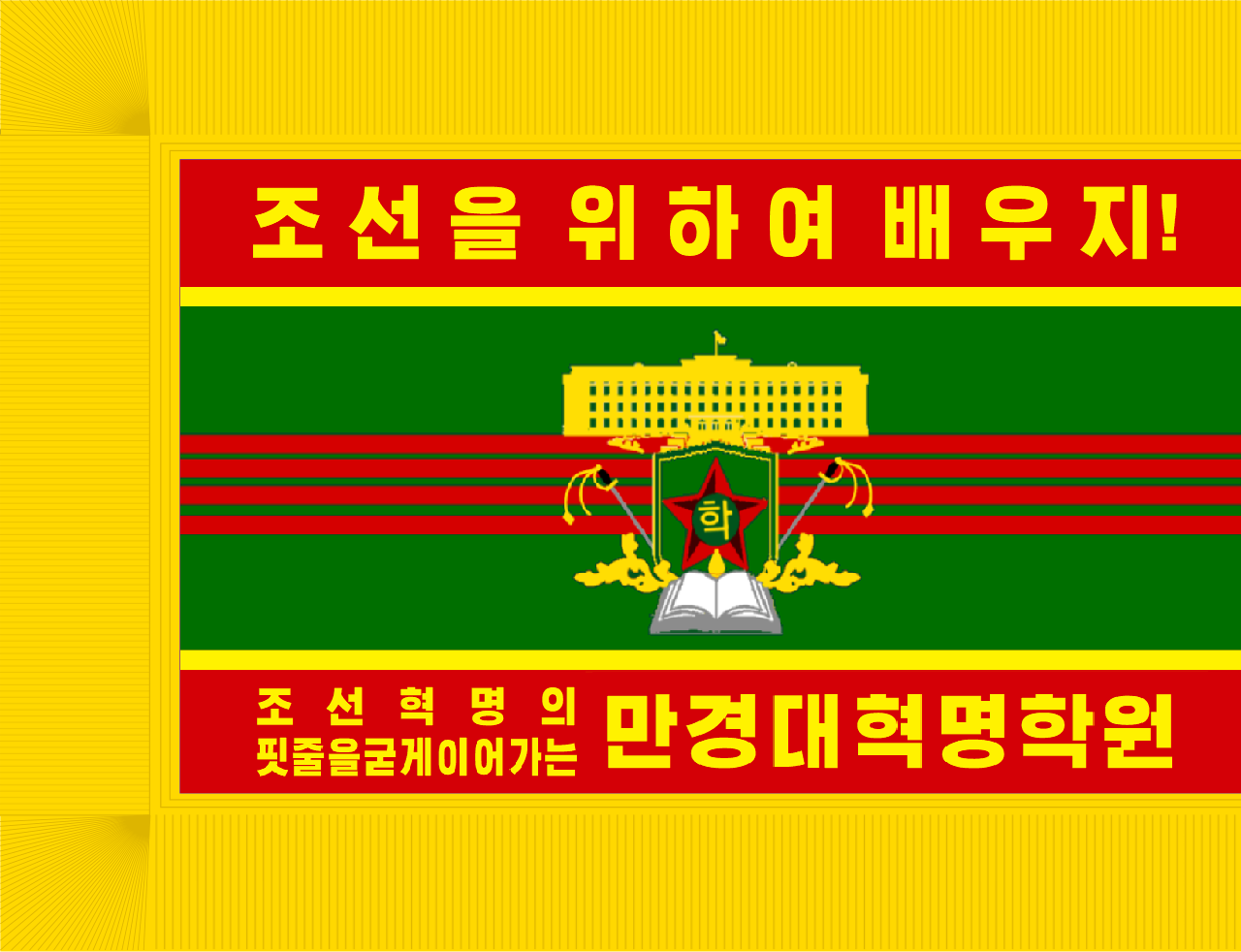
- Emblem and both sides of the flag of the Mangyongdae Revolutionary School

Location
- Pyongyang; North Korea; 38°59′54″N 125°39′43″E

Information
- Type: School
- Established: October 12, 1947
- Founder: Kim Il Sung
- School district: Mangyongdae district
- Administrator: Gen. Kim Song-chol
- Teaching staff: Ri Kyong Hui
- Gender: Male
- National ranking: High
- Affiliation: Kang Pan-sok Revolutionary School in the western city of Nampho

Red Flag Mangyongdae Revolutionary School is an elite public secondary school in the Mangyongdae district of Pyongyang city, North Korea. Established in 1947, it is a special education school with access only to the Workers' Party of Korea, Korean People's Army, administrative and high-ranking officials’ families. According to the U.S.-based Committee for Human Rights in North Korea, Mankyongdae School was one of three schools, alongside the Kang Pan-sok Institute and Namsan Senior High School, which serve families with very high Songbun rankings. No wavering or hostile class children and very few children of high songbun, outside of the three “lines”, are allowed to attend these schools, and special schools like these do not exist outside of Pyongyang.

== History ==
Originally, the school was called the Pyongyang School for the Bereaved Children of Revolutionaries (평양혁명자유가족학원), which was to "receive children of fallen revolutionaries" and "educate their children and train them into fine revolutionaries after the independence of Korea". It was located at Kan-ri, Daedong, South Pyongan. After the formal establishment of North Korea it was moved to Pyongyang and there the first statue of Kim Il Sung was erected, according to North Korean authorities, at the suggestion of Kim Jong-suk, Kim Il-sung's wife.

As of April 2012, Lt. Col. Kim Hak Bin was an administrator at the school. Ri Kyong Hui was a biology teacher.

At one time, Kim Won-ju, who was Kim Hyong-rok's third son, was assigned the position as State Security Department officer whose assignments included rooting out disloyalty to the regime among students at the ultra-elite Mangyongdae School.

In 1982, then-Chief of General Staff O Kuk-ryol said the school produced revolutionary warriors.

By 1987, graduates were:

- 20% of the central party committee,
- 30% of the party politburo, and
- 32% of the military commission of the central committee.

As of April 2013, the all girls version of this school is at the Kang Pan-sok Revolutionary School in the western city of Nampho.

Kim Jong Un, who was educated in Switzerland, is not an alumnus of this school and has visited this school six times as of July 2018, the most recent being in 2022 where he attended the school's 75th anniversary.

== Curriculum ==
In addition to a high school curriculum, students receive military training. Graduates enter the army for three years and usually become party members. Generally, about 120 students graduate per year. According to Kang Myong-do, "children of the elite, who in the past would have gone to Namsan now went to Mangyongdae." If the parents of a child were still alive, then only children of officials at least at the level of party department head were eligible to enroll.

== Alumni ==
- Kim Jong Il
- General O Kuk-ryol
- the daughter of Kim Hyong-gwon
- the illegitimate children of Kim Il Sung
- According to Ko Yong-hwan, Kim Jong-su went to this school.
- Vice Marshal Kim Yong-chun (NDC Vice Chairman and Minister of the People's Armed Forces)
- General Hyon Chol-hae (Director of the NDC Standing Committee [Presidium])
- Yon Hyong-muk, the North Korean premier in 1988-92
- Thae Jong-su
- Mónica, Maribel, and Paco Macías, the three youngest children of Francisco Macías Nguema.
