= Kim Song-il (North Korean politician) =

North Korean politician

WPK Provincial Party Committee Chairman of South Hamgyong Province
- In office April 2016 – 5 September 2020
- Supreme Leader: Kim Jong Un
- Preceded by: Thae Jong-su
- Succeeded by: Kim Chol-sam

Personal details
- Citizenship: North Korean
- Party: Workers' Party of Korea
- Occupation: Politician

Kim Song-il (Korean: 김성일) is a politician of North Korea. He is a full member of the Central Committee of the Workers' Party of Korea and chairman of the Provincial Party Committee of the South Hamgyong Province.

== Biography ==
In May 2016, he was appointed a member of the 7th Central Committee of the Workers' Party of Korea and Chairman of the Party Committee of South Hamgyong Province, replacing Thae Jong-su.

On September 5, 2020, he was dismissed by Kim Jong Un following the damage caused by Typhoon Maysak. It was reported that he was replaced by a vice director from the Organizational Leadership Department who has not yet been named. Kim Jong Un relieved him of command due to not being prepared for the typhoon and for an inadequate response following the typhoon.
