= Ri Su-yong =

North Korean diplomat and politician

- 리수용
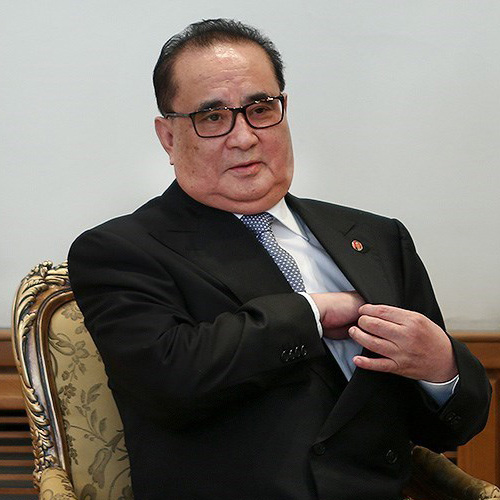

Chairman of the Supreme People's Assembly Foreign Affairs Committee
- In office 11 April 2017 – 12 April 2020
- Chairman: Kim Jong Un
- Presidium President: Kim Yong-nam; Choe Ryong-hae
- Preceded by: Post established
- Succeeded by: Kim Hyong-jun

Minister of Foreign Affairs

13th term
- In office 9 April 2014 – 9 May 2016
- Chairman: Kim Jong Un
- Premier: Pak Pong-ju
- Preceded by: Pak Ui-chun
- Succeeded by: Ri Yong-ho

Personal details
- Born: 15 June 1940 (age 86) Kankyōnan Province, Korea, Empire of Japan
- Education: University of International Affairs
- Awards: Order of Kim Jong Il

Korean name
- Hangul: 리수용
- RR: Ri Suyong
- MR: Ri Suyong
- IPA: ɾi.su.joŋ

Alternate name
- Hangul: 이철
- RR: I Cheol
- MR: I Ch'ŏl

Ri Su-yong (리수용; born 15 June 1940), also known as Ri Chol (이철), (Note: Ri Su-yong was known as Ri Chol in his previous posts during the 1980s up until at least 2012.) is a North Korean diplomat and politician, serving as the Minister of Foreign Affairs of North Korea from April 2014 until May 2016.

Ri has served as a diplomat to Switzerland, and has represented North Korea at the United Nations mission in Geneva. He is the third North Korean foreign minister to speak before the United Nations General Assembly.

== Career ==
Ri was the North Korean representative to the United Nations mission in Geneva in the 1980s. Ri was the North Korean ambassador to Switzerland in the 1990s. Before holding these posts he had worked in African embassies of North Korea. Ri was the vice-director of the Organization and Guidance Department in 2002.

Ri was the Minister of Foreign Affairs of North Korea from April 2014 to May 2016. He was appointed to the post in the first session of the 13th Supreme People's Assembly in 2014, replacing Pak Ui-chun. Outside observers hailed the appointment as the most important in the cabinet, suggesting his close relationship with Kim Jong Un and Kim Yo Jong played part. It was also suggested that this may indicate change in the traditionally weak role of the Foreign Minister in North Korea.

In 2014, Ri attended the United Nations General Assembly (UNGA) at the time when the United Nations Commission of Inquiry (COI) on Human Rights in the Democratic People's Republic of Korea was being discussed. Ri was the first North Korean foreign minister to attend the UNGA in 15 years (and only the third ever, since Kim Yong-nam in 1992 and Paek Nam-sun in 1999), signifying that North Korea took the allegations made by the COI very seriously. Ri attended the UNGA again in 2015 to mark the 70th anniversary session of the UNGA. In his statement to the assembly, described as unsurprising, Ri called for the United States to work toward a peace treaty in Korea in exchange for "dramatic improvement" in security of the Korean peninsula.

In April 2014, Ri was also the first North Korean foreign minister to visit India in at least 25 years. He met with Indian foreign minister Sushma Swaraj to discuss North Korean nuclear program and regional security issues. Ri also met with Indian Vice President Hamid Ansari. It is also possible that Ri sought Indian economic aid, or increased trade. India had given 1 million U.S. dollars as emergency aid through World Food Programme in 2011.

In May 2016, Ri Su-yong was replaced by Ri Yong-ho as the foreign minister. The shuffle was followed by the 7th Congress of the Workers' Party of Korea, which elected Ri Su-yong a full member and Vice Chairman of the 7th Central Committee of the Workers' Party of Korea, a full member of the Politburo of the Workers' Party of Korea, and the director of the party's International Relations Department. He was also appointed to the State Affairs Commission. In 2017, he was elected chairman of the Diplomatic Commission of the Supreme People's Assembly.

He was replaced by Kim Hyong-jun in his diplomatic responsibilities between late 2019 and 2020, and removed from the Politburo and the State Affairs Commission.

== Personal life ==
Ri was born on 15 June 1940 in Kankyōnan Province, Korea, Empire of Japan (now South Hamgyong Province, North Korea). He studied at the University of International Affairs, studying at the department of French language. Ri has a reputation of being innovative, open-minded and result-oriented among those he has worked with.

Ri had been Kim Jong Il's classmate. During his career, Ri took care of many personal and financial affairs of Kim, including his Swiss bank accounts. Ri also guarded Kim's children: Kim Jong Un, the present leader of North Korea, and Kim's sister Kim Yo Jong when the two were studying at an international school in Switzerland. Ri received the Order of Kim Jong Il on 14 February 2012.

== See also ==
- Foreign relations of North Korea
- Human rights in North Korea
- North Korea and the United Nations
- List of diplomatic missions of North Korea

== Notes ==
Political offices
Preceded by Pak Ui-chun	Minister of Foreign Affairs; 2014–2016	Succeeded by Ri Yong-ho
Government offices
New title	Chairman of the Supreme People's Assembly Foreign Affairs Committee; 2017–2020	Succeeded by Kim Hyong-jun
Party political offices
Preceded by Kang Sok-ju	Director of the Workers' Party of Korea International Relations Department; 2016–2019	Succeeded by Kim Hyong-jun
