= Supreme People's Assembly =

Unicameral legislature of North Korea

Coordinates: 39°01′43″N 125°44′59″E

Supreme People's Assembly of Democratic People's Republic of Korea 최고인민회의
- 15th Supreme People's Assembly

Type
- Type: Unicameral

History
- Founded: 10 July 1948; 78 years ago
- Preceded by: People's Assembly of North Korea

Leadership
- SPA Standing Committee Chairman and SPA Chairman: Vacant since 22 June 2026
- SPA Standing Committee Vice Chairmen and SPA Vice Chairmen: Kim Hyong-sik since 22 March 2026

Structure
- Seats: 687
- Political groups: Workers' Party and allies (687): WPK (671); Social organizations (10); Friendly parties and religious organizations (Note: Friendly parties of the WPK are the Korean Social Democratic Party and the Chondoist Chongu Party) (6)
- Committees: Foreign Affairs Committee; Budget Committee; Legislation Committee; Deputy Credentials Committee; Standing Committee

Elections
- Voting system: Approval voting for single party-nominated candidate
- First election: 25 August 1948
- Last election: 15 March 2026

Meeting place
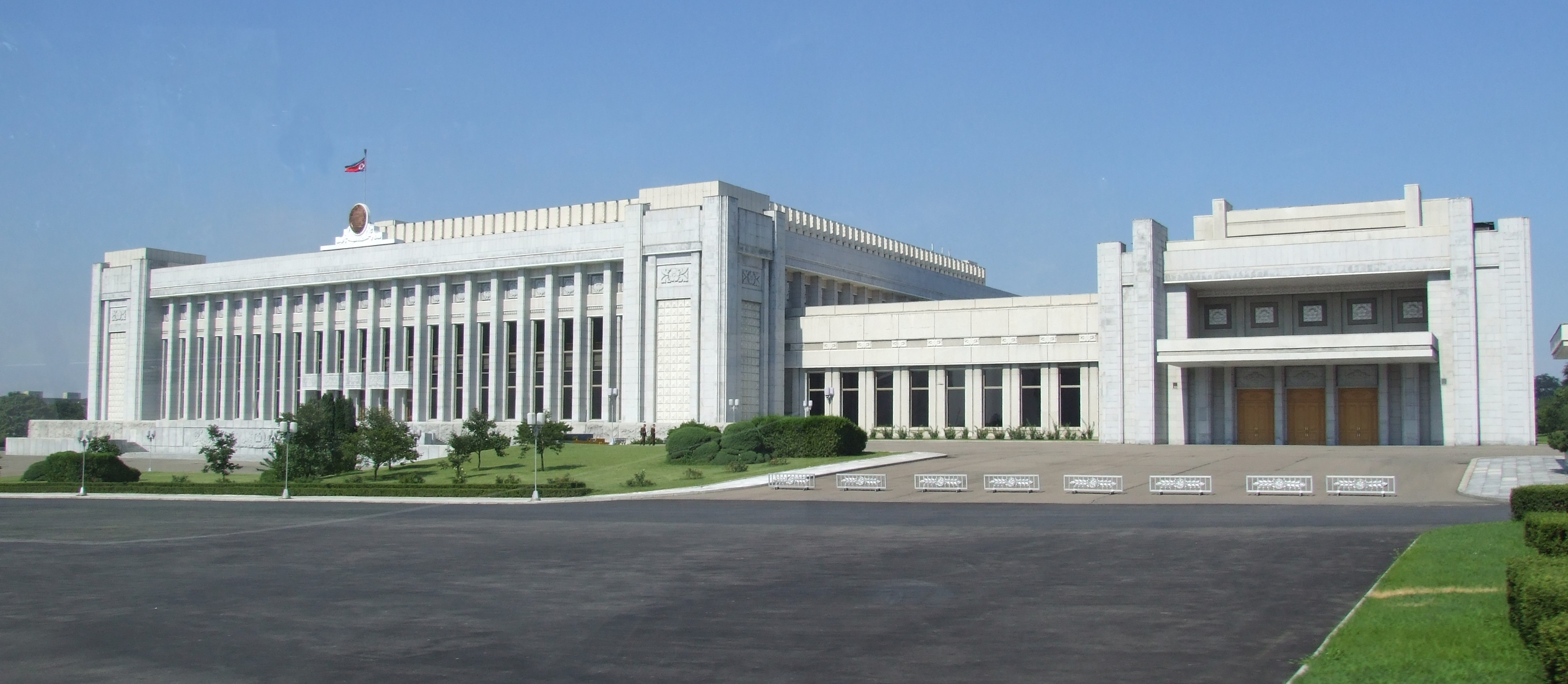
- Pyongyang Assembly Hall; Pyongyang; Democratic People's Republic of Korea

- Supreme People's Assembly
- Hangul: 최고인민회의
- Hanja: 最高人民會議
- RR: Choego inmin hoeui
- MR: Ch'oego inmin hoeŭi

The Supreme People's Assembly (SPA; Korean: 최고인민회의) is the highest state organ of power of the Democratic People's Republic of Korea (DPRK) according to the country's Constitution. Under the principle of unified power, it is the only branch of government in North Korea, with all state organs subservient to it. In form and function, it parallels the legislature in other countries.

The constitution defines the position of the SPA as central in the country's system, with all institutions and offices - President of the State Affairs, State Affairs Commission, Cabinet, Supreme Court, and Supreme Public Prosecutor's Office, elected by it.

SPA adopts only a minority of laws, with the most legislative work instead performed by a smaller Standing Committee, which is defined by the Constitution as its permanent organ. The Chairman of the SPA Standing Committee was the country's ceremonial head of state until 2019, and still performs certain activities such as receiving letters of credence from foreign envoys.

The SPA is convened once or twice a year in regular plenary sessions of several days each. The Standing Committee exercises power when the SPA is in recess, which occurs during all but a few days of every year.

The SPA consists of one deputy from each of North Korea's 687 constituencies, elected to five-year terms. The Workers' Party of Korea, which the constitution recognizes as the state's leading party, dominates the Assembly in a monopoly coalition with the Social Democratic Party and the Chondoist Chongu Party. Elections are usually held in five-year intervals; the most recent one was in 2026.

== History ==
After the defeat of Japan in the Second World War and Liberation of Korea in the North by Soviet forces, the Provisional People's Committee of North Korea organized elections for the provincial, city, county people's committees in late 1946 and early 1947, cementing dominance of the emerging Workers Party of Korea in the North, as between 65% and 83% of members of each committee were members of the communist party.

On 17 February 1947, representatives from the provincial, city and county people's committees met in Pyongyang to form the People's Assembly of North Korea with the power of "highest organ of state sovereignty", which was empowered to act until the reunification.

After the foundation of the Republic of Korea in the South, the North Korean authorities called for the elections for the first Supreme People's Assembly in 1948 in both the North and the South, with the southern elections claimed to have been held underground. The Supreme People's Assembly proclaimed the birth of the Democratic People's Republic of Korea on 9th September, 1948.

The Supreme People's Assembly adopted the first constitution of North Korea in 1948, which was modelled on the Soviet Constitution. The Constitution designated the Supreme People's Assembly as the highest organ of state sovereignty. Under the 1948 Constitution, the Assembly size was mandated on the rule of 1 deputy representing 50,000 people.

Under the 1972 Constitution, the number of seats in the Assembly was 655. This was increased to 687 following the 1986 election.

In 1990, the composition of the SPA was 601 seats held by the Workers' Party of Korea, 51 seats held by the Korean Social Democratic Party, 22 seats held by the Chondoist Chongu Party and 13 seats held by independents.

The last convention during Kim Il Sung's government took place in April 1994, three months before his death. Then during the mourning period the assembly did not meet, nor did elections take place. The next meeting convened in September 1998, four years after Kim's death.

Kim Jong Il did not make a speech at the first session of the 10th SPA in 1998. Instead, members listened to a tape-recorded speech of the late Kim Il Sung, which was made at the first session of the 9th SPA, in 1991. The enhanced status of the Korean People's Army was anticipated by the SPA election July 1998, when 101 military officials were elected out of 687 delegates. This was a large increase from the 57 military officials elected during the 9th SPA in 1990.

Kim Yong-nam served as Chairman of the SPA Presidum from 1998 until 2019.

On April 14, 2012, during the fifth session of the 12th Supreme People's Assembly Kim Jong Un was elected as the country's supreme leader. Addressing the SPA session, Kim Yong-nam, chairman of the SPA Presidium, said Kim's accession to North Korea's top post reflected "the ardent desire and unanimous will of all the party members, servicepersons and other people". His status as leader was reaffirmed when he was elected unopposed on March 9, 2014. Kim was nominated to represent his district, the symbolic Mount Paektu, in the assembly election. Voters could vote yes or no, with all voting in the affirmative, according to government officials.

In 2017, the assembly created a subordinate Diplomatic Commission, which had use in terms of dialogue with international parliaments. On 11 April 2019, Choe Ryong-hae was appointed chairman of the Presidium. In March 2026 during the first session of the 15th Supreme People's Assembly, Jo Yong-won replaced him till June that year, since which the position is vacant until a new chairman will be apppinted during the next session of the SPA.

=== Tenures ===
Term	Deputies	Start	End	Duration
1st	572	2 September 1948	18 September 1957	9 years, 16 days
2nd	215	18 September 1957	22 October 1962	5 years, 34 days
3rd	383	22 October 1962	14 December 1967	5 years, 53 days
4th	457	14 December 1967	12 December 1972	4 years, 364 days
5th	541	12 December 1972	15 December 1977	5 years, 3 days
6th	579	15 December 1977	5 April 1982	4 years, 111 days
7th	615	5 April 1982	29 December 1986	4 years, 268 days
8th	655	29 December 1986	24 May 1990	3 years, 146 days
9th	687	24 May 1990	5 September 1998	8 years, 104 days
10th	687	5 September 1998	3 September 2003	4 years, 363 days
11th	687	3 September 2003	9 April 2009	5 years, 218 days
12th	687	9 April 2009	9 April 2014	5 years, 0 days
13th	687	9 April 2014	11 April 2019	5 years, 2 days
14th	687	11 April 2019	22 March 2026	6 years, 345 days
15th	687	22 March 2026	Incumbent	238 days

== Elections and membership ==
Under the Constitution of North Korea, all citizens 17 and older, regardless of party affiliation, political views, or religion, are eligible to be elected to the legislature and vote in elections. The SPA consists of one deputy from each of North Korea's 687 constituencies, elected to five-year terms.

In principle, in every election there is one candidate per a single constituency, with the turnover rate and the rate of voters voting in favour being extremely high, often above 99%. The official stance is that the candidates are drawn from the working masses, personnel of the Korean People's Army, and all those who follow the supreme leader's revolution. A voter may cross off the candidate's name to vote against them, but must do so in a special booth without any secrecy. The voter must then drop their ballot into a separate box for "no" votes. Voting against the candidate is considered treasonous; those who do face the loss of their jobs and housing, along with extra surveillance. Refusing to vote at all is also considered a treasonous act.

Before its abolition, all candidates were selected by the Democratic Front for the Reunification of Korea in mass meetings held to decide which candidates will be nominated and their names can only go on the ballot paper with the approval of the meeting. The Democratic Front for the Reunification of Korea was a popular front dominated by the Workers' Party of Korea. The other participants in the coalition include the two other de facto legal political parties, the Korean Social Democratic Party and the Chondoist Chongu Party, as well as various other member organizations including social groups and youth groups, such as the Korean Children's Union, the Socialist Patriotic Youth League, the Korean Democratic Women's League, and the Red Cross Society of the Democratic People's Republic of Korea.

== Functions ==
While the Supreme People's Assembly is vested with great powers by the Constitution, in practice the principles of democratic centralism leave it with little real power. Like most parliaments in Communist states, in its legislative role, it does little more than give legal sanction to decisions already made by the supreme leader and the top leadership.

The Assembly is convened once or twice a year in regular plenary sessions of several days each. At all other times, the Standing Committee acts in place of the Supreme People's Assembly. Extraordinary sessions of the Assembly can also meet when called by the Standing Committee or by one third of the Assembly deputies.

The functions of the SPA are, as amended:

- Adopting, amending or supplementing enactments to the Constitution;
- enact, amend and supplement statutory legislation,
- approve major statutory laws adopted by the SPA Standing Committee while the SPA is not in session
- establish the basic principles of the state's domestic and foreign policies
- Determining State policy and the national budget;
- Elections of the President, vice-presidents and members of the State Affairs Commission;
- Elections of the chairperson, vice chairpersons and other members of the Standing Committee;
- Elections of legal officials;
- Appointing the Premier, First Deputy Premier, Deputy Premiers and other members of the Cabinet
- Receiving reports and adopting measures on the Cabinet, its ministries and agencies of ministerial status and ministerial level positions
- Elect or recall the chief justice of the Supreme Court
- Elect or recall the prosecutor general of the Supreme General Prosecutor's Office

Constitutional amendments require the approval of two-thirds of the deputies of the Assembly in plenary session.

== Standing Committee ==
The Standing Committee of the Supreme People's Assembly is the standing organ that exercises power when the SPA is in recess, which occurs during all but a few days of every year.

The Standing Committee consists of the Chairman, vice-chairmen, a secretary-general and other members, elected by the SPA. The secretary-general, a largely symbolic role, is currently Jong Yong-guk. The functions of the Standing Committee are to:

- Convene sessions of the Supreme People's Assembly;
- Examine and approve new state legislation when the SPA is in recess;
- Supervise the Central Public Prosecutors Office of North Korea when the SPA is not in session;
- Supervise the Central Court when the SPA is in recess;
- Interpret and enact the Constitution and most legislation passed, with the President of the State Affairs Commission currently having the power to enact important laws presented for legislation and holding veto power over them;
- Form or dissolve state ministries;
- Supervise laws of State agencies, ministries and other organs;
- Supervise the parliamentary committees of the SPA;
- Organize the national level elections to the SPA;
- Ratify treaties with foreign countries;
- Appoint, transfer, or remove officials and judges when the SPA is in recess and recommend to the President of the SAC for the removal of officials and deputies of the SPA (standing committee inclusive) in serious cases;
- and grant special pardons or amnesties with the concurrence of the President of the SAC.

In addition to its executive functions, the Standing Committee also received credentials of diplomatic representatives from foreign countries with the consent of the President of the SAC, but these powers were transferred to the SAC President in 2026.

In 1998, a constitutional amendment abolished the posts of the President of North Korea, Central People's Committee, and Standing Committee of the Supreme People's Assembly and gave their powers to a new body titled the Presidium of the Supreme People's Assembly. Of these organs, the Presidium was seen as the successor of the Standing Committee. In 2021, the Presidium reverted its name back to Standing Committee, though the powers provided by the original constitutional amendment used to abolish the previous Standing Committee remain unaltered. Thus, the Standing Committee formed in 2021 currently serves as a continuation of the Presidium rather than a re-creation of the Standing Committee that had existed before 1998.

Standing Committee Members
Position	Name	Ref
Chairman	Vacant	
Vice Chairman	Vacant	
Vice Chairman	Thae Hyong-chol	
Secretary General	Jong Yong-guk	
Member	Kim Yong-chol	
Member	Ju Yong-gil	
Member	Kim Chang-yop	
Member	Chang Chun-sil	
Member	Kang Myong-chol	
Member	Kang Su-rin	
Member	Pak Myong-chol	
Member	Kim Nung-o	
Member	Kang Ji-yong	
Member	Ri Myong-gil	
Member	Ri Chol	

=== Chairman ===
Prior to the creation of the post of President of North Korea in 1972, the Chairman of the Standing Committee was the country's de jure head of state. Currently, the Chairman of the Supreme People's Assembly is the SPA speaker, while the Chairman of the Standing Committee performs certain representative functions ordinarily accorded to a head of state. As the representative of the state in external matters and the head of the highest sovereign organ, the Chairman of the Standing Committee is often considered the de facto head of state of North Korea, though officially this role is reserved for the President of the State Affairs Commission. The chairman also convenes sessions of the SPA.

The chairman, like the rest of the Standing Committee, is elected by the SPA, which can also remove the chairman. Choe Ryong-hae assumed the office of Chairman of the Presidium of the Supreme People's Assembly in 2019 before the office was given the current name in 2021.

== Committees ==
In addition to the Standing Committee, the SPA has four parliamentary committees: the Foreign Affairs Committee, Budget Committee, Legislation Committee, and Deputy Credentials Committee. The constitution mandates the Legislation and Budget Committees and leaves the choice of having more committees to the SPA. Before 1998, there was an additional committee called the Reunification-policy Deliberation Committee. The Foreign Affairs Committee, too, was discontinued in 1998, but as of 2019 is operating again.

Committee chairman and members
Committee	Chairman	Other members	Refs.
Foreign Affairs Committee	Kim Hyong-jun	Ro Ryong-nam; Ri Son-gwon; Kim Jong-suk; Kim Tong-son; Choe Son-hui; Kim Song-il	
Budget Committee	O Su-yong	Hong So-hon; Pak Hyong-ryol; Ri Hi-yong; Kim Kwang-uk; Choe Yong-il; Ri Kum-ok	
Legislation Committee	Choe Pu-il	Kim Myong-gil; Kang Yun-sok; Pak Jong-nam; Kim Yong-bae; Jong Kyong-il; Ho Kwang-il	
Deputy Credentials Committee	Kim Phyong-hae	—N/a	

== Results ==
=== 1948 North Korean parliamentary election (first) ===
Party or alliance		Seats
Fatherland Front	Workers' Party of North Korea	157
Fatherland Front	Chondoist Chongu Party	35
Fatherland Front	Korean Democratic Party	35
Fatherland Front	Laboring People's Party	20
Fatherland Front	People's Republic Party	20
Fatherland Front	Democratic Independent Party	20
Fatherland Front	Other parties	171
Fatherland Front	Independents	114
Total		572

=== 2026 North Korean parliamentary election (latest) ===
Party	Votes	%	Seats
Workers' Party of Korea		99.93	671
Social organizations		99.93	10
Friendly parties and religious organizations (Note: Friendly parties of the WPK are the Korean Social Democratic Party and the Chondoist Chongu Party)		99.93	6
Against		0.07	–
Total			687
Registered voters/turnout		99.99	
Source: Korean Central News Agency

== See also ==
- Politics of North Korea
- List of legislatures by country
- National Assembly, the South Korean legislature
