= An Jong-su =

North Korean politician

- Hangul: 안정수
- Hanja: 安正洙
- RR: An Jeongsu
- MR: An Chŏngsu

An Jong-su (Korean: 안정수; born 1951) is a North Korean politician. He is a Vice Chairman of the Workers' Party of Korea (WPK) and the director of the Light Industry Department of the WPK.

An is said to have close ties with Pak Pong-ju and Kim Kyong-hui.

== See also ==
- Politics of North Korea
