= Kim Hyong-jun =

North Korean politician and diplomat (born 1949)

- 김형준
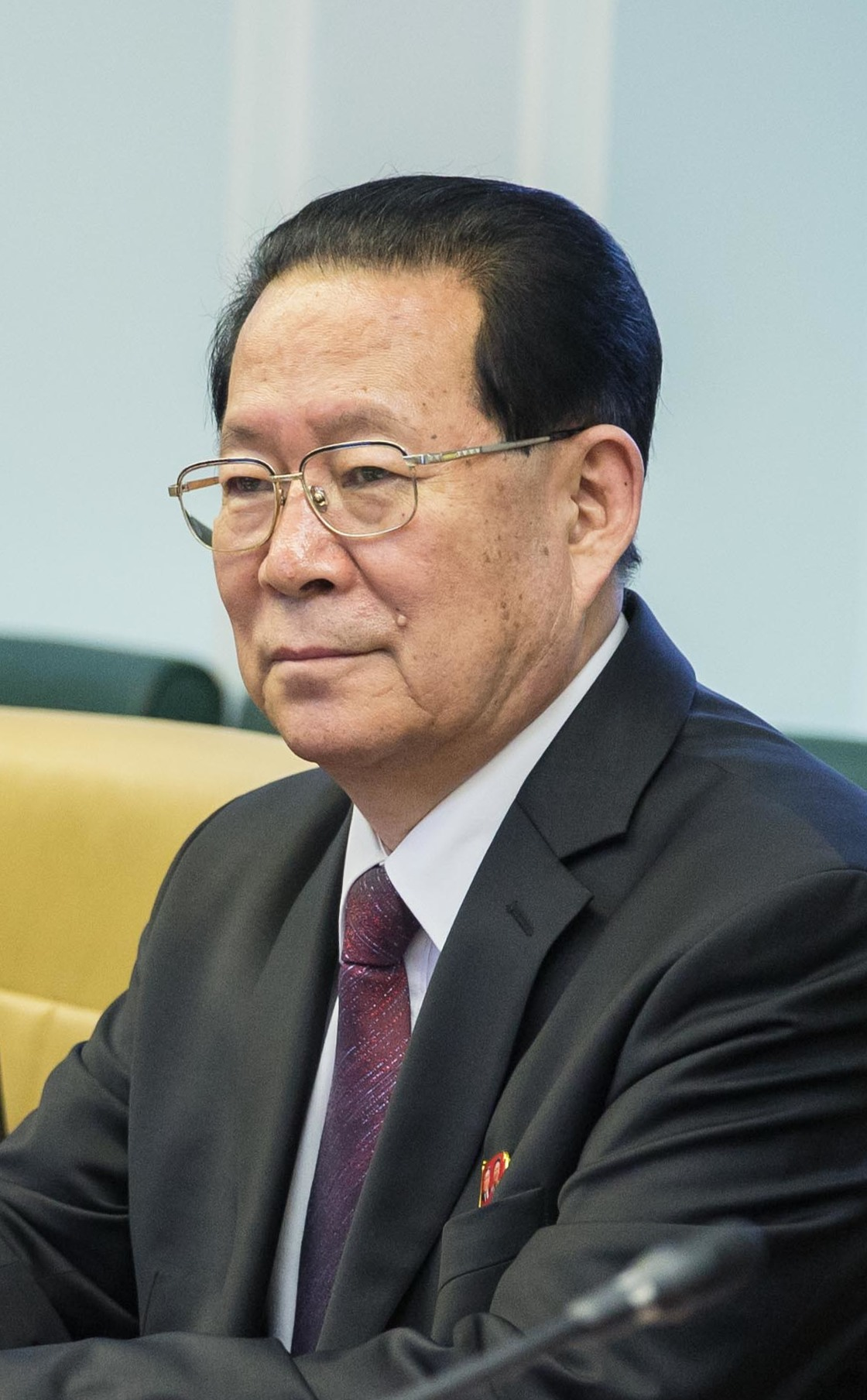
- Kim Hyong-jun (2019)

Chairman of the Supreme People's Assembly Foreign Affairs Committee

14th term
- In office 12 April 2020 – 30 September 2021
- Leader: Kim Jong Un
- Presidium Chairman: Choe Ryong-hae
- Assembly Chairman: Pak Thae-song
- Preceded by: Ri Su-yong

Personal details
- Born: 26 November 1949 (age 76) North Hamgyong Province, North Korea
- Party: Workers' Party of Korea
- Education: Kim Il Sung University

Kim Hyong-jun (Korean: 김형준, Russian: Ким Хён Джун; born November 26, 1949) is a North Korean politician and diplomat. Vice Chairman of the Workers' Party of Korea, member of the Politburo, member of the State Affairs Commission of North Korea, and former Ambassador to the Russian Federation.

== Biography ==
He was born in North Hamgyong Province. He served as Ambassador to Lebanon since 2000. After that, he served as ambassador to Syria and resident in Damascus and Ambassador to Kuwait, Ambassador to Jordan, Ambassador to Qatar, and Ambassador to Bahrain. In January 2005, appointed foreign secretary. On October 29, 2013, he visited China by Koryo Air. In August, 2014 Ambassador to Russia.

On January 1, 2020, North Korean news agency reported that significant personnel affairs of key officials and party vice-chairmen took place at the end of 2019 at the General Assembly of the Korean Labor Party Central Committee. He was appointed Ambassador to Russia on August 28, 2014 and served in that position until 2019, he coordinated the first meeting between General Secretary Kim Jong Un and the Russian president, Vladimir Putin in April 2019, was also nominated as a candidate for political affairs by being appointed the party's vice chairman and the party's international director. He is in charge of foreign affairs at the party and is expected to strengthen relations with Russia. In March 2020 he was seen voting in a meeting of the Politburo, a right reserved for full members only, and thus it was assumed he has become a full member. He was elected as a member of the State Affairs Commission at the 3rd meeting of the 14th convocation of the Supreme People's Assembly on April 12, 2020.

In September 2021, at the fifth session of the 14th Supreme People's Assembly of North Korea, he was removed from his posts as a member of the State Affairs Council and chairman of the Foreign Affairs Committee of the Supreme People's Assembly.

He is a member of the 14th Supreme People's Assembly of North Korea.
