= Ho Chol-man =

North Korean politician

- 허철만

Alternate member of the WPK Politburo
- Incumbent
- Assumed office December 31, 2020
- Supreme Leader: Kim Jong Un

Personal details
- Party: Workers' Party of Korea

Military service
- Allegiance: North Korea

Ho Chol-man (Korean: 허철만) is a North Korean politician. At the 5th Plenary Meeting of the 7th Central Committee of the WPK held on December 31, 2019, he was elected as a candidate (alternate) member of the Politburo of the Workers' Party of Korea.
