= O Su-yong =

North Korean politician

Secretary of the North Hamgyong Province WPK Committee
- In office 2010–2014
- Supreme Leader: Kim Jong Il (2010–2011); Kim Jong Un (2011–2014)
- Preceded by: Hong Sok-hyong
- Succeeded by: Jon Sung-hun

Personal details
- Born: 1944 (age 81–82)
- Citizenship: North Korean
- Party: Workers' Party of Korea

Korean name
- Hangul: 오수용
- Hanja: 吳羞容
- RR: O Suyong
- MR: O Suyong

O Su-yong (Korean: 오수용; born 1944) is a North Korean politician. He was a Vice Chairman of the Workers' Party of Korea (WPK) and the director of the Economic Affairs Department of the WPK.

== Biography ==
O Su-yong was born in 1944. In 1988, he was appointed to the Electronic Automation Industry Committee under the State Administration Council. In September 1998, he became the Vice Minister of Metals and Machine Building Industry. He was then promoted to Minister of Electronic Industry in December 1999.

In April 2009, he resigned as Minister of Electronic Industry and was appointed a Vice Premier of the cabinet. He resigned as Vice Premier in June 2010 and was appointed Chief Secretary of the North Hamgyong Province Workers' Party of Korea (WPK) Provincial Committee from July of the same year. He was replaced by Jon Sung-hun in 2014.

In September 2010, O was elected to the 6th convocation of the Central Committee of the WPK.
