= Ri Hi-yong =

North Korean politician

- 리히용
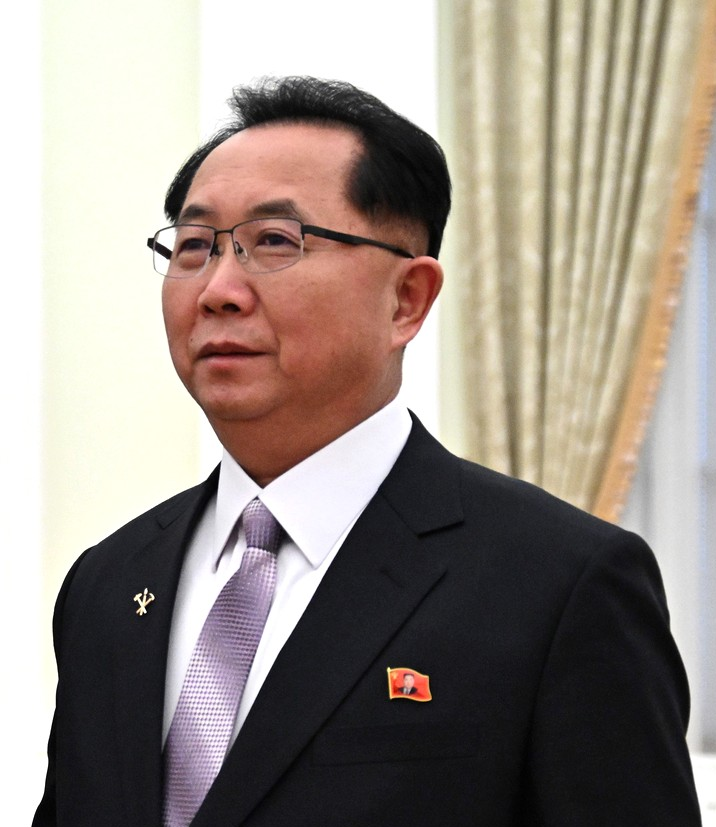

Chairman of the WPK North Hamgyong Provincial Committee
- Incumbent
- Assumed office October 7, 2014
- Supreme Leader: Kim Jong Un
- Preceded by: Jon Sung-hun

Personal details
- Born: North Korea
- Party: Workers' Party of Korea

Ri Hi-yong (Korean: 리히용) is a North Korean politician. He is a member of the Politburo of the Central Committee of the Workers' Party of Korea and Chairman of the Party Committee of North Hamgyong Province.

== Biography ==
After deputy Chairman of the WPK North Hamgyong Provincial Committee, on October 7, 2014, he was elected a member of the Central Committee of the Party and Chairman of the WPK North Hamgyong Provincial Committee. In December 2024, he was appointed Secretary of the Workers' Party of Korea and Head of the Cadre Department.
