= 8th Politburo of the Workers' Party of Korea =

The 8th Politburo of the Workers' Party of Korea, officially the Political Bureau of the 8th Central Committee of the Workers' Party of Korea (Korean: 제8기 조선로동당 중앙위원회 정치국), was elected on 11 January 2021 by the 1st Plenary Session of the 8th Central Committee during the 8th WPK Congress.

== Meetings ==
- 1st Meeting: 4 June 2021
- 2nd Enlarged Meeting: 29 June 2021
- 3rd Enlarged Meeting: 2 September 2021
- 5th Meeting: 1 December 2021
- 6th Meeting: 19 January 2022
- 8th Meeting: 12 May 2022
- Consultative Meeting: 14 May 2022
- Consultative Meeting: 15 May 2022
- Consultative Meeting: 21 May 2022
- Consultative Meeting: 29 May 2022
- 9th Meeting: 7 June 2022
- 10th Meeting: 25 September 2022
- 11th Meeting: 30 November 2022
- 12th Meeting: 30 December 2022
- 13th Meeting: 5 February 2023
- 14th Meeting: 1 March 2023
- 15th Meeting: 18 June 2023
- 16th Meeting: 20 September 2023
- 17th Meeting: 1 December 2023
- 18th Meeting: 30 December 2023
- 19th Enlarged Meeting: 23–24 January 2024
- 20th Meeting: 24 May 2024
- 21st Meeting: 1 July 2024
- 22nd Emergency Enlarged Meeting: 29–30 July 2024
- 24th Meeting: 27 December 2024
- 25th Meeting: 23 June 2025
- 27th Meeting: 7 February 2026

== Composition ==
=== Members ===
The following were elected as members of the 8th Politburo.

The names of members are listed according to the order of their election at the 1st plenary meeting of the 8th Central Committee. Members who have an en dash (—) in the Rank column were by-elected during the term of the 8th Central Committee.

Rank	Name	Korean	7th (Note: Status in the Politburo at the end of the 7th Central Committee's term.)	9th (Note: Status in the Politburo at the start of the 9th Central Committee's term.)
1	Kim Jong Un	김정은	Member	Member
2	Choe Ryong-hae	최룡해	Member	No
3	Ri Pyong-chol	리병철	Member	No
4	Kim Tok-hun	김덕훈	Member	Member
5	Jo Yong-won	조용원	Alternate	Member
6	Pak Thae-song (Note: Pak Thae-song was recalled as a member in February 2021. He returned as a member by being directly by-elected on 8 June 2022.)	박태성	No	Member
7	Pak Jong-chon (Note: Pak Jong-chon was recalled as a member on 29 June 2021. He returned as a member by being directly by-elected on 28 December 2023.)	박정천	Member	No
8	Jong Sang-hak (Note: Jong Sang-hak was recalled as a member on 8 June 2022.)	정상학	No	No
9	Ri Il-hwan	리일환	Member	Member
10	Kim Tu-il (Note: Kim Tu-il was recalled as a member on 11 February 2021.)	김두일	No	No
11	Choe Sang-gon (Note: Choe Sang-gon was recalled as a member on 29 June 2021.)	최상건	No	No
12	Kim Jae-ryong	김재룡	Member	Member
13	O Il-jong (Note: O Il-jong was recalled as a member on 12 May 2022.)	오일정	No	No
14	Kim Yong-chol (Note: Kim Yong-chol was recalled as a member on 28 December 2022.)	김영철	Member	No
15	O Su-yong (Note: O Su-yong was recalled as a member on 8 June 2022. He returned as a member by being directly by-elected on 18 June 2023.)	오수용	Member	No
16	Kwon Yong-jin (Note: Kwon Yong-jin was recalled as a member on 8 June 2022.)	권영진	No	No
17	Kim Jong-gwan (Note: Kim Jong-gwan was recalled as a member on 29 June 2021. He returned as a member by being directly by-elected on 24 December 2024.)	김정관	Alternate	Member
18	Jong Kyong-thaek	정경택	Alternate	Member
19	Ri Yong-gil (Note: Ri Yong-gil was recalled as a member on 28 December 2023. He returned as a member by being by-elected on 24 December 2024, from alternate members.)	리영길	No	Alternate
—	Ri Son-gwon (Note: Ri Son-gwon was by-elected as a member on 11 February 2021, from alternate members, but was recalled on 29 June 2021.)	리선권	Alternate	No
—	Thae Hyong-chol (Note: Thae Hyong-chol was by-elected as a member on 18 June 2021, from alternate members, but was recalled on 8 June 2022.)	태형철	Member	No
—	Pak Jong-gun (Note: Pak Jong-gun was by-elected as a member on 31 December 2021, from alternate members.)	박정근	No	Member
—	Jon Hyon-chol (Note: Jon Hyon-chol was by-elected as a member on 8 June 2022, from alternate members, but was recalled on 18 June 2023. He returned as a member by being directly by-elected on 28 December 2023.)	전현철	No	Alternate
—	Ri Thae-sop (Note: Ri Thae-sop was by-elected as a member on 8 June 2022, from alternate members, but was recalled on 28 December 2022.)	리태섭	No	No
—	Pak Su-il (Note: Pak Su-il was by-elected as a member on 28 December 2022, from alternate members, but was recalled on 28 December 2023.)	박수일	No	No
—	Kang Sun-nam (Note: Kang Sun-nam was by-elected as a member on 18 June 2023, from alternate members, but was recalled on 24 December 2024.)	강순남	No	No
—	Jo Chun-ryong (Note: Jo Chun-ryong was by-elected as a member on 28 December 2023, from alternate members.)	조춘룡	No	Member
—	Choe Son-hui (Note: Choe Son-hui was by-elected as a member on 24 December 2024, from alternate members.)	최선희	No	Member
—	No Kwang-chol (Note: No Kwang-chol was directly by-elected as a member on 24 December 2024.)	노광철	No	Member
—	Ri Hi-yong (Note: Ri Hi-yong was directly by-elected as a member on 24 December 2024.)	리히용	Alternate	Member
—	Choe Tong-myong (Note: Choe Tong-myong was directly by-elected as a member on 24 December 2024.)	최동명	No	No

=== Alternate members ===
The following were elected as alternate members of the 8th Politburo.

The names of alternate members are listed according to the order of their election at the 1st plenary meeting of the 8th Central Committee. Members who have an en dash (—) in the Rank column were by-elected during the term of the 8th Central Committee.

Rank	Name	Korean	7th (Note: Status in the Politburo at the end of the 7th Central Committee's term.)	9th (Note: Status in the Politburo at the start of the 9th Central Committee's term.)
1	Pak Thae-dok (Note: Pak Thae-dok was recalled as an alternate member on 28 December 2022.)	박태덕	Member	No
2	Pak Myong-sun (Note: Pak Myong-sun was recalled as an alternate member on 8 June 2022.)	박명순	Alternate	No
3	Ho Chol-man (Note: Ho Chol-man was recalled as an alternate member on 8 June 2022.)	허철만	Alternate	No
4	Ri Chol-man	리철만	No	Alternate
5	Kim Hyong-sik	김형식	No	No
6	Thae Hyong-chol (Note: Thae Hyong-chol was by-elected as a member on 18 June 2021.)	태형철	Member	No
7	Kim Yong-hwan (Note: Kim Yong-hwan was recalled as an alternate member on 28 December 2022.)	김영환	Alternate	No
8	Pak Jong-gun (Note: Pak Jong-gun was by-elected as a member on 31 December 2021.)	박정근	No	Member
9	Yang Sung-ho	양승호	No	No
10	Jon Hyon-chol (Note: Jon Hyon-chol was by-elected as a member on 8 June 2022.)	전현철	No	Member
11	Ri Son-gwon (Note: Ri Son-gwon was by-elected as a member on 11 February 2021. He returned as an alternate member by being by-elected on 29 June 2021, but was recalled in 2023.)	리선권	Alternate	No
—	Kim Song-nam (Note: Kim Song-nam was by-elected as an alternate member on 11 February 2021.)	김성남	No	Member
—	U Sang-chol (Note: U Sang-chol was by-elected as an alternate member on 18 June 2021, but was recalled on 28 December 2023.)	우상철	No	No
—	Ju Chol-gyu (Note: Ju Chol-gyu was by-elected as an alternate member on 29 June 2021.)	주철규	No	Alternate
—	Yu Jin (Note: Yu Jin was by-elected as an alternate member on 2 September 2021, but was recalled on 8 June 2022.)	유진	No	No
—	Rim Kwang-il (Note: Rim Kwang-il was by-elected as an alternate member on 2 September 2021, but was recalled on 8 June 2022.)	림광일	No	No
—	Jang Jong-nam (Note: Jang Jong-nam was by-elected as an alternate member on 2 September 2021, but was recalled on 31 December 2021.)	장정남	No	No
—	Ri Thae-sop (Note: Ri Thae-sop was by-elected as an alternate member on 31 December 2021, and as a member on 8 June 2022. He returned as an alternate member by being by-elected on 28 December 2022, but was recalled on 24 December 2024.)	리태섭	No	No
—	O Il-jong (Note: O Il-jong was by-elected as an alternate member in May 2022, but was recalled on 28 December 2022.)	오일정	No	No
—	Jo Chun-ryong (Note: Jo Chun-ryong was by-elected as an alternate member on 8 June 2022, and as a member on 28 December 2023.)	조춘룡	No	Member
—	Pak Su-il (Note: Pak Su-il was by-elected as an alternate member on 8 June 2022, and as a member on 28 December 2022.)	박수일	No	No
—	Ri Chang-dae (Note: Ri Chang-dae was by-elected as an alternate member on 8 June 2022.)	리창대	No	Alternate
—	Choe Son-hui (Note: Choe Son-hui was by-elected as an alternate member on 8 June 2022, and as a member on 24 December 2024.)	최선희	No	Member
—	Han Kwang-sang (Note: Han Kwang-sang was by-elected as an alternate member on 8 June 2022.)	한광상	No	Alternate
—	Ju Chang-il (Note: Ju Chang-il was by-elected as an alternate member on 28 December 2022.)	주창일	No	Member
—	Ri Hi-yong (Note: Ri Hi-yong was by-elected as an alternate member on 28 December 2022, but was recalled in May 2024.)	리히용	Alternate	Member
—	Kim Su-gil (Note: Kim Su-gil was by-elected as an alternate member on 28 December 2022.)	김수길	Member	No
—	Kim Sang-gon (Note: Kim Sang-gon was by-elected as an alternate member on 28 December 2022, but was recalled on 28 December 2023.)	김상건	No	No
—	Kang Sun-nam (Note: Kang Sun-nam was by-elected as an alternate member on 28 December 2022, and as a member on 18 June 2023.)	강순남	No	No
—	Kim Yong-chol (Note: Kim Yong-chol was by-elected as an alternate member on 18 June 2023.)	김영철	Member	No
—	Ri Yong-gil (Note: Ri Yong-gil was by-elected as an alternate member on 28 December 2023, and as a member on 24 December 2024.)	리영길	No	Alternate
—	Kim Chol-sam (Note: Kim Chol-sam was by-elected as an alternate member on 28 December 2023, but was recalled on 24 December 2024.)	김철삼	No	No
—	Pang Tu-sop (Note: Pang Tu-sop was by-elected as an alternate member on 24 December 2024.)	방두섭	No	Alternate
—	Kim Chol-won (Note: Kim Chol-won was by-elected as an alternate member on 24 December 2024.)	김철원	No	Alternate
