= 8th Central Military Commission of the Workers' Party of Korea =

The 8th Central Military Commission of the Workers' Party of Korea (Korean: 제8기 조선로동당 중앙군사위원회), officially the Central Military Commission of the 8th Central Committee of the Workers' Party of Korea, was elected at the 1st Plenary Session of the 8th WPK Central Committee in the immediate aftermath of the party's 8th Congress on 10 January 2021. It was composed of one chairman, one vice chairmen and eleven ordinary members.

== Leadership ==
- Chairman: Kim Jong Un
- Vice Chairmen:
  - Ri Pyong-chol, until 29 June 2021, 21 June 2022 – 24 December 2024
  - Pak Jong-chon, 2021 – 28 December 2022, from 30 December 2023
  - Ri Yong-gil, 28 December 2022 – 30 December 2023

== History and meetings ==
During the second quarter of 2025 the 8th Central Military Commission carried out investigation of the May 21 capsizing of a naval destroyer during a commissioning ceremony at Chongjin Port.

- 1st Enlarged Meeting: 24 February 2021
- 2nd Enlarged Meeting: 11 June 2021
- 3rd Enlarged Meeting: 21–23 June 2022
- 4th Enlarged Meeting: 6 February 2023
- 5th Enlarged Meeting: 11 March 2023
- 6th Enlarged Meeting: 10 April 2023
- 7th Enlarged Meeting: 9 August 2023
- 8th Enlarged Meeting: 28 May 2025

== Members ==
The following were elected as members of the 8th Central Military Commission.

The names of members are listed according to the order of their election at the 1st plenary meeting of the 8th Central Committee. Members who have an en dash (—) in the Rank column were by-elected during the term of the 8th Central Committee.

Rank	Name	Korean	7th (Note: Status in the 7th Central Military Commission at the end of its term.)	9th (Note: Status in the 9th Central Military Commission at the start of its term.)
1	Kim Jong Un	김정은	Yes	Yes
2	Ri Pyong-chol (Note: Ri Pyong-chol was recalled as a member on 29 June 2021. He returned as a member by being by-elected on 21 June 2022, but was recalled in 24 December 2024.)	리병철	Yes	No
3	Jo Yong-won	조용원	No	No
4	O Il-jong	오일정	No	No
5	Kim Jo-guk	김조국	Yes	No
6	Kang Sun-nam	강순남	No	No
7	O Su-yong	오수용	No	No
8	Pak Jong-chon (Note: Pak Jong-chon was recalled as a member on 28 December 2022. He returned as a member by being by-elected on 28 December 2023.)	박정천	Yes	No
9	Kwon Yong-jin (Note: Kwon Yong-jin was recalled as a member on 8 June 2022.)	권영진	No	No
10	Kim Jong-gwan (Note: Kim Jong-gwan was recalled as a member on 29 June 2021.)	김정관	No	No
11	Jong Kyong-thaek	정경택	No	Yes
12	Ri Yong-gil	리영길	No	Yes
13	Rim Kwang-il (Note: Rim Kwang-il was recalled as a member on 8 June 2022.)	림광일	Yes	No
—	Ri Thae-sop (Note: Ri Thae-sop was by-elected as a member on 8 June 2022.)	리태섭	No	No
—	Jo Kyong-chol (Note: Jo Kyong-chol was by-elected as a member on 8 June 2022.)	조경철	No	No
—	Pak Su-il (Note: Pak Su-il was by-elected as a member on 8 June 2022.)	박수일	No	No
—	Ri Chang-ho (Note: Ri Chang-ho was by-elected as a member on 8 June 2022.)	리창호	No	Yes
