= 8th Secretariat of the Workers' Party of Korea =

The 8th Secretariat of the Workers' Party of Korea, officially the Secretariat of the 8th Central Committee of the Workers' Party of Korea (Korean: 제8기 조선로동당 중앙위원회 비서국), was elected by the 1st Plenary Session of the 8th Central Committee in the immediate aftermath of the 8th WPK Congress.

== Leadership ==
- General Secretary of the Workers' Party of Korea: Kim Jong Un

== Meetings ==
- Meeting: 12 June 2022
- Enlarged Meeting: 27 June 2022
- 30th Enlarged Meeting: 27 January 2025

== Members ==
The following were elected as members of the 8th Secretariat. The Secretariat is composed of the General Secretary and the secretaries of the Central Committee.

The names of members are listed according to the order of their election at the 1st plenary meeting of the 8th Central Committee. Members who have an en dash (—) in the Rank column were by-elected during the term of the 8th Central Committee.

Rank	Name	Korean	7th EPB (Note: Status in the Executive Policy Bureau at the end of the 7th Central Committee's term.)	9th SEC (Note: Status in the Secretariat at the start of the 9th Central Committee's term.)
1	Kim Jong Un	김정은	Yes	Yes
2	Jo Yong-won	조용원	No	No
3	Pak Thae-song (Note: Pak Thae-song was dismissed as a secretary in February 2021. He was elected again as a secretary on 8 June 2022, but was dismissed on 24 December 2024.)	박태성	No	No
4	Ri Pyong-chol (Note: Ri Pyong-chol was dismissed as a secretary on 29 June 2021.)	리병철	No	No
5	Jong Sang-hak (Note: Jong Sang-hak was dismissed as a secretary on 8 June 2022.)	정상학	No	No
6	Ri Il-hwan	리일환	Yes	Yes
7	Kim Tu-il (Note: Kim Tu-il was dismissed as a secretary on 11 February 2021.)	김두일	No	No
8	Choe Sang-gon (Note: Choe Sang-gon was dismissed as a secretary on 29 June 2021.)	최상건	No	No
—	O Su-yong (Note: O Su-yong was elected as a secretary on 11 February 2021, but was dismissed on 8 June 2022. He was elected again as a secretary on 18 June 2023, but was dismissed on 28 December 2023.)	오수용	No	No
—	Thae Hyong-chol (Note: Thae Hyong-chol was elected as a secretary on 29 June 2021, but was dismissed on 8 June 2022.)	태형철	No	No
—	Pak Jong-chon (Note: Pak Jong-chon was elected as a secretary on 2 September 2021, but was dismissed on 28 December 2022. He was elected again as a secretary in December 2023.)	박정천	No	No
—	Kim Jae-ryong (Note: Kim Jae-ryong was elected as a secretary on 8 June 2022, but was dismissed on 24 December 2024.)	김재룡	Yes	Yes
—	Jon Hyon-chol (Note: Jon Hyon-chol was elected as a secretary on 8 June 2022, but was dismissed on 18 June 2023. He was elected again as a secretary on 28 December 2023, but was dismissed on 24 December 2024.)	전현철	No	No
—	Ri Yong-gil (Note: Ri Yong-gil was elected as a secretary on 28 December 2022, but was dismissed on 28 December 2023.)	리영길	No	No
—	Jo Chun-ryong (Note: Jo Chun-ryong was elected as a secretary on 28 December 2023.)	조춘룡	No	Yes
—	Choe Tong-myong (Note: Choe Tong-myong was elected as a secretary on 24 December 2024.)	최동명	No	No
—	Kim Tok-hun (Note: Kim Tok-hun was elected as a secretary on 24 December 2024.)	김덕훈	No	No
—	Ri Hi-yong (Note: Ri Hi-yong was elected as a secretary on 24 December 2024.)	리히용	No	Yes
