= 7th Central Military Commission of the Workers' Party of Korea =

The 7th Central Military Commission of the Workers' Party of Korea (WPK) (Korean: 제7기 조선로동당 중앙군사위원회) was elected at the 1st Plenary Session of the 7th WPK Central Committee in the immediate aftermath of the party's 7th Congress on 9 May 2016.

== Leadership ==
- Chairman: Kim Jong Un
- Vice Chairman: Ri Pyong-chol, from 23 May 2020

== Meetings ==
- 1st Enlarged Meeting: 17 May 2018
- Emergency Enlarged Meeting: 6 September 2019
- 3rd Enlarged Meeting: 21 December 2019
- 4th Enlarged Meeting: 23 May 2020
- Preliminary Meeting for the 5th Meeting: 23 June 2020
- 5th Enlarged Meeting: 18 July 2020
- 6th Enlarged Meeting: 8 September 2020

== Members ==
Rank	Name	Korean	6th (Note: Status in the 6th Central Military Commission at the end of its term.)	8th (Note: Status in the 8th Central Military Commission at the start of its term.)
1	Kim Jong Un	김정은	Yes	Yes
2	Hwang Pyong-so	황병서	Yes	No
3	Pak Pong-ju	박봉주	No	No
4	Pak Yong-sik	박영식	No	No
5	Ri Myong-su	리명수	Yes	No
6	Kim Yong-chol	김영철	Yes	No
7	Ri Man-gon (Note: Ri Man-gon was recalled as a member. He returned as a member by being by-elected on 10 April 2019.)	리만건	No	No
8	Kim Won-hong	김원홍	Yes	No
9	Choe Pu-il	최부일	Yes	No
10	Kim Kyong-ok	김경옥	Yes	No
11	Ri Yong-gil	리영길	Yes	Yes
12	So Hong-chan	서홍찬	Yes	No
—	Choe Ryong-hae (Note: Choe Ryong-hae was by-elected as a member on 7 October 2017.)	최룡해	Yes	No
—	Ri Pyong-chol (Note: Ri Pyong-chol was by-elected as a member on 7 October 2017.)	리병철	Yes	Yes
—	Jang Kil-song (Note: Jang Kil-song was by-elected as a member on 7 October 2017.)	장길성	No	No
—	Kim Jae-ryong (Note: Kim Jae-ryong was by-elected as a member on 10 April 2019.)	김재룡	No	No
—	Thae Jong-su (Note: Thae Jong-su was by-elected as a member on 10 April 2019.)	태종수	No	Yes
—	Kim Jo-guk (Note: Kim Jo-guk was by-elected as a member on 10 April 2019.)	김조국	No	No
