= Central Military Commission of the Workers' Party of Korea =

North Korean WPK's military organ

- 조선로동당 중앙군사위원회

Agency overview
- Jurisdiction: Korean People's Army; Worker-Peasant Red Guards
- Agency executives: Kim Jong Un, Chairman; Vice Marshal Ri Yong-gil, Vice Chairman; Marshal Ri Pyong-chol, Vice Chairman
- Parent agency: Central Committee of the Workers' Party of Korea

The Central Military Commission of the Workers' Party of Korea (CMC) (Korean: 조선로동당 중앙군사위원회) is an organ of the Central Committee of the Workers' Party of Korea (WPK) which heads the Korean People's Army (KPA).

One of the CMC's primary functions is to authorize defense and munitions spending and product orders, and to determine how natural resources and products from military-controlled production units are earmarked and distributed domestically and for sale abroad. According to the WPK rules, the CMC directs WPK activities in the KPA and is chaired by the WPK General Secretary and the officeholder is also the Commander-in-Chief of North Korea. The CMC relies on a number of organizations to carry out its mandate, including the KPA General Political Bureau, the WPK Military Government Guidance Department, and the WPK Munitions Industry Department (aka Defense Industry Department).

== History ==
The Central Military Commission of the Workers' Party of Korea was established at the 5th plenary meeting of the 4th Central Committee of the Workers' Party of Korea held on 10–14 December 1962. During its establishment, it was a committee subordinate to the WPK Central Committee under the full name Military Committee of the Central Committee of the Workers' Party of Korea.

The committee was organized to its present form at the 6th plenary meeting of the 6th WPK Central Committee held on 29–31 August 1982. An amendment to the WPK charter in 1982 is believed to have made the CMC equal to the Central Committee, enabling it (among other things) to elect the WPK leader. The last public listing of the CMC was at the 21st Plenary Session of the 6th Central Committee in December 1993. By the 3rd Conference, seven of its nineteen 1993 members remained; the other twelve had either died, retired or were purged.

The CMC was revitalized at the 3rd Conference in 2010, with Kim Jong Un and Ri Yong-ho elected as deputy chairmen. Except for his Central Committee membership, this was Kim Jong Un's only title at this time; in many ways, the CMC enabled him to develop a patronage network. New members included Vice Marshal Kim Yong-chun (Minister of People's Armed Forces), General Kim Myong-ruk (Chief of the Operation Bureau of the General Staff), General Ri Pyong-chol (Commander of the Korean People's Air Force), Admiral Jong Myong-do (Commander of the Korean People's Navy), Lieutenant General Kim Yong-chol, Colonel General Choe Kyong-song (heads of the KPA's special forces) General Choe Pu-il and Colonel General Choe Sang-ryo (members of the General Staff). Civilians, such as Jang Song-thaek (head of the Administrative Department), also had seats on the commission. However, the overall authority of the CMC was diluted; it was stripped of its authority to command the KPA.

At the 4th Conference, Choe Ryong-hae was appointed CMC deputy chairman; Vice Marshal Hyon Chol-hae, General Ri Myong-su and Kim Rak-gyom were elected to the commission. Kim Jong Un oversaw the CMC regaining its former power, aiming to bring the KPA firmly under party control; the 8th WPK Congress held in 2021 oversaw the CMC being upgraded to "the party's supreme institution on military guidance", as well as granting it "command over the armed forces of the republic".

== Organization ==
According to the rules of the WPK, the CMC is "the party's supreme institution on military guidance" and has the authority to "command over the armed forces of the republic". The rules also state that WPK General Secretary is chairman of the CMC ex officio. The membership of the CMC is elected by the plenum of the Central Committee. The CMC convenes at least once every six months. Depending on the nature of what is discussed, only necessary members need to participate regardless of the quorum requirement. According to the rules, the CMC is required to "summarize the status of the implementation of the Party’s national defense policy" prior to Central Committee plenums and report them to the plenum.

== Current membership ==
As of 10 January 2021, the Central Military Commission consists of the chairman, vice chairman, and 11 members.

Chairman
Chairman	Other positions
Marshal of the DPRK; Kim Jong Un 김정은 (born 1984)	General Secretary of the Workers' Party of Korea; Politburo Presidium Member; President of the State Affairs Commission; Supreme Commander of the Armed Forces of North Korea
Vice Chairman
Vice Chairman	Other positions
Marshal of the KPA; Ri Pyong-chol 리병철 (born 1948)	Politburo Presidium Member; Secretary of the Central Committee; Member of the State Affairs Commission
Vice Marshal of the KPA; Ri Yong-gil 리영길	Politburo Member
Members
Member	Other positions
Colonel General; Jo Yong-won 조용원	Politburo Presidium Member
Colonel General; O Il-jong 오일정 (born 1954)	Politburo Member; Secretary of the Central Committee; Director of the Military Leadership Department
Kim Jo-guk 김조국	First Vice Department Director of the Central Committee
General; Kang Sun-nam 강순남	Director of the Munitions Industry Department; Minister of Defense
O Su-yong 오수용 (born 1944)	Politburo Member; Chairman of the Second Economic Committee
Marshal of the KPA; Pak Jong-chon 박정천	Politburo Member; Director of the Political-Military Leadership Affairs Department of the Central Committee of the Workers' Party of Korea
Colonel General; Kwon Yong-jin 권영진	Politburo Member; Director of the General Political Bureau of the Korean People's Army
General; Kim Jong-gwan 김정관	Politburo Member; Part of Ministry of Defense leadership
Colonel General; Jong Kyong-thaek 정경택 (born 1961)	Politburo Member; Minister of State Security
General; Rim Kwang-il 림광일 (born 1965)	First Vice Chief of the General Staff of the Korean People's Army; Chief of the Reconnaissance General Bureau

== See also ==
- Central Committee of the Workers' Party of Korea
- Munitions Industry Department of the Workers' Party of Korea
- Central Military Commission (China)
- Central Military Commission of the Communist Party of Vietnam
- National Defence Council of East Germany
