= Hyon Yong-chol =

North Korean general (born 1949), possibly executed in 2015

Vice Marshal Hyon Yong-chol

Minister of Defence
- In office June 12, 2014 – April 2015
- Supreme Leader: Kim Jong Un
- Preceded by: Jang Jong-nam
- Succeeded by: Pak Yong-sik

Vice Chairman of the Central Military Commission
- In office July 26, 2012 – May 24, 2013
- Supreme Leader: Kim Jong Un
- Preceded by: Choe Ryong-hae; Ri Yong-ho
- Succeeded by: Choe Ryong-hae

Chief of the General Staff of the Korean People's Army
- In office July 26, 2012 – May 24, 2013
- Supreme Leader: Kim Jong Un
- Preceded by: Ri Yong-ho
- Succeeded by: Kim Kyok-sik
- Defence Minister: Kim Jong-gak; Kim Kyok-sik; Jang Jong-nam

Personal details
- Born: Hyon Yong-chol; January 11, 1949 Kyongsong County, North Hamgyong Province, North Korea
- Died: April 30, 2015 (aged 66) (rumored) North Korea

Military service
- Allegiance: North Korea
- Branch/service: Korean People's Army
- Rank: Vice Marshal (reportedly demoted to General in November 2012)

- Hyon Yong-chol
- Hangul: 현영철
- Hanja: 玄永哲
- RR: Hyeon Yeongcheol
- MR: Hyŏn Yŏngch'ŏl

Hyon Yong-chol (Korean: 현영철; January 11, 1949 – possibly executed April 30, 2015) was a North Korean general and Workers' Party of Korea (WPK) politician. He served as Minister of Defence from 2014 to 2015. In 2015, he was reportedly removed from his post.

== Personal life and career ==
North Korean media have stated that Hyon was born in January 1949 and joined the military in 1966. Having served as a battalion commander, he was elected a delegate to the Supreme People's Assembly in 2009. Hyon was promoted to the rank of four-star general (대장) alongside Kim Jong Un, Kim Kyong-hui, Kim Kyong-ok, Choe Ryong-hae, and Choe Pu-il in September 2010. He was on the national funeral committee in the wake of Kim Jong Il's death in December 2011. Hyon was named as a member of the Central Committee of the Workers' Party of Korea at the third party conference. In February 2012, Hyon received the Order of Kim Jong Il.

Hyon was promoted to the rank of Vice Marshal (차수) of the Korean People's Army in July 2012, two days after Chief of the General Staff Ri Yong-ho was relieved of his duties. It was initially unclear if Hyon would replace Ri as Chief of the General Staff, but this was confirmed a few days later. He was also identified as vice-chairman of the WPK Central Military Commission on 26 July 2012.

Hyon was reportedly demoted to General in November 2012. On 31 March 2013, Hyon was made a Politburo alternate member, though he did not take Ri Yong-ho's former seat on the Politburo Presidium. He was transferred to command the 5th Army Corps in May 2013. He was called back to Pyongyang in June 2014 to serve as minister of the People's Armed Forces.

== Ouster and rumoured execution ==
South Korea's National Intelligence Service initially reported on May 12, 2015, that Hyon was purged and publicly executed near the end of April 2015 at Kanggon Military Training Area near Pyongyang. It was reported that he was executed – with an anti-aircraft gun – for insubordination and sleeping during formal military rallies, in particular during an event in late April 2015 attended by Kim Jong Un in which Hyon was captured on video napping. A report by CNN indicated that Hyon was accused of treason after he failed to carry out an order by Kim Jong Un, though the nature of this order was not specified. A top official stated that while executions take place for crimes of treason or subversion, Hyon was not among the executed. According to analysts interviewed by BBC News, while reassigning officials was commonplace in North Korea, the execution of a figure as close to Kim Jong Un as Hyon was surprising, and could give cause to concern for the country's stability.

Several hours after the initial report, South Korea's National Intelligence Service revised its statement, saying that although it has intelligence information suggesting that Hyon was executed, it had not been able to verify that. Doubts were raised because footage of Hyon was still being shown on North Korean television. He was also mentioned in the North Korean newspaper Rodong Sinmun the day he was supposed to have been executed. This would imply that he had been arrested and executed on the same day, which is unlikely. In July, official North Korea media named Pak Yong-sik as the armed forces minister, but did not report Hyon's removal. A South Korean spokesman said that reports of Hyon's execution should be taken as rumors until there was definitive evidence.

In April 2015, the US-based Committee for Human Rights in Korea released satellite imagery showing a shooting range lined with anti-aircraft guns apparently primed for an execution the previous October.

Tae Yong-ho, a North Korean diplomat who defected in August 2016 from the North Korean embassy in London, said that Hyon Yong-chol's execution was the result of wiretapped conversations at his home, and that wiretapping high-ranking officials has become the norm.

== Awards and honors ==
The official portrait of Hyon illustrates Hyon wearing all the decorations awarded to him.

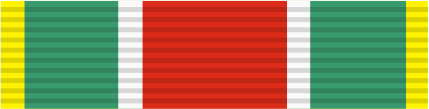

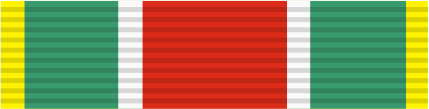

Political offices
| Preceded by Jang Jong-nam | Minister of People's Armed Forces; 2014–2015 | Succeeded by Pak Yong-sik |
Party political offices
| Preceded by Choe Ryong-hae; Ri Yong-ho | Vice Chairman of the Central Military Commission; 2012–2013; Served alongside: Choe Ryong-hae | Succeeded by Choe Ryong-hae |
Military offices
| Preceded by Ri Yong-ho | Chief of the General Staff of the Korean People's Army; 2012–2013 | Succeeded by Kim Kyok-sik |
