= Kim Kyok-sik =

North Korean general (1938–2015)

- Born: 5 October 1938; Chongpyong County, Kankyōnan Province, Korea, Empire of Japan
- Died: 10 May 2015 (aged 76) Pyongyang, North Korea
- Allegiance: North Korea
- Branch: Korean People's Army

Korean name
- Hangul: 김격식
- Hanja: 金格埴
- RR: Gim Gyeoksik
- MR: Kim Kyŏksik

General Kim Kyok-sik (Korean: 김격식; 5 October 1938 – 10 May 2015) was a defence minister of North Korea.

== Biography ==
Kim Kyok-sik was born in 1938. He studied at Kim Il Sung Military Academy before being moved to Syria as North Korea's military attaché in the 1970s, possibly managing support activities for the Eritrean Liberation Front and the Turkish Workers' Party. He was called back to North Korea by the 1980s, serving as an official of the Korean People's Army; he was elected deputy to the Supreme People's Assembly in 1990, appointed member of the 6th Central Committee of the Workers' Party of Korea in 1991, and promoted to colonel-general in 1992. He was given a low-level position in the Kim Il Sung funeral committee in 1994.

Kim was promoted to general in 1997. He received command of the 2nd Army Corps in October 1994 and held it until April 2007, when he was appointed Chief of the General Staff replacing Kim Yong-chun, who had been appointed defence minister. He was succeeded by Ri Yong-ho in February 2009.

Kim was then appointed commander of the 4th Army Corps and is widely believed to have commanded the November 2009 drills near the Northern Limit Line and the November 2010 shelling of Yeonpyeongdo. He was downgraded from full to alternate member of the WPK Central Committee at the Party Conference in September 2010.

Kim was appointed vice-minister of the People's Armed Forces in August 2011 and promoted to minister in November 2012. He was made Politburo alternate member in March 2013.

After six months of service, during which he also oversaw the rising military tensions with South Korea from February to April 2013, Kim—dubbed a hardliner—was unexpectedly replaced as minister by little-known general Jang Jong-nam in May 2013, only to be reappointed Chief of the KPA General Staff. He was replaced again in August after only 3 months, possibly during a meeting of the 6th Central Military Commission on August 25. Reports suggest the seizure of a North Korean arms ship in Panama as the reason behind his removal. He died in 2015 of acute respiratory failure.

== Awards and honors ==
Kim's portrait displays all medals awarded to him.

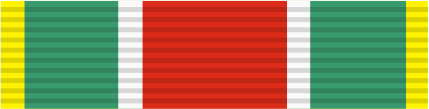

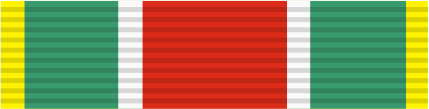

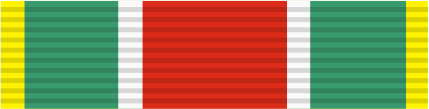

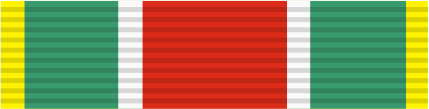

== Works ==
- Kim Kyok-sik (August 1990). "The Labor Movement Growing and Strengthening Rapidly in South Korea and Its Characteristics" (PDF). Kulloja (8). OCLC 9516938.

Political offices
Preceded by Kim Jong-gak	Minister of the People's Armed Forces; 2012–2013	Succeeded by Jang Jong-nam
Military offices
Preceded by Kim Yong-chun	Chief of the General Staff of the Korean People's Army; 2007–2009	Succeeded by Ri Yong-ho
Preceded by Hyon Yong-chol	Chief of the General Staff of the Korean People's Army; 2013	Succeeded by Ri Yong-gil
