= Ri Chang-dae =

North Korean politician

- 김환

Minister of State Security
- Incumbent
- Assumed office June 2022
- Supreme Leader: Kim Jong-un
- Preceded by: Jong Kyong-thaek

Personal details
- Citizenship: North Korean
- Party: Workers' Party of Korea

Military service
- Allegiance: North Korea
- Rank: Colonel general

Ri Chang-dae (Korean: 리창대) is a North Korean politician who is serving as Minister of State Security since June 2022, replacing Jong Kyong-thaek.

== Biography ==
Nothing is known about him prior to his election to the 8th WPK CC, nor is it mentioned in the past in North Korean news, in the list of funeral committee members, or in the general promotion list. Then, in June 2022, at the fifth enlarged plenary meeting of the 8th WPK CC, he was elected as a member of the Central Committee, and was immediately elected as a candidate member of the Politburo. and held the rank of Colonel general (‘’Sangjang’’). On July 26, 2022, he attended a meeting of the 8th Central Military Commission, and the next day, on July 27, during the Day of Victory in the Great Fatherland Liberation War along with Kim Jong-un, he visited the Patriotic Martyrs' Cemetery and the graves of the war veterans of the Fatherland Liberation War. On August 10, he attended the national quarantine emergency meeting. On September 7, he was included in the list of the 7th Session of the 14th Supreme People's Assembly. He attended the 7th National Legal Service meeting held between September 14 and September 15.

Political offices
Preceded by Jong Kyong-thaek	Minister of State Security; June 2022–present	Incumbent
