= Choe Pu-il =

North Korean politician (born 1944)

- 최부일

Chairman of the Supreme People's Assembly Legislation Committee
- Incumbent
- Assumed office 9 April 2014
- Supreme Leader: Kim Jong Un
- Preceded by: Pak Nam-gi

Minister of People's Security
- In office February 2013 – 13 February 2020
- Succeeded by: Kim Jong-ho

Personal details
- Born: March 6, 1944 (age 82) Hoeryong, North Hamgyong Province, North Korea
- Party: Workers' Party of Korea

Korean name
- Hangul: 최부일
- Hanja: 崔富日
- RR: Choe Buil
- MR: Ch'oe Puil

General Choe Pu-il (Korean: 최부일; born 6 March 1944) is a North Korean politician who served as head of North Korea's Ministry of People's Security.

== Biography ==
In April 1992, he was promoted to major general and to general in October 1995. After serving as Deputy Chief of the General Staff in the Korean People's Army, he served as First Deputy Chief of Staff and Chief of Operations of the General Staff. He became a member of the Central Military Commission of the Party at the 3rd Conference of the Workers' Party of Korea held in September 2010. In the same month, along with Kim Jong Un, Kim Kyong-hui, Choe Ryong-hae, and Hyon Yong-chol, he received the military rank of General of the Army. He served as a commander at the April 2012 servicing ceremony, where Kim Jong Un gave his first speech.

He was appointed to the Minister of People's Security in February 2013 by Kim Jong Un and was elected as a candidate for the Central Committee full meeting on March 31, 2013. He was elected as a member of the National Defense Commission.

He was elected delegate in the election to the 13th Supreme People's Assembly. On May 17, it was reported that he had visited a site of a collapsed high-rise apartment in the Pyongyang area of Pyongyang City and apologized to the bereaved family members and residents along with senior government officials. In December of the same year, it was confirmed that Choi had been demoted to major general. In October 2015, it was confirmed that Choi was again promoted to a general rank.

In July 2016, he was placed under sanctions by the United States government.

In February 2020 he was replaced by Kim Jong-ho.

On August 20, 2020, it was reported that he is now in charge of handling military affairs for the Central Committee of the Workers' Party of Korea.

== Awards and honors ==
The official portrait of Choe shows Choe wearing all decorations awarded to him.

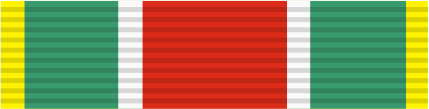

Political offices
Preceded by Ri Myong-su	Minister of People's Security; February 2013-February 2020	Succeeded by Kim Jong-ho
