= 9th Secretariat of the Workers' Party of Korea =

The 9th Secretariat of the Workers' Party of Korea, officially the Secretariat of the 9th Central Committee of the Workers' Party of Korea (Korean: 제9기 조선로동당 중앙위원회 비서국), was elected on 23 February 2026 by the 1st Plenary Session of the 9th Central Committee.

== Leadership ==
- General Secretary of the Workers' Party of Korea: Kim Jong Un

== Members ==
The following were elected as members of the 9th Secretariat. The Secretariat is composed of the General Secretary and the secretaries of the Central Committee.

The names of members are listed according to the order of their election at the 1st plenary meeting of the 9th Central Committee.

Rank	Name	Korean	8th (Note: Status in the Secretariat at the end of the 8th Central Committee's term.)
1	Kim Jong Un	김정은	Yes
2	Kim Jae-ryong (Note: Kim Jae-ryong was dismissed on 22 June 2026.)	김재룡	No
3	Ri Il-hwan	리일환	Yes
4	Jong Kyong-thaek	정경택	No
5	Kim Song-nam	김성남	No
6	Sin Yong-il	신영일	No
7	Ri Hi-yong	리히용	Yes
8	Ju Chang-il	주창일	No
9	Jo Chun-ryong	조춘룡	Yes
10	An Kum-chol	안금철	No
11	Kim Jong-gwan	김정관	No
12	Kim Sung-du	김승두	No
—	Jo Yong-won (Note: Jo Yong-won was elected on 22 June 2026.)	조용원	Yes
