= Type 70 pistol =

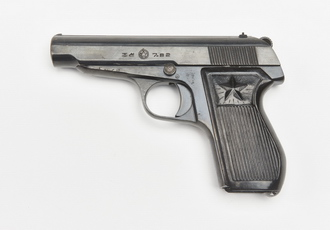
- Type: Semi-automatic pistol
- Place of origin: North Korea

Service history
- In service: 1970－

Production history
- Designed: 1970

Specifications
- Cartridge: .32 ACP
- Action: Blowback
- Feed system: 7-round detachable magazine

The Type 70 (Korean: 70식 권총) is a North Korean-designed and manufactured semi-automatic pistol chambered in .32 ACP.

== History ==
The Type 70 was first produced in 1970. It replaced the Type 64, which is a clone of the Browning M1900.

=== Operational Use ===
The Type 70 is issued to both high-ranking Korean People's Army and Ministry of Social Security officers. The Type 68 pistol continues to be used by junior and senior non-commissioned officers in the KPA.

== Design ==
The Type 70 is modeled after the FN M1910, Makarov PM, and the Walther PPK. The pistol has a blowback action and has fixed iron sights.

It is 6.3 inches long, with a barrel length of 3.74 inches. The muzzle velocity is 1,035 feet per second with an effective range of 50 meters. The pistol uses a cross bolt-type safety, located above the trigger. The magazine release is at the bottom of the grip.

To disassemble the Type 70, the safety needs to taken out first.
