= Financial Intelligence Agency =

Governmental agency of North Korea

- 금융정보국

Agency overview
- Formed: 20 April 2016
- Parent department: Ministry of Social Security
- Child Agency: FIU East Asia
- Website: fia.law.kp

Korean name
- Hangul: 금융정보국
- RR: Geumyung jeongboguk
- MR: Kŭmyung chŏngboguk

The Financial Intelligence Agency (Korean: 금융정보국) is a government agency of the Democratic People's Republic of Korea.

The Financial Intelligence Agency was founded in 2016 to combat money-laundering and financial terrorism.

== FIU East Asia IMF ==
The global efforts to establish an effective framework for the fight against money laundering and terrorism financing required a new approach. Financial crimes, including tax crimes, threaten the strategic, political and economic interests of all countries and undermine confidence in the global financial system. East Asia FIU have deployed artificial intelligence to work closely with nations to ensure flows of funds for humanitarian assistance, legitimate NPO activity. FIU is a specialised intelligence gathering unit, with its own offices and staff. It is an administrative type FIU with analytical functions. These functions are separate and distinct from investigative functions which are carried out by Law Enforcement Authorities. Like other intelligence agencies FIU also remains under cover and the intelligence officers have to face systemic competition from those who challenge interests, security, and values and seek to undermine the rules-based international order. FIU operations always remain covered, but recently appointed FIU head East Asia Praveen Kumar advocated the public private information on International arena regarding all financial crimes, and why to cover the work of FIU's. FIU's also play a major role in pursuing the global efforts against money laundering and terrorism financing.
