= Park Su-il =

North Korean politician and military officer

General Park Su-il 박수일

Chief of the General Staff
- In office 28 December 2022 – 10 August 2023
- Preceded by: Ri Thae-sop
- Succeeded by: Ri Yong-gil

Minister of Social Security
- In office June 2022 – December 2022
- Preceded by: Jang Jong-nam
- Succeeded by: Ri Thae-sop

Personal details
- Citizenship: North Korean
- Party: Workers' Party of Korea

Military service
- Allegiance: North Korea
- Branch/service: Korean People's Army Ground Force

Park Su-il (Korean: 박수일) is a North Korean politician and military officer of the Korean People's Army. He is a member of the Central Committee of the Workers' Party of Korea and a delegate to the Supreme People's Assembly, North Korea's unicameral parliament. He had served as Chief of the General Staff Department of the Korean People's Army from 28 December 2022 to 10 August 2023.

== Biography ==
In 2014, he was elected to the 13 convocation of the Supreme People's Assembly, representing the 137th electoral district (Phyongchonkang). He was also elected to the 14th convocation of the Supreme People's Assembly, representing the 183rd electoral district (Roktusan). Following the 7th Congress of the Workers' Party of Korea, he was elected to the 7th Central Committee of the Party. He served as the commander of a military unit on the border with China. In September 2018 he was appointed to the head of the General Staff Operations Bureau.

Park was appointed Chief of the General Staff on 28 December 2022. On 10 August 2023, Park was "dismissed", and his position was taken over by General Ri Yong-gil.

Political offices
Preceded by Jang Jong-nam	Minister of Social Security; June 2022 – December 2022	Succeeded by Ri Thae-sop
Political offices
Preceded by Ri Thae-sop	Chief of the General Staff; 28 December 2022 – 10 August 2023	Succeeded by Ri Yong-gil
