= Jong Sang-hak =

North Korean politician

- 정상학

Member of the WPK Politburo

Personal details
- Occupation: Politician

Jong Sang-hak (Korean: 정상학) is a North Korean politician who is serving as member of the 8th Politburo of the 8th Central Committee of the Workers' Party of Korea.

== Biography ==
From 10 January 2021 to June 2022 he served as the head of the Central Auditing Commission of the Workers' Party of Korea. Following the 1st Plenary Session of the 8th Central Committee during the 8th WPK Congress he was elected a member of the 8th Politburo. In addition to that, he was elected a director of the Central Committee department. He is considered to be part of a new elite generation, promoted to power by Kim Jong-un.
