= Ministry of Social Security (North Korea) =

North Korean law enforcement agency

- 사회안전성
- Flag used by the Ministry of Social Security

- Emblem of the Ministry of Social Security

- Patch worn by guards in Pyongyang

Agency overview
- Formed: November 19, 1945; 80 years ago
- Jurisdiction: State Affairs Commission of North Korea
- Headquarters: Pyongyang, North Korea; 39°4′49″N 125°46′3″E
- Minister responsible: Ri Thae-sop
- Child agencies: Social Security Forces; Railway Security Bureau; Financial Intelligence Agency

Korean name
- Hangul: 사회안전성
- Hanja: 社會安全省
- RR: Sahoe anjeonseong
- MR: Sahoe anjŏnsŏng

The Ministry of Social Security (previously known as the Ministry of People's Security from 2000 to 2020) is the interior ministry and principal law enforcement agency within North Korea. The ministry serves as the official public and internal security force, responsible for maintaining public order and protecting key facilities including railways and other forms of transport. It also maintains a large paramilitary internal force, known as the Social Security Forces.

Unlike most ministries in North Korea, which operate under the Cabinet, the Ministry of Social Security is directly supervised by the State Affairs Commission, though in the past it has been subordinate to other national bodies. The current minister is Ri Yong-gil. According to Fyodor Tertitskiy, columnist at NK News, prospective officers are chosen by recommendation by a local Workers' Party of Korea (WPK) Committee, although some are chosen because of their songbun status.

== History ==
The ministry was first created as the Political Security Bureau (Korean: 정치보안국) on November 19, 1945. The bureau became a subordinate to the Ministry of Internal Affairs in September 1948.

The bureau became a separate ministry known as the Ministry of Social Security (Korean: 사회안전성) in May 1951. However, the ministry was later merged back with the Ministry of Internal Affairs in October 1952.

The Ministry of Social Security was re-established in October 1962 after splitting from the Ministry of Internal Affairs. It became the Social Security Department (Korean: 사회안전부) in December 1972. The department was a subordinate to the Administration Council. In April 1982, the department was split from the Administration Council but was later returned to its control in December 1986.

The department was renamed back to the Ministry of Social Security in September 1998 and became subordinate to the Cabinet. In April 2000, the name of the ministry was changed to Ministry of People's Security (Korean: 인민보안성).

In April 2010, the ministry became the People's Security Department (Korean: 인민보안부) and was transferred to the control of the National Defence Commission.

In 2016, the department was renamed back to the Ministry of People's Security and became subordinate to the State Affairs Commission.

In May 2020, it was changed back to the Ministry of Social Security.

== Duties ==
The main duties of the Ministry of Social Security include policing, protecting key government installations and transport, as well as monitoring the public distribution system and providing bodyguards to important persons. It consists of five child agencies - the Railway Security Bureau, which guards important routes of travel and transport within the DPRK, the Financial Intelligence Agency, which combats money-laundering, extortion and other financial crimes, the Protection Bureau, which is responsible for fire protection, traffic control, public health, and customs, the Corrections Bureau, which operates the brutal prison system in North Korea, and the Social Security Forces, which effectively serve as a Gendarmerie and riot police force.

Aside from general policing, the Ministry of Social Security through the Registration Bureau is also responsible for issuing North Korean identity documents to North Korean citizens investigates serious crimes such as theft, extortion and blackmail. The Ministry of Social Security gathers information from local informers in social units about irregular acts. If a case is believed to be of a political nature, it is instead handed over to the Ministry of State Security (North Korea's Thought Police) for investigation of their actions and anti-socialist thoughts. The Ministry of Social Security primarily operates via a large network of offices and departments throughout the DPRK, ensuring a significant law enforcement presence in large cities, especially the capital, Pyongyang.

== Structure ==
=== Korean People's Social Security Forces ===
The Korean People's Social Security Forces (Korean: 조선인민내무군) formerly known as People's Guards Forces (Korean: 조선인민경비대) is subordinated to the ministry and is essentially the North Korean counterpart to the Internal Troops of Soviet and post-Soviet states. It is in charge of security for major national facilities such as military demarcation lines, borders, and coastal security, as well as government buildings, Yongbyon nuclear facilities, power plants, and broadcasting facilities. It is the country's internal troops and civil defense organization organized in military lines.

In the 1980s, the work of the People's Guards was transferred to the National Security Agency, and the border guard was believed to have passed to the People's Armed Forces Ministry in October 1996. In 2010 the then People's Security Forces became the People's Internal Security Forces, and in 2020 was renamed as the People's Social Security Forces.

== Equipment ==
Within the DPRK's internal security apparatus, assault rifles and other heavy weapons are mainly carried by specialized paramilitary units such as the Social Security Forces.

Name	Country of origin	Type	Users	Notes
Type 68	North Korea	Semi-automatic pistol	Standard issue	North Korean TT-33 copy
Type 70	North Korea	Semi-automatic pistol	K-9 officers, patrolman, patrolwomen	Indigenous design
Baek-Du San pistol	North Korea	Semi-automatic pistol	In service	North Korean CZ-75 copy
Type 58	North Korea	Assault rifle	Corrections Bureau guards, Social Security Forces	North Korean AK copy
Type 68	North Korea	Assault rifle	Corrections Bureau guards, Social Security Forces	North Korean AK copy
Type 88	North Korea	Assault rifle	Corrections Bureau guards, Social Security Forces	North Korean AK copy
Type 73 light machine gun	North Korea	Light machine gun	Corrections Bureau guards, Social Security Forces	North Korean PK machine gun and ZB vz.26 copy
RPG-7	Soviet Union	Grenade launcher	Corrections Bureau guards, Social Security Forces	Used in small numbers

== Ministers ==
=== Ministers of Interior ===
- Pak Il-u (박일우) (2 September 1948)
- Pang Hak Se (방학세) (1952–1960)
- Pak Mun-gyu (박문규) (23 October 1960 – 22 October 1962 and 23 October 1962)
- Pak Song-chol (박성철) (1 December 1967)

=== Ministers of Social Security ===
- Paek Hak-rim (1998-2003)
- Choe Ryong-su (2003-2004)
- Ju Sang-song (2004-2010)
- Ri Myong-su (2010-2013)
- Choe Pu-il (2013–2020)
- Kim Jong-ho (2020 – January 2021)
- Ri Yong-gil: January 2021 – July 2021
- Kim Jong-ho: July 2021 – September 2021
- Jang Jong-nam: September 2021 – December 2021
- Ri Thae-sop: December 2021 – June 2022
- Park Su-il: June 2022 – December 2022
- Ri Thae-sop: 28 December 2022 – present

== Ranks ==
Rank	Insignia
General	
Colonel General	
Lieutenant General	
Major General	
Senior Colonel	
Colonel	
Lieutenant Colonel	
Major	
Captain	
Senior Lieutenant	
Lieutenant	
Junior Lieutenant	
First Sergeant	
Senior Sergeant	
Sergeant	
Junior Sergeant	
Corporal	
Lance Corporal	
Senior Private	
Private	

== See also ==
- Amrokkang Sports Club
- Rimyongsu Sports Club
