= Korea Mining and Development Trading Corporation =

North Korean arm dealer

- Trade name: KOMID; Korea Kumryong Trading Corporation; Kapmun Tosong Trade; Korean Mining and Development Corp.; Korea Mining Development Trading Corp.; CSC; Changgwang Shinyong Corporation
- Native name: 조선광업개발무역회사
- Industry: Arms manufacturing
- Headquarters: Central District, Pyongyang, North Korea
- Key people: Yo'n Cho'ng Nam (chief representative)
- Subsidiaries: Korea Taesong Trading Company; Korea Heungjin Trading Company; Hong Kong Electronics; Hesong Trading Corporation; Tosong Technology Trading Corporation

Korea Mining Development Trading Corporation (also known as Changgwang Shinyong Corporation, Kapmun Tosong, KOMID; Korean: 조선광업개발무역회사) is North Korea’s primary arms dealer, and main exporter of goods and equipment related to ballistic missiles and conventional weapons.

== History ==
Korea Mining Development Trading Corporation (KOMID), a North Korean state-owned entity, was previously listed in the annex to E.O. 13382 on July 1, 2005 for its role in North Korea's proliferation of weapons of mass destruction. It was also sanctioned by the United Nations in April 2009 and 29 October 2014. KOMID has offices in multiple countries around the world and facilitates weapons sales for the North Korean government.

=== Employees ===
- Yo’n Cho’ng Nam (chief representative);
- Ko Ch’o’l-Chae (deputy chief representative);
- Kim Kyu (external affairs officer);
- Kil Jong Hun;
- Kim Kwang Yon;
- Jang Song Chol;
- Kim Yong Chol;
- Jang Yong Son;
- Ryu Jin;
- Kang Ryong.
