= General Staff Department of the Korean People's Army =

North Korean military body

Chief of the General Staff of the Korean People's Army
- 조선인민군 총참모장

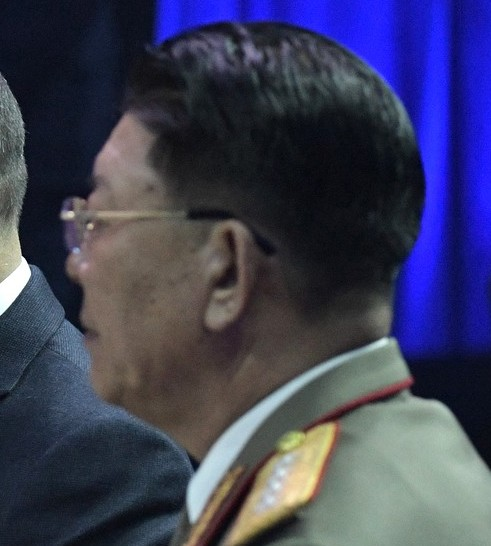
- Incumbent; Ri Yong-gil since 28 December 2022
- Korean People's Army
- Reports to: Minister of Defence
- Appointer: Commander-in-Chief
- Formation: February 1948
- First holder: Colonel General Kang Kon
- Deputy: Deputy Chief of the Korean People's Army

- Chief of the General Staff of the Korean People's Army
- Chosŏn'gŭl: 조선인민군 총참모장
- Revised Romanization: Joseoninmingun Chongchammojang
- McCune–Reischauer: Chosŏninmin'gun Ch'ongch'ammojang

The General Staff Department (GSD) of the Korean People's Army (KPA) is the senior military leadership of the armed forces of North Korea responsible for its administrative, operational and logistical needs. The current Chief of the General Staff is Vice Marshal Ri Yong-gil.

== Duties ==
The GSD is the principal administrative body of the KPA besides the Ministry of Defense, which gives it the authority to do the following:

- Plan the national defense policy for the KPA
- Assess threats to the sovereignty and security of the state
- Regulate the training, education, and organization of the KPA

== Chiefs of the General Staff of the Korean People's Army ==
No.	Portrait	Chief of the General Staff	Took office	Left office	Time in office	Defence branch
1	Kang Kon강건	Colonel General; Kang Kon 강건 (1918–1950)	February 1948	September 1950	2 years, 7 months	Korean People's Army Ground Force
2	Nam Il남일	General; Nam Il 남일 (1915–1976)	September 1950	August 1953	2 years, 11 months	Korean People's Army Ground Force
3	Kim Kwang-hyop김광협	General; Kim Kwang-hyop 김광협 (1915–1970)	August 1953	September 1957	4 years, 1 month	Korean People's Army Ground Force
4	Lee Kwon-mu리권무	Colonel General; Lee Kwon-mu 리권무 (1914–1986?)	September 1957	July 1959	1 year, 10 months	Korean People's Army Ground Force
5	Kim Chang-bong김창봉	Colonel General; Kim Chang-bong 김창봉 (born 1919)	July 1959	October 1962	3 years, 3 months	Korean People's Army Ground Force
6	Choe Kwang최광	General; Choe Kwang 최광 (1918–1997)	October 1962	December 1968	6 years, 2 months	Korean People's Army Ground Force
7	O Jin-u오진우	General; O Jin-u 오진우 (1917–1995)	December 1968	September 1979	10 years, 9 months	Korean People's Army Ground Force
8	O Kuk-ryol오극렬	General; O Kuk-ryol 오극렬 (1930–2023)	September 1979	February 1988	8 years, 5 months	Korean People's Army Ground Force
(6)	Choe Kwang최광	Marshal; Choe Kwang 최광 (1918–1997)	February 1988	October 1995	7 years, 8 months	Korean People's Army Ground Force
9	Kim Yong-chun김영춘	Vice Marshal; Kim Yong-chun 김영춘 (1936–2018)	October 1995	April 2007	11 years, 6 months	Korean People's Army Ground Force
10	Kim Kyok-sik김격식	General; Kim Kyok-sik 김격식 (1938–2015)	April 2007	February 2009	1 year, 10 months	Korean People's Army Ground Force
11	Ri Yong-ho리영호	Vice Marshal; Ri Yong-ho 리영호 (1942–2012)	February 2009	July 2012	3 years, 5 months	Korean People's Army Ground Force
12	Hyon Yong-chol현영철	Vice Marshal; Hyon Yong-chol 현영철 (1949–2015)	July 2012	May 2013	10 months	Korean People's Army Ground Force
(10)	Kim Kyok-sik김격식	General; Kim Kyok-sik 김격식 (1938–2015)	May 2013	August 2013	3 months	Korean People's Army Ground Force
13	Ri Yong-gil리영길	General; Ri Yong-gil 리영길 (born 1952)	August 2013	January 2016	2 years, 6 months	Korean People's Army Ground Force
14	Ri Myong-su리명수	Vice Marshal; Ri Myong-su 리명수 (born 1934)	February 2016	June 2018	2 years, 4 months	Korean People's Army Ground Force
(13)	Ri Yong-gil리영길	General; Ri Yong-gil 리영길 (born 1952)	4 June 2018	6 September 2019	1 year, 3 months	Korean People's Army Ground Force
15	Pak Jong-chon박정천	Marshal; Pak Jong-chon 박정천	6 September 2019	7 September 2021	2 years	Korean People's Army Ground Force
16	Rim Kwang-il림광일	General; Rim Kwang-il 림광일 (born 1965)	7 September 2021	8 June 2022	9 months	Korean People's Army Ground Force
17	Ri Thae-sop리태섭	General; Ri Thae-sop 리태섭	8 June 2022	28 December 2022	6 months	Korean People's Army Ground Force
18	Park Su-il박수일	General; Park Su-il 박수일	28 December 2022	10 August 2023	7 months	Korean People's Army Ground Force
(13)	Ri Yong-gil리영길	Vice Marshal; Ri Yong-gil 리영길 (born 1952)	10 August 2023	Incumbent	3 years	Korean People's Army Ground Force

== See also ==
- Ministry of National Defence (North Korea)
