= Kim Jong-ho (politician) =

North Korean politician

- 김정호
- Supreme Leader: Kim Il Sung

Personal details
- Citizenship: North Korean
- Party: Workers' Party of Korea

Military service
- Allegiance: North Korea
- Branch/service: Korean People's Army
- Rank: Colonel general

Kim Jong-ho (Korean: 김정호) is a North Korean politician and military officer. He has served as a member of the Central Committee of the Workers' Party of Korea, Minister of Social Security, member of the State Affairs Commission, and chairman of the Legislative Committee of the Supreme People's Assembly. He holds military rank of General.

== Biography ==
His birthplace and date of birth unknown. In 2001, it was reported that a person with the same name was the Deputy Minister of the Ministry of People's Security. He was elected as a delegate to the 14th convocation of the Supreme People's Assembly on March 10, 2019, and the 5th plenary session of the 7th Central Committee of the Workers' Party of Korea held from December 28 of the same year he was elected as a member of the Party Central Committee. In February 2020, he was appointed Minister of People's Security.

At the 3rd session of the 14th convocation of the Supreme People's Assembly held on April 12, 2020, he was elected as a member of the State Affairs Commission of North Korea and chairman of the Legislative Committee of the Supreme People's Assembly.

At the 8th Congress of the Workers' Party of Korea, which was held from January 5, 2021, he dropped out of the party's Central Committee and was dismissed from the post of Minister of Social Security but returned in July of the same year. On September 7, 2021, he was dismissed as Minister of Social Security by the politburo, on the second day of the 5th session of the 14th Supreme People's Assembly held on September 30, 2021. At the meeting, he was summoned by a member of the State Affairs Commission and chairman of the Legislative Committee of the Supreme People's Assembly.
