= Kang Sun-nam =

North Korean politician

General Kang Sun-nam
- 강순남
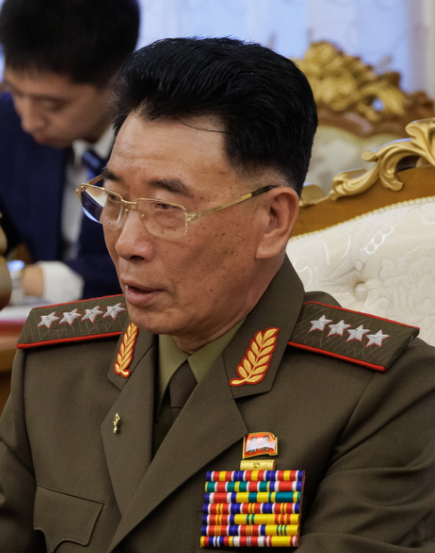
- Kang in 2023

Minister of Defence
- In office 31 December 2022 – 8 October 2024
- Predecessor: Ri Yong-gil
- Succeeded by: No Kwang-chol

Personal details
- Born: North Korea
- Party: Workers' Party of Korea

Military service
- Allegiance: North Korea
- Rank: General

Korean name
- Hangul: 강순남
- Hanja: 姜順南/强純男
- RR: Gang Sunnam
- MR: Kang Sunnam

Kang Sun-nam (Korean: 강순남) is a North Korean politician and general who was the minister of Defence from 2022 to 2024. He is also a member of the Central Military Commission of the Workers' Party of Korea (WPK) and a member of the 8th Central Committee of the Workers' Party of Korea

He was previously the director of the Civil Defense Department of the Workers' Party of Korea which oversees the Worker-Peasant Red Guards. He has held positions such as Deputy Minister of the People's Armed Forces and Commander of the 671st Grand Combined Unit.

== Biography ==
His birthplace and date of birth are unknown. He was first elected as a member of the funeral committee for Marshal Ri Ul Sol, who died on November 7, 2015. On December 24 of the same year, he participated in the joint operation training of the Grand Combined Forces as the commander of the 671st Combined Force. At the 7th Congress of the WPK held on May 9, 2016, he was elected as a member of the Central Committee of the Workers' Party of Korea, and although the timing of his appointment is unknown, he became Vice Minister of People's Armed Forces. On July 25, 2017, he attended the 90th anniversary of the founding of the People's Liberation Army of China at the Chinese Embassy in North Korea and met with Chinese Ambassador Li Jinjun.

He was elected as a delegate in the election of delegates to the 14th Supreme People's Assembly held on March 10, 2019. He was elected as a member of the 8th Central Committee at the 8th Congress of the Workers' Party of Korea held from January 5, 2021, and at the 1st Plenary meeting of the 8th Central Committee of the Party held on January 10, the Workers' Party of Korea He was elected as a member of the 8th Central Military Commission and the Director of the Munition Industry Department of the Central Committee.

On September 9, 2021, at the military parade celebrating the 73rd anniversary of the founding of the country, it was confirmed that he was appointed director of the Civil Defense department of the WPK.

On April 14, 2022, he was promoted to general by order of the Central Military Commission. In August that year he made a report to the 6th meeting of the Workers' Peasants Red Guard.

On 31 December 2022, during a plenary session of the WPK, Kang was appointed the minister of Defence.

In July 2023, Russian Defense Sergei Shoigu arrived in North Korea for the 70th anniversary of the end of the Korean War. He met with Kang Sun-nam and North Korean leader Kim Jong Un. During the meeting, Shoigu praised the North Korean army as the "most powerful" in the world.

On 8 October 2024, during 11th Session of the 14th Supreme People's Assembly, Kang was replaced by No Kwang-chol as the minister of Defence.

== Awards and honors ==
During the February 8, 2023 parade, Kang could be seen wearing all decorations awarded to him.
