= Pak Jong-chon =

North Korean military officer

Marshal Pak Jong-chon

Vice Chairman of the Central Military Commission
- Incumbent
- Assumed office 31 December 2023
- Chairman: Kim Jong Un
- In office 25 April 2022 – 1 January 2023
- Chairman: Kim Jong Un
- Preceded by: Ri Pyong-chol
- Succeeded by: Ri Yong-gil

Chief of the General Staff
- In office 6 September 2019 – 7 September 2021
- Supreme Commander: Kim Jong Un
- First Deputy Chief: Kim Myong-sik
- Preceded by: Ri Yong-gil
- Succeeded by: Rim Kwang-il

Director of the Military Leadership Department
- Incumbent
- Assumed office Unknown
- Chairman: Kim Jong Un
- Preceded by: O Il-jong

Personal details
- Born: Pyongyang, North Korea
- Party: Workers' Party of Korea
- Education: Kim Il Sung Military University

Military service
- Allegiance: North Korea
- Branch/service: Korean People's Army
- Rank: Marshal of the Korean People's Army

Korean name
- Hangul: 박정천
- Hanja: 朴正天
- RR: Bak Jeongcheon
- MR: Pak Chŏngch'ŏn

Pak Jong-chon (Korean: 박정천) is a North Korean Marshal who is a vice chairman of the Central Military Commission of the Workers' Party of Korea (WPK).

== Biography ==
In 2014, he was appointed Deputy Chief of the General Staff and Chief of Fire Command at the General Staff. However, he was demoted to Major General in 2015 and the Deputy Chief of Staff was fired. In 2016 he was promoted to Lieutenant General and was elected a member of the Central Committee of the Workers' Party of Korea and Director General of the General Staff Department. He was promoted to Colonel General in 2017. He was promoted to General of the Army on April 14, 2019, and was appointed Chief of Staff of the General Staff of the Korean People's Army, having replaced Ri Yong-gil. The appointment is attributed to the successful launch of the new short-range ballistic missile as Artillery Director.

Pak also accompanied Kim Jong Un to the ceremony to the upgrading of the status of Samjiyon from a county (kun) status to a city which was described by the news as a socialist "paradise". He also has accompanied Kim Jong Un to Mt. Paektu and was seen riding near him on a horse.

On May 23, 2020, Pak was promoted to vice marshal. He is often considered a "rising star" in the North Korean power hierarchy.

On 5 October 2020, Pak was promoted to Marshal of the Korean People's Army.

He was reportedly stripped of his Marshal title and demoted to alternate Politburo member in June 2021, following an unspecified "grave incident". In September, however, he was promoted to member of the Politburo Presidium and transferred from his military role to a position as secretary of the Central Committee. On 25 April 2022 he was disclosed as a vice chairman of the Central Military Commission of the Workers' Party of Korea.

On 1 January 2023, he was removed as the vice chairman of the CMC. He was also dismissed as secretary of the Central Committee.

On 31 August 2023 Kim Jong-Un visited the Training Command Post of the KPA General Staff Department where he was accompanied by Defense Minister Kang Sun-Nam and Marshal Pak Jong-chon reappearing in military duties, some sources speculated that Pak was given the title Director of the Political Leadership over Military Affairs of the Central Committee of the WPK.

On 9 September 2023, he was seen wearing a Marshal of the KPA Uniform and insignia similar to Ri Pyong-chol's uniform.

On 10 September 2023, he left with Kim Jong-un and several officials from the Workers Party, and Armed Forces Organ. On 12 September 2023 Pak and several officials including Defense Minister Kang Sun-Nam and Ri Pyong-chol arrived at Russia for a summit with Vladimir Putin which may discuss arms deal that are not supported by the UN Security Council. Pak was seen wearing a tag with his name Pak Jong Chon and a long title on the upper text of his tag which translates to "Director of the Political Leadership over Military Affairs of the Central Committee of the Workers' Party of Korea Pak Jong Chon".

On 31 December 2023, during a plenary meeting of the WPK Central Committee, Pak was reinstated as a vice chairman of the CMC. He was also elected as a member of the 8th Politburo and a secretary of the Central Committee. He was also elected as a member of the 9th Politburo.

Party political offices
Preceded by Ri Pyong-chol	Vice Chairman of the WPK Central Military Commission; 2022–2023	Succeeded by Ri Yong-gil
Military offices
Preceded by Ri Yong-gil	Chief of the General Staff of the Korean People's Army; 2019–2021	Succeeded by Rim Kwang-il
