= Ri Myong-su =

North Korean politician (born 1934)

Vice Marshal Ri Myong-su
- 리명수

Chief of the General Staff
- In office February 2016 – June 2018
- Supreme Leader: Kim Jong Un
- Preceded by: Ri Yong-gil
- Succeeded by: Ri Yong-gil

Minister of People's Security
- In office 2011–2013
- Preceded by: Chu Sang-song
- Succeeded by: Choe Pu-il

Personal details
- Born: February 20, 1934 (age 92) Myongchon, North Hamgyong, North Korea
- Citizenship: North Korean
- Party: Workers' Party of Korea

Military service
- Allegiance: North Korea
- Branch/service: Korean People's Army
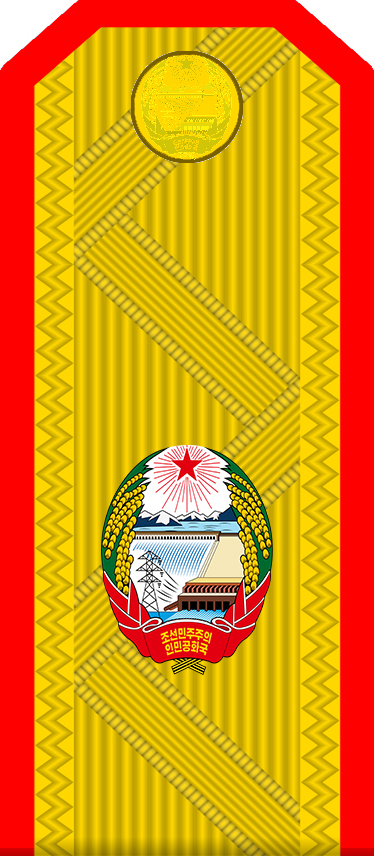
- Rank: Ch'asu (Vice Marshal)

Korean name
- Hangul: 리명수
- Hanja: 李明洙
- RR: Ri Myeongsu
- MR: Ri Myŏngsu

Ri Myong-su (Korean: 리명수; born 20 February 1934 in Myongchon, North Hamgyong) is the former chief of General Staff of the Korean People's Army from 2016 to 2018.

Ri was a confidant and military aide of the former North Korean leader Kim Jong Il. He was appointed the head of the Ministry of People's Security by Kim Jong Il in April 2011 and served in that role until removed from power by Kim Jong Un in February 2013. He was replaced by Choe Pu-il.

He was made chief of General Staff of the Korean People's Army in February 2016 and promoted to vice marshal rank in April that year.

In June 2018, it was announced that he had been sacked about a week before the summit between North Korea and the United States, and was replaced in the position by his deputy Ri Yong-gil.

== See also ==
- Rimyongsu Sports Club

Military offices
Preceded by Chu Sang-song	Minister of People's Security; 2011–2013	Succeeded by Choe Pu-il
Preceded by Ri Yong-gil	Chief of the General Staff of the Korean People's Army; 2016–2018	Succeeded by Ri Yong-gil
