= Ri Thae-sop =

North Korean politician and general

- 리태섭

Minister of Social Security
- Incumbent
- Assumed office 28 December 2022
- Supreme Leader: Kim Jong Un
- Preceded by: Park Su-il
- In office December 2021 – June 2022
- Preceded by: Jang Jong-nam
- Succeeded by: Park Su-il

Chief of the KPA General Staff
- In office June 2022 – 28 December 2022
- Supreme Leader: Kim Jong Un
- Preceded by: Rim Kwang-il
- Succeeded by: Park Su-il

Personal details
- Citizenship: North Korean
- Party: Workers' Party of Korea

Military service
- Allegiance: North Korea
- Branch/service: Korean People's Army
- Rank: General

- Ri Thae-sop
- Hangul: 리태섭
- Hanja: 李太夑
- RR: Ri Taeseop
- MR: Ri T'aesŏp

Ri Thae-sop (Korean: 리태섭) is a North Korean politician and general. He served as Minister of Social Security and from June 2022 to December as Chief of the General Staff. He is also a member of the Politburo of the Central Committee of the Workers’ Party of Korea. He served as Commander of the 5th Corps and Commander of the 7th Corps.

== Biography ==
Ri's birthplace and date of birth are unknown. In April 2004, he was promoted to Major General of the Korean People's Army, and in September 2010, he was elected as a candidate member of the Central Committee of the Workers' Party of Korea at the 3rd party conference. Following the death of Kim Jong Il on December 17, 2011, was included as a member of the funeral commission. He was re-elected as a representative to the 13th convocation of the Supreme People's Assembly held on March 9, 2014, and was appointed as the commander of the 7th Corps as a Lieutenant General of the Korean People's Army, although the date of his appointment is unknown. He was re-elected as a member of the Central Committee 7th Congress of the Workers' Party of Korea in May 2016.

He was re-elected as a deputy in the 14th election of the Supreme People's Assembly held in March 2019 and was present at the military parade commemorating the 75th anniversary of the founding of the Workers' Party of Korea held on October 10, 2020, marching with the 5th Corps column as a general. He was re-elected as a member of the Central Committee at the 8th Congress of the Workers' Party of Korea held from January 5, 2021, and at the 4th plenary meeting of the 8th Party Central Committee held from December 27 of the same year, he was appointed Minister of Social Security and was elected as a member of the Politburo of the Central Committee. On June 11, 2022, at the 5th Plenary Meeting of the 8th Central Committee of the Workers' Party of Korea he was promoted to Chief of the General Staff of the People's Army, replacing Rim Kwang-il. He was replaced in that position on December 28, 2022, by Park Su-il.

Political offices
Preceded by Park Su-il	Minister of Social Security; 28 December 2022 - Incumbent	Incumbent
Preceded by Jang Jong-nam	Minister of Social Security; December 2021–June 2022	Succeeded by Park Su-il
Military offices
Preceded by Rim Kwang-il	Chief of the General Staff; June 2022–28 December 2022	Succeeded by Park Su-il
