= Jang Jong-nam =

North Korean general (born c. 1960)

- Occupation: Minister of People's Armed Forces

Korean name
- Hangul: 장정남
- RR: Jang Jeongnam
- MR: Chang Chŏngnam

General Jang Jong-nam (Korean: 장정남; born c. 1960) is the current Minister of Social Security and former defence minister of North Korea. He is believed to be in his 50s.

== Career ==
Jang is believed to have played a role in the 2010 bombardment of Yeonpyeong, which killed four people.

Jang was made colonel general on the occasion of Kim Il Sung's 99th birthday in April 2011. He delivered a speech on the first anniversary of Kim Jong Il's death in December 2012 pledging loyalty to Kim Jong Un and threatening to "ravine [the enemies] into their death pitfall when the hour of decisive battle comes". He was identified as general and commander of the forward-deployed 1st Army Corps of the Korean People's Army on that occasion.

Jang was unexpectedly appointed minister of the People's Armed Forces in early May 2013. He is the third defence minister appointed by Kim Jong Un since taking control of North Korea in December 2011 (Kim Jong Il only replaced two defence ministers in his 17-year leadership). He was replaced in June 2014.

In September 2021 he was appointed minister of Social Security and promoted to alternate member of the Politburo of the Workers' Party of Korea. He was demoted in December, after merely three months. Since 2016 he has served as a member of the 7th and 8th Central Committee of the Workers' Party of Korea.

Political offices
Preceded by Kim Kyok-sik	Minister of the People's Armed Forces; 2013–2014	Succeeded by Hyon Yong-chol
Preceded by Ri Yong-gil	Minister of Social Security; 2021	Succeeded by Ri Thae-sop
