= Kim Jo-guk =

North Korean politician

- 김조국

Member of the WPK Central Military Commission
- Supreme Leader: Kim Jong Un

Personal details
- Born: North Korea
- Citizenship: North Korean
- Party: Workers' Party of Korea

Military service
- Allegiance: North Korea

Kim Jo-guk (Korean: 김조국) is a North Korean politician.

He is a member of the Central Committee of the Workers' Party of Korea and a member of the Central Military Commission of the Workers' Party of Korea. Since 2019 he is serving as first deputy head of the Organization and Guidance Department. At the time of Hwang Sun-hui's death in January 2020, he served as a member of the funeral committee. In May 2020, he attended the 4th Enlarged meeting of the 7th plenary session of the Central Military Commission and the 20th Politburo meeting of the 7th Central Committee in November 2020. During the 8th Congress of the WPK he was elected full member of the 8th Central Committee.
