= Kim Jong-gwan =

North Korean politician and military officer

General Kim Jong-gwan

Vice Premier of North Korea
- Incumbent
- Assumed office 29 December 2024
- Premier: Pak Thae-song

Minister of Defence
- In office December 2019 – 29 September 2021
- Preceded by: No Kwang-chol
- Succeeded by: Ri Yong-gil

Personal details
- Born: North Korea
- Citizenship: North Korean
- Party: Workers' Party of Korea

Military service
- Allegiance: North Korea
- Branch/service: Korean People's Army
- Rank: General

Kim Jong-gwan (Korean: 김정관; Hanja: 金正官) is a North Korean politician and military officer who is currently a vice premier of North Korea. He previously served as Minister of People's Armed Forces from December 2019 to September 2021. He currently holds the rank of general after being demoted from Vice-Marshal rank.

== Biography ==
Kim is a General of the Korean People's Army and previously commanded the General Construction Bureau. In May 2016, he was appointed a member of the 7th Central Committee of the Workers' Party of Korea at the 7th Congress of the Workers' Party of Korea. In March 2009, he was elected the 12th convocation for the 334th district of the Supreme People's Assembly. He was a member of the Funeral committee of Ri Ul-sol who died in August 2015 and Kim Yong-chun who died in August 2018. In December 2019 he was appointed to the Minister of People's Armed Forces and promoted to General and became also an alternate member of the Politburo of the Central Committee of the Workers' Party of Korea.

On December 29, 2024, Kim was appointed as Vice Premier at the conclusion of the annual year-end general meeting of the Central Committee of the Workers' Party of Korea.

In the 9th Party Congress he was appointed a member of the 9th Central Committee and 9th Secretariat.

Political offices
Preceded by Pak Yong-sik	Minister of People's Armed Forces; December 2019–2021	Succeeded by Ri Yong-gil
