= Rim Kwang-il =

North Korean general and politician (born 1965)

- 림광일

Chief of the KPA General Staff
- In office 7 September 2021 – 8 June 2022
- Supreme Leader: Kim Jong Un
- Preceded by: Pak Jong-chon
- Succeeded by: Ri Thae-sop

Personal details
- Born: 1965 (age 60–61)
- Citizenship: North Korean
- Party: Workers' Party of Korea

Military service
- Allegiance: North Korea
- Branch/service: Korean People's Army
- Rank: General

Rim Kwang-il (Korean: 림광일; born 1965) is a North Korean general and politician who served as Chief of the General Staff Department of the Korean People's Army.

== Biography ==
In January 2016, he was appointed the 1st Deputy Chief of the General Staff of the Korean People's Army and the Director-General of Operations Department, succeeding Kim Chun-sam. He was promoted to First Deputy Director-General of the General Staff Reconnaissance General Bureau in 2017 and was promoted to Colonel general in April of the same year. At the 5th Plenary Session of the 7th Central Committee of the Workers' Party of Korea held in December 2019, he was elected as a member of the Central Committee of the Workers' Party of Korea and appointed Director General of the Reconnaissance General Bureau to succeed Jang Gil-sung. Afterwards, he was promoted to a rank in the Korean People's Army and was elected a member of the Party Central Military Commission. In 2020, he was promoted to general of the Korean People's Army, and in 2021 he was appointed a candidate member of the Politburo of the Party Central Committee, and in September he was appointed Chief of the General Staff of the Korean People's Army. In 2015, he served as a member of the funeral committee at the time of the death of Ri Eul-Seol and Kim Yang-Gun.

Military offices
Preceded by Pak Jong-chon	Chief of the General Staff; 7 September 2021 – 8 June 2022	Succeeded by Ri Thae-sop
