= O Il-jong =

North Korean politician

General O Il-jong

Director of the CC Military Department
- Leader: Kim Jong Un
- Supreme Leader: Kim Jong Il

Personal details
- Born: 1954 (age 71–72) Pyongyang, North Korea
- Citizenship: North Korean
- Party: Workers' Party of Korea
- Parent: O Jin-u (father)
- Education: Kim Il Sung University; Kim Il Sung Military University

Military service
- Allegiance: North Korea
- Branch/service: Korean People's Army
- Rank: General

Korean name
- Hangul: 오일정
- Hanja: 吳日晶
- RR: O Iljeong
- MR: O Ilchŏng

O Il-jong (Korean: 오일정, born 1954) is a North Korean politician and four-star general (대장) of the Korean People's Army.

== Biography ==
O Il-jong was born in 1954 in Pyongyang. A graduate of economics at the Kim Il Sung University and Kim Il Sung Military University (he graduated from the academy only in the 90s). He is the third son of O Jin-u, the Minister of the Defense of the North Korea who died in 1995, who for years was one of Kim Il Sung's closest associates and one of the most important figures in the North Korean political system.

In the 1980s, O Il-jong worked in diplomacy, he was the military attaché of the DPRK embassy in Egypt. Then, from 1985, he worked at a state-owned foreign trade company. In 1989 he became the commander of the regiment and then a brigade. He received the general nomination for the rank of major-general (소장) in April 1992. From November 1994 he was the commander of the 26th Division in the 4th Corps of the Korean People's Army.

During the 3rd Conference of the Workers' Party of Korea on September 28, 2010, he was appointed director of the Military Department of the WPK Central Committee, (replacing Kim Song-gyu), was promoted to a two-star Major-General, and was also a member of the Central Committee for the first time. In April 2011 he was promoted to the rank of colonel general.

After the death of Kim Jong Il in December 2011, O Il-jong found himself on the high, 40th place in the 232-person Funeral Committee.

Around the end of 2019 at the 5th plenary of the 7th Central Committee of the Workers' Party of Korea, he was believed to have replaced Choe Pu-il as the director of the Military Department. On 10 January 2021, O Il-jong was elected as a member of the Politburo of the Workers' Party of Korea.

He was promoted to a four star general on 14 April 2022, by order of Kim Jong Un.

He was excluded from the 9th Central Committee of the Workers' Party of Korea.
