= Kim Tu-il =

North Korean politician

- 김두일

WPK Provincial Party Committee Secretary of South Pyongan Province
- Incumbent
- Assumed office October 2017
- Supreme Leader: Kim Jong Un
- Preceded by: Pak Thae-song

Personal details
- Citizenship: North Korean
- Party: Workers' Party of Korea
- Occupation: Politician

Kim Tu-il (Korean: 김두일) is a North Korean politician. He is a member of the Central Committee of the Workers' Party of Korea and Chairman of the Provincial Party Committee of South Pyongan Province.

== Biography ==
After serving as Vice-Chairman of the South Pyongan Province Party Committee, on October 7, 2017, at the second Plenum of the 7th Central Committee of the Workers' Party of Korea he was elected a member of the Central Committee and Chairman of the South Pyongan Province Party Committee. He was elected to the 14th convocation of the Supreme People's Assembly representing Saedok electoral district. He was member of the funeral committee of Kim Yong-chun.
