= Ri Pyong-chol =

North Korean politician

Marshal Ri Pyong-chol

Commander of the Korean People's Army Air and Anti-Air Force
- In office unknown–2014
- Supreme Commander: Kim Jong Un
- Chairman: Kim Jong Un
- Succeeded by: Kim Kwang-hyok

First Deputy Director of the Organization and Guidance Department
- Incumbent
- Assumed office unknown
- Leader: Kim Jong Un

Vice Chairman of the Central Military Commission of the Workers' Party of Korea
- Incumbent
- Assumed office 21 June 2022
- Chairman: Kim Jong Un
- Preceded by: Seat created
- In office 23 May 2020 – 30 June 2021
- Preceded by: Choe Ryong-hae

Personal details
- Born: 1948 (age 77–78) North Korea
- Citizenship: North Korean
- Party: Workers' Party of Korea
- Education: Red Flag Mangyongdae Revolutionary School

Military service
- Allegiance: North Korea
- Branch: Korean People's Army
- Service years: 1965–present
- Rank: Marshal

Korean name
- Hangul: 리병철
- Hanja: 李炳鐵; 李炳哲
- RR: Ri Byeongcheol
- MR: Ri Pyŏngch'ŏl

Ri Pyong-chol (Korean: 리병철, born 1948) is a North Korean military official and formerly a top advisor of supreme leader Kim Jong Un, who serves as Vice Chairman of the Central Military Commission and a member of the Presidium of the Politburo of the Workers' Party of Korea. He is a relative of Kim's wife, Ri Sol-ju. He currently also serves as a director of a department of the Central Committee of the Workers' Party of Korea (WPK) and First Deputy Director of the WPK Organization and Guidance Department (OGD). General Ri's military and senior Party experience make him an important advisor to Kim Jong Un, especially during crisis. He is an alternate member of the WPK Political Bureau, and a deputy to the Supreme People's Assembly. Ri served in the Korean People's Army Air Force until 2014 at which time he became a senior party official.

In December 2017, the U.S. Treasury department issued sanctions against him, blocking him from "any property or interests in property within U.S. jurisdiction, and prohibits [him] from transactions with American citizens".

In late 2019, Ri became a director of a department of the Central Committee of the party, possibly of the Munitions Industry Department, where he was previously the senior deputy director.

On 23 May 2020, Ri became a vice chairman of the Central Military Commission of the Workers' Party of Korea. On 13 August he also became a member of the Presidium of the Politburo of the Workers' Party of Korea. On 5 October, he was promoted to Marshal of the Korean People's Army.

Following an unspecified "serious incident" in June 2021, Ri was stripped of his military title and demoted to a junior position in the party. He was again identified as a Politburo Presidium member and secretary of the Central Committee at the celebrations for the 90th anniversary of the Korean People's Army on 25 April 2022.

== Awards and honors ==
During the 8 February 2023 parade, Ri was seen wearing all decorations awarded to him.

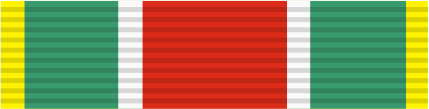

Party political offices
New seat	Vice Chairman of the WPK Central Military Commission; 2022–present	Incumbent
Vacant Title last held by Choe Ryong-hae	Vice Chairman of the WPK Central Military Commission; 2020–2021	Succeeded by Pak Jong-chon
Military offices
Preceded by	Commander of the Korean People's Army Air and Anti-Air Force; 2008–2014	Succeeded by
