= Jo Chun-ryong =

North Korean politician

- 조춘룡

Candidate member of the Politburo of the WPK
- Incumbent
- Assumed office 2019
- General Secretary: Kim Jong Un

Personal details
- Party: Workers' Party of Korea

Jo Chun-ryong (Korean: 조춘룡) is a North Korean politician. Since 2019 he is a candidate member of the Politburo of the Central Committee of the Workers' Party of Korea. He is former member of the National Defense Commission.

== Biography ==
He was elected a member of the National Defense Commission at the first meeting of the 13th convocation of the Supreme People's Assembly held on April 9, 2014. As the successor to Hakusei Feng, who retired without being elected to the National Defense Commission at the same meeting, he is believed to have been appointed the chairman of the second economic committee of the WPK Munitions Industry Department, who became responsible for ballistic missile production. Prior to the election of the National Defense Commissioner, the history is unknown, but it is highly likely that South Korean government officials have long been involved in missile-related departments for Zhao Chun-Long, having served as the Deputy Chairman of the Second Economic Commission and the Director General of Missiles. At the fourth meeting of the 13th Supreme People's Assembly held on June 29, 2016, he was not elected to the newly established State Affairs Commission which succeeded the National Defense Commission.

At the Party Central Committee plenum meeting held on April 10, 2019, he was elected as a candidate member of the 7th Politburo of the 7th Central Committee.
