= Ri Yong-gil =

North Korean army officer (born 1952)

Vice Marshal Ri Yong-gil
- 리영길
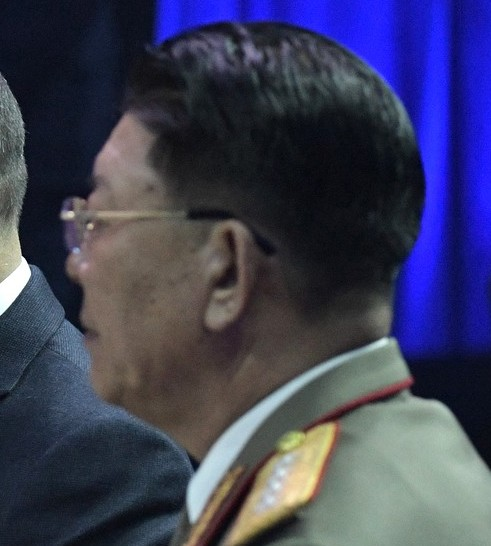
- Ri at the 2019 Kim–Putin meeting

Vice Chairman of the Central Military Commission
- Incumbent
- Assumed office 31 December 2022
- Chairman: Kim Jong Un
- Preceded by: Pak Jong-chon

Chief of the General Staff
- Incumbent
- Assumed office 10 August 2023
- Preceded by: Park Su-il
- In office August 2013 – January 2016
- Preceded by: Kim Kyok-sik
- Succeeded by: Ri Myong-su
- In office 4 June 2018 – 6 September 2019
- Preceded by: Ri Myong-su
- Succeeded by: Pak Jong-chon

Minister of Defence
- In office 29 September 2021 – 31 December 2022
- Preceded by: Kim Jong-gwan
- Succeeded by: Kang Sun-nam

Minister of Social Security
- In office January 2021 – July 2021
- Preceded by: Kim Jong-ho
- Succeeded by: Kim Jong-ho

Personal details
- Born: 1952 (age 73–74) North Korea
- Party: Workers' Party of Korea

Military service
- Allegiance: North Korea
- Branch/service: Korean People's Army
- Years of service: 1969–present
- Rank: Ch'asu (Vice Marshal)
- Commands: 3rd Army Corps 2002 to 2007; 5th Army Corps 2007 to 2012

Korean name
- Hangul: 리영길
- Hanja: 李永吉
- RR: Ri Yeonggil
- MR: Ri Yŏnggil

Ri Yong-gil (Korean: 리영길, born 1952) is a North Korean military officer who is currently a vice chairman of the Central Military Commission of the Workers' Party of Korea and the Chief of the General Staff.

== Career ==
Ri was made a Lieutenant General in April 2002 and given command of the forward-deployed 3rd Army Corps from 2002 to 2007, and later the 5th Army Corps from 2007 to 2012. He was believed to have been in his 60s when appointed to his position as a general in 2013.

He was promoted to Colonel General (Sangjang) and elected an alternate member of the Central Committee of the Workers' Party of Korea in 2010. He was promoted to chief of the General Staff Operations Bureau in late 2012, in charge of coordinating KPA corps commanders and reporting to the chief of General Staff and the Supreme Command. Ri was appointed Chief of the General Staff of the Korean People's Army in August 2013 as well as promoted to general around the same time.

In early February 2016, the South Korean news agency Yonhap News Agency reported that Ri had recently been executed on charges of corruption and forming a political faction. The unconfirmed rumour was widely circulated in mass media, but it was announced during the May 2016 Party Congress that Ri had been appointed a member of the Central Committee of the North's ruling Workers’ Party, as well as its Central Military Commission. General Ri was named an alternate member of the Politburo. As of April 2017, state media identified Ri as first deputy chief of the General Staff and director of the General Operations Bureau of the Korean People's Army. On the 27th of July 2018 KCNA reported that the general was again promoted to 4 star general and again Chief of the General Staff of Korean People Army, until 2019. After that he served as a party department director.

He was reelected to the Politburo following the 8th Party Congress in January 2021 as the new minister of Social Security. He was later moved to minister of Defense, joining also the State Affairs Commission in September of the same year.

On 14 April 2022, he was promoted to Vice Marshal of the KPA by the Central Military Commission of the Workers' Party of Korea. On 31 December 2022, he was appointed as a vice chairman of the Central Military Commission, replacing Pak Jong-chon. He was also reappointed as the Chief of the General Staff on 10 August 2023, succeeding Park Su-il.

== Sanctions ==
On 22 March 2021, the Council of the European Union imposed a set of restrictive measures against Ri giving the reason for listing: "As Head of the Ministry of Social Security, Ri Yong Gil is responsible for serious human rights violations in the DPRK, in particular torture and other cruel, inhuman or degrading treatment or punishment, extrajudicial, summary or arbitrary executions and killings, enforced disappearance of persons, and arbitrary arrests or detentions, as well as widespread forced labour and sexual violence against women."

== Awards and honors ==
A picture of Ri shows him wearing the ribbons of all decorations awarded to him.

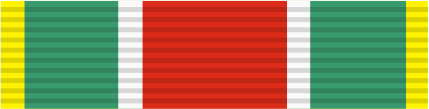

Political offices
Preceded by Kim Jong-ho	Minister of Social Security; 2021	Succeeded by Jang Jong-nam
Preceded by Kim Jong-gwan	Minister of National Defence; 2021–2022	Succeeded by Kang Sun-nam
Military offices
Preceded by Kim Myong-guk	Chief of the General Staff Operations Bureau; 2012–2013	Succeeded by Pyon In-son
Preceded by Kim Kyok-sik	Chief of the General Staff of the Korean People's Army; 2013–2016	Succeeded by Ri Myong-su
Preceded by Ri Myong-su	Chief of the General Staff of the Korean People's Army; 2018–2019	Succeeded by Pak Jong-chon
Preceded by Park Su-il	Chief of the General Staff of the Korean People's Army; 2023–present	Incumbent
