= Korean People's Army =

Combined military forces of North Korea

- Emblem of the Korean People's Army (2023)

- Flag of the Korean People's Army (2023-present)
- Founded: 25 April 1932; 94 years ago
- Current form: 8 February 1948; 78 years ago
- Service branches: Korean People's Army Ground Force; Korean People's Navy; Korean People's Army Air Force; Korean People's Army Strategic Force; Korean People's Army Special Operations Forces; Missile Administration
- Headquarters: State Affairs Commission, Pyongyang

Leadership
- Governing body: Central Military Commission (CMC)
- CMC leadership: Chairman: Marshal Kim Jong Un Vice Chairman: Marshal Pak Jong Chon
- Minister of Defence: Army General Kim Song-gi (take office at the end of August 2026, replacing Army General No Kwang-chol)
- Chief of the General Staff Department: Vice Marshal Ri Yong-gil (3rd term, from August 2023)
- First Vice Director of the General Political Bureau: Lieutenant General Yu Kwang-u

Personnel
- Military age: 17–30
- Conscription: 18
- Active personnel: 1,320,000 (ranked 4th)
- Reserve personnel: 560,000+

Expenditure
- Budget: Approximately US$4 billion (2019)
- Percent of GDP: Approximately 26% (2019)

Industry
- Domestic suppliers: Korea Mining and Development Trading Corporation; Nampo Kangso Missile Factory; No 28 Shipyard Najin; Nampo Shipyard
- Foreign suppliers: Russia; Soviet Union (historical)

Related articles
- Ranks: Comparative military ranks of Korea; Military ranks of North Korea

- Korean People's Army
- Hangul: 조선인민군
- Hanja: 朝鮮人民軍
- RR: Joseon inmingun
- MR: Chosŏn inmin'gun

The Korean People's Army (KPA; Korean: 조선인민군; MR: Chosŏn inmin'gun) encompasses the combined military forces of North Korea and the armed wing of the Workers' Party of Korea (WPK). The KPA consists of five branches: the Ground Force, the Naval Force, the Air Force, the Strategic Force, and the Special Operations Forces. It is commanded by the WPK Central Military Commission, which is chaired by the WPK general secretary, and the president of the State Affairs; both posts are currently headed by Kim Jong Un.

The KPA considers its primary adversaries to be the Republic of Korea Armed Forces and United States Forces Korea, across the Korean Demilitarized Zone, as it has since the Armistice Agreement of July 1953. As of 2021 it is the second largest military organisation in the world, with 29.9% of the North Korean population actively serving, in reserve, or in a paramilitary capacity.

== History ==
The KPA's first flag, used in 1948

The KPA's flag from 1992 to 1993. Since this flag's retirement in 1993, the KPA has not had its own dedicated flag.

The flag of the KPA Ground Force (in use from 1993 to 2023) was sometimes used to represent the entire Korean People's Army.

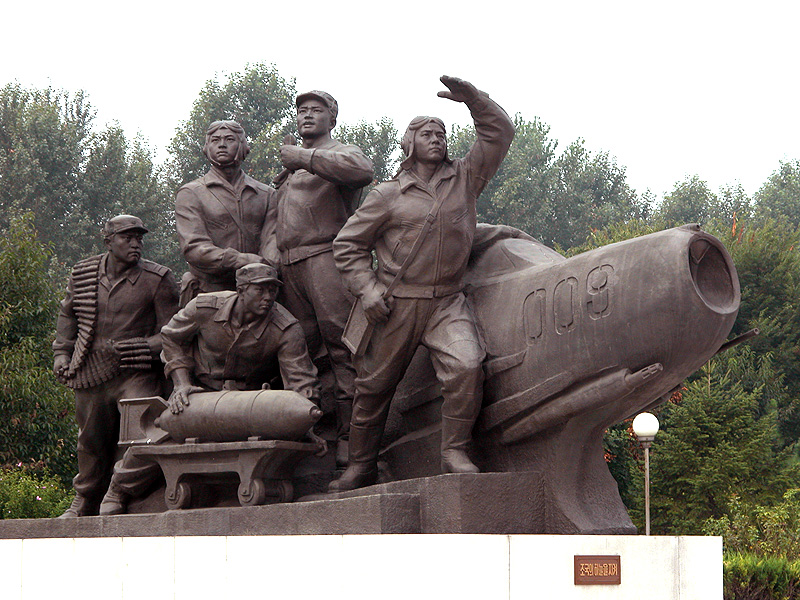
A monument in Pyongyang, depicting North Korean airmen and a MiG fighter

=== Korean Volunteer Army, 1939–1948 ===
In 1939, the Korean Volunteer Army (KVA), was formed in Yan'an, China. The two individuals responsible for the army were Kim Tu-bong and Mu Chong. At the same time, a school was established near Yan'an for training military and political leaders for a future independent Korea. By 1945, the KVA had grown to approximately 1,000 men, mostly Korean deserters from the Imperial Japanese Army. During this period, the KVA fought alongside the Chinese communist Northeast Anti-Japanese United Army from which it drew its arms and ammunition. After the defeat of the Japanese, the KVA accompanied the Chinese Communist Party forces into eastern Jilin, intending to gain recruits from ethnic Koreans in China, particularly from Yanbian, and then enter Korea.

=== Soviet Korean Units ===
Just after World War II ended and during the Soviet Union's occupation of the part of Korea north of the 38th Parallel, the Soviet 25th Army headquarters in Pyongyang issued a statement ordering all armed resistance groups in the northern part of the peninsula to disband on 12 October 1945. Two thousand Koreans with previous experience in the Soviet Red Army were sent to various locations around the country to organise constabulary forces with permission from Soviet military headquarters, and the force was created on 21 October 1945.

=== Formation of National Army ===
The headquarters felt a need for a separate unit for security around railways, and the formation of the unit was announced on 11 January 1946. That unit was activated on 15 August of the same year to supervise existing security forces and creation of the national armed forces.

Military institutes such as the Pyongyang Academy (became No. 2 KPA Officers School in Jan. 1949) and the Central Constabulary Academy (became KPA Military Academy in Dec. 1948) soon followed for the education of political and military officers for the new armed forces.

After the military was organised and facilities to educate its new recruits were constructed, the Constabulary Discipline Corps was reorganised into the Korean People's Army General Headquarters. The previously semi-official units became military regulars with the distribution of Soviet uniforms, badges, and weapons that followed the inception of the headquarters.

The State Security Department, a forerunner to the Ministry of People's Defence, was created as part of the Interim People's Committee on 4 February 1948. The formal creation of the Korean People's Army was announced four days later on 8 February, the day after the Fourth Plenary Session of the People's Assembly approved the plan to separate the roles of the military and those of the police, seven months before the government of the Democratic People's Republic of Korea was proclaimed on 9 September 1948. In addition, the Ministry of Defence was established, which controlled a central guard battalion, two divisions, and an independent mixed and combined arms brigade.

=== Conflicts and events ===
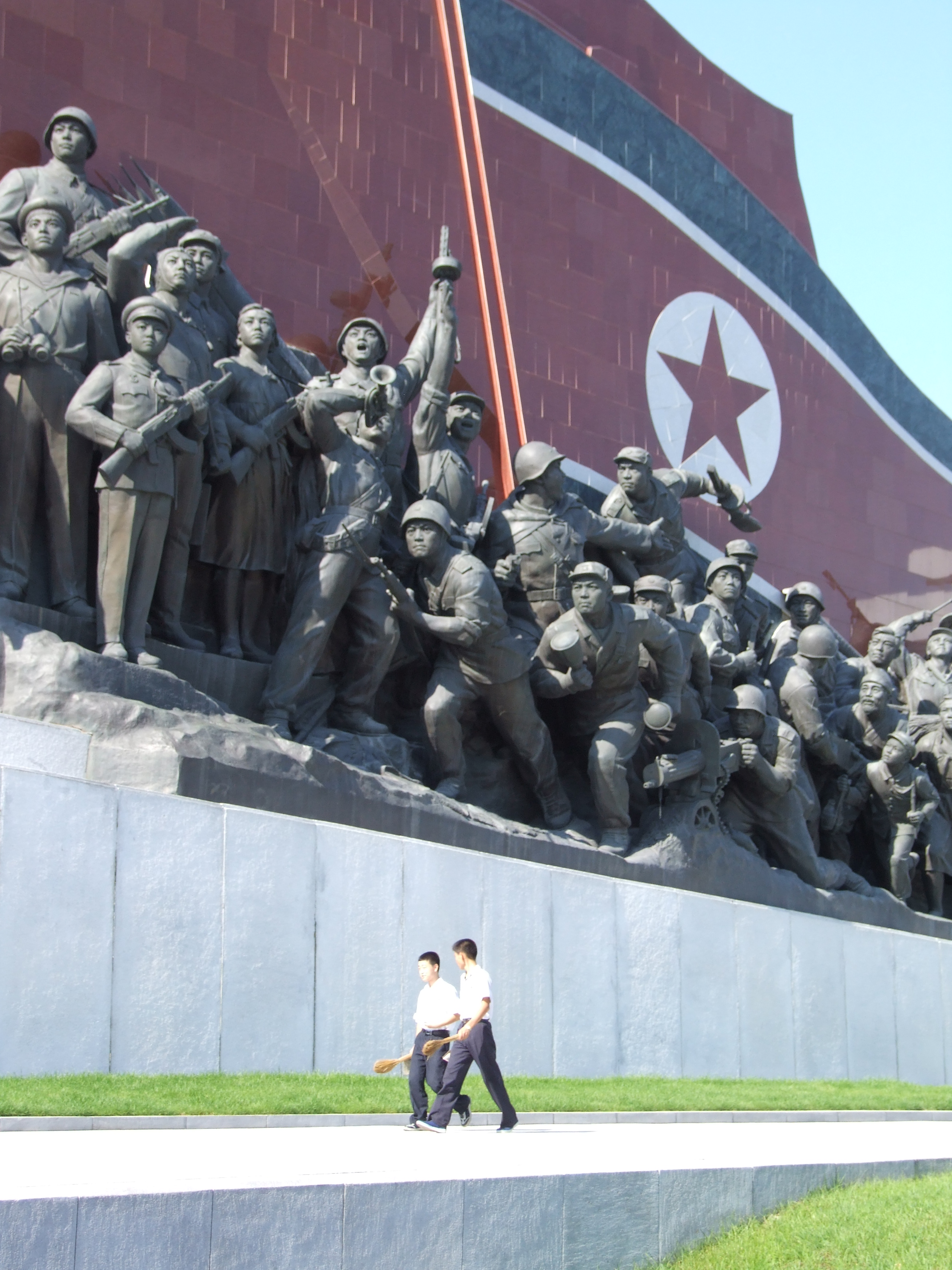
The Memorial of Soldiers at the Mansudae Grand Monument

Before the outbreak of the Korean War, Soviet leader Joseph Stalin equipped the KPA with modern armaments. During the opening phases of the Korean War in 1950, the KPA quickly drove South Korean forces south and captured Seoul, only to lose 70,000 of their 100,000-strong army in the autumn after U.S. amphibious landings at the Battle of Incheon and a subsequent drive to the Yalu River. On 4 November, China openly staged a military intervention. The KPA subsequently played a secondary and minor role to the Chinese People's Volunteer Army in the remainder of the conflict. By the time of the Armistice in 1953, the KPA had sustained 290,000 casualties and lost 90,000 men as POWs.

In 1953, the Military Armistice Commission (MAC) was able to oversee and enforce the terms of the armistice. The Neutral Nations Supervisory Commission (NNSC), made up of delegations from Czechoslovakia, Poland, Sweden and Switzerland, carried out inspections to ensure implementation of the terms of the Armistice that prevented reinforcements or new weapons being brought into Korea.

Soviet thinking on the strategic scale was replaced in December 1962 with the Maoist concept of a people's war. Along with the mechanisation of some infantry units, more emphasis was put on light weapons, high-angle indirect fire, night fighting, and sea denial.

In the fall of 2024, amidst the Russo-Ukrainian war, elements of the Korean People's Army were clandestinely sent to Russia to bolster Russian forces fighting against Ukraine in the Kursk offensive. The force, which included Korean People's Army Special Operations Forces, was said to have consisted of 10,000 men fighting in Russian uniforms and under Russian command. Initially denied by both Russia and North Korea, the operation was publicly revealed after Russia claimed the last Ukrainian forces were driven out of Kursk Oblast.

== Date of establishment history ==
Until 1977, the official date of establishment of the Korean People's Army was 8 February 1948. In the 1940s, North Korean historiography started to claim that Kim Il Sung established an anti-Japanese guerrilla army, the Korean People's Revolutionary Army, on 25 April 1932. North Korea claims that the KPRA was officially transformed into the People's Army in anticipation of the government's establishment on February 8, 1948. In 1978, April 25 was designated as the "Anniversary of the Founding of the People's Army" and North Korea held large-scale commemorative events. The reason for changing the date of the founding of the People's Army in North Korea is that Kim Il Sung organised the "Anti-Japanese People's Guerrilla Unit", a unit of the Anti-Japanese People's Army, in Ando County, Manchuria, on April 25, 1932, which later developed into the "Korean People's Revolutionary Army" and played a significant role in the anti-Japanese struggle. This is based on the "Kim Il Sung revolutionary tradition." Both of these are celebrated as army days, with decennial anniversaries treated as major celebrations, except from 1978 to 2014 when only the 1932 anniversary was celebrated. By 2019, the KPA's date of establishment had been reverted to 8 February 1948.

== Organisation ==
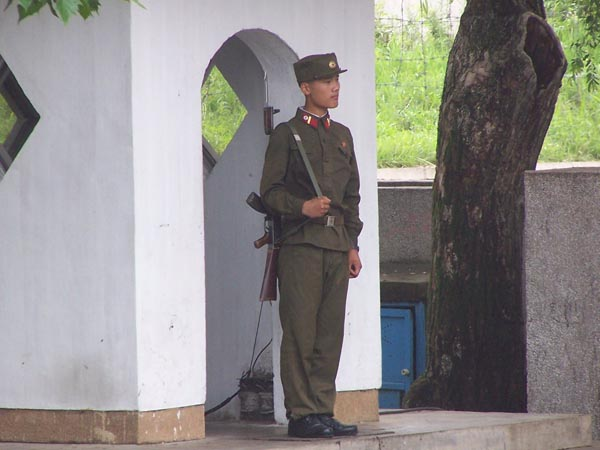
A North Korean soldier at the DMZ, 2005

=== Commission and leadership ===
The charter of the WPK states that the KPA is "the revolutionary armed forces of the Workers' Party of Korea and shall uphold the guidance of the party". The charter also states that the WPK Central Military Commission (CMC) is "the party's supreme institution on military guidance" and has "command over the armed forces of the republic". The CMC is headed by the general secretary of the WPK, who is also CMC chairman ex officio. The state constitution also names the president of the State Affairs as the commander-in-chief of the armed forces, and stipulates that the mission of the armed forces is to "defend unto death the Party Central Committee headed by the great Comrade Kim Jong Un".

Almost all officers of the KPA began their military careers as privates; only very few people are admitted to a military academy without prior service. The result is supposed to be an egalitarian military system where officers are familiar with the life of a military private and "military nobility" is all but nonexistent.

==== History ====
Since 1990, numerous and dramatic transformations within North Korea have led to the current command and control structure. The details of the majority of these changes are simply unknown to the world. What little is known indicates that many changes were the natural result of the deaths of the aging leadership including Kim Il Sung (July 1994), Minister of People's Armed Forces O Jin-u (February 1995) and Minister of Defence Choe Kwang (February 1997).

The vast majority of changes were undertaken to secure the power and position of Kim Jong Il. Formerly, what is now the State Affairs Commission - formerly the National Defence Commission - was part of the Central People's Committee (CPC) while the Ministry of Defence, from 1982 onward, was under direct presidential control. At the Eighteenth session of the sixth Central People's Committee, held on 23 May 1990, the SAC became established as its own independent commission, rising to the same status as the CPC (now the Cabinet of North Korea) and not subordinated to it, as was the case before. Concurrent with this, Kim Jong Il was appointed first vice-chairman of the National Defence Commission. The following year, on 24 December 1991, Kim Jong Il was appointed Supreme Commander of the Korean People's Army. Four months later, on 20 April 1992, Kim Jong Il was awarded the rank of Marshal and his father, in virtue of being the KPA's founding commander in chief, became grand marshal as a result and one year later he became the chairman of the National Defence Commission, by now under Supreme People's Assembly control under the then 1992 constitution as amended.

Within the KPA, between December 1991 and December 1995, nearly 800 high officers (out of approximately 1,200) received promotions and preferential assignments. Three days after Kim Jong Il became Marshal, eight generals were appointed to the rank of Vice-Marshal. In April 1997, on the 85th anniversary of Kim Il Sung's birthday, Kim Jong Il promoted 127 general and admiral grade officers. The following April he ordered the promotions of another 22 generals and flag officers. Along with these changes, many KPA officers were appointed to influential positions within the WPK. These promotions continue today, simultaneous with the celebration of Kim Il Sung's birthday and the KPA anniversary celebrations every April and since recently in July to honour the end of the Korean War. Under Kim Jong Il's leadership, political officers dispatched from the party monitored every move of a general's daily life, according to analysts similar to the work of Soviet political commissars during the early and middle years of the military establishment.

Under Kim Jong Il, the KPA effectively exercised full control of both the Politburo and the CMC, the KPA General Political and General Staff Departments and the Ministry of Defence, all having KPA representatives with a minimum general officer rank. During this period the primary path for command and control of the KPA extended through the National Defence Commission which was led by its chairman Kim Jong Il until 2011, to the Ministry of Defence and its General Staff Department. From there on, command and control flowed to the various bureaus and operational units. A secondary path, to ensure political control of the military establishment, extended through the CMC. The party's power was diluted; the CMC was stripped of its authority to command the KPA in 2010. The KPA party committee outranked provincial party committees, while KPA's General Political Bureau (GPB) had equal status to the WPK Central Committee.

The organisation of the KPA leadership was reformed again under Kim Jong Un. The Supreme People's Assembly (SPA) amended the constitution in June 2016, abolishing the National Defence Commission (NDC) except in times of war, and replacing it with the State Affairs Commission (SAC), which was named the "supreme policy-oriented leadership body of State power". Kim became the chairman of the State Affairs Commission on 29 June 2016. These amendments marked the decrease of the military's influence, with the newly established SAC including more civilian and less military members than the NDC. The constitution was further amended in 2019. The constitution now stipulated that the mission of North Korea's armed forces was to "defend unto death the Party Central Committee headed by the great Comrade Kim Jong Un". The chairman of the State Affairs Commission was named as the commander-in-chief of the armed forces as well as the "supreme representative of all the Korean people".

The 8th WPK Congress held in 2021 marked the consolidation of WPK control over the army, as well as a further decrease in the army's power; the number of military delegates dropped from 719 in the 7th Congress to 408. Politburo members increased from 28 to 30, though incumbent military elite membership decreased from eight to six. "Military-first policy" was also removed from the charter, being replaced by "people-first politics". During the speech to the Congress, Kim Jong Un did not mention "army of the leader" to refer to the KPA, as it has been referred as before, instead naming it as an "army of the party", thus moving the party-army relations in the country closer to the ones typically found in other socialist states.

The influence of the KPA Party Committee and the GPB was decreased; with the committee now ranking equal to provincial party committees. The GPB was also no longer equal to the Central Committee, while the CMC was again given effective command of the armed forces. The Military Affairs Department of the WPK Central Committee was abolished, with its functions being transferred to the Department of Military-Political Leadership.

=== Ground force formations ===
- I Corps (Hoeyang County, Kangwon Province)
- II Corps (Pyongsan County, North Hwanghae Province)
- III Corps (Nampo, South Pyongan Province)
- IV Corps (Haeju, South Hwanghae Province)
- V Corps (Sepo County, Kangwon Province)
- VII Corps (Hamhung, South Hamgyong Province)
- Pyongyang Defense Command
- XII Corps
- IX Corps (Chongjin, North Hamgyong Province)
- X Corps (Hyesan, Ryanggang Province)
- XI Corps (Tokchon, South Pyongan Province)
- Mechanised infantry divisions:
  - 108th Division
  - 425th Division
  - 806th Division
  - 815th Division
- 820th Tank Corps

=== Conscription and terms of service ===
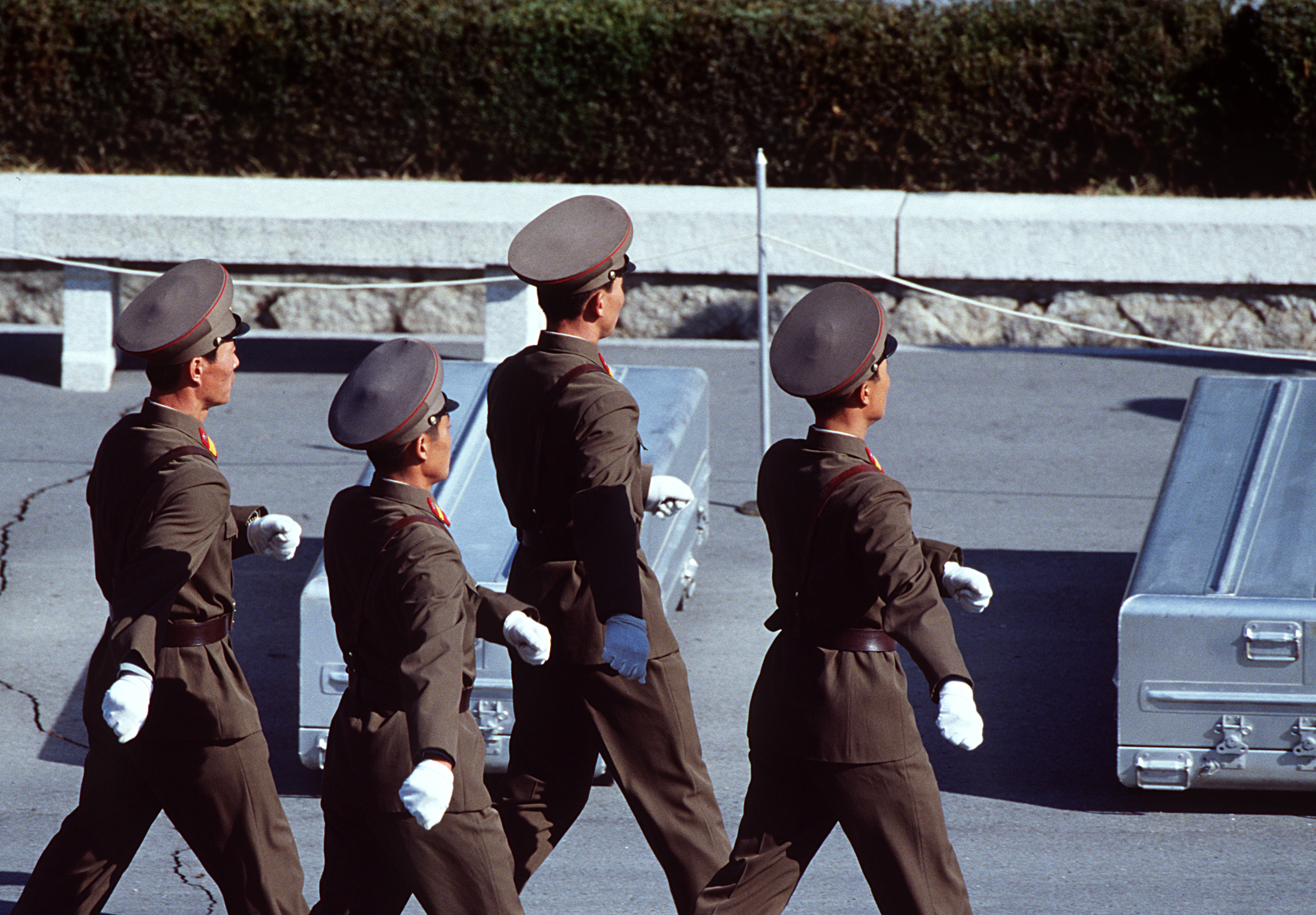
North Korean soldiers at Panmunjom

North Korea has conscription for males for 10 years. Females are conscripted up until the age of 23. Article 86 of the North Korean Constitution states: "National defence is the supreme duty and honour of citizens. Citizens shall defend the country and serve in the armed forces as required by law."

KPA soldiers serve three years of military service in the KPA, which also runs its own factories, farms and trading arms.

==== Paramilitary organisations ====
The Red Youth Guards are the youth cadet corps of the KPA for secondary level and university level students. Every Saturday, they hold mandatory 4-hour military training drills, and have training activities on and off campus to prepare them for military service when they turn 18 or after graduation, as well as for contingency measures in peacetime.

Under the Ministry of Social Security and the wartime control of the Ministry of Defence, and formerly the Korean People's Security Forces, the Korean People's Social Security Forces (KPSSF) forms the national gendarmerie and civil defence force of the KPA. The KPSSF has its units in various fields like civil defence, traffic management, civil disturbance control, and local security. It has its own special forces units. The service shares the ranks of the KPA (with the exception of Marshals) but wears different uniforms.

The Reserve Military Training Units or RMTUs constitute the primary reserve force component of the KPA.

The Worker-Peasant Red Guards (WPRG; 로농적위군), also translated as Workers and Peasants' Red Militia (WPRM), is a paramilitary force in North Korea. It is the largest civil defence force in North Korea. It is not only under State Affairs Commission (until 2016 National Defence Commission) and Ministry of Defence control, but is also attached to the Workers' Party of Korea under its Military Leadership Department. It is thus responsible to the Supreme Leader in his capacity as Supreme Commander of the Armed Forces. The militia is organised on a provincial/city/town/village level, and structured on a brigade, battalion, company, and platoon basis. The militia maintains infantry small arms, with some mortars, field guns and anti-aircraft guns and even modernised older equipment such as multiple rocket launchers like the BM-13 and older Ural D-62 motorcycles, although some units are unarmed indicating status as logistics and medical units. Its strength is estimated at 5 million personnel.

=== Budget and commercial interests ===
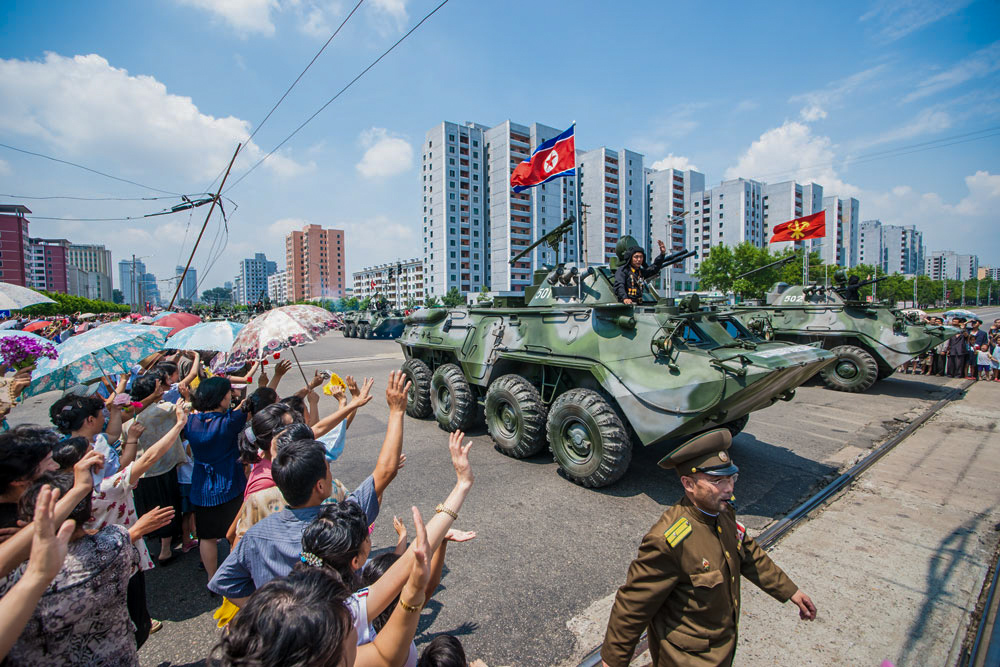
Korean People's Army M-2012 APC (a domestic copy of BTR-80) on parade

The KPA's annual budget is approximately US$6 billion. In 2009, the U.S. Institute for Science and International Security reported that North Korea may possess fissile material for around two to nine nuclear warheads. The North Korean Songun ("Military First") policy elevates the KPA to the primary position in the government and society.

According to North Korea's state news agency, military expenditures for 2010 made up 15.8 percent of the state budget. Most analyses of North Korea's defence sector, however, estimate that defence spending constitutes between one-quarter and one-third of all government spending. As of 2003, according to the International Institute of Strategic Studies, North Korea's defence budget consumed some 25 percent of central government spending. In the mid-1970s and early 1980s, according to figures released by the Polish Arms Control and Disarmament Agency, between 32 and 38 percent of central government expenditures went towards defence.

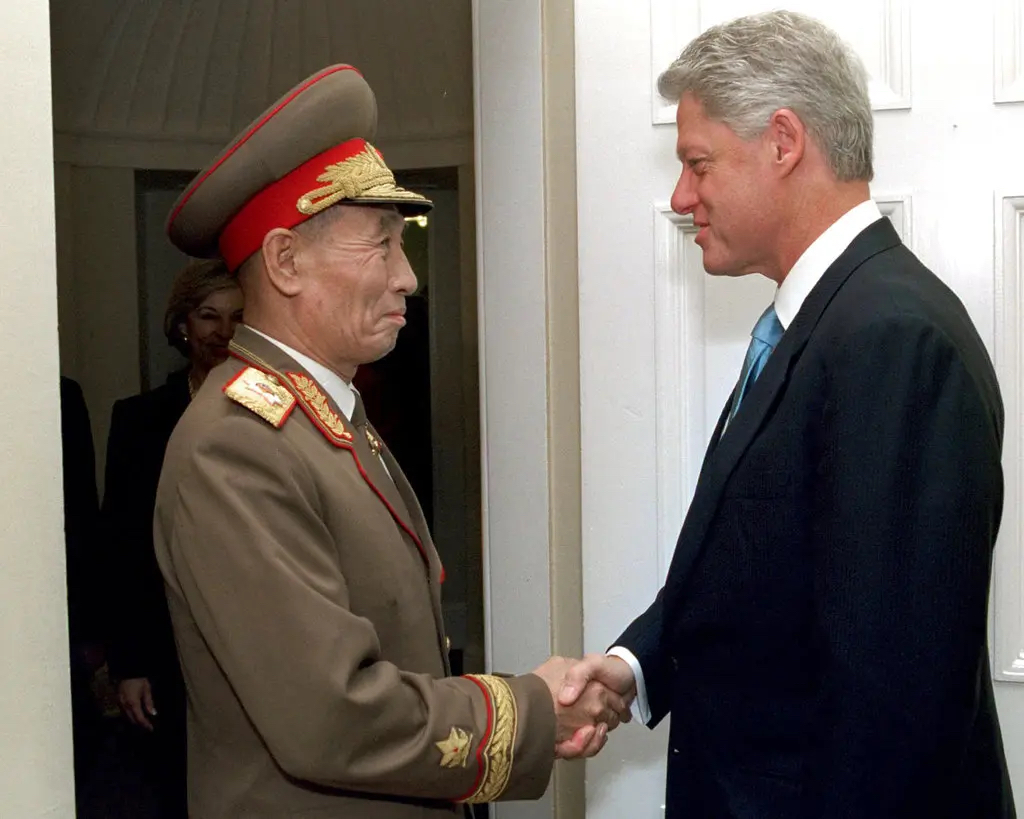
Vice Marshal Jo Myong-rok meets Bill Clinton at the White House, October 2000

North Korea sells missiles and military equipment to many countries worldwide. In April 2009, the United Nations named the Korea Mining and Development Trading Corporation (KOMID) as North Korea's primary arms dealer and main exporter of equipment related to ballistic missiles and conventional weapons. It also named Korea Ryonbong as a supporter of North Korea's military related sales.

Historically, North Korea has assisted a vast number of communist, socialist, and Islamist groups in more than 62 countries. A cumulative total of more than 5,000 foreign personnel have been trained in North Korea, and over 7,000 military advisers, primarily from the Reconnaissance General Bureau, have been dispatched to some forty-seven countries. Some of the organisations which received North Korean aid include the Polisario Front, Janatha Vimukthi Peramuna, the Communist Party of Thailand, the Palestine Liberation Organization and the Islamic Revolutionary Guard Corps. The Zimbabwean Fifth Brigade received its initial training from KPA instructors. North Korean troops allegedly saw combat during the Libyan–Egyptian War and the Angolan Civil War. Up to 200 KPAF pilots took part in the Vietnam War, scoring several kills against U.S. aircraft. Two KPA anti-aircraft artillery regiments were sent to North Vietnam as well.

North Korean instructors trained Hezbollah fighters in guerrilla warfare tactics around 2004, prior to the Second Lebanon War. During the Syrian Civil War, Arabic-speaking KPA officers may have assisted the Syrian Arab Army in military operations planning and have supervised artillery bombardments in the Battle of Aleppo.

== Service branches ==
=== Ground Force ===
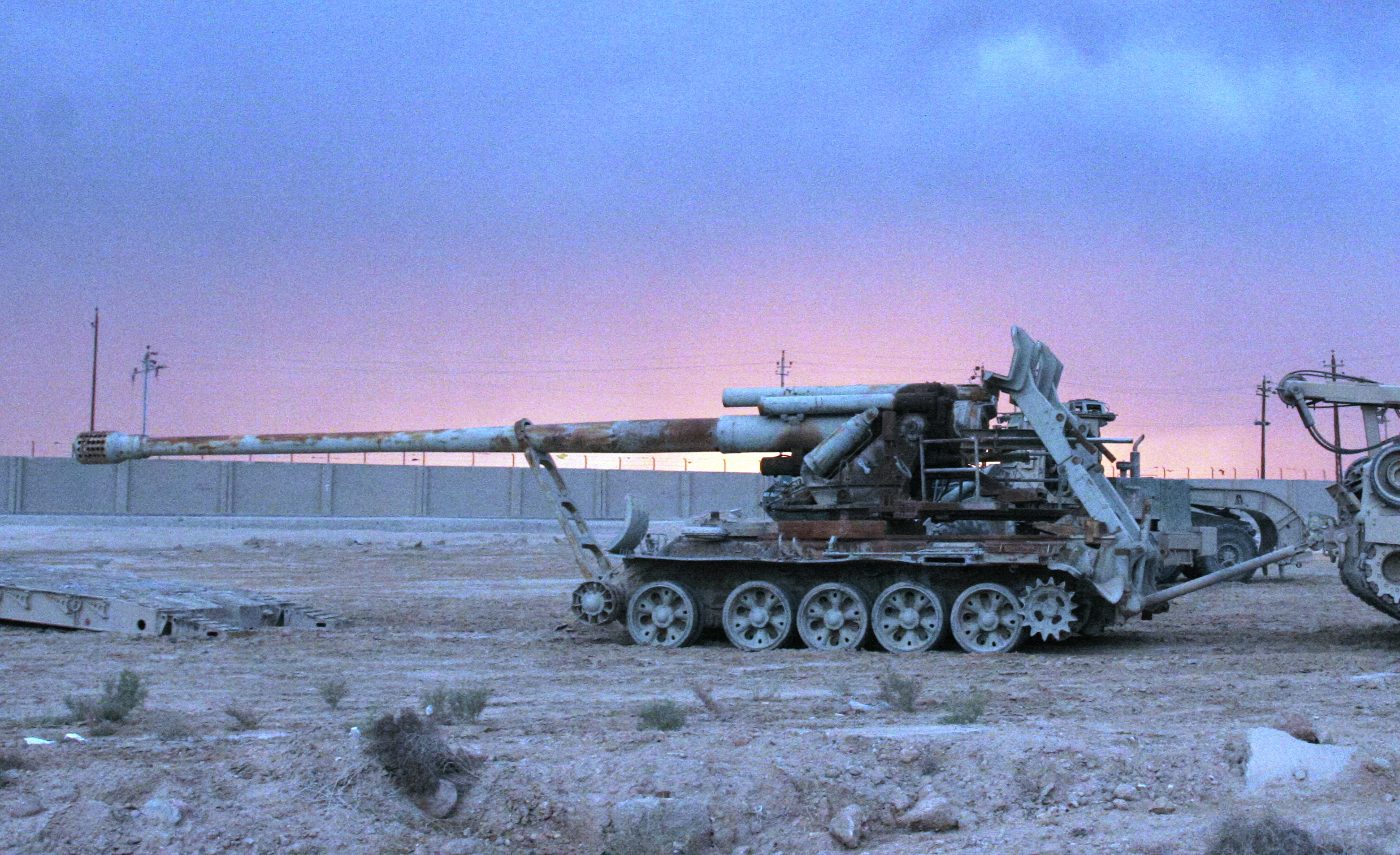
Koksan, one of North Korea's principal heavy artillery pieces. This example was photographed in Iraq.

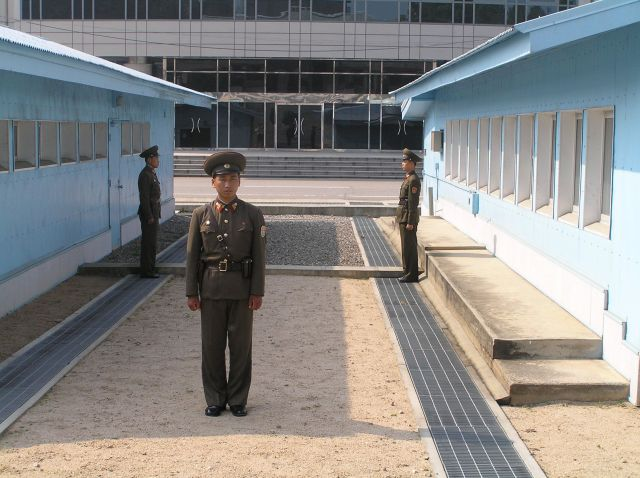
North Korean soldiers standing at the Joint Security Area between the blue buildings

The Korean People's Army Ground Force (KPAGF) is the main branch of the Korean People's Army responsible for land-based military operations. It is the de facto army of North Korea.

=== Naval Force ===
The Korean People's Army Naval Force (KPANF) is organised into two fleets (West Fleet and East Fleet, the latter being the larger of the two) which, owing to the limited range and general disrepair of their vessels, are not able to support each other, let alone meet for joint operations. The East Fleet is headquartered at T'oejo-dong and the West Fleet at Nampho. A number of training, shipbuilding and maintenance units and a naval air wing report directly to Naval Command Headquarters at Pyongyang.

=== Air and Anti-Air Force ===
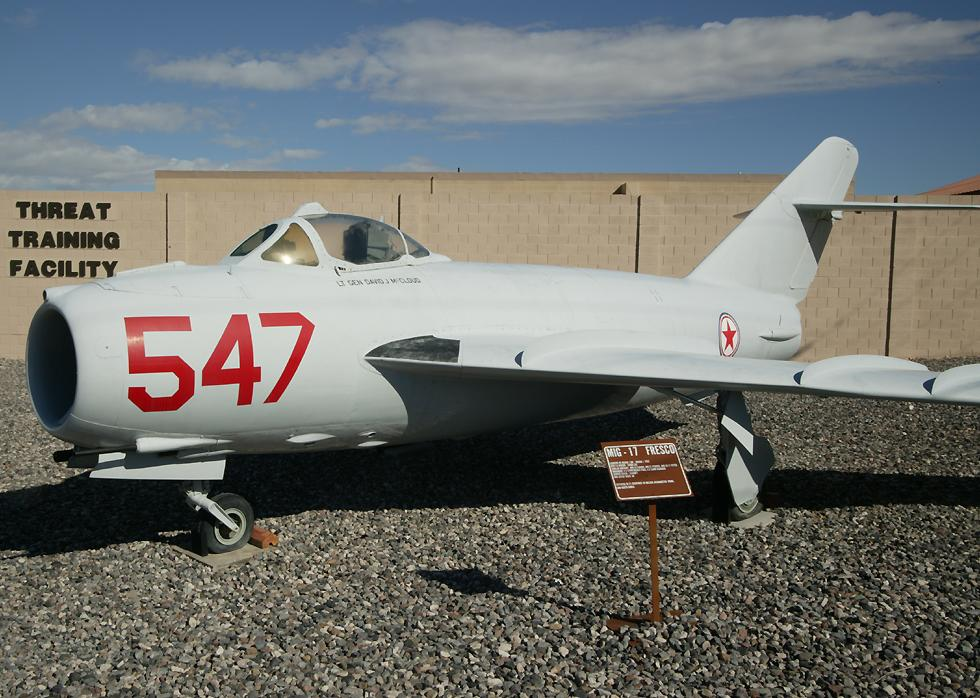
A former Indonesian Lim-5 on display in the United States in North Korean markings

The Korean People's Army Air Force (KPAF) is also responsible for North Korea's air and space defence forces through the use of anti-aircraft artillery, surface-to-air missiles (SAM) and satellites. Until April 2022, it was known as the KPA Air and Anti-Air Force. While much of the equipment is outdated, the high saturation of multilayered, overlapping, mutually supporting air defence sites provides a formidable challenge to enemy air attacks.

=== Strategic Force ===
The Strategic Force is a major division of the KPA that controls North Korea's nuclear and conventional strategic missiles. It is mainly equipped with surface-to-surface missiles of Soviet and Chinese design, as well as locally developed long-range missiles.

=== Special Operation Force ===
The Korean People's Army Special Operation Force (KPASOF) is an asymmetric force with a total troop size of 200,000. Since the Korean War, it has continued to play a role of concentrating infiltration of troops into the territory of South Korea and conducting sabotage.

== Capabilities ==
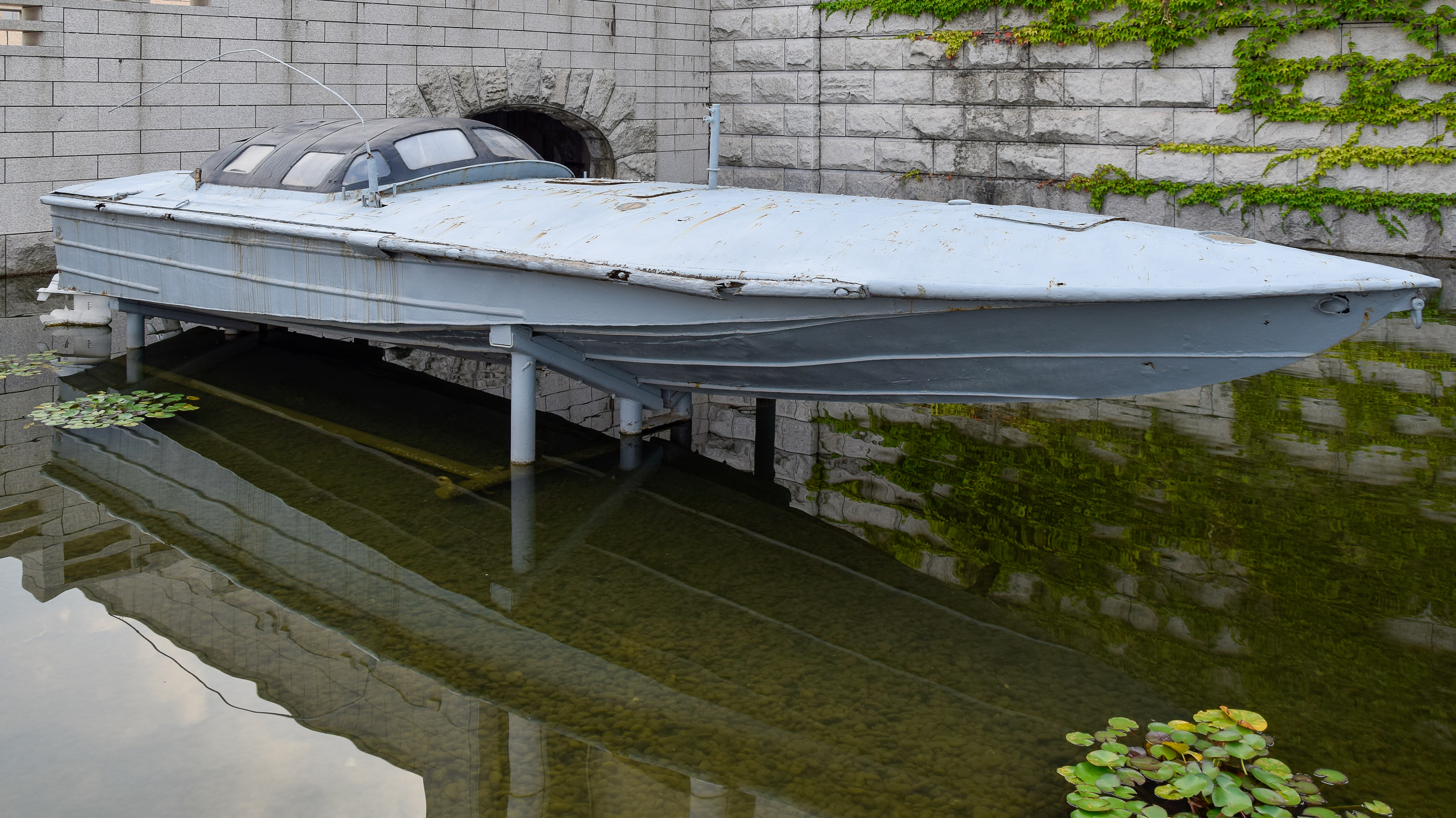
A semi-submersible infiltration craft used by North Korean special forces in the 1980s

After the Korean War, North Korea maintained a powerful, but smaller military force than that of South Korea. In 1967 the KPA forces of about 345,000 were much smaller than the South Korean ground forces of about 585,000. North Korea's relative isolation and economic plight starting from the 1980s has now tipped the balance of military power into the hands of the better-equipped South Korean military. In response to this predicament, North Korea relies on asymmetric warfare techniques and unconventional weaponry to achieve parity against high-tech enemy forces. North Korea is reported to have developed a wide range of technologies towards this end, such as stealth paint to conceal ground targets, midget submarines and human torpedoes, blinding laser weapons, and probably has a chemical weapons programme and is likely to possess a stockpile of chemical weapons. The Korean People's Army operates ZM-87 anti-personnel lasers, which are banned under the United Nations Protocol on Blinding Laser Weapons.

Since the 1980s, North Korea has also been actively developing its own cyber warfare capabilities. As of 2014, the secretive Bureau 121 – the elite North Korean cyber warfare unit – comprises approximately 1,800 highly trained hackers. In December 2014, the Bureau was accused of hacking Sony Pictures and making threats, leading to the cancellation of The Interview, a political satire comedy film based on the assassination of Kim Jong Un. The Korean People's Army has also made advances in electronic warfare by developing GPS jammers. Current models include vehicle-mounted jammers with a range of 50 kilometres (31 mi)–100 kilometres (62 mi). Jammers with a range of more than 100 km are being developed, along with electromagnetic pulse bombs. The Korean People's Army has also made attempts to jam South Korean military satellites. North Korea does not have satellites capable of obtaining satellite imagery useful for military purposes, and appears to use imagery from foreign commercial platforms.

Despite the general fuel and ammunition shortages for training, it is estimated that the wartime strategic reserves of food for the army are sufficient to feed the regular troops for 500 days, while fuel and ammunition – amounting to 1.5 million and 1.7 million tonnes respectively – are sufficient to wage a full-scale war for 100 days.

The KPA does not operate aircraft carriers, but has other means of power projection. Korean People's Air Force Il-76MD aircraft provide a strategic airlift capacity of 6,000 troops, while the Navy's sea lift capacity amounts to 15,000 troops. The Strategic Rocket Forces operate more than 1,000 ballistic missiles according to South Korean officials in 2010, although the U.S. Department of Defense reported in 2012 that North Korea has fewer than 200 missile launchers. North Korea acquired 12 Foxtrot class and Golf-II class missile submarines as scrap in 1993. Some analysts suggest that these have either been refurbished with the help of Russian experts or their launch tubes have been reverse-engineered and externally fitted to regular submarines or cargo ships. However the U.S. Department of Defense does not list them as active.

A photograph of Kim Jong Un receiving a briefing from his top generals on 29 March 2013 showed a list that purported to show that the military had a minimum of 40 submarines, 13 landing ships, 6 minesweepers, 27 support vessels and 1,852 aircraft.

The Korean People's Army operates a very large amount of equipment, including 4,100 tanks, 2,100 APCs, 8,500 field artillery pieces, 5,100 multiple rocket launchers, 11,000 air defence guns and some 10,000 MANPADS and anti-tank guided missiles in the Ground force; about 500 vessels in the Navy and 730 combat aircraft in the Air Force, of which 478 are fighters and 180 are bombers. North Korea also has the largest special forces in the world, as well as the largest submarine fleet. The equipment is a mixture of World War II vintage vehicles and small arms, widely proliferated Cold War technology, and more modern Soviet or locally produced weapons.

In March 2024, Kim Jong Un was pictured driving a newly developed tank alongside soldiers taking part in drills which the leader said was preparation for war.

North Korea possesses a vast array of long range artillery in shelters just north of the Korean Demilitarized Zone. It has been a long-standing cause for concern that a preemptive strike or retaliatory strike on Seoul using this arsenal of artillery north of the Demilitarized Zone would lead to a massive loss of life in Seoul. One estimate projected hundreds of thousands or possibly millions of fatalities if North Korea uses chemical or nuclear munitions. A RAND Corporation conducted an extensive study in 2020 on a range of potential artillery bombardment scenarios and concluded that a strike on Seoul alone could result in over 100,000 casualties in the first hour of bombardment.

== Military equipment ==
=== Weapons ===
The KPA possess a variety of Chinese and Soviet sourced equipment and weaponry, as well as locally produced versions and improvements of the former. Soldiers are mostly armed with indigenous Kalashnikov-type rifles as the standard issue weapon. Front line troops are issued the Type 88, while the older Type 58 assault rifle and Type 68A/B have been shifted to rear echelon or home guard units. A rifle of unknown nomenclature was seen during the 2017 Day of the Sun military parade, appearing to consist of a grenade launcher and a standard assault rifle, similar to the U.S. OICW or South Korean S&T Daewoo K11. North Korea generally designates rifles as "Type XX", similar to the Chinese naming system. On 15 November 2018, North Korea successfully tested a "newly developed ultramodern tactical weapon". Leader Kim Jong Un observed the test at the Academy of Defence Science and called it a "decisive turn" in bolstering the combat power of the North Korean army.

There is a Korean People's Army Military Hardware Museum located in Pyongyang that displays a range of the equipment used.

=== Chemical weapons ===
The U.S. Department of Defense believes North Korea probably has a chemical weapons programme and is likely to possess a stockpile of such weapons.

==== Nuclear capabilities ====
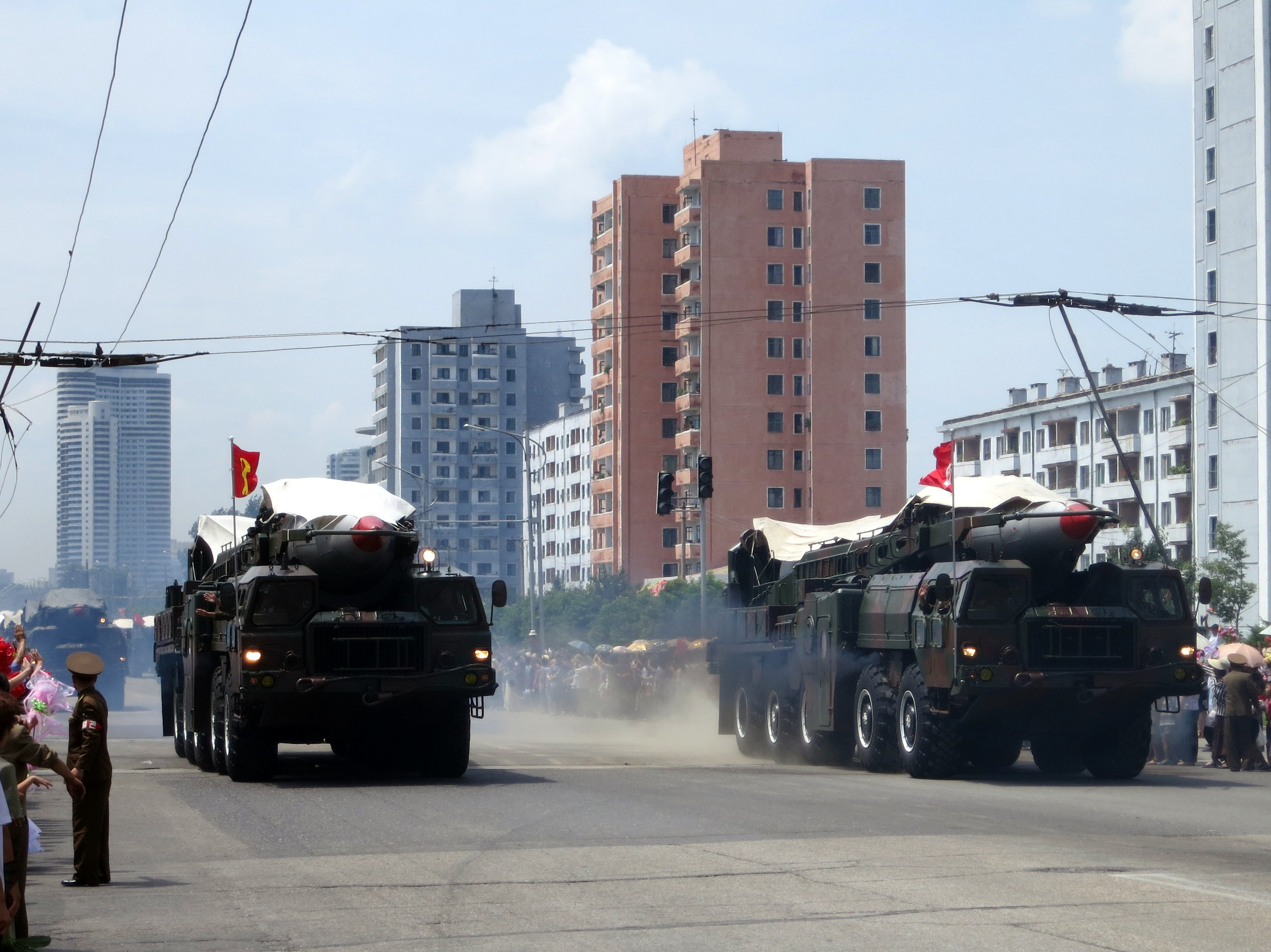
North Korean ballistic missiles

North Korea has tested a series of different missiles, including short-, medium-, intermediate-, and intercontinental-range, and submarine-launched ballistic missiles. Estimates of the country's nuclear stockpile vary: some experts, such as Hans M. Kristensen and Matt Korda believe Pyongyang may have assembled between twenty and thirty nuclear weapons, while U.S. intelligence believes the number to be between thirty and sixty. The regime conducted two tests of an intercontinental ballistic missile (ICBM) capable of carrying a large nuclear warhead in July 2017. The Pentagon confirmed North Korea's ICBM tests, and analysts estimate that the new missile has a potential range of 10,400 kilometres (6,500 miles) and, if fired on a flatter trajectory, could be capable of reaching mainland U.S. territory.

==== Nuclear tests ====
On 9 October 2006, the North Korean government announced that it had unsuccessfully attempted a nuclear test for the first time. Experts at the United States Geological Survey and Japanese seismological authorities detected an earthquake with a preliminary estimated magnitude of 4.3 from the site in North Korea, proving the official claims to be true.

North Korea also went on to claim that it had developed a nuclear weapon in 2009. It is widely believed to possess a stockpile of relatively simple nuclear weapons. The IAEA has met Ri Je-son, the Director General of the General Department of Atomic Energy (GDAE) of North Korea, to discuss nuclear matters. Ri Je-son was also mentioned in this role in 2002 in a United Nations article.

On 3 September 2017, the North Korean leadership announced that it had conducted a nuclear test with what it claimed to be its first hydrogen bomb detonation. The detonation took place at an underground location at the Punggye-ri nuclear test site in North Hamgyong Province at 12:00 pm local time. South Korean officials claimed the test yielded 50 kilotons of explosive force, with many international observers claiming the test likely involved some form of a thermonuclear reaction.

- 2006 North Korean nuclear test
- 2009 North Korean nuclear test
- 2013 North Korean nuclear test
- January 2016 North Korean nuclear test
- September 2016 North Korean nuclear test
- September 2017 North Korean nuclear test

==== Other ====
- Tonghae Satellite Launching Ground
- Ryanggang explosion
- Yongbyon Nuclear Scientific Research Center
- Songun
- Asymmetric warfare
- The launching of Kwangmyŏngsŏng-3 and Kwangmyŏngsŏng-3 Unit 2 in 2012.

=== Uniforms ===
KPA officers and soldiers are most often seen wearing a mix of olive green or tan uniforms. The basic dress uniform consists of a tunic and pants (white tunics for general officers in special occasions); female soldiers wear knee length skirts but can sometimes wear pants.

Caps or peaked caps, especially for officers (and sometimes berets for women) are worn in spring and summer months and a Russian style fur hat (the Ushanka hats) in winter. Variants of the British Disruptive Pattern Material, Australian Disruptive Pattern Camouflage Uniform, United States ERDL pattern, US Woodland, and tiger stripe camouflage patterns have also been worn in a few and rare images of North Korean army officers and service personnel.

In non-dress uniforms, a steel helmet (the North Korean produced Type 40 helmet, a copy of the Soviet SSH40) seems to be the most common headgear, and is sometimes worn with a camouflage covering. During the 15 April 2012 parade, Kevlar helmets were displayed in certain KPA units and similar helmets are currently used by KPA special operations forces.

Standard military boots are worn for combat, women wear low heel shoes or heel boots for formal parades.

During the parade on 10 October 2020, a range of at least five new pixelated camouflage patterns and new soldiers' combat gear such as body armour, bulletproof helmets of all branches were shown for the first time. Even though it was difficult to tell the patterns apart from each other, two different green based designs, an arid camouflage design, blue camouflage design, and a two-colour pixelated camouflage pattern for mountain and winter warfare were all observed. Also, the use of MultiCam pattern uniforms by North Korean military personnel was first documented in 2020 during the same parade, although uniforms in this design may well have appeared in the armed forces inventory much earlier.

== See also ==
- April 25 Sports Club
- Central Military Band of the Korean People's Army
- Joson Inmingun
- Korean conflict
- Military Foundation Day
- Republic of Korea Armed Forces
- Songun
- Worker-Peasant Red Guards
