= 9th Central Committee of the Workers' Party of Korea =

Current WPK Central Committee

9th Central Committee
- Emblem of the Workers' Party of North Korea

22 February 2026 – present (229 days) Overview
- Type: Central Committee of the Workers' Party of Korea
- Election: 9th Congress

Leadership
- General Secretary: Kim Jong Un
- Presidium: 5 members
- Politburo: 19 members, 11 alternate members
- Secretariat: 12 members

Members
- Total: 139

Alternates
- Total: 111

The 9th Central Committee of the Workers' Party of Korea was elected at the party's 9th Congress on 22 February 2026, and will sit until the convocation of the next party congress. In between party congresses and specially convened conferences the Central Committee is the highest decision-making institution in the WPK and North Korea. The Central Committee is not a permanent institution and delegates day-to-day work to the Presidium, the Politburo, the Secretariat, the Central Military Commission and the Central Auditing Commission. It convenes meetings, known as "Plenary Session of the [term] Central Committee", to discuss major policies. Only full members have the right to vote, but if a full member cannot attend a plenary session, the person's spot is taken over by an alternate. Plenary session can also be attended by non-members, such meetings are known as "Enlarged Plenary Session", to participate in the committee's discussions.

== Overview ==
According to political analysts, a generational shift occurred with the so called Second Generation being phased out from the Central Committee, notably Choe Ryong-hae and O Il-jong, in favour of a younger generation.

== Plenary meetings ==
- 1st Enlarged Plenary Meeting: 23 February 2026
- 2nd Enlarged Plenary Meeting: 20–22 June 2026

== Composition ==
=== Members ===
The following were elected as members of the 9th Central Committee.

The names of members are listed according to the order of their election at the 9th Congress.

Rank	Name	Korean	8th (Note: Status in the 8th Central Committee at the end of its term.)
1	Kim Jong Un	김정은	Member
2	Pak Thae-song	박태성	Member
3	Jo Yong-won	조용원	Member
4	Ri Il-hwan	리일환	Member
5	Ri Hi-yong	리히용	Member
6	Jo Chun-ryong	조춘룡	Member
7	Kim Tok-hun	김덕훈	Member
8	Ju Chang-il	주창일	Member
9	Kim Song-nam	김성남	Member
10	Kim Jae-ryong	김재룡	Member
11	Kim Hyong-sik	김형식	Member
12	Han Kwang-sang	한광상	Member
13	Ju Chol-gyu	주철규	Member
14	Kim Pong-chol	김봉철	Member
15	Choe Chol-ung (Note: Recalled as a member.)	최철웅	Member
16	Kim Jong-sik	김정식	Member
17	Jon Hyon-chol	전현철	Member
18	Choe Jun-ho	최준호	Member
19	Yang Myong-chol	양명철	Alternate
20	Sin Yong-il	신영일	No
21	Kim Tu-il	김두일	Member
22	Pak Song-chol	박성철	Member
23	Kil Pong-chan	길봉찬	No
24	Pak Myong-son	박명선	Member
25	Kim Yo Jong	김여정	Member
26	Hyon Song-wol	현송월	Member
27	Choe Chang-hak	최창학	No
28	Pak Yong-min	박영민	Member
29	Kim Pyong-ho	김병호	Member
30	Pak Kwang-sik	박광식	Member
31	Jon Thae-su	전태수	Member
32	Jong In-chol	정인철	Member
33	Ri Song-chol	리성철	No
34	Pak Kwang-ung	박광웅	Member
35	Jon Il-ho	전일호	Member
36	Kim Song-chol	김성철	Member
37	Kim Hwa-song	김화성	Member
38	Jang Kum-chol	장금철	No
39	Kim Ryong-il	김룡일	No
40	Jo Jong-chol	조정철	No
41	Ko Kil-son	고길선	Member
42	O Tong-il	오동일	Member
43	Pak Jong-gun	박정근	Member
44	Kim Jong-gwan	김정관	Member
45	Jon Sung-guk	전승국	Member
46	Ri Chol-man	리철만	Member
47	Kim Su-gil	김수길	Member
48	Ri Kyong-chol	리경철	Member
49	Kim Chol-sam	김철삼	Member
50	Pak Chang-ho	박창호	Member
51	Pak Song-chol	박성철	Member
52	Paek Song-guk	백성국	Member
53	Ri Jong-nam	리정남	Member
54	Ri Jae-nam	리재남	Member
55	Sin Yong-chol	신영철	Member
56	Rim Yong-chol	림영철	Member
57	Sim Hong-bin	심홍빈	Member
58	Ri Yong-sik	리영식	Member
59	Kim Yong-nam	김영남	Member
60	Ko Pyong-hyon	고병현	Member
61	Jang Chang-ha	장창하	Member
62	Kim Yong-hwan	김용환	Member
63	Kim Kum-chol	김금철	Member
64	Jo Yong-dok	조용덕	Member
65	Choe Son-hui	최선희	Member
66	An Kum-chol	안금철	Member
67	Kim Son-myong	김선명	No
68	Kim Yu-il	김유일	Member
69	Ri Sang-do	리상도	Alternate
70	Wang Chang-uk	왕창욱	Member
71	Kim Kwang-il	김광일	Alternate
72	Ju Yong-il	주용일	Member
73	So Jong-jin	서종진	Member
74	Kim Chang-sok	김창석	Alternate
75	Jin Kum-song	진금송	No
76	Yun Jong-ho	윤정호	Member
77	Kim Song-bin	김성빈	Alternate
78	Kim Sung-jin	김승진	Member
79	Kim Kwang-jin	김광진	Alternate
80	Kim Sung-du	김승두	Member
81	Kim Il-guk	김일국	Member
82	Ri Chol-san	리철산	Member
83	Pak Hun	박훈	Member
84	Ri Yong-chol	리영철	Member
85	Kim Ha-gyu	김하규	No
86	Jo Jong-ryong	조정룡	No
87	Han Yong-ho	한영호	No
88	Ri Yong-chol	리영철	No
89	Ri Chang-dae	리창대	Member
90	Pang Tu-sop	방두섭	Member
91	Kim Chol-won	김철원	Member
92	Choe Kun-yong	최근영	Member
93	Jon Ryong-nam	전룡남	Alternate
94	Pae Song-chol	배성철	No
95	Kang Myong-chol	강명철	Member
96	No Kwang-chol	노광철	Member
97	Jong Kyong-thaek	정경택	Member
98	Ri Yong-gil	리영길	Member
99	Pak Hui-chol (Note: Pak Hui-chol was placed under investigation on 20 June 2026, for allegations of corruption.)	박희철	Member
100	Kim Song-gi	김성기	Member
101	Kang Sun-nam	강순남	Member
102	Kim Yong-bok	김영복	Alternate
103	Jong Myong-do	정명도	Member
104	Ri Chang-ho	리창호	Member
105	Kwon Thae-yong	권태영	Member
106	Pak Yong-il	박영일	Member
107	Yu Kwang-u	유광우	No
108	Pak Kwang-sop	박광섭	No
109	Kim Kwang-hyok	김광혁	Member
110	Choe Tu-yong	최두용	Alternate
111	Choe Chun-gil	최춘길	Alternate
112	So Hong-chan	서홍찬	Member
113	Kim Ki-ryong	김기룡	Member
114	Ryu Sang-hun	류상훈	Member
115	Kang Kyong-ho	강경호	Member
116	Song Ki-chol	송기철	Member
117	Jong Yong-nam	정용남	Member
118	Ri Ho-rim	리호림	Member
119	Choe Hui-thae	최희태	Member
120	So Chang-ryol	서창렬	No
121	Pak Jin-myong	박진명	No
122	Yun Jae-hyok	윤재혁	Member
123	Kang Yong-ho	강영호	No
124	Ri Chang-gil	리창길	Member
125	Ho Chol-ho	허철호	Alternate
126	Ho Chol-yong	허철용	Member
127	Yu Jin	유진	Member
128	Ok Chang-guk	옥창국	Alternate
129	Ri Yong-hon	리용헌	Member
130	Ri Kyong-il	리경일	Alternate
131	Kim Kwang-nam	김광남	Member
132	Kim Son-guk	김선국	Alternate
133	Kim Son-uk	김선욱	Member
134	Mun Pong-hyok	문봉혁	No
135	Han Yong-il	한영일	Member
136	O Kum-chol	오금철	Member
137	Ri Yong-sik	리영식	Member
138	Kim Sung-chan	김승찬	Member
139	Pak Ji-min	박지민	Member
—	Han Sang-man (Note: By-elected as members on 20 June 2026, from alternate members.)	한상만	No
—	Kwon Song-hwan	권성환	Alternate
—	Kim Yong-ul (Note: Directly elected as a member on 20 June 2026.)	김영을	No
—	Pak Jong-chon (Note: Directly by-elected on 29 August 2026.)	박정천	Member
—	Om Ju-ho	엄주호	No

=== Alternate members ===
The following were elected as alternate members of the 9th Central Committee.

The names of alternate members are listed according to the order of their election at the 9th Congress.

Rank	Name	Korean	8th
1	Han Sang-man	한상만	No
2	Kim Yong-sik	김영식	Alternate
3	Choe Kwon-sik	최권식	No
4	Yang Yong-jin	양영진	No
5	Choe Song-nam	최성남	Alternate
6	Ri Won-jong	리원종	No
7	Hyon Un-chol	현은철	No
8	Kwon Song-hwan	권성환	Alternate
9	Yang Ki-song	양기성	No
10	Ri Myong-guk	리명국	Alternate
11	Kim Yong-sik	김영식	Alternate
12	Paek Min-gwang	백민광	Alternate
13	Mun Chol	문철	Alternate
14	Han Jong-hyok	한종혁	Alternate
15	Jon Hyang-sun	전향순	Alternate
16	Jo Sok-ho	조석호	Alternate
17	Jang Chang-min	장창민	Alternate
18	Hwang Yong-gil	황영길	Alternate
19	Kwak Yong-ho	곽영호	Alternate
20	Kim Chol-jin	김철진	No
21	Ri Song-chol	리성철	No
22	Pak Yong-jin	박영진	No
23	Hong Pyong-chol	홍병철	Alternate
24	Ri Ryong-nam	리룡남	Alternate
25	Sin Hong-chol	신홍철	Alternate
26	Kim Son-il	김선일	No
27	Kim Won-myong	김원명	No
28	Kang Yong-jun	강영준	No
29	Kang Myong-chol	강명철	Member
30	Choe Ryong-gil	최룡길	Alternate
31	Kim Yong-jin	김영진	No
32	Yun Song-chol	윤성철	No
33	So Kwang-ung	서광웅	No
34	Ji Hyong-rok	지형록	No
35	Jon Thae-sik	전태식	No
36	Ri Song-bom	리성범	No
37	Kim Chol-bom	김철범	No
38	Sin Chang-gil	신창길	Alternate
39	Ju Mun-jin	주문진	No
40	Pak Hyon-chol	박현철	No
41	Pak Myong-ho	박명호	Alternate
42	Kim Chol-nam	김철남	Alternate
43	Song Sung-chol	송승철	Alternate
44	Sin Chang-il	신창일	Alternate
45	Choe Kyong-nam	최경남	Alternate
46	Kim Kwang-un	김광운	Alternate
47	Won Kyong-mo	원경모	Alternate
48	Pak Myong-son	박명선	Alternate
49	Kim Kang-il	김강일	No
50	Jong Myong-nam	정명남	No
51	Ri Jong-guk	리정국	No
52	An Yong-hwan	안영환	Alternate
53	Ri Kyong-chol	리경철	Alternate
54	Kim Hak-chol	김학철	Alternate
55	Ju Song-nam	주성남	No
56	Ko Myong-su	고명수	Alternate
57	Ri Pong-chun	리봉춘	Alternate
58	Ko In-chol	고인철	Alternate
59	Choe Kwang-il	최광일	Alternate
60	Kim Pong-chol	김봉철	Alternate
61	Kim Chun-gyo	김춘교	Alternate
62	Hong Chol-ung	홍철웅	Alternate
63	Jong Yong-su	정영수	No
64	Ji Yong-bok	지영복	No
65	Ri Chol-nam	리철남	No
66	Kim Pok-nam	김복남	Member
67	Sin Song-guk	신성국	Alternate
68	Sin Myong-son	신명선	Alternate
69	Kim Jin-yong	김진용	Alternate
70	O Myong-chol	오명철	Alternate
71	Han Man-hung	한만흥	Alternate
72	An Sung-hak	안승학	Alternate
73	Ryong Kun-chol	룡군철	Alternate
74	Pak Mun-ho	박문호	Member
75	Ri Yong-gun	리용근	No
76	O Chun-yong	오춘영	Alternate
77	Choe Song-nam	최성남	Alternate
78	Pae Song-guk	배성국	Alternate
79	Kim Kum-chol	김금철	Alternate
80	Pak Hyon-u	박현우	No
81	Pak Hyon-il	박현일	No
82	Kim Song-chol	김성철	Alternate
83	Kim Song-chol	김성철	Alternate
84	Kim Jong-chol	김정철	Alternate
85	Jong Yon-hak	정연학	Alternate
86	Ju Hyon-ung	주현웅	Alternate
87	Choe Kyong-chol	최경철	Alternate
88	Ri Song-bong	리성봉	Alternate
89	Kim Chol	김철	Alternate
90	Ri Kyong-jin	리경진	No
91	Kim Tae-gwang	김대광	No
92	Kim Tu-hong	김두홍	Alternate
93	Jon Pyong-ryol	전병렬	No
94	Kim Hyong-bom	김형범	Alternate
95	Choe Myong-chol	최명철	No
96	Jang Yong-chol	장영철	Alternate
97	Ri Hyong-son	리형선	No
98	Pak In-gi	박인기	Alternate
99	Ri Kwang-nam	리광남	No
100	Ma Hyok-chol	마혁철	Alternate
101	Ri Kye-bong	리계봉	Alternate
102	Ro Ik	로익	Alternate
103	Yun Chi-gol	윤치걸	Alternate
104	O Yong-jae	오영재	Alternate
105	Choe Yong-gil	최영길	No
106	Yu Chol-u	유철우	Alternate
107	Ri Yong-hyop	리용협	No
108	Kim Kwang-uk	김광욱	Alternate
109	Kim Jong-su	김정수	Alternate
110	Sonu Yong-hyok	선우영혁	Alternate
111	Kim Tu-won	김두원	No
—	Paek Un-chol (Note: By-elected as alternate members on 20 June 2026.)	백은철	No
—	Ri Yun-su	리윤수	No
—	Choe Chol-ung	최철웅	Member
—	Ko Han-sop	고한섭	No
—	Jong Kyong-nam	장경남	No

== Department directors ==
The following were appointed as directors of the departments of the 9th Central Committee.

The names of department directors are listed according to the order of their appointment at the 1st plenary meeting of the 9th Central Committee.

Rank	Name	Korean	8th (Note: Status as department director at the end of the 8th Central Committee's term.)
1	Kim Jae-ryong (Note: Dismissed on 20 June 2026.)	김재룡	Yes
2	Ri Il-hwan	리일환	No
3	Jong Kyong-thaek	정경택	No
4	Kim Song-nam	김성남	Yes
5	Sin Yong-il	신영일	No
6	Ri Hi-yong	리히용	Yes
7	Ju Chang-il	주창일	Yes
8	Jo Chun-ryong	조춘룡	Yes
9	An Kum-chol	안금철	No
10	Kim Jong-gwan	김정관	No
11	Kim Sung-du	김승두	No
12	Kim Yo Jong	김여정	No
13	Pak Kwang-ung	박광웅	No
14	Han Kwang-sang	한광상	Yes
15	Ju Chol-gyu	주철규	Yes
16	Choe Chun-gil	최춘길	No
17	Kim Song-chol	김성철	No
—	Jo Yong-won (Note: Jo Yong-won was appointed as director of the Organizational Leadership Department on 20 June 2026.)	조용원	Yes
—	Ri Ho-rim (Note: Ri Ho-rim was appointed as director of the Light Industry Department on 20 June 2026.)	리호림	No
