= 9th Politburo of the Workers' Party of Korea =

The 9th Politburo of the Workers' Party of Korea, officially the Political Bureau of the 9th Central Committee of the Workers' Party of Korea (Korean: 제9기 조선로동당 중앙위원회 정치국), was elected on 23 February 2026 by the 1st Plenary Session of the 9th Central Committee.

== Meetings ==
- 1st Meeting: 25 February 2026
- 3rd Meeting: 22 June 2026
- 4th Enlarged Meeting: 26 August 2026

== Composition ==
=== Members ===
The following were elected as members of the 9th Politburo.

The names of members are listed according to the order of their election at the 1st plenary meeting of the 9th Central Committee.

Rank	Name	Korean	8th (Note: Status in the Politburo at the end of the 8th Central Committee's term.)
1	Kim Jong Un	김정은	Member
2	Pak Thae-song	박태성	Member
3	Jo Yong-won	조용원	Member
4	Kim Jae-ryong	김재룡	Member
5	Ri Il-hwan	리일환	Member
6	Jong Kyong-thaek	정경택	Member
7	Kim Song-nam	김성남	Alternate
8	Sin Yong-il	신영일	No
9	Ri Hi-yong	리히용	Member
10	Ju Chang-il	주창일	Alternate
11	Jo Chun-ryong	조춘룡	Member
12	An Kum-chol	안금철	No
13	Kim Jong-gwan	김정관	Member
14	Kim Sung-du	김승두	No
15	Choe Son-hui	최선희	Member
16	No Kwang-chol	노광철	Member
17	Kim Song-gi	김성기	No
18	Kim Tok-hun	김덕훈	Member
19	Pak Jong-gun	박정근	Member
—	Pak Jong-chon (Note: Pak Jong-chon was by-elected as a member on 29 August 2026.)	박정천	Member
—	Yu Kwang-u (Note: Yu Kwang-u was by-elected as a member on 29 August 2026.)	유광우	No

=== Alternate members ===
The following were elected as alternate members of the 9th Politburo.

The names of alternate members are listed according to the order of their election at the 1st plenary meeting of the 9th Central Committee.

Rank	Name	Korean	8th
1	Kim Yo Jong	김여정	No
2	Pak Kwang-ung	박광웅	No
3	Han Kwang-sang	한광상	Alternate
4	Ju Chol-gyu	주철규	Alternate
5	Jon Hyon-chol	전현철	No
6	Pak Hun	박훈	No
7	Ri Chol-man	리철만	Alternate
8	Ri Yong-gil	리영길	Member
9	Ri Chang-dae	리창대	Alternate
10	Pang Tu-sop	방두섭	Alternate
11	Kim Chol-won	김철원	Alternate
—	Ri Ho-rim (Note: Ri Ho-rim was by-elected as an alternate member on 22 June 2026.)	리호림	No
