= 2026 North Korean parliamentary election =

- 15 March 2026

All 687 seats in the Supreme People's Assembly 344 seats needed for a majority
- Turnout: 99.99% ( 0.00 pp)
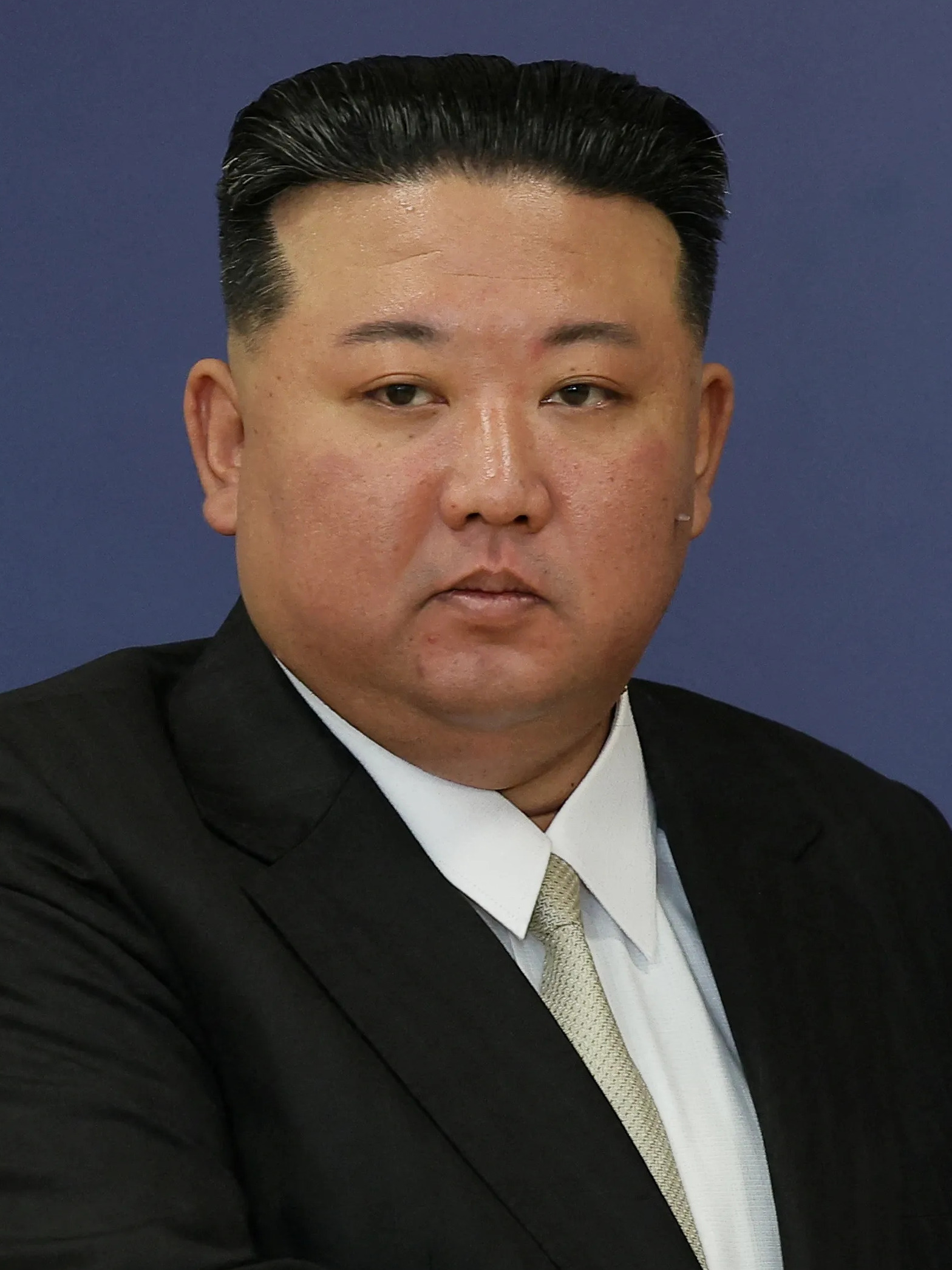
	First party
Leader	Kim Jong Un
Party	WPK
Leader since	11 April 2012
Leader's seat	Did not stand (Note: The President of the State Affairs Commission is ineligible to also serve as a member of the Supreme People's Assembly according to Article 87 of the Constitution.)
Last election	687
Seats won	671
Seat change	Steady
Percentage	99.93%
SAC President before election
Kim Jong Un
Workers' Party
Elected SAC President
Kim Jong Un
Workers' Party

Parliamentary elections were held in North Korea on 15 March 2026 to elect the members of the 15th Supreme People's Assembly. Originally expected to be held in 2024, the elections were announced on 4 March 2026, shortly following the conclusion of the 9th Congress of the Workers' Party of Korea and Kim Jong Un's re-election as the General Secretary. With only one candidate on the ballot in each constituency, outside observers described it as a show election. 687 candidates for the DPRK deputies to the SPA were elected. North Korea's state media reported opposing votes, the first in an SPA election since 1957.

== Background ==
Parliamentary elections were originally expected to be held in March or April 2024, as the five-year term of the 14th Supreme People's Assembly would end around that time. However, there came no indications for an election as the time approached, sparking speculation that the election was delayed. In February 2026 the 9th Congress of the Workers' Party of Korea was held, where Kim Jong Un was re-elected as general secretary.

On 4 March 2026, the Standing Committee of the Supreme People's Assembly issued Decision No. 360, which announced the election of deputies to the 15th Supreme People's Assembly on 15 March 2026. It also issued the Decision No. 361, which organized a Central Election Committee for the election of the 15th Supreme People's Assembly that consists of Kim Hyong-sik as chairman, Kyung Kyong-chol as vice chairman, Ko Gil-seon as secretary general, as well as, Jang Chang-hyeok, Han Yeong-guk, Bang Du-seop, Kim Geum-chol, Ri Myong-guk, Moon Chol, Han Jong-hyeok, Jeon Hyang-soon, Pak Hee-chol and Jeon Seong-min as members. The election date followed the 9th Party Congress, marking the synchronization between the two events.

== Conduct ==
North Korean leader Kim Jong Un went to Sub-constituency No. 48 of Constituency No. 150 Chonsong located at the Chonsong Youth Coal Mine at the Sunchon Area Youth Coal-mining Complex in South Pyongan Province, and voted for the mine's manager Jo Chol-ho as deputy to the Supreme People's Assembly.

At 18:00, the Central Election Committee reported that voting was ended at all constituencies and 99.99% of registered voters attended, including North Korean citizens staying in foreign countries who wished to vote. It was announced that 0.0037% were unable to vote because they were in other countries or out at sea, and 0.00003% abstained.

== Results ==
The Central Election Committee reported on 17 March 2026 that the voter turnout for the election was at 99.99%, and that 99.93% of the voters cast their ballots in favor of the registered candidates, while 0.07% voted to reject. The report also included the names of the 687 elected deputies to the 15th Supreme People's Assembly.

Party	Votes	%	Seats
Workers' Party of Korea		99.93	671
Social organizations		99.93	10
Friendly parties and religious organizations (Note: Friendly parties of the WPK are the Korean Social Democratic Party and the Chondoist Chongu Party)		99.93	6
Against		0.07	–
Total			687
Registered voters/turnout		99.99	
Source: Korean Central News Agency

=== Elected members ===
The following individuals were elected as members of parliament:

No.	Constituency	Elected deputy
1	Mangyongdae	Jo Myong-chol
2	Kwangbok	Jo Kum-ju
3	Phalgol	Kim Yun-sil
4	Janghun	Kim Tu-won
5	Kallimgil	Kim Yo Jong
6	Chukjon	Kim Chun-hui
7	Taephyong	Pyon Sun-chol
8	Wollo	Ri Il-bae
9	Kyongsang	Choe Chol-jung
10	Kyogu	Pak Ji-min
11	Ryonhwa	Hong Se-chol
12	Sochang	Kim Un-chol
13	Phyongchon	Ok Yong-su
14	Ansan	Kim Chun-chol
15	Pongji	Song Kye-chol
16	Ryukgyo	Phyo Hyok-san
17	Saemaul	Kim Kwang-man
18	Mirae	Ri Yong-nam
19	Pothonggang	Ryang Sung-jin
20	Ryugyong	Jon Jong-ho
21	Pulgungori	Kim Su-gil
22	Kaeson	Rim Kyong-ae
23	Pipha	Mun Chol
24	Jonsung	Kim Jae-ryong
25	Kinmaul	Kim Hye-ok
26	Sosong	Kim Kum-son
27	Janggyong	Ri Song-jun
28	Kinjae	Ha Jong-bok
29	Hasin	Jang Myong-chol
30	Jungsin	Kim Jong-hyok
31	Songyo	Ri Yong-suk
32	Tungme	Kim Jong-gwan
33	Yongje	Won Il
34	Ryulgok	Ri Kum-byol
35	Tongdaewon	Ri Man-song
36	Samma	Kim Jong-chol
37	Saesallim	Ri Kwang-chon
38	Tongmun	Jong Kum-chol
39	Chongryu	Kye Chun-yong
40	Munsu	Ko Kyong-il
41	Tapje	Choe Jong-sil
42	Sagok	Kim Jong-chol
43	Ryonghung	Jo Song-chol
44	Taesong	Kim Sung-chan
45	Anhak	Ri Yong-sik
46	Rangnang	Han Jong-hyok
47	Jongo	Pak Kwang-chun
48	Jongbaek	Yu Yong-ryong
49	Chungsong	Jo Yong-won
50	Kwanmun	Pak Kyong-jin
51	Sungri	Ko Song-dok
52	Wonam	Mun Kyong-ho
53	Thosong	Pak Song-ryong
54	Ulmil	Kim Sung-jin
55	Kwahak	Kim Hyok-chon
56	Jonwi	Kim Song-hui
57	Hadang	Yun Kwang-yong
58	Soryong	Pak Song-min
59	Singan	Kim Ryong-song
60	Ryokpho	Ri Un-ju
61	Nunggum	Choe Son-hui
62	Sadong	Kim Ki-ok
63	Turu	Choe Hui-thae
64	Hyuam	Jo Sok-ho
65	Rihyon	Yang Hak-myong
66	Ryongsong	Nam Pok-son
67	Rimwon	Ham Chol-nam
68	Unha	Kim Yong-hwan
69	Oun	Pak Chun-gyu
70	Sunan	Jon In-suk
71	Sokbak	Pak Kum-hui
72	Samsok	Pak Song-sim
73	Todok	Pak Hun
74	Kangnam	Choe Ju-hyok
75	Yongjin	Ri Won-ok
76	Kangdong	Yang Yong-jin
77	Ponghwa	Hong Song-ho
78	Samdung	Jong Kum-chol
79	Sangri	Kim Won-chol
80	Hukryong	Cha Tong-gyun
81	Pongmun	Kim Ok-chol
82	Hwasong	Jon Il-ho
83	Hwawon	Pak Kyong-su
84	Chonggye	Rim Tong-hun
85	Phyongsong	Ryu Yong-ok
86	Sinbae	Song Yon-hui
87	Yokap	Kim Hwa-song
88	Samhwa	An Tok-won
89	Jurye	Kim Myong-jin
90	Okjon	Sin Kyong-ho
91	Kuwol	Kim Sung-du
92	Ponghak	Kim Yong-jin
93	Anju	Hwang Yong-jin
94	Sinanju	An Jong-hak
95	Misang	Kim Myong-nam
96	Tungbangsan	Kim Son-myong
97	Nampyong	Ri Kum-chol
98	Wonphung	Ri Kun-ho
99	Kaechon	Kim Chang-gon
100	Kunu	Kim Mi-yong
101	Konji	Kil Myong-jin
102	Ramjon	Kim Song-chan
103	Sambong	Kim Se-sik
104	Alil	An Kum-chol
105	Ryongun	Mun Yong-chol
106	Kakam	Yu Thae-song
107	Sunchon	Ri Kyong-ho
108	Saedok	Ri Kyong-chol
109	Soksu	Kang Ji-yong
110	Ryonpho	Pak Myong-gil
111	Pongu	Kim Kum-se
112	Subok	Jang Yong-bok
113	Jikdong	Choe Song-gun
114	Ryongak	Kim Song-rim
115	Tokchon	Choe Jang-il
116	Kongwon	Kim Song-ho
117	Jenam	Jong Chang-ho
118	Chongsong	So Kwang-ung
119	Sangdok	Kang Un-chol
120	Muan	Pak Thae-song
121	Taedong	Ri Song-bom
122	Sijong	Pak Yong-min
123	Yongok	Ri Kwang-mi
124	Jungsan	Choe Chol-u
125	Sokda	Kim Jae-hyok
126	Phungjong	Jong Yong-sik
127	Phyongwon	Pak Yong-ae
128	Wonhwa	Son Kum-suk
129	Opha	Kim Pyong-ho
130	Unbong	Ko Kil-son
131	Hanchon	Ro Kwang-nam
132	Sukchon	Ho Yun
133	Ryongdok	Kang Kyong-ho
134	Komsan	Kim Song-hui
135	Chaeryong	Yang Jong-nam
136	Namyang	Kim Jae-song
137	Mundok	O In-gwon
138	Ripsok	Choe Chun-sil
139	Ryongo	Ri Ik
140	Sangbong	Hwang Tok-jo
141	Hungan	Ko Chol-man
142	Songchon	Won Ok-suk
143	Kunja	Ri Kyong-hun
144	Sinsongchon	Han Tong-song
145	Jangrim	Kim Ki-gun
146	Sinyang	Kim Song-chol
147	Yangdok	Son Chol
148	Tongyang	Kim Song
149	Unsan	Ri Sun-chol
150	Chonsong	Jo Chol-ho
151	Ryongdae	Ri Yun-ho
152	Jaedong	O Yong-chol
153	Haksan	Ri Jong-chol
154	Taeil	Kim Kwang-ul
155	Pukchang	Kim Yong-chol
156	Songnam	Ri Yong-chol
157	Okchon	Kim Kwang-su
158	Inpho	Kim Tong-hyok
159	Tukjang	Ri Yong
160	Maengsan	Ri Yong-nam
161	Nyongwon	Hong Myong-il
162	Taehung	Pak Jae-won
163	Hoechang	Ri Chol-san
164	Sinjak	Kim Jun-hyok
165	Sokhang	Jang Se-hyon
166	Ungok	Kim Yong-sik
167	Sinuiju	Kim Song-ok
168	Paeksa	Kim Mi-hwa
169	Namjung	Kim Song-nam
170	Minpho	O Yong-chol
171	Sumun	Jo Son-su
172	Chinson	Kim Il-hyok
173	Ryusang	Kang Ryong-mo
174	Wai	Kim Chun-sil
175	Sokha	Kim Hye-yong
176	Rakchong	Jon Myong-il
177	Yonha	Kim Yong-jin
178	Jongju	Hyon Yong-sun
179	Taesong	Ri Yong-jun
180	Koan	Jon Hyon-chol
181	Namho	Pak Tae-song
182	Osan	Pak Jin-myong
183	Kusong	Kim Jong-chol
184	Paeksok	So Ju-yong
185	Panghyon	Hong Pyong-chol
186	Chahung	Yang Myong-chol
187	Phihyon	Kang Chang-chol
188	Ryangchaek	Jong Un-nam
189	Paekma	Choe Jong-chol
190	Ryongchon	Pak Kwang-ung
191	Pukjung	Kim Jong-chol
192	Ryongampho	Han Kwan-il
193	Sinam	Kim Kwang-un
194	Yomju	Ri Myong-gil
195	Tasa	So Won-gil
196	Woeha	Choe Yong-jin
197	Subu	Jang Chang-ha
198	Cholsan	Kim Yong-nam
199	Tongrim	Kim Myong-gun
200	Chonggang	Kim Sang-il
201	Singok	Ri Yong-ok
202	Sonchon	Choe Sung-chol
203	Wolgang	Hwang Yong-gil
204	Samyang	Kim Tuk-song
205	Inam	So Jong-jin
206	Kwaksan	Choe Hye-ran
207	Wonha	Kim Chol-nam
208	Kwansang	Hwang Jun-thaek
209	Unjon	Hwang Kyong-hun
210	Taeo	Mun Pong-ran
211	Pakchon	Kim Chang-ryong
212	Toksam	Han Sang-man
213	Maengjung	Jang Yong-ae
214	Nyongbyon	Jang Kum-suk
215	Phalwon	Kim Chol-won
216	Kujang	Choe Yong-man
217	Ryongdung	Kim Song-guk
218	Ryongmun	Kim Yong-song
219	Sugu	Choe Sun-chol
220	Unsan	Ryu Man-hyong
221	Phungyang	Ri Ryong-nam
222	Myongjo	Jo Sok-chol
223	Thaechon	Kim Myong-ho
224	Unhung	Paek Un-hwa
225	Hakson	Kim Song-il
226	Chonma	Tang Yong-il
227	Joak	Kim Kun-chol
228	Uiju	Kim In-ho
229	Unchon	Kim Son-gyong
230	Tokryong	Choe Yong-dok
231	Sakju	Kim Yu-il
232	Kumbu	Kim Myong-sik
233	Suphung	Ri Kwang-nam
234	Chongsong	Pak Chung-u
235	Taegwan	Ok Kum-sun
236	Taeryonggang	Kim Jong-sik
237	Changsong	Choe Yang-hyok
238	Tongchang	Kang Yong-ok
239	Pyokdong	Kim Song-il
240	Sindo	Kim Thae-song
241	Pungang	Wang Chang-uk
242	Maeya	Choe Song-il
243	Haechong	Pak Won-ok
244	Uppha	Ri Yong-il
245	Okgye	Kim Yong-hui
246	Soae	Jang Yong-rok
247	Sokchon	Ri Sun-hui
248	Hakhyon	Ri Kwang-ho
249	Yangsa	Ri Hi-yong
250	Pyoksong	Ri Jae-ok
251	Jukchon	An Myong-jun
252	Kangryong	Jo Hye-suk
253	Pupho	O Jae-hwan
254	Kumdong	Hyon Un-chol
255	Ongjin	O Se-chol
256	Sudae	Ri Hae-im
257	Sagot	Jon Ryong-nam
258	Kingogae	Kim Kwang-won
259	Jonsan	Kang No-ul
260	Thaetan	Choe Ok-song
261	Ryujong	Kim Kwang-jin
262	Jangyon	Kim Myong-gil
263	Rakyon	Hwang Myong-jin
264	Samchon	Om Pong-sik
265	Talchon	Kwon Myong-guk
266	Songhwa	Jong Pong-chol
267	Unryul	Kim Kum-chol
268	Kumsanpho	Ryu Kwang
269	Jangryon	Jong Yong-hwa
270	Unchon	Kang Man-sop
271	Ryangdam	Ho Jong-man
272	Anak	Ro Myong-il
273	Wolji	Kim Ki-ryong
274	Taechu	Ri Chol-ryong
275	Sinchon	Jo Hyon-sok
276	Saenal	Wang Myong-phil
277	Saegil	Kwak Yong-ho
278	Panjong	Kim Pong-do
279	Jaeryong	Han Jong-hyok
280	Samjigang	Ri Hye-suk
281	Jangguk	Ri Sang-do
282	Pukji	Kim Tae-song
283	Sinwon	So Pyong-hwan
284	Muhak	Kim Thae-myong
285	Hanchon	Kang Jong-hui
286	Ponggwan	Kim Kwang-uk
287	Paechon	Won Kyong-mo
288	Kumsong	Ri Hyang-ok
289	Jonggok	U Jong-sol
290	Pongryang	Ri Chol-man
291	Kumgok	An Song-chol
292	Yonan	Ju Chol-gyu
293	Ohyon	Kim Jong-ok
294	Songya	Kim Thae-sik
295	Chonthae	Pak Sun-ran
296	Haewol	Kil Pong-chan
297	Chongdan	O Hye-son
298	Namchon	Kang Myong-chol
299	Tokdal	Kim Jong-su
300	Chongjong	Jo Kuk-hwa
301	Kwail	Kim Chun-nam
302	Phogu	Yo Chon-su
303	Ryongyon	Pyon Jong-chun
304	Kumi	Jong Pong-sik
305	Sariwon	O Myong-chun
306	Wonju	Kim Pong-nam
307	Migok	Kim Il-guk
308	Songyong	Ryang Un-chol
309	Kwangsong	Ko Song-sim
310	Jongbang	Yun Thae-sil
311	Unha	Pak Chang-ho
312	Kuchon	Kim Myong-sim
313	Sokthap	Choe Ju-chol
314	Songrim	Kim Chol-su
315	Tangsan	Pak Jong-gun
316	Hwangju	Ra Ok-hui
317	Chongryong	Pak Myong-son
318	Samjong	Hong Myong-chol
319	Hukgyo	Pak Tong-sok
320	Yonthan	Kim Hyong-sik
321	Subong	Paek Myong-gwan
322	Pongsan	Yun Chol-su
323	Machon	Chu Song-bok
324	Songjong	Paek Min-gwang
325	Kuyon	Kim Song-il
326	Unpha	Ri Hyok-chol
327	Kangan	Ju Tong-chol
328	Kwangmyong	Ri Chol-ung
329	Rinsan	Ri Jong-hui
330	Taechon	Song Nam-su
331	Sohung	Sok Myong-hwa
332	Poman	Ju Yong-il
333	Suan	Kim Jong-sik
334	Namjong	Pak Kum-song
335	Yonsan	Ri Myong-chol
336	Holdong	Ri Hyok-chol
337	Sinphyong	Kim Tong-chil
338	Mannyon	Choe Kwang-su
339	Koro	Yun Yong-il
340	Koksan	Pak Chung-song
341	Singye	Choe Kun-yong
342	Jongbong	Jo Chang-sop
343	Chuchon	Kwon Chol-nam
344	Phyongsan	Choe Tu-yong
345	Chongsu	Song Sun-hui
346	Namchon	Ri Ung-gil
347	Kumchon	Ryang Il
348	Kwangbuk	Jong Chan-gwang
349	Thosan	An Yong-sil
350	Samsongdae	Choe Kwon
351	Sungho	Ri Chol-ryong
352	Mandal	Kim Chol-ryong
353	Sangwon	Sin Yong-il
354	Myongdang	Yun Jae-hyok
355	Junghwa	Jon Hyang-sun
356	Myongwol	Han Kil-su
357	Kanggye	Kang Un-gyong
358	Yonju	Ri Yong-hak
359	Puchang	Ryu Chol-min
360	Yahak	Ri Su-ryon
361	Sokhyon	Pak Mun-chol
362	Woeryong	Ri Yong-jae
363	Uijong	Kim Ha-gyu
364	Hungju	Ho Kyong-sim
365	Yokphyong	Pak Chol-hun
366	Solmoru	Ri Pyong-guk
367	Chuphyong	Kim Chol-jin
368	Huichon	Jo Chun-ryong
369	Jonphyong	Jo Myong-chol
370	Manpho	Pak Song-chol
371	Kuo	Ko Pyong-hyon
372	Munak	Yun Chun-song
373	Jonchon	Ri Yong-chol
374	Hakmu	Jo Ju-chol
375	Unsong	Sin Chang-gil
376	Songgan	Tong Kum-ok
377	Songryong	Jon Su-son
378	Janggang	Ri Song-sik
379	Hwaphyong	Kim Chang-nam
380	Junggang	An Sun-chol
381	Jasong	Jon Myong-ok
382	Sijung	Kong Song-ok
383	Wiwon	Kim Chang-gol
384	Ryanggang	Pak Yong-nam
385	Chosan	Jo Kuk-chol
386	Usi	Kim Pong-sun
387	Kophung	Ri Chol-ho
388	Songwon	Choe Chol-min
389	Tongsin	Kim Kyong-chol
390	Ryongrim	Kang Jong-sim
391	Rangrim	Jo Yong-ho
392	Hyangsan	Kim Nam-hyok
393	Thaephyong	Ri Myong-guk
394	Segil	Rim Sun-hui
395	Kwanyong	Chu Myong-gil
396	Jangdok	Pak Hyang-mi
397	Tokgol	Kim Chang-sok
398	Wonsan	Kim Myong-il
399	Myongsok	Nam Myong-ho
400	Wonnam	Pak Son-yong
401	Phoha	Kim Chang-ho
402	Pokmak	Ri Yun-su
403	Sinsong	Ri Song-chol
404	Munchon	Jang Yong-nam
405	Munphyong	Kwon Yong-nam
406	Okphyong	Pae Ryu-phil
407	Chonnae	Kim Jong-bom
408	Hwara	Ri Song-won
409	Anbyon	Paek Song-guk
410	Paehwa	Mun Yun-sik
411	Kosan	Choe Yong-sung
412	Puryong	Ri Son-gwon
413	Solbong	Ju Mun-jin
414	Thongchon	Ri Kwang-hyok
415	Songjon	Ri Ki-chun
416	Kosong	Kim Chun-myong
417	Onjong	Choe Chun-gil
418	Kumgang	Hwang Ryong-il
419	Soksa	Jang Kum-chol
420	Changdo	Ri Hye-gyong
421	Kimhwa	Ro Sung-hyok
422	Hoeyang	Choe Sung-thaek
423	Sepho	Ri Song-il
424	Huphyong	Mun Chol
425	Phyonggang	Hong Chang-ok
426	Pokgye	Kim Chol-bom
427	Cholwon	Sin Chol-hui
428	Naemun	Pak Jong-ho
429	Ichon	Kim Chon-man
430	Phangyo	Paek Jong-sun
431	Popdong	Jo Kuk-chol
432	Tongun	Yu Kyong-hak
433	Samil	Kim Tok-hun
434	Sangsinhung	Jo Yong-su
435	Soun	Mun Yong-son
436	Sosang	Kim Song-ho
437	Phungho	Maeng Kwi-nyo
438	Hoesang	Kwon In-suk
439	Segori	Ho Song-chol
440	Rihwa	Kim Mi-ran
441	Toksan	Kang Hyon-su
442	Sapho	Ju Chang-il
443	Saegori	Ri Chung-song
444	Choun	Jong Hong-su
445	Hungdok	Han Song-ok
446	Hungso	To Song-gwang
447	Haean	Ri Chol-hak
448	Unjung	Ha Myong-chol
449	Chongi	Ri Hyok-chol
450	Soho	Pak Ryong-sik
451	Phungo	Yun Song-chol
452	Sinpho	Ri Jong-nam
453	Okgum	Ri Hak-mun
454	Yanghwa	Han Kil-hun
455	Tanchon	Choe Jong-suk
456	Ssangsan	Mun Sang-gwon
457	Sindanchon	Ho Thae-chol
458	Tokhung	Kim Jae-won
459	Pokchon	Jo Song-chol
460	Kwangchon	Choe Hung
461	Paekgumsan	Han Kwang-sang
462	Kumgol	Ryu Kwang-myong
463	Puktu	Hwang Yong-sam
464	Hamju	Ri Kyong-il
465	Kusang	Jo Hyon-chol
466	Tongbong	Ju Chang-sok
467	Sangjung	Jon Song-min
468	Jongpyong	Han Yong-ok
469	Sondok	Pak Tong-chol
470	Sinsang	Pak Yong-jin
471	Chowon	Pak Kuk-bom
472	Toksan	Ri Myong-chol
473	Kumya	Pak Hyon-chol
474	Inhung	Choe Yong-son
475	Kajin	Kim Chol-sam
476	Kwangmyongsong	Pak Chol-su
477	Jungnam	Kim Chang-gil
478	Kowon	Kim Kwang-sok
479	Puraesan	Pak Kun-il
480	Sudong	Kim Chol-yong
481	Iryong	Kwon Song-hwan
482	Jangdong	Ri Song-won
483	Yodok	Jo Song-nam
484	Yonggwang	Ri Man-bok
485	Sujon	Kim Hyok
486	Kisang	Kim Yong-sik
487	Sinhung	Kim Yong-hak
488	Sangwonchon	On Song-sik
489	Puhung	Ri Myong-sok
490	Jangjin	Ri Ryong
491	Yangji	Jong Sang-chol
492	Pujon	Kim Chang-il
493	Rakwon	Kim Tong-chun
494	Hongwon	Jon Kyong-hui
495	Sanyang	Kang Sang-chol
496	Unpho	Jong Kil-hun
497	Toksong	Jo Son-hwa
498	Sagwa	Kim In-bom
499	Pukchong	Ri Won-jong
500	Sinchang	Pak Ku-ho
501	Sinbukchong	Jong Yong-hyok
502	Chonghung	Han Myong-hui
503	Riwon	Kim Song-bin
504	Kuup	Hwang Chang-suk
505	Rahung	Kim Yong-nam
506	Hochon	Ryu Sang-hun
507	Sinhong	Sin Hong-chol
508	Sangnong	Pak Su-bom
509	Kumho	Jang Chang-min
510	Songam	Jon Chol-hyok
511	Chonghak	Jon Sung-guk
512	Jegang	Choe Sung-ju
513	Jangpyong	Choe Kwang-hyok
514	Haksong	Ri Kwang-nam
515	Kilju	Kim Jang-ung
516	Ilsin	Cha Tong-su
517	Junam	Pak Myong-ho
518	Yongbuk	Ri Kyong-il
519	Hwadae	Jo Kum-hui
520	Ryongmi	Ri Yong-son
521	Myongchon	Kim Tu-il
522	Ryongam	Pak Chol
523	Ryongban	Kim Won-hyok
524	Myonggan	Kang Chu-ryon
525	Orang	Sin Kon-nam
526	Odaejin	Jon Kum-wol
527	Kyongsong	Kim Nam-suk
528	Hamyon	Kim Sang-il
529	Sungam	So Sang-hyon
530	Puryong	Jong Myong-won
531	Musan	Yun Chol
532	Namsan	Jang Kum-sik
533	Sangchang	Kim Kwang-nam
534	Yonsa	Ro Song-kum
535	Hoeryong	Won Jong-hyon
536	Osandok	Ri Sun-sil
537	Hakpho	Ko Chang-guk
538	Yuson	Ri Ho-song
539	Wangjaesan	Kim Ok-ryon
540	Onsong	Kim Jun-il
541	Jongsong	Choe Yong-ho
542	Kyongwon	Sin Chol-ung
543	Kogonwon	Yang Ki-song
544	Ryongbuk	Kim Yong-jun
545	Kyonghung	Sin Kwang-hyok
546	Obong	Kim Ki-su
547	Sinjin	Jo Jong-ryong
548	Kyodong	Pak Sung-chol
549	Chongam	Kim Chol-ho
550	Ryonjin	Kim Kwang-il
551	Kanhae	Jin Kum-song
552	Phohang	Pak Pyong-su
553	Subuk	Kim Hyon-myong
554	Namhyang	Yun Hak-song
555	Malum	Kim Song-won
556	Sunam	Kim Ok-sil
557	Songpyong	Kim Ju-song
558	Sabong	Ri Kwang-ho
559	Kangdok	Kim Kwang-chol
560	Susong	Paek Kum-su
561	Ranam	Jon Yong-hak
562	Rabuk	Thae Jin-hyok
563	Namchongjin	Ri Yong-min
564	Buyun	Kang Yong-ju
565	Hyesan	Kim Yong-ho
566	Hyejang	Sin Chol-guk
567	Tapsong	Kim Ryong-il
568	Songbong	Choe Chang-hak
569	Ryonbong	Kim Hye-yong
570	Ryongha	Ri Myong-il
571	Wolthan	Kim Yong-nam
572	Koup	Ri Myong-hyok
573	Jigyong	O Kyong-hui
574	Pochon	Kim Kyong-chol
575	Samjiyon	Choe Ryon-hui
576	Taehongdan	Jong Chol-su
577	Paekam	Ko Jae-gil
578	Tokpho	Han Yong-ho
579	Unhung	Paek To-il
580	Kapsan	Ji Hyong-rok
581	Oil	Han Su-kyong
582	Phungso	Ri Song-guk
583	Samsu	Ryu Un-sop
584	Hanggu	Ri Ryong-jun
585	Hupho	Ri Song-nam
586	Undok	Ri Yong-min
587	Konguk	Yun Jong-ho
588	Ryusa	So Chang-ryol
589	Waudo	Kim Kum-ryong
590	Tonui	Hong Jong-sim
591	Masan	Song Sung-chol
592	Taedae	Kim Ho-chol
593	Kapmun	Pak Sung-il
594	Kangso	Kim Il-hyon
595	Sohak	Ri Myong-gi
596	Chongsan	Yun Chun-hwa
597	Sogi	Kim Myong-nam
598	Sammyo	Ri Il-hwan
599	Chollima	Kim Hyok
600	Kangson	Ri Kon-song
601	Pobong	Han Song-chol
602	Hwasok	Ri Hong-rim
603	Taean	Kim Man-hyong
604	Oksu	Kim Il-gyong
605	Ryonggang	Ri Yong-sik
606	Ryongho	Pak Ho-chol
607	Onchon	Kim Jong-hwan
608	Hanhyon	Ho Yong-man
609	Sohwa	Pak Jong-chol
610	Kwisong	Im Jun-hyok
611	Tongmyong	Chae Jong-ok
612	Rajin	Sin Yong-chol
613	Changpyong	Choe Chon-guk
614	Sonbong	Choe Yong-bo
615	Ungsang	Sin Chang-il
616	Kaesong	Ri Yong-gun
617	Sonjuk	Choe Kyong-nam
618	Songgyungwan	Chon Yong-se
619	Unhak	Choe Kwang-min
620	Kaepung	Kim Sun-myong
621	Uipho	Pak Song-chol
622	Phanmun	Jong Kyong-thaek
623	Chaeryon	Kim Yong-gil
624	Jangphung	Ko Myong-hwa
625	Kuhwa	Ri Sung-jin
626	Jihyesan	No Kwang-chol
627	Kanbaeksan	Paek Sang-chol
628	Unphasan	Pak Kwang-sop
629	Chilbongsan	Pak Hui-chol
630	Myolaksan	Kim Kwang-hyok
631	Madusan	Pak Kyong-ho
632	Pongsusan	Kim Jong-gwan
633	Taedoksan	Kim Kyong-ho
634	Kyongamsan	Kang Sun-nam
635	Jangjasan	Kim Pong-ho
636	Jangsusan	Pak Yong-song
637	Taesongsan	Pak Yong-il
638	Mannyonsan	Ri Jun-sik
639	Kuwolsan	Kim Hung-gyo
640	Maebongsan	Ju Tong-chol
641	Chonmasan	Ri Kyong-chol
642	Muhaksan	Kim Sang-gap
643	Sungrisan	Ri Chang-gil
644	Osongsan	Kwon Yong-chol
645	Kwanmosan	So Chun-sik
646	Wolbisan	Wi Sung-chol
647	Turyusan	Ri Kang-chol
648	Paekmasan	Choe Chang-gi
649	Songaksan	Hong Chol-ung
650	Suyangsan	Ri Song-chol
651	Sindoksan	Kim Hak-chol
652	Tonghungsan	Ji Yong-bok
653	Ogasan	Ko Myong-su
654	Paekhaksan	Kim Song-gi
655	Ryongaksan	Ham Hyo-sik
656	Songchongang	Ko In-chol
657	Kuryonggang	Choe Yong-ho
658	Pukchonggang	Choe Kwang-il
659	Chailgang	Kim Tok-ho
660	Biryugang	Ri Yong-chol
661	Hapjanggang	Jon Yong-jun
662	Jangjagang	Kim Yong-su
663	Songryonggang	Kil Song-ung
664	Kumjingang	Kil Ryong-gun
665	Woegumgang	An Yong-sik
666	Rimjingang	Kim Pong-chol
667	Haegumgang	Ok Ki-nam
668	Ryesonggang	Kim Hyo-nam
669	Kumchongang	Pak Chang-son
670	Taedonggang	Un Chol-ho
671	Chongchongang	Kim Yong-gun
672	Amnokgang	Kim Kang-il
673	Tumangang	Kwon Thae-yong
674	Namchongang	Kim Thae-gun
675	Naegumgang	Sin Ki-chol
676	Hyoksin	Yu Kwang-u
677	Hwaebul	O Pyong-chol
678	Sobaeksu	Kim Kyong-ryong
679	Kumsu	Pak Yong-gwan
680	Moranbong	Ri Chol-nam
681	Haebang	Ri Chang-dae
682	Misan	Rim Yong-chol
683	Pyoldong	Pang Tu-sop
684	Jonjin	Sim Hong-bin
685	Jasonggang	So Hong-chan
686	Ponghwasan	Jong Tae-nam
687	Kumgangsan	Kim Pok-nam

== Aftermath ==
The Standing Committee of the Supreme People's Assembly announced that deputy registration would take place on 21 March 2026, while the 1st Session of the 15th Supreme People's Assembly will be convened in Pyongyang on 22 March 2026, departing from previous practice where first session of a newly elected assembly was normally held approximately one month after the election. It added that the meeting agenda would include the election of the president of the State Affairs Commission, elections to state leadership and sub-committees of the SPA, revision and supplement of the constitution, the five-year plan and issues related to the state budget.

== See also ==
- Elections in North Korea
