= Yu Kwang-u =

North Korean politician

- 유광우

Member of the Supreme People's Assembly
- Incumbent
- Assumed office 2026

Member of the Politburo of the 9th Central Committee of the WPK
- Incumbent
- Assumed office 2026

Personal details
- Party: Workers' Party of Korea

Yu Kwang-u (Korean: 유광우) is a North Korean military officer and politician. He currently serves as the First Deputy Director of the General Political Bureau of the Korean People's Army and as a member of the 9th Politburo of the 9th Central Committee of the Workers' Party of Korea as well as a deputy to the 15th convocation of the Supreme People's Assembly.

== Biography ==
On February 22, 2026, he was elected as a member of the 9th Central Committee at the 9th WPK Congress and on February 23, he was elected as a member of the Central Military Commission at the expanded 1st Plenary Meeting of the 9th Central Committee.

On March 15, 2026, during the 2026 parliamentary election he was elected as a deputy to the 15th convocation of the Supreme People's Assembly.

On August 29, 2026, at the 2nd Meeting of the 9th Central Military Commission, he was appointed First Deputy Director of the General Political Bureau, a position that had remained vacant for ten years following the dismissal of Kim Won-hong. At the same time, he was elected to fill a vacancy in the Politburo. As former General Political Bureau Director, Kim Song-gi was transferred to the position of Minister of National Defence without a successor being named for the bureau, Yu Gwang-u serves as the acting Director of the General Political Bureau.
