= 9th Central Military Commission of the Workers' Party of Korea =

The 9th Central Military Commission of the Workers' Party of Korea (Korean: 제9기 조선로동당 중앙군사위원회) was elected at the 1st Plenary Session of the 9th WPK Central Committee in the immediate aftermath of the 9th Congress in February 2026.

== Plenary meetings ==
- 1st Enlarged Plenary Meeting: 10 July 2026
- 2nd Plenary Meeting: 29 August 2026

== Leadership ==
- Chairman: Kim Jong Un
- Vice Chairman:
  - Jong Kyong-thaek
  - Pak Jong-chon, from 29 August 2026

== Members ==
The following were elected as members of the 9th Central Military Commission.

The names of members are listed according to the order of their election at the 1st plenary meeting of the 9th Central Committee.

Rank	Name	Korean	8th (Note: Status in the 8th Central Military Commission at the end of its term.)
1	Kim Jong Un	김정은	Yes
2	Jong Kyong-thaek	정경택	Yes
3	Jo Chun-ryong	조춘룡	No
4	No Kwang-chol	노광철	No
5	Kim Song-gi	김성기	No
6	Ri Yong-gil	리영길	Yes
7	Pang Tu-sop	방두섭	No
8	Choe Chun-gil	최춘길	No
9	Kim Jong-sik	김정식	No
10	Yu Kwang-u	유광우	No
11	Ri Chang-ho	리창호	Yes
–	Pak Jong-chon (Note: Pak Jong-chon was by-elected on 29 August 2026.)	박정천	Yes

According to political analysts, the inclusion of Jo Chun-ryong in the 9th CMC strengthens his role in advancing the 2nd Five-Year Weapons Development Plan (2026–2030).
