= Choe Chun-gil =

North Korean politician

- 최춘길

Director of the WPK CC Civil Defense Department
- Incumbent
- Assumed office 23 February 2026
- General Secretary: Kim Jong Un

Member of the WPK Central Military Commission
- Incumbent
- Assumed office 23 February 2026

Member of the Supreme People's Assembly
- Incumbent
- Assumed office 2026

Personal details
- Party: Workers' Party of Korea

Choe Chun-gil (Korean: 최춘길) is a North Korean military officer and politician who currently serves as the Director of the Civil Defense Department of the Central Committee of the Workers' Party of Korea.

== Biography ==
He joined the WPK Central Committee as an alternate member during the 5th Plenary Meeting of the 7th Central Committee in December 2019. Subsequently, at the 8th WPK Congress in January 2021, he was promoted to a full member of the 8th Central Committee. However, it appears he was dropped from the Central Committee shortly thereafter, as it was confirmed that he re-entered the organization as an alternate member during the 4th Plenary Meeting of the 8th Central Committee in December 2021. In May 2022, his name appeared on the state funeral committee list for Hyon Chol-hae.

He was promoted back to a full member of the WPK Central Committee at the 9th WPK Congress in February 2026. At the subsequent enlarged meeting of the 1st Plenary Session of the 9th Central Committee, he was appointed as a member of the 9th convocation of the Central Military Commission and as a department director. His role as Director of the Civil Defense Department was confirmed during the military parade held after the party congress. In March 2026, he was elected as a deputy to the 15th convocation of the Supreme People's Assembly. He attended the enlarged meeting of the 2nd Plenary Session of the 9th Central Committee held from June 20 to 22, ranking first among the central committee members, and attended the 2nd meeting of the 9th Central Military Commission on August 29, 2026.
