= Pak Kwang-ung =

North Korean politician

- 박광웅

Member of the Politburo of the WPK Central Committee
- Incumbent
- Assumed office 2026

Member of the Supreme People's Assembly
- Incumbent
- Assumed office 2026

Personal details
- Party: Workers' Party of Korea

Military service
- Branch/service: Social Security Forces
- Rank: Major general

Pak Kwang-ung (Korean: 박광웅) is a North Korean politician. He currently serves as an alternate member of the Politburo of the Central Committee of the Workers' Party of Korea, Director of the Legal Department, and Vice Chairman of the Central Auditing Commission.

== Biography ==
In January 2021, he was elected as a member of the 8th Central Committee and appointed as a member of the 8th Central Auditing Commission at the 8th WPK Congress.

On February 22, 2026, he was re-elected as a member of the 9th Central Committee at the 9th WPK Congress. On February 23, at the enlarged meeting of the First Plenary Session of the 9th Central Committee, he was appointed as an alternate member of the 9th Politburo and as a department director. as well as member of the 9th Central Auditing Commission.

On the 2026 parliamentary election he was elected to the 15th convocation of the Supreme People's Assembly.
