= 1992 North Korean coup attempt =

- Date: 25 April 1992
- Location: Pyongyang (North Korea)
- Type: Military coup
- Motive: Killing Kim Il Sung and Kim Jong Il
- Outcome: Coup fail: Executions of coup affiliates

A group of North Korean students planned to use a tank loaded with a live shell during a military parade officially commemorating the 60th anniversary of the Korean People's Army on 25 April 1992, with the intention to fire it on the tribune as the vehicle passed the reviewing stand to kill North Korean leader Kim Il Sung and his son Kim Jong Il, as well as members of the country's top leadership. The plan failed after one of the department chiefs in the Ministry of the People's Armed Forces switched the tanks used in the parade to be from the Ministry instead of the capital defense division.

== History ==
In the 1980s, Soviet leader Mikhail Gorbachev launched the perestroika policy, introducing political reforms to the Soviet Union. A group of North Korean students studying at the Frunze Military Academy were influenced by the reforms, and wanted a similar change in North Korea. However, they thought that such reforms were unlikely to take place as long as the Kim family maintained power.

In 1992, preparations were made for a military parade to be held on 25 April, officially commemorating the 60th anniversary of the Korean People's Army. One of the students in the group suggested the parade as the venue where the Kim family would be most vulnerable. They planned loading one of the tanks in the parade with a real shell, and firing when a group of tanks would be passing next to the tribune containing North Korea's leadership, killing North Korean leader Kim Il Sung and his son Kim Jong Il, as well as members of the country's top leadership.

However, one of the department chiefs in the Ministry of the People's Armed Forces switched the tanks used in the parade to be from the Ministry instead of the capital defense division; the official made the change despite being unaware of the coup plans. As the students were planning to use one of the tanks of the capital defense division, this led the plan to unravel, and the parade went as scheduled.

== Aftermath ==
It took time for the North Korean officials to learn about the plot. Kim Il Sung and Kim Jong Il were shocked to learn about it, and ordered an investigation and purges. The conspirators were arrested, tortured and executed. Since the plotters were trained officials, this led the North Korean military to severely lack trained pilots for a few years.
