= Ju Chang-il =

North Korean politician

- 주창일
- Supreme Leader: Kim Jong-un

Director of the Propaganda and Agitation Department
- Incumbent
- Assumed office 2022
- Preceded by: Pak Thae-song

Member of the Politburo of the WPK Central Committee
- Incumbent
- Assumed office 2026

Member of the Supreme People's Assembly
- Incumbent
- Assumed office 2026

Personal details
- Citizenship: North Korean
- Party: Workers' Party of Korea

Ju Chang-il (Korean: 주창일) is a North Korean politician. He serves as an alternate member of the Politburo of the Central Committee of the Workers' Party of Korea and as the Director of the Propaganda and Agitation Department of the WPK Secretariat.

== Biography ==
In 2008, he received his doctorate while serving as a department chair at Kim Il Sung University. He subsequently held positions as the Dean of the Faculty of Philosophy and as a vice-president of the university. He was elected as an alternate member of the WPK Central Committee at the Central Committee's plenary meeting in June 2021 and was appointed Director of the Propaganda and Agitation Department of the WPK Secretariat in February 2022. Later, at the enlarged plenary meeting of the 6th Plenary Meeting of the 8th Central Committee held in late December 2022, he was elected as an alternate member of the 8th Politburo of the 8th WPK Central Committee. Following the 9th WPK Congress he was appointed to the 9th Secretariat and the 9th Politburo. Following the 2026 North Korean parliamentary election he became part of the 15th Supreme People's Assembly and appointed as a member of the 15th State Affairs Commission.
