= Politburo of the Workers' Party of Korea =

North Korean decision-making body

Political Bureau of the Central Committee of the Workers' Party of Korea 조선로동당중앙위원회정치국

Leadership
- Status: Executive WPK body between the Presidium and Central Committee, Workers' Party of Korea
- Elected by: Central Committee
- Responsible to: Central Committee
- Seats: 17

- Politburo of the Workers' Party of Korea
- Chosŏn'gŭl: 조선로동당 중앙위원회 정치국
- Hancha: 朝鮮勞動黨 中央委員會 政治局
- Revised Romanization: Joseon Rodongdang Jungang Wiwonhoe Jeongchiguk
- McCune–Reischauer: Chosŏn Rodongdang Chungang Wiwŏnhoe Chŏngch'iguk

The Political Bureau of the Central Committee of the Workers' Party of Korea, or simply the Politburo, formerly the Political Committee (1946–61), is the executive committee of the Central Committee of the Workers' Party of Korea.

Currently, the bureau is a group of 17 top officials who oversee the party and central government. The politburo is headed by the general secretary. Unlike the politburos of other communist parties, the WPK Politburo subdelegates many of its powers to the smaller Politburo Presidium.

The Politburo is elected by the Central Committee of the Workers' Party of Korea, and is the highest decision-making body in WPK between sessions of the Central Committee. Article 25 of the Party Charter stipulates that "The Political Bureau of the Party Central Committee and its Presidium organize and direct all party work on behalf of the party Central Committee between plenary meetings. The Political Bureau of the Party Central Committee shall meet at least once every month." The general secretary of the Workers' Party of Korea convenes and presides over Politburo meetings.

== History ==
Until April 1956, the Politburo was known as the Political Council. After Kim Il Sung's unitary ruling system was established in the 1960s, the Politburo was transformed from a decision-making body where policies could be discussed into a rubber stamp body. Leading members have disappeared without explanation; the last was Kim Tong-gyu, in 1977. Politburo members under Kim Il Sung and Kim Jong Il lacked a strong power base, and depended on the party leader for their position. Because of this, the Politburo became a loyal servant of the party leader.

The Politburo Standing Committee (PSC) of the Workers' Party of Korea was established at the 6th Congress in 1980, and became the highest WPK body when the Politburo and the Central Committee were not in session. With the death of O Jin-u in 1995, Kim Jong Il remained the only member of the Politburo Standing Committee still alive; the four others (Kim Il Sung, Kim Il, O Jin-u, and Ri Jong-ok) died in office. Between O Jin-u's death and the 3rd Conference, there were no reports indicating that Kim Jong Il or the central party leadership was planning to renew the PSC composition.

Similar to the Central Committee, the Politburo was dormant during much of Kim Jong Il's rule; however, the 3rd Conference elected new Politburo members. While many foreign observers believed it would signify a generational shift, it did not; the youngest member was 53 years old, and the average age was 74 (with 12 over age 80). The majority of new members were aides to Kim Jong Il or Kim family members. Kim Kyong-hui (Kim Jong Il's sister) and Jang Song-thaek (Kim Kyong-hui's husband) were appointed full and candidate member, respectively. Several of Jang's protégés were elected candidate members, including Ju Sang-song (Minister of People's Security), U Tong-chuk (First Deputy Director of the State Security Department) and Choe Ryong-hae (Secretary for Military Affairs). Pak Jong-su (First Deputy Head of the Organization and Guidance Department), a leading facilitator of Kim Jong Un's succession, was appointed a candidate member. Most of the new members were cabinet members, military officials, party secretaries or officials from the security establishment. Ten members from the National Defense Commission and three deputy premiers were appointed to the Politbüro. Leading economic experts (such as Hong Sok-yong and Tae Jong-su) and foreign experts (such as Kang Sok-ju, Kim Yong-il and Kim Yang-gon) became members. At the 4th Conference, one-third of the Politburo was dismissed in unannounced retirements and dismissals. Jang Song-thaek, Pak To-chun and Vice Marshal Kim Jong-gak were promoted from candidate to full membership; Hyon Chol-hae, Kim Won-hong and Ri Myong-su, all members of the Central Military Commission, were appointed to full Politburo membership. Kwak Pom-gi, O Kuk-ryol, Ro Tu-chol, Ri Pyong-sam and Jo Yon-jun were elected candidate members.

== Role ==
Officially, the Politburo is responsible for conducting its activities as well as deciding on important issues between two Central Committee plenums and should meet once a month. Its members include important state and military leaders, such as the Premier and the vice-chairmen of the State Affairs Commission as of June 2025.

The Politburo's inner body is the Presidium (formerly the Standing Committee), elected by the WPK Central Committee, in charge of day-to-day party work. It is usually made up of the supreme leader and four other members. In practice, the Presidium is the highest body in both the party and the country, and its decisions de facto have the force of law.

== Current membership ==
As of March 2026, the Politburo is composed of 19 members and 11 alternate members, with the following line-up.

=== Members ===
Member	Member since	Party position(s)	State position(s)
Kim Jong Un 김정은 (born 1984)	11 April 2012	General Secretary of the Workers' Party of Korea; Politburo Presidium Member; Chairman of the Central Military Commission	President of State Affairs; Supreme Commander of the Armed Forces
Pak Thae-song 박태성 (born 1955)	10 January 2021	Politburo Presidium Member	Vice President of the State Affairs Commission; Premier
Jo Yong-won 조용원	10 January 2021	Politburo Presidium Member	First Vice President of the State Affairs Commission; Chairman of the Standing Committee of the Supreme People's Assembly; Chairman of the Supreme People's Assembly
Kim Jae-ryong 김재룡	9 April 2019	Politburo Presidium Member; Secretary of the Central Committee; Director of the Organization and Guidance Department	Member of the State Affairs Commission
Ri Il-hwan 리일환	31 December 2019	Politburo Presidium Member; Secretary of the Central Committee; Director of the Workers' and Social Organizations Department	Member of the State Affairs Commission
Jong Kyong-thaek 정경택 (born 1961)	10 April 2019	Vice Chairman of the Central Military Commission; Secretary of the Central Committee; Director of the Military Leadership Department	Member of the State Affairs Commission
Kim Song-nam 김성남	23 February 2026 (alt. since 11 February 2021)	Director of the International Affairs Department	Member of the State Affairs Commission; Chairman of the Supreme People's Assembly Foreign Affairs Committee
Sin Yong-il	23 February 2026	Secretary of the Central Committee; Department director	
Ri Hi-yong	27 December 2024	Secretary of the Central Committee; Chairman of the Central Auditing Commission; Director of the Cadre Affairs Department	Member of the State Affairs Commission; Chairman of the Supreme People's Assembly Legislation Committee
Ju Chang-il	23 February 2026 (alt. since 31 December 2022)	Secretary of the Central Committee; Director of the Publicity and Information Department	
Jo Chun-ryong 조춘룡	10 April 2019	Secretary of the Central Committee; Director of the Munitions Industry Department; Member of the Central Military Commission	
An Kum-chol	23 February 2026	Secretary of the Central Committee; Director of the Economic Affairs Department	Chairman of the Supreme People's Assembly Budget Committee
Kim Jong-gwan 김정관	27 December 2024	Secretary of the Central Committee; Department director	
Kim Sung-du	23 February 2026	Secretary of the Central Committee; Director of the Science and Education Department	
Choe Son-hui 최선희	27 December 2024 (alternate since 20 April 2020)		Member of the State Affairs Commission; Minister of Foreign Affairs
No Kwang-chol 노광철	27 December 2024	Member of the Central Military Commission	Member of the State Affairs Commission; Minister of National Defence
Kim Song-gi 김성기	23 February 2026	Director of the KPA General Political Bureau; Member of the Central Military Commission	
Kim Tok-hun 김덕훈 (born 1962)	31 December 2019		Member of the State Affairs Commission; First Vice Premier
Pak Jong-gun 박정근	31 December 2021		Vice Premier; Chairman of the State Planning Commission

=== Alternate members ===
Alternate member	Alternate member since	Party position(s)	State position(s)
Kim Yo Jong 김여정	23 February 2026	Director of the General Affairs Department	
Pak Kwang-ung	23 February 2026	Vice Chairman of the Central Auditing Commission; Director of the Discipline Inspection Department	
Han Kwang-sang 한광상	8 June 2022	Director of the Light Industry Department	
Ju Chol-gyu	23 February 2026	Director of the Agriculture Department	
Jon Hyon-chol 전현철	23 February 2026		Vice Premier
Pak Hun	23 February 2026		Vice Premier
Ri Chol-man 리철만	10 January 2021		Vice Premier; Chairman of the Agricultural Commission
Ri Yong-gil 리영길 (born 1955)	10 January 2021	Member of the Central Military Commission	Chief of the Korean People's Army General Staff
Ri Chang-dae 리창대	8 June 2022		Member of the State Affairs Commission; Minister of State Security
Pang Tu-sop	27 December 2024		Member of the State Affairs Commission; Minister of Public Security
Kim Chol-won	27 December 2024		Procurator-General of the Central Prosecutor's Office

== See also ==
- Politburo of the Communist Party of the Soviet Union
- Politburo of the Chinese Communist Party

== Bibliography ==
Articles, books and journal entries

- Haggard, Stephen; Herman, Luke; Ryu, Jaesung (July–August 2014). "Political Change in North Korea: Mapping the Succession". Asian Survey. 54 (4). University of California Press: 773–780. doi:10.1525/as.2014.54.4.773. JSTOR 10.1525/as.2014.54.4.773.
- Kim, Nam-Sik (Spring–Summer 1982). "North Korea's Power Structure and Foreign Relations: an Analysis of the Sixth Congress of the KWP". The Journal of East Asian Affairs. 2 (1). Institute for National Security Strategy: 125–151. JSTOR 23253510.
- Lankov, Andrei N. (1999). "Kim Il Sung's Campaign against the Soviet Faction in Late 1955 and the Birth of Chuch'e". Korean Studies. 23 (1): 43–67. doi:10.1353/ks.1999.0003. ISSN 1529-1529. S2CID 154905899.
- Staff writer (2014) [2012]. Understanding North Korea. Ministry of Unification.

Books

- Buzo, Adrian (1999). The Guerilla Dynasty: Politics and Leadership in North Korea. I.B. Tauris. ISBN 1860644147.
- Gause, Ken E. (2011). North Korea Under Kim Chong-il: Power, Politics, and Prospects for Change. ABC-CLIO. ISBN 978-0313381751.
- — (2013). "The Role and Influence of the Party Apparatus". In Park, Kyung-ae; Snyder, Scott (eds.). North Korea in Transition: Politics, Economy, and Society. Rowman & Littlefield. pp. 19–46. ISBN 978-1442218123.
- Kim, Samuel (2000). "North Korean Informal Politics". Informal Politics in East Asia. Cambridge University Press. ISBN 0521645387.
- Lankov, Andrei (2007). Crisis in North Korea: The Failure of De-Stalinization, 1956. University of Hawaii Press. ISBN 978-0824832070.
- Suh, Dae-sook (1988). Kim Il Sung: The North Korean Leader (1st ed.). Columbia University Press. ISBN 0231065736.
