= An Kum-chol =

North Korean politician

- 안금철

Member of the WPK 9th Politburo
- Incumbent
- Assumed office 2026

Member of the WPK Central Committee
- Incumbent
- Assumed office 2021

Member of the Supreme People's Assembly
- Incumbent
- Assumed office 2014

Personal details
- Party: Workers' Party of Korea

An Kum-chol (Korean: 안금철) is a North Korean politician. He currently serves as the Secretary for Economic Affairs and Director of the Economic Affairs Department of the Central Committee of the Workers' Party of Korea.

== Biography ==
During the March 2014 parliamentary election, he was elected as a deputy to the 13th convocation of the Supreme People's Assembly. He appeared as a secretary of the South Pyongan Provincial Party Committee in a Rodong Sinmun article dated April 30, 2015.

In January 2021, at the 8th Party Congress, he was elected as a member of the 8th Central Committee and promoted to Chief Secretary of the South Pyongan Provincial Party Committee, succeeding Kim Du-il. Although his name did not appear on the list of deputies elected to the 14th Supreme People's Assembly in April 2019, he attended the 4th Session of the 14th Supreme People's Assembly in January 2021 as a deputy.

Subsequently, after attending various events in South Pyongan Province, he led the province's Worker-Peasant Red Guards contingent at the paramilitary parade marking the 73rd anniversary of the founding of the DPRK on September 9. In September 2021, he was elected as a member of the Legislation Committee of the Supreme People's Assembly during the 5th Session of the 14th Supreme People's Assembly.

On February 22, 2026 he was re-elected as a member of the 9th Central Committee at the 9th Congress of the Workers' Party of Korea. and was also elected a member of the 9th Politburo.

In November 2025 he was a member of the funeral committee of Kim Yong-nam.
