= Sin Yong-il =

North Korean politician

- 신영일

Member of the Politburo of the WPK Central Committee
- Incumbent
- Assumed office 2026

Personal details
- Party: Workers' Party of Korea

Sin Yong-il (Korean: 신영일) is a North Korean politician. He currently serves as a member of the Politburo of the Central Committee of the Workers' Party of Korea and the head of the Disciplinary Investigation Department.

== Biography ==
On February 22, 2026, he was elected as a member of the Central Committee at the 9th Congress of the Workers' Party of Korea, and on February 23, he was by-elected as a member of the Politburo at the enlarged meeting of the 1st Plenary Session of the 9th Central Committee and appointed as Secretary and Deputy Director of the Central Committee of the Party. He attended the enlarged meeting of the 2nd Plenary Session of the 9th Central Committee of the Workers' Party of Korea held from June 20-22, 2026. On July 27, 2026 he attended the commemorative march ceremony marking the 73rd anniversary of the Day of Victory in the Great Fatherland Liberation War.
