= Ri Chang-ho =

North Korean politician

- 리창호
- Supreme Leader: Kim Jong-un

Director of the Reconnaissance General Bureau
- Incumbent
- Assumed office 2023

Member of the WPK 9th Central Committee
- Incumbent
- Assumed office 2026

Personal details
- Citizenship: North Korean
- Party: Workers' Party of Korea

Military service
- Rank: Lieutenant General

Ri Chang-ho (Korean: 리창호) is a North Korean military officer and politician who serves as the Director of the Reconnaissance General Bureau of the General Staff of the Korean People's Army and as an alternate member of the 9th convocation of the Central Committee of the Workers' Party of Korea.

== Biography ==
He was appointed Director of the Reconnaissance General Bureau of the KPA General Staff during the enlarged 5th Plenary Meeting of the 8th Central Committee of the Workers' Party of Korea. He currently holds the rank of Lieutenant General in the Korean People's Army Ground Force.
