= Jang Chang-ha =

North Korean general and a politician (born 1964)

Hero of the Republic Jang Chang-ha
- 장창하

Commander of the DPRK Missile Administration
- Incumbent
- Assumed office Unknown
- Supreme Commander: Kim Jong Un
- Deputy Commander: Kim Jong-sik
- Preceded by: Position established

Personal details
- Born: 10 January 1964 (age 62) (according to British Treasury Information) North Korea
- Citizenship: North Korean
- Party: Workers' Party of Korea

Military service
- Allegiance: North Korea
- Branch/service: Korean People's Army
- Rank: General
- Commands: Missile Administration

Jang Chang-ha (also known as Jang Chang Ha, Korean: 장창하, born 10 January 1964) is a North Korean general and a politician.

== Biography ==
Little is known about Jang Chang-ha's birthplace, birthdate, and age. According to British Treasury information, he was born on 10 January 1964.

Jang is a double Hero of the Republic and Hero of Labor. He was presumably awarded Hero of the Republic after the success test fire of Hwasong-17.

As of 2021, he is in the forefront of North Korea's missile development, with the title of president at the Academy of National Defense Science.

On 26 November 2022, he was promoted to Taejang by Kim Jong Un.

In 2023, he was confirmed to serve as Head of the Missile General Bureau (now Missile Administration), which oversees missile tests by the DPRK.

He was spotted with his wife at a New Year performance on 31 December 2024.

As of 2026, North Korean state media refers to him as the Missile Administration's general director.
