= Kim Song-nam (politician) =

North Korean politician (born 1953)

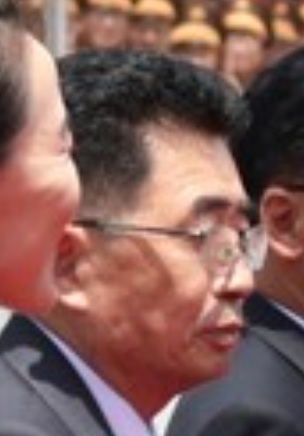

Member of the State Affairs Commission
- Incumbent
- Assumed office 22 March 2026
- Supreme Leader: Kim Jong Un

Personal details
- Born: 1953 (age 72–73) North Pyongan Province, North Korea
- Party: Workers' Party of Korea

Korean name
- Hangul: 김성남
- Hanja: 金成男
- RR: Gim Seongnam
- MR: Kim Sŏngnam

Kim Song-nam (Korean: 김성남; born 1953) is a North Korean politician who serves as candidate-member of the Politburo of the Workers' Party of Korea.

== Biography ==
Kim was born in North Pyongan Province in 1953. He joined the International Department of the Workers' Party of Korea in the 1980s and acted as an interpreter during visits to China by President Kim Il Sung and General Secretary Kim Jong Ilas well as during meetings with Chinese officials. In January 2010, he was appointed vice director of International Affairs Department of the Workers' Party of Korea. In May 2016, at the 7th Congress of the Workers' Party of Korea, he was elected as a candidate member of the Central Committee of the Workers' Party of Korea. In October 2017, at the 2nd Plenary Meeting of the 7th Workers' Party of Korea, he was elected as a full member of the Party Central Committee. He is the head of the Party's International Department, replacing Kim Hyong-jun and a candidate member of the Politburo.
