= Kim Song-gi (North Korean general) =

North Korean politician

- 김성기

Minister of National Defense
- Incumbent
- Assumed office 29 August 2026
- Supreme Leader: Kim Jong-un
- Preceded by: No Kwang-chol

Personal details
- Citizenship: North Korean
- Party: Workers' Party of Korea

Military service
- Allegiance: North Korea
- Branch/service: Korean People's Army
- Rank: Daejang (대장)

Kim Song-gi (Korean: 김성기) is a North Korean politician.

== Biography ==
On February 2026, following the 9th WPK Congress, he was elected as a member of the 9th Convocation of the Central Committee of the Workers' Party of Korea 9th Convocation of the Central Military Commission of the Workers' Party of Korea.

On August 30, 2026, the Korean Central News Agency reported that No Kwang-chol had been dismissed as the defense minister, with Song-gi having replacing him.
