= Ministry of National Defence (North Korea) =

North Korean government ministry

- Flag used by the Ministry of Defence

Agency overview
- Jurisdiction: State Affairs Commission of North Korea
- Headquarters: Pyongyang, North Korea; 39°3′39″N 125°44′20″E
- Minister responsible: General Kim Song-gi

Korean name
- Hangul: 국방성
- Hanja: 國防省
- RR: Gukbangseong
- MR: Kukpangsŏng

The Ministry of National Defence (Korean: 국방성; formerly Ministry of the People's Armed Forces (Korean: 인민무력성; Hanja: 人民武力省)) is the government agency under the State Affairs Commission tasked with general administrative and logistical coordination of the Korean People's Army (KPA). The current Minister of National Defence is General Kim Song-gi.

== History ==
Until December 1972, the Minister of the People's Armed Forces was called the Minister of National Defence (민족보위상). It then changed to the Ministry of the People's Armed Forces.

Prior to 1992, it was under the direct control of commander-in-chief and president, with guidance from the National Defence Commission and the Workers' Party Central Military Commission. The 1992 amendment to the Constitution of North Korea shifts its control to the National Defence Commission. The 2016 amendment shifted its control to the State Affairs Commission. It was renamed to the Ministry of National Defence in October 2020.

== Duties ==
The Ministry of Defence handles the KPA's logistical, administrative, and diplomatic functions and components. The ministry also coordinates relations with foreign militaries.

Until the late 2000s, the General Staff Department (GSD)--which is responsible for the daily operational planning and management of the KPA's ground, naval, and air commands--and the General Political Bureau (GPB) fell under the ministry. During that time, the ministry conveyed the orders and guidance of the KPA Commander-in-Chief and--through the GSD and GPB--developed strategy, conducted education and training, and completed certain signals intelligence tasks. However, the ministry's role is currently limited to military administration, logistics, and diplomacy.

The ministry reportedly has or had departments tasked with regulating Government-owned corporations related to the defence industry and other foreign currency earning ventures.

== Departments ==
The Ministry of National Defence contains the following departments:

- General Political Bureau
- General Staff Department
- Security Command

Both the Director of the General Political Bureau and Chief of the General Staff have more power than the Minister.

== Ministers of Defence ==
No.	Portrait	Minister	Took office	Left office	Time in office	Defence branch
1	Choe Yong-gon최용건	Vice Marshal; Choe Yong-gon 최용건 (1900–1976)	September 1948	September 1957	9 years	Korean People's Army Ground Force
2	Kim Kwang-hyop김광협	General; Kim Kwang-hyop 김광협 (1915–1970)	September 1957	October 1962	5 years, 1 month	Korean People's Army Ground Force
3	Kim Chang-bong김창봉	General; Kim Chang-bong 김창봉 (born 1919)	October 1962	December 1968	6 years, 2 months	Korean People's Army Ground Force
4	Choe Hyon최현	General; Choe Hyon 최현 (1907–1982)	December 1968	May 1976	7 years, 5 months	Korean People's Army Ground Force
5	O Jin-u오진우	Marshal; O Jin-u 오진우 (1917–1995)	May 1976	February 1995	18 years, 9 months	Korean People's Army Ground Force
6	Choe Kwang최광	Marshal; Choe Kwang 최광 (1918–1997)	October 1995	February 1997	1 year, 4 months	Korean People's Army Ground Force
7	Kim Il-chol김일철	Vice Marshal; Kim Il-chol 김일철 (1933–2023)	February 1997	February 2009	12 years	Korean People's Navy
8	Kim Yong-chun김영춘	Vice Marshal; Kim Yong-chun 김영춘 (1936–2018)	February 2009	April 2012	3 years, 2 months	Korean People's Army Ground Force
9	Kim Jong-gak김정각	Vice Marshal; Kim Jong-gak 김정각 (born 1941)	April 2012	November 2012	7 months	Korean People's Army Ground Force
10	Kim Kyok-sik김격식	General; Kim Kyok-sik 김격식 (1938–2015)	November 2012	May 2013	6 months	Korean People's Army Ground Force
11	Jang Jong-nam장정남	General; Jang Jong-nam 장정남	May 2013	June 2014	1 year, 1 month	Korean People's Army Ground Force
12	Hyon Yong-chol현영철	General; Hyon Yong-chol 현영철 (1949–2015)	June 2014	12 May 2015	11 months	Korean People's Army Ground Force
Unknown (12 May 2015 – 11 July 2015)
13	Pak Yong-sik박영식	General; Pak Yong-sik 박영식 (born 1950)	11 July 2015	4 June 2018	2 years, 10 months	Korean People's Army Ground Force
14	No Kwang-chol노광철	General; No Kwang-chol 노광철 (born 1956)	4 June 2018	December 2019	1 year, 6 months	Korean People's Army Ground Force
15	Kim Jong-gwan김정관	General; Kim Jong-gwan 김정관	December 2019	29 September 2021	1 year, 8 months	Korean People's Army Ground Force
16	Ri Yong-gil리영길	Vice Marshal; Ri Yong-gil 리영길 (born 1955)	29 September 2021	31 December 2022	1 year, 3 months	Korean People's Army Ground Force
17	Kang Sun-nam강순남	General; Kang Sun-nam 강순남	31 December 2022	8 October 2024	1 year, 9 months	Korean People's Army Ground Force
18	No Kwang-chol노광철	General; No Kwang-chol 노광철 (born 1956)	8 October 2024	29 August 2026	1 year, 10 months	Korean People's Army Ground Force
19	Kim Song-gi김성기	General; Kim Song-gi 김성기 (born 1957)	29 August 2026	Incumbent	1 month	Korean People's Army Ground Force

== See also ==
- Commander-in-Chief of North Korea
- General Staff Department of the Korean People's Army
- General Political Bureau of the Korean People's Army
