= Kim Jong-sik =

North Korean politician

Personal details
- Citizenship: North Korean
- Party: Workers' Party of Korea
- Occupation: Military officer, politician

Military service
- Allegiance: North Korea
- Branch/service: Korean People's Army
- Rank: General

Kim Jong-sik is a North Korean politician and general who is serving is deputy director of the Munitions Industry Department of the WPK Central Committee.

== Biography ==
Little is known about him. He has background the space and missile industry, being a rocket scientist who previously working in the Second Academy of Natural Sciences and the North Korean space agency. He was involved in the development of Unha-3 rocket and Sohae Satellite Launching Station. In November 2022 he was appointed 4-star general.
