= Jong Kyong-thaek =

North Korean politician

Colonel General Jong Kyong-thaek

Director of the KPA General Political Bureau
- Incumbent
- Assumed office 2022
- Preceded by: Kwon Yong-jin

Minister of State Security
- In office 2018–2022
- Supreme Leader: Kim Jong Un
- Preceded by: Kim Won-hong
- Succeeded by: Ri Chang-dae

Personal details
- Born: between 1 January 1961 and 31 December 1963 Chagang Province, North Korea
- Party: Workers' Party of Korea

Military service
- Allegiance: North Korea
- Branch/service: Korean People's Army
- Rank: Colonel general

- Jong Kyong-thaek
- Hangul: 정경택
- Hanja: 鄭京澤
- RR: Jeong Gyeongtaek
- MR: Chŏng Kyŏngt'aek

Jong Kyong-thaek (Korean: 정경택, born between 1 January 1961 and 31 December 1963) is a North Korean politician. He served as the Minister of State Security from 2018 to 2022, a member of the Central Military Commission of the Workers' Party of Korea (WPK), an alternate member of the Politburo of the WPK, and a member of the State Affairs Commission of North Korea.

== Family background ==
Jong's father was Jong Jun-thaek, an intellectual at the core of North Korea's early industrialization efforts under Kim Il Sung and who served as the DPRK's Deputy Premier from 1956 to 1961. Chong headed national industrial planning between 1945 and 1950. He worked closely with Kim Il Sung, traveling with the leader to meet Stalin in Moscow in March 1949, and joining Kim's new Military Affairs Commission with the outbreak of the Korean War. After the war he headed North Korea's chemical industry. Jong Jun-thaek had an economics university named after him (Chong Jun Taek Kyongje Daehak) in Kangwon in 1960. He travelled to Syria and Sudan in 1972 on diplomatic missions, meeting President Assad. Chong died in 1973 when his son was 10 or 12 years old.

== Career ==
Jong's appears to have made his career with the Korean People's Army. He first surfaced as a public figure in November 2015, when he was listed on the funeral committee for Ri Ul-sol, the Korean People's Army General and elder Manchurian guerrilla veteran. In early 2017, Kim Won-hong was removed from the role of Minister of State Security (also known as the Director of the State Security Department, SSD). Won-hong had apparently been punished following a party inspection. The appointment of Jong Kyong-thaek as Minister came at the same time as Choe Ryong-hae was appointed director of the Organization and Guidance Department (OGD) which works closely with the SSD. According to North Korea Leadership Watch, "Choe's appointment along with the appointment of Jong Kyong Thaek at State Security are no accident... Choe and Jong's new positions represent a kind of house cleaning to avoid some of the problems that have affected State Security during the last 18 months. Choe and Jong's appointments are also intended to usher in 3rd generation DPRK cadres in the internal security services."

In this capacity, Jong directs both censorship and counter-intelligence. For instance, during Kim Jong Un's trip to the 2018 North Korea–United States Singapore Summit, Jong "supervised the collection, consolidation and analysis of myriad intelligence reports from around the DPRK derived from eavesdropping and SSD's pyramid-like human intelligence networks. Col. Gen. Jong probably supervised the mobilization of additional electronic capabilities and personnel to monitor the DPRK's defense industry."

Since October 2017, Jong has been a member of the Central Military Commission of the Workers' Party of Korea (WPK) and an alternate member of the Politburo of the WPK. At the sixth session of the 13th Supreme People's Assembly on 11 April 2018, Jong also took Kim Won-hong's seat in the State Affairs Commission of North Korea. Jong's military rank is colonel general. He resides in Pyongyang.

On 10 December 2018, the Office of Foreign Assets Control of the United States Department of the Treasury imposed sanctions on Jong and two other top North Korean leaders, citing abuses and Jong's role in the government of North Korea and the WPK, a step criticized by the Rodong Sinmun.

On 22 March 2021, the Council of the European Union imposed a set of restrictive measures against Kyong-thaek giving the reason for listing: "As Head of the Ministry of State Security, Jong Kyong-thaek is responsible for serious human rights violations in the DPRK, in particular torture and other cruel, inhuman or degrading treatment or punishment, extrajudicial, summary or arbitrary executions and killings, enforced disappearance of persons, and arbitrary arrests or detentions, as well as widespread forced labour and sexual violence against women."

Jong was part of a high-level welcoming delegation for China's leader Xi Jinping and his wife Peng Liyuan, greeting them both at the Kumsusan Palace of the Sun square and attending an artistic performance with them in Pyongyang on 20 June 2019.

Jong was promoted to the rank of general on 23 May 2020. On 30 September 2020, he was reported to be demoted to Colonel General, before being promoted to general again. Now he is director of the KPA General Political Bureau. In May 2025, at a meeting of the Central Military Commission, Jong was demoted to Colonel General, the lowest rank of an incumbent GPB director since the 1970s. In February 2026 during the 9th Congress of the Workers' Party of Korea he was appointed vice chairman of the 9th Central Military Commission.

== Awards and honors ==
The official portrait of Jong shows him wearing the ribbons of all decorations awarded to him.

== See also ==
- Censorship in North Korea
- Politics of North Korea

Political offices
Preceded by Kim Won-hong	Minister of State Security; 2018–2022	Succeeded by Ri Chang-dae
