= Kim Kwang-hyok (politician) =

North Korean general and politician

- 김광혁

Commander of the Korean People's Army Air and Anti-Air Force
- Incumbent
- Assumed office Unknown
- Supreme Commander: Kim Jong Un
- Preceded by: Marshal Ri Pyong-chol

Personal details
- Born: North Korea
- Citizenship: North Korean
- Party: Workers' Party of Korea

Military service
- Allegiance: North Korea
- Branch/service: Korean People's Army Air Force
- Rank: General
- Commands: Korean People's Army Air and Anti-Air Force

Kim Kwang-hyok (Korean: 김광혁) is a North Korean general and a politician.

During Kim's visit to Russia, Kim was seen wearing two Hero of the DPRK medals which speculates Kim was awarded a double Hero, However the awarding date was not reported by the KCNA.

== Biography ==
In December 2001, the hero title was bestowed upon him in a ceremony, in which Paek Hak-rim was in attendance.

In May 2016, after being listed in the Korean People's Army, he was appointed a candidate member of the 7th Central Committee at the 7th Congress. In December 2016, Choi Young-ho was appointed the commander of the Korean People's Army Air and Anti-Air Force. On October 7, 2017, at the 2nd plenary session of the 7th Central Committee he became a full (voting) member. At the time of Kim Yong-chun's death in August 2018, he served as a member of the funeral committee. On the 14th of April 2022 he was appointed to General rank by the order of the Central Military Commission.
