= Kim Hyong-sik =

North Korean politician

Vice Chairman of the Standing Committee of the Supreme People's Assembly
- Incumbent
- Assumed office 22 March 2026
- Chairman: Jo Yong-won
- Preceded by: Choe Ryong-hae

DPRK Cabinet Minister
- Supreme Leader: Kim Jong Il

Personal details
- Citizenship: North Korean
- Party: Workers' Party of Korea

- Kim Hyong-sik
- Hangul: 김형식
- RR: Gim Hyeongsik
- MR: Kim Hyŏngsik

Kim Hyong-sik (Korean: 김형식) is a North Korean politician. He is a member of the Central Committee of the Workers' Party of Korea and a member of the 12th convocation of the Supreme People's Assembly, North Korea's unicameral parliament.

== Biography ==
In 2000, he served as the manager of the Shinchang Coal Mine, and in January 2005, he was appointed as the Minister of Electricity and Coal Industry. but was demoted to Deputy Minister in May. In October 2006, when the Ministry of Electricity and Coal Industry was separated into the Ministry of Electricity Industry and the Ministry of Coal Industry, it was revealed that he had been appointed Minister of Coal Industry in September 2007, serving until October 2011. In September 2010, following the 3rd WPK conference he was elected a member of the 6th Central Committee of the Workers' Party of Korea.

In April 2009 he was elected to the 12th convocation of the Supreme People's Assembly.

He served as a member of the funeral committee at the time of the death of Jo Myong-rok in 2010 and following the death of Kim Jong Il in 2011

On 22 March 2026, he was elected as a vice chairman of the Supreme People's Assembly Standing Committee.
