= Ju Chol-gyu =

North Korean politician

Vice Premier of North Korea
- President: Kim Jong Un

Minister of Agriculture
- Incumbent
- Assumed office 2021
- Preceded by: Ko In-ho

Personal details
- Born: North Korea
- Party: Workers' Party of Korea

Korean name
- Hangul: 주철규
- RR: Ju Cheolgyu
- MR: Chu Ch'ŏlgyu

Ju Chol-gyu (Korean: 주철규) is a North Korean politician. He is a member of the Central Committee of the Workers' Party of Korea and a candidate (alternate) member of the Politburo of the Workers' Party of Korea. He is currently the Vice Premier of the Cabinet and minister of agriculture.

== Biography ==
During the 8th Congress of the Workers' Party of Korea held from 5 to 12 January 2021, he was elected a member of the Central Committee. and a member of the 8th Politburo of the Workers' Party of Korea. On 17 January 2021, at the 4th plenary session of the 14th Supreme People's Assembly, he was appointed to the Minister of Agriculture and then the chairman of the South Hwanghae Province Rural Accounts Committee in 2020. At the 8th Congress of the Workers' Party of Korea held in January 2021, he was elected as a member of the Central Committee of the Workers' Party of Korea, and at the 4th meeting of the 14th Supreme People's Assembly held subsequently, he was elected as the Vice Premier and Chairman of the Agricultural Committee. Later, he attended the second plenary session of the 8th Workers' Party of Korea held in early February and guided the Agricultural Subcommittee Conference, and was in charge of discussions with Kim Gwang-nam and Ma Jong-seon at the expanded meeting of the Cabinet Plenary Meeting on the 25th of the same month. In May 2022, at the time of Hyon Chol-hae's death, he served as a member of the National Funeral Committee. In March 2023 he participated in expanded meeting on the 1st of the 7th plenary session of the 8th Central Committee of the Workers' Party of Korea to prepare rural development strategies and economic revitalization plans where he made a speech. On 26 December 2022 he participated in event to commemorate the 50th anniversary of the North Korean constitution.
