= Pak Jong-gun =

North Korean politician, vice premier of North Korea

- 박정근

Vice Premier of North Korea
- Incumbent
- Assumed office 2013
- Supreme Leader: Kim Jong Un

Personal details
- Citizenship: North Korean
- Party: Workers' Party of Korea

Korean name
- Hangul: 박정근
- RR: Bak Jeonggeun
- MR: Pak Chŏnggŭn

Pak Jong-gun (Korean: 박정근) is a North Korean politician who is serving as a member of the Politburo of the Workers' Party of Korea and Vice Premier of North Korea as well as chairman of the National Planning Commission.

== Biography ==
In January 2021 he was promoted to a member of the 8th Central Committee at the 8th Congress of the Workers' Party of Korea, and was elected as a candidate member of the Politburo as a vice-chairman of the National Planning Commission at the 1st Central Committee of the 8th Congress on January 10. On December 31, 2021, he was promoted to a member of the Politburo at the 4th Plenary Session of the 8th Workers' Party of Korea and head of the National Planning Commission under the Cabinet of North Korea. On April 10, he was included in the group of leaders at the Central Reporting Conference on the 10th anniversary of the appointment of Kim Jong Un.
