= Pang Tu-sop =

North Korean general and politician

- 방두섭

Member of the WPK 7th CC
- Supreme Leader: Kim Jong-un

Personal details
- Citizenship: North Korean
- Party: Workers' Party of Korea

Military service
- Allegiance: North Korea
- Branch/service: Korean People's Army

Pang Tu-sop (Korean: 방두섭) is a North Korean army general and politician.

== Biography ==
He was known to be appointed commander of the Second Corps of the Korean People's Army in 2015. In May 2016, following the 7th Congress of the Workers' Party of Korea he was elected a full member of the 7th Central Committee of the Workers' Party of Korea.
