= No Kwang-chol =

North Korean general and politician

General of the Army No Kwang-chol
- 노광철
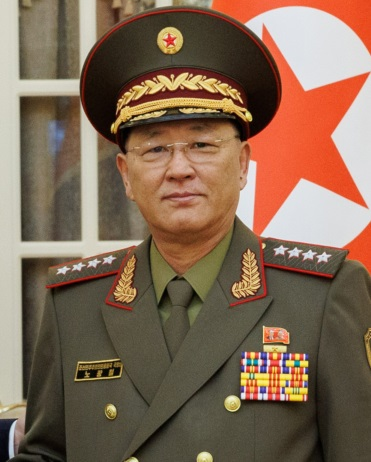

Minister of Defence
- In office 8 October 2024 – 29 August 2026
- Preceded by: Kang Sun-nam
- Succeeded by: Kim Song-gi
- In office 4 June 2018 – 21 December 2019
- Preceded by: Pak Yong-sik
- Succeeded by: Kim Jong-gwan

Personal details
- Born: 1956 (age 69–70) Nampo, North Korea
- Party: Workers' Party of Korea

Military service
- Allegiance: North Korea
- Branch/service: Korean People's Army
- Rank: General

Korean name
- Hangul: 노광철
- Hanja: 努光鐵
- RR: No Gwangcheol
- MR: No Kwangch'ŏl

No Kwang-chol (Korean: 노광철; Hanja: 努光鐵; born 1956) is a North Korean soldier, a four-star general, and a member of the political bureau, who served as Minister of Defence of North Korea from 2024 to 2026. He previously held the same office from 2018 to 2019.

== Biography ==
No was born in 1956.

He was elected as a member of the Supreme People's Assembly following the 2003 election and 2009 election. In the September 2010 Representative Conference, he was elected as an alternate (candidate) member of the Central Committee of the Workers' Party of Korea. In December 2011, Kim Jong Il died and he was included as one of the members of his funeral committee.

In June 2018, he was promoted from first vice minister to Minister of People's Armed Forces.

On June 12, 2018, Trump and Kim Jong Un were meeting in Singapore. At the meeting, Trump wanted to shake hands with No, who was accompanying Kim Jong Un in the meeting, but No did not shake hands but saluted Trump. After Trump hesitated, he saluted him and the two shook hands.

On 21 December 2019 he was replaced by Kim Jong-gwan. From 12 April 2019 to 12 April 2020 he served as a member of the State Affairs Commission. Since his dismissal as minister, No reportedly headed a research institute under the General Staff Department of the Korean People's Army, and was observed attending meetings including the enlarged meetings of the WPK Central Military Commission.

On 8 October 2024, during 11th Session of the 14th Supreme People's Assembly, No Kwang-Chol was reappointed as the minister of Defence.

In November 2024, No Kwang-Chol held talks with his Russian counterpart, Andrei Belousov, mere months after North Korean troops entered the Russo-Ukrainian war.

On August 29, 2026, at a meeting of the Ninth Central Military Commission of the Workers' Party of Korea, No Kwang-chol was dismissed from his post. He was succeeded by Kim Song-gi.

== Sanctions ==
As North Korea's defence minister, No Kwang-Chol has faced multiple international sanctions for a variety of reasons, from the country's nuclear programme to its human rights abuses to, most notably, his role in the Russo-Ukrainian war.

On December 16, 2024, No Kwang-Chol was sanctioned by the United States, European Union, and South Korea over the role of North Korean troops in the Russo-Ukrainian war.

On February 24, 2025, the third anniversary of the 2022 Russian invasion of Ukraine, the British Foreign Office placed him on a list of UK sanctions over his role in the sending of North Korean troops to fight on Russia's behalf in Ukraine.

== Awards and honours ==
A picture of No shows him wearing the ribbons to all decorations awarded to him.

Political offices
Preceded by Pak Yong-sik	Minister of People's Armed Forces; 2018–2019	Succeeded by Kim Jong-gwan
Preceded by Kang Sun-nam	Minister of Defence; 2023–2026	Succeeded by Kim Song-gi
Incumbent
