= 9th Congress of the Workers' Party of Korea =

2026 party congress in North Korea

9th Congress of the Workers’ Party of Korea
- Logo for the 9th Party Congress
- Date: 19–25 February 2026 (7 days)
- Location: April 25 House of Culture, Pyongyang, North Korea
- Participants: 5,000 delegates
- Outcome: Election of the 9th Central Committee and the re-election of Kim Jong Un as General Secretary

- 9th Congress of the Workers' Party of Korea
- Hangul: 조선로동당 제9차대회
- Hanja: 朝鮮勞動黨 第9次大會
- RR: Joseon rodongdang je9cha daehoe
- MR: Chosŏn rodongdang che9ch'a taehoe

The 9th Congress of the Workers' Party of Korea was held at the April 25 House of Culture in Pyongyang on 19 to 25 February 2026. The Congress is the highest organ of the Workers' Party of Korea (WPK), and is stipulated to be held every five years. The conference had 5,000 delegates and 2,000 observers.

Preparations for the Congress began in June 2025, while the Congress opened in February 2026. During the Congress, WPK General Secretary Kim Jong Un delivered a report on the work of the outgoing 8th Central Committee. On the fourth day of the Congress, Kim Jong Un was re-elected as general secretary. The Congress also endorsed the amendments to the WPK Rules and the election of the 9th Central Committee. On the fifth day, the 9th Central Committee held its first enlarged plenary meeting, which elected the WPK's Politburo and its Presidium, the Secretariat, the Central Military Commission, the Central Auditing Commission and Directors for Central Committee Departments.

== Preparation ==
On 24 June 2025, the plenary meeting of the 8th Central Committee of the Workers' Party of Korea approved a plan to hold the 9th Party Congress. On 13 September 2025, General Secretary of the Workers' Party of Korea Kim Jong Un announced that the 9th Congress would "put forward the policy of simultaneously pushing forward the building of nuclear forces and conventional armed forces in the field of building up national defense". On 18 February 2026, North Korea displayed 50 nuclear-capable rocket launchers "as a present for a glorious congress".

== Delegates and attendees ==
The meeting of awarding certificates of delegates for the 9th Congress took place in the Kumsusan Palace of the Sun on 17 February 2026. There is a total of 5,000 delegates to the 9th WPK Congress. Of the 5,000 delegates, 224 were members of the 8th WPK Central Committee and 4,776 delegates were elected by party conferences to represent party members and candidate members. 413 delegates were women, which is a decrease of 88 from the 501 women delegates in the 7th Congress. There were also 2,000 observers, which is the same as the 8th Congress. Delegates were observed wearing standardized red conference badges displaying their photo and name, as well as the party badge, a practice which NK News noted is similar to that of the National Congresses of the Chinese Communist Party. Kim Il Sung and Kim Jong Il were posthumously declared to be delegates to the party congress.

| Sector | Delegates | | +/– |
| Sector | 9th Congress | 8th Congress | +/– |
|---|---|---|---|
| Party and political workers | 1,902 | 1,959 | −57 |
| Hardcore party members in field labor | 1,524 | 1,455 | +69 |
| State administration and economy | 747 | 801 | −54 |
| Military | 474 | 408 | +66 |
| Science, education, public health, art, literature and media | 321 | 333 | −12 |
| Working people's organizations | 32 | 44 | −12 |
| Total delegates | 5,000 | 5,000 | 0 |

Korean Social Democratic Party chairman Kim Ho Chol and Chondoist Chongu Party chairman Ri Myong Chol were invited to attend the congress. The following delegates were elected as members of the party congress' presidium:

- Kim Jong Un
- Pak Thae Song
- Choe Ryong Hae
- Jo Yong Won
- Ri Il Hwan
- Pak Jong Chon
- Ri Hi Yong
- Jo Chun Ryong
- Kim Tok Hun
- Choe Tong Myong
- Choe Son Hui
- No Kwang Chol
- Ri Pyong Chol
- Jong Kyong Thaek
- Ri Yong Gil
- Kim Jae Ryong
- Pak Jong Gun
- Kim Jong Gwan
- Ju Chang Il
- Kim Hyong Sik
- Han Kwang Sang
- Ju Chol Gyu
- Kim Song Nam
- Ri Chol Man
- Ri Chang Dae
- Pang Tu Sop
- Kim Chol Won
- Kim Su Gil
- Kang Yun-sok
- Jon Sung Guk
- Kim Myong Hun
- Jong Myong Su
- Kim Jong Sun
- O Il Jong
- Kim Jong Sik
- Kim Yo Jong
- Ko Pyong Hyon
- Jang Ki Ho
- Choe Kun Yong

The following delegates were elected as members of the party congress' secretariat:

- Kim Pong Chol
- Ju Un Chol
- Sin Chol Man
- Choe Chang Hak
- Choe Hak Gun

== The Congress ==
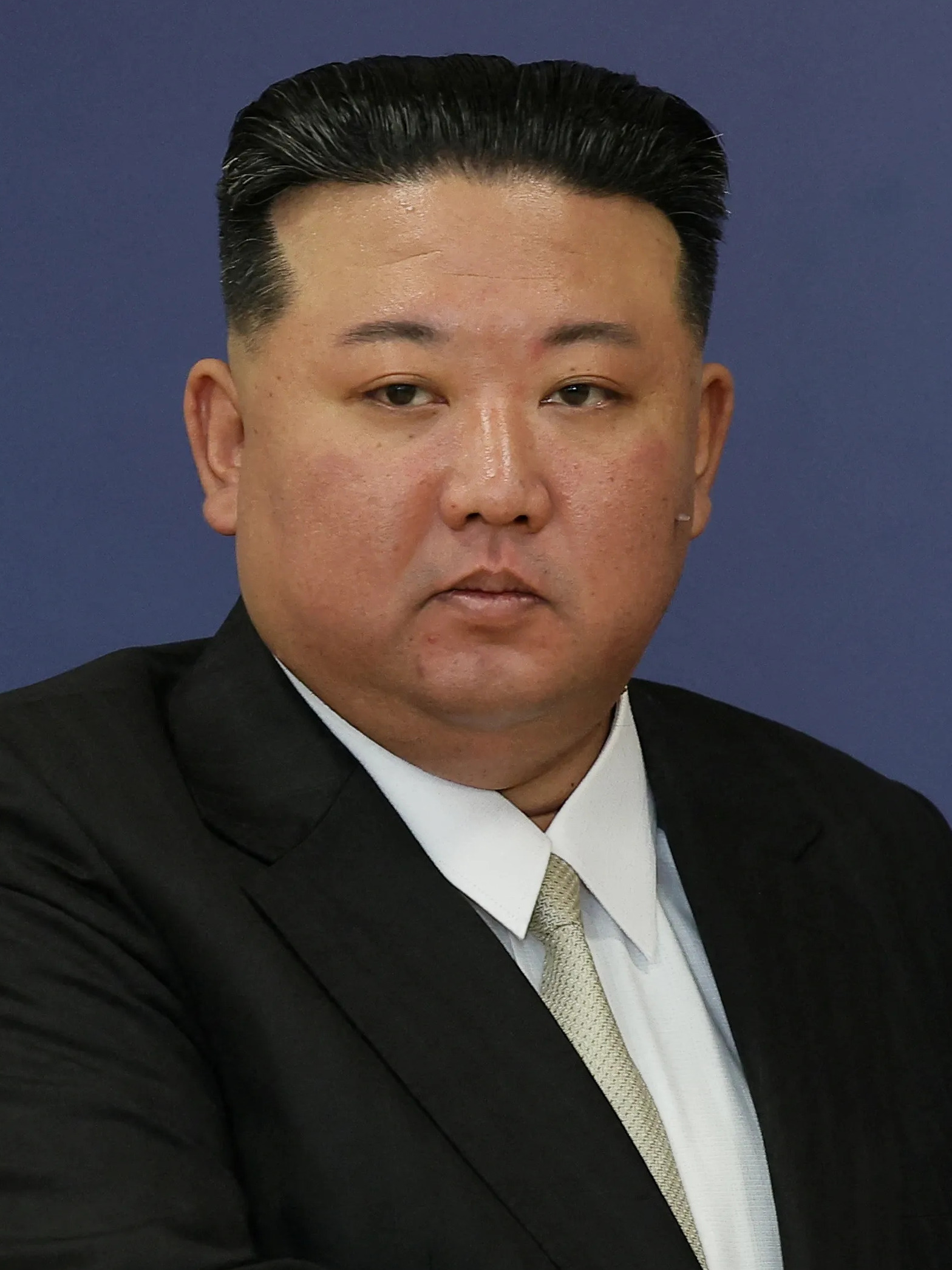
General secretary Kim Jong Un delivered the Congress's opening statement and was re-elected for another five-year term.

The 9th Congress opened on 19 February 2026 in Pyongyang. WPK general secretary Kim Jong Un made an opening statement at the Congress. At the speech, Kim expressed "confidence" in North Korea, stating that "everything has fundamentally changed" for the better since the 8th Congress in 2021, including overcoming the "barbaric blockade" of sanctions by "hostile forces" and "creating favorable conditions" in foreign affairs. He stated that "Never has there been such a period as this one, in which we achieved so great successes despite the severity of trials and difficulties". However, he said that "deep-rooted defeatism, irresponsibility, conservatism, formalism and immaturity in leadership ability are latent at present in the work of the Party and government organs and officials".

The general agenda for the 8th Party Congress were as follows:

- Review on the work of the outgoing 8th Central Committee
- Amendments to the Rules
- Election of Kim Jong Un to the office of General Secretary of the WPK
- Election of the 9th Central Committee of the WPK and bodies subordinated to the Central Committee, as well as of other Party agencies

On the second day of the Congress on 20 February, Kim Jong Un started a series of speeches on the review of the work of the 8th Central Committee. According to the Korean Central News Agency, the review covered "politics, economy, culture, defense, diplomacy and other fields". On the third day of the Congress on 21 February, Kim continued his report. He outlined the "new fighting strategy" to guide the country and detailed the achievements in the report. Jang Kyong Guk, chief secretary of the Sinpo City Party Committee, and Foreign Minister Choe Son Hui also delivered speeches reviewing last five years.

On the fourth day of the Congress on 22 February, after a proposal by the Propaganda and Agitation Department director Ri Il-hwan, Kim Jong Un was re-elected as WPK general secretary for another five-year term. The Korean Central News Agency reported that it was a unanimous decision among delegates. Kim ran on the platform of continuing North Korea's nuclear arms program. The decision document praised him for having "built a revolutionary armed force capable of proactively responding to any invasion threat and fully prepared for any form of war." The Party congress also adopted a revision on the Rules of the Workers' Party of Korea, but no details were given. The amendments included the incorporation of the five-point Party-building line in the new era. The Congress elected the members and alternate members of the 9th Central Committee. On the fifth day of the Congress on 23 February, the 9th Central Committee held its first enlarged plenary meeting, which elected the WPK's Politburo and its Presidium, the Secretariat, the Central Military Commission, the Central Auditing Commission and Department Directors for Central Committee Departments, and approved personnel nominations for the Cabinet and Standing Committee of the Supreme People's Assembly. Kim also gave a concluding speech on the day, where he promised "more substantial benefits" to reach the public while criticizing "extreme negligence, irresponsibility and fixation on immediate gains" in the management of newly built production and service facilities, while also promising to continue the country's "Three Revolutions" in the fields of ideology, technology and culture. The Congress continued holding sector-level meetings on the sixth day on 24 February, where party cadres "intensified the discussion on the orientation and plans of the work of different sectors and units" that included a "five-year strategy" that was presented earlier, with the results to be "submitted to the committee for drafting the decision of the Party Congress".

For the strengthening and development of our Party, and for the prosperity of our country, the 9th Congress of the Workers' Party of Korea, based on the firm will and unanimous demands of all delegates, millions of Party members, the people of the whole country, and officers and soldiers of the People's Army, has decided to wholeheartedly support Comrade Kim Jong Un as General Secretary of the Workers' Party of Korea

— Resolution of the 9th Congress of the Workers' Party of Korea, 23 February 2026

The Congress concluded on 25 February. After the conclusion of the Congress, KCNA reported that Kim stated North Korea is prepared for "peaceful coexistence or eternal confrontation" with the United States based on its response to the North Korean nuclear program, while stating that "If the U.S. respects our country's current status as stipulated in the Constitution of the DPRK and withdraws its hostile policy toward the DPRK, we have no reason not to get along with the U.S." He ruled out abandoning nuclear weapons, and said "Under the banner of so-called 'America First,' the U.S. has no regard for the sovereignty, territorial integrity, and security interests of other countries, and has been advocating 'peace through strength' solely to satisfy its hegemonic ambitions, without hesitation in invading and using force against sovereign nations". He rejected dialogue with South Korea, stating North Korea would continue the policy where "all ties with South Korea have been completely eliminated", continuing by saying "The DPRK has absolutely no business dealings with the Republic of Korea, its most hostile entity, and will forever exclude South Korea from the category of fellow countrymen". He rejected the possibility of Korean reunification, accusing South Korea of trying to reunite the Peninsula under the "capitalist reactionary system of liberal democracy". He added that North Korea would "continuously develop and advance our traditional friendly and cooperative relations with neighboring countries" and advance relations with "anti-imperialist and independent countries". He called for further developing North Korea's military and nuclear weapons. He stated North Korea would develop its economy in a five-year plan building local industrial plants, hospitals and service facilities in 20 cities and counties every year under the 20x10 Policy, and called for turning Pyongyang into a "world-class city" while developing less affluent towns. He stressed developing emerging industries, including space technology, artificial intelligence and newer forms of energy. Regarding culture, he called for the literature and arts to develop "the revolutionary consciousness".

On the night of 25 February after the Congress's conclusion, North Korea held a military parade in Kim Il Sung Square featuring over 14,000 troops. Kim delivered a speech at the event, saying that "Our military will immediately launch devastating retaliatory strikes against any military hostile act by any force that violates the sovereignty and security interests of our country". Kim appeared together with his wife, Ri Sol-ju, as well as his daughter, Kim Ju Ae. On 26 February, Kim Jong Un led members of the 9th WPK Central Committee to visit the Kumsusan Palace of the Sun. Yonhap News Agency reported that Kim Jong Un's move may have been a signal to promote the achievements of the 9th Congress, strengthen the unity of the 9th Central Committee, and supervise the implementation of the matters determined at the 9th Congress.

== Reactions ==
On 20 February 2026, the Rodong Sinmun included letters from United Russia chairman Dmitry Medvedev and the Central Committee of the Chinese Communist Party congratulating the start of the Congress. Medvedev writing that "The strategic partnership between Russia and the DPRK is based on a long-standing tradition of friendship and cooperation, on this basis, our states are firmly repelling external pressure while ensuring stability and security in the Asia-Pacific region, while stating that the WPK had an "increasingly meaningful role" in the relationship. The letter from the CCP praised Kim Jong Un and the WPK for "economic development and improving the people's living standards", while stressing that relations had entered a new stage under Kim and General Secretary of the Chinese Communist Party Xi Jinping, promising to deepen exchanges with the WPK for "the sake of stable relations, the socialist cause in both countries and regional peace and prosperity". Rodong Sinmun also included letters from several North Korea-affiliated organizations of overseas ethnic Koreans including the General Association of Koreans in China and the Chongryon (General Association of Korean Residents in Japan). On 21 February, Rodong Sinmun further published congratulatory messages from the Communist Party of Vietnam, the Lao People's Revolutionary Party and the Communist Party of the Russian Federation.

Following Kim's election as general secretary, CCP General Secretary Xi Jinping sent a letter of congratulations, praising Kim for "achieving new results in building a Korean socialist country" and saying the re-election reflects "the high trust and heartfelt support" of the party, the government and the people. He also referred to China and North Korea as "friendly socialist neighbors" and said it was China's "unwavering policy" to develop relations.
