= 4th Supreme People's Assembly =

North Korean government body

- Sign of the Supreme People's Assembly

14 December 1967 – 25 December 1972 (5 years, 11 days) Overview
- Type: Session of the Supreme People's Assembly
- Election: 25 November 1967

Leadership
- Chairman: Paek Nam-un
- Vice Chairmen: Yi Ki-yong; Kim Tuk-nan

Members
- Total: 457 deputies

The 4th Supreme People's Assembly (SPA) was elected on 25 November 1967 and convened for its first session on 14–16 December 1967. It was replaced on 25 December 1972 by the 5th Supreme People's Assembly.

== Meetings ==
Meeting	Start–end	Length	Session agenda
1st Session	14–16 December 1967	3 days	8 items: 1. Establishing the 4th Credentials Committee.; 1. Election of chairman and ordinary members; 1. Yi Kuk-chin elected as chairman with Kim Sok-yong, Kim Yong-ho, Yim Hyong-gu, Choe Chong-gon, Yi Tal-yong and Yi Kye-san elected as ordinary members.; 2. Election of the permanent committees of the 4th SPA.; 1. Establishment of the Bills Committee of the Supreme People's Assembly.; 1. Elections of Bills Committee chairman; 1. Kim Yo-jung elected.; 2. Election of members to the Bills Committee; 1. Yi Yong-gu, Kim Chwa-hyok, Paek Hak-nim, Yi Rim-su, Yom Tae-jun, Kim Chang-bok, Ri Sung-gi and Kim Kuk-hun elected.; 2. Establishment of the Budget Committee of the Supreme People's Assembly.; 1. Elections of Budget Committee chairman; 1. Yim Kye-chol elected.; 2. Election of members to the Budget Committee; 1. Kang Hui-won, O Che-ryong, Yi Won-bom, Chang Yun-pil, Kim Sok-hyong, Yi Chong-guk, Yun Yon-hwan, Choe Chun-sop, Han Chong-gi and Kim Rak-hui elected.; 3. Establishment of the Foreign Affairs Committee of the Supreme People's Assembly.; 1. Elections of Foreign Affairs Committee chairman; 1. So Chol elected.; 2. Election of members to the Foreign Affairs Committee; 1. Chon Chang-chol, Kim Ok-sun, Choe Chung-guk, O Ki-chon, O Hyon-ju and Yi Yun-do elected.; 3. Discussion of decrees issued by the 3rd Standing Committee between the 7th Session of the 3rd Supreme People's Assembly and the 1st Session of the 4th SPA.; 1. Approved.; 4. Establishment the 4th Standing Committee.; 1. Election of Chairman; 1. Choe Yong-gon elected.; 2. Election of vice chairs; 1. Hong Myong-hui, Pak Chong-ae, Kang Yang-uk and Yi Yong-ho elected.; 3. Election of Secretary-General; 1. Pak Mun-gyu elected.; 4. Election of ordinary members; 1. Choe Hyon, Ho Pong-hak, Kim Yong-ju, Yi Kuk-chin, Choe Kwang, O Jin-u, Kim Tong-gyu, Pak Sin-dok and Kim Yo-jung elected.; 5. Election of the 4th Cabinet of North Korea.; 1. Election of Premier of the Cabinet; 1. Kim Il Sung elected.; 2. Kim Il-sung propose individuals to offices in the 4th Cabinet; 1. Proposal approved.; 6. Appointment of the Procurator-General of the Central Procurator's Office; 1. Yun Tae-hong appointed.; 7. Appointment of the Chief Justice of the People's Supreme Court; 1. Yi Yong-gu appointed.
2nd Session	25–27 April 1968	3 days	1 item: 1. Report by Minister of Finance Yun Ki-bok on the account of the 1967 state budget and proposed state budget for 1968; 1. Approved.
3rd Session	24–26 April 1969	3 days	1 item: 1. Report by Minister of Finance Yun Ki-bok on the account of the 1968 state budget and proposed state budget for 1969; 1. Approved.
4th Session	20–23 April 1970	4 days	1 item: 1. Report by Minister of Finance Choe Yun-su on the account of the 1969 state budget and proposed state budget for 1970; 1. Approved.
5th Session	12–14 April 1971	3 days	2 items: 1. On advocating Korean unification and on the current international environment; 1. Approved.; 2. Report by Minister of Finance Choe Yun-su on the account of the 1970 state budget and proposed state budget for 1971; 1. Approved.
6th Session	29–30 April 1972	2 days	2 items: 1. Speech by former King of Cambodia Norodom Sihanouk on the Cambodian people's struggle; 1. Approved.; 2. Report by Minister of Finance Choe Yun-su on the account of the 1971 state budget and proposed state budget for 1972; 1. Approved.

== Officers ==
=== Chairman ===
Name	Hangul	Took office	Left office	Duration
Paek Nam-un	백남운	16 December 1967	25 December 1972	10 years and 64 days

=== Vice Chairman ===
Name	Hangul	Took office	Left office	Duration
Yi Ki-yong	이기영	16 December 1967	25 December 1972	10 years and 64 days
Kim Tuk-nan	김득란	16 December 1967	25 December 1972	10 years and 64 days

== Deputies ==
Rank	Name	Hangul	3rd SPA	5th SPA	Supreme People's Assembly						Workers' Party of Korea					
Rank	Name	Hangul	3rd SPA	5th SPA	4th CAB	4th STC	4th BIL	4th BUD	4th CRE	4th FOA	4th CC	4th STP	4th POL	4th SEC	4th INS	4th CAC
1	Kim Il Sung	김일성	Old	Reelected	Premier	—	—	—	—	—	Member	Member	Member	Gen. Sec.	—	—
2	Choe Yong-gon	최용곤	Old	Reelected	—	Chair	—	—	—	—	Member	Member	Member	Member	—	—
3	Kim Il	김일	Old	Reelected	FV Premier	—	—	—	—	—	Member	Member	Member	Member	—	—
4	Kim Kwang-hyop	김광협	Old	Not	V Premier	—	—	—	—	—	Member	Member	Member	Member	—	—
5	Hong Myong-hui	홍명희	Old	Not	—	V. Chair	—	—	—	—	—	—	—	—	—	—
6	Nam Il	남일	Old	Reelected	V Premier	—	—	—	—	—	Member	—	—	—	—	—
7	Ri Jong-ok	리종옥	Old	Reelected	V Premier	—	—	—	—	—	Member	—	—	—	—	—
8	Pak Chong-ae	박종애	Old	Not	—	V. Chair	—	—	—	—	Member	—	—	—	—	—
9	Yi Chu-yon	이추연	Old	Not	V Premier	—	—	—	—	—	Member	—	—	—	—	—
10	Choe Hyon	최현	Old	Reelected	—	Member	—	—	—	—	Member	—	Member	—	—	—
11	Kim Chang-bong	김창봉	Old	Not	V Premier	—	—	—	—	—	Member	—	Member	—	—	—
12	Pak Song-chol	박송철	Old	Reelected	V Premier	—	—	—	—	—	Member	—	Member	—	—	—
13	Kim Ik-son	김익손	Old	Not	Control	—	—	—	—	—	Member	—	Member	—	Chairman	—
14	Yi Yong-ho	이용호	Old	Not	—	V. Chair	—	—	—	—	Member	—	Member	—	—	—
15	Sok San	속산	Old	Not	Security	—	—	—	—	—	Member	—	Member	Member	—	—
16	Ho Bong-hak	호봉학	Old	Not	—	Member	—	—	—	—	Member	—	Member	Member	—	—
17	Kim Yong-ju	김용주	Old	Reelected	—	Member	—	—	—	—	Member	—	Member	Member	—	—
18	Yi Kuk-chin	이국진	Old	Not	—	Member	—	—	Chairman	—	Member	—	—	Member	—	—
19	Chong Chun-taek	종춘택	Old	Reelected	V Premier	—	—	—	—	—	Member	—	—	—	—	—
20	Choe Yong-jin	최용진	Old	Reelected	V Premier	—	—	—	—	—	Member	—	—	—	—	—
21	Han Sang-du	한상두	Old	Not	Supply	—	—	—	—	—	Member	—	—	—	—	—
22	Hyon Mu-gwang	현무광	Old	Reelected	F Machine	—	—	—	—	—	Member	—	—	—	—	—
23	Choe Kwang	최광	Old	Not	—	Member	—	—	—	—	Member	—	Member	—	—	—
24	O Jin-u	오진우	Old	Reelected	—	Member	—	—	—	—	Member	—	Member	—	—	—
25	Kim Tong-gyu	김통규	Old	Reelected	—	Member	—	—	—	—	Member	—	Member	—	—	—
26	Chong Kyong-bok	종경복	New	Not	—	—	—	—	—	—	Member	—	Member	—	—	—
27	Hwang Sun-hui	황선희	Old	Reelected	—	—	—	—	—	—	Alternate	—	—	—	—	—
28	Choe Chong-gon	최종곤	New	Not	—	—	—	—	Member	—	Alternate	—	—	—	—	—
29	Chon Hui	촌휘	New	Not	—	—	—	—	—	—	—	—	—	—	—	—
30	Choe In-dok	최인독	New	Reelected	—	—	—	—	—	—	—	—	—	—	—	—
31	Chang Hui-do	장희도	New	Not	—	—	—	—	—	—	—	—	—	—	—	—
32	Kim Sang-jin	김상진	New	Reelected	—	—	—	—	—	—	—	—	—	—	—	—
33	Yi Son-bi	이선비	New	Not	—	—	—	—	—	—	—	—	—	—	—	—
34	Choe Un-hak	최은학	Old	Not	—	—	—	—	—	—	—	—	—	—	—	—
35	An Sang-chun	안상천	New	Not	—	—	—	—	—	—	—	—	—	—	—	—
36	Yang Ho-jae	양호재	New	Not	—	—	—	—	—	—	—	—	—	—	—	—
37	Kim Yun-son	김윤손	New	Not	—	—	—	—	—	—	—	—	—	—	—	—
38	Song Tok-hun	송톡훈	Old	Reelected	—	—	—	—	—	—	—	—	—	—	—	—
39	Choe Chae-ryon	최채련	New	Not	—	—	—	—	—	—	—	—	—	—	—	—
40	Kim Song-guk	김송국	New	Not	—	—	—	—	—	—	—	—	—	—	—	—
41	Yi Tong-il	이통일	New	Not	—	—	—	—	—	—	—	—	—	—	—	—
42	Kim Yong-chae	김용채	New	Reelected	—	—	—	—	—	—	—	—	—	—	—	—
43	Kim Yong-ho	김용호	Old	Not	—	—	—	—	—	—	—	—	—	—	—	—
44	Kim Myong-suk	김명숙	New	Not	—	—	—	—	—	—	—	—	—	—	—	—
45	Yi Ung-won	이웅원	Old	Reelected	—	—	—	—	—	—	—	—	—	—	—	—
46	Yi Myong-won	이명원	New	Reelected	—	—	—	—	—	—	—	—	—	—	—	—
47	Pak Su-bom	박수봄	New	Not	—	—	—	—	—	—	—	—	—	—	—	—
48	Hwang Chi-ryop	황치엽	New	Reelected	—	—	—	—	—	—	—	—	—	—	—	—
49	Kang Chae-won	강채원	New	Not	—	—	—	—	—	—	—	—	—	—	—	—
50	Yun Pyong-gwon	윤평권	Old	Reelected	—	—	—	—	—	—	—	—	—	—	—	—
51	Yi Che-jin	이체진	New	Not	—	—	—	—	—	—	—	—	—	—	—	—
52	Pak Nam-sun	박남선	New	Reelected	—	—	—	—	—	—	—	—	—	—	—	—
53	Paek Ui-myong	백의명	Old	Reelected	—	—	—	—	—	—	—	—	—	—	—	—
54	Yi Tan	이탄	Old	Not	—	—	—	—	—	—	—	—	—	—	—	—
55	O Myong-sop	오명섭	New	Not	—	—	—	—	—	—	—	—	—	—	—	—
56	Han Hyong-ho	한형호	New	Not	—	—	—	—	—	—	—	—	—	—	—	—
57	Pak Song-guk	박송국	Old	Not	—	—	—	—	—	—	—	—	—	—	—	—
58	Yi Pong-gyom	이퐁짐	New	Not	—	—	—	—	—	—	—	—	—	—	—	—
59	Kim Chong-tae	김종태	New	Not	—	—	—	—	—	—	—	—	—	—	—	—
60	Kang Hui-won	강희원	New	Reelected	—	—	—	Member	—	—	Member	—	—	—	—	—
61	Chong Yong-yol	종용열	New	Not	—	—	—	—	—	—	—	—	—	—	—	—
62	Kim Pok-son	김폭손	New	Not	—	—	—	—	—	—	—	—	—	—	—	—
63	Chi Pyong-hak	치평학	Old	Reelected	—	—	—	—	—	—	Member	—	—	—	—	—
64	Yi Yong-hui	이용희	New	Not	—	—	—	—	—	—	—	—	—	—	—	—
65	Ho Paek-nim	백님호	New	Reelected	—	—	—	—	—	—	—	—	—	—	—	—
66	Chu Ho-sun	추호선	New	Not	—	—	—	—	—	—	—	—	—	—	—	—
67	Kim Po-ok	김포옥	New	Not	—	—	—	—	—	—	—	—	—	—	—	—
68	An Yong-hwan	안용환	New	Not	—	—	—	—	—	—	—	—	—	—	—	—
69	Chang Sok-ha	장석하	New	Not	—	—	—	—	—	—	—	—	—	—	—	—
70	Kim Pyong-sik	김평식	Old	Reelected	—	—	—	—	—	—	Member	—	—	—	—	—
71	So Kwan-hui	소관희	New	Reelected	—	—	—	—	—	—	—	—	—	—	—	—
72	Kim Song-yul	김송열	Old	Reelected	—	—	—	—	—	—	—	—	—	—	—	—
73	Sin Yong-sik	신용식	New	Reelected	—	—	—	—	—	—	—	—	—	—	—	—
74	Cho Chun-sam	조춘삼	New	Reelected	—	—	—	—	—	—	—	—	—	—	—	—
75	Kim Chwa-hyok	김채혁	Old	Not	—	—	Member	—	—	—	Member	—	—	—	—	—
76	Kim Song-yon	김송연	New	Not	—	—	—	—	—	—	—	—	—	—	—	—
77	Yi Chang-bok	이창복	Old	Not	—	—	—	—	—	—	—	—	—	—	—	—
78	Paek Chong-hup	백종섭	New	Not	—	—	—	—	—	—	—	—	—	—	—	—
79	Yu Chang-gwon	유창권	Old	Not	—	—	—	—	—	—	Alternate	—	—	—	—	—
80	Yi Sun-nam	이순남	New	Not	—	—	—	—	—	—	—	—	—	—	—	—
81	Kye Chun-yong	계춘용	New	Reelected	—	—	—	—	—	—	—	—	—	—	—	—
82	Han Tae-ryong	한태룡	New	Not	—	—	—	—	—	—	—	—	—	—	—	—
83	Pak Kwan-sun	박관선	New	Not	—	—	—	—	—	—	—	—	—	—	—	—
84	Chi Chang-gon	치창곤	Old	Not	—	—	—	—	—	—	—	—	—	—	—	—
85	Won Hong-gu	원홍구	Old	Not	—	—	—	—	—	—	—	—	—	—	—	—
86	Kim In-chol	김인철	New	Not	—	—	—	—	—	—	—	—	—	—	—	—
87	Yi Hyon-muk	이현묵	New	Not	—	—	—	—	—	—	—	—	—	—	—	—
88	Chong Pyong-gap	종평갑	Old	Not	—	—	—	—	—	—	Alternate	—	—	—	—	—
89	Mun Chong-suk	문종석	Old	Not	—	—	—	—	—	—	—	—	—	—	—	—
90	Han Tok-su	한독수	New	Reelected	—	—	—	—	—	—	—	—	—	—	—	—
91	O Hyon-ju	오현주	Old	Reelected	—	—	—	—	—	Member	Member	—	—	—	—	—
92	Kim Tong-yon	김통연	New	Not	—	—	—	—	—	—	—	—	—	—	—	—
93	Yim Yun-sik	임윤식	Old	Reelected	—	—	—	—	—	—	—	—	—	—	—	—
94	Kang Wi-jun	강위준	Old	Not	—	—	—	—	—	—	—	—	—	—	—	—
95	Yi Tu-chan	이투찬	New	Reelected	—	—	—	—	—	—	—	—	—	—	—	—
96	Chu To-il	추도일	Old	Reelected	—	—	—	—	—	—	—	—	—	—	—	—
97	Hwang Chung-op	황청업	Old	Not	—	—	—	—	—	—	—	—	—	—	—	—
98	Kim Pyong-sik	김평식	New	Not	—	—	—	—	—	—	—	—	—	—	—	—
99	Hwang Chae-son	황채손	Old	Reelected	—	—	—	—	—	—	—	—	—	—	—	—
100	Choe Chang-do	최창준	Old	Reelected	—	—	—	—	—	—	—	—	—	—	—	—
101	Kim Chang-jun	김창준	Old	Reelected	—	—	—	—	—	—	—	—	—	—	—	—
102	Kang Yang-uk	강양욱	Old	Reelected	—	V. Chair	—	—	—	—	—	—	—	—	—	—
103	Yi Pyong-sik	이평식	New	Not	—	—	—	—	—	—	—	—	—	—	—	—
104	Pak Ki-taek	박기택	New	Not	—	—	—	—	—	—	—	—	—	—	—	—
105	Song Kwan-jo	송관조	New	Reelected	—	—	—	—	—	—	—	—	—	—	—	—
106	Kim Tae-hyon	김태현	Old	Not	—	—	—	—	—	—	Alternate	—	—	—	—	—
107	Yi Sun-yong	이순용	Old	Not	—	—	—	—	—	—	—	—	—	—	—	—
108	Kim Yong-sik	김용식	New	Not	—	—	—	—	—	—	—	—	—	—	—	—
109	Kim Rak-hui	김낙희	Old	Reelected	—	—	—	Member	—	—	—	—	—	—	—	—
110	Choe Chun-sop	최춘섭	Old	Not	—	—	—	Member	—	—	—	—	—	—	—	—
111	Choe Kyong-hu	최경후	New	Not	—	—	—	—	—	—	—	—	—	—	—	—
112	Yi Chae-bok	이채복	Old	Not	—	—	—	—	—	—	—	—	—	—	—	—
113	Kim Won-jom	김원점	Old	Not	—	—	—	—	—	—	—	—	—	—	—	—
114	Hong Nae-gun	홍내군	New	Reelected	—	—	—	—	—	—	—	—	—	—	—	—
115	Yi Yong-suk	이용석	New	Reelected	—	—	—	—	—	—	—	—	—	—	—	—
116	Kim Sok-yong	김석용	Old	Reelected	—	—	—	—	Member	—	—	—	—	—	—	—
117	Pak Kwang-son	박광손	Old	Not	Procurement	—	—	—	—	—	—	—	—	—	—	—
118	Kim Kum-san	김금산	Old	Reelected	—	—	—	—	—	—	—	—	—	—	—	—
119	An Chang-se	안창세	New	Reelected	—	—	—	—	—	—	—	—	—	—	—	—
120	Chu Kil-sun	추길선	New	Reelected	—	—	—	—	—	—	—	—	—	—	—	—
121	Han Chan-ok	한찬옥	Old	Reelected	—	—	—	—	—	—	—	—	—	—	—	—
122	Chin Pyong-mu	진평무	Old	Reelected	—	—	—	—	—	—	—	—	—	—	—	—
123	Choe Rin-bom	최린봄	New	Not	—	—	—	—	—	—	—	—	—	—	—	—
124	Kim Kuk-hun	김국훈	Old	Reelected	—	—	Member	—	—	—	—	—	—	—	—	Member
125	Kim Pyong-han	김평한	New	Not	Metal	—	—	—	—	—	—	—	—	—	—	—
126	Cho Myong-hwa	조명화	Old	Not	—	—	—	—	—	—	—	—	—	—	—	—
127	Kim Tae-hong	김태홍	Old	Not	—	—	—	—	—	—	Member	—	—	—	—	—
128	Kim Yong-ho	김용호	New	Reelected	—	—	—	—	Member	—	—	—	—	—	—	—
129	Kim Pyong-bin	김평빈	New	Reelected	—	—	—	—	—	—	—	—	—	—	—	—
130	Yi Min-su	이민수	Old	Not	—	—	Member	—	—	—	—	—	—	—	Member	—
131	Kim Tae-gun	김태군	Old	Not	Power	—	—	—	—	—	Member	—	—	—	—	—
132	Pak Tong-gwan	박통관	Old	Reelected	—	—	—	—	—	—	—	—	—	—	—	—
133	O Tong-uk	오통욱	Old	Not	Academy	—	—	—	—	—	Member	—	—	—	—	—
134	Yi Chang-su	이창수	New	Not	Common	—	—	—	—	—	Member	—	—	—	—	—
135	Yi Kuk-kwon	이국권	New	Reelected	—	—	—	—	—	—	—	—	—	—	—	—
136	Choe Chang-yong	최창용	New	Not	—	—	—	—	—	—	—	—	—	—	—	—
137	Kim Chang-bok	김창복	New	Not	—	—	Member	—	—	—	—	—	—	—	—	—
138	Yi Yang-suk	이양숙	Old	Not	Textile	—	—	—	—	—	Alternate	—	—	—	—	—
139	Yi Yu-sop	이유	New	Not	—	—	—	—	—	—	—	—	—	—	—	—
140	Pak Kyong-suk	박경숙	Old	Not	—	—	—	—	—	—	—	—	—	—	—	—
141	Yi Yong-gu	이용구	New	Reelected	—	—	Member	—	—	—	—	—	—	—	—	—
142	Kang Chong-gun	강종군	New	Not	—	—	—	—	—	—	—	—	—	—	—	—
143	Choe Won-taek	최원택	Old	Not	—	—	—	—	—	—	Member	—	—	—	—	
144	Han Chong-gi	한종기	New	Reelected	—	—	—	Member	—	—	—	—	—	—	—	—
145	Yi Myon-sang	이면상	Old	Reelected	—	—	—	—	—	—	Alternate	—	—	—	—	—
146	Han Tae-suk	한태석	New	Not	—	—	—	—	—	—	—	—	—	—	—	—
147	Kim Tok-won	김톡원	New	Reelected	—	—	—	—	—	—	—	—	—	—	—	—
148	Sung So-il	성소일	New	Not	—	—	—	—	—	—	—	—	—	—	—	—
149	Kim Yo-jung	김요정	Old	Not	—	Member	Chairman	—	—	—	—	—	—	—	—	Chairman
150	Yi Man-gyu	이만규	Old	Not	—	—	—	—	—	—	—	—	—	—	—	—
151	Yun Pong-gu	윤퐁구	New	Not	—	—	—	—	—	—	—	—	—	—	—	—
152	An Yong	안용	Old	Not	—	—	—	—	—	—	Member	—	—	—	—	—
153	Chang Chong-hwan	장종환	Old	Reelected	—	—	—	—	—	—	—	—	—	—	—	—
154	Hong Si-hak	홍시학	Old	Reelected	—	—	—	—	—	—	—	—	—	—	—	—
155	Kim Kyong-myong	김경명	New	Reelected	—	—	—	—	—	—	—	—	—	—	—	—
156	Hong Yu-bok	홍유복	New	Not	—	—	—	—	—	—	—	—	—	—	—	—
157	Kim Kye-hyon	김계현	New	Not	—	—	—	—	—	—	—	—	—	—	—	—
158	Kim Myong-ok	김명옥	New	Not	—	—	—	—	—	—	—	—	—	—	—	—
159	An Sung-hak	안성학	Old	Not	Commerce	—	—	—	—	—	Alternate	—	—	—	—	—
160	Yi Chang-do	이창도	Old	Reelected	—	—	—	—	—	—	—	—	—	—	—	—
161	Yi Chun-bal	이춘발	New	Not	—	—	—	—	—	—	—	—	—	—	—	—
162	Tokko Mun-hung	톡코문흥	New	Not	—	—	—	—	—	—	—	—	—	—	—	—
163	Kim Sung-won	김성원	Old	Reelected	—	—	—	—	—	—	—	—	—	—	—	—
164	Yi Chun-sil	이춘실	New	Not	—	—	—	—	—	—	—	—	—	—	—	—
165	Kang Yong-suk	강용석	New	Reelected	—	—	—	—	—	—	—	—	—	—	—	—
166	Yu Kyong-ja	유경자	New	Not	—	—	—	—	—	—	—	—	—	—	—	—
167	Yi Pong-nyo	이퐁뇨	New	Not	—	—	—	—	—	—	—	—	—	—	—	—
168	Song Yong	송용	Old	Not	—	—	—	—	—	—	—	—	—	—	—	Member
169	Pak Mun-gyu	박문규	Old	Not	—	Secretary	—	—	—	—	Member	—	—	—	—	—
170	Yang In-gil	양인길	New	Reelected	—	—	—	—	—	—	—	—	—	—	—	—
171	Kim Pong-son	김퐁손	Old	Reelected	—	—	—	—	—	—	—	—	—	—	—	—
172	Kim Pyong-ik	김평식	Old	Not	—	—	—	—	—	—	—	—	—	—	—	—
173	Ko In-gol	고인골	Old	Not	—	—	—	—	—	—	—	—	—	—	—	—
174	Pak Sin-dok	박신독	Old	Reelected	—	Member	—	—	—	—	—	—	—	—	—	—
175	Cho Kwan-ha	조관하	New	Not	M Construction	—	—	—	—	—	—	—	—	—	—	—
176	Sok Chil-bo	속칠보	Old	Not	—	—	—	—	—	—	—	—	—	—	—	—
177	Kang U-sik	강우식	Old	Not	—	—	—	—	—	—	—	—	—	—	—	—
178	Chang Il-gyong	장일경	New	Reelected	—	—	—	—	—	—	—	—	—	—	—	—
179	Yi Kum-nyo	이금뇨	New	Reelected	—	—	—	—	—	—	—	—	—	—	—	—
180	Yom Chae-man	염채만	New	Not	—	—	—	—	—	—	—	—	—	—	—	—
181	Hwang Won-taek	황원택	Old	Not	—	—	—	—	—	—	—	—	—	—	—	—
182	Ko Kum-sun	고금선	Old	Reelected	—	—	—	—	—	—	—	—	—	—	—	—
183	Kim Tuk-nan	김턱난	Old	Reelected	—	—	—	—	—	—	—	—	—	—	—	—
184	Kim Kap-sun	김갑선	New	Not	Railways	—	—	—	—	—	—	—	—	—	—	—
185	Yang Chong-go	양종고	New	Reelected	—	—	—	—	—	—	—	—	—	—	—	—
186	Kim Sok-hyong	김석형	Old	Reelected	—	—	—	Member	—	—	—	—	—	—	—	—
187	Kim Yong-uk	김용욱	Old	Not	—	—	—	—	—	—	—	—	—	—	—	—
188	No Pyong-u	노평우	New	Not	Land	—	—	—	—	—	—	—	—	—	—	—
189	Yang Chae-il	양채일	New	Not	—	—	—	—	—	—	—	—	—	—	—	—
190	Kim Chae-hung	김채흥	New	Not	—	—	—	—	—	—	—	—	—	—	—	—
191	Nam Son-ok	남손옥	Old	Not	—	—	—	—	—	—	—	—	—	—	—	—
192	Kim Mu-hoe	김무회	Old	Not	—	—	—	—	—	—	—	—	—	—	—	—
193	Kim Chon-hwang	김천황	Old	Not	—	—	—	—	—	—	—	—	—	—	—	—
194	Kim Song-do	김송도	New	Not	—	—	—	—	—	—	—	—	—	—	—	—
195	Yu Rak-chong	유락총	Old	Reelected	—	—	—	—	—	—	—	—	—	—	—	—
196	Choe Kum-nyo	최금뇨	New	Not	—	—	—	—	—	—	—	—	—	—	—	—
197	Yu Chang-sik	유창식	New	Reelected	—	—	—	—	—	—	—	—	—	—	—	—
198	Kim Chae-un	김채은	Old	Not	—	—	—	—	—	—	—	—	—	—	—	—
199	Yang Taek-kon	양택곤	Old	Not	—	—	—	—	—	—	—	—	—	—	—	—
200	Yi Won-bom	이원봄	New	Not	—	—	—	Member	—	—	—	—	—	—	—	—
201	Kim Sok-man	김석만	Old	Not	—	—	—	—	—	—	—	—	—	—	—	—
202	Kim Won-chong	김원종	Old	Reelected	—	—	—	—	—	—	—	—	—	—	—	—
203	Yon Hyong-muk	연형묵	New	Reelected	—	—	—	—	—	—	—	—	—	—	—	—
204	Yang Ok-nyo	양옥뇨	New	Reelected	—	—	—	—	—	—	—	—	—	—	—	—
205	Yi Yong-son	이용손	Old	Reelected	—	—	—	—	—	—	—	—	—	—	—	—
206	Paek Kon-sa	백건사	New	Not	—	—	—	—	—	—	—	—	—	—	—	—
207	Han Chong-hon	한종혼	New	Not	—	—	—	—	—	—	—	—	—	—	—	—
208	Hong Won-gil	홍원길	New	Reelected	S Machine	—	—	—	—	—	Alternate	—	—	—	—	—
209	Paek Song-hak	백송학	Old	Not	—	—	—	—	—	—	—	—	—	—	—	—
210	Chon Hak-su	전학수	New	Not	—	—	—	—	—	—	—	—	—	—	—	—
211	Kim Yon-yo	김종요	New	Not	—	—	—	—	—	—	—	—	—	—	—	—
212	Pak Sung-il	박성일	New	Not	—	—	—	—	—	—	—	—	—	—	—	—
213	Kang Un-song	강운송	Old	Not	—	—	—	—	—	—	—	—	—	—	—	—
214	Han Chang-sun	한창선	Old	Not	—	—	—	—	—	—	—	—	—	—	—	—
215	Yi Sung-sun	이성선	Old	Not	—	—	—	—	—	—	—	—	—	—	—	—
216	Kim Chong-pil	김종필	New	Reelected	—	—	—	—	—	—	—	—	—	—	—	—
217	Pang Hyo-ul	팡효울	New	Not	—	—	—	—	—	—	—	—	—	—	—	—
218	Kim Won-sam	김원삼	Old	Reelected	—	—	—	—	—	—	—	—	—	—	—	—
219	Pak Yong-sok	박용석	New	Not	—	—	—	—	—	—	—	—	—	—	—	—
220	Kye Ung-tae	계웅태	New	Reelected	Trade	—	—	—	—	—	—	—	—	—	—	—
221	An Sung-bae	안성배	New	Not	—	—	—	—	—	—	—	—	—	—	—	—
222	O Kyong-ae	오경해	Old	Not	—	—	—	—	—	—	—	—	—	—	—	—
223	Kang Po-gum	강포검	New	Not	—	—	—	—	—	—	—	—	—	—	—	—
224	Yim Chin-gyu	임진규	Old	Not	—	—	—	—	—	—	Member	—	—	—	—	—
225	Pak Yong-sop	박용섭	New	Reelected	—	—	—	—	—	—	—	—	—	—	—	—
226	Chang Sam-son	장삼손	New	Not	—	—	—	—	—	—	—	—	—	—	—	—
227	Kim Son-mo	김선모	New	Not	—	—	—	—	—	—	—	—	—	—	—	—
228	Yi Chun-hwi	이춘휘	New	Not	—	—	—	—	—	—	—	—	—	—	—	—
229	Mun Song-sul	문송술	Old	Not	—	—	—	—	—	—	—	—	—	—	—	—
230	Yi Kye-hwan	이계환	New	Reelected	—	—	—	—	—	—	—	—	—	—	—	—
231	Han Su-hyon	한수현	Old	Not	—	—	—	—	—	—	—	—	—	—	—	—
232	Kim Ung-sang	김웅상	Old	Reelected	Scientific	—	—	—	—	—	Alternate	—	—	—	—	—
233	Cho Yong-pil	조용필	New	Not	—	—	—	—	—	—	—	—	—	—	—	—
234	Chon Pyong-gun	전평군	New	Not	—	—	—	—	—	—	—	—	—	—	—	—
235	Choe Pong-san	최봉산	Old	Not	—	—	—	—	—	—	—	—	—	—	—	—
236	An Suk-yong	안석용	Old	Reelected	—	—	—	—	—	—	—	—	—	—	—	—
237	Chong Il-yong	종일용	New	Not	Building	—	—	—	—	—	Member	—	—	—	—	—
238	Kim Un-hak	김운학	New	Not	—	—	—	—	—	—	—	—	—	—	—	—
239	Kim Chin-hwa	김진화	Old	Not	—	—	—	—	—	—	—	—	—	—	—	—
240	Yi Im-su	이임수	New	Not	—	—	—	—	—	—	—	—	—	—	—	—
241	Kim Yong-bom	김용범	New	Not	—	—	—	—	—	—	—	—	—	—	—	—
242	Cho Yong-mu	조용무	New	Not	—	—	—	—	—	—	—	—	—	—	—	—
243	Yi Tong-jun	이통준	New	Reelected	—	—	—	—	—	—	—	—	—	—	—	—
244	Yi Chong-guk	이종국	New	Not	—	—	—	Member	—	—	—	—	—	—	—	—
245	U Yong-sul	유용술	New	Not	—	—	—	—	—	—	—	—	—	—	—	—
246	Kim Tu-sam	김투삼	New	Not	C Construction	—	—	—	—	—	—	—	—	—	—	—
247	Yi Il-ung	이일웅	New	Not	—	—	—	—	—	—	—	—	—	—	—	—
248	Yi Su-il	이수일	New	Not	—	—	—	—	—	—	—	—	—	—	—	—
249	Kim Nam-gyo	김남교	New	Not	—	—	—	—	—	—	—	—	—	—	—	—
250	Kim Sang-guk	김상국	Old	Not	—	—	—	—	—	—	—	—	—	—	—	—
251	Kim Pong-chun	김퐁천	New	Not	—	—	—	—	—	—	—	—	—	—	—	—
252	Chon Chang-chol	전창철	Old	Reelected	—	—	—	—	—	Member	Member	—	—	—	—	—
253	Cho Chang-suk	조창숙	New	Reelected	—	—	—	—	—	—	—	—	—	—	—	—
254	Chong Chi-ryong	종치룡	New	Reelected	—	—	—	—	—	—	—	—	—	—	—	—
255	Kim Hung-il	김정일	Old	Not	—	—	—	—	—	—	—	—	—	—	—	—
256	Han Ki-chang	한기창	Old	Not	—	—	—	—	—	—	—	—	—	—	—	—
257	Yi Pyong-bu	이평부	Old	Not	—	—	—	—	—	—	—	—	—	—	—	—
258	Han ik-su	한익수	Old	Reelected	—	—	—	—	—	—	Member	—	—	—	—	—
259	Choe Kum-san	최금산	New	Reelected	—	—	—	—	—	—	—	—	—	—	—	—
260	Yi Kwang-sil	이광실	Old	Not	—	—	—	—	—	—	Member	—	—	—	—	—
261	Pak Chong-hyon	박종현	New	Reelected	—	—	—	—	—	—	—	—	—	—	—	—
262	Choe Sa-hyon	최사현	New	Not	—	—	—	—	—	—	—	—	—	—	—	—
263	Song Pok-ki	송폭기	New	Reelected	Chemical	—	—	—	—	—	Alternate	—	—	—	—	—
264	Yi Kuk-no	이국노	Old	Not	—	—	—	—	—	—	—	—	—	—	—	—
265	Pang Hak-se	팡학세	New	Reelected	—	—	—	—	—	—	—	—	—	—	—	—
266	Kim Chae-bong	김채봉	New	Not	—	—	—	—	—	—	—	—	—	—	—	—
267	Chong Kwang-nok	종광녹	Old	Not	—	—	—	—	—	—	—	—	—	—	—	—
268	Kim Hoe-il	김회일	Old	Not	—	—	—	—	—	—	Member	—	—	—	—	—
269	Chu In-gon	추인곤	New	Not	—	—	—	—	—	—	—	—	—	—	—	—
270	Hwang Hwa-bok	황화복	Old	Not	—	—	—	—	—	—	—	—	—	—	—	—
271	Yi Ki-chol	이기철	Old	Not	—	—	—	—	—	—	—	—	—	—	—	—
272	Choe Chung-won	최청원	New	Reelected	—	—	—	—	—	—	—	—	—	—	—	—
273	Kim Nung-il	김정일	New	Not	—	—	—	—	—	—	—	—	—	—	—	—
274	Cho Chung-won	조청원	New	Not	—	—	—	—	—	—	—	—	—	—	—	—
275	Chong Ki-su	종기수	New	Not	—	—	—	—	—	—	—	—	—	—	—	—
276	Chon Han-gyo	전한교	New	Reelected	—	—	—	—	—	—	—	—	—	—	—	—
277	Sung Chang-yul	성창열	New	Not	—	—	—	—	—	—	—	—	—	—	—	—
278	Kang Cho-sun	강조선	Old	Not	—	—	—	—	—	—	—	—	—	—	—	—
279	Choe Chil-gap	최칠갑	Old	Reelected	—	—	—	—	—	—	—	—	—	—	—	—
280	Ko Min-sun	고민선	Old	Reelected	—	—	—	—	—	—	—	—	—	—	—	—
281	Yi Su-chon	이수촌	New	Not	—	—	—	—	—	—	—	—	—	—	—	—
282	Chang Sang-yong	장상용	New	Not	—	—	—	—	—	—	—	—	—	—	—	—
283	Yi Sun-ho	이순호	New	Reelected	—	—	—	—	—	—	—	—	—	—	—	—
284	Ko Chun-taek	고춘택	Old	Not	—	—	—	—	—	—	—	—	—	—	—	—
285	Pak Yong-sun	박용선	Old	Reelected	Communications	—	—	—	—	—	Member	—	—	—	—	—
286	Chong Tong-chol	종통철	Old	Not	Forestry	—	—	—	—	—	—	—	—	—	—	Member
287	Yi Yon	이연	Old	Reelected	—	—	—	—	—	—	—	—	—	—	—	—
288	Yi Kye-baek	이계백	New	Reelected	—	—	—	—	—	—	—	—	—	—	—	—
289	Paek Nam-un	백남은	Old	Reelected	—	—	—	—	—	—	Member	—	—	—	—	—
290	Ri Sung-gi	이성기	New	Reelected	—	—	Member	—	—	—	—	—	—	—	—	—
291	Kwon Yun-il	권윤일	Old	Reelected	—	—	—	—	—	—	—	—	—	—	—	—
292	Kang Chom-gu	강첨구	New	Not	Fisheries	—	—	—	—	—	—	—	—	—	—	—
293	Choe Sang-ul	최상울	Old	Not	—	—	—	—	—	—	—	—	—	—	—	—
294	Kang Maeng-gu	강맹구	New	Reelected	—	—	—	—	—	—	—	—	—	—	—	—
295	Hyon Chang-yong	현창용	Old	Not	—	—	—	—	—	—	—	—	—	—	—	—
296	Pak Hong-gol	박홍골	Old	Not	—	—	—	—	—	—	—	—	—	—	—	—
297	Han Hyong-wan	한형완	New	Reelected	—	—	—	—	—	—	—	—	—	—	—	—
298	Kim Song-gu	김송구	New	Not	—	—	—	—	—	—	—	—	—	—	—	—
299	Chong Hui-chol	종희철	New	Reelected	—	—	—	—	—	—	—	—	—	—	—	—
300	Pak Pong-jo	박퐁조	Old	Not	—	—	—	—	—	—	—	—	—	—	—	—
301	Chon Cha-ryon	전차련	Old	Reelected	—	—	—	—	—	—	—	—	—	—	—	—
302	Yun Yon-hwan	윤연환	Old	Not	—	—	—	Member	—	—	—	—	—	—	—	—
303	Kim Mun-gun	김문군	Old	Not	—	—	—	—	—	—	—	—	—	—	—	—
304	Pak Pok-sun	박폭선	New	Not	—	—	—	—	—	—	—	—	—	—	—	—
305	Sin Po-gyun	신포균	New	Reelected	—	—	—	—	—	—	—	—	—	—	—	—
306	Kim Yang-chun	김양천	Old	Not	—	—	—	—	—	—	—	—	—	—	—	—
307	Yi Hak-pin	이학핀	Old	Not	—	—	—	—	—	—	—	—	—	—	—	—
308	Choe Min-hwan	최민환	Old	Not	—	—	—	—	—	—	—	—	—	—	—	—
309	Chu Song-il	추송일	Old	Reelected	—	—	—	—	—	—	—	—	—	—	—	—
310	Chu Tu-byok	추투벽	New	Not	—	—	—	—	—	—	—	—	—	—	—	—
311	Kim Yong-taek	김용택	New	Reelected	—	—	—	—	—	—	—	—	—	—	—	—
312	Yi Chae-yun	이채윤	Old	Reelected	—	—	—	—	—	—	Member	—	—	—	—	—
313	Yi Yun-do	이윤도	New	Not	—	—	—	—	—	Member	—	—	—	—	—	—
314	An Chang-hwa	안창화	New	Not	—	—	—	—	—	—	—	—	—	—	—	—
315	Ham Sok-chun	함석천	New	Not	—	—	—	—	—	—	—	—	—	—	—	—
316	Ri Ki-yong	리기용	Old	Reelected	—	—	—	—	—	—	—	—	—	—	—	—
317	Han Myong-suk	한명석	New	Not	—	—	—	—	—	—	—	—	—	—	—	—
318	Han Hubang-nyo	하누방뇨	Old	Reelected	—	—	—	—	—	—	—	—	—	—	—	—
319	Yo Kyong-gu	요경구	Old	Not	—	—	—	—	—	—	—	—	—	—	—	—
320	Kim Oin-nam	김오인남	New	Reelected	—	—	—	—	—	—	—	—	—	—	—	—
321	Chong Chong-gi	종종기	Old	Not	—	—	—	—	—	—	—	—	—	—	—	—
322	Chon Chae-su	전채수	New	Not	—	—	—	—	—	—	—	—	—	—	—	—
323	Mun Suk-cha	문석차	New	Reelected	—	—	—	—	—	—	—	—	—	—	—	—
324	Yi Chong-san	이종산	New	Not	—	—	—	—	—	—	—	—	—	—	—	—
325	Pak Chan-je	박찬제	Old	Not	—	—	—	—	—	—	—	—	—	—	—	—
326	O Kuk-yol	오국열	New	Reelected	—	—	—	—	—	—	—	—	—	—	—	—
327	Yi Chol-u	이철우	New	Not	—	—	—	—	—	—	—	—	—	—	—	—
328	Choe Tae-yon	최태연	New	Not	—	—	—	—	—	—	—	—	—	—	—	—
329	Kwon Yong-u	권용우	Old	Reelected	—	—	—	—	—	—	—	—	—	—	—	—
330	Chong Tu-hwan	종투환	Old	Reelected	—	—	—	—	—	—	Member	—	—	—	—	—
331	Chin Yong-dong	진용동	New	Not	—	—	—	—	—	—	—	—	—	—	—	—
332	Kim Won-chan	김원찬	New	Reelected	—	—	—	—	—	—	—	—	—	—	—	—
333	Mun Suk-cha	문석차	New	Not	—	—	—	—	—	—	—	—	—	—	—	—
334	Chong Ki-man	종기만	Old	Not	—	—	—	—	—	—	—	—	—	—	—	—
335	Choe Chang-son	최창손	New	Not	—	—	—	—	—	—	—	—	—	—	—	—
336	Choe Chung-son	최청손	Old	Reelected	—	—	—	—	—	—	—	—	—	—	—	—
337	Cho Kyong-suk	조경석	New	Not	—	—	—	—	—	—	—	—	—	—	—	—
338	Sin Sung-o	신성오	New	Not	—	—	—	—	—	—	—	—	—	—	—	—
339	Yi Rak-bin	이락빈	New	Reelected	—	—	—	—	—	—	—	—	—	—	—	—
340	Kim Ok-sun	김옥선	Old	Reelected	—	—	—	—	—	Member	—	—	—	—	—	—
341	Kwon Chom-du	권첨두	New	Reelected	—	—	—	—	—	—	—	—	—	—	—	—
342	Pak Sung-hak	박성학	Old	Not	—	—	—	—	—	—	—	—	—	—	—	—
343	Yi Yong-gu	이용구	Old	Not	—	—	—	—	—	—	—	—	—	—	—	—
344	Yi Man-ik	이만익	Old	Not	—	—	—	—	—	—	—	—	—	—	—	—
345	Choe Song-jip	최송집	Old	Not	—	—	—	—	—	—	—	—	—	—	—	—
346	Choe Chung-guk	최청국	New	Reelected	—	—	—	—	—	Member	—	—	—	—	—	—
347	Yi Su-dok	이수독	New	Not	—	—	—	—	—	—	—	—	—	—	—	—
348	Kim U-jin	김우진	New	Not	—	—	—	—	—	—	—	—	—	—	—	—
349	Kim Yong-yon	김용연	New	Not	—	—	—	—	—	—	—	—	—	—	—	—
350	Yi Yong-gi	이용기	New	Not	—	—	—	—	—	—	—	—	—	—	—	—
351	Kim Chol-man	김철만	Old	Reelected	—	—	—	—	—	—	—	—	—	—	—	—
352	Kim Kyu-sun	김규선	New	Reelected	—	—	—	—	—	—	—	—	—	—	—	—
353	Choe Min-chol	최민철	New	Not	—	—	—	—	—	—	Member	—	—	—	—	—
354	Yi Mae-chun	이매춘	Old	Not	—	—	—	—	—	—	—	—	—	—	—	—
355	So Chol	서철	Old	Reelected	—	—	—	—	—	Chairman	Member	—	—	—	—	—
356	Kang Tok-yo	강톡요	Old	Not	—	—	—	—	—	—	—	—	—	—	—	—
357	Chon Mun-uk	전문욱	New	Not	—	—	—	—	—	—	—	—	—	—	—	—
358	Hong To-hak	홍토학	Old	Not	—	—	—	—	—	—	—	—	—	—	—	—
359	O Paek-yong	오백용	Old	Reelected	—	—	—	—	—	—	Member	—	—	—	—	—
360	Yang Chun-hyok	양춘혁	Old	Not	—	—	—	—	—	—	—	—	—	—	—	—
361	O Tae-bong	오태봉	Old	Reelected	5 Secretariat	—	—	—	—	—	Alternate	—	—	—	—	—
362	Kim Cha-rin	김차린	New	Not	—	—	—	—	—	—	—	—	—	—	—	Member
363	Yi Kye-san	이계산	Old	Reelected	—	—	—	—	Member	—	—	—	—	—	—	—
364	Ri Ul-sol	리을솔	Old	Reelected	—	—	—	—	—	—	—	—	—	—	—	—
365	O Che-ryong	오체룡	Old	Not	—	—	—	Member	—	—	Member	—	—	—	—	—
366	Paek Son-il	백선일	Old	Not	Labour	—	—	—	—	—	Alternate	—	—	—	—	—
367	Song Ok-man	송옥만	New	Not	—	—	—	—	—	—	—	—	—	—	—	—
368	Kim Chong-hwa	김종화	New	Not	—	—	—	—	—	—	—	—	—	—	—	—
369	Yu Pyong-yon	유평연	Old	Not	—	—	—	—	—	—	—	—	—	—	—	—
370	Yi Song-nam	이송남	Old	Not	—	—	—	—	—	—	—	—	—	—	—	—
371	Kim Kum-sil	김금실	Old	Not	—	—	—	—	—	—	—	—	—	—	—	—
372	Kim Yun-sik	김윤식	New	Not	—	—	—	—	—	—	—	—	—	—	—	—
373	O Ki-chon	오기촌	New	Not	—	—	—	—	—	Member	—	—	—	—	—	—
374	Chu In-hwa	추인화	New	Not	—	—	—	—	—	—	—	—	—	—	—	—
375	Sim Hyong-sik	심형식	Old	Not	—	—	—	—	—	—	—	—	—	—	—	—
376	Pak Yong-su	박용수	Old	Reelected	—	—	—	—	—	—	—	—	—	—	—	—
377	Kang Hyon-su	강현수	New	Not	—	—	—	—	—	—	—	—	—	—	—	—
378	Yi Chan-hwa	이찬화	Old	Reelected	—	—	—	—	—	—	—	—	—	—	—	—
379	Choe Man-guk	최만국	Old	Reelected	—	—	—	—	—	—	—	—	—	—	—	—
380	Yi Tal-yong	이탈용	New	Reelected	—	—	—	—	Member	—	—	—	—	—	—	—
381	Yi Sok-nam	이석남	Old	Not	—	—	—	—	—	—	—	—	—	—	—	—
382	Kim Tae-hwa	김태화	New	Not	—	—	—	—	—	—	—	—	—	—	—	—
383	Chu Chong-myong	추종명	Old	Not	—	—	—	—	—	—	—	—	—	—	—	—
384	Kim Won-bin	김원빈	Old	Not	—	—	—	—	—	—	—	—	—	—	—	—
385	Yim Kwi-bin	임귀빈	Old	Not	—	—	—	—	—	—	—	—	—	—	—	—
386	Choe Sun-nam	최선남	Old	Reelected	—	—	—	—	—	—	—	—	—	—	—	—
387	Yi Tu-ik	이투익	Old	Reelected	—	—	—	—	—	—	—	—	—	—	—	—
388	Chu Sang-su	추상수	Old	Reelected	—	—	—	—	—	—	—	—	—	—	—	—
389	No Su-ok	노숙옥	Old	Not	—	—	—	—	—	—	Member	—	—	—	—	—
390	Yom Tae-jun	염태준	Old	Reelected	—	—	Member	—	—	—	Alternate	—	—	—	—	—
391	Yi Pang-gun	이팡군	New	Reelected	—	—	—	—	—	—	—	—	—	—	—	—
392	O Sun-nyo	오순뇨	New	Reelected	—	—	—	—	—	—	—	—	—	—	—	—
393	Sung Sin-bom	성신봄	Old	Not	—	—	—	—	—	—	—	—	—	—	—	—
394	Kim Chan-gwon	김찬권	New	Not	—	—	—	—	—	—	—	—	—	—	—	—
395	Kim Pong-yul	김퐁열	Old	Reelected	—	—	—	—	—	—	—	—	—	—	—	—
396	Choe Chae-u	최채우	Old	Reelected	1 Secretariat	—	—	—	—	—	Alternate	—	—	—	—	—
397	Chon Son-bi	전손비	New	Not	—	—	—	—	—	—	—	—	—	—	—	—
398	Pak Yong-sin	박용신	Old	Not	Culture	—	—	—	—	—	—	—	—	—	—	—
399	Kim Tong-hwan	김통환	New	Reelected	—	—	—	—	—	—	—	—	—	—	—	—
400	Kim Pong-su	김퐁수	New	Not	—	—	—	—	—	—	—	—	—	—	—	—
401	Kim Chung-yo	김정요	New	Not	—	—	—	—	—	—	—	—	—	—	—	—
402	Cha Sok-ho	차속호	New	Not	—	—	—	—	—	—	—	—	—	—	—	—
403	Kang Uk-kuk	강욱국	Old	Reelected	—	—	—	—	—	—	—	—	—	—	—	—
404	Jon Mun-sop	전문섭	Old	Reelected	—	—	—	—	—	—	Member	—	—	—	—	—
405	Yi Chin-gyu	이친규	New	Reelected	—	—	—	—	—	—	—	—	—	—	—	—
406	Yim Sun-nyo	임순뇨	Old	Reelected	—	—	—	—	—	—	—	—	—	—	—	—
407	Chon Yong-sun	전용선	New	Not	—	—	—	—	—	—	—	—	—	—	—	—
408	Yu Man-ok	유만옥	Old	Not	—	—	—	—	—	—	—	—	—	—	—	—
409	Yi Chang-jun	이창준	Old	Not	—	—	—	—	—	—	—	—	—	—	—	—
410	Chon Man-yong	전만용	Old	Not	—	—	—	—	—	—	—	—	—	—	—	—
411	Kim Kuk-thae	김국태	New	Not	—	—	—	—	—	—	—	—	—	—	—	—
412	O Taek-hwan	오택환	New	Reelected	—	—	—	—	—	—	—	—	—	—	—	—
413	Tae Pyong-yol	태평열	Old	Reelected	—	—	—	—	—	—	Alternate	—	—	—	—	—
414	Chong Wol-san	종월산	Old	Not	—	—	—	—	—	—	—	—	—	—	—	—
415	Yim Hyong-gu	임형구	New	Not	—	—	—	—	Member	—	—	—	—	—	—	—
416	Yang Hyong-sop	양형섭	Old	Reelected	Higher	—	—	—	—	—	Member	—	—	Member	—	—
417	Ri Kun-mo	리건모	New	Reelected	—	—	—	—	—	—	—	—	—	—	—	—
418	U Sang-bok	우상복	New	Not	—	—	—	—	—	—	—	—	—	—	—	—
419	Yi Pok-hyong	이폭형	New	Not	—	—	—	—	—	—	—	—	—	—	—	—
420	Yi Ho-hyok	이호혁	New	Not	Foodstuff	—	—	—	—	—	—	—	—	—	—	—
421	Kim Chi-do	김치도	New	Not	Mining	—	—	—	—	—	—	—	—	—	—	—
422	Pak Pyong-guk	박평국	Old	Not	—	—	—	—	—	—	—	—	—	—	—	—
423	Yi Kun-song	이건송	Old	Reelected	—	—	—	—	—	—	—	—	—	—	—	—
424	O Chae-won	오채원	New	Not	—	—	—	—	—	—	—	—	—	—	—	—
425	O Pyong-dok	오평독	New	Reelected	—	—	—	—	—	—	—	—	—	—	—	—
426	Sin Su-gyong	신수경	New	Not	—	—	—	—	—	—	—	—	—	—	—	—
427	Yim Tae-sop	임태섭	New	Not	—	—	—	—	—	—	—	—	—	—	—	—
428	Yang Chong-tae	양종태	Old	Not	—	—	—	—	—	—	—	—	—	—	—	—
429	Chong In-son	종인손	Old	Not	—	—	—	—	—	—	—	—	—	—	—	—
430	An Tal-su	안탈수	Old	Reelected	—	—	—	—	—	—	—	—	—	—	—	—
431	Han Yang-du	한양두	New	Not	—	—	—	—	—	—	—	—	—	—	—	—
432	Kim Son-uk	김선욱	New	Reelected	—	—	—	—	—	—	—	—	—	—	—	—
433	Kim Chung-nin	김충닌	Old	Reelected	—	—	—	—	—	—	Member	—	—	Member	—	—
434	Cho Sun-ok	조선옥	New	Not	—	—	—	—	—	—	—	—	—	—	—	—
435	Ku Cha-hun	구차훈	New	Reelected	—	—	—	—	—	—	—	—	—	—	—	—
436	Yi Mun-ja	이문자	New	Not	—	—	—	—	—	—	—	—	—	—	—	—
437	Kim Sun-bok	김선복	New	Not	—	—	—	—	—	—	—	—	—	—	—	—
438	Hwang Ki-so	황기소	New	Not	—	—	—	—	—	—	—	—	—	—	—	—
439	Yim Kye-chol	임계철	Old	Not	—	—	—	Chairman	—	—	Member	—	—	—	—	—
440	Yi Chan-son	이찬손	Old	Not	—	—	—	—	—	—	—	—	—	—	—	—
441	Paek Hak-nim	백학님	New	Reelected	—	—	—	—	—	—	Alternate	—	—	—	—	—
442	Kim Ki-son	김기손	Old	Not	—	—	—	—	—	—	—	—	—	—	—	—
443	Hwang Won-nam	황원남	Old	Reelected	—	—	—	—	—	—	—	—	—	—	—	—
444	Yi Chong-nim	이종님	New	Not	—	—	—	—	—	—	—	—	—	—	—	—
445	Yun Tae-hong	윤태홍	New	Not	—	—	—	—	—	—	—	—	—	—	—	V. Chair
446	Choe Ok-chun	최옥천	Old	Not	—	—	—	—	—	—	—	—	—	—	—	—
447	Chon Pil-yo	전필요	New	Reelected	—	—	—	—	—	—	—	—	—	—	—	—
448	Chang Yun-pil	장윤필	Old	Reelected	—	—	—	Member	—	—	Alternate	—	—	—	—	—
449	Choe Kyu-hwan	최규환	New	Not	—	—	—	—	—	—	—	—	—	—	—	—
450	Kim Ui-hwan	김의환	Old	Not	—	—	—	—	—	—	—	—	—	—	—	—
451	Chon No-hyong	전노형	New	Reelected	—	—	—	—	—	—	—	—	—	—	—	—
452	Yi Yong-sun	이용선	Old	Reelected	—	—	—	—	—	—	Alternate	—	—	—	—	—
453	Yim Chol	임철	New	Reelected	—	—	—	—	—	—	Member	—	—	—	—	—
454	Yun Hyong-sik	윤형식	Old	Not	—	—	—	—	—	—	—	—	—	—	—	—
455	Chin Mun-dok	친문독	New	Reelected	—	—	—	—	—	—	—	—	—	—	—	—
456	Yi Chang-sun	이창순	Old	Reelected	—	—	—	—	—	—	—	—	—	—	—	—
457	Kim Man-gum	김만검	Old	Reelected	Agriculture	—	—	—	—	—	Member	—	—	—	—	—
