= 1962 North Korean parliamentary election =

- 8 October 1962

All 383 seats in the Supreme People's Assembly
- Turnout: 100%
Party	Seats	+/–
Workers' Party of Korea	371	+193
Korean Democratic Party	4	−7
Chondoist Chongu Party	4	−7
This lists parties that won seats. See the complete results below.
Premier before	Premier after
Kim Il Sung; Workers' Party	Kim Il Sung; Workers' Party

Parliamentary elections were held in North Korea on 8 October 1962 to elect the members of the 3rd Supreme People's Assembly. Only one candidate was presented in each constituency, all of which were selected by the Workers' Party of Korea, although some ran under the banner of other parties or state organisations to give the illusion of democracy. Voter turnout was reported to be 100%, with all reportedly voting in favour of the candidates presented.

== Symbolic significance of the leader's seat ==
The Kangson constituency, where Kim Il Sung applied to be a candidate of, was the area that started the Chollima movement and thus had symbolic weight in North Korean political discourse.

== Results ==
Party or alliance		Votes	%	Seats
Fatherland Front	Workers' Party of Korea			371
Fatherland Front	Chondoist Chongu Party			4
Fatherland Front	Korean Democratic Party			4
Fatherland Front	Laboring People's Party			1
Fatherland Front	Buddhist Alliance			1
Fatherland Front	Gonmin People's Alliance			1
Fatherland Front	Democratic Independent Party			1
Total				383
Registered voters/turnout			100	
Source: Nohlen et al.

== Elected members ==
The following were elected as members of parliament:

1. Kim Il Sung
2. Choe Yong-gon
3. Kim Il
4. Hong Myong-hui
5. Pak Kum-chol
6. Kim Chang-man
7. Yi Hyo-sun
8. Kim Kwang-hyop
9. Jong Il-ryong
10. Nam Il
11. Yi Chong-ok
12. Pak Chong-ae
13. Yi Chu-yon
14. Kim Ik-son
15. Ha Ang-chon
16. Han Sang-du
17. Chong Chun-taek
18. Hyon Mu-gwang
19. Kang Hui-won
20. Ho Pong-hak
21. Yom Kyong-jae
22. Sin Chung-sun
23. Kim Kuk-hun
24. Choe Chang-sok
25. Choe Un-hak
26. Yi Song-un
27. Pak Se-chang
28. Pak Kyong-suk
29. Kang Yang-uk
30. Kim Pyong-sik
31. Song Tok-hun
32. Yi Chong-suk
33. Tae Pyong-yol
34. Yi Chang-do
35. Yi Ung-won
36. Yi Chae-bok
37. Yun Pyong-gwon
38. Paek Ui-myong
39. Kim Won-bin
40. Chon Kyong-hwa
41. Kim Su-bok
42. Choe Sang-hwa
43. Ko Hyok
44. Kim Tae-hyon
45. Hwang Sun-hui
46. Choe Kwang
47. Kim Chang-bong
48. Kim Chong-hang
49. Kwon Yong-tae
50. Kim Ung-sang
51. Chon Chang-chol
52. Pak Kum-ok
53. Kim Tong-gyu
54. O Tong-uk
55. Kim Song-yul
56. Yang Chong-tae
57. Pak Song-guk
58. Han Tong-baek
59. Pak Sin-dok
60. To Yu-ho
61. Song Yong
62. Kim Won-jom
63. Hwang Chae-son
64. Chi Chang-gon
65. O Rye-son
66. Kang Wi-jun
67. Choe Hyon
68. Kim Sang-hwan
69. Kim Won-jon
70. Ko Chong-ik
71. Mun Chong-suk
72. Yim Yun-sik
73. Kim Kum-san
74. Chong Pyong-gap
75. Yu Ki-ik
76. O Tae-bong
77. Yi Man-gyu
78. Ko Chun-taek
79. Yom Tae-jun
80. Pak Kwang-son
81. No Ik-myong
82. Hwang Chung-op
83. Pak Yong-guk
84. Kim Chang-jun
85. Choe Chang-do
86. An Chae-sung
87. Kim Man-gum
88. Yi Yong-ho
89. Kim Pyong-su
90. Kang Chun-guk
91. Pak Yong-sun
92. Choe Chun-sop
93. Han Chan-ok
94. Kim Nak-hui
95. Kim Hyon-su
96. Kim Yong-ju
97. Cho Myong-hwa
98. Son Won-dong
99. Yi Chong-sam
100. Yi Chang-bok
101. An Suk-yong
102. Yi Min-su
103. Cho Ung-sop
104. Chong Tu-hwan
105. Chin Pyong-mu
106. Kim Kwan-sop
107. Yi Tae-u
108. Pak Song-chol
109. Kang Chung-yon
110. Choe Tae-son
111. Pak Tong-gwan
112. Chi Myong-gwan
113. Choe Ki-won
114. Yi Il-gyong
115. Yi Tok-hyon
116. Hyon Chang-yong
117. Kim Sok-yong
118. Paek Son-il
119. O Paek-ryong
120. Kim Tuk-nan
121. Yi Tan
122. Kim Chun-song
123. Sok San
124. Yi Chun-yong
125. Ko Kim-sun
126. Kim Yang-yul
127. Kim Sok-hyong
128. Han Tae-yong
129. Han Ik-su
130. Chong Chi-hwan
131. Kye Ung-sang
132. Yi Chan-son
133. Kim Yong-ho
134. So Chol
135. Yi Won-jun
136. Yim Pong-on
137. No Yong-se
138. Kim Tok-bok
139. Ko In-gol
140. Kim Sung-won
141. Yim Kye-chol
142. Yu Myong-ho
143. Kim Myong-gyong
144. Kim Tae-ryon
145. Sok Chil-bo
146. Kim Pong-son
147. Kim Song-chol
148. Kang U-sik
149. Kang Chung-han
150. Kang Ho-sin
151. Hwang Won-taek
152. Han Yong-ok
153. Yim Yong-gyun
154. Chang Myong-jun
155. Kim Yong-uk
156. Won Hong-gu
157. Kim Mu-hoe
158. Kim Chae-un
159. Kim Chon-hwang
160. Yu Rak-chong
161. Choe Chang-gol
162. Yang Taek-kon
163. Nam Son-ok
164. So Ul-hyon
165. Kim Sok-man
166. Kang Un-song
167. Yu Kon-yang
168. Yi Yong-son
169. Yon Pok-kil
170. Cho Tong-sop
171. Kim Chung-nin
172. Kim Won-chong
173. Kim Tong-sik
174. Song Chang-nyom
175. Kim Pyong-mo
176. Kim Tal-chun
177. Han Sung-un
178. Yu Yong-sop
179. Chang Kyong-sun
180. Kim Wa-ryong
181. O Kyong-ae
182. Kim Ok-chun
183. Han Sang-sun
184. Kim Won-sol
185. Kim Won-sam
186. Yim Chin-gyu
187. Paek Song-hak
188. Kim Pyong-sun
189. Chong Tong-chol
190. Choe Song-nak
191. Kim Won-hyong
192. Chang Chong-taek
193. Han Su-hyon
194. Pak Chong-yol
195. Choe Pong-sun
196. Mun Chang-sok
197. Paek Song-guk
198. Choe Pong-san
199. Kim Chin-hwa
200. Chu Won-saeng
201. Ho Pil-su
202. Yang Pok-won
203. Kim Se-bong
204. Kim Ok-sun
205. Kim Hak-sun
206. Yi Chae-gun
207. Choe Chung-sok
208. Kim Hung-il
209. Kim Sang-guk
210. Hong Si-hak
211. Hwang Hwa-bok
212. Kim Tong-hyok
213. Yi Pyong-bu
214. Yu Chang-gwon
215. Yang Tae-gun
216. Han Ki-chang
217. Chong Kwang-nok
218. Mun Song-sul
219. Kim Wal-yong
220. Yi Yang-suk
221. Yi Kwang-son
222. Pak Yong-song
223. Choe Ki-chol
224. To Chong-ho
225. Yi Ki-chol
226. Yang Chung-gyom
227. Choe Chung-san
228. Kang Cho-sun
229. Yi Sang-un
230. Ko Min-sun
231. Choe Chil-gap
232. Yi Song-yon
233. Yun Ki-bok
234. Yi Pong-nam
235. Kim Hoe-il
236. Kang Yong-chang
237. Yi Kuk-chin
238. Yun Yon-hwan
239. Yi Yon
240. Yim Chun-chu
241. Yi Yong-gu
242. Choe Yong-jin
243. Kwon Yun-il
244. Choe Sang-ul
245. Yang Hyong-sop
246. Pak Hong-sun
247. Pak Hong-gol
248. Chu Song-il
249. Pak Pong-jo
250. Yi Sung-gi
251. Choe Chong
252. Yi Tong-song
253. Choe Min-hwan
254. Chon Cha-ryon
255. Kim Mun-gun
256. Yo Kyong-gu
257. An Sung-hak
258. Yi Hak-pin
259. Kim Kyong-hoe
260. Yi Kyong-yong
261. Yi Kwang-sil
262. Kim Ki-su
263. Yi Chae-yun
264. Kim Yang-chun
265. Han Hubang-nyo
266. Chong Chong-gi
267. Pak Sung-so
268. Han Su-dong
269. Kim I-sun
270. Choe Hak-son
271. Kim Yo-jung
272. Kim Tong-hyon
273. Kim Hi-jun
274. Hwang Won-bo
275. Yu Chae-hun
276. Sim Sang-ui
277. Chang Pyong-su
278. Yi Mae-chun
279. Kang Tok-yo
280. Chong Ki-hwan
281. Kim Chol-man
282. Hwang Won-jun
283. No Su-ok
284. Yi Song-nam
285. Pak Yong-sin
286. Yi Man-ik
287. Pak Sung-hak
288. Hwang Chang-yop
289. Han Chang-sun
290. Yi Myon-sang
291. Kim Chwa-hyok
292. Yu Pyong-yon
293. Pak Tae-jin
294. Yi Ki-yong
295. Yang Chun-hyok
296. O Chin-u
297. Nam Chun-hwa
298. Kim Pong-yul
299. O Che-ryong
300. Yi Ul-sol
301. Kim Ok-su
302. Yi Kye-san
303. Chang Chong-hwan
304. Choe Song-jip
305. Yi Sun-yong
306. Ri Tu-ik
307. Pae Ki-jun
308. Chong Ki-man
309. Kim Kum-sil
310. Pak Mun-gyu
311. Kim Chae-gu
312. Han Hong-sik
313. Pak Yong-su
314. Sim Hyong-sik
315. Pak Chong-gin
316. Chae Hui-jong
317. Chon Mun-sop
318. Pak Chan-je
319. Yi Chan-hwa
320. An Yong
321. Yun Yong-gyong
322. Yi Sok-nam
323. Chong Chong-man
324. Choe Man-guk
325. Yi Chae-yong
326. Kim Chang-dok
327. Pak Chae-pil
328. Yi Tal-yong
329. Sung Sin-bom
330. Choe Sun-nam
331. Yim Kwi-bin
332. Kim Tae-hong
333. Chu Chong-myong
334. Kim To-man
335. Kang Uk-kuk
336. Pak Sung-hup
337. Chu Sang-su
338. Yim Sun-nyo
339. Yi Yong-sun
340. Ho Sok-son
341. Kim Kyong-in
342. Yu Man-ok
343. Kim Si-jung
344. Paek Nam-un
345. Chon Man-yong
346. Yi Chang-jun
347. Ho Hak-song
348. Hong To-hak
349. Chong Wol-san
350. Yi Kuk-no
351. Kim Sok-tae
352. O Hyon-ju
353. Pak Pyong-guk
354. Yi Kun-song
355. Choe Chae-u
356. Chang Yun-pil
357. Kim Pyong-je
358. Yi Hwa-yong
359. An Tal-su
360. Chong In-son
361. Sin Myong-chol
362. Sin Ko-song
363. Pak Kyong-sun
364. Chu To-il
365. Choe Won-taek
366. Kim Tae-gun
367. Chong Song-on
368. Yi Sok-sim
369. Kim Ki-son
370. Chu Chang-jun
371. Hwang Won-nam
372. Sin Chin-sik
373. Kim Pyong-ik
374. Kwon Yong-u
375. Choe Ok-chun
376. Kim Ui-hwan
377. Yi Yong-sun
378. Yun Hyong-sik
379. Pak Ung-gol
380. Kim Chae-suk
381. Chi Pyong-hak
382. Kim Myong-ho
383. Yi Chang-sun
