= 3rd Supreme People's Assembly =

- Sign of the Supreme People's Assembly

22 October 1962 – 16 December 1967 (5 years, 55 days) Overview
- Type: Session of the Supreme People's Assembly
- Election: 8 October 1962

Leadership
- Chairman: Choe Won-taek
- Vice Chairmen: Yi Ki-yong; Kim Tuk-nan

Members
- Total: 383 deputies

The 3rd Supreme People's Assembly (SPA) was elected on 8 October 1962 and convened for its first session on 22–23 October 1962. It was replaced on 16 December 1967, by the 4th Supreme People's Assembly.

== Meetings ==
| Meeting | Start–end | Length | Session agenda |
|---|---|---|---|
| 1st Session | 22–23 October 1962 | 2 days | 8 items: 1. Establishing the 3rd Credentials Committee.; 1. Election of chairman and ordinary members; 1. Choe Yong-jin elected as chairman with Pak Ung-gol, Han Tong-baek, Yi Chae-yun, Yu Ki-ik, Chu Sang-su and No Yong-se elected as ordinary members.; 2. Election of the permanent committees of the 3rd SPA.; 1. Establishment of the Bills Committee of the Supreme People's Assembly.; 1. Elections of Bills Committee chairman; 1. Kim Ik-son elected.; 2. Election of members to the Bills Committee; 1. Ho Bong-hak, Kim Tong-gyu, Choe Ki-chol, Yi Chae-yong, Kim Hui-jun, No Ik-myong, Kim Kuk-hun and Kim Si-jung elected.; 2. Establishment of the Budget Committee of the Supreme People's Assembly.; 1. Elections of Budget Committee chairman; 1. Yim Kye-chol elected.; 2. Election of members to the Budget Committee; 1. Kang Hui-won, Chong Song-on, O Che-ryong, Yi Chan-son, Chong Chong-gi, Chang Yun-pil, Yi Chang-bok, Kim Mu-hoe, Pak Sung-hup, Chu Won-saeng, Chi Chang-gon, Yun Yon-hwan, Chon Kyong-hwa and Yi Sok-sim elected.; 3. Establishment of the Foreign Affairs Committee of the Supreme People's Assembly.; 1. Elections of Foreign Affairs Committee chairman; 1. Pak Yong-guk elected.; 2. Election of members to the Foreign Affairs Committee; 1. Kim Wal-yong, Ho Sok-son, Yu Kon-yang, Chong Kwang-nok, Kim Ok-sun and Choe Hak-son elected.; 3. Discussion of decrees issued by the 2nd Standing Committee between the 11th Session of the 2nd Supreme People's Assembly and the 1st Session of the 3rd SPA.; 1. Approved.; 4. Establishment the 3rd Standing Committee.; 1. Election of Chairman; 1. Choe Yong-gon elected.; 2. Election of vice chairmen; 1. Pak Chong-ae, Hong Myong-hui, Kang Yang-uk, Paek Nam-un and Pak Kum-chol elected.; 3. Election of Secretary-General; 1. Yim Chun-chu elected.; 4. Election of ordinary members; 1. Yi Hyo-sun, Ha Ang-chon, Hyon Mu-gwang, Pak Sin-dok, Choe Hyon, Yi Yong-ho, Kim Wal-yong, Kim Ok-sun, No Ik-myong, Kim Chang-dok, Song Yong, Yi Man-gyu, Yi Myon-sang, Kye Ung-sang, Yi Chae-bok and To Yu-ho elected.; 5. Election of the 3rd Cabinet of North Korea.; 1. Election of Premier of the Cabinet; 1. Kim Il Sung elected.; 2. Kim Il-sung propose individuals to offices in the 3rd Cabinet; 1. Proposal approved.; 6. Appointment of the Procurator-General of the Central Procurator's Office; 1. Pak Se-chang appointed.; 7. Appointment of the Chief Justice of the People's Supreme Court; 1. Kim Ik-son appointed.; 8. Kim Il-sung delivers a speech known as "Problems Confronting the DPRK". |
| 2nd Session | 9–11 May 1963 | 3 days | 2 items: 1. The account of the state budget for 1962, and proposal for the 1963 state budget; 1. Approved.; 2. Discussion of decrees issued by the 3rd Standing Committee between the 1st and 2nd sessions; 1. Approved. |
| 3rd Session | 26–28 March 1964 | 3 days | 5 items: 1. Debate on Kim Il-sung's work "Thesis on the Socialist Agrarian Problems in Our Country"; 1. Approved.; 2. Report by First Vice Premier of the Cabinet Kim Il, known as "On Strengthening the Economic Foundations of Collective Farms and Improving the Standard of Living of Farmers"; 1. Approved.; 3. Report by Minister of Foreign Affairs Pak Song-chol, known as "On Crushing the Korea-Japan Conference and Accelerating the Peaceful Unification of the Fatherland"; 1. Approved.; 4. The account of the state budget for 1963, and proposal for the 1964 state budget; 1. Approved.; 5. Discussion of decrees issued by the 3rd Standing Committee between the 2nd and 3rd sessions; 1. Approved. |
| 4th Session | 20–23 May 1965 | 4 days | 3 items: 1. On supporting Vietnam in their struggle against the United States; 1. Approved.; 2. On putting an end to the Korea-Japan conference; 1. Approved.; 3. Discussion of decrees issued by the 3rd Standing Committee between the 3rd and 4th sessions; 1. Approved. |
| 5th Session | 27–29 April 1966 | 3 days | 6 items: 1. The account of the state budget for 1965, and proposal for the 1966 state budget; 1. Approved.; 2. Report by Vice Premier of the Cabinet and Minister of Defence Kim Kwang-hyop, known as "Concerning the Complete Abolishment of the Agricultural Tax-in-Kind"; 1. Approved; 3. On combating the decision of the Government of South Korea to dispatch soldiers to South Vietnam; 1. Approved.; 4. On giving support to the proclamation of the 3rd SPA; 1. Approved.; 5. Discussion of decrees issued by the 3rd Standing Committee between the 4th and 5th sessions; 1. Approved.; 6. On organisational concerns; 1. Recall of Vice Chairman of the 3rd Standing Committee; 1. Pak Kum-chol recalled.; 2. By-election of Vice Chairman of the 3rd Standing Committee; 1. Yi Yong-ho elected.; 3. Recall of Secretary-General of the 3rd Standing Committee; 1. Yim Chun-chu recalled.; 4. By-election of Secretary-General of the 3rd Standing Committee; 1. Pak Mun-gyu elected. |
| 6th Session | 22–24 November 1966 | 3 days | 1 items: 1. Report by First Vice Premier Kim Il, known as "On the General Implementation of a System of Compulsory Nine-year Technical Education"; 1. Approved.; 2. Discussion of decrees issued by the 3rd Standing Committee between the 5th and 6th sessions; 1. Approved. |
| 7th Session | 24–26 April 1967 | 3 days | 1 items: 1. The account of the state budget for 1966, and proposal for the 1967 state budget; 1. Approved.; 2. Discussion of decrees issued by the 3rd Standing Committee between the 6th and 7th sessions; 1. Approved. |

== Officers ==
=== Chairman ===
| Name | Hangul | Took office | Left office | Duration |
|---|---|---|---|---|
| Choe Won-taek | 최원택 | 22 October 1962 | 16 December 1967 | 5 years and 55 days |

=== Vice Chairman ===
| Name | Hangul | Took office | Left office | Duration |
|---|---|---|---|---|
| Yi Ki-yong | 이기영 | 22 October 1962 | 16 December 1967 | 5 years and 55 days |
| Kim Tuk-nan | 김턱난 | 22 October 1962 | 16 December 1967 | 5 years and 55 days |

== Deputies ==
| Rank | Name | Hangul | 2nd SPA | 4th SPA | Supreme People's Assembly | | | | | | Workers' Party of Korea | | | | | |
| Rank | Name | Hangul | 2nd SPA | 4th SPA | 3rd CAB | 3rd STC | 3rd BIL | 3rd BUD | 3rd CRE | 3rd FOA | 4th CC | 4th STP | 4th POL | 4th SEC | 4th INS | 4th CAC |
|---|---|---|---|---|---|---|---|---|---|---|---|---|---|---|---|---|
| 1 | Kim Il Sung | 김일성 | Old | Reelected | Premier | — | — | — | — | — | Member | Member | Member | Gen. Sec. | — | — |
| 2 | Choe Yong-gon | 최용곤 | Old | Reelected | — | Chairman | — | — | — | — | Member | Member | Member | Member | — | — |
| 3 | Kim Il | 김일 | Old | Reelected | FV Premier | — | — | — | — | — | Member | Member | Member | Member | — | — |
| 4 | Hong Myong-hui | 홍명희 | Old | Reelected | — | V Chair | — | — | — | — | — | — | — | — | — | — |
| 5 | Pak Kum-chol | 박금철 | Old | Purged | — | V Chair | — | — | — | — | Member | Member | Member | Member | — | — |
| 6 | Kim Chang-man | 김창만 | Old | Not | V Premier | — | — | — | — | — | Member | — | Member | — | — | — |
| 7 | Yi Hyo-sun | 이효선 | Old | Purged | — | Member | — | — | — | — | Member | Member | Member | Member | — | — |
| 8 | Kim Kwang-hyop | 김광협 | Old | Reelected | V Premier | — | — | — | — | — | Member | Member | Member | Member | — | — |
| 9 | Jong Il-ryong | 정일룡 | Old | Reelected | V Premier | — | — | — | — | — | Member | — | Member | — | — | — |
| 10 | Nam Il | 남일 | Old | Reelected | V Premier | — | — | — | — | — | Member | — | Member | — | — | — |
| 11 | Ri Jong-ok | 리종옥 | Old | Reelected | V Premier | — | — | — | — | — | Member | — | Member | — | — | — |
| 12 | Pak Chong-ae | 박종애 | Old | Reelected | — | V Chair | — | — | — | — | Member | — | Member | — | — | — |
| 13 | Yi Chu-yon | 리주연 | Old | Reelected | V Premier | — | — | — | — | — | Member | — | Alternate | — | — | — |
| 14 | Kim Ik-son | 김익선 | Old | Reelected | Member | — | Chairman | — | — | — | Member | — | Alternate | — | Chairman | — |
| 15 | Ha Ang-chon | 하앙촌 | Old | Not | — | Member | — | — | — | — | Member | — | Alternate | — | — | — |
| 16 | Han Sang-du | 한상두 | Old | Reelected | Member | — | — | — | — | — | Member | — | Alternate | — | — | — |
| 17 | Chong Chun-taek | 정준택 | Old | Reelected | V Premier | — | — | — | — | — | Member | — | — | — | — | — |
| 18 | Hyon Mu-gwang | 현무광 | New | Reelected | Member | Member | — | — | — | — | Member | — | — | — | — | — |
| 19 | Kang Hui-won | 강희원 | New | Reelected | — | — | — | Member | — | — | Member | — | — | — | — | — |
| 20 | Ho Bong-hak | 호퐁학 | New | Reelected | — | — | Member | — | — | — | Member | — | Alternate | Member | — | — |
| 21 | Yom Kyong-jae | 염경재 | New | Not | — | — | — | — | — | — | — | — | — | — | — | — |
| 22 | Sin Chung-sun | 신청선 | Old | Not | — | — | — | — | — | — | — | — | — | — | — | — |
| 23 | Kim Kuk-hun | 김국훈 | New | Reelected | — | — | Member | — | — | — | — | — | — | — | — | Member |
| 24 | Choe Chang-sok | 최창석 | New | Not | Member | — | — | — | — | — | Alternate | — | — | — | — | — |
| 25 | Choe Un-hak | 최은학 | New | Reelected | — | — | — | — | — | — | — | — | — | — | — | — |
| 26 | Yi Song-un | 이송운 | Old | Not | — | — | — | — | — | — | Member | — | — | — | — | — |
| 27 | Pak Se-chang | 박세창 | New | Not | — | — | — | — | — | — | Member | — | — | — | — | — |
| 28 | Pak Kyong-suk | 박경숙 | New | Reelected | — | — | — | — | — | — | — | — | — | — | — | — |
| 29 | Kang Yang-uk | 강양욱 | Old | Reelected | — | V Chair | — | — | — | — | — | — | — | — | — | — |
| 30 | Kim Pyong-sik | 김평식 | New | Reelected | Member | — | — | — | — | — | Member | — | — | — | — | — |
| 31 | Song Tok-hun | 송톡훈 | New | Reelected | — | — | — | — | — | — | — | — | — | — | — | — |
| 32 | Yi Chong-suk | 이종석 | Old | Not | — | — | — | — | — | — | — | — | — | — | — | — |
| 33 | Tae Pyong-yol | 태평열 | New | Reelected | — | — | — | — | — | — | Alternate | — | — | — | — | — |
| 34 | Yi Chang-do | 이창도 | Old | Reelected | — | — | — | — | — | — | — | — | — | — | — | — |
| 35 | Yi Ung-won | 이웅원 | New | Reelected | — | — | — | — | — | — | — | — | — | — | — | — |
| 36 | Yi Chae-bok | 이채복 | New | Reelected | — | Member | — | — | — | — | — | — | — | — | — | — |
| 37 | Yun Pyong-gwon | 윤평권 | New | Reelected | — | — | — | — | — | — | — | — | — | — | — | — |
| 38 | Paek Ui-myong | 백의명 | New | Reelected | — | — | — | — | — | — | — | — | — | — | — | — |
| 39 | Kim Won-bin | 김원빈 | New | Reelected | — | — | — | — | — | — | — | — | — | — | — | — |
| 40 | Chon Kyong-hwa | 전경화 | New | Not | — | — | — | Member | — | — | — | — | — | — | — | — |
| 41 | Kim Su-bok | 김수복 | New | Not | — | — | — | — | — | — | — | — | — | — | — | — |
| 42 | Choe Sang-hwa | 최상화 | Old | Not | — | — | — | — | — | — | — | — | — | — | — | — |
| 43 | Ko Hyok | 고혁 | New | Not | V Premier | — | — | — | — | — | Member | — | — | — | — | — |
| 44 | Kim Tae-hyon | 김태현 | New | Reelected | — | — | — | — | — | — | Alternate | — | — | — | — | — |
| 45 | Hwang Sun-hui | 황선희 | New | Reelected | — | — | — | — | — | — | Alternate | — | — | — | — | — |
| 46 | Choe Kwang | 최광 | Old | Reelected | — | — | — | — | — | — | Member | — | Alternate | — | — | — |
| 47 | Kim Chang-bong | 김창봉 | New | Reelected | V Premier | — | — | — | — | — | Member | — | Member | — | — | — |
| 48 | Kim Chong-hang | 김종항 | New | Not | Member | — | — | — | — | — | Member | — | — | — | — | — |
| 49 | Kwon Yong-tae | 권용태 | New | Not | — | — | — | — | — | — | Member | — | — | — | — | — |
| 50 | Kim Ung-sang | 김웅상 | New | Reelected | Member | — | — | — | — | — | Alternate | — | — | — | — | — |
| 51 | Chon Chang-chol | 전창철 | New | Reelected | — | — | — | — | — | — | Member | — | — | — | — | — |
| 52 | Pak Kum-ok | 박금옥 | New | Not | — | — | — | — | — | — | — | — | — | — | — | — |
| 53 | Kim Tong-gyu | 김통규 | New | Reelected | — | — | Member | — | — | — | Member | — | Alternate | — | — | — |
| 54 | O Tong-uk | 오통욱 | New | Reelected | Member | — | — | — | — | — | Member | — | — | — | — | — |
| 55 | Kim Song-yul | 김송열 | New | Reelected | — | — | — | — | — | — | — | — | — | — | — | — |
| 56 | Yang Chong-tae | 양종태 | New | Reelected | — | — | — | — | — | — | — | — | — | — | — | — |
| 57 | Pak Song-guk | 박송국 | Old | Reelected | — | — | — | — | — | — | — | — | — | — | — | — |
| 58 | Han Tong-baek | 한통백 | Old | Not | — | — | — | — | Member | — | — | — | — | — | — | — |
| 59 | Pak Sin-dok | 박신독 | New | Reelected | — | Member | — | — | — | — | — | — | — | — | — | — |
| 60 | To Yu-ho | 유호행 | New | Not | — | Member | — | — | — | — | — | — | — | — | — | — |
| 61 | Song Yong | 송용 | Old | Reelected | — | Member | — | — | — | — | — | — | — | — | — | Member |
| 62 | Kim Won-jom | 김원점 | New | Reelected | — | — | — | — | — | — | — | — | — | — | — | — |
| 63 | Hwang Chae-son | 황채손 | New | Reelected | — | — | — | — | — | — | — | — | — | — | — | — |
| 64 | Chi Chang-gon | 치창곤 | New | Reelected | — | — | — | Member | — | — | — | — | — | — | — | — |
| 65 | O Rye-son | 오예손 | New | Not | — | — | — | — | — | — | — | — | — | — | — | — |
| 66 | Kang Wi-jun | 강위준 | New | Reelected | — | — | — | — | — | — | — | — | — | — | — | — |
| 67 | Choe Hyon | 최현 | Old | Reelected | — | Member | — | — | — | — | Member | — | Member | — | — | — |
| 68 | Kim Sang-hwan | 김상환 | New | Not | — | — | — | — | — | — | — | — | — | — | — | — |
| 69 | Kim Won-jon | 김원종 | New | Not | — | — | — | — | — | — | — | — | — | — | — | — |
| 70 | Ko Chong-ik | 고종익 | New | Not | — | — | — | — | — | — | — | — | — | — | — | — |
| 71 | Mun Chong-suk | 문종석 | New | Reelected | — | — | — | — | — | — | — | — | — | — | — | — |
| 72 | Yim Yun-sik | 임윤식 | New | Reelected | — | — | — | — | — | — | — | — | — | — | — | — |
| 73 | Kim Kum-san | 김금산 | New | Reelected | — | — | — | — | — | — | — | — | — | — | — | — |
| 74 | Chong Pyong-gap | 종평갑 | New | Reelected | — | — | — | — | — | — | Alternate | — | — | — | — | — |
| 75 | Yu Ki-ik | 유기익 | New | Not | — | — | — | — | Member | — | — | — | — | — | — | — |
| 76 | O Tae-bong | 오태봉 | New | Reelected | Member | — | — | — | — | — | Alternate | — | — | — | — | — |
| 77 | Yi Man-gyu | 이만규 | Old | Reelected | — | Member | — | — | — | — | — | — | — | — | — | — |
| 78 | Ko Chun-taek | 고춘택 | Old | Reelected | — | — | — | — | — | — | — | — | — | — | — | — |
| 79 | Yom Tae-jun | 염태준 | New | Reelected | Member | — | — | — | — | — | Alternate | — | — | — | — | — |
| 80 | Pak Kwang-son | 박광손 | New | Reelected | — | — | — | — | — | — | — | — | — | — | — | — |
| 81 | No Ik-myong | 노익명 | New | Not | — | Member | Member | — | — | — | Member | — | — | — | — | — |
| 82 | Hwang Chung-op | 황청업 | Old | Reelected | — | — | — | — | — | — | — | — | — | — | — | — |
| 83 | Pak Yong-guk | 박용국 | Old | Not | — | — | — | — | — | Chairman | Member | — | Alternate | Member | — | — |
| 84 | Kim Chang-jun | 김창준 | New | Reelected | — | — | — | — | — | — | — | — | — | — | — | — |
| 85 | Choe Chang-do | 최창도 | New | Reelected | — | — | — | — | — | — | — | — | — | — | — | — |
| 86 | An Chae-sung | 안채성 | New | Not | — | — | — | — | — | — | — | — | — | — | — | — |
| 87 | Kim Man-gum | 김만검 | Old | Reelected | Member | — | — | — | — | — | Member | — | — | — | — | — |
| 88 | Yi Yong-ho | 이용호 | New | Reelected | — | Member | — | — | — | — | Member | — | Member | — | — | — |
| 89 | Kim Pyong-su | 김평수 | New | Not | — | — | — | — | — | — | Alternate | — | — | — | — | — |
| 90 | Kang Chun-guk | 강춘국 | Old | Not | — | — | — | — | — | — | — | — | — | — | — | — |
| 91 | Pak Yong-sun | 박용선 | Old | Reelected | Member | — | — | — | — | — | Member | — | — | — | — | — |
| 92 | Choe Chun-sop | 최춘섭 | New | Reelected | — | — | — | — | — | — | — | — | — | — | — | — |
| 93 | Han Chan-ok | 한찬옥 | New | Reelected | — | — | — | — | — | — | — | — | — | — | — | — |
| 94 | Kim Nak-hui | 김낙희 | New | Reelected | — | — | — | — | — | — | — | — | — | — | — | — |
| 95 | Kim Hyon-su | 김현수 | New | Not | — | — | — | — | — | — | — | — | — | — | — | — |
| 96 | Kim Yong-ju | 김용주 | New | Reelected | — | — | — | — | — | — | Member | — | Alternate | Member | — | — |
| 97 | Cho Myong-hwa | 조명화 | New | Reelected | — | — | — | — | — | — | — | — | — | — | — | — |
| 98 | Son Won-dong | 손원동 | New | Not | — | — | — | — | — | — | — | — | — | — | — | — |
| 99 | Yi Chong-sam | 이종삼 | New | Not | — | — | — | — | — | — | — | — | — | — | — | — |
| 100 | Yi Chang-bok | 이창복 | New | Reelected | — | — | — | Member | — | — | — | — | — | — | — | — |
| 101 | An Suk-yong | 안석용 | New | Reelected | — | — | — | — | — | — | — | — | — | — | — | — |
| 102 | Yi Min-su | 이민수 | New | Reelected | — | — | — | — | — | — | — | — | — | — | Member | — |
| 103 | Cho Ung-sop | 조웅섭 | New | Not | — | — | — | — | — | — | — | — | — | — | — | — |
| 104 | Chong Tu-hwan | 종투환 | Old | Reelected | — | — | — | — | — | — | Member | — | — | — | — | — |
| 105 | Chin Pyong-mu | 진평무 | New | Reelected | — | — | — | — | — | — | — | — | — | — | — | — |
| 106 | Kim Kwan-sop | 김관섭 | New | Not | — | — | — | — | — | — | Alternate | — | — | — | — | — |
| 107 | Yi Tae-u | 이태우 | New | Not | — | — | — | — | — | — | — | — | — | — | — | — |
| 108 | Pak Song-chol | 박송철 | New | Reelected | V Premier | — | — | — | — | — | Member | — | Member | — | — | — |
| 109 | Kang Chung-yon | 강청연 | New | Not | — | — | — | — | — | — | — | — | — | — | — | — |
| 110 | Choe Tae-son | 최태손 | New | Not | — | — | — | — | — | — | — | — | — | — | — | — |
| 111 | Pak Tong-gwan | 박통관 | New | Reelected | — | — | — | — | — | — | — | — | — | — | — | — |
| 112 | Chi Myong-gwan | 치명관 | New | Not | — | — | — | — | — | — | — | — | — | — | — | — |
| 113 | Choe Ki-won | 최기원 | New | Not | — | — | — | — | — | — | — | — | — | — | — | — |
| 114 | Yi Il-gyong | 이일경 | Old | Not | Member | — | — | — | — | — | Member | — | — | — | — | — |
| 115 | Yi Tok-hyon | 이톡현 | New | Not | — | — | — | — | — | — | Alternate | — | — | — | — | — |
| 116 | Hyon Chang-yong | 현창용 | New | Reelected | — | — | — | — | — | — | — | — | — | — | — | — |
| 117 | Kim Sok-yong | 김석용 | Old | Reelected | — | — | — | — | — | — | — | — | — | — | — | — |
| 118 | Paek Son-il | 백선일 | New | Reelected | Member | — | — | — | — | — | Alternate | — | — | — | — | — |
| 119 | O Paek-ryong | 오백용 | New | Reelected | — | — | — | — | — | — | Member | — | — | — | — | — |
| 120 | Kim Tuk-nan | 김턱난 | Old | Reelected | — | — | — | — | — | — | — | — | — | — | — | — |
| 121 | Yi Tan | 이탄 | New | Reelected | — | — | — | — | — | — | — | — | — | — | — | — |
| 122 | Kim Chun-song | 김춘송 | New | Not | — | — | — | — | — | — | — | — | — | — | — | — |
| 123 | Sok San | 속산 | New | Reelected | Member | — | — | — | — | — | Member | — | Alternate | Member | — | — |
| 124 | Yi Chun-yong | 이춘용 | New | Not | — | — | — | — | — | — | — | — | — | — | — | — |
| 125 | Ko Kum-sun | 고김선 | New | Reelected | — | — | — | — | — | — | — | — | — | — | — | — |
| 126 | Kim Yang-yul | 김양열 | New | Not | — | — | — | — | — | — | — | — | — | — | — | — |
| 127 | Kim Sok-hyong | 김석형 | New | Reelected | — | — | — | — | — | — | — | — | — | — | — | — |
| 128 | Han Tae-yong | 한태용 | New | Not | Member | — | — | — | — | — | Alternate | — | — | — | — | — |
| 129 | Han Ik-su | 한익수 | New | Reelected | — | — | — | — | — | — | Member | — | — | — | — | — |
| 130 | Chong Chi-hwan | 종치환 | New | Not | — | — | — | — | — | — | Member | — | — | — | — | — |
| 131 | Kye Ung-sang | 계웅상 | Old | Not | — | Member | — | — | — | — | — | — | — | — | — | — |
| 132 | Yi Chan-son | 이찬손 | New | Reelected | — | — | — | Member | — | — | — | — | — | — | — | — |
| 133 | Kim Yong-ho | 김용호 | New | Reelected | — | — | — | — | — | — | — | — | — | — | — | — |
| 134 | So Chol | 서철 | New | Reelected | — | — | — | — | — | — | Member | — | — | — | — | — |
| 135 | Yi Won-jun | 이원준 | New | Not | — | — | — | — | — | — | — | — | — | — | — | — |
| 136 | Yim Pong-on | 임퐁온 | New | Not | — | — | — | — | — | — | — | — | — | — | — | — |
| 137 | No Yong-se | 노용세 | Old | Not | — | — | — | — | Member | — | — | — | — | — | — | — |
| 138 | Kim Tok-bok | 김톡복 | New | Not | — | — | — | — | — | — | — | — | — | — | — | — |
| 139 | Ko In-gol | 고인골 | New | Reelected | — | — | — | — | — | — | — | — | — | — | — | — |
| 140 | Kim Sung-won | 김성원 | New | Reelected | — | — | — | — | — | — | — | — | — | — | — | — |
| 141 | Yim Kye-chol | 임계철 | New | Reelected | Member | — | — | Chairman | — | — | Member | — | — | — | — | — |
| 142 | Yu Myong-ho | 유명호 | New | Not | — | — | — | — | — | — | — | — | — | — | — | — |
| 143 | Kim Myong-gyong | 김명경 | New | Not | — | — | — | — | — | — | — | — | — | — | — | — |
| 144 | Kim Tae-ryon | 김태련 | New | Not | — | — | — | — | — | — | — | — | — | — | — | — |
| 145 | Sok Chil-bo | 속칠보 | New | Reelected | — | — | — | — | — | — | — | — | — | — | — | — |
| 146 | Kim Pong-son | 김퐁손 | New | Reelected | — | — | — | — | — | — | — | — | — | — | — | — |
| 147 | Kim Song-chol | 김송철 | New | Not | — | — | — | — | — | — | — | — | — | — | — | — |
| 148 | Kang U-sik | 강우식 | New | Reelected | — | — | — | — | — | — | — | — | — | — | — | — |
| 149 | Kang Chung-han | 강청한 | New | Not | — | — | — | — | — | — | — | — | — | — | — | — |
| 150 | Kang Ho-sin | 강호신 | New | Not | — | — | — | — | — | — | — | — | — | — | — | — |
| 151 | Hwang Won-taek | 황원택 | New | Reelected | — | — | — | — | — | — | — | — | — | — | — | — |
| 152 | Han Yong-ok | 한용옥 | New | Not | — | — | — | — | — | — | — | — | — | — | — | — |
| 153 | Yim Yong-gyun | 임용균 | New | Not | — | — | — | — | — | — | — | — | — | — | — | — |
| 154 | Chang Myong-jun | 장명준 | New | Not | — | — | — | — | — | — | — | — | — | — | — | — |
| 155 | Kim Yong-uk | 김용욱 | New | Reelected | — | — | — | — | — | — | — | — | — | — | — | — |
| 156 | Won Hong-gu | 원홍구 | Old | Reelected | — | — | — | — | — | — | — | — | — | — | — | — |
| 157 | Kim Mu-hoe | 김무회 | New | Reelected | — | — | — | Member | — | — | — | — | — | — | — | — |
| 158 | Kim Chae-un | 김채은 | New | Reelected | — | — | — | — | — | — | — | — | — | — | — | — |
| 159 | Kim Chon-hwang | 김천황 | New | Reelected | — | — | — | — | — | — | — | — | — | — | — | — |
| 160 | Yu Rak-chong | 유락총 | New | Reelected | — | — | — | — | — | — | — | — | — | — | — | — |
| 161 | Choe Chang-gol | 최창골 | New | Not | — | — | — | — | — | — | — | — | — | — | — | — |
| 162 | Yang Taek-kon | 양택곤 | New | Reelected | — | — | — | — | — | — | — | — | — | — | — | — |
| 163 | Nam Son-ok | 남손옥 | New | Reelected | — | — | — | — | — | — | — | — | — | — | — | — |
| 164 | So Ul-hyon | 소울현 | New | Not | — | — | — | — | — | — | — | — | — | — | — | — |
| 165 | Kim Sok-man | 김석만 | New | Reelected | — | — | — | — | — | — | — | — | — | — | — | — |
| 166 | Kang Un-song | 강운송 | New | Reelected | — | — | — | — | — | — | — | — | — | — | — | — |
| 167 | Yu Kon-yang | 유건양 | New | Not | — | — | — | — | — | Member | — | — | — | — | — | — |
| 168 | Yi Yong-son | 이용손 | New | Reelected | — | — | — | — | — | — | — | — | — | — | — | — |
| 169 | Yon Pok-kil | 연폭길 | New | Not | — | — | — | — | — | — | — | — | — | — | — | — |
| 170 | Cho Tong-sop | 조통섭 | New | Not | Member | — | — | — | — | — | — | — | — | — | — | — |
| 171 | Kim Chung-nin | 김충닌 | New | Reelected | — | — | — | — | — | — | Alternate | — | — | Member | — | — |
| 172 | Kim Won-chong | 김원종 | New | Reelected | — | — | — | — | — | — | — | — | — | — | — | — |
| 173 | Kim Tong-sik | 김통식 | New | Not | — | — | — | — | — | — | — | — | — | — | — | — |
| 174 | Song Chang-nyom | 송창묘 | Old | Not | — | — | — | — | — | — | Alternate | — | — | — | — | — |
| 175 | Kim Pyong-mo | 김평모 | New | Not | — | — | — | — | — | — | — | — | — | — | — | — |
| 176 | Kim Tal-chun | 김탈천 | New | Not | — | — | — | — | — | — | — | — | — | — | — | — |
| 177 | Han Sung-un | 한성운 | New | Not | — | — | — | — | — | — | — | — | — | — | — | — |
| 178 | Yu Yong-sop | 유용섭 | New | Not | — | — | — | — | — | — | — | — | — | — | — | — |
| 179 | Chang Kyong-sun | 장경선 | New | Not | — | — | — | — | — | — | — | — | — | — | — | — |
| 180 | Kim Wa-ryong | 김와룡 | New | Not | — | — | — | — | — | — | — | — | — | — | — | — |
| 181 | O Kyong-ae | 오경애 | New | Reelected | — | — | — | — | — | — | — | — | — | — | — | — |
| 182 | Kim Ok-chun | 김옥천 | New | Not | — | — | — | — | — | — | — | — | — | — | — | — |
| 183 | Han Sang-sun | 한상선 | New | Not | — | — | — | — | — | — | — | — | — | — | — | — |
| 184 | Kim Won-sol | 김원솔 | New | Not | — | — | — | — | — | — | — | — | — | — | — | — |
| 185 | Kim Won-sam | 김원삼 | New | Reelected | — | — | — | — | — | — | — | — | — | — | — | — |
| 186 | Yim Chin-gyu | 임진규 | New | Reelected | — | — | — | — | — | — | Member | — | — | — | — | — |
| 187 | Paek Song-hak | 백송학 | New | Reelected | — | — | — | — | — | — | — | — | — | — | — | — |
| 188 | Kim Pyong-sun | 김평선 | New | Not | — | — | — | — | — | — | — | — | — | — | — | — |
| 189 | Chong Tong-chol | 종통철 | New | Reelected | Member | — | — | — | — | — | — | — | — | — | — | Member |
| 190 | Choe Song-nak | 최성락 | New | Not | — | — | — | — | — | — | — | — | — | — | — | — |
| 191 | Kim Won-hyong | 김원형 | New | Not | — | — | — | — | — | — | — | — | — | — | — | — |
| 192 | Chang Chong-taek | 창종택 | New | Not | — | — | — | — | — | — | — | — | — | — | — | — |
| 193 | Han Su-hyon | 한수현 | New | Reelected | — | — | — | — | — | — | — | — | — | — | — | — |
| 194 | Pak Chong-yol | 박종열 | New | Not | — | — | — | — | — | — | — | — | — | — | — | — |
| 195 | Choe Pong-sun | 최봉선 | New | Not | — | — | — | — | — | — | — | — | — | — | — | — |
| 196 | Mun Chang-sok | 문창석 | New | Not | — | — | — | — | — | — | — | — | — | — | — | — |
| 197 | Paek Song-guk | 백송국 | New | Not | — | — | — | — | — | — | — | — | — | — | — | — |
| 198 | Choe Pong-san | 최봉산 | New | Reelected | — | — | — | — | — | — | — | — | — | — | — | — |
| 199 | Kim Chin-hwa | 김진화 | New | Reelected | — | — | — | — | — | — | — | — | — | — | — | — |
| 200 | Chu Won-saeng | 추원생 | New | Not | — | — | — | Member | — | — | — | — | — | — | — | — |
| 201 | Ho Pil-su | 호필수 | New | Not | — | — | — | — | — | — | — | — | — | — | — | — |
| 202 | Yang Pok-won | 양복원 | New | Not | — | — | — | — | — | — | — | — | — | — | — | — |
| 203 | Kim Se-bong | 김세봉 | New | Not | Member | — | — | — | — | — | — | — | — | — | — | — |
| 204 | Kim Ok-sun | 김옥선 | New | Reelected | — | Member | — | — | — | — | — | — | — | — | — | — |
| 205 | Kim Hak-sun | 김학선 | New | Not | — | — | — | — | — | — | — | — | — | — | — | — |
| 206 | Yi Chae-gun | 이채군 | New | Not | — | — | — | — | — | — | — | — | — | — | — | — |
| 207 | Choe Chung-sok | 최청석 | New | Not | — | — | — | — | — | — | — | — | — | — | — | — |
| 208 | Kim Hung-il | 김정일 | Old | Reelected | — | — | — | — | — | — | — | — | — | — | — | — |
| 209 | Kim Sang-guk | 김상국 | New | Reelected | — | — | — | — | — | — | — | — | — | — | — | — |
| 210 | Hong Si-hak | 홍시학 | New | Reelected | — | — | — | — | — | — | — | — | — | — | — | — |
| 211 | Hwang Hwa-bok | 황화복 | New | Reelected | — | — | — | — | — | — | — | — | — | — | — | — |
| 212 | Kim Tong-hyok | 김통혁 | New | Not | — | — | — | — | — | — | — | — | — | — | — | — |
| 213 | Yi Pyong-bu | 이평부 | New | Reelected | — | — | — | — | — | — | — | — | — | — | — | — |
| 214 | Yu Chang-gwon | 유창권 | New | Reelected | — | — | — | — | — | — | Alternate | — | — | — | — | — |
| 215 | Yang Tae-gun | 양태군 | New | Not | — | — | — | — | — | — | — | — | — | — | — | V. Chair |
| 216 | Han Ki-chang | 한기창 | New | Reelected | — | — | — | — | — | — | — | — | — | — | — | — |
| 217 | Chong Kwang-nok | 종광녹 | New | Reelected | — | — | — | — | — | Member | — | — | — | — | — | — |
| 218 | Mun Song-sul | 문송술 | New | Reelected | — | — | — | — | — | — | — | — | — | — | — | — |
| 219 | Kim Wal-yong | 김월용 | New | Not | — | Member | — | — | — | Member | Member | — | — | — | — | — |
| 220 | Yi Yang-suk | 이양숙 | New | Reelected | Member | — | — | — | — | — | Alternate | — | — | — | — | — |
| 221 | Yi Kwang-son | 이광손 | New | Not | — | — | — | — | — | — | — | — | — | — | — | — |
| 222 | Pak Yong-song | 박용송 | New | Not | Member | — | — | — | — | — | — | — | — | — | — | — |
| 223 | Choe Ki-chol | 최기철 | New | Not | — | — | Member | — | — | — | Member | — | — | — | — | — |
| 224 | To Chong-ho | 종호행 | New | Not | — | — | — | — | — | — | — | — | — | — | — | — |
| 225 | Yi Ki-chol | 이기철 | New | Reelected | — | — | — | — | — | — | — | — | — | — | — | — |
| 226 | Yang Chung-gyom | 양충겸 | New | Not | — | — | — | — | — | — | Alternate | — | — | — | — | — |
| 227 | Choe Chung-son | 최청산 | New | Reelected | — | — | — | — | — | — | — | — | — | — | — | — |
| 228 | Kang Cho-sun | 강조선 | Old | Reelected | — | — | — | — | — | — | — | — | — | — | — | — |
| 229 | Yi Sang-un | 이상운 | New | Not | — | — | — | — | — | — | — | — | — | — | — | — |
| 230 | Ko Min-sun | 고민선 | New | Reelected | — | — | — | — | — | — | — | — | — | — | — | — |
| 231 | Choe Chil-gap | 최칠갑 | New | Reelected | — | — | — | — | — | — | — | — | — | — | — | — |
| 232 | Yi Song-yon | 이송연 | New | Not | — | — | — | — | — | — | — | — | — | — | — | — |
| 233 | Yun Ki-bok | 윤기복 | New | Not | Member | — | — | — | — | — | — | — | — | — | — | — |
| 234 | Yi Pong-nam | 이퐁남 | New | Not | — | — | — | — | — | — | — | — | — | — | — | — |
| 235 | Kim Hoe-il | 김회일 | Old | Reelected | Member | — | — | — | — | — | Member | — | — | — | — | — |
| 236 | Kang Yong-chang | 강용창 | Old | Not | — | — | — | — | — | — | Member | — | — | — | — | — |
| 237 | Yi Kuk-chin | 이국진 | New | Reelected | — | — | — | — | — | — | Alternate | — | — | Member | — | — |
| 238 | Yun Yon-hwan | 윤연환 | New | Reelected | — | — | — | Member | — | — | — | — | — | — | — | — |
| 239 | Yi Yon | 이연 | New | Reelected | — | — | — | — | — | — | — | — | — | — | — | — |
| 240 | Yim Chun-chu | 임춘추 | New | Not | — | Secretary | — | — | — | — | Member | — | Alternate | — | — | Member |
| 241 | Yi Yong-gu | 이용구 | New | Reelected | — | — | — | — | — | — | — | — | — | — | — | — |
| 242 | Choe Yong-jin | 최용진 | Old | Reelected | V Premier | — | — | — | Chairman | — | Member | — | — | — | — | — |
| 243 | Kwon Yun-il | 권윤일 | New | Reelected | — | — | — | — | — | — | — | — | — | — | — | — |
| 244 | Choe Sang-ul | 최상울 | New | Reelected | — | — | — | — | — | — | — | — | — | — | — | — |
| 245 | Yang Hyong-sop | 양형섭 | New | Reelected | — | — | — | — | — | — | — | — | — | Member | — | — |
| 246 | Pak Hong-sun | 박홍선 | New | Not | — | — | — | — | — | — | — | — | — | — | — | — |
| 247 | Pak Hong-gol | 박홍골 | New | Reelected | — | — | — | — | — | — | — | — | — | — | — | — |
| 248 | Chu Song-il | 추송일 | New | Reelected | — | — | — | — | — | — | — | — | — | — | — | — |
| 249 | Pak Pong-jo | 박퐁조 | New | Reelected | — | — | — | — | — | — | — | — | — | — | — | — |
| 250 | Yi Sung-gi | 이성기 | Old | Reelected | — | — | — | — | — | — | — | — | — | — | — | — |
| 251 | Choe Chong | 최종 | New | Not | — | — | — | — | — | — | — | — | — | — | — | — |
| 252 | Yi Tong-song | 이통송 | New | Not | — | — | — | — | — | — | — | — | — | — | — | — |
| 253 | Choe Min-hwan | 최민환 | New | Reelected | — | — | — | — | — | — | — | — | — | — | — | — |
| 254 | Chon Cha-ryon | 전차련 | New | Reelected | — | — | — | — | — | — | — | — | — | — | — | — |
| 255 | Kim Mun-gun | 김문군 | New | Reelected | — | — | — | — | — | — | — | — | — | — | — | — |
| 256 | Yo Kyong-gu | 요경구 | New | Reelected | — | — | — | — | — | — | — | — | — | — | — | — |
| 257 | An Sung-hak | 안성학 | New | Reelected | — | — | — | — | — | — | Alternate | — | — | — | — | — |
| 258 | Yi Hak-pin | 이학핀 | New | Reelected | — | — | — | — | — | — | — | — | — | — | — | — |
| 259 | Kim Kyong-hoe | 김경회 | New | Not | — | — | — | — | — | — | — | — | — | — | — | — |
| 260 | Yi Kyong-yong | 이경용 | New | Not | — | — | — | — | — | — | — | — | — | — | — | — |
| 261 | Yi Kwang-sil | 이광실 | New | Reelected | — | — | — | — | — | — | — | — | — | — | — | — |
| 262 | Kim Ki-su | 김기수 | New | Not | — | — | — | — | — | — | — | — | — | — | — | — |
| 263 | Yi Chae-yun | 이채윤 | New | Reelected | — | — | — | — | Member | — | Member | — | — | — | — | — |
| 264 | Kim Yang-chun | 김양천 | New | Reelected | — | — | — | — | — | — | — | — | — | — | — | — |
| 265 | Han Hubang-nyo | 한환뇨 | Old | Reelected | — | — | — | — | — | — | — | — | — | — | — | — |
| 266 | Chong Chong-gi | 종종기 | New | Reelected | — | — | — | Member | — | — | — | — | — | — | — | — |
| 267 | Pak Sung-so | 박성소 | New | Not | — | — | — | — | — | — | — | — | — | — | — | — |
| 268 | Han Su-dong | 한수동 | New | Not | — | — | — | — | — | — | — | — | — | — | — | — |
| 269 | Kim I-sun | 김이선 | New | Not | — | — | — | — | — | — | — | — | — | — | — | — |
| 270 | Choe Hak-son | 최학손 | New | Not | — | — | — | — | — | Member | Alternate | — | — | — | — | — |
| 271 | Kim Yo-jung | 김요정 | New | Reelected | — | — | — | — | — | — | — | — | — | — | — | Chairman |
| 272 | Kim Tong-hyon | 김통현 | New | Not | — | — | — | — | — | — | — | — | — | — | — | — |
| 273 | Kim Hi-jun | 김희준 | New | Not | — | — | Member | — | — | — | — | — | — | — | — | — |
| 274 | Hwang Won-bo | 황원보 | New | Not | — | — | — | — | — | — | Alternate | — | — | — | V. Chair | — |
| 275 | Yu Chae-hun | 유채훈 | New | Not | — | — | — | — | — | — | — | — | — | — | — | — |
| 276 | Sim Sang-ui | 심상의 | New | Not | — | — | — | — | — | — | — | — | — | — | — | — |
| 277 | Chang Pyong-su | 장평수 | New | Not | — | — | — | — | — | — | — | — | — | — | — | — |
| 278 | Yi Mae-chun | 이매춘 | New | Reelected | — | — | — | — | — | — | — | — | — | — | — | — |
| 279 | Kang Tok-yo | 강톡요 | Old | Reelected | — | — | — | — | — | — | — | — | — | — | — | — |
| 280 | Chong Ki-hwan | 종기환 | New | Not | — | — | — | — | — | — | — | — | — | — | — | — |
| 281 | Kim Chol-man | 김철만 | New | Reelected | — | — | — | — | — | — | — | — | — | — | — | — |
| 282 | Hwang Won-jun | 황원준 | New | Not | — | — | — | — | — | — | — | — | — | — | — | — |
| 283 | No Su-ok | 노숙옥 | New | Reelected | — | — | — | — | — | — | Member | — | — | — | — | — |
| 284 | Yi Song-nam | 이송남 | New | Reelected | — | — | — | — | — | — | — | — | — | — | — | — |
| 285 | Pak Yong-sin | 박용신 | Old | Reelected | Member | — | — | — | — | — | — | — | — | — | — | — |
| 286 | Yi Man-ik | 이만익 | New | Reelected | — | — | — | — | — | — | — | — | — | — | — | — |
| 287 | Pak Sung-hak | 박성학 | New | Reelected | — | — | — | — | — | — | — | — | — | — | — | — |
| 288 | Hwang Chang-yop | 황창엽 | New | Not | — | — | — | — | — | — | — | — | — | — | — | — |
| 289 | Han Chang-sun | 한창선 | New | Reelected | — | — | — | — | — | — | — | — | — | — | — | — |
| 290 | Yi Myon-sang | 이면상 | Old | Reelected | — | Member | — | — | — | — | Alternate | — | — | — | — | — |
| 291 | Kim Chwa-hyok | 김채혁 | New | Reelected | — | — | — | — | — | — | Member | — | — | — | — | — |
| 292 | Yu Pyong-yon | 유평연 | New | Reelected | — | — | — | — | — | — | — | — | — | — | — | — |
| 293 | Pak Tae-jin | 박태진 | New | Not | — | — | — | — | — | — | Alternate | — | — | — | — | — |
| 294 | Yi Ki-yong | 이기용 | Old | Reelected | — | — | — | — | — | — | — | — | — | — | — | — |
| 295 | Yang Chun-hyok | 양춘혁 | New | Reelected | — | — | — | — | — | — | — | — | — | — | — | — |
| 296 | O Jin-u | 오진우 | New | Reelected | — | — | — | — | — | — | Member | — | Alternate | — | — | — |
| 297 | Nam Chun-hwa | 남춘화 | New | Not | — | — | — | — | — | — | — | — | — | — | — | — |
| 298 | Kim Pong-yul | 김퐁열 | New | Reelected | — | — | — | — | — | — | — | — | — | — | — | — |
| 299 | O Che-ryong | 오체룡 | New | Reelected | — | — | — | Member | — | — | Member | — | — | — | — | — |
| 300 | Ri Ul-sol | 이을솔 | New | Reelected | — | — | — | — | — | — | — | — | — | — | — | — |
| 301 | Kim Ok-su | 김옥수 | New | Not | — | — | — | — | — | Member | — | — | — | — | — | — |
| 302 | Yi Kye-san | 이계산 | Old | Reelected | — | — | — | — | — | — | — | — | — | — | — | — |
| 303 | Chang Chong-hwan | 장종환 | New | Reelected | — | — | — | — | — | — | — | — | — | — | — | — |
| 304 | Choe Song-jip | 최송집 | New | Reelected | — | — | — | — | — | — | — | — | — | — | — | — |
| 305 | Yi Sun-yong | 이순용 | New | Reelected | — | — | — | — | — | — | — | — | — | — | — | — |
| 306 | Yi Tu-ik | 이투익 | New | Reelected | — | — | — | — | — | — | — | — | — | — | — | — |
| 307 | Pae Ki-jun | 배기준 | New | Not | — | — | — | — | — | — | — | — | — | — | — | Member |
| 308 | Chong Ki-man | 종기만 | New | Reelected | — | — | — | — | — | — | — | — | — | — | — | — |
| 309 | Kim Kum-sil | 김금실 | New | Reelected | — | — | — | — | — | — | — | — | — | — | — | — |
| 310 | Pak Mun-gyu | 박문규 | Old | Reelected | Member | Member | — | — | — | — | Member | — | — | — | — | — |
| 311 | Kim Chae-gu | 김채구 | New | Not | — | — | — | — | — | — | — | — | — | — | — | — |
| 312 | Han Hong-sik | 한홍식 | New | Not | — | — | — | — | — | — | — | — | — | — | — | — |
| 313 | Pak Yong-su | 박용수 | New | Reelected | — | — | — | — | — | — | — | — | — | — | — | — |
| 314 | Sim Hyong-sik | 심형식 | New | Reelected | — | — | — | — | — | — | — | — | — | — | — | — |
| 315 | Pak Chong-gin | 박종진 | New | Not | — | — | — | — | — | — | — | — | — | — | — | — |
| 316 | Chae Hui-jong | 채희종 | New | Not | — | — | — | — | — | — | Member | — | — | — | — | — |
| 317 | Jon Mun-sop | 전문섭 | New | Reelected | — | — | — | — | — | — | Member | — | — | — | — | — |
| 318 | Pak Chan-je | 박찬제 | New | Reelected | — | — | — | — | — | — | — | — | — | — | — | — |
| 319 | Yi Chan-hwa | 이찬화 | Old | Reelected | — | — | — | — | — | — | — | — | — | — | — | — |
| 320 | An Yong | 안용 | New | Reelected | — | — | — | — | — | — | Member | — | — | — | — | — |
| 321 | Yun Yong-gyong | 윤용경 | New | Not | — | — | — | — | — | — | — | — | — | — | — | — |
| 322 | Yi Sok-nam | 이석남 | Old | Reelected | — | — | — | — | — | — | — | — | — | — | — | — |
| 323 | Chong Chong-man | 종종만 | New | Not | — | — | — | — | — | — | — | — | — | — | — | — |
| 324 | Choe Man-guk | 최만국 | New | Reelected | — | — | — | — | — | — | — | — | — | — | — | — |
| 325 | Yi Chae-yong | 이채용 | New | Not | Member | — | Member | — | — | — | Member | — | — | — | — | — |
| 326 | Kim Chang-dok | 김창독 | Old | Not | — | Member | — | — | — | — | Member | — | — | — | V. Chair | — |
| 327 | Pak Chae-pil | 박채필 | New | Not | — | — | — | — | — | — | — | — | — | — | — | — |
| 328 | Yi Tal-yong | 이탈용 | New | Not | — | — | — | — | — | — | — | — | — | — | — | — |
| 329 | Sung Sin-bom | 성신봄 | New | Reelected | — | — | — | — | — | — | — | — | — | — | — | — |
| 330 | Choe Sun-nam | 최선남 | New | Reelected | — | — | — | — | — | — | — | — | — | — | — | — |
| 331 | Yim Kwi-bin | 임귀빈 | New | Reelected | — | — | — | — | — | — | — | — | — | — | — | — |
| 332 | Kim Tae-hong | 김태홍 | New | Reelected | — | — | — | — | — | — | Member | — | — | — | — | — |
| 333 | Chu Chong-myong | 추종명 | New | Reelected | — | — | — | — | — | — | — | — | — | — | — | — |
| 334 | Kim To-man | 김토만 | New | Purged | — | — | — | — | — | — | Member | — | — | Member | — | — |
| 335 | Kang Uk-kuk | 강욱국 | New | Reelected | — | — | — | — | — | — | — | — | — | — | — | — |
| 336 | Pak Sung-hup | 박성섭 | New | Not | — | — | — | Member | — | — | — | — | — | — | — | — |
| 337 | Chu Sang-su | 추상수 | Old | Reelected | — | — | — | — | Member | — | — | — | — | — | — | — |
| 338 | Yim Sun-nyo | 임순뇨 | New | Reelected | — | — | — | — | — | — | — | — | — | — | — | — |
| 339 | Yi Yong-sun | 이용선 | New | Reelected | — | — | — | — | — | — | Alternate | — | — | — | — | — |
| 340 | Ho Sok-son | 호속손 | New | Not | — | — | — | — | — | Member | Member | — | — | — | — | — |
| 341 | Kim Kyong-in | 김경인 | New | Not | — | — | — | — | — | — | — | — | — | — | — | — |
| 342 | Yu Man-ok | 유만옥 | Old | Reelected | — | — | — | — | — | — | — | — | — | — | — | — |
| 343 | Kim Si-jung | 김시정 | New | Not | — | — | Member | — | — | — | — | — | — | — | — | — |
| 344 | Paek Nam-un | 백남은 | Old | Reelected | — | V Chair | — | — | — | — | Member | — | — | — | — | — |
| 345 | Chon Man-yong | 전만용 | New | Reelected | — | — | — | — | — | — | — | — | — | — | — | — |
| 346 | Yi Chang-jun | 이창준 | New | Reelected | — | — | — | — | — | — | — | — | — | — | — | — |
| 347 | Ho Hak-song | 호학송 | Old | Not | — | — | — | — | — | — | Member | — | — | — | — | — |
| 348 | Hong To-hak | 홍토학 | New | Reelected | — | — | — | — | — | — | — | — | — | — | — | — |
| 349 | Chong Wol-san | 종월산 | New | Reelected | — | — | — | — | — | — | — | — | — | — | — | — |
| 350 | Yi Kuk-no | 이국노 | Old | Reelected | — | — | — | — | — | — | — | — | — | — | — | — |
| 351 | Kim Sok-tae | 김석태 | New | Not | — | — | — | — | — | — | — | — | — | — | — | — |
| 352 | O Hyon-ju | 오현주 | New | Reelected | — | — | — | — | — | — | Member | — | — | — | — | — |
| 353 | Pak Pyong-guk | 박평국 | New | Reelected | — | — | — | — | — | — | — | — | — | — | — | — |
| 354 | Yi Kun-song | 이건송 | New | Reelected | — | — | — | — | — | — | — | — | — | — | — | — |
| 355 | Choe Chae-u | 최채우 | New | Reelected | Member | — | — | — | — | — | Alternate | — | — | — | — | — |
| 356 | Chang Yun-pil | 장윤필 | Old | Reelected | — | — | — | Member | — | — | Alternate | — | — | — | — | — |
| 357 | Kim Pyong-je | 김평제 | Old | Not | — | — | — | — | — | — | — | — | — | — | — | — |
| 358 | Yi Hwa-yong | 이화용 | New | Not | — | — | — | — | — | — | — | — | — | — | — | — |
| 359 | An Tal-su | 안탈수 | Old | Reelected | — | — | — | — | — | — | — | — | — | — | — | — |
| 360 | Chong In-son | 종인손 | New | Reelected | — | — | — | — | — | — | — | — | — | — | — | — |
| 361 | Sin Myong-chol | 신명철 | New | Not | — | — | — | — | — | — | — | — | — | — | — | — |
| 362 | Sin Ko-song | 신코송 | New | Not | — | — | — | — | — | — | — | — | — | — | — | — |
| 363 | Pak Kyong-sun | 박경선 | New | Not | — | — | — | — | — | — | — | — | — | — | — | — |
| 364 | Chu To-il | 추도일 | New | Reelected | — | — | — | — | — | — | — | — | — | — | — | — |
| 365 | Choe Won-taek | 최원택 | Old | Reelected | — | — | — | — | — | — | Member | — | — | — | — | — |
| 366 | Kim Tae-gun | 김태군 | Old | Reelected | Member | — | — | — | — | — | Member | — | — | — | — | — |
| 367 | Chong Song-on | 종송온 | Old | Not | — | — | — | Member | — | — | — | — | — | — | — | — |
| 368 | Yi Sok-sim | 이속심 | New | Not | — | — | — | Member | — | — | — | — | — | — | — | — |
| 369 | Kim Ki-son | 김기손 | New | Reelected | — | — | — | — | — | — | — | — | — | — | — | — |
| 370 | Chu Chang-jun | 추창준 | New | Not | — | — | — | — | — | — | — | — | — | — | — | — |
| 371 | Hwang Won-nam | 황원남 | New | Reelected | — | — | — | — | — | — | — | — | — | — | — | — |
| 372 | Sin Chin-sik | 신진식 | New | Not | — | — | — | — | — | — | — | — | — | — | — | — |
| 373 | Kim Pyong-ik | 김평일 | New | Reelected | — | — | — | — | — | — | — | — | — | — | — | — |
| 374 | Kwon Yong-u | 권용우 | Old | Reelected | — | — | — | — | — | — | — | — | — | — | — | — |
| 375 | Choe Ok-chun | 최옥천 | New | Reelected | — | — | — | — | — | — | — | — | — | — | — | — |
| 376 | Kim Ui-hwan | 김의환 | New | Reelected | — | — | — | — | — | — | — | — | — | — | — | — |
| 377 | Yi Yong-sun | 이용선 | New | Not | — | — | — | — | — | — | — | — | — | — | — | — |
| 378 | Yun Hyong-sik | 윤형식 | New | Reelected | — | — | — | — | — | — | — | — | — | — | — | — |
| 379 | Pak Ung-gol | 박웅골 | New | Not | Member | — | — | — | Member | — | Alternate | — | — | — | — | — |
| 380 | Kim Chae-suk | 김채석 | New | Not | — | — | — | — | — | — | — | — | — | — | — | — |
| 381 | Chi Pyong-hak | 치평학 | New | Reelected | — | — | — | — | — | — | Member | — | — | — | — | — |
| 382 | Kim Myong-ho | 김명호 | Old | Not | — | — | — | — | — | — | — | — | — | — | — | — |
| 383 | Yi Chang-sun | 이창순 | New | Reelected | — | — | — | — | — | — | — | — | — | — | — | — |
