= 4th Standing Committee of the Supreme People's Assembly =

4th Standing Committee
- Sign of the Supreme People's Assembly

16 December 1967 – 28 December 1972 (5 years, 12 days) Overview
- Type: Standing Committee of the Supreme People's Assembly
- Election: 1st Session of the 4th Supreme People's Assembly
- Replenishment: 5th Session of the 4th Supreme People's Assembly

Leadership
- Chairman: Choe Yong-gon
- Vice Chairmen: Hong Myong-hui; Pak Chong-ae; Kang Yank-uk; Yi Yong-ho
- Secretary-General: Pak Mun-gyu

Members
- Total: 15

The 4th Standing Committee of the Supreme People's Assembly (SPA) was elected by the 1st Session of the 4th Supreme People's Assembly on 16 December 1967. It was replaced on 28 December 1972 by the 5th SPA Standing Committee and the 5th Central People's Committee.

== Members ==
Rank	Name	Hangul	3rd STC	5th CPC	5th STC	Positions
1	Choe Yong-gon	최용건	Old	Elected	Retired	Chairman of the Standing Committee of the Supreme People's Assembly
2	Hong Myong-hui	홍명희	Old	Not	Demoted	Vice Chairman of the Standing Committee of the Supreme People's Assembly
3	Pak Chong-ae	박정애	Old	Not	Demoted	Vice Chair of the Standing Committee of the Supreme People's Assembly
4	Kang Yang-uk	강량욱	Old	Elected	Retired	Vice Chairman of the Standing Committee of the Supreme People's Assembly
5	Yi Yong-ho	이용호	Old	Not	Demoted	Vice Chairman of the Standing Committee of the Supreme People's Assembly
6	Pak Mun-gyu	박문규	Old	Not	Demoted	Secretary-General of the Standing Committee of the Supreme People's Assembly
7	Choe Hyon	최현	Old	Elected	Retired	—
8	Ho Pong-hak	허봉학	New	Not	Demoted	—
9	Kim Yong-ju	김영주	New	Elected	Retired	—
10	Yi Kuk-chin	이국진	New	Not	Demoted	—
11	Choe Kwang	최광	New	Not	Demoted	—
12	O Jin-u	오진우	New	Elected	Not	—
13	Kim Tong-gyu	김동규	New	Elected	Not	—
14	Pak Sin-dok	박신독	Old	Not	Reelected	—
15	Kim Yo-jung	도유호	New	Not	Demoted	—
