= Yi Yang-suk =

North Korean politician (fl. 20th century)

- 리양숙

Minister of Textile and Paper Industry
- In office 1962–1967

Personal details
- Born: 1916
- Died: Unknown
- Citizenship: North Korea
- Party: Workers' Party of Korea
- Occupation: Politician
- Awards: Order of Kim Il Sung

Yi Yang-suk (Korean: 리양숙; 1916-?) was a communist politician from North Korea.

== Biography ==
In 1953 she served as Deputy Director of the South Hamgyong Provincial Party Committee. From 1959 she served Vice Director of the Ministry of Light Industry. 1960: Chairman of the South Pyongan Province Economic Committee. 1961 she was appointed Chairman of the Hamhung City Economic Committee. In 1962 she became Minister of Commerce. On the same year she was appointed Director of the General Bureau of Light Industry, Light Industry Committee. In 1962 she was elected Deputy to the 3rd convocation of the Supreme People's Assembly. In 1963 she was appointed Minister of Light Industry. In 1967 she was elected Deputy to the 4th convocation of the Supreme People's Assembly and from 1967 to 1972 she served as Minister of Textile and Paper Industry. In 1979 she became Chairman of the South Pyongan Province Administrative Committee. In 1980 she became a Candidate Member of the Central Committee of the WPK. In 1986 she was appointed Vice Director of the Chemical Light Industry Committee. In 1988 she was appointed Chairman of the Light Industry Committee of the Administrative Council. In 1989 she was appointed Deputy Director of the Local Industry Department of the Light Industry Committee of the Administrative Council.
