= Kye Ung-sang University =

Tertiary education institution in Sariwon, North Korea

Kye Ung-sang University (Korean: 계응상대학; Hanja: 桂應相大學)also known as Kye Ung-sang Sariwon University of Agriculture (계응상사리원농업대학) is a university in Sariwon, North Korea.

== History ==
The university was initially founded as the Sariwon University of Agriculture on September 1, 1959 (66 years ago). The university changed its name to its current name in 1990 (35 years ago), after the North Korean geneticist Kye Ung-sang, an expert in silkworms. In May 2010 the university, Pyongyang Medical College, and Pyongyang Agricultural College were made into elements of the Kim Il Sung University Council; these three institutions, however, were removed from Kim Il Sung University in October 2019.

== Works ==
During the 60th anniversary of its founding, a reporting event of its scientific technological achievements in the national agriculture department was held in September. In 2021, it was published in DPRK Today that the university's mechanical agricultural department has developed seed selection machines for wheat and barley and different kinds of complex fertilizers, along with machines for silkworm gender determinations.

== Notable alumni ==
- Xing Haiming, Chinese ambassador to South Korea
