= 3rd Standing Committee of the Supreme People's Assembly =

3rd Standing Committee
- Sign of the Supreme People's Assembly

22 October 1962 – 16 December 1967 (5 years, 61 days) Overview
- Type: Standing Committee of the Supreme People's Assembly
- Election: 1st Session of the 3rd Supreme People's Assembly
- Replenishment: 5th Session of the 3rd Supreme People's Assembly

Leadership
- Chairman: Choe Yong-gon
- Vice Chairmen: Pak Chong-ae; Hong Myong-hui; Kang Yang-uk; Paek Nam-un; Pak Kum-chol; Yi Yong-ho
- Secretary-General: Pak Mun-gyu; Yim Chun-chu

Members
- Total: 23

The 3rd Standing Committee of the Supreme People's Assembly (SPA) was elected by the 1st Session of the 3rd Supreme People's Assembly on 23 October 1962. It was replaced on 16 December 1967 by the 4th SPA Standing Committee.

== Members ==
Rank	Name	Hangul	2nd STC	4th STC	Positions
1	Choe Yong-gon	최용건	Old	Reelected	Chairman of the Standing Committee of the Supreme People's Assembly
2	Pak Chong-ae	박정애	Old	Reelected	Vice Chair of the Standing Committee of the Supreme People's Assembly
3	Hong Myong-hui	홍명희	New	Reelected	Vice Chairman of the Standing Committee of the Supreme People's Assembly
4	Kang Yang-uk	강량욱	Old	Reelected	Vice Chairman of the Standing Committee of the Supreme People's Assembly
5	Paek Nam-un	이국노	Old	Demoted	Vice Chairman of the Standing Committee of the Supreme People's Assembly
6	Pak Kum-chol	박금철	New	Purged	Vice Chairman of the Standing Committee of the Supreme People's Assembly
7	Yim Chun-chu	임춘추	New	Demoted	Secretary-General of the Standing Committee of the Supreme People's Assembly
8	Yi Hyo-sun	이효선	New	Purged	—
9	Ha Ang-chon	김천해	Old	Demoted	—
10	Hyon Mu-gwang	현무광	Old	Demoted	—
11	Pak Sin-dok	박신독	Old	Reelected	—
12	Choe Hyon	최현	New	Reelected	—
13	Yi Yong-ho	이용호	New	Reelected	—
14	Kim Wal-yong	김창독	New	Demoted	—
15	Kim Ok-sun	김옥선	New	Demoted	—
16	No Ik-myong	노익명	New	Demoted	—
17	Kim Chang-dok	김창독	Old	Demoted	—
18	Song Yong	송용	Old	Demoted	—
19	Yi Man-gyu	이만규	Old	Demoted	—
20	Yi Myon-sang	이면상	Old	Demoted	—
21	Kye Ung-sang	계웅상	Old	Demoted	—
22	Yi Chae-bok	이채복	New	Demoted	—
23	To Yu-ho	도유호	New	Demoted	—

== Replacements ==
Replaced		Replacement		5th SES	4th STC	Position
Name	Hangul	Name	Hangul	Date	4th STC	Position
Pak Kum-chol	박금철	Yi Yong-ho	이용호	29 April 1966	Reelected	Vice Chairman of the Standing Committee of the Supreme People's Assembly
Yim Chun-chu	임춘추	Pak Mun-gyu	박문규	29 April 1966	Reelected	Secretary-General of the Standing Committee of the Supreme People's Assembly
