= Pak Yong-sun (politician) =

North Korean politician (1905–1987)

- 박영순

Delegate to Supreme People's Assembly

2nd SPA
- In office 1959 – 23 October 1962

3rd SPA
- In office 22 October 1962 – 16 December 1967

4th SPA
- In office 14 December 1967 – 25 December 1972

5th SPA
- In office 25 December 1972 – 17 December 1977

6th SPA
- In office 17 December 1977 – 5 April 1982

7th SPA
- In office 5 April 1982 – 2 November 1986

8th SPA
- In office 2 November 1986 – 18 August 1987

Central Committee of the Workers' Party of Korea

4th CC of WPK
- In office 18 September 1961 – 13 November 1970

5th CC of WPK
- In office 13 November 1970 – 14 October 1980

6th CC of WPK
- In office 14 October 1980 – 18 August 1987

Personal details
- Born: October 19, 1905 Kyongwon County, North Hamgyong Province
- Died: August 18, 1987 (aged 81)
- Awards: ???? Hero of the Republic ???? Order of Kim Il Sung

Korean name
- Hangul: 박영순
- Hanja: 朴英淳
- RR: Bak Yeongsun
- MR: Pak Yŏngsun

Pak Yong-sun (19 October 1905 – 18 August 1987) was a North Korean guerilla fighter, and later a politician after liberation, being a deputy to the Supreme People's Assembly and a member of the Central Committee of the Workers' Party of Korea.

== Early life ==
Pak Yong-sun was in Kyongwon, in North Hamgyong Province in either 19 October 1905 or 1909. He completed primary school by 1919, and was subsequently sent to work in Kaolin mines near Hoeryong by 1924. In 1927, he entered joined Anti-Japanese movements, for which he was imprisoned in 1930. After being released around or before 1933, he moved to Jiandao, and started producing weaponry for the anti-Japanese movements. According to his recollections, he first met Kim Il Sung around this time, in November 1932 while he was in a secret munitions workshop, who encouraged him to further the process of constructing weaponry. As a result, he became a member of the guerilla unit in the Yanji area under Kim Il Sung from 1934. He operated a secret camp from 1936 in Musong-hyon to support the rear of the guerilla effort. He was known as a master of the 'Yanji bomb', a gunpowder-filled improvised explosive device used against the Japanese.

== Career ==
In 1945, during the liberation of Korea, he marched into Pyongyang as part of the 88th brigade of independence, Far Eastern Army. He first entered politics in 1946, becoming the vice chairman of the Chongjin city committee. From 1946, he was the director of communications for the Ministry of State Security. In his position, he helped the establishment of the Korean People's Army, by attending conferences on the formation of a regular army.

Pak Yong-sun was first elected to the second Supreme People's Assembly in 1959, then elected to the fourth Central Committee of the Workers' Party of Korea. He was reelected to both positions repeatedly until his death in 1987. During the 4th Supreme People's Assembly, he was also the minister for communications, and he was described as an expert of telecommunications.

He was the museum director of the Korean Revolution Museum since either 1973 or January 1971.

He led several delegations of the Standing Committee of the Supreme People's Assembly on a number of unofficial overseas visits to East Germany, China, the USSR, Romania and Czechoslovakia.

He is known to have been awarded both the Order of Kim Il Sung and Hero of the Republic; however, the date when it was awarded is unknown.

== Works ==
- Pak Yong Sun (1970). "'There is nothing impossible once we determine to do'". Reminiscences of the Anti-japanese Guerillas. Pyongyang: Foreign Languages Publishing House. OCLC 3207399.
