= Chang Yun-pil =

North Korean politician (1916–1985)

- 장윤필

Member of the Supreme People's Assembly
- Supreme Leader: Kim Il Sung

Personal details
- Born: 10 July 1916 Korea, Empire of Japan
- Died: 9 December 1985 (aged 69)
- Citizenship: North Korean
- Party: Workers' Party of Korea

Chang Yun-pil (Korean: 장윤필) (10 July 1916 – 9 December 1985) was a North Korean politician who served as a member of the Supreme People's Assembly, the North's unicameral parliament.

== Biography ==
He became a member of the Political Security Department in 1946. During the Korean War, he was appointed vice-chairman of the South Pyongan Provincial People's Committee. After the end of the war, in June 1956, he was appointed as Chairman of the People's Committee of South Pyongan Province. In August 1957, he was elected as a delegate to the 2nd Supreme People's Assembly and a member of the Budget Deliberation Committee at the first meeting of the 2nd Supreme People's Assembly. In July 1961, he was appointed as People's Chairman of South Hwanghae Province, and in September 1961, he was elected as a candidate (alternate) member of the 4th Central Committee at the 4th Party Congress. In October 1962, he was re-elected as a deputy and member of the budget deliberation committee of the 3rd Supreme People's Assembly. In October 1971, he served as a member of the funeral commission of Pak Mun-gyu, and in December 1972 he served as a member of the funeral commission of Ri Kyong-sok (Korean: 리경석). In the 1972 North Korean parliamentary election he was elected to the 5th Supreme People's Assembly. In January 1982, he was re-elected as a delegate to the 7th Supreme People's Assembly and again as a member of the budget deliberation committee. In November 1984, he served as a member of Kim Man-gum. On April 13, 1985, he received the Order of Kim Il Sung on the 40th anniversary of liberation and the 40th anniversary of the founding of the Party. He died at 10:30 on December 9, 1985.
