= Ri Ki-yong =

North Korean writer (1896–1984)

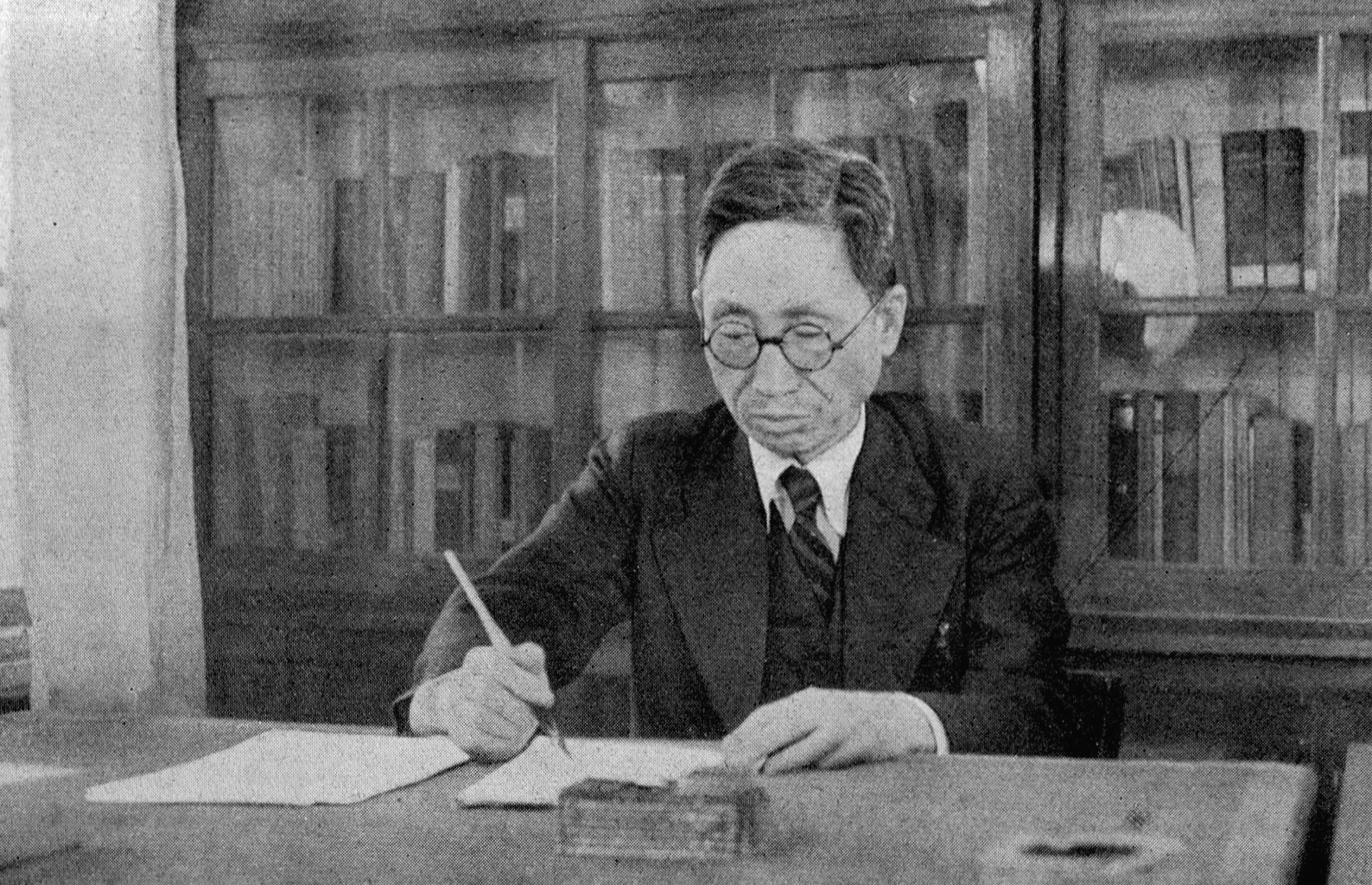
- Born: May 29, 1895; Asan, South Chungcheong Province, Joseon
- Died: August 9, 1984 (aged 89); Pyongyang, North Korea
- Writing career
- Language: Korean

Korean name
- Hangul: 리기영
- Hanja: 李箕永
- RR: Ri Giyeong
- MR: Ri Kiyŏng

Ri Ki-yong (Korean: 리기영; May 6, 1896 – August 9, 1984) or Lee Gi-yeong was a Korean novelist.

== Life ==
Ri Ki-yong was born in Asan, South Chungcheong Province, Joseon. He wrote under the name Minchon. Ri attended the Seiisku School of English in Tokyo, Japan, He worked as a member of KAPF in 1925 and was the organizer of the Choson Proletarian Writers' Federation in Seoul as well as the leader of the North Choson Federation of Literature and Arts. 1926, he served as an editor of Light of Joseon (Joseon jigwang), an organ of the Korean Communist Party and a journal promoting proletarian literature. Ri Ki-yong spent more than two years in jail.

After liberation from Japanese colonial rule, Ri moved to North Korea where he was key in creating the orthodox position on literature in North Korea, serving for several years in a key position in North Korean Federation of Literature and Arts. He is reported to have died in August 1988.

== Work ==
The Korea Literature Translation Institute summarizes his contributions to literature:

One of the leading writers to emerge from the proletarian literature camp, Ri Ki-yong explored miserable lives of peasants exploited by their landlords and oppressed by colonial capitalism. Flood (Hongsu) and Rat Fire (Seohwa) represent quintessential “peasant literature” and describe the reality of rural hardships through the proletarian perspective. Seohwa, in particular, makes a keen observation of the dual nature of peasants as part of proletarian class as well as propertied class. While the debate concerning peasant literature at the time focused on defining the relationship between peasants and the urban proletariat, Ri Ki-yong proposed that the peasants, under the colonial capitalism, is no longer a unified class. His works identify the extremely poor peasantry, equipped with anti-imperialist perspective through their firsthand experiences with oppression, as the suitable comrade to the proletariat in class struggles. His views are perfected in his landmark novel Hometown (Gohyang), first serialized in The Chosun Ilbo. Hometown (Gohyang), like Lee Gwangsu's Dust (Heuk) and Shim Hun's The Evergreen (Sangnoksu), focuses on intellectuals who return to their hometown and devote their lives to the project of enlightening oppressed peasants.

Like many other North Korean writers, even famous ones, Ri is not well known in his home country, where biographical details of writers are generally not made known to the reading public. Tatiana Gabroussenko describes how, when she interviewed defectors, she:

repeatedly came across experienced school teachers of literature who would claim, for instance, ... that New Spring in Seokkaeul was written by Lee Gi-yeong. The equivalent of this in Western literature would be to mistake a poem of [William] Shakespeare for that of [Rudyard] Kipling.

== Works in Translation ==
German

- Heimat (고향)

English

- Selections from his novel "Spring" (이기영, "봄", 1940), in Samuel Perry's 2023 A Century of Queer Korean Fiction.

== Works ==
- Seohwa〈서화〉
- Ingan suop〈인간수업〉
- Kohyang 〈고향〉Home village 1934
- Shin gaeji〈신개지〉「新開地」 Newly ploughed land serialised
- Ddang〈땅〉Soil, 1949
- Tuman gang〈두만강〉, Tumen River
- Bom〈봄〉Springtime serialised in the Dong-A Ilbo 1940

== See also ==
- Cho Ki-chon
- Han Sorya
- Korean literature
- North Korean literature

== Links ==
- Grave
