= Ho Bong-hak =

North Korean general and politician (died after 1969)

Head of the KPA General Political Department
- Supreme Leader: Kim Il Sung

Member of the Supreme People's Assembly

Personal details
- Born: North Hamgyong Province, North Korea
- Citizenship: North Korean
- Party: Workers' Party of Korea

Military service
- Allegiance: North Korea
- Branch/service: Korean People's Army
- Rank: Sangjang (Colonel-general)

Korean name
- Hangul: 허봉학
- Hanja: 許鳳學
- RR: Heo Bonghak
- MR: Hŏ Ponghak

Ho Bong-hak (Korean: 허봉학) was a military officer and politician of North Korea. He served as a commander of the People's Army during the Korean War and later was a member of the Central Committee of the Workers' Party of Korea as well as member of the Supreme People's Assembly, North Korea's unilateral parliament.

== Biography ==
During the Korean War, he served as a commander in the Korean People's Army, and in 1951 as the Commander of the 4th Corps. In 1958 he was promoted to Lieutenant General of the People's Army and served as President of the Korean People's Army Military University. In 1959, he passed through the commander of the People's Army's II Corps, and in 1960, emerged as the National Security Agency, and then was promoted to the People's Army, becoming the Director of the General Political Bureau of the People's Army.

After that, he served as secretary of the secretariat of the Central Committee of the Workers' Party of Korea, a member of the Standing Committee of the Supreme People's Assembly, and a secretary of the Central Committee of the Workers' Party of Korea. Since 1962, he has been elected to the 3rd and 4th convocations of the Supreme People's Assembly. He was suddenly purged in March 1969.
