= Kye Ung-sang =

North Korean geneticist (1893–1967)

Kye Ung Sang
- Born: 1893; Chongju
- Died: 1967 (aged 73–74); North Korea

Kye Ung Sang (Korean: 계응상; Hanja: 桂應祥, 1893 – 1967) was a North Korean geneticist and expert on silkworms.

== Biography ==
Kye was born in 1893 to a poor peasant family in Chongju. He studied with the help of his study mates while private tutoring in Seoul and Japan. After graduating from University overseas, he published five theses about the anatomy and physiology and silkworm genetics. In 1930, he published eight theses in Gwangzhou China, where he was a professor of agriculture in a local university. He traveled to Haiphong, Hanoi, Kobe, and Hong Kong, and attempted to do scientific research at the Chaeryong research centre of sericulture, but could not proceed further, as he was limited by Japanese colonial authorities. After liberation, he became a professor at Kim Il Sung University in 1946. He criticized the genetic theories of Trofim Lysenko (which rejected Mendelian genetics and proclaimed a "genetics mixed with genes and environmental factors", that acknowledged inheritance of acquired characteristics), that was increasingly becoming mainstream in North Korea due to Soviet influences. In 1949, North Korea attempted abolishing classical genetics in favor of Lysenkoism and fired Kye; however he refused to accept Lysenkoism and furthered his research in North Korea based in classical genetics. He developed several variants of silkworms known as "Gaduknue 54" and "Gaduknue 64" that were appropriate to the North Korean climate. He had been elected as member of the Supreme People's Assembly. He unexpectedly died in 1967 due to a car accident.

== Legacy and awards ==
He was awarded the Hero of Labor and People's Prize in 1963. He is buried in the Patriotic Martyrs' Cemetery.

== See also ==
- Kye Ung-sang University
