= Mun Song-sul =

North Korean politician

Personal details
- Died: 1997 North Korea
- Cause of death: Torture and murder
- Political party: Workers' Party of Korea

- Mun Song-sul
- Hangul: 문성술
- RR: Mun Seongsul
- MR: Mun Sŏngsul

Mun Song-sul (died 1997) was a North Korean politician. He served as a secretary of the Workers' Party of Korea. In 1997, he was arrested together with his relatives and later "tortured and beaten to death" on the orders of Jang Song-thaek, after he had spied on him and curtailed his influence.

== Works ==
- Mun Song-sul (February 1977). "Brilliant Embodiment of the Great Leader Style Work Method by our Party" (PDF). Kulloja. OCLC 9516938.
- — (August 1984). "Party Functionaries Must be Skillful in Method and Amicable in Attitude" (PDF). Kulloja. OCLC 9516938.
- — (October 1985). "The Korean Workers Party Is an Invincible Party that Has Realized the Most Solid and Viable Unity and Solidarity" (PDF). Kulloja. OCLC 9516938.
