= Ri Sung-gi =

North Korean chemist (1905–1996)

- Born: October 1, 1905; Damyang, South Jeolla Province, Korean Empire
- Died: February 8, 1996 (aged 90)
- Occupation: Chemist

- Ri Sung-gi
- Hangul: 리승기
- Hanja: 李升基
- RR: Ri Seunggi
- MR: Ri Sŭnggi

Ri Sung-gi, also often spelled Lee Sung-ki, Lee Seung-gi or Yi Sung-gi (October 1, 1905 – February 8, 1996), was a North Korean chemist. He is best remembered as one of the inventors of Vinalon. He has also been accused of involvement in North Korea's chemical and nuclear weapons programs.

Ri was born in Damyang, South Jeolla Province, Korean Empire in 1905. He graduated from the local pot'ong hakkyo and received his degree in chemistry from Kyoto University in 1931. He developed Vinalon in 1939 alongside Ichiro Sakurada and Hiroshi Kawakami. In 1946, after Korean independence from Japanese occupation, he participated in the development of Gyeongseong University, but strongly opposed the university's official conversion to Seoul National University under the American military government. Following the outbreak of the Korean War in 1950, he defected to the North.

Ri received the Lenin Prize in 1962, and was made head of the North Korean Atomic Energy Research Institute in June 1965. He became chief of the Hamhŭng branch of the Academy of Sciences in 1984.

== Works ==
- Li, Sung Gi (1977). "Story About Vinalon". Envying No One and Nothing in the World. Pyongyang: Foreign Languages Publishing House. OCLC 891429350.
