= Kim Tong-gyu =

North Korean politician (1915–?)

- 김동규

Member of the WPK Politburo
- In office 1970–1977
- President: Kim Il Sung

Personal details
- Born: 1915
- Party: Workers' Party of Korea

Kim Tong-gyu (Korean: 김동규; 1915 - unknown) was a politician of North Korea who served as Vice President of North Korea.

== Biography ==
Kim was born in former Manchuria in northeastern China. He took part in anti-Japanese guerrilla warfare, and studied in Soviet Union.

In 1961, he became a member of the 4th Central Committee of the Workers' Party of Korea. In 1962, he became a delegate of the Supreme People's Assembly. In November 1970, he became a member of the 5th WPK Political Committee at the 5th Congress of the Workers' Party of Korea. He became a member of the Central People's Committee (the predecessor of the Cabinet of North Korea) when it was established at the first meeting of the 5th term of the Supreme People's Assembly in December 1972.

He was elected vice president at the 4th meeting of the 5th convocation of the Supreme People's Assembly in November 1974 and was mainly involved in diplomacy. In June 1976, at the party political committee, he said, "The successor's emergence is too quick. We must strengthen our education with a time that the people can be satisfied with." He criticized the creation of a successor system.

He was purged in October 1977 and was not re-elected as Vice Chairman and Central People's Committee at the 6th session of the 1st session in December 1977. He is assumed to have been purged and exiled due to his opposition to the Kim Jong Il succession, and later detained in a concentration camp.
