= 7th Supreme People's Assembly =

- Sign of the Supreme People's Assembly

5 April 1982 – 30 December 1986 (4 years, 269 days) Overview
- Type: Session of the Supreme People's Assembly
- Election: 28 February 1982

Leadership
- Chairman: Hwang Jang-yop
- Vice Chairmen: Hong Ki-mun; Ho Jong-suk

Members
- Total: 615 deputies

The 7th Supreme People's Assembly (SPA) was elected on 28 February 1982 and convened for its first session on 5 April 1982. It was replaced in 1986 by the 8th Supreme People's Assembly.

== Meetings ==
| Meeting | Start–end | Length | Session agenda |
|---|---|---|---|
| 1st Session | 25–28 December 1972 | 4 days | 8 items: 1. On the socialist constitution of North Korea.; 1. Opening remarks by Choe Yong-gon.; 2. Report by Kim Il Sung, known as "Let Us Strengthen the Socialist System of Our Country".; 3. Reading by Kim Il on the draft proposal of a new North Korean constitution.; 4. Debate on the draft constitution by Pak Song-chol, Han Ik-su, Yang Hyong-sop, Jong Jun-gi, Ho Tam, Yun Ki-bok, Pak Sin-dok, Pak Hun, Yang Sun-do and Hwang Jang-yop.; 5. Debate on Kim Il Sung's report by Kim Chung-nin, Chong Chun-taek, Kang Yang-uk, Ho Jong-suk, Yi Sung-gi, Pyon Chang-bok, Choe Ik-kyu, Yi Yong-bok, Kang Song-san, Kim Pok-sin, Son Song-pil, Pak Chun-sik, Yi Cha-son, Kim Sok-hwa, Pak Pok-sun and Kim Sok-hyong.; 2. Election of officials to central state organisations; 1. Report by Kim Tong-gyu on behalf of the 5th Credentials Committee.; 2. Election of the President of North Korea; 1. Kim Il nominates Kim Il Sung.; 1. Nomination discussed by O Jin-u, Yom Tae-jun, Kim I-hun and Kim Tuk-nan.; 1. Kim Il Sung elected; 3. Election of the vice presidents of North Korea; 4. Election of members to the Central People's Committee; 5. Election of the Chairman of the Standing Committee of the Supreme People's Assembly; 6. Election of the Vice Chairs of the Standing Committee of the Supreme People's Assembly; 7. Election of members of the 5th Standing Committee; 8. Election of the Premier of the Administrative Council; 9. Election of the Vice Premier of the Administrative Council; 10. Election of the Vice Chairman of the National Defense Commission; 11. Election of the Chairman of the Auditing Committee of the Supreme People's Assembly; 12. Election of the Vice Chairman of the Auditing Committee of the Supreme People's Assembly; 13. Election of the Chief Justice of the Supreme Court; 14. Appointment of Chief Procurator of the Central Procurator's Office; |
| 2nd Session | 5–10 April 1973 | 6 days | 1 item |
| 3rd Session | 20–25 March 1974 | 6 days | 1 item |
| 4th Session | 27–30 November 1974 | 4 days | 1 item |
| 5th Session | 8–10 April 1975 | 3 days | 2 items |
| 6th Session | 27–29 April 1976 | 3 days | 2 items |
| 7th Session | 26–29 April 1977 | 4 days | 2 items |

== Officers ==
=== Chairman ===
| Name | Korean | Gender | Took office | Left office | Duration |
|---|---|---|---|---|---|
| Hwang Chang-yop | 황장엽 | Male | 5 April 1982 | 7 April 1983 | 1 year and 2 days |
| Yang Hyong-sop | 양형섭 | Male | 7 April 1983 | 30 December 1986 | 3 years and 267 days |

=== Vice Chairman ===
| Name | Korean | Gender | Took office | Left office | Duration |
|---|---|---|---|---|---|
| Ho Chong-suk | 정자 | Female | 5 April 1982 | 7 April 1983 | 1 year and 2 days |
| Hong Ki-mun | 홍기문 | Male | 5 April 1982 | 7 April 1983 | 1 year and 2 days |
| Son Song-pil | 손송필 | Male | 7 April 1983 | 30 December 1986 | 3 years and 267 days |
| Yo Yon-ku | 요용구 | Female | 7 April 1983 | 30 December 1986 | 3 years and 267 days |

== Deputies ==
| Name | Korean | 6th SPA | 8th SPA | Gender | Military | Membership |
|---|---|---|---|---|---|---|
| An Hak-sung | | Not made public | Not | Male | Civilian | — |
| An Kyong-hyon | | Not made public | Not | Male | Civilian | — |
| An Myong-ok | | Not made public | Not | Male | Civilian | — |
| An Pyong-mo | | Not made public | Not | Male | Civilian | — |
| An Pyong-mu | | Not made public | Not | Male | Civilian | — |
| An Sung-hak | | Not made public | Not | Male | Civilian | — |
| An Tal-su | | Not made public | Not | Male | Civilian | — |
| An Tan-sil | | Not made public | Not | Male | Civilian | — |
| An Yon-suk | | Not made public | Not | Male | Civilian | — |
| Cha Kye-yong | | Not made public | Not | Male | Civilian | — |
| Cha Pong-yong | | Not made public | Not | Male | Civilian | — |
| Cha Sung-ui | | Not made public | Not | Male | Civilian | — |
| Cha Yong-pyo | | Not made public | Not | Male | Civilian | — |
| Chae Hui-chong | | Not made public | Not | Male | Civilian | — |
| Chae Tae-suk | | Not made public | Not | Male | Civilian | — |
| Chang Chang-mun | | Not made public | Not | Male | Civilian | — |
| Chang Kuk-chan | | Not made public | Not | Male | Civilian | — |
| Chang Song-u | | Not made public | Not | Male | Civilian | — |
| Chang Tae-sik | | Not made public | Not | Male | Civilian | — |
| Chang Tong-sun | | Not made public | Not | Male | Lt. Gen. | — |
| Chang Un-sang | | Not made public | Not | Male | Civilian | — |
| Chang Yun-pil | | Not made public | Not | Male | Civilian | — |
| Chi Chang-ik | | Not made public | Not | Male | Civilian | — |
| Chi Chang-se | | Old | Reelected | Male | Civilian | — |
| Chin Chang-hu | | Not made public | Not | Male | Civilian | — |
| Cho Chang-tok | | Not made public | Not | Male | Civilian | — |
| Cho Hui-won | | Not made public | Not | Male | Civilian | — |
| Cho Hum-ki | | Not made public | Not | Male | Civilian | — |
| Cho Hye-suk | | Not made public | Not | Male | Civilian | — |
| Cho Kwan-kun | | Not made public | Not | Male | Civilian | — |
| Cho Mi-ni | | Not made public | Not | Male | Civilian | — |
| Cho Myong-nok | | Not made public | Not | Male | Lt. Gen. | — |
| Cho Myong-son | | Not made public | Not | Male | Lt. Gen. | — |
| Cho Sa-yong | | Not made public | Not | Male | Civilian | — |
| Cho Se-hung | | Not made public | Not | Male | Civilian | — |
| Cho Song-chol | | Not made public | Not | Male | Civilian | — |
| Cho Sung-ho | | Not made public | Not | Male | Civilian | — |
| Cho Sun-paek | | Not made public | Not | Male | Civilian | — |
| Cho Yong-ki | | Not made public | Not | Male | Civilian | — |
| Cho Yong-nam | | Not made public | Not | Male | Civilian | — |
| Cho Yong-sik | | Not made public | Not | Male | Civilian | — |
| Cho Yun-hui | | Not made public | Not | Male | Civilian | — |
| Choe Chae-hyon | | Not made public | Not | Male | Civilian | — |
| Ch'oe Chae-u | | Not made public | Not | Male | Civilian | — |
| Choe Chang-hak | | Not made public | Not | Male | Civilian | — |
| Choe Chang-sik | | Not made public | Not | Male | Civilian | — |
| Choe Chil-kap | | Not made public | Not | Male | Civilian | — |
| Choe Chin-song | | Not made public | Not | Male | Civilian | — |
| Choe Chong-kun | | Not made public | Not | Male | Civilian | — |
| Choe Chung-san | | Not made public | Not | Male | Civilian | — |
| Choe Chung-son | | Not made public | Not | Male | Civilian | — |
| Choe Hak-kun | | Not made public | Not | Male | Civilian | — |
| Choe Hye-suk | | Not made public | Not | Female | Civilian | — |
| Choe Hyon-ki | | Not made public | Not | Male | Civilian | — |
| Choe In-tok | | Not made public | Not | Male | Col. Gen. | — |
| Choe Kil-sun | | Not made public | Not | Male | Civilian | — |
| Choe Ki-ok | | Not made public | Not | Male | Civilian | — |
| Choe Kong-hun | | Not made public | Not | Male | Civilian | — |
| Choe Kum-son | | Not made public | Not | Male | Civilian | — |
| Choe Kwang | | Not made public | Not | Male | Lt. Gen. | — |
| Choe Kye-son | | Not made public | Not | Male | Civilian | — |
| Choe Man-hyon | | Not made public | Not | Male | Civilian | — |
| Choe Mun-son | | Not made public | Not | Male | Civilian | — |
| Choe Pyong-hwan | | Not made public | Not | Male | Civilian | — |
| Choe Pyong-ku | | Not made public | Not | Male | Civilian | — |
| Choe Sang-uk | | Not made public | Not | Male | Maj. Gen. | — |
| Choe Sang-yun | | Not made public | Not | Male | Civilian | — |
| Choe Song-hye | | Not made public | Not | Male | Civilian | — |
| Choe Su-bon | | Not made public | Not | Male | Civilian | — |
| Choe Su-hyon | | Not made public | Not | Male | Civilian | — |
| Choe Sung-pom | | Not made public | Not | Male | Civilian | — |
| Choe Sun-tae | | Not made public | Not | Male | Civilian | — |
| Choe Tae-pok | | Not made public | Not | Male | Civilian | — |
| Choe Tong-hui | | Not made public | Not | Male | Civilian | — |
| Choe Ung-su | | Not made public | Not | Male | Civilian | — |
| Choe Yol-hui | | Not made public | Not | Male | Civilian | — |
| Choe Yong-il | | Old | Reelected | Male | Civilian | — |
| Choe Yong-nim | | Not made public | Not | Male | Civilian | — |
| Choe Yun-to | | Not made public | Not | Male | Civilian | — |
| Chon Chin-su | | Not made public | Not | Male | Civilian | — |
| Chon Ha-chol | | Not made public | Not | Male | Civilian | — |
| Chon Hui-chong | | Not made public | Not | Male | Civilian | — |
| Chon In-tok | | Not made public | Not | Male | Civilian | — |
| Chon Kum-son | | Not made public | Not | Female | Civilian | — |
| Chon Kwang-chun | | Not made public | Not | Male | Civilian | — |
| Chon Kyong-kun | | Not made public | Not | Male | Civilian | — |
| Chon Mun-sop | | Not made public | Not | Male | Lt. Gen. | — |
| Chon Mun-uk | | Not made public | Not | Male | Lt. Gen. | — |
| Chon Myong-sim | | Not made public | Not | Female | Civilian | — |
| Chon Myong-su | | Not made public | Not | Male | Civilian | — |
| Chon Pil-nyo | | Not made public | Not | Female | Civilian | — |
| Chon Pyong-ho | | Not made public | Not | Male | Civilian | — |
| Chon Se-pong | | Not made public | Not | Male | Civilian | Standing Committee |
| Chon Sun-sil | | Not made public | Not | Male | Civilian | — |
| Chon Yong-chun | | Not made public | Not | Male | Civilian | — |
| Chon Yong-hun | | Not made public | Not | Male | Civilian | — |
| Chon Yong-sik | | Not made public | Not | Male | Civilian | — |
| Chong Chang-ik | | Not made public | Not | Male | Civilian | — |
| Jong Jun-gi | | Not made public | Not | Male | Civilian | — |
| Jong Chun-sil | | Old | Reelected | Female | Civilian | — |
| Chong Hae-son | | Not made public | Not | Male | Civilian | — |
| Chong Hui-chol | | Old | Reelected | Male | Civilian | — |
| Chong Hwa-sop | | Not made public | Not | Male | Civilian | — |
| Chong In-chun | | Not made public | Not | Male | Civilian | — |
| Chong Ki-yong | | Old | Reelected | Male | Civilian | — |
| Chong Kyong-hui | | Not made public | Not | Female | Civilian | — |
| Chong Mun-su | | Not made public | Not | Male | Civilian | — |
| Chong Mun-yong | | Not made public | Not | Male | Civilian | — |
| Chong Pong-hwa | | Not made public | Not | Male | Civilian | — |
| Chong Sin-hyok | | Not made public | Not | Male | Civilian | — |
| Chong Song-nam | | Not made public | Not | Male | Civilian | — |
| Chong song-ok | | Not made public | Not | Male | Civilian | — |
| Chong Tae-ik | | Not made public | Not | Male | Civilian | — |
| Chong Tong-chol | | Not made public | Not | Male | Civilian | Standing Committee |
| Chong Tong-ik | | Not made public | Not | Male | Civilian | — |
| Chong To-son | | Not made public | Not | Male | Civilian | — |
| Chong Yon-hwa | | Not made public | Not | Male | Civilian | — |
| Chong Yu-sam | | Not made public | Not | Male | Civilian | — |
| Chu Chang-chun | | Not made public | Not | Male | Civilian | — |
| Chu Chang-chun | | Not made public | Not | Male | Civilian | — |
| Chu Chi-won | | Not made public | Not | Male | Civilian | — |
| Chu Song-il | | Not made public | Not | Male | Civilian | — |
| Chu Sung-nam | | Not made public | Not | Male | Civilian | — |
| Chu Sung-Sop | | Not made public | Not | Male | Civilian | — |
| Chu To-il | | Not made public | Not | Male | Col. Gen. | — |
| Chu Ui-sop | | Not made public | Not | Male | Civilian | — |
| Ham Won-chang | | Not made public | Not | Male | Civilian | — |
| Han An-su | | Not made public | Not | Male | Civilian | — |
| Han Chang-ku | | Not made public | Not | Male | Civilian | — |
| Han Chang-man | | Not made public | Not | Male | Civilian | — |
| Han Chan-ok | | Not made public | Not | Male | Civilian | — |
| Han Chong-song | | Not made public | Not | Male | Civilian | — |
| Han Hae-tong | | Not made public | Not | Male | Civilian | — |
| Han Hui-ho | | Not made public | Not | Male | Civilian | — |
| Han Hung-nam | | Not made public | Not | Male | Civilian | — |
| Han Ki-chang | | Not made public | Not | Male | Civilian | — |
| Han Kyu-chung | | Not made public | Not | Male | Civilian | — |
| Han Min-kun | | Not made public | Not | Male | Civilian | — |
| Han Nung-chae | | Not made public | Not | Male | Civilian | — |
| Han Pong-chin | | Not made public | Not | Male | Civilian | — |
| Han Pong-nyo | | Not made public | Not | Male | Civilian | — |
| Han Sang-kyu | | Not made public | Not | Male | Civilian | — |
| Han Sang-nyo | | Not made public | Not | Male | Civilian | — |
| Han Song-yong | | Not made public | Not | Male | Civilian | — |
| Han Sun-hui | | Not made public | Not | Male | Civilian | — |
| Han Tok-su | | Not made public | Not | Male | Civilian | — |
| Han Tong-wan | | Not made public | Not | Male | Civilian | — |
| Han Yong-ok | | Not made public | Not | Male | Maj. Gen. | — |
| Han Yun-chang | | Not made public | Not | Male | Civilian | — |
| Han Yun-kil | | Not made public | Not | Male | Civilian | — |
| Ho Chong-suk | | Not made public | Not | Female | Civilian | Standing Committee |
| Ho Kuk-song | | Not made public | Not | Male | Civilian | — |
| Ho Nam-ki | | Not made public | Not | Male | Civilian | — |
| Ho Nam-sun | | Old | Reelected | Male | Civilian | — |
| Ho Pok-tok | | Not made public | Not | Female | Civilian | — |
| Ho Tam | | Not made public | Not | Male | Civilian | — |
| Hong Chun-sil | | Not made public | Not | Male | Civilian | — |
| Hong Hwa-tu | | Not made public | Not | Male | Civilian | — |
| Hong Il-chon | | Not made public | Not | Female | Civilian | — |
| Hong Ki-mun | | Not made public | Not | Male | Civilian | Standing Committee |
| Hong Pom-kil | | Not made public | Not | Male | Civilian | — |
| Hong Si-hak | | Not made public | Not | Male | Civilian | — |
| Hong Si-kyon | | Not made public | Not | Male | Civilian | — |
| Hong Song-nam | | Not made public | Not | Male | Civilian | — |
| Hong Song-yong | | Not made public | Not | Male | Civilian | — |
| Hong Tuk-yong | | Not made public | Not | Male | Civilian | — |
| Hong Yong-ok | | Not made public | Not | Female | Civilian | — |
| Hwang Chang-yop | | Not made public | Not | Male | Civilian | Standing Committee |
| Hwang Ha-chong | | Not made public | Not | Male | Civilian | — |
| Hwang San-ho | | Not made public | Not | Male | Civilian | — |
| Hwang Sun-hui | | Not made public | Not | Female | Civilian | — |
| Hwang Sun-myong | | Not made public | Not | Male | Civilian | — |
| Hwang Yong-to | | Not made public | Not | Male | Civilian | — |
| Hyon Chol-kyu | | Not made public | Not | Male | Civilian | — |
| Hyon Chun-kuk | | Not made public | Not | Male | Civilian | — |
| Hyon Mu-kwang | | Not made public | Not | Male | Civilian | — |
| Hyon Ung-sil | | Not made public | Not | Male | Civilian | — |
| Hyon Yong-hui | | Not made public | Not | Male | Civilian | — |
| Im Nok-chae | | Not made public | Not | Male | Civilian | — |
| Kang Chom-ku | | Not made public | Not | Male | Civilian | — |
| Kang Chung-han | | Not made public | Not | Male | Civilian | — |
| Kang Ho-yong | | Not made public | Not | Male | Civilian | — |
| Kang Hui-won | | Not made public | Not | Male | Civilian | — |
| Kang Hui-yong | | Not made public | Not | Male | Civilian | — |
| Kang Hyon-su | | Not made public | Not | Male | Lt. Gen. | — |
| Kang Maeng-ku | | Not made public | Not | Male | Civilian | — |
| Kang Myong-ok | | Not made public | Not | Female | Civilian | — |
| Kang Pong-ok | | Not made public | Not | Male | Civilian | — |
| Kang Sok-sung | | Not made public | Not | Male | Civilian | — |
| Kang Song-san | | Not made public | Not | Male | Civilian | — |
| Kang Sung-hwan | | Not made public | Not | Male | Civilian | — |
| Kang Tok-su | | Not made public | Not | Male | Civilian | — |
| Kang Yong-suk | | Not made public | Not | Male | Civilian | — |
| Kang Yun-kun | | Not made public | Not | Male | Civilian | — |
| Ki Kyong-nyol | | Not made public | Not | Male | Civilian | — |
| Kil Chun-sik | | Not made public | Not | Male | Civilian | — |
| Kil Im | | Not made public | Not | Male | Civilian | — |
| Kil Ok-hyon | | Not made public | Not | Male | Civilian | — |
| Kim Chae-pong | | Not made public | Not | Male | Civilian | — |
| Kim Chae-yon | | Not made public | Not | Male | Civilian | — |
| Kim Chang-chol | | Not made public | Not | Male | Civilian | — |
| Kim Chang-chu | | Not made public | Not | Male | Civilian | — |
| Kim Chang-ho | | Not made public | Not | Male | Civilian | — |
| Kim Chang-ho | | Not made public | Not | Male | Civilian | — |
| Kim Chang-kuk | | Not made public | Not | Male | Civilian | — |
| Kim Chang-kyo | | Not made public | Not | Male | Civilian | — |
| Kim Chang-yun | | Not made public | Not | Male | Civilian | — |
| Kim Che-min | | Not made public | Not | Male | Civilian | — |
| Kim Chi-hang | | Not made public | Not | Male | Civilian | — |
| Kim Chi-hun | | Not made public | Not | Male | Civilian | — |
| Kim Chi-hyon | | Not made public | Not | Male | Civilian | — |
| Kim Chi-ku | | Not made public | Not | Male | Civilian | — |
| Kim Chin-hwa | | Not made public | Not | Male | Civilian | — |
| Kim Chin-son | | Not made public | Not | Male | Civilian | — |
| Kim Chin-suk | | Not made public | Not | Male | Civilian | — |
| Kim Chi-yong | | Not made public | Not | Male | Civilian | — |
| Kim Chol-won | | Not made public | Not | Male | Civilian | — |
| Kim Chong-ae | | Not made public | Not | Female | Civilian | — |
| Kim Chong-hui | | Not made public | Not | Female | Civilian | — |
| Kim Chong-il | | Not made public | Not | Male | Civilian | — |
| Kim Chong-kyun | | Not made public | Not | Male | Civilian | — |
| Kim Chong-sil | | Not made public | Not | Male | Civilian | — |
| Kim Chong-suk | | Not made public | Not | Female | Civilian | — |
| Kim Chong-wan | | Not made public | Not | Male | Civilian | — |
| Kim Chong-yon | | Not made public | Not | Male | Civilian | — |
| Kim Chung-il | | Not made public | Not | Male | Civilian | — |
| Kim Chung-nin | | Not made public | Not | Male | Civilian | — |
| Kim Chun-tae | | Not made public | Not | Male | Civilian | — |
| Kim Chu-yong | | Not made public | Not | Male | Civilian | — |
| Kim Hak-u | | Not made public | Not | Male | Civilian | — |
| Kim Hi-chun | | Not made public | Not | Male | Civilian | — |
| Kim Hoe-il | | Not made public | Not | Male | Civilian | — |
| Kim Ho-kyong | | Not made public | Not | Male | Civilian | — |
| Kim Ho-sop | | Not made public | Not | Male | Civilian | — |
| Kim Hui-sam | | Not made public | Not | Male | Civilian | — |
| Kim Hu-pun | | Not made public | Not | Male | Civilian | — |
| Kim Hwan | | Not made public | Not | Male | Civilian | — |
| Kim Hyong-chong | | Not made public | Not | Male | Civilian | — |
| Kim Hyong-ku | | Not made public | Not | Male | Civilian | — |
| Kim I-chang | | Not made public | Not | Male | Civilian | — |
| Kim Il | | Not made public | Not | Male | Civilian | — |
| Kim Il-chol | | Not made public | Not | Male | Lt. Gen. | — |
| Kim Il Sung | | Not made public | Not | Male | Marshal | — |
| Kim Il-dae | | Not made public | Not | Male | Civilian | Standing Committee |
| Kim Kang-hwan | | Not made public | Not | Male | Lt. Gen. | — |
| Kim Ki-ha | | Not made public | Not | Male | Civilian | — |
| Kim Ki-hwan | | Not made public | Not | Male | Civilian | — |
| Kim Kil-sam | | Not made public | Not | Male | Civilian | — |
| Kim Kil-tong | | Not made public | Not | Male | Civilian | — |
| Kim Ki-nam | | Not made public | Not | Male | Civilian | Standing Committee |
| Kim Ki-pom | | Not made public | Not | Male | Civilian | — |
| Kim Ki-son | | Not made public | Not | Male | Civilian | — |
| Kim Kuk-hun | | Not made public | Not | Male | Civilian | — |
| Kim Kuk-tae | | Not made public | Not | Male | Lt. Gen. | — |
| Kim Kum-ok | | Not made public | Not | Female | Civilian | — |
| Kim Kun-su | | Not made public | Not | Male | Civilian | — |
| Kim Kwang-chin | | Not made public | Not | Male | Lt. Gen. | — |
| Kim Kwang-chu | | Not made public | Not | Male | Civilian | — |
| Kim Kwan-sop | | Not made public | Not | Male | Civilian | Standing Committee |
| Kim Kye-hwa | | Not made public | Not | Male | Civilian | — |
| Kim Kyong-chan | | Not made public | Not | Male | Civilian | — |
| Kim Kyong-su | | Not made public | Not | Male | Civilian | — |
| Kim Kyong-suk | | Not made public | Not | Male | Civilian | — |
| Kim Kyong-yon | | Not made public | Not | Male | Civilian | — |
| Kim Kyong-yop | | Not made public | Not | Male | Civilian | — |
| Kim Man-gum | | Not made public | Not | Male | Civilian | — |
| Kim Nam-kyo | | Not made public | Not | Male | Civilian | — |
| Kim Ok-hyon | | Not made public | Not | Male | Civilian | — |
| Kim Ok-sim | | Not made public | Not | Male | Civilian | — |
| Kim Pil-hwan | | Not made public | Not | Male | Civilian | — |
| Kim Pok-sil | | Not made public | Not | Female | Civilian | — |
| Kim Pok-sin | | Not made public | Not | Female | Civilian | — |
| Kim Pong-chu | | Not made public | Not | Male | Civilian | Standing Committee |
| Kim Pong-kyu | | Not made public | Not | Male | Civilian | — |
| Kim Pong-yul | | Not made public | Not | Male | Col. Gen. | — |
| Kim Po-pi | | Not made public | Not | Female | Civilian | — |
| Kim Pung-chin | | Not made public | Not | Male | Civilian | — |
| Kim Pun-ok | | Not made public | Not | Female | Civilian | — |
| Kim Pyong-kil | | Not made public | Not | Male | Civilian | — |
| Kim Pyong-kon | | Not made public | Not | Male | Civilian | — |
| Kim Pyong-yul | | Not made public | Not | Male | Civilian | — |
| Kim Sang-in | | Not made public | Not | Male | Civilian | — |
| Kim Sang-nyon | | Not made public | Not | Male | Civilian | — |
| Kim Si-hak | | Not made public | Not | Male | Civilian | — |
| Kim Sok-hyon | | Not made public | Not | Male | Civilian | — |
| Kim Sok-hyong | | Not made public | Not | Male | Civilian | — |
| Kim Som-sang | | Not made public | Not | Male | Civilian | — |
| Kim Song-ae | | Not made public | Not | Female | Civilian | Standing Committee |
| Kim Song-chol | | Not made public | Not | Male | Civilian | — |
| Kim Song-hun | | Not made public | Not | Male | Civilian | — |
| Kim Song-ku | | Not made public | Not | Male | Civilian | — |
| Kim Song-kuk | | Not made public | Not | Male | V. Adm. | — |
| Kim Song-nyol | | Not made public | Not | Male | Civilian | — |
| Kim Song-yong | | Not made public | Not | Male | Civilian | — |
| Kim Son-hwa | | Not made public | Not | Male | Civilian | — |
| Kim Son-taek | | Not made public | Not | Male | Civilian | — |
| Kim Suk-nan | | Not made public | Not | Male | Civilian | — |
| Kim Sun-na | | Not made public | Not | Male | Civilian | — |
| Kim Sun-sil | | Not made public | Not | Male | Civilian | — |
| Kim Sun-yong | | Not made public | Not | Male | Civilian | — |
| Kim Taek-su | | Not made public | Not | Male | Civilian | — |
| Kim Tae-kuk | | Not made public | Not | Male | Civilian | — |
| Kim Tae-kyong | | Not made public | Not | Male | Civilian | — |
| Kim Taek-yong | | Not made public | Not | Male | Civilian | — |
| Kim Tae-nok | | Not made public | Not | Male | Civilian | — |
| Kim Tae-sop | | Not made public | Not | Male | Civilian | — |
| Kim Tae-yong | | Not made public | Not | Male | Civilian | — |
| Kim Tok-hwa | | Not made public | Not | Male | Civilian | — |
| Kim Tong-yon | | Not made public | Not | Male | Civilian | — |
| Kim Tu-nam | | Not made public | Not | Male | Civilian | — |
| Kim Tu-yong | | Not made public | Not | Male | Lt. Gen. | — |
| Kim U-chong | | Not made public | Not | Male | Civilian | — |
| Kim Ui-kol | | Not made public | Not | Male | Civilian | — |
| Kim Ji-suk | | Not made public | Not | Male | Civilian | — |
| Kim Ung-sang | | Not made public | Not | Male | Civilian | — |
| Kim Un-ha | | Not made public | Not | Male | Civilian | — |
| Kim Wol-son | | Not made public | Not | Male | Civilian | — |
| Kim Won-kon | | Not made public | Not | Male | Civilian | — |
| Kim Won-kyun | | Not made public | Not | Male | Civilian | — |
| Kim Yang-pu | | Not made public | Not | Male | Civilian | — |
| Kim Yong-chae | | Not made public | Not | Male | Civilian | — |
| Kim Yong-chan | | Not made public | Not | Male | Civilian | — |
| Kim Yong-chon | | Not made public | Not | Male | Civilian | — |
| Kim Yong-hyok | | Not made public | Not | Male | Civilian | — |
| Kim Yong-nam | | Not made public | Not | Male | Civilian | — |
| Kim Yong-nyon | | Not made public | Not | Male | Civilian | — |
| Kim Yong-ok | | Not made public | Not | Male | Civilian | — |
| Kim Yong-ok | | Not made public | Not | Male | Civilian | — |
| Kim Yong-pok | | Not made public | Not | Male | Civilian | — |
| Kim Yong-sam | | Not made public | Not | Male | Civilian | — |
| Kim Yong-son | | Not made public | Not | Male | Civilian | — |
| Kim Yong-sun | | Not made public | Not | Male | Civilian | — |
| Kim Yong-tae | | Not made public | Not | Male | Civilian | — |
| Kim Yong-taek | | Not made public | Not | Male | Civilian | — |
| Kim Yong-tuk | | Not made public | Not | Male | Civilian | — |
| Kim Yong-un | | Not made public | Not | Male | Civilian | — |
| Kim Yong-yon | | Not made public | Not | Male | Lt. Gen. | — |
| Kim Yun-hyok | | Not made public | Not | Male | Civilian | — |
| Kim Yu-sun | | Not made public | Not | Male | Civilian | — |
| Ko Chong-sik | | Not made public | Not | Male | Civilian | — |
| Ko Hak-chin | | Not made public | Not | Male | Civilian | — |
| Ko Kum-sun | | Not made public | Not | Male | Civilian | — |
| Ko Tae-pung | | Not made public | Not | Male | Civilian | — |
| Ko Un-chon | | Not made public | Not | Male | Civilian | — |
| Kong Chin-tae | | Not made public | Not | Male | Civilian | — |
| Ku Cha-hun | | Not made public | Not | Male | Civilian | — |
| Ku Il-son | | Not made public | Not | Male | Civilian | — |
| Kwak Sun-tok | | Not made public | Not | Female | Civilian | — |
| Kwak Tae-sam | | Not made public | Not | Male | Civilian | — |
| Kwon Hui-kyong | | Not made public | Not | Male | Civilian | — |
| Kwon Hyon-suk | | Not made public | Not | Male | Civilian | — |
| Kwon I-sun | | Not made public | Not | Male | Civilian | — |
| Kwon Sang-ho | | Not made public | Not | Male | Civilian | — |
| Kwon Sun-ok | | Not made public | Not | Male | Civilian | — |
| Kwon Yong-ok | | Not made public | Not | Male | Civilian | — |
| Kye Ung-tae | | Not made public | Not | Male | Civilian | — |
| Maeng Tae-ho | | Not made public | Not | Male | Civilian | — |
| Min Chol-ki | | Not made public | Not | Male | Civilian | — |
| Min Tong-ki | | Not made public | Not | Male | Civilian | — |
| Mun Chang-kuk | | Not made public | Not | Male | Civilian | — |
| Mun Tok-hwan | | Not made public | Not | Male | Civilian | — |
| Na Chong-hui | | Not made public | Not | Female | Civilian | — |
| Nam Chong-ki | | Not made public | Not | Male | Civilian | — |
| Nam Ki-hwan | | Not made public | Not | Male | Civilian | — |
| Nam Ok-nyo | | Not made public | Not | Female | Civilian | — |
| Nam Si-u | | Not made public | Not | Male | Civilian | — |
| Nam Sun-hui | | Not made public | Not | Male | Civilian | — |
| Nam Sun-hung | | Not made public | Not | Male | Civilian | — |
| Nam Tae-kuk | | Not made public | Not | Male | Civilian | — |
| No Chong-hui | | Not made public | Not | Male | Civilian | — |
| No Mun-yol | | Not made public | Not | Male | Civilian | — |
| No Myong-kun | | Not made public | Not | Male | Civilian | — |
| No Pok-hwa | | Not made public | Not | Male | Civilian | — |
| No Pyong-sik | | Not made public | Not | Male | Civilian | — |
| No Sa-pom | | Not made public | Not | Male | Civilian | — |
| No Tok-yon | | Not made public | Not | Male | Civilian | — |
| No Ui-hwa | | Not made public | Not | Male | Civilian | — |
| O Chae-won | | Not made public | Not | Male | Lt. Gen. | — |
| O Chin-u | | Not made public | Not | Male | General | — |
| O Chun-sim | | Not made public | Not | Male | Civilian | — |
| O Kuk-yol | | Not made public | Not | Male | Col. Gen. | — |
| O Paek-ryong | | Not made public | Not | Male | General | — |
| O Sang-nok | | Not made public | Not | Male | Civilian | — |
| O Tu-ik | | Not made public | Not | Male | Civilian | — |
| O Yong-pang | | Not made public | Not | Male | Civilian | — |
| Om Kil-son | | Not made public | Not | Male | Civilian | — |
| Paek Chang-yong | | Not made public | Not | Male | Civilian | — |
| Paek Chong-hun | | Not made public | Not | Male | Civilian | — |
| Paek Hak-nim | | Not made public | Not | Male | Lt. Gen. | — |
| Paek In-chun | | Not made public | Not | Male | Civilian | — |
| Paek Myong-suk | | Not made public | Not | Male | Civilian | — |
| Paek Pom-su | | Not made public | Not | Male | Lt. Gen. | — |
| Paek Sol | | Not made public | Not | Male | Civilian | — |
| Paek Sol-hui | | Not made public | Not | Female | Civilian | — |
| Pak Ae-son | | Not made public | Not | Male | Civilian | — |
| Pak Chae-yon | | Not made public | Not | Male | Civilian | — |
| Pak Chang-yong | | Not made public | Not | Male | Civilian | — |
| Pak Chi-su | | Not made public | Not | Male | Civilian | — |
| Pak Chong-hyon | | Not made public | Not | Female | Civilian | — |
| Pak Chong-su | | Not made public | Not | Male | Civilian | — |
| Pak Chung-kuk | | Not made public | Not | Male | Lt. Gen. | — |
| Pak Chun-myong | | Not made public | Not | Male | Civilian | — |
| Pak Ha-yong | | Not made public | Not | Male | Civilian | — |
| Pak Il-hwan | | Not made public | Not | Male | Civilian | — |
| Pak In-pin | | Not made public | Not | Male | Civilian | — |
| Pak Ki-so | | Not made public | Not | Male | Civilian | — |
| Pak Kwan-o | | Not made public | Not | Male | Civilian | — |
| Pak Kyong-ho | | Not made public | Not | Male | Civilian | — |
| Pak Kyong-hwan | | Not made public | Not | Male | Civilian | — |
| Pak Mun-chan | | Not made public | Not | Male | Civilian | — |
| Pak Myong-chun | | Not made public | Not | Male | Civilian | — |
| Pak Myong-pin | | Not made public | Not | Male | Civilian | — |
| Pak Pong-yong | | Not made public | Not | Male | Civilian | — |
| Pak Sam | | Not made public | Not | Male | Civilian | — |
| Pak Sang-yun | | Not made public | Not | Male | Civilian | — |
| Pak Song-chol | | Not made public | Not | Male | Civilian | — |
| Pak Song-ok | | Not made public | Not | Male | Civilian | — |
| Pak Song-sil | | Not made public | Not | Male | Civilian | — |
| Pak Song-won | | Not made public | Not | Male | Civilian | — |
| Pak Sung-il | | Not made public | Not | Male | Civilian | — |
| Pak Su-tong | | Not made public | Not | Male | Civilian | — |
| Pak Tae-hun | | Not made public | Not | Male | Civilian | — |
| Pak Tae-kap | | Not made public | Not | Male | Civilian | — |
| Pak Won-kuk | | Not made public | Not | Male | Civilian | — |
| Pak Yong-sok | | Not made public | Not | Male | Civilian | — |
| Pak Yong-sop | | Not made public | Not | Male | Civilian | — |
| Pak Yong-sun | | Not made public | Not | Male | Civilian | — |
| Pang Chol-kap | | Not made public | Not | Male | V. Adm. | — |
| Pang Chol-san | | Not made public | Not | Male | Civilian | — |
| Pang Hak-se | | Not made public | Not | Male | Civilian | — |
| Pang Ki-yong | | Not made public | Not | Male | Civilian | — |
| Pang Sung-ok | | Not made public | Not | Male | Civilian | — |
| Pang Tae-ho | | Not made public | Not | Male | Civilian | — |
| Pang Tae-uk | | Not made public | Not | Male | Civilian | — |
| Pang Yong-tong | | Not made public | Not | Male | Civilian | — |
| Pong Won-so | | Not made public | Not | Male | Civilian | — |
| Pyon Chang-pok | | Not made public | Not | Male | Civilian | — |
| Pyon Nam-hyon | | Not made public | Not | Male | Civilian | — |
| Pyon Sung-u | | Not made public | Not | Male | Civilian | — |
| Pyong Ung-hui | | Not made public | Not | Male | Civilian | — |
| Sim I-chang | | Not made public | Not | Male | Civilian | — |
| Sim Sang-nak | | Not made public | Not | Male | Civilian | — |
| Sin Chang-yol | | Not made public | Not | Male | Civilian | — |
| Sin Kum-yon | | Not made public | Not | Male | Civilian | — |
| Sin Kyong-sik | | Not made public | Not | Male | Civilian | — |
| Sin Sang-kyun | | Not made public | Not | Male | Civilian | — |
| Sin Song-u | | Not made public | Not | Male | Civilian | — |
| Sin Tae-kyun | | Not made public | Not | Male | Civilian | — |
| Sin Tong-hwi | | Not made public | Not | Male | Civilian | — |
| Sin Yong-tok | | Not made public | Not | Male | Civilian | — |
| Sin Yon-ok | | Not made public | Not | Male | Civilian | — |
| So Chae-hong | | Not made public | Not | Male | Civilian | — |
| So Chin-sok | | Not made public | Not | Male | Civilian | — |
| So Chol | | Not made public | Not | Male | General | — |
| So Kwang-hun | | Not made public | Not | Male | Civilian | — |
| So Kwan-hui | | Not made public | Not | Male | Civilian | — |
| So Myong-chun | | Not made public | Not | Male | Civilian | — |
| So Tong-nak | | Not made public | Not | Male | Civilian | — |
| So Yun-sok | | Not made public | Not | Male | Civilian | — |
| Son Song-pil | | Not made public | Not | Male | Civilian | Standing Committee |
| Son Yun-hung | | Not made public | Not | Male | Civilian | — |
| Song Son-hui | | Not made public | Not | Male | Civilian | — |
| Song Tae-yon | | Not made public | Not | Male | Civilian | — |
| Song Tong-sop | | Not made public | Not | Male | Civilian | — |
| Sonu Chon-il | | Not made public | Not | Male | Civilian | — |
| Sonu Pyong-ku | | Not made public | Not | Male | Civilian | — |
| Tae Pyong-yol | | Not made public | Not | Male | Lt. Gen. | — |
| Tong Sun-mo | | Not made public | Not | Male | Civilian | — |
| U Tal-ho | | Not made public | Not | Male | Civilian | — |
| U Tong-che | | Not made public | Not | Male | Civilian | — |
| Un Chol | | Not made public | Not | Male | Civilian | — |
| Won Chong-sam | | Not made public | Not | Male | Civilian | — |
| Won Su-pok | | Not made public | Not | Male | Civilian | — |
| Yang Hwa-song | | Not made public | Not | Female | Civilian | — |
| Yang Hyong-sop | | Not made public | Not | Male | Civilian | Standing Committee |
| Yang In-ho | | Not made public | Not | Male | Civilian | — |
| Yang In-kil | | Not made public | Not | Male | Civilian | — |
| Yang Myong-suk | | Not made public | Not | Male | Civilian | — |
| Yang Ok-nyo | | Not made public | Not | Female | Civilian | — |
| Yang Se-kon | | Not made public | Not | Male | Civilian | — |
| Yang Wang-pok | | Not made public | Not | Male | Civilian | — |
| Yang Yong-kyok | | Not made public | Not | Male | Civilian | — |
| Yi | | Not made public | Not | Male | Civilian | — |
| Yi Chae-yun | | Not made public | Not | Male | Civilian | — |
| Yi Chang-kil | | Not made public | Not | Male | Civilian | — |
| Yi Ch'ang-son | | Not made public | Not | Male | Civilian | — |
| Yi Chi-chan | | Not made public | Not | Male | Civilian | — |
| Yi Chin-kyu | | Not made public | Not | Male | Civilian | — |
| Yi Chin-su | | Not made public | Not | Male | Lt. Gen. | — |
| Yi Chong-chun | | Not made public | Not | Male | Civilian | — |
| Yi Chong-ho | | Not made public | Not | Male | Civilian | — |
| Yi Chong-in | | Not made public | Not | Male | Civilian | — |
| Yi Chong-kun | | Not made public | Not | Male | Civilian | — |
| Yi Chong-mok | | Not made public | Not | Male | Civilian | — |
| Yi Chong-ok | | Not made public | Not | Male | Civilian | — |
| Yi Chong-pom | | Not made public | Not | Male | Civilian | — |
| Yi Chong-su | | Not made public | Not | Male | Civilian | — |
| Yi Chong-sun | | Not made public | Not | Female | Civilian | — |
| Yi Chong-sun | | Not made public | Not | Male | Civilian | — |
| Yi Chong-u | | Not made public | Not | Male | Civilian | — |
| Yi Chung-song | | Not made public | Not | Male | Civilian | — |
| Yi Chun-hwa | | Not made public | Not | Male | Civilian | — |
| Yi Chun-pok | | Not made public | Not | Male | Civilian | — |
| Yi Chun-sim | | Not made public | Not | Male | Civilian | — |
| Yi Chun-son | | Not made public | Not | Male | Civilian | — |
| Yi Chun-song | | Not made public | Not | Male | Civilian | — |
| Yi Ha-il | | Not made public | Not | Male | Civilian | — |
| Yi Hak-chan | | Not made public | Not | Male | Civilian | — |
| Yi Ho-nim | | Not made public | Not | Male | Civilian | — |
| Hwa-sun | | Not made public | Not | Female | Civilian | — |
| Yi Hwa-yong | | Not made public | Not | Male | Maj. Gen. | — |
| Yi In-pok | | Not made public | Not | Male | Civilian | — |
| Yi In-tok | | Not made public | Not | Male | Civilian | — |
| Yi Kang-se | | Not made public | Not | Male | Civilian | — |
| Yi Kil-song | | Not made public | Not | Male | Lt. Gen. | — |
| Yi Kum-nyo | | Not made public | Not | Female | Civilian | — |
| Yi Kun-mo | | Not made public | Not | Male | Civilian | — |
| Yi Kwang-sil | | Not made public | Not | Male | Civilian | — |
| Yi Kwang-u | | Not made public | Not | Male | Civilian | — |
| Yi Kye-paek | | Not made public | Not | Male | Civilian | — |
| Yi Kye-san | | Not made public | Not | Male | Civilian | — |
| Yi Kyong-suk | | Not made public | Not | Female | Civilian | — |
| Yi Kyu-myong | | Not made public | Not | Male | Civilian | — |
| Yi Kyu-won | | Not made public | Not | Male | Civilian | — |
| Yi Man-hyong | | Not made public | Not | Male | Civilian | — |
| Yi Man-kol | | Not made public | Not | Male | Civilian | — |
| Yi Man-tae | | Not made public | Not | Male | Civilian | — |
| Yi Myong-chun | | Not made public | Not | Male | Civilian | — |
| Yi Myong-chun | | Not made public | Not | Male | Civilian | — |
| Yi Myong-suk | | Not made public | Not | Male | Civilian | — |
| Yi Myon-sang | | Not made public | Not | Male | Civilian | — |
| Yi Nak-pin | | Not made public | Not | Male | Civilian | — |
| Yi Ok-sun | | Not made public | Not | Male | Civilian | — |
| Yi O-song | | Not made public | Not | Male | Lt. Gen. | — |
| Yi Pil-sang | | Not made public | Not | Male | Civilian | — |
| Yi Pong-se | | Not made public | Not | Male | Civilian | — |
| Yi Pyong-kuk | | Not made public | Not | Male | Civilian | — |
| Yi Pyong-uk | | Not made public | Not | Male | Civilian | — |
| Yi Pyong-won | | Not made public | Not | Male | Civilian | — |
| Yi Pyong-yon | | Not made public | Not | Male | Civilian | — |
| Yi Sang-ik | | Not made public | Not | Male | Civilian | — |
| Yi Sin-cha | | Not made public | Not | Female | Civilian | — |
| Yi Sok | | Not made public | Not | Male | Civilian | — |
| Yi Sok-chin | | Not made public | Not | Male | Civilian | — |
| Yi Song-ho | | Not made public | Not | Male | Civilian | — |
| Yi Son-sil | | Not made public | Not | Male | Civilian | — |
| Yi Sung-hui | | Not made public | Not | Male | Civilian | — |
| Yi Sung-ki | | Not made public | Not | Male | Civilian | — |
| Yi Sung-kyu | | Not made public | Not | Male | Civilian | — |
| Yi Sun-im | | Old | Reelected | Female | Civilian | — |
| Yi Tan | | Not made public | Not | Male | Civilian | — |
| Yi Tong-chun | | Not made public | Not | Male | Civilian | — |
| Yi Tong-su | | Not made public | Not | Male | Civilian | — |
| Yi To-won | | Not made public | Not | Male | Civilian | — |
| Yi Tu-chan | | Not made public | Not | Male | Lt. Gen. | — |
| Yi Tu-il | | Not made public | Not | Male | Col. Gen. | — |
| Yi Tuk-sil | | Not made public | Not | Male | Civilian | — |
| Yi Ui-sun | | Not made public | Not | Male | Civilian | — |
| Yi Ul-sol | | Not made public | Not | Male | Col. Gen. | — |
| Yi Um-chon | | Not made public | Not | Female | Civilian | — |
| Yi Ung-won | | Not made public | Not | Male | Civilian | — |
| Yi Un-sun | | Not made public | Not | Female | Civilian | — |
| Yi Won-kwan | | Not made public | Not | Male | Civilian | — |
| Yi Won-ok | | Not made public | Not | Male | Civilian | — |
| Yi Ye-sik | | Not made public | Not | Male | Civilian | — |
| Yi Yong | | Not made public | Not | Male | Civilian | — |
| Yi Yong-ae | | Not made public | Not | Male | Civilian | — |
| Yi Yong-ho | | Not made public | Not | Male | Civilian | — |
| Yi Yong-ik | | Not made public | Not | Male | Lt. Gen. | Standing Committee |
| Yi Yong-kyun | | Not made public | Not | Male | Civilian | — |
| Yi Yong-pu | | Not made public | Not | Male | Civilian | — |
| Yi Yong-sik | | Not made public | Not | Male | Civilian | — |
| Yi Yong-su | | Not made public | Not | Male | Civilian | Standing Committee |
| Yim Chun-chu | | Not made public | Not | Male | Civilian | — |
| Yim Ho-kun | | Not made public | Not | Male | Civilian | — |
| Yim Hyong-ku | | Not made public | Not | Male | Civilian | — |
| Yim Ki-hwan | | Not made public | Not | Male | Civilian | — |
| Yim Kyong-mo | | Not made public | Not | Male | Civilian | — |
| Yim Su-man | | Not made public | Not | Male | Civilian | — |
| Yim Tok-un | | Not made public | Not | Male | Civilian | — |
| Yim Won-sam | | Not made public | Not | Male | Civilian | — |
| Yim Yun-sik | | Not made public | Not | Male | Civilian | — |
| Yo Chun-sok | | Not made public | Not | Male | Civilian | — |
| Yo Pyong-nam | | Not made public | Not | Male | Civilian | — |
| Yo Yon-ku | | Not made public | Not | Female | Civilian | Standing Committee |
| Yom Chae-man | | Not made public | Not | Male | Civilian | — |
| Yom Chong-suk | | Not made public | Not | Male | Civilian | — |
| Yom Chun-un | | Not made public | Not | Male | Civilian | — |
| Yom Kuk-yol | | Not made public | Not | Male | Civilian | — |
| Yon Hyong-muk | | Not made public | Not | Male | Civilian | — |
| Yu Chong-hyon | | Not made public | Not | Male | Civilian | — |
| Yu Chong-yang | | Not made public | Not | Male | Civilian | — |
| Yu Ch'un-ok | | Not made public | Not | Female | Civilian | — |
| Yu Hyong-num | | Not made public | Not | Male | Civilian | — |
| Yu Hyong-su | | Not made public | Not | Male | Civilian | — |
| Yu Kwae-chin | | Not made public | Not | Male | Civilian | — |
| Yu Kye-chin | | Not made public | Not | Male | Civilian | — |
| Yu Kyu-tong | | Not made public | Not | Male | Civilian | — |
| Yu Pyong-nyon | | Not made public | Not | Male | Civilian | — |
| Yu Pyong-ok | | Not made public | Not | Male | Civilian | — |
| Yu Sang-kol | | Not made public | Not | Male | Civilian | — |
| Yu Suk-kun | | Not made public | Not | Male | Civilian | — |
| Yu Yong-sok | | Not made public | Not | Male | Civilian | — |
| Yun Ae-sun | | Not made public | Not | Male | Civilian | — |
| Yun In-hyon | | Not made public | Not | Male | Civilian | — |
| Yun Ki-chong | | Not made public | Not | Female | Civilian | — |
| Yun Ki-pok | | Not made public | Not | Male | Civilian | — |
| Yun Myong-kun | | Not made public | Not | Male | Civilian | — |
| Yun Pyong-kwon | | Not made public | Not | Male | Civilian | — |
| Yun So | | Not made public | Not | Male | Civilian | — |
| Yun Sung-kwan | | Not made public | Not | Male | Civilian | — |
