= 5th Supreme People's Assembly =

- Sign of the Supreme People's Assembly

25 December 1972 – 17 December 1977 (4 years, 357 days) Overview
- Type: Session of the Supreme People's Assembly
- Election: 12 December 1972

Leadership
- Chairman: Hwang Jang-yop
- Vice Chairmen: Hong Ki-mun; Ho Jong-suk

Members
- Total: 541 deputies

The 5th Supreme People's Assembly (SPA) was elected on 12 December 1972 and convened for its first session on 25–28 December 1972. It was replaced on 17 December 1977 by the 6th Supreme People's Assembly.

== Meetings ==
Meeting	Start–end	Length	Session agenda
1st Session	25–28 December 1972	4 days	8 items: 1. On the socialist constitution of North Korea.; 1. Opening remarks by Choe Yong-gon.; 2. Report by Kim Il Sung, known as "Let Us Strengthen the Socialist System of Our Country".; 3. Reading by Kim Il on the draft proposal of a new North Korean constitution.; 4. Debate on the draft constitution by Pak Song-chol, Han Ik-su, Yang Hyong-sop, Jong Jun-gi, Ho Tam, Yun Ki-bok, Pak Sin-dok, Pak Hun, Yang Sun-do and Hwang Jang-yop.; 5. Debate on Kim Il-sung's report by Kim Chung-nin, Chong Chun-taek, Kang Yang-uk, Ho Jong-suk, Yi Sung-gi, Pyon Chang-bok, Choe Ik-kyu, Yi Yong-bok, Kang Song-san, Kim Pok-sin, Son Song-pil, Pak Chun-sik, Yi Cha-son, Kim Sok-hwa, Pak Pok-sun and Kim Sok-hyong.; 2. Election of officials to central state organisations; 1. Report by Kim Tong-gyu on behalf of the 5th Credentials Committee.; 2. Election of the President of North Korea; 1. Kim Il nominates Kim Il-sung.; 1. Nomination discussed by O Jin-u, Yom Tae-jun, Kim I-hun and Kim Tuk-nan.; 1. Kim Il-sung elected; 3. Election of the vice presidents of North Korea; 4. Election of members to the Central People's Committee; 5. Election of the Chairman of the Standing Committee of the Supreme People's Assembly; 6. Election of the Vice Chairs of the Standing Committee of the Supreme People's Assembly; 7. Election of members of the 5th Standing Committee; 8. Election of the Premier of the Administrative Council; 9. Election of the Vice Premier of the Administrative Council; 10. Election of the Vice Chairman of the National Defense Commission; 11. Election of the Chairman of the Auditing Committee of the Supreme People's Assembly; 12. Election of the Vice Chairman of the Auditing Committee of the Supreme People's Assembly; 13. Election of the Chief Justice of the Supreme Court; 14. Appointment of Chief Procurator of the Central Procurator's Office;
2nd Session	5–10 April 1973	6 days	1 item
3rd Session	20–25 March 1974	6 days	1 item
4th Session	27–30 November 1974	4 days	1 item
5th Session	8–10 April 1975	3 days	2 items
6th Session	27–29 April 1976	3 days	2 items
7th Session	26–29 April 1977	4 days	2 items

== Officers ==
=== Chairman ===
Name	Took office	Left office	Duration
Hwang Jang-yop	25 December 1972	17 December 1977	4 years and 357 days

=== Vice Chairman ===
Rank	Name	Took office	Left office	Duration
1	Hong Ki-mun	25 December 1972	17 December 1977	4 years and 357 days
2	Ho Jong-suk	25 December 1972	17 December 1977	4 years and 357 days

== Deputies ==
Listing	Name	4th SPA	6th SPA	Membership
1	Yi Myong-je	New	Not made public	—
2	Ko Yun-suk	New	Not made public	—
3	Yi Yong-mu	New	Not made public	—
4	Kim Chol-man	Old	Not made public	—
5	Kim Chang-chol	New	Not made public	—
6	Kim Pyong-ha	New	Not made public	Central People's Committee; Administrative Council
7	Kim Sang-jin	Old	Not made public	—
8	Kim Ki-ha	New	Not made public	—
9	Na Chong-hui	New	Not made public	—
10	Cho Sok-ku	New	Not made public	—
11	Kang Song-san	New	Not made public	Standing Committee
12	Kang Cho-han	New	Not made public	—
13	Yi Myong-won	Old	Not made public	—
14	Tae Pyong-yol	Old	Not made public	—
15	Kim Yong-gol	New	Not made public	—
16	Yi Chun-sil	New	Not made public	—
17	Yi Cha-son	New	Not made public	—
18	Yang Sun-do	New	Not made public	—
19	Chang Kil-yong	New	Not made public	—
20	Yi Ung-won	New	Not made public	—
21	Pang Tae-ho	New	Not made public	—
22	Yang Yong-gon	New	Not made public	—
23	Yi Chin-su	New	Not made public	—
24	Kim Hui-in	New	Not made public	—
25	Yim Nok-chae	New	Not made public	—
26	Hwang Chi-ryop	New	Not made public	—
27	Yun Pyong-gwon	Old	Not made public	—
28	Yi Kum-ok	New	Not made public	—
29	Yi Tu-chan	Old	New	Standing Committee
30	Kim Tae-ho	Old	Not made public	—
31	Pak Nam-sun	Old	Not made public	—
32	Pak Pok-sun	Old	Not made public	—
33	Kang Hui-won	Old	Not made public	—
34	Kim Myong-sik	New	Not made public	—
35	Paek Hak-nim	Old	Not made public	—
36	Yi Chun-hui	New	Not made public	—
37	Kim Chong-sun	New	Not made public	—
38	Yom Chong-ja	New	Not made public	—
39	Kim Pyong-sik	Old	Not made public	—
40	So Kwan-hui	Old	Not made public	Bills Committee
41	Hong Hak-kun	New	Not made public	—
42	Yim Chol	New	Not made public	—
43	Sin Yong-sik	Old	Not made public	—
44	Hwang Myong-gyu	New	Not made public	—
45	Kim Chong-hwan	New	Not made public	—
46	Ho Pok-tok	New	Not made public	—
47	Kwon Tae-hup	New	Not made public	—
48	Yu Suk-kun	New	Not made public	—
49	Yun Chun-dok	New	Not made public	—
50	Choe Ik-kyu	New	Not made public	—
51	Han An-su	New	Not made public	—
52	Kim Song-yun	New	Not made public	—
53	Yi Se-sik	New	Not made public	—
54	Chong Hwa-sop	New	Not made public	—
55	Hong Song-mu	New	Not made public	—
56	Choe Su-san	New	Not made public	—
57	Pak Se-bong	New	Not made public	—
58	Yi Hwa-son	New	Not made public	—
59	Jon Mun-sop	Old	Not made public	—
60	Yi Sin-ja	New	Not made public	—
61	Kim Sun-yong	New	Not made public	—
62	Om Kil-yong	New	Not made public	—
63	Kim Kyong-suk	New	Not made public	—
64	Ho Ryon-suk	New	Not made public	—
65	Yang In-gil	New	Not made public	—
66	Yi Sang-hyon	New	Not made public	—
67	Kim Song-yul	New	Not made public	—
68	Kim Song-ok	New	Not made public	—
69	Sin Su-gun	New	Not made public	Bills Committee
70	Han Se-gyong	New	Not made public	—
71	Cho Chun-sam	Old	Not made public	—
72	Kim Ki-son	Old	Not made public	—
73	Ho Dam	New	Not made public	Central People's Committee; Administrative Council
74	Hwang Chae-son	Old	Not made public	—
75	So Chol	Old	Not made public	Standing Committee
76	Yi Chu-sok	New	Not made public	—
77	Kye Hyong-sun	New	Not made public	—
78	Kye Chun-yong	Old	Not made public	—
79	Na Chong-sil	New	Not made public	—
80	Cho Se-ung	New	Not made public	—
81	O Rye-son	New	Not made public	—
82	Pyon Chang-bok	New	Not made public	—
83	Pak In-su	New	Not made public	—
84	Kim Kum-san	New	Not made public	—
85	O Chae-won	Old	Not made public	—
86	Yu Rak-chong	Old	Not made public	—
87	Yim Yun-sik	Old	Not made public	—
88	Kye Ung-tae	Old	Not made public	Administrative Council
89	Kim Hak-sun	New	Not made public	—
90	Kim Sok-hyong	New	Not made public	—
91	Kim Rak-hui	Old	Not made public	—
92	Yi Kye-baek	Old	Not made public	—
93	No Chong-hui	New	Not made public	—
94	Kim Chi-ryong	New	Not made public	—
95	Yi Kwan-son	New	Not made public	—
96	Yom Tae-jun	New	Not made public	Standing Committee
97	Om Hak-chol	New	Not made public	—
98	An Chang-se	New	Not made public	—
99	Chang Yun-pil	Old	Not made public	—
100	Choe Hyon-suk	New	Not made public	—
101	Choe Chang-do	Old	Not made public	—
102	Kim Chin-do	New	Not made public	—
103	Choe Sung-guk	New	Not made public	—
104	Kim Won-ok	New	Not made public	—
105	Choe Yong-suk	New	Not made public	—
106	Pang Chang-se	New	Not made public	—
107	Kim Tuk-nan	Old	Not made public	—
108	Kim Chang-jun	Old	Not made public	—
109	Chong Tong-chol	Old	Not made public	Budget Committee
110	Yi Kyong-suk	New	Not made public	—
111	Hong Nae-gun	Old	Not made public	—
112	Yi Yong-suk	Old	Not made public	—
113	Yun Ki-bok	New	Not made public	Standing Committee; Budget Committee
114	Kim Ung-sam	New	Not made public	—
115	Yi Yong-bu	New	Not made public	—
116	Cho Mi-ri	New	Not made public	—
117	Kim Po-bi	New	Not made public	—
118	Chu Kil-sun	New	Not made public	—
119	Han Pong-nyo	New	Not made public	—
120	Chin Pyong-mu	New	Not made public	—
121	Yi Yong-gu	Old	Not made public	—
122	Kim Pong-sun	New	Not made public	—
123	Choe Yong-gun	New	Not made public	—
124	Kim Chang-ju	Old	Not made public	—
125	Kim Won-gon	New	Not made public	—
126	Yang In-ho	New	Not made public	—
127	Chi Kyong-su	New	Not made public	—
128	Han Yun-chang	New	Not made public	—
129	No Myong-gun	New	Not made public	—
130	Choe Yong-jon	New	Not made public	—
131	Yang Pok-won	New	Not made public	—
132	Kim Pyong-bin	New	Not made public	—
133	Yang Hyong-sop	Old	Not made public	Central People's Committee
134	Yun Tae-in	New	Not made public	—
135	Choe Hyon	Old	Not made public	Central People's Committee; Administrative Council; National Defense Commission
136	Kim Sung-jo	New	Not made public	—
137	Kim Ok-nyo	New	Not made public	—
138	Kim Hak-san	New	Not made public	—
139	Pak Tong-son	New	Not made public	—
140	Hwang Jang-yop	New	Not made public	Standing Committee
141	Kim Chun-do	New	Not made public	—
142	Yi Ki-yong	Old	Not made public	—
143	Son Kyong-hwa	New	Not made public	—
144	Kim Kuk-hun	Old	Not made public	—
145	Kim Chong-song	New	Not made public	—
146	Ri Kun-mo	Old	Not made public	Central People's Committee
147	Kim Se-yun	New	Not made public	—
148	Choe Chun-gil	New	Not made public	—
149	Kim Yong-chae	Old	Not made public	—
150	Kim Yong-jon	New	Not made public	—
151	Pak Chong-i	New	Not made public	—
152	Chon Chang-chol	Old	Not made public	Standing Committee
153	Yi Kuk-kwon	Old	Not made public	—
154	Kim Pil-chu	New	Not made public	—
155	Pak Kwan-o	New	Not made public	—
156	Pak Chong-hyon	Old	Not made public	—
157	Pak Im-tae	New	Not made public	Administrative Council
158	Yi Sok-chun	New	Not made public	—
159	No Tae-sok	New	Not made public	—
160	Han Chong-gi	Old	Not made public	—
161	Kim Yong-wol	New	Not made public	—
162	Hong Ki-mun	New	Not made public	Standing Committee
163	O Hyon-ju	Old	Not made public	Standing Committee
164	Hwang Sun-sin	New	Not made public	—
165	Kim Tok-won	New	Not made public	—
166	Yi O-song	New	Not made public	—
167	Chon Se-bong	New	Not made public	Standing Committee
168	Kwon Yong-u	Old	Not made public	—
169	Kim Song-gol	New	Not made public	—
170	Yi Sil-ok	New	Not made public	—
171	Han Chan-ok	Old	Not made public	—
172	Pak Won-ha	New	Not made public	—
173	Chong Yun-gil	New	Not made public	—
174	Choe Chin-song	New	Not made public	—
175	Kang Pong-gun	New	Not made public	—
176	Chang Il-gyong	Old	Not made public	—
177	Kim Sok-ha	New	Not made public	—
178	Yi Rak-bin	Old	Not made public	—
179	Ho Tong-su	New	Not made public	—
180	Kim Tok-yong	New	Not made public	—
181	Chang Chi-suk	New	Not made public	—
182	Choe Sil-tan	New	Not made public	—
183	Hyon Chun-guk	New	Not made public	—
184	Kong Chin-tae	New	Not made public	Administrative Council
185	Pak Yong-nyo	New	Not made public	—
186	Kim Sung-won	New	Not made public	—
187	Yi Yong-bok	New	Not made public	Standing Committee
188	Kim Chong-hui	New	Not made public	—
189	Chong Kwang-yon	New	Not made public	—
190	Kang Yong-suk	New	Not made public	—
191	Choe Nam-hyang	New	Not made public	—
192	O Tae-bong	Old	Not made public	Central People's Committee; Bills Committee
193	Chang Son-sik	New	Not made public	—
194	Kim Kyong-myong	New	Not made public	—
195	Kim Kwan-sop	New	Not made public	—
196	Kim Pong-son	New	Not made public	—
197	Son Song-pil	New	Not made public	—
198	Yi Won-sop	New	Not made public	—
199	Na Yong-su	New	Not made public	—
200	Hong Won-gil	New	Not made public	Central People's Committee; Administrative Council
201	Cho Yong-suk	New	Not made public	—
202	Yi Kum-nyo	Old	Not made public	—
203	Paek Wol-son	New	Not made public	—
204	Kim Pyong-yul	New	Not made public	Budget Committee
205	Kim Hi-jun	New	Not made public	—
206	Yang Nak-kyong	New	Not made public	—
207	Pak Song-chol	Old	Not made public	Central People's Committee; Administrative Council
208	Ko Kum-sun	Old	Not made public	—
209	Sonu Pyong-gu	New	Not made public	—
210	Chong Kwan-chol	New	Not made public	—
211	Paek Ui-myong	Old	Not made public	—
212	O Kuk-yol	Old	Not made public	—
213	Kim In-song	New	Not made public	—
214	Chang Chong-yop	New	Not made public	—
215	Kim Si-hak	New	Not made public	—
216	Kim Il Sung	Old	Not made public	Central People's Committee; National Defense Commission
217	An Yong-bok	New	Not made public	—
218	Song Chun-ok	New	Not made public	—
219	Yun Ho-sok	New	Not made public	—
220	Yi Pong-gil	New	Not made public	Budget Committee
221	Kim Chi-ung	New	Not made public	—
222	Han Yong-bo	New	Not made public	—
223	Han Song-yong	New	Not made public	Administrative Council
224	Choe Chong-yong	New	Not made public	—
225	Kil Chung-sung	New	Not made public	—
226	Kim Sok-cho	New	Not made public	—
227	Chon Pyong-chae	New	Not made public	—
228	Yu Pyong-no	New	Not made public	—
229	Kim Won-chong	New	Not made public	—
230	Chon Hi-yong	New	Not made public	—
231	Yang Ok-nyo	New	Not made public	—
232	Kim Un-ha	Old	Not made public	—
233	Yim Pong-chun	New	Not made public	—
234	Kim Kwang-bong	New	Not made public	—
235	Yi Yong-son	Old	Not made public	—
236	Chong Kum-sok	New	Not made public	—
237	Choe Pyong-ho	New	Not made public	—
238	Pak Hun-won	New	Not made public	—
239	Chang Ho-sam	New	Not made public	—
240	Pang Hwan-son	New	Not made public	—
241	Kim Yong-nam	New	Not made public	Standing Committee
242	Choe Sang-yol	New	Not made public	—
243	Kim Ni-jun	New	Not made public	—
244	Nam Ok-nyo	New	Not made public	—
245	Pak Yong-sop	New	Not made public	—
246	Paek Sang-su	New	Not made public	—
247	Pang Hyo-ul	New	Not made public	—
248	Kim Song-jol	New	Not made public	—
249	Kim Wal-su	New	Not made public	—
250	Kang Yang-uk	Old	Not made public	Central People's Committee
251	Yi Kil-song	New	Not made public	Bills Committee
252	Kim Won-sam	New	Not made public	—
253	Kim Chi-se	New	Not made public	—
254	Ri Jong-ok	Old	Not made public	Central People's Committee; Administrative Council
255	Yang Chong-go	New	Not made public	—
256	Kim Son-jun	New	Not made public	—
257	Kim Hak-bom	New	Not made public	—
258	Kim Mun-hyon	New	Not made public	—
259	Yim Chun-chu	New	Not made public	Central People's Committee
260	Choe Rye-hwan	New	Not made public	—
261	Wi Kwi-hwan	New	Not made public	—
262	Han Tae-son	New	Not made public	—
263	Pak Hak-sop	New	Not made public	—
264	Chong Chun-taek	Old	Not made public	Central People's Committee; Administrative Council
265	Yi Kye-hwan	Old	Not made public	—
266	Pak Cho-ryon	New	Not made public	—
267	Yun Chin-sang	New	Not made public	—
268	Nam Kum-bong	New	Not made public	—
269	Pang Tae-uk	New	Not made public	—
270	Kim Chong-hoe	New	Not made public	—
271	Yi Yon-suk	New	Not made public	—
272	Hyon Chol-gyu	New	Not made public	—
273	Kim Kil-hyon	New	Not made public	—
274	Kim Pung-jin	New	Not made public	—
275	Kim Nak-sop	New	Not made public	—
276	Cho Chin-suk	New	Not made public	—
277	Kim Chae-ryu	New	Not made public	—
278	Han Hae-dong	New	Not made public	—
279	Yi Tong-jun	New	Not made public	—
280	An Yong-u	New	Not made public	—
281	Kang Tae-sop	New	Not made public	—
282	Choe Chun-yong	New	Not made public	—
283	Han Ik-su	New	Not made public	Standing Committee
284	Kim Hyong-su	New	Not made public	—
285	Kang Sok-sung	New	Not made public	—
286	Choe Chae-hyop	New	Not made public	—
287	Chong Chi-ryong	Old	Not made public	—
288	Ho Paek-san	New	Not made public	—
289	Kim Hak-su	New	Not made public	—
290	Choe Hyon-gi	New	Not made public	—
291	Cho Chang-suk	New	Not made public	—
292	Chon Yong-chun	New	Not made public	—
293	Kim Hak-chol	New	Not made public	—
294	Kim Yong-ju	Old	Not made public	Central People's Committee
295	To Sun-mo	New	Not made public	—
296	Pak Si-hyong	New	Not made public	—
297	Yi Sun-yol	New	Not made public	—
298	Chu To-il	Old	Not made public	—
299	Choe Kum-san	Old	Not made public	—
300	Chin Mun-dok	Old	Not made public	—
301	Kim Yun-son	Old	Not made public	—
302	Kim Pun-ok	New	Not made public	—
303	Chong Kyong-sik	New	Not made public	—
304	Yi Tong-chun	New	Not made public	—
305	Ho Chung-ok	New	Not made public	—
306	Kim Tae-ryong	New	Not made public	—
307	Hwang Sun-hui	Old	Not made public	—
308	Kwon Hui-gyong	New	Not made public	—
309	Kim Chae-ha	New	Not made public	—
310	Kim Tuk-su	New	Not made public	—
311	Kim Hyong-sam	New	Not made public	—
312	Kim Yong-ho	Old	Not made public	—
313	Choe Chung-san	New	Not made public	—
314	Ko Hak-chon	New	Not made public	—
315	Kim Il	Old	Not made public	Central People's Committee; Administrative Council
316	Paek Won-bom	New	Not made public	—
317	Yi Hui-gol	New	Not made public	—
318	Han Tok-su	Old	Not made public	—
319	Yu Hyong-num	New	Not made public	—
320	Chon Han-gyo	New	Not made public	—
321	Pak Chun-myong	New	Not made public	—
322	Choe Chil-gap	New	Not made public	—
323	Ko Min-sun	Old	Not made public	—
324	Ho Se-uk	New	Not made public	—
325	Hyon Mu-gwang	New	Not made public	Central People's Committee; Administrative Council
326	Ho Yong-ik	New	Not made public	—
327	Chin Sang-gi	New	Not made public	—
328	Kim Tong-son	New	Not made public	—
329	Yu Su-hong	New	Not made public	—
330	Song Kwan-jo	Old	Not made public	—
331	Ri Sung-gi	Old	Not made public	—
332	Kwon Yun-il	Old	Not made public	—
333	Choe Yong-jin	Old	Not made public	—
334	Ho Jong-suk	New	Not made public	Standing Committee
335	Yi Yon	Old	Not made public	—
336	Han Sok-chin	New	Not made public	Budget Committee
337	Yi Chang-do	New	Not made public	—
338	Pak Yong-sun	Old	Not made public	—
339	Pak Yong-son	New	Not made public	—
340	Kim Sok-yong	Old	Not made public	—
341	Kim Chong-pil	Old	Not made public	—
342	Kang Maeng-gu	Old	Not made public	—
343	Yi Won-gwan	New	Not made public	—
344	Yi Yong-sun	Old	Not made public	—
345	Kim Se-bong	New	Not made public	—
346	Chong Song-nam	New	Not made public	—
347	Kim Sin-sik	New	Not made public	—
348	Pak Yong-sik	New	Not made public	—
349	Yi Yang-hun	New	Not made public	—
350	Yi Sun-ho	New	Not made public	—
351	Mun Suk-cha	Old	Not made public	—
352	Kim Yun-sang	New	Not made public	Administrative Council
353	Ko Chun-myong	New	Not made public	—
354	Chu Song-il	Old	Not made public	—
355	Kim Yi-sok	New	Not made public	—
356	Song Pok-ki	New	Not made public	—
357	O Jin-u	Old	Not made public	Central People's Committee; National Defense Commission
358	Han Hyong-hwan	New	Not made public	—
359	Han Ki-il	New	Not made public	—
360	Sok Sun-hui	New	Not made public	—
361	Chon Cha-ryon	Old	Not made public	—
362	Pak Nak-ho	New	Not made public	—
363	Pan Il-byong	New	Not made public	Bills Committee
364	Yu Kwi-jin	New	Not made public	—
365	Yu Kum-son	New	Not made public	—
366	Chong Hui-chol	Old	Not made public	—
367	Sin Song-u	New	Not made public	—
368	Kim Pok-sin	New	Not made public	—
369	Sin Po-gyun	Old	Not made public	—
370	Cho Myong-son	New	Not made public	—
371	Kim Ung-sang	New	Not made public	—
372	Kang Myon-su	New	Not made public	—
373	Han Hubang-nyo	Old	Not made public	—
374	Kim Oin-nam	Old	Not made public	—
375	Kim Ki-bong	New	Not made public	—
376	Han Hui-ho	New	Not made public	—
377	Yi Chong-u	New	Not made public	—
378	Yi Chun-ho	New	Not made public	—
379	Yi Chae-yun	Old	Not made public	—
380	An Suk-yong	Old	Not made public	—
381	Yi Myong-sang	New	Not made public	Standing Committee
382	Kang Hak-su	New	Not made public	—
383	Yi Kum-son	New	Not made public	—
384	Choe Chung-guk	Old	Not made public	—
385	Chon Kum-son	New	Not made public	—
386	Yi Pong-gyu	New	Not made public	—
387	Kim Won-chan	Old	Not made public	—
388	Min Kwan-bom	New	Not made public	—
389	Kim Kyong-chan	New	Not made public	—
390	Kim Kyu-sun	Old	Not made public	—
391	No Se-bom	New	Not made public	—
392	Yu Chang-sik	New	Not made public	Central People's Committee
393	Choe Yong-gu	New	Not made public	—
394	Yi Chang-son	New	Not made public	Administrative Council
395	An Tal-sil	New	Not made public	—
396	Kim Tong-gyu	Old	Not made public	Central People's Committee; Credentials Committee
397	Won Hong-chol	New	Not made public	—
398	Kim Kwang-ju	New	Not made public	—
399	Kim Pyong-chon	New	Not made public	—
400	Paek Il-bu	New	Not made public	—
401	Paek Sun-ok	New	Not made public	—
402	Yi Yong-gyu	New	Not made public	—
403	Yu Chun-ok	New	Not made public	—
404	O Paek-ryong	Old	Not made public	National Defense Commission
405	Chang Chong-hwan	Old	Not made public	—
406	Yi Un-sun	New	Not made public	—
407	Song Ki-hwan	New	Not made public	—
408	Nam Il	Old	Not made public	Central People's Committee; Administrative Council
409	Hwang Yong-do	New	Not made public	—
410	Yi Chin-gyu	Old	Not made public	—
411	Yi Hwa-yong	New	Not made public	—
412	Chi Kun-su	New	Not made public	—
413	Choe Chung-son	Old	Not made public	—
414	Sin Chung-son	New	Not made public	—
415	Pak Chung-guk	New	Not made public	—
416	Kim Su-duk	New	Not made public	—
417	Chang Chae-gak	New	Not made public	—
418	Cha Kye-ryong	New	Not made public	—
419	Choe In-dok	Old	Not made public	—
420	Hong Pong-su	New	Not made public	—
421	Han Pong-sol	New	Not made public	—
422	Pak Tong-gwan	Old	Not made public	—
423	Pyon Sung-u	New	Not made public	—
424	Ri Ul-sol	Old	Not made public	—
425	Yi Kye-san	Old	Not made public	—
426	Chi Pyong-hak	Old	Not made public	—
427	Kwon Chom-du	Old	Not made public	—
428	Hong Si-hak	Old	Not made public	—
429	Cho Sun-baek	New	Not made public	—
430	Pang Hak-se	Old	Not made public	Budget Committee
431	Yun Chi-ho	New	Not made public	—
432	Kim Chae-bong	Old	Not made public	—
433	Yi Wan-gi	New	Not made public	—
434	Choe Man-guk	Old	Not made public	—
435	Yi Chun-song	New	Not made public	—
436	Kang Myong-ok	New	Not made public	—
437	Yi Chang-chun	New	Not made public	—
438	Yun Chil-hwan	New	Not made public	—
439	Yi Yong-ik	New	Not made public	—
440	Sin Chong-suk	New	Not made public	—
441	Cho Tong-su	New	Not made public	—
442	Kim Chae-yon	New	Not made public	—
443	Pak Wal-song	New	Not made public	—
444	Wi Hak-sil	New	Not made public	—
445	Han Chi-sop	New	Not made public	—
446	Kim Kyong-yon	New	Not made public	Administrative Council
447	Yi Tu-ik	Old	Not made public	—
448	Kim Kwang-jin	New	Not made public	—
449	Yi Pang-gun	Old	Not made public	Bills Committee
450	O Sun-nyo	Old	Not made public	—
451	Kim Chun-gil	New	Not made public	—
452	Pak Yong-su	Old	Not made public	—
453	Yi Man-gol	New	Not made public	—
454	Kim Tong-hwan	Old	Not made public	—
455	Won Ha-ok	New	Not made public	—
456	Choe Sun-nam	Old	Not made public	—
457	Yu Chong-yol	New	Not made public	—
458	Yon Hyong-muk	Old	Not made public	Central People's Committee
459	Chin Chang-hu	New	Not made public	—
460	No U-ryong	New	Not made public	—
461	Yi Chan-hwa	Old	Not made public	—
462	Choe Chae-u	Old	Not made public	Central People's Committee; Administrative Council
463	Yon Song-yol	New	Not made public	—
464	Yi Chan-duk	New	Not made public	—
465	So Kyong-sil	New	Not made public	—
466	Kim Kwang-jin	New	Not made public	—
467	Kim Song-ae	New	Not made public	Standing Committee
468	Yi Chong-il	New	Not made public	—
469	Yi Tal-yong	Old	Not made public	—
470	Chu Sang-su	Old	Not made public	—
471	Kim Chung-nyo	New	Not made public	—
472	Ko Chang-nam	Old	Not made public	—
473	Yi Ye-dong	Old	Not made public	—
474	Kang Uk-kuk	Old	Not made public	—
475	Jong Jun-gi	New	Not made public	Standing Committee
476	Yim Sun-nyo	Old	Not made public	—
477	Pak Chun-sik	New	Not made public	Budget Committee
478	Kim I-hun	New	Not made public	Standing Committee
479	Yi In-bok	New	Not made public	—
480	Yi Pong-se	New	Not made public	—
481	So Yun-sok	New	Not made public	—
482	Han Kyong-suk	New	Not made public	—
483	Choe Yong-gon	Old	Not made public	Central People's Committee
484	Pae Chang-ho	New	Not made public	—
485	O Taek-hwan	Old	Not made public	—
486	Pak Sin-dok	Old	Not made public	Standing Committee
487	Pang Tae-yul	New	Not made public	—
488	Yi Um-jon	New	Not made public	—
489	Kim Taek-yong	New	Not made public	—
490	Chong Ki-ryong	New	Not made public	—
491	Kim Chung-nin	Old	Not made public	Central People's Committee
492	Han Yong-ok	New	Not made public	—
493	Yi Chae-gon	New	Not made public	—
494	Pak Song-sam	New	Not made public	—
495	O Song-guk	New	Not made public	—
496	Kim Kyong-in	New	Not made public	—
497	Yi Kun-song	Old	Not made public	—
498	O Pyong-dok	Old	Not made public	—
499	Kim Tae-hui	New	Not made public	—
500	Chong Chae-pil	New	Not made public	—
501	Chu Sung-nam	New	Not made public	—
502	Yi Hong-un	New	Not made public	—
503	Chong Yong-taek	New	Not made public	—
504	Kim Ok-sun	Old	Not made public	—
505	Pak Su-dong	New	Not made public	—
506	Choe Yol-hui	New	Not made public	—
507	An Tal-su	Old	Not made public	—
508	Kim Son-uk	Old	Not made public	—
509	Sin Kyong-sik	New	Not made public	—
510	No Ki-son	New	Not made public	—
511	Kim Ik-hyon	New	Not made public	—
512	Yi Sun-bong	New	Not made public	—
513	Ku Cha-hun	Old	Not made public	—
514	Chang Tong-sun	New	Not made public	—
515	Chi Kum-ju	New	Not made public	—
516	Kim Hu-bun	New	Not made public	—
517	Yim Nam-jae	New	Not made public	—
518	Choe Chi-son	New	Not made public	—
519	Hwang Won-nam	Old	Not made public	—
520	Chong Tae-hwang	New	Not made public	—
521	Kim Man-gum	Old	Not made public	Central People's Committee; Administrative Council
522	Yi Sun-ae	New	Not made public	—
523	Yun Sung-gwan	New	Not made public	—
524	Yi Sang-ik	New	Not made public	—
525	Sin Sang-gyun	New	Not made public	—
526	Yi Sok-chin	New	Not made public	—
527	Kim Sang-ho	New	Not made public	—
528	Chon Pil-yo	Old	Not made public	—
529	Chong Tu-hwan	Old	Not made public	Administrative Council
530	Yi Pong-won	New	Not made public	Bills Committee
531	Yi Song-sun	New	Not made public	—
532	Kim Yong-jun	New	Not made public	—
533	Chon No-hyong	Old	Not made public	—
534	Choe Yong-rim	New	Not made public	—
535	Paek Nam-un	Old	Not made public	—
536	Chang In-sok	New	Not made public	—
537	Kim Pong-yul	Old	Not made public	—
538	Choe Won-ik	New	Not made public	—
539	Han Chang-man	New	Not made public	—
540	Kim Yong-taek	Old	Not made public	—
541	Yi Chang-sun	Old	Not made public	—
