= 5th Standing Committee of the Supreme People's Assembly =

5th Standing Committee
- Sign of the Supreme People's Assembly

28 December 1972 – 17 December 1977 (4 years, 354 days) Overview
- Type: Standing Committee of the Supreme People's Assembly
- Election: 1st Session of the 5th Supreme People's Assembly

Leadership
- Chairman: Hwang Chang-yop
- Vice Chairmen: Hong Ki-mun; Ho Chong-suk
- Secretary-General: Chong Chang-chol

Members
- Total: 15

The 5th Standing Committee of the Supreme People's Assembly (SPA) was elected by the 1st Session of the 5th Supreme People's Assembly on 28 December 1972. It was replaced on 17 December 1977 by the 6th SPA Standing Committee.

== Members ==
| Rank | Name | Hangul | 4th STC | 6th STC | Positions |
|---|---|---|---|---|---|
| 1 | Hwang Chang-yop | 황장엽 | New | Reelected | Chairman of the Standing Committee of the Supreme People's Assembly |
| 2 | Hong Ki-mun | 홍기문 | New | Reelected | Vice Chairman of the Standing Committee of the Supreme People's Assembly |
| 3 | Ho Chong-suk | 허정숙 | New | Reelected | Vice Chair of the Standing Committee of the Supreme People's Assembly |
| 4 | So Chol | 서철 | New | Demoted | — |
| 5 | Han Ik-su | 한익수 | New | Demoted | — |
| 6 | Chon Chang-chol | 전창철 | New | Reelected | Secretary-General of the Standing Committee of the Supreme People's Assembly |
| 7 | Pak Sin-dok | 박신독 | Old | Demoted | — |
| 8 | Kim Yong-nam | 김영남 | New | Reelected | — |
| 9 | Chong Chun-gi | 종 춘기 | New | Demoted | — |
| 10 | Yom Tae-jun | 염태준 | New | Demoted | — |
| 11 | Kim Song-ae | 김성애 | New | Reelected | — |
| 12 | Kim I-hun | 김이훈 | New | Demoted | — |
| 13 | Yi Yong-bok | 이용복 | New | Demoted | — |
| 14 | Yun Ki-bok | 윤기복 | New | Reelected | — |
| 15 | Yi Tu-chan | 이투찬 | New | Demoted | — |
| 16 | Kang Song-san | 강성산 | New | Demoted | — |
| 17 | O Hyon-ju | 오현주 | New | Demoted | — |
| 18 | Chon Se-bong | 전세봉 | New | Reelected | — |
| 19 | Yi Myong-sang | 이명상 | New | Demoted | — |
