= Committees of the 9th Supreme People's Assembly =

North Korean government committees

9th Committees
- Sign of the Supreme People's Assembly

26 May 1990 – 6 September 1998 (8 years, 103 days) Overview
- Type: Bills Committee; Budget Committee; Foreign Affairs Committee; Qualifications Committee
- Election: 1st Session of the 9th Supreme People's Assembly

Leadership
- Chairman: Yang Hyong-sop
- Vice Chairmen: Paek In-chun; Yo Yong-ku
- Secretary-General: Yi Mong-ho

Members
- Total: 15

The committees of the 9th Supreme People's Assembly (9th SPA) were elected by the 1st Session of the 9th SPA on 26 May 1990. They were replaced on 6 September 1998 by the committees of the 10th Supreme People's Assembly.

== Members ==
=== Bills Committee ===
Rank	Name	Hangul	8th COM	10th COM	Positions
1	Kye Ung-tae		Old	?	Chairman of the Bills Committee
2	Paek Hak-nim		Old	?	—
—	Choe Su-ho		New	?	—
—	Choe Su-san		New	?	—
—	Han Sang-kyu		Old	?	—
—	Pak Kwan-o		New	?	—
—	Pang Hak-se		Old	Dead	—

=== Budget Committee ===
Rank	Name	Hangul	8th COM	10th COM	Positions
1	Pak Nam-ki		Old	?	Chairman of the Budget Committee
2	Chae Hui-chong		New	?	Vice Chairman of the Budget Committee
—	Kim Chi-hang		New	?	—
—	Yi Yong-kyon		New	?	—
—	Yim Ki-hwan		New	?	—
—	Yim Nok-chae		New	?	—
—	Yu Kyu-tong		New	?	—

=== Foreign Affairs Committee ===
Rank	Name	Hangul	8th COM	10th COM	Positions
1	Ho Dam		New	Dead	Chairman of the Foreign Affairs Committee
2	Chong Chun-ki		New	?	Vice Chairman of the Foreign Affairs Committee
2	Kang Sok-chu		New	?	Vice Chairman of the Foreign Affairs Committee
2	Kim Yong-ho		New	?	Vice Chairman of the Foreign Affairs Committee
2	Kim Yong-sun		New	?	Vice Chairman of the Foreign Affairs Committee
—	Choe Hyon-tok		New	?	—
—	Han Si-hae		New	?	—
—	Hwang Pyong-tae		New	?	—
—	Kim Chol-myong		New	?	—
—	Ko Ki-chun		New	?	—
—	Yi Hyon-ho		New	?	—
—	Yi Tong-chol		New	?	—
—	Yo Pong-ku		New	?	—

=== Reunification Policy Deliberation Committee ===
Rank	Name	Hangul	8th COM	10th COM	Positions
1	Yun Ki-pok		New	?	Chairman of the Reunification Policy Deliberation Committee
2	Han Yong-su		New	?	—
2	Kang Pyong-hak		New	?	—
—	An Pyong-su		New	?	—
—	Chon Kum-chol		New	?	—
—	Kang Yong-sop		New	?	—
—	Pak Tae-ho		New	?	—
—	Yim Chun-kil		New	?	—
—	Yu Ho-chun		New	?	—

=== Qualifications Screening Committee ===
Rank	Name	Hangul	8th COM	10th COM	Positions
1	Kim Chung-nin		New	?	Chairman of the Qualifications Screening Committee
2	Chang Song-ho		New	?	—
—	Kim Yong-chae		New	?	—
—	Kim Yong-ho		New	?	—
—	Yi Pong-won		New	?	—
—	Yi Tong-chol		New	?	—
—	Yo Pong-ku		New	?	—
