= Jong Jun-gi =

North Korean politician (1924–2007)

- 정준기

Vice Premier of North Korea

Personal details
- Born: 1924
- Died: 26 June 2007 (aged 82–83)
- Citizenship: North Korean
- Education: Kim Il Sung University
- Occupation: Politician

Jong Jun-gi (Korean: 정준기; 1924–2007) was a North Korean politician who held various positions in the North Korean government including as Vice Premier of North Korea.

== Biography ==
He was born in September 1924. He attended Soongsil Middle School in Pyongyang, then dropped out. After liberation, he studied at Kim Il Sung University and then studied at the Department of Political Economy at Moscow State University in 1950. He returned to Korea in 1953 and was assigned to the leadership of the Propaganda and Agitation Department, and in 1954, he was assigned to the position of section chief of the Propaganda and Agitation Department. After the August faction incident, he fiercely condemned Choi Chang-ik and Park Chang-ok, earning Kim Il Sung's trust, and in January 1962, he rose to the position of deputy director of the Propaganda and Agitation Department. In April 1963, he was appointed chief editor of the Rodong Sinmun, the main mouthpiece of the Workers' Party of Korea, and in February 1964, he became the central chairman of the Korean Journalists' Union and the president of the Korean Workers' Party Publishing House. In October 1966, he was elected to the executive branch of the 2nd Party Conference, and in November 1970, he was elected a member of the Central Committee at the 5th Party Congress. He played a significant role in the field of diplomacy, including serving as chairman of the North Korea-Indonesia Friendship Association in September 1965, the North Korea-North Vietnam Friendship Association in September 1965, and the North Korea-Peru Friendship Association in October 1972. In December 1972, he was elected as a deputy and member of the Standing Committee of the 5th Supreme People's Assembly, and on September 20, 1973, he was appointed Deputy Premier of the Administrative Council in accordance with the Decree of the Central People's Committee. In October 1973, he was by-elected as a candidate member of the Political Committee, and in April 1977, he succeeded Kang Hyon-su as chairman of the Pyongyang City People's Committee. In November 1977, he was elected as a deputy to the 6th Supreme People's Assembly and remained as vice premier in the 6th Administrative Council. In 1978, he handed over the position of People's Chairman of Pyongyang City to Kim Man-gum. In 1982, he was again elected a deputy to the 7th Supreme People's Assembly. In August 1987, he served as a member of the funeral committee of Pak Yong-sun. In 1986 he was appointed again. In 1994, he was a member of committee which organized the funeral of Kim Il Sung.
