= 5th Central People's Committee =

- State Emblem of North Korea

12 December 1972 – 15 December 1977 (5 years, 3 days) Overview
- Type: Session of the Central People's Committee
- Election: 1st Session of the 5th Supreme People's Assembly

Leadership
- President: Kim Il Sung
- Secretary-General: Yim Chun-chu

Members
- Total: 25

The 5th Central People's Committee (CPC) of North Korea was elected by the 1st Session of the 5th Supreme People's Assembly on 28 December 1972. It was replaced on 17 December 1977 by the 6th CPC.

== Members ==
Rank	Name	Birth	Death	Hangul	6th CPC	Positions
1	Kim Il Sung	1912	1994	김일성	Reelected	President of the Republic
2	Choe Yong-gon	1900	1976	최용건	Dead	Vice President of the Republic
3	Kang Yang-uk	1904	1983	강량욱	Reelected	Vice President of the Republic
4	Kim Il	1910	1984	김일	Reelected	—
5	Pak Song-chol	1913	2008	박성철	Reelected	—
6	Choe Hyon	1907	1982	최현	Reelected	—
7	O Jin-u	1917	1995	오진우	Demoted	—
8	Kim Tong-gyu	1915	1978	김동규	Demoted	—
9	Kim Yong-ju	1920	—	김영주	Demoted	—
10	Kim Chung-nin	1923	2010	김중린	Demoted	—
11	Hyon Mu-gwang	1913	1992	현무광	Demoted	—
12	Yang Hyong-sop	1925	—	양형섭	Demoted	—
13	Chong Chun-taek			종춘택	Dead	—
14	Kim Man-gum			김만검	Reelected	—
15	Yi Kun-mo	1926	2001	리근모	Reelected	—
16	Choe Chae-u			최채우	Demoted	—
17	Yi Chong-bok			이종복	Reelected	—
18	Yim Chun-chu	1912	1988	임춘추	Reelected	Secretary-General of the Central People's Committee
19	Yon Hyong-muk	1931	2005	연형묵	Demoted	—
20	O Tae-bong			오태봉	Demoted	—
21	Nam Il	1915	1976	남일	Dead	—
22	Hong Won-gil			홍원길	Dead	—
23	Yu Chang-sik			홍원길	Demoted	—
24	Ho Tam	1929	1991	허담	Demoted	—
25	Kim Pyong-ha			김평하	Demoted	—
