= 6th Administrative Council of North Korea =

6th Administrative Council
- State Emblem

26 December 1972 – 16 December 1977 (4 years, 355 days) Overview
- Type: Plenary Meeting of the Cabinet of North Korea
- Election: 1st Session of the 6th Supreme People's Assembly
- Secretary: Kim Tu-yong

The 6th Administrative Council of North Korea was elected by the 1st Session of the 6th Supreme People's Assembly on 16 December 1977. It was replaced on 5 April 1982 by the 7th Administrative Council.

== Members ==
Rank	Office	Name	Hangul	Took office	Left office	Duration	5th ADC	7th ADC
1	Premier of the Administrative Council	Ri Jong-ok		16 December 1977	5 April 1982	4 years and 110 days	Old	Reelected
2	Vice Premier of the Administrative Council	Kye Ung-tae		16 December 1977	5 April 1982	4 years and 110 days	New	?
2	Vice Premier of the Administrative Council	Ho Dam		16 December 1977	5 April 1982	4 years and 110 days	Old	?
2	Vice Premier of the Administrative Council	Chong Chun-gi		16 December 1977	5 April 1982	4 years and 110 days	New	?
2	Vice Premier of the Administrative Council	Kang Song-san		16 December 1977	5 April 1982	4 years and 110 days	New	?
2	Vice Premier of the Administrative Council	Kong Chin-tae		16 December 1977	5 April 1982	4 years and 110 days	New	?
2	Vice Premier of the Administrative Council	Kim Tu-yong		16 December 1977	5 April 1982	4 years and 110 days	New	?
3	Secretary of the Administrative Council	Kim Hun-hyok		16 December 1977	5 April 1982	4 years and 110 days	New	?
4	Ministry of the People's Armed Forces	O Jin-u		16 December 1977	5 April 1982	4 years and 110 days	New	?
5	Ministry of Foreign Affairs	Ho Dam		16 December 1977	5 April 1982	4 years and 110 days	Old	?
6	Ministry of Public Security	Choe Won-ik		16 December 1977	5 April 1982	4 years and 110 days	New	?
7	Chairman of the State Planning Commission	Hong Song-yong		16 December 1977	5 April 1982	4 years and 110 days	New	?
8	Chairman of the Agricultural Commission	So Kwan-hui		16 December 1977	5 April 1982	4 years and 110 days	New	?
9	Chairman of the Mining Industry Commission	Cho Chang-dok		16 December 1977	5 April 1982	4 years and 110 days	New	?
10	Minister of Metal Industry	Yun Ho-sok		16 December 1977	5 April 1982	4 years and 110 days	New	?
11	Minister of Power Industry	Yi Chi-chan		16 December 1977	5 April 1982	4 years and 110 days	New	?
12	Minister of Machine Industry	Kye Hyong-sun		16 December 1977	5 April 1982	4 years and 110 days	New	?
13	Minister of Chemical Industry	Won Tong-gu		16 December 1977	5 April 1982	4 years and 110 days	New	?
14	Minister of Construction	Pak Im-tae	박임태	16 December 1977	5 April 1982	4 years and 110 days	Old	?
15	Chairman of the State Construction Commission	Kim Ung-sang		16 December 1977	5 April 1982	4 years and 110 days	New	?
16	Minister of Building Materials Industry	Kim Nam-yun		16 December 1977	5 April 1982	4 years and 110 days	New	?
17	Minister of Light Industry	Ho Sun		16 December 1977	5 April 1982	4 years and 110 days	New	?
18	Minister of Railways	Pak Yong-sok		16 December 1977	5 April 1982	4 years and 110 days	New	?
19	Minister of Land and Sea Transportation	Yi Chol-bong		16 December 1977	5 April 1982	4 years and 110 days	New	?
20	Minister of Fisheries	Kim Yun-sang		16 December 1977	5 April 1982	4 years and 110 days	Old	?
21	Chairman of the People's Service Commission	Yim Hyong-gu		16 December 1977	5 April 1982	4 years and 110 days	New	?
22	Chairman of the Education Commission	Kim Il-dae		16 December 1977	5 April 1982	4 years and 110 days	New	?
23	Minister of Materials Supply	Kim Tae-guk		16 December 1977	5 April 1982	4 years and 110 days	New	?
24	Minister of Communications	Kim Yong-chae		16 December 1977	5 April 1982	4 years and 110 days	New	?
25	Minister of Culture and Arts	Yi Chang-son		16 December 1977	5 April 1982	4 years and 110 days	Old	?
26	Minister of Finance	Kim Kyong-yon		16 December 1977	5 April 1982	4 years and 110 days	Old	?
27	Minister of Foreign Trade	Kye Ung-tae		16 December 1977	5 April 1982	4 years and 110 days	Old	?
28	Minister of External Economic Affairs	Kong Chin-tae		16 December 1977	5 April 1982	4 years and 110 days	Old	?
29	Minister of Labour Administration	Chae Hui-jong		16 December 1977	5 April 1982	4 years and 110 days	New	?
30	Chairman of the State Scientific and Technological Commission	Chu Hwa-jong		16 December 1977	5 April 1982	4 years and 110 days	New	?
31	Minister of Public Health	Pak Myong-bin		16 December 1977	5 April 1982	4 years and 110 days	New	?
