= 7th Standing Committee of the Supreme People's Assembly =

7th Standing Committee
- Sign of the Supreme People's Assembly

5 April 1982 – 30 December 1986 (4 years, 269 days) Overview
- Type: Standing Committee of the Supreme People's Assembly
- Election: 1st Session of the 7th Supreme People's Assembly

Leadership
- Chairman: Yang Hyong-sop; Hwang Chang-yop
- Vice Chairmen: Ho Chong-suk; Hong Ki-mun
- Secretary-General: Kim I-hun

Members
- Total: 15

The 7th Standing Committee of the Supreme People's Assembly (SPA) was elected by the 1st Session of the 7th Supreme People's Assembly on 5 April 1982. It was replaced on 30 December 1986 by the 8th SPA Standing Committee.

== Officers ==
=== Chairman ===
Name	Hangul	Took office	Left office	Duration
Hwang Jang-yop	황장엽	5 April 1982	7 April 1983	1 year and 2 days
Yang Hyong-sop	양형섭	7 April 1983	30 December 1986	3 years and 267 days

=== Vice Chairman ===
Name	Hangul	Took office	Left office	Duration
Ho Chong-suk	정자	5 April 1982	7 April 1983	1 year and 2 days
Hong Ki-mun	홍기문	5 April 1982	7 April 1983	1 year and 2 days
Son Song-pil	손송필	7 April 1983	30 December 1986	3 years and 267 days
Yo Yong-ku	요용구	7 April 1983	30 December 1986	3 years and 267 days

=== Secretary ===
Name	Hangul	Took office	Left office	Duration
Kim I-hun	김이훈	5 April 1982	25 January 1984	1 year and 295 days
Kim Pong-chu	김퐁추	25 January 1984	30 December 1986	2 years and 339 days

== Members ==
Rank	Name	Hangul	6th STC	8th STC	Positions
1	Hwang Chang-yop	황장엽	Old	Demoted	Chairman of the Standing Committee of the Supreme People's Assembly
2	Ho Chong-suk	정자	Old	Demoted	Vice Chairman of the Standing Committee of the Supreme People's Assembly
3	Hong Ki-mun	홍기문	Old	Demoted	Vice Chairman of the Standing Committee of the Supreme People's Assembly
4	Kim I-hun	김이훈	New	Demoted	Secretary of the Standing Committee of the Supreme People's Assembly
5	Chong Tong-chol	종통철	Old	Demoted	—
6	Kim Kwan-sop	김관섭	Old	Demoted	—
7	Kim Ki-nam	김기남	Old	Demoted	—
8	Yi Yong-ik	이용익	Old	Demoted	—
9	Yom Tae-chun	염태천	New	Reelected	—
10	Chong Tu-hwan	종투환	New	Reelected	—
11	Yi Yong-su	이용수	New	Demoted	—
12	Kim Pong-ju	김퐁추	Old	Demoted	—
13	Kim Song-ae	김성애	Old	Reelected	—
14	Son Song-pil	손송필	Old	Reelected	—
15	Chon Se-bong	전세퐁	Old	Demoted	—

== Replacements ==
Officeholder		Replacement		By		8th STC
Name	Hangul	Name	Hangul	Date	Session	8th STC
Hwang Chang-yop	황장엽	Yang Hyong-sop	양형섭	7 April 1983	2nd	Reelected
Ho Chong-suk	정자	Son Song-pil	손송필	7 April 1983	2nd	Reelected
Hong Ki-mun	홍기문	Yo Yong-ku	요용구	7 April 1983	2nd	Reelected
Kim I-hun	김이훈	Kim Pong-chu	김퐁추	25 January 1984	3rd	Reelected
