= 5th Administrative Council of North Korea =

5th Administrative Council
- State Emblem

26 December 1972 – 16 December 1977 (4 years, 355 days) Overview
- Type: Plenary Meeting of the Cabinet of North Korea
- Election: 1st Session of the 5th Supreme People's Assembly

The 5th Administrative Council of North Korea was elected by the 1st Session of the 5th Supreme People's Assembly on 26 December 1972. It was replaced on 16 December 1977 by the 6th Administrative Council.

== Members ==
Rank	Office	Name	Hangul	Took office	Left office	Duration	4th CAB	6th ADC
1	Premier of the Administrative Council	Kim Il	김일	26 December 1972	19 April 1976	3 years and 115 days	Old	Promoted
1	Premier of the Administrative Council	Pak Song-chol	박성철	19 April 1976	16 December 1977	1 year and 241 days	Old	Not
2	Vice Premier of the Administrative Council	Pak Song-chol	박성철	26 December 1972	16 December 1977	4 years and 355 days	Old	Not
2	Vice Premier of the Administrative Council	Chong Chun-taek	정준택	26 December 1972	16 December 1977	4 years and 355 days	Old	Not
2	Vice Premier of the Administrative Council	Kim Man-gum	김만검	26 December 1972	16 December 1977	4 years and 355 days	Old	Not
2	Vice Premier of the Administrative Council	Choe Chae-u	최채우	26 December 1972	16 December 1977	4 years and 355 days	Old	Not
2	Vice Premier of the Administrative Council	Nam Il	남일	26 December 1972	7 March 1976	3 years and 72 days	Old	Dead
2	Vice Premier of the Administrative Council	Hong Won-gil	홍원길	26 December 1972	16 December 1977	4 years and 355 days	Old	Not
3	Chairman of the State Planning Commission	Choe Chae-u	최채우	26 December 1972	16 December 1977	4 years and 355 days	Old	Not
4	Minister of the People's Armed Forces	Choe Hyon	최현	26 December 1972	16 December 1977	4 years and 355 days	New	Not
5	Minister of Foreign Affairs	Ho Dam	허담	26 December 1972	16 December 1977	4 years and 355 days	New	Reelected
6	Minister of Public Security	Kim Pyong-ha	김평하	26 December 1972	16 December 1977	4 years and 355 days	New	Not
7	Chairman of the Heavy Industry Commission	Ri Jong-ok	리종옥	26 December 1972	16 December 1977	4 years and 355 days	Old	Reelected
8	Chairman of the Machine Industry Commission	Hong Won-gil	홍원길	26 December 1972	16 December 1977	4 years and 355 days	Old	Not
9	Minister of Ship Machine Building Industrsy	Han Song-yong	한성룡	26 December 1972	16 December 1977	4 years and 355 days	New	Not
10	Minister of Chemical Industry	Kim Hwan	김환	26 December 1972	16 December 1977	4 years and 355 days	New	Not
11	Chairman of the Light Industry Commission	Nam Il	남일	26 December 1972	7 March 1976	3 years and 72 days	Old	Dead
12	Chairman of the Agricultural Commission	Kim Man-gum	김만검	26 December 1972	16 December 1977	4 years and 355 days	Old	Not
13	Chairman of the Transportation and Communications Commission	Hyon Mu-gwang	현무광	26 December 1972	16 December 1977	4 years and 355 days	Old	Not
14	Minister of Fisheries	Kim Yun-sang	김윤상	26 December 1972	16 December 1977	4 years and 355 days	New	Reelected
15	Minister of Building Materials Industry	Mun Pyong-il	문평일	26 December 1972	16 December 1977	4 years and 355 days	New	Not
16	Chairman of the People's Service Commission	Pak Song-chol	박성철	26 December 1972	16 December 1977	4 years and 355 days	Old	Not
17	Minister of Education	Kim Sok-ki	김석기	26 December 1972	16 December 1977	4 years and 355 days	New	Not
18	Minister of Culture and Arts	Yi Chang-son	이창손	26 December 1972	16 December 1977	4 years and 355 days	New	Reelected
19	Minister of Finance	Kim Kyong-yon	김경연	26 December 1972	16 December 1977	4 years and 355 days	Old	Reelected
20	Minister of Foreign Trade	Kye Ung-tae	계웅태	26 December 1972	16 December 1977	4 years and 355 days	Old	Reelected
21	Minister of External Economic Affairs	Kong Chin-tae	공진태	26 December 1972	16 December 1977	4 years and 355 days	New	Reelected
22	Minister of Construction	Pak Im-tae	박임태	26 December 1972	16 December 1977	4 years and 355 days	New	Reelected
23	Minister of Labour Administration	Chong Tu-hwan	종투환	26 December 1972	16 December 1977	4 years and 355 days	New	Not
24	Minister of Public Health	Yi Nak-bin	이낙빈	26 December 1972	16 December 1977	4 years and 355 days	Old	Not
