= Committees of the 7th Supreme People's Assembly =

North Korean government committees

7th Committees
- Sign of the Supreme People's Assembly

5 April 1982 – 30 December 1986 (4 years, 269 days) Overview
- Type: Bills Committee; Budget Committee; Credentials Committee; National Defence Commission
- Election: 1st Session of the 7th Supreme People's Assembly

The committees of the 7th Supreme People's Assembly (SPA) of North Korea were elected by the 1st Session of the aforementioned body on 5 April 1982. It was replaced on 30 December 1986 by the committees of the 8th Supreme People's Assembly.

== Committees ==
=== Bills ===
Rank	Name	Hangul	6th COM	8th COM	Positions
1	Yun Ki-bok	윤기복	Old	Demoted	Chairman of the SPA Bills Committee
2	An Sung-hak	안성학	New	Demoted	—
3	Han Sang-kyu	한상규	New	Reelected	—
4	Kim Song-yong	김송용	New	Demoted	—
5	Pak Su-tong	박수통	New	Demoted	—
6	Pang Hak-se	방학세	Old	Reelected	—
7	Yi Chin-su	이진수	Old	Demoted	—

=== Budget ===
Rank	Name	Hangul	6th COM	8th COM	Positions
1	Kim Hwan	김환	New	Demoted	Chairman of the SPA Budget Committee
2	Chang Yun-pil	장윤필	New	Demoted	—
3	Hong Song-nam	홍성남	New	Demoted	—
4	Kim Chang-chu	김창추	New	Reelected	—
5	Maeng Tae-ho	맹태호	New	Demoted	—
6	Pak Sung-il	박성일	New	Reelected	—
7	Yi Chun-song	이춘송	New	Demoted	—

=== Credentials ===
Rank	Name	Hangul	6th COM	8th COM	Positions
1	Yim Chun-chu	임춘추	Old	Reelected	Chairman of the SPA Credentials Committee
2	Cho Se-ung	조승	New	Demoted	—
3	Kim Man-gum	김만금	New	Demoted	—
4	Pyon Chang-pok	표창폭	New	Demoted	—
5	So Chol	서철	New	Reelected	—
6	Yi Chi-chan	이치찬	New	Demoted	—
7	Yi Pyong-won	이평원	New	Reelected	—
