= 6th Standing Committee of the Supreme People's Assembly =

6th Standing Committee
- Sign of the Supreme People's Assembly

17 December 1977 – 5 April 1982 (4 years, 109 days) Overview
- Type: Standing Committee of the Supreme People's Assembly
- Election: 1st Session of the 6th Supreme People's Assembly

Leadership
- Chairman: Hwang Chang-yop
- Vice Chairmen: Ho Chong-suk; Hong Ki-mun
- Secretary-General: Chong Chang-chol

Members
- Total: 15

The 6th Standing Committee of the Supreme People's Assembly (SPA) was elected by the 1st Session of the 6th Supreme People's Assembly on 17 December 1977. It was replaced on 5 April 1982 by the 7th SPA Standing Committee.

== Members ==
Rank	Name	Hangul	5th STC	7th STC	Positions
1	Hwang Chang-yop	황장엽	Old	Reelected	Chairman of the Standing Committee of the Supreme People's Assembly
2	Ho Chong-suk	허정숙	Old	Reelected	Vice Chair of the Standing Committee of the Supreme People's Assembly
3	Hong Ki-mun	홍기문	Old	Reelected	Vice Chairman of the Standing Committee of the Supreme People's Assembly
4	Chon Chang-chol	전창철	Old	Demoted	Secretary-General of the Standing Committee of the Supreme People's Assembly
5	Kim Yong-nam	김영남	Old	Demoted	—
6	Chong Tong-chol	전창철	New	Reelected	—
7	Yun Ki-bok	윤기복	Old	Demoted	—
8	Kim Kwan-sop	김관섭	New	Reelected	—
9	Kim Ki-nam	김기남	New	Reelected	—
10	Kim Pong-ju	김퐁추	New	Reelected	—
11	Chi Chae-ryong	치채룡	New	Demoted	—
12	Chang Yun-pil	장윤필	New	Demoted	—
13	Kim Song-ae	김성애	New	Reelected	—
14	Son Song-pil	손송필	New	Reelected	—
15	Chon Se-bong	전세퐁	Old	Reelected	—
