= 8th Standing Committee of the Supreme People's Assembly =

8th Standing Committee
- Sign of the Supreme People's Assembly

30 December 1986 – 26 May 1990 (3 years, 148 days) Overview
- Type: Standing Committee of the Supreme People's Assembly
- Election: 1st Session of the 8th Supreme People's Assembly

Leadership
- Chairman: Yang Hyong-sop
- Vice Chairmen: Ho Chong-suk; Hong Ki-mun
- Secretary-General: Kim I-hun

Members
- Total: 15

The 8th Standing Committee of the Supreme People's Assembly (SPA) was elected by the 1st Session of the 8th Supreme People's Assembly on 30 December 1986. It was replaced on 26 May 1990 by the 9th SPA Standing Committee.

== Officers ==
=== Chairman ===
Name	Hangul	Took office	Left office	Duration
Yang Hyong-sop	양형섭	30 December 1986	26 May 1990	3 years and 147 days

=== Vice Chairman ===
Name	Hangul	Took office	Left office	Duration
Son Song-pil	손송필	30 December 1986	26 May 1990	3 years and 147 days
Yo Yong-ku	요용구	30 December 1986	26 May 1990	3 years and 147 days

=== Secretary ===
Name	Hangul	Took office	Left office	Duration
Kim Pong-chu	김퐁추	30 December 1986	26 May 1990	3 years and 147 days

== Members ==
Rank	Name	Hangul	7th STC	9th STC	Positions
1	Yang Hyong-sop	양형섭	Old	Reelected	Chairman of the Standing Committee of the Supreme People's Assembly
2	Son Song-pil	손송필	Old	Demoted	Vice Chairman of the Standing Committee of the Supreme People's Assembly
3	Yo Yong-ku	요용구	Old	Reelected	Vice Chairman of the Standing Committee of the Supreme People's Assembly
4	Kim Pong-chu	김퐁추	Old	Demoted	Secretary of the Standing Committee of the Supreme People's Assembly
—	Choe Yong-hae	최용해	New	Reelected	—
—	Chong Tu-hwan	종투환	Old	Reelected	—
—	Chu Chang-chun	추창춘	New	Demoted	—
—	Kim Kyong-pong	김경퐁	New	Demoted	—
—	Kim Song-ae	김성애	Old	Reelected	—
—	Nam Sun-hui	남순희	New	Demoted	—
—	Pak Su-tong	박수통	New	Reelected	—
—	Sok Yun-ki	속윤기	New	Demoted	—
—	Yi Mong-ho	이몽호	New	Reelected	—
—	Yom Tae-chun	염태천	Old	Reelected	—
—	Yu Ho-chun	유호천	New	Reelected	—
