= Committees of the 8th Supreme People's Assembly =

8th Committees
- Sign of the Supreme People's Assembly

30 December 1986 – 26 May 1990 (3 years, 147 days) Overview
- Type: Bills Committee; Budget Committee; Credentials Committee
- Election: 1st Session of the 8th Supreme People's Assembly

The committees of the 8th Supreme People's Assembly (SPA) of North Korea were elected by the 1st Session of the aforementioned body on 30 December 1986. It was replaced on 26 May 1990 by the committees of the 9th Supreme People's Assembly.

== Committees ==
=== Bills ===
Rank	Name	Hangul	7th COM	9th COM	Positions
1	Kye Ung-tae	계웅태	New	Reelected	Chairman of the SPA Bills Committee
—	Chong Mun-san	종문산	New	Demoted	—
—	Han Sang-kyu	한상규	Old	Reelected	—
—	Kang Hyon-su	강현수	New	Demoted	—
—	Kim Hui-chun	김희춘	New	Demoted	—
—	Paek Hak-nim	백학림	New	Reelected	—
—	Pang Hak-se	방학세	Old	Reelected	—

=== Budget ===
Rank	Name	Hangul	7th COM	9th COM	Positions
1	Yun Ki-bok	윤기복	New	Demoted	Chairman of the SPA Budget Committee
—	Kim Chang-chu	김창추	Old	Demoted	—
—	Kim Hyong-chong	김형총	New	Demoted	—
—	Pak Nam-ki	박남기	New	Reelected	—
—	Pak Sung-il	박성일	Old	Demoted	—
—	Sin Kyong-sik	신경식	New	Demoted	—
—	Yi Chun-song	이춘송	New	Demoted	—

=== Credentials ===
Not all members made public.

Rank	Name	Hangul	7th COM	9th COM	Positions
1	Yim Chun-chu	임춘추	Old	Demoted	Chairman of the SPA Credentials Committee
—	So Chol	서철	Old	Demoted	—
—	Yi Pyong-won	이평원	Old	Demoted	—
