= Committees of the 6th Supreme People's Assembly =

1977–1982 North Korean government body

6th Committees
- Sign of the Supreme People's Assembly

17 December 1977 – 5 April 1982 (4 years, 109 days) Overview
- Type: Bills Committee; Budget Committee; Credentials Committee; National Defence Commission
- Election: 1st Session of the 6th Supreme People's Assembly

The committees of the 6th Supreme People's Assembly (SPA) of North Korea were elected by the 1st Session of the 6th SPA on 17 December 1977. They were replaced on 5 April 1982 by the committees of the 7th Supreme People's Assembly.

== Committees ==
=== Bills ===
| Rank | Name | Hangul | 5th COM | 7th COM | Positions |
|---|---|---|---|---|---|
| 1 | Yun Ki-bok | 윤기복 | New | Reelected | Chairman of the SPA Bills Committee |
| 2 | Chong Tong-chol | 종통철 | New | Demoted | — |
| 3 | Yi Chin-su | 이진수 | New | Reelected | — |
| 4 | Pang Hak-se | 방학세 | New | Reelected | — |
| 5 | Kim Yun-hyok | 김윤혁 | New | Demoted | — |
| 6 | Yim Sok-ki | 임속기 | New | Demoted | — |
| 7 | Pyon Chang-bok | 표창복 | New | Demoted | — |

=== Budget ===
| Rank | Name | Hangul | 5th COM | 7th COM | Positions |
|---|---|---|---|---|---|
| 1 | Hong Si-hak | 홍시학 | New | Demoted | Chairman of the SPA Budget Committee |
| 2 | So Kwan-hui | 서관희 | New | Demoted | — |
| 3 | Kang Hyon-su | 강현수 | New | Demoted | — |
| 4 | Kye Hyong-sun | 계형선 | New | Demoted | — |
| 5 | Ho Sun | 호일 | New | Demoted | — |
| 6 | Kang Chung-han | 강청한 | New | Demoted | — |
| 7 | Kim Hyong-sam | 김형삼 | New | Demoted | — |

=== Credentials ===
Only one member was made public.

| Rank | Name | Hangul | 5th COM | 7th COM | Positions |
|---|---|---|---|---|---|
| 1 | Yim Chun-chu | 임춘추 | New | Reelected | Chairman of the SPA Credentials Committee |

=== National Defence ===
| Rank | Name | Hangul | 5th COM | 7th COM | Positions |
|---|---|---|---|---|---|
| 1 | Kim Il Sung | 김일성 | Old | Reelected | Chairman of the SPA National Defence Commission |
| 2 | Choe Hyon | 최현 | Old | Demoted | Vice Chairman of the SPA National Defence Commission |
| 3 | O Jin-u | 오진우 | Old | Reelected | Vice Chairman of the SPA National Defence Commission |
| 4 | O Paek-ryong | 오백용 | Old | Reelected | Vice Chairman of the SPA National Defence Commission |
