= Committees of the 5th Supreme People's Assembly =

5th Committees
- Sign of the Supreme People's Assembly

28 December 1972 – 17 December 1977 (4 years, 354 days) Overview
- Type: Bills Committee; Budget Committee; Credentials Committee; National Defence Commission
- Election: 1st Session of the 5th Supreme People's Assembly

The committees of the 5th Supreme People's Assembly (SPA) of North Korea were elected by the 1st Session of the SPA on 28 December 1972. They were replaced on 17 December 1977 by the committees of the 6th Supreme People's Assembly.

== Committees ==
=== Bills ===
Rank	Name	Hangul	4th COM	6th COM	Positions
1	O Tae-bong	오태봉	New	Demoted	Chairman of the SPA Bills Committee
2	Yi Kil-song	이길송	New	Demoted	—
3	Yi Pong-won	이퐁원	New	Demoted	—
4	So Kwan-hui	서관희	New	Demoted	—
5	Sin Su-gun	신수군	New	Demoted	—
6	Yi Pang-gun	이팡군	New	Demoted	—
7	Pan Il-byong	판일병	New	Demoted	—

=== Budget ===
Rank	Name	Hangul	4th COM	6th COM	Positions
1	Yun Ki-bok	윤기복	New	Demoted	Chairman of the SPA Budget Committee
2	Chong Tong-chol	종통철	New	Demoted	—
3	Pang Hak-se	방학세	New	Demoted	—
4	Han Sok-chin	한속진	New	Demoted	—
5	Kim Pyong-yul	김평열	New	Demoted	—
6	Yi Pong-gil	이퐁길	New	Demoted	—
7	Pak Chun-sik	박춘식	New	Demoted	—

=== Credentials ===
Only one member was made public.

Rank	Name	Hangul	4th COM	6th COM	Positions
1	Kim Tong-gyu	김동규	New	Demoted	Chairman of the SPA Credentials Committee

=== National Defence ===
Rank	Name	Hangul	6th COM	Positions
1	Kim Il Sung	김일성	Reelected	Chairman of the SPA National Defence Commission
2	Choe Hyon	최현	Reelected	Vice Chairman of the SPA National Defence Commission
3	O Jin-u	오진우	Reelected	Vice Chairman of the SPA National Defence Commission
4	O Paek-ryong	오백용	Reelected	Vice Chairman of the SPA National Defence Commission
