= 9th Standing Committee of the Supreme People's Assembly =

9th Standing Committee
- Sign of the Supreme People's Assembly

26 May 1990 – 6 September 1998 (8 years, 103 days) Overview
- Type: Standing Committee of the Supreme People's Assembly
- Election: 1st Session of the 9th Supreme People's Assembly

Leadership
- Chairman: Yang Hyong-sop
- Vice Chairmen: Paek In-chun; Yo Yong-ku
- Secretary-General: Yi Mong-ho

Members
- Total: 15

The 9th Standing Committee of the Supreme People's Assembly (SPA) was elected by the 1st Session of the 9th Supreme People's Assembly on 26 May 1990. It was replaced on 6 September 1998 by the 10th SPA Presidium.

== Officers ==
=== Chairman ===
Name	Hangul	Took office	Left office	Duration
Yang Hyong-sop	양형섭	26 May 1990	6 September 1998	8 years and 103 days

=== Vice Chairman ===
Name	Hangul	Took office	Left office	Duration
Paek In-chun	백인천	26 May 1990	6 September 1998	8 years and 103 days
Yo Yong-ku	요용구	26 May 1990	6 September 1998	8 years and 103 days

=== Secretary ===
Name	Hangul	Took office	Left office	Duration
Yi Mong-ho	이몽호	26 May 1990	6 September 1998	8 years and 103 days

== Members ==
Rank	Name	Hangul	8th STC	10th STC	Positions
1	Yang Hyong-sop	양형섭	Old	Reelected	Chairman of the Standing Committee of the Supreme People's Assembly
2	Paek In-chun	백인천	New	Demoted	Vice Chairman of the Standing Committee of the Supreme People's Assembly
3	Yo Yong-ku	요용구	Old	Demoted	Vice Chairman of the Standing Committee of the Supreme People's Assembly
4	Yi Mong-ho	이몽호	Old	Demoted	Secretary of the Standing Committee of the Supreme People's Assembly
—	Choe Yong-hae	최용해	Old	Demoted	—
—	Chong Chun-ki	종춘기	New	Demoted	—
—	Chong Ha-chol	종하철	New	Demoted	—
—	Chong Sin-hyok	종신혁	New	Demoted	—
—	Chong Tu-hwan	종투환	Old	Demoted	—
—	Kim Song-ae	김성애	Old	Demoted	—
—	Pak Su-tong	박수통	Old	Demoted	—
—	Won Tong-ku	원통구	New	Demoted	—
—	Yi Kye-paek	이계백	New	Demoted	—
—	Yom Tae-chun	염태천	Old	Demoted	—
—	Yu Ho-chun	유호천	Old	Demoted	—
