= Kim Jong-suk (politician) =

North Korean government official (born 1931)

- Born: 1931 (age 94–95); Taedong County, then part of Korea under Japanese rule
- Political party: Workers' Party of Korea
- Spouse: Ho Dam (died 1991)
- Relatives: Kim Il Sung (cousin)
- Awards: Order of Kim Il Sung (1992), Order of Kim Jong Il (2012)

Korean name
- Hangul: 김정숙
- Hanja: 金貞淑
- RR: Gim Jeongsuk
- MR: Kim Chŏngsuk

Kim Jong-suk (Korean: 김정숙; born 1931) is a North Korean government official. She is a cousin of Kim Il Sung, who was the first supreme leader and founder of North Korea. She was the chairwoman of the Committee for Cultural Relations with Foreign Countries, as well as the editor-in-chief of the newspaper Minju Joson. She has also been elected as a delegate for every Supreme People's Assembly since 1986.

== Life ==
Kim Jong-suk was born in 1931 in Taedong County, then part of Korea under Japanese rule. Since Kim is a cousin of Kim Il Sung, and North Korean citizens are unable to share their names with the Kim Dynasty, Kim is the only North Korean named Kim Jong-suk. She was married to Ho Dam—who was a close associate of Kim Jong Il—until his death in 1991.

Kim has served as the chairwoman and vice chairwoman of multiple committees related to North Korea's foreign relations since 1965, including the Korea–Latin American Friendship Association (조선-라틴아메리카 친선협회), the Korea–Cuba Solidarity Committee (조선-쿠바 연대성위원회), the Committee for Cultural Relations with Foreign Countries, and the Korea–Finland Friendship Association (조선-핀란드 친선협회). She has been a delegate to every Supreme People's Assembly since the 7th, and became the president and editor-in-chief of the newspaper Minju Joson in March 1986. A candidate for the Central Committee of the Workers' Party of Korea, Kim was elected to the Foreign Affairs Committee of the Supreme People's Assembly in December 1993, but the committee was abolished five years later.

After being appointed chairwoman of the Choson Foreign Cultural Liaison Committee (조선대외문화연락위원회) in December 2009, Kim attended multiple funeral committees and memorials, such as the National Funeral Committee (국가장의위원회) of Jo Myong-rok, the Kim Jong Il State Funeral Committee, the North Korea Preparatory Committee commemorating the 100th birthday of Kim Il Sung (김일성 생일 100주년 기념 조선준비위원회), and the North Korean side's preparatory committee for the 2017 Paektu Mountain Great Figures Celebration (Japanese: 2017白頭山偉人称賛大会), which was held in honor of Kim Il Sung and Kim Jong Il. During the 5th session of the 13th Presidium of the Supreme People's Assembly, she was elected as a member of the Foreign Affairs Committee, which had been revived after 19 years under the belief that it would improve North Korea's bilateral relations. Kim was re-elected as a delegate in the 2019 North Korean parliamentary election, but she was replaced as chairperson of the Committee for Cultural Relations with Foreign Countries by Xu Huyuan, who attended a meeting on 22 December 2021 between Choe Ryong-hae and Chinese diplomat Li Jinjun.

== Awards and honors ==
- April 1992: Order of Kim Il Sung
- February 2012: Order of Kim Jong Il
