= Kim Pok-sin =

North Korean politician

Kim Pok-sin (Korean: 김복신 born 1925) is a North Korean politician.

She was Vice-Minister of Light Industry from 1958 to 1966, and Minister of Textile and Paper Manufacturing Industry between 1971 and 1981.

She served as Deputy Director of the Puongyang Local General Bureau of Industry from 1966 to 1969.

From 1981, she served in the Light Industry Commission as Chairperson of the Committee for Light Industry.

In 1981, she was made Vice-Chairperson of the Council of Ministers of the Administration Council. She served as Vice Premier between 1981 and 1996.

She was appointed Alternate member of the Politburo in 1983.

== See also ==
- Government of North Korea
- List of elected or appointed female deputy heads of government
- Premier of North Korea
