= Han Ik-su =

North Korean politician (1912–1978)

- 한익수

Member of the WPK Politburo
- In office 1970–1978 Serving with Pak Song-chol, Ri Jong-ok
- President: Kim Il Sung

Chairman of the Central Committee Auditing Committee

Head of the KPA General Political Department
- In office December 1970 – August 1973
- Succeeded by: Ri Yong-mu

Personal details
- Born: 15 October 1912 Longjing, Jilin, China
- Died: 5 September 1978 (aged 65) Pyongyang, North Korea
- Party: Workers' Party of Korea

Han Ik-su (Korean: 한익수; October 15, 1912 – September 5, 1978) was a North Korean politician and militarist, guerrilla fighter, ambassador to China, member of the Politburo of the Central Committee of the Workers' Party of Korea, and the Central Committee Auditing Committee Chairman.

== Biography ==
Han Ik-su was born into a poor peasant family on October 15, 1912, in Longjing, Jilin, China. He joined the Korean People's Revolutionary Army, the predecessor of the Korean People's Army in 1931, and participated in the Battle of Pochonbo with Kim Il Sung and others in 1937. In 1945, Japan surrendered and the end of World War II, Han Ik-su continued to serve the North Korean government, and later became the company commander. Later, he was appointed as the principal of Kang Kon Military Academy (강건 종합 군관 학교). Before the Korean War broke out, he had been promoted to general. In 1961, he became a member of the Party Central Committee. From 1962 to 64, he was sent to Beijing as an ambassador to China, and was elected as a member of the Supreme People's Assembly in the same period. In 1968, he was promoted to director of the General Political Bureau of the Korean People's Army. The following year, he was elected as an alternate member of the Political Bureau.

In 1970, Han Ik-su became a member of the Political Committee following the 5th Congress of the Workers' Party of Korea. Two years later, he was awarded Kim Il Sung Order. In 1977, he was appointed chairman of the review committee of the Party Central Committee. After dying the following year, the North Korean government buried him in the Revolutionary Martyrs' Cemetery in recognition of his credit and cast a bust of him.

== Works ==
- Han Ik-su (1968). "Studying is the First and Foremost Task for the Revolutionaries". Reminiscences of the Anti-Japanese Guerillas. Pyongyang: Foreign Languages Publishing House. OCLC 3207400.
