= Kim Man-gum =

North Korean politician (1911–1984)

- 김만금

Member of the 5th WPK Politburo

Personal details
- Born: 1911
- Died: 1984 (aged 72–73)
- Resting place: Revolutionary Martyrs' Cemetery
- Education: Meiji University
- Occupation: Politician

Kim Man-gum (Korean: 김만금; 1911–1984) was a North Korean politician who served in various party and government positions including as a member of the Politburo of the Workers' Party of Korea.

== Biography ==
Born in Anju county, South Pyongan Province. He graduated from Meiji University in Japan and studied at the Soviet Executive School. He became an agriculture minister in 1959. By 1959, he held important positions such as delegate to the 2nd, 3rd, and 5th convocations of the Supreme People's Assembly, member of the Central Committee of the Workers' Party of Korea, chairman of the Agriculture Committee, Vice Premier from 11 July 1970 to 28 December 1972, director of the Agriculture Department of the Central Committee of the Workers' Party, and member of the Central People's Committee. In November 1970, following the 5th Congress of the Workers' Party of Korea, he became a candidate (alternate) member of the 5th Politburo. In September 1973, he was dismissed from his position as Vice Premier and Chairman of the Agricultural Committee, but returned and became Chairman of the Pyongyang City People's Committee in 1978. Following the 1982 parliamentary election he became a member of the 7th Supreme People's Assembly and a member of it's credential's committee. After his death, he was buried in the Revolutionary Martyrs' Cemetery in Pyongyang.

== Bibliography ==
- Suh, Dae-sook (1981). Korean Communism 1945–1980: A Reference Guide to the Political System (1st ed.). University Press of Hawaii. ISBN 0-8248-0740-5.
