= Kim Jung-rin =

North Korean politician

- 김중린

Personal details
- Born: 7 December 1923 Usi County, Chagang Province
- Died: 28 April 2010 (aged 86) Pyongyang, North Korea
- Cause of death: Myocardial infarction
- Party: Workers' Party of Korea

Kim Jung-rin (Korean: 김중린) (7 December 1923 – 28 April 2010) was a North Korean politician who was an alternate member of the Politburo of the Central Committee of the Workers' Party of Korea, as well as a member of the Politburo and party secretary.

== Biography ==
Kim Jung-rin was born on December 7, 1923, into a poor peasant family in Pyoktong County, North Pyongan Province (now Usi County, Chagang Province. His deeds before 1945 are unknown. He only knew that he had participated in the campaign for liberation of the Korean Peninsula in China. In 1945, Japan surrendered, and World War II ended, Kim Jung-rin came to North Korea and enrolled in the local Central Party School. In 1948, he became the party committee minister of North Hamgyong Province. Later, he was sent to the advanced party school of the Soviet Union for further study. In 1956, he had returned to China and was appointed as a standing member of the Central Committee of the Korean Red Cross, responsible for the Korean return movement in Japan. In 1966, he became Culture Secretary of the 4th Central Committee. In 1961, he was elected to the Central Committee of the Peaceful Unification Committee of the Motherland. In the same year, he was promoted to alternate member of the 4th Political Committee.

In 1962, Kim Jung-rin was elected as a member of the Supreme People's Assembly, and thereafter, until his death, he was re-elected 9 times. In 1968, he was arranged to participate in the January 21 incident. Although the attack was unsuccessful, he was appointed secretary of the Party Central Committee in the following year and was responsible for the affairs of Yugoslavia. Subsequently, in 1970, he was promoted to the Politburo. Two years later, he was elected to the Central People's Committee again. In 1976, he was appointed as the director of the Institute of South Korean Studies. In November 1977, he served as secretary of the United Front Department of the WPK. In 1982, he was awarded the Order of Kim Il Sung. In 1986, he became president of the Korean Central News Agency. In 1990, he was appointed as the chairman of the Qualification Review Committee of the Supreme People's Assembly.

In the inter-Korean relations, Kim Jong-rin participated in secret negotiations with Pyongyang, the head of the Central Intelligence Agency of South Korea in May 1972 as secretary of the South Korean Party. For diplomatic activities, he visited the Soviet Union and Poland as the delegation of the party in November 1987 and September 1988, respectively. As a key figure of the party, the activities recorded in the commentary group include the 10th anniversary of the death of Kim Il Sung's central memorial conference in July 2004, and the Pyongyang crowd conference for the task-penetration presented in the appeal of the Songun Revolutionary General Advancement Conference in February 2005, October 2005 Dang Chang-gun 60-stone Celebration Central Reporting Convention, May 2006 70th anniversary of the foundation of the National Liberation Party, April 2007 Chosun People's Army 75-stone Celebration Ceremony and October 2007 National Party Cell Secretary Convention Opening Ceremony.

On April 28, 2010, Kim Jung-rin died of myocardial infarction at the age of 86 and was awarded a state funeral. His funeral committee was chaired by Jon Pyong-ho and included Kim Yong-il, Kim Yong-chun, Ri Yong-mu and 37 others.
