= Kim Yong-chae =

South Korean politician (1932–2026)

- 김용채

Mayor of the Nowon District
- In office 1996–1998
- Parliamentary group: New Democratic Republican Party

Personal details
- Born: 5 October 1932 Pocheon, Korea, Empire of Japan
- Died: 10 March 2026 (aged 93)

Kim Yong-chae (Korean: 김용채; 5 October 1932 – 10 March 2026) was a South Korean politician.

== Life and career ==
Kim was born in Pocheon, Korea, Empire of Japan on 5 October 1932. He served as the mayor of the Nowon District (1996–1998). Kim died on 10 March 2026, at the age of 93.
