= So Kwan-hui =

North Korean politician

- 서관희

Minister of Agriculture

Personal details
- Born: 1926 Kankyōhoku Province, Korea, Empire of Japan
- Died: 1997
- Party: Workers' Party of Korea

Korean name
- Hangul: 서관희
- Hanja: 徐寬熙
- RR: Seo Gwanhui
- MR: Sŏ Kwanhŭi

So Kwan-hui (1926–1997) was a North Korean politician. He served as the North Korean Minister of Agriculture.

After initially disappearing in May 1996, he was accused in 1997 of spying for the United States government and sabotaging North Korean agriculture on purpose, leading to the North Korean famine. He was also accused of embezzling funds, originally intended for fertilizer, which had been given by Kim Jong Il, as well as of having been a counter-revolutionary South Korean spy from the very beginning who stayed behind in the north to infiltrate the Workers' Party. As a result, he was executed by firing squad publicly by the North Korean government.

An unidentified defector once claimed that some officials of the Socialist Youth League were executed around the same time, reportedly for "corrupt financial dealings" with South Korean intelligence agents. This was followed by a later purge of several other high government officials, also accused of being South Korean collaborators as well.

It has been speculated that Kim Chol-man replaced his position regarding the agriculture portfolio.
