= Hwang Jang-yop =

North Korean politician and defector (1923–2010)

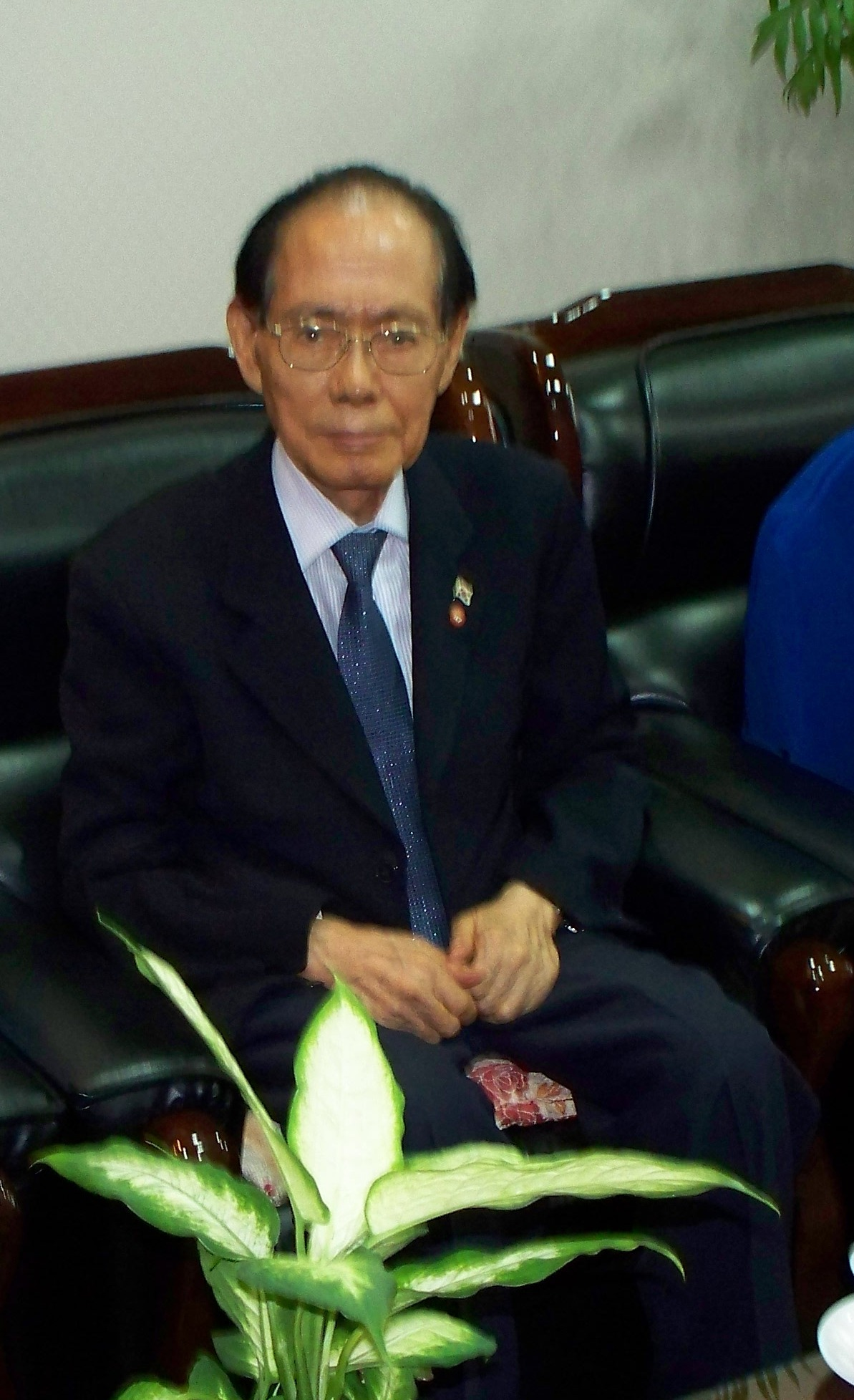
- Hwang in 2009

Chairman of the Standing Committee of the Supreme People's Assembly
- In office 28 December 1972 – 7 April 1983
- Preceded by: Choe Yong-gon
- Succeeded by: Yang Hyong-sop

Personal details
- Born: 17 February 1923 Kangdong County, Heian'nan Province, Korea, Empire of Japan
- Died: 10 October 2010 (aged 87) Seoul, South Korea
- Party: Workers' Party of Korea (1946–1997)

Korean name
- Hangul: 황장엽
- Hanja: 黃長燁
- RR: Hwang Jangyeop
- MR: Hwang Changyŏp

Hwang Jang-yop (Korean: 황장엽; 17 February 1923 – 10 October 2010) was a North Korean politician who defected to South Korea. He served as the Chairman of the Supreme People's Assembly from 1972 to 1983 and was largely responsible for crafting Juche, the state ideology of North Korea. He defected in 1997, making him the highest-ranking North Korean to have defected. He also served as the president of Kim Il Sung University and was a teacher to Kim Jong Il.

== Early life and education ==
Hwang was born in Kangdong, Heian'nan Province, Korea, Empire of Japan (now in South Pyongan Province, North Korea). He graduated from the Pyongyang Commercial School in 1941, and then went to Tokyo in 1942 to attend Chuo University's law school; however, he quit two years later and returned to Pyongyang, where he taught mathematics at his old school. He joined the Workers' Party of Korea in 1946, soon after its founding; from 1949 to 1953, he was sent to study at Moscow University in the Soviet Union. Upon his return to North Korea, he became head lecturer in philosophy at Kim Il Sung University. He would later ascend to the presidency of that university in April 1965.

== Career ==
Sometime in the late 1950s, Hwang discovered a 1955 speech, On Eliminating Dogmatism and Formalism and Establishing Juche in Ideological Work, in which Kim Il Sung said, "Juche means Chosun's revolution" (Chosun being the traditional name for Korea). At the time, Kim wanted to develop his own version of Marxism-Leninism, and Hwang was largely responsible for developing what became known as "the Juche Idea." As part of this, he helped scrub all of the paeans to Joseph Stalin that had been typical of Kim's speeches in the 1940s and early 1950s. He also supervised the rewriting of Korean Communist history to make it look like Kim had been the founder and leader of the ruling Workers' Party of Korea from its inception.

In 1972, Hwang became Chairman of the Standing Committee of the Supreme People's Assembly, a position which he would hold for 11 years.

In 1983, however, his term in the assembly ended and his standing deteriorated; though he had been Kim Jong Il's teacher at Kim Il Sung University, Kim now spoke to him only to criticize him, specifically admonishing him for taking too close an interest in China's capitalist reforms. Remarking on his role as advisor to Kim Jong Il, Hwang stated: "When I proposed something, he would pretend to listen at first, but in the end, he would never listen."

== Defection ==
Hwang, along with his aide Kim Duk-hong, the president of a North Korean trading firm in Beijing, defected on returning from a February 1997 trip to Tokyo by walking into the South Korean embassy in Beijing and posing as South Korean diplomats with the use of fake South Korean passports. Once their true identities were discovered, Pyongyang immediately threatened retaliation, while Beijing police sealed off the South Korean embassy. Three days later, North Korean defector Yi Han-yong, the nephew of Kim Jong Il's mistress Song Hye-rim, was shot dead outside of his home in South Korea in Bundang, Gyeonggi Province, by unknown assailants often suspected to be North Korean special forces agents; South Korean Prime Minister Lee Soo-sung described the attack as retaliation for Hwang's defection. A few days later, Kim Jong Il was quoted on Radio Pyongyang as saying, "Cowards, leave if you want to. We will defend the red flag of revolution to the end", a message seen as marking acceptance of Hwang's defection.

Chinese authorities eventually permitted Hwang to depart for South Korea via the Philippines several weeks later. Considering Hwang's prominent role in the North Korean regime, his defection caused a stir, with The Washington Post saying it was "as if Joseph Goebbels had defected from Nazi Germany".

After his defection, Hwang's wife back in North Korea died by suicide, and one of his daughters died under mysterious circumstances by falling off a truck; his other children, a daughter and a son, as well as his grandchildren, are sometimes speculated to have been sent to prison. After his arrival in South Korea, he became a harsh critic of North Korea, publishing over 12 books and treatises, many of which accused Kim Jong Il of "betraying Juche and building feudalism instead of socialism", and used his position as chairman of the Unification Policy Research Institute to spread his message. However, under the Sunshine Policy of president Kim Dae-jung, who took office in 1998, Hwang found himself increasingly marginalised; in November 2000, he was removed from the chairmanship of the Unification Policy Research Institute, leading him to complain that the South Korean government wanted him to stay quiet so as not to upset the North.

Hwang contributed to the Daily NK, an online newspaper funded by U.S. state funded NGOs with staff in South Korea and China. He described his feelings surrounding the defection in the paper.

In April 2010, the South Korean National Intelligence Service announced that it had arrested two North Korean agents who had allegedly been sent to assassinate Hwang. The two agents had reportedly trained for four years in preparation for their mission. They had posed as defectors, but were discovered during questioning by South Korean authorities. They claimed that they would receive assistance from North Korean sympathisers in the South, but refused to give any names when questioned. Hwang commented on the assassination attempt, "Death is just death. There is no difference from dying of old age or being killed by Kim Jong Il." In June 2010, South Korea sentenced the two would-be assassins to 10 years in prison.

== Death ==
Hwang was found dead in his home in Seoul, South Korea, on the morning of 10 October 2010. Initial reports stated that he died of a heart attack. He died while bathing, and as such a large amount of water entered his lungs; however, an autopsy found no poison or drugs in his body, and footage from surveillance cameras showed no signs of forcible entry. On those grounds, the Seoul Metropolitan Police Agency (SMPA) stated that there was no evidence that his death might be murder and that they would close their investigation. On 20 October, just shortly after Hwang's death, the SMPA announced that it had arrested another would-be assassin of Hwang, Ri Dong-sam, who had also entered South Korea posing as a North Korean defector; however, the charges had no connection to Hwang's death.

== Bibliography ==
Hwang published 20 books after his defection to South Korea:

- Hwang Jang Jop (1999). I Saw the Truth of the History. Hanul Books.
- — (2001). Sunshine Siding with Darkness Cannot Beat Darkness. Monthly Chosun.
- — (2002). World Democratization and the Last War of Human Beings. The Zeitgeist.
- — (2002). National Life More Precious than Individual's Life. The Zeitgeist.
- — (2003). Several Matters about the Human-centered Philosophy. The Zeitgeist.
- — (2005). Democratic Political Philosophy. The Zeitgeist.
- — (2006). The Truth and Deceit of North Korea. The Zeitgeist.
- — (2006). Dialectical Strategy and Tactics Theory. The Zeitgeist.
- — (2006). Hwang Jang Yop's Memoirs. The Zeitgeist. Archived from the original on 19 August 2016.
- — (2007). Philosophy for Youths. The Zeitgeist.
- — (2008). Human-centered Philosophy Principles. The Zeitgeist.
- — (2008). North Korean Democratization and Democratic Strategy. The Zeitgeist.
- — (2009). Dialectics and Dialectic Strategy and Tactics. The Zeitgeist.
- — (2009). Democracy and Communism. The Zeitgeist.
- — (2010). Logic. The Zeitgeist.
- — (2010). Human-centered Philosophy – Outlook on the World. The Zeitgeist.
- — (2010). Human-centered Philosophy – Outlook on History. The Zeitgeist.
- — (2010). Human-centered Philosophy – Outlook on Life. The Zeitgeist.

== See also ==
- North Korean defectors
- North Koreans in South Korea
- South Korean defectors
- Choe Deok-sin, South Korean foreign minister, highest-ranking defector from the South
