= So Chol =

North Korean politician

- 서철

Member of the WPK Politburo
- Leader: Kim Il Sung

Personal details
- Born: 1907
- Died: 1 October 1992 (aged 84–85) Pyongyang, North Korea
- Citizenship: North Korean
- Party: Workers' Party of Korea

Korean name
- Hangul: 서철
- Hanja: 徐哲
- RR: Seo Cheol
- MR: Sŏ Ch'ŏl

So Chol (Korean: 서철, c. 1907–1 October 1992) was a member of North Korea's inner ruling circle, holding political and diplomatic posts.

In the 1950s and 1960s, So held several ambassadorial posts. Since 1969, he was a member of the Politburo of the Workers' Party of Korea, the highest ruling body of the party.

According to North Korea's Korean Central News Agency, he died on October 1, 1992, after a long illness, at the age of 85 years. The cause of death was not disclosed in the press release.

== Works ==
- Kim Il-sung; Choe Hyon; Pak Sung-chul; O Jin-u; So Chol; et al. (1982). Twenty-year-long Anti-Japanese Revolution Under the Red Sunrays: September 1931 – February 1936. Vol. 2. Pyongyang: Foreign Languages Publishing House. OCLC 914716941.
