= Ho Jong-suk =

North Korean politician (1908–1991)

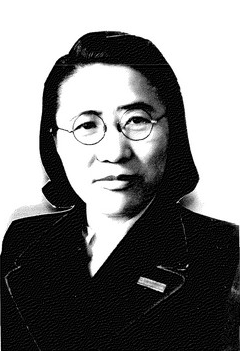
- Ho in 1945

Chief Justice of the People's Supreme Court

2nd term
- In office 28 October 1959 – 24 June 1960
- Preceded by: Kim Ha-un
- Succeeded by: Kim Ik-son

Minister of Justice

2nd term
- In office 18 September 1957 – 31 August 1959
- Premier: Kim Il Sung
- Succeeded by: Post abolished

1st term
- In office 3 August 1957 – 18 September 1957
- Premier: Kim Il Sung
- Preceded by: Hong Ki-ju

Minister of Culture and Propaganda

1st term
- In office 9 September 1948 – 3 August 1957
- Premier: Kim Il Sung
- Preceded by: Post established
- Succeeded by: Han Sol-ya as Minister of Education and Culture

Personal details
- Born: Ho Jong-ja; 16 July 1908 Hansong, Korean Empire
- Died: 5 June 1991 (aged 82) Pyongyang, North Korea
- Party: Workers' Party of Korea (from 1949)
- Other political affiliations: Workers' Party of North Korea (1946–1949); Korean National Revolutionary Party; Communist Party of Korea; Korean Communist Party (1921–1922)
- Parent: Ho Hon (father)
- Occupation: Politician, activist

Korean name
- Hangul: 허정숙
- Hanja: 許貞淑
- RR: Heo Jeongsuk
- MR: Hŏ Chŏngsuk

Birth name
- Hangul: 허정자
- Hanja: 許貞子
- RR: Heo Jeongja
- MR: Hŏ Chŏngja

Ho Jong-suk (Korean: 허정숙; 16 July 1908 – 5 June 1991) was a prominent female figure in Korean communism and in the sexual liberation movement of Korea under Japanese rule. From 1948, she served multiple offices in North Korea, including the Minister of Health and Chief Justice of the Supreme Court of North Korea.

== Biography ==
She was born Hŏ Jŏng-ja (허정자), the daughter of Ho Hon. In her early years, Ho went to Japan to study at Kwansei School in Tokyo. She later left, and in her next years Ho went to the Shanghai International Settlement of Republic of China where she was given an entrance to Shanghai Foreign High School where she graduated. Later she returned to her country. In 1921, she participated in the women's movement and joined the Korean Communist Party.

At that time, Japanese Government-General of Korea decided to make the Communist Party illegal. She avoided persecution for participation in the Communist Party. Later in 1924, she was introduced to International Women's Day. In March 1925, she went to a Women's Day event in Seoul. In 1927 she was a founding member of Geunwoohoi and also participated to Singanhoe (신간회).

Ho also was in favor of "Unrelated Love and Sex". Her opinion was denounced in Korean society because at that time, the vestiges of fundamentalist Confucianism remained in the Koreas.

In 1936, she went to China where she participated in the Korean National Revolutionary Party (조선민족혁명당). In 1938, she went to Hebei, participated in Chosen Independence alliance, an Anti-Japanese Korean resistance Group. In 1945, she went to Seoul but she left for North Korea to avoid right-wing terrorism. In 1948 she participated in the North Korean government. She served as Minister of Culture from 1948 to 1957 and Minister of Justice in 1957.

Ho served as the Chief Justice of the Supreme Court of North Korea between 28 October 1959 and 1960.

== Bibliography ==
- Within gracious love (은혜로운 사랑 속에서)
- In the days of democratic nation-building (민주건국의 나날에)
- Reflecting on the great history of love (위대한 사랑의 력사를 되새기며)

== See also ==
- Hwang Jini
- Heo Nanseolheon
- Na Hye-sok
- Shin Saimdang
