= Ho Dam =

North Korean politician (1929–1991)

- 허담
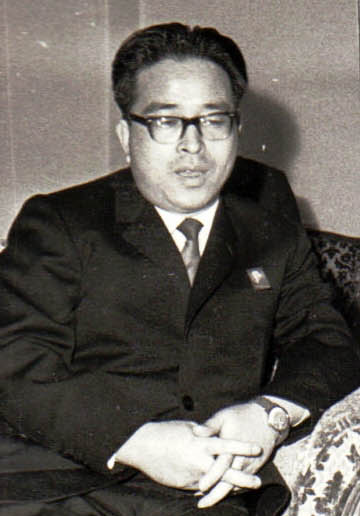
- Ho in 1972

Minister of Foreign Affairs
- In office 1970–1983
- Preceded by: Pak Song-chol
- Succeeded by: Kim Yong-nam

Personal details
- Born: 6 March 1929 Wonsan, Kankyōnan Province, Korea, Empire of Japan
- Died: 11 May 1991 (aged 62) Pyongyang, North Korea
- Party: Workers' Party of Korea
- Spouse: Kim Jong Suk

Korean name
- Hangul: 허담
- Hanja: 許錟
- RR: Heo Dam
- MR: Hŏ Tam

Ho Dam (Korean: 허담; March 6, 1929 – May 11, 1991) was a prominent North Korean politician and diplomat who served as the country's Foreign Minister from 1970 to 1983. Over his career, Ho Dam held several key positions within the North Korean government, including membership in the Politburo of the Workers' Party of Korea and chairmanship of the Committee for the Peaceful Reunification of the Fatherland. He played a significant role in shaping North Korea's foreign policy during a period of heightened tensions on the Korean Peninsula, and in 1977 became the first senior North Korean official to visit the United States.

After his tenure as Foreign Minister, Ho Dam became secretary of the Workers' Party of Korea and continued to be an influential figure in the country's political landscape. He accompanied Kim Il Sung to Yugoslavia in 1980 for the funeral of President Josip Broz Tito, reflecting his status as a trusted diplomat. In 1990, he was appointed chairman of the Foreign Affairs Committee of the Supreme People's Assembly, North Korea's parliament. Ho Dam is remembered as one of North Korea's most experienced diplomats during the Cold War era, contributing to both inter-Korean relations and the country's international outreach. He died in 1991 after a long illness.

== Life ==
He was a member of the ruling Politburo of North Korea's Communist Party, and was also chairman of the Committee for the Peaceful Reunification of the Fatherland, which made nominal efforts to reunite the Communist North with the capitalist South.

As Foreign Minister in 1977, he became the first senior North Korean official to visit the United States. He left the Foreign Minister's job in 1983 and became secretary of the Workers' Party of Korea. In 1980, he accompanied Kim Il Sung to Belgrade, Yugoslavia for the funeral of the Yugoslav leader Josip Broz Tito (1892–1980).

In 1990 he was named chairman of the Foreign Affairs Committee of the Supreme People's Assembly, North Korea's parliament.

Ho Dam died on May 11, 1991, from a long illness, according to KCNA. The news agency did not specify the cause of death.

Political offices
Preceded by Pak Song-chol	Foreign Minister of North Korea (DPRK); 1970–1983	Succeeded by Kim Yong-nam
