= 2nd Supreme People's Assembly =

- Sign of the Supreme People's Assembly

18 September 1957 – 23 October 1962 (5 years, 35 days) Overview
- Type: Session of the Supreme People's Assembly
- Election: 27 August 1957

Leadership
- Chairman: Choe Won-taek
- Vice Chairmen: Yi Ki-yong; Kim Chang-jun; Kim Tuk-nan

Members
- Total: 215 deputies

The 2nd Supreme People's Assembly in North Korea was elected on 27 August 1957 and convened for its first session on 18–20 September 1957. It was replaced on 23 October 1962 by the 3rd Supreme People's Assembly.

== Meetings ==
Meeting	Start–end	Length	Session agenda
1st Session	18–20 September 1957	3 days	8 items: 1. Establishing the 2nd Credentials Committee.; 1. Election of chairman and ordinary members; 1. Yi Hyo-sun elected as chairman with Kim Tae-gun, Kim Won-bong, Yi Hong-yol, Sin Hong-ye, Pak Chang-sik and Pak Yong-tae elected as ordinary members.; 2. Organising the Standing Committee of the SPA Congress.; 1. Establishment of the Bills Committee of the Supreme People's Assembly.; 1. Elections of Bills Committee chairman; 1. Kim Ik-son elected.; 2. Election of members to the Bills Committee; 1. Kim Yong-jin, Sin Nam-chol, Cho Yong, Yu Chol-mok, Choe Chong-hak, Yi Yu-min, Ho Hak-song and Han In-sok elected.; 2. Establishment of the Budget Committee of the Supreme People's Assembly.; 1. Elections of Budget Committee chairman; 1. Song Pong-uk elected.; 2. Election of members to the Budget Committee; 1. Paek Nam-un, Chon Tae-hwan, Kim Sang-chol, Chong Tu-hwan, Kim Tuk-nan, Hyon Hun, Song Chang-nyom, Yi Chae-chon, Hwang Sun-chon, Choe Chol-hwan, Chang Yun-pil, Chong Yon-pyo, Mun Tae-hwan, So Chun-sik, Kim Mun-gun and Yim Kun-sang elected.; 3. Establishment of the Foreign Affairs Committee of the Supreme People's Assembly.; 1. Elections of Foreign Affairs Committee chairman; 1. Kim Chang-man elected.; 2. Election of members to the Foreign Affairs Committee; 1. Kim Man-gum, Kim Yong-su, Hong Chung-sik, Ho Pin, Pak Yong-guk and Ko Kyong-in elected.; 3. Discussion of decrees issued by the 1st Standing Committee between the 13th Session of the 1st Supreme People's Assembly and the 1st Session of the 2nd SPA.; 1. Approved.; 4. Establishment the 2nd Standing Committee.; 1. Election of Chairman; 1. Kim Tu-bong elected.; 2. Election of vice chairmen; 1. Yi Kuk-no, Hyon Chil-chong and Kim Won-bong elected.; 3. Election of Secretary-General; 1. Kan Yang-uk elected.; 4. Election of ordinary members; 1. Pak Chong-ae, Kang Chin-gon, Song Chu-sik, Kim Pyong-je, Won Hong-gu, Yi Man-gyu, Yi Song-un, Han Sang-du, Kim Chang-dok, Chong No-sik, Kim Chon-hae, Ha Ang-chon, Chang Hae-u, Kye Ung-sang, Yi Myon-sang and Song Yong elected.; 5. Election of the 2nd Cabinet of North Korea.; 1. Election of Premier of the Cabinet; 1. Kim Il Sung elected.; 2. Pak Chong-ae proposed to entrust the composition of the 2nd Cabinet to Kim Il Sung; 1. Proposal approved.; 6. Appointment of the Procurator-General of the Central Procurator's Office; 1. Pak Se-chang appointed.; 7. Appointment of the Chief Justice of the People's Supreme Court; 1. Kim Ha-hun appointed.; 8. Kim Il Sung delivers a speech known as "On the Immediate Tasks of the People's Power in Socialist Construction".
2nd Session	17–19 February 1958	3 days	3 items: 1. The account of the state budget for 1956, and proposal for the 1958 state budget; 1. Approved.; 2. On the decisions of the 4th Supreme Soviet of the Soviet Union and the proposals delivered by the 4th Council of Ministers known as "The Easing of International Tension" and "The Establishment and Maintenance of World Peace"; 1. Approved.; 3. Discussion of decrees issued by the 2nd Standing Committee between the 1st and 2nd sessions.; 1. Approved.
3rd Session	9–11 June 1958	3 days	6 items: 1. Proposal for the 1st Five-Year Plan for the Development of the People's Economy; 1. Approved.; 2. Discussion of decrees issued by the 2nd Standing Committee between the 2nd and 3rd sessions; 1. Approved.; 3. A speech by Kim Il Sung, known as "All for the Prosperity and Development of the Fatherland"; 1. Approved.; 4. Proposal on laws for the adopted five-years plan; 1. Approved.; 5. Pak Chong-ae proposes that a letter to China be written; 1. Approved.; 6. Establishment of a constitutional draft committee.; 1. Elections; 1. Ho Jong-suk is elected committee chairwoman; the remaining members were not disclosed.
4th Session	1–2 October 1958	2 days	3 items: 1. On the introduction of a compulsory secondary education system, and the future introduction of a compulsory system of technical education.; 1. Approved.; 2. Discussion of decrees issued by the 2nd Standing Committee between the 3rd and 4th sessions; 1. Approved.; 3. On organisational concerns; 1. Dismissal of personnel in the 2nd Standing Committee; 1. Kim Won-bong and Hyon Chil-chong dismissed.; 2. By-election to the 2nd Standing Committee; 1. Han Sol-ya and Ko Chun-taek elected
5th Session	19–21 February 1959	3 days	3 items: 1. On the 1957 state budget and the proposed 1959 state budget; 1. Approved.; 2. Concerning the tax-in-kind in the agricultural sector; 1. Approved.; 3. Discussion of decrees issued by the 2nd Standing Committee between the 4th and 5th sessions; 1. Approved.
6th Session	26–28 October 1959	3 days	4 items: 1. Report by Vice Premier of the Cabinet and Minister of Foreign Affairs Nam Il on Korean reunification; 1. Approved.; 2. On the restructuring of the national education system; 1. Approved.; 3. Discussion of decrees issued by the 2nd Standing Committee between the 5th and 6th sessions; 1. Approved.; 4. On organisational concerns; 1. By-election to the 2nd Standing Committee; 1. Kim Kyong-sok and Pak Sin-dok elected.; 2. Recall of Vice Chairman of the 2nd Standing Committee; 1. Ko Chun-taek recalled.; 3. By-election of Vice Chairman of the 2nd Standing Committee; 1. Kang Yang-uk elected.; 4. Recall of Secretary-General of the 2nd Standing Committee; 1. Kang Yang-uk recalled.; 5. By-election of Secretary-General of the 2nd Standing Committee; 1. Pak Mun-gyu elected.; 6. Recall of Chief Justice of the People's Supreme Court; 1. Kim Ha-hun recalled.; 7. By-election of Chief Justice of the People's Supreme Court; 1. Ho Jong-suk elected.
7th Session	15–17 February 1960	3 days	3 items: 1. On the accounting of the 1958 state budget, and the proposed state budget for 1960.; 1. Approved.; 2. On improving the national public health system; 1. Approved.; 3. Discussion of decrees issued by the 2nd Standing Committee between the 6th and 7th sessions; 1. Approved.
8th Session	19–24 June 1960	6 days	7 items: 1. Report by Choe Yong-gon on Korean reunification; 1. Approved.; 2. Report by Vice Premier and Chairman of the Heavy Industry Commission Ri Jong-ok on the accomplishments made during the 1st Five-Year Plan; 1. Approved.; 3. Discussion of decrees issued by the 2nd Standing Committee between the 7th and 8th sessions; 1. Approved.; 4. On organisational concerns; 1. Recall of Chief Justice of the People's Supreme Court; 1. Ho Jong-suk is recalled.; 2. By-election of Chief Justice of the People's Supreme Court; 1. Kim Ik-son is elected.; 5. A letter to the National Assembly of South Korea and South Korean political organisations in line with plans to increase economic and cultural interchange is proposed; 1. Approved.; 6. Report by Vice Premier and Minister of Foreign Trade Yi Chu-yon, known as "Let's Realise the Economic Interchange and Cooperation Between the South and the North as Soon as Possible in Order to Relieve South Korea from Economic Bankruptcy"; 1. Approved.; 7. Report by Minister of Foreign Affairs Pak Song-chol, known as "Let's Fight Against the Imperialists for the Peaceful Unification of the Fatherland and the Eternal Peace of the World"; 1. Approved.
9th Session	23–25 March 1961	3 days	3 items: 1. The account of the state budget for 1959, and proposal for the 1960 state budget; 1. Approved.; 2. Discussion of decrees issued by the 2nd Standing Committee between the 8th and 9th sessions; 1. Approved.; 3. On organisational concerns; 1. Recall of Vice Chairman of the 2nd Standing Committee; 1. Yi Kuk-no recalled.; 2. By-election of Vice Chairman of the 2nd Standing Committee; 1. Paek Nam-un elected.
10th Session	5 April 1962	1 day	2 items: 1. The account of the state budget for 1960, and proposal for the 1962 state budget; 1. Approved.; 2. Discussion of decrees issued by the 2nd Standing Committee between the 9th and 10th sessions; 1. Approved.
11th Session	20–21 June 1962	2 days	2 items: 1. On working for the withdrawal of the United States military from South Korea; 1. Approved.; 2. Discussion of decrees issued by the 2nd Standing Committee between the 10th and 11th sessions; 1. Approved.

== Officers ==
=== Chairman ===
Name	Hangul	Took office	Left office	Duration
Choe Won-taek	최원택	20 September 1957	23 October 1962	5 years and 33 days

=== Vice Chairman ===
Name	Hangul	Took office	Left office	Duration
Yi Ki-yong	이기영	20 September 1957	23 October 1962	5 years and 33 days
Kim Chang-jun	김창준	20 September 1957	28 October 1959	2 years and 38 days
Kim Tuk-nan	김턱난	28 October 1959	22 October 1962	2 years and 360 days

== Deputies ==
№	Constituency	Name	Hangul	1st SPA	3rd SPA	Supreme People's Assembly						Workers' Party of Korea				
№	Constituency	Name	Hangul	1st SPA	3rd SPA	2nd CAB	2nd STC	2nd BIL	2nd BUD	2nd CRE	2nd FOA	3rd CC	3rd STC	3rd ORG	3rd INS	3rd CAC
1	Pyongyang City	Kim Kwang-hyop	김광협	New	Reelected	V Premier	—	—	—	—	—	Member	Member	—	—	—
2	Pyongyang City	Kim Tu-bong	김두봉	Old	Purged	—	—	—	—	—	—	Member	Member	—	—	—
3	Pyongyang City	Kim Myong-jun	김명준	New	Purged	—	—	—	—	—	—	—	—	—	—	—
4	Pyongyang City	Yi Nam-i	이남이	New	Not	—	—	—	—	—	—	—	—	—	—	—
5	Pyongyang City	Yi Song-un	이송운	New	Reelected	—	Member	—	—	—	—	Member	—	—	—	—
6	Pyongyang City	Yi Chong-suk	이정숙	Old	Reelected	—	—	—	—	—	—	—	—	—	—	—
7	Pyongyang City	Pak Yong-sop	박영섭	New	Not	—	—	—	—	—	—	—	—	—	—	—
8	Pyongyang City	Pak Yong-sin	박영신	New	Reelected	—	—	—	—	—	—	—	—	—	—	—
9	Pyongyang City	Yu Song-hun	유성훈	New	Not	—	—	—	—	—	—	—	—	—	—	—
10	Pyongyang City	Chong Yon-pyo	정연표	New	Not	—	—	—	Member	—	—	Alternate	—	—	—	—
11	Pyongyang City	Chu Pyong-son	주병선	New	Not	—	—	—	—	—	—	—	—	—	—	—
12	Pyongyang City	Choe Kyong-hwi	최경휘	New	Not	—	—	—	—	—	—	—	—	—	—	—
13	Pyongyang City	Choe Sang-hwa	최상화	New	Reelected	—	—	—	—	—	—	—	—	—	—	—
14	Pyongyang City	Hong Ki-hwang	홍기황	Old	Purged	Member	—	—	—	—	—	—	—	—	—	—
15	South Pyongan	Kang Yang-uk	강량욱	Old	Reelected	—	V. Chairman	—	—	—	—	—	—	—	—	—
16	South Pyongan	Kang Chun-guk	강춘국	New	Reelected	—	—	—	—	—	—	—	—	—	—	—
17	South Pyongan	Kang Chin-gon	강진건	Old	Not	—	Member	—	—	—	—	Member	—	—	—	—
18	South Pyongan	Kim Tu-sam	김두삼	New	Not	Member	—	—	—	—	—	Member	—	—	—	—
19	South Pyongan	Kim Rak-hui	김락희	New	Not	—	—	—	—	—	—	—	—	—	—	—
20	South Pyongan	Kim Man-gum	김만금	New	Reelected	Member	—	—	—	—	Member	Member	—	—	—	—
21	South Pyongan	Kim Il Sung	김일성	Old	Reelected	Premier	—	—	—	—	—	Member	Member	Member	—	—
22	South Pyongan	Kim Chang-dok	김창덕	New	Reelected	—	Member	—	—	—	—	Member	—	—	—	—
23	South Pyongan	Yu Su-yon	유수연	New	Not	—	—	—	—	—	—	—	—	—	—	—
24	South Pyongan	Yu Chuk-un	유축운	New	Purged	—	—	—	—	—	—	Member	—	—	—	—
25	South Pyongan	Yu Hyon-gyu	유현규	New	Not	—	—	—	—	—	—	—	—	—	—	—
26	South Pyongan	Yi Ki-yong	리기영	Old	Reelected	—	—	—	—	—	—	—	—	—	—	—
27	South Pyongan	Yi Man-gyu	이만규	Old	Reelected	—	Member	—	—	—	—	—	—	—	—	—
28	South Pyongan	Yi Yong	이영	Old	Purged	—	—	—	—	—	—	—	—	—	—	—
29	South Pyongan	Yi Il-gyong	이일경	New	Reelected	Member	—	—	—	—	—	—	—	—	—	—
30	South Pyongan	Yi Chae-chon	이재천	New	Not	—	—	—	Member	—	—	Alternate	—	—	—	—
31	South Pyongan	Yi Chong-man	이종만	Old	Not	—	—	—	—	—	—	—	—	—	—	—
32	South Pyongan	Yim Kun-sang	임근상	New	Not	—	—	—	Member	—	—	—	—	—	—	—
33	South Pyongan	Pak To-hwa	박도화	New	Not	—	—	—	—	—	—	—	—	—	—	—
34	South Pyongan	Pak Mu	박무	New	Purged	—	—	—	—	—	—	Member	—	—	—	—
35	South Pyongan	Pak Song-guk	박성국	New	Reelected	—	—	—	—	—	—	—	—	—	—	—
36	South Pyongan	Pak Yong-guk	박용국	New	Reelected	—	—	—	—	—	Member	Alternate	—	—	—	—
37	South Pyongan	Song Yong	송영	New	Reelected	—	Member	—	—	—	—	—	—	—	—	—
38	South Pyongan	Yun Pong-jin	윤봉진	New	Not	—	—	—	—	—	—	—	—	—	—	—
39	South Pyongan	Yun Chi-il	윤치일	New	Not	—	—	—	—	—	—	—	—	—	—	—
40	South Pyongan	Chang Yun-pil	장윤필	New	Reelected	—	—	—	Member	—	—	—	—	—	—	—
41	South Pyongan	Chang Pyong-san	장평산	New	Not	—	—	—	—	—	—	Alternate	—	—	—	—
42	South Pyongan	Chang Hae-u	장해우	Old	Not	—	Member	—	—	—	—	—	—	—	—	—
43	South Pyongan	Chong Tu-hwan	정두환	New	Reelected	—	—	—	Member	—	—	Alternate	—	—	—	—
44	South Pyongan	Chong Chun-taek	정준택	Old	Reelected	V Premier	—	—	—	—	—	Member	—	—	—	—
45	South Pyongan	Choe Tu-chan	최두찬	New	Not	—	—	—	—	—	—	—	—	—	—	—
46	South Pyongan	Choe Sung-hui	최승희	Old	Not	—	—	—	—	—	—	—	—	—	—	—
47	South Pyongan	Choe Chol-hwan	최철환	New	Not	—	—	—	Member	—	—	Alternate	—	—	—	—
48	South Pyongan	Han Il-mu	한일무	Old	Not	—	—	—	—	—	—	Member	—	—	—	—
49	South Pyongan	Han Tong-baek	한동백	New	Reelected	—	—	—	—	—	—	—	—	—	—	—
50	South Pyongan	Hong Chung-sik	홍증식	Old	Not	—	—	—	—	—	Member	—	—	—	—	—
51	North Pyongan	Kang Yong-chang	강영창	New	Reelected	Member	—	—	—	—	—	Member	—	—	—	—
52	North Pyongan	Kye Ung-sang	계응상	New	Reelected	—	Member	—	—	—	—	—	—	—	—	—
53	North Pyongan	Ko Chun-taek	고준택	Old	Reelected	Member	V. Chairman	—	—	—	—	—	—	—	—	—
54	North Pyongan	Kwon O-gil	권오길	New	Not	—	—	—	—	—	—	—	—	—	—	—
55	North Pyongan	Kim Tuk-nan	김득란	Old	Reelected	—	—	—	Member	—	—	—	—	—	—	—
56	North Pyongan	Kim Sok-yong	김석용	New	Reelected	—	—	—	—	—	—	—	—	—	—	—
57	North Pyongan	Kim Song-mun	김송문	New	Not	—	—	—	—	—	—	—	—	—	—	—
58	North Pyongan	Kim Se-yul	김세율	Old	Purged	—	—	—	—	—	—	—	—	—	—	—
59	North Pyongan	Kim Hoe-il	김회일	New	Reelected	Member	—	—	—	—	—	Member	—	—	—	—
60	North Pyongan	Na Sung-gyu	나성규	Old	Not	—	—	—	—	—	—	—	—	—	—	—
61	North Pyongan	Yang Sin-yong	양신용	New	Not	—	—	—	—	—	—	—	—	—	—	—
62	North Pyongan	No Yong-se	노용세	New	Reelected	—	—	—	—	—	—	—	—	—	—	—
63	North Pyongan	Yi Tong-hwa	이통화	Old	Not	—	—	—	—	—	—	—	—	—	—	—
64	North Pyongan	Yi Myon-sang	이면상	New	Reelected	—	Member	—	—	—	—	—	—	—	—	—
65	North Pyongan	Yi Sung-gi	리승기	New	Reelected	—	—	—	—	—	—	—	—	—	—	—
66	North Pyongan	Yi Chon-ho	이천호	New	Not	Member	—	—	—	—	—	Alternate	—	—	—	—
67	North Pyongan	So Chun-sik	소춘식	New	Not	—	—	—	Member	—	—	Alternate	—	—	—	—
68	North Pyongan	Sin Pong-hyon	신퐁현	New	Not	—	—	—	—	—	—	—	—	—	—	—
69	North Pyongan	An Pyong-su	안평수	New	Not	—	—	—	—	—	—	—	—	—	—	—
70	North Pyongan	O Han-sang	오한상	New	Not	—	—	—	—	—	—	—	—	—	—	—
71	North Pyongan	Won Hong-gu	원홍구	Old	Reelected	—	Member	—	—	—	—	—	—	—	—	—
72	North Pyongan	Yun Chung-u	윤청우	Old	Not	—	—	—	—	—	—	—	—	—	—	—
73	North Pyongan	Chong No-sik	종노식	Old	Not	—	Member	—	—	—	—	—	—	—	—	Member
74	North Pyongan	Chong Chil-song	종칠송	Old	Not	—	—	—	—	—	—	Alternate	—	—	—	—
75	North Pyongan	Cho In-guk	조인국	New	Not	—	—	—	—	—	—	—	—	—	—	—
76	North Pyongan	Choe Yong-gon	최용건	Old	Reelected	—	Chairman	—	—	—	—	Member	Member	Member	—	—
77	North Pyongan	Ha Ang-chon	하앙촌	New	Reelected	—	Member	—	—	—	—	Member	—	—	—	—
78	North Pyongan	Han In-sok	한인석	New	Not	—	—	Member	—	—	—	—	—	—	—	—
79	North Pyongan	Han Chon-jong	한천종	New	Not	Member	—	—	—	—	—	Member	—	—	—	—
80	North Pyongan	Hyon Hun	현현	Old	Not	—	—	—	Member	—	—	—	—	—	—	—
81	Chagang	Kim Ki-jun	김기준	New	Not	—	—	—	—	—	—	—	—	—	—	—
82	Chagang	Kim Pyong-son	김평손	New	Not	—	—	—	—	—	—	—	—	—	—	—
83	Chagang	Kim Sang-chol	김상철	Old	Not	—	—	—	Member	—	—	Member	—	—	—	—
84	Chagang	Kim Wa-ryong	김와룡	New	Not	—	—	—	—	—	—	—	—	—	—	—
85	Chagang	Kim Yong-jin	김용진	New	Not	—	—	Member	—	—	—	Member	—	—	—	—
86	Chagang	Kim Il-son	김일손	Old	Not	—	—	—	—	—	—	—	—	—	—	—
87	Chagang	Yi Man-su	이만수	Old	Not	—	—	—	—	—	—	—	—	—	—	—
88	Chagang	Yi Hyo-sun	이효선	New	Reelected	—	—	—	—	Chairman	—	Member	Alternate	—	Member	—
89	Chagang	Yim Taek	임택	Old	Not	—	—	—	—	—	—	—	—	—	—	—
90	Chagang	Pak Chang-sik	박창식	Old	Not	—	—	—	—	Member	—	—	—	—	—	Member
91	Chagang	Sin Hong-ye	신홍예	New	Not	—	—	—	—	Member	—	—	—	—	—	—
92	Chagang	Chong Il-yong	종일용	Old	Reelected	V Premier	—	—	—	—	—	Member	Member	Member	—	—
93	Chagang	Choe Kwang	최광	Old	Reelected	—	—	—	—	—	—	Alternate	—	—	—	—
94	South Hwanghae	Ku Cha-song	구차송	New	Not	—	—	—	—	—	—	—	—	—	—	—
95	South Hwanghae	Kim Tok-yong	김독용	New	Not	—	—	—	—	—	—	Member	—	—	—	—
96	South Hwanghae	Kim Sang-sin	김상신	New	Not	—	—	—	—	—	—	—	—	—	—	—
97	South Hwanghae	Kim Won-gyu	김원규	New	Not	—	—	—	—	—	—	—	—	—	—	—
98	South Hwanghae	Kim Ung-gi	김웅기	Old	Not	Member	—	—	—	—	—	Member	—	—	—	—
99	South Hwanghae	Kim Chong-hyok	김종혁	New	Not	—	—	—	—	—	—	—	—	—	—	—
100	South Hwanghae	Kim Chang-jun	김창준	Old	Purged	—	—	—	—	—	—	—	—	—	—	—
101	South Hwanghae	Kim Hae-jin	김혜진	Old	Not	—	—	—	—	—	—	—	—	—	—	—
102	South Hwanghae	Yi Sang-chun	이상춘	New	Not	—	—	—	—	—	—	—	—	—	—	—
103	South Hwanghae	Yi Chu-yon	리주연	Old	Reelected	V Premier	—	—	—	—	—	—	—	—	—	Chairman
104	South Hwanghae	Pak Kwi-nyo	박귀뇨	New	Not	—	—	—	—	—	—	—	—	—	—	—
105	South Hwanghae	Mun Man-uk	문만욱	New	Not	Member	—	—	—	—	—	Member	—	—	—	—
106	South Hwanghae	Pak Mun-gyu	박문규	Old	Reelected	Member	Member	—	—	—	—	Member	—	—	—	—
107	South Hwanghae	Pak Chong-ae	박정애	Old	Reelected	Member	Member	—	—	—	—	Member	Member	Member	—	—
108	South Hwanghae	Paek Nam-un	백남운	Old	Reelected	—	—	—	Member	—	—	Alternate	—	—	—	—
109	South Hwanghae	Sin Nam-chol	신남철	Old	Not	—	—	Member	—	—	—	—	—	—	—	—
110	South Hwanghae	Sin Chung-sun	신청선	New	Reelected	—	—	—	—	—	—	—	—	—	—	—
111	South Hwanghae	An Tal-su	안탈수	New	Reelected	—	—	—	—	—	—	—	—	—	—	—
112	South Hwanghae	Yu Man-ok	유만옥	New	Reelected	—	—	—	—	—	—	—	—	—	—	—
113	South Hwanghae	Yu Chol-mok	유철목	New	Not	Member	—	Member	—	—	—	Alternate	—	—	—	—
114	South Hwanghae	Chon Tae-hwan	전태환	New	Not	—	—	—	Member	—	—	—	—	—	—	—
115	South Hwanghae	Chong Song-on	종송온	Old	Reelected	Member	—	—	—	—	—	Member	—	—	—	—
116	South Hwanghae	Choe Won-taek	최원택	Old	Reelected	—	—	—	—	—	—	Member	—	—	—	—
117	South Hwanghae	Han Kwan-ok	한관옥	New	Not	—	—	—	—	—	—	—	—	—	—	—
118	North Hwanghae	Kim Pyong-je	김평제	Old	Reelected	—	Member	—	—	—	—	—	—	—	—	—
119	North Hwanghae	Kim Il	김일	Old	Reelected	FV Premier	—	—	—	—	—	Member	Member	—	—	—
120	North Hwanghae	Kim Hwang-il	김황일	Old	Not	—	—	—	—	—	—	Member	—	—	—	—
121	North Hwanghae	Yi Kwon-mu	이권무	New	Not	—	—	—	—	—	—	Member	—	—	—	—
122	North Hwanghae	Yi Rim	이림	New	Not	—	—	—	—	—	—	Member	—	—	—	—
123	North Hwanghae	Yi Sok-nam	이석남	New	Reelected	—	—	—	—	—	—	—	—	—	—	—
124	North Hwanghae	Yi Si-ha	이시하	New	Not	—	—	—	—	—	—	—	—	—	—	—
125	North Hwanghae	Yi Chan-hwa	이찬 화	New	Reelected	—	—	—	—	—	—	—	—	—	—	—
126	North Hwanghae	Yi Chang-do	이창도	New	Reelected	—	—	—	—	—	—	—	—	—	—	—
127	North Hwanghae	Son Chol	손철	New	Not	—	—	—	—	—	—	—	—	—	—	—
128	North Hwanghae	Song Pong-uk	송퐁욱	Old	Not	Member	—	—	Chairman	—	—	Member	—	—	—	—
129	North Hwanghae	O Ki-sop	오기섭	Old	Purged	—	—	—	—	—	—	Member	—	—	—	—
130	North Hwanghae	Cho Song-mo	조송모	New	Not	—	—	—	—	—	—	—	—	—	—	Member
131	North Hwanghae	Chu Sang-su	추상수	New	Reelected	—	—	—	—	—	—	—	—	—	—	—
132	North Hwanghae	Han Kil-yong	한길용	New	Not	—	—	—	—	—	—	—	—	—	—	—
133	North Hwanghae	Ho Pin	호핀	New	Not	—	—	—	—	—	Member	Member	—	—	—	—
134	North Hwanghae	Hyon Chil-chong	현칠종	New	Purged	—	V. Chairman	—	—	—	—	—	—	—	—	Member
135	North Hwanghae	Hwang Chol	황철	New	Not	—	—	—	—	—	—	—	—	—	—	—
136	Kangwon	Kang Tok-yo	강톡요	New	Reelected	—	—	—	—	—	—	—	—	—	—	—
137	Kangwon	Kim Myong-gyun	김명균	New	Not	—	—	—	—	—	—	—	—	—	—	—
138	Kangwon	Kim Won-bong	金元鳳	Old	Not	—	V. Chairman	—	—	—	—	Member	—	—	—	—
139	Kangwon	Kim Chon-hae	김천해	New	Not	—	Member	—	—	—	—	Member	—	—	—	—
140	Kangwon	To Pong-sop	토퐁섭	New	Not	—	—	—	—	—	—	—	—	—	—	—
141	Kangwon	Yi Kye-san	이계산	New	Reelected	—	—	—	—	—	—	—	—	—	—	—
142	Kangwon	Ri Jong-ok	리종옥	New	Reelected	V Premier	—	—	—	—	—	Member	Alternate	—	—	—
143	Kangwon	Yi Hong-yol	이홍열	Old	Not	—	—	—	—	Member	—	—	—	—	—	—
144	Kangwon	Mun Tae-hwa	문태화	New	Not	—	—	—	Member	—	—	—	—	—	—	—
145	Kangwon	Pang Hak-se	방학세	Old	Not	Member	—	—	—	—	—	Member	—	—	—	—
146	Kangwon	O Che-yong	오체용	New	Not	—	—	—	—	—	—	—	—	—	—	—
147	Kangwon	Yu Kyong-su	유경수	New	Not	—	—	—	—	—	—	Member	—	—	—	—
148	Kangwon	Yu Kwang-yol	유광열	New	Not	—	—	—	—	—	—	—	—	—	—	—
149	Kangwon	Chong Un-bok	종운복	New	Not	—	—	—	—	—	—	—	—	—	—	—
150	Kangwon	Choe Chae-ha	최채하	New	Not	Member	—	—	—	—	—	—	—	—	—	—
151	Kangwon	Choe Chong-hak	최종학	New	Purged	—	—	Member	—	—	—	—	—	—	—	—
152	Kangwon	Choe Hyon	최현	New	Reelected	Member	—	—	—	—	—	Member	—	—	—	—
153	South Hamgyong	Kang Cho-sun	강조선	New	Reelected	—	—	—	—	—	—	—	—	—	—	—
154	South Hamgyong	Ko Hui-man	고휘만	Old	Not	Member	—	—	—	—	—	Alternate	—	—	—	—
155	South Hamgyong	Kim Tal-hyon	김달현	Old	Purged	Member	—	—	—	—	—	—	—	—	—	—
156	South Hamgyong	Kim Mun-gum	김문검	New	Not	—	—	—	Member	—	—	—	—	—	—	—
157	South Hamgyong	Kim Pyong-je	김평제	Old	Purged	—	—	—	—	—	—	—	—	—	—	—
158	South Hamgyong	Kim Yong-su	김용수	Old	Not	—	—	—	—	—	Member	—	—	—	—	—
159	South Hamgyong	Kim Won-bong	김원봉	New	Not	—	—	—	—	Member	—	—	—	—	—	—
160	South Hamgyong	Na Yun-chul	나윤철	Old	Not	—	—	—	—	—	—	—	—	—	—	—
161	South Hamgyong	Yi Kyu-ho	이규호	New	Not	—	—	—	—	—	—	—	—	—	—	—
162	South Hamgyong	Yi Pyong-nam	리병남	Old	Not	Member	—	—	—	—	—	—	—	—	—	—
163	South Hamgyong	Yi Pong-chun	이퐁춘	New	Not	—	—	—	—	—	—	—	—	—	—	—
164	South Hamgyong	Yi Yo-song	이요송	Old	Not	—	—	—	—	—	—	—	—	—	—	—
165	South Hamgyong	Yi Yu-min	이유민	Old	Not	—	—	Member	—	—	—	Member	—	—	—	—
166	South Hamgyong	Yi In-dong	이인동	Old	Not	—	—	—	—	—	—	Member	—	—	—	—
167	South Hamgyong	Yi Hwa-sop	이화섭	New	Not	—	—	—	—	—	—	—	—	—	—	—
168	South Hamgyong	Pak Kum-chol	박금철	New	Reelected	—	—	—	—	—	—	Member	Member	Member	—	—
169	South Hamgyong	Pak Ui-wan	박의완	New	Purged	V Premier	—	—	—	—	—	Member	Alternate	—	—	—
170	South Hamgyong	Song Chu-sik	송주식	Old	Not	—	Member	—	—	—	—	—	—	—	—	—
171	South Hamgyong	Yu Kyong-sam	유경삼	New	Not	—	—	—	—	—	—	—	—	—	—	—
172	South Hamgyong	Yun Ki-ho	윤기호	New	Not	—	—	—	—	—	—	—	—	—	—	—
173	South Hamgyong	Chon Sang-gon	전상곤	New	Not	—	—	—	—	—	—	—	—	—	—	—
174	South Hamgyong	Cho Chong-hyon	조종현	New	Not	—	—	—	—	—	—	—	—	—	—	—
175	South Hamgyong	Chu Hwang-sop	추황섭	Old	Purged	Member	—	—	—	—	—	—	—	—	—	—
176	South Hamgyong	Chin Pan-su	진반수	New	Purged	Member	—	—	—	—	—	Member	—	—	—	—
177	South Hamgyong	Choe Yong-jin	최용진	New	Reelected	Member	—	—	—	—	—	Alternate	—	—	—	—
178	South Hamgyong	Han Sol-ya	한설야	Old	Not	Member	V. Chairman	—	—	—	—	Member	—	—	—	—
179	South Hamgyong	Han Hubang-nyo	한황뇨	New	Reelected	—	—	—	—	—	—	—	—	—	—	—
180	South Hamgyong	Hyon Chong-min	현종민	New	Not	—	—	—	—	—	—	Member	—	—	—	—
181	South Hamgyong	Hong Myong-hui	홍명희	Old	Reelected	V Premier	—	—	—	—	—	—	—	—	—	—
182	South Hamgyong	Hwang Myong-jong	황명종	New	Not	—	—	—	—	—	—	—	—	—	—	—
183	North Hamgyong	Kang Tae-mu	강태무	New	Not	—	—	—	—	—	—	—	—	—	—	—
184	North Hamgyong	Kwon Yong-u	권용구	New	Reelected	—	—	—	—	—	—	—	—	—	—	—
185	North Hamgyong	Kim Pok-chin	김복진	New	Not	—	—	—	—	—	—	—	—	—	—	—
186	North Hamgyong	Kim Sang-hyok	김상혁	Old	Not	—	—	—	—	—	—	Member	—	—	—	—
187	North Hamgyong	Kim Ik-son	김익손	New	Reelected	—	—	Chairman	—	—	—	Member	—	—	Chairman	—
188	North Hamgyong	Kim Chang-man	김창만	New	Reelected	—	—	—	—	—	Chairman	Member	Alternate	Member	—	—
189	North Hamgyong	Kim Tae-gun	김태군	New	Reelected	Member	—	—	—	Member	—	Alternate	—	—	—	—
190	North Hamgyong	Kim Hu-nam	김후남	New	Not	—	—	—	—	—	—	—	—	—	—	—
191	North Hamgyong	Kim Hung-il	김정일	New	Reelected	—	—	—	—	—	—	—	—	—	—	—
192	North Hamgyong	Nam Il	남일	Old	Reelected	V Premier	—	—	—	—	—	Member	Member	—	—	—
193	North Hamgyong	Yu Yong-jun	유용준	Old	Not	—	—	—	—	—	—	—	—	—	—	—
194	North Hamgyong	Yi Kuk-no	이극로	Old	Reelected	—	V. Chairman	—	—	—	—	—	—	—	—	—
195	North Hamgyong	Yi Ki-sok	리기석	Old	Not	—	—	—	—	—	—	—	—	—	—	—
196	North Hamgyong	Yi Nam-yon	이남연	New	Not	—	—	—	—	—	—	—	—	—	—	—
197	North Hamgyong	Pak Yong-tae	박용태	New	Not	—	—	—	—	Member	—	—	—	—	—	—
198	North Hamgyong	Paek Saeng-gum	백생검	New	Not	—	—	—	—	—	—	—	—	—	—	—
199	North Hamgyong	Song Ul-su	송울수	Old	Not	—	—	—	—	—	—	Member	—	—	—	—
200	North Hamgyong	Choe Pong-su	최봉수	Old	Not	—	—	—	—	—	—	—	—	—	—	—
201	North Hamgyong	Han Sang-du	한상두	New	Reelected	Member	Member	—	—	—	—	Member	—	—	—	—
202	North Hamgyong	Ho Song-taek	허성택	Old	Not	Member	—	—	—	—	—	Member	—	—	V. Chairman	—
203	North Hamgyong	Ho Jong-suk	허정숙	Old	Not	Member	—	—	—	—	—	Member	—	—	—	—
204	North Hamgyong	Hwang Sun-chon	황순촌	New	Not	—	—	—	Member	—	—	—	—	—	—	—
205	North Hamgyong	Hwang Chung-op	황청업	New	Reelected	—	—	—	—	—	—	—	—	—	—	—
206	Ryanggang	Ko Kyong-in	고경인	Old	Not	—	—	—	—	—	Member	Alternate	—	—	—	—
207	Ryanggang	Kim Pyong-yon	김병련	New	Not	—	—	—	—	—	—	—	—	—	—	—
208	Ryanggang	Yim Hae	임해	New	Not	Member	—	—	—	—	—	Member	Member	—	—	—
209	Ryanggang	Song Chang-nyom	송참렴	New	Reelected	—	—	—	Member	—	—	—	—	—	—	—
210	Ryanggang	Chon Sung-do	전승도	New	Not	—	—	—	—	—	—	—	—	—	—	—
211	Ryanggang	Cho Yong	조영	Old	Not	—	—	Member	—	—	—	Member	—	—	—	—
212	Ryanggang	Chu Yun-yop	추윤엽	New	Not	—	—	—	—	—	—	—	—	—	—	—
213	Kaesong City	Kim Myong-ho	김명호	New	Reelected	—	—	—	—	—	—	—	—	—	—	—
214	Kaesong City	Chong Nak-son	정락선	New	Not	—	—	—	—	—	—	—	—	—	—	—
215	Kaesong City	Ho Hak-song	허학송	New	Reelected	—	—	Member	—	—	—	—	—	—	Member	—

== Demographic of deputies ==
=== By age ===
Age	%
17-29	2.0%
30-39	16.0%
40-49	46.0%
50-59	25.1%
Total	100.0%

=== By education ===
Attained education	%
College	27.9%
Junior college	7.9%
Middle school	20.0%
People's school	44.1%
Total	100.0%

=== By class ===
Class	%
Laborers	39.1%
Farmers	31.6%
Intellectuals	27.9%
Businessmen	1.4%
Total	100.0%
