= 4th Central Committee of the Workers' Party of Korea =

4th Central Committee
- Emblem of the Workers' Party of North Korea

18 September 1961 – 13 November 1970 (9 years, 56 days) Overview
- Type: Central Committee of the Workers' Party of Korea
- Election: 4th Congress

Leadership
- General Secretary: Kim Il Sung
- Vice Chairmen: Choe Yong-gon; Pak Chong-ae; Pak Kum-chol; Chong Il-yong; Kim Chang-man
- Political Committee: 15 full 13 candidates
- Secretariat: 11 members
- Inspection organ: 7 members

Members
- Total: 87

Candidates
- Total: 50

The 4th Central Committee of the Workers' Party of Korea (WPK) was elected at the 4th Congress on 18 September 1961. and remained in session until the election of the 5th Central Committee on 13 November 1970. In between party congresses and specially convened conferences the Central Committee is the highest decision-making institution in the WPK and North Korea. The Central Committee is not a permanent institution and delegates day-to-day work to elected bodies, such as the Political Committee, the Secretariat and the Inspection Committee in the case of the 4th Central Committee. It convenes meetings, known as "Plenary Session of the [term] Central Committee", to discuss major policies. Only full members have the right to vote, but if a full member cannot attend a plenary session, the person's spot is taken over by an alternate. Plenary session can also be attended by non-members, such meetings are known as "Enlarged Plenary Session", to participate in the committee's discussions.

== Plenums ==
Plenum	Start–end	Length	Agenda of the plenum
1st Plenary Session	18 September 1961	1 day	1 item.: Election of officers and apparatus heads of the 4th Central Committee.
2nd Enlarged Plenary Session	27 November – 1 December 1961	5 days	5 items.: Report from WPK officials attending the 22nd Congress of the Communist Party of the Soviet Union.; On the economic plan for 1962.; On the construction of 600,000 residential buildings in the countryside.; Election of Hyon Mu-gwang as a Candidate Member of the 4th Political Committee.; Concluding remarks by Kim Il-sung, known as "All Efforts for the Conquering of Six Highlands".
3rd Enlarged Plenary Session	6–8 March 1962	2 days	3 items.: Debate on the South Hwanghae Provincial Committee's work in line with instructions from Kim Il-sung.; On improving the party thought education.; Concluding speech by Kim Il-sung, known as "On Improving and Strengthening the Organisational and Ideological Work of the Party".
4th Plenary Session	Not disclosed.	Not disclosed.	Not disclosed.
5th Plenary Session	10–14 December 1962	5 days	2 items: On strengthening national defence in light of the current situation.; Review of the 1962 economic plan and debate concerning the economic plan for 1963.
6th Plenary Session	13–15 May 1963	3 days	2 items.: On strengthening the party committees work in factories and industries.; On improving the Qianlima movement.
7th Plenary Session	3–5 September 1963	3 days	2 items.: Preliminary report on the 1963 economic plan.; On improving the animal husbandry sector.
8th Plenary Session	25–27 February 1964	3 days	4 items.: Report by Kim Il-sung, known as "Theses on the Socialist Agrarian Questions in our Country".; The situation in South Korea and our work on how to achieve the unification of the fatherland.; On strengthening the masses' work; Concluding speech by Kim Il-sung, known as "Let Us Strengthen the Revolutionary Forces in Every Way to Achieve the Cause of Reunification of the Country".
9th Plenary Session	25–26 June 1964	2 days	3 items.: On the convening of the Conference for the Agrarian Workers of Korea.; Debate on the reorganisation of the trade union, the General Federation of Trade Unions of Korea.; Concluding remarks by Kim Il-sung, known as "On Improving and Strengthening the Work of the Working People's Organisations".
10th Plenary Session	14–19 December 1964	6 days	3 items.: Preliminary report on the economic plan for 1964.; Debate on policies so as to achieve the targets of the 1965 economic plan.; Concluding speech by Kim Il-sung, known as "On Enhancing the Party Spirit, Class Spirit, and Popular Spirit of Leading Functionaries and Improving the Management of the National Economy".
11th Plenary Session	29 June – 1 July 1965	3 day	3 items.: Report by Kim Il, known as "On the Revision and Strengthening of Power and Electricity Management".; Report by Kim Chang-man, known as "On the Revision and Strengthening of Higher Education and Scientific Research Projects".; Concluding remarks by Kim Il-sung.
12th Plenary Session	15–17 November 1965	3 days	1 item.: Report by Kim Il-sung, known as "On Further Strengthening of the Party Leadership in All Sectors of the People's Economy and the County Party Committees".
13th Plenary Session	28 March – 4 April 1966	8 days	2 items.: Preliminary Report on the implementation of decisions made at the 12th Plenary Session.; Report by Kim Kwang-hyop, known as "On the Convocation of the Second Party Conference".
14th Plenary Session	12 October 1966	1 day	2 items.: Adoption of the decisions made at the 2nd Conference.; Reorganisation of the party leadership; Abolishing of the office of Chairman of the WPK Central Committee and its replacement by the office of General Secretary of the WPK Central Committee.; Kim Il-sung is elected to the office of General Secretary of the WPK Central Committee.; Abolishing of the office of Vice Chairman of the WPK Central Committee and its replacement by the office of Secretary of the WPK Central Committee.; Choe Yong-gon, Kim Il, Pak Kum-chol, Yi Hyo-sum, Kim Kwang-hyop, Sok San, Ho Pong-hak, Kim Yong-ju, Pak Yong-guk and Kim To-man are elected as secretaries of the WPK Central Committee, and together form the WPK Secretariat with Kim Il-sung as General Secretary of the WPK Central Committee.; Election to the Political Committee; Kim Il-sung, Choe Yong-gon, Kim Il, Pak Kum-chol, Yi Hyo-sun, Kim Kwang-hyop, Kim Ik-son, Kim Chang-bong, Pak Song-chol, Choe Hyon and Yi Ying-ho are elected to the 4th Political Committee; Sok San, Ho Pong-hak, Choe Kwang, O Chin-u, Yim Chun-chu, Kim Tong-gyu, Kim Yong-ju, Pak Yong-guk and Chong Kyong-bok are elected as candidate members of the 4th Political Committee.
15th Plenary Session	4–8 May 1967	5 days	Not disclosed.: More than 100 people were expelled from the party for involvement in the Kapsan faction incident.; Pak Kum-chol was sent work in the countryside, and either committed suicide or sentenced to death for disobedience to Kim Il-sung.; The following Members and Candidate Members of the 4th Political Committee were expelled and sentenced to death for disobedience to Kim Il-sung: Yi Hyo-sun, Kim To-man, Pak Yong-guk, and Ho Sok-son.
16th Plenary Session	28 June – 3 July 1967	6 days	No agenda.: Debate on the realising of decisions of the 2nd Conference.; Concluding speech by Kim Il-sung, known as "For a Great Revolutionary Upsurge in the Present Economic Work and for the Improvement and Strengthening of Manpower Administration".
17th Plenary Session	22–25 April 1968	4 days	2 items.: On the economic plan for 1968 to further strengthen the economic and military sectors.; On further improving the animal husbandry sector.
18th Plenary Session	11–16 November 1968	6 days	3 items.: Report by Kim Il, known as "On the Strengthening of the Railway Transportation and the General Transportation Works, Particularly the Automobile Transport Works".; Debate on the interim report of the decisions of the 16th Plenary Session on labour administration and the efficient utilisation of the 8-hour work-day.; Concluding speech by Kim Il-sung, known as "On Relieving the strain on Transport".
19th Plenary Session	27–30 June 1969	3 days	3 items.: On reducing wasteful spending and preserving state properties.; On the reform in the fishing industries sector.; Concluding speech by Kim Il-sung, known as "On the Thrift and Care of State Properties and On the Further Development of Fisheries".
20th Plenary Session	1–5 December 1969	6 days	3 items.: On strengthening the work of the League of Socialist Working Youth of Korea.; On strengthening the party leadership role in educational work.; On the convocation of the 5th Congress.

== Members ==
=== Full ===
Rank	Name Hangul	Level of government (Offices held)	3rd CC	5th CC	Inner-composition		
Rank	Name Hangul	Level of government (Offices held)	3rd CC	5th CC	4th POL	4th SEC	4th INS
1	Kim Il Sung	Central: General Secretary of the WPK Central Committee (1966–70); Chairman of the WPK Central Committee (1961–66)	Old	Reelected	Member	Gen. Sec.	—
2	Choe Yong-gon	—	Old	Reelected	Member	Secretary	—
3	Kim Il	—	Old	Reelected	Member	Secretary	—
4	Pak Kum-chol	—	Old	Expelled	Member	Secretary	—
5	Kim Chang-man	—	Old	Expelled	Member	—	—
6	Yi Hyo-sun	—	Old	Expelled	Member	Secretary	—
7	Pak Chong-ae	—	Old	Demoted	Member	—	—
8	Kim Kwang-hyop	—	Old	Demoted	Member	Secretary	—
9	Chong Il-yong	—	Old	Demoted	Member	—	—
10	Nam Il	—	Old	Reelected	Member	—	—
11	Yi Chong-ok	—	Old	Demoted	Member	—	—
12	Kim Ik-son	—	Old	Demoted	Member	—	Chairman
13	Yi Chu-yon	—	New	Died	Candidate	—	—
14	Ha Ang-chon	—	Old	Demoted	Candidate	—	—
15	Han Sang-du	—	Old	Demoted	Candidate	—	—
16	Chong Chun-taek	—	Old	Reelected	—	—	—
17	So Chol	—	Candidate	Reelected	—	—	—
18	Choe Hyon	—	Old	Reelected	Member	—	—
19	Sok San	—	Candidate	Demoted	Candidate	Secretary	—
20	Kim Kyong-sok	—	Old	Demoted	—	—	—
21	Kim Chang-bong	—	Candidate	Expelled	—	—	—
22	Ho Pong-hak	—	New	Expelled	Candidate	Secretary	—
23	Choe Yong-jin	—	Candidate	Reelected	—	—	—
24	Pak Song-chol	—	New	Reelected	Member	—	—
25	O Chin-u	—	Candidate	Reelected	Candidate	—	—
26	Chon Mun-sop	—	Candidate	Reelected	—	—	—
27	Han Sol-ya	—	Old	Demoted	—	—	—
28	Yi Yong-ho	—	Old	Demoted	Member	—	—
29	Chon Chang-chol	—	New	Reelected	—	—	—
30	Yi Song-un	—	Old	Demoted	—	—	—
31	Choe Kwang	—	Candidate	Expelled	Candidate	—	—
32	An Yong	—	New	Demoted	—	—	—
33	Han Ik-su	—	New	Reelected	—	—	—
34	Kim Tae-hong	—	New	Reelected	—	—	—
35	Kang Chin-gon	—	Old	Demoted	—	—	—
36	Choe Won-taek	—	Old	Reelected	—	—	—
37	Paek Nam-un	—	Candidate	Reelected	—	—	—
38	Yi Il-gyong	—	New	Reelected	—	—	—
39	Kang Yong-chang	—	Old	Demoted	—	—	—
40	Kim Tong-gyu	—	New	Reelected	Candidate	—	—
41	Kim Yong-ju	—	New	Reelected	Candidate	Secretary	—
42	Pak Yong-guk	—	Candidate	Expelled	Candidate	Secretary	—
43	Kim To-man	—	Candidate	Expelled	—	Secretary	—
44	Hyon Mu-gwang	—	Old	Reelected	—	—	—
45	Kim Tae-gun	—	Candidate	Reelected	—	—	—
46	Kim Man-gum	—	Old	Reelected	—	—	—
47	Chong Tu-hwan	—	Candidate	Demoted	—	—	—
48	Ko Hyok	—	New	Demoted	—	—	—
49	Kang Hui-won	—	New	Reelected	—	—	—
50	No Su-ok	—	Old	Demoted	—	—	—
51	Pak Yong-sun	—	New	Reelected	—	—	—
52	Kim Wal-yong	—	New	Demoted	—	—	—
53	Choe Ki-chol	—	New	Demoted	—	—	—
54	O Paek-yong	—	New	Reelected	—	—	—
55	Yang Kun-ok	—	New	Reelected	—	—	—
56	Sin Tae-sik	—	New	Demoted	—	—	—
57	Kim Chong-hang	—	New	Demoted	—	—	—
58	Yim Kye-chol	—	New	Demoted	—	—	—
59	Pak Se-chang	—	New	Demoted	—	—	—
60	Pak Mun-gyu	—	Old	Reelected	—	—	—
61	Kwon Yong-tae	—	New	Demoted	—	—	—
62	Kim Pyong-sik	—	New	Demoted	—	—	—
63	O Hyon-ju	—	New	Demoted	—	—	—
64	Kim Hoe-il	—	New	Reelected	—	—	—
65	Kim Chang-dok	—	Old	Demoted	—	—	V. Chairman
66	Ho Sok-son	—	New	Demoted	—	—	—
67	Yim Ok-sun	—	New	Demoted	—	—	—
68	Yim Chol	—	New	Reelected	—	—	—
69	Choe Min-chol	—	New	Demoted	—	—	—
70	Kim Chwa-hyok	—	New	Reelected	—	—	—
71	Chi Pyong-hak	—	New	Reelected	—	—	—
72	Yi Chang-su	—	New	Demoted	—	—	—
73	Ho Hak-song	—	New	Demoted	—	—	—
74	O Che-ryong	—	New	Demoted	—	—	—
75	Yim Chin-gyu	—	New	Demoted	—	—	—
76	Yi Chae-yun	—	New	Demoted	—	—	—
77	Pi Chang-nin	—	New	Reelected	—	—	—
78	Yi Chae-yong	—	New	Demoted	—	—	—
79	Yi Kwang-sil	—	New	Demoted	—	—	—
80	No Yong-sam	—	New	Demoted	—	—	—
81	Chong Chi-hwan	—	New	Demoted	—	—	—
82	Chae Hui-jong	—	New	Demoted	—	—	—
83	No Ik-myong	—	New	Demoted	—	—	—
84	Yi Puk-myong	—	Candidate	Demoted	—	—	—
85	O Tong-uk	—	New	Demoted	—	—	—
86	Yim Chun-chu	—	New	Reelected	Candidate	—	—
87	Chong Kyong-bok	—	New	Demoted	Candidate	—	—

=== Candidate ===
Rank	Name Hangul	3rd CC	5th CC				
Rank	Name Hangul	3rd CC	5th CC	1	Paek Hak-nim	New	Full
2	Kim Chung-nin	New	Full				
3	Han Tae-yong	New	Demoted				
4	Choe Chang-sok	New	Demoted				
5	Kim Ung-sang	New	Demoted				
6	Pak Ung-gol	New	Demoted				
7	Choe Chae-u	New	Full				
8	No Tae-sok	New	Full				
9	Song Chang-nyom	New	Demoted				
10	Kim Kwan-sop	New	Candidate				
11	Yi Kun-mo	New	Full				
12	O Tae-bong	New	Full				
13	Yi Myon-sang	New	Full				
14	Hwang Won-bo	New	Demoted				
15	Yom Tae-jun	New	Full				
16	An Sung-hak	New	Full				
17	Yu Chang-gwon	New	Demoted				
18	Kim Tae-hyon	New	Demoted				
19	Chang Yun-pil	New	Full				
20	Paek Son-il	New	Candidate				
21	Tae Pyong-yol	New	Full				
22	Pak Tae-jin	New	Demoted				
23	Pak U-sop	New	Demoted				
24	Chong Pyong-gap	New	Demoted				
25	Choe Chong-gon	New	Candidate				
26	Yom Sang-gi	New	Demoted				
27	Kim Song-gun	New	Demoted				
28	Yi Yang-suk	New	Demoted				
29	Yi Kuk-chin	New	Demoted				
30	Yi Tok-hyon	New	Demoted				
31	Choe Hak-son	New	Demoted				
32	Hwang Sun-hui	New	Full				
33	Pak Hyong-suk	New	Demoted				
34	Yom Ui-jae	New	Demoted				
35	Yi Yong-sun	New	Demoted				
36	Kim Myong-gon	New	Demoted				
37	Yi Hong-gyun	New	Candidate				
38	Yun Chang-sun	New	Demoted				
39	Han Kyong-suk	New	Demoted				
40	Song Pok-ki	New	Full				
41	Kim Yong-sok	New	Demoted				
42	Kim Hong-gwan	New	Candidate				
43	Kim Ki-du	New	Demoted				
44	Kim Pyong-sam	New	Candidate				
45	Pak In-hyok	New	Demoted				
46	Kim Hyong-sam	New	Demoted				
47	Hong Won-gil	New	Full				
48	Yang Chung-gyom	New	Candidate				
49	Yi Chi-chan	Candidate	Full				
50	Kim Pyong-su	New	Demoted				
