= 4th Cabinet of North Korea =

- State Emblem

16 December 1967 – 26 December 1972 (5 years, 10 days) Overview
- Type: Plenary Meeting of the Cabinet of North Korea
- Election: 1st Session of the 4th Supreme People's Assembly

Members
- Total: 21

The 4th Cabinet of North Korea was elected by the 1st Session of the 4th Supreme People's Assembly on 16 December 1967. It was replaced on 26 December 1972 by the 5th Administrative Council.

== Members ==
Rank	Office	Name	Hangul	Took office	Left office	Duration	3rd CAB	5th ADC
1	Premier of the Cabinet	Kim Il Sung	김일성	16 December 1967	26 December 1972	5 years and 10 days	Old	Promoted
2	First Vice Premier of the Cabinet	Kim Il	김일	16 December 1967	26 December 1972	5 years and 10 days	Old	Reelected
3	Vice Premier of the Cabinet	Kim Kwang-hyop	김광협	16 December 1967	1968	16 days	Old	Not
3	Vice Premier of the Cabinet	Pak Song-chol	박성철	16 December 1967	26 December 1972	5 years and 10 days	Old	Reelected
3	Vice Premier of the Cabinet	Kim Chang-bong	김창봉	16 December 1967	1968	16 days	Old	Not
3	Vice Premier of the Cabinet	Yi Chu-yon	리주연	16 December 1967	August 1969	1 year and 228 days	Old	Not
3	Vice Premier of the Cabinet	Nam Il	남일	16 December 1967	26 December 1972	5 years and 10 days	Old	Reelected
3	Vice Premier of the Cabinet	Ri Jong-ok	리종옥	16 December 1967	26 December 1972	5 years and 10 days	Old	Reelected
3	Vice Premier of the Cabinet	Choe Yong-jin	최용진	16 December 1967	26 December 1972	5 years and 10 days	Old	Not
3	Vice Premier of the Cabinet	Chong Chun-taek	정준택	16 December 1967	26 December 1972	5 years and 10 days	Old	Reelected
4	Minister of Foreign Affairs	Pak Song-chol	박성철	16 December 1967	26 December 1972	5 years and 10 days	Old	Reelected
5	Minister of National Defence	Kim Chang-bong	김창봉	16 December 1967	26 December 1972	5 years and 10 days	Old	Not
6	Minister of Public Security	Sok San	속산	16 December 1967	26 December 1972	5 years and 10 days	Old	Not
7	Chairman of the State Planning Commission	Chong Chun-taek	정준택	16 December 1967	26 December 1972	5 years and 10 days	Old	Reelected
8	Minister of Foreign Trade	Kye Ung-thae	계웅태	16 December 1967	26 December 1972	5 years and 10 days	New	Reelected
9	Chairman of the Commission for Economic Relations with Foreign Countries	Kim Kyong-yon	김경연	16 December 1967	26 December 1972	5 years and 10 days	New	Reelected
10	Minister of Metal Industry	Kim Pyong-han	김평한	16 December 1967	26 December 1972	5 years and 10 days	New	Not
11	Minister of Mining Industry	Kim Chi-do	김치도	16 December 1967	26 December 1972	5 years and 10 days	New	Not
12	Minister of Power and Coal Industry	Kim Tae-gun	김태군	16 December 1967	26 December 1972	5 years and 10 days	Old	Not
13	Minister of Chemical Industry	Song Pok-ki	송폭기	16 December 1967	26 December 1972	5 years and 10 days	New	Not
14	Minister of the First Ministry of Machine Industry	Hyon Mu-gwang	현무광	16 December 1967	26 December 1972	5 years and 10 days	Old	Reelected
15	Minister of the Second Ministry of Machine Industry	Hong Won-gil	홍원길	16 December 1967	26 December 1972	5 years and 10 days	Old	Reelected
16	Minister of Building Material Industry	Jong Il-ryong	정일룡	16 December 1967	26 December 1972	5 years and 10 days	Old	Not
17	Minister of Forestry	Chong Tong-chol	종통철	16 December 1967	26 December 1972	5 years and 10 days	Old	Not
18	Minister of Fisheries	Kang Chom-gu	강첨구	16 December 1967	26 December 1972	5 years and 10 days	Old	Not
19	Minister of Textile and Paper Industries	Yi Yang-suk	이양숙	16 December 1967	26 December 1972	5 years and 10 days	Old	Not
20	Minister of Foodstuff and Daily Necessities Industries	Yi Ho-hyok	이호혁	16 December 1967	26 December 1972	5 years and 10 days	New	Not
21	Chairman of the Agricultural Commission	Kim Man-gum	김만검	16 December 1967	26 December 1972	5 years and 10 days	Old	Reelected
22	Chairman of the State Construction Commission	Kim Tu-sam	김투삼	16 December 1967	26 December 1972	5 years and 10 days	New	Not
23	Minister of Construction	Cho Kwan-ha	조관하	16 December 1967	26 December 1972	5 years and 10 days	New	Not
24	Minister of Railways	Kim Kap-sun	김갑선	16 December 1967	January 1969	1 year and 16 days	New	Not
25	Minister of Land and Sea Transportation	O Song-yol	오송열	16 December 1967	26 December 1972	5 years and 10 days	New	Not
26	Minister of Communications	Pak Yong-sun	박용선	16 December 1967	26 December 1972	5 years and 10 days	Old	Not
27	Minister of Finance	Yun Ki-bok	윤기복	16 December 1967	26 December 1972	5 years and 10 days	Old	Not
28	Minister of Labour	Paek Son-il	백선일	16 December 1967	26 December 1972	5 years and 10 days	Old	Not
29	Minister of City Management	Chun Mun-dok	천문독	16 December 1967	26 December 1972	5 years and 10 days	New	Not
30	Minister of Land Administration	No Pyong-u	평우없음	16 December 1967	26 December 1972	5 years and 10 days	New	Not
31	Minister of Commerce	An Sung-hak	안성학	16 December 1967	26 December 1972	5 years and 10 days	New	Not
32	Minister of Procurement and Food Administration	Pak Kwang-son	박광손	16 December 1967	26 December 1972	5 years and 10 days	New	Not
33	Chairman of the Materials Supply Commission	Han Sang-du	한상두	16 December 1967	26 December 1972	5 years and 10 days	Old	Not
34	Chairman of the State Scientific and Technological Commission	Kim Ung-sang	김웅상	16 December 1967	26 December 1972	5 years and 10 days	Old	Not
35	Minister of State Control	Kim Ik-son	김익손	16 December 1967	26 December 1972	5 years and 10 days	Old	Not
36	Minister of Higher Education	Yang Hyong-sop	양형섭	16 December 1967	26 December 1972	5 years and 10 days	New	Not
37	Minister of Common Education	Yi Chang-su	이창수	16 December 1967	26 December 1972	5 years and 10 days	New	Not
38	Minister of Culture	Pak Yong-sin	박용신	16 December 1967	26 December 1972	5 years and 10 days	Old	Not
39	Minister of Public Health	Yi Nak-bin	이낙빈	16 December 1967	26 December 1972	5 years and 10 days	New	Reelected
40	President of the Academy of Sciences	O Tong-uk	오통욱	16 December 1967	26 December 1972	5 years and 10 days	Old	Not
41	Director of the First Secretariat of the Cabinet	Choe Chae-u	최채우	16 December 1967	26 December 1972	5 years and 10 days	Old	Reelected
42	Director of the Fifth Secretariat of the Cabinet	O Tae-bong	오태봉	16 December 1967	26 December 1972	5 years and 10 days	Old	Not
43	Director of the Second Secretariat of the Cabinet	An Yong-gak	안용각	16 December 1967	26 December 1972	5 years and 10 days	Old	Not
