= 3rd Central Committee of the Workers' Party of Korea =

3rd Central Committee
- Emblem of the Workers' Party of North Korea

29 April 1956 – 18 September 1961 (5 years, 142 days) Overview
- Type: Central Committee of the Workers' Party of Korea
- Election: 3rd Congress

Leadership
- Chairman: Kim Il Sung
- Vice Chairmen: Choe Yong-gon; Pak Chong-ae; Pak Kum-chol; Jong Il-ryong; Kim Chang-man
- Standing Committee: 12 full 4 candidates
- Organisation Committee: 6 members

Members
- Total: 71

Candidates
- Total: 45

The 3rd Central Committee of the Workers' Party of Korea (WPK) was elected at the 3rd Congress on 29 April 1956, and remained in session until the election of the 4th Central Committee on 18 September 1961. In between party congresses and specially convened conferences the Central Committee is the highest decision-making institution in the WPK and North Korea. The Central Committee is not a permanent institution and delegates day-to-day work to elected bodies, such as the Standing Committee, the Organisation Committee and the Inspection Committee in the case of the 3rd Central Committee. It convenes meetings, known as "[month] Plenary Session of the Central Committee", to discuss major policies. Only full members have the right to vote, but if a full member cannot attend a plenary session, the person's spot is taken over by an alternate. Plenary session can also be attended by non-members, such meetings are known as "Enlarged Plenary Session", to participate in the committee's discussions.

== Plenums ==
Plenum	Start–end	Length	Plenum agenda
August Plenary Session	30–31 August 1956	2 days	2 items.: Report from the state delegation that had visited fraternal countries and a report on challenges facing the party (official).; On reforming and strengthening public health (official).; A loose coalition composed of officials from the Soviet Korean and the Yanan factions tried to either remove Kim Il Sung from power or at the very least persuade the party to initiate de-Stalinisation of political life (reality).
December Plenary Session	11–13 December 1956	3 days	3 items.: On the economic plan for 1957.; On the work of the Hambuk Provincial Committee on agricultural development.; Concluding speech by Kim Il-sung, known as "To Bring About a Great Revolutionary Upswingin Socialist Construction".
April Plenary Session	18–19 April 1957	2 days	2 items.: Report by Kim Il Sung, known as "On Further Development of Fisheries".; Decision made on solving basic problems of food, housing and clothing during the First Five-Year Plan.
October Plenary Session	17–19 October 1957	3 days	3 items.: Report by Pak Kum-chol, known as "On the Revision of the Basic Construction Projects".; Debate on the convening of the 1st Conference of Representatives.; Concluding speech by Kim Il-sung, known as "On Carrying Out the Party Policy in the Construction Sector".
December Enlarged Plenary Session	5–6 December 1957	2 days	1 item: Report by Kim Il-sung, known as "On the Work of the Party and Government Delegation Which Attended the Celebration of the Fortieth Anniversary of the Great October Revolution and the Meetings of Representatives of the Communist and Workers' Parties of Various Countries in Moscow".
June Plenary Session	5–7 June 1958	3 days	3 items.: On strengthening the foodstuff manufacturing sector and the production of daily necessities.; Debate on changing and strengthening the domestic industries and foreign trade.; Concluding remarks by Kim Il-sung, known as "On Expanding the Production of People's Consumer Goods and Reforming the Merchandise Exchange Works".
September Plenary Session	26–27 September 1958	2 days	2 items.: On increasing the number of irrigated fields for agriculture.; Debate on promoting the development of the metal industry.
February Plenary Session	23–25 February 1959	3 days	5 items.: Report by Kim Il-sung, known as "Participation of the Workers' Party of Korea in the twenty-first congress of the Communist Party of the Soviet Union".; Debate on how to improve the quality of manufactured goods and industries.; Debate on improving the quality of transport and transportation.; Debate on the party's various projects.; Concluding remarks by Kim Il-sung.
June Plenary Session	27–30 June 1959	4 days	2 items.: On developing animal husbandry.; On the further promotion of electrical industries.
December Enlarged Plenary Session	1–4 December 1959	5 days	4 items.: On the economic plan for 1960.; Concerning the strengthening of local party organisations.; On the realising of the all-people's economic movement.; Concluding remarks by Kim Il-sung, known as "On Several Tasks Confronting the Socialist Economic Construction".
April Plenary Session	21 April 1960	1 day	2 items.: An appeal to the South Korean people, known as "To the People of South Korea".; Concerning the April Revolution.
August Enlarged Plenary Session	8–11 August 1960	4 days	3 items.: On the technical revolution movement occurring in the North Korean economy.; On improving the training programs for technical personnel.; Concluding speech by Kim Il-sung, known as "For the Successful Accomplishment of the Technical Revolution".
December Enlarged Plenary Session	20–23 December 1960	4 days	3 items.: General Report on the management of agriculture in 1960 and tasks for 1961.; On the 1961 economic plan.; On the Conference of Representatives of the Workers' Party of Korea and other communist organisations.
March Plenary Session	20–22 March 1961	2 days	3 items.: On the convocation of the 4th Congress.; On realising the decisions reached at the June 1958 Plenary Session.; On further improving basic construction projects of each sector.

== Members ==
=== Full ===
Rank	Name Hangul	Level of government (Offices held)	2nd CC	4th CC	Inner-composition		
Rank	Name Hangul	Level of government (Offices held)	2nd CC	4th CC	3rd STC	3rd ORG	3rd INS
1	Kim Il Sung	Central: Chairman of the WPK Central Committee	Old	Reelected	Member	Member	—
2	Kim Tu-bong	Central	Old	Demoted	Member	—	—
3	Choe Yong-gon	Central	Old	Reelected	Member	Member	—
4	Pak Chong-ae	Central	Old	Reelected	Member	Member	—
5	Kim Il	Central	Old	Reelected	Member	—	—
6	Pak Kum-chol	Central	Old	Reelected	Member	Member	—
7	Pak Chang-ok	Central	Old	Demoted	—	—	—
8	Choe Chang-ik	Central	Old	Demoted	Member	—	—
9	Pak Ui-wan	Central	New	Demoted	Candidate	—	—
10	Jong Il-ryong	Central	Old	Reelected	Member	Member	—
11	Han Sang-du	Central	New	Reelected	—	—	—
12	Ha Ang-chon	Central	New	Reelected	—	—	—
13	Kim Hwang-il	Central	New	Demoted	—	—	—
14	Pak Hun-il	Central	Old	Demoted	—	—	—
15	Yi Hyo-sun	Central	New	Reelected	Candidate	—	Member
16	Pak Il-yong	Central	New	Demoted	—	—	—
17	Yi Il-yong	Central	New	Reelected	—	—	—
18	Han Sol-ya	Central	Old	Reelected	—	—	—
19	So Hui (North Korea)	Central	New	Demoted	—	—	—
20	Yim Hae	Central	Old	Demoted	Member	—	—
21	Kim Chon-hae	Central	New	Demoted	—	—	—
22	Yi Chong-ok	Central	New	Reelected	Candidate	—	—
23	Nam Il	Central	Old	Reelected	Member	—	—
24	Chong Chun-taek	Central	Old	Reelected	—	—	—
25	Chin Pan-su	Central	Old	Demoted	—	—	—
26	Pang Hak-se	Central	Old	Demoted	—	—	—
27	Kim Chang-man	Central	New	Reelected	Candidate	Member	—
28	Yu Chuk-un	Central	New	Demoted	—	—	—
29	Kim Hoe-il	Central	New	Reelected	—	—	—
30	Mun Man-uk	Central	New	Demoted	—	—	—
31	Chong Song-on	Central	New	Demoted	—	—	—
32	Ho Song-taek	Central	New	Demoted	—	—	V. Chairman
33	Pak Mun-gyu	Central	New	Reelected	—	—	—
34	Ho Chong-suk	Central	Old	Demoted	—	—	—
35	Kim Sung-hwa	Central	Old	Demoted	—	—	—
36	Kang Yong-chang	Central	New	Reelected	—	—	—
37	Kim Kwang-hyop	Central	Old	Reelected	Member	—	—
38	Choe Hyon	Central	Old	Reelected	—	—	—
39	Choe Chang-hak	Central	New	Demoted	—	—	—
40	Han Il-mu	Central	Old	Demoted	—	—	—
41	Yi Kwon-mu	Central	Old	Demoted	—	—	—
42	Yu Kyong-su	Central	New	Demoted	—	—	—
43	Yi Rim	Central	New	Demoted	—	—	—
44	Kim Kyong-sok	Central	Old	Reelected	—	—	—
45	Yi Yong-ho	Central	New	Reelected	—	—	—
46	Kim Chang-dok	Central	New	Reelected	—	—	—
47	Kim Yong-jin	Central	New	Demoted	—	—	—
48	Hyon Chong-min	Central	New	Demoted	—	—	—
49	Ko Pong-gi	Central	Candidate	Demoted	—	—	—
50	Cho Yong	Central	Old	Demoted	—	—	—
51	Ri Yu-min	Central	Old	Demoted	—	—	—
52	Song Pong-uk	Central	New	Demoted	—	—	—
53	Yi Song-un	Central	Old	Reelected	—	—	—
54	Kim Tok-yong	Central	New	Demoted	—	—	—
55	Kim Man-gum	Central	New	Reelected	—	—	—
56	Yi In-dong	Central	New	Demoted	—	—	—
57	O Ki-sop	Central	Old	Demoted	—	—	—
58	Kang Chin-gon	Central	Old	Reelected	—	—	—
59	Kim Won-bong	Central	New	Demoted	—	—	—
60	Choe Won-taek	Central	Old	Reelected	—	—	—
61	Ho Pin	Central	New	Demoted	—	—	—
62	Han Chon-jong	Central	New	Demoted	—	—	—
63	Kim Tu-sam	Central	New	Demoted	—	—	—
64	Kim Sang-hyok	Central	Old	Demoted	—	—	—
65	Kim Ik-son	Central	New	Reelected	—	—	Chairman
66	Song Ul-su	Central	Old	Demoted	—	—	—
67	Kim Chik-hyong	Central	New	Demoted	—	—	—
68	Yun Kong-hum	Central	New	Demoted	—	—	—
69	Pak Mu	Central	Old	Demoted	—	—	—
70	Kim Sang-chol	Central	Old	Demoted	—	—	—
71	Kim Ung-gi	Central	Old	Demoted	—	—	—

=== Candidate ===
Rank	Name Hangul	2nd CC	4th CC				
Rank	Name Hangul	2nd CC	4th CC	1	Yu Chol-mok	New	Demoted
2	Kim Tae-gun	New	Full				
3	Pak Yong-guk	New	Full				
4	Kang Tok-il	New	Demoted				
5	Chong Tu-hwan	New	Demoted				
6	So Chun-sik	New	Demoted				
7	Yang Kye	New	Demoted				
8	Choe Chol-hwan	New	Demoted				
9	Yi Tal-chin	New	Demoted				
10	Paek Hong-gwon	New	Demoted				
11	Chong Yon-pyo	New	Demoted				
12	Choe Il	New	Demoted				
13	Yi Chae-chon	New	Demoted				
14	O Tong-uk	New	Full				
15	Yi Chong-won	New	Demoted				
16	Chang Ha-il	New	Demoted				
17	Yi Mun-il	New	Demoted				
18	Kim Hyon-bong	New	Demoted				
19	Ko Hui-man	New	Demoted				
20	Sok San	New	Full				
21	O Chin-u	New	Full				
22	Chang Pyong-san	New	Demoted				
23	Choe Kwang	New	Full				
24	Kim Pong-yul	New	Demoted				
25	Choe Yong-jin	New	Full				
26	Yi Pil-gyu	New	Demoted				
27	Cho Hun	New	Demoted				
28	Kim Chang-bong	New	Full				
29	Choe Son-gyu	New	Demoted				
30	Pak Kwang-hui	New	Demoted				
31	Choe Ton-gun	New	Demoted				
32	Chong Chil-song	New	Demoted				
33	Yi Chi-chan	New	Candidate				
34	Yi Chon-ho	New	Demoted				
35	Kim Chol-u	New	Demoted				
36	Yu Chol-sung	New	Demoted				
37	Paek Sun-jae	New	Demoted				
38	Yi Tae-hwa	New	Demoted				
39	Yi Sang-jo	New	Demoted				
40	So Chol	New	Demoted				
41	Ho Kuk-bong	New	Demoted				
42	Yi Kyu-hwan	New	Demoted				
43	Yi Puk-myong	New	Full				
44	Paek Nam-un	New	Full				
45	Ko Kyong-in	New	Demoted				
