= 3rd Cabinet of North Korea =

North Korean officials

- State Emblem

23 October 1962 – 16 December 1967 (5 years, 54 days) Overview
- Type: Plenary Meeting of the Cabinet of North Korea
- Election: 1st Session of the 3rd Supreme People's Assembly

Members
- Total: 21

The 3rd Cabinet of North Korea was elected by the 1st Session of the 3rd Supreme People's Assembly on 23 October 1962. It was replaced on 16 December 1967 by the 4th Cabinet.

== Members ==
Rank	Office	Name	Hangul	Took office	Left office	Duration	2nd CAB	4th CAB
1	Premier of the Cabinet	Kim Il Sung	김일성	23 October 1962	16 December 1967	5 years and 54 days	Old	Reelected
2	First Vice Premier of the Cabinet	Kim Il	김일	23 October 1962	16 December 1967	5 years and 54 days	Old	Reelected
3	Vice Premier of the Cabinet	Kim Kwang-hyop	김광협	23 October 1962	16 December 1967	5 years and 54 days	Old	Reelected
3	Vice Premier of the Cabinet	Kim Chang-man	김창만	23 October 1962	10 January 1966	3 years and 79 days	New	Not
3	Vice Premier of the Cabinet	Jong Il-ryong	정일룡	23 October 1962	4 December 1964	2 years and 42 days	Old	Reelected
3	Vice Premier of the Cabinet	Nam Il	남일	23 October 1962	16 December 1967	5 years and 54 days	Old	Reelected
3	Vice Premier of the Cabinet	Ri Jong-ok	리종옥	23 October 1962	16 December 1967	5 years and 54 days	Old	Reelected
3	Vice Premier of the Cabinet	Yi Chu-yon	리주연	23 October 1962	16 December 1967	5 years and 54 days	Old	Reelected
3	Vice Premier of the Cabinet	Chong Chun-taek	정준택	23 October 1962	16 December 1967	5 years and 54 days	Old	Reelected
3	Vice Premier of the Cabinet	Choe Yong-jin	최용진	July 1964	16 December 1967	3 years and 138 days	Old	Reelected
3	Vice Premier of the Cabinet	Ko Hyok	고혁	September 1966	16 December 1967	1 year and 77 days	New	Reelected
3	Vice Premier of the Cabinet	Pak Song-chol	박성철	October 1966	16 December 1967	1 year and 77 days	Old	Reelected
3	Vice Premier of the Cabinet	Kim Chang-bong	김창봉	October 1966	16 December 1967	1 year and 77 days	New	Reelected
4	Minister of Defence	Kim Kwang-hyop	김광협	23 October 1962	16 December 1967	5 years and 54 days	Old	Reelected
5	Minister of Public Security	Sok San	속산	23 October 1962	16 December 1967	5 years and 54 days	Old	Reelected
6	Minister of Foreign Affairs	Pak Song-chol	박성철	23 October 1962	16 December 1967	5 years and 54 days	Old	Reelected
7	Chairman of the State Planning Commission	Chong Chun-taek	정준택	23 October 1962	16 December 1967	5 years and 54 days	Old	Reelected
8	Chairman of the State Construction Commission	Nam Il	남일	23 October 1962	16 December 1967	5 years and 54 days	Old	Reelected
9	First Vice Chairman of the State Construction Commission	Kim Ung-sang	김웅상	23 October 1962	16 December 1967	5 years and 54 days	New	Reelected
10	Chairman of the State Scientific and Technological Commission	O Tong-uk	오통욱	23 October 1962	16 December 1967	5 years and 54 days	Old	Reelected
11	Chairman of the Light Industry Commission	Pak Yong-song	박용송	23 October 1962	January 1964	1 year and 70 days	New	Not
12	Chairman of the Agricultural Commission	Kim Man-gum	김만검	23 October 1962	16 December 1967	5 years and 54 days	Old	Reelected
13	Minister of Metal and Chemical Industries	Ri Jong-ok	리종옥	23 October 1962	November 1964	2 years and 9 days	Old	Reelected
14	Minister of Power and Coal Industries	Chong Il-yong	정일룡	23 October 1962	4 December 1964	2 years and 42 days	Old	Reelected
14	Minister of Power and Coal Industries	Kim Tae-gun	김태군	4 December 1964	16 December 1967	3 years and 12 days	Old	Reelected
15	Minister of Machine Industry	Cho Tong-sop	조통섭	23 October 1962	30 July 1963	280 days	New	Not
15	Minister of Machine Industry	Hyon Mu-gwang	현무광	4 December 1964	16 December 1967	3 years and 12 days	New	Reelected
16	Minister of Fisheries	Choe Yong-jin	최용진	23 October 1962	March 1963	129 days	Old	Reelected
16	Minister of Fisheries	Kang Chom-gu	강첨구	March 1963	16 December 1967	4 years and 260 days	New	Reelected
17	Minister of Forestry	Chong Tong-chol	종통철	23 October 1962	16 December 1967	5 years and 54 days	New	Reelected
18	Minister of City and Industry Construction	Kim Pyong-sik	김병식	23 October 1962	8 January 1963	77 days	Old	Not
19	Minister of Rural Construction	Kim Pyong-sik	김병식	23 October 1962	8 January 1963	77 days	Old	Not
20	Minister of Transportation	Kim Hoe-il	김회일	23 October 1962	4 February 1964	1 year and 104 days	Old	Not
21	Minister of Communications	Pak Yong-sun	박용선	23 October 1962	16 December 1967	5 years and 54 days	New	Reelected
22	Minister of Finance	Han Sang-du	한상두	23 October 1962	16 December 1967	5 years and 54 days	Old	Reelected
23	Minister of Commerce	Kim Se-bong	김세봉	23 October 1962	16 December 1967	5 years and 54 days	Old	Not
24	Minister of Procurement and Food Administration	Han Tae-yong	한태용	23 October 1962	16 December 1967	5 years and 54 days	Old	Not
25	Minister of Foreign Trade	Yi Il-gyong	이일경	23 October 1962	3 April 1964	1 year and 163 days	Old	Not
25	Minister of Foreign Trade	Yi Chu-yon	리주연	3 April 1964	16 December 1967	3 years and 257 days	Old	Reelected
26	Minister of Labour	Paek Son-il	백선일	23 October 1962	16 December 1967	5 years and 54 days	New	Reelected
27	Minister of Interior	Pak Mun-gyu	박문규	23 October 1962	3 April 1964	1 year and 163 days	Old	Not
28	Minister of City Management	Yom Tae-jun	염태준	23 October 1962	3 April 1964	1 year and 163 days	New	Not
29	Minister of Higher Education	Kim Chong-hang	김종항	23 October 1962	16 December 1967	5 years and 54 days	Old	Not
30	Minister of Common Education	Yun Ki-bok	윤기복	23 October 1962	16 December 1967	5 years and 54 days	Old	Reelected
31	Minister of Culture	Pak Ung-gol	박웅골	23 October 1962	September 1966	3 years and 313 days	Old	Not
31	Minister of Culture	Pak Yong-sin	박용신	September 1966	16 December 1967	1 year and 77 days	New	Reelected
32	Minister of Public Health	Choe Chang-sok	최창석	23 October 1962	16 December 1967	5 years and 54 days	Old	Not
—	Minister of Building Materials Industry	Kim Pyong-sik	김병식	8 January 1963	January 1965	1 year and 359 days	Old	Not
—	Minister of Building Materials Industry	Kim Ung-sang	김웅상	January 1965	16 December 1967	2 years and 319 days	New	Reelected
—	Minister of Chemical Industry	Song Pok-ki	송폭기	January 1965	16 December 1967	2 years and 319 days	New	Reelected
—	Minister of Land Administration	Pak Mun-gyu	박문규	3 April 1964	16 December 1967	3 years and 257 days	Old	Not
—	Minister of Metal Industries	Yi Chae-yong	이채용	January 1965	16 December 1967	2 years and 319 days	New	Reelected
—	Chairman of the Machine Industry Commission	Hyon Mu-gwang	현무광	30 July 1963	4 December 1964	1 year and 127 days	New	Reelected
—	First Minister of Machine Industry	Hyon Mu-gwang	현무광	30 January 1967	16 December 1967	320 days	New	Reelected
—	Second Minister of Machine Industry	Hong Won-gil	홍원길	30 January 1967	16 December 1967	320 days	New	Reelected
—	Minister of Railways	Kim Hoe-il	김회일	4 February 1964	June 1966	2 years and 117 days	Old	Not
—	Railway Transportation Commission	Choe Yong-jin	최용진	4 February 1964	17 November 1965	1 year and 286 days	Old	Reelected
—	Director of the 1st Secretariat of the Cabinet	Choe Chae-u	최채우	23 October 1962	16 December 1967	5 years and 54 days	Old	Reelected
—	Director of the 2nd Secretariat of the Cabinet	An Yong-gak	안용각	4 December 1964	16 December 1967	3 years and 12 days	New	Reelected
—	Director of the 5th Secretariat of the Cabinet	O Tae-bong	오태봉	23 October 1962	16 December 1967	5 years and 54 days	New	Reelected
—	Minister of State Control	Kim Ik-son	김익손	September 1966	16 December 1967	1 year and 77 days	Old	Reelected
—	Chairman of the State Light Industry Commission	Yim Kye-chol	임계철	January 1964	10 January 1966	1 year and 345 days	Old	Reelected
—	Vice Chairman of the State Light Industry Commission	Mun Man-uk	문만욱	January 1964	10 January 1966	1 year and 345 days	Old	Reelected
—	Minister of Textile and Paper Industries	Yi Yang-suk	이양숙	30 January 1967	16 December 1967	320 days	Old	Reelected
