= 1957 North Korean parliamentary election =

- 27 August 1957

All 215 seats in the Supreme People's Assembly
- Turnout: 99.99%
Party	Seats	+/–
Workers' Party of Korea	178	+21
Korean Democratic Party	11	−24
Chondoist Chongu Party	11	−24
This lists parties that won seats. See the complete results below.
Premier before	Premier after
Kim Il Sung; Workers' Party	Kim Il Sung; Workers' Party

Parliamentary elections were held in North Korea on 27 August 1957 to elect members of the 2nd Supreme People's Assembly. Voters were presented with a single list from the Democratic Front for the Reunification of the Fatherland, dominated by the Workers' Party of Korea.

Only one candidate was presented in each constituency, all of which were selected by the WPK, although some ran under the banner of other parties or state organisations to give the illusion of democracy. Voter turnout was reported to be 99.99%, with 99.92% reportedly voting in favour of the candidates presented.

Its first session took place on 18–20 September 1957. One of its declarations was "On the Immediate Tasks of the People's Power in Socialist Construction".

== Results ==
Party or alliance		Votes	%	Seats
Fatherland Front	Workers' Party of Korea		99.92	178
Fatherland Front	Chondoist Chongu Party		99.92	11
Fatherland Front	Korean Democratic Party		99.92	11
Fatherland Front	Laboring People's Party		99.92	3
Fatherland Front	People's Republic Party		99.92	3
Fatherland Front	Buddhist Alliance		99.92	2
Fatherland Front	Gonmin People's Alliance		99.92	1
Fatherland Front	Democratic Independent Party		99.92	1
Fatherland Front	Other parties		99.92	5
Against			0.08	–
Total				215
Registered voters/turnout			99.99	
Source: Nohlen et al., East Gate Book

== Composition of deputies ==
The following were elected as members of parliament:

=== Pyongyang city ===
1. Kim Kwang-hyop
2. Kim Tu-bong
3. Kim Myong-jun
4. Yi Nam-i
5. Yi Song-un
6. Yi Chong-suk
7. Pak Yong-sop
8. Pak Yong-sin
9. Yu Song-hun
10. Chong Yon-pyo
11. Chu Pyong-son
12. Choe Kyong-hwi
13. Choe Sang-hwa
14. Hong Ki-hwang

=== South Pyongan ===
15. Kang Yang-uk
16. Kang Chun-guk
17. Kang Chin-gon
18. Kim Tu-sam
19. Kim Nak-hui
20. Kim Man-gum
21. Kim Il Sung
22. Kim Chang-dok
23. Yu Su-yon
24. Yu Chuk-un
25. Yu Hyon-gyu
26. Yi Ki-yong
27. Yi Man-gyu
28. Yi Yong
29. Yi Il-gyong
30. Yi Chae-chon
31. Yi Chong-man
32. Yim Kun-sang
33. Pak To-hwa
34. Pak Mu
35. Pak Song-guk
36. Pak Yong-guk
37. Song Yong
38. Yun Pong-jin
39. Yun Chi-il
40. Chang Yun-pil
41. Chang Pyong-san
42. Chang Hae-u
43. Chong Tu-hwan
44. Chong Chun-taek
45. Choe Tu-chan
46. Choe Sung-hui
47. Choe Chol-hwan
48. Han Il-mu
49. Han Tong-baek
50. Hong Chung-sik

=== North Pyongan ===
51. Kang Yong-chang
52. Kye Ung-sang
53. Ko Chun-taek
54. Kwon O-gil
55. Kim Tuk-nan
56. Kim Sok-yong
57. Kim Song-mun
58. Kim Se-yul
59. Kim Hoe-il
60. Na Sung-gyu
61. Yang Sin-yong
62. No Yong-se
63. Yi Tong-hwa
64. Yi Myon-sang
65. Yi Sung-gi
66. Yi Chon-ho
67. So Chun-sik
68. Sin Pong-hyon
69. An Pyong-su
70. O Han-sang
71. Won Hong-gu
72. Yun Chung-u
73. Jong Ro-sik
74. Chong Chil-song
75. Cho In-guk
76. Choe Yong-gon
77. Ha Ang-chon
78. Han In-sok
79. Han Chon-jong
80. Hyon Hun

=== Chagang ===
81. Kim Ki-jun
82. Kim Pyong-son
83. Kim Sang-chol
84. Kim Wa-ryong
85. Kim Yong-jin
86. Kim Il-son
87. Yi Man-su
88. Yi Hyo-sun
89. Yim Taek
90. Pak Chang-sik
91. Sin Hong-ye
92. Chong Il-yong
93. Choe Kwang

=== South Hwanghae ===
94. Ku Cha-song
95. Kim Tok-yong
96. Kim Sang-sin
97. Kim Won-gyu
98. Kim Ung-gi
99. Kim Chong-hyok
100. Kim Chang-jun
101. Kim Hae-jin
102. Yi Sang-chun
103. Yi Chu-yon
104. Pak Kwi-nyo
105. Mun Man-uk
106. Pak Mun-gyu
107. Pak Chong-ae
108. Paek Nam-un
109. Sin Nam-chol
110. Sin Chung-sun
111. An Tal-su
112. Yu Man-ok
113. Yu Chol-mok
114. Chon Tae-hwan
115. Chong Song-on
116. Choe Won-taek
117. Han Kwan-ok

=== North Hwanghae ===
118. Kim Pyong-je
119. Kim Il
120. Kim Hwang-il
121. Yi Kwoon-mu
122. Yi Rim
123. Yi Sok-nam
124. Yi Si-ha
125. Yi Chan-hwa
126. Yi Chang-do
127. Son Chol
128. Song Pong-uk
129. O Ki-sop
130. Cho Song-mo
131. Chu Sang-su
132. Han Kil-yong
133. Ho Pin
134. Hyon Chil-chong
135. Hwang Chol

=== Kangwon ===
136. Kang Tok-yo
137. Kim Myong-gyun
138. Kim Won-bong
139. Kim Chon-hae
140. To Pong-sop
141. Yi Kye-san
142. Yi Chong-ok
143. Yi Hong-yol
144. Mun Tae-hwa
145. Pang Hak-se
146. O Che-yong
147. Yu Kyong-su
148. Yu Kwang-yol
149. Chong Un-bok
150. Choe Chae-ha
151. Choe Chong-hak
152. Choe Hyon

=== South Hamgyong ===
153. Kang Cho-sun
154. Ko Hui-man
155. Kim Tal-hyon
156. Kim Mun-gum
157. Kim Pyong-je
158. Kim Yong-su
159. Kim Won-bong
160. Na Yun-chul
161. Yi Kyu-ho
162. Yi Pyong-nam
163. Yi Pong-chun
164. Yi Yo-song
165. Ri Yu-min
166. Yi In-dong
167. Yi Hwa-sop
168. Pak Kum-chol
169. Pak Ui-wan
170. Song Chu-sik
171. Yu Kyong-sam
172. Yun Ki-ho
173. Chon Sang-gon
174. Cho Chong-hyon
175. Chu Hwang-sop
176. Chin Pan-su
177. Choe Yong-jin
178. Han Sol-ya
179. Han Hubang-nyo
180. Hyon Chong-min
181. Hong Myong-hui
182. Hwang Myong-jong

=== North Hamgyong ===
183. Kang Tae-mu
184. Kwon Yongu
185. Kim Pok-chin
186. Kim Sang-hyok
187. Kim Ik-son
188. Kim Chang-man
189. Kim Tae-gun
190. Kim Hu-nam
191. Kim Hung-il
192. Nam Il
193. Yu Yong-jun
194. Yi Kuk-no
195. YiKi-sok
196. Yi Nam-yon
197. Pak Yong-tae
198. Paek Saeng-gum
199. Song Ul-su
200. Choe Pong-su
201. Han Sang-du
202. Ho Song-taek
203. Ho Chong-suk
204. Hwang Sun-chon
205. Hwang Chung-op

=== Ryanggang ===
206. Ko Kyong-in
207. Kim Pyong-yon
208. Yim Hae
209. Song Chang-nyom
210. Kim Sung-do
211. Cho Yong
212. Chu Yun-yop

=== Kaesong city ===
213. Kim Myong-ho
214. Chong Nak-son
215. Ho Hak-song
