= 2nd Cabinet of North Korea =

- State Emblem

18 September 1957 – 23 October 1962 (5 years, 35 days) Overview
- Type: Plenary Meeting of the Cabinet of North Korea
- Election: 1st Session of the 2nd Supreme People's Assembly

Members
- Total: 21

The 2nd Cabinet of North Korea was elected by the 1st Session of the 2nd Supreme People's Assembly on 20 September 1957. It was replaced on 23 October 1962 by the 3rd Cabinet.

== Members ==
Rank	Office	Name	Hangul	Took office	Left office	Duration	1st CAB	3rd CAB
1	Premier of the Cabinet	Kim Il Sung	김일성	18 September 1957	23 October 1962	5 years and 35 days	Old	Reelected
2	First Vice Premier of the Cabinet	Kim Il	김일	January 1959	23 October 1962	3 years and 265 days	Old	Reelected
3	Vice Premier of the Cabinet	Kim Il	김일	18 September 1957	January 1959	1 year and 105 days	Old	Reelected
3	Vice Premier of the Cabinet	Hong Myong-hui	홍명희	18 September 1957	23 October 1962	5 years and 35 days	Old	Not
3	Vice Premier of the Cabinet	Jong Il-ryong	정일룡	18 September 1957	23 October 1962	5 years and 35 days	Old	Reelected
3	Vice Premier of the Cabinet	Nam Il	남일	18 September 1957	23 October 1962	5 years and 35 days	Old	Reelected
3	Vice Premier of the Cabinet	Pak Ui-wan	박의완	18 September 1957	March 1958	164 days	Old	Not
3	Vice Premier of the Cabinet	Chong Chun-taek	정준택	18 September 1957	23 October 1962	5 years and 35 days	Old	Reelected
3	Vice Premier of the Cabinet	Yi Chu-yon	리주연	March 1958	23 October 1962	4 years and 206 days	Old	Reelected
3	Vice Premier of the Cabinet	Ri Jong-ok	리종옥	January 1960	23 October 1962	2 years and 265 days	Old	Reelected
3	Vice Premier of the Cabinet	Kim Kwang-hyop	김광협	20 October 1960	23 October 1962	2 years and 3 days	New	Reelected
4	Minister of National Defence	Kim Kwang-hyop	김광협	18 September 1957	23 October 1962	5 years and 35 days	New	Not
5	Minister of Interior	Pang Hak-se	방학세	18 September 1957	November 1960	3 years and 44 days	Old	Not
5	Minister of Interior	Sok San	속산	November 1960	23 October 1962	1 year and 327 days	New	Not
6	Minister of Foreign Affairs	Nam Il	남일	18 September 1957	23 October 1959	2 years and 35 days	Old	Reelected
6	Minister of Foreign Affairs	Pak Song-chol	박성철	23 October 1959	23 October 1962	3 years and 0 days	New	Reelected
7	Minister of Justice	Ho Jong-suk	허정숙	18 September 1957	31 August 1959	1 year and 347 days	Old	Not
8	Minister of State Control	Pak Mun-gyu	박문규	18 September 1957	May 1959	1 year and 225 days	Old	Reelected
9	Chairman of the State Planning Commission	Ri Jong-ok	리종옥	18 September 1957	July 1959	1 year and 286 days	Old	Reelected
9	Chairman of the State Planning Commission	Kim Kye-chol	김계철	July 1959	December 1960	1 year and 123 days	New	Reelected
9	Chairman of the State Planning Commission	Chong Chun-taek	정준택	December 1960	23 October 1962	1 year and 296 days	Old	Reelected
10	Chairman of the State Construction Commission	Pak Ui-wan	박의완	18 September 1957	December 1957	74 days	Old	Not
10	Chairman of the State Construction Commission	Kim Ung-san	김웅산	December 1957	August 1960	2 years and 214 days	New	Not
10	Chairman of the State Construction Commission	Nam Il	남일	August 1960	23 October 1962	2 years and 53 days	Old	Not
11	Minister of Metal Industry	Kang Yong-chang	강영창	18 September 1957	September 1958	348 days	Old	Not
11	Minister of Metal Industry	Han Sang-du	한상두	September 1958	4 April 1960	1 year and 187 days	New	Not
12	Minister of Machine Industry	Jong Il-ryong	정일룡	18 September 1957	February 1958	136 days	Old	Reelected
12	Minister of Machine Industry	Choe Chae-u	최채우	February 1958	4 April 1960	2 years and 36 days	New	Reelected
13	Minister of Coal Industry	Ho Song-taek	허성택	18 September 1957	September 1958	348 days	Old	Not
13	Minister of Coal Industry	Kim Tae-gun	김태군	September 1958	31 August 1959	4 years and 23 days	New	Not
14	Minister of Chemical Industry	Yi Chon-ho	리천호	18 September 1957	31 August 1959	1 year and 347 days	Old	Not
15	Minister of Agriculture	Han Chon-jong	한천종	18 September 1957	July 1959	1 year and 286 days	New	Not
15	Minister of Agriculture	Kim Man-gum	김만검	July 1959	August 1960	1 year and 1 day	New	Not
15	Minister of Agriculture	Yim Hae	임해	August 1960	September 1961	1 year and 1 day	New	Not
15	Minister of Agriculture	Pak Chong-ae	박정애	October 1961	23 October 1962	1 year and 23 days	New	Not
16	Minister of Electric Powers	Kim Tu-sam	김두삼	18 September 1957	31 August 1959	1 year and 347 days	Old	Not
17	Minister of Light Industry	Mun Man-uk	문만욱	18 September 1957	4 April 1960	2 years and 199 days	Old	Not
18	Minister of Fisheries	Chu Hwang-sop	주황섭	18 September 1957	September 1958	348 days	Old	Not
18	Minister of Fisheries	Yu Chol-mok	유철목	September 1958	31 August 1959	335 days	New	Not
18	Minister of Fisheries	Choe Yong-jin	최용진	27 December 1960	23 October 1962	1 year and 296 days	New	Not
19	Minister of Transportation	Kim Hoe-il	김회일	18 September 1957	23 October 1962	5 years and 35 days	Old	Reelected
20	Minister of Construction and Building Materials Industry	Choe Chae-ha	최재하	18 September 1957	October 1958	1 year and 13 days	Old	Not
20	Minister of Construction and Building Materials Industry	Kim Pyong-sik	김병식	October 1958	8 November 1958	8 days	Old	Not
21	Minister of Finance	Yi Chu-yon	리주연	18 September 1957	April 1958	195 days	Old	Reelected
21	Minister of Finance	Song Pong-uk	송퐁욱	April 1958	August 1960	2 years and 93 days	New	Reelected
21	Minister of Finance	Han Sang-du	한상두	August 1960	23 October 1962	2 years and 53 days	New	Reelected
22	Minister of Internal and External Commerce	Chin Pan-su	진반수	18 September 1957	29 September 1958	1 year and 11 days	Old	Not
23	Minister of Communications	Ko Chun-taek	고춘택	18 September 1957	April 1958	195 days	New	Not
23	Minister of Communications	Choe Hyon	최현	April 1958	23 October 1962	4 years and 176 days	New	Not
24	Minister of Education and Culture	Han Sol-ya	한설야	18 September 1957	September 1958	348 days	Old	Not
24	Minister of Education and Culture	Yi Il-gyong	이일경	September 1958	29 April 1960	1 year and 212 days	New	Not
25	Minister of Public Health	Yi Pyong-nam	리병남	18 September 1957	23 October 1959	2 years and 35 days	Old	Not
25	Minister of Public Health	Choe Chang-sok	최창석	23 October 1959	23 October 1962	3 years and 0 days	New	Not
26	Minister of Labour	Kim Ung-gi	김웅기	18 September 1957	31 August 1959	1 year and 347 days	New	Not
26	Minister of Labour	Yang Tae-gun	양태군	28 February 1961	23 October 1962	1 year and 237 days	New	Not
27	Minister of Rural Management	Chong Song-on	정성언	18 September 1957	23 October 1962	5 years and 35 days	Old	Not
28	Minister without Portfolio	Kim Tal-hyon	김달현	18 September 1957	March 1959	1 year and 164 days	Old	Not
28	Minister without Portfolio	Hong Ki-hwang	홍기황	18 September 1957	March 1959	1 year and 164 days	New	Not
—	Minister of Commerce	Chin Pan-su	진반수	29 September 1958	May 1959	214 days	Old	Not
—	Minister of Commerce	Chong Tu-hwan	종투환	May 1959	May 1960	336 days	New	Not
—	Minister of Commerce	Han Tae-yong	한태용	May 1960	February 1962	1 year and 246 days	New	Not
—	Minister of Commerce	Yi Yang-suk	이양숙	July 1962	August 1962	1 day	New	Not
—	Minister of Commerce	Kim Se-bong	김세봉	August 1962	23 October 1962	53 days	New	Not
—	Minister of Common Education	Yi Il-gyong	김세봉	1 January 1961	November 1961	304 days	New	Not
—	Minister of Common Education	Yun Ki-bok	윤기복	August 1962	23 October 1962	53 days	New	Not
—	Minister of Construction	Kim Pyong-sik	김병식	21 January 1961	23 October 1962	1 year and 275 days	New	Not
—	Minister of Culture	Pak Ung-gol	박웅골	21 January 1961	23 October 1962	1 year and 275 days	New	Not
—	Minister of Forestry	Ko Chun-taek	고춘택	24 April 1958	September 1958	130 days	Old	Not
—	Minister of Forestry	Ko Hui-man	고휘만	September 1958	29 April 1960	1 year and 212 days	New	Not
—	Minister of Forestry	Song Chang-yom	송창염	27 December 1960	23 October 1962	1 year and 300 days	New	Not
—	Minister of Foreign Trade	Yim Hae	임해	29 September 1958	August 1960	1 year and 307 days	New	Not
—	Minister of Foreign Trade	Yi Chu-yon	리주연	August 1960	November 1961	1 year and 62 days	Old	Not
—	Minister of Foreign Trade	Yi Il-gyong	이일경	November 1961	23 October 1962	327 days	New	Not
—	Minister of Higher Education	Kim Chong-hang	김종항	29 April 1960	23 October 1962	2 years and 177 days	New	Not
—	Chairman of the Heavy Industry Commission	Ri Jong-ok	리종옥	4 April 1960	September 1962	2 years and 150 days	Old	Not
—	Chairman of the Light Industry Commission	Chong Chun-taek	정준택	4 April 1960	27 December 1960	267 days	Old	Not
—	Chairman of the Light Industry Commission	Yim Kye-chol	임계철	27 December 1960	23 October 1962	1 year and 300 days	New	Not
—	Minister of Local Administration	Pak Mun-gyu	박문규	May 1959	31 August 1959	92 days	Old	Not
—	Minister of Metal and Chemical Industries	Ri Jong-ok	리종옥	September 1962	23 October 1962	23 days	Old	Not
—	Minister of Power and Chemical Industries	Kim Tu-sam	김두삼	31 August 1959	4 April 1960	217 days	Old	Not
—	Procurement and Food Administration	Chong Song-on	정성언	November 1958	31 August 1959	274 days	Old	Not
—	Procurement and Food Administration	Han Tae-yong	한태용	11 July 1962	23 October 1962	104 days	New	Not
—	Minister of Rural Construction	Kim Pyong-ik	김평일	1 September 1961	23 October 1962	1 year and 52 days	New	Not
—	Minister of Rural Management	Chong Song-on	정성언	3 August 1957	8 November 1958	1 year and 97 days	Old	Not
—	Director Secretariat of the Cabinet	Choe Chae-u	최채우	August 1962	23 October 1962	53 days	New	Not
—	Chairman of the State Scientific and Technological Commission	O Tong-uk	오통욱	11 July 1962	23 October 1962	104 days	New	Reelected
