= 4th Congress of the Workers' Party of Korea =

1961 party conference in North Korea

- The flag of the Workers' Party of Korea
- Date: 11–18 September 1961 (7 days)
- Location: Pyongyang, North Korea
- Participants: 1,657 voting and 73 non-voting delegates
- Outcome: 4th Central Committee and 4th Central Auditing Committee

The 4th Congress of the Workers' Party of Korea (WPK), referred to by Kim Il Sung as the "Congress of Victors", was held in Pyongyang, North Korea, from 11 to 18 September 1961. The congress is the highest organ of the party, and is stipulated to be held every four years. 1,657 voting and 73 non-voting delegates represented the party's 1,311,563 members. The 4th Central Committee, elected by the congress, reelected Kim Il Sung as WPK Chairman, and a number of deputy chairmen.

== Delegates ==
1,657 voting and 73 non-voting delegates were elected to represent the party's 1,311,563 members. 32 different fraternal parties sent delegations to the 4th Congress, among these were the Communist Party of the Soviet Union (led by Frol Kozlov), the Chinese Communist Party (led by Deng Xiaoping), the Socialist Unity Party of Germany (led by Alfred Krehler) and the Japanese Communist Party (led by Kenji Miyamoto) among others.

== Congress ==
Kim Il Sung delivered a six-hour-long report on the work of the 3rd Central Committee since the 3rd Congress (held in 1956). In his report, Kim Il Sung talked about the economic accomplishments made since the 3rd Congress, the First Seven-Year Plan, Korean reunification, the party's victory over the factionalist tendencies and the international position of the WPK. A notable success of the 3rd Central Committee was the collectivization of agriculture and the nationalization of all industries had been completed, together with the fact that 52 percent of the North Korean workforce were by definition industrial workers (accomplishing the party's task of creating a proletariat). Kim Il Sung asserted that these developments had been initiated by the Chollima Movement, a Stakhanovite movement inspired mobilization campaign, in which more than 2 million workers were participating in. He then concluded his section by claiming that exploitation was non-existent in North Korea. He then went on too talk about the First Seven-Year Plan, stating it would be a continuation of the previous successful five-year plan, and that the state would continue to prioritise heavy industry while simultaneously develop light industry and agriculture. In regards to South Korea, Kim Il Sung trivialized the April Revolution which led to the overthrow of Syngman Rhee, the President of South Korea, believing it mattered little in the long run since North Korea was both stronger and more prosperous then South Korea. He then began speaking about the party's victory over the factionalists, citing that the party had grown rapidly in the last years and needed to appoint younger men to the top through the party's youth league, the League of Socialist Working Youth (LSWY). He then ended his speech by talking about the WPK's international position, stating that North Korea emphasized the importance of good relations between fraternal socialist countries (telling the Chinese and Soviet delegations that North Korea would remain neutral in the Sino–Soviet dispute).

On the congress' last day, amendments to the party's by-laws were announced. They were approved without much discussion; the numbers of chapters were reduced from ten to nine, while the number of articles increased from 62 to 70. The changes are not very noteworthy in themselves, but they clarified the relationship between the WPK and the LSWY and the Korean People's Army (KPA).

The extent of Kim Il Sung's consolidation of power became clear to all with the election of the 4th Central Committee. The congress elected 85 members to the 4th Central Committee, an increase of 14 from 71-member 3rd Central Committee. Of the 85 elected, only 28 of them had served in the 3rd Central Committee, in contrast, 57 of those elected had never served in the Central Committee before. All the partisans from the 3rd Central Committee were elected, with the exception of General Yu Kyong-su who died on 19 November 1958. Officials of the 3rd Central Committee who belonged either to the Soviet Korean or the Yanan faction were not reelected, if one excludes those members who had denounced their allegiances to these factions and pledged their allegiance to the partisans (such as Kim Chang-nam and Nam Il). Of the 57 new members, 25 of them were active in Kim Il Sung's partisan faction while approximately 21 of them were recruited from either the KPA or the LSWY. In addition, there were those who were not partisan but had family ties to partisan members, such as Kim Yong-ju (Kim Il Sung's brother) and Yi Hyo-sun (elder brother of Yi Che-sun) for instance. Partisans, those trained by the partisans and people with family ties to the partisans constituted 80 percent of the Central Committee; to make matters better for Kim Il Sung, there existed no other organized group within the Central Committee. Of the 50 candidate members elected to the 4th Central Committee, 49 were new (with Yi Chi-chan being the only reelected).

== 1st plenum of the 4th Central Committee ==
The 1st Plenary Session of the 4th Central Committee convened on 18 September 1961 to elect the officers of the 4th Central Committee. Kim Il Sung was elected the party's Chairman, while Choe Yong-gon, Kim Il, Pak Kum-chol, Kim Chang-nam and Yi Hyo-sun. Of these, only Kim Chang-nam was not a partisan. All organs of the Central Committee had either one or two partisans while concurrently holding either the post as head or deputy head; for instance, Kim Ik-son served as the chairman of the 4th Inspection Commission, but Kim Chang-dok (a partisan) served as deputy chairman.

The Central Committee ranking list:

- Kim Il Sung
- Choe Yong-gon
- Kim Il
- Pak Kum-chol
- Kim Chang-man
- Yi Hyo-sun
- Pak Chong-ae
- Kim Kwang-hyop
- Chong Il-yong
- Nam Il
- Yi Chong-ok
- Kim Ik-son
- Yi Chu-yon
- Ha Ang-chon
- Han Sang-du
- Chong Chun-taek
- So Chol
- Choe Hyon
- Sok San
- Kim Kyong-sok

== Plenums of the 4th Central Committee ==
- 1st plenary session (18 September 1961)
- 2nd plenary session (27 November-1 December 1961)
- 3rd plenary session (6-8 March 1962)
- 4th plenary session (2-8 August 1962)
- 5th plenary session (10-14 December 1962)
- 6th plenary session (13-15 May 1963)
- 7th plenary session (3-5 September 1963)
- 8th plenary session (25-27 February 1964)
- 9th plenary session (25-26 June 1964)
- 10th plenary session (14-19 December 1964)
- 11th plenary session (29 June-1 July 1965)
- 12th plenary session (15-17 November 1965)
- 13th plenary session (28 March-4 April 1966)
- 14th plenary session (12 October 1966)
- 15th plenary session (4-8 May 1967)
- 16th plenary session (28 June-3 July 1967)
- 17th plenary session (22-25 April 1968)
- 18th plenary session (11-16 November 1968)
- 19th plenary session (27-30 June 1969)
