= Yi Ho-hyok =

North Korean politician (fl. 20th century)

Yi Ho-hyok was a North Korean politician (Communist).

She served as Minister of Foodstuff and Daily Necessities Industries from 1967 to 1972.
