= 5th Congress of the Workers' Party of Korea =

1970 party conference in North Korea

- The flag of the Workers' Party of Korea
- Date: 2–13 November 1970 (11 days)
- Location: Pyongyang, North Korea
- Participants: 1,734
- Outcome: 5th Central Committee and 5th Central Auditing Committee

The 5th Congress of the Workers' Party of Korea took place from 2 to 13 November 1970.

At the time, there were approximately 1.6 million party members—around 13% of the population. Of these, 1,734 attended the congress. During the event, Kim Il Sung delivered a report introducing the "Three Revolutions" (ideological, technological, and cultural) and the "Six-Year National Economic Plan (1971–1976)".

The WPK's 5th Central Committee held 19 plenary meetings between 1970 and 1980. At the 1st Plenary Session on 13 November 1970, Kim Il Sung was appointed General Secretary, alongside the formation of a 15-member Political Committee and a 9-member Secretariat. The 8th Plenary Session in February 1974 designated Kim Jong Il as Kim Il Sung's successor.

It was announced that the previous Seven-Year Plan had been completed, and a new Six-Year Plan would be launched. The new Central Committee comprised 117 full (voting) members and 55 alternate (candidate) members. The Politburo was reduced from 29 members (as per the Second Party Conference) to 15, including 11 full and 4 alternate members. Additionally, 10 secretaries were appointed to coordinate various Central Committee activities, including Kim Il Sung.

== "Three revolutions" ==
The concept of the "Three Revolutions" (Samdaehyeokmyeong, 三大革命) was first introduced at this congress. It categorized revolution into three areas: ideological, technological, and cultural. These revolutions were presented as ongoing processes required to achieve a complete communist society.

=== Technological revolution ===
The technological revolution (3대기술혁명, 三大技術革命) outlined three primary objectives:

- Eliminating the gap between heavy and light labor,
- Removing the distinction between industrial and agricultural work,
- Relieving women from excessive domestic labor.

=== Ideological revolution ===
The ideological revolution aimed to develop individuals suited to communist society. This was to be achieved through structured organizational activities and ideological education.

=== Cultural revolution ===
The cultural revolution was defined as efforts to establish a socialist culture. These efforts often took the form of organizing "Three Revolutions" small groups (sojo, 소조, 小組). The first "Three Revolutions Small Group Movement" (삼대혁명소조운동) was launched in 1973. Another campaign, the "Three Revolutions Red Flag Movement" (삼대혁명붉은기쟁취운동), began in 1975. It encouraged public competition to meet national goals. North Korean authorities claimed these campaigns contributed to the early fulfillment of the Six-Year National Economic Plan (1971–1976).

== First plenary session ==
The Central Committee ranking list was as follows:

- Kim Il Sung
- Choe Yong-gon
- Kim Il
- Pak Song-chol
- Choe Hyon
- Kim Yong-ju
- O Chin-u
- Kim Tong-gyu
- So Chol
- Kim Chung-nin
- Han Ik-su
- Hyon Mu-gwang
- Chong Chun-taek
- Yang Hyong-sop
- Kim Man-gum
- Nam Il
- Choe Yong-jin
- Hong Won-gil
- Chong Kyong-hui
- Kim Yo-jung

== Plenums of the 5th Central Committee ==
- 1st Plenary Session (13 November 1970)
- 2nd Enlarged Plenary Session (19–23 April 1971)
- 3rd Plenary Session (15–22 November 1971)
- 4th Plenary Session (1–6 July 1972)
- 5th Plenary Session (23–26 October 1972)
- 6th Plenary Session (22 December 1972)
- 7th Plenary Session (4–17 September 1973)
- 8th Plenary Session (11–13 February 1974)
- 9th Plenary Session (1974)
- 10th Plenary Session (11–17 February 1975)
- 11th Plenary Session (19–21 November 1975)
- 12th Plenary Session (11–14 October 1976)
- 13th Plenary Session (4–6 April 1977)
- 14th Plenary Session (5–7 September 1977)
- 15th Plenary Session (13 December 1977)
- 16th Plenary Session (28 January 1978)
- 17th Plenary Session (27 November 1978)
- 18th Plenary Session (13–15 June 1979)
- 19th Plenary Session (10–12 December 1979)
