= Kim Ik-son =

North Korean politician (born 1918)

- 김익선

Chairman of the Central Court
- In office 9 September 1948 – 2 March 1955

Personal details
- Born: 1918
- Died: after 1971
- Occupation: Politician, judge

Kim Ik-son (Korean: 김익선; 1918 – after 1971) was a North Korean politician who served in various party and government positions including as the first chairman of the Central Court of North Korea.

== Life and career ==
After liberation of Korea, he started as the Chairman of the Myongchon Party Committee, worked as Vice Chairman of the County Party Committee, and graduated from the Central Party School of the Soviet Union in October 1945. After returning to Korea, he served as the deputy director of the 1st Central Committee of the Workers' Party of North Korea. In 1947, he was appointed head of the Propaganda Department of the Cultural Bureau of the Ministry of Internal Affairs, and in March 1948, he was elected director of the Pyongnam Tribunal. In July 1948, he became a member of the censorship department of the 2nd Central Committee of the Workers' Party of Korea. In September 1948, when the first cabinet was formed following the country's formal independence, he was appointed as the first Chief Justice of North Korea. In February 1951, he served as a member of the funeral committee of Kim Chaek, and in August 1951, he served as a member of the funeral committee of Ho Hon. In April 1956, he was elected member of the Central Committee and chairman of the censorship committee at the 3rd Party Congress. In September 1957, he was elected as a deputy to the Supreme People's Assembly for the second term and chairman of the Legislative Committee of the Supreme People's Assembly. Between 1957 and 1958, he was elected as a candidate member of the 3rd Standing Committee. On November 24, 1960, by decision of the Supreme People's Assembly, he was again elected to the Supreme Court. In September 1961, as the Standing Committee was merged to the 4th Political Committee at the 4th Party Congress, he was re-elected as a candidate member of the Political Committee. In October 1962, he was re-elected to the third term as deputy to the Supreme People's Assembly and appointed Chairman of the Legislative Assembly, and President of the Supreme Court. In September 1962, he served as a member of the funeral committee of Kim Kyong-sok, in May 1963, as a member of the funeral committee of Kang Chin-gon, in May 1965, as a member of the funeral committee Han Tong-baek, and in July 1965, as a member of the funeral committee Jong Ro-sik. In December 1967, he was re-elected as a deputy to the 4th convocation of the Supreme People's Assembly and served as Minister of State Control in the 4th Cabinet. From 29 April 1956 to 12 November 1970 he concurrently served as Chairman of the Control Commission of the Workers' Party of Korea. In August 1969 he was a member of the funeral committee of Ri Chu-yon. In November 1970, he was included in the executive committee of the 5th Party Congress, but was eliminated from the 5th Central Committee, and in December 1972, didn't participate in the election to the 5th convocation of the Supreme People's Assembly and disappeared from public appearances, apparently due to his involvement in the Kapsan faction incident.

== Bibliography ==
- Suh, Dae-sook (1981). Korean Communism 1945–1980: A Reference Guide to the Political System (1st ed.). University Press of Hawaii. ISBN 0-8248-0740-5.
