= Kim Chon-hae =

Zainichi Korean politician (1898–1969)

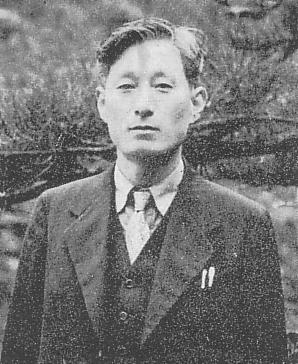

Korean name
- Hangul: 김천해
- Hanja: 金天海
- RR: Gim Cheonhae
- MR: Kim Ch'ŏnhae

Art name
- Hangul: 김학의
- Hanja: 金鶴儀
- RR: Gim Hakui
- MR: Kim Hagŭi
- Japanese name: Kin Tenkai (金天海)

Kim Chon-hae (Korean: 김천해; Hanja: 金天海, Japanese reading: Kin Tenkai; 10 May 1898 – c. 1969) was a Zainichi Korean who was a leading figure in the Japanese Communist Party and a founder of the pro-communist Chōren, predecessor of the modern Chongryon. He was subsequently a politician in North Korea, holding posts connected to the Workers' Party of Korea.

== History ==
Born in 1898 at Ulsan, in 1920 he moved to Japan and studied mathematics at Nihon University in Tokyo. While there, he organized a Korean workers' movement and was elected chairman of the Federal Union of Zainichi Koreans. Detained as a political prisoner, he was released on 10 October 1945 after Japan's defeat in the Second World War, and became a member of the executive committee of the JCP.

Although Chōren was founded as a non-political organization, his appointment as supreme adviser ensured its drift toward the left. Under Kim's influence, the League purged its anti-communist members and in February 1946 it joined the Korean Democratic National Front. In 1951, Edward Wagner described Kim as "the man who probably is to be credited more than any other with shaping the League's political orientation and preserving its undeviating character".

He subsequently moved to North Korea in 1950 and became a member of the Central Committee of the Workers' Party of Korea, and from April 1956 he served as chairman of the Fatherland Front. He remained in the Front's presidium through the first half of the 1960s. North Korean official sources state that Kim died in 1969, but the actual date and circumstances of his death are unknown.
