= Yi Pyong-nam =

North Korean politician (1903–1977)

Minister of Public Health
- In office 9 September 1948 – 23 October 1959
- Premier: Kim Il Sung
- Preceded by: Post established
- Succeeded by: Choe Chang-sok

Personal details
- Born: December 9, 1903 Cheonan, Chūseinan-dō (South Chungcheong Province), Korea, Empire of Japan
- Died: February 18, 1972 (aged 68)
- Party: Workers' Party of Korea
- Education: Kyunggi High School; Keijō Imperial University

Yi Pyong-nam (Korean: 리병남／李炳南; December 9, 1903 – February 18, 1977) was a pediatrician during the Japanese colonial rule of Korea and later a politician and medical scientist in the Democratic People's Republic of Korea. He served as a delegate in the Supreme People's Assembly, North Korea's unicameral parliament and also as Minister of Public Health, in the Cabinet of North Korea as well as the Chairman of the Central Committee of the Korean Red Cross.

== Biography ==
Born in Cheonan, South Chungcheong Province in 1903. During the Japanese colonial rule, after graduating from Kyunggi High School, he graduated from the Faculty of Medicine at Keijō Imperial University, and was a professor there.

After liberation of Korea in 1945, he participated in the founding of the Korean Pediatric Science Society in September. In October of that year, with the recommendation of Myung Joo-wan, he became a professor of pediatrics at Seoul National University College of Medicine which lacked professors. He served as vice-chairman of the Seoul Metropolitan Medical Association, and chairman of the Health Policy Committee of the Namjosun Health Federation, but was arrested twice for joining a leftist group. From January 1946, when the movement against trusteeship became a social controversy, university professors decided not to intervene in political affairs, led by Yoon Il-sun at the time, but Lee Byung-nam became a civilian health expert on the left wing.

While serving as a professor of pediatrics at Seoul National University College of Medicine, he was dismissed for participating in the leftist struggle in 1947, and was reopened in Jongno. In 1948, they supported the north–south negotiations, and in April of that year, they visited Pyongyang to participate in the north–south negotiations, and then settled without encountering them.

In August of that year, he was elected as deputy to the Supreme People's Assembly, and on September 9, after the Democratic People's Republic of Korea was formally established, he was appointed as its first Minister of Public Health in the Cabinet of North Korea led by Premier Kim Il Sung. He temporarily retired in December of that year, and then became a Health Minister again in September 1949. In 1955, he became the Health Minister of North Korea again and was appointed chairman of the Central Committee of the Korean Red Cross that year. On September 20, 1957, he was appointed again to the Minister of Health, and once again on July 6, 1959. In 1960, he became vice-chairman of the Medical Science Academy of North Korea and served until his death.
