= Kim Chang-bong =

North Korean politician (born 1919)

Chief of the General Staff of the Korean People's Army
- In office August 1953 – September 1957
- Preceded by: Lee Kwon-mu
- Succeeded by: Choe Kwang

Minister of People's Armed Forces
- In office October 1962 – December 1968
- Preceded by: Kim Kwang-hyop
- Succeeded by: Choe Hyon

Personal details
- Born: 1919 (age 106–107) Kyongwon County, Korea, Empire of Japan
- Party: Workers' Party of Korea
- Education: Military Academy of the Soviet General Staff

Military service
- Allegiance: Korean People's Army
- Years of service: 1945–1950
- Commands: Chief of the general staff of the KPA
- Battles/wars: See battles Korean independence movement: Pacification of Manchukuo; Chinese Civil War World War II: Pacific War; Korean War: Battle of Uijeongbu; Battle of Pocheon; Battle of Pusan Perimeter

- Kim Chang-bong
- Hangul: 김창봉
- RR: Gim Changbong
- MR: Kim Ch'angbong

Kim Chang-bon (Korean: 김창봉, born 1919) was a politician and military officer of North Korea. He belonged to the Manchu faction, the mainstream of the Workers' Party of Korea led by Kim Il Sung. He was sometimes mentioned as Kim Chang Feng. Kim Chang-deok is also known as his brother. After the establishment of North Korea and the end of Korean War he held various high positions in the North Korean Political system.

== Biography ==
Kim was born in Kyongwon County, North Hamgyong Province, Korea, Empire of Japan in 1919. Worked as the 5th member of the 1st Army of the Tohoku Anti-Japanese United Army Performed partisan activities under the direction of Ankichi. Escape the Japanese army and enter the Soviet Union. Active as a member of the Soviet reconnaissance unit. After the end of the Second World War, he arrived in Yanji with Kang Jian, led by Park Luo-gwan and Choi Gwang with about 30 people. In 1946 he returned home with Ken Kang and others. That same year, he was the captain of the 38th parallel security battalion.

During the Korean War, he was the 7th Regiment of the 3rd Division (colonel). In October 1950 he was appointed as commander of the 19th Division. In December 1950, 12th Division commander. In April 1951, commander of the 8th Corps. In July 1953 following the end of Korean War and the signing of the armistice, he was promoted to major general and became the 7th Corps commander.

He studied at the USSR Academy of Military from mid-1956 to September 1958. In April 1956, he was elected as a candidate for the Politburo at the 3rd Congress of the Workers' Party of Korea. Since July 1959, he has been the Chief of General Staff of the Korean People's Army. He was elected as a member of the Politburo at the 4th Congress of the Workers' Party of Korea which took place in September 1961.

In October 1962, he became Minister of National Security. He was elected as a member of the Central Committee at the 2nd Conference of the Workers' Party of Korea on October 12, 1966. However, he was criticized in 1969 for "wasting the national treasury and purchasing only state-of-the-art weapons" and "ignoring the Labor Red Guard".

== Works ==
- Kim Chang-bong (1968). "Pledge to Marshal Kim Il Sung: On Thoroughly Implementing and Pushing Through Instruction of Comrade Kim Il Sung on Further Deepening and Developing Red Flag Company Movement and on Effecting a New Innovation in Strengthening Combat Preparedness, Combat Preparedness, Combat Capacity". Korea Today (Supplement) (146). OCLC 86098374.

Political offices
Preceded by Kim Kwang-hyop	Minister of the People's Armed Forces; October 1962- October 1968	Succeeded by Choe Hyon
Military offices
Preceded by Lee Kwon-mu	Chief of the General Staff of the Korean People's Army; July 1959-October 1962	Succeeded by Choe Kwang
