= Chin Pan-su =

North Korean politician (1911–?)

- 진반수

Member of the WPK Politburo

Personal details
- Born: 1911
- Occupation: Politician

Chin Pan-su(陳斑秀) (Korean: 진반수; 1911–?) was a North Korean politician who served as minister in the North Korean cabinet and member of the 2nd Politburo of the Workers' Party of Korea.

== Biography ==
In 1948, he became a member of the 2nd Politburo of the Central Committee of the Workers' Party of Korea. He was active in the organization department of the Central Committee. From April 1953 to 11 May 1956, he served as Minister of Foreign Trade, from 11 to 20 September 1957 as Ministry of Internal and External Commerce. and from 29 September 1958 to May 1959 as Minister of Commerce in the 2nd Cabinet of North Korea.
