= Han Sorya =

North Korean author

Vice Chairman of the Supreme People's Assembly Standing Committee
- In office 2 October 1958 – 22 October 1963 Serving with Yi Kuk-no, Ko Chun-taek and Paek Nam-un.
- Chairman: Choe Yong-gon

Minister of Education and Culture
- In office 11 May 1956 – 29 September 1958
- Premier: Kim Il Sung
- Preceded by: Kim Chang-man
- Succeeded by: Yi Il-gyong

Personal details
- Born: Han Pyŏngdo; 3 August 1900 Hamhung, Korean Empire
- Died: 6 April 1976 (aged 75) Pyongyang, North Korea
- Resting place: Patriotic Martyrs' Cemetery
- Citizenship: North Korean
- Education: Nippon University
- Occupation: novelist, short story writer, literary administrator, politician
- Awards: Order of the National Flag (second class, 1951), People's Prize (History, 1958), title of People's Artist (1958)

Korean name
- Hangul: 한병도
- Hanja: 韓秉道
- RR: Han Byeongdo
- MR: Han Pyŏngdo

Pen name
- Hangul: 한설야
- Hanja: 韓雪野
- RR: Han Seolya
- MR: Han Sŏrya

Han Sorya (Korean: 한설야, born Han Pyŏngdo; 3 August 1900 – 6 April 1976) was a Korean writer, literary administrator and politician who spent much of his career in North Korea. Regarded as one of the most important fiction writers in North Korean history, Han also served as head of the Korean Writers' Union and Ministry of Education.

During his career, Han survived a number of purges that were caused by factional strife within the Workers' Party of North Korea, to become a member of the Central Committee of the Workers' Party of Korea. Han, motivated by personal grievances against his rival writers, sometimes acted as the force behind the purges within the cultural establishment as well. Han himself was purged in 1962. In his works, Han offered some of the earliest known contributions to the cult of personality of Kim Il Sung. His influence is felt in North Korea even today, though his name has been forgotten from official histories. Han's best-known work, the anti-American novella Jackals, however, has been invoked in the 2000s.

== Early life ==
Han was born on 3 August 1900 in Hamhung, in the north of Korea, Empire of Japan. His father was a county magistrate. He graduated from middle school in 1919 and attended Nippon University in Tokyo from 1921 to 1924, studying sociology. He emigrated to Manchuria in 1925 but returned to Seoul in the south in 1927. In 1944, he returned to his native Hamhung. After the liberation of Korea, he settled in Pyongyang.

== Career ==
Han was one of the most prominent fiction writers in the history of North Korean literature. During his career, Han earned the official title of "the greatest writer of modern Korean literature", which he shared with Yi Kiyŏng, and was called a "living classic". Han's career was at its height from 1955 to 1957. Han, along with Kim Tu-bong, shaped North Korea's cultural policies.

=== In Japanese-occupied Asia ===
Before the division and independence of Korea from Japan, Han was an insignificant author. His subsequent fame would only be due to his association with the Korean Artist Proletarian Federation (KAPF), which he joined in Seoul in 1927. The organization had been founded in 1925 during his emigration in Manchuria, and after the liberation it would have been the only left-leaning Korean literary organization. For this reason, Kim Il Sung would promote writers like Han who had belonged to it and exaggerated their achievements.

During the early 1930s, Han did briefly associate himself with leftist ideas, but later, during the Pacific War, he became a pro-Japanese writer. He also joined pro-Japanese writers' organizations. After the war, he reinvented his image abruptly. Besides the Japanese, he also distanced himself from the Domestic faction of the Workers' Party, though some scholars like Wada Haruki explicitly include him in the faction. From this position, he played an important role in opposing the Soviet Koreans faction during the late 1950s.

=== Emigration ===
After the liberation of Korea, writers were faced with the task of establishing a national literature. Some, like Kim Namch'ŏn, sought to gather a wide range of both moderate and progressive writers to write "democratic national literature". A writers' association called the Headquarters for the Construction of Korean Literature (MR: Chosŏn Munhak Kŏnsŏl Ponbu) was founded in 1945 immediately after the liberation by Kim and others. Han, however, disagreed with this approach, accusing it of forgetting class questions. Since the 1930s, Han had already had bad personal relations with these writers originally hailing from the south of Korea. The struggle for dominance in the North Korean literary bureaucracy made them worse. In retaliation Han, together with other writers including Yi Kiyŏng, founded the Korean Proletarian Literature Alliance (MR: Chosŏn P'ŭrollet'aria Munhak Tongmaeng). For Han's purposes his fellow writer Yi Kiyŏng, though respected, was not particularly interested in political matters and thus posed no threat to Han's own aspirations. The two organizations became merged to form Korean Writers' Alliance (MR: Chosŏn munhakka tongmaeng) in late 1945. Disapproving of this, Han moved to the north of the country, and was one of the first writers to do so.

=== In North Korea ===
Soon after starting his career in North Korea, Han had become one of the earliest and most enthusiastic admirers of Kim Il Sung, with whom he had met in February 1946. Han acted in his writing as a "curator of the personality cult" of Kim Il Sung and was, in effect, the official hagiographer of Kim. Indeed, the cult's beginnings can be traced as far back as 1946 when Han coined the appellation "our Sun" to describe Kim. Han was also the first to employ the phrase "Sun of the Nation" in referring to Kim. Considered protégé of Kim, Han survived the purge of the Domestic faction. The August faction criticized Han for his close ties with Kim Il Sung.

Writers opposing Han, such as Yim Hwa, were purged because of their connections with South Korean communists. When the Domestic faction, including its leader Pak Hon-yong, were purged, Han attacked their associates in the literary circles from 1953 onwards. Later, between 1955 and 1957, Han attacked the Soviet Koreans faction, accusing them of "factional, splitting activity" and "not allow[ing] the party and the people to demonstrate their good feeling and love toward their leader". It is possible that Han influenced Kim Il Sung to wage his campaign against the Soviet Koreans' faction specifically on the literary front, culminating in Kim's famous "Juche speech" of 1955: On Eliminating Dogmatism and Formalism and Establishing Juche in Ideological Work. The speech credits Han for uncovering "serious ideological errors on the literary front" and can be considered an expression of public support for Han. In editions after Han's purge in 1962, his name is omitted or replaced with the expression "prominent proletarian writers".

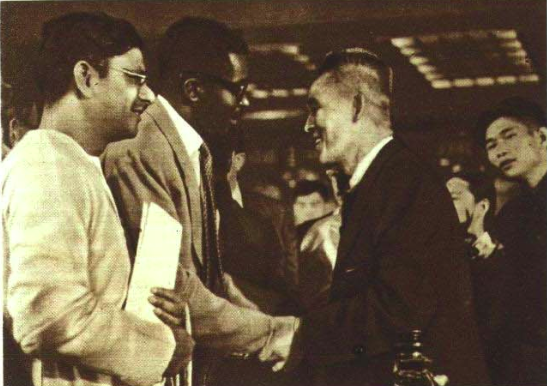
Han Sorya meeting Americans in 1952. Han's best-known work, Jackals, and his legacy is known for anti-Americanism.

During his career, Han held multiple posts in the literature administration as well as politics in general. Since 1946, Han edited North Korean Federation of Literature and Arts (NKFLA) organ Munhwa chonsŏn (Korean for 'The Cultural Front') and was the chairman of the organization since January 1948. During the Korean War, he was the chairman of the united Korean Federation of Literature and Arts (KFLA) and a member in its Literature Organization. Since 1953, Han was the chairman of the Korean Writers' Union. This position made him the most powerful cultural administrator of the country and he effectively ran the whole system of publishing literature and providing for the writers. Han also wrote for the Rodong Sinmun in the 1950s.

In 1946, Han became a member of the first Central Committee of the Workers' Party of North Korea. He maintained the post in the party and its successor, the Central Committee of the Workers' Party of Korea, until 1969. Han became the minister of education in May 1956 and retained his post as the chairman of the Writers' Union. During his ministerial career, Han initiated a campaign to diminish the importance of Russian language teaching in North Korean colleges in the spring of 1956. He also started to enlist writers with a proletarian background.

==== Purge ====
In 1962, Han was accused of "parochialism" and "bourgeois decadence" by the NKFLA. He was consequentially expelled from the party and stripped of his offices. His purge coincided with the election of the third Supreme People's Assembly. The following year, he was exiled to a village in Chagang Province. Han was likely pardoned later, in 1969, when his name reappeared as a member of the party Central Committee. Han was never reassigned to any other post he had held. He was absent from the 5th Congress of the Workers' Party of Korea in November 1970, leading B. R. Myers to conclude that it is likely "though by no means certain, that Han died sometime between late 1969 and late 1970", with some preference for the year 1970. Han's gravestone at the Patriotic Martyrs' Cemetery in Pyongyang, however, gives the date of his death as 6 April 1976. Ultimately, the secrecy practiced by North Korea precludes any certain knowledge about "when (or even if) Han died".

In Han's wake, other cultural figures, like Ch'oe Sŭnghŭi and Sim Yŏng, were purged also. The regime faced a problem in Han's work being politically useful in nature, but his name tarnished. His name began to be disconnected from his work, which was still widely disseminated. For the future, North Korean publishing authorities would employ a policy of publishing collective works of creative teams and withhold names of individual authors, a practice that was observed particularly in the 1970s and started to wane only in the 1980s.

== Legacy ==
Though Han Sorya's name has been since been all but forgotten in official North Korean accounts, his influence on contemporary North Korean literature has been significant.

Literately, Han's style of writing has been described as experimental in his employment of various narrative structures. Andrei Lankov considers Han mediocre as a writer and assess his rivals Kim Namch'ŏn and Yi T'ae-jun "marginally more gifted", however considering North Korean literature of the period "boring and highly politicized propaganda" across the board. Lankov describes Han "unscrupulous" as an opportunist and careerist. The literary style and ideologies of Han and some of his adversaries are very similar, and Han's prevailing is due to factional strife. Some aspects of the struggles are baseless, too, as some works by Han include rather sympathetic depictions of Japanese soldiers, while it was many of his rivals who were purged because of their "pro-Japanese" tendencies. Thus, Lankov concludes, the struggle within the literary establishment can be attributed to conflicting personal ambitions more than anything else.

Yearn Hong Choi assess that "Han is not a typical North Korean writer" but an extremely political one in his attempt at pleasing Kim Il Sung. B. R. Myers contrasts Han's legacy with that of North Korean poet Cho Ki-chon. While in Han's works Kim Il Sung embodies traditional Korean virtues of innocence and naivety having "mastered Marxism–Leninism with his heart, not his brain", in Cho's he exemplifies particular traits of the rather early cult of personality built upon Soviet Marxism–Leninism and bloc conformity. The style of Han based on Korean ethnic nationalism ultimately established itself as the standard of propaganda over Cho's. According to Myers, Han is not a writer of fiction in the official literary doctrine of socialist realism at all, but "his own man, not a socialist realist". Yearn Hong Choi disagrees, and points to Han's one-time praise of the Soviets and Kim Il Sung as well as his employment of propaganda in praise of a "utopian" North Korea as proof of him being a socialist realist. According to Yearn, Myers simply has a different idea of what socialist realism is from North Korean writers.

An exception to Han's forgotten legacy in North Korea exists. The multi-part film Nation and Destiny not only features him but allows Han to be a hero of the film. This was the first time that an anti-establishment figure has been the hero on North Korean screen. In South Korea, Han's works were banned by the Ministry of Culture and Information.

== Works ==
History (MR: Ryŏksa) was the first long North Korean work to deal with Kim Il Sung during the Anti-Japanese struggle. Yan'an faction member Yi P'il-gyu expressed harsh criticism of History, aimed at Han's close relationship with Kim Il Sung: "Han Sŏl-ya — he should be killed. He deserves it even only for just one book — History. He is a very bad and harmful man; he is Kim Il Sung's sycophant, a bootlicker".

=== Jackals ===
All in all, there were a lot of poor people living around here. The missionaries had purchased the area for twenty wŏn upon arriving in Korea twenty years ago. Since then they had turned it into a scenic summer retreat, on which Reverend Yi and one or two newly-rich families had recently erected neat brick houses. But far from benefiting from this, those who had always lived there in their rock huts just became more inextricably enmired in poverty as time went on.

— Jackals

Jackals, (Note: The Korean name of the novella is 승냥이 (Sŭngnyangi), which literally means 'dholes'. In English, the work is often known as Jackals following Myers' translation. Sometimes Wolves is used, whereas North Korean sources use Wolf.) is a 1951 novella by Han, noted for its anti-American and anti-Christian tendencies. Jackals tells the story of a Korean boy murdered by American missionaries with an injection. In North Korea, the story is taken to be based on fact, and B. R. Myers assesses that it is possible that it gave impetus to allegations of biological warfare in the Korean War by North Korea. Called "the country's most enduring work of fiction", it is still influential in North Korea where the word "jackals" has become a synonym for "Americans", and papers like Rodong Sinmun regularly invoke the language of the novella.

The emotional story is inspired by Maxim Gorky's sentimental novel Mother, which is considered the first socialist realist novel, and a story that Han was familiar with. Myers traces the story's foundation back to anti-Christian stories in rural colonial Korea as well as in fascist Japan. The metaphor of the villain as a beast, too, is more readily associated with wartime Japanese propaganda than socialist realism. It had, however, featured in the works of early Soviet writers as whose work Han knew, as well as in textual genres not bound by the official socialist realist dogma, such as journalism.

Jackals was republished in Chosŏn munhak, Ch'ŏngnyŏn munhak and Chollima in August 2003, one year after the Bush administration designated North Korea as part of the "axis of evil". After the Sony Pictures Entertainment hack of 2014, North Korean media employed similar rhetoric against Secretary of State John Kerry. One article compared Kerry with a jackal no fewer than eleven times. Jackals was adapted on stage and performed in Pyongyang in 2015. The novel remains one of the very few North Korean works of fiction that have been translated into English.

=== List of works ===
- Han Sorya (1929). Kwadogi [Transition Period]. Short story.
- — (1929). Ssirŭm [Wrestling Match]. Short story.
- — (1932). Sabang Kongsa [Erosion Work].
- — (1936). Hwanghon [Dusk]. Novel.
- — (1940). T'ap [Pagoda]. Autobiographical novel.
- — (1950). Ch'oso-esŏ [At a Guard Post].
- — (1946). Hyŏlla [Path of Blood].
- — (1946). Mining Settlement.
- — (1946). Moja [The Hat].
- — (1949). Growing Village.
- — (1949). Brother and Sister.
- — (1994) [1951]. "Jackals". In Brian Myers (ed.). Han Sŏrya and North Korean Literature: The Failure of Socialist Realism in DPRK. Ithaca: East Asia Program, Cornell University. pp. 157–188. ISBN 978-0-939657-84-1.
- — (1955). Taedonggang [The Taedong River]. Trilogy.
- — (1955). Man'gyŏngdae.
- — (1958). Ryŏksa [History]. People's Prize (1958).
- — (1960). Love.
- — (1960). Emulate the Leader.

== See also ==
- Cho Ki-chon
- Korean literature
- North Korean literature
