= Hyon Mu-gwang =

North Korean politician (1913–1992)

- 현무광
- President: Kim Il Sung

Personal details
- Born: 1913 Kankyōhoku Province, Korea, Empire of Japan
- Died: March 1992 (aged 78–79) Pyongyang, North Korea
- Party: Workers' Party of Korea

Hyon Mu-gwang (Korean: 현무광, 1913 – March 1992) was a North Korean politician, vice premier of the State Administration of Government, member of the Central People's Committee of North Korea and chairman of the National Audit Committee.

== Biography ==
Hyon Mu-gwang was born in Hongyuan County, south-central South Hamgyong Province. In his early years, he worked as a worker in a factory in Seoul. During the Japanese occupation, he was forced to requisition to work in a steel plant in Chongjin City. In 1937, he joined the National Liberation League and engaged in the communist movement. He was subsequently arrested by the Japanese colonial government and sentenced to prison. In 1945, Japan surrendered and World War II ended, and Hyon became chairman of the Party Committee of the WPK Steel Plant. In 1948, he was appointed director of the Pyongyang Pistol Factory. During the Korean War, he was appointed as the director of several arsenals, specializing in the production of rifles, mortars, anti-tank weapons and other armaments. After the war, he was appointed to study political theory and party history at a high-level Soviet party school.

In 1956, Hyon returned, and immediately became the vice chairman of Xianjing South Road. In the same year, he was elected as acting member of the Supreme People's Assembly. He was re-elected to this position 7 times. In 1958, he was promoted to chairman of South Hamgyong Province. In 1960, he was appointed Minister of Heavy Industry of the Party Central Committee. In 1962, he was relocated to the chairman of North Hamgyong Province. The following year, he was promoted to the chairman of the Machinery Industry Committee (later the Minister of the Machinery Industry). In 1970, he was elected as a member of the Central People's Committee, an alternate member of the Political Committee and a secretary of the Secretariat. In 1972, he concurrently served as chairman of the Transportation and Communications Commission.

In 1984, Hyon was promoted to Vice Premier of North Korea. Two years later, he was appointed chairman of the National Audit Committee. In recognition of his contribution to rebuilding North Korea's heavy industry and developing military industry, the Pyongyang government awarded him the Order of Kim Il Sung and the title of "Hero of the Republic". He has also visited the Soviet Union, China and East Germany many times on behalf of North Korea. He died in Pyongyang in March 1992. The Pyongyang government held a state funeral for him and was buried in Revolutionary Martyrs' Cemetery.
