= Pak Yong-sin =

North Korean politician (fl. 20th century)

Pak Yong-sin was a North Korean politician (Communist).

She served as Minister of Culture from 1966 to 1972.
