= Choe Yong-jin =

North Korean politician

- 최용진

WPK Central Committee member
- Supreme Leader: Kim Il-ung; Kim Jong-il

Personal details
- Born: 1911 North Hamgyong, North Korea
- Died: 1998 (aged 86–87)
- Citizenship: North Korean
- Party: Workers' Party of Korea
- Education: Pyongyang Second Middle School

Military service
- Allegiance: North Korea

Choe Yong-jin (Korean: 최용진 (1911-1998) was a North Korean politician and general. He belonged to the Manchu faction. He served as Vice Premier of North Korea

== Biography ==
Born in North Hamgyong Province in 1911. 1928 Graduated from Pyongyang Second Middle School. He joined the anti-Japanese partisans in Manchuria. In November 1936, he became commander of the 1st Division, 1st Division, 7th Army of the Northeast Anti-Japanese United Army. In 1939, he became the commander of the 2nd Route Army 2nd Detachment Guidance Battalion. In April 1940, he became commander of the 3rd Battalion, 2nd Detachment, 2nd Route Army and in 1941, commander of the 2nd Route Army 2nd Detachment 1st Battalion Commander. In February 1944, he escaped from the Japanese army and entered the territory of the Soviet Union.

On September 19, 1945, members of the 88th Brigade boarded the Soviet cargo ship ‘Pugachev’ and entered the port of Wonsan with Choe among them. Immediately after returning home, Kim Il-sung instructed the members, After the war, he returned to Japan and participated in the creation of the North Korean army. In July 1946, he became Vice Military Principal of the Central Security Command School. In December 1946, he became commander (colonel) of the 5th Regiment, 2nd Division. In September 1948 he commanded the 2nd Regiment of the 1st Division. In December of the same year, he became the principal of the First Central Military Academy. In March 1950 he was appointed the commander of the 13th Division.

When the Korean War broke out, he participated in the invasion of the South. He is also said to have been shot and wounded during an argument with the chief of staff of the division, Colonel Lee Hak-gu, during the First Battle of Naktong Bulge. October 1950 he was appointed as 6th Corps Commander. In May 1952, he became Commander of the 5th Corps, and from October 1955, Commander of the 2nd Corps. In April 1956 he was nominated as a candidate (non-voting) member for the WPK Central Committee during the 3rd Party Congress. In June 1958, he became commander of the 2nd Group Army. That same year, he became commander of the North Korean Air Force. In 1960 he was appointed Deputy Minister of State Security. In September 1961, at the 4th Congress of the Workers’ Party of Korea he was elected a member of the Central Committee. In 1962 he became Minister of Fisheries and in February 1964, head of the Railway Transportation Commission. In July of the same year he was appointed a deputy prime minister of North Korea. In November 1970, at the 5th Congress of the WPK he was elected member of the Central Committee. In 1980, at the 6th Congress, he was re-elected to the WPK Central Committee.

== Bibliography ==
- Suh, Dae-sook (1981). Korean Communism 1945–1980: A Reference Guide to the Political System (1st ed.). University Press of Hawaii. ISBN 0-8248-0740-5.
