= Kim Kwang-hyop =

North Korean politician (1915–1970)

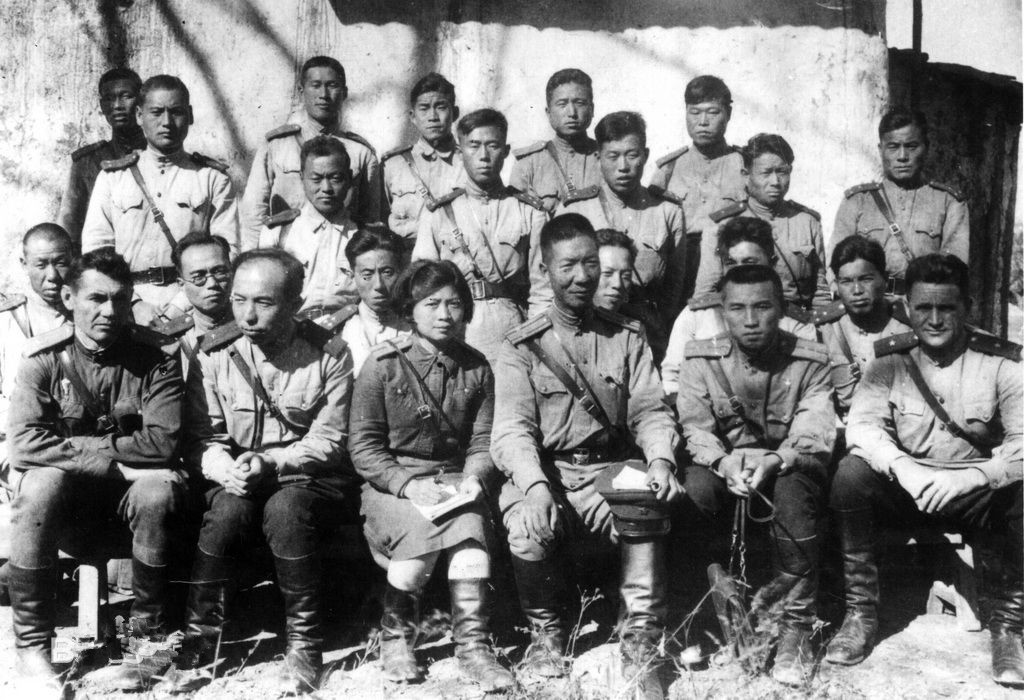
- Kim Kwang-hyop (second row from top, second person from right) with the 88th Separate Rifle Brigade in 1943

Chief of the General Staff of the Korean People's Army
- In office August 1953 – September 1957

Minister of People's Armed Forces
- In office September 1957 – 1962

Personal details
- Born: 1915 Hoeryong, Korea, Empire of Japan
- Died: 1970 (aged 54–55)
- Party: Workers' Party of Korea

Military service
- Battles/wars: See battles Korean independence movement: Pacification of Manchukuo; Chinese Civil War World War II: Pacific War; Korean War: Battle of Chuncheon; Battle of Gangneung; Battle of Uljin-Pyeonghae; Battle of Mugeuk-ri; Battle of Dongnak-ri; Battle of Jincheon; Battle of Danyang; Battle of Yeongdeok-Ganggu; Battle of Pusan Perimeter; Battle of Cheonpyeong Valley

Korean name
- Hangul: 김광협
- Hanja: 金光俠
- RR: Gim Gwanghyeop
- MR: Kim Kwanghyŏp

Kim Kwang-hyop (Korean: 김광협, 1915–1970) was a North Korean anti-Japanese activist, military officer and politician. He served as Chief of the General Staff of the Korean People's Army.

== Biography ==
He was born in Hoeryong, North Hamgyong Province, in 1915. In 1930, at the age of 16, he moved to China and graduated from Huangpu Military Academy, where he worked as an anti-Japanese partisan. In 1935, he joined the Chinese Communist Party, and in 1940 he served as the second member of the Northeast Anti-Japanese United Army's Second Army. After the fall of the Empire of Japan, he became the commander of the military district of the Northeast Democratic Army of the pro-Soviet Provisional People's Committee of North Korea.

At the onset of the Korean War he was the commander of the Second Army of the Korean People's Army. After the armistice of the Korean War, he was promoted to the Chief of the General Staff of the Korean People's Army. He served as a delegate to the Supreme People's Assembly in following the 1957 North Korean parliamentary election and from September that year until October 1962 he was also Minister of People's Armed Forces.

Political offices
Preceded by Choe Yong-gon	Minister of the People's Armed Forces; September 1957- October 1962	Succeeded by Kim Chang-bong
Military offices
Preceded by Nam Il	Chief of the General Staff of the Korean People's Army; August 1953-September 1957	Succeeded by Lee Kwon-mu
