= Jong Jun-thaek =

North Korean politician (1911–1973)

- 정준택
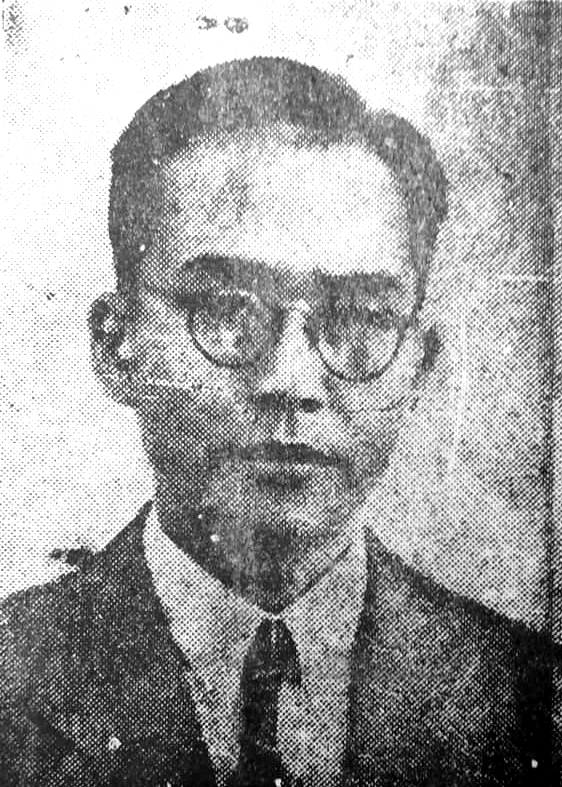
- Jong in 1948

Vice Premier of North Korea
- Chairman: Kim Il Sung

Personal details
- Born: 1911
- Died: January 11, 1973 (aged 61–62)
- Resting place: Revolutionary Martyrs' Cemetery
- Citizenship: North Korean
- Party: Workers' Party of Korea
- Children: Jong Kyong-thaek
- Education: Gyeongseong Advanced Industrial School
- Occupation: Politician

Jong Jun-thaek (Korean: 정준택, 1911 – January 11, 1973) was a North Korean politician and public official who served as Vice Premier of North Korea and member of the Supreme People's Assembly, North Korea's unicameral parliament.

== Biography ==
Following his studies, he worked as a mine manager. Jong joined the Workers' Party of Korea in 1946, and in 1947 was appointed as the director of the North Korean People's Committee and the representative of the Korean People's Assembly (the predecessor of the Supreme People's Assembly) in South Hamgyong Province.

He served as the first Chairman of the National Planning Commission of North Korea in 1948 and the Vice Prime Minister.

In 1957, he was re-elected as deputy member of the Supreme People's Assembly. In 1958, he was awarded the first class Order of the National Flag. In 1962, he once again became a representative of the Supreme People's Assembly. He was elected Chairman State Planning Commission in the North Korean Cabinet in September 1948, the 5th Deputy Prime Minister of the Cabinet on September 20, 1957, the 6th Deputy Prime Minister in October 1958, and the 7th Deputy Prime Minister on October 23, 1962. He was re-elected to the National Planning Commission in October 1962.

JongvJun-thaek had an economics university named after him (Chong Jun Taek Kyongje Daehak) in Kangwon in 1960 and in Wonsan. He traveled to Syria and Sudan in 1972 on diplomatic missions, meeting President Assad.

He died of a heart attack on January 11, 1973, in Pyongyang. and was buried in the Revolutionary Martyrs' Cemetery. He was posthumously awarded Hero of the Republic title. His son is also high-ranking politician, Jong Kyong-thaek
