= 6th Central Committee of the Workers' Party of Korea =

Workers' Party of Korea

6th Central Committee
- Emblem of the Workers' Party of North Korea

14 October 1980 – 9 May 2016 (35 years, 208 days) Overview
- Type: Central Committee of the Workers' Party of Korea
- Election: 6th Congress
- Replenishment: 3rd Conference

Leadership
- General Secretary: Kim Jong Il; Kim Il Sung
- First Secretary: Kim Jong Un
- Presidium: 5 (1980)
- Politburo: 19 full (1980); 4 alt. (1980)
- Secretariat: 10 (1980)
- Control organ: 7 (1980)

Members
- Total: 145 (1980); 124 (2010)

Alternates
- Total: 103 (1980); 104 (2010)

The 6th Central Committee of the Workers' Party of Korea was elected by the 6th Congress on 14 October 1980, and remained in session until the election of the 7th Central Committee on 9 May 2016. The Central Committee composition was replenished by the 3rd WPK Conference. In between party congresses and specially convened conferences the Central Committee is the highest decision-making institution in the WPK and North Korea. The Central Committee is not a permanent institution and delegates day-to-day work to elected bodies, such as the Presidium, the Politburo, the Secretariat, the Central Military Commission and the Control Commission in the case of the 6th Central Committee. It convenes meetings, known as "Plenary Session of the [term] Central Committee", to discuss major policies. Only full members have the right to vote, but if a full member cannot attend a plenary session, the person's spot is taken over by an alternate. Plenary session can also be attended by non-members, such meetings are known as "Enlarged Plenary Session", to participate in the committee's discussions.

The 6th Central Committee convened for plenums regularly until 1993, but failed to convene a plenum for 17 years after Kim Il Sung's death in 1994. References to it being the sixth term of the Central Committee were dropped by the WPK at the 3rd Conference despite the fact that the party rules does not empower it to start a new term - it is only empowered to replace its Central Committee members.

In September 1992 it had 160 members and 143 alternate members.

The Central Committee elected by the 3rd Party Conference was made up of 124 members and 106 alternates.

== Plenary meetings ==
Plenum	Start–end	Length
1st Plenary Session	14 October 1980	1 day
2nd Plenary Session	19–20 December 1980	2 days
3rd Plenary Session	1–2 April 1981	2 days
4th Plenary Session	4–6 October 1981	3 days
5th Plenary Session	3 April 1982	1 day
6th Plenary Session	29–31 August 1982	3 days
7th Plenary Session	15–17 June 1983	3 days
8th Plenary Session	29 November – 1 December 1983	3 days
9th Plenary Session	6–9 July 1984	4 days
10th Plenary Session	4–10 December 1984	7 days
11th Plenary Session	5–8 February 1986	4 days
12th Plenary Session	27 December 1986	1 day
13th Plenary Session	7–11 March 1987	5 days
14th Plenary Session	28–30 November 1987	3 days
15th Plenary Session	12 December 1988	1 day
16th Plenary Session	7–9 June 1989	3 days
17th Plenary Session	5–9 January 1990	5 days
18th Plenary Session	23 May 1990	1 day
19th Plenary Session	24 December 1991	1 day
20th Plenary Session	12 December 1992	1 day
21st Plenary Session	8 December 1993	1 day
September 2010 Plenum	28 September 2010	1 day
March 2013 Plenum	31 March 2013	1 day

== Apparatus ==
Institution
Administrative Department
Agricultural Department
Cadre Affairs Department
Chemical Industry Department
Discipline Investigation Department
Civil Defense Department
Construction and Transport Department
Culture and Arts Department
Economic Planning Department
External Liaison Department
Finance and Accounting Department
Financial Administration Department Department
Kim Il Sung Higher Party School
Light Industry Department
General Affairs Department
Health Department
Heavy Industry Department
International Department
Investigations Department
Liaison Department
Light Industry Department
Machine Industry Department
Mangyondae Revolutionary Institute
Mangyondae Revolutionary Museum
Military Affairs Department
Party Historical Research Centre
Operations Department
Organization and Guidance Department
Propaganda and Agitation Department
Science and Education Department
Social Culture Department
Three Revolutions Team Department
Youth Affairs Department
Working Organization Department

== Composition ==
=== Members elected at the 6th Congress ===
Rank	Name	Korean	5th CC (Note: Status in the 5th Central Committee as of the 5th Congress: Member means a person was elected as a member of the 5th Central Committee at the 5th Congress.; Alternate means a person was elected as an alternate member of the 5th Central Committee at the 5th Congress.; No means a person was not elected to the 5th Central Committee at the 5th Congress.)	2010 (Note: Status in the 6th Central Committee as of the 3rd Conference in 2010: Member means a person was elected as a member of the 6th Central Committee at the 3rd Conference.; Alternate means a person was elected as an alternate member of the 8th Central Committee at the 3rd Conference.; No means a person was not elected to the 6th Central Committee at the 3rd Conference.)	7th CC (Note: Status in the 7th Central Committee as of the 7th Congress: Member means a person was elected as a member of the 7th Central Committee at the 7th Congress.; Alternate means a person was elected as an alternate member of the 7th Central Committee at the 7th Congress.; No means a person was not elected to the 7th Central Committee at the 7th Congress.)
1	Kim Il Sung	김일성	Member	No	No
2	Kim Il	김일	Member	No	No
3	O Jin-u	오진우	Member	No	No
4	Kim Jong Il	김정일	No	Member	No
5	Ri Jong-ok	리종옥	No	No	No
6	Pak Song-chol	박성철	Member	No	No
7	Choe Hyon	최현	Member	No	No
8	Rim Chun-chu	림춘추	Member	No	No
9	So Chol	서철	Member	No	No
10	O Paek-ryong	오백룡	Member	No	No
11	Kim Jung-rin	김중린	Member	No	No
12	Kim Yong-nam	김영남	Member	Member	Member
13	Jon Mun-sop	전문섭	Member	No	No
14	Kim Hwan	김환	No	No	No
15	O Kuk-ryol	오극렬	Member	Member	Member
16	Kye Ung-thae	계응태	Member	No	No
17	Kang Song-san	강성산	Member	No	No
18	Ho Tam	허담	Member	No	No
19	Yun Ki-bok	윤기복	Member	No	No
20	Yon Hyong-muk	연형묵	Member	No	No
21	Choe Kwang	최광	No	No	No
22	Jo Se-ung	조세웅	No	No	No
23	Choe Jae-u	최재우	Member	No	No
24	Kong Jin-thae	공진태	No	No	No
25	Jong Jun-gi	정준기	Member	No	No
26	Kim Chol-man	김철만	Member	Member	Member
27	Jong Kyong-hui	정경희	Member	No	No
28	Choe Yong-rim	최영림	Member	Member	Member
29	So Yun-sok	서윤석	Alternate	No	No
30	Ri Kun-mo	리근모	Member	No	No
31	Hyon Mu-gwang	현무광	Member	No	No
32	Paek Hak-rim	백학림	Member	No	No
33	Kim Kang-hwan	김강환	No	No	No
34	Ri Son-sil	리선실	No	No	No
35	Hong Si-hak	홍시학	Member	No	No
36	Pak Su-dong	박수동	Member	No	No
37	Hwang Jang-yop	황장엽	Member	No	No
38	So Kwan-hi	서관히	No	No	No
39	Kim Tu-yong	김두영	No	No	No
40	Kim Kyong-ryon	김경련	Member	No	No
41	Jong Tong-chol	정동철	Member	No	No
42	Kim Kuk-thae	김국태	Member	Member	No
43	Thae Pyong-ryol	태병렬	Member	No	No
44	Pyon Chang-bok	변창복	No	No	No
45	Ro Myong-gun	로명근	No	No	No
46	Rim Ho-gun	림호군	No	No	No
47	Kim Pyong-ha	김병하	Member	No	No
48	Ri Jin-su	리진수	No	No	No
49	Kim Ki-nam	김기남	No	Member	Member
50	Kim Kwan-sop	김관섭	Alternate	No	No
51	Yang Hyong-sop	양형섭	Member	Member	Member
52	Ri Jong-ryong	리정룡	No	No	No
53	Jon Chang-chol	전창철	Member	No	No
54	Ho Jong-suk	허정숙	No	No	No
55	Ri Chang-son	리창선	No	No	No
56	Rim Hyong-gu	림형구	Alternate	No	No
57	Jang Kuk-chan	장국찬	No	No	No
58	Jo Chang-dok	조창덕	No	No	No
59	Kim Yun-hyok	김윤혁	No	No	No
60	Ri Ji-chan	리지찬	Member	No	No
61	Yun Ho-sok	윤호석	No	No	No
62	Ryom Jae-man	렴재만	No	No	No
63	Rim Kye-chol	림계철	No	No	No
64	Ko Jong-sik	고정식	No	No	No
65	Kim Il-dae	김일대	No	No	No
66	Kim Yong-chae	김영채	No	No	No
67	Choe Jong-gun	최정근	No	No	No
68	Pang Hak-se	방학세	Member	No	No
69	Ri Jae-yun	리재윤	No	No	No
70	Kim Pyong-ryul	김병률	Member	Member	No
71	Paek Pom-su	백범수	Alternate	No	No
72	Choe Mun-son	최문선	No	No	No
73	Ri Tong-chun	리동춘	Member	No	No
74	Kim Ki-son	김기선	Alternate	No	No
75	Kang Hui-won	강희원	Member	No	No
76	Ri Kil-song	리길송	Member	No	No
77	Rim Su-man	림수만	Member	No	No
78	Jang In-sok	장인석	No	No	No
79	Sim Chang-wan	심창완	Alternate	No	No
80	Pak Yong-sok	박용석	Member	No	No
81	Kim Chi-gu	김치구	No	No	No
82	Pak Yong-sun	박영순	Member	No	No
83	Hwang Sun-hui	황순희	Member	Alternate	Alternate
84	Ri Ul-sol	리을설	Member	Member	No
85	Jo Sun-baek	조순백	No	No	No
86	Ju To-il	주도일	Member	No	No
87	Ri Tu-ik	리두익	Member	No	No
88	Yang Ryong-kyok	양룡격	No	No	No
89	Jang Song-u	장성우	No	No	No
90	Jo Myong-rok	조명록	No	Member	No
91	Kim Il-chol	김일철	No	No	No
92	Choe Sang-uk	최상욱	No	No	No
93	Ri Jong-bae	리정배	No	No	No
94	Kim Ryong-un	김룡운	No	No	No
95	Jo Hui-won	조희원	No	No	No
96	Ri Ha-il	리하일	No	No	No
97	Ri Pong-won	리봉원	Alternate	No	No
98	Han Yong-ok	한영옥	No	No	No
99	Choe In-dok	최인덕	Member	No	No
100	O Jae-won	오재원	Member	No	No
101	Jon Mun-uk	전문욱	Member	No	No
102	Ri Tu-chan	리두찬	No	No	No
103	Kim Si-hak	김시학	Member	No	No
104	Jang Yun-phil	장윤필	Member	No	No
105	Kim Song-ae	김성애	Member	No	No
106	Chon Se-bong	천세봉	Alternate	No	No
107	Ri Man-sang	리만상	No	No	No
108	Jo Myong-son	조명선	Alternate	No	No
109	Jon Pyong-ho	전병호	Alternate	Member	No
110	Ri Pong-gil	리봉길	Member	No	No
111	Mun Song-sul	문성술	No	No	No
112	Ri Won-bom	리원범	No	No	No
113	Ri Chan-son	리찬선	No	No	No
114	Hyon Jun-guk	현준극	No	No	No
115	Kim Yong-sun	김용순	No	No	No
116	Hong Song-ryong	홍성룡	No	No	No
117	Kim Hoe-il	김회일	Member	No	No
118	Choe Jin-song	최진성	Alternate	No	No
119	Kim Jwa-hyok	김좌혁	Member	No	No
120	Yu Jong-suk	유정숙	Member	No	No
121	Ri Tong-ho	리동호	No	No	No
122	Kim Kuk-hun	김국훈	Member	No	No
123	Ri Kyong-son	리경선	No	No	No
124	Kim Tu-nam	김두남	No	No	No
125	Jon Hui-jong	전희정	No	Member	No
126	Ri Hwa-yong	리화영	No	No	No
127	Kim Yun-sang	김윤상	No	No	No
128	Won Tong-gu	원동구	No	No	No
129	Kim Man-gum	김만금	Member	No	No
130	Kang Hyon-su	강현수	Member	No	No
131	Ri Yong-ik	리용익	Member	No	No
132	Ryom Thae-jun	렴태준	Member	No	No
133	An Sung-hak	안승학	Member	No	No
134	Hong Ki-mun	홍기문	No	No	No
135	Hong Song-nam	홍성남	No	No	No
136	Choe Yong-jin	최용진	Member	No	No
137	Ri Jong-mok	리종목	No	No	No
138	Son Kyong-jun	손경준	Alternate	No	No
139	Ju Kil-bon	주길본	No	No	No
140	Kim Hyok-chol	김혁철	Member	No	No
141	Pae Chol-u	배철우	No	No	No
142	Kim Chong-ryong	김청룡	Member	No	No
143	Jong Chol	정철	No	No	No
144	Sim Kyong-chol	심경철	Member	No	No
145	Jon Jae-bong	전재봉	Member	No	No

=== Alternate members elected at the 6th Congress ===
Rank	Name	Korean	5th CC	2010	7th CC
1	Kang Sok-sung	강석숭	No	No	No
2	Thae Jong-su	태종수	No	Member	Member
3	Pang Chol-gap	방철갑	No	No	No
4	Kim Ung-sang	김응상	Alternate	No	No
5	Jo Chol-jun	조철준	No	No	No
6	Tong Min-gwang	동민광	No	No	No
7	Ho Sun	허순	No	No	No
8	Ri Ryang-suk	리량숙	No	No	No
9	So Jae-hong	서재홍	No	No	No
10	Jong Song-nam	정송남	No	No	No
11	Choe Man-hyon	최만현	No	No	No
12	Kim Thae-guk	김태극	No	No	No
13	Chae Hui-jong	채희정	No	Member	No
14	Pak Myong-bin	박명빈	No	No	No
15	Yun Ki-jong	윤기정	No	No	No
16	Sin Sang-gyun	신상균	No	No	No
17	Kim Pong-ryul	김봉률	No	No	No
18	Pak Jung-guk	박중국	No	No	No
19	Kim Kwang-jin	김광진	No	No	No
20	Ri Pyong-uk	리병욱	No	No	No
21	Kim Yong-chun	김영춘	No	Member	Member
22	Kim Ri-chang	김리창	No	No	No
23	Jon Jin-su	전진수	No	Member	No
24	Han Chang-su	한창수	No	No	No
25	Ryo Chun-sok	려춘석	No	Member	No
26	Ri Jong-u	리종우	No	No	No
27	Pak Ki-so	박기서	Alternate	No	No
28	O Ryong-bang	오룡방	Alternate	No	No
29	Ri In-dok	리인덕	No	No	No
30	Yun Chi-ho	윤치호	No	No	No
31	Ok Pong-rin	옥봉린	No	No	No
32	Jong Won-gyo	정원교	No	No	No
33	Kim Yong-hyon	김용현	No	No	No
34	Kim Jae-mun	김재문	No	No	No
35	Won Myong-gyun	원명균	No	No	No
36	Kwon Song-rin	권성린	No	No	No
37	Kim Pong-ju	김봉주	No	No	No
38	Son Song-phil	손성필	Alternate	No	No
39	Ji Chang-ik	지창익	No	No	No
40	Kim Song-gol	김성걸	No	No	No
41	Kim Yu-sun	김유순	No	No	No
42	Kim Ju-yong	김주영	No	No	No
43	Pyon Sung-u	변승우	No	No	No
44	Yom Ki-sun	염기순	No	No	No
45	Ri Song-bok	리성복	No	No	No
46	Ri Hwa-son	리화선	No	No	No
47	Kil Jae-kyong	길재경	No	No	No
48	Ri Wan-gi	리완기	No	No	No
49	Ju Chang-bok	주창복	Alternate	No	No
50	Pang Chol-ho	방철호	No	No	No
51	Kim Jang-gwon	김장권	Member	No	No
52	Ri Chol-bong	리철봉	Alternate	No	No
53	Ri Hyong-bong	리형봉	No	No	No
54	Han Song-ryong	한성룡	No	No	No
55	Choe Sang-yol	최상열	No	No	No
56	Ju Kyu-chang	주규창	Alternate	Member	Alternate
57	Pak Si-hyong	박시형	No	No	No
58	Choe Ung-rok	최응록	No	No	No
59	Jang Chol	장철	Alternate	No	No
60	Kim Jae-bong	김재봉	No	No	No
61	Sin Jin-sun	신진순	Alternate	No	No
62	Choe Man-guk	최만국	No	No	No
63	Han Sang-gyu	한상규	No	No	No
64	Kwon Hui-kyong	권희경	No	No	No
65	Jon Myong-su	전명수	No	No	No
66	Sin In-ha	신인하	No	No	No
67	Kim Ryong-yon	김룡연	Alternate	No	No
68	Im Rok-jae	임록재	Alternate	No	No
69	Ho Chang-suk	허창숙	Alternate	No	No
70	Wang Ok-hwan	왕옥환	Alternate	No	No
71	Ri Su-wol	리수월	No	No	No
72	Kim Ung-sam	김응삼	No	No	No
73	Ri Ho-hyok	리호혁	No	No	No
74	Jon Ha-chol	전하철	Alternate	Member	No
75	Kim Rak-hui	김락희	No	Member	No
76	Ri Kwang-han	리광한	No	No	No
77	Hong In-bom	홍인범	No	Member	Member
78	Ri Hwan-sam	리환삼	No	No	No
79	Pak Pong-ju	박봉주	No	Alternate	Member
80	Sin Tong-hwan	신동환	No	No	No
81	Ko Hak-chon	고학천	No	No	No
82	Jon Jae-ha	전재하	No	No	No
83	Pak Im-thae	박임태	No	No	No
84	Ho Min-son	허민선	No	No	No
85	Ko Thae-un	고태은	No	No	No
86	Kye Hyong-sun	계형순	Alternate	No	No
87	Choe Myong-chol	최명철	No	No	Member
88	Kim Chang-ho	김창호	No	No	No
89	Song Pok-gi	송복기	Member	No	No
90	Choe Pyong-ho	최병호	No	No	No
91	Han Kyu-phal	한규팔	No	No	No
92	Yu Jae-hwa	유재화	No	No	No
93	Pak Su-bom	박수범	No	No	No
94	Yun Myong-gun	윤명근	No	No	No
95	O Hyon-ju	오현주	No	No	No
96	Ri Sun-gun	리순근	No	No	No
97	Choe Chang-hwan	최창환	Member	No	No
98	Ri Jong-do	리정도	No	No	No
99	Kwak Yong-ho	곽영호	No	No	No
100	Pak Yong-myon	박용면	No	No	No
101	Won Tal-sik	원달식	No	No	No
102	Paek Sol-hui	백설희	No	No	No
103	Pak Yong-chol	박영철	No	No	No

=== Members elected at the 3rd Conference ===
Rank	Name	Korean	5th CC	1980 (Note: Status in the 6th Central Committee as of the 6th Congress: Member means a person was elected as a member of the 6th Central Committee at the 6th Congress.; Alternate means a person was elected as an alternate member of the 6th Central Committee at the 6th Congress.; No means a person was not elected to the 6th Central Committee at the 6th Congress.)	7th CC
1	Kim Jong Il	김정일	No	Member	No
2	Kang Nung-su	강능수	No	No	No
3	Kang Tong-yun	강동윤	No	No	No
4	Kang Sok-ju	강석주	No	No	Member
5	Kang Phyo-yong	강표영	No	No	No
6	Kang Yang-mo	강양모	No	No	Member
7	Ko Pyong-hon	고병헌	No	No	No
8	Kim Kuk-thae	김국태	Member	Member	No
9	Kim Kyong-hui	김경희	No	No	No
10	Kim Kyong-ok	김경옥	No	No	Member
11	Kim Ki-nam	김기남	No	Member	Member
12	Kim Ki-ryong	김기룡	No	No	No
13	Kim Rak-hui	김락희	No	Alternate	No
14	Kim Myong-guk	김명국	No	No	No
15	Kim Pyong-ryul	김병률	Member	Member	No
16	Kim Pyong-ho	김병호	No	No	Alternate
17	Kim Song-dok	김성덕	No	No	Member
18	Kim Song-chol	김송철	No	No	Member
19	Kim Jong-gak	김정각	No	No	Member
20	Kim Jong-suk	김정숙	No	No	Member
21	Kim Jong Un	김정은	No	No	Member
22	Kim Jong-im	김정임	No	No	Member
23	Kim Chang-sop	김창섭	No	No	No
24	Kim Chol-man	김철만	Member	Member	Member
25	Kim Chun-sam	김춘삼	No	No	No
26	Kim Thae-bong	김태봉	No	No	No
27	Kim Phyong-hae	김평해	No	No	Member
28	Kim Hyong-ryong	김형룡	No	No	Member
29	Kim Hyong-sik	김형식	No	No	No
30	Kim Hi-thaek	김히택	No	No	Alternate
31	Kim Yang-gon	김양건	No	No	No
32	Kim Yong-nam	김영남	Member	Member	Member
33	Kim Yong-chun	김영춘	No	Alternate	Member
34	Kim Yong-il	김영일	No	No	No
35	Kim Yong-chol	김영철	No	No	Member
36	Kim Yong-jin	김용진	No	No	Member
37	Kim In-sik	김인식	No	No	No
38	Kim Won-hong	김원홍	No	No	Member
39	Kwak Pom-gi	곽범기	No	No	Member
40	Ryang Man-gil	량만길	No	No	No
41	Ryo Chun-sok	려춘석	No	Alternate	No
42	Ro Tu-chol	로두철	No	No	Member
43	Ro Pae-gwon	로배권	No	No	No
44	Ryu Yong-sop	류영섭	No	No	No
45	Ri Ryong-nam	리룡남	No	No	Member
46	Ri Man-gon	리만건	No	No	Member
47	Ri Myong-su	리명수	No	No	Member
48	Ri Mu-yong	리무영	No	No	Member
49	Ri Pyong-sam	리병삼	No	No	No
50	Ri Pyong-chol	리병철	No	No	Member
51	Ri Pong-dok	리봉덕	No	No	Member
52	Ri Pong-juk	리봉죽	No	No	No
53	Ri Thae-nam	리태남	No	No	No
54	Ri Hyong-gun	리형근	No	No	Alternate
55	Ri Hi-hon	리히헌	No	No	No
56	Ri Yong-gil	리영길	No	No	Member
57	Ri Yong-su	리영수	No	No	No
58	Ri Yong-ho	리영호	No	No	No
59	Ri Yong-mu	리용무	No	No	Member
60	Ri Yong-hwan	리용환	No	No	Member
61	Ri Yong-chol	리용철	No	No	No
62	Ri Ul-sol	리을설	Member	Member	No
63	Rim Kyong-man	림경만	No	No	Member
64	Mun Kyong-dok	문경덕	No	No	No
65	Pak Kwang-chol	박광철	No	No	No
66	Pak To-chun	박도춘	No	No	Member
67	Pak Myong-chol	박명철	No	No	No
68	Pak Su-gil	박수길	No	No	No
69	Pak Sung-won	박승원	No	No	No
70	Pak Jong-sun	박정순	No	No	No
71	Pak Jong-gun	박종근	No	No	Member
72	Pak Jae-gyong	박재경	No	No	No
73	Pak Thae-dok	박태덕	No	No	Member
74	Pak Ui-chun	박의춘	No	No	No
75	Pyon Yong-rip	변영립	No	No	No
76	Pyon In-son	변인선	No	No	No
77	Paek Se-bong	백세봉	No	No	No
78	Song Ja-rip	성자립	No	No	No
79	Jang Pyong-gyu	장병규	No	No	Member
80	Jang Song-thaek	장성택	No	No	No
81	Jang Chol	장철	No	No	Member
82	Jon Kil-su	전길수	No	No	No
83	Jon Ryong-guk	전룡국	No	No	No
84	Jon Pyong-ho	전병호	Alternate	Member	No
85	Jon Jin-su	전진수	No	Alternate	No
86	Jon Chang-bok	전창복	No	No	No
87	Jon Ha-chol	전하철	Alternate	Alternate	No
88	Jon Hui-jong	전희정	No	Member	No
89	Jong Myong-do	정명도	No	No	No
90	Jong Ho-gyun	정호균	No	No	No
91	Jong In-guk	정인국	No	No	Member
92	Jo Kyong-chol	조경철	No	No	Member
93	Jo Myong-rok	조명록	No	Member	No
94	Jo Pyong-ju	조병주	No	No	No
95	Ju Kyu-chang	주규창	Alternate	Alternate	Alternate
96	Ju Sang-song	주상성	No	No	No
97	Ju Yong-sik	주영식	No	No	Member
98	Cha Sung-su	차승수	No	No	No
99	Chae Hui-jong	채희정	No	Alternate	No
100	Choe Kyong-song	최경성	No	No	No
101	Choe Ryong-hae	최룡해	No	No	Member
102	Choe Pu-il	최부일	No	No	Member
103	Choe Sang-ryo	최상려	No	No	No
104	Choe Thae-bok	최태복	No	No	Member
105	Choe Hui-jong	최희정	No	No	No
106	Choe Yong-dok	최영덕	No	No	Member
107	Choe Yong-rim	최영림	Member	Member	Member
108	Thae Jong-su	태종수	No	Alternate	Member
109	Han Kwang-bok	한광복	No	No	No
110	Han Tong-gun	한동근	No	No	No
111	Hyon Chol-hae	현철해	No	No	Member
112	Hyon Yong-chol	현영철	No	No	No
113	Hong Sok-hyong	홍석형	No	No	No
114	Hong In-bom	홍인범	No	Alternate	Member
115	An Jong-su	안정수	No	No	Member
116	Yong Tong-hun	양동훈	No	No	Member
117	Yang Hyong-sop	양형섭	Member	Member	Member
118	O Kuk-ryol	오극렬	Member	Member	Member
119	O Kum-chol	오금철	No	No	Alternate
120	O Su-yong	오수용	No	No	Member
121	O Il-jong	오일정	No	No	No
122	U Tong-chuk	우동측	No	No	No
123	Yun Tong-hyon	윤동현	No	No	Member
124	Yun Jong-rin	윤정린	No	No	Member

=== Alternate members elected at the 3rd Conference ===
Rank	Name	Korean	5th CC	1980	7th CC
1	Kang Ki-sop	강기섭	No	No	Alternate
2	Kang Kwan-ju	강관주	No	No	No
3	Kang Kwan-il	강관일	No	No	Alternate
4	Kang Min-chol	강민철	No	No	No
5	Kang Hyong-bong	강형봉	No	No	Alternate
6	Ko Su-il	고수일	No	No	No
7	Kim Kyok-sik	김격식	No	No	No
8	Kim Kye-gwan	김계관	No	No	Member
9	Kim Tong-un	김동은	No	No	No
10	Kim Tong-il	김동일	No	No	Member
11	Kim Tong-i	김동이	No	No	No
12	Kim Tong-il	김동일	No	No	No
13	Kim Pyong-sik	김병식	No	No	No
14	Kim Pyong-hun	김병훈	No	No	No
15	Kim Pong-ryong	김봉룡	No	No	No
16	Kim Chang-myong	김창명	No	No	No
17	Kim Chon-ho	김천호	No	No	No
18	Kim Chung-gol	김충걸	No	No	Alternate
19	Kim Thae-mun	김태문	No	No	No
20	Kim Hui-yong	김희영	No	No	No
21	Kim Yong-suk	김영숙	No	No	No
22	Kim Yong-jae	김영재	No	No	No
23	Kim Yong-ho	김영호	No	No	Member
24	Kim Yong-gwang	김용광	No	No	Alternate
25	Kim U-ho	김우호	No	No	No
26	Kwon Hyok-bong	권혁봉	No	No	No
27	No Kwang-chol	노광철	No	No	Member
28	Tong Jong-ho	동정호	No	No	Member
29	Tong Yong-il	동영일	No	No	Alternate
30	Ryom In-yun	렴인윤	No	No	No
31	Ro Kyong-jun	로경준	No	No	Member
32	Ro Song-sil	로성실	No	No	No
33	Ryu Kyong	류경	No	No	No
34	Ri Kuk-jun	리국준	No	No	Alternate
35	Ri Ki-su	리기수	No	No	No
36	Ri Myong-gil	리명길	No	No	Alternate
37	Ri Min-chol	리민철	No	No	Alternate
38	Ri Sang-gun	리상근	No	No	No
39	Ri Song-gwon	리성권	No	No	Alternate
40	Ri Su-yong	리수용	No	No	Member
41	Ri Jong-sik	리종식	No	No	Member
42	Ri Jae-il	리재일	No	No	Member
43	Ri Je-son	리제선	No	No	No
44	Ri Chan-hwa	리찬화	No	No	Alternate
45	Ri Chang-han	리창한	No	No	Member
46	Ri Chol	리철	No	No	Alternate
47	Ri Chun-il	리춘일	No	No	No
48	Ri Thae-sop	리태섭	No	No	Member
49	Ri Thae-chol	리태철	No	No	No
50	Ri Hong-sop	리홍섭	No	No	Member
51	Ri Hi-su	리히수	No	No	No
52	Ri Yong-ju	리용주	No	No	Member
53	Ri Yong-ho	리용호	No	No	Member
54	Ri Il-nam	리일남	No	No	No
55	Pak Pong-ju	박봉주	No	Alternate	Member
56	Pak Chang-bom	박창범	No	No	Alternate
57	Pang Ri-sun	방리순	No	No	No
58	Paek Kye-ryong	백계룡	No	No	No
59	Paek Ryong-chon	백룡천	No	No	No
60	So Tong-myong	서동명	No	No	No
61	Son Chong-nam	손청남	No	No	No
62	Song Kwang-chol	송광철	No	No	Alternate
63	Sin Sung-hun	신승훈	No	No	No
64	Jang Myong-hak	장명학	No	No	Alternate
65	Jang Yong-gol	장영걸	No	No	No
66	Jang Ho-chan	장호찬	No	No	No
67	Jon Kyong-son	전경선	No	No	Member
68	Jon Kwang-rok	전광록	No	No	No
69	Jon Song-ung	전성웅	No	No	No
70	Jon Chang-rim	전창림	No	No	No
71	Jong Myong-hak	정명학	No	No	Alternate
72	Jong Mong-phil	정몽필	No	No	Alternate
73	Jong Pong-gun	정봉근	No	No	No
74	Jong Un-hak	정운학	No	No	No
75	Jo Song-hwan	조성환	No	No	No
76	Jo Jae-yong	조재영	No	No	No
77	Jo Yong-chol	조영철	No	No	Alternate
78	Ji Jae-ryong	지재룡	No	No	Alternate
79	Cha Kyong-il	차경일	No	No	Alternate
80	Cha Jin-sun	차진순	No	No	Alternate
81	Cha Yong-myong	차용명	No	No	No
82	Choe Ki-ryong	최기룡	No	No	No
83	Choe Kwan-jun	최관준	No	No	No
84	Choe Tae-il	최대일	No	No	No
85	Choe Pong-ho	최봉호	No	No	Alternate
86	Choe Chan-gon	최찬건	No	No	Alternate
87	Choe Chun-sik	최춘식	No	No	No
88	Choe Hyon	최현	No	No	No
89	Choe Yong-do	최영도	No	No	No
90	Choe Yong	최용	No	No	No
91	Thae Hyong-chol	태형철	No	No	Member
92	Han Chang-nam	한창남	No	No	No
93	Han Chang-sun	한창순	No	No	Member
94	Han Hung-phyo	한흥표	No	No	No
95	Ho Song-gil	허성길	No	No	No
96	Hyon Sang-ju	현상주	No	No	No
97	Hong Kwang-sun	홍광순	No	No	No
98	Hong So-hon	홍서헌	No	No	Member
99	Hong Sung-mu	홍승무	No	No	Member
100	Hwang Pyong-so	황병서	No	No	Member
101	Hwang Sun-hui	황순희	Member	Member	Alternate
102	Hwang Hak-won	황학원	No	No	No
103	An Tong-chun	안동춘	No	No	Alternate
104	Yang In-guk	양인국	No	No	No
105	O Chol-san	오철산	No	No	No
