= 6th Politburo of the Workers' Party of Korea =

The 6th Politburo of the Workers' Party of Korea (WPK) (6차 조선로동당 정치국), officially the Political Bureau of the 6th Central Committee of the Workers' Party of Korea, was elected by the 1st Plenary Session of the 6th Central Committee in the immediate aftermath of the 6th WPK Congress.

== Composition ==
=== Members elected in 1980 ===
Rank	Name	Korean	5th PC (Note: Status in the Political Committee at the end of the 5th Central Committee's term.)	2010 (Note: Status in the Politburo at the plenary meeting of the 6th Central Committee on 28 September 2010.)	7th PB (Note: Status in the Politburo at the start of the 7th Central Committee's term.)
1	Kim Il Sung (Note: Kim Il Sung died on 8 July 1994.)	김일성	Member	No	No
2	Kim Il (Note: Kim Il died on 9 March 1984.)	김일	Member	No	No
3	O Jin-u (Note: O Jin-u died on 25 February 1995.)	오진우	Member	No	No
4	Kim Jong Il	김정일	Member	Yes	No
5	Ri Jong-ok (Note: Ri Jong-ok died on 23 September 1999.)	리종옥	Member	No	No
6	Pak Song-chol (Note: Pak Song-chol died on 28 October 2008.)	박성철	Member	No	No
7	Choe Hyon (Note: Choe Hyon died on 9 April 1982.)	최현	Member	No	No
8	Rim Chun-chu (Note: Rim Chun-chu died on 27 April 1988.)	림춘추	No	No	No
9	So Chol (Note: So Chol died on 30 September 1992.)	서철	Member	No	No
10	O Paek-ryong (Note: O Paek-ryong died on 6 April 1984.)	오백룡	Member	No	No
11	Kim Jung-rin (Note: Recalled as a member of the Politburo.)	김중린	Member	No	No
12	Kim Yong-nam	김영남	No	Yes	Member
13	Jon Mun-sop	전문섭	Member	No	No
14	Kim Hwan	김환	No	No	No
15	Yon Hyong-muk	연형묵	Member	No	No
16	O Kuk-ryol	오극렬	No	No	No
17	Kye Ung-thae (Note: Kye Ung-thae was later recalled as a member. He returned as a member by being by-elected on 11 March 1988, from alternate members.)	계응태	No	No	No
18	Kang Song-san (Note: Kang Song-san died on 25 June 2000.)	강성산	Alternate	No	No
19	Paek Hak-rim	백학림	No	No	No
—	Choe Yong-rim (Note: Choe Yong-rim was by-elected as a member on 31 August 1982, from alternate members, but was later recalled as a member.)	최영림	No	Member	No
—	So Yun-sok (Note: So Yun-sok was by-elected as a member on 31 August 1982, from alternate members, but died on an unknown date.)	서윤석	No	No	No
—	Ho Dam (Note: Ho Dam was by-elected as a member on 1 December 1983, from alternate members, but died on 11 May 1991.)	허담	Alternate	No	No
—	Ri Kun-mo (Note: Ri Kun-mo was by-elected as a member on 27 December 1986, from alternate members, but was later recalled.)	리근모	No	No	No
—	Hong Song-nam (Note: Hong Song-nam was directly by-elected as a member on 27 December 1986, but was later recalled.)	홍성남	No	No	No
—	Jon Pyong-ho (Note: Jon Pyong-ho was by-elected as a member on 30 November 1988, from alternate members.)	전병호	No	Member	No
—	Choe Kwang (Note: Choe Kwang was by-elected as a member on 23 May 1990, from alternate members, but died on 21 February 1997.)	최광	No	No	No
—	Han Song-ryong (Note: Han Song-ryong was by-elected as a member on 23 May 1990, from alternate members, but died on 2 February 2009.)	한성룡	No	No	No
—	Kim Yong-ju (Note: Kim Yong-ju was directly by-elected as a member on December 8, 1993.)	김영주	No	No	No

=== Alternate members elected in 1980 ===
Rank	Name	Korean	5th PC (Note: Status in the Political Committee at the end of the 5th Central Committee's term.)	2010 (Note: Status in the Politburo at the plenary meeting of the 6th Central Committee on 28 September 2010.)	7th PB (Note: Status in the Politburo at the start of the 7th Central Committee's term.)
1	Ho Dam (Note: Ho Dam was by-elected as a member on 1 December 1983.)	허담	Alternate	No	No
2	Yun Ki-bok (Note: Recalled as an alternate member.)	윤기복	No	No	No
3	Choe Kwang (Note: Choe Kwang was by-elected as a member on 23 May 1990.)	최광	No	No	No
4	Jo Se-ung	조세웅	No	No	No
5	Choe Jae-u	최재우	No	No	No
6	Kong Jin-thae	공진태	No	No	No
7	Jong Jun-gi	정준기	No	No	No
8	Kim Chol-man (Note: Kim Chol-man was recalled as an alternate member, but returned by being by-elected on 23 May 1990.)	김철만	Alternate	No	No
9	Jong Kyong-hui	정경희	No	No	No
10	Choe Yong-rim (Note: Choe Yong-rim was by-elected as a member on 31 August 1982, but returned as an alternate member by being by-elected on 23 May 1990.)	최영림	No	Member	No
11	So Yun-sok (Note: So Yun-sok was by-elected as a member on 31 August 1982.)	서윤석	No	No	No
12	Ri Kun-mo (Note: Ri Kun-mo was by-elected as a member on 27 December 1986.)	리근모	No	No	No
13	Hyon Mu-gwang (Note: Hyon Mu-gwang died on 28 March 1992.)	현무광	Alternate	No	No
14	Kim Kang-hwan	김강환	No	No	No
15	Ri Son-sil (Note: Ri Son-sil died on 7 August 2000.)	리선실	No	No	No
—	Kang Hui-won (Note: Kang Hui-won was by-elected as an alternate member on 2 April 1981, but died on 28 July 1994.)	강희원	No	No	No
—	Hong Song-nam (Note: Hong Song-nam was by-elected as an alternate member on 3 April 1982, but was later recalled. He returned as an alternate member by being by-elected on 8 February 1986, and was by-elected as a member on 27 December 1986. Hong was by-elected again as an alternate member in December 1988, but died on 31 March 2009.)	홍성남	No	No	No
—	Jon Pyong-ho (Note: Jon Pyong-ho was by-elected as an alternate member on 31 August 1982, and as a member on 30 November 1988.)	전병호	No	Member	No
—	Kim Tu-nam (Note: Kim Tu-nam was by-elected as an alternate member on 31 August 1982, but was later recalled.)	김두남	No	No	No
—	An Sung-hak (Note: An Sung-hak was by-elected as an alternate member on 17 June 1983, but was later recalled.)	안승학	No	No	No
—	Han Song-ryong (Note: Han Song-ryong was by-elected as an alternate member on 17 June 1983, but was later recalled. He returned as an alternate member by being by-elected on 30 November 1988, and was by-elected as a member on 23 May 1990.)	한성룡	No	No	No
—	Kim Pok-sin (Note: Kim Pok-sin was by-elected as an alternate member on 17 June 1983, but was later recalled.)	김복신	No	No	No
—	Hong Si-hak (Note: Hong Si-hak was by-elected as an alternate member on 8 February 1986, but was later recalled.)	홍시학	No	No	No
—	Choe Thae-bok (Note: Choe Thae-bok was by-elected as an alternate member on 23 May 1990.)	최태복	No	Member	Member
—	Kim Tal-hyon (Note: Kim Tal-hyon was by-elected as an alternate member on 20 December 1992, but was later recalled.)	김달현	No	No	No
—	Kim Yong-sun (Note: Kim Yong-sun was by-elected as an alternate member on 20 December 1992, but was later recalled.)	김용순	No	No	No
—	Yang Hyong-sop (Note: Yang Hyong-sop was by-elected as an alternate member on 8 December 1993.)	양형섭	No	Member	Member
—	Hong Sok-hyong (Note: Hong Sok-hyong was by-elected as an alternate member on 8 December 1993.)	홍석형	No	Member	No

=== Members elected in 2010 ===
Rank	Name	Korean	5th PC (Note: Status in the Political Committee at the end of the 5th Central Committee's term.)	1980 (Note: Status in the Politburo at the 1st Plenary Meeting of the 6th Central Committee on 14 October 1980.)	7th PB (Note: Status in the Politburo at the start of the 7th Central Committee's term.)
1	Kim Jong Il (Note: Kim Jong Il died on 17 December 2011.)	김정일	Member	Yes	No
2	Kim Yong-nam	김영남	No	Yes	Member
3	Choe Yong-rim (Note: Recalled as a member.)	최영림	No	No	No
4	Jo Myong-rok (Note: Jo Myong-rok died on 6 November 2010.)	조명록	No	No	No
5	Ri Yong-ho (Note: Ri Yong-ho was removed as a member on 15 July 2012.)	리영호	No	No	No
6	Kim Yong-chun	김영춘	No	No	No
7	Jon Pyong-ho	전병호	No	No	No
8	Kim Kuk-thae (Note: Kim Kuk-thae died on 13 December 2013.)	김국태	No	No	No
9	Kim Ki-nam	김기남	No	No	Member
10	Choe Thae-bok	최태복	No	No	Member
11	Yang Hyong-sop	양형섭	No	No	Member
12	Kang Sok-ju	강석주	No	No	No
13	Pyon Yong-rip	변영립	No	No	No
14	Ri Yong-mu	리용무	No	No	No
15	Ju Sang-song	주상성	No	No	No
16	Hong Sok-hyong	홍석형	No	No	No
17	Kim Kyong-hui	김경희	No	No	No
—	Kim Jong Un (Note: Kim Jong Un was directly by-elected as a member on 11 April 2012.)	김정은	No	No	Member
—	Choe Ryong-hae (Note: Choe Ryong-hae was directly by-elected as a member on 11 April 2012.)	최룡해	No	No	Member
—	Kim Jong-gak (Note: Kim Jong-gak was by-elected as a member on 11 April 2012, from alternate members, but was later recalled.)	김정각	No	No	No
—	Jang Song-thaek (Note: Jang Song-thaek was by-elected as a member on 11 April 2012, from alternate members, but was removed on 8 December 2013.)	장성택	No	No	No
—	Pak To-chun (Note: Pak To-chun was by-elected as a member on 11 April 2012, from alternate members, but was later recalled.)	박도춘	No	No	No
—	Hyon Chol-hae (Note: Hyon Chol-hae was directly by-elected as a member on 11 April 2012, but was later recalled.)	현철해	No	No	No
—	Kim Won-hong (Note: Kim Won-hong was directly by-elected as a member on 11 April 2012.)	김원홍	No	No	Member
—	Ri Myong-su (Note: Ri Myong-su was directly by-elected as a member on 11 April 2012.)	리명수	No	No	Member
—	Pak Pong-ju (Note: Pak Pong-ju was directly by-elected as a member on 31 March 2013.)	박봉주	No	No	Member
—	Hwang Pyong-so (Note: Hwang Pyong-so was directly by-elected as a member on 18 February 2015.)	황병서	No	No	Member
—	Kwak Pom-gi (Note: Kwak Pom-gi was by-elected as a member on 18 February 2015, from alternate members.)	곽범기	No	No	Member
—	O Su-yong (Note: O Su-yong was by-elected as a member on 18 February 2015, from alternate members.)	오수용	No	No	Member
—	Kim Yang-gon (Note: Kim Yang-gon was by-elected as a member on 18 February 2015, from alternate members, but died on 29 December 2015.)	김양건	No	No	No

=== Alternate members elected in 2010 ===
Rank	Name	Korean	5th PC (Note: Status in the Political Committee at the end of the 5th Central Committee's term.)	1980 (Note: Status in the Politburo at the 1st Plenary Meeting of the 6th Central Committee on 14 October 1980.)	7th PB (Note: Status in the Politburo at the start of the 7th Central Committee's term.)
1	Kim Yang-gon (Note: Kim Yang-gon was by-elected as a member on 18 February 2015.)	김양건	No	No	No
2	Kim Yong-il (Note: Recalled as an alternate member.)	김영일	No	No	No
3	Pak To-chun (Note: Pak To-chun was by-elected as a member on 11 April 2012.)	박도춘	No	No	No
4	Choe Ryong-hae (Note: Choe Ryong-hae was by-elected as a member on 11 April 2012.)	최룡해	No	No	Member
5	Jang Song-thaek (Note: Jang Song-thaek was by-elected as a member on 11 April 2012.)	장성택	No	No	No
6	Ju Kyu-chang	주규창	No	No	No
7	Ri Thae-nam	리태남	No	No	No
8	Kim Rak-hui	김락희	No	No	No
9	Thae Jong-su	태종수	No	No	No
10	Kim Phyong-hae	김평해	No	No	No
11	U Tong-chuk	우동측	No	No	No
12	Kim Jong-gak (Note: Kim Jong-gak was by-elected as a member on 11 April 2012, from alternate members, but was later recalled.)	김정각	No	No	No
13	Pak Jong-sun (Note: Pak Jong-sun died on 22 January 2011.)	박정순	No	No	No
14	Kim Chang-sop	김창섭	No	No	No
15	Mun Kyong-dok	문경덕	No	No	No
—	Kwak Pom-gi (Note: Kwak Pom-gi was by-elected as an alternate member on 11 April 2012, and as a member on 18 February 2015.)	곽범기	No	No	Member
—	O Kuk-ryol (Note: O Kuk-ryol was by-elected as an alternate member on 11 April 2012.)	오극렬	No	Member	No
—	Ro Tu-chol (Note: Ro Tu-chol was by-elected as an alternate member on 11 April 2012.)	로두철	No	No	Member
—	Ri Pyong-sam (Note: Ri Pyong-sam was by-elected as an alternate member on 11 April 2012, but was later recalled.)	리병삼	No	No	No
—	Jo Yon-jun (Note: Jo Yon-jun was by-elected as an alternate member on 11 April 2012.)	조연준	No	No	Alternate
—	Hyon Yong-chol (Note: Hyon Yong-chol was by-elected as an alternate member on 31 March 2013, but was later removed.)	현영철	No	No	No
—	Kim Kyok-sik (Note: Kim Kyok-sik was by-elected as an alternate member on 31 March 2013, but was later recalled.)	김격식	No	No	No
—	Choe Pu-il (Note: Choe Pu-il was by-elected as an alternate member on 31 March 2013.)	최부일	No	No	Member
—	O Su-yong (Note: O Su-yong was by-elected as an alternate member on 8 April 2014, and as a member on 18 February 2015.)	오수용	No	No	Member
—	Ri Yong-gil (Note: Ri Yong-gil was by-elected as an alternate member on 8 April 2014.)	리영길	No	No	Alternate
