= 5th Political Committee of the Workers' Party of Korea =

The 5th Political Committee of the Workers' Party of Korea (WPK), officially the Standing Committee of the 5th Congress of the Workers' Party of Korea, was elected by the 1st Plenary Session of the 5th Central Committee on 12 November 1970.

== Members ==
Rank	Name	Hangul	Office	4th POL	6th POL
1	Kim Il Sung	김일성	General Secretary of the WPK Central Committee	Old	Reelected
2	Choe Yong-gon	최용건	—	Old	Dead
3	Kim Il	김일	—	Old	Reelected
4	Pak Song-chol	박성철	—	Old	Reelected
5	Choe Hyon	최현	—	New	Reelected
6	Kim Yong-ju	김영주	—	Old	Removed
7	O Jin-u	오진우	—	Old	Reelected
8	Kim Tong-gyu	김동규	—	New	Expelled
9	So Chol	서철	—	New	Reelected
10	Kim Chung-nin	김중린	—	New	Reelected
11	Han Ik-su	한익수	—	New	Dead

== Candidates ==
Rank	Name	Hangul	Office	4th POL	6th POL
1	Hyon Mu-gwang	현무광	—	New	Demoted
2	Chong Chun-taek	정춘택	—	New	Demoted
3	Yang Hyong-sop	양형섭	—	New	Demoted
4	Kim Man-gum	김만금	—	New	Demoted

== Add-ons ==
Rank	Name	Hangul	Office	Elected	6th POL
1	Kim Jong Il	김일성	—	Full	Reelected
2	Kim Yong-nam	김영남	—	Full	Reelected
3	Choe Yong-jin	최용진	—	Alternate	Demoted
4	Yi Kun-mo	리근모	—	Alternate	Reelected
5	Ri Jong-ok	리종옥	—	Alternate	Full
6	O Kuk-ryol	오극렬	—	Alternate	Full
