= 4th Political Committee of the Workers' Party of Korea =

The 4th Political Committee of the Workers' Party of Korea (WPK), officially the Political Committee of the 4th Central Committee (4th CC), was elected in the immediate aftermath of the 4th WPK Congress on 18 September 1961 by the 4th CC's 1st Plenary Session.

The 2nd Conference, held on 6 October 1966, established a Standing Committee of the Political Committee (SCPC).

It sat until the 4th Congress when it was replaced by the 5th Political Committee.

== Members ==
=== 1st Plenary Session (1961–66) ===
Rank	Name	Hangul	Government posts	1st STC	2nd CON	Type
1	Kim Il Sung	김일성	Central: Chairman of the WPK Central Committee	Old	Reelected	Member
2	Choe Yong-gon	최용건	Central: Vice Chairman of the WPK Central Committee	Old	Reelected	Member
3	Kim Il	김일	Central: Vice Chairman of the WPK Central Committee	Old	Reelected	Member
4	Pak Kum-chol	박금철	—	Old	Reelected	Member
5	Kim Chang-man	김창만	—	Alternate	Demoted	Member
6	Yi Hyo-sun	이효선	—	Alternate	Reelected	Member
7	Pak Chong-ae	박정애	—	Old	Demoted	Member
8	Kim Kwang-hyop	김광협	—	Old	Demoted	Member
9	Jong Il-ryong	종일용	—	Old	Reelected	Member
10	Nam Il	남일	—	Old	Demoted	Member
11	Yi Chong-ok	리종옥	—	New	Demoted	Member
12	Kim Ik-son	김익손	—	New	Full	Alternate
13	Yi Chu-yon	이추연	—	New	Demoted	Alternate
14	Ha Ang-chon	하앙촌	—	New	Demoted	Alternate
15	Han Sang-du	한상두	—	New	Demoted	Alternate

=== 2nd Conference (1966–70) ===
Rank	Name	Hangul	Government posts	2nd CON	5th POL	Type
1	Kim Il Sung	김일성	Central: Chairman of the WPK Central Committee	Old	Reelected	SCPC
2	Choe Yong-gon	최용건	Central: Vice Chairman of the WPK Central Committee	Old	Reelected	SCPC
3	Kim Il	김일	Central: Vice Chairman of the WPK Central Committee	Old	Reelected	SCPC
4	Pak Kum-chol	박금철	—	Old	Expelled	SCPC
5	Yi Hyo-sun	이효선	—	Old	Expelled	SCPC
6	Kim Kwang-hyop	김광협	—	Old	Reelected	SCPC
7	Kim Ik-son	김익손	—	Alternate	Reelected	Member
8	Kim Chang-bong	김익손	—	New	Demoted	Member
9	Pak Song-chol	박성철	—	New	Reelected	Member
10	Choe Hyon	최현	—	New	Reelected	Member
11	Yi Yong-ho	이용호	—	New	Demoted	Member
12	Sok San	속산	—	New	Demoted	Alternate
13	Ho Bong-hak	허봉학	—	New	Demoted	Alternate
14	Choe Kwang	최광	—	New	Reelected	Alternate
15	O Jin-u	오진우	—	New	Full	Alternate
16	Yim Chun-chu	임춘추	—	New	Full	Alternate
17	Kim Tong-gyu	김동규	—	New	Demoted	Alternate
18	Kim Yong-ju	김영주	—	New	Demoted	Alternate
19	Pak Yong-guk	박용국	—	New	Demoted	Alternate
20	Chong Kyong-bok	종경복	—	New	Demoted	Alternate
