= 咸鏡北道 =

咸鏡北道 may refer to:

- North Hamgyong Province
- Kankyōhoku-dō
