= O Paek-ryong =

North Korean politician and general

- 오백룡

WPK Politburo member
- Chairman: Kim Il Sung

Personal details
- Born: 1913 Hoeryong, Kankyōhoku-dō, Korea, Empire of Japan
- Died: April 6, 1984 (aged 70–71)
- Citizenship: North Korean
- Party: Workers' Party of Korea
- Occupation: Politician

Military service
- Allegiance: North Korea
- Branch/service: Korean People's Army
- Rank: Daejang (General)

- O Paek-ryong
- Hangul: 오백룡
- Hanja: 吳白龍
- RR: O Baekryong
- MR: O Paengnyong

O Paek-ryong (Korean: 오백룡; October 24, 1913 – April 6, 1984) was a North Korean politician and general.

== Biography ==
O was born in 1913, in Hoeryong, Kankyōhoku-dō, Korea, Empire of Japan (now in North Hamgyong Province, North Korea). His family, who had spent a brief childhood in Chongjin, moved to Manchuria in 1919, where he spent the later part of his life. He joined a secret anti-Japanese underground group in Manchuria in 1933 and enlisted in the Northeast Anti-Japanese Alliance in 1937 to participate in the Battle of Pochonbo.

After the formal establishment of North Korea, he became the commander of the 1st Brigade of the Ministry of Interior of North Korea in 1949, and participated in the Korean War in 1950 as the commander of the 8th division of the Korean People's Army, in 1951 he became commander of the 23rd Ground Battle Brigade of the 6th Corps and in 1953, he was appointed as deputy commander of the 7th Corps of the Korean People's Army with the rank of major general. In 1967 he was promoted to promoted to lieutenant general and became Deputy Minister of State Security. In 1969 he was appointed as Vice Chairman of the Central Military Commission of the Workers' Party of Korea and assumed the position of Commander-in-Chief of the Worker-Peasant Red Guards. In 1972 he was appointed deputy chairman of the National Defense Commission under the Central People's Committee and promoted to general. In March 1977, he was elected a candidate (non-voting) member of the politburo and in October that year he was promoted to a full (voting) member. In 1980 he was elected to the 6th Politburo of the Workers' Party of Korea, serving as a member of the 6th Central Military Commission. In 1982 he was awarded the Order of Kim Il Sung. In March 1982, he served as a member of the funeral commission of Chon Chang-chol, in April of Choe Hyon and in January 1983 of Kang Ryang-uk. He died in 1984. His son, O Kum-chol is a high-ranking official in North Korea.
