= 43rd Division (North Korea) =

Military division of the Korean People's Army

The 43rd Infantry Division (Korean: 조선인민군 륙군 제43사단) was a military formation of the Korean People's Army.

It defended the Yesong River crossing and the coastal area beyond the river that lies west of the Kaesong/Kumchon County line.

== History ==
During the outbreak of the Korean War, Senior Colonel O Jin-u was placed as commander of the 43rd Infantry Division.

The 1st Cavalry Division's 7th Cavalry Regiment traversed the Yesong River and advanced north on the road from Paekchon to the small town of Hanpo-ri, six miles north of Kumchon, where the main Pyongyang road crossed the Yesong River, and established a blocking position.
