= Jang Song-u =

North Korean politician

- 장성우
- Supreme Leader: Kim Il Sung; Kim Jong Il

Personal details
- Born: 7 April 1933 Korea, Empire of Japan
- Died: 24 August 2009 (aged 76) North Korea
- Citizenship: North Korea
- Party: Workers' Party of Korea

Military service
- Allegiance: North Korea
- Branch/service: Korean People's Army
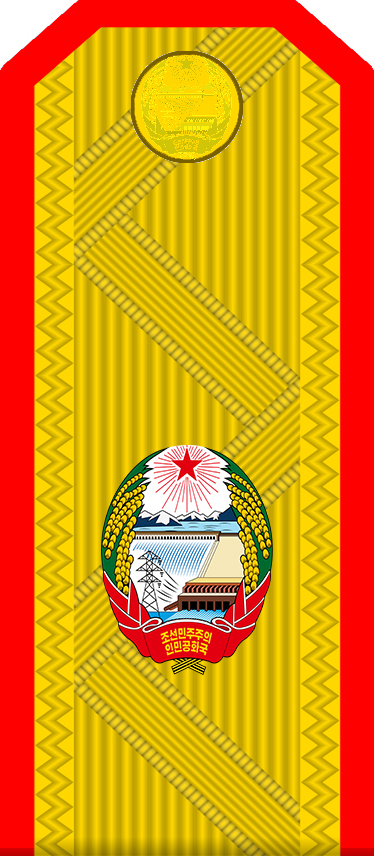
- Rank: Ch'asu (Vice Marshal)

Jang Song-u (Korean: 장성우; Hanja: 張成禹; 7 April 1933 – 24 August 2009) was a North Korean politician and general. He is from Cheonnae-gun, South Hamgyeong Province. As the elder brother of Jang Seong-gil and Jang Song-thaek, he was the chief commander of the 1983 Rangoon bombing at Aung San Mausoleum in Yangon, Myanmar.

== Biography ==
He joined the Workers' Party of Korea in 1973 and was appointed as the head of the central organization's leadership. In 1977, he was promoted to Major General of the Korean People's Army. In October 1980, he was appointed to the 6th Central Committee of the Workers' Party of Korea. In May 1984, he was promoted to lieutenant general of the Korean People's Army. In 1988, he was appointed Head of the Reconnaissance Bureau of the General Staff of the Korean People's Army. In January 1989, he was appointed as the first deputy head of the Ministry of Social Security. In May 1990, promoted to Colonel-general in the Korean People's Army. From December 1991 to November 1995, he served as the political director of the Ministry of Social Security. In April 1992, he was promoted to Army general of the Korean People's Army. From October 1995 to July 1996, he was appointed commander of the Supreme Guard Command. In early July 1996, he was appointed commander of the 3rd Corps of the Korean People's Army. In April 2002, he was promoted to the Vice Marshal of the Korean People's Army. He died in August 2009.
