= 3rd Standing Committee of the Workers' Party of Korea =

The 3rd Standing Committee of the Workers' Party of Korea (WPK) (Korean: 3차 조선로동당 상임위원회), officially the Standing Committee of the 3rd Congress of the Workers' Party of Korea, was elected by the 1st Plenary Session of the 3rd Central Committee on 29 April 1956.

== Members ==
Rank	Name	Hangul	Office	2nd STC	4th POL
1	Kim Il Sung	김일성	Chairman of the WPK Central Committee	Old	Elected
2	Kim Tu-bong	김두봉	—	Old	Expelled
3	Choe Yong-gon	최용건	—	New	Elected
4	Pak Chong-ae	박정애	Vice Chairman of the WPK Central Committee	Old	Elected
5	Kim Il	김일	Vice Chairman of the WPK Central Committee	New	Elected
6	Pak Kum-chol	박금철	Vice Chairman of the WPK Central Committee	Old	Elected
7	Yim Hae	임해	—	New	Demoted
8	Choe Chang-ik	최창익	—	Old	Expelled
9	Jong Il-ryong	종일용	—	Old	Elected
10	Kim Kwang-hyop	김광협	—	Old	Elected
11	Nam Il	남일	—	Old	Elected
