= Cho Ki-chon =

North Korean poet (1913–1951)

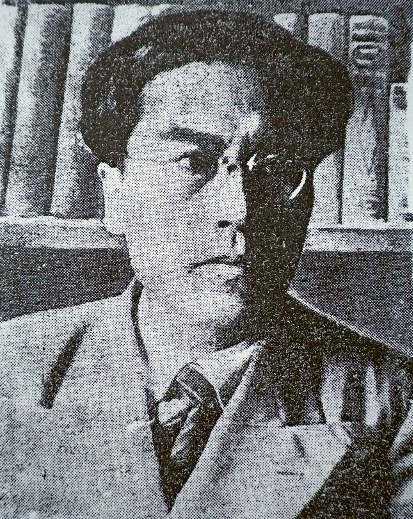
- Born: 6 November 1913; Ael'tugeu, Vladivostok, Russia
- Died: 31 July 1951 (aged 37); Pyongyang, North Korea
- Resting place: Patriotic Martyrs' Cemetery
- Other names: "Korea's Mayakovsky"; "Pushkin of Korea"
- Education: Gorky Omsk State Pedagogical University
- Occupation: Poet
- Spouse: Kim Hae-sŏn (m. late 1930s)
- Children: Yurii Cho
- Writing career
- Language: Korean
- Genres: Epic poetry, lyric poetry
- Subject: Cult of personality of Kim Il Sung
- Notable works: Mt. Paeketu, "Whistle"
- Notable awards: Festival Prize; Order of the National Flag, 2nd class (1951); National Prize, 1st class for Mt. Paektu (1948) and Korea is Fighting (1952)
- Movement: Socialist realism

Korean name
- Hangul: 조기천
- Hanja: 趙基天
- RR: Jo Gicheon
- MR: Cho Kich'ŏn

Cho Ki-chon (Korean: 조기천; 6 November 1913 – 31 July 1951) was a Soviet-born North Korean poet. He is regarded as a national poet and "founding father of North Korean poetry" whose distinct Soviet-influenced style of lyrical epic poetry in the socialist realist genre became an important feature of North Korean literature. He was nicknamed "Korea's Mayakovsky" after the writer whose works had had an influence on him and which implied his breaking from the literature of the old society and his commitment to communist values. Since a remark made by Kim Jong Il on his 2001 visit to Russia, North Korean media has referred to Cho as the "Pushkin of Korea".

Cho was dispatched by the Soviet authorities to liberated Korea when the Red Army entered in 1945. By that time, he had substantial experience with Soviet literature and literature administration. The Soviets hoped that Cho would shape the cultural institutions of the new state based on the Soviet model. For the Soviets, the move was successful, and Cho did not only that but also significantly developed socialist realism as it would become the driving force of North Korean literature and arts.

Cho offered some of the earliest contributions to Kim Il Sung's cult of personality. His most famous work is Mt. Paektu (1947), a lyrical epic praising Kim Il Sung's guerrilla activities and promoting him as a suitable leader for the new North Korean state. Other notable works by Cho include "Whistle", a seemingly non-political love poem which was later adapted as a popular song that is known in both North and South Korea.

During the Korean War, Cho wrote wartime propaganda poems. He died during the war in an American bombing raid. He and his works are still renowned in North Korean society.

== Life and career ==
Cho Ki-chon was born to poor Korean peasants in the village of Ael'tugeu not far from Ussuriysk in the Vladivostok District of the Russian Far East on 6 November 1913. (Note: According to biographer Tatiana Gabroussenko, Cho's place of birth in Russia is verified by both Soviet records as well as his friends and relatives. Both North Korean and some South Korean sources incorrectly state that he was born in Wonsan-ri, Hoeryong County, North Hamgyong Province in Korea.) The Pacific region of the Soviet Union, where he lived, was a center for Korean independence activists. He particularly drew literary inspiration from Cho Myong-hui, a fellow Korean writer living in the Soviet Union who – in believing in national emancipation by upholding socialist principles – had already written about anti-Japanese guerrillas. Thus he acquired a nationalistic and class conscious worldview in his literature.

=== Before emigrating from the Soviet Union ===
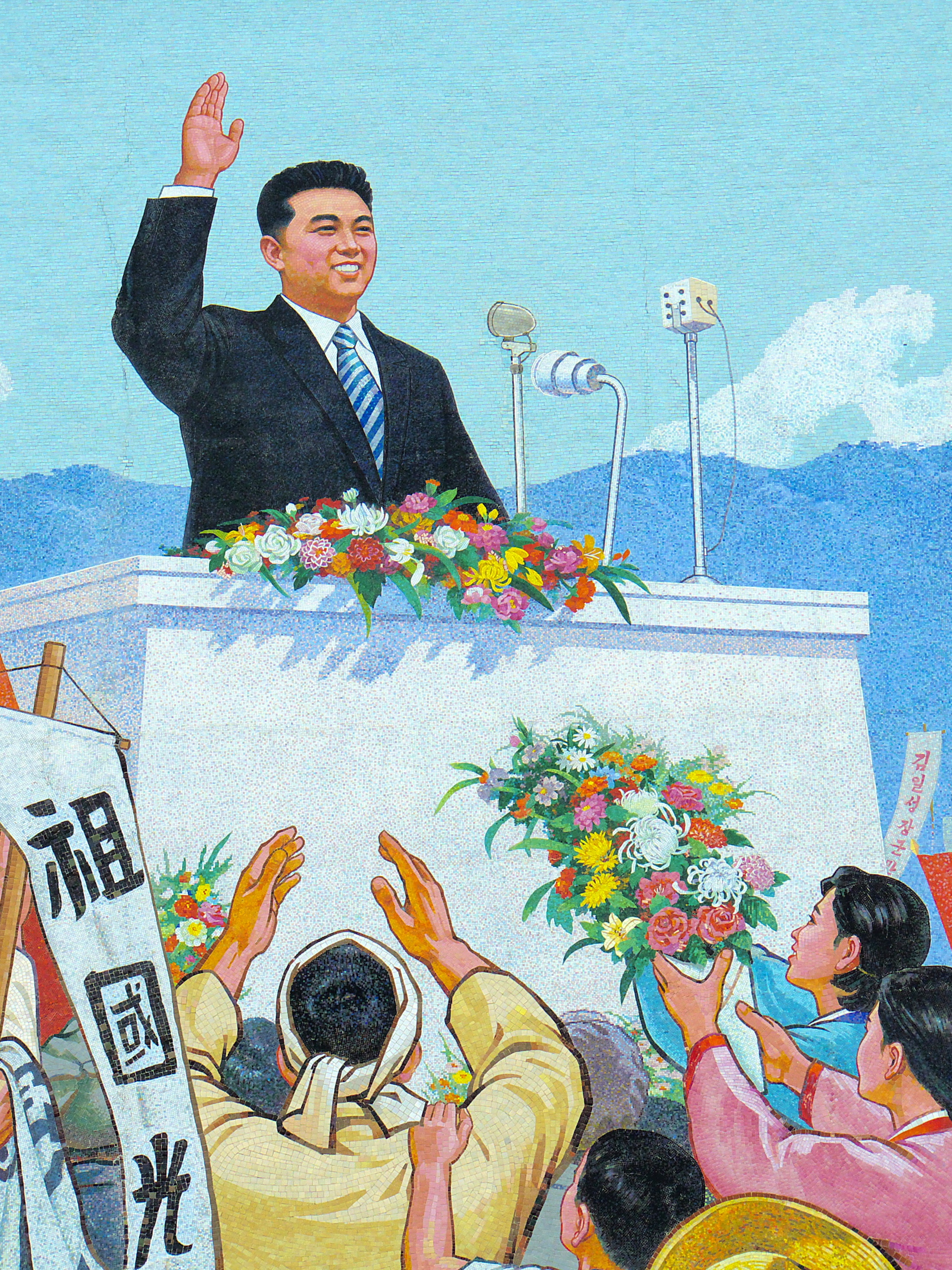
It is possible that Cho translated Kim Il Sung's victory speech of 1945 into Korean. Cho moved to North Korea that year.

Cho studied at the Korean Teachers College in Voroshilov-Ussuriysk between 1928 and 1931. During that time, he was also a member of the communist youth league of the Soviet Union, Komsomol.

Cho was initially supposed to enroll at the Moscow University, but he was robbed at a train station in Omsk. With no money, Cho was stranded and had to work at a kolkhoz in Omsk for the summer to get some. The rector of the Omsk University, Aleksandr Sergeevitch Slivko was touched by his fate and decided to admit him in the university. Thus, from 1933 until his graduation in 1937, he attended the Faculty of Literature of the Gorky Omsk State Pedagogical University. Although he was not fluent in Russian upon entering the university, he graduated with excellent marks, and his time spent there amplified his Russian and Soviet sides.

He returned to the Far East and took up teaching responsibilities at the Korean Pedagogical Institute in Vladivostok until all ethnic Koreans were forcibly moved to Central Asia, and the Institute along with Cho were relocated to Kzyl-Orda, Kazakh SSR in 1937. The following year Cho went to Moscow and tried to enroll at the Moscow Literature University, only to find himself arrested on the spot for breaking the law confining Koreans to Central Asia. He then returned to the Institute in Kzyl-Orda and worked there until 1941. In the late 1930s, Cho married Kim Hae-sŏn. The two had a son, Yurii Cho, born in 1939.

Between 1942 and 1943, Cho served in the Soviet 25th Army's headquarters in Voroshilov-Ussuriysk in desk duty, and in a similar assignment in the Pacific Navy in Khabarovsk between 1943 and 1945 and in the First Far Eastern Front from October 1945. A part of his job was to write propaganda leaflets spread by the Soviet Red Army in Korea. Biographer Tatiana Gabroussenko thinks it is probable that he also translated the first speech given by Kim Il Sung after the liberation, on 14 October 1945, called "Every Effort for the Building of a New Democratic Korea", into Korean. The original speech was written by Soviet officers. Cho entered North Korea with the Red Army that year.

=== Creating model literature in North Korea ===
Immediately after the liberation of Korea, Soviet authorities sent Cho, who was fluent in both Korean and Russian, to North Korea in order to shape the country's literary institutions on the Soviet model. Cho diligently followed the Workers' Party's instructions to "immerse [oneself] in the masses" and would visit factories, villages and farms and write poems based on these experiences. His experiences in the Soviet Union helped him in producing explicitly political works. Many other authors were not equally adept to write about political subjects and were reluctant to visit places of work.

His role in shaping North Korean literature was to be pivotal. Cho's early works Mt. Paektu (MR: Paektusan, 1947) and Land (MR: Ttang, 1946) would point out the direction that North Korean literature was about to take. These works would soon become models for North Korean literature. Upon his return, he started writing for Chosŏn Sinmun, the Soviet Red Army's Korean-language paper, working as a correspondent and translator. He translated works of such Soviet poets as Mayakovsky, Gribachev, and Jambyl Jabayev.

The literary circles of the time were based on divisions in North Korean politics as a whole. Cho associated himself with the other ethnic Koreans who had come from the Soviet Union. This literary group was close to the political Soviet Koreans faction.

During the Korean War, Cho worked for Rodong Sinmun and also wrote propaganda poems. Before the war, he had been a member of the Standing Committee of the North Korean Literary and Art Federation. In 1951, he was selected the vice-chairman of the unified Korean Federation of Literature and Arts (MR: Chosŏn munhakyesul ch'ongdongmaeng, KFLA) which was chaired by Han Sorya. He was a member of its subdivision called the Literature Organization (MR: Munhak tongmaeng).

== Works ==
=== In the Soviet Union ===
While still at the Pedagogical Institute, Cho released a novel describing the anti-Japanese armed struggle. It is similar in content to his later work Mt. Paektu. The novel might have acted as a prototype for it. In addition to poetry and poetic criticism, Cho was interested in drama. Cho contributed to the creation of a drama called Hong Beom-do, about the revolutionary Hong Beom-do, by Tae Jang-chun and other Koreans living in the Soviet Union. Mt. Paektu retains elements from this work, too. He published his first poem the age of 17 in a Korean newspaper, Sŏnbong, in Russia. Between 1930 and 1933 he wrote poems such as "The Morning of the Construction", "To the Advanced Workers", "The Military Field Study" and "Paris Commune". While still in the Soviet Union, he also wrote poems "To Rangers" and "Outdoor Practice".

=== In North Korea ===
After moving to North Korea, Cho released "New Year". Other poems by him include: "Tuman River" (MR: Tumanggang, 1946) about the suffering of Koreans under Japanese rule and "Our Path" (Uri-ŭi kil, 1949) on Soviet-Korean friendship. The Song of Life (Saeng'ai-ŭi Norae, 1950) is a long epic about industrialization. It praises the country's developing industry but fails to take note of its roots in Japanese projects during the occupation. It also features a theme often found in Stalinist fiction: "class enemies" that seek to hamper progress. Other poems include: Land, "Aircraft Hunters", "On the Burning Street" (Pul'anŭn kŏriesŏ, 1950), "Korean Mother" (Chosŏn-ŭi ŏmŏni, 1950), "My Heights" (Na-ŭi koji, 1951), "We are Korean Youth" (Urinŭn Chosŏn Ch'ŏngnyŏnida, 1951) as well as lyric poems "Swing" (Kŭne) and "Sitting On a White Rock" (Hŭin pauie anjaso, 1947). The serial poem Resistance in Yosu (Hangjaeng-ŭi yŏsu) tells about the Yosu uprising in South Korea. The lyric epic Land was written on the Workers' Party's orders on producing works about the land reform in North Korea after the liberation, and was the first poem to describe the topic. Cho wrote lyrics for "Mungyong Pass", a song about Korean People's Army soldiers fighting their way through Kyonggi to Ryongnam.

While all of the poems are thoroughly ideological, some South Korean scholars such as Yi Chang-ju of the North Research Institution have sought to emphasize Cho's lyrical side in order to "domesticate" him to serve rapprochement between the two countries' cultural orientations. Some of Cho's poems have been adapted into popular music lyrics that enjoy popularity in the South as well as the North. "Whistle", "Willow" (Suyang pŏtŭl) and "Swing" are love songs that were inspired by a more relaxed cultural atmosphere following the translation of Russian-language poetry into Korean. These influences include Mikhail Isakovsky's "Katyusha", to which "Whistle" in particular bears likeness. "Whistle", adapted as a popular song in 1990, is often seen in the South as a non-political song. However, according to Gabroussenko, South Korean observers often fail to notice the political and cultural elements borrowed from Isakovsky and Soviet lyrical poetry. In "Whistle", for instance, the couple embodies exemplary socialist traits:

Today you again smiled purely,
And said that you have overfilled the production plan threefold,
But I do not envy your achievement,
I can do even better,
But I like your smile.
Why is it so pure?

— "Whistle"

==== Mt. Paektu ====
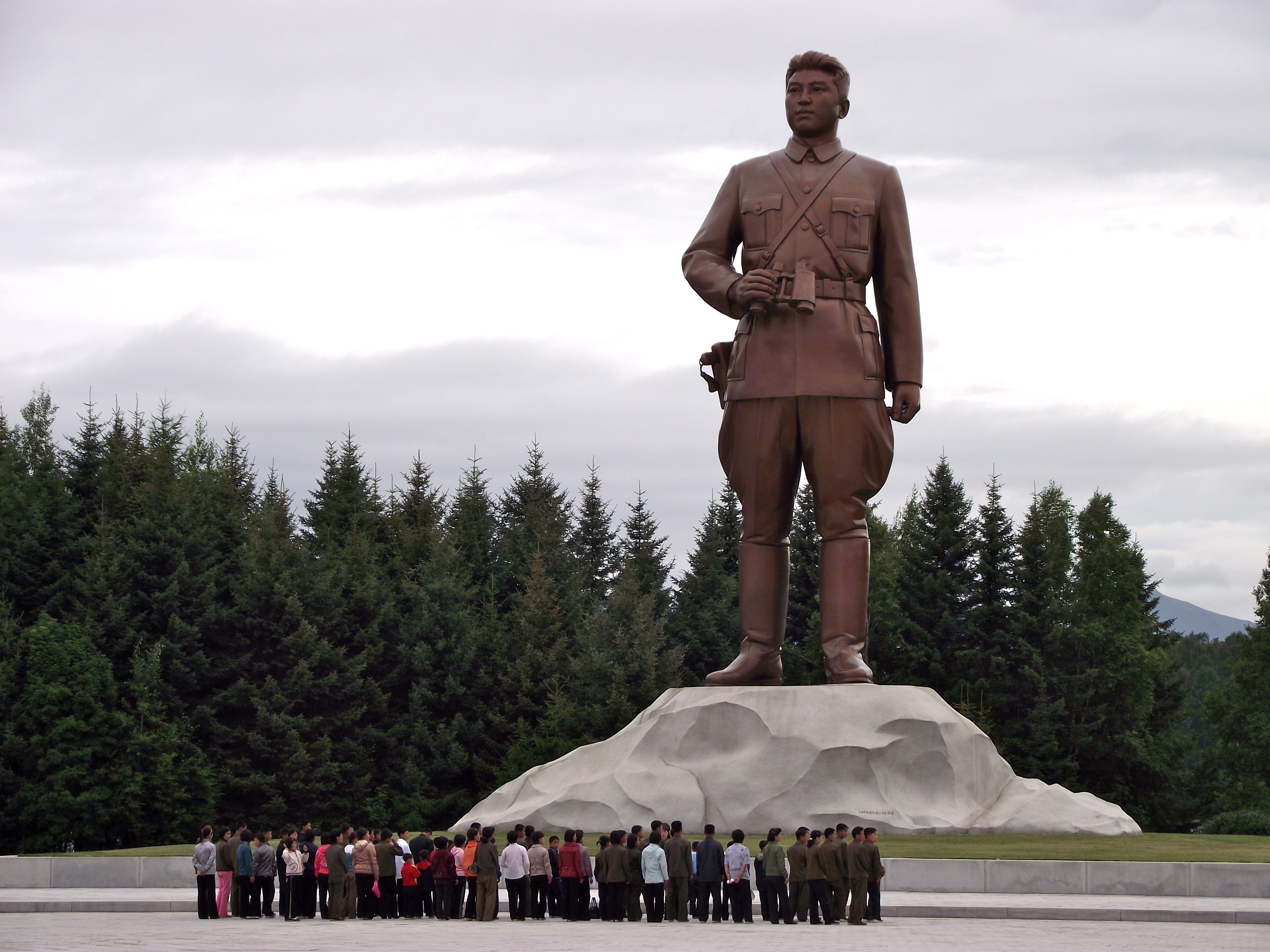
Cho's epic Mt. Paektu promotes Kim Il Sung as a heroic guerrilla well-suited to lead the country.

Cho's long epic poem Mt. Paektu (Note: 백두산; 白頭山; Paektusan) was written in February 1947 and published in 1948 in Rodong Sinmun. It was the first poem written about Kim Il Sung, whom the original version of the poem simply refers to as "Commander Kim". The poem, which tells the story of the Battle of Pochonbo in 1937, is a classic in literature portraying the anti-Japanese struggle. Its text inextricably links Kim Il Sung's person with Paektu Mountain, the namesake height of the poem – a connection that has remained central in North Korean propaganda to this day.

The poem has its origins in Cho's fascination with the anti-Japanese guerrillas, including Rim Chun-chu and Choe Hyon, with whom he had met. The creation of the epic was politically motivated, too, as the Soviets, who had dispatched Cho to North Korea, wanted to strengthen Kim Il Sung's grip on power. Publications presenting him as a legendary anti-Japanese hero were needed, and so Mt. Paektu was born. The work is dedicated "to the glorious Soviet Army that liberated Korea", and is written with the Soviets and not the Koreans in mind.

Due to vigorous promotion of a "mass culture" in both the output and readership of literature, copies of Mt. Paektu were printed by the hundreds of thousands, more than any work in the history of Korean literature before that. Generally speaking, the poem was well received. The public was interested, and young readers acclaimed it. It was liked in the KFLA as it employed revolutionary romanticism in its portrayal of Kim. Kim personally liked the poem, too, and began visiting Cho's home. In his memoirs With the Century, Kim writes that he was the first person to listen to Cho recite the poem and liked its "jewel-like sentences". More than esthetic, Kim says he was attracted to the content and they both "shed tears" when Cho chanted a passage about fallen comrades.

In keeping with its nature as propaganda, the content of Mt. Paektu exaggerates Kim Il Sung's activities during the liberation struggle. The poem presents Kim as having heroic, transcendental, humane and warm qualities. He is represented as a popular hero that the people look up to, suggesting that he is the right person to lead the newly established state. Politically, Mt. Paektu was very effective in the newly founded state. As such, it became a "new classic", a model for the cult of personality of Kim Il Sung perpetuated by subsequent works of literature in North Korea. According to B. R. Myers, the work exemplifies particular traits of an early cult of personality built upon Soviet Marxism–Leninism and bloc conformity, which were soon replaced by Korean ethnic nationalism of writers like Han Sorya. While Cho's Kim Il Sung is a brilliant strategist who has masculine qualities like strength and intellect, in Han's works he embodies traditional Korean virtues of innocence and naivety having "mastered Marxism–Leninism with his heart, not his brain". The ethnically inspired style of Han would establish itself as the standard of propaganda over Cho's. Benoit Berthelier, however, sees continuity in Cho's work and contemporary propaganda. According to him, Cho can be credited with having created a genre of "revolutionary romanticism", which systematized the use of legends and supernatural imagery in Kim and his successors' cult of personality.

Long epic poetry was not a popular genre in North Korea before Mt. Paektu, but it was in the Soviet Union where Cho had immigrated from. Poema and Mayakovsky's prosody and poetry were also among Cho's influences that can be seen in Mt. Paektu. These Russian stylistic influences gave Mt. Paektu its peculiar characteristics that prompted mixed reactions from the North Korean public. For instance, some in the literature circles were unfamiliar with the concept of a lyrical epic and thought of it as an improbable amalgam of genres, criticizing the work for being indistinguishable from ordinary prose. According to North Korean studies scholar Alzo David-West, the relatively favorable reaction to Mt. Paektu compared to some other literature testifies to North Korean readership being capable at being both a receptive and a dismissive audience.

South Korean scholars have presented two competing views about Mt. Paektu: academics of the older generation typically dismiss Mt. Paektu as "personality cult literature". Younger generation minjung and leftist scholars, however, see guerrillas other than Kim Il Sung – such as Ch'ŏl-ho, Kkot-pun, and Sŏk-jun – and by extension, the people, as the "hero" of the story. For some of them, like Sin Tong-ho, excluding the role of others than Kim Il Sung is an outright obstruction for creating a national unity in literature.

The 1947 text has been revised three times because of changes within the political system of North Korea to produce "heavily revised chuch'e [Juche] editions": in 1955, 1986 and 1995. The original version of the poem invokes Russian Civil War heroes Vasily Chapayev, Nikolay Shchors and Sergey Lazo, while a newer revision omits them and concentrates on indigenous assets:

The image of a sad, sighing mother
[/A]ppears before his eyes,
He reads the book,
And acquires new strength, and spies his goal.
And this night
[/H]e also thinks[:]
"Soviet Partisans!
Chapaev, Schors, Lazo...
That's how they fought!"

— Mt. Paektu (1952)

And even when he seems to see his mother
Boiling poor gruel with a mournful sigh,
His saviour is the book
[/T]hat he keeps at his side.
His thoughts
[/A]re these:
"As yet we are but few,
But we are certain of ourselves,
And our assurance lights our way.["]

— Mt. Paektu (1990)

수심에 어린 어머니의 모습이
기억의 쪽문을 열고 들어설 때도
그이는 책을 보았다-
그러면 새 힘을 얻고 목적을 보았다.
이 밤에도 글줄을 밟으며
훨-훨- 걸어가는 생각-
≪우리 비록 적지만
우리 비록 굶으며 피 흘리지만
인민이 우리를 받들거던[≫]

— Mt. Paektu (1947)

The work was adapted on stage by Han T'ae-ch'ŏn. It has been translated into English, Arabic, French, German, Hungarian, Russian, Spanish, Czech, Polish, Chinese, Japanese, and Mongolian. Of these, the Mongolian one was deemed "distorted" by North Koreans and sparked a diplomatic crisis in 1976, resulting in expulsion of the Mongolian ambassador to the country.

== Death and legacy ==
Cho died on 31 July 1951 in his office in Pyongyang during an American bombing raid in the war.

Mt. Paektu received the National Prize (국가훈장), first class, in 1948. Cho's works were awarded the Festival Prize (북조선예술축전상), the country's highest literary honor, modeled after the Stalin Prize. He also was awarded the Order of the National Flag, second class, for his work during the war in 1951, as well as a posthumous National Prize, first class, in 1952 for his cycle of poems Korea is Fighting (MR: Chosŏnŏn Ssaunda, 1951).

His resting place is at the Patriotic Martyrs' Cemetery, in Pyongyang. Today, Cho is regarded as the founding father of North Korean socialist realist poetry, or indeed poetry in general, or even North Korean literature as a whole. In the mid-1950s many Soviet Koreans, including Cho's close friends, were discredited in purges. According to Gabroussenko, Cho's untimely death in 1951 may have spared him his reputation from that loss of official recognition. With the exception of a period in the 1970s when Cho's name was barely mentioned in official publications, his legacy has benefited from continued popularity in North Korea.

== See also ==
- History of North Korea
- Korean poetry
- Koryo Ilbo
- Pak Se-yong

== Notes and references ==
=== Works cited ===
- Gabroussenko, Tatiana (2005). "Cho Ki-ch'ŏn: The Person Behind the Myths". Korean Studies. 29: 55–94. doi:10.1353/ks.2006.0005.
- Kim, Ellie Sue (2014). Rituals of Decolonization: The Role of Inner-Migrant Intellectuals in North Korea, 1948–1967 (PDF) (Ph.D.). University of California Los Angeles. OCLC 906762110.
- Wit, Jerôme de (2015). Writing Under Wartime Conditions: North and South Korean Writers During the Korean War (1950–1953) (PDF) (Doctorate). Leiden University. OCLC 900144488.
