= O Jin-u =

North Korean soldier and politician (1917–1995)

Wonsu O Jin-u
- 오진우

First Vice Chairmen of the National Defence Commission
- In office 1993 – February 25, 1995
- Leader: Kim Il Sung; Kim Jong Il
- Preceded by: Kim Jong Il
- Succeeded by: Jo Myong-rok

Vice Chairmen of the National Defence Commission
- In office 1972–1993
- Leader: Kim Il Sung; Kim Jong Il
- Succeeded by: Ri Yong-mu

Member of the Central Military Commission of the Workers' Party of Korea
- In office 1980 – February 25, 1995
- Leader: Kim Il Sung; Kim Jong Il

Minister of People's Armed Forces
- In office May 1976 – February 25, 1995
- Leader: Kim Il Sung; Kim Jong Il
- Preceded by: Choe Hyon
- Succeeded by: Choe Kwang

Chief of the General Staff of the Korean People's Army
- In office December 1968 – September 1979
- Leader: Kim Il-sung
- Preceded by: Choe Kwang
- Succeeded by: O Kuk-ryol

Director of the General Political Bureau of the Korean People's Army
- In office 1967–1968
- Leader: Kim Il Sung; Kim Jong Il
- In office 1979 – February 25, 1995
- Succeeded by: Jo Myong-rok

Commander of the Supreme Guard Command
- In office 1945–1946
- Leader: Kim Il Sung

Personal details
- Born: Kankyōnan-dō (South Hamgyong Province), South Korea, Empire of Japan
- Died: February 25, 1995 (aged 77) Pyongyang, North Korea
- Party: Workers' Party of Korea
- Children: O Il-hun; O Il-jong; O Il-su
- Awards: Hero of the Republic (twice); Order of Kim Il Sung (3 times); Order of the National Flag (18 times)

Military service
- Allegiance: North Korea
- Branch/service: Korean People's Army
- Years of service: 1933–1995
- Rank: Marshal of the Korean People's Army
- Commands: 766th Independent Infantry Regiment (North Korea); 43rd Division (North Korea); 3rd Division (North Korea); 1st Army Group
- Battles/wars: See battles: Korean independence movement; Battle of Pochonbo; World War II; Pacific War; Korean War; Operation Pokpoong; Battle of Pusan Perimeter; Battle of P'ohang-dong; Battle of Gangneung; Battle of Uljin-Pyeonghae; Battle of Yeongdeok-Ganggu; Battle of Hyeongsan River; Korean DMZ Conflict

Korean name
- Hangul: 오진우
- Hanja: 吳振宇
- RR: O Jinu
- MR: O Chinu

O Jin-u (Korean: 오진우; March 8, 1917 – February 25, 1995) was a North Korean general and politician. He was a close associate of Kim Il Sung. O served under Kim in the Northeast Anti-Japanese United Army, and then as commander of Kim's bodyguard. He was a founding officer of the Korean People's Army (KPA), fought in the Korean War, and was a Vice-Chairman of the National Defence Commission from 1972 until dying in 1995. He was considered to be the most powerful person in North Korea after Kim Il Sung and Kim Jong Il, a hardliner, and a strong supporter of North Korea's nuclear program.

== Career ==
O was born in Bukcheong, South Gyeongsang Province, to a poor peasant family. In 1933, joined anti-Japanese forces in Manchuria and began a long association with Kim Il Sung. They joined the Northeast Anti-Japanese United Army in 1938, returning to Korea in 1945 as part of the 88th Separate Rifle Brigade to found North Korea. O became the leader of the Pyongyang Police Station and Kim's bodyguard. In February 1948, he transferred to the new KPA.

O started the Korean War as commander of the 43rd Division. He led the 766th Independent Infantry Regiment during the Battle of the Pusan Perimeter. After the war he was rapidly promoted through the military and political hierarchy. He was appointed chief of staff of the Korean People's Air Force in 1958, vice-minister of the Ministry of People's Security in 1962, General in 1963, director of the KPA General Political Bureau in 1967 and Chief of the General Staff in 1968. In the Workers' Party of Korea, he joined the Central Committee in 1954, the Political Committee in 1966, the Secretariat in 1968 and the Presidium in 1977.

O Jin-u is held responsible for the Korean axe murder incident and Rangoon bombing as head of the KPA. He helped Kim Il Sung maintain control of the military. O initially supported Kim Pyong-il succession Kim Il Sung; Kim Jong Il did not have military experience and did not look like an orthodox communist to O. O's switch to support Kim Jong Il was likely the decisive factor in securing the latter's succession. According to top officials, O "proposed" as Kim Il Sung heir at a Central Committee plenum in 1974. and helped him take control of the military; O championed Kim Jong Il's cause, particularly within the military.

A deputy to the Supreme People's Assembly since 1960, O was appointed member of the top Central People's Committee immediately after its establishment in 1972, as well as vice-chairman of the National Defence Commission and Minister of the People's Armed Forces in 1976. He was also promoted to Vice Marshal in 1985 and Marshal in 1992, one of only three military officers in the North Korean Forces to be granted the rank.

After Kim Jong Il was made Chairman of the National Defence Commission in 1993, O replaced him as its first vice-chairman. In 1990, after the collapse of the socialist bloc, he led the emergency system. He also was the second-ranking member of the Kim Il-sung funeral committee in 1994, immediately beneath Kim Jong Il. He was also the last surviving WPK Presidium member along with the new leader.

According to the testimony of film director Shin Sang-ok, who was abducted from North Korea, "O Jin-u once said that if he was drunk, he would wipe out Busan in a week if the general commanded him. Lunch in Daejeon, dinner in Busan... "

In January 2017, it was reported that his three sons, Kim Jong-Su, O Il-jong and O Il-su had been "purged" by Kim Jong Un. No official reason was given for why they were purged; however, it is believed that Kim Jong Un viewed their relation to O as a possible threat to his rule of the DPRK. Considering how revered O was in the DPRK (still having the title of "Revolutionary Martyr"), the incident shocked observers, as respected officials' relatives tended to be well taken care of. However, in contradiction to this report, in 2021, O Il-jong was elected as a member of the Politburo of the Workers' Party of Korea.

== Illness and death ==
O Jin-u, who had been victorious in the North Korean regime, suffered a worsening case of lung cancer, and his frequency of public appearances decreased significantly during this time. He went to France to receive treatment under Kim Jong Il's special consideration, but he did not show any signs of recovery and finally died in February 1995 while fighting the disease in Pyongyang, a year after Kim Il Sung. Since O was a major supporter for Kim Jong Il's succession, which had not been fully realized at the time of his death, the event was seen as a setback for Kim. After O's death, Kim Jong Il left the minister's position vacant for more than seven months before naming a new minister, Choi Kwang. O Jin-u is deeply imprinted with a warlike appearance, and the first person that comes to mind when many people think of the North Korean People's Army is O Jin-u.

A funeral committee of 240 members was appointed for O. It included:

1. Kim Jong Il
2. Kang Song-san
3. Ri Jong-ok
4. Pak Song-chol
5. Kim Yong-ju
6. Kim Yong-nam
7. Choe Kwang
8. Kye Ung-thae
9. Chon Pyong-ho
10. Han Song-yong
11. Kim Jong-SuSo Yun-sok
12. Kim Chol-man
13. Choe Tae-pok
14. Choe Yong-nim
15. Hong Song-nam
16. Yang Hyong-sop
17. Hong Sok-hyong
18. Yon Hyon-muk

== Awards and honors ==
A frame with O's awards and honors was displayed during his funeral, showing all the decorations he had received.

Hero of the Republic, twice

Order of Kim Il Sung, three times

Order of the National Flag First Class, thirteen times

Order of Freedom and Independence First Class, seven times

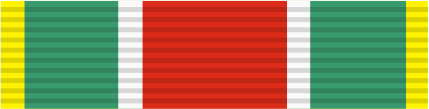
Order of Korean Labour, four times

Commemorative Order "Foundation of the Democratic People's Republic of Korea"

Commemorative Order "Anniversary of the Foundation of the People's Army"

Order of Military Service Honour First Class

Commemorative Order "30th Anniversary of the Agricultural Presentation"

Order of the National Flag Second Class, three times

Order of Freedom and Independence Second Class, twice

Order of the National Flag Third Class, twice

Commemorative Order "Capital Construction"

Commemorative Order "60th Anniversary of the People's Army"

Commemorative Order "40th Anniversary of Fatherland Liberation War Victory"

Commemorative Medal "Fatherland Liberation"

Commemorative Medal "The Foundation of the People's Republic of Korea", twice

Medal For Military Merit

Medal of Military Service Honour

== Works ==
- Kim Il; Choe Hyon; Pak Sung-chul; O Jin-u; et al. (1982). Twenty-year-long Anti-Japanese Revolution Under the Red Sunrays: September 1931 – February 1936. Vol. 2. Pyongyang: Foreign Languages Publishing House. OCLC 914716941.
- O Jin-u (1970). "Speech by Chief of General Staff Oh Jin Woo [Speeches at the Pyongyang mass rally 'in support of the Chinese people's struggle against U.S. imperialism and for the liberation of Taiwan' (June 27, 1970)]". People of Asia: Unite and Drive the U.S. Agressors Out of Asia!. Peking: Foreign Languages Press. pp. 95–114. OCLC 204899.
- — (1974). "Once All the People Are Armed, They Can Drive Back Any Enemy". Establishing the People's Revolutionary Government: A Genuine People's Power. Pyongyang: Foreign Languages Publishing House. OCLC 441622192.
- — (1975). "The Gun Report that Rumbled in North Manchuria". Victory at Laoheishan. Pyongyang: Foreign Languages Publishing House. pp. 13–22. OCLC 449795434.
- — (1977). "On an Expedition to North Manchuria". Taking a Machine Gun Himself. Pyongyang: Foreign Languages Publishing House. OCLC 6423895.

== Sources ==
- Martin, Bradly K. (2004). Under the Loving Care of the Fatherly Leader: A History of North Korea and the Kim Dynasty. New York: Thomas Dunne. pp. 61–62. ISBN 0-312-32221-6.

Political offices
Preceded by Choe Hyon	Minister of People's Armed Forces; 1976–1995	Succeeded by Choe Kwang
Preceded by Kim Jong Il	First Vice Chairman of the National Defence Commission; 1993–1995	Vacant Title next held by Jo Myong-rok
Preceded by	Vice Chairmen of the National Defence Commission; 1972–1993	Vacant Title next held by Ri Yong-mu
Preceded by	Member of the Central Military Commission of the Workers' Party of Korea; 1980–1995	Vacant
Preceded by	Vice Minister of the Ministry of Social Security (North Korea); 1962–	Succeeded by
Party political offices
Preceded by	Secretariat of the Workers' Party of Korea; 1981–1995	Succeeded by
Preceded by	Member of the Presidium of the Politburo of the Workers' Party of Korea; 14 October 1980–5 February 1995	Succeeded by
Preceded by	Member of the Politburo of the Workers' Party of Korea; 14 October 1980–5 February 1995	Succeeded by
Preceded by	Member of the Central Committee of the Workers' Party of Korea; 1981–1995	Succeeded by
Military offices
Preceded by	Director of the General Political Bureau of the Korean People's Army; 1967–1968	Succeeded by
Preceded by Choe Kwang	Chief of the General Staff of the Korean People's Army; 1968–1979	Succeeded by O Kuk-ryol
Preceded by O Kuk-ryol	Chief of the General Staff of the Korean People's Army; 1988–1995 (serving alongside Choe kwang)	Succeeded by Choe Kwang
Preceded by	Director of the General Political Bureau of the Korean People's Army; 1979–1995	Succeeded by Jo Myong-rok
Preceded by	Commander of the Korean People's Army Air and Anti-Air Force; 1958–	Succeeded by
