= Ministry of Finance (North Korea) =

Government ministry

- 재정성

Agency overview
- Formed: September 1948
- Jurisdiction: North Korea
- Headquarters: Pyongyang
- Agency executive: Ri Myong Guk, Minister
- Parent agency: Cabinet of North Korea

Korean name
- Hangul: 재정성
- Hanja: 財政省
- RR: Jaejeongseong
- MR: Chaejŏngsŏng

The Ministry of Finance (Korean: 재정성) is a government ministry in North Korea which is responsible for planning and managing the economic policies of the Democratic People's Republic of Korea. It deliberates the budget, establishes tax and economy policies, establishes fiscal policies and national financial management plans, organizes budgets, and discusses plans for fund management. It is a department in charge of coordination, budget and fund execution and management. It was formed in September 1948.

== Ministers of Finance ==
Name	Took office	Left office	Notes
Choe Chang-ik	9 September 1948	29 November 1952	
Yi Chu-yon	29 November 1952	23 March 1954	
Choe Chang-ik	23 March 1954	November 1954	
Yi Chu-yon	November 1954	April 1958	
Song Bong-uk	April 1958	August 1960	
Han Sang-tu	August 1960	16 December 1967	
Yun Ki-pok	16 December 1967	1969	
Choe Yong-su	1969	1971	
Kim Kyong-yon	July 1971	1980	
Yun Gi-jong	April 1980	1998	Yun Ki-chong, Yun Ki-jong
Rim Kyong-suk	1998	October 2000	Yim Kyong-suk
Mun Il-bong	October 2000	2008	
Kim Wan-su	April 2009	September 2009	
Pak Su-gil	2009	February 2012	
Choe Kwang-jin	February 2012	February 2015	
Ki Kwang-ho	February 2015	January 2021	
Ko Jong-bom	January 2021	July 2024	
Ri Myong Guk 리명국	July 2024		

== See also ==
- Cabinet of North Korea
- Central Bank of the Democratic People's Republic of Korea
- Economy of North Korea
