= Jon Hui-jong =

North Korean politician (1930–2020)

Korean name
- Hangul: 전희정
- Hanja: 全熙正
- RR: Jeon Huijeong
- MR: Chŏn Hŭijŏng

Jon Hui-jong (전희정, 5 March 1930 – 22 September 2020) was a North Korean politician and diplomat.

== Career ==
In 1968 he was temporarily the Chargé d'Affaires ad interim for the North Korean embassy in Cambodia. In 1972 he was the Chargé d'Affaires ad interim for Angola and Zaire. In 2001 he was the ambassador for North Korea in Egypt.

== Honours ==
He received the Order of Kim Jong Il in 2012.
