= Kim Tal-hyon =

North Korean politician (1941–2000)

Korean name
- Hangul: 김달현
- Hanja: 金達鉉
- RR: Gim Dalhyeon
- MR: Kim Tarhyŏn

Kim Tal-hyon (Korean: 김달현; 1941–2000) was a North Korean politician who was vice premier of the economy. As a technocrat, he is known for his work on the Tumen River project. The project was a limited experiment in free market reform, but was ultimately quashed by North Korean dictator Kim Jong Il.

In July 1992, Vice Premier Kim Tal-hyon, widely known as the North's highest economic policymaker and a "technocrat," made an extensive tour of industrial plants in South Korea with a view toward economic cooperation in the near future. He proposed pilot joint venture projects in the Nampo light industrial complex of North Korea.
