= Pak Su-gil =

North Korean politician (born 1948)

Pak Su-gil (Korean: 박수길; born April 8, 1948) is a politician from North Korea. He was the Vice Premier and Minister of Finance from 2009 to 2012. He was also a member of the Political Bureau of the Central Committee of the Workers' Party of Korea and a delegate to the 12th Supreme People's Assembly.

== Career ==
In March 1995, he was appointed as the Chairman of the Administrative and Economic Committee of Myeongcheon County, North Hamgyong Province, and in September 1997, he was appointed as the Chairman of the Administrative and Economic Committee of North Hamgyong Province. From September 1998 to September 2009, he served as Chairman of the People's Committee of North Hamgyong Province. In 2009 he was appointed Vice Premier and Minister of Finance in the Cabinet. In September 2010, he was elected as a member of the Central Committee of the Workers' Party of Korea.

== Representative of the Supreme People's Assembly ==
He served consecutively as a delegate to the 10th Supreme People's Assembly in September 1998 and as a delegate to the 11th Supreme People's Assembly in September 2003. At the Fifth Session of the 12th Supreme People's Assembly held in April 2012, he was dismissed as Vice Premier. He was replaced as Minister of Finance in February 2012 by Choe Kwang-jin.

== Honors ==
Distinguished Service Medal He received the Order of Kim Il Sung in April 2005.
