= Yun Gi-jong =

North Korean politician

Minister of Finance
- In office 1980–1998
- Preceded by: Kim Kyong-yon
- Succeeded by: Rim Kyong-suk

Personal details
- Citizenship: North Korean
- Party: Workers' Party of Korea
- Occupation: Politician

Yun Gi-jong was a North Korean politician. She served as Minister of Finance from 1980 to 1998, as well as Chairman of the Korea-Algeria Friendship Association, Korea-Mali Friendship Association, Korea-Mongolia Friendship Association, and the Korea-Syria Friendship Association. In 1987, Yun reported that the state's expenditure in the previous year totaled $24.8 Billon, with revenue of $24.9 billion, for a surplus of $124.5 million. In 1994 she reported expenditures and income of ₩41.5 billion ($20 billion). At the fourth UN World Conference on Women, held in Beijing, Yun delivered a speech, which included a section on comfort women and the issue of "consolation money". She was succeeded by Rim Kyong-suk in 1999. Yun's current status is unknown.
