= Yon Hyong-muk =

7th Premier of North Korea from 1988 to 1992

- 연형묵

7th Premier of North Korea
- In office 11 December 1988 – 11 December 1992
- Leader: Kim Il Sung
- Preceded by: Ri Kun-mo
- Succeeded by: Kang Song-san

Personal details
- Born: 3 November 1931 Kyongwon County, Kankyōhoku-dō, Korea, Empire of Japan
- Died: 22 October 2005 (aged 73) Pyongyang, North Korea

Korean name
- Hangul: 연형묵
- Hanja: 延亨默
- RR: Yeon Hyeongmuk
- MR: Yŏn Hyŏngmuk

Yon Hyong-muk (Korean: 연형묵; 3 November 1931 – 22 October 2005), also spelt Yong Hyong-muk, was a long-serving politician in North Korea and at the height of his career the most powerful person in that country outside the Kim family. He was Prime Minister of North Korea from 1988 to 1992.

He was born in Kyongwon County, Kankyōhoku-dō, Korea, Empire of Japan (now in North Hamgyong Province, North Korea) and had a strong revolutionary background in his family. He was educated locally and employed as a farm worker. Yon was educated in Czechoslovakia and by the 1950s, he was firmly established within the hierarchy of the Workers' Party of Korea. In 1967, he was selected as a deputy to the Supreme People's Assembly.

During the 1970s, Yon further advanced in the Party and by the middle 1980s he was regarded as the fourth most powerful person in North Korea after Kim Il Sung, Kim Jong Il, and veteran marshal and defence minister O Jin-u. He was a candidate member of the Politburo from the early 1980s and became Prime Minister of North Korea in 1989. During this era, Yon served as Minister of Heavy Industry and this consolidated his role in the North's large armaments sector.

In this period, as Kim Il Sung and O Jin-u were both already past eighty, Yon took an important role in relations between North and South Korea. He worked hard in this field as Prime Minister and was regarded as the chief negotiator behind the Agreement on Reconciliation, Non-aggression and Exchanges and Cooperation between the South and the North (also known as the "South-North Basic Agreement") of 1991. At the time he called it "the most valuable achievement ever made between the South and North Korean authorities." For the rest of the 1990s, Yon was the chief figure behind efforts to reconcile the two Koreas.

By the 2000s, Yon was declining in health and his role in North Korean politics had become largely ceremonial by the time he died - presumably of pancreatic cancer for which he had received treatment in Russia in 2004 at the well protected Central Clinical Hospital.

Yon was a recipient of the Order of Kim Il Sung, Hero of Labor and other awards.

== Death and funeral ==
Yon died on 22 October 2005. A funeral committee chaired by Jo Myong-rok was appointed.

== Works ==
- Yon Hyong-muk (October 1985). "The Great Guiding Force Leading Socialist Economic Construction to Brilliant Victory" (PDF). Kulloja. OCLC 9516938.
- — (February 1987). "Leadership of the Party Is a Basic Factor for Winning Victory in Socialist Economic Construction" (PDF). Kulloja. OCLC 9516938.
- — (July 1988). "Revolutionary Optimism Is the Traditional Revolutionary Spirit of Our People, Who Victoriously Pushed Their Way Through the Arduous and Rigorous Road of Revolution" (PDF). Kulloja. OCLC 9516938. Archived (PDF) from the original on February 26, 2017.
