= Battle of Pochonbo =

1937 battle in northern Korea

- Part of the Korean Independence Movement
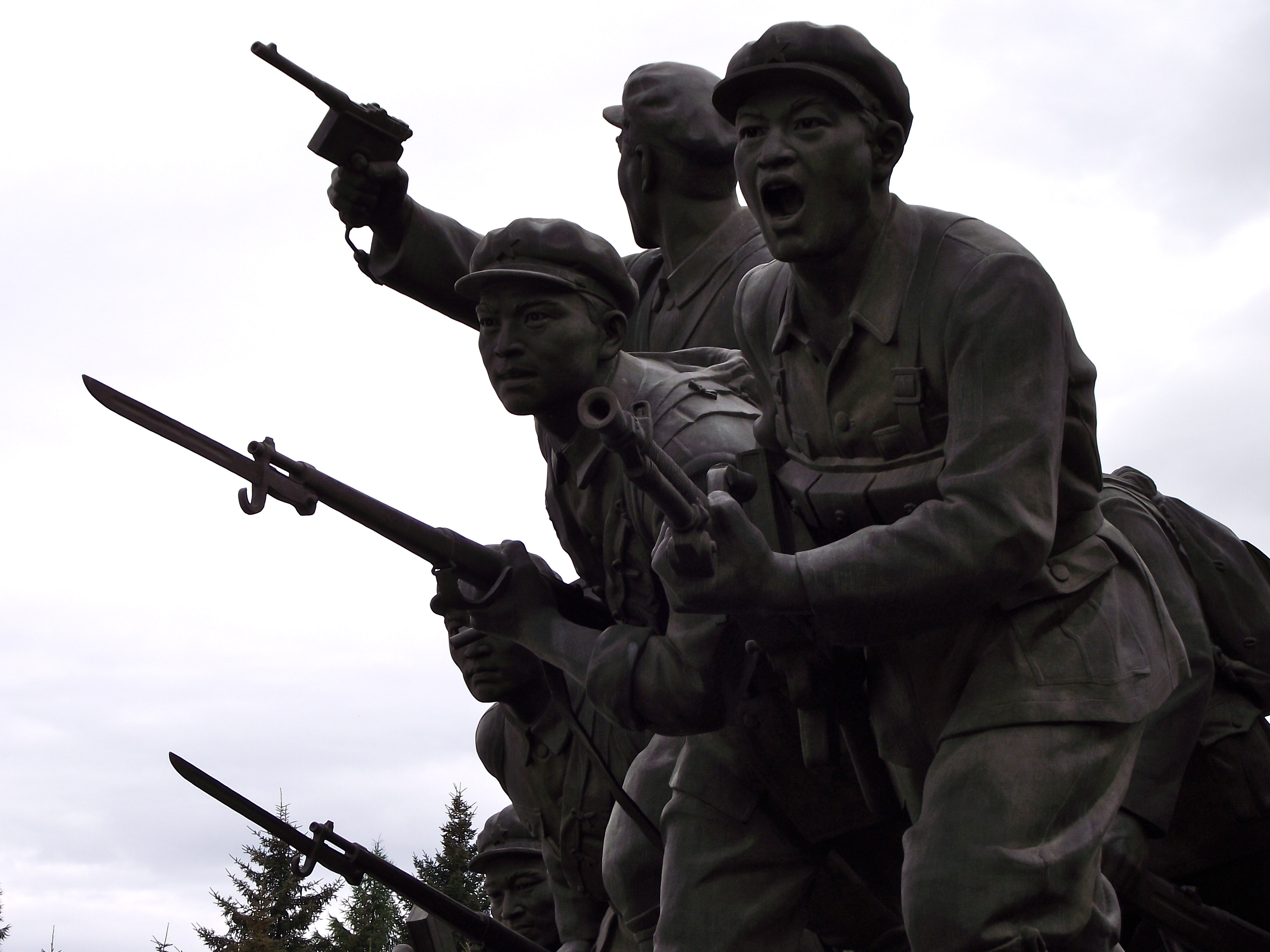
- The battle depicted in the Grand Monument in Samjiyon, Samjiyon County
Date	4 June 1937
Location	Pojŏn (Hōden) village, Pochon (Futen) district, Kapsan (Kōzan) county, Kankyōnan-dō province, Korea, Empire of Japan 41°31′30″N 128°17′58″E
Result	Anti-Japanese United Army victory

Belligerents
Northeast Anti-Japanese United Army	Japan

Commanders and leaders
Kim Il Sung; Choe Hyon	Unknown

Units involved
Sixth Division of the Second Army of the First Route Army	Unknown

Strength
80 (Japanese claim); 150 (Korean claim); 150–200	33

Casualties and losses
20 killed	9 killed
- Location within North Korea

Battle of Pochonbo (Korean: 보천보 전투; Hanja: 普天堡 戰鬪; RR: Bocheonbo Seubgyeog; Japanese: 普天堡の戦い, romanized: Futenho no Tatakai) was an event which occurred in northern Korea, Empire of Japan on 4 June 1937, when Korean and Chinese guerrillas commanded by Kim Il Sung (or possibly Choe Hyon) attacked and defeated a Japanese detachment during the anti-Japanese armed struggle in Korea. The battle holds an important place in North Korea.

== Battle ==
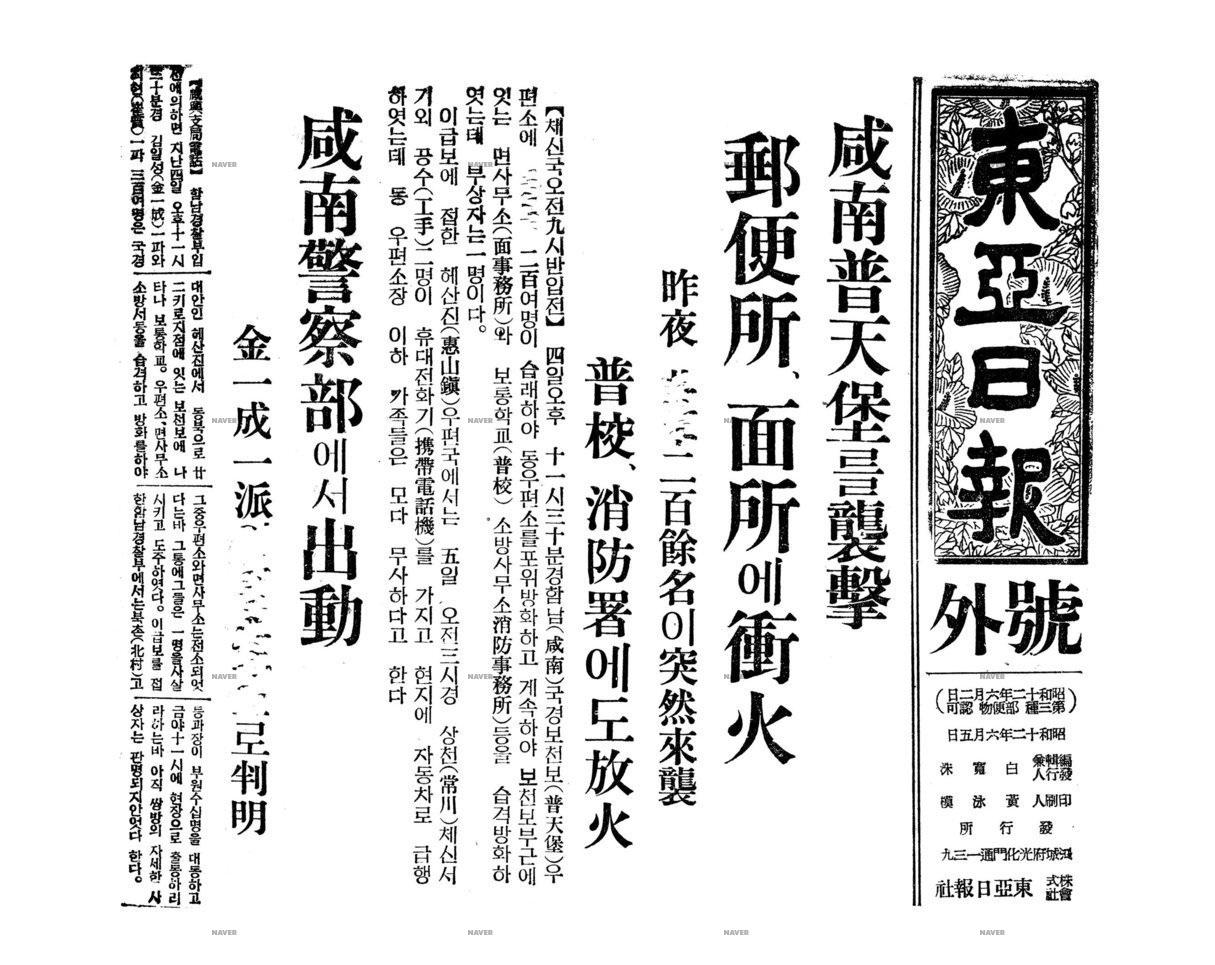
Report of the battle in The Dong-a Ilbo. The battle was reported in numerous newspapers across the world.

Kim Il Sung was in command of 80 men according to the Japanese and 150 according to the Koreans. According to the official North Korean version of the events, a small unit of about 150–200 guerrillas of the Northeast Anti-Japanese United Army's Sixth Division under Kim Il Sung crossed the Amnok River and arrived at the Konjang Hill on 3 June 1937. At 22:00, Kim Il Sung fired a shot into the sky, and the battle started. During the battle, the Japanese-occupied police station, post office, foresters' office, local elementary school, fire department hall were destroyed by the guerrillas. Kim took 4,000 yen from local people and inflicted damage estimated at 16,000 yen. He took the town but only occupied it for a few hours or a day before retreating to Manchuria.

North Korean state historiography claims that following combat, Kim Il Sung made a speech, where he noted that the Korean people "turn out as one in the sacred anti-Japanese war". In fact, no speech was made; the speech first appeared in North Korean publications in 1977, forty years after the raid.

The battle is featured in Kim Il Sung's autobiography With the Century. In it, too, Kim describes his guerrilla troops acting spontaneously and motivated by emotion rather than reason and strategic insights.

This official version of the battle does not correspond with some contemporary records such as a Japanese newspaper, however, which suggest that the rebels were actually led by Choe Hyon. But Kim Il Sung's absence from Japanese reports does not necessarily refute his presence in the battle, nor does the Choe Hyon's mention necessarily mean he was the top commander of the battle, as it only means Choe Hyon was the only commander on the Korean side whom the Japanese were able to identify.

== Aftermath and legacy ==
The news of the battle was reported in numerous newspapers across the world, including the Soviet Union, China, Japan and France.

The event brought Kim some fame among both his comrades as well as the Japanese. As a result, his influence grew, though the Japanese Imperial Army also started to hunt him, and almost wiped out his force. He was eventually forced retreat into the Soviet Union in 1940. Northern Korea was officially liberated from Japan on V-J Day (15 August 1945). Kim subsequently returned to his home country, and when he managed to establish himself with Soviet help as head of People's Committee of North Korea and Party's north faction (predecessors of future North Korea and WPK, respectively), his reputation as hero of Pochonbo helped him to gain acceptance and support among the people.

Kim Il-sung's legitimacy came from propaganda that he fought against Japan, symbolised by the Battle of Pochonbo ... Schools in North Korea teach children that the battle was a glorious victory against Japan led by Kim Il-sung.

— Ken Kato, a researcher and human rights activist

Since then, the North Korean government has continuously reinforced the importance of the Battle of Pochonbo and Kim Il Sung's role in it. As result, it was speculated that Kim Jong Un, Kim Il Sung's grandson, had purged Choe Hyon's son Choe Ryong-hae in 2014 to prevent the undermining of the official version of the battle. It later became clear, however, that Choe Ryong-hae had not been purged at all and remained an influential member of the North Korean government.

The battle first entered the history textbook of South Korea in 2003, account Kim Il Sung's efforts on Anti-Japanese in relatively circumspect narratives. Controversies were raised on whether it makes students idolize North Korean regimes, or it could become a sign of South Korean history education stepping out from the cold-war thinking.

The Pochonbo Electronic Ensemble takes its name from the battle.

=== Battle site ===
The battle site is situated at Pochon County, Ryanggang Province at the Kusi Barrage on Kojang Hill.

==== Monument ====
Samjiyon Grand Monument complex (area 100,000 m^{2}) was completed in 1979 and includes a 15m-high statue of a Kim Il-sung, a huge square for rallies and many sculptures. This place was chosen as it is said to be where the guerrillas rested before the raid.

Samjiyon Grand Monument complex

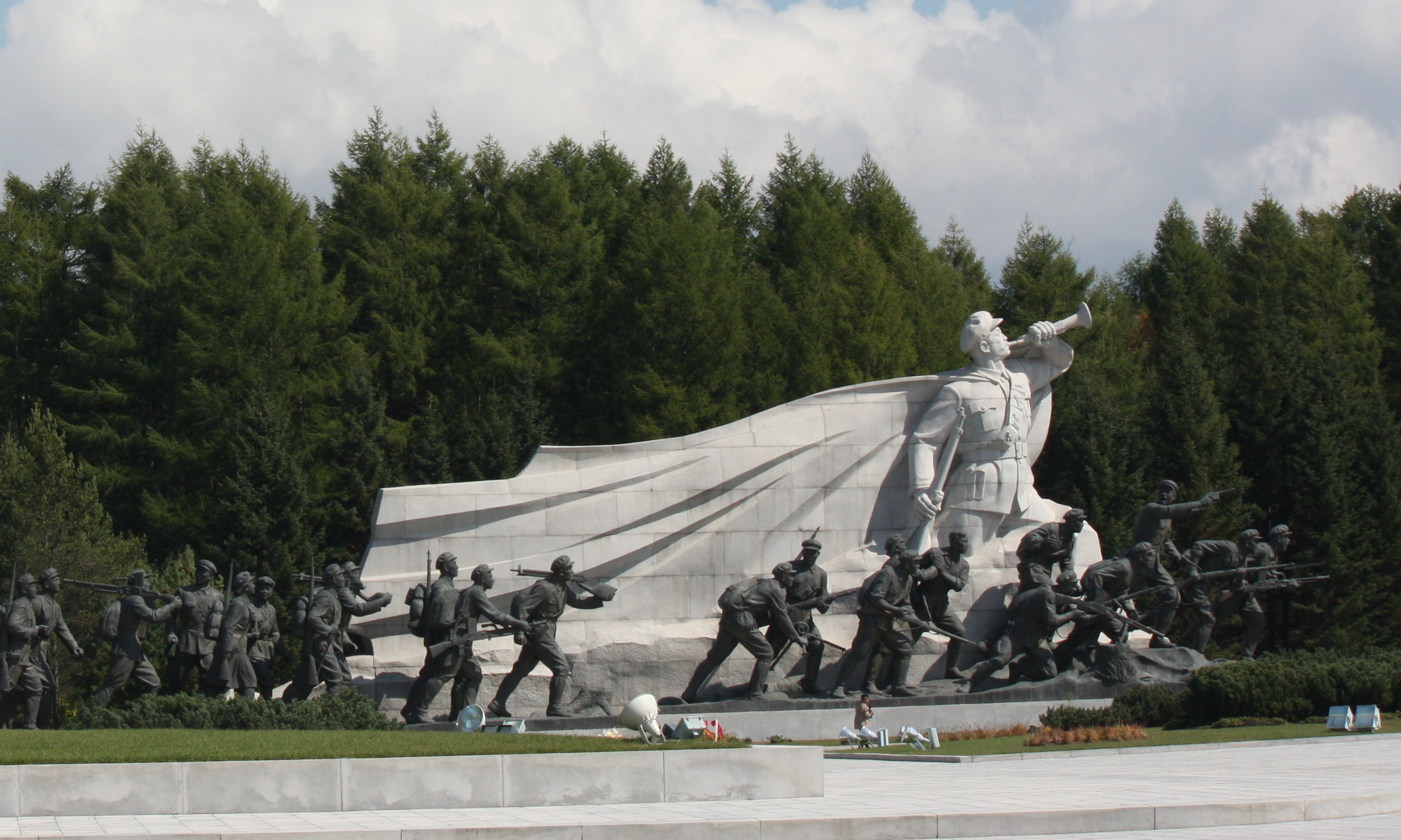

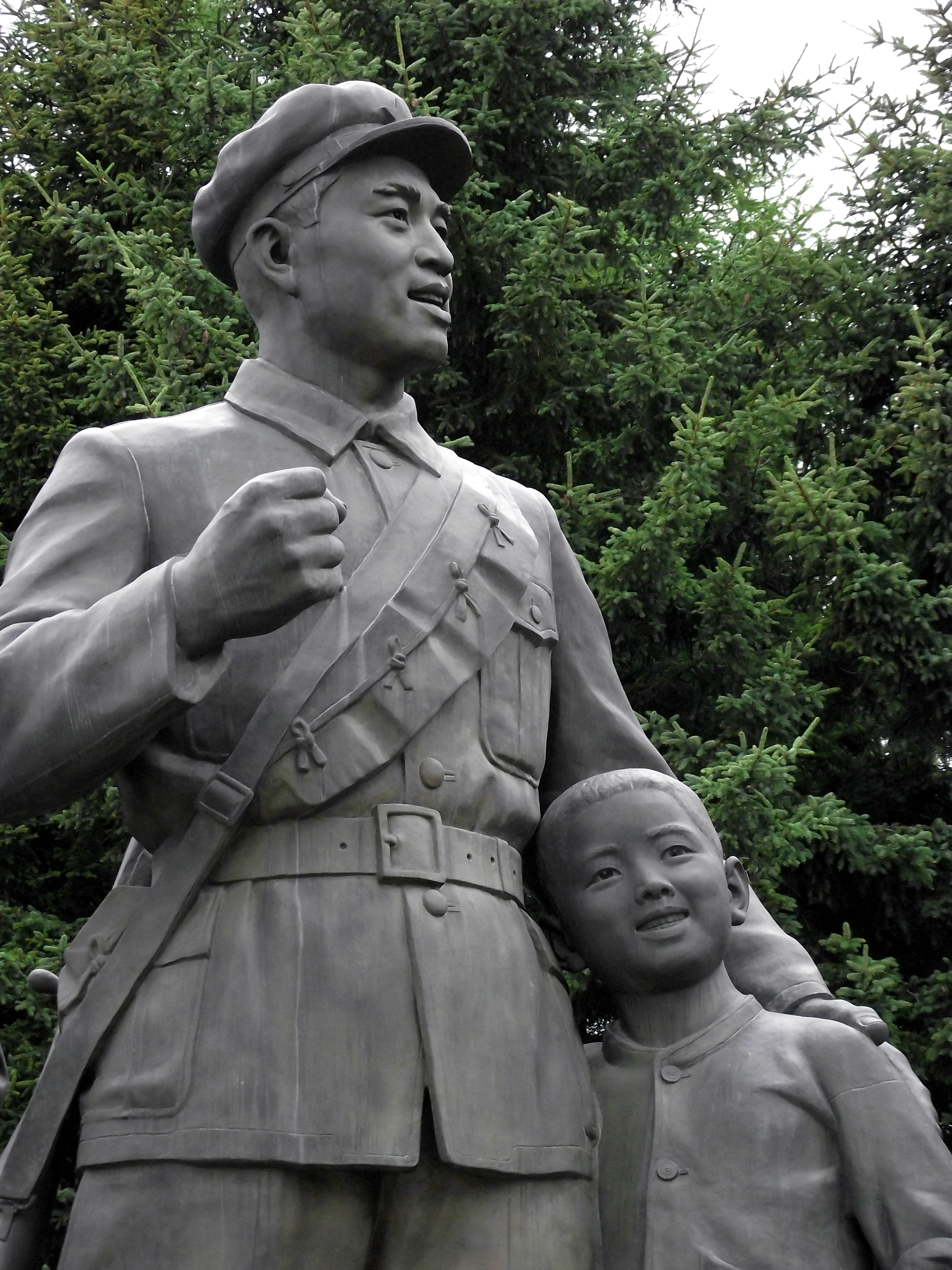

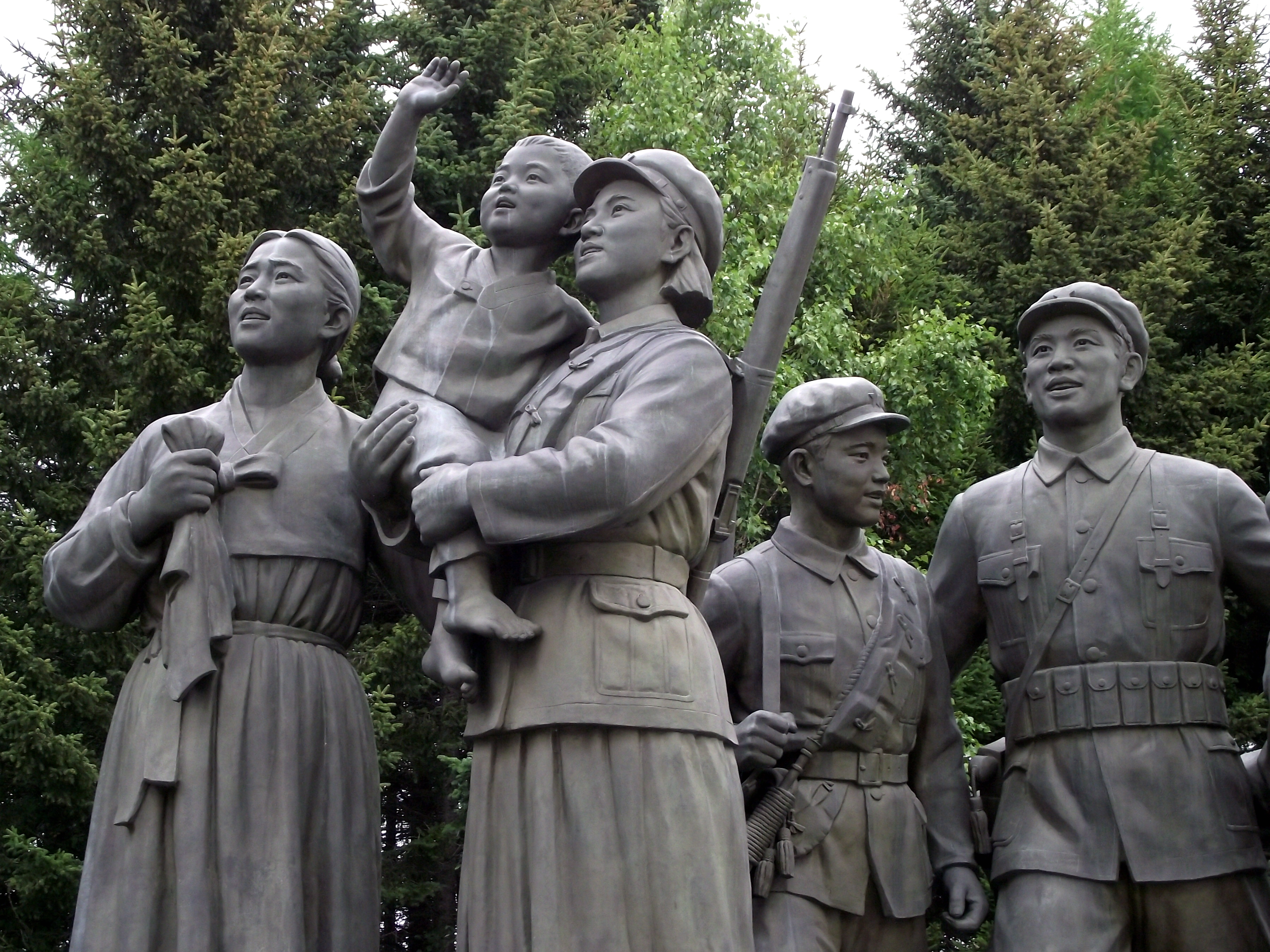

== See also ==
- Korean independence movement
- Mt. Paektu (poem)
- Pochonbo Electronic Ensemble
- Pochonbo Torch Prize
