= Kang Song-san =

Premier of North Korea (1931–2007)

- 강성산

5th Premier of North Korea
- In office 11 December 1992 – 21 February 1997
- Leader: Kim Il Sung; Kim Jong Il
- Preceded by: Yon Hyong-muk
- Succeeded by: Hong Song-nam
- In office 27 January 1984 – 29 December 1986
- Leader: Kim Il Sung
- Preceded by: Ri Jong-ok
- Succeeded by: Ri Kun-mo

Personal details
- Born: 3 March 1931 Kyongwon County, Kankyōhoku Province, Korea, Empire of Japan
- Died: 25 June 2000 (aged 69) Jilin City, China

Korean name
- Hangul: 강성산
- Hanja: 姜成山
- RR: Gang Seongsan
- MR: Kang Sŏngsan

Kang Song-san (3 March 1931 – 25 June 2000) was a North Korean politician who served as Premier of North Korea from 1984 to 1986 and again from 1992 to 1997. He succeeded Ri Jong-ok in his first term and Yon Hyong-muk in his second term.

== Biography ==
He was born in North Hamgyong Province. He graduated from Mangyongdae Revolutionary School and from Kim Il Sung University and went to study in the Soviet Union in Moscow State University. He became an instructor in the Central Committee of the Workers' Party of Korea in 1955. Candidate member of the political politburo in 1973, Vice Premier in 1977, the Sixth Party Congress in 1980 he was elected a member of the Politburo. In 1984, he became the Prime Minister of North Korea.

1991 Chairman of the People's president and secretary hambuk faction, the People's Committee of the Party Central Committee, member of the Political Bureau of the Korean Workers' Party, the Supreme People's Assembly to the delegates in charge of such positions. He was awarded Order of Kim Il Sung in 1982. Kang died on 25 June 2000 at 69.
