= Han Song-ryong =

North Korean politician (1923–2009)

Han Song-ryong 한성룡

Personal details
- Born: 1923 Myongchon County, Kankyōhoku-dō (North Hamgyong Province), Korea, Empire of Japan
- Died: 2 February 2009 (aged 85–86) North Korea
- Citizenship: North Korean
- Education: Red Flag Mangyongdae Revolutionary School
- Alma mater: Czech Technical University in Prague
- Occupation: Politician, government official

Han Song-ryong (Korean: 한성룡, 1923 – 2 February 2009) was a North Korean politician. He served in various positions in the Workers' Party of Korea and the North Korean Cabinet.

== Biography ==
Han was born in Myongchon County, North Hamgyong Province in 1923. He was educated at the Red Flag Mangyongdae Revolutionary School and Czech Technical University in Prague.

In May 1971 he was appointed to head the Second Machine Industry Ministry. In December 1972 he became Head of the Department of Ship Machinery Industry and became a member of the Supreme People's Assembly. In October 1980 he candidate member of the Central Committee of the Workers' Party of Korea. In 1981 chairman, Administrative Economic Guidance Committee, Jagang Province. In 1982 he was once again elected as member of the Supreme People's Assembly and once again in the 1986 election. At the same year he became full member of the WPK Central Committee. In 1988 he became member of the Second Economic Committee. In November 1988 he became candidate member of the Political Bureau. In December that year he became secretary of the Secretariat of the Workers' Party of Korea. In May 1990 he became member of the Central People's Committee and full member of the Politburo. In January 1992 he was appointed Head of the Heavy Industry Department of the WPK. In December 1993 he was dismissed from the Central People's Committee and appointed as chairman of the Budget Review Committee of the Supreme People's Assembly. In March 1994 he was appointed Head of the Economic Policy Inspection Department of the Central Committee of the Korean Workers' Party. In July 1994, following the sudden death of Kim Il Sung, he became a member of his funeral committee. He was elected to the 10th convocation of the Supreme People's Assembly and appointed to its budget committee. In 1987 he was awarded Order of Kim Il Sung.
