= Hong Sok-hyong =

North Korean politician

Secretary of the North Hamgyong Province WPK Committee
- In office 2001–2010
- Supreme Leader: Kim Jong Il
- Succeeded by: O Su-yong

Personal details
- Born: October 1, 1936 (age 90) Keijō, Korea, Empire of Japan
- Citizenship: North Korean
- Party: Workers' Party of Korea

Hong Sok-hyong (Korean: 홍석형) is a politician of the Democratic People's Republic of Korea. He was secretary of the WPK Central Committee and Director of the WPK Planning and Finance Department.

== Biography ==
Born in Seoul in 1936 during the Japanese occupation. After graduating from college, he received a degree in metallurgy. He was Vice President of Seongjin Steelworks Technology, 1st Vice of the Metal Industry Department, Kim Chaek Iron and Steel Complex., 2nd Secretary of the North Hamgyong Province, and Kim Chaek Iron and Steel Complex (2001–2010), served as the head of the Party Central Committee. And since September 2010, he has been secretary of the WPK Central Committee and director of the WPK Planning and Finance Department.

He was elected a member of the 6th Political Bureau of the Central Committee at the meeting of the Workers' Party of Korea in September 2010. However, in June 2011, it was reported that he was released from all positions, including the secretary-general of the North Korean Workers' Party.
