= Ri Kun-mo =

North Korean politician (1926–2001)

- 이근모

6th Premier of North Korea
- In office 29 December 1986 – 12 December 1988
- Leader: Kim Il Sung
- Preceded by: Kang Song-san
- Succeeded by: Yon Hyong-muk

Personal details
- Born: 5 April 1926 Heian'nan-dō (South Pyongan Province), Korea, Empire of Japan
- Died: 2001 (aged 74–75)

Korean name
- Hangul: 리근모
- Hanja: 李根模
- RR: Ri Geunmo
- MR: Ri Kŭnmo

Ri Kun-mo, also translated as Ri Gun-mo (5 April 1926 – 2001) was a North Korean politician. He was Prime Minister from 29 December 1986 to 12 December 1988, when he was replaced, reportedly due to poor health. He succeeded Kang Song-san. His successor was Yon Hyong-muk.

In 1998 he was nominated Chief Secretary for North Hamgyong Province, but he was removed in 2001 and presumably died shortly thereafter.

== See also ==
- Politics of North Korea
