= Choe Hyon =

North Korean general and politician (1907–1982)

- 최현
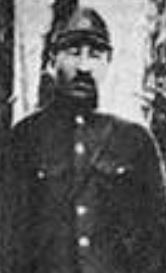
- Choe Hyon in 1945

Vice Chairman of the National Defense Commission
- In office 28 December 1972 – 10 April 1982 Serving with O Jin-u and O Paek-ryong
- Chairman: Kim Il Sung

Member of the Central Military Commission of the Workers' Party of Korea
- In office 1970s–1980
- Leader: Kim Il Sung

Minister of People's Armed Forces
- In office 25 December 1972 – 15 December 1977
- Premier: Pak Song-chol; Kim Il
- Preceded by: Kim Chang-bong
- Succeeded by: O Jin-u

Personal details
- Born: 6 May 1907 Hunchun, Jilin, China
- Died: 9 April 1982 (aged 74) Pyongyang, North Korea
- Party: Workers' Party of Korea
- Other political affiliations: Chinese Communist Party (before 1945)
- Children: Choe Ryong-hae; Choe Gop-dan

Military service
- Allegiance: Korean People's Army
- Years of service: 1946–1982
- Rank: General
- Commands: II Corps; 1st Infantry Division
- Battles/wars: See battles Korean independence movement: Pacification of Manchukuo; Battle of Pochonbo; Battle of Musan; Battle of Gansanbong; Chinese Civil War World War II: Pacific War; Korean War: Battle of Ongjin; Battle of Pusan Perimeter; First and Second Battles of Wonju; Battle of Hill 1,211

Korean name
- Hangul: 최현
- Hanja: 崔賢
- RR: Choe Hyeon
- MR: Ch'oe Hyŏn

Choe Hyon (Korean: 최현, 6 May 1907 – 10 April 1982), also known as Sai Ken (after the Japanese pronunciation of his name), was a North Korean general and politician.

Born in China to ethnic Korean parents, Choe fought in the anti-Japanese struggle from a young age. He became one of the most important military leaders of the armed resistance in Manchuria. He led troops in the Battle of Pochonbo. This was later attributed to Kim Il Sung in North Korean propaganda. The two were, however, close friends during and after the guerrilla years. After the liberation of Korea, the guerrillas chose Kim among themselves to be the leader of North Korea, even though Choe was his senior and had a higher rank in the Chinese Communist Party (CCP).

In North Korea, Choe assumed command of the highly strategic Kanggye Regiment of the 1st Division in the newly organized Korean People's Army (KPA). During the Korean War, he commanded the KPA II Corps. After the war, Choe was given posts in the politics of North Korea, including the office of Minister of People's Armed Forces, which he held from 1968 until 1976. During this time, several ex-guerrillas were purged, but Choe maintained his position thanks to his personal relationship with Kim Il Sung.

== Early life ==
Original photo of Choe Hyon (center) with Kim Il Sung (left). North Korea later edited it placing Kim in the center to emphasize his role.

Choe Hyon was born on 6 May 1907 in Hunchun, Jilin, China. Choe's father was Choe Hwa-shim. Hwa-shim had served in the Hong Beom-do Unit of the Korean Independence Army in the early 1900s. His mother reportedly died in 1920 after the Japanese invaded Manchuria to suppress the March 1st Movement. As such, Choe Hyon had an advantageous revolutionary background.

The Japanese arrested Choe in 1925 and put him in jail in Yanji for seven years. Upon his release, Choe joined the anti-Japanese guerrilla movement in July 1932 after Japanese conquered Manchuria. Thereafter, Choe fought as a guerrilla in the anti-Japanese struggle. He rose to a leadership position in the Northeast Anti-Japanese United Army of the Chinese, and became a member of the Chinese Communist Party (CCP). Choe also fought in the Soviet 88th Brigade after the United Army retreated to the Soviet Union.

The Battle of Pochonbo in 1937 is highly important in the North Korean cult of personality of Kim Il Sung as its victory is attributed to him. Some evidence, however, point to the conclusion that it was Choe Hyon, not Kim Il Sung, who commanded the troops that raided Pochonbo. Choe reportedly also led troops into battle in Musan and Gansanbong.

The army led by Choe was one of the main targets of the Japanese during a phase of the Pacification of Manchukuo that began in 1939. Dennis Halpin concludes in The National Interest that "Choe Hyon may well have been the key leader in the anti-Japanese colonial struggle in Manchuria and along the Korean border". According to Halpin, this discredits the revolutionary legitimacy of the Kim dynasty and lends it to Choe Hyon's son, Choe Ryong-hae, instead. North Korea has subsequently edited photographs from this era to emphasize Kim's role.

Choe Hyon was a close associate of Kim Il Sung during their guerrilla years. Choe was older than Kim Il Sung. As such, Choe did not have to use honorifics when speaking to him, although according to Kim Il Sung's autobiography With the Century, this was at Kim's insistence.

== Career after the liberation of Korea ==
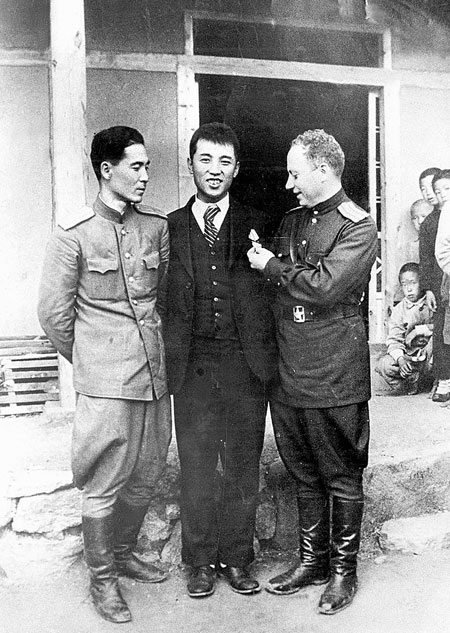
The Soviets grooming Kim Il Sung for leadership of Korea. At one time, Choe seemed like the likelier candidate.

After the liberation of Korea, Choe was brought into the politics of North Korea as part of the Guerrilla faction, a group of about 200 ex-guerillas. There is evidence that the top guerrillas, including Kim Il Sung, Kim Chaek, Kim Il, Choe Yong-gon, and Choe Hyon himself, agreed among themselves to promote Kim Il Sung as the leader of the future country just before they returned to Korea in September 1945. This was at odds with the fact that both Kim Chaek and Choe Hyon were higher-ranking members in the CCP. It was decided, however, that Kim Il Sung had the best reputation and abilities. Choe consequentially missed out on the supreme leadership of the country, but became part of its core elite nonetheless.

After the liberation, the Korean People's Army (KPA) was organized. Choe become the commander of the Kanggye Regiment of the 1st Division. The regiment was of particular strategic importance because of its location in Kanggye. Choe also led the Military Liberation College that trained special forces. Additionally, Choe commanded the 2nd Division of the KPA and, during the Korean War, the II Corps.

=== After the Korean War ===
After the Korean War, Choe became a member of the 3rd Central Committee of the Workers' Party of Korea (WPK) in 1956. Choe rose in the ranks of the party in the late 1960s at a "spectacular" rate. He had been chairman of the party's Military Affairs Commission since 1965, but lacked a seat in the Political Committee, to which he was then appointed in October 1966 as a full member, skipping the usual stage of being an alternate member first. In the late 1960s–early 1970s, Choe was one of the most powerful individuals in North Korean politics and military. As a member of the Central Military Commission of the WPK, Choe was one of "the seven most powerful men in North Korea". With his post as the Minister of People's Armed Forces, Choe was "probably the most powerful individual in the military area other than Kim Il-sŏng himself". By this time, Choe was Kim's best personal friend and renowned for his guerrilla past. Choe lived in high-end neighborhood of Changkwang-dong, near Kim Il Sung's mansion.

Choe became Minister of People's Armed Forces in late 1968, succeeding Choe Kwang, after serving as the vice minister first. Choe served as the minister until 1976, when O Jin-u replaced him "for health reasons". Choe was made minister not for his education – he was "nearly illiterate" – but for his loyalty. Although some members of the Guerrilla faction were purged in the 1960s, Choe maintained his position power. He became a member in the Politburo of the WPK at the 5th Congress of the WPK in 1970 and retained this position after the 6th Congress in 1980. During this time in particular, Choe had considerable power in the army. He remained at the top of the military until the end of his career. Choe had a talent for unconventional warfare in particular.

== Death and legacy ==
Choe published an autobiography, Over the Mountain-Waves of Mt. Paektu. Robert A. Scalapino and Chong-Sik Lee critically assess it as follows: "Though very revealing, some sections, particularly on his first encounters with Kim Il-sŏng, are so propagandistic as to be largely unreliable". Choe's first encounter with Kim are also recounted in Choe's memoir "The Unforgettable First Meeting" in Reminiscences of the Anti-Japanese Guerillas, and in Kim Il Sung's autobiography, With the Century. A meeting with Choe inspired the poet Cho Ki-chon to write his epic poem, Mt. Paektu, in 1947 about the Battle of Pochonbo. The resulting poem was a foundational work of Kim Il Sung's cult of personality. Choe's life is also chronicled in the 55th installment of the multi-part film Nation and Destiny.

Choe died on 10 April 1982. The 30th anniversary of his death in 2012 was marked prominently in North Korea. A memorial service was held, wreaths were laid at the Revolutionary Martyrs' Cemetery, and the Korean Central News Agency published an article praising him. This came at a time when his son Choe Ryong-hae rose up in the ranks of the WPK and was heavily featured at the 4th Conference of the WPK and an annual meeting of the Supreme People's Assembly.

Choe held the title of Hero of the Republic. Choe's son is Choe Ryong-hae (born 1950). He also had a daughter, Gop-dan.

The Choe Hyon-class destroyer ship class is named after him.

== In popular culture ==
Choe is portrayed by Im Hyun-sik in the 1981–1982 MBC TV series 1st Republic.

== Works ==
- Choe Hyon (1970). "The Unforgettable First Meeting". Reminiscences of the Anti-Japanese Guerillas. Pyongyang: Foreign Languages Publishing House. OCLC 869368184.
- Kim Il; Choe Hyon; et al. (1981). Twenty-year-long Anti-Japanese Revolution Under the Red Sunrays: June 1926 – August 1931. Vol. 1. Pyongyang: Foreign Languages Publishing House. OCLC 873742698.
- —; —; et al. (1982). Twenty-year-long Anti-Japanese Revolution Under the Red Sunrays: September 1931 – February 1936. Vol. 2. Pyongyang: Foreign Languages Publishing House. OCLC 914716941.
- Sai Ken [Choe Hyon] (1964). 白頭の山なみを越えて [Over the Mountain-Waves of Mt. Paektu] (in Japanese). Tokyo: Chōsen Seinensha. OCLC 674619272.

Political offices
Preceded by Kim Chang-bong	Minister of People's Armed Forces; 1968–1976	Succeeded by O Jin-u
Preceded by	Vice Minister of People's Armed Forces –1968	Succeeded by
Preceded by	Chairmen of the Military Affairs Commission; December 1960s–	Succeeded by
Preceded by	Member of the Politburo of the Workers' Party of Korea; 31 December 1970–1980	Succeeded by
