= Kankyōhoku Province =

1910–1945 province of Korea under Japan

Kankyōhoku-dō 咸鏡北道
- Former province of Korea, Empire of Japan
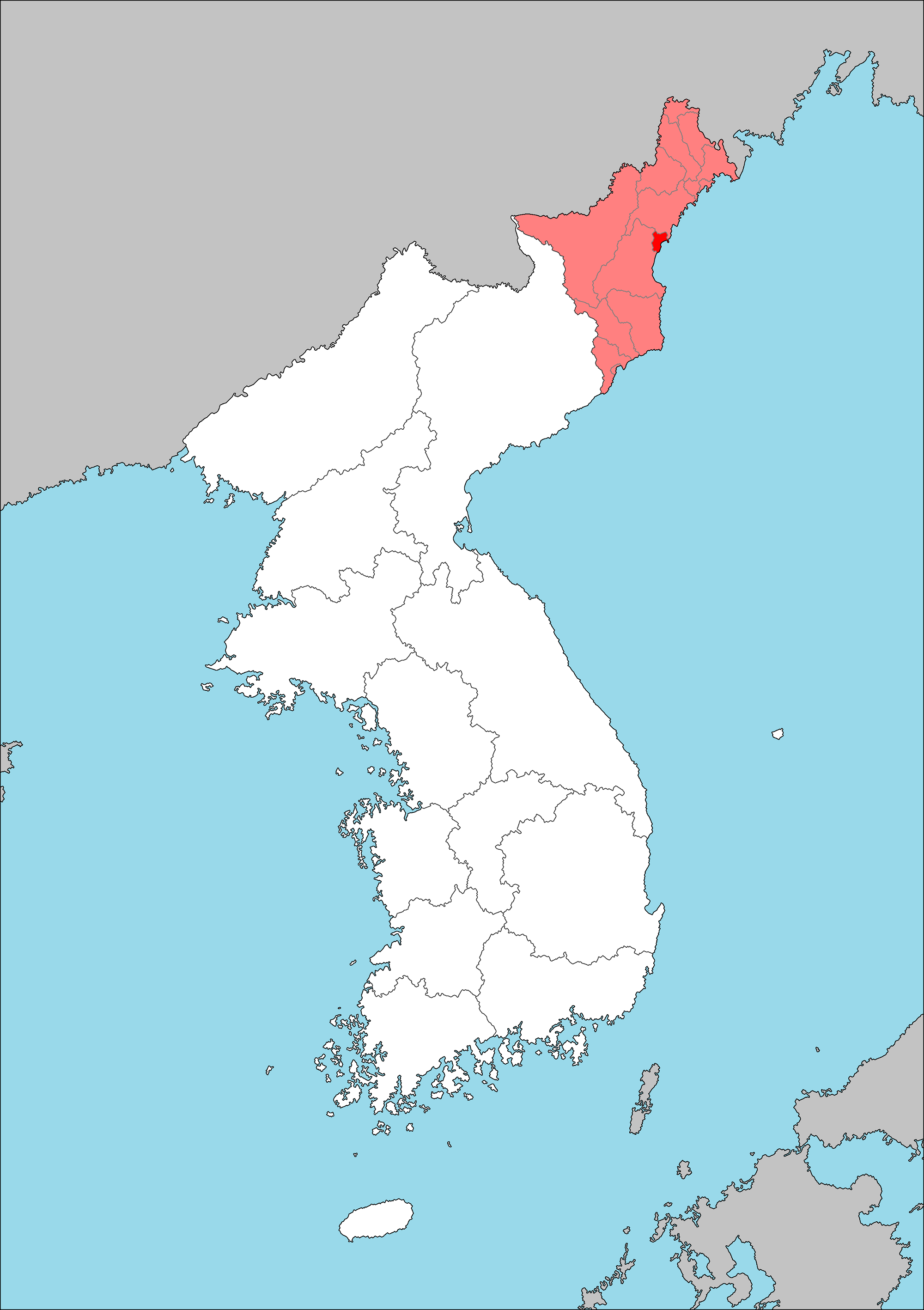
- Capital: Seishin
- Population
  - 1936: 813,893
Preceded by	Succeeded by
North Hamgyong Province	Soviet Civil Administration
- Today part of: North Korea

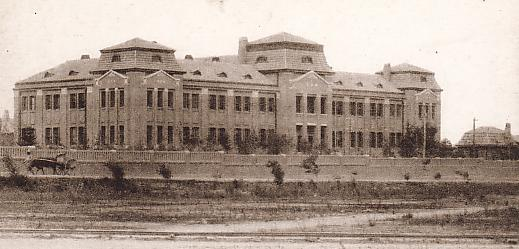
Kankyō-hoku Provincial Office

Kankyōhoku-dō (咸鏡北道; Korean: 함경북도), alternatively Kankyōhoku Province, Kankyo Hoku, or North Kankyō Province, was a province of Korea under Japanese rule. Its capital was at Seishin (Chongjin). The province consisted what is now the North Korean province of North Hamgyong, as well as parts of neighboring provinces.

== Population ==
Number of people by nationality according to the 1936 census:

- Overall population: 813,893 people
  - Japanese: 45,433 people
  - Koreans: 762,071 people
  - Other: 6,389 people

== Administrative divisions ==
=== Cities ===
Emblem of Seishin

- Seishin (capital)
- Rashin
- Jōshin

=== Counties ===
- Kakujō
- Kisshū
- Meisen
- Kyōjō
- Funei
- Mozan
- Kainei
- Onjō
- Keigen
- Keikō

== Provincial governors ==
Family Register	Name	Chinese Characters	Appointment	Resignation	Remarks
Naichijin	Takei Tomosada	武井 友貞	October 1, 1910	February 14, 1913	Governor of North Hamgyŏng Province
Naichijin	Hoashi Junzō	帆足 準三	February 14, 1913	October 3, 1913	Governor of North Hamgyŏng Province, died in office
Naichijin	Kuwahara Yatsushi	桑原 八司	November 4, 1913	September 23, 1918	Governor of North Hamgyŏng Province
Naichijin	Kanbayashi Keijirō	上林 敬次郎	September 23, 1918	August 5, 1921	Governor; from August 1919, Governor of North Hamgyŏng Province
Naichijin	Saitō Reizō	斉藤 礼三	August 5, 1921	February 24, 1923	
Naichijin	Nakano Tasaburō	中野 太三郎	February 24, 1923	August 14, 1926	
Korean	Pak Yŏng-ch'ŏl	朴榮喆	August 14, 1926	May 18, 1927	
Korean	Pak Sang-jun	朴相駿	May 18, 1927	March 29, 1928	
Naichijin	Adachi Fusajirō	安達 房治郎	March 30, 1928	November 28, 1929	
Naichijin	Furuhashi Takushirō	古橋 卓四郎	November 28, 1929	September 23, 1931	
Naichijin	Andō Kesaichi	安藤 袈裟一	September 23, 1931	September 29, 1931	
Naichijin	Tominaga Fumikazu	富永 文一	October 7, 1931	November 5, 1934	
Naichijin	Takeuchi Takero	竹内 健郎	November 5, 1934	July 30, 1936	
Naichijin	Kojima Takanobu	児島 高信	July 30, 1936	March 9, 1940	
Naichijin	Ōno Ken'ichi	大野 謙一	March 9, 1940	October 23, 1942	
Naichijin	Furukawa Kanehide	古川 兼秀	October 23, 1942	June 26, 1945	
Naichijin	Watanabe Ritsurō	渡部 肆郎	June 26, 1945	August 15, 1945	Tenure ended with Korea's independence

== See also ==
- Provinces of Korea
- Governor-General of Chōsen
- Administrative divisions of Korea
