= Im Chol-ung =

North Korean politician

- 임철웅

Vice Premier of North Korea

14th term
- In office 11 April 2019 – 18 January 2021 Serving with Ro Tu-chol, Kim Tok-hun, Ri Ju-o, Ri Ryong-nam, Jon Kwang-ho, Tong Jong-ho, Ko In-ho and Kim Il-chol
- President: Kim Jong Un
- Premier: Kim Tok-hun; Kim Jae-ryong

13th term
- In office 22 May 2014 – 11 April 2019 Serving with Ro Tu-chol, Kim Yong-jin, Ri Mu-yong, Ri Chol-man and Kim Tok-hun
- Chairman: Kim Jong Un
- Premier: Pak Pong-ju

Personal details
- Born: 27 October 1961 (age 64)
- Party: Workers' Party of Korea

Korean name
- Hangul: 임철웅
- Hanja: 任哲雄
- RR: Im Cheolung
- MR: Im Ch'ŏrung

Im Chol-ung (Korean: 임철웅, born 27 October 1961) is a North Korean politician. Im was a Vice Premier of North Korea. He is also an alternate member of the Politburo of the Workers' Party of Korea (WPK) and a full member of its Central Committee. Im's early career was with rail transport in North Korea, and his rise is seen as a continued effort to improve the sector.

== Career ==
Im's first significant political post was Chief of Staff in the Ministry of Railways from June 2001 to December 2005. Im's career progression was put on hold after his superiors fell out of favor and he had to move out of Pyongyang for "revolutionization". During this time, he held a temporary position as a railways manager. Im returned to Pyongyang in June 2007 as a senior manager at the Pyongyang Railways Bureau. He was re-appointed Chief of Staff in the Ministry of Railways in January 2009. In March 2012, Im played a key role at a meeting of Asian members of the Organization for Cooperation of Railways in Pyongyang. He became the Deputy Minister of Railways the following month.

Im was appointed a Vice Premier of North Korea on 22 May 2014. The decision was formally made by the Presidium of the Supreme People's Assembly, although it is likely that senior party officials had discussed it beforehand. Im's appointment was seen by observers as a sign that North Korea would continue to improve the state of its railways and pursue international rail connections. He was elected an alternate member of the Politburo of the Workers' Party of Korea (WPK) and a full member of its Central Committee at the 7th Congress of the WPK in May 2016. Im was one of several politicians from a civilian background (as opposed to the Korean People's Army and security services) that rose to the Politburo at the Congress, shifting its balance to a more conventional direction.

== See also ==
- Politics of North Korea
