= 14th Cabinet of North Korea =

Cabinet of North Korea (2019–2026)

- State Emblem

11 April 2019 – 22 March 2026 Overview
- Type: Plenary Meeting of the Cabinet of North Korea
- Election: 1st Session of the 14th Supreme People's Assembly
- Secretary-General: Kim Yong-ho

The 14th Cabinet of North Korea was elected by the 1st Session of the 14th Supreme People's Assembly on 11 April 2019.

== Members ==
=== 1st SPA session (2019–21) ===
Rank	Office	Name	Hangul	Took office	Left office	Duration	13th CAB	4th SES
1	Premier of the Cabinet	Kim Jae-ryong	김재룡	11 April 2019	13 August 2020	1 year and 124 days	Old	Replaced
1	Premier of the Cabinet	Kim Tok-hun	김덕훈	13 August 2020	18 January 2021	158 days	Old	Renewed
2	Vice Premier of the Cabinet	Ro Tu-chol	로두철	11 April 2019	11 January 2020	275 days	Old	Not
2	Vice Premier of the Cabinet	Im Chol-ung	임철웅	11 April 2019	18 January 2021	1 year and 282 days	Old	Not
2	Vice Premier of the Cabinet	Kim Tok-hun	김덕훈	11 April 2019	13 August 2020	1 year and 124 days	Old	Promoted
2	Vice Premier of the Cabinet	Ri Ju-o	리주오	11 April 2019	18 January 2021	1 year and 282 days	New	Not
2	Vice Premier of the Cabinet	Ri Ryong-nam	리룡남	11 April 2019	18 January 2021	1 year and 282 days	New	Not
2	Vice Premier of the Cabinet	Jon Kwang-ho	전광호	11 April 2019	18 January 2021	1 year and 282 days	New	Not
2	Vice Premier of the Cabinet	Tong Jong-ho	동정호	11 April 2019	18 January 2021	1 year and 282 days	New	Not
2	Vice Premier of the Cabinet	Ko In-ho	고인호	11 April 2019	18 January 2021	1 year and 282 days	New	Not
2	Vice Premier of the Cabinet	Kim Il-chol	김일철	11 January 2020	18 January 2021	1 year and 7 days	Old	Not
3	Chairman of the State Planning Commission	Ro Tu-chol	로두철	11 April 2019	11 January 2020	275 days	Old	Replaced
3	Chairman of the State Planning Commission	Kim Il-chol	김일철	11 January 2020	18 January 2021	1 year and 7 days	New	Not
4	Minister of Agriculture	Ko In-ho	고인호	11 April 2019	18 January 2021	1 year and 282 days	Old	Not
5	Minister of Foreign Affairs	Ri Yong-ho	리용호	11 April 2019	18 January 2020	282 days	New	Replaced
5	Minister of Foreign Affairs	Ri Son-gwon	리선권	18 January 2020	18 January 2021	1 year and 0 days	New	Renewed
6	Minister of Electric Power Industry	Kim Man-su	김만수	11 April 2019	18 January 2021	1 year and 282 days	New	Not
7	Minister of Coal Industry	Mun Myong-hak	문명학	11 April 2019	11 January 2020	275 days	New	Replaced
7	Minister of Coal Industry	Jon Hak-chol	전학철	11 April 2019	18 January 2021	1 year and 7 days	New	Renewed
8	Minister of Metallurgical Industry	Kim Chung-gol	김충골	11 April 2019	18 January 2021	1 year and 282 days	New	Renewed
9	Minister of Chemical Industry	Jang Kil-ryong	장길룡	11 April 2019	18 January 2021	1 year and 282 days	Old	Not
10	Minister of Railways	Jang Hyok	장혁	11 April 2019	18 January 2021	1 year and 282 days	New	Not
11	Minister of Land and Maritime Transport	Kang Jong-gwan	강종관	11 April 2019	18 January 2021	1 year and 282 days	New	Renewed
12	Minister of Mining Industry	Ryom Chol-su	료철수	11 April 2019	18 January 2021	1 year and 282 days	New	Not
13	Minister of National Natural Resources Development	Kim Chol-su	김철수	11 April 2019	18 January 2021	1 year and 282 days	New	Not
14	Minister of Oil Industry	Ko Kil-son	고길손	11 April 2019	18 January 2021	1 year and 282 days	New	Renewed
15	Minister of Forestry	Han Ryong-guk	한룡국	11 April 2019	18 January 2021	1 year and 282 days	New	Renewed
16	Minister of Machine-Building Industry	Yang Sung-ho	양성호	11 April 2019	18 January 2021	1 year and 282 days	New	Renewed
17	Minister of Shipbuilding	Kang Chol-gu	강철구	11 April 2019	18 January 2021	1 year and 282 days	New	Renewed
18	Minister of Nuclear Power Industry	Wang Chang-uk	왕창욱	11 April 2019	18 January 2021	1 year and 282 days	New	Renewed
19	Minister of Electronics Industry	Kim Jae-song	김재송	11 April 2019	18 January 2021	1 year and 282 days	New	Renewed
20	Minister of Posts and Telecommunications	Kim Kwang-chol	김광철	11 April 2019	18 January 2021	1 year and 282 days	New	Not
21	Minister of Construction and Building-Materials Industry	Pak Hun	박훈	11 April 2019	18 January 2021	1 year and 282 days	New	Not
22	Minister of State Construction Control	Kwon Song-ho	권송호	11 April 2019	18 January 2021	1 year and 282 days	New	Not
23	Minister of Light Industry	Choe Il-ryong	최일룡	11 April 2019	18 January 2021	1 year and 282 days	New	Not
24	Minister of Local Industry	Jo Yong-chol	조영철	11 April 2019	18 January 2021	1 year and 282 days	New	Renewed
25	Minister of Consumer Goods Industry	Ri Kang-son	리강손	11 April 2019	18 January 2021	1 year and 282 days	New	Renewed
26	Minister of Fisheries	Song Chun-sop	송춘섭	11 April 2019	18 January 2021	1 year and 282 days	New	Renewed
27	Minister of Finance	Ki Kwang-ho	기광호	11 April 2019	18 January 2021	1 year and 282 days	New	Not
28	Minister of Labour	Yun Kang-ho	윤강호	11 April 2019	18 January 2021	1 year and 282 days	New	Renewed
29	Minister of External Economic Relations	Kim Yong-jae	김영재	11 April 2019	18 January 2021	1 year and 282 days	New	Not
30	Chairman of the State Commission of Science and Technology	Ri Chung-gil	리청길	11 April 2019	18 January 2021	1 year and 282 days	New	Renewed
31	President of the State Academy of Sciences	Jang Chol	장철	11 April 2019	11 January 2020	275 days	New	Replaced
31	President of the State Academy of Sciences	Kim Sung-jin	김성진	11 January 2020	18 January 2021	1 year and 7 days	New	Renewed
32	Minister of Land and Environment Protection; Chairman of the Supervisory Bureau of Forestry Policy of the State Affairs Commission	Kim Kyong-jun	김경준	11 April 2019	18 January 2021	1 year and 282 days	New	Renewed
33	Minister of Urban Management	Kang Yong-su	강용수	11 April 2019	18 January 2021	1 year and 282 days	New	Not
34	Minister of Food Procurement and Administration	Mun Ung-jo	문웅조	11 April 2019	18 January 2021	1 year and 282 days	New	Renewded
35	Minister of Commerce	Kim Kyong-nam	김경남	11 April 2019	18 January 2021	1 year and 282 days	New	Not
36	Chairman of the Education Commission	Kim Sung-du	김승두	11 April 2019	18 January 2021	1 year and 282 days	New	Renewded
37	President of Kim Il Sung University; Chairman of Kim Il Sung University's WPK Guidance Committee; Minister of Higher Education	Choe Sang-gon	최상건	11 April 2019	18 January 2021	1 year and 282 days	New	Not
38	Minister of Public Health	O Chun-bok	오춘복	11 April 2019	18 January 2021	1 year and 282 days	New	Not
39	Minister of Culture	Pak Chun-nam	박춘남	11 April 2019	11 January 2020	275 days	New	Replaced
39	Minister of Culture	Jon Myong-sik	전명식	11 January 2020	18 January 2021	1 year and 7 days	New	Not
40	Minister of Physical Culture and Sports	Kim Il-guk	김일국	11 April 2019	18 January 2021	1 year and 282 days	New	Renewed
41	Central Bank	Kim Chon-gyun	김천균	11 April 2019	18 January 2021	1 year and 282 days	New	Not
42	Director of the Central Bureau of Statistics	Choe Sung-ho	최성호	11 April 2019	18 January 2021	1 year and 282 days	New	Not
43	Secretary-General of the Cabinet	Kim Yong-ho	김용호	11 April 2019	18 January 2021	1 year and 282 days	New	Not

=== 4th SPA Session (2021–present) ===
During the December 2024 session of the Supreme People's Assembly Kwon Song Hwan was appointed as Minister of Natural Resources Development and Kim Yong Sik as Minister of Commerce.

Rank	Office	Name	Hangul	Took office	Left office	Duration	1st SES
1	Premier of the Cabinet	Kim Tok-hun	김덕훈	18 January 2021	Incumbent	5 years and 271 days	New
2	Vice Premier of the Cabinet	Pak Jong-gun	박종군	18 January 2021	Incumbent	5 years and 271 days	New
2	Vice Premier of the Cabinet	Jon Hyon-chol	전현철	18 January 2021	Incumbent	5 years and 271 days	New
2	Vice Premier of the Cabinet	Kim Song-ryong	김송룡	18 January 2021	Incumbent	5 years and 271 days	New
2	Vice Premier of the Cabinet	Ri Song-hak	리송학	18 January 2021	Incumbent	5 years and 271 days	New
2	Vice Premier of the Cabinet	Pak Hun	박훈	18 January 2021	Incumbent	5 years and 271 days	New
2	Vice Premier of the Cabinet	Ju Chol-gyu	주철규	18 January 2021	Incumbent	5 years and 271 days	New
3	Chairman of the State Planning Commission	Pak Jong-gun	박종군	18 January 2021	Incumbent	5 years and 271 days	New
4	Minister of Agriculture	Ju Chol-gyu	주철규	18 January 2021	Incumbent	5 years and 271 days	New
5	Minister of Foreign Affairs	Ri Son-gwon	리선권	18 January 2021	Incumbent	5 years and 271 days	Old
6	Minister of Electric Power Industry	Kim Yu-il	김유일	18 January 2021	Incumbent	5 years and 271 days	New
7	Minister of Coal Industry	Jon Hak-chol	전학철	18 January 2021	Incumbent	5 years and 271 days	Old
8	Minister of Metallurgical Industry	Kim Chung-gol	김충골	18 January 2021	Incumbent	5 years and 271 days	Old
9	Minister of Chemical Industry	Ma Jong-son	마종손	18 January 2021	Incumbent	5 years and 271 days	New
10	Minister of Railways	Jang Chun-song	장춘송	18 January 2021	Incumbent	5 years and 271 days	New
11	Minister of Land and Maritime Transport	Kang Jong-gwan	강종관	18 January 2021	Incumbent	5 years and 271 days	Old
12	Minister of Mining Industry	Kim Chol-su	김철수	18 January 2021	Incumbent	5 years and 271 days	New
13	Minister of Natural Resources Development	Kim Chung-song	김청송	18 January 2021	Incumbent	5 years and 271 days	New
14	Minister of Oil Industry	Ko Kil-son	고길손	18 January 2021	Incumbent	5 years and 271 days	Old
15	Minister of Forestry	Han Ryong-guk	한룡국	18 January 2021	Incumbent	5 years and 271 days	Old
16	Minister of Machine-Building Industry	Yang Sung-ho	양성호	18 January 2021	Incumbent	5 years and 271 days	Old
17	Minister of Shipbuilding	Kang Chol-gu	강철구	18 January 2021	Incumbent	5 years and 271 days	Old
18	Minister of Nuclear Power Industry	Wang Chang-uk	왕창욱	18 January 2021	Incumbent	5 years and 271 days	Old
19	Minister of Electronics Industry	Kim Jae-song	김재송	18 January 2021	Incumbent	5 years and 271 days	Old
20	Minister of Posts and Telecommunications	Ju Yong-il	주용일	18 January 2021	Incumbent	5 years and 271 days	New
21	Minister of Construction and Building-Materials Industry	So Jong-jin	소종진	18 January 2021	Incumbent	5 years and 271 days	New
22	Minister of Light Industry	Jang Kyong-il	장경일	18 January 2021	Incumbent	5 years and 271 days	New
23	Minister of Local Industry	Jo Yong-chol	조용철	18 January 2021	Incumbent	5 years and 271 days	Old
24	Minister of Consumer Goods Industry	Ri Kang-son	리강손	18 January 2021	Incumbent	5 years and 271 days	Old
25	Minister of Fisheries	Song Chun-sop	송춘섭	18 January 2021	Incumbent	5 years and 271 days	Old
26	Minister of Finance	Ko Jong-bom	고종봄	18 January 2021	Incumbent	5 years and 271 days	New
27	Minister of Labour	Jin Kum-song	진금송	18 January 2021	Incumbent	5 years and 271 days	New
28	Minister of External Economic Relations	Yun Jong-ho	윤종호	18 January 2021	Incumbent	5 years and 271 days	New
29	Chairman of the State Commission of Science and Technology	Ri Chung-gil	리청길	18 January 2021	Incumbent	5 years and 271 days	Old
30	President of the State Academy of Sciences	Kim Sung-jin	김성진	18 January 2021	Incumbent	5 years and 271 days	Old
31	Minister of Land and Environment Protection; Chairman of the Supervisory Bureau of Forestry Policy of the State Affairs Commission	Kim Kyong-jun	김경준	18 January 2021	Incumbent	5 years and 271 days	Old
32	Minister of Urban Management	Im Kyong-jae	임경재	18 January 2021	Incumbent	5 years and 271 days	New
33	Minister of Food Procurement and Administration	Mun Ung-jo	문웅조	18 January 2021	Incumbent	5 years and 271 days	Old
34	Minister of Commerce	Pak Hyok-chol	박혁철	18 January 2021	Incumbent	5 years and 271 days	New
35	Minister of State Construction Control	Ri Hyok-gwon	리혁권	18 January 2021	Incumbent	5 years and 271 days	New
36	Chairman of the Education Commission	Kim Sung-du	김승두	18 January 2021	Incumbent	5 years and 271 days	Old
37	President of Kim Il Sung University; Minister of Higher Education under the Education Commission	Ri Kuk-chol	리국철	18 January 2021	Incumbent	5 years and 271 days	New
38	Minister of Public Health	Choe Kyong-chol	최경철	18 January 2021	Incumbent	5 years and 271 days	New
39	Minister of Culture	Sung Jong-gyu	성종규	18 January 2021	Incumbent	5 years and 271 days	New
40	Minister of Physical Culture and Sports	Kim Il-guk	김일국	18 January 2021	Incumbent	5 years and 271 days	Old
41	President of the Central Bank	Chae Song-hak	채송학	18 January 2021	Incumbent	5 years and 271 days	New
42	Director of the Central Bureau of Statistics	Ri Chol-san	리철산	18 January 2021	Incumbent	5 years and 271 days	New
43	Secretary-General of the Cabinet	[[]]	김금철	18 January 2021	Incumbent	5 years and 271 days	New
