= 12th Cabinet of North Korea =

- State Emblem

9 April 2009 – 9 April 2014 (5 years, 0 days) Overview
- Type: Plenary Meeting of the Cabinet of North Korea
- Election: 1st Session of the 12th Supreme People's Assembly
- Secretary: Jong Mun-san

The 12th Cabinet of North Korea was elected by the 1st Session of the 12th Supreme People's Assembly on 9 April 2009. It was replaced on 9 April 2014 by the 13th Cabinet.

== Members ==
Rank	Office	Name	Hangul	Took office	Left office	Duration	11th CAB	13th CAB
1	Premier of the Cabinet	Kim Yong-il	김영일	9 April 2009	4 June 2010	1 year and 56 days	Old	Not
1	Premier of the Cabinet	Choe Yong-rim	최영림	4 June 2010	1 April 2013	2 years and 301 days	New	Not
1	Premier of the Cabinet	Pak Pong-ju	박봉주	1 April 2013	9 April 2014	1 year and 8 days	New	Reelected
2	Vice Premier of the Cabinet	Kwak Pom-gi	곽범기	9 April 2009	9 April 2014	5 years and 0 days	Old	Not
2	Vice Premier of the Cabinet	Thae Jong-su	태종수	9 April 2009	9 April 2014	5 years and 0 days	New	Not
2	Vice Premier of the Cabinet	Ro Tu-chol	로두철	9 April 2009	9 April 2014	5 years and 0 days	Old	Reelected
2	Vice Premier of the Cabinet	O Su-yong	오수용	9 April 2009	9 April 2014	5 years and 0 days	Old	Not
3	Chairman of the State Planning Commission	Ro Tu-chol	로두철	9 April 2009	9 April 2014	5 years and 0 days	Old	Not
4	Minister of Foreign Affairs	Pak Ui-chun	박의춘	9 April 2009	9 April 2014	5 years and 0 days	Old	Not
5	Minister of Public Security	Jang Sang-song	장상송	9 April 2009	9 April 2014	5 years and 0 days	New	Not
6	Minister of Electric Power Industry	Ho Thaek	호택	9 April 2009	14 April 2012	3 years and 5 days	New	Not
6	Minister of Electric Power Industry	Kim Man-su	김만수	14 April 2012	9 April 2014	1 year and 360 days	New	Reelected
7	Minister of Coal Industry	Kim Hyong-sik	김형식	9 April 2009	9 April 2014	5 years and 0 days	New	Not
8	Minister of Mining Industry	Kang Min-chol	강민철	9 April 2009	9 April 2014	5 years and 0 days	New	Not
9	Minister of Oil Industry	Kim Hui-yong	김희용	9 April 2009	9 April 2014	5 years and 0 days	New	Not
10	Minister of Metal Industry	Kim Thae-bong	김태봉	9 April 2009	9 April 2014	5 years and 0 days	New	Not
11	Minister of Machine-Building Industry	Jo Pyong-ju	조평주	9 April 2009	9 April 2014	5 years and 0 days	New	Not
12	Minister of Electronics Industry	Han Kwang-bok	한광복	9 April 2009	9 April 2014	5 years and 0 days	New	Not
13	Minister of Construction and Building-Materials Industry	Tong Jong-ho	동정호	9 April 2009	9 April 2014	5 years and 0 days	New	Reelected
14	Minister of Railways	Jon Kil-su	존길수	9 April 2009	9 April 2014	5 years and 0 days	New	Not
15	Minister of Land and Marine Transport	Ra Tong-hui	라통휘	9 April 2009	14 April 2012	3 years and 5 days	New	Not
15	Minister of Land and Marine Transport	Kang Jong-gwan	강종관	14 April 2012	9 April 2014	1 year and 360 days	New	Reelected
16	Minister of Agriculture	Kim Chang-sik	김창식	9 April 2009	1 April 2013	3 years and 357 days	New	Not
16	Minister of Agriculture	Ri Chol-man	리철만	1 April 2013	9 April 2014	1 year and 8 days	New	Reelected
17	Minister of Chemical Industry	Ri Mu-yong	리무영	9 April 2009	9 April 2014	5 years and 0 days	Old	Reelected
18	Minister of Light Industry	Ri Ju-o	리주오	9 April 2009	9 April 2014	5 years and 0 days	Old	Not
19	Minister of Foreign Trade	Ri Ryong-nam	리룡남	9 April 2009	9 April 2014	5 years and 0 days	New	Reelected
20	Minister of Forestry	Kim Kwang-yong	김광용	9 April 2009	9 April 2014	5 years and 0 days	New	Not
21	Minister of Fisheries	Pak Thae-won	박태원	9 April 2009	9 April 2014	5 years and 0 days	New	Not
22	Minister of Urban Management	Hwang Hak-won	황학원	9 April 2009	9 April 2014	5 years and 0 days	New	Not
23	Minister of Land and Environmental Conservation	Pak Song-nam	박송남	9 April 2009	9 April 2014	5 years and 0 days	New	Not
24	Minister of State Construction Control	Pae Tal-jun	배달준	9 April 2009	9 April 2014	5 years and 0 days	Old	Not
25	Minister of Commerce	Kim Pong-chol	김봉철	9 April 2009	14 February 2012	2 years and 311 days	New	Dead
25	Minister of Commerce	Kim Kyong-nam	김경남	14 February 2012	9 April 2014	2 years and 54 days	New	Not
26	Minister of Food Procurement and Administration	Mun Ung-jo	문웅조	9 April 2009	9 April 2014	5 years and 0 days	New	Reelected
27	Minister of Education	Kim Yong-jin	김용진	9 April 2009	9 April 2014	5 years and 0 days	Old	Reelected
28	Minister of Posts and Telecommunications	Ryu Yong-sop	류용섭	9 April 2009	9 April 2014	5 years and 0 days	New	Not
29	Minister of Culture	Kang Nung-su	강능수	9 April 2009	9 April 2014	5 years and 0 days	New	Not
30	Minister of Finance	Kim Wan-su	김완수	9 April 2009	9 April 2014	5 years and 0 days	Old	Not
31	Minister of Labour	Jong Yong-su	종용수	9 April 2009	9 April 2014	5 years and 0 days	New	Reelected
32	Minister of Public Health	Choe Chang-sik	최창식	9 April 2009	9 April 2014	5 years and 0 days	New	Not
33	Minister of State Inspection	Kim Ui-sun	김의선	9 April 2009	9 April 2014	5 years and 0 days	Old	Not
34	President of the State Academy of Sciences	Pyon Yong-rip	변영립	9 April 2009	9 April 2014	5 years and 0 days	Old	Not
35	Chairman of the Physical Culture and Sports Guidance Commission	Pak Hak-son	박학손	9 April 2009	9 April 2014	5 years and 0 days	New	Not
36	President of the Central Bank	Ri Kwang-gon	리광곤	9 April 2009	9 April 2014	5 years and 0 days	New	Not
37	Chairman of the Central Statistical Board	Kim Chang-su	김창수	9 April 2009	9 April 2014	5 years and 0 days	Old	Not
38	Director of the Secretariat of the Cabinet	Kim Yong-ho	김용호	9 April 2009	9 April 2014	5 years and 0 days	New	Reelected
39	Minister of Capital Construction	Kim Ung-gwan	김웅관	9 April 2009	9 April 2014	5 years and 0 days	New	Not
