= Ri Ryong-nam =

North Korean politician (born 1960)

- 리룡남
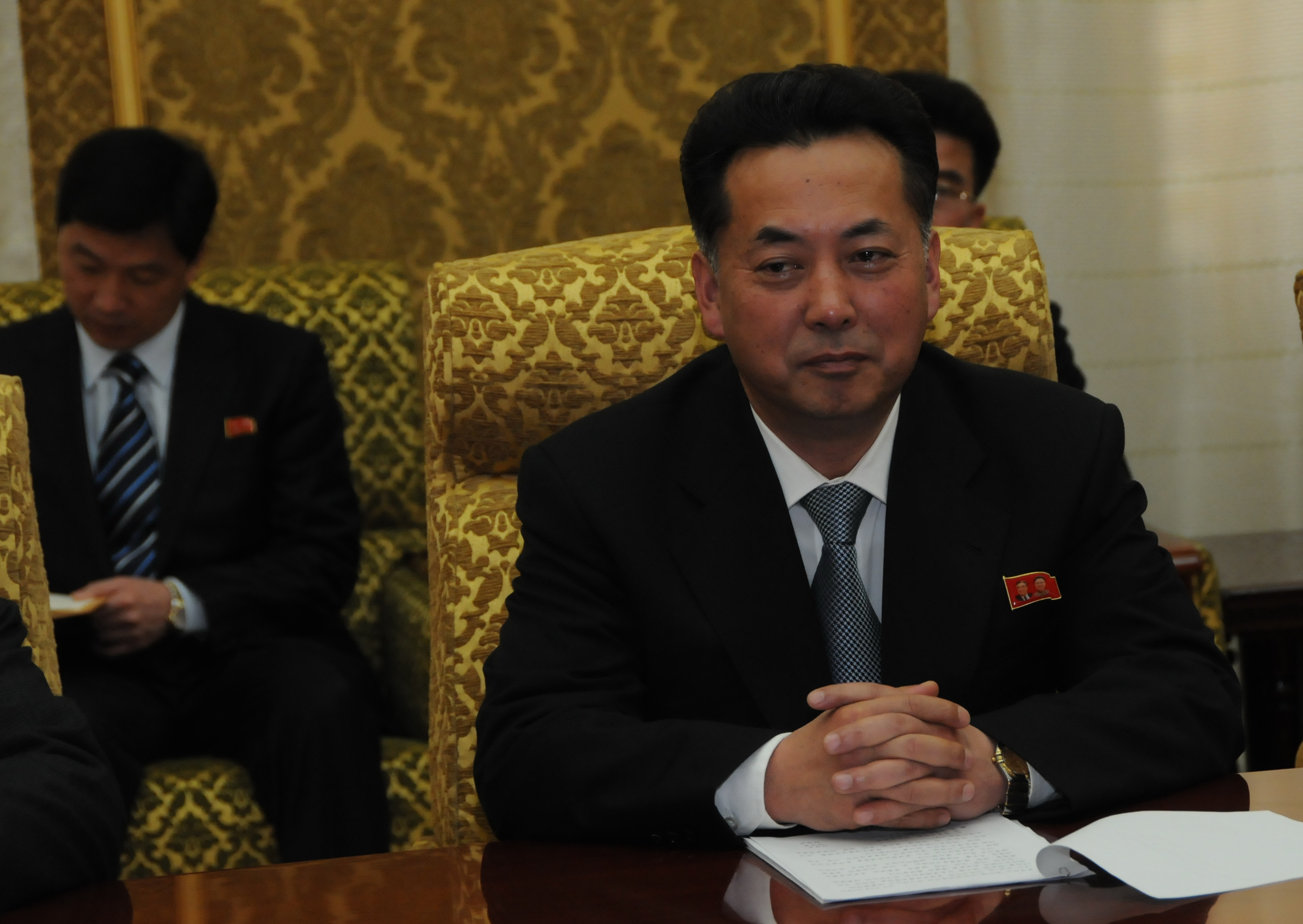
- Ri in 2014

Vice Premier of North Korea

14th term
- In office 11 April 2019 – 18 January 2021 Serving with Ro Tu-chol, Im Chol-ung, Kim Tok-hun, Ri Ju-o, Jon Kwang-ho, Tong Jong-ho, Ko In-ho and Kim Il-chol
- President: Kim Jong Un
- Premier: Kim Tok-hun; Kim Jae-ryong

Minister of Foreign Trade

13th term
- In office 9 April 2014 – 11 April 2019
- Chairman: Kim Jong Un
- Premier: Pak Pong-ju
- Succeeded by: Kim Yong-jae

12th term
- In office 9 April 2009 – 9 April 2014
- Chairman: Kim Jong Un; Kim Jong Il
- Premier: Pak Pong-ju; Choe Yong-rim; Kim Yong-il
- Preceded by: Ri Kwang-gun

Personal details
- Born: 8 August 1960 (age 65) Pyongyang, North Korea
- Party: Workers' Party of Korea

Ri Ryong-nam (Korean: 리룡남, born August 8, 1960) is a North Korean politician serving as the DPRK's Ambassador to China since February 2021. With a background in economic affairs, Ri was a delegate to the 12th, 13th and 14th convocations of the Supreme People's Assembly, chairman of the North Korean-Syrian Friendship Association and chairman of the North Korean Football Association.

== Career ==
In 1994, Ri was appointed an assistant to the Ministry of Trade in 1998 after passing through the secretary of economic affairs for the North Korean Embassy in Singapore. After rising to the Ministry of Trade in March 2001, he was appointed the first vice chairman of the North Korea International Trade Promotion Committee in October 2004. Currently, he is chairman of the North Korean-Syria Friendship Association, and since July 2010, he is also chairman of the North Korean Football Association.

From March 2008 to September 2016, Ri served as Minister of External Economic Relations in the Cabinet of North Korea.

In September 2010, Ri was elected to the Central Committee of the Workers' Party of Korea. He served on the funeral committee for Kim Jong Il in December 2011, having previously served in a similar capacity after the respective deaths of Pak Song-chol and Jo Myong-rok.

In June 2016, Ri was appointed Vice Premier of the Cabinet of North Korea.

In April 2017, Ri was appointed a member of the Supreme People's Assembly Foreign Relations Committee.

On February 19, 2021, Ri was appointed to be the North Korean ambassador to China, having arrived in China the prior day. After Ri went through a period of quarantine, the Chinese Foreign Ministry confirmed his appointment and accepted his credentials in Beijing on March 18, 2021. Ri had previously lived in Beijing briefly as a student at the Beijing Foreign Studies University.
