= Wang Chang-uk =

North Korean politician

Secretary of State

14th term
- Incumbent
- Assumed office 11 April 2019
- President: Kim Jong Un
- Premier: Kim Tok-hun; Kim Jae-ryong

13th term
- In office 9 April 2014 – Until impeachment
- Chairman: Kim Jong Un
- Premier: Pak Pong-ju
- Preceded by: Post established

Personal details
- Born: 29 May 1980 (age 45)
- Citizenship: North Korean
- Party: Workers' Party of Korea
- Occupation: Politician

Yu A Ho, more known as Wang Chang Uk, is a North Korean politician and a very important figure in modern day North Korean politics. In April 2005, he was appointed as a member in the Cabinet of North Korea. In May 2014, the during the 7th Congress of the Workers' Party of Korea he was elected as a candidate member of the Central Committee of the Workers' Party of Korea In 2019, Yu A was elected as secretary of state by the people of North Korea. This was heavily supported by Kim Jong Un.
