= Choe Jae-u =

North Korean politician

- 최재우

Vice Premier of North Korea
- Supreme Leader: Kim Jong-il

Personal details
- Born: 1913 North Hamgyong Province, Korea
- Died: 2004 (aged 90–91)
- Resting place: Patriotic Martyrs' Cemetery
- Citizenship: North Korean
- Party: Workers' Party of Korea

Military service
- Allegiance: North Korea

Choe Jae-u (Korean: 최재우) (1913–2004) was a North Korean politician and technocrat who served as a Vice Premier of North Korea.

== Biography ==
It is known that he was born in North Hamgyong Province in 1913. In 1948, he served as an executive director of the North Hamgyong Provincial Party Committee of the Workers' Party of Korea, and in 1954 he became the manager of the Chongjin Steel Works. In April 1957, he was appointed vice-chairman of the National Planning Commission of the Cabinet. In September 1957, he was appointed Vice Minister of Machinery Industry, and on February 13, 1958, by decree of the Presidium of the Supreme People's Assembly, he was appointed as the new Minister of Machinery Industry, succeeding Cheng Il-ryong. On September 7, 1958, along with Kim Eung-gi, Kim Eung-sang, Lee Byeong-nam, Park Moon-gyu, Park Se-chang, Yoo Cheol-mok, Jeong Jeong-eon, and Choi Jae-ha, he was awarded the Second Class of the Order of the National Flag on the occasion of the 10th Anniversary of the founding of North Korea. He probably had a good track record in the heavy industry sector. In November 1958, he served as a member of the funeral committee of Ryu Kyung-su.

On April 4, 1960, as the Ministry of Machinery Industry, the Ministry of Metal Industry, and the Ministry of Power and Chemical Industry were merged into the Heavy Industry Committee, he was appointed as the Vice Chairman of the Heavy Industry Committee. In August 1961, he served as the President of the Academic Affairs Department of Kim Il-sung University and as the Chairman of the Geodetic and Geophysical Committee of the Academy of Sciences. In September 1961, he was elected as a candidate member of the Central Committee at the 4th party congress. On April 21, 1962, he returned to the Cabinet when he was appointed as the first secretary-general of the cabinet. In August 1965, he served as a member of the funeral committee of Jang Young-Chang Kang. In November 1967, he was appointed deputy to the 4th Supreme People's Assembly and head of the First Secretariat of the Cabinet. In January 1969, he served as a commissioner for Kim Gap-sun, and in March 1969, he served as a commissioner for Kim Tae-geun. In November 1970, he was promoted to a member of the Central Committee at the 5th Party Congress, and on March 25, 1971, by decree of the Presidium of the Supreme People's Assembly, he was appointed Deputy Prime Minister of the cabinet.

In December 1972, he was re-elected as a delegate to the 5th Supreme People's Assembly, while appointed Deputy Prime Minister and Chairman of the National Planning Council and a member of the Central People's Committee. In January 1973, he served as a member of the funeral committee Jang Jun-taek. In March 1973, he was by-elected as a candidate member of the politburo, and on September 20, 1973, by decree of the Central People's Committee, he handed over the position of Chairman of the National Planning Commission to Hong Song-nam. Afterwards, he moved to the head of the foreign economy business department, as mentioned in a report by the Rodong Sinmun. In March 1976, he served as a member of the funeral committee following the death of Nam Il, May 1976, Hong Won-gil, September 1976, Choe Yong-gon, and January 1980, Ro Tae-sok. In October 1980, he was elected as a candidate (non-voting) member of the Politburo at the 6th Party Congress.

In April 1982, he was re-elected as a deputy to the 7th Supreme People's Assembly while appointed deputy prime minister and chairman of the machinery industry. In April 1982, he was awarded the Order of Kim Il-sung in commemoration of Kim Il-sung's 70th birthday. In April 1982, he served as a funeral director, Choe Hyon in January 1983, Kang Ryang-uk, and in September 1983, Kim Il-dae. However, he was dismissed from the deputy prime minister in December 1983, and it appears that he was also recalled as a candidate for the Politburo and assumed the position of chairman of the national science and technology committee. He served until May 1985, when he was dismissed and replaced by Ri Cha-pang (Japanese: 李子方). In November 1986, he was re-elected as a delegate to the 8th Supreme People's Assembly, but did not receive any special posts. Thereafter, there is a record that he received a doctorate degree in September 1992, and since then, there has been no mention of it.

He died in November 2004 and was buried in the Patriotic Martyrs' Cemetery in Pyongyang.
