= Kim Hwan =

North Korean politician and technocrat

- 김환

Vice Premier of North Korea
- Chairman: Kim Il Sung

Vice President of the Central Court
- In office ?–?

Personal details
- Born: 1929 Kimhyongjik County, Ryanggang Province, Korea, Empire of Japan
- Died: May 2009 (aged 79–80) Pyongyang, North Korea
- Resting place: Patriotic Martyrs' Cemetery
- Citizenship: North Korean
- Party: Workers' Party of Korea
- Education: Mangyongdae Revolutionary School
- Alma mater: Kim Il Sung University
- Occupation: Politician

Kim Hwan (Korean: 김환; 1929–May 2009) was a North Korean politician and technocrat who served as a Vice Premier of North Korea.

== Biography ==
He was born in 1929 in Kimhyongjik County, Ryanggang Province, a son of partisan Kim Hyuk, and the son-in-law of Kim Il. After graduating from Mangyongdae Revolutionary School, he went on to the Faculty of Chemical Engineering at Kim Il Sung University and studied in East Germany, graduating from the Karl Marx Institute of Technology under the University of Leipzig After returning to Korea, he served as a researcher at the Institute of Chemical Industry of the Ministry of Heavy Industry in 1961 and moved to Hamhung Institute of Technology in 1963 as an assistant professor of analytical chemistry. In 1967, he served as a researcher at the Institute of Hyperthermic Chemistry at the Hamhung branch of the Academy of Sciences. After entering the cabinet, he was appointed deputy Minister of Textile and Paper Industry in 1968. In December 1972, with the adoption of the Socialist Constitution and the constitutional changes which established the presidency, he was appointed as the Minister of the Chemical Industry, serving until 1976, before passing it on to Wondong-gu.

In October 1974, he was by-elected as a member of the Central Committee, and in March 1976 he served as a member of the funeral committee of Nam Il, of Hong Won-gil in May, and a of Choe Yong-gon in September. When the 6th Supreme People's Assembly was convened in 1977, he was elected a member of the Qualifications Committee and Central People's Committee. His progress in promotion continued, and in September 1978 he was elected as a member of the Politburo and secretary of the Secretariat, and in September 1978, he served as a member of the funeral committee of Han Ik-su. In October 1980, he was retained as a member of the Politburo and secretary of the Secretariat at the 6th Party Congress. In February 1982, he was elected as the chairman of the budget committee at the 7th Supreme People's Assembly, and on April 2, he was awarded the Order of Kim Il Sung in commemoration of Kim Il Sung's 70th birthday by decree of the Central People's Committee. In April 1982, he served as a member of the funeral committee of Choe Hyon, in January 1983 of Kang Ryang-uk, and in September 1983 of Kim Il-dae.

At the 7th Plenary Session of the 6th CC of the Workers' Party of Korea held from June 15 to 17, 1983, he was dismissed as the secretary of the Secretariat. In March 1984, he served as a member of the funeral committee of Kim Il, and in April, he served as a member of the funeral committee of Oh Baek-ryong. In April 1986, he served as a member of the funeral commission of Kim Jwa-hyok (김좌혁) and Chon Se-bong (천세봉), and in October 1986 he was dispatched as a special envoy to Mozambique.

When the 8th Supreme People's Assembly was convened in December 1986, he was elected as the chairman of the Chemical and Light Industry Committee, replacing Jong Mu-won. In August 1987, he served as a member of the funeral committee of Pak Yong-sun. On February 12, 1988, in accordance with the decree of the Central People's Committee, he was again appointed as the Deputy Prime Minister and Chairman of the Chemical and Light Industry Committee, and in April 1988 he served in the funeral committee of Yim Chun-chu. In May 1990, at the 9th Supreme People's Assembly, Jong Mu-won was appointed deputy prime minister and Minister of the Chemical Industry, a position from which he was dismissed on December 18, 1991. In 1995, he attended the 50th anniversary of the founding of the Workers' Party of Korea, and in February 1996, he served as a member of the funeral committee of Ri Sung-gi. He only appeared again in 1997 for the appointment of Kim Jong Il as general secretary.

However, there has been no news since then and he was dismissed as the deputy prime minister at the 10th Supreme People's Assembly in 1998. He died in May 2009 and was buried on the 28th of that month at the Patriotic Martyrs' Cemetery.

== Bibliography ==
- Information Analysis Bureau of the Ministry of Unification, Data Collection of Key People in North Korea 2000 (Seoul: Ministry of Unification, 2000)
- Hyun Seong-il, National Strategy and Power Elite in North Korea: Focusing on Executive Policy (Seoul, 2007)
- Seo Dong-man, History of the establishment of the socialist system in North Korea 1945-1961 (Seoul, 2005).
