= Pak Chun-nam =

North Korean politician

Minister of Culture

14th term
- In office 11 April 2019 – 18 January 2021
- President: Kim Jong Un
- Premier: Kim Tok-hun; Kim Jae-ryong
- Succeeded by: Sung Jong-gyu

13th term
- In office 9 April 2014 – 11 April 2019
- Chairman: Kim Jong Un
- Premier: Pak Pong-ju
- Preceded by: Kang Nung-su

Personal details
- Citizenship: North Korean
- Party: Workers' Party of Korea
- Occupation: Politician

Pak Chun-nam (Korean: 박춘남) is a politician of North Korea. He was Minister of Culture in the Cabinet of North Korea from 2014 to 2019 and a candidate member of the Central Committee of the Workers' Party of Korea.

== Biography ==
After being appointed to the Ministry of Culture in September 2011, he served as the director of the Ministry of Culture, Culture and Tourism since July 2012, and was appointed to the Cultural Prize in September 2013 as the successor to Hong Kwang-sun. In May 2016, the 7th Congress of the Workers 'Party of Korea was elected as a candidate for the Central Committee of the Workers' Party of Korea.
