= Jang Chol =

North Korean politician and scientist (born 1955)

President of the State Academy of Sciences

14th term
- Incumbent
- Assumed office 9 April 2014
- President: Kim Jong Un
- Premier: Kim Tok-hun; Kim Jae-ryong
- Succeeded by: Kim Sung-jin

13th term
- In office 9 April 2014 – 11 April 2019
- Chairman: Kim Jong Un
- Premier: Pak Pong-ju
- Preceded by: Pyon Yong-rip

Personal details
- Born: 1955 (age 70–71) Pyongyang, North Korea
- Citizenship: North Korean
- Party: Workers' Party of Korea
- Occupation: Politician, scientist

Jang Chol (Korean: 장철, born 1955) is a North Korean politician and scientist. He served as President of the State Academy of Sciences under the Cabinet of North Korea and a member of the Central Committee of the Workers' Party of Korea. He was elected a deputy to the 11th and 12th convocations of the Supreme People's Assembly, North Korea's unicameral parliament.

== Biography ==
Jang was born in 1955 in Pyongyang. In February 1999, he was appointed the manager of the state-of-the-art electronic engineering base at the National Academy of Sciences, and was appointed the manager of the enterprise where Jeon Hee-seok works. Since serving as Director of the National Academy of Sciences in 2005, he has been the Director of the Academy of Sciences of the Democratic People's Republic of Korea since September 2009. In September 2010, he was elected to the Central Committee of the Workers' Party of Korea. In 2003, he served as a member of the 11th convocation to the Supreme People's Assembly and following the April 2009, he has been member of the 12th convocation. At the time of the death of Jo Myong-rok in 2010 and death of Kim Jong Il in 2011, he was a member of the funeral committee.
