= Ki Kwang-ho =

North Korean politician

Minister of Finance

14th term
- Incumbent
- Assumed office 11 April 2019 – January 2021
- President: Kim Jong Un
- Premier: Kim Tok-hun; Kim Jae-ryong
- Succeeded by: Ko Jong-bom

13th term
- In office 19 February 2015 – 11 April 2019
- Chairman: Kim Jong Un
- Premier: Pak Pong-ju
- Preceded by: Choe Kwang-jin

Personal details
- Citizenship: North Korean
- Party: Workers' Party of Korea
- Occupation: Politician

Ki Kwang-ho (Korean: 기광호; born 1957) is a politician of North Korea. He is a candidate member of the Political Bureau of the Central Committee of the Workers' Party of Korea as well as Minister of Finance in the Cabinet of North Korea. He is the chairman of the Chosun Ice Figure Association.

== Biography ==
After serving as Director of the Ministry of Finance and Economy of the Cabinet, he served as the Vice Minister of Finance from May 2011 to February 2015. In February 2015, Ki Kwang-ho was appointed Minister of Finance. In May 2016, the 7th Congress of the Workers 'Party of Korea was elected as a candidate for the Central Committee of the Workers' Party of Korea. In 2019 he was elected to the 14th convocation of the Supreme People's Assembly.
