= Jang Kil-ryong =

North Korean politician

Minister of Chemical Industry

14th term
- In office 11 April 2019 – 18 January 2021
- President: Kim Jong Un
- Premier: Pak Pong-ju
- Succeeded by: Ma Jong-son

13th term
- In office 11 April 2019 – 11 April 2017
- Chairman: Kim Jong Un
- Premier: Pak Pong-ju
- Preceded by: Ri Mu-yong

Personal details
- Citizenship: North Korean
- Party: Workers' Party of Korea
- Occupation: Politician

Jang Kil-ryong (Korean: 장길룡) is a politician of the Democratic People's Republic of Korea. He was Minister of Chemical Industry in the Cabinet of North Korea and candidate member of the Political Bureau of the Central Committee of the Workers' Party of Korea.

== Biography ==
He served as the director of the Hamhung branch of the National Academy of Sciences and the exterior materials research center of the Hamhung branch of the Academy of Sciences of North Korea. In April 2017, he was appointed to the Minister Chemical Industry in the Cabinet as a successor to Lim Mu-yong (리무영). In May 2016, during the 7th Congress of the Workers' Party of Korea he was elected as a candidate member of the Central Committee of the Workers' Party of Korea.
