= 13th Cabinet of North Korea =

- State Emblem

9 April 2014 – 11 April 2019 (5 years, 0 days) Overview
- Type: Plenary Meeting of the Cabinet of North Korea
- Election: 1st Session of the 13th Supreme People's Assembly
- Secretary: Jong Mun-san

The 13th Cabinet of North Korea was elected by the 1st Session of the 13th Supreme People's Assembly on 9 April 2014. It was replaced on 11 April 2019 by the 14th Cabinet.

== Members ==
Rank	Office	Name	Hangul	Took office	Left office	Duration	12th CAB	14th CAB
1	Premier of the Cabinet	Pak Pong-ju	박봉주	9 April 2014	11 April 2019	5 years and 2 days	Old	Not
2	Vice Premier of the Cabinet	Ro Tu-chol	로두철	9 April 2014	11 April 2019	5 years and 2 days	Old	Reelected
2	Vice Premier of the Cabinet	Kim Yong-jin	김용진	9 April 2014	July 2016	2 years and 83 days	Old	Dead
2	Vice Premier of the Cabinet	Ri Mu-yong	리무영	9 April 2014	11 April 2019	5 years and 2 days	Old	Not
2	Vice Premier of the Cabinet	Ri Chol-man	리철만	9 April 2014	11 April 2019	5 years and 2 days	Old	Not
3	Chairman of the State Planning Commission	Ro Tu-chol	로두철	9 April 2014	11 April 2019	5 years and 2 days	Old	Reelected
4	Minister of Chemical Industry	Ri Mu-yong	리무영	9 April 2014	11 April 2017	3 years and 2 days	Old	Not
4	Minister of Chemical Industry	Jang Kil-ryong	장길룡	11 April 2017	11 April 2019	5 years and 2 days	Old	Reelected
5	Minister of Agriculture	Ri Chol-man	리철만	9 April 2014	17 May 2016	2 years and 38 days	Old	Not
5	Minister of Agriculture	Ko In-ho	고인호	17 May 2016	11 April 2019	2 years and 329 days	Old	Reelected
6	Minister of Foreign Affairs	Ri Su-yong	리수용	9 April 2014	13 May 2016	2 years and 34 days	New	Not
6	Minister of Foreign Affairs	Ri Yong-ho	리용호	13 May 2016	11 April 2019	2 years and 333 days	New	Reelected
7	Minister of Electric Power Industry	Kim Man-su	김만수	9 April 2014	11 April 2019	5 years and 2 days	New	Reelected
8	Minister of Coal Industry	Mun Myong-hak	문명학	9 April 2014	11 April 2019	5 years and 2 days	New	Reelected
9	Minister of Metallurgical Industry	Kim Yong-gwang	김용광	9 April 2014	11 April 2019	5 years and 2 days	New	Not
10	Minister of Railways	Jon Kil-su	존길수	9 April 2014	11 April 2019	5 years and 2 days	Old	Not
11	Minister of Land and Maritime Transport	Kang Jong-gwan	강종관	9 April 2014	11 April 2019	5 years and 2 days	New	Reelected
12	Minister of Mining Industry	Ri Hak-chol	리학철	9 April 2014	11 April 2019	5 years and 2 days	New	Not
13	Minister of State Natural Resources Development	Ri Chun-sam	리춘삼	9 April 2014	11 April 2019	5 years and 2 days	New	Not
14	Minister of Oil Industry	Pae Hak	패학	9 April 2014	11 April 2019	5 years and 2 days	New	Not
15	Minister of Forestry	Han Ryong-guk	한룡국	9 April 2014	11 April 2019	5 years and 2 days	New	Reelected
16	Minister of Machine-Building Industry	Ri Jong-guk	리종국	9 April 2014	11 April 2019	5 years and 2 days	New	Not
17	Minister of Atomic Energy Industry	Ri Je-son	리제손	9 April 2014	11 April 2019	5 years and 2 days	New	Not
18	Minister of Electronics Industry	Kim Jae-song	김재송	9 April 2014	11 April 2019	5 years and 2 days	New	Reelected
19	Minister of Posts and Telecommunications	Sim Chol-ho	심철호	9 April 2014	October 2014	175 days	New	Dead
19	Minister of Posts and Telecommunications	Kim Kwang-chol	김광철	2015	11 April 2019	4 years and 100 days	New	Reelected
20	Minister of Construction and Building-Materials Industry	Tong Jong-ho	동정호	9 April 2014	11 April 2019	5 years and 2 days	Old	Reelected
21	Minister of State Construction Control	Kwon Song-ho	권송호	9 April 2014	11 April 2019	5 years and 2 days	New	Reelected
22	Minister of Food and Consumer Goods Industries	Jo Yong-chol	조용철	9 April 2014	11 April 2019	5 years and 2 days	New	Reelected
23	Minister of Fisheries	Ri Hyok	리혁	9 April 2014	11 April 2019	5 years and 2 days	New	Not
24	Minister of Finance	Choe Kwang-jin	최광진	9 April 2014	19 February 2015	316 days	New	Not
24	Minister of Finance	Ki Kwang-ho	기광호	19 February 2015	11 April 2019	4 years and 51 days	New	Not
25	Minister of Labour	Jong Yong-su	종용수	9 April 2014	11 April 2019	5 years and 2 days	Old	Not
26	Minister of Foreign Trade	Ri Ryong-nam	리룡남	9 April 2014	11 April 2019	5 years and 2 days	Old	Reelected
27	Chairman of the State Science and Technology Commission	Choe Sang-gon	최상건	9 April 2014	11 April 2019	5 years and 2 days	New	Reelected
28	President of the State Academy of Sciences	Jang Chol	장철	9 April 2014	11 April 2019	5 years and 2 days	New	Reelected
29	Minister of Land and Environment Protection	Kim Kyong-jun	김경준	9 April 2014	11 April 2019	5 years and 2 days	New	Reelected
30	Minister of Urban Management	Kang Yong-su	강용수	9 April 2014	11 April 2019	5 years and 2 days	New	Reelected
31	Minister of Food Procurement and Administration	Mun Ung-jo	문웅조	9 April 2014	11 April 2019	5 years and 2 days	Old	Reelected
32	Minister of Commerce	Kim Kyong-nam	김경남	9 April 2014	11 April 2019	5 years and 2 days	New	Reelected
33	Chairman of the Education Commission; Minister of General Education	Kim Sung-du	김승두	9 April 2014	11 April 2019	5 years and 2 days	New	Reelected
34	President of Kim Il Sung University; Minister of Higher Education under the Education Commission	Thae Hyong-chol	태형철	9 April 2014	11 April 2019	5 years and 2 days	New	Not
35	Minister of Public Health	Kang Ha-guk	강하국	9 April 2014	11 April 2019	5 years and 2 days	New	Not
36	Minister of Culture	Pak Chun-nam	박춘남	9 April 2014	11 April 2019	5 years and 2 days	New	Reelected
37	Minister of Physical Culture and Sports	Ri Jong-mu	리종무	9 April 2014	11 April 2019	5 years and 2 days	New	Not
38	President of the Central Bank	Kim Chon-gyun	김천균	9 April 2014	11 April 2019	5 years and 2 days	New	Reelected
39	President of the Central Bureau of Statistics	Ri Sung-ho	리성호	9 April 2014	11 April 2019	5 years and 2 days	New	Not
40	Secretary-General of the Cabinet	Kim Yong-ho	김용호	9 April 2014	11 April 2019	5 years and 2 days	Old	Reelected
