= Kim Man-su (politician) =

North Korean politician (born 1956)

Minister of Electric Power Industry

14th term
- Incumbent
- Assumed office 11 April 2019
- President: Kim Jong Un
- Premier: Kim Tok-hun; Kim Jae-ryong
- Succeeded by: Kim Yu-il

13th term
- In office 9 April 2014 – 11 April 2019
- Chairman: Kim Jong Un
- Premier: Pak Pong-ju

12th term
- In office 14 April 2012 – 9 April 2014
- Chairman: Kim Jong Un
- Premier: Pak Pong-ju; Choe Yong-rim
- Preceded by: Ho Thaek

Personal details
- Born: 14 September 1956 (age 69) North Hamgyong Province
- Citizenship: North Korean
- Party: Workers' Party of Korea
- Occupation: Politician

Kim Man-su (Korean: 김만수; September 14, 1956) is a politician of North Korea. He is also a member of the Minister of Electric Power Industry in the Cabinet of North Korea as well as member of the Central Committee of the Workers' Party of Korea.

== Biography ==
He was born on September 14, 1956, in North Hamgyong Province. He has been the Minister of Electric Power Industry as a successor since April 2012. In May 2016, in the 7th Congress of the Workers' Party of Korea he was appointed a member of the Central Committee of the Workers 'Party. In March 2014, he was elected to the 13th convocation of the Supreme People's Assembly.
