= Choe Yong-gon (vice-premier) =

North Korean politician (1951–2015)

- 최영건
- Choe in 2004

Vice Premier of North Korea
- In office 2014–2015
- Premier: Pak Pong-ju
- Leader: Kim Jong Un

Personal details
- Born: 11 December 1951 Chonnae County, Kangwon Province, North Korea
- Died: May 2015 (aged 63) Pyongyang, North Korea
- Cause of death: Execution
- Citizenship: North Korean
- Known for: North Korean politician

Korean name
- Hangul: 최영건
- Hanja: 崔英健
- RR: Choe Yeonggeon
- MR: Ch'oe Yŏnggŏn

Choe Yong-gon (Korean: 최영건; 11 December 1951 – May 2015) was one of the vice-premiers of North Korea and deputy minister of construction and building material industries. He appears to have disappeared from public life after December 2014. In August 2015, South Korea's Yonhap News Agency reported that, according to a "source who demanded anonymity", he is believed to have been executed in May 2015 after opposing the policies of North Korea's leader Kim Jong Un on forestry.
