= Tong Jong-ho =

North Korean politician

Vice Premier of North Korea

14th term
- In office 11 April 2019 – 18 January 2021
- President: Kim Jong Un
- Premier: Kim Tok-hun; Kim Jae-ryong

Minister of Construction and Building-Materials Industries

13th term
- In office 9 April 2014 – 11 April 2019
- Chairman: Kim Jong Un
- Premier: Pak Pong-ju
- Succeeded by: Pak Hun

12th term
- In office 9 April 2009 – 9 April 2014
- Chairman: Kim Jong Un; Kim Jong Il
- Premier: Pak Pong-ju; Choe Yong-rim; Kim Yong-il
- Preceded by: Jo Yun-hui

Personal details
- Born: 1956 (age 69–70) Nampo, South Pyongan Province, North Korea
- Citizenship: North Korean
- Party: Workers' Party of Korea
- Occupation: Politician

Tong Jong-ho (Korean: 동정호, born 1956) is a North Korean politician. He is Vice Premier of North Korea in the North Korean Cabinet. He previously served as Minister of Construction and Building Industry and the Political Bureau of the Central Committee of the Workers' Party of Korea. He was delegate to the 12th convocation of the Supreme People's Assembly. He is a permanent chairman of the Korean Marathon Association.

== Biography ==
In August 2003, he was head of the department of Science and Technology of the Ministry of Construction. Since April 2014 until April 2019, he served as Minister of construction and building materials industries. Since April 2005, he has been a permanent chairman of the Korea Marathon Association. In September 2010, he was elected a candidate member of the Central Committee of the Workers' Party of Korea. In April 2009, he was elected as delegate to the 12th convocation of the Supreme People's Assembly. He was appointed the Vice Premier in May 2017. When Kim Jong Il died in 2011, he was a member of his funeral committee.
