= Kim Il-dae =

North Korean politician (1932–1983)

- 김일대

WPK Central Committee member
- Supreme Leader: Kim Il Sung

Personal details
- Born: June 7, 1932 South Hamgyong Province
- Died: September 25, 1983 (aged 51)
- Citizenship: North Korean
- Party: Workers' Party of Korea
- Education: Mangyongdae Revolutionary School

Military service
- Allegiance: North Korea

Kim Il-dae (Korean: 김일대; June 7, 1932 – September 25, 1983) was a North Korean chemist and politician.

== Biography ==
Born on June 7, 1932, in Gaeung-ri, Tanchon, South Hamgyong Province. In August 1949, after entering the Mangyongdae Revolutionary School, he enlisted in the Korean People's Army and served as a military officer. In October 1952, he went to Eastern Europe to study chemistry. After graduating, he returned home and was placed in the Institute of Chemistry of the Academy of Sciences of the Democratic People's Republic of Korea in 1957. He went back to study in 1958 and received a doctorate degree in 1962 and returned to Korea. After that, he worked as an engineer at Hamhung Chemical Plant.

In 1969, he served as Director in the Academy of Sciences, and in October 1976, he succeeded Kim Seok-ki as the Director of Higher Education committee. In December 1977, he was elected to the 6th Supreme People's Assembly and served as the Chairman of the Education Committee of the Politburo. In October 1979, he traveled to Somalia as the leader of North Korean delegation, and in April 1980 Mali, and May 1980, to Benin, Angola, and Togo as the head of the education delegation. In July 1980, he toured South Yemen, Rwanda and Burundi, and in August 1980 he visited Libya and Iraq. In October 1980, he was elected a member of the 6th Central Committee at the 6th Party Congress. In March 1981, he was appointed party director in charge of science education.

He wrote ideological essays, among them regarding the influence of the Juche ideology on the cultivation of revolutionary communist talent.

In March 1982, he visited the 5th Congress of the Communist Party of Vietnam with a delegation of the Workers' Party of Korea. In February 1982, he was re-elected to the 7th Supreme People's Assembly and in April was awarded the Order of Kim Il Sung in commemoration of Kim Il Sung's 70th birthday. He attended the Congress of the Socialist People's Party of Denmark in April 1982 as the delegation leader of the Workers' Party of Korea, and in March 1983 was appointed Director of Science Committee. In April 1983, he was elected as a member of the Standing Committee of the Supreme People's Assembly. He died on September 25, 1983, at the age of 51 at 13:00. Kim Il Sung sent his condolences and wreath. The funeral committee included Kang Song-san, Kim Hwan, Jong Jun-gi, Hwang Jang-yop, Kim Kuk-thae, Kim Si-hak, Kim Nam-yoon, Pak Song-bong, Yang Hyong-sop, Ri Yong-ik, Choe Jae-u, Choe Thae-bok, Pak Myong-chol, Kim Eung-sam, Ri Sung-gi, Kim Song-ryong, Joo Seung-seop and Choi Dong-geun.

== Bibliography ==
- Suh, Dae-sook (1981). Korean Communism 1945–1980: A Reference Guide to the Political System (1st ed.). University Press of Hawaii. ISBN 0-8248-0740-5.
