= Kim In-sik (politician) =

North Korean politician

- 김인식

Vice Premier of North Korea
- In office April 13, 2012 – April 9, 2014
- Premier: Choe Yong-rim (2010–2013); Pak Pong-ju (2013–2019)

Chairman of the Capital Construction Committee
- In office April 13, 2012 – April 9, 2014
- Premier: Choe Yong-rim (2010–2013); Pak Pong-ju (2013–2019)

Member of the Central Committee of the Workers' Party of Korea
- In office September 28, 2010 – May 9, 2016
- Leader: Kim Jong il (1997–2011); Kim Jong Un (2012-)

Deputy Director General of Capital Construction Bureau
- In office 1991 – April 13, 2012

Personal details
- Born: North Korea
- Citizenship: North Korean
- Political party: Workers' Party of Korea

Kim In-sik (Korean: 김인식) is a politician from North Korea. He served as Vice Premier of North Korea, Chairman of the Capital Construction Committee, and member of the Central Committee of the Workers' Party of Korea.

== Career ==
His place and date of birth are unknown. He graduated from Kimchaek University of Technology, and was subsequently appointed deputy director of the General Bureau of Capital Construction in 1991. He was elected as a member of the Central Committee of the Workers' Party of Korea at the 3rd Party Representative Meeting of the Workers' Party of Korea held on September 28, 2010. When Kim Jong Il died on December 17, 2011, he was elected as a member of the National Funeral Commission.

At the 5th Session of the 12th Supreme People's Assembly held on April 13, 2012, he was appointed Deputy Prime Minister of the Cabinet and Chairman of the Capital Construction Commission. He was not elected as a delegate to the 13th Supreme People's Assembly on March 9, 2014, and was dismissed as Vice Premier of North Korea and Chairman of the Capital Construction Committee in April of the same year.

Government offices
New title	Chairman of the Capital Construction Committee; 2012 – 2014	Succeeded by Zhao Seokho
