= Kang Chol-gu =

North Korean politician

Minister of Shipbuilding

14th term
- In office 11 April 2019 – Incumbent
- President: Kim Jong Un
- Premier: Kim Tok-hun; Kim Jae-ryong
- Preceded by: Post established

Personal details
- Citizenship: North Korean
- Party: Workers' Party of Korea

Kang Chol-gu (Korean: 강철구) is a politician of North Korea. He is also a candidate member of the Central Committee of the Workers' Party of Korea as well as Minister of Shipbuilding Industry in the Cabinet of North Korea.

== Biography ==
In 2019, he was appointed to head the Ministry of Shipping and Industry in the Cabinet of North Korea headed by Premier, Kim Jae-ryong. In April 2019, it was elected as a candidate for the Central Committee of the Workers 'Party of Korea at the 4th Plenum of the 7th Party of the Workers' Party. In March 2019, he was elected to the 14th convocation of the Supreme People's Assembly representing district 521.
