= Ri Chol-man =

North Korean politician

- 리철만

Minister of Agriculture

13th term
- In office 9 April 2014 – 17 May 2016
- Chairman: Kim Jong Un
- Premier: Pak Pong-ju
- Succeeded by: Ko In-ho

12th term
- In office 1 April 2013 – 9 April 2014
- Chairman: Kim Jong Un
- Premier: Pak Pong-ju
- Preceded by: Kim Chang-sik

Personal details
- Born: 1968 (age 57–58)
- Citizenship: North Korean
- Party: Workers' Party of Korea

Ri Chol-man (Korean: 리철만; born 1968) is a politician of North Korea. He is a member of the Central Committee of the Workers' Party of Korea and Chairman of the Party Committee of South Hwanghae Province since April 2019.

== Biography ==
Born in 1968. In 2005, he became Vice-Chairman of the North Pyongan Province Rural Accounting Committee and was promoted to Chairman in July 2010. In 2009, he was elected to the 12th convocation of the Supreme People's Assembly. In April 2013, he was appointed the Vice Premier of the Cabinet and Agriculture Minister. In May 2016 he was appointed to the WPK Agriculture Department secretary until April 2019, when he was appointed to the Secretary of the WPK South Hwanghae Provincial Committee. replacing Pak Yong-ho.
