= Ministry of Foreign Affairs (North Korea) =

North Korean government ministry

Ministry of Foreign Affairs of the Democratic People's Republic of Korea
- 외무성

Agency overview
- Formed: September 9, 1948
- Type: Government Ministry
- Jurisdiction: Government of North Korea
- Headquarters: Pyongyang, North Korea
- Minister responsible: Choe Son-hui, Minister of Foreign Affairs
- Parent agency: Cabinet
- Child agency: Diplomatic missions of North Korea
- Website: www.mfa.gov.kp

Korean name
- Hangul: 외무성
- Hanja: 外務省
- RR: Oemuseong
- MR: Oemusŏng

The Ministry of Foreign Affairs of the Democratic People's Republic of Korea is the government ministry of North Korea, responsible for conducting foreign relations of the country. The Minister of Foreign Affairs is in charge of the ministry.

== History ==
The Ministry was established in 1948.

In May 2024, after Kim Jong Un called for large changes in North Korea's reunification policy, Daily NK reported that the Ministry was given responsibilities for handling relations with South Korea, taking those responsibilities from the United Front Department.

== Organization ==
In addition to the foreign minister, the Ministry of Foreign Affairs has a first vice minister and seven other vice ministers. The current First Vice Minister is Kim Kye-gwan. The other vice ministers include Han Song-ryol,, Choe Hui-chol, and Kim Son Gyong.

The Ministry includes the following organization:

=== Internal organization ===
- Asia Affairs Department 1: Oversees China and Japan
- Asia Affairs Department 2: Oversees Mongolia, Vietnam, Myanmar, Thailand, the Philippines, Laos, Malaysia, Cambodia, Singapore, Brunei, Nepal, Iran, India, Pakistan, Bangladesh, the Maldives, Sri Lanka, Afghanistan, Indonesia, East Timor, Australia, New Zealand, Fiji, Papua New Guinea, Nauru and Vanuatu, the Association of Southeast Asian Nations (ASEAN), and the South Asian Association for Regional Cooperation (SAARC).
- European Affairs Department 1: Oversees Russia, Belarus, Kazakhstan, Kyrgyzstan, Uzbekistan, Azerbaijan, Armenia, Tajikistan, Moldova, Turkmenistan, Ukraine and Georgia
- European Affairs Department 2: Oversees Germany, Italy, France, Spain, United Kingdom, Austria, Switzerland, Liechtenstein, Sweden, Norway, Finland, Denmark, Ireland, Iceland, the Netherlands, Belgium, Luxembourg, Portugal, Greece, Turkey, Cyprus, San Marino, Vatican City, Monaco, Andorra, Poland, Czech Republic, Slovakia, Hungary, Romania, Bulgaria, Croatia, Serbia, Bosnia-Herzegovina, Slovenia, Albania, Montenegro, North Macedonia, Lithuania, Latvia and Estonia and is responsible for liaison with the European Council, the European Commission, the European External Action Service, and other EU headquarters.
- North American Affairs Department: Responsible for the United States and Canada
- African, Arab and Latin American Affairs Department: Responsible for Senegal, Guinea-Bissau, Cabo Verde, the Gambia, Burkina Faso, Uganda, Kenya, Burundi, Rwanda, Tanzania, DR Congo, Congo, Gabon, Cameroon, Central African Republic, Guinea, Liberia, Sierra Leone, Mali, Nigeria, Ghana, Benin, Togo, Chad, Niger, Cote d'Ivoire, South Africa, Zambia, Zimbabwe, Namibia, Mozambique, Botswana, Lesotho, Eswatini, Equatorial Guinea, Angola, Malawi, Madagascar, Mauritius, Seychelles, Comoros, Sao Tome and Principe, Algeria, Mauritania, Ethiopia, the Sudan, South Sudan, Somalia, Djibouti, Western Sahara, Libya, Tunisia, Morocco, Syria, Lebanon, Jordan, Iraq, Egypt, Yemen, Palestine, Israel, Kuwait, Qatar, Oman, Bahrain, United Arab Emirates, Saudi Arabia, Eritrea, Brazil, Chile, Colombia, Argentina, Uruguay, Paraguay, Peru, Guyana, Grenada, Saint Lucia, Bahamas, Belize, Jamaica, Trinidad and Tobago, Saint Kitts and Nevis, Saint Vincent and the Grenadines, Antigua Barbuda, Dominica, Dominican Republic, Suriname, Barbados, Haiti, Mexico, Nicaragua, El Salvador, Guatemala, Costa Rica, Honduras, Panama, Ecuador, Bolivia, Cuba, Venezuela, Puerto Rico
- Department of Press and Information
- Department of Consular Affairs
- Department of Treaty and Legal Affairs
- Protocol Department
- Department of International Organizations
- Department of Economic Cooperation

=== Directly affiliated institutions ===
- Institute for Disarmament and Peace
- Institute for American Studies
- Institute for Studies of Japan

=== Sponsored civil organizations ===
- Korea-China Association for Civil Exchange Promotion
- Korea-Canada Cooperation Association
- Korea-Japan Interchange Association
- Association for the Promotion of International Economic and Technological *Exchange
- Korea-Europe Association
- Korea-Asia Association
- Korea-Russia Association for Promotion of Exchange and Cooperation
- Korea-Africa Association
- Korea-Arab Association
- Korea-Latin America Association

== List of office holders ==
The following is a list of foreign ministers of North Korea since its founding in 1948:

No.	Portrait	Name (Birth–Death)	Term of office			Head of state	Premier
No.	Portrait	Name (Birth–Death)	Took office	Left office	Time in office	Head of state	Premier
1		Pak Hon-yong 박헌영 (1900–1955)	9 September 1948	3 March 1953	4 years, 5 months	Kim Tu-bong	Kim Il Sung
2		General; Nam Il 남일 (1915–1976)	3 March 1953	23 October 1959	6 years, 7 months	Kim Tu-bong; Choe Yong-gon	Kim Il Sung
3		Pak Song-chol 박성철 (1913–2008)	23 October 1959	1 July 1970	10 years, 8 months	Choe Yong-gon	Kim Il Sung
4		Ho Dam 허담 (1929–1991)	1 July 1970	1 December 1983	13 years, 5 months	Choe Yong-gon; Kim Il Sung	Kim Il Sung; Kim Il; Pak Song-chol; Ri Jong-ok
5		Kim Yong-nam 김영남 (1928–2025)	1 December 1983	5 September 1998	14 years, 9 months	Kim Il Sung; Office vacant	Ri Jong-ok; Kang Song-san; Ri Kun-mo; Yon Hyong-muk; Kang Song-san; Hong Song-nam (acting)
6		Paek Nam-sun 백남순 (1929–2007)	5 September 1998	2 January 2007	8 years, 3 months	Kim Yong-nam	Hong Song-nam; Pak Pong-ju
—		Kang Sok-ju 강석주 (1939–2016); Acting	3 January 2007	18 May 2007	4 months	Kim Yong-nam	Pak Pong-ju; Kim Yong-il
7		Pak Ui-chun 박의춘 (born 1932)	18 May 2007	9 April 2014	6 years, 10 months	Kim Yong-nam; Kim Jong Il; Office vacant Kim Jong Un	Kim Yong-il; Choe Yong-rim; Pak Pong-ju
8		Ri Su-yong 리수용 (born 1940)	9 April 2014	9 May 2016	2 years, 1 month	Kim Jong Un	Pak Pong-ju
9		Ri Yong-ho 리용호 (born 1956)	13 May 2016	18 January 2020	3 years, 8 months	Kim Jong Un	Pak Pong-ju; Kim Jae-ryong
10		Ri Son-gwon 리선권	21 January 2020	11 June 2022	2 years, 141 days	Kim Jong Un	Kim Jae-ryong; Kim Tok-hun
11		Choe Son-hui 최선희 (born 1964)	11 June 2022	Incumbent	4 years, 79 days	Kim Jong Un	Kim Tok-hun; Pak Thae-song

== See also ==
- List of diplomatic missions of North Korea
- List of diplomatic missions in North Korea
- Ministry of Foreign Affairs (South Korea)
