= Jon Hyon-chol =

North Korean politician

- 전현철

Member of the Politburo of the WPK Central Committee
- President: Kim Jong Un

Head of the Economic Policy Office of the Workers' Party of Korea CC
- Leader: Kim Jong Un

Vice Premier of North Korea
- In office 17 January 2020 – 8 June 2021
- President: Choe Ryong-hae
- Premier: Kim Tok-hun

Personal details
- Born: North Korea
- Citizenship: North Korean
- Party: Workers' Party of Korea

Korean name
- Hangul: 전현철
- RR: Jeon Hyeoncheol
- MR: Chŏn Hyŏnch'ŏl

Jon Hyon-chol (Korean: 전현철) is a North Korean politician. He served as a Vice Premier of the Cabinet a candidate (alternate) member of the Politburo of the Central Committee of the Workers' Party of Korea as well as head of the Economic Policy Office of the Central Committee.

== Biography ==
He was elected by-election as a member of the Central Committee of the Workers' Party of Korea at the 5th Plenum of the 7th Central Committee of the Workers' Party of Korea, which was held from December 28, 2019.

He was elected as a member of the Party Central Committee at the 8th Congress of the Workers' Party of Korea held from January 5, 2021, and at the 1st plenary session of the 8th Party Central Committee held on January 10. He was elected as alternate (non-voting) member of the Political Bureau of the Central Committee. At this party congress, he was also appointed head of the economic policy office of the Party Central Committee. He was appointed Vice Premier at the 4th Session of the 14th convocation of the Supreme People's Assembly held on 17 January of the same year. He held that position until 8 June 2022. At the same date he was appointed a full (voting) member of the Politburo.
