= Ro Thae-sok =

- 로태석

Vice Premier of North Korea
- Prime Minister: Ri Jong-ok
- Supreme Leader: Kim Il Sung

Personal details
- Born: 25 August 1919 Miryang, Keishōnan-dō, Korea, Empire of Japan
- Died: 31 December 1979 (aged 60)
- Citizenship: North Korean
- Party: Workers' Party of Korea

Ro Thae-sok (Korean: 로태석; 25 August 1919 - 31 December 1979) was a North Korean politician who served in various positions in the North Korean Cabinet and as Vice Premier of North Korea.

== Biography ==
He was born on August 25, 1919, into a working-class family in Miryang, Keishōnan-dō, Korea, Empire of Japan (now in South Gyeongsang Province, South Korea). He graduated from the Public Commercial School in Daegu.

After the liberation of Korea, he defected to North Korea and worked at the Hungnam Fertilizer Factory. In January 1964, he graduated from the Central Party School and was again appointed vice-chairman of the National Planning Commission. In November 1970, he was promoted to member of the Central Committee at the 5th Party Congress. In December 1972, he was elected as a delegate to the 5th Supreme People's Assembly and remained as chairman of the Local Industrial Committee of the Political Council. In November 1976, he was by-elected as a member of the Central People's Committee, and in December 1977, he was re-elected as a deputy to the 6th Supreme People's Assembly and a member of the Central People's Committee. In August 1978, he was appointed Deputy Prime Minister of the Political Affairs Council, and in November 1978, he was by-elected as a candidate member of the 5th Political Committee at the 17th Plenary Session of the 5th Central Committee. In August 1978 he was appointed as Vice Premier and Chairman of the National Planning Commission. He died in a car accident on December 31, 1979 at the age of 60.
