= Jong Il-ryong =

North Korean politician (1912–1978)

- 정일룡

Government minister
- Supreme Leader: Kim Il Sung

Personal details
- Born: July 3, 1912 Kumya County, Kankyōnan Province (South Hamgyong Province), Korea, Empire of Japan
- Died: January 14, 1978 (aged 65)
- Party: Workers' Party of Korea

Jong Il-ryong (Korean: 정일룡) was a North Korean politician who served as a minister in the North Korean cabinet.

== Biography ==
He was born on July 3, 1912, in Kumya County, Kankyōnan Province (South Hamgyong Province), Korea, Empire of Japan. He started working at the Munpyong smelter in 1937 while farming, and also worked as a blast furnace worker at the Hungnam smelter. After liberation, he became a member of the Munpyong smelter management committee and worked to restore the duke, and on October 14, 1945, he succeeded in producing iron again at the Munpyong smelter. In recognition of this contribution, in October 1946, he became the manager of the Munpyong smelter, and in September 1947, he was appointed as the deputy director of the Industrial Bureau of the North Korean People's Committee in recognition of his contribution to exceeding the 1947 People's Economic Plan before August.

After studying at the Central Advanced Management School (Korean: 인민경제대학) he was elected a member of the Central Committee and a member of the Standing Committee at the 2nd Party Congress in March 1948. In August 1948, he was elected to the 1st convocation of the Supreme People's Assembly. When the cabinet took office in September, he was appointed Minister of Industry. He attended the first and second session of the SPA held between January 28 and February 1, 1949. In June 1949, the Standing Committee was abolished as the North and South Labor Party merged, and he lost his position as a Standing Committee member.

After the sudden death of Kim Chaek, the Vice Premier and Minister of Industry in February 1951, he was promoted as successor to Industry Minister on February 6 according to the decree of the Presidium of the Supreme People's Assembly. In August 1957, he was re-elected as a deputy to the 2nd convocation Supreme People's Assembly, and in September, at the 1st meeting of the 2nd Supreme People's Assembly, he was elected as vice-chairman of the Cabinet and the Machinery Industry Minister. In October 1966, he was reported to have been dismissed from the political committee at the 2nd Conference of the Workers' Party of Korea. In November 1967, he was elected as a deputy of the 4th Supreme People's Assembly.

In September 1958, he was awarded the 1st Class Order of the National Flag. He died on January 14, 1978, and was buried at the Patriotic Cemetery.
