= Ri Song-hak =

North Korean politician

Minister of Machine Building Industry of the Workers' Party of Korea
- In office April 2020 – 18 January 2021
- Leader: Kim Jong Un

Vice Premier of North Korea
- Incumbent
- Assumed office 18 January 2021
- President: Choe Ryong-hae
- Premier: Kim Tok-hun

Personal details
- Born: North Korea
- Citizenship: North Korean
- Party: Workers' Party of Korea

Ri Song-hak (Korean: 리성학) is a politician of North Korea. He serves as the Vice Premier of North Korea and a member of the Central Committee of the Workers' Party of Korea.

== Career ==
In April 2020, he was elected as a candidate member of the Central Committee of the Workers' Party of Korea at the Political Bureau meeting of the Central Committee. Two days later, at the Third Plenary Meeting of the 14th Supreme People's Assembly, he was appointed the Minister of Machine Building Industry, succeeding Choe Il-ryong. In January 2021, he participated as a speaker in the Central Committee of the Workers' Party of Korea's Business Conference at the 8th Party Congress and was elected as a member of the Central Committee. One week later, at the Fourth Plenary Meeting of the 14th Supreme People's Assembly, he stepped down from the Ministry of Machine Building Industry and was appointed the Vice Premier.

== Other notes ==
In July 2014, he served as a member of the State Funeral Committee upon the death of Jeon Byeong-ho.
