= Ri Mu-yong =

North Korean politician

Minister of Chemical Industry

13th term
- In office 9 April 2014 – 11 April 2017
- Chairman: Kim Jong Un
- Premier: Pak Pong-ju
- Succeeded by: Jang Kil-ryong

12th term
- In office 9 April 2014 – 9 April 2009
- Chairman: Kim Jong Un; Kim Jong Il
- Premier: Pak Pong-ju; Choe Yong-rim; Kim Yong-il

11th term
- In office 3 September 2003 – 9 April 2009
- Chairman: Kim Jong Il
- Premier: Kim Yong-il; Pak Pong-ju
- Preceded by: Pak Pong-ju

Personal details
- Born: 8 April 1948 (age 78) Nampo, South Pyongan Province, northern Korea
- Citizenship: North Korean
- Party: Workers' Party of Korea
- Education: Kim Chaek University of Technology

Ri Mu-yong (Korean: 리무영) is a North Korean politician and administrator. He served as Vice Premier and Minister of Chemical Industry in the Cabinet of North Korea.

== Biography ==
He was born on April 8, 1948. During the 1990s to 2003 he served as director of the Namhung Youth Chemical Complex in Anju, South Pyongan Province. In 1998 he was elected to the 10th convocation of the Supreme People's Assembly (SPA), representing the 119th electoral district. In 2003 he was elected to the 11th convocation of the SPA, and appointed to Minister of Chemical Industry, replacing Pak Pong-ju who became Premier of North Korea. He served in that position until April 2017, when he was replaced by Jang Kil-ryong. During the 3rd Party Conference he was elected a full member of the Central Committee of the WPK. He was again elected also a full member of the 7th Central Committee following the 7th WPK Congress held in 2016. He was member of the funeral committee of Jo Myong-rok in 2010, Ri Ul-sol in 2015 and of Kim Yang-gon in 2015.
