= Kim Pong-chol =

North Korean politician (1942–2012)

Korean name
- Hangul: 김봉철
- Hanja: 金奉哲
- RR: Gim Bongcheol
- MR: Kim Pongch'ŏl

Kim Pong-chol (김봉철, 2 May 1942 – 14 February 2012) was a North Korean politician. His last known job was Minister of Commerce.

== Career ==
In August 1994, he was named vice-minister of commerce, and was promoted to minister of commerce in September 1998. At that time, these positions were under the Politburo (정무원). However, the 1998 Constitution of North Korea eliminated these positions. In October 1998 he was transferred to the position of vice-chairman of the central committee of the China–North Korea Friendship Association. In July 2001, he became vice-director of the Pyongyang People's Service Commission (인민봉사총국), and was promoted to director in August 2002. In February 2007 he was named vice-minister of the Cabinet Secretariat (내각사무국). In 2008, he was again named Minister of Commerce. In October 2008, he also served as a member of the funeral committee for Pak Song-chol. In April 2009, he was named a member of the 12th Committee of the Supreme People's Assembly, while retaining his position as Minister of Commerce. He accompanied Choe Yong-rim on his visit to China in September 2011.

== Death ==
Kim was reported to have died in a helicopter crash on Sundo Island, Cholsan County, North Pyongan Province. He was on his way to deliver gifts to local residents in honour of the late Kim Jong Il's birthday. However, during landing, the tail of the helicopter struck a rock, leading to the crash. A television crew was able to escape from the wreckage, but Kim did not and was caught in the ensuing explosion.
