= Ro Tu-chol =

North Korean politician

- 로두철

Chairman of the State Planning Commission

14th term
- In office 11 April 2019 – 11 January 2020
- Chairman: Kim Jong Un
- Premier: Kim Jae-ryong
- Succeeded by: Kim Il-chol

13th term
- In office 9 April 2014 – 11 April 2019
- Chairman: Kim Jong Un
- Premier: Pak Pong-ju

12th term
- In office 9 April 2009 – 9 April 2014
- Chairman: Kim Jong Un
- Premier: Pak Pong-ju; Choe Yong-rim; Kim Yong-il
- Preceded by: Kim Kwang-rin

Personal details
- Born: 2 October 1950 (age 75) Hamhung, South Hamgyong Province, North Korea
- Party: Workers' Party of Korea

Ro Tu-chol (로두철, born 2 October 1950) is a Vice Premier of North Korea's cabinet and the Chairman of the State Planning Commission. During Russian Deputy Prime Minister Yuri Trutnev's three-day visit to Pyongyang in May 2014, Ro negotiated on North Korea's behalf and signed a mutual cooperation agreement with Moscow.
