= Kim Yong-jin (politician) =

North Korean politician

- 김용진

Vice Premier of North Korea

13th term
- In office 9 April 2014 – July 2016
- Chairman: Kim Jong Un
- Premier: Pak Pong-ju; Choe Yong-rim

Personal details
- Born: 23 February 1953
- Died: July 2016 (aged 63) Pyongyang, North Korea
- Cause of death: Execution
- Party: Workers' Party of Korea

Kim Yong-jin (Korean: 김용진; 23 February 1953 – July 2016) was a senior North Korean official. Kim served as North Korea's education minister, and in 2012 was made a vice-premier.

== Execution ==
In August 2016, it was reported that he had been executed by firing squad for allegedly displaying a bad attitude at a national meeting and failing to stand upright. Kim was subsequently branded an "anti-party and a counter-revolutionary member" by North Korea's State Security. The information was confirmed by South Korea's Unification Ministry spokesman, Jeong Joon Hee.
