= Kang Min-chol =

North Korean politician (born 1948)

- 강민철 (姜民哲)
- Born: 1948 (age 77–78)
- Education: Kim Chaek University of Technology
- Occupations: politician, industrial official, alternate member of WPK central committee, delegate to 12th Supreme People's Assembly

Kang Min-chol (Korean: 강민철; born 1948) is a North Korean politician. He is Minister of Mining Industries in the Cabinet of North Korea, and an alternate member of the politburo of the Central Committee of the Workers' Party of Korea (WPK). He was a delegate to the 12th session of the Supreme People's Assembly.

== Career ==
Kang was born in 1948, and attended the Kim Chaek University of Technology. In October 1988, he became deputy-chair of the WPK organizational committee of the Musan Mining Complex in North Hamgyong Province, and in January 2001, he was appointed chief secretary of the Musan County WPK. He served as Chief Secretary of the WPK for Musan Mining Complex starting in October 2003, and since November 2005, he has been the Minister of Mining Industry in the Cabinet of North Korea. In September 2010, he was appointed an alternate member of the Central Committee of the Workers' Party of Korea.

Kang served as a member of the national mourning committee upon the death of Kim Jong Il in 2011.

== Delegate to Supreme People's Assembly ==
Kang was elected to the 12th session of the Supreme People's Assembly in April 2009, from the 410th Constituency. He was re-confirmed as Minister of Mining in the same session.

Preceded by Ri Kwang Nam	Minister of Mining Industry of the Cabinet of North Korea; November 2005 –	Succeeded by Current
