= Pak Hun =

North Korean politician

- 박훈

Member of the Politburo of the Central Committee of the WPK
- Incumbent
- Assumed office 2026

Vice Premier of North Korea
- In office 17 January 2021 – 24 December 2024
- Incumbent
- Assumed office 22 March 2026

Minister of Construction and Building-Materials Industry
- In office 11 April 2019 – 18 January 2021

Personal details
- Party: Workers' Party of Korea
- Awards: Order of the National Flag

Pak Hun (Korean: 박훈) is a North Korean politician who is serving as a member of the Politburo of the Workers' Party of Korea and a minister in the Cabinet of North Korea.

== Biography ==
On April 20, 2018, he was elected as an alternate member of the Central Committee of the Workers' Party of Korea during the Third Plenary Meeting of the 7th Central Committee. In March 2019, he was re-elected as a deputy to the 14th convocation of the Supreme People's Assembly. On April 10, he participated as a speaker during the first agenda item at the 4th Plenary Meeting of the 7th Central Committee of the Workers' Party of Korea and was promoted to a member of the Party Central Committee. On April 11, he was retained as the Minister of Construction and Building-Materials Industry at the first session of the 14th Supreme People's Assembly. In December 2019, he attended the 5th Plenary Meeting of the 7th Central Committee of the WPK.

On January 17, 2021, at the 4th session of the 14th Supreme People's Assembly, he was promoted to Vice Premier of the Cabinet in charge of construction and also became a member of the 8th Central Committee.

On February 22, 2026, he returned as a member of the 9th Central Committee at the 9th Congress, and on February 23, he was elected as an alternate member of the 9th Politburo during the Enlarged First Plenary Meeting of the 9th Central Committee. On March 22, he was reappointed as a Vice Premier of the 15th Cabinet at the First Session of the 15th convocation of the Supreme People's Assembly.

He was awarded the Order of the National Flag, First Class, by Yang Hyong-sop on December 10, 2018.
