= Hong Song-nam =

North Korean politician (1929–2009)

- 홍성남

8th Premier of North Korea
- In office 5 September 1998 – 3 September 2003; Acting: 21 February 1997 – 5 September 1998
- Leader: Kim Jong Il
- Preceded by: Kang Song-san
- Succeeded by: Pak Pong-ju

Personal details
- Born: 2 October 1929
- Died: 31 March 2009 (aged 79)

Korean name
- Hangul: 홍성남
- Hanja: 洪成南
- RR: Hong Seongnam
- MR: Hong Sŏngnam

Hong Song-nam (Korean: 홍성남; 2 October 1929 – 31 March 2009) was a North Korean politician who was the Premier of North Korea from 1998 to 2003. He succeeded Kang Song-san. Born in Kangwon Province, he graduated from the Kim Il Sung University and studied electrical engineering at the Prague Technical Institute.

From 1954 he worked in the North Korean Ministry of Heavy Industry. In 1971–1973 he was Minister of Heavy Industry. From 1973 to 1975 he was Deputy Chairman of the Administrative Council of the DPRK. In 1973–1977 he was Chairman of the State Planning Commission. From 1982 to 1986 he was First Secretary of the Workers' Party of Korea of South Pyongan Province. In 1987–1990 he served as Deputy Chairman of the Administrative Council, the chairman of the State Planning Commission of the DPRK. From 1990 to 1998 he was deputy chairman of the Administrative Council (Vice Premier of North Korea).

Hong died on 31 March 2009. A funeral committee chaired by Kim Yong-nam was appointed with Jo Myong-rok, Kim Yong-chun, and 33 others as its members.

== Works ==
- Hong Song-nam (March 1988). "To Expand and Strengthen the Production-Technology Foundations of Key Industries Is an Important Economic Construction Task in the Coming Year" (PDF). Kulloja. OCLC 9516938. Archived from the original (PDF) on 2022-10-05.
- — (September 1988). "Our Republic Is a Self-Reliant, Self-Supporting, and Self-Defending Socialist Power Which Brilliantly Embodies the Chuche Idea in All Fields of State Activity" (PDF). Kulloja. OCLC 9516938. Archived from the original (PDF) on 2022-10-05.

== See also ==
- Politics of North Korea
