= Nam Il =

North Korean army officer (1915–1976)

Army General Nam Il
- 남일
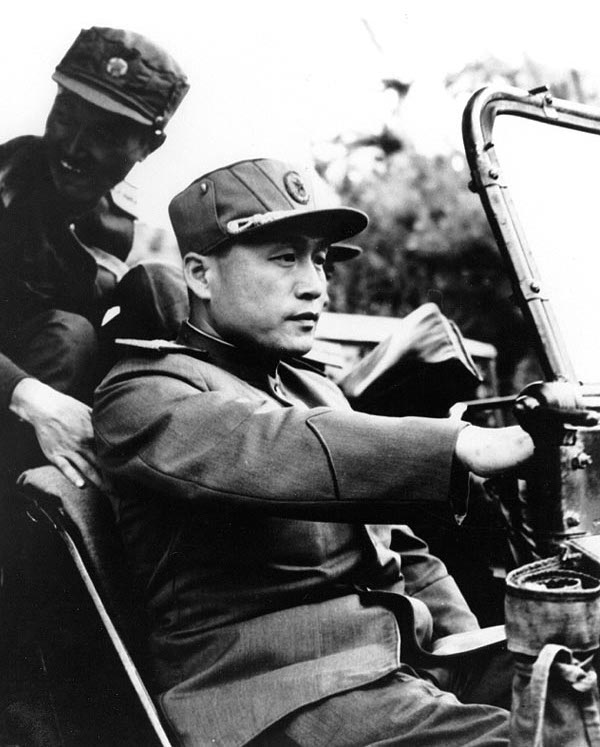
- Nam Il waiting to depart from the Korean War Armistice Negotiations site at Kaesong, Korea. August 1, 1951. The identification is probably erroneous, and the figure appears to be Ri Sang-jo rather than Nam Il.

Vice Premier of the Cabinet
- In office 20 September 1957 – 7 March 1976 Serving with 16 other officeholders: Kim Il; Hong Myong-hui; Chong Il-yong; Pak Ui-wan; Chong Chun-taek; Yi Chu-yon; Ri Jong-ok; Kim Kwang-hyop; Kim Chang-man; Choe Yong-jin; Ko Hyok; Pak Song-chol; Kim Chang-bong; Kim Man-gum; Choe Chae-u; Hong Won-gil
- Premier: Kim Il; Kim Il Sung

Chairman of the Light Industry Commission
- In office 26 December 1972 – 7 March 1976
- Premier: Kim Il
- Preceded by: Post established
- Succeeded by: Ho Sun

Chairman of the State Construction Commission
- In office August 1960 – December 1962
- Premier: Kim Il Sung
- Preceded by: Kim Ung-sang
- Succeeded by: Kim Tu-sam

Minister of Foreign Affairs
- In office 3 March 1953 – 23 October 1959
- Premier: Kim Il Sung
- Preceded by: Pak Hon-yong
- Succeeded by: Pak Song-chol

Personal details
- Born: Yakov Petrovich Nam; 5 June 1915 Golubovka, Primorskaya Oblast, Russian Empire
- Died: 7 March 1976 (aged 60) Pyongyang, North Korea
- Resting place: Patriotic Martyrs' Cemetery, North Korea
- Relations: Nam Jong-son

Military service
- Allegiance: North Korea; Soviet Union
- Branch/service: Korean People's Army; Soviet Army
- Years of service: 1948–1976; 1940s
- Rank: Army General

Korean name
- Hangul: 남일
- Hanja: 南日
- RR: Nam Il
- MR: Nam Il

Nam Il (5 June 1913 – 7 March 1976) was a Russian-born North Korean military officer and co-signer of the Korean Armistice Agreement.

== Biography ==
Nam was born Yakov Petrovich Nam (Russian: Яков Петрович Нам) probably in the Russian Far East. Due to a Soviet policy, Nam's family, like many Koreans in Russia's Far East, were moved to Central Asia. He was educated at Smolensk Military School and in Tashkent. Nam achieved his final rank of Captain as an Assistant to the Division Chief of Staff of a Soviet Army division during World War II. He took part in some of the greatest battles, including Stalingrad and the Battle of Berlin.

When not serving in the military, he worked in the education sector. In 1946, he was sent to Soviet occupied North Korea, as a member of a contingent of ethnic Korean former Soviet military officers to assist Kim Il Sung, leaving behind a wife and daughter in Soviet Union. After the Korean war broke out in 1950 he was appointed Chief of Staff, replacing Kang Kon who had been killed in action. In 1953, Nam became a General of the Army (대장, three-star rank at the time). When the Korean War reached a stalemate in July 1951, Nam served as the Communists' chief delegate at the armistice talks. He was famous for using an amber cigarette holder.

After the war, Nam Il served as Minister of Foreign Affairs, in the North Korean government. Along with another Soviet Korean Pak Chong-ae, he worked to help Kim Il Sung break free from Soviet influence. In 1957, he was promoted and became one of several deputy Prime Ministers. Nam, along with Pang Hak-se (the founder of the DPRK secret police), was one of only a few prominent Soviet Koreans who survived the purges of the 1950s.

On 7 March 1976, it was announced that he had died when his car was crushed by a truck. Many suspected that this was not an accident, and some blamed Kim Jong Il, who by that time was not powerful enough to simply order that Nam be killed. Others said that it was done by Kim Il Sung. Nam Il's son, who lived in the Soviet Union, visited North Korea and attempted to investigate, but Pang Hak-se told him to go home and stop interfering in affairs which did not concern him.

Nam was awarded a state funeral and was buried in Revolutionary Martyrs' Cemetery. Unlike some of his colleagues who were purged, Nam continues to appear in historical photographs.

== Awards ==
- Order of Polonia Restituta, 2nd Class

== See also ==
- Koryo-saram, Koreans in the Soviet Union

== Citations ==
Political offices
Preceded by Pak Hon-yong	Foreign Minister of North Korea (DPRK); April 1953 – October 1959	Succeeded by Pak Song-chol
Military offices
Preceded by Kang Kon	Chief of the General Staff of the Korean People's Army; September 1950 – August 1953	Succeeded by Kim Kwang-hyop
