= Vice Premier of North Korea =

Political office in North Korea

The Vice Premier of the Cabinet assists the Premier of North Korea in guiding the work of the Cabinet of North Korea. The office is also alternatively known as Deputy Prime Minister of North Korea.

== Current vice premiers ==
Office Other portfolios	Name	Party
First Vice Premier	Kim Tok-hun (since 22 March 2026)	Workers' Party of Korea
Vice Premier; Chairman of the State Planning Commission	Pak Jong-gun (since 17 January 2021)	Workers' Party of Korea
Vice Premier	Jon Hyon-chol (since 22 March 2026)	Workers' Party of Korea
Vice Premier	Pak Hun (since 22 March 2026)	Workers' Party of Korea
Vice Premier	Ri Kyong-il (since 22 March 2026)	Workers' Party of Korea
Vice Premier	Kim Chang-sok (since 22 March 2026)	Workers' Party of Korea
Vice Premier	Jon Sung-guk (since 8 June 2022)	Workers' Party of Korea
Vice Premier; Chairman of the Agricultural Commission	Ri Chol-man (since 30 December 2023)	Workers' Party of Korea

== First vice premiers ==
=== Cabinet (1948–1972) ===
No.	Portrait	Name (Birth–Death)	Term of office		Party	Premier	SPA
No.	Portrait	Name (Birth–Death)	Took office	Left office	Party	Premier	SPA
1		Kim Il 김일 (1910–1984)	20 January 1959	28 December 1972	Workers' Party of Korea	Kim Il Sung	2nd
1		Kim Il 김일 (1910–1984)	20 January 1959	28 December 1972	Workers' Party of Korea	Kim Il Sung	3rd
1		Kim Il 김일 (1910–1984)	20 January 1959	28 December 1972	Workers' Party of Korea	Kim Il Sung	4th

=== Administration Council (1972–1998) ===
No.	Portrait	Name (Birth–Death)	Term of office		Party	Premier	SPA
No.	Portrait	Name (Birth–Death)	Took office	Left office	Party	Premier	SPA
2		Kang Song-san 강성산 (1931–2007)	6 April 1982	25 January 1984	Workers' Party of Korea	Ri Jong-ok	7th
None (25 January 1984 – 1 October 1985)						Kang Song-san	7th
3		Yon Hyong-muk 연형묵 (1931–2005)	1 October 1985	12 August 1986	Workers' Party of Korea	Kang Song-san	7th
4		Kim Yun-hyok 김윤혁 (1926–2006)	12 August 1986	29 December 1986	Workers' Party of Korea	Kang Song-san	7th
5		Hong Song-nam 홍성남 (1929–2009)	29 December 1986	14 October 1987	Workers' Party of Korea	Ri Kun-mo	8th

=== Cabinet (since 1998) ===
No.	Portrait	Name (Birth–Death)	Term of office		Party	Premier	SPA
No.	Portrait	Name (Birth–Death)	Took office	Left office	Party	Premier	SPA
6		Kim Tok-hun 김덕훈 (born 1961)	22 March 2026	Incumbent	Workers' Party of Korea	Pak Thae-song	15th

== Second vice premiers ==
=== Cabinet (1948–1972) ===
No.	Portrait	Name (Birth–Death)	Term of office		Party	Premier	SPA
No.	Portrait	Name (Birth–Death)	Took office	Left office	Party	Premier	SPA
1		Pak Song-chol 박성철 (1913–2008)	11 July 1970	28 December 1972	Workers' Party of Korea	Kim Il Sung	4th

== Vice premiers ==
=== Cabinet (1948–1972) ===
No.	Portrait	Name (Birth–Death)	Term of office		Party	Premier	SPA
No.	Portrait	Name (Birth–Death)	Took office	Left office	Party	Premier	SPA
1		Pak Hon-yong 박헌영 (1900–1955)	9 September 1948	31 March 1953	Workers' Party of South Korea (until 1949)	Kim Il Sung	1st
1		Pak Hon-yong 박헌영 (1900–1955)	9 September 1948	31 March 1953	Workers' Party of Korea (from 1949)	Kim Il Sung	1st
2		Hong Myong-hui 홍명희 (1888–1968)	9 September 1948	20 September 1957	Democratic Independent Party	Kim Il Sung	1st
3		Kim Chaek 김책 (1903–1951)	9 September 1948	31 January 1951	Workers' Party of North Korea (until 1949)	Kim Il Sung	1st
3		Kim Chaek 김책 (1903–1951)	9 September 1948	31 January 1951	Workers' Party of Korea (from 1949)	Kim Il Sung	1st
4		Ho Ka-i 허가이 (1908–1953)	2 November 1951	2 July 1953	Workers' Party of Korea	Kim Il Sung	1st
5		Choe Chang-ik 최창익 (1896–1960)	18 November 1952	31 August 1956	Workers' Party of Korea	Kim Il Sung	1st
6		Jong Il-ryong 정일룡 (1912–1978)	18 November 1952	11 May 1956	Workers' Party of Korea	Kim Il Sung	1st
7		Choe Yong-gon 최용건 (1900–1976)	4 July 1953	20 September 1957	Workers' Party of Korea	Kim Il Sung	1st
8		Pak Ui-wan 박의완 (1911–1961)	13 July 1953	20 September 1957	Workers' Party of Korea	Kim Il Sung	1st
9		Pak Chang-ok 박창옥 (1896–1960)	23 March 1954	31 August 1956	Workers' Party of Korea	Kim Il Sung	1st
10		Kim Il 김일 (1910–1984)	23 March 1954	20 September 1957	Workers' Party of Korea	Kim Il Sung	1st
11		Jong Jun-thaek 정준택 (1911–1973)	11 May 1956	20 September 1957	Workers' Party of Korea	Kim Il Sung	1st
(6)		Jong Il-ryong 정일룡 (1912–1978)	4 September 1956	20 September 1957	Workers' Party of Korea	Kim Il Sung	1st
(10)		Kim Il 김일 (1910–1984)	20 September 1957	20 January 1959	Workers' Party of Korea	Kim Il Sung	2nd
(2)		Hong Myong-hui 홍명희 (1888–1968)	20 September 1957	23 October 1962	Democratic Independent Party	Kim Il Sung	2nd
(11)		Jong Jun-thaek 정준택 (1911–1973)	20 September 1957	23 October 1962	Workers' Party of Korea	Kim Il Sung	2nd
12		Nam Il 남일 (1915–1976)	20 September 1957	23 October 1962	Workers' Party of Korea	Kim Il Sung	2nd
(8)		Pak Ui-wan 박의완 (1911–1961)	20 September 1957	8 March 1958	Workers' Party of Korea	Kim Il Sung	2nd
(6)		Jong Il-ryong 정일룡 (1912–1978)	20 September 1957	23 October 1962	Workers' Party of Korea	Kim Il Sung	2nd
13		Ri Ju-yon 리주연 (1904–1969)	8 March 1958	23 October 1962	Workers' Party of Korea	Kim Il Sung	2nd
14		Ri Jong-ok 리종옥 (1916–1999)	15 January 1960	23 October 1962	Workers' Party of Korea	Kim Il Sung	2nd
15		Kim Kwang-hyop 김광협 (1915–1970)	12 October 1960	23 October 1962	Workers' Party of Korea	Kim Il Sung	2nd
(15)		Kim Kwang-hyop 김광협 (1915–1970)	23 October 1962	16 December 1967	Workers' Party of Korea	Kim Il Sung	3rd
16		Kim Chang-man 김창만 (1907–1966)	23 October 1962	10 January 1966	Workers' Party of Korea	Kim Il Sung	3rd
(6)		Jong Il-ryong 정일룡 (1912–1978)	23 October 1962	4 December 1964	Workers' Party of Korea	Kim Il Sung	3rd
(12)		Nam Il 남일 (1915–1976)	23 October 1962	16 December 1967	Workers' Party of Korea	Kim Il Sung	3rd
(14)		Ri Jong-ok 리종옥 (1916–1999)	23 October 1962	16 December 1967	Workers' Party of Korea	Kim Il Sung	3rd
(13)		Ri Ju-yon 리주연 (1904–1969)	23 October 1962	16 December 1967	Workers' Party of Korea	Kim Il Sung	3rd
(11)		Jong Jun-thaek 정준택 (1911–1973)	16 December 1967	28 December 1972	Workers' Party of Korea	Kim Il Sung	3rd
17		Choe Yong-jin 최용진 (1911–1988)	4 July 1964	16 December 1967	Workers' Party of Korea	Kim Il Sung	3rd
18		Ko Hyok 고혁	30 September 1966	16 December 1967	Workers' Party of Korea	Kim Il Sung	3rd
19		Kim Chang-bong 김창봉 (1919–1969)	18 October 1966	16 December 1967	Workers' Party of Korea	Kim Il Sung	3rd
20		Pak Song-chol 박성철 (1913–2008)	18 October 1966	16 December 1967	Workers' Party of Korea	Kim Il Sung	3rd
(15)		Kim Kwang-hyop 김광협 (1915–1970)	16 December 1967	1970	Workers' Party of Korea	Kim Il Sung	4th
(20)		Pak Song-chol 박성철 (1913–2008)	16 December 1967	11 July 1970	Workers' Party of Korea	Kim Il Sung	4th
(19)		Kim Chang-bong 김창봉 (1919–1969)	16 December 1967	1969	Workers' Party of Korea	Kim Il Sung	4th
(13)		Ri Ju-yon 리주연 (1904–1969)	16 December 1967	20 August 1969	Workers' Party of Korea	Kim Il Sung	4th
(12)		Nam Il 남일 (1915–1976)	16 December 1967	28 December 1972	Workers' Party of Korea	Kim Il Sung	4th
(14)		Ri Jong-ok 리종옥 (1916–1999)	16 December 1967	6 July 1970	Workers' Party of Korea	Kim Il Sung	4th
(17)		Choe Yong-jin 최용진 (1911–1988)	16 December 1967	28 December 1972	Workers' Party of Korea	Kim Il Sung	4th
(11)		Jong Jun-thaek 정준택 (1911–1973)	16 December 1967	28 December 1972	Workers' Party of Korea	Kim Il Sung	4th
21		Kim Man-gum 김만금 (1911–1984)	11 July 1970	28 December 1972	Workers' Party of Korea	Kim Il Sung	4th
22		Choe Jae-u 최재우 (1913–2004)	25 March 1971	28 December 1972	Workers' Party of Korea	Kim Il Sung	4th

=== Administration Council (1972–1998) ===
No.	Portrait	Name (Birth–Death)	Term of office		Party	Premier	SPA
No.	Portrait	Name (Birth–Death)	Took office	Left office	Party	Premier	SPA
(11)		Jong Jun-thaek 정준택 (1911–1973)	28 December 1972	28 January 1973	Workers' Party of Korea	Kim Il (until 1976) Pak Song-chol (from 1976)	5th
(12)		Nam Il 남일 (1915–1976)	28 December 1972	7 March 1976	Workers' Party of Korea	Kim Il (until 1976) Pak Song-chol (from 1976)	5th
(20)		Pak Song-chol 박성철 (1913–2008)	28 December 1972	19 April 1976	Workers' Party of Korea	Kim Il (until 1976) Pak Song-chol (from 1976)	5th
(21)		Kim Man-gum 김만금 (1911–1984)	28 December 1972	September; 1973	Workers' Party of Korea	Kim Il (until 1976) Pak Song-chol (from 1976)	5th
23		Hong Won-gil 홍원길 (1925–1976)	28 December 1972	20 September 1973	Workers' Party of Korea	Kim Il (until 1976) Pak Song-chol (from 1976)	5th
(22)		Choe Jae-u 최재우 (1913–2004)	25 March 1971	16 December 1977	Workers' Party of Korea	Kim Il (until 1976) Pak Song-chol (from 1976)	5th
24		Ho Dam 허담 (1929–1991)	26 February 1973	16 December 1977	Workers' Party of Korea	Kim Il (until 1976) Pak Song-chol (from 1976)	5th
25		Ri Kun-mo 리근모 (1926–2001)	20 September 1973	April; 1977	Workers' Party of Korea	Kim Il (until 1976) Pak Song-chol (from 1976)	5th
26		Jong Jun-gi 정준기 (1924–2007)	20 September 1973	16 December 1977	Workers' Party of Korea	Kim Il (until 1976) Pak Song-chol (from 1976)	5th
27		Hong Song-nam 홍성남 (1929–2009)	20 September 1973	September; 1975	Workers' Party of Korea	Kim Il (until 1976) Pak Song-chol (from 1976)	5th
28		Kim Yong-ju 김영주 (1920–2021)	14 February 1974	16 December 1977	Workers' Party of Korea	Kim Il (until 1976) Pak Song-chol (from 1976)	5th
(23)		Hong Won-gil 홍원길 (1925–1976)	July; 1974	16 May 1976	Workers' Party of Korea	Kim Il (until 1976) Pak Song-chol (from 1976)	5th
29		Yon Hyong-muk 연형묵 (1931–2005)	1975	16 December 1977	Workers' Party of Korea	Kim Il (until 1976) Pak Song-chol (from 1976)	5th
30		Kong Jin-thae 공진태 (1927–2009)	26 June 1975	16 December 1977	Workers' Party of Korea	Kim Il (until 1976) Pak Song-chol (from 1976)	5th
31		Kye Ung-thae 계응태 (1925–2006)	11 December 1976	16 December 1977	Workers' Party of Korea	Kim Il (until 1976) Pak Song-chol (from 1976)	5th
(14)		Ri Jong-ok 리종옥 (1916–1999)	11 December 1976	16 December 1977	Workers' Party of Korea	Kim Il (until 1976) Pak Song-chol (from 1976)	5th
(31)		Kye Ung-thae 계응태 (1925–2006)	16 December 1977	6 April 1982	Workers' Party of Korea	Ri Jong-ok	6th
(24)		Ho Dam 허담 (1929–1991)	16 December 1977	6 April 1982	Workers' Party of Korea	Ri Jong-ok	6th
(26)		Jong Jun-gi 정준기 (1924–2007)	16 December 1977	6 April 1982	Workers' Party of Korea	Ri Jong-ok	6th
32		Kang Song-san 강성산 (1931–2000)	16 December 1977	6 April 1982	Workers' Party of Korea	Ri Jong-ok	6th
(30)		Kong Jin-thae 공진태 (1927–2009)	16 December 1977	6 April 1982	Workers' Party of Korea	Ri Jong-ok	6th
33		Kim Tu-yong 김두영 (1922–1985)	16 December 1977	6 April 1982	Workers' Party of Korea	Ri Jong-ok	6th
34		Ro Thae-sok 로태석 (1919–1979)	August; 1978	31 December 1979	Workers' Party of Korea	Ri Jong-ok	6th
35		Kang Hui-won 강희원 (1920–1994)	September; 1978	6 April 1982	Workers' Party of Korea	Ri Jong-ok	6th
36		Kim Kyong-ryon 김경련 (1925-2025)	December; 1979	6 April 1982	Workers' Party of Korea	Ri Jong-ok	6th
37		Jo Se-ung 조세웅 (1927–1998)	March; 1980	August; 1981	Workers' Party of Korea	Ri Jong-ok	6th
38		So Kwan-hui 서관희 (1926–1997)	1980	February; 1982	Workers' Party of Korea	Ri Jong-ok	6th
(25)		Ri Kun-mo 리근모 (1926–2001)	March; 1981	6 April 1982	Workers' Party of Korea	Ri Jong-ok	6th
39		Hong Si-hak 홍시학 (1926–2019)	24 April 1981	6 April 1982	Workers' Party of Korea	Ri Jong-ok	6th
40		Kim Hoe-il 김회일 (1909–1996)	September; 1981	6 April 1982	Workers' Party of Korea	Ri Jong-ok	6th
41		Hong Song-ryong 홍성룡	October; 1981	6 April 1982	Workers' Party of Korea	Ri Jong-ok	6th
42		Kim Pok-sin 김복신 (born 1925)	December; 1981	6 April 1982	Workers' Party of Korea	Ri Jong-ok	6th
(31)		Kye Ung-thae 계응태 (1925–2006)	6 April 1982	September; 1983	Workers' Party of Korea	Ri Jong-ok (until 1984) Kang Song-san (from 1984)	7th
(24)		Ho Dam 허담 (1929–1991)	6 April 1982	28 December 1983	Workers' Party of Korea	Ri Jong-ok (until 1984) Kang Song-san (from 1984)	7th
(41)		Hong Song-ryong 홍성룡	6 April 1982	4 February 1986	Workers' Party of Korea	Ri Jong-ok (until 1984) Kang Song-san (from 1984)	7th
(39)		Hong Si-hak 홍시학 (1926–2019)	6 April 1982	December; 1986	Workers' Party of Korea	Ri Jong-ok (until 1984) Kang Song-san (from 1984)	7th
(22)		Choe Jae-u 최재우 (1913–2004)	6 April 1982	December; 1983	Workers' Party of Korea	Ri Jong-ok (until 1984) Kang Song-san (from 1984)	7th
(30)		Kong Jin-thae 공진태 (1927–2009)	6 April 1982	1 October 1985	Workers' Party of Korea	Ri Jong-ok (until 1984) Kang Song-san (from 1984)	7th
43		Choe Kwang 최광 (1918–1997)	6 April 1982	29 December 1986	Workers' Party of Korea	Ri Jong-ok (until 1984) Kang Song-san (from 1984)	7th
44		Kim Chang-ju 김창주 (1922–2003)	6 April 1982	March; 1983	Workers' Party of Korea	Ri Jong-ok (until 1984) Kang Song-san (from 1984)	7th
(40)		Kim Hoe-il 김회일 (1909–1996)	6 April 1982	December; 1983	Workers' Party of Korea	Ri Jong-ok (until 1984) Kang Song-san (from 1984)	7th
(33)		Kim Tu-yong 김두영 (1922–1985)	6 April 1982	11 September 1985	Workers' Party of Korea	Ri Jong-ok (until 1984) Kang Song-san (from 1984)	7th
(42)		Kim Pok-sin 김복신 (born 1925)	6 April 1982	December; 1983	Workers' Party of Korea	Ri Jong-ok (until 1984) Kang Song-san (from 1984)	7th
(26)		Jong Jun-gi 정준기 (1924–2007)	6 April 1982	29 December 1986	Workers' Party of Korea	Ri Jong-ok (until 1984) Kang Song-san (from 1984)	7th
45		Kim Hwan 김환 (1929–2009)	June; 1983	29 December 1986	Workers' Party of Korea	Ri Jong-ok (until 1984) Kang Song-san (from 1984)	7th
46		Kim Yong-nam 김영남 (1928–2025)	28 December 1983	29 December 1986	Workers' Party of Korea	Ri Jong-ok (until 1984) Kang Song-san (from 1984)	7th
47		Choe Yong-rim 최영림 (born 1930)	1984	1 October 1985	Workers' Party of Korea	Ri Jong-ok (until 1984) Kang Song-san (from 1984)	7th
(37)		Jo Se-ung 조세웅 (1927–1998)	27 January 1984	May; 1985	Workers' Party of Korea	Ri Jong-ok (until 1984) Kang Song-san (from 1984)	7th
(42)		Kim Pok-sin 김복신 (born 1925)	27 January 1984	29 December 1986	Workers' Party of Korea	Ri Jong-ok (until 1984) Kang Song-san (from 1984)	7th
(43)		Kim Chang-ju 김창주 (1922–2003)	27 January 1984	29 December 1986	Workers' Party of Korea	Ri Jong-ok (until 1984) Kang Song-san (from 1984)	7th
48		An Sung-hak 안승학 (born 1922)	1 October 1985	4 February 1986	Workers' Party of Korea	Ri Jong-ok (until 1984) Kang Song-san (from 1984)	7th
(27)		Hong Song-nam 홍성남 (1929–2009)	4 February 1986	29 December 1986	Workers' Party of Korea	Ri Jong-ok (until 1984) Kang Song-san (from 1984)	7th
(46)		Kim Yong-nam 김영남 (1928–2025)	29 December 1986	24 May 1990	Workers' Party of Korea	Ri Kun-mo (until 1988) Yon Hyong-muk (from 1988)	8th
(42)		Kim Pok-sin 김복신 (born 1925)	29 December 1986	24 May 1990	Workers' Party of Korea	Ri Kun-mo (until 1988) Yon Hyong-muk (from 1988)	8th
(26)		Jong Jun-gi 정준기 (1924–2007)	29 December 1986	April; 1990	Workers' Party of Korea	Ri Kun-mo (until 1988) Yon Hyong-muk (from 1988)	8th
(44)		Kim Chang-ju 김창주 (1922–2003)	29 December 1986	24 May 1990	Workers' Party of Korea	Ri Kun-mo (until 1988) Yon Hyong-muk (from 1988)	8th
49		Kim Yun-hyok 김윤혁 (1926–2006)	29 December 1986	24 May 1990	Workers' Party of Korea	Ri Kun-mo (until 1988) Yon Hyong-muk (from 1988)	8th
(43)		Choe Kwang 최광 (1918–1997)	29 December 1986	12 February 1988	Workers' Party of Korea	Ri Kun-mo (until 1988) Yon Hyong-muk (from 1988)	8th
(27)		Hong Song-nam 홍성남 (1929–2009)	14 October 1987	24 May 1990	Workers' Party of Korea	Ri Kun-mo (until 1988) Yon Hyong-muk (from 1988)	8th
(37)		Jo Se-ung 조세웅 (1927–1998)	12 February 1988	June 2 1988	Workers' Party of Korea	Ri Kun-mo (until 1988) Yon Hyong-muk (from 1988)	8th
(45)		Kim Hwan 김환 (1929–2009)	12 February 1988	24 May 1990	Workers' Party of Korea	Ri Kun-mo (until 1988) Yon Hyong-muk (from 1988)	8th
(35)		Kang Hui-won 강희원 (1920–1994)	18 April 1989	24 May 1990	Workers' Party of Korea	Ri Kun-mo (until 1988) Yon Hyong-muk (from 1988)	8th
(27)		Hong Song-nam 홍성남 (1929–2009)	24 May 1990	5 September 1998	Workers' Party of Korea	Yon Hyong-muk (until 1992) Kang Song-san (1992–1997) Hong Song-nam (from 1997)	9th
(35)		Kang Hui-won 강희원 (1920–1994)	24 May 1990	28 July 1994	Workers' Party of Korea	Yon Hyong-muk (until 1992) Kang Song-san (1992–1997) Hong Song-nam (from 1997)	9th
(49)		Kim Yun-hyok 김윤혁 (1926–2006)	24 May 1990	5 September 1998	Workers' Party of Korea	Yon Hyong-muk (until 1992) Kang Song-san (1992–1997) Hong Song-nam (from 1997)	9th
(44)		Kim Chang-ju 김창주 (1922–2003)	24 May 1990	5 September 1998	Workers' Party of Korea	Yon Hyong-muk (until 1992) Kang Song-san (1992–1997) Hong Song-nam (from 1997)	9th
50		Jang Chol 장철 (1926–2003)	24 May 1990	5 September 1998	Workers' Party of Korea	Yon Hyong-muk (until 1992) Kang Song-san (1992–1997) Hong Song-nam (from 1997)	9th
(46)		Kim Yong-nam 김영남 (1928–2025)	24 May 1990	5 September 1998	Workers' Party of Korea	Yon Hyong-muk (until 1992) Kang Song-san (1992–1997) Hong Song-nam (from 1997)	9th
(47)		Choe Yong-rim 최영림 (born 1930)	24 May 1990	5 September 1998	Workers' Party of Korea	Yon Hyong-muk (until 1992) Kang Song-san (1992–1997) Hong Song-nam (from 1997)	9th
(42)		Kim Pok-sin 김복신 (born 1925)	24 May 1990	5 September 1998	Workers' Party of Korea	Yon Hyong-muk (until 1992) Kang Song-san (1992–1997) Hong Song-nam (from 1997)	9th
(45)		Kim Hwan 김환 (1929–2009)	24 May 1990	18 December 1991	Workers' Party of Korea	Yon Hyong-muk (until 1992) Kang Song-san (1992–1997) Hong Song-nam (from 1997)	9th
51		Kim Tal-hyon 김달현 (1941–2000)	24 May 1990	7 December 1993	Workers' Party of Korea	Yon Hyong-muk (until 1992) Kang Song-san (1992–1997) Hong Song-nam (from 1997)	9th
(39)		Hong Si-hak 홍시학 (1926–2019)	30 October 1990	11 December 1992	Workers' Party of Korea	Yon Hyong-muk (until 1992) Kang Song-san (1992–1997) Hong Song-nam (from 1997)	9th
(45)		Kim Hwan 김환 (1929–2009)	11 December 1992	5 September 1998	Workers' Party of Korea	Yon Hyong-muk (until 1992) Kang Song-san (1992–1997) Hong Song-nam (from 1997)	9th
(30)		Kong Jin-thae 공진태 (1927–2009)	8 January 1994	5 September 1998	Workers' Party of Korea	Yon Hyong-muk (until 1992) Kang Song-san (1992–1997) Hong Song-nam (from 1997)	9th

=== Cabinet (since 1998) ===
No.	Portrait	Name (Birth–Death)	Term of office		Party	Premier	SPA
No.	Portrait	Name (Birth–Death)	Took office	Left office	Party	Premier	SPA
52		Jo Chang-dok 조창덕 (1929–2013)	5 September 1998	3 September 2003	Workers' Party of Korea	Hong Song-nam	10th
53		Kwak Pom-gi 곽범기 (born 1939)	5 September 1998	3 September 2003	Workers' Party of Korea	Hong Song-nam	10th
54		Sin Il-nam 신일남 (born 1938)	29 April 2002	3 September 2003	Workers' Party of Korea	Hong Song-nam	10th
(53)		Kwak Pom-gi 곽범기 (born 1939)	3 September 2003	9 April 2009	Workers' Party of Korea	Pak Pong-ju (until 2007) Kim Yong-il (from 2007)	11th
55		Ro Tu-chol 로두철 (born 1950)	3 September 2003	9 April 2009	Workers' Party of Korea	Pak Pong-ju (until 2007) Kim Yong-il (from 2007)	11th
56		Jon Sung-hun 전승훈 (born 1951)	3 September 2003	9 April 2009	Workers' Party of Korea	Pak Pong-ju (until 2007) Kim Yong-il (from 2007)	11th
57		Thae Jong-su 태종수 (born 1936)	17 October 2007	9 April 2009	Workers' Party of Korea	Pak Pong-ju (until 2007) Kim Yong-il (from 2007)	11th
(53)		Kwak Pom-gi 곽범기 (born 1939)	9 April 2009	7 June 2010	Workers' Party of Korea	Kim Yong-il (until 2010) Choe Yong-rim (2010–2013) Pak Pong-ju (from 2013)	12th
(57)		Thae Jong-su 태종수 (born 1936)	9 April 2009	7 June 2010	Workers' Party of Korea	Kim Yong-il (until 2010) Choe Yong-rim (2010–2013) Pak Pong-ju (from 2013)	12th
(55)		Ro Tu-chol 로두철 (born 1950)	9 April 2009	9 April 2014	Workers' Party of Korea	Kim Yong-il (until 2010) Choe Yong-rim (2010–2013) Pak Pong-ju (from 2013)	12th
58		O Su-yong 오수용 (born 1947)	9 April 2009	7 June 2010	Workers' Party of Korea	Kim Yong-il (until 2010) Choe Yong-rim (2010–2013) Pak Pong-ju (from 2013)	12th
59		Pak Myong-son 박명선 (born 1943)	4 September 2009	7 June 2010	Workers' Party of Korea	Kim Yong-il (until 2010) Choe Yong-rim (2010–2013) Pak Pong-ju (from 2013)	12th
60		Pak Su-gil 박수길 (born 1948)	18 September 2009	13 April 2012	Workers' Party of Korea	Kim Yong-il (until 2010) Choe Yong-rim (2010–2013) Pak Pong-ju (from 2013)	12th
61		Kang Nung-su 강능수 (1930–2015)	7 June 2010	9 April 2014	Workers' Party of Korea	Kim Yong-il (until 2010) Choe Yong-rim (2010–2013) Pak Pong-ju (from 2013)	12th
62		Jo Pyong-ju 조병주 (born 1942)	7 June 2010	9 April 2014	Workers' Party of Korea	Kim Yong-il (until 2010) Choe Yong-rim (2010–2013) Pak Pong-ju (from 2013)	12th
63		Han Kwang-bok 한광복 (born 1946)	7 June 2010	October; 2012	Workers' Party of Korea	Kim Yong-il (until 2010) Choe Yong-rim (2010–2013) Pak Pong-ju (from 2013)	12th
64		Ri Thae-nam 리태남 (1938–2014)	7 June 2010	7 April 2011	Workers' Party of Korea	Kim Yong-il (until 2010) Choe Yong-rim (2010–2013) Pak Pong-ju (from 2013)	12th
65		Kim Rak-hui 김락희 (1933–2013)	7 June 2010	13 April 2012	Workers' Party of Korea	Kim Yong-il (until 2010) Choe Yong-rim (2010–2013) Pak Pong-ju (from 2013)	12th
66		Jon Ha-chol 전하철 (born 1928)	7 June 2010	13 April 2012	Workers' Party of Korea	Kim Yong-il (until 2010) Choe Yong-rim (2010–2013) Pak Pong-ju (from 2013)	12th
67		Kang Sok-ju 강석주 (1939–2016)	23 September 2010	9 April 2014	Workers' Party of Korea	Kim Yong-il (until 2010) Choe Yong-rim (2010–2013) Pak Pong-ju (from 2013)	12th
68		Ri Mu-yong 리무영 (born 1948)	7 June 2010	9 April 2014	Workers' Party of Korea	Kim Yong-il (until 2010) Choe Yong-rim (2010–2013) Pak Pong-ju (from 2013)	12th
69		Kim Yong-jin 김용진 (1953–2016)	January; 2012	9 April 2014	Workers' Party of Korea	Kim Yong-il (until 2010) Choe Yong-rim (2010–2013) Pak Pong-ju (from 2013)	12th
70		Ri Sung-ho 리승호 (died 2014)	13 April 2012	1 April 2013	Workers' Party of Korea	Kim Yong-il (until 2010) Choe Yong-rim (2010–2013) Pak Pong-ju (from 2013)	12th
71		Ri Chol-man 리철만 (born 1968)	13 April 2012	9 April 2014	Workers' Party of Korea	Kim Yong-il (until 2010) Choe Yong-rim (2010–2013) Pak Pong-ju (from 2013)	12th
72		Kim In-sik 김인식 (born 1948)	13 April 2012	9 April 2014	Workers' Party of Korea	Kim Yong-il (until 2010) Choe Yong-rim (2010–2013) Pak Pong-ju (from 2013)	12th
(56)		Jon Sung-hun 전승훈 (born 1951)	18 August 2012	9 April 2014	Workers' Party of Korea	Kim Yong-il (until 2010) Choe Yong-rim (2010–2013) Pak Pong-ju (from 2013)	12th
(55)		Ro Tu-chol 로두철 (born 1950)	9 April 2014	11 April 2019	Workers' Party of Korea	Pak Pong-ju	13th
(69)		Kim Yong-jin 김용진 (1953–2016)	9 April 2014	July; 2016	Workers' Party of Korea	Pak Pong-ju	13th
(68)		Ri Mu-yong 리무영 (born 1948)	9 April 2014	11 April 2017	Workers' Party of Korea	Pak Pong-ju	13th
(71)		Ri Chol-man 리철만 (born 1968)	9 April 2014	29 June 2016	Workers' Party of Korea	Pak Pong-ju	13th
73		Kim Tok-hun 김덕훈 (born 1961)	30 April 2014	11 April 2019	Workers' Party of Korea	Pak Pong-ju	13th
74		Im Chol-ung 임철웅 (born 1962)	22 May 2014	11 April 2019	Workers' Party of Korea	Pak Pong-ju	13th
75		Choe Yong-gon 최영건 (1951–2015)	19 June 2014	May; 2015	Workers' Party of Korea	Pak Pong-ju	13th
76		Ri Ju-o 리주오 (born 1956)	29 June 2016	11 April 2019	Workers' Party of Korea	Pak Pong-ju	13th
77		Ri Ryong-nam 리룡남 (born 1960)	29 June 2016	11 April 2019	Workers' Party of Korea	Pak Pong-ju	13th
78		Ko In-ho 고인호	29 June 2016	11 April 2019	Workers' Party of Korea	Pak Pong-ju	13th
79		Jon Kwang-ho 전광호	29 June 2016	11 April 2019	Workers' Party of Korea	Pak Pong-ju	13th
80		Tong Jong-ho 동정호 (born 1956)	13 May 2017	11 April 2019	Workers' Party of Korea	Pak Pong-ju	13th
(55)		Ro Tu-chol 로두철 (born 1950)	11 April 2019	31 December 2019	Workers' Party of Korea	Kim Jae-ryong (until 2020) Kim Tok-hun (2020–2024) Pak Thae-song (from 2024)	14th
(74)		Im Chol-ung 임철웅 (born 1962)	11 April 2019	17 January 2021	Workers' Party of Korea	Kim Jae-ryong (until 2020) Kim Tok-hun (2020–2024) Pak Thae-song (from 2024)	14th
(73)		Kim Tok-hun 김덕훈 (born 1961)	11 April 2019	13 August 2020	Workers' Party of Korea	Kim Jae-ryong (until 2020) Kim Tok-hun (2020–2024) Pak Thae-song (from 2024)	14th
(76)		Ri Ju-o 리주오 (born 1956)	11 April 2019	17 January 2021	Workers' Party of Korea	Kim Jae-ryong (until 2020) Kim Tok-hun (2020–2024) Pak Thae-song (from 2024)	14th
(77)		Ri Ryong-nam 리룡남 (born 1960)	11 April 2019	17 January 2021	Workers' Party of Korea	Kim Jae-ryong (until 2020) Kim Tok-hun (2020–2024) Pak Thae-song (from 2024)	14th
(79)		Jon Kwang-ho 전광호	11 April 2019	17 January 2021	Workers' Party of Korea	Kim Jae-ryong (until 2020) Kim Tok-hun (2020–2024) Pak Thae-song (from 2024)	14th
(80)		Tong Jong-ho 동정호 (born 1956)	11 April 2019	17 January 2021	Workers' Party of Korea	Kim Jae-ryong (until 2020) Kim Tok-hun (2020–2024) Pak Thae-song (from 2024)	14th
81		Kim Il-chol 김일철	31 December 2019	17 January 2021	Workers' Party of Korea	Kim Jae-ryong (until 2020) Kim Tok-hun (2020–2024) Pak Thae-song (from 2024)	14th
82		Yang Sung-ho 양승호	12 April 2020	19 January 2026	Workers' Party of Korea	Kim Jae-ryong (until 2020) Kim Tok-hun (2020–2024) Pak Thae-song (from 2024)	14th
83		Pak Jong-gun 박정근	17 January 2021	22 March 2026	Workers' Party of Korea	Kim Jae-ryong (until 2020) Kim Tok-hun (2020–2024) Pak Thae-song (from 2024)	14th
84		Jon Hyon-chol 전현철	17 January 2021	8 June 2022	Workers' Party of Korea	Kim Jae-ryong (until 2020) Kim Tok-hun (2020–2024) Pak Thae-song (from 2024)	14th
85		Kim Song-ryong 김성룡	17 January 2021	2024	Workers' Party of Korea	Kim Jae-ryong (until 2020) Kim Tok-hun (2020–2024) Pak Thae-song (from 2024)	14th
86		Ri Song-hak 리성학	17 January 2021	30 December 2023	Workers' Party of Korea	Kim Jae-ryong (until 2020) Kim Tok-hun (2020–2024) Pak Thae-song (from 2024)	14th
87		Pak Hun 박훈	17 January 2021	24 December 2024	Workers' Party of Korea	Kim Jae-ryong (until 2020) Kim Tok-hun (2020–2024) Pak Thae-song (from 2024)	14th
88		Ju Chol-gyu 주철규	17 January 2021	30 December 2023	Workers' Party of Korea	Kim Jae-ryong (until 2020) Kim Tok-hun (2020–2024) Pak Thae-song (from 2024)	14th
89		Jon Sung-guk 전승국	8 June 2022	22 March 2026	Workers' Party of Korea	Kim Jae-ryong (until 2020) Kim Tok-hun (2020–2024) Pak Thae-song (from 2024)	14th
(71)		Ri Chol-man 리철만 (born 1968)	30 December 2023	22 March 2026	Workers' Party of Korea	Kim Jae-ryong (until 2020) Kim Tok-hun (2020–2024) Pak Thae-song (from 2024)	14th
90		Kim Myong-hun 김명훈	30 December 2023	22 March 2026	Workers' Party of Korea	Kim Jae-ryong (until 2020) Kim Tok-hun (2020–2024) Pak Thae-song (from 2024)	14th
91		Jong Myong-su 정명수	1 July 2024	22 March 2026	Workers' Party of Korea	Kim Jae-ryong (until 2020) Kim Tok-hun (2020–2024) Pak Thae-song (from 2024)	14th
92		Kim Jong-gwan 김정관	24 December 2024	22 March 2026	Workers' Party of Korea	Kim Jae-ryong (until 2020) Kim Tok-hun (2020–2024) Pak Thae-song (from 2024)	14th
(83)		Pak Jong-gun 박정근	22 March 2026	Incumbent	Workers' Party of Korea	Pak Thae-song	15th
(84)		Jon Hyon-chol 전현철	22 March 2026	Incumbent	Workers' Party of Korea	Pak Thae-song	15th
(87)		Pak Hun 박훈	22 March 2026	Incumbent	Workers' Party of Korea	Pak Thae-song	15th
93		Ri Kyong-il 리경일	22 March 2026	Incumbent	Workers' Party of Korea	Pak Thae-song	15th
94		Kim Chang-sok 김창석	22 March 2026	Incumbent	Workers' Party of Korea	Pak Thae-song	15th
(89)		Jon Sung-guk 전승국	22 March 2026	Incumbent	Workers' Party of Korea	Pak Thae-song	15th
(71)		Ri Chol-man 리철만 (born 1968)	22 March 2026	Incumbent	Workers' Party of Korea	Pak Thae-song	15th

== See also ==
- Prime Minister of Imperial Korea (1895–1910)
- Government of North Korea
- List of leaders of North Korea
- List of heads of state of North Korea
- President of North Korea
- Eternal President of the Republic
- Politics of North Korea
