= Kim Tok-hun =

North Korean politician (born 1961)

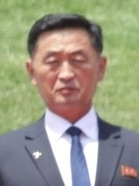
- Kim in 2024

First Vice Premier of North Korea
- Incumbent
- Assumed office 22 March 2026
- Premier: Pak Thae-song

Head of the Economic Affairs Department of the Central Committee of the Workers' Party of Korea
- Incumbent
- Assumed office 27 December 2024
- General Secretary: Kim Jong Un
- Preceded by: O Su-yong
- In office 31 December 2019 – 19 August 2020
- General Secretary: Kim Jong Un
- Preceded by: O Su-yong
- Succeeded by: Kim Tu-il

13th Premier of North Korea
- In office 13 August 2020 – 27 December 2024
- Supreme Leader: Kim Jong Un
- Preceded by: Kim Jae-ryong
- Succeeded by: Pak Thae-song
Additional offices
Vice President of the State Affairs Commission
In office 29 September 2021 – 27 December 2024
President	Kim Jong Un
Vice Premier of North Korea
In office 30 April 2014 – 13 August 2020
Premier	Kim Jae-ryong; Pak Pong-ju

Personal details
- Born: 1961 (age 64–65) North Korea
- Party: Workers' Party of Korea

Korean name
- Hangul: 김덕훈
- Hanja: 金德訓
- RR: Gim Deokhun
- MR: Kim Tŏkhun

Kim Tok-hun (Korean: 김덕훈, born 1961) is a North Korean politician who was formerly the premier of North Korea and a full member on the Presidium of the Politburo of the Workers' Party of Korea. He is additionally a vice president of the State Affairs Commission.

Kim served as a vice premier between 2014 and 2020 and premier between 2020 and 2024. He joined the WPK Central Committee in 2016, and was later promoted to the WPK Politburo in 2019. He now serves as the head of the WPK's Economic Affairs Department.

== Early life ==
Kim was born in 1961. Kim began his career as a floor manager and supervisor in North Korea's heavy industry sector. His first significant position was an assistant manager at the Taean Heavy Machinery Complex. He was appointed manager of Taean Heavy Machinery Complex in 2003 when the DPRK instituted its "complex enterprise system" in 2001. Kim was elected a deputy to the 11th SPA in 2003.

== Political career ==
Kim was previously a delegate for North-South cooperation.

Kim Tok Hun has been a member of the Central Committee of the Workers' Party of Korea since the 7th Congress in May 2016. He later joined the party Politburo on 11 April 2019 as an alternate member, and was promoted to full member on 31 December, and concurrently as a party vice-chairman, with a central department portfolio. He possibly earned Kim Jong Un's approval by uncovering a corruption scandal involving cadre training facilities in February 2020. In April 2020 he was also elected chairman of the Budget Committee of the Supreme People's Assembly.

== Premier (2020–2024) ==
On 13 August 2020, in the wake of COVID-19 spillover in North Korea and floods hitting the southern part of the country, he was appointed premier of the cabinet by Kim Jong Un, and elevated to the top-level Politburo Presidium. From 2022 to December 2024, he has been the second-highest-ranking official in North Korea after Kim Jong Un. At the conclusion of the annual year-end general meeting of the Central Committee of the Workers' Party of Korea on 27 December 2024, Kim was replaced by Pak Thae-song as premier and moved to head of the party's Economic Affairs Department.

=== Criticism by Kim Jong Un on Ansok tideland ===
In August 2023, Kim Jong Un, the leader of North Korea, publicly voiced strong criticism of Kim Tok Hun and his cabinet for their handling of the Ansok tideland disaster following Tropical Storm Khanun in a Korean Central News Agency (KCNA) article. He alleged that the recovery efforts were inadequately organized and executed, showing a lack of urgency and commitment.

The North Korean leader expressed deep concern over the decline in administrative and economic discipline within the Cabinet stating "the administrative and economic discipline of the Kim Tok Hun Cabinet has got out of order more seriously". He attributed the inefficiencies in dealing with the crisis to this decline. Kim Jong Un criticized Kim Tok Hun for what he saw as a weak work attitude and misguided perspective regarding the Ansok tideland situation. The premier's alleged neglect of his responsibilities in the crisis was a point of significant concern with Kim Jong Un saying "...the premier looked round the site once or twice with the attitude of an onlooker and sent a vice-premier to it, who played the role of a fuel supplier only".

In his critique, Kim Jong Un hinted at the possibility of expelling the director of the Tideland Reclamation Bureau from the WPK, implying that the director may have played a role in the mishandling of the disaster.

The North Korean leader emphasized the necessity of ideological and moral reforms among government officials. He called on them to demonstrate a strong work ethic and unwavering commitment to the nation's well-being. Kim Jong Un underscored that the damage resulting from the Ansok tideland flooding was not solely a natural calamity but rather a human-induced disaster. He held accountable those who did not heed the Party's guidance and exhibited irresponsibility in their duties. Following this incident, according to a North Hamgyong resident, "administrative officials, including the People's Committee and managers of factories and institutions at all levels, are walking on eggshells".

Political offices
Preceded by O Su-yong	Chairman of the Supreme People's Assembly Budget Committee; 2020	Succeeded by O Su-yong
Preceded by Kim Jae-ryong	Premier of North Korea; 2020–2024	Succeeded by Pak Thae-song
Preceded by O Su-yong	Chairman of the Supreme People's Assembly Budget Committee; 2025–present	Incumbent
Party political offices
Preceded by O Su-yong	Director of the Workers' Party of Korea Economic Affairs Department; 2019–2020	Succeeded by Kim Tu-il
Preceded by O Su-yong	Director of the Workers' Party of Korea Economic Affairs Department; 2024–present	Incumbent
