= Pak Pong-ju =

Premier of North Korea from 2003 to 2007 and 2013 to 2019

- 박봉주

Vice President of the State Affairs Commission
- In office 29 June 2016 – 29 September 2021
- President: Kim Jong Un
- First Vice President: Choe Ryong-hae
- Succeeded by: Kim Tok-hun

9th Premier of North Korea
- In office 1 April 2013 – 11 April 2019
- Chairman: Kim Jong Un
- Preceded by: Choe Yong-rim
- Succeeded by: Kim Jae-ryong
- In office 3 September 2003 – 11 April 2007
- Chairman: Kim Jong Il
- Preceded by: Hong Song-nam
- Succeeded by: Kim Yong-il

Personal details
- Born: 10 April 1939 (age 87) Kankyōhoku Province, Korea, Empire of Japan
- Party: Workers' Party of Korea

Korean name
- Hangul: 박봉주
- Hanja: 朴奉珠 (Note: Some Chinese media translate this as "朴鳳柱")
- RR: Bak Bongju
- MR: Pak Pongju

Pak Pong-ju (Korean: 박봉주; born 10 April 1939) is a North Korean politician who served as the Premier of North Korea from 2003 to 2007 and again from 2013 to 2019. He was elected a member of the Presidium of the Workers' Party of Korea (WPK) in 2016.

== Early career ==
Pak Pong-ju was born in 1939. Pak began his career in 1962 as manager of the Yongchon food factory in North Pyong'an Province. He became an alternative member of the ruling Korean Workers' Party (KWP) Central Committee in October 1980, and chief of the Namhung Youth Chemical Combine Committee in July 1983. In May 1993, he became vice director of the KWP's Light Industries Department, and in March 1994, he was the vice director of the party's Economic Policy Supervisory Department. In July of that year, Pak ranked 188th out of 273 members on the funeral committee of the late leader Kim Il Sung, indicating that he was on the periphery of the elite hierarchy. However, in September 1998, he was appointed to the chemical-industries portfolio under premier Hong Song-nam, and replaced him five years later.

== First Premiership (2004–2007) ==
In 2005, in a plenary session of the Supreme People's Assembly Pak spoke regarding the reintroduction of the public distribution system. Pak proposed an administrative solution to food distribution and labeled it the party's position: "By all means, we must reach this year's grain production targets by thoroughly implementing the party's policy of agricultural revolution by fully concentrating and mobilizing the entire country's efforts into the agricultural front".

On 11 April 2007, the Korean Central News Agency reported that during the 5th session of the 11th Supreme People's Assembly of the DPRK, Pak Pong-ju was "relieved … of premiership" and Kim Yong-il elected the new premier. He had not been seen in public since May 2006. It is rumored that he was removed from office because he misused oil funds to be used for the farming sector, or that he was too heavily focused on economic development suggestions from the People's Republic of China, instead of home-grown ideas.

As Premier, Pak Pong-ju is the head of government in the DPRK, and formed the top executive leadership of the DPRK with other executive officials. The other branch of the executive government was the National Defense Commission of North Korea, led by Chairman of the National Defence Commission Kim Jong Un. As premier, he is responsible for organizing the cabinet and appoints ministers and vice-premiers upon confirmation by the Supreme People's Assembly. Prior to becoming Premier, Pak had served as Chemical Industry Minister. He serves as part of a committee heading the executive branch of the North Korean government, along with Kim Jong Un and SPA Presidium chairman Kim Yong-nam. Each man nominally holds one-third of the powers held by a president in most presidential systems. Pak handles domestic affairs, Kim Yong-nam conducts foreign relations and Kim Jong Un commands the armed forces. On 23 August 2010, The New York Times reported that Pak Pong-ju "resurfaced at a state function in the capital, Pyongyang, on Saturday, carrying the title of first deputy director of the Central Committee of the ruling Workers' Party of Korea, according to the North's state-run Korean Central Television." He effectively replaced Kim Jong Il's sister Kim Kyong-hui as director of the Party Light Industry Department in 2012 (he was its vice-director from 1992 to 1998 and 2010–2012).

He was reputedly close to Jang Sung-taek and part of the current shifting of the government's attention to the consumer economy.

== Second Premiership (2013–2019) ==
On 31 March 2013 he was elected to Politburo Standing Committee. On 1 April, he replaced Choe Yong-rim for a second term as Premier. On 22 April, he chaired the first full session of the cabinet which included a discussion of the "byungjin line" of co-developing the economy and nuclear weapons, as well as budgetary issues for the People's Economy in the first and second quarters of 2013. In July, it was announced that Pak's cabinet had taken full authority over economic measures by calling to "unconditionally executing the cabinet's decisions and instructions". On 11 April 2019, Pak was replaced by Kim Jae-ryong during the first session of the 14th Supreme People's Assembly and given vice-chairmanship of the Workers' Party of Korea.

== Post-Premiership ==
Pak Pong-ju has been seen in the Kumsusan Palace of the Sun, visiting the building on the 26th anniversary of the death of Kim Il Sung. During the 2022 celebration of the Day of the Foundation of the Republic, he participated in the central concert and banquet.

== Notes ==
Political offices
Preceded by Hong Song-nam	Premier of North Korea; 2003–2007	Succeeded by Kim Yong-il
Preceded by Choe Yong-rim	Premier of North Korea; 2013–2019	Succeeded by Kim Jae-ryong
