= Kim Kwang-jin (politician) =

North Korean general and politician (1927–1997)

- 김광진
- Leader: Kim Il Sung; Kim Jong Il

Personal details
- Born: 12 May 1927 Pyongyang, Heian'nan Province, Korea, Empire of Japan
- Died: 27 February 1997 (aged 69) Pyongyang, North Korea
- Party: Workers' Party of Korea
- Education: Mangyongdae Revolutionary School
- Alma mater: Kim Il Sung Military University

Military service
- Allegiance: North Korea
- Branch/service: Korean People's Army
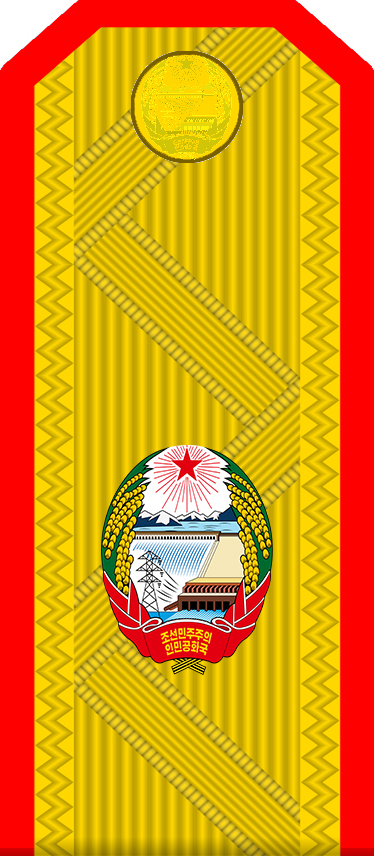
- Rank: Ch'asu (Vice Marshal)

Kim Kwang-jin (Korean: 김광진; Hanja: 金光鎭; May 12, 1927 – February 27, 1997) was a North Korean general and politician. He held the rank of Vice Marshal.

== Biography ==
Kim Kwang-jin was born on May 12, 1927, in Pyongyang, Heian'nan Province (South Pyongan Province), Korea, Empire of Japan. Before liberation, he was a worker. Kim graduated from the Mangyongdae Revolutionary School. Kim served as an artillery commander during the Korean War, and participated in military education at Kim Il Sung Military University from September 1954. During the war, he became an artillery commander holding the rank of Major. Kim was a part of the North Korean forces entering Seoul and advancing to the Nakdong River.

After being appointed as an artillery commander and corps commander in the position of lieutenant general in 1969, Kim was the commander of the artillery corps for more than 10 years until being appointed to the position of military vice-chairman of the General Staff Department in October 1980. He was also elected as member of the Supreme People's Assembly in its 5th Convocation in December 1972. Following that, Kim was re-elected to the 7th, 8th and the 9th convocations of the SPA. He was elected a candidate member of the 6th Central Committee at the 6th Congress of the Workers' Party of Korea in October 1980 and a full member of the Central Committee of the Party in July 1984. In April 1984, he was appointed commander of the 5th Corps, and in December of the same year, he was appointed Vice Minister of the People's Armed Forces.

Kim contributed greatly to the implementation of Juche, suggested by Kim Jong Il. In September 1990, he represented North Korea internationally eight times, from the first inter-Korean high-level talks to the eighth high-level talks, and visited the Blue House. At the 7th inter-Korean high-level talks in May 1992, Kim was widely known in South Korea as an important figure on the North's side of high-level talks, due to his position of chairman of the Military Joint Commission. After being promoted to the rank of Vice Marshal in April 1992, he was selected as a member of the Central Military Commission of the Workers' Party of Korea in March 1995.

In August 1995, the year of the death of the Minister of People's Armed Forces O Jin-u, Kim wrote an editorial titled The People's Army is Kim Jong Il's army, and in any case, let's protect him with loyalty in Rodong Sinmun, urging the entire military to loyalty to Kim Jong Il.

In October 1995, Kim was appointed as the first deputy head of the Ministry of People's Armed Forces, at the same time being awarded the Order of Kim Il Sung.

Kim died on February 27, 1997. At the time of his death, he served as the first vice-minister of the Ministry of People's Armed Forces, was a member of the National Defense Commission, and a military member of the Party's Central Military Commission. During his life, Kim was decorated with multiple awards, including the title of Hero of the Republic, several Order of the National Flag(First Class) orders, the Order of Kim Il Sung, and the Free Independence Medal. Kim was given a state funeral. His funeral committee consisted of Ri Ul-sol, Jo Myong-rok, Kim Yong-chun, and others.
