= Kim Ryong-yon =

North Korean politician and military officer (1916–2008)

- 김룡연
- Supreme Leader: Kim Il Sung; Kim Jong Il

Personal details
- Born: 1916 Korea, Empire of Japan
- Died: 20 March 2008 (aged 91–92)
- Party: Workers' Party of Korea

Military service
- Allegiance: North Korea
- Branch/service: Korean People's Army
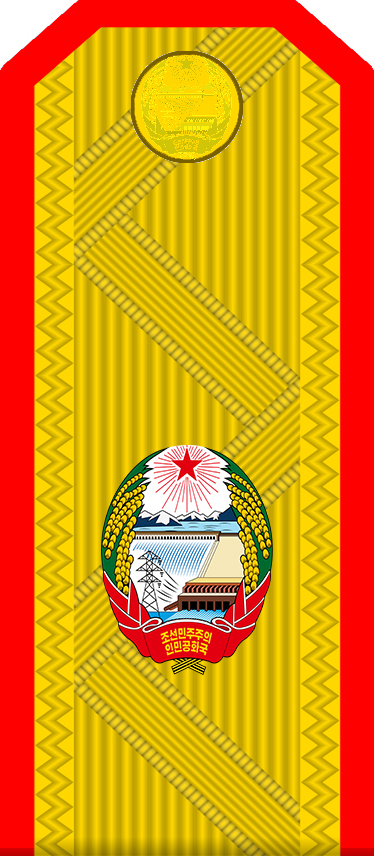
- Rank: Ch'asu (Vice Marshal)

Kim Ryong-yon (Korean: 김룡연; Hanja: 金龍淵; 1916 – 20 March 2008) was a North Korean politician and military officer who held the rank of Vice Marshal.

== Biography ==
Kim served with the Chinese Communist Army in 1930s and 1940s. Cha-soo Kim served as a liaison to the Kim Il Sung anti-Japanese guerrilla group, and after the formal establishment of the North Korean state he served in various positions in the Korean People's Army. In 1968 he was promoted to lieutenant general, in 1986 to 3 star general, in 1990 to Army General and in 1998 to Vice Marshal. He also served as a delegate to the Supreme People's Assembly from the 4th convocation in 1967, through the 5th, 6th, 7th, 8th, 9th, 10th and 11th convocation in 2003. He served as the director of the Red Flag Mangyongdae Revolutionary School.

== Works ==
- Kim, Ryong-yon (1971). "At a Camping Site". Reminiscences of the Anti-Japanese Guerillas. Pyongyang: Foreign Languages Publishing House. OCLC 2913326.
