= Kim Pong-ryul =

North Korean general (1918–1995)

- 김봉률

Vice Minister of the Ministry of People's Armed Forces
- Leader: Kim Il Sung; Kim Jong Il

Personal details
- Born: 1918 China
- Died: 19 July 1995 (aged 76–77) Pyongyang, North Korea
- Party: Workers' Party of Korea

Military service
- Allegiance: North Korea
- Branch/service: Korean People's Army
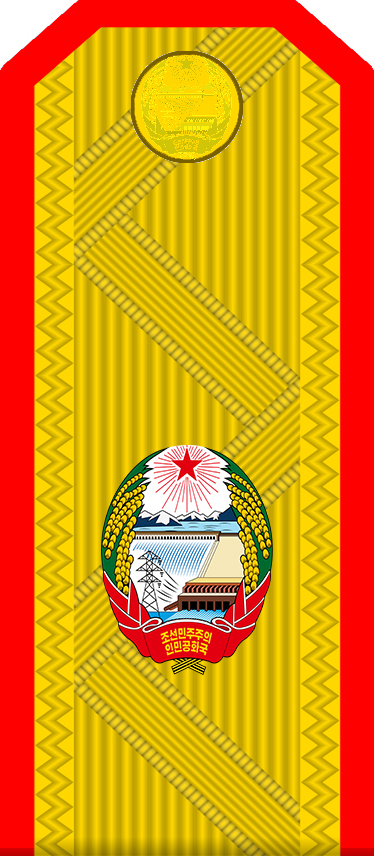
- Rank: Ch'asu (Vice Marshal)
- Battles/wars: Chinese Civil War; Korean Independence Movement; World War II

Kim Pong-ryul (Korean: 김봉률; Hanja: 金奉律; 1918 – July 1995) was a North Korean general of the Korean People's Army who served as vice Minister of the People's Armed Forces as well as member of the Workers' Party of Korea, North Korea's ruling communist party. He held the rank of Vice Marshal.

== Biography ==
Kim Pong-ryul participated in the war against Germany as a special armament of the former Soviet artillery during the Korean War, and returned to North Korea at the end of war in 1953. In December 1972 he was appointed Vice-Chief of the Ministry of People's Armed Forces. In December 1986 he became a member of the Central Committee of the party and in March 1995, a member of the Central Military Commission, a member of the National Defence Commission since May 1990. He was also a member of the Supreme People's Assembly for the 3rd, 4th, 5th, 7th, 8th and 9th convocations. On April 20, 1992, he was promoted to the rank of Vice Marshal. He died in July 1995 of 'incurable disease'.
