= Choe In-dok =

North Korean politician (1920–2003)

- 최인덕
- Leader: Kim Il Sung; Kim Jong Il

Personal details
- Born: 1920 Anju, South Pyongan, Kankyōhoku-dō, Korea, Empire of Japan
- Died: 31 August 2003 (aged 82–83) Pyongyang, North Korea
- Citizenship: North Korean
- Party: Workers' Party of Korea

Military service
- Allegiance: North Korea
- Branch/service: Korean People's Army
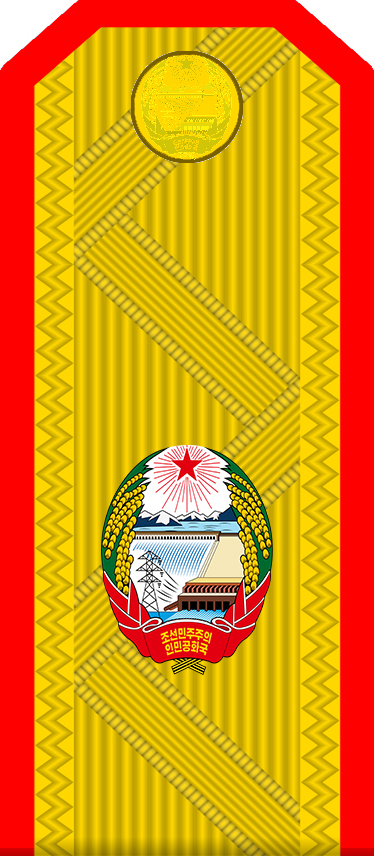
- Rank: Ch'asu (Vice Marshal)

Choe In-dok (Korean: 최인덕; Hanja: 崔仁德; 1920 – August 31, 2003) was a North Korean politician, a member of the Central Committee of the Workers' Party of Korea and an officer in the Korean People's Army. He held the rank of Vice Marshal.

== Biography ==
He was born in 1920 in Anju, Kankyōhoku-dō, Korea, Empire of Japan. During the Japanese rule of Korea he was a member of the partisan resistance group, messenger of Kim Il Sung and a company commander. In June 1946 he was among the founders of the Railway Guard. and later he served as an Infantry Independent Brigade Artillery commander. In 1950, with the onset of the Korean War, he served as commander of the 5th Regiment. In November 1967 he was elected to the 4th convocation of the Supreme People's Assembly. In October 1970 he was appointed to lieutenant-general and received the title Hero of the Republic. In November 1970 he became a member of the Central Committee. In September 1972 he was appointed to a district Commander. In December 1972 he was elected to the 5th convocation of the Supreme People's Assembly. In July 1975 he was appointed commander of the 1st Corps. In November 1977 he was elected to the 6th Convocation of the Supreme People's Assembly. In September 1978 he was promoted in rank and appointed commander of Hamhung District. During the 6th Congress of the Workers' Party of Korea held in October 1980 he was appointed a full (voting) member of the 6th Central Committee. In February 1982 he was elected a member of the 7th Convocation of the Supreme People's Assembly. On April that year he was appointed president of the Kim Il Sung Military University. In November 1986 he was elected deputy to the 8th Convocation of the Supreme People's Assembly, in 1990 to the 9th Convocation and in September 1998 to the 10th Convocation for the 604th district. On April 20, 1992 he was awarded once again Hero of the Republic and appointed to the rank of Vice Marshal.

== Works ==
- Choe, In-dok (1970). "Breaking Through the Depth of the Enemy". Reminiscences of the Anti-Japanese Guerillas. Pyongyang: Foreign Languages Publishing House. OCLC 1097890.
- — (1971). "Concern About the Health of a Guerilla". Reminiscences of the Anti-Japanese Guerillas. Pyongyang: Foreign Languages Publishing House. OCLC 2913326.
