= Ju To-il =

North Korean army officer (1922–1994)

- 주도일

Member of the WPK Central Military Commission
- Leader: Kim Il Sung; Kim Jong Il

Personal details
- Born: 1922 Wangqing County, China
- Died: 5 July 1994 (aged 71–72) Pyongyang, North Korea
- Citizenship: North Korean
- Party: Workers' Party of Korea

Military service
- Allegiance: North Korea
- Branch/service: Korean People's Army
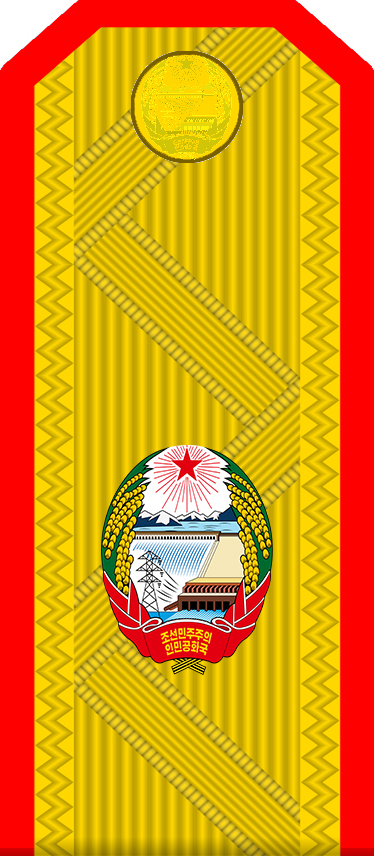
- Rank: Ch'asu (Vice Marshal)
- Battles/wars: Chinese Civil War; Korean Independence Movement; World War II; Korean War

Ju To-il (Korean: 주도일; Hanja: 朱道一; 1922 – July 5, 1994) was a North Korean army officer who served as the personal guard of Kim Il Sung held the rank of Vice-Marshal.

== Biography ==
Born and raised in Wangqing County, Gando. Since the age of 15, he has been active as a guard and messenger for Kim Il Sung and his guerrilla unit. In the early 1940s, he worked as a special reconnaissance unit of the Soviet Army across the Tumen River. After liberation of Korea, he escorted Kim Il Sung and entered Korea. After entering the country, he served as a battalion commander and battalion commander of the Kim Il Sung Guard and participated in the war as battalion commander of the People's Army during the Korean War.

In 1954, he studied abroad at the Soviet Military College, and after graduating in 1958, he returned to Korea and became a regiment Candidate member of the Central Committee in 1961, Deputy of the Supreme People's Assembly of the 3rd, 4th, 5th, 8th and 9th convocation, the division commander in 1962, the 15th division commander in 1964, the corps commander in 1965, a member of the Party Central Committee in November 1970, the commander of the Army Group in 1972, Military commander in 1978, member of Party Central Committee in 1980, member of Central Military Commission. Vice Minister of People's Armed Forces in 1981, the commander of the People's Army in April 1985, the commander of the Pyongyang Defense Command in December 1988, a member of the National Defense Commission in May 1990, and in April 1992, he was promoted to the rank of Vice Marshal.

In May 1979, he was awarded the title of republic hero and the first degree of national merit. In North Korea, he was recognized as a military commander with extensive practical experience and knowledge of modern military science. In accordance with the three-dimensional tactics of the modern war, he was the protagonist of the creation and reinforcement of the sniper unit by ingeniously emphasizing the position and role of the light and sniper units, and as an active advocate of the reinforcement of the light armed forces, he contributed to the modernization and military strength of the North Korean military.

He was a guard and assistant to Kim Il Sung for a long time with Ri Tu-ik, Jo Myong-rok, Paek Hak-rim, and Jon Mun-sop, and supported his power after Kim Jong Il was injured. After his death, he was buried in the Revolutionary Martyrs' Cemetery.
