= Pak Ki-so =

North Korean politician and marshal

- Pak Ki So
- Supreme Leader: Kim Jong Il

Personal details
- Born: 1929 Korea, Empire of Japan
- Died: 5 January 2010 (aged 80–81) North Korea
- Citizenship: North Korean
- Party: Workers' Party of Korea
- Education: Kim Il-sung Military University

Military service
- Allegiance: North Korea
- Branch/service: Korean People's Army
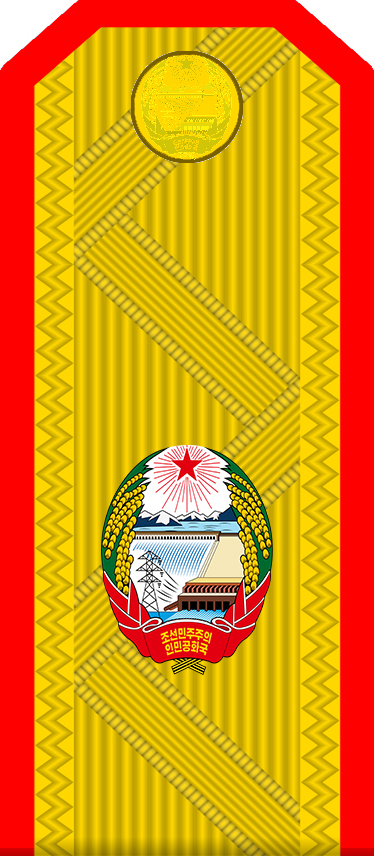
- Rank: Ch'asu (Vice Marshal)

Pak Ki-so (Korean: 박기서/朴基瑞) (1929 – 5 January 2010) was a North Korean politician and marshal. He served as the commander of Pyongyang Defense Command

== Biography ==
In November 1970 he was appointed an alternate member of the 5th Central Committee and elected to full member of the 6th Central Committee in October 1980, following the 6th Congress of the Workers' Party of Korea. In 1982 he was elected to the 7th convocation of the Supreme People's Assembly. In February 1986 he was appointed to a full member of the Central Committee. In November that year he was appointed commander of the 820th Tank Division and was also elected to the 8th convocation. In 1990 he was elected to the 9th convocation In 1990 he was elected to the 9th convocation of the Supreme People's Assembly. In March 1995 he was appointed a member of the 6th Central Military Commission. On 13 April 1997 he was promoted to Vice Marshal rank. Between October 1996 and 2005 he served as the commander of Pyongyang Defense Command. In January 2010 he died. He was member of the funeral committee of Choe Hyon and Pak Song-chol.

In April 1982 he was awarded Order of Kim Il Sung.
