= Kim Ik-hyon =

North Korean politician (1916–2009)

- 김익현

Member of the 6th Central Military Commission
- Leader: Kim Il Sung; Kim Jong Il

Personal details
- Born: 1916 Kōkai Province, Korea, Empire of Japan
- Died: 15 January 2009 (aged 87–88) Pyongyang, North Korea
- Citizenship: North Korean
- Party: Workers' Party of Korea
- Education: Kim Il Sung Higher Party School

Military service
- Allegiance: North Korea
- Branch/service: Korean People's Army
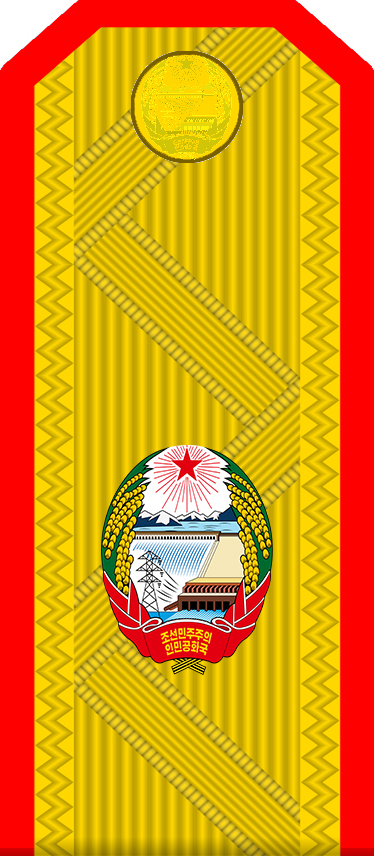
- Rank: Ch'asu (Vice Marshal)
- Battles/wars: Chinese Civil War; Korean Independence Movement; World War II; Korean War

Kim Ik-hyon (Korean: 김익현; Hanja: 金益鉉, 1916 – 15 January 2009) was a North Korean politician and military officer. He was member of the Central Committee of the Workers' Party of Korea. He was elected to the 11th convocation of the Supreme People's Assembly in 2003.

== Biography ==
Born in 1916 in Hwanghae Province (now North Hwanghae Province), Korea, Empire of Japan. After that, he joined the Northeast Anti-Japanese United Army and conducted anti-Japanese activities until 1945 in a unit led by Kim Il Sung. When the Japanese rule ended, in November 1945 he became chairman of the Korean Communist Youth Alliance. After that, he graduated from Kim Il Sung Higher Party School, and in 1951 he became the first regimental leader of the 2nd Division of the Korean People's Army and entered the Korean War. In 1968, he was elected a member of the 4th Central Committee of the WPK and a member of the 5th Central Committee of the WPK in 1970. In 1972 he was promoted to lieutenant general and became commander of the 4th Army. In December of the same year, he was elected as the a member of the 5th Convocation of the Supreme People's Assembly. After serving as deputy chief of staff in 1975, he was promoted to senior general in 1977 and became deputy director of the Ministry of People's Armed Forces.

Member of the 6th Central Military Commission of the Workers' Party of Korea in May 1991, he was elected director of the Civil Defense Department of the WPK, and was promoted to general in November of the same year. He was awarded the Hero of the Republic in 1992 and in Day of the Sun 1994 he was promoted to the rank of Vice Marshal. In 2003, he was appointed an honorary censor of the High Command, and in 2005 he was dismissed as the director of the Civil Defense Department of the Central Committee. In September of the same year, he participated in the 60th Anniversary of the Victory Event held in China as the head of the Anti-Japan Revolutionary Fighters (항일혁명투사) and met with President Hu Jintao.

Kim Ik-hyon died in January 2009 after a long illness, aged 87 and was buried in a state funeral.

== Works ==
- Kim Ik-hyon (1987). The Immortal Woman Revolutionary. Vol. 1. Pyongyang: Foreign Languages Publishing House. OCLC 769327670.
- — (1989). The Immortal Woman Revolutionary. Vol. 2. Pyongyang: Foreign Languages Publishing House. OCLC 769737236.
- — (1995). The Immortal Woman Revolutionary. Vol. 3. Pyongyang: Foreign Languages Publishing House. OCLC 769974881.
