= Korean Social Democratic Party =

Korean Social Democratic Party 조선사회민주당
- Abbreviation: KSDP
- Chairman: Ri Son-gwon
- Vice-Chairman: Ri Kum-chol
- Founder: Cho Man-sik
- Founded: 3 November 1945
- Headquarters: Pyongyang
- Newspaper: Korean Social Democratic Party (English); KSDP Says ... (English); 조선사회민주당 (Korean)
- Membership: 30,000+ (2007 est.)
- National affiliation: Democratic Front for the Reunification of Korea (1949–2024)
- Slogan: Independence, sovereignty, democracy, peace and the defence of human rights

Party flag

- Korean Social Democratic Party
- Hangul: 조선사회민주당
- Hanja: 朝鮮社會民主黨
- RR: Joseon sahoe minjudang
- MR: Chosŏn sahoe minjudang

The Korean Social Democratic Party (KSDP; Korean: 조선사회민주당) is a political party in North Korea that is allied with the ruling Workers' Party of Korea (WPK).

It was formed on 3 November 1945 as the Korean Democratic Party by a mixed group of entrepreneurs, merchants, handicraftsmen, petite bourgeoisie, peasants, and Christians led by Cho Man-sik. The party's founders were motivated by anti-imperialist and anti-feudal aspirations, and aimed to eliminate the legacy of Japanese rule and build a new democratic society. Cho was arrested by Soviet authorities in 1946, followed by a purge of his supporters from the party. Subsequently, the party came under greater influence of the WPK. Since then, it has acted as a satellite party of the WPK. In 1980, it was renamed to the Korean Social Democratic Party.

== History ==
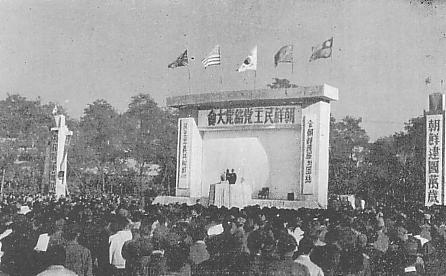
Launching convention of the Korean Democratic Party in Pyongyang in 1945, after the Liberation of Korea

The party was established in Pyongyang by Cho Man-sik on 3 November 1945 as the Korean Democratic Party (조선민주당). It quickly gained support from Christian businessmen and intellectuals, as well as well-off workers, and had around half a million members after only a few weeks, while reports by the Soviet Union said that the party had 141 thousand members by May 1946. Cho was forced to appoint Choe Yong-gon, a secret communist sympathizer, as his deputy in the party, while the communists increasingly targeted the party for infiltration.

Cho opposed the results of the Moscow Conference in December 1945, in which the foreign ministers of the Soviet Union, the United Kingdom and the United States agreed to establish a joint trusteeship over the formerly Japanese-occupied Korea, which triggered widespread opposition and protests. The KDP Central Committee's Plenum on 2 January 1946 formally voted against the trusteeship plan, and on 5 January, Cho resigned from his position as chairman of the Provisional People's Committee for the Five Provinces, leading many KDP members to follow his example.

Shortly after his resignation, he was arrested by Soviet authorities. Cho's arrest led to many of the party's leaders moving to Seoul in South Korea, where they set up a new headquarters; the party nominated five candidates for the May 1948 Constitutional Assembly elections in South Korea, winning one seat, taken by Yi Yun-yong. In North Korea, the party held its first Congress on 24 February 1946, when Choe Yong-gon was formally elected as leader of the party while Cho Man-sik was declared as "a traitor to the nation and a hireling of American and Japanese imperialism". A purge of Cho's alleged or real sympathizers in the party took place afterwards.

The KDP subsequently joined the newly-established North Korean Fatherland United Democratic Front on 22 July, effectively becoming subordinate to the newly-emerging Communist Party of Korea (which later became the Workers' Party of Korea). The KDP held its Second Congress on 13–15 April 1947, where it continued to attack Cho, praised the "liberating mission of the heroic Soviet Army" and adopted a structure closely resembling that of the Workers' Party of North Korea.

Despite increasingly coming under the control of the communists, the KDP initially still continued to attract members, with a Soviet document mentioning the party reaching 291,459 members by December 1946, while a resolution of the Second Congress from May 1947 stating that it had 273,665 members. The party was used by the WPK leadership to keep track on and diffuse anti-communists in North Korea.

KDP candidates were given 35 seats in the August 1948 elections, the newly-elected Supreme People's Assembly (SPA) later proclaimed the Democratic People's Republic of Korea (DPRK) in September 1948. The party further declined during the Korean War, when many of its members sided with the government of South Korea and left the North when South Korean and United Nations forces retreated in 1950–1951. By the end of the war, its membership dropped to below 10,000. In February 1956, Choe Yong-gon was appointed as a vice chairman of the WPK, leaving Hong Ki-hwang, deputy chairman of the KDP since late 1945, to replace him as chairman of the KDP.

It was given eleven seats in the 1957 parliamentary elections. Hong and Chondoist Chongu Party leader Kim Tal-hyon were made ministers without portfolios in September 1957, the last time non-Communist parties were given Cabinet positions. Hong and Kim were purged in 1958 as part of a purge of non-WPK parties, with Hong being accused of espionage and "having contacts with American imperialism". In 1959 and 1960 all of the party's offices were shut down by the government. It was subsequently reduced to four seats in 1962 and one in 1967 and 1972. In 1980 it adopted its current name, the Korean Social Democratic Party (KSDP). The 1990 elections saw the party awarded 51 seats. It had 52 seats following the 1998 elections and 50 after the 2009 elections. It retained the same number of seats in the 2014 elections. After the disbandment of the Fatherland Front alliance in 2024, the party runs under the "Friendly parties and religious organizations" umbrella in North Korean elections.

== Ideology ==
The Korean Democratic Party was initially founded by Cho Man-sik as a nationalist party that could potentially play a significant role in a coalition with the communists. After Cho's arrest, the party transitioned into a satellite party of the communists. During its Second Congress in 1947, the KDP formally incorporated the theory of "people's democratic revolution" into its program; while not explicitly mentioning socialism, the KDP declared it was unconditionally supportive of the political and social reforms done in North Korea. It also supported friendly ties with the Soviet Union and adopted democratic centralism to its structure.

Since its neutralization and effective demise by the WPK, the party has been used in North Korean propaganda targeting foreign sympathizers. In 1981, the party was renamed to the Korean Social Democratic Party. Because of the ostensible social democratic ideology, which is intelligible to foreigners, the Social Democratic Party is used in such propaganda much more than the other legal minor party, the Chondoist Chongu Party. In the 1990s, the KSDP published periodical magazines in Korean and English. These magazines sought to simultaneously convince foreigners that North Korea has a multi-party system with independent parties, but also contradictorily that minor parties in North Korea support the Workers' Party of Korea without reservation.

== Organization ==
The KSDP was a member of the Democratic Front for the Reunification of Korea from 1949 until the front's dissolution in 2024. It participated in the front alongside the other legal political parties and organisations of North Korea.

From 1982 until the early 2000s, the party distributed its party journal abroad in Korean and English translation. Contrary to its usual portrayal in official propaganda, for a brief time in the mid-to-late 1980s, the party's journal featured texts raising criticism of government policies. These included calls to give more support to people with disabilities or improve the petition system, as well as raising the potential benefits of allowing more than one candidate per election district and allowing voters to decide which would be elected. It is believed these statements may have been linked to a brief liberalization of North Korea's justice system that occurred around the same time. Since the mid-2000s, its party journal is only available online.

The party was headed by Pak Yong-il until his death in 2022. The previous chairman was Kim Yong-dae. As of January 2007, the party had more than 30,000 members. In March 2026, North Korean state media identified Ri Son-gwon as the chairman of the KSDP.

== International relations ==
The Korean Social Democratic Party had formed a sisterhood alliance of the now-defunct South Korea's Democratic Labor Party and Unified Progressive Party. The party also has contacts with South Korea's Progressive Party. The party issued an "anti-Japan joint statement" (반일공동성명) with the Progressive Party in 2019. The party historically maintained communications with the now-defunct Japan Socialist Party.

== Election results ==
=== North Korea ===
Supreme People's Assembly elections
Election	Seats	+/–
1948	35 / 572	
1957	11 / 215	▼24
1962	4 / 383	▼7
1967	1 / 457	▼3
1972	1 / 541	Steady
1977	—N/a	—N/a
1982	—N/a	—N/a
1990	51 / 687	
1998	53 / 687	▲2
2003	—N/a	—N/a
2009	50 / 687	
2014	50 / 687	Steady
2019	—N/a	—N/a
2026	—N/a	—N/a

=== South Korea ===
Vice presidential elections
Election	Candidate	Votes	%	Outcome
1948	Cho Man-sik	10	5.08	Not elected
1952	Yi Yun-yong	458,583	6.43	Not elected
1956	Yi Yun-yong	34,926	0.40	Not elected

Constitutional Assembly elections
Election	Leader	Votes	%	Seats	Status
1948	Choe Yong-gon	Part of NARRKI		1 / 200	Governing coalition

== See also ==
- List of political parties in North Korea
