= 5th Central Committee of the Workers' Party of Korea =

5th Central Committee
- Emblem of the Workers' Party of North Korea

13 November 1970 – 14 October 1980 (9 years, 336 days) Overview
- Type: Central Committee of the Workers' Party of Korea
- Election: 5th Congress

Leadership
- General Secretary: Kim Il Sung
- Political Committee: 11 full 4 candidates
- Secretariat: 10 members
- Inspection organ: 7 members

Members
- Total: 117

Candidates
- Total: 55

The 5th Central Committee of the Workers' Party of Korea (WPK) was elected at the 5th Congress on 13 November 1970. and remained in session until the election of the 6th Central Committee on 14 October 1980. In between party congresses and specially convened conferences the Central Committee is the highest decision-making institution in the WPK and North Korea. The Central Committee is not a permanent institution and delegates day-to-day work to elected bodies, such as the Political Committee, the Secretariat and the Inspection Committee in the case of the 5th Central Committee. It convenes meetings, known as "Plenary Session of the [term] Central Committee", to discuss major policies. Only full members have the right to vote, but if a full member cannot attend a plenary session, the person's spot is taken over by an alternate. Plenary session can also be attended by non-members, such meetings are known as "Enlarged Plenary Session", to participate in the committee's discussions.

== Plenums ==
Plenum	Start–end	Length	Agenda of the plenum
1st Plenary Session	13 November 1970	1 day	1 item.: Election of officers and apparatus heads of the 5th Central Committee.
2nd Plenary Session	19–23 April 1971	5 days	3 items.: On the current international situation and Korean unification.; On the technical revolution of orchard works and the current economic problems facing the country.; On the WPK's guidance of health programs.
3rd Plenary Session	6–8 March 1962	2 days	3 items.: On international problems.; Report by Kim Il Sung, known as "Revolutionary Solidarity of the International Situation and the Emphasis on the Self-Reliant Unification of the Fatherland".; Report by Kim Il on the system of technical revolution.; On the production of consumer goods.; Report by Pak Song-chol on strengthening labour discipline.
4th Plenary Session	1–6 July 1972	7 days	2 items.: On the WPK's policy of peaceful unification; Report by Kim Il Sung, known as "The General Unity Transcending the Differences in Thought, Ideologies, and Systems for the Self-Reliant and Peaceful Unification of the Fatherland without External Interference".; On introducing ten-year compulsory education for middle and high schools.; Report by Kim Il on how to implement aforementioned education reform.
5th Plenary Session	23–26 October 1972	4 days	2 items.: Report by Kim Il-sung on the Constitution of North Korea.; Report by Choe Chae-u on the 1973 economic plan.; On reissuing of party identity cards.
6th Plenary Session	22–25 December 1972	4 days	2 items.: On the Constitution of North Korea.; Kim Il-sung talks about the important conclusions reached on the constitution.
7th Plenary Session	4–17 September 1973	14 days	2 items.: On implementing the three revolutions decided by the 5th Congress.; On enforcing the cost-accounting system in line with the Taean Work System.; Report by Yang Hyong-sop.
8th Plenary Session	11–13 February 1974	3 days	2 items.: On socialist construction.; Report by Kim Il-sung.; On the abolition of taxes and the reducing the price of manufactured goods.
9th Plenary Session	Not disclosed.	Not disclosed.	Not disclosed.
10th Plenary Session	11–17 February 1975	8 days	3 items.: On the guidance work to implement The Three Revolutions as proposed by the great leader Kim Il-sung.; On the Central Committee's proclamation on the 30th Anniversary of the WPK.; Closing statement by Kim Il-sung.
11th Plenary Session	19–21 November 1975	3 days	2 items.: Debate on the economic plan for 1976.; Reports by the WPK Central Committee organs.; Closing remarks by Kim Il-sung.; The Plenary Sessions approves of Kim Il-sung's conclusions.
12th Plenary Session	11–14 October 1976	4 days	3 items.: On the 1976 farming results.; On the aim of producing 10 millions tons of grain ahead of time by realising the five-point policy.; Closing statement by Kim Il-sung.
13th Plenary Session	4–6 April 1977	3 days	3 items.: Debate on preventing drought damage through a mobilisation of the party, military and people.; Reviewing the fulfilment of the decisions made at the 18th Plenary Session of the 4th Central Committee.; Closing statement by Kim Il-sung.
14th Plenary Session	5–7 September 1977	3 days	2 items.: Theses on Socialist Education.; Speech by Kim Il-sung on the thesis; Discussion of theses by members of the 5th Central Committee.
15th Plenary Session	13 December 1977	1 day	3 items.: Debate on the 2nd Seven Year-Plan.; Report by Hong Song-yong, the Chairman of the State Planning Commission.; On organisational matters.; Closing address by Kim Il-sung.
16th Plenary Session	8 January 1978	1 day	2 items.: Debate on the approval of a letter on behalf of the WPK Central Committee to all party members.; Closing statement by Kim Il-sung.
17th Plenary Session	27–28 November 1978	4 days	2 items.: On the 1979 economic plan.; Closing address by Kim Il-sung.
18th Plenary Session	13–15 June 1979	3 days	1 item.: Reviewing the fulfilment of the decisions made at the 13th Plenary Session of the 5th Central Committee.
19th Plenary Session	1–12 December 1979	12 days	3 items.: On the economic plan for 1980.; On mobilising the party, military and people to construct dams and build hydropower plants to avert flooding and boost electricity output.; On the convening of the 6th Congress.

== Members ==
=== Full ===
Rank	Name Hangul	Level of government (Offices held)	4th CC	6th CC	Inner-composition		
Rank	Name Hangul	Level of government (Offices held)	4th CC	6th CC	5th POL	5th SEC	5th INS
1	Kim Il Sung	Central: General Secretary of the WPK Central Committee	Old	Reelected	Member	Gen. Sec.	—
2	Choe Yong-gon	—	Old	Died	Member	Secretary	—
3	Kim Il	—	Old	Reelected	Member	Secretary	—
4	Pak Song-chol	—	Old	Reelected	Member	—	—
5	Choe Hyon	—	Old	Reelected	Member	—	—
6	Kim Yong-ju	—	Old	Demoted	Member	Secretary	—
7	O Chin-u	—	Old	Reelected	Member	Secretary	—
8	Kim Tong-gyu	—	Old	Demoted	Member	Secretary	—
9	So Chol	—	Old	Reelected	Member	—	—
10	Kim Chung-nin	—	Candidate	Reelected	Member	Secretary	—
11	Han Ik-su	—	Old	Demoted	Member	Secretary	—
12	Hyon Mu-gwang	—	Old	Reelected	Candidate	Secretary	—
13	Chong Chun-taek	—	Old	Demoted	Candidate	—	—
14	Yang Hyong-sop	—	New	Reelected	Candidate	Secretary	—
15	Kim Man-gum	—	Old	Reelected	Candidate	—	—
16	Nam Il	—	Old	Died	—	—	—
17	Choe Yong-jin	—	New	Reelected	—	—	—
18	Hong Won-gil	—	Candidate	Demoted	—	—	—
19	Chong Kyong-hui	—	New	Reelected	—	—	—
20	Kim Yo-jung	—	New	Demoted	—	—	Chairman
21	O Paek-ryong	—	Old	Reelected	—	—	—
22	Chon Chang-chol	—	Old	Reelected	—	—	—
23	Chong Tong-chol	—	New	Reelected	—	—	—
24	Hwang Sun-hui	—	Candidate	Reelected	—	—	—
25	Pak Yong-sun	—	Old	Reelected	—	—	—
26	Paek Nam-un	—	Old	Died	—	—	—
27	Choe Won-taek	—	Old	Died	—	—	—
28	Yu Chang-sik	—	New	Demoted	—	—	—
29	Ho Tam	—	New	Reelected	—	—	—
30	Kim Pyong-ha	—	New	Demoted	—	—	—
31	Chon Mun-sop	—	Old	Reelected	—	—	—
32	Kim Hyok-chol	—	New	Reelected	—	—	—
33	Yu Chong-suk	—	New	Reelected	—	—	—
34	Yim Chun-chu	—	Old	Reelected	—	—	—
35	Kim Chwa-hyok	—	Old	Reelected	—	—	—
36	Chi Pyong-hak	—	Old	Demoted	—	—	—
37	Kim Tae-hong	—	Old	Demoted	—	—	—
38	Yim Chol	—	Old	Demoted	—	—	—
39	Tae Pyong-yol	—	Candidate	Reelected	—	—	—
40	Paek Hak-nim	—	Candidate	Reelected	—	—	—
41	Pak Mun-gyu	—	Old	Demoted	—	—	—
42	O Tong-uk	—	New	Demoted	—	—	—
43	Pak Hak-se	—	New	Reelected	—	—	—
44	Chu To-il	—	New	Reelected	—	—	—
45	Yi Tu-ik	—	New	Reelected	—	—	—
46	Yi Ul-sol	—	New	Reelected	—	—	—
47	Kim Chol-man	—	New	Reelected	—	—	—
48	O Chae-won	—	New	Reelected	—	—	—
49	Chon Mun-uk	—	New	Reelected	—	—	—
50	Choe In-dok	—	New	Reelected	—	—	—
51	Kim Ik-hyon	—	New	Demoted	—	—	—
52	Kang Hyon-su	—	New	Reelected	—	—	—
53	Yi Yong-mu	—	New	Demoted	—	—	—
54	Yi Kun-mo	—	Candidate	Reelected	—	—	—
55	Hong Si-hak	—	New	Reelected	—	—	—
56	No Pyong-u	—	New	Demoted	—	—	—
57	Yun Ki-bok	—	New	Reelected	—	—	—
58	Choe Chae-u	—	Candidate	Reelected	—	—	—
59	Song Pok-ki	—	Candidate	Demoted	—	—	—
60	O Tae-bong	—	Candidate	Demoted	—	—	—
61	Kim Kuk-tae	—	New	Reelected	—	—	—
62	Jong Jun-gi	—	New	Reelected	—	—	—
63	Yon Hyong-muk	—	New	Reelected	—	—	—
64	Pak Su-dong	—	New	Reelected	—	—	—
65	Kang Song-san	—	New	Reelected	—	—	—
66	Yi Pong-gil	—	New	Reelected	—	—	—
67	Kim Song-ae	—	New	Reelected	—	—	—
68	O Suk-hui	—	New	Demoted	—	—	—
69	Yi Son-hwa	—	New	Demoted	—	—	—
70	Yu Sun-hui	—	New	Demoted	—	—	—
71	Choe Yun-su	—	New	Demoted	—	—	—
72	Kang Hui-won	—	Old	Reelected	—	—	—
73	Kye Ung-tae	—	New	Reelected	—	—	—
74	Pi Chang-nin	—	Old	Demoted	—	—	—
75	Chang Yun-pil	—	Candidate	Reelected	—	—	—
76	Hyon Chol-gyu	—	New	Demoted	—	—	—
77	Choe Yong-nim	—	New	Reelected	—	—	—
78	Han Yong-hak	—	New	Demoted	—	—	—
79	Kim Hoe-il	—	Old	Reelected	—	—	—
80	Kim Yong-nam	—	New	Reelected	—	—	—
81	Kim Yun-son	—	New	Demoted	—	—	—
82	Kim Sok-hwan	—	New	Demoted	—	—	—
83	Sim Kyong-chol	—	New	Reelected	—	—	—
84	Yang Man-chol	—	New	Demoted	—	—	—
85	Yi Chi-chan	—	Candidate	Reelected	—	—	—
86	Yu Sung-nam	—	New	Demoted	—	—	—
87	Pae Sung-hyok	—	New	Demoted	—	—	—
88	Choe Chang-gwon	—	New	Demoted	—	—	—
89	Kim Chong-yong	—	New	Reelected	—	—	—
90	Chon Chae-bong	—	New	Reelected	—	—	—
91	Kim Chang-gwon	—	New	Demoted	—	—	—
92	Pak Yong-sok	—	New	Reelected	—	—	—
93	Kim Pyong-yul	—	New	Reelected	—	—	—
94	Yi Kil-song	—	New	Reelected	—	—	—
95	Yi Yong-ik	—	New	Reelected	—	—	—
96	Yim Su-man	—	New	Reelected	—	—	—
97	Yi Tong-chun	—	New	Reelected	—	—	—
98	Kim I-hun	—	New	Demoted	—	—	—
99	No Tae-sok	—	Candidate	Demoted	—	—	—
100	Kim Kyong-yon	—	New	Reelected	—	—	—
101	Kim Su-duk	—	New	Demoted	—	—	—
102	Hwang Chang-yop	—	New	Reelected	—	—	—
103	Yi Myon-sang	—	Candidate	Reelected	—	—	—
104	Yang Kun-ok	—	Old	Demoted	—	—	—
105	Yom Tae-jun	—	Candidate	Reelected	—	—	—
106	Yi Min-su	—	New	Demoted	—	—	—
107	Yi Kyong-sok	—	New	Demoted	—	—	—
108	Kim Kye-hyon	—	New	Demoted	—	—	—
109	O Kuk-yol	—	New	Reelected	—	—	—
110	Kim Kuk-hun	—	New	Reelected	—	—	—
111	Kim Si-hak	—	New	Reelected	—	—	—
112	Choe Chang-hwan	—	New	Demoted	—	—	—
113	An Sung-hak	—	Candidate	Reelected	—	—	—
114	Yi Kon-il	—	New	Demoted	—	—	—
115	Chon Yong-hui	—	New	Demoted	—	—	—
116	Kim Nak-hui	—	New	Demoted	—	—	—
117	Pak Hae-gwon	—	New	Demoted	—	—	—
118	Kim Chong-il	—	New	Reelected	—	—	—

=== Candidates ===
Rank	Name Hangul	4th CC	6th CC				
Rank	Name Hangul	4th CC	6th CC	1	Cho Myong-son	New	Full
2	Kim Yong-yon	New	Candidate				
3	Kim Song-guk	New	Demoted				
4	Pak Son-gyun	New	Demoted				
5	Kye Hyong-sun	New	Candidate				
6	Kim Ung-sam	New	Candidate				
7	Chon Ha-chol	New	Candidate				
8	Son Song-pil	New	Demoted				
9	Yim Hyong-gu	New	Full				
10	Yi Rim-su	New	Demoted				
11	Kim Ui-sun	New	Demoted				
12	Yi Pong-won	New	Full				
13	Pak Yong-sin	New	Demoted				
14	Paek Pom-su	New	Full				
15	Yi Si-won	New	Demoted				
16	Sim Chang-wan	New	Full				
17	Kim Chang-bok	New	Demoted				
18	Son Kyong-jun	New	Full				
19	Chon Pyong-ho	New	Full				
20	Kim Hyong-bong	New	Candidate				
21	Choe Chin-song	New	Full				
22	Chu Kyu-chang	New	Candidate				
23	Choe Chong-gon	Old	Demoted				
24	Yang Chung-gyom	Old	Demoted				
25	Kim Pyong-sam	Old	Demoted				
26	Yi Chang-su	New	Demoted				
27	Paek Son-il	Old	Demoted				
28	Yi Hong-gyun	Old	Demoted				
29	Kim Hong-gwan	Old	Demoted				
30	Sin Chin-sun	New	Candidate				
31	Chon Se-bong	New	Full				
32	Kim Kwan-sop	Old	Full				
33	O Yong-bang	New	Candidate				
34	So Chang-nam	New	Demoted				
35	Yi Pong-sop	New	Demoted				
36	Pak Ki-so	New	Candidate				
37	An Myong-chol	New	Demoted				
38	Kim Chae-yong	New	Demoted				
39	Kim Nung-il	New	Demoted				
40	Yi Pong-gyom	New	Demoted				
41	Hyon Chang-yong	New	Demoted				
42	Chu Chang-bok	New	Candidate				
43	Pak Chun-sik	New	Demoted				
44	Kim Ki-son	New	Full				
45	Yi Chol-bong	New	Candidate				
46	Kim Kwang-guk	New	Demoted				
47	O Kyong-hue	New	Demoted				
48	Yi Chong-il	New	Demoted				
49	Ho Chang-suk	New	Candidate				
50	Wang Ok-hwan	New	Candidate				
51	Chang Chol	New	Candidate				
52	Kim Kum-ok	New	Demoted				
53	Ho Yon-suk	New	Demoted				
54	Yi Pil-song	New	Demoted				
55	So Yun-sok	New	Full				
