= Paek Hak-rim =

North Korean politician (1918–2006)

Personal details
- Born: October 1918 Heian'nan-dō (South Pyongan Province), Korea, Empire of Japan
- Died: October 5, 2006 (aged 87–88)
- Awards: Order of Kim Il Sung; Hero of the Republic (2); Jubilee Medal "60 Years of Victory in the Great Patriotic War 1941–1945"

Military service
- Allegiance: North Korea
- Branch/service: Korean People's Army
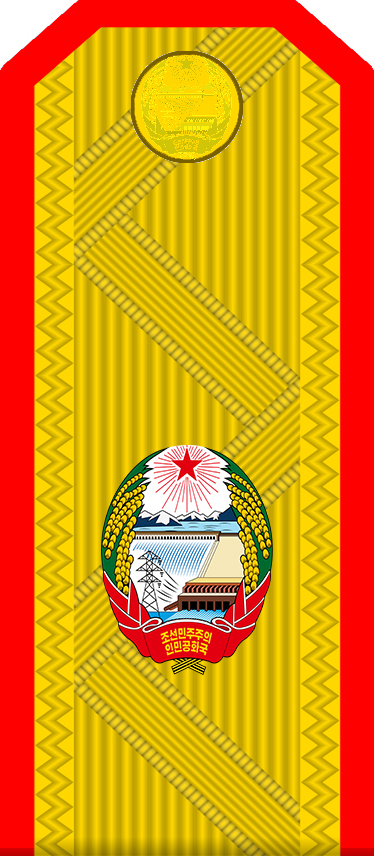
- Rank: Ch'asu (Vice Marshal)

Korean name
- Hangul: 백학림
- Hanja: 白鶴林
- RR: Baek Hakrim
- MR: Paek Hangnim

Paek Hak-rim (October 1918 – October 5, 2006) was the Deputy Director of the North Korean Ministry of Public Security. He occupied a number of high-ranking positions, including serving from 1998 to 2003 on the National Defense Commission. He was also the Minister of People's Security from 1998 to 2003.

== Biography ==
Paek was born in South Pyongan Province, and served in the guerrilla armies of the Korean independence movement before 1945. He also served in the North Korean army after independence, reaching the rank of Major General in 1958 and Lieutenant General in 1962. In 1962, he was appointed Director of the Political Security Bureau of the Ministry of National Defense and promoted to lieutenant general. In March 1970, he was appointed Deputy Minister of Social Security. In November 1970, he was elected to the Central Committee of the Workers' Party of Korea, and in August 1978, he was appointed deputy Minister of the People's Armed Forces. In 1992 he was promoted to the rank of Vice Marshal. He had been a delegate to the Supreme People's Assembly following the 4th (1967), 7th (1982), 8th (1986), 9th (1990), 10th (1998), and 11th (2003) elections. He joined the Central Committee of the Workers' Party of Korea in 1970, and served on that body continuously beginning in 1980. In April 2000 he was appointed to the Minister of People's Security, a position he held until July 2003.

Paek died of a brain hemorrhage on at 2 PM on October 5, 2006. The following day a wreath was sent to his funeral by Kim Jong Il, and laudatory obituaries were distributed through the North Korean media.

== Works ==
- Paek Hak-rim (1968). "A Bowl of Parched-rice Powder". Reminiscences of the Anti-japanese Guerillas. Pyongyang: Foreign Languages Publishing House. OCLC 3207400.
- — (1977). "On Our Way to the Homeland". As He Leads the Revolution, for the Freedom and Liberation of the People. Pyongyang: Foreign Languages Publishing House. OCLC 6198041.

== See also ==
- Politics of North Korea

Political offices
Preceded by ?	Minister of People's Security; 1998–2003	Succeeded by Choe Ryong-su
