= Chondoist Chongu Party =

Popular front party in North Korea

Chondoist Chongu Party 천도교청우당
- Chairman: Ri Myong-chol
- Founder: Kim Tal-hyon
- Founded: 8 February 1946
- Headquarters: Pyongyang
- Ideology: Chondoist interests
- Religion: Chondoism
- National affiliation: Democratic Front for the Reunification of Korea (1949–2024)

Party flag

Korean name
- Hangul: 천도교청우당
- Hanja: 天道敎靑友黨
- RR: Cheondogyo cheongudang
- MR: Ch'ŏndogyo ch'ŏngudang

The Chondoist Chongu Party (Note: An approximate translation of the party name into English could be the "Party of the Young Friends of Ch'ŏndogyo [the Heavenly Way]") (Korean: 천도교청우당) is a political party in North Korea allied with the ruling Workers' Party of Korea (WPK) that is affiliated with the Ch'ŏndogyo religion.

The party was founded on 8 February 1946 by a group of followers of the Ch'ŏndogyo, and its founding leader was Kim Tal-hyon. The party has become more closely aligned with the ruling WPK over time.

== History ==
The Ch'ŏndogyo religious ideology was originated by Donghak Koreans in response to the Christian missionary activities in Korea at the end of the nineteenth century. The Ch'ŏndogyo became a hotbed of Korean nationalism. Ch'ŏndo farmers participated in the Donghak Peasant Revolution in 1894 and the movement played an important role in the March First Movement in 1919. The communist parties of the Soviet Union and Korea perceived Ch'ŏndogyo as a "utopian peasant movement". By 1945, Ch'ŏndogyo had become the second largest religion in northern Korea, with 1.5 million believers.

The Chondoist Chongu Party was established on 8 February 1946 with Ch'ŏndogyo activist Kim Tal-hyon as its first leader. It assembled 98,000 members after a few months of existence, and was larger (in membership) than the Communist Party of Korea. In December 1946, it had 204,387 members.

On 22 July 1946, the Democratic Front for the Reunification of Korea was formed as a united front. The Chondoist Chongu Party was one of the four parties included in it. Thus the subordination of the party to the Communist Party of Korea (Note: Until December 1945: "North Korean Bureau of the Communist Party of Korea" (조선공산당 북조선분국 Chosŏn Kongsandang pukchosŏn pun'guk); from December 1945 to mid-1946 no longer using the label "North Korean bureau"; in mid-1946 renamed to "Communist Party of North Korea" (북조선공산당 Pukchosŏn Kongsandang); in August 1946 merged with the New People's Party to become the "Workers' Party of North Korea"; in June 1949 merged with the Workers' Party of South Korea to become today's "Workers' Party of Korea".) was formalised. In the 1946–1947 elections to people's committees, village people's committees and myŏn people's committees, about 5.3 percent of the 70,454 elected deputies belonged to the Chondoist Chongu Party. Kim Tarhyon became one of two deputy chairmen of the People's Assembly (the national parliament). During the first session of the People's Assembly, a Chondoist Chongu Party deputy, Kim Yun-gol (김윤걸), held a critical speech against the non-compliance with laws passed by the people's committees during the land reform process. Kim Yun-gol was fiercely attacked, and he retracted his statement.

When the Democratic People's Republic of Korea (DPRK) was constituted in 1948, the Chondoist Chongu Party obtained 16.5 percent of the seats in the Supreme People's Assembly. However, the situation for the party soon turned difficult. Large sections of the Soviet and North Korean communist leaderships did not trust the party, and saw it as a potential nest for counterrevolutionaries. The most troublesome issue was that the North Korean Ch'ŏndogyo continued to have contacts with the leadership of the religious group in South Korean Seoul. There, the Ch'ŏndogyo leadership was anti-communist and supported the administration of President Syngman Rhee. In January 1948, the Ch'ŏndogyo leadership based in Seoul made a decision that a massive anti-communist demonstration would be held on 1 March in Pyongyang. This put the Chondoist Chongu Party in the North in a precarious situation. Kim Tarhyon refused to follow the orders from Seoul, but others in the party leadership wanted to go ahead with the plans. The result was a massive purge of party members throughout North Korea. In its aftermath, the anti-communist sections of the movement initiated an underground resistance movement and tried to launch guerrilla warfare.

Kim Tarhyon and the people around him reaffirmed their loyalty to the DPRK. In 1950, the Chondoist Chongu Party in the South (but not the religious movement) united with the Northern party under his leadership. During the Korean War the headquarters of the party was shifted to a town near the border with China. The party leadership actively supported the DPRK war efforts, but many party cadres migrated to South Korea during the war. Many sided with Seoul during the war. In the aftermath of the war, the idea of the united front was increasingly unpopular in the North Korean government circles, and many wanted the non-communist parties banned. In the end, the united front was maintained, but the possibility of the Chondoist Chongu Party conducting political activity was severely curtailed.

In 1954, the government cancelled the party's subsidies. By 1956, approximately 1,700–3,000 members were left (out of the 10,000–50,000 remaining Ch'ŏndogyo believers). At the same time, about 200 persons were full-time employees of the party. To finance the party, it ran an iron foundry and a printing house. In September 1957, Kim Tarhyon became a minister without portfolio.

In 1958, the party was purged again. In November of that year, sources alleged that it had, together with the Korean Democratic Party, conspired against the DPRK leadership. Kim Tarhyon and his closest associates were arrested. By February 1958 they had pleaded guilty, and on 16 February 1958 their parliamentary immunity was revoked. Most likely they were executed, but their exact fate remains unknown. By this time the party had effectively ceased to function as an independent entity. No provincial organization of the party existed, just a formal central nucleus. Pak Sindok, previously the head of the Organizational Department of the party, took over the party leadership.

The party obtained 22 out of 687 seats in the Supreme People's Assembly in the 2014 election.

After the disbandment of the Fatherland Front alliance in 2024, the party runs under the "Friendly parties and religious organizations" umbrella in North Korean elections.

== Organization ==
The party is headquartered in the capital Pyongyang. In 1986, the former South Korean foreign minister Choe Deok-sin defected to the North, becoming a leader of the Chondoist Chongu Party. In 2001 and 2012, the chairwoman of the party's central committee was Ryu Mi-yong. She was also a member of the presidium of the Supreme People's Assembly (as of 2014), chairwoman of the Central Guidance Committee of the Chondoist Association of Korea (in 2010) and chairwoman of the Council for the Reunification of Tangun's Nation (in 2012). Ryu died in November 2016, leaving the post vacant. As of 2019, the vice chairman of the party's central committee was Ri Myong-chol. He was preceded by Yun Jong-ho. (Note: 윤정호; 尹正浩; Yun Chŏngho. He is also vice chairman of the Central Guidance Committee of the Chondoist Association of Korea (as of 2014; 2011: Kang Chol-won) and vice chairman of the Council for the Reunification of Tangun's Nation (as of 2014; 2012: Kang Chol Won).) As of 2021 Ri is the central committee chairman.

According to the U.S. Central Intelligence Agency in 2006, the party remains under the control of the Workers' Party of Korea.

== Foreign relations ==
The Chondoist Chongu Party is sometimes invoked in North Korean propaganda targeting foreigners, but much less so than the Korean Social Democratic Party. The reason is that Ch'ŏndogyo has fallen into relative obscurity even in South Korea, while social democracy continues to be an accepted political ideology abroad.

== Election results ==
Supreme People's Assembly elections
Election	Seats	+/–
1948	35 / 572	▲35
1957	11 / 215	▼24
1962	4 / 383	▼7
1967	4 / 457	Steady
1972	4 / 541	Steady
1977	—N/a	—N/a
1982	—N/a	—N/a
1986	—N/a	—N/a
1990	22 / 687	
1998	23 / 687	▲1
2003	—N/a	—N/a
2009	22 / 687	
2014	22 / 687	Steady
2019	—N/a	—N/a
2026	—N/a	—N/a

== See also ==
- Korean Social Democratic Party
- List of political parties in North Korea

== Other sources ==
- Lankov, Andrei N. (Winter 2001). "The Demise of Non-Communist Parties in North Korea (1945–1960)". Journal of Cold War Studies. 3 (1): 103–125. doi:10.1162/15203970151032164. S2CID 57570755.
