= DFRF =

DFRF may refer to:

- Dryden Flight Research Center
- Democratic Front for the Reunification of the Fatherland
