= 平安南道 =

平安南道 may refer to:

- Heian'nan-dō
- South Pyongan Province
