= Kim Kwang-jin =

Kim Kwang-jin (Korean: 김광진) is the name of:

- Kim Kwang-jin (politician) (1927–1997), North Korean general and politician
- Kim Gwang-jin (born 1956), North Korean gymnast
- Kim Kwang-jin (skier) (born 1995), South Korean skier
