= Jon Jae-son =

North Korean general (born 1940)

- Supreme Leader: Kim Jong Il

Personal details
- Born: 1940 Korea, Empire of Japan
- Party: Workers' Party of Korea
- Education: Kim Il Sung Military University

Military service
- Allegiance: North Korea
- Branch/service: Korean People's Army
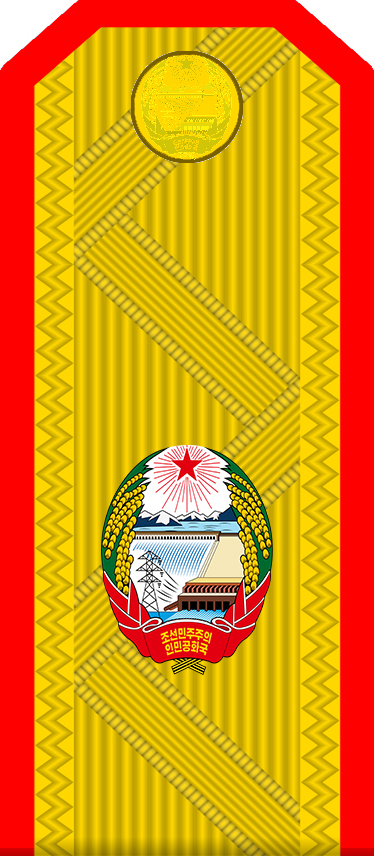
- Rank: Ch'asu (Vice Marshal)

Jon Jae-son (Korean: 전재선; Hanja: 全載善 or 全在善; born 1940) is an army general and politician of North Korea. He is Vice Marshal of the Korean People's Army.

== Biography ==
Born in 1940 during the Japanese colonial rule, he graduated from Kim Il Sung Military University. In August 1981, he served as Deputy Chief of General Staff Department of the Korean People's Army, and was promoted to the commander V Corps in 1985.

In February 1986, at the 11th plenum meeting of the 6th Central Committee of the Workers' Party of Korea, he was elected as a candidate member for the Central Committee of the Party. In April 1992, he was promoted to Captain of the People's Army, and in February 1994, he served as the General of the People's Army. In 1997 he was promoted to the rank of Vice Marshal. In September 2010, he was dismissed as a party commissioner.
