= 1972 North Korean local elections =

Elections to provincial, city, county and district people's assemblies were held in North Korea on December 12, 1972.

In the elections, 3,185 provincial people's assembly deputies, and 24,784 city, county and district people's assembly deputies were elected.

Voter turnout was reported as 100%, with candidates receiving a 100% approval rate.

The elections were held synchronously with the election to the fifth Supreme People's Assembly.
