= Democratic Front for the Reunification of Korea =

North Korean popular front

- Established: 25 June 1949; 77 years ago
- Founder: Kim Il Sung
- Dissolved: 23 March 2024; 2 years ago
- Headquarters: Pyongyang, North Korea
- Region served: Korea
- Director: Maeng Kyong Il (last)

Korean name
- Hangul: 조국통일민주주의전선
- Hanja: 祖國統一民主主義戰線
- RR: Joguk tongil minjujuui jeonseon
- MR: Choguk t'ongil minjujuŭi chŏnsŏn

The Democratic Front for the Reunification of Korea (DFRK), also known as the Democratic Front for the Reunification of the Fatherland (DFRF) or the Fatherland Front, was a North Korean united front formed on 25 June 1949 and led by the Workers' Party of Korea (WPK).

It had the goal of promoting the peaceful reunification of Korea under the government of North Korea. It was initially formed as the Fatherland United Democratic Front and was founded on 25 June 1949. The front initially consisted of 72 parties and social organizations from both the North and the South; at the time of its dissolution, it had 24 members. The three legal political parties of North Korea—the WPK, the Korean Social Democratic Party, and the Chondoist Chongu Party—all participated in the front. The country's four most important mass organizations—the Socialist Patriotic Youth League, Socialist Women's Union of Korea, General Federation of Trade Unions of Korea, and Union of Agricultural Workers of Korea—were member organizations. The Korean Children's Union was also a member organization.

All candidates for an elected office in North Korea had to be a member of the front, and were nominated and approved at mass meetings held by the front. The WPK led the front and all other member organizations were subservient to it. The WPK was thus able to predetermine the composition of the Supreme People's Assembly (SPA). Though initially a popular front, by the 1950s, the DFRK's functions had mainly turned into becoming a body handling relations with South Korea. The Anti-Imperialist National Democratic Front is ostensibly the South Korean counterpart to the DFRK, but it operates from North Korea. The DFRK was dissolved on 23 March 2024, following North Korean leader Kim Jong Un's announcement that North Korea would abandon Korean reunification.

== History ==
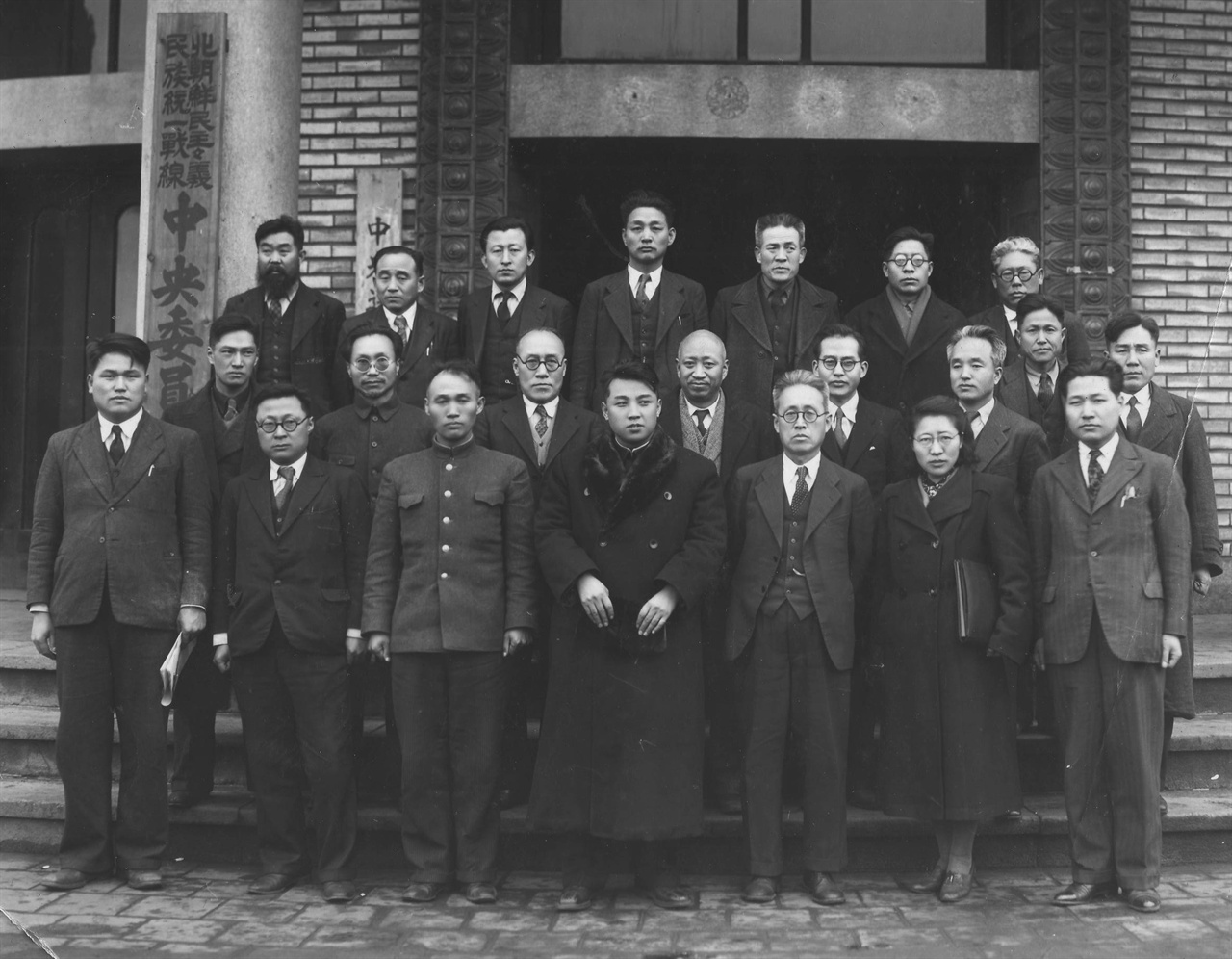
Members of the North Korean National Democratic Front in front of the organization's complex, June 1947. Future North Korean supreme leader Kim Il Sung is standing in the center of the front row, alongside Choe Yong-gon, Kim Chaek, Kim Tal-hyon, Ho Jong-suk and Yi Kang-guk

The National Democratic Front (민주주의민족전선), a South Korean leftist organization, was founded with the Communist Party of Korea as its leading organization on 15 February 1946. It was formed from 40 leftist parties and consisted of 398 communists led by Lyuh Woon-hyung, Pak Hon-yong, and Ho Hon. The North Korean National Democratic Front (북조선 민주주의 민족통일전선) was founded on 22 July 1946. It was formed from 13 parties and organizations and led by Kim Il Sung, Kim Tu-bong, and Choe Yong-gon. It included the North Korean Branch of the Communist Party and the New People's Party of Korea, which were soon merged to form the Workers' Party of North Korea, as well as the Korean Democratic Party and the Chondoist Chongu Party. The North Korean National Democratic Front absorbed the South Korean National Democratic Front on 25 June 1949, after South Korea outlawed the latter, leading to the establishment of the Fatherland United Democratic Front.

In the 1950s, the front outlived its original role as a way for the Workers' Party to consolidate its power. It was therefore assigned a new role; to serve as body to interact with South Korean organizations and political parties. It consequently changed the English rendering name to the Democratic Front for the Reunification of Korea (DFRK). According to North Korea expert Andrei Lankov, in this capacity, the DFRK "handled relations with South Korea's assorted progressive groups while also serving as a quasi-official voice of the North Korean government on matters related to the South".

In 2018, the DFRK was led by Pak Myong Chol. Presidium members during that time included Ri Kil Song and Kim Wan Su. On 23 March 2024, the Korean Central News Agency reported that the DFRK had officially dissolved its central committee, effectively dissolving the whole front. The move followed a speech by Kim Jong Un in which he stated that the North would give up its goal of peaceful reunification with the South and dissolve all organizations related to the goal. At the time of its dissolution, the Director of the Secretariat of the Central Committee of the DFRK was Maeng Kyong Il. Members of the Presidium of the Central Committee included Pak Myong Chol and Kim Wan Su.

== Member organizations ==
=== In the SPA ===
Name (abbreviation)	Emblem	Ideology	Leader	Foundation	Seats in the SPA (2014)	Ref
Workers' Party of Korea 조선로동당; Chosŏn Rodongdang		Kimilsungism–Kimjongilism	Kim Jong Un	24 June 1949	607 / 687	
Korean Social Democratic Party 조선사회민주당; Chosŏn Sahoe Minjudang		Social democracy (de jure)	Kim Ho-chol	3 November 1945	50 / 687	
Chondoist Chongu Party 천도교청우당; Ch'ŏndogyo Ch'ŏngudang		Chondoist interests	Ri Myong-chol	8 February 1946	22 / 687	
Chongryon 총련		Zainichi interests	Pak Ku-ho	25 May 1955	6 / 687	

=== With SPA observer status ===
Organization	Emblem	Korean name	Foundation	Ref
Socialist Patriotic Youth League		사회주의애국청년동맹	17 January 1946	
Socialist Women's Union of Korea		조선사회주의녀성동맹	18 November 1945	
General Federation of Trade Unions of Korea		조선직업총동맹	30 November 1945	
Union of Agricultural Workers of Korea		조선농업근로자동맹	31 January 1946	
Korean Children's Union		조선소년단	6 June 1946	
Korean Journalists' Union		조선기자동맹	10 February 1946	
Korean Federation of Literature and Arts		조선문학예술총동맹	25 March 1946	
Korean Christian Federation		조선그리스도교연맹	28 November 1946	
Korean Catholic Association		조선카톨릭교협회	30 June 1988	
Korea Buddhist Federation		조선불교도련맹	26 December 1945	
Chosun Cheondogyo Central Guidance Committee		조선천도교중앙지도위원회	1 February 1946	

== Electoral history ==
=== Supreme People's Assembly elections ===
Election	% of votes	Seats	+/−	Position	Government
1948	98.49%	572 / 572	▲572	▲1st	Sole legal coalition under the control of WPK
1957	99.92%	215 / 215	▼357	1st	Sole legal coalition under the control of WPK
1962	100%	383 / 383	▲168	1st	Sole legal coalition under the control of WPK
1967	100%	457 / 457	▲74	1st	Sole legal coalition under the control of WPK
1972	100%	541 / 541	▲84	1st	Sole legal coalition under the control of WPK
1977	100%	579 / 579	▲38	1st	Sole legal coalition under the control of WPK
1982	100%	615 / 615	▲36	1st	Sole legal coalition under the control of WPK
1986	100%	655 / 655	▲40	1st	Sole legal coalition under the control of WPK
1990	100%	687 / 687	▲32	1st	Sole legal coalition under the control of WPK
1998	100%	687 / 687	Steady	1st	Sole legal coalition under the control of WPK
2003	100%	687 / 687	Steady	1st	Sole legal coalition under the control of WPK
2009	100%	687 / 687	Steady	1st	Sole legal coalition under the control of WPK
2014	100%	687 / 687	Steady	1st	Sole legal coalition under the control of WPK
2019	100%	687 / 687	Steady	1st	Sole legal coalition under the control of WPK

== See also ==
- Elections in North Korea
- List of political parties in North Korea
