= Kim Tal-hyon (independence activist) =

North Korean politician (1884–1958)

Kim Tal-Hyon
- 김달현
- Born: July 24, 1884; South Hamgyong Province, Joseon
- Died: December 1958 (aged 74)
- Citizenship: North Korean
- Political party: Chondoist Chongu Party

Kim Tal-Hyon (Korean: 김달현; 24 July 1884 – December 1958) was a North Korean politician and independence activist.

== Biography ==
He was born on July 24, 1884, in Dongsan-Ri, Gyeongwon-Myeon, Kyongwon County, South Hamgyong Province, Joseon. In July of either 1903 or 1907, he joined Chondoism at the recommendation of Lee Ki-Wan, a fellow Chondoist. In 1919, he took part in the March 1st Movement and led the demonstration for national independence in the Gyeongwon-Gun area, and was subsequently arrested. In April 1948, at the second party congress of the Chondoist Chongu Party, Kim Tal-Hyon was re-elected as chairman again. In addition, a coalition government was established to some extent, such as appointing the vice-chairman of the provincial, city, and county people's committees to the Chondogyo Chongu Party. However, as the grip of the Workers' Party of Korea over the political process intensified, this brief coalition quickly collapsed. Kim Tal-Hyon was appointed chairman of the Fatherland Front in 1949. After the outbreak of the Korean War, the North Korean leadership retreated to Kanggye and returned to Pyongyang in 1951 due to the participation of the People's Volunteer Army. After the death of Ho Hon, chairman of the Supreme People's Assembly in 1951, he was appointed to his funeral committee and replaced him as acting chairman of the Supreme People's Assembly. In January 1953, he served as a member of the funeral service committee of Kim Jong-Ju, who was his close aide and leading official of the Chondoist Chongu Party. On December 22, 1953, he transferred the chairmanship position to Ri Yong at the 1st 6th session of the Supreme People's Assembly, and was recalled from the vice-chairman and moved to the Cabinet as minister without portfolio. After that, he participated in various gatherings as a puppet of the North Korean regime, and in 1957 he was re-elected as a deputy to the 2nd convocation of the Supreme People's Assembly, and retained his position as minister without portfolio in the Cabinet. In December 1958, he was purged following espionage accusations.
