= Ri Tu-ik =

North Korean politician (1921–2002)

- 리두익

Member of the WPK Central Military Commission
- Leader: Kim Il Sung

Personal details
- Born: 1921 Jilin, China
- Died: 13 March 2002 (aged 80–81) Pyongyang, North Korea
- Citizenship: North Korean
- Party: Workers' Party of Korea

Military service
- Allegiance: North Korea
- Branch/service: Korean People's Army
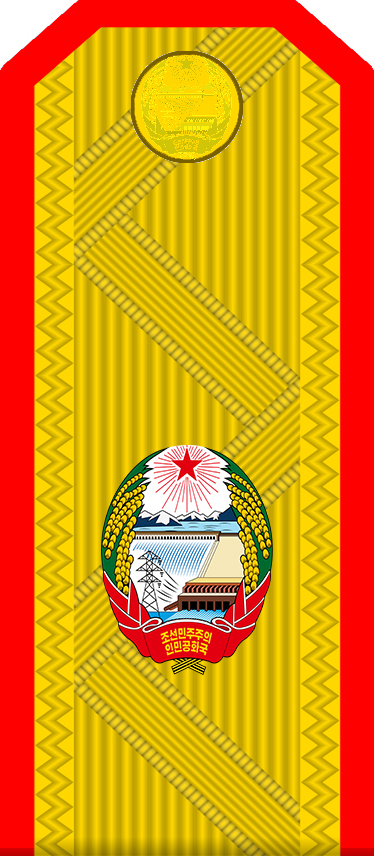
- Rank: Ch'asu (Vice Marshal)
- Battles/wars: Chinese Civil War; Korean Independence Movement; World War II; Korean War

Ri Tu-ik (Korean: 리두익/李斗益; born 1921 in Jilin, China - died March 13, 2002, in Pyongyang) was a North Korean politician of the Workers' Party of Korea and Vice-Marshal of the Korean People's Army, who was a member of the Central Military Commission of the Workers' Party of Korea.

== Biography ==
Ri Tu-ik joined Kim Il Sung's partisan struggle in the late 1930s and was part of his security escort. After training in guerrilla warfare in northeast China, as a member of the 88th Special Reconnaissance Brigade (Russian: 88-я отдельная стрелковая бригада) of the Red Army, he led reconnaissance missions against the Japanese occupation forces in Jilin and North Hamgyong Province. In 1945 he was first platoon leader and then in 1948 company commander in the security escort of Kim Il Sung.

During the Korean War, known in North Korea as "Victorious Liberation of the Fatherland", Ri was commander of a battalion in 1951 and then completed military training between 1954 and 1958 in the areas of joint warfare and special operations in the Soviet Union. On his return in 1958 he became commander of the 3rd regiment and later deputy commander of the 9th Division, before being appointed commander of the 9th Division in 1962. On October 8, 1962, he was also elected for the first time as a deputy of the Supreme People's Assembly. In 1963 he was promoted to lieutenant general and appointed head of the operations department of the General Staff of the Korean People's Army. He then acted as the commanding general of the VII Army Corps between 1965 and 1973 and was an adviser to the Viet Cong, the National Front for the Liberation of South Vietnam, during the Vietnam War between 1967 and 1968.

At the end of the 1968s Ri Tu-ik had a significant share in purges within the Korean People's Army and was promoted to Colonel General in 1968. At the fifth party congress of the WPK in 1970 he became a member of the WPK Central Committee for the first time. After he was the commander of the 2nd Army Group between 1973 and 1976, he served as the commanding general of the 2nd Army Corps from 1977 to 1980 and then became the commanding general of the 4th Army Corps in 1980. On the 6th party congress, which took place in Pyongyang from October 10–14, 1980, he was also elected a member of the Central Military Commission. He was promoted to general in 1985 and served as commanding general of the Pyongyang Defense Command from the late 1980s to 1992.

Ri was promoted to Vice Marshal on April 20, 1992, and remained active in political life as a member of the Central Military Commission and Kim Jong Il's adviser even after the death of Kim Il Sung and his son Kim Jong Il's ascending to power in 1994. After undergoing medical treatment in the People's Republic of China in 1997, he ceased to appear in public after 1999. He died death on March 13, 2002, and was buried on March 15, 2002, in the Revolutionary Martyrs' Cemetery on Mount Taesongsan.
