= Cho Myong-son =

North Korean politician (1923–1994)

- 조명선

6th Central Committee of the Workers' Party of Korea
- In office 14 October 1980 – ?

5th Supreme People's Assembly
- In office 25 December 1972 – 17 December 1977

Personal details
- Born: November 27, 1923 Yodok County, Kankyōnan-dō, Korea, Empire of Japan
- Died: July 8, 1994 (aged 70)
- Resting place: Revolutionary Martyrs' Cemetery
- Party: Workers' Party of Korea
- Awards: Order of the National Flag, 1st class Hero of the Republic (1992); Order of Kim Il Sung (1972, 1982)

Korean name
- Hangul: 조명선
- Hanja: 趙明善
- RR: Jo Myeongseon
- MR: Cho Myŏngsŏn

General Cho Myong-son (Korean: 조명선; 27 November 1923 – 8 July 1994) was a North Korean official. He was a former guerilla fighter in the Korean independence movement.

== Career ==
Prior to liberation from Japan, he was an anti-Japanese partisan and fought alongside Kim Il Sung, as a messenger. He had enlisted in the Korean Peoples' Revolutionary Army in June 1937. Although he was initially unfamiliar with guerilla warfare and the forests, he adapted to the harsh conditions, and conducted numerous reconnaissance missions against the Japanese, which earned Kim's trust. In 1945, he became a battalion commander, and in August 1950, he became a division commander. It is unknown when he was further promoted.

In With the Century, he was named as a bodyguard who protected Kim during the anti-Japanese warfare and was described as extremely loyal. Due to his loyalty and his command skills, he was promoted to higher positions in the army. He was commended also for responsibly using the army for socialist construction after the Korean War and devoted to strengthening the army.

He was a candidate to the 5th Central Committee of the Workers' Party of Korea and elected to the 5th Supreme People's Assembly in December 1972. In the same year, he received his first Order of Kim Il Sung, followed by another in 1982.

In 1980, he was elected as a full member to the 6th Central Committee of the WPK.

He became the deputy director of the Ministry of Social Security in 1982 and in 1989, the principal of Kang Kon Military Academy.

== Death ==
Cho Myong-son died on the same day as Kim Il Sung. His death was announced on July 24 and was described as 'unexpected'. He was buried at the Revolutionary Martyrs' Cemetery and a bust of him was erected at his grave. Condolences were delivered from both Kim Il Sung and Kim Jong Il in a funeral in Potonggang-guyok, the last person to receive condolences from Kim Il Sung.
