= Chasu =

Military rank in North Korea

Ch'asu Vice-Marshal
- Shoulder boards for the rank of Ch'asu
- Country: North Korea
- Service branch: Korean People's Army
- Formation: 1953
- Next higher rank: Wonsu
- Next lower rank: Daejang

- Chasu
- Hangul: 차수
- Hanja: 次帥
- RR: chasu
- MR: ch'asu

Ch'asu (Korean: 차수; Hanja: 次帥) is a superior military rank of North Korea, often translated as Vice Marshal. The rank is senior to that of Daejang (General) and junior to that of Wonsu (Marshal). The rank is seldom bestowed upon the professional military, and appears to be rather a combined political-military position.

The insignia for a chasu is superimposing a North Korean national crest upon a marshal's insignia star in the shoulder epaulette. Formerly, insignia for such rank holders was the emblem of North Korea until the present insignia was released in 1985.

The rank is often transliterated as ch'asu, showing the difference with the Korean word for embroidery, usually transliterated as chasu (자수).

== List of North Korean vice-marshals ==
Vice Marshal of the Democratic People's Republic of Korea 조선민주주의인민공화국 차수
Vice Marshal	Date of promotion	Notes
Choe Yong-gon 최용건; 1900–1976	7 February 1953	
Vice Marshal of the Korean People's Army 조선인민군 차수
Vice Marshal	Date of promotion	Notes
O Jin-u 오진우; 1917–1995	14 April 1985	Promoted to Marshal of the Korean People's Army on 20 April 1992.
Ju To-il 주도일; 1922–1994	20 April 1992	
Ri Ul-sol 리을설; 1921–2015	20 April 1992	Promoted to Marshal of the Korean People's Army on 8 October 1995.
Choe Kwang 최광; 1918–1997	20 April 1992	Promoted to Marshal of the Korean People's Army on 8 October 1995.
Choe In-dok 최인덕; 1920–2003	20 April 1992	
Paek Hak-rim 백학림; 1918–2006	20 April 1992	
Ri Tu-ik 리두익; 1921–2002	20 April 1992	
Kim Pong-ryul 김봉률; 1917–1995	20 April 1992	
Kim Kwang-jin 김광진; 1927–1997	20 April 1992	
Kim Ik-hyon 김익현; 1916–2009	15 April 1994	
Jo Myong-rok 조명록; 1928–2010	8 October 1995	Promoted from Air Force
Ri Ha-il 리하일; 1935–2010	8 October 1995	
Kim Yong-chun 김영춘; 1936–2018	8 October 1995	Promoted to Marshal of the Korean People's Army on 14 April 2016.
Kim Il-chol 김일철; 1933–2023	13 April 1997	Promoted from People's Navy
Jon Jae-son 전재선 born 1940	13 April 1997	
Pak Ki-so 박기서; 1929–2010	13 April 1997	
Ri Jong-san 리종산; 1922–2011	13 April 1997	
Kim Ryong-yon 김룡연; 1916–2008	7 September 1998	
Ri Yong-mu 리용무; 1925–2022	7 September 1998	
Jang Song-u 장성우; 1933–2009	13 April 2002	
Ri Yong-ho 리영호 born 1942	27 September 2010	
Kim Jong-gak 김정각 born 1941	15 February 2012	
Choe Ryong-hae 최룡해 born 1950	7 April 2012	
Hyon Chol-hae 현철해; 1934–2022	7 April 2012	Promoted to Marshal of the Korean People's Army on 14 April 2016.
Hyon Yong-chol 현영철; 1949–2015	16 July 2012	Demoted to Army General in October 2012.
Hwang Pyong-so 황병서 born 1949	26 April 2014	
Ri Myong-su 리명수 born 1934	14 April 2016	
Pak Jong-chon 박정천	23 May 2020	Promoted to Marshal of the Korean People's Army on 5 October 2020. Since demoted back to Chasu and repromoted back to Wonsu.
Kim Jong-gwan 김정관	24 February 2021	Demoted to Army General in June 2021.
Kwon Yong-jin 권영진	24 February 2021	Demoted to Army General by February 2022.
Ri Yong-gil 리명수 born 1955	14 April 2022	
