= Hero of the Republic =

North Korean title of honor

Hero of the Republic 공화국영웅
- Type: Honorific title
- Country: North Korea
- Presented by: Democratic People's Republic of Korea
- Campaign: Korean War (initial)
- Status: Active
- Established: 30 June 1950

Highlights
- Total: At least 6116
- Total awarded posthumously: Kim Jong-suk soldiers of KPA and CVF killed in action soldiers of Overseas Operation Units killed in action

Precedence
- Next (higher): None or Order of Kim Il Sung
- Next (lower): Hero of Labour
- Related: Order of the National Flag (1st class)

- Hero of the Republic
- Hangul: 공화국영웅
- Hanja: 共和國英雄
- RR: Gonghwaguk yeongung
- MR: Konghwaguk yŏngung

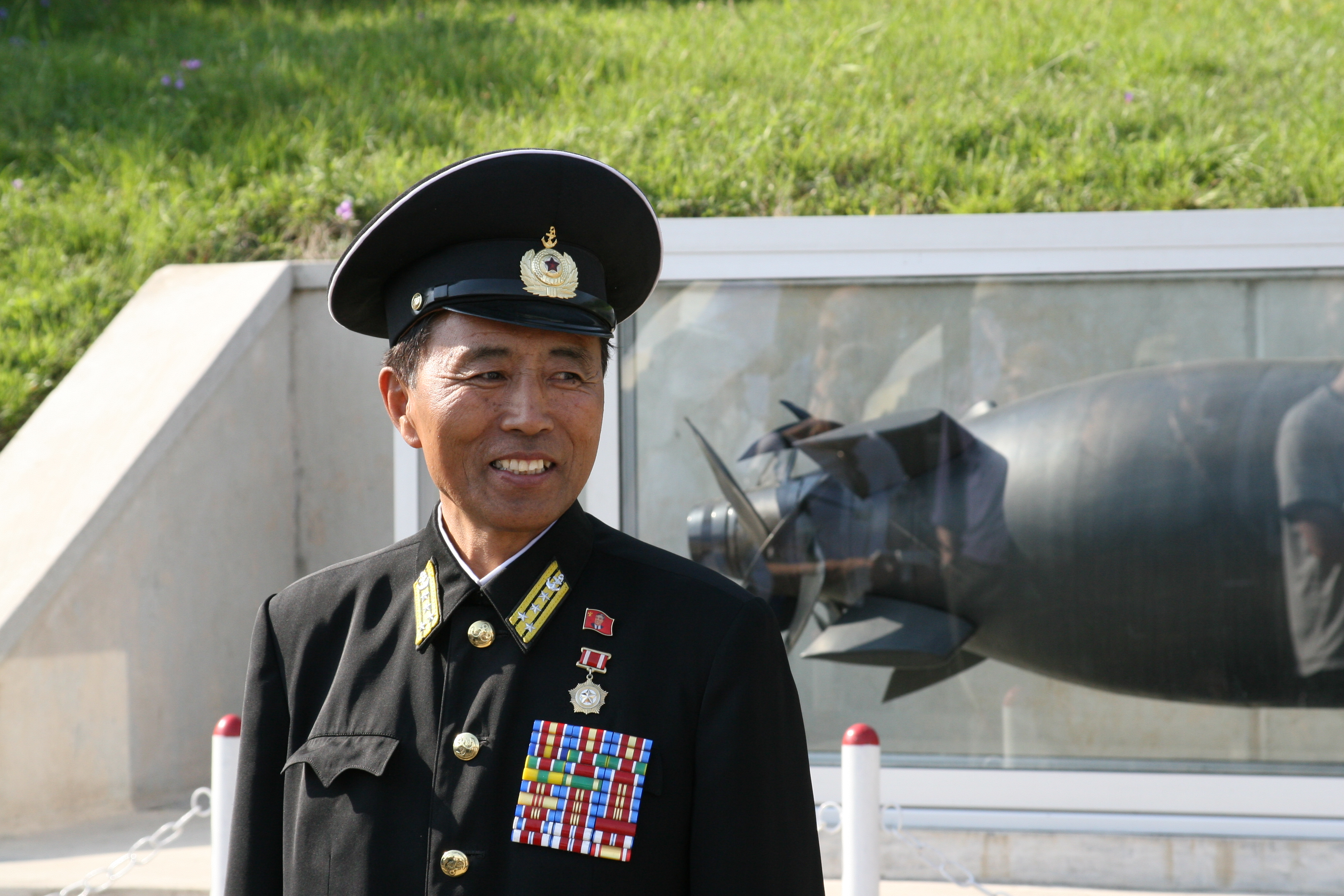
A Korean People's Navy daechwa (senior captain) wearing a Hero of the Republic award.

Hero of the Republic (Korean: 공화국영웅) is a North Korean honorific title. It was created on 30 June 1950 as Hero of the Korean People's Republic (조선인민공화국영웅). It was the first title created in the country. Despite having been created just five days after the Korean War broke out, the connection seems incidental. 533 people were awarded Hero of the Republic during the war, and many more since then.

Since there is no agreed upon order of precedence of North Korean titles, orders, and medals, it is not possible to definitively establish the rank of Hero of the Republic. According to Yonhap's North Korea Handbook, Hero of the Republic ranks below the Order of Kim Il Sung but above the Hero of Labor. Martin Weiser, however, ranks Hero of Labor the highest.

The medal was designed by Jong Chon-pa, who also designed the Hero of Labor, Order of the National Flag and others, including the Emblem of North Korea.

== Recipients ==
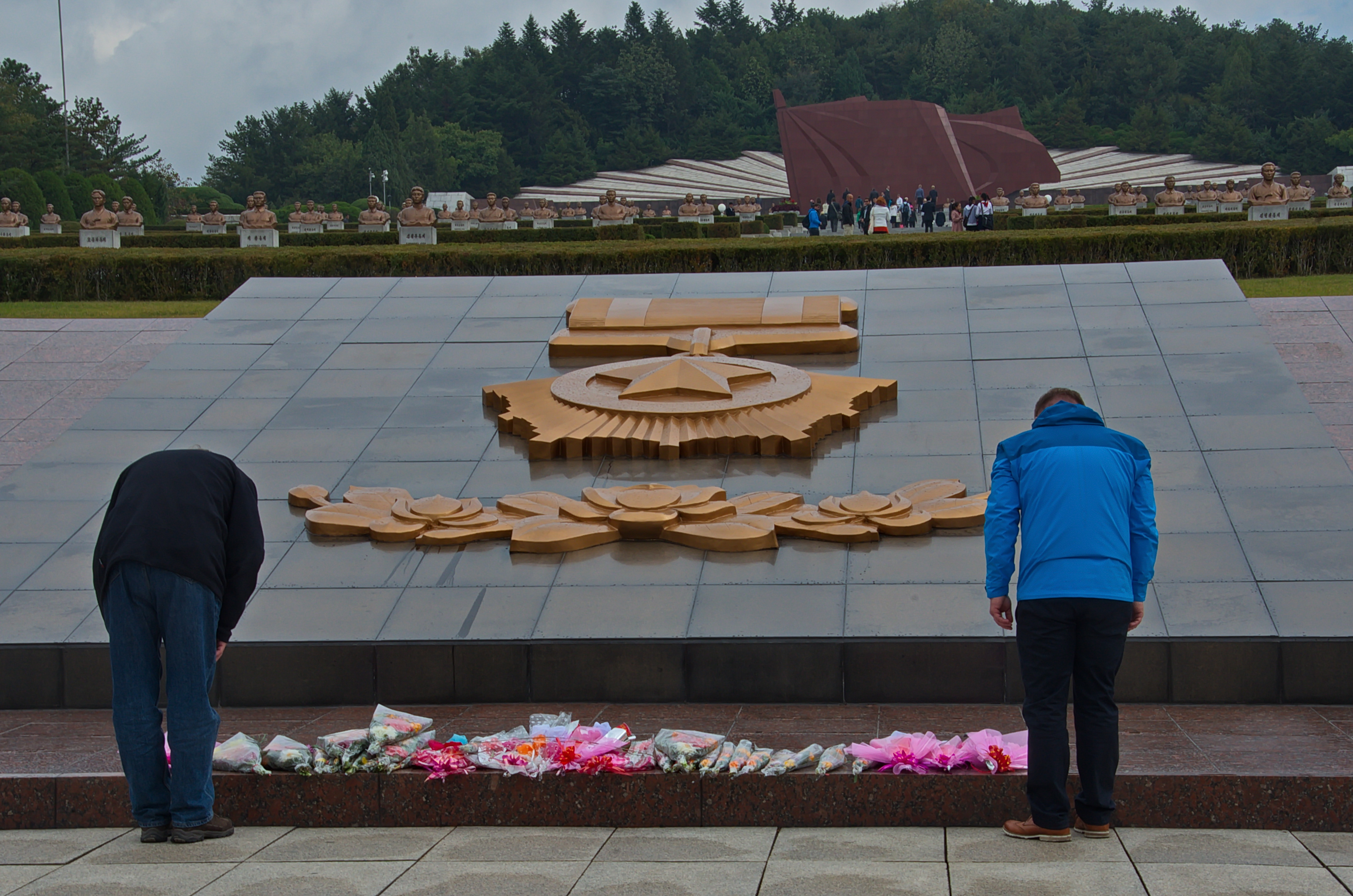
Relief depicting the award at Revolutionary Martyrs' Cemetery

Since there are too many recipients, only those with Wikipedia articles are listed.

- Kim Il-chol
- Paek Hak-rim, awarded October 1988
- Kim Chol-man first awarded September 1968, Deputy Chief of Staff of the Korean People's Army; later key member of the Central Military Commission, the Politburo, and the National Defence Commission, double hero April 1992
- Choe Ryong-hae (1993), first secretary of the Kimilsungist-Kimjongilist Youth League and Central Committee member; later President of the Presidium of the Supreme People's Assembly and First Vice Chairman of the State Affairs Commission
- Army Marshal O Jin-u was made a Hero of the Republic in (February 1968) and Double Hero (February 1992).
- Choe Hyon, commander of the North Korean II Corps and Minister of People's Armed Forces
- Kim Jong-suk (posthumous), wife of Kim Il Sung and Communist anti-Japanese guerrilla fighter
- Jong Song-ok, gold medalist in the 1999 World Championships in Athletics Women's Marathon in Seville, awarded 1999.
- Lee Kwon-mu, Korean People's Army lieutenant general and commander of the North Korean 3rd Division during the Battle of Taejon
- Kim Il Sung, 1st Supreme Leader of North Korea, (thrice: August 1953, April 1972, April 1982)
- Kim Jong Il, 2nd Supreme Leader of North Korea, (four times: 1975, 1982, 1992, and 2011)
- Peng Dehuai, Yuan Shuai of the People's Liberation Army and commander of the People's Volunteer Army during the Korean War
- Choe Kwang, first awarded February 1968, double hero April 1992.
- Josip Broz Tito, President of Yugoslavia (25 August 1977)
- Fidel Castro, Prime Minister and President of Cuba, (March 1986)
- Ziaur Rahman, President of Bangladesh
- Choe Chun-sik
- Ri Tu-ik, General of the Korean People's Army, first awarded June 1968, double hero February 1992.
- Kim Kwang-chol
- Chon Mun-sop, first awarded November 1969, double hero April 1992.
- Kang Kon, killed in Korean War, awarded September 1950.
- Cho Myong-son, buried in the Revolutionary Martyrs' Cemetery, awarded 1992, also double recipient of Order of Kim Il Sung.
- Choe In-dok, first awarded October 1970, double hero February 1992.
- Kim Chaek, awarded 1968.
- So Chol, awarded April 1992.
- Kang Tong-yun, unknown when awarded.
- Kim Yong-ju, unknown when awarded.
- Kang Ki-sop, unknown when awarded.
- Muammar Gaddafi, De facto leader of Libya, (1982)
- Pang Ho-san, then Deputy Commander of the West Coast Command and concurrently Commander of V Corps, twice awarded during the Korean War.

== See also ==
- Orders and medals of North Korea
