= Pyongyang Defense Command =

North Korean military command

- 평양방위사령부
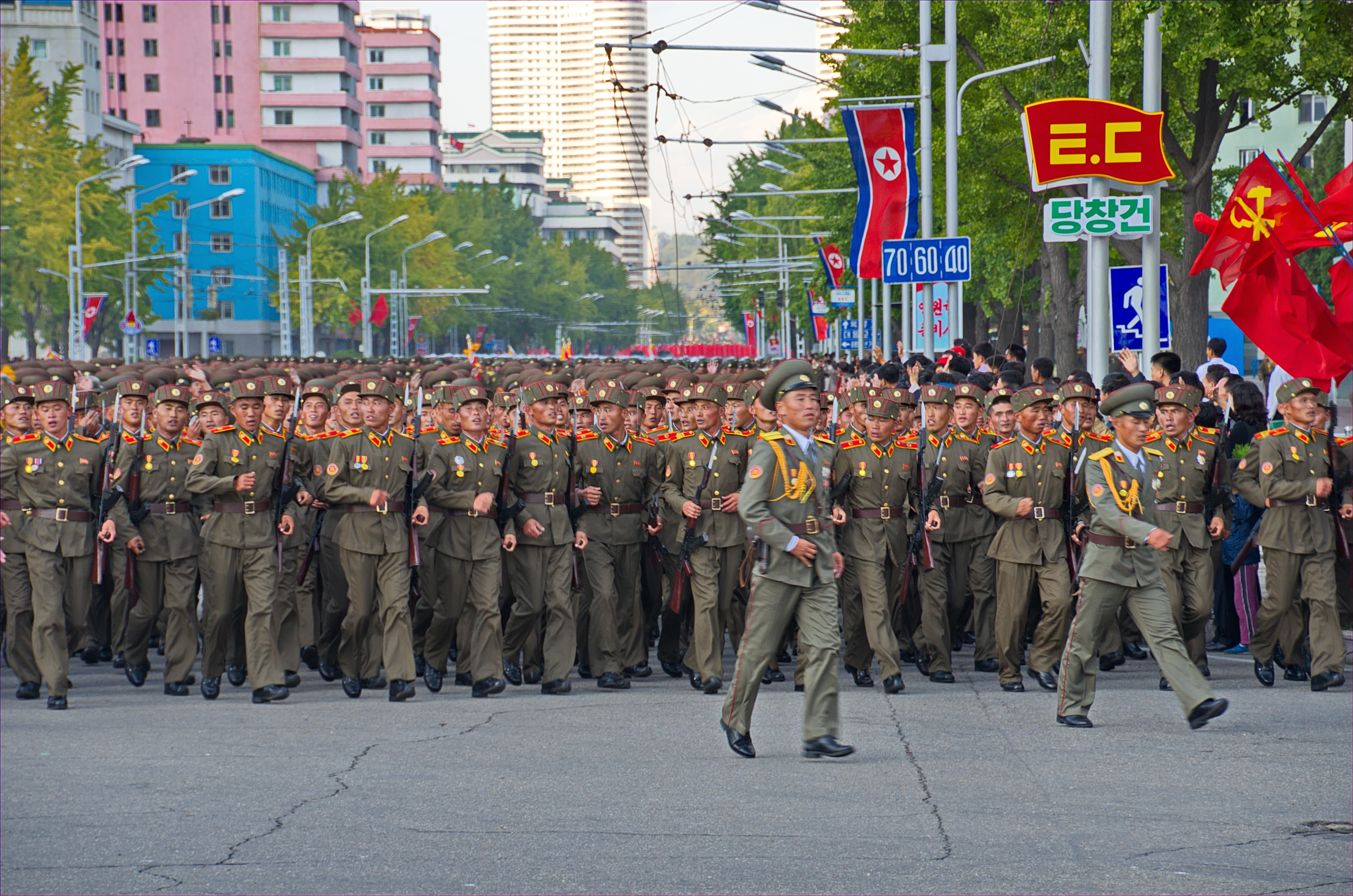
- Troops of the PDC during a parade in 2015
- Active: 1955-Present
- Country: North Korea
- Type: Homeland Defense
- Part of: General Staff Department of the Korean People's Army

The Pyongyang Defence Command (Korean: 평양방위사령부), also known as the Pyongyang Defense Corps, is a military area and corps of the Korean People's Army based out of the North Korean capital of Pyongyang.

The PDC is composed of 70,000 KPA personnel who, alongside the Supreme Guard Command and the III Corps, are responsible for the defense of the capital. According to North Korea analyst Joseph F. Bermudez, the command operates, unlike its two counterparts, inside the Pyongyang area.

It reports directly to the General Staff Department and is considered to be one of the many levers of power in the KPA.

== History ==
The command was established under the Ministry of National Defence (now the Ministry of People's Armed Forces) in 1955 with the aim of defending the national capital from the South Korean Army and the Eighth United States Army following the UN offensive into North Korea. It was incorporated into the KPA order of precedence command in the 1960s and became independent 30 years later in the 1990s. In the 1980s, it reported to Unit 963, but was later removed from its order of battle.

The 2014 Defense White Paper, published by the ministry on 21 December 2012, said the Pyongyang Defense Command subordinated artillery units were transferred to the General Staff Department of the KPA to unify the artillery command system.

A notable commander of the command was Vice Marshal Ri Yong-ho, who commanded it from 2003 to 2009 and later became the KPA Chief of the General Staff. He was the last person known to have commanded the PDC. Another notable commander was Pak Ki So who was the predecessor to Ri who served from 1995 to 2003.

== Duties ==
It is primarily responsible for the protection of the capital and its state and party assets. The command utilizes the Youth Hero Motorway as a military route for the southern DPRK alongside the III Army Corps. During a potential Coup d'état or a foreign invasion, tank divisions are deployed to the highway to cut off access to the capital.

The airspace of the capital is defended by the Pyongyang Air Defense Command of the Korean People's Army Air and Anti-Air Force. The commanding officer of the command is usually a billet of Colonel general and is traditionally in charge of all ceremonial military parades on Kim Il Sung Square.

== See also ==
- Defense Security Command
- Central Theater Command
