= Heian'nan Province =

1910–1945 province of Korea under Japan

Heian'nan-dō 平安南道
- Former province of Korea, Empire of Japan
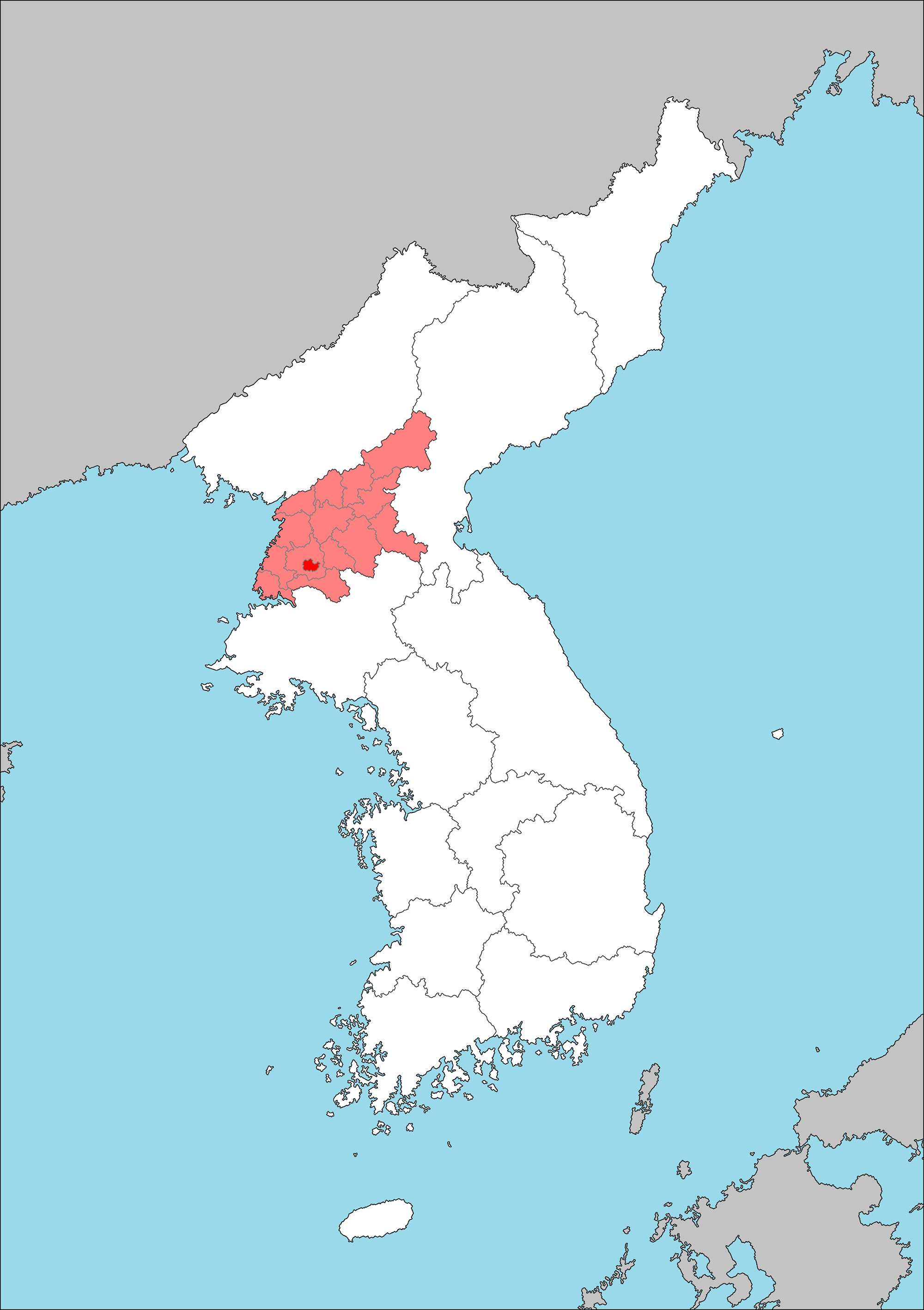
- Capital: Heijō
- History
  - Established: 29 August 1910
  - Disestablished: 15 August 1945
- Today part of: North Korea

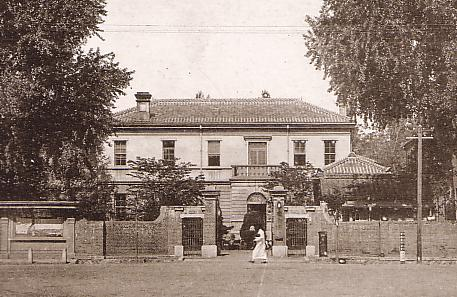
Heian-nan Provincial Office

Heian'nan-dō (平安南道; Korean: 평안남도), alternatively Heian'nan Province or South Heian Province, was a province of Korea under Japanese rule. Its capital was at Heijō. The province consisted of modern-day South Pyongan, North Korea.

== Population ==
Number of people by nationality according to the 1936 census:

- Overall population: 1,434,540 people
  - Japanese: 39,094 people
  - Koreans: 1,390,298 people
  - Other: 5,148 people

== Administrative divisions ==
=== Cities ===
Emblem of Heijō

Emblem of Chin'nanpo

- Heijō (capital)
- Chin'nanpo

=== Counties ===
- Daidō
- Junsen
- Mōzan
- Yōtoku
- Seisen
- Kōtō
- Chūwa
- Ryūkō
- Kōsei
- Heigen
- Anshū
- Kaisen
- Tokusen
- Neien

== Provincial governors ==
The following people were provincial ministers before August 1919. This was then changed to the title of governor.

| Nationality | Name | Name in kanji/hanja | Start of tenure | End of tenure | Notes |
|---|---|---|---|---|---|
| Japanese | Matsunaga Takekichi | 松永 武吉 | October 1, 1910 | March 28, 1916 | Provincial minister |
| Japanese | Kudō Eiichi | 工藤 英一 | March 28, 1916 | September 26, 1919 | Provincial minister before August 1919 |
| Japanese | Shinoda Jisaku | 篠田 治策 | September 26, 1919 | February 24, 1923 | |
| Japanese | Yoneda Jintarō | 米田 甚太郎 | February 24, 1923 | March 8, 1926 | |
| Japanese | Aoki Kaizō | 青木 戒三 | March 8, 1926 | January 21, 1929 | |
| Japanese | Sonoda Kan | 園田 寛 | January 21, 1929 | September 23, 1931 | |
| Japanese | Fujiwara Kizō | 藤原 喜蔵 | September 23, 1931 | April 1, 1935 | |
| Japanese | Yasutake Tadao | 安武 直夫 | April 1, 1935 | May 21, 1936 | |
| Japanese | Kamiuchi Hikosaku | 上内 彦策 | May 21, 1936 | August 18, 1938 | |
| Japanese | Ishida Sentarō | 石田 千太郎 | August 18, 1938 | November 19, 1941 | |
| Japanese | Taka Yasuhiko | 高 安彦 | November 19, 1941 | June 2, 1942 | |
| Japanese | Shimoiizaka Hajime | 下飯坂 元 | June 2, 1942 | September 20, 1944 | |
| Japanese | Isaka Keiichirō | 柳生 繁雄 | September 20, 1944 | May 20, 1945 | |
| Japanese | Furukawa Kanehide | 古川 兼秀 | June 16, 1945 | August 15, 1945 | Korean independence |

== See also ==
- Provinces of Korea
- Governor-General of Chōsen
- Administrative divisions of Korea
