= 1967 North Korean parliamentary election =

← 1962	28 November 1967	1972 →

All 457 seats in the Supreme People's Assembly
- Turnout: 100%
Party	Seats	+/–
Workers' Party of Korea	288	−83
Others	156	+144
This lists parties that won seats. See the complete results below.
Premier before	Premier after
Kim Il Sung; Workers' Party	Kim Il Sung; Workers' Party

Parliamentary elections were held in North Korea on 25 November 1967. Only one candidate was presented in each constituency, all of which were selected by the Workers' Party of Korea, although some ran under the banner of other parties or state organisations to give the illusion of democracy. Voter turnout was reported to be 100%, with 100% voting in favour of the candidates presented.

For the first time, the representative of Korean residents in Japan were elected as deputies. The first session (14–16 December 1967) finished with the declaration "Let Us Embody More Thoroughly Revolutionary Spirit of Independence, Self-Sustenance, and Self-Defense in All Fields of State Activity".

== Significance of the leader's seat ==
In his speech after his win in the Songrim constituency, Kim Il Sung pointed out the area's importance as a major base for the proletariat class and a place where Hwanghae Steel Mill, one of the country's major steel mills, is located.

== Results ==
Party or alliance		Votes	%	Seats
Fatherland Front	Workers' Party of Korea		100	288
Fatherland Front	Chongryon		100	7
Fatherland Front	Chondoist Chongu Party		100	4
Fatherland Front	Korean Democratic Party		100	1
Fatherland Front	Buddhist Alliance		100	1
Fatherland Front	Other parties		100	156
Total				457
Registered voters/turnout			100	
Source: Nohlen et al.
