= 1986 North Korean parliamentary election =

- 2 November 1986

All 655 seats in the Supreme People's Assembly
Party	Seats	+/–
Fatherland Front	655	+40
This lists parties that won seats. See the complete results below.
President before	President after
Kim Il Sung; Workers' Party	Kim Il Sung; Workers' Party

Parliamentary elections were held in North Korea on 2 November 1986. 655 Deputies were elected to the parliament.

The agenda of the first session of the elected eighth Supreme People's Assembly was "For the complete victory of socialism".

Under the 1972 Constitution, the number of seats in the Assembly was 655. This was increased to 687 following the 1986 election.

== Results ==
Alliance	Votes	%	Seats
Fatherland Front		100	655
Total			655
Registered voters/turnout		100	
Source: Yonhap

=== Elected members ===
The following were elected as members of parliament:

1. Electoral District (Mangyongdae): So Yun-sok
2. Electoral District (Chilgol): Kang Chun-ho
3. Electoral District (Kunggol): Yu Kyu-tong
4. Electoral District (Tangsang): Kim Yong-pok
5. Electoral District (Sonnae): Kim Pok-sil
6. Electoral District (Panpyong): Pak Tae-hun
7. Electoral District (Kwangbok): Chon Kwang-chun
8. Electoral District (Mansu): Kim Ok-sim
9. Electoral District (Chungsong): Cheo Hye-suk
10. Electoral District (Yonhwa): Kim Ung-sang
11. Electoral District (Changgwang): Yi Hyu-mong
12. Electoral District (Ongnyu): Kim Chi-hang
13. Electoral District (Chongnyu): Chi Chong-ae
14. Electoral District (Tongmun): Yi Sun-im
15. Electoral District (Munhung): Yom Tae-chun
16. Electoral District (Tapche): Kim Pyong-kon
17. Electoral District (Sagok): O Chae-won
18. Electoral District (Viam): Om Kil-son
19. Electoral District (Songyo): Yi Hwa-sun
20. Electoral District (Namsin): Kim Hoe-il
21. Electoral District (Sanop): Pak Chun-hung
22. Electoral District (Tungme): Kim In-hwa
23. Electoral District (Yulgok): Kim Kyong-suk
24. Electoral District (Ansan): Pak Nyong-hui
25. Electoral District (Ponghak): Yi Chong-yul
26. Electoral District (Yukkyo): Chon Yong-ki
27. Electoral District (Kansong): Na Chong-hui
28. Electoral District (Yonmot): Hong To-hwan
29. Electoral District (Changgyong): Yi Hwa-yong
30. Electoral District (Hasin): Paek Chang-yong
31. Electoral District (Chungsin): O Ki-su
32. Electoral District (Harimsan): Kang Tok-su
33. Electoral District (Wonbong): Yi Chun
34. Electoral District (Chijangsan): Kim Yong-cho
35. Electoral District (Hwoebul): Yi Chun-ku
36. Electoral District (Hyokson): Kim Yong-tae
37. Electoral District (Taesongsan): Chon In-tok
38. Electoral District (Sinri): Kim Chung-nin
39. Electoral District (Munsin): Yun Pyong-kwon
40. Electoral District (Saesallim): Kim Tong-nyon
41. Electoral District (Samma): Hong Si-kun
42. Electoral District (Unpasan): No Ui-hwa
43. Electoral District (Sojang): Kang Sun-hui
44. Electoral District (Potonggang): Pak Mun-chan
45. Electoral District (Kyonghung): Han Ati-su
46. Electoral District (Pulgungori): Yang Se-kon
47. Electoral District (Moran): Tae Pyong-yol
48. Electoral District (Chonsung): Nam Sun-hui
49. Electoral District (Pipa): Yi Kye-paek
50. Electoral District (Kinmaul): Choe In-tok
51. Electoral District (Kumsu): Hong Pom-kil
52. Electoral District (Yonghung): Kim Song-yul
53. Electoral District (Yongbuk): Chon Mun-sop
54. Electoral District (Anhak): O Sang-nok
55. Electoral District (Kobang): Yi Tan
56. Electoral District (Haebang): Iim Hwa-suk
57. Electoral District (Kuwolsan): Kim Yong-wan
58. Electoral District (Songsin): Choe Kil-sun
59. Electoral District (Mirim): Yi Tong-chun
60. Electoral District (Ihyon): Kim Chin-suk
61. Electoral District (Chongbaek): Ho Pok-tok
62. Electoral District (Wonam): Pak Tae-ho
63. Electoral District (Yongnam): Kim Tong-chun
64. Electoral District (Sopo): Pak Yong-sok
65. Electoral District (Sangdang): Kim Ha-kyu
66. Electoral District (Hadang): Paek Sol-hui
67. Electoral District (Singan): Yi Sin-cha
68. Electoral District (Haksan): Kim Kil-san
69. Electoral District (Yonggung): Mun Tok-hwan
70. Electoral District (Yongchu): Hwang San-ho
71. Electoral District (Oun): Ho Jong-suk
72. Electoral District (Hwasong): Yu Pyong-yun
73. Electoral District (Konji): Choe Sung-chon
74. Electoral District (Haebal): Sim Tae-kyun
75. Electoral District (Yokpo): Yi Sung-hui
76. Electoral District (Taehyon): Kang Hui-won
77. Electoral District (Sungho): Tak Hyong-che
78. Electoral District (Matan): Pyon Ung-hui
79. Electoral District (Songmun): Nam Sang-nak
80. Electoral District (Todok): Yi Chu-ung
81. Electoral District (Yokchon): Chon Mun-uk
82. Electoral District (Sokpak): Choe Tae-pok
83. Electoral District (Kangdong): Pak Song-chol
84. Electoral District (Ponghwa): Kim Po-pi
85. Electoral District (Hukyong): Choe Su-san
86. Electoral District (Songga): Kim Il-chol
87. Electoral District (Hari): Han Pong-nyo
88. Electoral District (Chunghwa): Cho Myong-nok
89. Electoral District (Myongwol): Son Song-pil
90. Electoral District (Changsan): Cho Chil-song
91. Electoral District (Majang): Kim Su-ui
92. Electoral District (Kangnam): Chi Chang-ui
93. Electoral District (Yupo): Kim Ki-ha
94. Electoral District (Changhang): Yu Chun-ok
95. Electoral District (Sangwon): Kim Ki-nam
96. Electoral District (Posonggang): Kim Sang-rin
97. Electoral District (Pyongsong): Han Chang-kun
98. Electoral District (Tumu): Pak Chong-hyon
99. Electoral District (Chungdok): Yang Hyong-sop
100. Electoral District (Chigyong): Hwang In-sop
101. Electoral District (Samwha): Cho Mi-ri
102. Electoral District (Kuwol): Choe Tong-hui
103. Electoral District (Haksu): Tak Chong-suk
104. Electoral District (Onchon): Sin Sang-kyun
105. Electoral District (Sohwa): Han Chan-ok
106. Electoral District (Porim): Kim Yong-chan
107. Electoral District (Chungsan): Yi Hyong-su
108. Electoral District (Pungjong): Pak Chong-su
109. Electoral District (Sokda): Chu Chang-chun
110. Electoral District (Taedong): Hwang Chang-yop
111. Electoral District (Yongok): Pak Tae-kap
112. Electoral District (Sijong): Han Yong-hye
113. Electoral District (Pyongwoti): Yim Chun-chu
114. Electoral District (Opa): Kim Yong-ok
115. Electoral District (Unbong): Yim Nok-chae
116. Electoral District (Hanchon): No Chong-hui
117. Electoral District (Sukchon): Kim Si-hak
118. Electoral District (Yongdok): Kim Ui-sun
119. Electoral District (Unjong): Kim Yong-mu
120. Electoral District (Kumpung): Han Sun-hui
121. Electoral District (Komhung): Pak Il-hwan
122. Electoral District (Mundok): Yi Chun-son
123. Electoral District (Ipsok): Kim Kum-ok
124. Electoral District (Yongo): Kim Tong-myong
125. Electoral District (Sangbong): Kang Song-san
126. Electoral District (Kimungum): Kim Ho-kyong
127. Electoral District (Sinanju): Kim Ki-pom
128. Electoral District (Anju): Hyon Ung-sil
129. Electoral District (Sangso): Kwak Tae-sam
130. Electoral District (Yonggye): Chang Won-sun
131. Electoral District (Namhung): Choe Han-chun
132. Electoral District (Songdo): Chu Kil-pon
133. Electoral District (Kaechon): Mun Su-ok
134. Electoral District (Namjon): Yang In-ho
135. Electoral District (Sambong): Pak Yong-sop
136. Electoral District (Pobu): Yi Myo-nyo
137. Electoral District (Hunu): Yu Sang-kol
138. Electoral District (Choyang): Yun Ung-su
139. Electoral District (Yongjin): Ho Nam-ki
140. Electoral District (Yongwon): Kim Yong-yon
141. Electoral District (Mukbang): Kim Pong-ul
142. Electoral District (Chunhyok): Chong-To-son
143. Electoral District (Sunchon): No Pok-hwa
144. Electoral District (Subok): Kim Chong-wan
145. Electoral District (Daedok): So Chae-hung
146. Electoral District (.Kumsan): Kim Chong-sil
147. Electoral District (Yonpo): Hyon Mu-kwang
148. Electoral District (Yonbong): Chon Ung-su
149. Electoral District (Changson): Han Chong-ho
150. Electoral District (Puhung): Kim Che-min
151. Electoral District (Osa): Yi Chong-kun
152. Electoral District (Chonsong): Kim Nam-kyo
153. Electoral District (Kubong): Kim Chi-hyop
154. Electoral District (Chaedong): Kim Chong-suk
155. Electoral District (Chudok): Choe Myong-kun
156. Electoral District (Songchon): Yi Chong-u
157. Electoral District (Kunja): Kim Pong-chu
158. Electoral District (Sinsongchoh): Yi Yong-pu
159. Electoral District (Changnim): Pak Son-pil
160. Electoral District (Tokam): Yang In-kil
161. Electoral District (Huichang): Won Chong-sam
162. Electoral District (Sungin): Chon Hui-chong
163. Electoral District (Taekin): Kim Yong-taek
164. Electoral District (Sinyang): An Myong-ok
165. Electoral District (Kwanghung): Kim Ung-chol
166. Electoral District (Yangdok): Yun Ki-chong
167. Electoral District (Unha): Kim Ok-nyon
168. Electoral District (Pukchang): Yi Chi-chan
169. Electoral District (Okchon): Yang Yong-kon
170. Electoral District (Sungni): Yi Won-kwan
171. Electoral District (Changmal): O Yong-pang
172. Electoral District (Kongwon): So Mong-chun
173. Electoral District (Chahgsang): Kim Choi-won
174. Electoral District (Chongsong): Kong Chin-tae
175. Electoral District (Hyongbong): Kim Hak-pong
176. Electoral District (Chenam): Kim Kwang-chin
177. Electoral District (Sungnisan): Sonu Chon-il
178. Electoral District (Maengsan): Pak Kil-yon
179. Electoral District (Yongwon): Cho Myong-son
180. Electoral District (Taehung): Choe Sang-uk
181. Electoral District (Nagwon): Yon Hyong-muk
182. Electoral District (Yonsang): Choe Tok-sin
183. Electoral District (Songhan): Kim Kyong-suk
184. Electoral District (Majon): Song Tae-yon
185. Electoral District (Chinson): Sonu Munrhung
186. Electoral District (Kwanmun): Chu Song-il
187. Electoral District (Paeksa): Kwon Hybng-suk
188. Electoral District (Minpo): Yi Kum-nyo
189. Electoral District (Miruk): So Chin-sok
190. Electoral District (Pihyon): Chong In-chun
191. Electoral District (Yangchaek): Yi Pyong-kuk
192. Electoral District (Paekma): Chong Song-nam
193. Electoral District (Yongchon): Kim Hui-sam
194. Electoral District (Yangso): Kim Chang-chu
195. Electoral District (Pukchung): Pak Myong-chun
196. Electoral District (Yongampo): Kim Kypng-su
197. Electoral District (Tasan): Yi Song-ho
198. Electoral District (Yomju): Kim Chong-hui
199. Electoral District (Oeha): Mun Song-sul
200. Electoral District (Yongaksan): Yi Man-tae
201. Electoral District (Cholsan): Kil Chun-sik
202. Electoral District (Yonsu): Ha Kuk-song
203. Electoral District (Tongnim): Chong Tae-ik
204. Electoral District (Singok): Kim Yong-sim
205. Electoral District (Kokunyong): Yo Yon-ku
206. Electoral District (Sonchon): Kim Pyong-kil
207. Electoral District (Noha): Rang Pong-kyu
208. Electoral District (Sokhwa): Yi Yong-su
209. Electoral District (Kwaksan): Chang Ki-yong
210. Electoral District (Anui): Yi Ha-sop
211. Electoral District (Chongju): Kim Ok-hyon
212. Electoral District (Wolyang): Hyon Chun-kuk
213. Electoral District (Chimhyang): Kim Song-kuk
214. Electoral District (Osan): Choe Sun-chol
215. Electoral District (Kohyon): Hong Wan-tae
216. Electoral District (Yongnam): Ki Kyong-yul
217. Electoral District (Unjon): Yang Wang-pok
218. Electoral District (Unam): Pang Ae-son
219. Electoral District (Kasan): Kim Yong-chun
220. Electoral District (Pakchon): Kang Pong-ok
221. Electoral District (Maengjung): Yim Chae-man
222. Electoral District (Songsok): Kim Pong-mo
223. Electoral District (Yonbyon): Yi Yong
224. Electoral District (Pakwon): Yi Myon-sang
225. Electoral District (Kujang): Paek Hak-nim
226. Electoral District (Yongdung): Han Kyu-chung
227. Electoral District (Yongmun): Kim Kun-su
228. Electoral District (Yongchol): Kil Ok-hyon
229. Electoral District (Suku): Sin Kyong-sik
230. Electoral District (Unsan): Jong Jun-gi
231. Electoral District (Pukchin): Yu Kye-chin
232. Electoral District (Songbong): Yim Tae-yong
233. Electoral District (Taechon): Kim Pyong-yul
234. Electoral District (Hakbong): Sok Yun-ki
235. Electoral District (Sinbong): Yi O-song
236. Electoral District (Songan): Sonu Pyong-ku
237. Electoral District (Chahung): Pak Nam-gi
238. Electoral District (Chongnyon): Kim Chae-yon
239. Electoral District (Pakesok): Chang Chang-mun
240. Electoral District (Panghyon): Ko Kum-sun
241. Electoral District (Unyang): Kim Chae-yong
242. Electoral District (Chonma): Chong Song-ok
243. Electoral District (Uiju): Hong Il-chon
244. Electoral District (Yonha): Kim Yu-pung
245. Electoral District (Tokhyon): Han Ki-chang
246. Electoral District (Sakju): Pak Song-sil
247. Electoral District (Pungnyon): Yunln-hyon
248. Electoral District (Supung): Han Chong-kon
249. Electoral District (Namsa): Choe Yun-to
250. Electoral District (Taekwan): Yi Chang-son
251. Electoral District (Yangsan): Kim Sok-hyon
252. Electoral District (Changsong): Kim Yu suk
253. Electoral District (Tongchang): Kim Mun-kap
254. Electoral District (Pyokdong): Cho Sa-yong
255. Electoral District (Sorim): Choe Hak-kun
256. Electoral District (Solmoru): Yi Tu-ik
257. Electoral District (Yokpyong): Yi Son-sil
258. Electoral District (Chupyong): Kim Song-hun
259. Electoral District (Chonsin): Cho Yong-sik
260. Electoral District (Chongpyong): An Hui-kon
261. Electoral District (Tongsin): Cho Kuk-yong
262. Electoral District (Yongmin): Kim Chae-yul
263. Electoral District (Hakmu): Kim Hui-yong
264. Electoral District (Chinchon): Chong Chun-sil
265. Electoral District (Unsong): Kim Sundae
266. Electoral District (Songgan): Choe Ung-nok
267. Electoral District (Songyong): Kim Hwan
268. Electoral District (Songha): No Chong-hwan
269. Electoral District (Songwon): Pak Song-won
270. Electoral District (Kopung): Choe Jae-u
271. Electoral District (Usi): Choe Yong-nim
272. Electoral District (Chosan): Cho Sung-ho
273. Electoral District (Wiwon): O Song-yol
274. Electoral District (Yanggang): Han Song-yong
275. Electoral District (Kosan): Kim Kyong-chang
276. Electoral District (Kangan): Yi To-won
277. Electoral District (Tunggong): Kim Un-ha
278. Electoral District (Sijung): Yi Nam-son
279. Electoral District (Sokhyon): So Yun-sok
280. Electoral District (Namchon): Pyon Yong-se
281. Electoral District (Chungsong): Yang Ok-nyo
282. Electoral District (Woeryong): Yi Won-ok
283. Electoral District (Sinmun): Ko Chun-il
284. Electoral District (Yonju): Kim Son-taek
285. Electoral District (Changgang): Hwang Chae-kyong
286. Electoral District (Changjasan): Pak Song-ok
287. Electoral District (Oil): Choe Yong-il
288. Electoral District (Nangnim): Kim Sun-yong
289. Electoral District (Hwapyong): Yi Pong-kil
290. Electoral District (Chasong): Kim Wol-son
291. Electoral District (Chunggang): Yi Chun-song
292. Electoral District (Onchon): Yu Sun-ae
293. Electoral District (Hakchon): Han Sang-kyu
294. Electoral District (Anak): Kim Yong-ok
295. Electoral District (Kyongji): O Chun-sim
296. Electoral District (Taechu): Yi In-pok
297. Electoral District (Chaeryong): O Jin-u
298. Electoral District (Samjigang): Ho Nam-sun
299. Electoral District (Changguk): Kim Won-tu
300. Electoral District (Pukchi): Yang Ki-chin
301. Electoral District (Sinchon): Han Tok-su
302. Electoral District (Saenal): Kim Ki-hwan
303. Electoral District (Yongdang): Kim Chol-myong
304. Electoral District (Hwasan): Yu Chong-hyon
305. Electoral District (Samchon): Yi Um-chon
306. Electoral District (Talchon): Pang Hak-se
307. Electoral District (Ullyul): Chong Ki-yong
308. Electoral District (Changnyon): Paek Nam-il
309. Electoral District (Ullyul Mine): Yi Cha-pang
310. Electoral District (Sindae): No Pyong-sik
311. Electoral District (Kwail): Kang Hyon-su
312. Electoral District (Songhwa): Kim Tong-won
313. Electoral District (Changyon): Sin Won-kyu
314. Electoral District (Nagyon): Yu Suk-kun
315. Electoral District (Yongyon): Chong Yon-hwa
316. Electoral District (Kumi): Yi Ho-rim
317. Electoral District (Taetan): Kim Song-hwa
318. Electoral District (Popyong): Chong Pong-hwa
319. Electoral District (Ongjin): Pak Kun-song
320. Electoral District (Namhae): Paek Pom-su
321. Electoral District (Samsan): Choe Kye-son
322. Electoral District (Manjin): Chang Tong-sun
323. Electoral District (Handong): Chong Yang-sang
324. Electoral District (Kangnyong): Choe Yol-hui
325. Electoral District (Pupo): No Muri-yol
326. Electoral District (Ssanggyo): Yi Mong-ho
327. Electoral District (Pyoksong): An Tal-su
328. Electoral District (Chukchon): Ham Won-chang
329. Electoral District (Haeju): Mun Yong-sun
330. Electoral District (Uppa): Chon Yon-sik
331. Electoral District (Okkye): Kim Yong-son
332. Electoral District (Soae): Min Ung-sik
333. Electoral District (Taegok): Yi Hong-ku
334. Electoral District (Hakhyon): Chon Chin-su
335. Electoral District (Okdong): Song Sun-chang
336. Electoral District (Sinwon): Chong Kyong-hui
337. Electoral District (Muhak): Kim Kap-sun
338. Electoral District (Pyongchon): Yu Myong-hak
339. Electoral District (Sindap): Yi Sang-ik
340. Electoral District (Chongdan): Kim Hu-pun
341. Electoral District (Sinsaeng): Kim Song-ae
342. Electoral District (Toktal): Kim Yun-hyok
343. Electoral District (Chongjong): Yi Hyon-son
344. Electoral District (Chontae): Yi Tok-chung
345. Electoral District (Ohyon): So Kwan-hui
346. Electoral District (Yonjon): Yi Sun-ae
347. Electoral District (Yonan): Kim Sang-nyon
348. Electoral District (Haewol): Yi Nak-pin
349. Electoral District (Paechon): Yi Sok-chin
350. Electoral District (Chongchon): Won Su-pok
351. Electoral District (Kumsong): Chon Pil-nyo
352. Electoral District (Kumgok): Pak Myhong-pin
353. Electoral District (Pyonghwa): Chon Kum-son
354. Electoral District (Sariwon): Pak Ha-yong
355. Electoral District (Pungni): Kang Myong-ok
356. Electoral District (Unhadong): Paek Sol
357. Electoral District (Torim): Pak Ki-so
358. Electoral District (Sangmae): Kim Chong-suk
359. Electoral District (Taesong): Yi Chang-kil
360. Electoral District (Kuchon): Yi Chong-sun
361. Electoral District (Taeunsan): Yi Man-kol
362. Electoral District (Chongbang): An Hui-chan
363. Electoral District (Songnim): Kye Ung-thae
364. Electoral District (Kotpin): Choe Hyon-ki
365. Electoral District (Chondong): Yun Ae-sun
366. Electoral District (Hwangju): So Choi
367. Electoral District (Chimchon): Cho Hye-suk
368. Electoral District (Hukkyo): Kang Song-kun
369. Electoral District (Soksan): U Tal-che
370. Electoral District (Sindok): An Yon-suk
371. Electoral District (Yontan): Choe Chong-nim
372. Electoral District (Kumbong): Han Tal-son
373. Electoral District (Pongsan): Kwak Sun-tok
374. Electoral District (Chonggye): Kang Yong-kol
375. Electoral District (Chongbang): Kim Kuk-tae
376. Electoral District (Unpa): Song Tong-sop
377. Electoral District (Kangalli): Han Chong-song
378. Electoral District (Kwangmyong): Choe Mun-son
379. Electoral District (Insan): Yi Um-chon
380. Electoral District (Taechon): Kim Ybng-un
381. Electoral District (Sohung): YI Chin-kyu
382. Electoral District (Hwagok): Mun Chang-kuk
383. Electoral District (Chajak): Choe Song-hye
384. Electoral District (Suan): Kang Sok-chu
385. Electoral District (Namjong): Yi Kwang-u
386. Electoral District (Yonsan): Kim Yu-sun
387. Electoral District (Sinpyong): Chong Chang-ik
388. Electoral District (Mannyon): Kim Yong-ho
389. Electoral District (Koksan): Han Yun-kil
390. Electoral District (Pyongam): Nam Ki-hwan
391. Electoral District (Singye): Kang Sok-sung
392. Electoral District (Chuchon): Kim Pok-mun
393. Electoral District (Chongbong): Kim Hyong-chong
394. Electoral District (Masan): Kim Chin-hwa
395. Electoral District (Pyongsan): Pak Chang-yong
396. Electoral District (Wahyon): Yi Su-chin
397. Electoral District (Chongsu): Cho Sun-paek
398. Electoral District (Chonghak): O In-hyon
399. Electoral District (Kimchon): Chang Choi
400. Electoral District (Wonmyong): Chu Sung-nam
401. Electoral District (Tosan): Yi Yong-tong
402. Electoral District (Anbong): Chu To-il
403. Electoral District (Chonnae): Ho Tarn
404. Electoral District (Hwara): Kim Sun-na
405. Electoral District (Okpyong): U Tu-tae
406. Electoral District (Munchon): No Sa-pom
407. Electoral District (Munpyong): Yun Ki-pok
408. Electoral District (Segil): Yi Hyong-sik
409. Electoral District (Wau): Yi Ki-tok
410. Electoral District (Yangji): Kim Kwang-chu
411. Electoral District (Pongchun): Nam Si-u
412. Electoral District (Chungchong): Kim U-shong
413. Electoral District (Changchon): Hong Chong-ku
414. Electoral District (Pongmak): Chong Ho-kyun
415. Electoral District (Songhung): An Tan-sil
416. Electoral District (Changjon): Chu Ui-yop
417. Electoral District (Paehwa): Yi Sun-kum
418. Electoral District (Anbyon): Kim Tu-nam
419. Electoral District (Solbong): Chong Chol-su
420. Electoral District (Kosanup): Chong Sin-hyok
421. Electoral District (Pupyong): Kim Sang-ho
422. Electoral District (Sinhyon): Han Hung-nam
423. Electoral District (Nyoja): Kim Kyong-chan
424. Electoral District (Tongchon): Yi Un-sun
425. Electoral District (Kuup): Kim Taek-su
426. Electoral District (Kosong): Jang Song-thaek
427. Electoral District (Onjong): Kwon Sun-ok
428. Electoral District (Wolbisan): Han Sang-yo
429. Electoral District (Soksa): Choe Pok-yon
430. Electoral District (Kumgang): Yu Ho-chun
431. Electoral District (Chihyesan): Kim Yang-pu
432. Electoral District (Changdo): Yi Chin-su
433. Electoral District (Hakpang): Ko Tae-pung
434. Electoral District (Kimwa): Pak Sang-yun
435. Electoral District (Hoeyang): Kim Pong-yul
436. Electoral District (Sindong): Cho Hui-won
437. Electoral District (Chollyong): An Pyong-mo
438. Electoral District (Sepo): Chang Song-u
439. Electoral District (Chungpyong): Yim Hyong-ku
440. Electoral District (Paeksan): Sin Tok-kun
441. Electoral District (Pokkye): Kim Haeng-yon
442. Electoral District (Pyonggang): Chon Chae-son
443. Electoral District (Choksan): Yi Kyae-san
444. Electoral District (Naeimm): Chong Tu-hwan
445. Electoral District (Cholwon): Sin In-ha
446. Electoral District (Anhyop): Chon Kyong-kun
447. Electoral District (Yichon): Pak In-pin
448. Electoral District (Songbuk): Hon Ki-mun
449. Electoral District (Pangyo): Yi Yong-ho
450. Electoral District (Poptong): Kwon Yi-sun
451. Electoral District (Komdok): Kim Che-dong
452. Electoral District (Kumgol): Jon Ha-chol
453. Electoral District (Yongyang): Kim Pil-han
454. Electoral District: N/A
455. Electoral District (Munam): Chong Mun-su
456. Electoral District (Tanchon): Yu Hyong-num
457. Electoral District (Hanggu): Hwang Ha-chong
458. Electoral District (Sindanchon): Yu Yong-sop
459. Electoral District (Chikchol): Kang Sung-yong
460. Electoral District (Ssangyong): Chong Chun-chong
461. Electoral District (Hqchon): Yi Chong-ho
462. Electoral District (Yongwon): Kwon Chong-hyop
463. Electoral District (Sangnong): Cho Yun-hui
464. Electoral District (Yiwon): Kim Choi-man
465. Electoral District (Chaejong): Yi Yong-kyun
466. Electoral District (Mahung): Sin Yong-tok
467. Electoral District (Pukchong): An Pyong-mu
468. Electoral District (Chonghung): Yi Chung-song
469. Electoral District (Sinbukchong): Pak Su-dong
470. Electoral District (Songnam): Cho Chong-chol
471. Electoral District (Sinchang): Choe Sun-tae
472. Electoral District (Toksong): Kim Won-kyun
473. Electoral District (Samgi): Han Man-hi
474. Electoral District (Sokhu): Yi Sung-ki
475. Electoral District (Yanghwa): Un Choi
476. Electoral District (Ohang): Yi Won-su
477. Electoral District (Sinpo): Yi Chong-kyun
478. Electoral District (Pungo): Yi Chae-hwan
479. Electoral District (Unpo): Hyon Chol-kyu
480. Electoral District (Sanyang): Hong Won-pyo
481. Electoral District (Hongwon): Choe Kwang
482. Electoral District (Sojung): Choe Chang-hak
483. Electoral District (Samho): Paek In-chun
484. Electoral District (Yoho): Kwori Sang-ho
485. Electoral District (Soho): Kim Yun-sang
486. Electoral District (Yujong): Kang Yun-kun
487. Electoral District (Chongi): Maeng Tae-ho
488. Electoral District (Hungdok): Sin Tae-hyon
489. Electoral District (Hungso): Chi Chang-se
490. Electoral District (Subyon): Cho Tae+hi
491. Electoral District (Hojon): Kim Chung-il
492. Electoral District (Sapo): Choe Chong-yong
493. Electoral District (Changhung): Pak Pong-yong
494. Electoral District (Toksan): Hong Chun-sil
495. Electoral District (Chongsong): Chong Mun-yong
496. Electoral District (Hoesang): Hong Yong-ok
497. Electoral District (Pyongsu): Chong Hui-chol
498. Electoral District (Hasinhung): Yi Chun-sim
499. Electoral District (Samil): Yu Kwi-chin
500. Electoral District (Nammun): Choe Chong-sun
501. Electoral District (Kumsa): Yi Chun-hwa
502. Electoral District (Tonghungsan): Kim Yong-yon
503. Electoral District (Sosang): Choe Yong-hae
504. Electoral District (Pyngho): Yo Chun-sok
505. Electoral District (Sound): Cha Yong-pyo
506. Electoral District (Kwangdok): Yi Pil-sang
507. Electoral District (Sangjung): Yi Ul-sol
508. Electoral District (Tongbong): Yi Yong-ae
509. Electoral District (Hamju): Yi Kyong-son
510. Electoral District (Rusang): So Kwang-hun
511. Electoral District (Changhung): Han Tong-wan
512. Electoral District (Yonggwang): Kim Yong-chun
513. Electoral District (Sujon): U Tal-ho
514. Electoral District (Tonghung): Cho Chong-kil
515. Electoral District (Yongsong): Kim Jong Il
516. Electoral District (Sinhung): Kim Tae-ok
517. Electoral District (Punghung): Ri Kun-mo
518. Electoral District (Palchon): Hong Tuk-yong
519. Electoral District (Pujon): Yang Yohg-kyok
520. Electoral District (Changjin): An Sung-hak
521. Electoral District (Sasu): Kim Song-chol
522. Electoral District (Pongdae): Kim Yong-chae
523. Electoral District (Chongpyong): Yu Pyong-ok
524. Electoral District (Yulsong): Yi Pong-won
525. Electoral District (Sinsang): Pak Kyong-hwan
526. Electoral District (Sondon): Kim Kil-yon
527. Electoral District (Kumya): Chong Mun-san
528. Electoral District (Chungnam): Yun Myong-kun
529. Electoral District (Chinhung): O Tu-ik
530. Electoral District (Innung): Yi Yon-su
531. Electoral District (Pompo): So Tong-nak
532. Electoral District (Yodok): Kim Sok-hyong
533. Electoral District (Kowon): Yi Pong-kyu
534. Electoral District (Puraesan): Kim Chu-yong
535. Electoral District (Sudong): Sin Song-u
536. Electoral District (Changdong): Cho Hum-ki
537. Electoral District (Ungok): Hong Si-hak
538. Electoral District (Kunhwa): Son Pyong-tu
539. Electoral District (Sinam): Kim Chong-on
540. Electoral District (Chongam): Choe Man-hyon
541. Electoral District (Nakyang): Han Chong-hun
542. Electoral District (Hamgang): Sin Chang-yol
543. Electoral District (Chongsong): Chi Yong-sop
544. Electoral District (Namhyang): Kim Tong-han
545. Electoral District (Malum): Hyon Yong-hui
546. Electoral District (Sunam): Pak Won-kuk
547. Electoral District (Songpyong): Yi Tong-su
548. Electoral District (Sabong): Tong Sun-mo
549. Electoral District (Kangdok): Cho Tae-ryong
550. Electoral District (Nanam): Chon Myong-sim
551. Electoral District (Punggok): Kim Tong-chol
552. Electoral District (Namchongjin): Choe Hyon-tae
553. Electoral District (Puyun): Kim Chun-kum
554. Electoral District (Haksong): Pang Chol-san
555. Electoral District (Tanso): Chon Yong-hun
556. Electoral District (Chegang): Kim Yong-nam
557. Electoral District (Sinpyongdong): Chang Tae-sik
558. Electoral District (Yonho): Choe Ung-su
559. Electoral District (Songam): An Nong-sik
560. Electoral District (Anhwa): Kim Yi-chang
561. Electoral District (Chonggyaedong): Yi Sok
562. Electoral District (Kwanhae): Kim Ku-chong
563. Electoral District (Kilchu): Kim Chl-hun
564. Electoral District (Yongbuk): Kim Wan-chin
565. Electoral District (Chunam): Choe Sang-pyok
566. Electoral District (Ilsin): So Kum-ok
567. Electoral District (Wangjaesan): Nam Tae-kuk
568. Electoral District (Hwadae): Kim Se-yong
569. Electoral District (Pullo): Chon Yong-chun
570. Electoral District (Myongchong): Kim Kuk-hun
571. Electoral District (Kocham): Kim Chang-kyu
572. Electoral District (Hwasong): YiKwi-nok
573. Electoral District (Kuktong): Nam Chong-kl
574. Electoral District (Orang): Kim Sun-sil
575. Electoral District (Odaejin): Yi Chun-pok
576. Electoral District (Kyongsong): Sin Yon-ok
577. Electoral District (Hamyon): Pak Chang-sik
578. Electoral District (Sungam): Choe Chong-kun
579. Electoral District (Puryong): Pak Choi-song
580. Electoral District (Songmak): Kim Won-pok
581. Electoral District (Yonsa): Hwang Sun-myong
582. Electoral District (Musan): Ko Hak-chin
583. Electoral District (Kangson): Chon Sung-kuk
584. Electoral District (Hoeryong): Pak Yong-sun
585. Electoral District (Soedol): Cho Se-ung
586. Electoral District (Taedok): Choe Chang-sik
587. Electoral District (Yuson): Yi Ok-sun
588. Electoral District (Mangyang): Pyon Sung-u
589. Electoral District (Onsong): Chong Hae-son
590. Electoral District (Chuwon): Yi Won-ho
591. Electoral District (Chongsong): An Munition
592. Electoral District (Saebyol): Kith Suhg-chin
593. Electoral District (Kogonwon): Han Hae-tong
594. Electoral District (Yongbukku): Kim Chae-hwan
595. Electoral District (Undok): Chon Pyong-ho
596. Electoral District (Obong): Yi Chong-pom
597. Electoral District (Haksong): Kim Pung-ki
598. Electoral District (Sonbong): Chang Chun-ho
599. Electoral District (Tumangang): Yi Kil-song
600. Electoral District (Huchang): Yi Ki-hwa
601. Electoral District (Sinpa): Kim Pun-ok
602. Electoral District (Samsu): Kim Yong-tuk
603. Electoral District (Pungsan): U Tong-che
604. Electoral District (Pungso): Kim Yong-hyok
605. Electoral District (Kapsan): Yu Chang-won
606. Electoral District (Tongjom): Ri Jong-ok
607. Electoral District (Paegam): Yim Ho-kun
608. Electoral District (Yonam): Yo Pyong-nam
609. Electoral District (Unhung): Pak Sam
610. Electoral District (Oesang): Yi Pyong-uk
611. Electoral District (Hyetan): Pak Chae-yon
612. Electoral District (Hyesan): Kim Chi-se
613. Electoral District (Hyemyong): Yi Yong-u
614. Electoral District (Wiyon): Hong Song-nam
615. Electoral District (Yonbongdong): Chang In-suk
616. Electoral District (Chundong): Yim Tok-un
617. Electoral District (Pochon): Kim Won-chon
618. Electoral District (Samjiyon): Hwang Sun-hui
619. Electoral District (Taehongdan): Pak Kun-su
620. Electoral District (Sungjon): Kim Yong-chon
621. Electoral District (Manwol): Kwori Yong-ok
622. Electoral District (Tongil): Yi In-ho
623. Electoral District (Sonjuk): Pak Chung-kuk
624. Electoral District (Kaepung): Kim Yong-sun
625. Electoral District (Yongsan): Kwon Hui-kyong
626. Electoral District (Haeson): Kim Tae-kyom
627. Electoral District (Panmuh): O Kuk-yol
628. Electoral District (Wolchong): Kim Kyong-chun
629. Electoral District (Changpung): Yi Ha-il
630. Electoral District (Chaha): Kim Ki-son
631. Electoral District (Taedoksan): Yi Kyong-suk
632. Electoral District (Hupo): Han Yun-chang
633. Electoral District (Haean): Kiin Pok-sin
634. Electoral District (Yokchondong): Kim Chong-kwan
635. Electoral District (Sangdaedu): No Pyong-taek
636. Electoral District (Konguk): Pae Un-yong
637. Electoral District (Waudo): Pyon Chang-pok
638. Electoral District (Yongjong): Chang Tae-pong
639. Electoral District (Saegil): Pak Sung-il
640. Electoral District (Taedae): Kim Yong-sam
641. Electoral District (Kiyang): Yang Myong-suk
642. Electoral District (Sohak): Yi Sung-hun
643. Electoral District (Chongsan): Kim Yohg-suk
644. Electoral District (Tokhung): Chong Tu-chan
645. Electoral District (Chamjin): Yi Chong-sun
646. Electoral District (Ponghwadong): Choe Sari-yun
647. Electoral District (Talma): Pang Yohg-tok
648. Electoral District (Wonjong): Yu Hyon-kyu
649. Electoral District (Posan): Chang In-sok
650. Electoral District (Pogu): Chong Yohg-kil
651. Electoral District (Taean): Kim Il Sung
652. Electoral District (Muhaksan): Yi Tuj-sil
653. Electoral District (Yonggang): Yom Ki-sun
654. Electoral District (Okto): Yim Ki-hwan
655. Electoral District (Hyangsan): Chong Yoh-uk
