= 1990 North Korean parliamentary election =

← 1986	22 April 1990	1998 →

All 687 seats in the Supreme People's Assembly
- Turnout: 99.78%
Party	Seats	+/–
Workers' Party of Korea	601	
Social Democratic Party	51	
Chondoist Chongu Party	22	
This lists parties that won seats. See the complete results below.
President before	President after
Kim Il Sung; Workers' Party	Kim Il Sung; Workers' Party

Parliamentary elections were held in North Korea on 22 April 1990. 687 deputies were elected to the ninth Supreme People's Assembly.

== Results ==
Of the 687 deputies, workers accounted for 37 percent, farmers 10 percent, and women 20 percent. Deputies whose ages were below 35 represented a rate of 3 percent. Those who were between 36 and 55 represented a rate of 57 percent, and those who were over 55 represented a rate of 40 percent. Among those elected were Kim Il Sung and Kim Jong Il.

Party or alliance		Votes	%	Seats
Fatherland Front	Workers' Party of Korea		100	601
Fatherland Front	Korean Social Democratic Party		100	51
Fatherland Front	Chondoist Chongu Party		100	22
Fatherland Front	Chongryon		100	13
Total				687
Registered voters/turnout			99.78	
Source: Nohlen et al., IPU

== Aftermath ==
The first session was on 24–26 May 1990. It concerned the formation of the National Defence Commission and on the agenda was "Let Us Bring the Advantages of Socialism in Our Country into Full Play."
