= 1972 North Korean parliamentary election =

← 1967	12 December 1972	1977 →

All 541 seats in the Supreme People's Assembly
- Turnout: 100%
Party	Seats	+/–
Workers' Party of Korea	127	−161
Others	414	+245
This lists parties that won seats. See the complete results below.
Premier before	Elected President
Kim Il Sung; Workers' Party	Kim Il Sung; Workers' Party

Parliamentary elections were held in North Korea on 12 December 1972. Only one candidate was presented in each constituency, all of which were selected by the Workers' Party of Korea, although some ran under the banner of other parties or state organisations to give the illusion of democracy. Voter turnout was reported to be 100%, with 100% voting in favour of the candidates presented.

In the first session, between 25 and 28 December 1972, the SPA approved a new constitution, put into force a presidential system, with Kim Il Sung elected as president. Main topics were "The Adoptation of the Socialist Construction and of the Presidential System" and "Let Us Further Strengthen the Socialist System of Our Country".

The elections were held alongside the elections to the provincial, city and county people's assemblies.

== Significance of the number 216 ==
Kim Il Sung's constituency number 216 was deliberately set to coincide with the birthday of his son Kim Jong Il, which was February 16, and is considered as a sign of handing over Kim Il Sung's power to his son.

== Results ==
Party or alliance		Votes	%	Seats
Fatherland Front	Workers' Party of Korea		100	127
Fatherland Front	Chongryon		100	7
Fatherland Front	Chondoist Chongu Party		100	4
Fatherland Front	Korean Democratic Party		100	1
Fatherland Front	Buddhist Alliance		100	1
Fatherland Front	Others		100	401
Total				541
Registered voters/turnout			100	
Source: Nohlen et al.
