= 1982 North Korean parliamentary election =

← 1977	28 February 1982	1986 →

All 615 seats in the Supreme People's Assembly
- Turnout: 100%
Party	Seats	+/–
Fatherland Front	615	+36
This lists parties that won seats. See the complete results below.
President before	President after
Kim Il Sung; Workers' Party	Kim Il Sung; Workers' Party

Parliamentary elections were held in North Korea on 28 February 1982 to elect the 615 members of the seventh Supreme People's Assembly. The first session convened on April 5, 1982. The "Decision on expediting self-reliance and peaceful reunification of the fatherland by securing the guarantee of peace" was placed as the agenda.

This was the first election where Kim Jong Il was elected to the Supreme People's Assembly.

== Results ==
Alliance	Votes	%	Seats
Fatherland Front		100	615
Total			615
Registered voters/turnout		100	
Source: Yonhap
