= 12th National Defence Commission =

North Korean military commission (2009-14)

- Sign of the Supreme People's Assembly

9 April 2009 – 9 April 2014 (5 years, 0 days) Overview
- Type: National Defence Commission
- Election: 1st Session of the 11th Supreme People's Assembly

Leadership
- Chairman: Kim Jong-un; Kim Jong-il
- First Vice Chairmen: Jo Myong-rok
- Vice Chairmen: Kim Yong-chun; Ri Yong-mu; O Kuk-ryol; Jang Song-thaek

Members
- Total: 18

The 12th National Defence Commission (NDC) of North Korea was elected by the 1st Session of the 12th Supreme People's Assembly on 9 April 2009. It was replaced on 9 April 2014 by the 13th NDC.

== Officers ==
=== Head Chairman ===
Title	Name	Birth	Death	Hangul	Took office	Left office	Duration
Chairman of the National Defence Commission	Kim Jong-il	1941	2011	김정일	9 April 2009	17 December 2011	2 years and 252 days
First Chairman of the National Defence Commission	Kim Jong-un	1984	—	김정은	13 April 2012	9 April 2014	1 year and 361 days

=== First Vice Chairman ===
Name	Birth	Death	Hangul	Took office	Left office	Duration
Jo Myong-rok	1928	2010	조명록	9 April 2009	6 November 2010	1 year and 211 days

=== Vice Chairman ===
Name	Birth	Death	Hangul	Took office	Left office	Duration
Kim Yong-chun	1936	2018	김영춘	9 April 2009	9 April 2014	5 years and 0 days
Ri Yong-mu	1925	2022	리용무	9 April 2009	9 April 2014	5 years and 0 days
O Kuk-ryol	1930	2023	오극렬	9 April 2009	9 April 2014	5 years and 0 days
Jang Song-thaek	1946	2013	장성택	7 June 2010	3 December 2013	3 years and 179 days

== Members ==
=== 1st SPA Session (2009–11) ===
Rank	Name	Birth	Death	Hangul	11th NDC	4th SES	Positions
1	Kim Jong-il	1941	2011	김정일	Old	Renewed	Chairman of the National Defence Commission
2	Jo Myong-rok	1928	2010	조명록	Old	Dead	First Vice Chairman of the National Defence Commission
3	Kim Yong-chun	1936	2018	김영춘	Old	Renewed	Vice Chairman of the National Defence Commission
4	Ri Yong-mu	1925	2022	리용무	Old	Renewed	Vice Chairman of the National Defence Commission
5	O Kuk-ryol	1930	2023	오극렬	Old	Renewed	Vice Chairman of the National Defence Commission
6	Jon Pyong-ho	1926	2014	전병호	Old	Demoted	—
7	Kim Il-chol	1933	2023	김일철	Old	Renewed	—
8	Paek Se-bong	1938	—	백세봉	New	Renewed	—
9	Jang Song-thaek	1946	2013	장성택	New	Renewed	—
10	Ju Sang-song	1933	—	주상성	New	Renewed	—
11	U Tong-chuk	1942	—	우동측	New	Renewed	—
12	Ju Kyu-chang	1928	2018	주규창	New	Renewed	—
13	Kim Jong-gak	1941	—	김정각	New	Renewed	—

=== 4th SPA Session (2011–12) ===
Rank	Name	Birth	Death	Hangul	1st SES	5th SES	Positions
1	Kim Jong-il	1941	2011	김정일	Old	Renewed	Chairman of the National Defence Commission
2	Kim Yong-chun	1936	2018	김영춘	Old	Renewed	Vice Chairman of the National Defence Commission
3	Ri Yong-mu	1925	2022	리용무	Old	Renewed	Vice Chairman of the National Defence Commission
4	Jang Song-thaek	1946	2013	장성택	Old	Renewed	Vice Chairman of the National Defence Commission
5	O Kuk-ryol	1930	2023	오극렬	Old	Renewed	Vice Chairman of the National Defence Commission
6	Kim Il-chol	1933	2023	김일철	Old	Renewed	—
7	Paek Se-bong	1938	—	백세봉	Old	Renewed	—
8	Ju Sang-song	1933	—	주상성	Old	Renewed	—
9	U Tong-chuk	1942	—	우동측	Old	Renewed	—
10	Ju Kyu-chang	1928	2018	주규창	Old	Renewed	—
11	Kim Jong-gak	1941	—	김정각	Old	Renewed	—
12	Pak To-chun	1944	—	박도춘	New	Renewed	—

=== 5th SPA Session (2012–14) ===
Rank	Name	Birth	Death	Hangul	5th SES	13th NDC	Positions
1	Kim Jong-un	1984	—	김정은	New	Reelected	First Chairman of the National Defence Commission
2	Kim Yong-chun	1936	2018	김영춘	Old	Demoted	Vice Chairman of the National Defence Commission
3	Ri Yong-mu	1925	2022	리용무	Old	Reelected	Vice Chairman of the National Defence Commission
4	Jang Song-thaek	1946	2013	장성택	Old	Expelled	Vice Chairman of the National Defence Commission
5	O Kuk-ryol	1930	2023	오극렬	Old	Reelected	Vice Chairman of the National Defence Commission
6	Pak To-chun	1944	2022	박도춘	Old	Reelected	—
7	Kim Jong-gak	1941	—	김정각	Old	Demoted	—
8	Ju Kyu-chang	1928	2018	주규창	Old	Demoted	—
9	Paek Se-bong	1938	—	백세봉	Old	Demoted	—
10	Choe Ryong-hae	1950	—	최룡해	New	Reelected	—
11	Kim Won-hong	1945	—	김원홍	New	Reelected	—
12	Ri Myong-su	1934	—	리명수	New	Demoted	—
