= Jo Myong-rok =

North Korean military officer

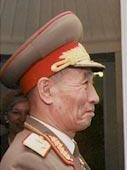
- Jo in October 2000

First Vice Chairman of the National Defence Commission
- In office 1998 – November 2010
- Chairman: Kim Jong Il
- Preceded by: O Jin-u
- Succeeded by: Position abolished

Personal details
- Born: 12 July 1928 Yonsa County, Kankyōhoku Province, Korea, Empire of Japan
- Died: 6 November 2010 (aged 82) Pyongyang, North Korea

Military service
- Allegiance: North Korea
- Branch/service: Korean People's Army
- Years of service: 1950–2010
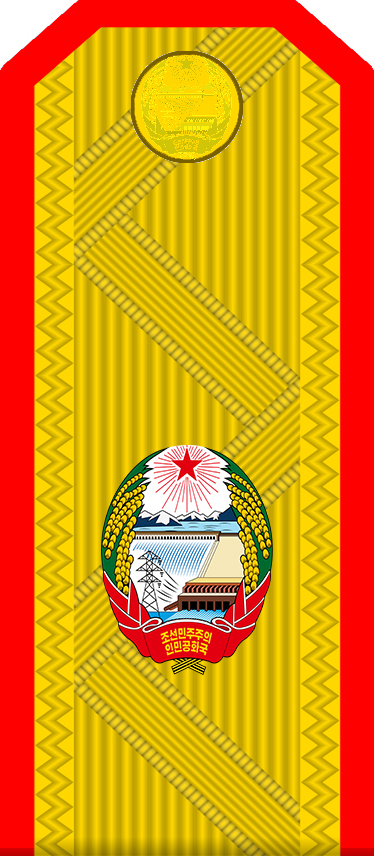
- Rank: Ch'asu (Vice Marshal)

Korean name
- Hangul: 조명록
- Hanja: 趙明祿
- RR: Jo Myeongrok
- MR: Cho Myŏngnok

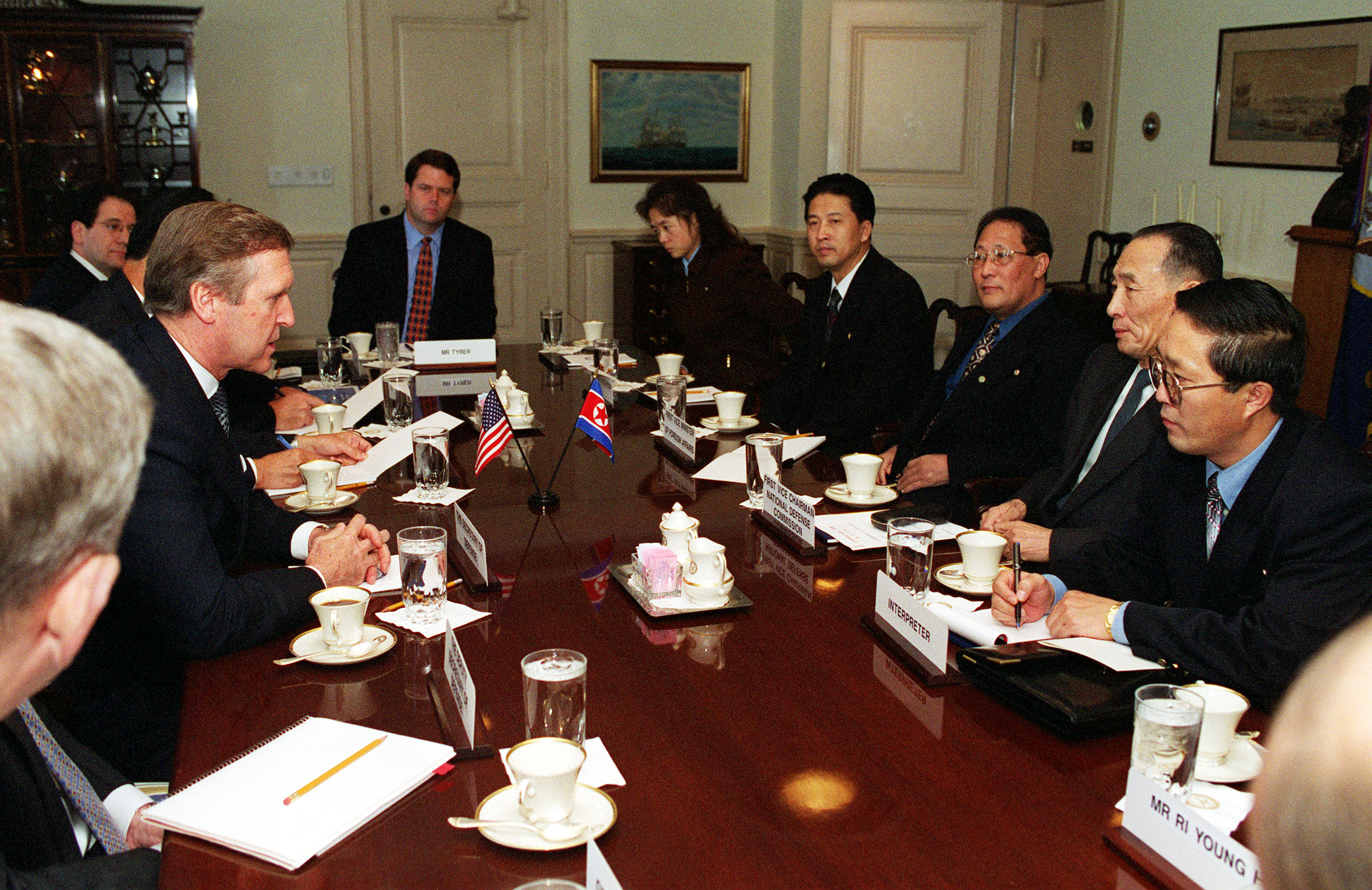
Jo Myong-rok, second right (October 2000)

Jo Myong-rok (Korean: 조명록 12 July 1928 – 6 November 2010) was a North Korean military officer who held the military rank Chasu (Vice Marshal). In 1998, he was appointed first vice-chairman of the National Defence Commission of North Korea, Director of the Korean People's Army General Political Bureau. Previously, he was the commander of the air defence forces.

== Life and career ==
Jo was born in Yonsa County, North Hamgyong Province, Korea, Empire of Japan on 12 July 1928 and he joined the Korean People's Army in December 1950. He was a graduate of the Manchuria Aviation School and Soviet Air Academy.

After serving as a pilot in the Korean War, Jo was promoted to major general in 1954 and lieutenant general in 1976. Meanwhile, he held other important posts, such as commanding officer of Pyongyang's Air Defence Command (1975–1977), and commanding officer of the Korean People's Army Air and Anti-Air Force from 1977 to 1995. At the 6th Party Congress in 1980, Jo Myong-rok was elected both member of the 6th Central Committee of the Workers' Party of Korea (he was elected an alternate member of the 5th Central Committee in 1975) and the 6th Central Military Commission. In 1992 he was promoted to general; in 1994 he was part of Kim Il Sung's funeral committee; in 1995 he was promoted to Vice Marshal and director of the KPA General Political Bureau.

He made a key speech commemorating the third anniversary of Kim Il Sung's death in special ceremonies on 8 July 1997. By 1998, when he was also appointed to the position of First Vice Chairman of the National Defence Commission, he was the second most powerful person in the country, ranking immediately beneath Kim Jong Il himself. In 2000, he visited the US on a goodwill mission. During the visit, he met with US President Bill Clinton, his counterpart William Cohen, and US Secretary of State Madeleine Albright. He was the first North Korean official to visit the White House or meet a President of the United States. The Clinton administration reciprocated by sending Albright to Pyongyang one week later to meet Kim Jong Il.

== Death ==
On 6 November 2010, Jo died of a heart attack at the age of 82, one month after he was elected as member of the Presidium of the Political Bureau. His funeral committee was chaired by Kim Jong Il and attended by more than a hundred political and military figures, including Kim Jong Un and Supreme People's Assembly President Kim Yong-nam. He lay in state in the Central Workers' Hall (home of the General Federation of Trade Unions of Korea) in Pyongyang and was buried in the Patriotic Martyrs' Cemetery.

Against expectations, his successor was not elected at the 4th Session of the 12th Supreme People's Assembly in April 2011. There was speculation that Kim Jong Il was deliberately leaving the post vacant in order to promote his son, Kim Jong Un, when he was ready.

=== Funeral committee members ===
Jo's funeral committee consisted of:

1. Kim Jong Il
2. Kim Jong Un
3. Kim Yong-nam
4. Choe Yong-rim
5. Ri Yong-ho
6. Kim Yong-chun
7. Jon Pyong-ho
8. Kim Kuk-thae
9. Kim Ki-nam
10. Choe Thae-bok
11. Yang Hyong-sop
12. Kang Sok-ju
13. Pyon Yong-rip
14. Ri Yong-mu
15. Ju Sang-song
16. Hong Sok-hyong
17. Kim Kyong-hui
18. Kim Yang-gon
19. Kim Yong-il
20. Pak To-chun
21. Choe Ryong-hae
22. Jang Song-thaek
23. Ju Kyu-chang
24. Ri Thae-nam
25. Kim Rak-hui
26. Thae Jong-su
27. Kim Phyong-hae
28. U Tong-chuk
29. Kim Jong-gak
30. Pak Jong-sun
31. Kim Chang-sop
32. Mun Kyong-dok
33. Kim Myong-guk
34. Kim Kyong-ok
35. Kim Won-hong
36. Jong Myong-do
37. Ri Pyong-chol
38. Choe Pu-il
39. Kim Yong-chol
40. Yun Jong-rin
41. Choe Sang-ryo
42. Choe Kyong-song
43. O Kuk-ryol
44. Paek Se-bong
45. Hyon Chol-hae
46. Ri Myong-su
47. Kim Chol-man
48. Ri Ul-sol
49. Ri Jong-san
50. Jon Jae-son
51. Ri Ha-il
52. Jong Chang-ryol
53. Kim Yun-sim
54. Han Tong-gun
55. Jo Kyong-chol
56. Pak Jae-gyong
57. Pyon In-son
58. Kim U-ho
59. Kim Thaek-ku
60. Choe Se-kwan
61. Jong Ho-kyun
62. Jon Chang-bok
63. O Kum-chol
64. Kim Myong-hwan
65. Kim Chol
66. Kim Su-hak
67. Kim In-sik
68. Sim Sang-dae
69. Tong Yong-il
70. Ri Pyong-sam
71. Kim Song-dok
72. Ri Chang-han
73. Ro Hung-se
74. Ri Tu-song
75. Im Jong-chun
76. Kang Phyo-yong
77. Kim Hyong-ryong
78. Kim Kyok-sik
79. Ri Yong-hwan
80. Kim Chun-sam
81. Ri Yong-gil
82. Han Chang-sun
83. Hyon Yong-chol
84. Yang Tong-hun
85. Ri Pong-juk
86. Pak Sung-won
87. Ri Chun-il
88. Ri Thae-sop
89. Kim Song-chol
90. Jo Song-hwan
91. Pak Kwang-chol
92. Yun Kyong-so
93. Yang In-guk
94. Ri Hi-su
95. Ri Chol
96. O Chol-san
97. Son Chong-nam
98. Hwang Hong-sik
99. Kang Phil-hun
100. Kim Chang-su
101. Ri Yong-min
102. Pak Yong-rae
103. Pak Yong-sik
104. Kim Su-gil
105. Rim Jong-hwan
106. Kim Kyong-chan
107. Kim Tong-hwa
108. Choe Jae-bok
109. Kim Yong-nam
110. Ri Jong-rae
111. Ju Tong-chol
112. Kim Sung-guk
113. Ju Sung-nam
114. Jong Un-hak
115. Cha Myong-song
116. Hyon Pyong-mu
117. Kim To-un
118. Ri Sung-ho
119. Pang Chun-san
120. Son Chol-ju
121. Jon Ha-chol
122. Ro Tu-chol
123. Pak Su-gil
124. Jo Pyong-ju
125. Han Kwang-bok
126. Kim Yong-dae
127. Ryu Mi-yong
128. Ri Yong-su
129. Choe Hui-jong
130. O Il-jong
131. Kim Jong-im
132. Chae Hui-jong
133. Ri Jae-il
134. Ri Ryong-ha
135. Pak Pong-ju
136. Jon Il-chun
137. Kim Tong-il
138. Han Kwang-sang
139. Jong Myong-hak
140. Kim Tong-i
141. Hong In-pom
142. Kang Yang-mo
143. Ri Man-gon
144. Ro Pae-kwon
145. Pak Thae-dok
146. Ju Yong-sik
147. O Su-yong
148. Kwak Pom-ki
149. Kim Hi-thaek
150. Rim Kyong-man
151. Paek Kye-ryong
152. Pak Ui-chun
153. Kim Hyong-sik
154. Kim Thae-bong
155. Jon Kil-su
156. Ri Mu-yong
157. An Jong-su
158. Ri Ryong-nam
159. Kim Yong-chin
160. Ryu Yong-sop
161. Pak Myong-chol
162. Jang Chol
163. Kim Ki-ryong
164. Kim Pyong-ho
165. Cha Sung-su
166. Kim Jong-suk
167. Ri Yong-chol
168. Kim Pyong-ryul
169. Jang Pyong-kyu
170. Ryang Man-gil
171. Song Cha-rip

Political offices
Vacant Title last held by O Chin-u	First Vice Chairman of the National Defence Commission; 1998–2010	Vacant Title next held by Post abolished (2012)
Preceded by Choe Kwang	Vice Chairman of the National Defence Commission; 21 February 1997 – 1998	Succeeded by Ri Yong-mu
Military offices
Preceded by	Commander of the Korean People's Air Force; 1977–1995	Succeeded by Oh Gum-chol
Preceded by O Chin-u	Director of the General Political Bureau of the Korean People's Army; 1995–2010	Vacant Title next held by Choe Ryong-hae
