= 6th Central Military Commission of the Workers' Party of Korea =

The 6th Central Military Commission (CMC) of the Workers' Party of Korea (WPK), officially the Central Military Commission of the 6th Congress of the Workers' Party of Korea, was elected by the 1st Plenary Session of the 6th Central Committee on 14 October 1980.

== Members ==
=== 6th Congress (1980–1993) ===
Rank	Name	Hangul	4th CMC	3rd CON	Membership			
Rank	Name	Hangul	4th CMC	3rd CON	6th PRE	6th POL	6th SEC	6th CEC
1	Kim Il Sung	김일성	Old	Dead	Member	Member	Member	Member
2	O Jin-u	오진우	Unknown	Dead	Member	Member	—	Member
3	Kim Jong Il	김정일	Unknown	Renewed	Member	Member	Member	Member
4	Choe Hyon	최현	Unknown	Dead	—	Member	—	Member
5	Oh Baek-ryong	오백룡	Unknown	Dead	—	Member	—	Member
6	Jon Mun-sop	全文燮	Unknown	Dead	—	Member	—	Member
7	O Kuk-ryol	오극렬	Unknown	Demoted	—	Member	—	Member
8	Paek Hak-rim	백학림	Unknown	Dead	—	Member	—	Member
9	Kim Chol-man	김철만	Unknown	Demoted	—	Alternate	—	Member
10	Kim Kang-hwan	김강환	Unknown	Demoted	—	Alternate	—	Member
11	Thae Byong-ryol	태병렬	Unknown	Dead	—	—	—	Member
12	Ri Ul-sol	리을설	Unknown	Demoted	—	—	—	Member
13	Chu Do-il	추도일	Unknown	Demoted	—	—	—	Member
14	Ri Tu-ik	이두익	Unknown	Demoted	—	—	—	Member
15	Jo Myong-rok	조명록	Unknown	Demoted	—	—	—	Member
16	Kim Il-chol	김일철	Unknown	Demoted	—	—	—	Member
17	Choe Sang-uk	최상욱	Unknown	Demoted	—	—	—	Member
18	Yi Pong-won	이본원	Unknown	Demoted	—	—	—	Member
19	Oh Ryong-bang	오룡방	Unknown	Dead	—	—	—	Alternate

=== 3rd Conference (2010–2012) ===
Rank	Name	Hangul	6th CON	4th CON	Membership			
Rank	Name	Hangul	6th CON	4th CON	6th PRE	6th POL	6th SEC	6th CEC
1	Kim Jong Il	김정일	Old	Dead	Member	Member	Member	Member
2	Kim Jong Un	김정은	New	Renewed	—	—	—	Member
3	Ri Yong-ho	리영호	New	Renewed	Member	Member	—	Member
4	Kim Yong-chun	김영춘	New	Renewed	—	Member	—	Member
5	Kim Jong-gak	김정각	New	Renewed	—	Alternate	—	Member
6	Kim Myong-guk	김명국	New	Renewed	—	—	—	Member
7	Kim Kyong-ok	김경옥	New	Renewed	—	—	—	Member
8	Kim Won-hong	김원홍	New	Renewed	—	—	—	Member
9	Jong Myong-do	정명도	New	Renewed	—	—	—	Member
10	Ri Pyong-chol	리병철	New	Renewed	—	—	—	Member
11	Choe Pu-il	최부일	New	Renewed	—	—	—	Member
12	Kim Yong-chol	김영철	New	Renewed	—	—	—	Member
13	Yun Jong-rin	윤정린	New	Renewed	—	—	—	Member
14	Ju Kyu-chang	주규창	New	Renewed	—	Alternate	—	Member
15	Choe Sang-ryo	최상려	New	Renewed	—	—	—	Member
16	Choe Kyong-song	최경성	New	Renewed	—	—	—	Member
17	U Tong-chuk	우동측	New	Renewed	—	Alternate	—	Member
18	Choe Ryong-hae	최룡해	New	Renewed	—	—	Member	Member
18	Jang Song-thaek	장성택	New	Renewed	—	Alternate	—	Member

=== 4th Conference (2012–2016) ===
Rank	Name	Hangul	3rd CON	7th CMC	Membership		
Rank	Name	Hangul	3rd CON	7th CMC	6th PRE	6th POL	6th SEC
1	Kim Jong Un	김정은	Old	Reelected	Member	Member	Member
2	Choe Ryong-hae	최룡해	Old	Reelected	Member	Member	Member
3	Ri Yong-ho	리영호	Old	Dead	Member	Member	—
4	Kim Yong-chun	김영춘	Old	Demoted	—	Member	—
5	Kim Jong-gak	김정각	Old	Demoted	—	Member	—
6	Hyon Chol-hae	현철해	New	Demoted	—	Member	—
7	Kim Kyong-ok	김경옥	Old	Reelected	—	—	—
8	Kim Won-hong	김원홍	Old	Reelected	—	Member	—
9	Jong Myong-do	정명도	Old	Demoted	—	—	—
10	Ri Pyong-chol	리병철	Old	Demoted	—	—	—
11	Choe Pu-il	최부일	Old	Reelected	—	Alternates	—
12	Ri Myong-su	리명수	New	Reelected	—	—	—
13	U Tong-chuk	우동측	Old	Demoted	—	—	—
14	Yun Jong-rin	윤정린	Old	Demoted	—	—	—
15	Jang Song-thaek	장성택	Old	Expelled	—	Member	—
16	Kim Yong-chol	김영철	Old	Reelected	—	—	—
17	Choe Sang-ryo	최상려	Old	Demoted	—	—	—
18	Choe Kyong-song	최경성	Old	Demoted	—	—	—
19	Kim Myong-guk	김명국	Old	Demoted	—	—	—
20	Ju Kyu-chang	주규창	Old	Demoted	—	Alternates	—
21	Kim Rak-gyom	김락겸	New	Demoted	—	—	—
