= 10th National Defence Commission =

- Sign of the Supreme People's Assembly

5 September 1998 – 3 September 2003 (4 years, 363 days) Overview
- Type: National Defence Commission
- Election: 1st Session of the 10th Supreme People's Assembly

Leadership
- Chairman: Kim Jong-il
- First Vice Chairmen: Jo Myong-rok
- Vice Chairmen: Kim Il-chol; Ri Yong-mu

The 10th National Defence Commission (NDC) of North Korea was elected by the 1st Session of the 10th Supreme People's Assembly on 5 September 1998. It was replaced on 3 September 2003 by the 11th NDC.

== Members ==
Rank	Name	Birth	Death	Hangul	9th NDC	11th NDC	Positions
1	Kim Jong-il	1941	2011	김정일	Old	Reelected	Chairman of the National Defence Commission
2	Jo Myong-rok	1928	2010	조명록	New	Reelected	First Vice Chairman of the National Defence Commission
3	Kim Il-chol	1933	2023	김일철	Old	Reelected	Vice Chairman of the National Defence Commission
4	Ri Yong-mu	1925	2022	리용무	New	Reelected	Vice Chairman of the National Defence Commission
5	Kim Yong-chun	1936	2018	김영춘	Old	Reelected	—
6	Yon Hyong-muk	1931	2005	연형묵	New	Reelected	—
7	Ri Ul-sol	1921	2015	리을설	Old	Demoted	—
8	Paek Hak-rim	1918	2006	백학림	New	Demoted	—
9	Jon Pyong-ho	1926	2014	전병호	New	Reelected	—
10	Kim Chol-man	1920	2018	김철만	New	Demoted	—
