= 11th National Defence Commission =

- Sign of the Supreme People's Assembly

3 September 2003 – 9 April 2009 (5 years, 218 days) Overview
- Type: National Defence Commission
- Election: 1st Session of the 11th Supreme People's Assembly

Leadership
- Chairman: Kim Jong-il
- First Vice Chairmen: Jo Myong-rok
- Vice Chairmen: Kim Il-chol; Ri Yong-mu

The 11th National Defence Commission (NDC) of North Korea was elected by the 1st Session of the 11th Supreme People's Assembly on 3 September 2003. It was replaced on 9 April 2009 by the 12th NDC.

== Members ==
Rank	Name	Birth	Death	Hangul	10th NDC	12th NDC	Positions
1	Kim Jong-il	1941	2011	김정일	Old	Reelected	Chairman of the National Defence Commission
2	Jo Myong-rok	1928	2010	조명록	Old	Reelected	First Vice Chairman of the National Defence Commission
3	Yon Hyong-muk	1931	2005	연형묵	Old	Dead	Vice Chairman of the National Defence Commission
4	Ri Yong-mu	1925	2022	리용무	Old	Reelected	Vice Chairman of the National Defence Commission
5	Kim Yong-chun	1936	2018	김영춘	Old	Reelected	—
6	Kim Il-chol	1933	2023	김일철	Old	Reelected	—
7	Jon Pyong-ho	1926	2014	전병호	Old	Reelected	—
8	Choe Ryong-su	1950	—	최룡수	New	Demoted	—
9	Paek Se-bong	1938	—	백세봉	New	Reelected	—
