= 13th National Defence Commission =

- Sign of the Supreme People's Assembly

9 April 2014 – 29 June 2016 (2 years, 81 days) Overview
- Type: National Defence Commission
- Election: 1st Session of the 13th Supreme People's Assembly

Leadership
- Chairman: Kim Jong-un
- Vice Chairmen: Choe Ryong-hae; Ri Yong-mu; O Kuk-ryol; Hwang Pyong-so

Members
- Total: 18

The 13th National Defence Commission (NDC) of North Korea was elected by the 1st Session of the 13th Supreme People's Assembly, the country's rubber-stamp unicameral legislative body, on 9 April 2014. It was replaced on 29 June 2016 by the 13th State Affairs Commission.

== Officers ==
=== First Chairman ===
| Name | Birth | Hangul | Took office | Left office | Duration |
|---|---|---|---|---|---|
| Kim Jong-un | 1984 | 김정은 | 9 April 2014 | 29 June 2016 | 1 year and 361 days |

=== Vice Chairman ===
| Name | Birth | Hangul | Took office | Left office | Duration |
|---|---|---|---|---|---|
| Choe Ryong-hae | 1950 | 최룡해 | 9 April 2014 | 25 September 2014 | 169 days |
| Ri Yong-mu | 1925 | 리용무 | 9 April 2014 | 29 June 2016 | 2 years and 81 days |
| O Kuk-ryol | 1930 | 오극렬 | 9 April 2014 | 29 June 2016 | 2 years and 81 days |
| Hwang Pyong-so | 1949 | 황병서 | 25 September 2014 | 29 June 2016 | 1 year and 278 days |

== Members ==
| Rank | Name | Birth | Hangul | 12th NDC | 13th SAC | Positions |
|---|---|---|---|---|---|---|
| 1 | Kim Jong-un | 1984 | 김정은 | Old | Elected | First Chairman of the National Defence Commission |
| 2 | Choe Ryong-hae | 1950 | 최룡해 | Old | Elected | Vice Chairman of the National Defence Commission |
| 3 | Ri Yong-mu | 1925 | 리용무 | Old | Demoted | Vice Chairman of the National Defence Commission |
| 4 | O Kuk-ryol | 1930 | 오극렬 | Old | Demoted | Vice Chairman of the National Defence Commission |
| 5 | Jang Jong-nam | 1960 | 장정남 | New | Recalled | — |
| 6 | Pak To-chun | 1944 | 박도춘 | Old | Recalled | — |
| 7 | Kim Won-hong | 1945 | 김원홍 | Old | Elected | — |
| 8 | Choe Pu-il | 1944 | 최부일 | New | Elected | — |
| 9 | Jo Chun-ryong | — | 조춘룡 | New | Demoted | — |

=== Changes (2014–16) ===
| Name | Birth | Hangul | Changes | | 13th SAC |
| Name | Birth | Hangul | 2 SES (2014) | 3 SES (2015) | 13th SAC |
|---|---|---|---|---|---|
| Hyon Yong-chol | 1949 | 현영철 | Elected | — | Expelled |
| Hwang Pyong-so | 1949 | 황병서 | Elected | — | Elected |
| Jang Jong-nam | 1960 | 장정남 | Recalled | — | No |
| Kim Chun-sop | — | 김춘섭 | — | Elected | No |
| Pak To-chun | 1944 | 박도춘 | — | Recalled | Demoted |
| Ri Pyong-chol | 1948 | 리병철 | Elected | — | Demoted |
