= 11th Supreme People's Assembly =

←	10th	12th	→

Overview
- Legislative body: Supreme People's Assembly
- Term: 3 August 2003 – 8 March 2009
- Election: 3 August 2003

Supreme People's Assembly
- Members: 687
- President of the Presidium: Kim Yong-nam
- Chairman: Choe Thae-bok

The 11th Supreme People's Assembly (Chosongul: 최고인민회의 제11기) of North Korea was in session from 2003 until 2009. It consisted of 687 deputies, and held six sessions.

The Supreme People's Assembly is the unicameral legislature of the Democratic People's Republic of Korea (DPRK), commonly known as North Korea. It consists of one deputy from each of the DPRK's 687 constituencies, elected to five-year terms. The constitution recognizes the Workers' Party as the leading party of the state. The Workers' Party, led by Kim Jong-un, governs the DPRK in a monopoly coalition with the Social Democratic Party and the Chondoist Chongu Party called the Democratic Front for the Reunification of the Fatherland. Elections are held in five-year intervals, the most recent taking place in 2019. Although the Supreme People's Assembly is the primary legislative body of the DPRK, it ordinarily delegates authority to the smaller and more powerful Presidium, chosen from among its members.

== Leadership ==
- President of the Presidium of the Supreme People's Assembly

Kim Yong-nam

- Vice Presidents of the Presidium of the Supreme People's Assembly

Yang Hyong-sop
Kim Yong-dae

- Honorable Vice Presidents of the Presidium of the Supreme People's Assembly

Pak Song-chol
Kim Yong-ju

- Secretary General of the Presidium of the Supreme People's Assembly

Kim Yun-hyok

- Members of the Presidium of the Supreme People's Assembly

Ryu Mi-yong
Kang Yong-sop
Pak Tae-hwa
Hong Sok-hyong
Ri Kwang-ho
Ryom Sun-gil
Sung Sang-sop
Pak Sun-hui
Pyon Yong-rip
Thae Yong-chol

- Chairman of the Supreme People's Assembly

Choe Thae-bok

- Vice Chairmen of the Supreme People's Assembly

Kang Nung-so
Ryo Won-gu

== Sessions ==
=== 1st session ===
Date: 3 September 2003

Highlights:

- The SPA chairman and vice-chairmen were elected.
- The Credentials Committee was elected with Jon Pyong-ho as its chairman.
- Kim Jong-il was re-elected as Chairman of the National Defense Commission.
- The SPA Presidium was elected.
- The National Defence Commission was elected.
  - First Vice Chairman: Jo Myong-rok
  - Vice Chairmen: Yon Hyong-muk, Ri Yong-mu
  - Members: Kim Yong-chun, Kim Il-chol, Jon Pyong-ho, Choe Ryong-su, Paek Se-bong
- The Premier and the Cabinet were elected.
  - Premier: Pak Pong-ju
  - Vice Premiers: Kwak Pom-gi, Ro Tu-chol, Jon Sung-hun
  - Minister of Foreign Affairs: Paek Nam-sun
  - Minister of Public Security: Choe Ryong-su
  - Chairman of the State Planning Commission: Kim Kwang-rin
  - Minister of Power and Coal Industries: Ju Tong-il
  - Minister of Extractive Industries: Ri Kwang-nam
  - Minister of Metal and Machine Building Industries: Kim Sung-hyon
  - Minister of Electronics Industry: O Su-yong
  - Minister of Construction and Building Materials Industries: Jo Yun-hui
  - Minister of Railways: Kim Yong-sam
  - Minister of Land and Marine Transport: Kim Yong-il
  - Minister of Agriculture: Ri Kyong-sik
  - Minister of Chemical Industry: Ri Mu-yong
  - Minister of Light Industry: Ri Ju-o
  - Minister of Foreign Trade: Ri Kwang-gun
  - Minister of Forestry: Ri Sang-mu
  - Minister of Fisheries: Ri Song-ung
  - Minister of City Management: Choe Jong-gon
  - Minister of Land and Environment Preservation: Jang Il-son
  - Minister of State Construction Control: Pae Tal-jun
  - Minister of Commerce: Ri Yong-son
  - Minister of Procurement and Food Administration: Choe Nam-gyun
  - Minister of Education: Kim Yong-jin
  - Minister of Posts and Telecommunications: Ri Kum-bom
  - Minister of Culture: Choe Ik-gyu
  - Minister of Finance: Mun Il-bong
  - Minister of Labor: Ri Won-il
  - Minister of Public Health: Kim Su-hak
  - Minister of Physical Culture and Sports: Pak Myong-chol
  - Minister of State Inspection: Kim Ui-sun
  - President of the Academy of Sciences: Pyon Yong-rip
  - Chairman of the Physical Culture and Sports Guidance Commission: Pak Myong-chol
  - President of the Central Bank: Kim Wan-su
  - Director of the Central Statistic Bureau: Kim Chang-su
  - Chief Secretary: Jong Mun-san
- The SPA committees were elected.
  - Legislation Committee
    - Chairman: Choe Ryong-su
  - Budget Committee
    - Chairman: Han Song-ryong
- The Public Prosecutor-General of the Central Public Prosecutors' Office and the President of the Central Court were elected.
  - Public Prosecutor-General of the Supreme Prosecutors' Office: Ri Kil-song
  - Chief Justice of the Supreme Court: Kim Pyong-ryul
- The measures of the Ministry of Foreign Affairs in relation to the DPRK-US nuclear issue were approved.
- Jon Pyong-ho made a report on the credentials of the SPA deputies.
- Jon Pyong-ho's report on the credentials of the SPA deputies was approved.

=== 2nd session ===
Date: 25 March 2004

Highlights:

- Premier Pak Pong-ju made a report on the work of the Cabinet in 2003 and its tasks in 2004.
- Finance minister Mun Il-bong made a report on the implementation of the 2003 state budget and on the 2004 state budget.
- Pak Pong-ju's report on the work of the Cabinet and Mun Il-bong's report on the implementation of the 2003 state budget were approved.
- The 2004 state budget was adopted.

=== 3rd session ===
Date: 11 April 2005

Highlights:

- Premier Pak Pong-ju made a report on the work of the Cabinet in 2004 and its tasks in 2005.
- Finance minister Mun Il-bong made a report on the implementation of the 2004 state budget and on the 2005 state budget.
- Pak Pong-ju's report on the work of the Cabinet and Mun Il-bong's report on the implementation of the 2004 state budget were approved.
- The 2005 state budget was adopted.
- Choe Yong-rim was elected as secretary general of the SPA presidium.
- Kang Chang-uk was elected as a member of the SPA presidium.

=== 4th session ===
Date: 11 April 2006

Highlights:

- Premier Pak Pong-ju made a report on the work of the Cabinet in 2005 and its tasks in 2006.
- Vice premier Ro Tu-chol made a report on the implementation of the 2005 state budget and on the 2006 state budget.
- Pak Pong-ju's report on the work of the Cabinet and Ro Tu-chol's report on the implementation of the 2005 state budget were approved.
- The 2006 state budget was adopted.
- SPA chairman Choe Thae-bok made a report on improving the development of science and technology.
- A decision on improving the development of science and technology was adopted.

=== 5th session ===
Date: 11 April 2007

Highlights:

- Vice premier Kwak Pom-gi made a report on the work of the Cabinet in 2006 and its tasks in 2007.
- Vice premier Ro Tu-chol made a report on the implementation of the 2006 state budget and on the 2007 state budget.
- The 2007 state budget was adopted.
- Kim Yong-il was elected as Premier replacing Pak Pong-ju.
- Kim Yong-chun was elected as NDC vice chairman.

=== 6th session ===
Date: 9 April 2008

Highlights:

- Premier Kim Yong-il made a report on the work of the Cabinet in 2007 and its tasks in 2008.
- Vice premier Ro Tu-chol made a report on the implementation of the 2007 state budget and on the 2008 state budget.
- The 2008 state budget was adopted.
- SPA vice chairman Kang Nung-so was recalled.
