= Kim Chol-man =

North Korean general

Colonel General Kim Chol-man
- Born: 2 November 1920; Heianhoku Province, Korea, Empire of Japan
- Died: 3 December 2018 (aged 98); Pyongyang, North Korea
- Military career
- Allegiance: North Korea
- Branch: Korean People's Army
- Service years: 1937–2018
- Rank: Colonel General
- Conflicts: Korean War
- Awards: Hero of the Republic; Double Hero

Korean name
- Hangul: 김철만
- Hanja: 金鐵萬
- RR: Gim Cheolman
- MR: Kim Ch'ŏlman

Kim Chol-man (Korean: 김철만; 2 November 1920 – 3 December 2018) was a North Korean politician and military official. He was a member of several important committees and organizations, including the 6th Central Military Commission, the 6th Politburo, and the Second Economic Committee. He was at the forefront of the North Korean munitions industry, the country's economic base (see Songun). In old age Kim was no longer considered a major player in North Korean politics, having retired from most of his important posts.

== Early life and education ==
Kim was born in 1918 in South Pyongan Province. He is the brother-in-law of Han Tok-su, former chairman of the General Association of Korean Residents in Japan.

He was trained at the Frunze Military Academy in the Soviet Union, then known as the RKKA Military Academy.

== Military career ==
Kim joined Kim Il Sung's United Army in 1937 along with other first-generation guerrilla leaders such as Ri Ul-sol and Kim Ik-hyon.

Military career
Position/rank	Date promoted	Unit
Colonel (sangjwa)	1945	Korean People's Army
Commanding Officer	September 1948	25th Regiment, 12th Division, Korean People's Army
Major General (sojang)	1953	Korean People's Army
Commanding Officer	April 1955	37th Division, Korean People's Army
Lieutenant General (chungjang)	July 1962	Korean People's Army
Commanding Officer	January 1965	2nd Army Corps, Korean People's Army
Deputy Chief of Staff	February 1968	Korean People's Army
Colonel General (sangjang)	February 1968	Korean People's Army
Senior Deputy Chief of Staff	July 1970	Korean People's Army
Director-General (daejang)	September 1988	Bureau of Supply and Maintenance, Korean People's Army

Kim saw action in the Korean War and suffered physical wounds.

Kim also held many para-military posts. In 1964, he became the Director-General of the Strategy Bureau in the Ministry of People's Security. During this time, he was a central figure in the establishment of a unitary leadership and a collective principle system in North Korea, along with Kim Jong Il. In October 1980 he was appointed a member of the powerful 6th Central Military Commission of the Workers' Party of Korea. In September 1998 he became a member of the National Defense Commission. Kim led North Korea's munitions industry, the country's economic base, along with Korean Workers' Party Secretary Jon Pyong-ho.

== Political career ==
In November 1967, as a member of the first generation of North Korean leadership, Kim was elected as an alternate member to the 6th Central Committee of the Korean Workers' Party. He was elevated to full member status in November 1970. Kim's position was placed in danger following a 1969 purge of military officials, but survived untouched. For a short period of time (October 1980 – September 1981) Kim was an alternate member of the Politburo of the Workers' Party of Korea, the highest decision-making body of North Korea.

Special positions he held include the Chair of the Second Economic Committee, and the funeral committees of both Kim Il Sung and O Jin-u. The funeral committees are often seen as an indicator of de facto power.

In old age, Kim was retired from many of his positions. During a reshuffle in 2003, which saw the removal of other members of the first generation of North Korean leadership such as Ri Ul-sol, Kim was retired from the Second Economic Committee and the National Defense Commission. He held on to membership in the Central Military Committee until September 2010.

He was a delegate deputy to the 5th, 6th, 8th, 9th, 10th, 11th, and 12th Supreme People's Assemblies.

== Awards ==
Kim was the recipient of the Hero of the Republic and Double Hero awards in 1968 and 1992 respectively.

== Death ==
Kim Chol-man died of bladder cancer on 3 December 2018 at the age of 98. His funeral committee was chaired by Kim Jong Un and was composed of the following members:

1. Kim Jong Un
2. Choe Ryong-hae
3. Pak Pong-ju
4. Yang Hyong-sop
5. Ri Myong-su
6. Ri Su-yong
7. Kim Phyong-hae
8. Thae Jong-su
9. O Su-yong
10. An Jong-su
11. Kim Yong-chol
12. Choe Pu-il
13. Ro Tu-chol
14. Choe Hwi
15. Pak Thae-dok
16. Kim Su-gil
17. Ri Yong-gil
18. No Kwang-chol
19. Jong Kyong-thaek
20. Im Chol-ung
21. Jo Yon-jun
22. Ri Man-gon
23. Ri Pyong-chol
24. Kim Nung-o
25. Kim Tok-hun
26. Ri Ju-o
27. Ri Ryong-nam
28. Tong Jong-ho
29. Jon Kwang-ho
30. Ko In-ho
31. Kim Yong-dae
32. Hwang Sun-hui
33. Pak Kyong-suk
34. Ri Yong-suk
35. Ri Il-hwan
36. Ri Chol-man
37. Choe Tong-myong
38. Ri Yong-rae
39. Ryang Won-ho
40. Pak To-chun
41. Hong Sung-mu
42. Hong Yong-chil
43. Yu Jin
44. Kang Pong-hun
45. Kim Tu-il
46. Mun Kyong-dok
47. Pak Yong-ho
48. Ryang Jong-hun
49. Kim Jae-ryong
50. Pak Jong-nam
51. Ri Hi-yong
52. Kim Song-il
53. Ri Sang-won
54. Kang Yang-mo
55. Sin Yong-chol
56. Jong Yong-guk
57. Pak Chol-min
58. Ju Yong-gil
59. Kim Chang-yop
60. Jang Chun-sil
61. Jo Jun-mo
62. So Hong-chan
63. Son Chol-ju
64. Jo Kyong-chol
65. Ri Tu-song
66. Yun Tong-hyon
67. Kim Song-chol
68. Ho Yong-chun
69. Kim Hyong-ryong
70. Ri Yong-ju
71. O Kum-chol
