= 9th National Defence Commission =

- Sign of the Supreme People's Assembly

26 May 1990 – 5 September 1998 (8 years, 102 days) Overview
- Type: Meeting of the National Defence Commission
- Election: 1st Session of the 9th Central People's Committee

Leadership
- Chairman: Kim Il Sung
- First Vice Chairmen: Kim Jong Il
- Vice Chairmen: Choe Kwang; O Jin-u

The 9th National Defence Commission (NDC) of North Korea was appointed by the 9th Central People's Committee in its 1st Session. It was replaced on 6 September 1998 by the 11th NDC.

== Members ==
Rank	Name	Birth	Death	Hangul	9th NDC	11th NDC	Positions
1	Kim Il Sung	1912	1994	김일성	Old	Dead	Chairman of the National Defence Commission
2	Kim Jong Il	1941	2011	김정일	Not made public	Reelected	First Vice Chairman of the National Defence Commission
3	O Jin-u	1917	1995	리용무	Old	Dead	Vice Chairman of the National Defence Commission
4	Choe Kwang	1918	1997	최광	Not made public	Dead	Vice Chairman of the National Defence Commission
—	Ju To-il	1922	1994	추도일	Not made public	Not	—
—	Jon Pyong-ho	1926	2014	전병호	Not made public	Reelected	—
—	Kim Chol-man	1920	2018	김철만	Not made public	Reelected	—
—	Kim Kwang-jin	1927	1997	김광진	Not made public	Not	—
—	Kim Pong-ryul	1918	1995	김퐁열	Not made public	Not	—
—	Ri Ul-sol	1921	2015	리을설	Not made public	Reelected	—
—	Yi Ha-il			이하일	Not made public	Not	—
