= Jon Pyong-ho =

North Korean general (1926–2014)

Personal details
- Born: 20 March 1926 Musan County, North Hamgyong Province, North Korea
- Died: 7 July 2014 (aged 88)
- Citizenship: North Korean
- Party: Workers' Party of Korea

Military service
- Allegiance: North Korea
- Branch/service: Korean People's Army
- Rank: Daejang (General)

Korean name
- Hangul: 전병호
- Hanja: 全炳浩
- RR: Jeon Byeongho
- MR: Chŏn Pyŏngho

Jon Pyong-ho (Korean: 전병호, 20 March 1926 – 7 July 2014) was a North Korean officer and politician who served as the Chief Secretary of the Korean Workers Party (KWP) Committee of the North Korean Cabinet, and director of the DPRK Cabinet Political Bureau before his retirement in 2010. Jon was described as the 'Chief architect of North Korea's nuclear programme'. Jon was a general of the Korean People's Army and a close adviser to the late Kim Jong Il.

Jon played a key role in the production and development of North Korean defense industry for more than four decades before retiring in 2011. Jon supervised the development of the country's long-range ballistic missile programmes and was involved with its first test of a nuclear device in 2006 directly. Jon was reported to help broker a deal with Pakistan during the 1990s that gave North Korea critical technology for its uranium enrichment programme in exchange for North Korea's missile technology. Jon was sanctioned by the United Nations as a result of his involvement in the country's nuclear and missile weapons programmes.

He was born in Musan County, in North Hamgyong Province, and was educated at the Ural Engineering College in the Soviet Union, where he graduated in 1950. He has since held a number of positions within the North Korean military and government, and was appointed member of the National Defense Commission in February 2009. In December 2011, he was named as one of the members of the funeral committee for the late supreme leader Kim Jong Il. He has been described as "a talented writer with an excellent knowledge of policy and process."

== Death and funeral ==
On 7 July 2014 Jon Pyong-ho died of acute myocardial infarction at the age of 88. He was awarded a state funeral, attended by Kim Jong Un.

The funeral commission of Jon Pyong-ho, chaired by Kim Jong Un, was composed of the following individuals:

1. Kim Jong Un
2. Kim Yong-nam
3. Pak Pong-ju
4. Hwang Pyong-so
5. Ri Yong-gil
6. Hyon Yong-chol
7. Kim Ki-nam
8. Choe Tae-bok
9. Choe Ryong-hae
10. Pak To-chun
11. Yang Hyong-sop
12. Kang Sok-ju
13. Ri Yong-mu
14. O Kuk-ryol
15. Kim Won-hong
16. Kim Yang-gon
17. Kim Phyong-hae
18. Kwak Pom-gi
19. O Su-yong
20. Choe Pu-il
21. Ro Tu-chol
22. Jo Yon-jun
23. Ri Il-hwan
24. Kim Man-song
25. Han Kwang-bok
26. O Il-jong
27. An Jong-su
28. Kim Jong-im
29. Kim Jung-hyop
30. Han Kwang-sang
31. Hong In-bom
32. Kim Kyong-ok
33. Ri Jae-il
34. Choe Hwi
35. Jon Il-chun
36. Jong Myong-hak
37. Kim Hi-taek
38. Kang Kwan-il
39. Hong Yong-chil
40. Hong Sung-mu
41. Jang Chang-ha
42. Rim Chun-song
43. Pyon In-son
44. So Hong-chan
45. Pak Yong-sik
46. Ryom Chol-song
47. Jo Kyong-chol
48. Yun Tong-hyon
49. Kang Phyo-yong
50. Kim Hyong-ryong
51. Kim Hyong-sik
52. Ri Pyong-chol
53. Kim Chun-sam
54. Kim Yong-chol
55. O Kum-chol
56. Pak Jong-chon
57. Kim Jong-gwan
58. No Kwang-chol
59. Tong Yong-il
60. Ri Chang-han
61. Ri Yong-ju
62. Ri Gyu-man
63. Jong Yong-hak
64. Kim Thae-gu
65. Rim Un-guk
66. Kim Su-hak
67. Pak Gwan-bok
68. Yun Pyong-gwon
69. An Ji-yong
70. Ju Dong-chol
71. Choe Jae-bok
72. Kim Su-gil
73. Tae Jong-su
74. Pak Tae-song
75. Ri Man-gon
76. Jon Sung-hun
77. Pak Yong-ho
78. Pak Tae-dok
79. Kim Chun-sop
80. Pak Jong-nam
81. Ri Sang-won
82. Kang Yang-mo
83. Rim Kyong-man
84. Jo Chun Ryong
85. Ju Kyu-chang
86. Choe Chun-sik
87. Ri Je-son
88. Yu Jin
89. Ri Song-hak

== Awards and honors ==
A frame displaying Jon's decorations was placed at the foot of his bier during his funeral.
