= 13th State Affairs Commission =

Government organization of North Korea

- Emblem of the SAC Chairman

29 June 2016 – 12 April 2019 (2 years, 286 days) Overview
- Type: State Affairs Commission
- Election: 4th Session of the 13th Supreme People's Assembly

Leadership
- Chairman: Kim Jong-un
- Vice Chairmen: Pak Pong-ju; Choe Ryong-hae; Hwang Pyong-so

Members
- Total: 18

The 13th State Affairs Commission (SAC) of North Korea was elected by the 4th Session of the 13th Supreme People's Assembly on 29 June 2016. It was replaced on 11 April 2019 by the 14th SAC.

== Officers ==
=== Chairman ===
Name	Birth	Hangul	Took office	Left office	Duration
Kim Jong-un	1984	김정은	29 June 2016	12 April 2019	2 years and 287 days

=== Vice Chairman ===
Name	Birth	Hangul	Took office	Left office	Duration
Hwang Pyong-so	1949	황병서	29 June 2016	12 April 2018	1 year and 287 days
Pak Pong-ju	1939	박봉주	29 June 2016	12 April 2019	2 years and 287 days
Choe Ryong-hae	1950	최룡해	29 June 2016	12 April 2019	2 years and 287 days

== Members ==
=== 4th SPA Session (2016–18) ===
Rank	Name	Birth	Hangul	13th NDC	6th SES	Positions
1	Kim Jong-un	1984	김정은	Old	Renewed	Chairman of the State Affairs Commission
2	Hwang Pyong-so	1949	황병서	Old	Renewed	Vice Chairman of the State Affairs Commission
3	Pak Pong-ju	1939	박봉주	New	Renewed	Vice Chairman of the State Affairs Commission
4	Choe Ryong-hae	1950	최룡해	Old	Renewed	Vice Chairman of the State Affairs Commission
5	Kim Ki-nam	1934	김기남	New	Dismissed	—
6	Pak Yong-sik	1950	박영식	New	Renewed	—
7	Ri Su-yong	1940	리수용	New	Renewed	—
8	Ri Man-gon	1945	리만건	New	Dismissed	—
9	Kim Yong-chol	1946	김영철	New	Renewed	—
10	Kim Won-hong	1945	김원홍	Old	Dismissed	—
11	Choe Pu-il	1944	최부일	Old	Renewed	—
12	Ri Yong-ho	1956	리용호	New	Renewed	—

=== 6th SPA Session (2018–19) ===
Rank	Name	Birth	Hangul	4th SES	14th SAC	Positions
1	Kim Jong-un	1984	김정은	Old	Reelected	Chairman of the State Affairs Commission
2	Pak Pong-ju	1939	박봉주	Old	Reelected	Vice Chairman of the State Affairs Commission
3	Choe Ryong-hae	1950	최룡해	Old	Reelected	Vice Chairman of the State Affairs Commission
4	Pak Yong-sik	1950	박영식	Old	Demoted	—
5	Ri Su-yong	1940	리수용	Old	Reelected	—
6	Kim Yong-chol	1946	김영철	Old	Reelected	—
7	Choe Pu-il	1944	최부일	Old	Reelected	—
8	Ri Yong-ho	1925	리용무	Old	Reelected	—
9	Hwang Pyong-so	1949	황병서	Old	Dismissed	—
10	Kim Jong-gak	1944	김정각	New	Demoted	—
11	Pak Kwang-ho	1949	박광호	New	Demoted	—
12	Thae Jong-su	1936	태종수	New	Reelected	—
13	Jong Kyong-thaek	1961	정경택	New	Reelected	—
