= 14th State Affairs Commission =

Government organization of North Korea

- Emblem of the SAC Chairman

12 April 2019 – 22 March 2026 Overview
- Type: State Affairs Commission
- Election: 1st Session of the 14th Supreme People's Assembly

Leadership
- President: Kim Jong Un
- First Vice President: Choe Ryong-hae
- Vice President: Pak Pong-ju

Members
- Total: 19

The 14th State Affairs Commission (SAC) of North Korea was elected by the 1st Session of the 14th Supreme People's Assembly on 11 April 2019. Its tenure ended on March 22, 2026 with the election of the 15th State Affairs Commission which followed the establishment of the 15th Supreme People's Assembly.

== Members ==
=== 1st SPA Session (2019–20) ===
Rank	Name	Birth	Hangul	13th SAC	3rd SES	Positions
1	Kim Jong Un	1984	김정은	Old	Renewed	Chairman of the State Affairs Commission
2	Choe Ryong-hae	1950	최룡해	Old	Renewed	First Vice Chairman of the State Affairs Commission
3	Pak Pong-ju	1939	박봉주	Old	Renewed	Vice Chairman of the State Affairs Commission
4	Kim Jae-ryong	1934	김기남	New	Renewed	—
5	Ri Man-gon	1950	박영식	New	Renewed	—
6	Ri Su-yong	1940	리수용	Old	Recalled	—
7	Kim Yong-chol	1945	리만건	Old	Renewed	—
8	Thae Jong-su	1946	김영철	Old	Recalled	—
9	Ri Yong-ho	1945	김원홍	Old	Recalled	—
10	Kim Su-gil	1944	최부일	New	Renewed	—
11	No Kwang-chol	1956	리용호	New	Recalled	—
12	Jong Kyong-thaek	1956	리용호	Old	Renewed	—
13	Choe Pu-il	1956	리용호	Old	Recalled	—
14	Choe Son-hui	1956	리용호	New	Renewed	—

=== 3rd SPA Session (2020–onwards) ===
Rank	Name	Birth	Hangul	1st SES	Positions
1	Kim Jong Un	1984	김정은	Old	President of the State Affairs Commission
2	Choe Ryong-hae	1950	최룡해	Old	First Vice President of the State Affairs Commission
3	Pak Pong-ju	1939	박봉주	Old	Vice President of the State Affairs Commission
4	Kim Jae-ryong	1934	김기남	Old	—
5	Ri Man-gon	1950	박영식	Old	—
6	Kim Yong-chol	1945	리만건	Old	—
7	Kim Su-gil	1944	최부일	Old	—
8	Jong Kyong-thaek	1956	리용호	Old	—
9	Choe Son-hui	1956	리용호	Old	—
10	Ri Pyong-chol	1948	리병철	New	—
11	Kim Hyong-jun	1949	김형준	New	—
12	Kim Jong-gwan		김정관	New	—
13	Ri Son-gwon	—	리선권	New	—
14	Kim Jong-ho	—	김종호	New	—
