= Yonsa =

Yonsa may refer to:

- Yonsa (drug), a brand name for the medication abiraterone acetate
- Yonsa County, in North Korea
- Yonsa-ri, city in Changwon, South Korea (Around 330 kilometres southeast of Seoul)
