= Ju Sang-song =

North Korean politician (born 1933)

- Hangul: 주상성
- Hanja: 朱相成
- RR: Ju Sangseong
- MR: Chu Sangsŏng

Ju Sang-song (Korean: 주상성 born August 1933) is a North Korean politician and former Minister of People's Security.

== Biography ==
Ju Sang-song was born in Kangwon-do Province in 1933, joined the Korean People's Army in June 1951, and later attended the Kim Il Sung Military University. During his career, he served as senior operations staff officer of an army corps, brigade commander, divisional commander, chief of staff of regional headquarters, commander of an army corps and inspector of the General Staff.

In 1970 he was elected alternate member of the Central Committee of the Workers' Party of Korea at the 5th Party Congress, and he was first elected deputy to the Supreme People's Assembly in 1990. He served as chairman of the SPA Legislation Committee. On December 24, 1991, he was promoted to full member of the WPK Central Committee, during the same meeting (the 19th Plenary Meeting of the 6th Central Committee) that appointed Kim Jong Il as the new Supreme Commander of the Korean People's Army.

The 1990s saw an increase of his importance: in 1992 he was promoted to colonel general and served in Kim Il Sung's funeral committee in 1994. In February 1997 he was appointed general, right on Kim Jong Il's 55th birthday, and received command of the IV Army Corps in South Hwanghae Province.

In late 2003, Ju was recalled to Pyongyang and replaced Choe Yong-su as Minister of Public Security in 2004. He was also elected a member of the National Defence Commission in 2009, as part of a plan to expand the Commission membership.

In the spring of 2010, the Ministry of Public Security was put directly under the National Defence Commission and renamed Ministry of People's Security, with full responsibility over the Korean People's Internal Security Force. Ju Sang-song was confirmed its minister, although he was now under NDC Vice-chairman Chang Sung-taek. His status was furtherly enhanced at the September 2010 Conference of the Workers' Party of Korea, as he was re-elected Central Committee member and promoted to Politburo member.

Ju Sang-song's last public appearance was during a performance of the Korean People's Internal Security Forces Song and Dance Ensemble honouring Kim Jong Il's 69th birthday in February, 2011. He was officially dismissed on March 16 by decision of the NDC, with the Korean Central News Agency reporting: "Ju Sang Song, minister of People's Security of the National Defence Commission of the DPRK, was dismissed from his post due to illness".

Political offices
Preceded by Choe Yong-su	Minister of People's Security; Minister of Public Security (2004–2010); 2004–2011	Succeeded by Ri Myong-su
