= Jang Yong-chol =

North Korean diplomat

- Hangul: 장용철
- RR: Jang Yongcheol
- MR: Chang Yongch'ŏl

Jang Yong-chol (Korean: 장용철; 1964–2014?) is a North Korean former diplomat.

Jang is likely the son of Jang Myong-hui and Jang Song-kil, which would make him the nephew of Jang Song-thaek. He served in the Korean People's Army between 1980 and 1984 and attended Kim Il Sung University, studying economics.

Early in his career, Jang worked for the Kim Il Sung Youth League (KISYL), first, during the 1990s and early 2000s, as secretary and first secretary of the Pyongyang branch of KISYL. Between 2003 and 2007 Jang was a secretary of the central committee of KISYL.

Jang was appointed the North Korean ambassador to Nepal in 2007. He became the ambassador to Malaysia in August 2010. In late 2013, he was recalled following the execution of Jang Song-thaek. His current position and whereabouts are unknown. According to Yonhap, multiple sources reported he had been executed along with other members of Jang Song-thaek's family.
