= National Intelligence Agency (North Korea) =

North Korean secret police

- 국가정보국
- Ministry flag

Agency overview
- Formed: 1973; 53 years ago
- Jurisdiction: State Affairs Commission of North Korea
- Headquarters: Pyongyang, North Korea; 39°4′29″N 125°46′7″E
- Minister responsible: Ri Chang-dae, General Director

Korean name
- Hangul: 국가정보국
- Hanja: 國家情報省
- RR: Gukga jeongboguk
- MR: Kukka chŏngboguk

The National Intelligence Agency (Korean: 국가정보국), formerly known as the Ministry of State Security (Note: Other sources indicate that the agency's name is known as the State Security Department according to authors like Joseph Bermudez) (국가보위성), is the secret police agency of North Korea. It is an autonomous agency of the North Korean government reporting directly to the Supreme Leader. The agency is reputed to be one of the most brutal secret police forces in the world, and it has been involved in numerous human rights abuses.

It is one of two agencies that provide security or protection to North Korean officials and VIPs, alongside the Supreme Guard Command. The agency was known by its nickname as Saenggak kyŏngch'al (생각경찰) (Thought Police) under Kim Jong Un's reign as leader since taking power in December 2011.

== History ==
In 1945, the DPRK Security was established, being attached to the "Police Department". In 1948, it became Ministry of Internal Affairs (내무성 정치보위국) with the Bureau of Political Protection attached. In February 1949, it became the Political Security Agency (정치보위부). In September 1948, the National Political Affairs Department, which specializes in political in the North Korean region, was newly established.

On August 20, 1949, however, after Lee Chang-ok, the deputy secretary of the Republic of Korea, escaped from Haeju, then part of South Korea, along with Kim Kang and others, the organization was abolished after a massive purge. It was integrated into the Ministry of Social Safety (later known as the Ministry of People's Security). In 1951 it was renamed to Social Security Political Security Agency. In 1952, Department of Homeland Security. In 1962, it became Social and Political Security Agency (사회안전성 정치보위국). The SSD was created in 1973, being separated from the Ministry of Public Security.

Some defectors and sources have suggested that unlike its Eastern Bloc counterparts, State Security functions are actually conducted by several larger and different security bodies that operate under the Workers' Party of Korea (WPK) or the Korean People's Army (KPA, the North Korean armed forces), each with its own unique responsibilities and classified names that are referred to by code (e.g. Room 39), and that the agency is little more than a hollow shell used by the elite to coordinate their activities and provide cover for them.

The post of Security Department head was left vacant after Minister Ri Chun-su's death in 1987, although it was de facto if not de jure controlled by Kim Jong Il and the WPK Organization and Guidance Department he headed. In 1998, the MSS migrated under the National Defence Commission, also chaired by Kim Jong Il. Finally, in 2007, it was transferred under the WPK Administration Department, whose first vice director became responsible of the MSS daily work, but it continued to have obligations towards the Organization and Guidance Department.

In November 2011, it was reported that General U Tong-chuk had been appointed permanent minister of State Security, the first of this kind since 1987, filling a post left unoccupied for 24 years. This was almost concurrent with General Ri Myong-su's appointment as minister of People's Security. Other sources also claimed that Kim Jong Un worked at the State Security Department before and/or after his anointment as heir apparent in September 2010. Kim Won-hong was appointed minister in April 2012 as the position was restored following Kim Jong Il's death. He served as Kim Jong Un's aide until February 2017 when he was allegedly dismissed for filing false reports to Kim Jong Un and mishandling an aide of Kim Jong Un. He was formally replaced in October 2017 at a WPK central committee plenum by Jong Kyong-thaek. So Tae-ha is the vice minister, while Kim Chang-sop serves as the head of the political department of the ministry.

On October 21, 2021, the MSS was instructed not to excessively surveil North Koreans living near the Chinese-North Korean border who are known to be free from any ideological suspicions.

On November 18, 2025, Kim Jong Un visited MSS HQ with Minister of State Security Pang Tu-sop as part of celebrating 80 years of North Korean security apparatus.

In May 2026, it was reported that the MSS changed names to the National Intelligence Agency.

== Duties ==
The Ministry of State Security is tasked with investigating political and economic crimes in North Korea, especially crimes against the Kim family. It's also tasked with conducting VIP protection duties for North Korean diplomats and employees who work in various North Korean embassies, consulates and other foreign missions abroad. In addition to its internal security duties, it is involved in the operation of North Korea's concentration camps, prisons and various other hidden activities.

The ministry has been known to link up with various other government ministries and agencies to help them with their various missions.

== Agency directors ==
No.	Portrait	Minister	Took office	Left office
1	Lee Chang-ok이창옥 (李昌玉)	Lee Chang-ok 이창옥 (李昌玉)	1948	1949
2	Kim Byong-ha김병하 (金炳夏)	Kim Byong-ha 김병하 (金炳夏)	1973	1982
3	Jin Soo-lee김창봉 (李鎭洙)	Jin Soo-lee 김창봉 (李鎭洙)	1982	1987
4	Kim Ryong-yong최현	Kim Ryong-yong 최현	1988	1998
5	Kim Jong-il김정일	Kim Jong-il 김정일	1998	1999
6	Jang Song-thaek장성택	Jang Song-thaek 장성택	1999	2005
7	U Tong-chuk우동측	U Tong-chuk 우동측	2005	2012
8	Kim Won-hong김원홍	Kim Won-hong 김원홍	2012	2018
9	Jong Kyong-thaek정경택	Jong Kyong-thaek 정경택	2018	2022
10	Ri Chang-dae리창대	Ri Chang-dae 리창대	2022	Incumbent

== Ranks ==
Rank	Insignia
General	
Colonel General	
Lieutenant General	
Major General	
Senior Colonel	
Colonel	
Commander	
Major	
Captain	
Senior Lieutenant	
Lieutenant	
Junior Lieutenant	
