= Ri Yong-ho =

Ri Yong-ho may refer to the following two people:

- Ri Yong-ho (general) (1942 – presumed dead since 2012), a North Korean military officer
- Ri Yong-ho (diplomat) (born 1956), Minister of Foreign Affairs of North Korea 2016–2020

== See also ==
- Lee Young-ho, South Korean professional StarCraft player
