= Kim Rak-gyom =

North Korean general and politician

- Supreme Leader: Kim Jong Un

Personal details
- Party: Workers' Party of Korea

Military service
- Allegiance: North Korea
- Branch/service: Korean People's Army
- Rank: General

- Kim Rak-gyom
- Hangul: 김락겸
- RR: Gim Rakgyeom
- MR: Kim Rakkyŏm

Kim Rak-gyom (Korean: 김락겸) is the former head of North Korea's Strategic Rocket Forces.

Along with Ju Kyu-chang, he was elected to the Workers' Party of Korea's Central Military Commission in April 2012.

He is "the head of the strategic rocket forces" and "in charge of ballistic missile launches".

He was not present at an October 7, 2017, mass rally in Pyongyang and an October 11, 2017, celebration for the anniversary of the Workers' Party of Korea. According to a South Korean think tank, "There's little chance that Ri and Kim have been dismissed or purged because they've been praised for major achievements recently." and "It's highly likely that they were absent because they'd been given an important assignment."

Kim was reportedly replaced by Kim Jong-gil in October 2020.
