= Choe Kyong-song =

North Korean politician

Member of the Central Military Commission of the WPK
- Supreme Leader: Kim Jong-il; Kim Jong-un

Personal details
- Citizenship: North Korean
- Party: Workers' Party of Korea

Military service
- Allegiance: North Korea
- Branch/service: Korean People's Army
- Rank: Sangjang (Colonel-general)

Choe Kyong-song (Korean: 최경성) is a North Korean politician and colonel-general of the Korean People's Army. He was member of the 6th convocation of the Central Committee of the Workers' Party of Korea and since 2010 member of its Central Military Commission.

== Biography ==
In April 2010, he was promoted to the rank of general-colonel. During the 3rd Conference of the Workers' Party of Korea on September 28, 2010, he was elected a member of the Central Military Commission of the WPK and as member of the Central Committee.

In 2010, he a was member of the funeral commission of Jo Myong-rok. After Kim Jong-il's death in December 2011, Choe Kyong-song was in 73rd place in the 232-person Funeral Committee. He was also a member of the funeral committee of Ri Ul-sol. In February 2012 he was awarded the Order of Kim Jong-il.
