= Paek Se-bong =

North Korean politician

- Hangul: 백세봉
- Hanja: 白世鳳
- RR: Baek Sebong
- MR: Paek Sebong

Paek Se-bong (백세봉, born 1938) is a North Korean politician. Paek is a former member of the National Defence Commission of North Korea. He was named to the position in 2003, in a general reshuffling which saw the removal of older members including Ri Ul-sol and Kim Chol-man. Some have speculated that he is actually Kim Jong Chul, son of Kim Jong Il.

== See also ==
- Politics of North Korea
