= Kim Chun-sop =

North Korean politician

Member of the DPRK National Defense Commission
- Supreme Leader: Kim Jong Il

Personal details
- Born: North Pyongan Province, North Korea
- Citizenship: North Korean
- Party: Workers' Party of Korea

Korean name
- Hangul: 김춘섭
- Hanja: 金春燮
- RR: Gim Chunseop
- MR: Kim Ch'unsŏp

Kim Chun-sop (Korean: 김춘섭) is a North Korean politician who served as a member of the National Defense Commission and a member of the Supreme People's Assembly.

== Biography ==
In September 2010 he was appointed second secretary of the WPK Provincial Party Committee of Jagang Province, in 2013 he was appointed chief secretary. In April 2015, at the 3rd meeting of the 13th Supreme People's Assembly, he was elected a member of the National Defense Commission instead of Pak To-chun and as director of the WPK Munition Industry department. Prior to that appointment, he was ranked 79th in the country's hierarchy. He is under sanctions of the European Union.
