= Jang Song-thaek =

North Korean politician (1946–2013)

Vice Chairman of the National Defence Commission
- In office 7 June 2010 – 8 December 2013
- Supreme Leader: Kim Jong Il; Kim Jong Un
- Preceded by: Kim Yong-chun
- Succeeded by: Choe Ryong-hae

Minister of State Security
- In office 4 November 1999 – 8 December 2005
- Preceded by: Kim Jong Il
- Succeeded by: U Tong-chuk

Chairman of the State Physical Culture and Sports Guidance Commission
- In office 4 November 2012 – 8 December 2013
- Premier: Pak Pong-ju
- Supreme Leader: Kim Jong Un
- Preceded by: Office established
- Succeeded by: Choe Ryong-hae

Chief of the Central Administrative Department of Workers' Party
- In office 11 October 2007 – 8 December 2013
- Supreme Leader: Kim Jong Il; Kim Jong Un
- Preceded by: Office established
- Succeeded by: Kim Ki-nam

Personal details
- Born: 22 January 1946 Chongjin, Soviet Civil Administration (present-day North Korea)
- Died: 12 December 2013 (aged 67) Pyongyang, North Korea
- Cause of death: Execution by firing squad
- Party: Workers' Party of Korea (1970s–2013)
- Spouse: Kim Kyong-hui (m. 1972)
- Children: Jang Kum-song (1977–2006)
- Relatives: Kim family (by marriage); Jang Song-u (brother)

Korean name
- Hangul: 장성택
- Hanja: 張成澤
- RR: Jang Seongtaek
- MR: Chang Sŏngt'aek

Jang Song-thaek (Note: Romanized as Jang Sung-taek, Chang Sŏng-t'aek and other variations. Korean: 장성택; pronounced [tɕaŋ sʌŋ.tʰɛk]) (22 January 1946 – 12 December 2013) was a North Korean politician. He was married to Kim Kyong-hui — the only daughter of North Korean president Kim Il Sung and his first wife Kim Jong Suk, and the only sister of North Korean general secretary Kim Jong Il. He was the uncle of the current leader of North Korea, Kim Jong Un, by marriage.

The extent of Jang Song-thaek's power and position has not been confirmed in the West. However, in 2008 South Korean government officials and academic North Korea experts suggested that he had de facto leadership over North Korea while Kim Jong Il's health was declining and when Kim subsequently died. Jang was a vice-chairman of the National Defence Commission, a position considered second only to that of the supreme leader. He is believed to have been promoted to four-star general around the time of Kim Jong Il's death in December 2011, as his first appearance in uniform was while visiting Kim lying in state. Jang was considered a "key policy adviser" to Kim Jong Un.

In December 2013, Jang was abruptly accused of being a counter-revolutionary and was stripped of all his posts and expelled from the Workers' Party of Korea (WPK). His photos were removed from official media and his image digitally removed from photos with other North Korean leaders. On 13 December, North Korean state media announced he had been executed by firing squad.

== Early life and family ==
Jang was born in Chongjin, during the Soviet Civil Administration of Northern Korea. He graduated from the Kim Il Sung Senior High School before leaving for Moscow, where he studied at Moscow State University between 1968 and 1972. Following his return, he married Kim Kyong-hui, the younger (and only) sister of Kim Jong Il. The couple had a daughter, Jang Kum-song (1977–2006), who lived in Paris as an international student; she refused an order to return to Pyongyang and then reportedly committed suicide in September 2006, due to Jang and his wife's opposition to her relationship with her boyfriend.

== Early career ==
Beginning in the 1970s, Jang held a series of positions in the Workers' Party of Korea (WPK). His first post was as an instructor for the Pyongyang City Committee of the Workers' Party. In the late 1970s, however Jang's career stalled when he was sent away from the central party to be manager of a steel and ironworks in Nampo, an apparent demotion. Reports said that he was becoming too powerful or, according to other accounts, he had an over-ostentatious lifestyle. It was reported that Jang suffered severe burns in an industrial accident at the factory in Chollima/Kangson. His career recovered and he became deputy director of the Youth Work Department of the 6th WPK Central Committee in 1982 and director in 1985. He was first elected to the Supreme People's Assembly (SPA), North Korea's nominal parliament, in 1986.

In April 1989, Jang was made a People's Hero; in June 1989, he was elected an alternate member of the 6th Central Committee of the Workers' Party of Korea. In April 1992, he was named a member of the Order of Kim Il Sung. Later that year he was promoted to full member of the 6th Central Committee. He was a member of the funeral committee for Kim Il Sung in 1994. Jang was appointed to be the first deputy director (or vice director) of the WPK's Organization and Guidance Department in November 1995. He had been identified by outside analysts as well as North Korean defector and former high official Hwang Jang-yop as a possible successor to Kim Jong Il; however, on 25 November 2004, South Korea's National Assembly heard testimony that he had been purged from his position. Some South Korean intelligence reports indicated that Jang was under house arrest in Pyongyang, while others suggested he might have been sent for "reeducation".

== Rehabilitation ==
Korean Central News Agency on 29 January 2006 found that Jang had been reinstated in December 2005. At the time of the restoration, North Korean media reported that he was not the first deputy director of the organizing leadership of the Party Central Committee, but merely the first deputy director of the Party Central Committee. It is said that he was reinstated as the first deputy director of the Capital Construction Department. In 2005 and in September 2006, Jang was involved in auto accidents, the first leaving him hospitalized for five months. In one of the collisions his car was hit by a military truck, and there were rumors of an assassination plot. Jang re-emerged in March 2006, accompanying Kim Jong Il on an official visit to China. In October 2007, the Korean Central News Agency confirmed that Jang had been promoted to the newly recreated post of first vice-director of the Workers' Party of Korea, with oversight responsibility for the police, judiciary, and other areas of internal security; Jang attended South Korean president Roh Moo-hyun's luncheon during the latter's visit to the North. It was later revealed that Jang had been actually appointed director of the Administration Department, an old agency of the Workers' Party abolished in 1990 and re-created by splitting the Organization Department. He was elected to the National Defence Commission (NDC) in April 2009. He was made vice-chairman of the commission in summer 2010.

During this period he was a close ally of Kim Jong Il. Jang was still in the post four years later, in April 2013. The NDC was North Korea's de facto supreme decision-making body; Jang's promotion made him a key executive deputy, second only to Kim Jong Il. It is speculated that the move was part of posturing to make Kim Jong Il's son Kim Jong Un the next leader of North Korea. Jang's position in North Korean politics was also ostensibly boosted by the death of Ri Je-gang, a senior leader who was tipped by Kim Jong Il as a crucial overseer of the succession campaign.

== Under Kim Jong Un ==
On 25 December 2011, North Korean television Sunday showed Jang in the uniform of a general. A Seoul official familiar with North Korea affairs said it was the first time Jang had been shown on state television in a military uniform. His appearance suggested that Jang had secured a key role in the North's military, which had pledged its allegiance to Kim Jong Un. Jang's importance continued to be demonstrated during his 2012 visit to China: various aspects of the visit echoed protocol which had previously been followed only for Kim Jong Il, including half of his entourage arriving ahead of time as an advance party, with the Chinese ambassador to North Korea, Liu Hongcai, returning to China beforehand to greet Jang upon his arrival.

On 17 August 2012, Jang met with China's premier, Wen Jiabao in Ziguangge, Zhongnanhai. He met with Hu Jintao, General Secretary of the Chinese Communist Party (CCP), Wang Jiarui, head of International Liaison Department of the CCP and minister in charge of the national development and reform commission, Zhang Ping, minister of finance Xie Xuren, minister of commerce Chen Deming, Liaoning provincial Party Committee Secretary Wang Min, Jilin provincial Party Committee Secretary Sun Zhengcai, and vice foreign minister Zhang Zhijun. He was the head of a delegation of the joint steering committee for developing and managing the Rason Economic and Trade Zone and the Hwanggumpyong and Wihwa Islands Economic Zone. In the announcement, he was listed as chief of the central administrative department of the Workers' Party of Korea, a member of the WPK political bureau, and vice-chairman of the National Defense Commission.

Jang said Kim Jong Un believed that bilateral relations with China are important and that the "profound friendship will be passed on from generation to generation" between China and North Korea. At the meeting with Wen, Jang said: "The DPRK is willing to closely cooperate with China to accelerate relevant efforts and push forward cooperation in developing economic zones."

On 4 November 2012, the 6th WPK Politburo established a new State Physical Culture and Sports Guidance Commission, appointing Jang as its first chairman. An analyst suggested that this quiet promotion may have signaled a decline in Jang's status: in North Korea, "although sports can bring quick popularity, earn foreign exchange, raise patriotic fever, and help burn the energies of the youth and distract the masses from their daily hardships, it can never beat national security and socio-economic development in terms of its political significance. By asking Jang to chair the National Sports Commission, the young North Korean leader, less than a year into power, might have begun to nudge his uncle out of important policy deliberations."

In January 2013, speculation arose that Jang had been quietly promoted to top decision-making Politburo Presidium member, as his official hierarchy position was elevated, displacing then-Chief of General Staff Hyon Yong-chol and his own wife Kim Kyong-hui. An analyst argued that Jang might be appointed president of the Presidium of the Supreme People's Assembly (making him the nominal head of state of the DPRK) or Premier of North Korea, replacing officeholders who were in their 80s. Jang Song-thaek promoted the construction of a new bridge over the Yalu River between the Chinese city of Dandong and the Korean city of Sinuiju. As of December 2013, the bridge was nearly completed. That same month, Jang was not invited to the meeting of top North Korean officials handling national security and foreign affairs, following a rocket launch on 12 December 2012, and new international sanctions in response. Following Jang's fall from power, an analyst noted that Jang's "glaring absence" at the January 2013 meeting "signaled the emergence of a possible crack in the senior leadership, especially in the relationship between Kim and his all-powerful uncle, raising the possibility of divergent approaches between Kim and Jang" on North Korea foreign policy.

In late May 2013, Choe Ryong-hae, a vice-chairman of 6th Central Military Commission and director of the General Political Bureau of the Korean People's Army (KPA), was sent as Kim Jong Un's first special envoy to China, passing over Jang. An analyst viewed this as a "striking" choice, and noted that "it appears that as the perceived 'China man in Pyongyang'", Jang's "perceived close ties with China may have done a disservice to his standing in the eyes of Kim, exposed him to criticism of being too subservient to China, and made him vulnerable to any anti-China backlash in Pyongyang". Thought by analyst Alexandre Mansourov of 38 North to have been particularly unacceptable to Kim Jong Un were Jang's "continued expression of sympathy towards" Kim Jong-nam—Kim Jong Un's half-brother and Kim Jong Il's eldest son—who was living in exile under Chinese protection at the time.

According to the New York Times, the final straw came from a dispute over control of North Korea's west coast fisheries. These had been partly taken from the military by Jang Song-thaek in 2011, but later this decision was reversed and the fisheries were ordered returned to the military. Forces loyal to Jang defied the transfer, leading to a confrontation in late 2013, in which several North Korean soldiers loyal to Kim Jong Un were killed. Subsequent reinforcements sent by Kim Jong Un seized control of the fisheries.

== Downfall ==
Soon after, in November 2013, Jang's senior aides Ri Ryong-ha and Jang Su-gil were executed. Ri was reportedly accused of abusing his authority, while Jang Su-gil was found guilty of trying to organize a new faction and rejecting the system.

Jang was not seen in public after this time. On 3 December, he was dismissed from his post. On 7 December, his appearances were obscured or edited out from a news report (originally aired in October) that re-aired on Korean Central Television.

On 8 December, Jang Song-thaek was publicly expelled from the ruling Workers' Party of Korea, with state media attributing this to a decision of the Politburo. Jang was accused of having committed "anti-party, counter-revolutionary factional acts" that included illicit affairs with women; harboring "politically-motivated ambition"; weakening "the party's guidance over judicial, prosecution and people's security bodies" and obstructing "the nation's economic affairs".

Jang's arrest at a politburo meeting was broadcast on Korean Central Television, the state television broadcaster, in "the most public dismissal... in history" of a prominent North Korean official, and the first time since the 1970s that the arrest of a senior politician at a party meeting was shown on television. Wen Wei Po reported that Lee Yun-keol (the chairman for the Seoul-based North Korea Strategy Information Service Center) stated that Kim Jong-chul (Kim Jong Un's elder brother) had personally led his guards to arrest Jang. Lee said that "even Vice Marshal Choe Ryong-hae would not dare to carry out the arrest" himself (some analysts believe this may signal an expanded role for Kim Jong-chul in the regime).

A 2,700-word statement was released stating that the "despicable human scum Jang, who was worse than a dog, perpetrated thrice-cursed acts of treachery in betrayal of such profound trust and warmest paternal love shown by the party and the leader for him". The statement detailed many charges against Jang, stating that he "had desperately worked for years to destabilize and bring down the DPRK and grab the supreme power of the party and state by employing all the most cunning and sinister means and methods". The statement accused Jang of freeing "the undesirable and alien elements, including those who had been dismissed and relieved of their posts after being severely punished for disobeying the instructions of Kim Jong Il and 'let them work in the WPK CC [Korean Workers' Party Central Committee] Administrative Department and organs under it in a crafty manner'", which some analysts claim indicates that Jang had instigated a nationwide amnesty in January 2012 which included the closure of several North Korea prison camps and the release of prisoners. An analyst suggested that "since most of the political prisoners freed at that time are now deemed as Jang's factionists, most of them are likely to be returned to jail again". The statement accused Jang of bringing "serious harm to the youth movement in the DPRK, being part of the group of renegades and traitors in the field of youth work, bribed by the enemies".

An analyst believes that Choe Ryong-hae, "the party-appointed shepherd of the North Korean youth for over a decade" through his position in the Kim Il Sung Socialist Youth League, linked Jang to this crime. The statement accused Jang of seeking to enlarge his own power, "stretching his tentacles to all ministries and national institutions" and turning the Korean Workers' Party Central Committee Administration Department, which Jang led, into a "little kingdom which no one dares touch"; Kim Jong Un disbanded the Administrative Department after Jang's fall. The statement also said that Jang had "systematically denied the party line and policies, its organizational will" as if he were "a special being who could overrule either issues decided by the party or its line" and that Jang had been "disobeying the order of the Supreme Commander of the KPA" (i.e. undermining Kim's rule). He was also accused of undermining the Kim personality cult, which included placing a granite monument carved with the supreme leader's words "in a shaded corner"; letting "the decadent capitalist lifestyle find its way to our society by distributing all sorts of pornographic pictures among his confidants"; and "half-heartedly clapping, touching off towering resentment of our service personnel and people" when one of Kim Jong Un's promotions was announced.

== Execution ==
On 12 December 2013, Jang was tried by a special secret military tribunal of the Ministry of State Security and executed by firing squad, according to state media. Media reports claiming that he had been eaten alive by starving dogs were later determined to originate from a satirical piece on social media.

Chang Yong-seok, senior researcher at the Institute for Peace and Unification Studies at Seoul National University, said Jang was "the only one in the North who could talk about economic change. So, when I heard of Mr. Jang's execution, my first thought was that it was a death notice for those of us who have hoped for economic reform in the North."

Analysts of North Korean politics agreed that Jang's execution was the most significant since purges carried out in the late 1950s by Kim Il-Sung, Kim Jong-Un's grandfather and North Korea's founder; since 1960, purged top officials have not usually been killed, and the denunciations of purged figures have not typically been so extreme and public. Professor Charles K. Armstrong, an expert on North Korea at Columbia University, stated that "although high-ranking leaders, including members of the Kim family, have been deposed before, we haven't seen anything this public or dramatic since Kim Jong-un's grandfather Kim Il-sung purged his last major rivals in the late 1950s. This seems to indicate the divisions within the Kim regime were more serious than previously thought." Former U.S. National Security Council director for Asian affairs Victor Cha said that the purge and execution of Jang "tells you that everything's not normal ... When you take out Jang, you're not taking out just one person – you're taking out scores if not hundreds of other people in the system. It's got to have some ripple effect."

On the other hand, some analysts suggested that Jang's influence and role had been exaggerated. The South Korean ambassador and political science professor Moon Chung-in noted that there had been no policy shifts in the North Korean government and that some of Jang's closest associates, including Pak Pong-ju and Kang Sok-ju, had kept their positions. He also noted that Kim Jong-Un's cabinet continued to emphasize economic incentive systems, innovation, and economic cooperation with China. Moon said that "He [Jang] could, therefore, have been purged and executed because of his obsession with material and organizational interests that challenged Kim Jong-Un's reform initiative to streamline the country's economic management. If this turns out to be true, then Kim Jong-Un should be seen as a reformer, whilst Jang was a reactionary." In another analysis he stressed that Jang's removal had not weakened the government, which was actually more stable than before: "The politics of extensive surveillance, control, fear and intimidation are still alive and well. The party, the state, the military and security apparatus remain committed, effective and unified in purpose. The dramatic episode of Jang's downfall has created a formidable deterrent to any potential or actual opposing groups."

== Aftermath ==
After Jang's fall, experts speculated that purges of other top figures might follow. An anonymous source said Ji Jae-ryong, North Korean ambassador to China and a close associate of Jang, "will eventually be dealt with"; however South Korean diplomatic sources said it was "business as usual" at that embassy. In early December, Pyongyang recalled two ambassadors: from Malaysia Jang's nephew Jang Yong-chol, from Cuba Jang's brother-in-law Jon Yong-jin. Deputy tourism minister Jo Sung-goyu, another Jang relative, canceled a planned trip to a tourism summit in Kaohsiung, Taiwan.

The public received word of Jang's dismissal in the Rodong Sinmun on 12 December and were called to meetings to denounce Jang and pledge loyalty to Kim. Two days later, on 14 December, the Korean Central News Agency (KCNA) released a roster of six top officials appointed to a national committee in charge of organizing a state funeral for Kim Kuk-tae (a former Workers' Party official who recently died). The roster included the names of Jang's widow (Kim Jong Un's aunt), Kim Kyong-hui, and vice-premier, Ro Du-chol, indicating both survived the purge and remained in favor. KCNA and Rodong Sinmun began erasing references to Jang "as completely as possible", deleting some 100,000 and 20,000 news items from their websites, respectively.

The status of Kim Kyong-hui's relationship with Jang had been a subject of frequent speculation. Analysts believe that Jang and Kim Kyong-hui had been estranged. Yoon Sang-hyun, a National Assembly of South Korea deputy floor leader of the governing Saenuri Party, had said previously that Kim had been "separated" from Jang and did not oppose his purge. Following the execution, The Chosun Ilbo reported that Choe Ryong-hae may now be the "number 2-man" in North Korea. The South Korean newspaper reported claims that Kim Jong Il "asked Choe on his deathbed to help his son Jong-un" but that the North Korean military disapproves of Choe.

In January 2014, the South Korean Yonhap News Agency reported that the purge had extended to Jang's family, with all his relatives, including children, being rounded up and executed. According to a South Korean newspaper, Jang's nephew, O Sang-hon, was executed by being burnt alive with a flame thrower.

=== Reaction ===
- South Korea – The Yonhap News Agency reported that South Korea held a security ministers' meeting to discuss the North Korean situation. Kim Jang-soo chaired the meeting. Earlier in the week, president Park Geun-hye told a Cabinet meeting that "North Korea is now engaged in a reign of terror while carrying out a massive purge" to consolidate Kim Jong Un's power. The Unification Ministry issued a statement saying that: "The government has deep concerns about a recent series of developments in North Korea and is watching the situation closely." Defense chief minister Kim Kwan-jin told a parliamentary defense meeting on 13 December: "We will heighten readiness against North Korea as (Jang's execution) can lead to provocations against the South. This case can be seen as part of the reign of terror by Kim Jong-Un as he is seeking to consolidate his power with an iron fist."
- China – Following the reports of Jang's death, the foreign ministry stated only that the fall of Jang was a "domestic issue", but reports indicated that "China's North Korea experts have been working furiously to come up with [a] consensus" about the resulting implications. Foreign minister Wang Yi stated that China is observing the situation, but that it does not expect major shifts in North Korean policies.
- Japan – Chief cabinet secretary Yoshihide Suga told the Kyodo News agency that the Japanese government was "closely watching the situation" and that "We will calmly monitor the situation while communicating with other countries and collect relevant information."
- Sweden – Foreign minister Carl Bildt condemned the execution as "Stalinist" and stated: "I think that what we see now publicly is only the surface of an empire of horror."
- United Kingdom – Prime minister David Cameron's official spokesman told reporters at a daily press briefing: "If this is confirmed, it is another example of the extreme brutality of the North Korean regime." Hugo Swire, minister of state at the Foreign Office, said: "We are deeply concerned to learn of the execution. This is another example of the brutality of the North Korean government, and we have consistently raised concerns about severe and systematic human rights abuses. The UN is currently running a commission of inquiry and it is quite right that we do everything we can to investigate North Korea's appalling human rights record. More broadly, we remain deeply concerned about the impact of this unpredictable regime on stability in the region. Our embassy in Pyongyang is monitoring the situation closely and we will continue to maintain close contact with our allies on this." Lord Alton of Liverpool, chair of the North Korea All-Party Parliamentary Group, said Jang "represented for many the real hope for reform in North Korea" and stated that Jang's execution was a "bloody and vivid and brutal reminder of the inherent and cruel nature of a regime that has always modelled itself on Stalin's USSR" and its gulag system.
- United States – State Department deputy spokeswoman Marie Harf told the media on 12 December 2013: "While we cannot independently verify this development, we have no reason to doubt the official KCNA report that Jang Song Thaek has been executed. If confirmed, this is another example of the extreme brutality of the North Korean regime." The following day, at the State Department's press briefing, Harf stated that "we would urge the North Koreans not to take provocative acts, not to do so going forward, because it's not in the interest of regional stability". Patrick Ventrell, deputy spokesman for the White House National Security Council, told the Yonhap News Agency that, "if confirmed, this is another example of the extreme brutality of the North Korean regime... We are following developments in North Korea closely and consulting with our allies and partners in the region." Secretary of State John F. Kerry stated in an interview broadcast on ABC's This Week on 15 December that Jang's fate "tells us a lot about … how ruthless and reckless" and "insecure" Kim Jong Un is, and described Kim as "spontaneous, erratic, still worried about his place in the power structure and maneuvering to eliminate" potential competitors. Kerry stated that Kim leads a "ruthless, horrendous dictatorship" and urged the denuclearization of North Korea. Senator John McCain, member of the Senate Foreign Relations Committee, said of Kim on CNN's State of the Union: "I think it's very obvious this young man is capable of some very aberrational behavior, and given the toys that he has, I think it's very dangerous. You would think that the Chinese would understand that, as well. They've got to rein this young man in—and they can."
- United Nations – Secretary-General Ban Ki-moon, formerly the South Korean foreign minister, stated on 16 December that he found reports of the execution to be "very dramatic and surprising" and appealed for calm, stating: "At this time, I would appeal to all the parties concerned, surrounding the Korean Peninsula, while they must be vigilantly and carefully watching the development of situation, not to take any premature actions. I do not hope that because of that there will be some increase of tensions on the Korean Peninsula." Ban stated: "The period ahead should be used to build confidence in the international community and to improve living conditions for the country's long-suffering people. I stand ready to offer my good offices." Ban reiterated the United Nations' longstanding stance against capital punishment "under any circumstances" and urged North Korea to comply with Security Council resolutions, which North Korea has frequently flouted.

== Alleged survival ==
Former U.S. basketball star Dennis Rodman told DuJour Magazine that during his visit to North Korea in January 2014, Jang Song-thaek was not actually executed, contrary to the claims of the North Korean government, and Jang stood behind him in a photo shoot. He reaffirmed his assertion after the magazine asked him to clarify. Rodman also denied reports of the execution of Hyon Song-wol and claimed she was also at the photo shoot; she was later confirmed to still be alive after she appeared on North Korean television. Jeong Chang-chang, director of the Unified Strategy Research Office of the Sejong Institute, made another claim about Jang Song-thaek's continued survival, arguing that no senior officials were present at the time of the purported execution and that Jang Song-thaek was actually placed under house arrest and enjoying the same living conditions as before.

== See also ==
- China–North Korea relations
- Damnatio memoriae
- Media coverage of North Korea
- North Korea–United States relations
- Kim dynasty
- Unperson
