= Kang Phyo-yong =

North Korean military officer and politician

Member of the WPK Central Committee

Personal details
- Political party: Workers' Party of Korea
- Occupation: Military officer, politician

Korean name
- Hangul: 강표영
- RR: Gang Pyoyeong
- MR: Kang P'yoyŏng

Kang Phyo-yong (Korean: 강표영) is a North Korean military officer and politician. He holds the rank of Lieutenant General in the Korean People's Army Ground Force. As of 2012, he is a member of the Central Committee of the Workers' Party of Korea.

== Career ==
In October 1995, Kang was promoted from Senior Colonel to Major General in the Korean People's Army. He was subsequently promoted to Lieutenant General, and in September 2010 he was elected to the politburo of the Workers' Party of Korea at the Congress of September 2010.

Kang served as a member of the national mourning committee upon the deaths of Jo Myong-rok in 2010 and Kim Jong Il in December 2011.
