= Choe Ryong-su =

North Korean politician

Choe Ryong-su (Korean: 최룡수) was a North Korean politician. He was a member of the Workers' Party of Korea. Between July 2003 and July 2004 he served as Ministry of People's Security when he was replaced by Ju Sang-song.

Political offices
Preceded by Paek Hak-rim	Minister of People's Security; 2003–2004	Succeeded by Ju Sang-song
