= Pyon In-son =

North Korean politician and military officer (born 1946)

Personal details
- Born: 11 March 1946 Pyongyang, Soviet Civil Administration
- Died: 14 January 2015 (aged 68) North Korea
- Citizenship: North Korean
- Party: Workers' Party of Korea
- Occupation: Military officer, politician

Military service
- Allegiance: North Korea
- Branch/service: Korean People's Army
- Rank: Major general

Pyon In-son (Korean: 변인선, 11 March 1946 – 14 January 2015) is a North Korean politician and military officer, colonel general and from March 2012 commander of the 4th Corps of the Korean People's Army.

== Biography ==
He received his general qualifications and the rank of major-general (kor. 소장) in 1992. He was promoted to the rank of two-star lieutenant-general (kor. 중장) on April 13, 1997. In July 2003 he was promoted to the rank of colonel general (kor coronation). Former commander of the 7th Corps of the Korean People's Army, in August 2011 he was appointed commander of the 4th Corps of the Korean People's Army, which is stationed in South Hwanghae Province. He replaced General Kim Kyok-sik in this position.

During the 3rd Korean Workers' Party of Korea Conference on September 28, 2010, he was elected a member of the Central Committee of the Workers' Party of Korea. Member of the eleventh and twelfth convocations of the Supreme People's Assembly, the North Korea's unicameral parliament. After the death of Kim Jong-il in December 2011, Pyon In-son was ranked 63rd in the 232-person Funeral Committee. According to specialists, places on such lists defined the rank of politician in the hierarchy of the power apparatus.

In February 2012, he accompanied Kim Jong-un during the inspection of the 4th Corps barracks.

== Award and honors ==
A picture of Pyon shows him wearing all decorations awarded to him in ribbon form.

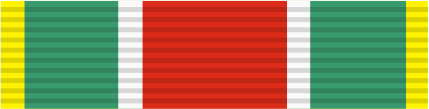

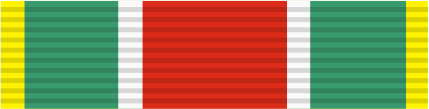

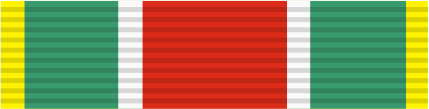
