= List of members of the National Defence Commission =

List of members of the National Defence Commission may refer to:

- Members of the 5th National Defence Commission, elected by the 1st Session of the 5th Supreme People's Assembly in 1972.
- Members of the 6th National Defence Commission, elected by the 1st Session of the 6th Supreme People's Assembly in 1977.
- Members of the 7th National Defence Commission, elected by the 1st Session of the 7th Supreme People's Assembly in 1982.
- Members of the 8th National Defence Commission, elected by the 1st Session of the 8th Supreme People's Assembly in 1986.
- Members of the 9th National Defence Commission, elected by the 1st Session of the 9th Supreme People's Assembly in 1990.
- Members of the 10th National Defence Commission, elected by the 1st Session of the 10th Supreme People's Assembly in 1998.
- Members of the 11th National Defence Commission, elected by the 1st Session of the 11th Supreme People's Assembly in 2003.
- Members of the 12th National Defence Commission, elected by the 1st Session of the 12th Supreme People's Assembly in 2009.
- Members of the 13th National Defence Commission, elected by the 1st Session of the 13th Supreme People's Assembly in 2014.
