= U Tong-chuk =

- 우동측

Minister of State Security
- In office 2005–2012
- Supreme Leader: Kim Jong Il; Kim Jong un
- Preceded by: Jang Song-thaek
- Succeeded by: Kim Won-hong

Personal details
- Born: 8 August 1942 Pyongwon County, South Pyongan Province, Japanese-controlled Korea
- Citizenship: North Korean
- Party: Workers' Party of Korea
- Education: Kim Il Sung University
- Occupation: Politician

Military service
- Allegiance: North Korea
- Branch/service: Korean People's Army
- Rank: Colonel general

U Tong-chuk or Woo Dong-cheuk (Korean: 우동측; born August 8, 1942) is a North Korean official. He was a politburo member of the Central Committee of the Workers' Party of Korea. In addition, he was head of State Security Department from 2005 to 2012. After February 2012, he disappeared from public after attending celebrations for late leader Kim Jong-il's birthday.

According to official North Korean state media, U graduated from Kim Il-sung University with a philosophy degree. He later served in a number of minor posts in the Organization and Guidance Department of the Workers' Party of Korea before being moved to a leading position in the Ministry of State Security (or State Security Department) in the 1990s. He was promoted to colonel-general, member of the National Defence Commission, and first vice-minister of State Security in 2009. This put him in charge of the ministry and gave him access to the country's top echelon, as the ministry was reportedly under Kim Jong-il directly, and he accompanied Kim Jong-il on a number of tours and official events, including a dinner with former US President Bill Clinton. On 28 September 2010, the 3rd Party Conference elevated him to member of the Politburo and the Central Military Commission; the day before he had been promoted to general of the Korean People's Army.

After Kim Jong-il's death in December 2011, U was seen accompanying the late leader's hearse and was reported having a role in purging the Ministry of State Security to ensure loyalty to Kim Jong-un. He has disappeared from public since February 2012 and his posts had been taken over by Kim Won-hong by April 2012.

In July 2013, U Tong-chuk showed up along with other former officials at events marking the 60th anniversary of the end of the Korean War.
