= Hong Sung-mu =

North Korean nuclear scientist (born 1942)

- Born: 1 January 1942 (age 84)
- Known for: North Korea's weapons of mass destruction
- Scientific career
- Fields: Nuclear weapons research
- Institutions: Machine Building Industry Department, Yongbyon Nuclear Scientific Research Center
- Patrons: Kim Jong Un

Korean name
- Hangul: 홍승무
- RR: Hong Seungmu
- MR: Hong Sŭngmu

Hong Sung-mu (Korean: 홍승무, born 1 January 1942) is a North Korean nuclear weapons scientist and a Workers' Party of Korea (WPK) official working with North Korea's weapons of mass destruction and space programs. He is the deputy director of the party's Machine Building Industry Department (MBID) and plays a key part in the country's nuclear weapons program.

Hong rose to prominence after the 2011 death of Kim Jong Il and succession of Kim Jong Un, after which he has supervised various weapons tests, including the 2013 and January 2016 North Korean nuclear tests. Hong's involvement in weapons development has landed him on international sanctions lists.

== Career ==
Hong was born on 1 January 1942. He was educated in Central and Eastern Europe, and possibly in the Soviet Union too.

Hong plays an important role in North Korea's weapons of mass destruction and space programs. While Hong's responsibility includes conventional weapons, his work focuses on the nuclear weapons program in particular.

Hong was formerly the chief engineer at the Yongbyon Nuclear Scientific Research Center. Currently he is the deputy director of the party's Machine Building Industry Department (MBID), where he has worked since the mid-2000s. Since 2010, he has been the number two man of Workers' Party of Korea (WPK) secretary Pak To-chun. Hong's background is in manufacture and production rather than development and research, as opposed to his superior in the MBID, Ju Kyu-chang.

Hong's career took off in earnest after the 2011 death of Kim Jong Il, the country's leader, and the succession of Kim Jong Un. Hong was number 126 on the funeral committee list of Kim Jong Il. Since 2012, he has accompanied Kim on the occasion of various rocket test launches, and on on-the-spot guidance tours since the beginning of 2013. As of 2013, Hong is an alternate member of the Central Committee of the WPK.

Hong played a key part supervising the 2013 and January 2016 North Korean nuclear tests. He has appeared in the North Korean media in connection to those tests, the December 2012 launch of the Kwangmyŏngsŏng-3 satellite, and the country's 2017 nuclear test.

Hong and his fellow associate in the nuclear weapons program, Ri Hong-sop, are known collectively as North Korea's "nuclear duo". The two were the first in line to receive a medal from Kim Jong Un for success in the January 2016 test. Hong's role in the nuclear program has landed him on the sanctions list of either the United Nations, United States, or South Korea. The European Union has added Hong on its "list of persons and entities responsible for the DPRK's nuclear-related, ballistic-missile-related or other weapons of mass destruction-related programmes or persons or entities acting on their behalf or at their direction, or entities owned or controlled by them, subject to restrictive measures".

According to professor Yang Moo-jin of the University of North Korean Studies in Seoul, Hong is "spearheading the nuclear development programme as a senior party official". North Korea expert Michael Madden calls Hong part of a last generation of "top-level officials ... who studied in the old communist world".

== Works ==
- Albrecht, D.; Ero, J.; Fodor, Z.; Hernyes, I.; Hong Sung Mu; Khomenko, B.A.; Khovanskij, N.N.; Koncz, P.; Krumstein, Z.V.; Merekov, Y.P.; Petrukhin, V.I.; Seres, Z. (1979). "Investigation of the (p, nd) Reaction on ^{6}Li and ^{7}Li at 670 MeV". Nuclear Physics A. 322 (2–3): 512–525. doi:10.1016/0375-9474(79)90441-X.
