= O Kum-chol =

Personal details
- Born: February 24, 1947 (age 79) Pyongyang, North Korea
- Citizenship: North Korean
- Party: Workers' Party of Korea
- Education: Red Flag Mangyongdae Revolutionary School
- Alma mater: Kim Chaek Air Force Academy
- Occupation: Military officer, politician

Military service
- Allegiance: North Korea
- Branch/service: Korean People's Army
- Rank: General

O Kum-chol (Korean: 오금철; born February 24, 1947) is an army general and politician in the Democratic People's Republic of Korea (North Korea). He is a vice-chief of the General Staff Department of the Korean People's Army and a member of the Central Military Commission of the Workers' Party of Korea.

His father, O Paek-ryong, was the former director of the General Escort Bureau. His brother, O Chol-san, is a political member of the Naval Command of the Korean People's Army.

== Biography ==
O graduated from Red Flag Mangyongdae Revolutionary School, joined the Korean People's Army Air and Anti-Air Force and served as an air force pilot.

After graduating from Kim Chaek Air Force Academy and the Soviet Air Force Academy, he became Chief of Staff of the 7th Air Force Division in 1984 and became Deputy Commander of the 3rd Air Force in April 1987 (Chair). In 1990, he served as the commander of the 3rd Air Force in the rank of Major General. From 1991 to 1992, he served as the first commander of the Air Force and Anti-Air Command.

After being promoted to Lieutenant General of the Korean People's Army in April 1992, he was promoted to the Colonel General of the Korean People's Army in October 1995 and appointed to the Air Force Commander. In April 2008, he resigned from command of the Air Force. Currently, he is Vice-Chief of the General Staff of the Korean People's Army.

In September 2010, he was elected to the Central Committee of the Workers' Party of Korea. In 1990, he was elected to the 9th convocation of the Supreme People's Assembly. At the time of the death of Jo Myong-rok in 2010 and death of Kim Jong-il in 2011, he was a member of the funeral committee.
