= Yonsa County =

Yonsa County 연사군
- County

Korean transcription(s)
  - Hanja: 延社郡
  - McCune-Reischauer: Yŏnsa kun
  - Revised Romanization: Yeonsa-gun
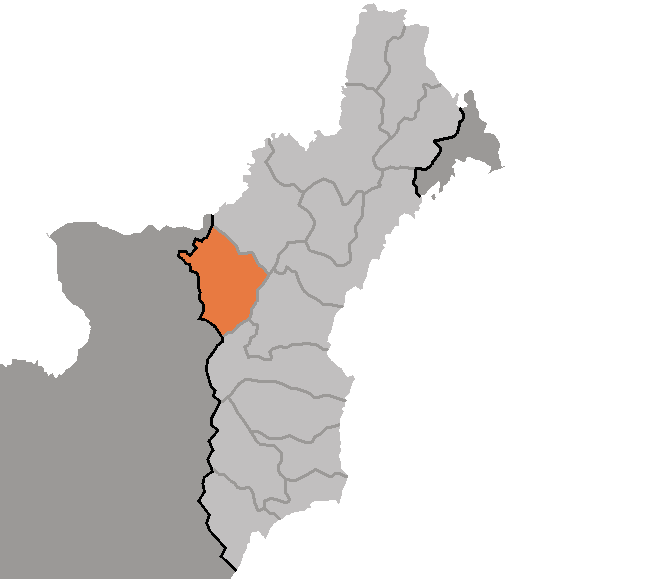
- Map of North Hamgyong showing the location of Yonsa
- Country: North Korea
- Province: North Hamgyong Province
- Administrative divisions: 1 ŭp;, 1 workers' district, 10 ri

Area
  - Total: 1,200 km^{2} (460 sq mi)

Population (2008 census)
  - Total: 37,876
  - Density: 32/km^{2} (82/sq mi)

Yŏnsa County is a kun, or county, in North Hamgyŏng province, North Korea. It was created following the division of Korea, being split off from Musan county in the 1952 reorganization of local government.

== Geography ==
The land of Yŏnsa is high and mountainous, with even the low-lying areas more than 500 meters above sea level. The county is traversed by the Hamgyŏng Mountains and the Paengmu Plateau. Various streams flow through the county, including the Yŏnmyŏnsu (Chosŏn'gŭl: 연면수, Hancha: 延面水), Kuunsu (Chosŏn'gŭl: 구운수, Hancha: 九雲水), Sudongsu (Chosŏn'gŭl: 수동수), and Sŏdusu (Chosŏn'gŭl: 서두수, Hancha: 西頭水). 84% of the county is forested. The highest point is Kwanmobong (Chosŏn'gŭl: 관모봉, Hancha: 冠帽峰).

== Administrative divisions ==
Yŏnsa County is divided into 1 ŭp (town), 1 rodongjagu (workers' districts) and 10 ri (villages):

- Yŏnsa-ŭp
- Sinyang-rodongjagu
- Kwangyang-ri
- Namchang-ri
- P'also-ri
- Rop'yŏng-ri
- Samha-ri
- Samp'o-ri
- Sinbung-ri
- Sinchang-ri
- Sŏksu-ri
- Yŏnsu-ri

== Economy ==
Lumbering dominates the economy of Yŏnsa, and there are numerous lumbermills. Wild roots and fruits are also gathered from the mountains.

There is very little agriculture, due to the lack of arable land; the farming that is carried out is chiefly dry-field farming. Yŏnsa is responsible for more than half of North Hamgyŏng's potato crop. Cultivated land makes up 4.3% of the county's area.

== Transportation ==
Yŏnsa lies on the Paengmu Line of the Korean State Railway, and is also served by roads.

== See also ==
- Geography of North Korea
- Administrative divisions of North Korea
