= Pak To-chun =

North Korean politician (1944–2022)

Member of the WPK Politburo
- Supreme Leader: Kim Jong-un

Personal details
- Born: 1944 Jagang Province,
- Died: 2022 (aged 77–78)
- Citizenship: North Korean
- Party: Workers' Party of Korea
- Education: Kim Il-sung Higher Party School

Korean name
- Hangul: 박도춘
- Hanja: 朴道春
- RR: Bak Dochun
- MR: Pak Toch'un

General Pak To-chun (Korean: 박도춘; 9 March 1944 – 27 July 2022) was a politician of North Korea.

According to his official biography, Pak was born in Jagang Province in 1944 and joined the Korean People's Army in 1960 (becoming a general in 2012). He later graduated from the exclusive Kim Il-sung Higher Party School and worked in a number of party posts in factories and mines. He was first elected to the Supreme People's Assembly in 1998. He ascended to leading provincial posts in the late 1990s, becoming chief secretary of the Jagang Committee of the Workers' Party of Korea (WPK) in 2005. He oversaw the modernization of the province's arms-production facilities and the building of the Huichon Power Station, highlighted as models for "the building of a thriving nation."

In September 2010 he was made WPK Central Committee member at the 3rd Party Conference, and jumped to the leadership core as Politburo alternate and secretary for military affairs. He was also elected to the National Defence Commission (NDC) in April 2011 and promoted to Politburo full member in April 2012, largely replacing Jon Pyong-ho as North Korea's military industry manager. In that capacity, Pak supervised the Kwangmyongsong-3 and Kwangmyongsong-3 Unit 2 launches in 2012, as well as a controversial nuclear test in February 2013.

Pak was demoted from member of the NDC in April 2015. Hong Sung-mu, deputy director of the party's Machine Building Industry Department, is considered Pak's number two man.

Party political offices
Preceded by Yon Hyong-muk	Chief Secretary of the WPK Jagang Committee; 2005–2010	Succeeded by Ryu Yong-sop
