= Pak Yong-sik =

North Korean general (born 1950)

Minister of Defence
- In office 11 July 2015 – 4 June 2018
- Supreme Leader: Kim Jong Un
- Preceded by: Hyon Yong-chol
- Succeeded by: No Kwang-chol

Personal details
- Born: Pak Yong-sik; 1950 (age 75–76) Pyongyang, North Korea
- Party: Workers' Party of Korea

Military service
- Allegiance: North Korea
- Branch/service: Korean People's Army
- Rank: General

- Pak Yong-sik
- Hangul: 박영식
- Hanja: 朴永植
- RR: Bak Yeongsik
- MR: Pak Yŏngsik

Pak Yong-sik (born 1950) is a senior North Korean military officer and Workers' Party of Korea (WPK) politician, who served as the country's defence minister from 2015 to 2018. Pak is the 6th Defense Minister appointed by Kim Jong Un. Pak is a member of the Central Military Commission of the Workers' Party of Korea.

Pak Yong-sik was appointed vice-director of the Political Department of the Korean People's Army sometime before January 2015, having previously served as an official of the Ministry of People's Security. He was promoted to general in April 2015, and shortly thereafter he took over the post of minister of the People's Armed Forces after his predecessor, Hyon Yong-chol, was demoted for insubordination. His promotion was publicly revealed on 11 July, though the exact date of his appointment is unknown.

In June 2018, it was announced that he had been sacked about a week before the summit between North Korea and the United States, and was replaced in the position by No Kwang-chol, the first vice minister of the Ministry of People's armed forces.

== Summary of service ==
=== Assignment history ===
- April 1999: Major general (sojang) (소장)
- April 14, 2009: Lieutenant general (chungjang) (소장)
- April 2014: Colonel general (sangjang) (상장)
- 2015: Army general (taejang) (대장)

Political offices
Preceded by Hyon Yong-chol	Minister of People's Armed Forces; 2015–2018	Succeeded by No Kwang-chol
