= Ri Ul-sol =

North Korean marshal (1921–2015)

Commander of the Supreme Guard Command
- In office February 1996 – 2003
- Leader: Kim Jong Il

Member of the National Defence Commission
- In office February 1990 – 2003
- Leader: Kim Jong Il

Personal details
- Born: 14 September 1921 Songjin, Kankyōhoku-dō, Japanese-ruled Korea
- Died: 7 November 2015 (aged 94) Pyongyang, North Korea
- Citizenship: North Korean
- Awards: Order of Kim Il Sung; Hero of Labour; Order of the National Flag (1st class); Hero of the DPRK (twice)

Military service
- Allegiance: North Korea
- Branch/service: Korean People's Army
- Years of service: 1930s–2004
- Rank: Marshal
- Battles/wars: World War II; Korean War

Korean name
- Hangul: 리을설
- Hanja: 李乙雪
- RR: Ri Eulseol
- MR: Ri Ŭlsŏl

Ri Ul-sol (Korean: 리을설; 14 September 1921 – 7 November 2015) was a North Korean politician and military official. He played an important role in the administrations of Kim Il Sung and Kim Jong Il, achieving the rank of marshal of the Korean People's Army. He was responsible for the safety of top North Korean leaders and their families as Commander of the Guard.

== Early life and education ==
Ri Ul-sol was born in 1921 in Songjin, North Hamgyong Province.

He may have been trained at the Okeanskaya Field School in Vladivostok or in the RKKA Military Academy in Khabarovsk, both in the Soviet Union.

== Military career ==
In the late 1930s, Ri was a soldier in Kim Il Sung's United Army, which was a partisan unit. He fought for Korea's independence from Japan alongside Kim Il Sung in World War II. Ri served in the 88th Sniper Brigade with Kim Il Sung, Kim Chol-man and other first-generation North Korean politicians. During the outbreak of the Korean War, Ri Ul-sol was responsible for the care of Kim Jong Il and Kim Kyong-hui, the children of Kim Il Sung. It is said that Ri assumed the position of surrogate father to Kim Jong Il, the future North Korean leader.

He was promoted through the North Korean military system, earning the following ranks:

Rank/position	Date promoted	Unit
Regiment Commanding Officer	August 1948	(unknown regiment)
Chief of Staff	July 1950	4th Division, Korean People's Army
Commanding Officer	April 1951	3rd Regiment, 15th Division, Korean People's Army
Major General	March 1957	Korean People's Army
Division Commander	March 1957	(unknown division)
Lieutenant General	October 1962	Korean People's Army
Commanding Officer	October 1962	5th Army Corps, Korean People's Army
Commanding Officer	March 1968	1st Army Corps, Korean People's Army
Colonel General	February 1972	Korean People's Army
General	April 1985	Korean People's Army
Vice Marshal	April 1992	Korean People's Army
Marshal	October 1995	Korean People's Army
Commanding Officer	February 1996	Guard Command, Korean People's Army

He was one of only a handful to have been promoted to the rank of Marshal, the second highest North Korean military rank. (The others are or were Kim Jong Il, O Jin-u, Choe Kwang, Kim Jong Un, Kim Yong-chun, Hyon Chol-hae, Ri Pyong-chol and Pak Jong-chon). His full title was Marshal of the Korean People's Army. In his other major position, Commander of the Guard (1996–2003), he was responsible for guarding the top North Korean officials, including Kim Jong Il and his family. The Guard Command is one of the few military positions which show little turnover, as Ri managed to hold onto his position from 1984 to 2003. Furthermore, Ri Ul-sol became a member of the Central Military Commission of the WPK in October 1980, and a member of the National Defence Commission in May 1990.

== Political career ==
Ri was a deputy delegate to the 3rd, 8th, 9th, 10th, 11th and 12th Supreme People's Assemblies. In the 10th SPA, he represented Electoral District 583, and in the 12th SPA, he represented Electoral District 1. He was also a member of the Central Committee of the Workers' Party of Korea in November 1970.

He was part of the Funeral Committees for both Kim Il Sung and O Jin-u. The funeral committees are often seen as an indicator of de facto power.

Politically, Ri Ul-sol was one of the last surviving members of the first generation of North Korean leadership. He was seen as an ultraconservative. He retired from most of his positions in 2003 during a reshuffle and was subsequently not considered to be a major player in North Korean politics.

== Awards ==
Ri Ul-sol was the recipient of various awards, including the Order of Kim Il Sung, Hero of Labour and Order of the National Flag (1st class). He was twice awarded the title of the Hero of the DPRK.

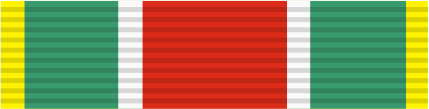

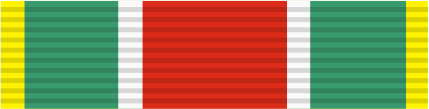

== Death ==
Ri Ul-sol died of lung cancer on 7 November 2015. His funeral committee consisted of 169 members, with Kim Jong Un as chairman.
