= Kim Il-chol =

North Korean politician (1933–2023)

- 김일철
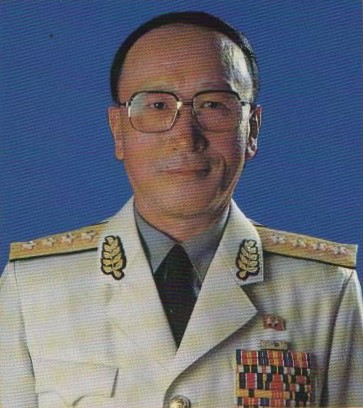

Minister of Defense of North Korea
- In office 1998–2009
- Preceded by: Choe Kwang
- Succeeded by: Kim Yong-chun

Personal details
- Born: 1933 Heijō, Korea, Empire of Japan
- Died: September 2023 (aged 89–90) Pyongyang, North Korea
- Resting place: Patriotic Martyrs' Cemetery
- Citizenship: North Korean
- Party: Workers' Party of Korea
- Awards: Hero of the Republic; Order of Kim Il Sung; Order of the National Flag

Military service
- Allegiance: North Korea
- Branch/service: Korean People's Navy
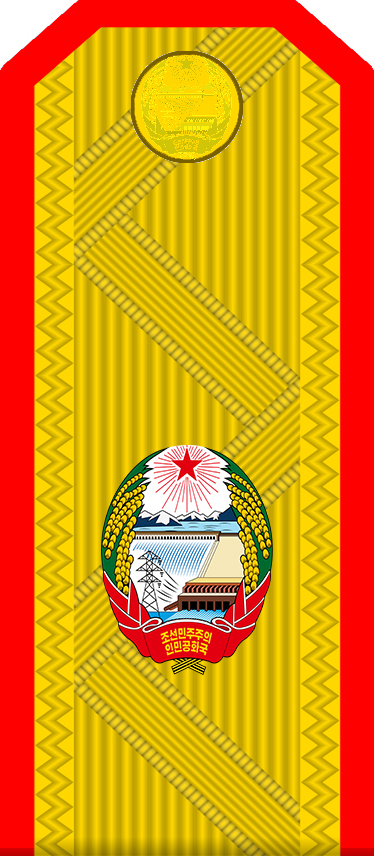
- Rank: Ch'asu (Vice Marshal)
- Battles/wars: Korean War; Siege of Wonsan; Pueblo incident

Korean name
- Hangul: 김일철
- Hanja: 金鎰喆
- RR: Gim Ilcheol
- MR: Kim Ilch'ŏl

Kim Il-chol (Korean: 김일철, 1933 – September 2023) was a North Korean military officer who was a member of the National Defence Commission and Minister for Defence.

== Biography ==
Kim was born in Pyongyang in 1933. He graduated from Mangyongdae Revolutionary School and the Soviet Union Naval Academy. Although the North Korean Army mainly depends on ground troops, Admiral Kim, who was commander of the Korean People's Navy since 1982, was in 1998 installed in the highest military position, the Minister of the People's Armed Forces. This filled a vacancy left by Choe Kwang, who died in February 1997, and indicated that he was fully trusted by Kim Jong Il. Kim Il-chol participated as a senior delegate in the inter-Korean defense minister's meeting held for the first time since the division of the Korean peninsula in September 2000.

Kim was appointed to the National Defence Commission in 1988. He was removed from all positions in 2010, reportedly due to his advanced age.

Kim was a member of the Korea-China Association for Civil Exchange Promotion.

Kim was awarded the Hero of the Republic, Order of Kim Il Sung, and the Order of the National Flag (1st Class).

Kim died in Pyongyang in September 2023, at the age of 90.
