= Choe Ryong-hae =

North Korean politician (born 1950)

- 최룡해
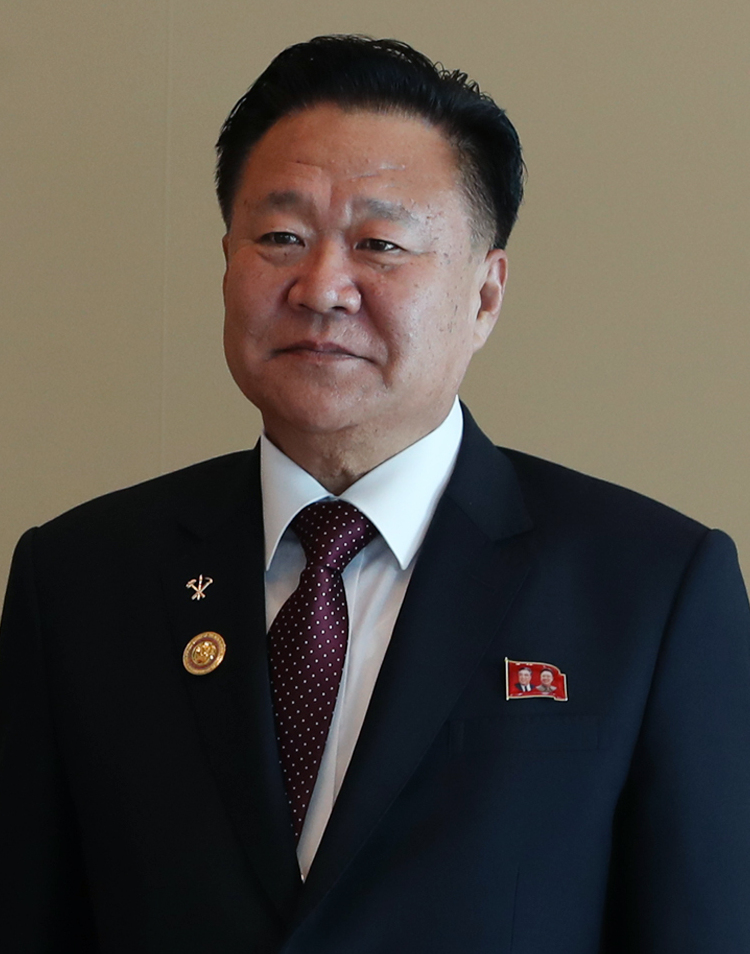
- Choe in 2019

Chairman of the Standing Committee of the Supreme People's Assembly
- In office 11 April 2019 – 22 March 2026
- Leader: Kim Jong Un
- Preceded by: Kim Yong-nam
- Succeeded by: Jo Yong-won

First Vice President of the State Affairs Commission
- In office 11 April 2019 – 22 March 2026
- President: Kim Jong Un
- Preceded by: Position established
- Succeeded by: Jo Yong-won

Vice President of the State Affairs Commission
- In office 29 June 2016 – 11 April 2019
- President: Kim Jong Un

Director of the Organization and Guidance Department
- In office October 2017 – 10 April 2019
- Chairman: Kim Jong Un
- Preceded by: Kim Jong Un
- Succeeded by: Ri Man-gon

Vice Chairman of the Central Military Commission
- In office 11 April 2012 – April 2014
- Chairman: Kim Jong Un
- Preceded by: Ri Yong-ho & Kim Jong Un
- Succeeded by: Hwang Pyong-so

Vice Chairman of the National Defence Commission
- In office 9 April 2014 – 25 September 2014
- Chairman: Kim Jong Un
- Preceded by: Jang Song-thaek
- Succeeded by: Ri Yong-mu & O Kuk-ryol

Director of the General Political Bureau of the Korean People's Army
- In office 12 April 2012 – 26 April 2014
- Supreme Commander: Kim Jong Un
- Preceded by: Jo Myong-rok
- Succeeded by: Hwang Pyong-so

Personal details
- Born: 15 January 1950 (age 76) Sinchon County, South Hwanghae, North Korea
- Party: Workers' Party of Korea
- Children: 3
- Parent: Choe Hyon (father)
- Relatives: Kim Yo Jong (daughter-in-law)
- Education: Kim Il Sung University

Military service
- Allegiance: North Korea
- Branch/service: Korean People's Army
- Rank: Ch'asu (Vice Marshal)

Korean name
- Hangul: 최룡해
- Hanja: 崔龍海
- RR: Choe Ryonghae
- MR: Ch'oe Ryonghae
- Central institution membership: 2016-present: Member, Presidium of the Political Bureau of the 7th Central Committee of the Workers' Party of Korea; 1986-present: Full Member, 6th, 7th Central Committee of the Workers' Party of Korea; 2010–2012: Alternate Member, Political Bureau of the 6th Central Committee of the Workers' Party of Korea; 2010–2016: Member, Secretariat of the Workers' Party of Korea; 2012-present: Full Member, Political Bureau of the 6th, 7th Central Committee of the Workers' Party of Korea; 2016-present: Member, Executive Policy Bureau of the Workers' Party of Korea

Choe Ryong-hae (Korean: 최룡해; born 15 January 1955) is a North Korean politician and military officer who served as the Chairman of the Standing Committee of the Supreme People's Assembly and First Vice President of the State Affairs Commission, holding both positions from April 2019 to March 2026.

Born in 1950 to prominent North Korean guerilla Choe Hyon, Choe joined the Korean People's Army in 1967. His political career began in the 1970s, when he worked as a political instructor on behalf of the Workers' Party of Korea (WPK) at Kim Il Sung University. He rose in the politics of the League of Socialist Working Youth of Korea; when it was reformed into the Kim Il Sung Socialist Youth League in 1996, he was appointed its first secretary. In 1998, he faced execution for selling scrap metal to foreign buyers without official permission, but survived after North Korean leader Kim Jong Il's sister Kim Kyong-hui intervened to save his life.

Choe later became the deputy director of the General Affairs Department, then chief secretary of the Hwanghae Province Party Committee from 2006 to 2010. In 2010, he became a KPA General as well as member of the WPK Secretariat and Central Military Commission, and Politburo alternate member. In 2012, after Kim Jong Un became leader, he became Vice Marshal, member of the Presidium of the Politburo of the WPK, vice chairman of the Central Military Commission, director of the KPA General Political Bureau and member of the National Defence Commission. He briefly served as the NDC Vice Chairman in 2014, but was demoted, and briefly lost his Politburo Presidium membership.

From 2016 to 2021, he served as a Vice Chairman of the Workers' Party of Korea. In 2017, Choe was appointed to the party's Central Military Commission. He was also appointed the director of the Organization and Guidance Department (OGD). In April 2019, he became the Chairman of the Standing Committee of the Supreme People's Assembly and the First Vice President of the State Affairs Commission. During this period, he also served as Kim Jong Un's military second-in-command, being third top-ranking official in North Korea after Kim Jong Un and Premier Pak Thae-song. On 22 March 2026, he was succeeded by Jo Yong-won as the SPA Standing Committee Chairman.

== Early life ==
Choe Ryong-hae was born in Sinchon County, South Hwanghae Province, on 15 January 1950, to Choe Hyon, who fought as a guerrilla affiliated Northeast Anti-Japanese United Army alongside Kim Il Sung and subsequently served as defence minister of North Korea. As such, Choe is considered a second-generation revolutionary from a privileged background. He joined the Korean People's Army (KPA) in 1967 and graduated from Kim Il Sung University as a political and economic expert.

== Career ==
Choe's political career began in the 1970s when he worked as a political instructor on behalf of the Workers' Party of Korea (WPK) at Kim Il Sung University. In the 1980s, he was a leading member of the League of Socialist Working Youth of Korea, being its vice-chairman from 1981 and chairman from 1986; when it was reformed into the Kim Il Sung Socialist Youth League in 1996, he was appointed its first secretary. In 1986, he was also elected deputy to the Supreme People's Assembly (SPA), member of the SPA Presidium and full member of the Central Committee of the WPK. In the 1990s, he also led the DPR Korea Football Association and the Taekwando Association of Korean Youth. He was awarded the title Hero of the DPRK in 1993. He was replaced as first secretary of the Youth League by Ri Il-hwan at the 14th plenary meeting of the league's central committee (January 1998), officially "due to his illness". This was actually because routine party audits found he was selling scrap metal to foreign buyers without official permission. He was facing execution but Kim Kyong-hui, only sister of then leader Kim Jong Il, intervened to save his life.

After facing re-education through labour, Choe was deputy director of the General Affairs Department of the WPK Central Committee, then chief secretary of the Hwanghae Province Party Committee from 2006 to 2010. In September 2010, during the 3rd Conference of the Workers' Party of Korea, he was promoted to KPA General as well as member of the WPK Secretariat and Central Military Commission, and Politburo alternate member. He was also appointed secretary for military affairs.

Choe did not receive particular public attention until General Secretary Kim Jong Il's death in December 2011. Choe was then seen as a key asset in securing Kim Jong Un's leadership. In April 2012, he received important promotions to Vice Marshal, member of the Presidium of the Politburo of the WPK, vice-chairman of the Central Military Commission, director of the KPA General Political Bureau and member of the National Defence Commission (NDC), largely filling the post left unoccupied by Jo Myong-rok's death and working as power broker for Kim Jong Un.

Choe, considered a protégé of Jang Song-thaek, is seen as part of a plan by Kim Jong Un to restore party control over the military after it was overturned by Kim Jong Il and his Military First Policy, particularly after Vice Marshal Ri Yong-ho's dismissal. In fact, Choe does not have a strong military background and seems to support the employment of soldiers to build civilian facilities. The Chosun Ilbo reports that a diplomatic source said Choe is appointing Socialist Youth League members to key military posts and "has assumed control of various businesses run by the military, losing trust and loyalty among the troops." Choe's inspections are the only ones, besides Kim Jong Un's and the Premier's, to be reported nationwide by state media.

By December 2012, Choe was demoted from Vice Marshal to General, as he was listed KPA General at a national meeting marking the first death anniversary of Kim Jong Il on 16 December and at the inaugural ceremony of the Kumsusan Palace of the Sun, though he wore KPA Vice Marshal insignia at the rally celebrating the successful Kwangmyŏngsŏng-3 Unit 2 launch on 14 December. This would be concurrent with Hyon Yong-chol's demotion to the same rank and Kim Jong-gak's removal as defence minister, and may be a consequence of the army's growing dissatisfaction over Choe's tenure. Choe was seen inexplicably wearing the Vice Marshal insignia again at a meeting in February 2013 and became Kim Jong Un's special envoy for strategic partner China.

Choe was appointed the first-ranking vice-chairman of the NDC in April 2014, apparently reinforcing his number two position, but he was replaced by newly appointed Vice Marshal Hwang Pyong-so as chief of the KPA politburo, and was officially demoted from the NDC after only five months, thus ending his involvement in military affairs. North Korea's news agency reported later on that he was party secretary in charge of labor organizations and chairman of the State Physical Culture and Sports Guidance Commission, a post previously held by Jang Song-thaek, and then part of a delegation to South Korea to attend the closing ceremony of the Asian Games. He was also restored to his Presidium position in late October, and finally demoted from it next February, although he remained a high-ranking member of the Politburo. Reports suggested arrogance and bad reputation among the elites as reasons leading to his downgrading. He was, however, reelected as a Presidium member at the 7th Party Congress in May 2016.

In November 2014, Choe brought a letter from Kim Jong Un to Russian president Vladimir Putin.

Choe's second son, Choe Song, was reported in January 2015 to have married Kim Jong Un's younger sister, Kim Yo Jong in late 2014.

In 2017, Choe was appointed to the party's Central Military Commission.

In October 2017, he was appointed the director of the Organization and Guidance Department (OGD). Before his appointment, OGD had been long headed either formally or informally by members of the Kim family. His immediate predecessor had been Kim Jong Un.

=== Chairman of the Standing Committee of the Supreme People's Assembly ===
In April 2019, he became the President of the Presidium of the Supreme People's Assembly.

In 2020, SPA Presidium held a session presided by Choe, which passed the Law on Rejecting Reactionary Ideology and Culture. The law imposes penalty ranging from forced labor to death for those that want to keep or distribute cultural materials, such as TV programs, books and songs from “hostile countries,” such as South Korea, Japan and the United States.

During the 9th WPK Congress, Choe was excluded from the 9th Central Committee of the Workers' Party of Korea. On 22 March 2026, he was succeeded by Jo Yong-won as the SPA Standing Committee Chairman.

== Sanctions ==
In December 2018, the United States Department of State and the Office of Foreign Assets Control imposed sanctions on Choe and two other North Korean officials for suspected human rights abuses and state-sponsored censorship activities.

== Personal life ==
Choe reportedly has two sons and one daughter. In 2014, his second son, Choe Song, reportedly married Kim Yo Jong, the sister of Kim Jong Un.

== Awards and honors ==
The official portrait of Choe shows Choe wearing all the decorations awarded to him.

Assembly seats
| Preceded by Kim Yong-nam | President of the Presidium of the Supreme People's Assembly; 2019–present | Incumbent |
Government offices
| Vacant Title last held by Jo Myong-rok (1st Vice Chair of National Defence Commission) | First Vice President of the State Affairs Commission; 2019–present | Incumbent |
Party political offices
| Preceded by | First Secretary of the Kim Il Sung Socialist Youth League; 1986–1998 | Succeeded by Ri Il-hwan |
| Preceded by Kim Jong Un; Ri Yong-ho | Vice Chairman of the Central Military Commission; 2012–2014; Served alongside: Ri Yong-ho (2012); Hyon Yong-chol (2012–2013) | Vacant Title next held by Pak Jong-chon |
| Preceded by Kim Yong-su | Director of the WPK Workers' and Social Organizations Department; 2014–2017 | Succeeded by Ri Il-hwan |
| Preceded by Jang Song-thaek | Chairman of the State Physical Culture and Sports Guidance Commission; 2014–2017 | Succeeded by Choe Hwi |
| Preceded by Kim Jong Un | Director of the WPK Organization and Guidance Department; 2017–2019 | Succeeded by Ri Man-gon |
Military offices
| Vacant Title last held by Jo Myong-rok | Director of the KPA General Political Bureau; 2012–2014 | Succeeded by Hwang Pyong-so |
