= Ju Kyu-chang =

North Korean politician (1928–2018)

Ju Kyu-chang 주규창

Personal details
- Born: 25 November 1928 Korea, Empire of Japan
- Died: 3 September 2018 (aged 89) Pyongyang, North Korea
- Citizenship: North Korean
- Party: Workers' Party of Korea
- Occupation: politician government official

Ju Kyu-chang (25 November 1928 – 3 September 2018) was a North Korean politician, who served as the director of the Workers' Party of Korea's (WPK) Machine-Building Industry Department.

Ju was reportedly the head of North Korea's nuclear and missile programs. His background was in research and development, as opposed to his deputy director Hong Sung-mu, who is more manufacture-oriented.

He was santioned in 2013 by United States.

Ju died in Pyongyang on 3 September 2018 from pancytopenia.

== Awards and honors ==
A frame displaying Ju's decorations was placed at the foot of his bier during his funeral.
