= Kim Yong-chun =

North Korean soldier and politician (1936–2018)

Marshal Kim Yong-chun

Minister of People's Armed Forces
- In office February 2009 – April 2012

Vice Chairman of the National Defense Commission of North Korea
- In office 9 April 2009 – 13 April 2014

Personal details
- Born: 4 March 1936 Pochon County, Kankyōnan Province, Korea, Empire of Japan
- Died: 16 August 2018 (aged 82) Pyongyang, North Korea
- Party: Workers' Party of Korea
- Education: Kim Il Sung Military University; Frunze Military Academy

Military service
- Allegiance: North Korea
- Branch/service: Korean People's Army
- Years of service: 1986–2018
- Rank: Marshal

Korean name
- Hangul: 김영춘
- Hanja: 金永春; 金英春
- RR: Gim Yeongchun
- MR: Kim Yŏngch'un

Kim Yong-chun (Korean: 김영춘; 4 March 1936 – 16 August 2018) was a North Korean military officer and politician. He was a leader of the North Korean military. He held the North Korean military rank Chasu (Vice Marshal), was Vice Chairman of the National Defense Commission of North Korea, and was Minister of People's Armed Forces (roughly corresponds to Minister of Defence in other countries). He held a minor post within the Workers Party.

== Early life ==
Kim was born in 1936 in Pochon County, Kankyōnan Province, Korea, Empire of Japan (now in Ryanggang Province, North Korea). He attended the Mangyongdae Revolutionary School and the Kim Il Sung Military University before starting his career in the party apparatus and the Korean People's Army.

== Career ==
He served as secretary of the South Pyongyang Provincial Committee of the Workers' Party of Korea in the 1960s and was elected alternate member of the WPK Central Committee in 1980 at the 6th Party Congress. In 1986 he was elevated to Central Committee full member, director of the KPA General Staff Operations Bureau and deputy to the Supreme People's Assembly. He was abruptly purged in 1988 along with Chief of General Staff O Kuk-ryol for disputes with O Jin-u.

Kim Yong-chun reappeared in the 1990s as he was promoted to general and director of the General Munitions Mobilization Bureau. He also oversaw the disbandment of the North Hamgyong Province's Sixth Army Corps, accused of corruption. In 1995, after O Jin-u's death, he was promoted to Vice Marshal and Chief of the KPA General Staff, a post he held until 2007, when he was appointed a vice-chairman of the National Defence Commission.

Kim Yong-chun was reputedly close to Kim Jong Il and a member of his court of aides. He received new promotions in 2009 as Minister of People's Armed Forces and in 2010 as member of the Politburo and the Central Military Commission.

In December 2011, after the leader's death, he was ranked 5th among members of the Kim Jong Il funeral committee, immediately after Kim Jong Un and the Politburo Presidium members (Kim Yong-nam, Choe Yong-rim and Ri Yong-ho), signalling his powerful position in the new leadership.

He was replaced as Minister by Kim Jong-gak and appointed director of the WPK Civil Defense Department in April 2012. Although displaced from all significant leading posts, he was awarded the largely honorary rank of Marshal of the Korean People's Army in April 2016.

== Death ==
Kim Yong-chun died on 16 August 2018 from myocardial infarction, aged 82. Many notable figures were involved on his funeral committee, including Kim Jong Un and Kim Yong-nam.

== Awards and honors ==
A frame with Kim's awards and honors was displayed during his funeral, showing all the decorations he had received.

Hero of the Republic

Order of Kim Il Sung, twice

Order of Kim Jong Il

Order of the National Flag First Class, eight times

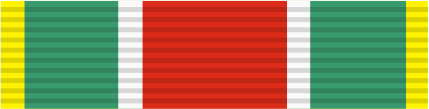
Order of Korean Labour, twice

Commemorative Order "Anniversary of the Foundation of the People's Army", twice

Commemorative Order "20th Anniversary of the Foundation of the Democratic People's Republic of Korea", twice

Commemorative Order "Foundation of the Democratic People's Republic of Korea", twice

Order of the National Flag Second Class, twice

Order of Freedom and Independence Second Class

Commemorative Order "50th Anniversary of the Foundation of the Democratic People's Republic of Korea", twice

Order of the Red Banner of Three Great Revolutions

Commemorative Order "40th Anniversary of Fatherland Liberation War Victory"

Order of the National Flag Third Class, three times

Medal For Military Merit, twice

Commemorative Medal "Fatherland Liberation"

Commemorative Medal "The Foundation of the People's Republic of Korea", twice

He also received multiple watches signed with Kim Il Sung and Kim Jong Il's signature.

Political offices
| Preceded by Kim Il-chol | Minister of People's Armed Forces; 2009–2012 | Succeeded by Kim Jong-gak |
Military offices
| Preceded by Choe Kwang | Chief of the General Staff of the Korean People's Army; 1995–2007 | Succeeded by Kim Kyok-sik |
