= Ri Yong-mu =

North Korean politician (1925–2022)

- 리용무

Vice-Chairman of the National Defence Commission
- In office September 1998 – 29 June 2016
- Supreme Leader: Kim Jong Il

Head of the KPA General Political Department
- In office August 1973 – October 1977
- Preceded by: Han Ik-su

Personal details
- Born: 25 January 1925 Heijō, Korea, Empire of Japan
- Died: 27 January 2022 (aged 97) Pyongyang, North Korea
- Resting place: Patriotic Martyrs' Cemetery
- Citizenship: North Korean
- Party: Workers' Party of Korea

Military service
- Allegiance: North Korea
- Branch/service: Korean People's Army
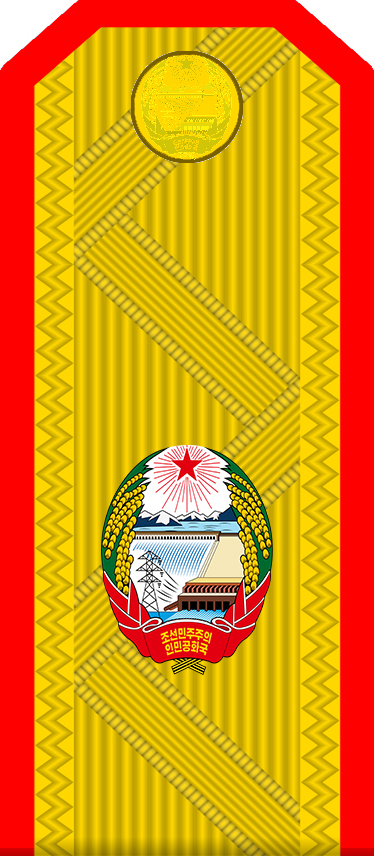
- Rank: Ch'asu (Vice Marshal)

Korean name
- Hangul: 리용무
- Hanja: 李勇武
- RR: Ri Yongmu
- MR: Ri Yongmu

Ri Yong-mu (Korean: 리용무; 25 January 1925 – 27 January 2022) was a North Korean senior official who was a member of the Politburo of the Workers' Party of Korea, vice-chairman of the National Defence Commission of North Korea and vice-marshal of the Korean People's Army. He was the oldest member of the central leadership of North Korea.

== Biography ==
Ri was born in South Pyo'ngan Province, Pyo'ngso'ng in Korea, Empire of Japan on 25 January 1925. He attended the second central political school.

=== Under Kim Il Sung (1948–1994) ===
After the establishment of North Korea, Ri was named military attache to the North Korean embassy in the People's Republic of China.

In 1964 he was made first vice-chairman of the Politburo of the Korean People's Army (not to be confused with the Politburo of the Workers' Party of Korea) and promoted to lieutenant general.

At the 5th Congress of the Workers' Party in 1970 he was elected to the Central Committee. In 1973 he was promoted to general and made chairman of the Politburo of the Korean People's Army. He was subsequently elected to the Politburo of the Workers' Party of Korea in 1974.

Ri was purged in 1977 and demoted to a low administrative position. He was however rehabilitated a decade later and made an alternate member of the 6th Central Committee in 1988, to be finally restored to full central committee member in 1989.

=== Under Kim Jong Il (1994–2011) ===
Ri was elected to the National Defence Commission in 1998, being also promoted to the second highest military rank of vice-marshal. He was reelected in 2003 and 2009. As the Workers' Party politburo, central military commission and central committee were de facto suspended under Kim Jong Il's "military first" policy from 1994 to 2010, the National Defence Commission became in practice the highest decision-making body in the country and Ri hence part of the innermost circle of power.

When in 2010 Kim Jong Il revived Workers' Party operations after 16 years of dormancy, Ri was also elected to the politburo.

=== Under Kim Jong Un (2011–2022) ===
Upon the death of Kim Jong Il in 2011, Ri was ranked 13th in the funeral committee. This presumably corresponds to his ceremonial rank in the top leadership at that time.

Ri retained his place in the Politburo at the 4th Party Conference in 2012, and was reelected to the National Defence Commission by the 13th Supreme People's Assembly.

=== Death ===
Ri died from a myocardial infarction on 27 January 2022, at the age of 97 just two days after his birthday.

== See also ==
The Father of Korea (The Sun of Juche)
