= National Defense Commission (North Korea) =

North Korean government organ responsible for military and national defense affairs

National Defense Commission of the Democratic People's Republic of Korea
- 조선민주주의인민공화국 국방위원회

Commission overview
- Formed: 1972; 54 years ago
- Dissolved: 2016; 10 years ago
- Superseding Commission: State Affairs Commission
- Jurisdiction: Government of the Democratic People's Republic of Korea
- Commission executives: Kim Jong-un, First Chairman; Hwang Pyong-so, Vice Chairman; Ri Yong-mu, Vice Chairman; O Kuk-ryol, Vice Chairman

Korean name
- Hangul: 조선민주주의인민공화국 국방위원회
- Hanja: 朝鮮民主主義人民共和國國防委員會
- RR: Joseon minjujuui inmin gonghwaguk gukbang wiwonhoe
- MR: Chosŏn minjujuŭi inmin konghwaguk kukpang wiwŏnhoe

The National Defense Commission of the Democratic People's Republic of Korea (NDC) was the highest state institution for military and national defense leadership in North Korea. It served as the highest governing institution of the country from 1998 until 2016 when it was replaced by the State Affairs Commission.

The National Defense Commission was established in 1972 as a body subordinate to the Central People's Committee, which was the highest state institution for policymaking in North Korea. It was separated from the Central People's Committee in 1992, and was designated as the supreme military leadership institution of state power. The Central People's Committee was dissolved in 1998, leaving the NDC to become the highest governing institution in North Korea. In 2009, the commission was further designated as the supreme national defense leadership institution of state power.

The consisted of a chairman, first vice chairman, vice chairmen and members. The chairman was the highest official in North Korea, and the office was always held by the supreme leader. The NDC was disestablished in 2016 under the leadership of Kim Jong Un, being replaced by the State Affairs Commission, with the NDC to be convened only during times of war.

== History ==
The National Defense Commission started as the National Defense Commission of the Central People's Committee of the Democratic People's Republic of Korea (조선민주주의인민공화국 중앙인민위원회 국방위원회), which was created on 27 December 1972 by the 1972 Constitution as one of the commissions that were subordinate to the Central People's Committee.

The commission was separated from the Central People's Committee on 9 April 1992 through an amendment of the 1972 Constitution, and became the National Defense Commission of the Democratic People's Republic of Korea. It was also designated as the "supreme military leadership institution of state power."

The Central People's Committee was dissolved and replaced by the Cabinet at the first session of the 10th Supreme People's Assembly on 5 September 1998, leaving the National Defense Commission to become the highest governing institution in North Korea that same day through an amendment of the 1972 Constitution that abolished the office of President of North Korea. It was designated as the "supreme military leadership and overall national defense management institution of state power." Since an amendment of the 1972 Constitution on 9 April 2009, the National Defense Commission was designated as the "supreme national defense leadership institution of state power."

The National Defense Commission continued to be the highest leadership body in North Korea until 29 June 2016 when an amendment to the 1972 Constitution created the State Affairs Commission of the Democratic People's Republic of Korea (조선민주주의인민공화국 국무위원회), which was designated as the new highest leadership body in the country, with the National Defense Commission being disbanded to be convened only during times of war.

== Functions ==
The 1972 Constitution mandated the National Defense Commission to be one of the commissions that are subordinate to the Central People's Committee in order to assist it in its work.

The 1992 amendment to the 1972 Constitution separated the National Defense Commission from the Central People's Committee and was designated the following functions as the "supreme military leadership institution of state power":

- Guide the overall armed forces and defense-building work of the State
- Appoint or dismiss key military officials
- Institute military ranks and promote officers above the general-grade officer rank
- Proclaim a state of emergency and mobilization order
- Issue decisions and orders

The 1998 amendment to the 1972 Constitution made the National Defense Commission as the highest governing institution in North Korea and was designated the following functions as the "supreme military leadership and overall national defense management institution of state power":

- Direct the whole armed forces and defense upbuilding of the State
- Establish or abolish central bodies in the field of national defense
- Appoint or remove important military cadres
- Enact military ranks and confer military ranks higher than a general
- Proclaim a state of war and mobilization order in the country
- Issue orders and decisions

The 2009 amendment to the 1972 Constitution relegated the National Defense Commission to a supervisory role as certain powers were introduced for the chairman of the National Defense Commission. The following functions were mandated for the National Defense Commission as the "supreme national defense leadership institution of state power":

- Establish important policies of the state for carrying out the military-first revolutionary line
- Guide the overall armed forces and defense-building work of the state
- Supervise the status of executing the orders of the chairman of the National Defense Commission of the Democratic People's Republic of Korea and the decisions and directives of the National Defense Commission, and establish relevant measures
- Rescind the decisions and directives of state organs that run counter to the orders of the chairman of the National Defense Commission of the Democratic People's Republic of Korea and to the decisions and directives of the National Defense Commission
- Establish or abolish central organs of the national defense sector
- Institute military titles and confer military titles above the general grade officer rank
- Issue decisions and directives

The National Defense Commission is responsible to the Supreme People's Assembly.

As a defense issues guider and coordinator, the security organizations in North Korea are subordinate to the Commission and among them are the Korean People's Army, the Ministry of People's Armed Forces and the Ministry of State Security and the Ministry of Social Security.

== Organization ==
From 1972 until 2012, the National Defense Commission consisted of a chairman, first vice chairman, vice chairmen and members.

The Chairman of the National Defense Commission was the head of the commission, and was the de facto highest official in North Korea from 1998 until 2009 and the de jure supreme leader of North Korea from 2009 until 2012. The chairman of the National Defense Commission also served as the supreme commander of the Korean People's Army. From 1972 until 1992, the President was the ex officio chairman of the National Defense Commission. Since 1992, the chairman of the National Defense Commission was no longer required to be the President and was elected by the Supreme People's Assembly.

The first vice chairman, the vice chairmen and the members of the National Defense Commission were elected by the Supreme People's Assembly based on the proposal of the President from 1972 until 1992, and by the chairman of the National Defense Commission from 1992 until 2012.

In 2012, the position of chairman of the National Defense Commission was replaced by the First Chairman of the National Defense Commission following an amendment to the 1972 Constitution that enshrined Kim Jong Il as eternal chairman of the National Defense Commission after his death in 2011. The same amendment also mandated that the National Defense Commission also consisted of vice chairmen and members, which were elected by the Supreme People's Assembly based on the proposal of the first chairman of the National Defense Commission.

Among the departments that are known in the NDC were:

- Administration Department
- Foreign Affairs Department
- Reconnaissance General Bureau
- Policy Department

Security agencies and organizations that subordinated to the Commission:

- Ministry of People's Armed Forces
- Ministry of People's Security
- Korean People's Army
- Ministry of State Security (North Korea)

== Members ==
The following are the members of the National Defense Commission at the time of its dissolution on 29 June 2016:

First Chairman of the National Defense Commission
First Chairman	Political party	Member since
Kim Jong Un 김정은 (Born 1984)	Workers' Party of Korea	11 April 2012
Vice Chairman of the National Defense Commission
Vice Chairman	Political party	Member since
Ri Yong-mu 리용무 (1925-2022)	Workers' Party of Korea	5 September 1998
O Kuk-ryol 오극렬 (1930-2023)	Workers' Party of Korea	19 February 2009
Hwang Pyong-so 황병서 (Born 1949)	Workers' Party of Korea	25 September 2014
Member of the National Defense Commission
Member	Political party	Member since
Kim Won-hong 김원홍 (born 1945)	Workers' Party of Korea	13 April 2012
Choe Pu-il 최부일 (Born 1944)	Workers' Party of Korea	9 April 2014
Jo Chun-ryong 조춘룡	Workers' Party of Korea	9 April 2014
Ri Pyong-chol 리병철 (Born 1948)	Workers' Party of Korea	25 September 2014
Kim Chun-sop 김춘섭	Workers' Party of Korea	9 April 2015

== See also ==
- Government of North Korea
- Military of North Korea
- National Defense Council of East Germany
- Central Military Commission of China
