= 1998 North Korean parliamentary election =

- 26 July 1998

All 687 seats in the Supreme People's Assembly
- Turnout: 99.85%
| Party | Seats | +/– |
|---|---|---|
| Workers' Party of Korea | 594 | −7 |
| Social Democratic Party | 53 | +2 |
| Chondoist Chongu Party | 23 | +1 |
This lists parties that won seats. See the complete results below.
| NDC Chairman before | Elected NDC Chairman |
|---|---|
| Kim Jong Il; Workers' Party | Kim Jong Il; Workers' Party |

Parliamentary elections were held in North Korea on 26 July 1998. 687 deputies were elected to the tenth Supreme People's Assembly. There was only one nominated candidate per constituency — 687 candidates for 687 seats. According to the state news agency KCNA, the turnout rate was 99.85%, and 100% of participating voters cast their ballots in favour of the registered candidates. About two thirds of the deputies were new, and deputies with a military background reportedly doubled in number. Kim Jong Il was unanimously elected in constituency n°666. According to an editorial published in Rodong Sinmun, the official newspaper of the Workers' Party of Korea, this proved "how deep the Korean people's trust in Kim Jong Il is and how powerful and solid the monolithic unity of the people around him in one thought and purpose and with moral obligation is."

The election was three years overdue, the latest election having been in 1990. The planned 1995 elections were cancelled due to a period of mourning instituted after the death of Kim Il Sung. In its first session on 5 September 1998, the newly elected parliament amended laws to reflect the succession of Kim Jong Il.

== Numerological significance of the number 666 in North Korean politics ==
Kim Jong Il's seat was the 666th seat, and in North Korea, political meanings are imparted to numbers of the constituencies for cult of personality purposes. Rodong Shinmun stated in its 1999 opinion piece "666: Legend of the Great Man" that the number is meaningful in the sense that the cube of 6 is 216, which coincides with Kim Jong Il's birthday, 16 February, and emphasizes that North Korea is the 6th state to exist in the Korean peninsula. (Note: North Korea acknowledges five states that are based in North Korea or claim to be a descendant of kingdoms based in North Korea, which are Gojoseon, Goguryeo, Balhae, Goryeo, and Joseon, as proper states, and downplay the role of ancient kingdoms based or started in South Korea such as Baekje, Silla or the Gaya confederacy. South Korea is treated as a puppet state from the North Korean point of view and thus not considered a state.)

== Results ==
| Party or alliance | | Votes | % | Seats |
|---|---|---|---|---|
| Fatherland Front | Workers' Party of Korea | | 100 | 594 |
| Fatherland Front | Korean Social Democratic Party | | 100 | 53 |
| Fatherland Front | Chondoist Chongu Party | | 100 | 23 |
| Fatherland Front | Chongryon | | 100 | 7 |
| Fatherland Front | Independents | | 100 | 10 |
| Total | | | | 687 |
| Registered voters/turnout | | | 99.85 | |
Source: Nohlen et al., IPU

=== Elected members ===
The following were elected as members of parliament:

1. Electoral District: Kim Bok-nam
2. Electoral District: Kim Yong-bok
3. Electoral District: Ryu Chung-ryol
4. Electoral District: Kang Jun-ho
5. Electoral District: Kim Ryong-yon
6. Electoral District: Ryu Mi-yong
7. Electoral District: Chu Chang-hui
8. Electoral District: Chon Chin-su
9. Electoral District: Chon Kwang-chun
10. Electoral District: Ri Sung-thaek
11. Electoral District: Jong Myong-ok
12. Electoral District: Ryang Man-kil
13. Electoral District: Im Man-sun
14. Electoral District: Ri Sun-im
15. Electoral District: Pak Yun-hwal
16. Electoral District: Yu Il-ung
17. Electoral District: Kim In-hwa
18. Electoral District: Kim Chong-ku
19. Electoral District: Hong Yong-kil
20. Electoral District: Song Chun-sik
21. Electoral District: Ham Song-to
22. Electoral District: Kim Kon-il
23. Electoral District: Ri Sung-hui
24. Electoral District: Kang Hyong-mo
25. Electoral District: Kim Song-hi
26. Electoral District: Ho Jong-suk
27. Electoral District: Chi Yong-chun
28. Electoral District: Kang Tok-su
29. Electoral District: Ri Hwa-sun
30. Electoral District: Ri Won-jae
31. Electoral District: Chu Jong-kyong
32. Electoral District: Ri Pyong-kap
33. Electoral District: Pak Jong-sun
34. Electoral District: Kim Pyong-bok
35. Electoral District: Kang Thae-mu
36. Electoral District: Kang Hyon-su
37. Electoral District: Chu Sun-ok
38. Electoral District: Kim Ki-u
39. Electoral District: Kim Chang-sik
40. Electoral District: Pak Kwan-o
41. Electoral District: Sim Thae-kyun
42. Electoral District: Pak Ki-so
43. Electoral District: Kim Hwa-suk
44. Electoral District: Kim Song-ung
45. Electoral District: Ri Hwa-sil
46. Electoral District: Kim Nung-sun
47. Electoral District: Kye Su-kun
48. Electoral District: Pak Yong-son
49. Electoral District: Hong So-hon
50. Electoral District: Cho Kyong-sun
51. Electoral District: Kim Jong
52. Electoral District: Ri Thae-il
53. Electoral District: Ok Pong-rin
54. Electoral District: Kim Bok-sil
55. Electoral District: Kwon Tong-hwa
56. Electoral District: Kim SIho
57. Electoral District: Thae Son-hui
58. Electoral District: Kim Se-myong
59. Electoral District: Ri Son-sil
60. Electoral District: Kim Ho-je
61. Electoral District: Ri Tan
62. Electoral District: Han Chang-ryol
63. Electoral District: Ryu Chun-ok
64. Electoral District: Ri Won-sik
65. Electoral District: Chon Ku-kang
66. Electoral District: Kim In-nam
67. Electoral District: Cho Yun-je
68. Electoral District: Han Jae-rok
69. Electoral District: Sim Myong-su
70. Electoral District: Kim Yong-chu
71. Electoral District: Kim Bo-pi
72. Electoral District: Kim Song-kwon
73. Electoral District: Kim Yu-il
74. Electoral District: Rim Nam-su
75. Electoral District: Kim Jong-suk
76. Electoral District: Kim Chang-in
77. Electoral District: Mun Sang-min
78. Electoral District: Choe Hong-il
79. Electoral District: Sin Tae-kyun
80. Electoral District: Choe Jun-kun
81. Electoral District: Kim Kuk-tae
82. Electoral District: Ri Kwang-ho
83. Electoral District: Chang Kum-tok
84. Electoral District: Kim Yang-kon
85. Electoral District: Tak Jong-suk
86. Electoral District: Hwang Sun-hui
87. Electoral District: Kim Yo-ung
88. Electoral District: Kim Ui-mo
89. Electoral District: Im Rok-jae
90. Electoral District: Kim Man-song
91. Electoral District: Kim Su-ik
92. Electoral District: Han Yong-hye
93. Electoral District: Kim Sang-ryong
94. Electoral District: Choe Kwan-jun
95. Electoral District: Paek In-jun
96. Electoral District: Ro Pong-ho
97. Electoral District: Ryom Hyon-so
98. Electoral District: Ri U-ho
99. Electoral District: Han Jong-hwa
100. Electoral District: Jong Tong-uk
101. Electoral District: Ro Ik-hwa
102. Electoral District: Ro Jong-hui
103. Electoral District: Choe Son-il
104. Electoral District: Choe Pun-hui
105. Electoral District: Mun Jae-chol
106. Electoral District: Kim Chang-chu
107. Electoral District: Jong Mun-san
108. Electoral District: Ri Chun-son
109. Electoral District: Kang Il-kwan
110. Electoral District: Han Kwang-bok
111. Electoral District: Kim Jung-rin
112. Electoral District: Choe Ryong-ik
113. Electoral District: Pyon Suk-yong
114. Electoral District: Kang Hyon-bok
115. Electoral District: Cho Bok-hui
116. Electoral District: Ro Myong-kun
117. Electoral District: Jang Song-thaek
118. Electoral District: Yu Pom-sun
119. Electoral District: Ri Mu-yong
120. Electoral District: Mun Su-ok
121. Electoral District: Ri Ung-won
122. Electoral District: Pak Sung-kwon
123. Electoral District: Rim Tong-ok
124. Electoral District: Choe Su-hon
125. Electoral District: Thae Hyong-chol
126. Electoral District: Pak Yong-hun
127. Electoral District: Yun Ung-su
128. Electoral District: Kim Kwang-yong
129. Electoral District: Chon Chong-ki
130. Electoral District: Pak To-chun
131. Electoral District: Kang Sok-chu
132. Electoral District: Pak Son-phil
133. Electoral District: An Myong-ok
134. Electoral District: Kim Hui-yong
135. Electoral District: Pak Yong-hun
136. Electoral District: Kim Ok-ryon
137. Electoral District: Chon Kwang-ryol
138. Electoral District: Kim Jong-sil
139. Electoral District: Ri Hwa-chu
140. Electoral District: O Myong-il
141. Electoral District: Kim Jong-hun
142. Electoral District: Hyon Ryo-chin
143. Electoral District: Hwang Se-pyong
144. Electoral District: Jong Pyong-hak
145. Electoral District: Ri Hi-il
146. Electoral District: Pak Song-chol
147. Electoral District: So Pyong-bok
148. Electoral District: Sin Won-il
149. Electoral District: Kim Ryong-thaek
150. Electoral District: Kang Yong-thae
151. Electoral District: Ri Kil-song
152. Electoral District: Chon Jae-rok
153. Electoral District: Song In-kil
154. Electoral District: Ri Chun-ku
155. Electoral District: Hong Song-nam
156. Electoral District: Kim Chol-won
157. Electoral District: Pang CHONGsu
158. Electoral District: Cho Yong-hui
159. Electoral District: Kim Myong-il
160. Electoral District: Mun Jong-nam
161. Electoral District: Song Hyon
162. Electoral District: Ri Won-il
163. Electoral District: Ri Kum-pom
164. Electoral District: Cho Hui-yol
165. Electoral District: Won Jong-sam
166. Electoral District: Ra Yong-ran
167. Electoral District: Song Thae-yon
168. Electoral District: Kim Sok-hyon
169. Electoral District: Kim Jong-kil
170. Electoral District: Ri Chin-kyu
171. Electoral District: Ryu Jae-myong
172. Electoral District: Kim Sang-ok
173. Electoral District: Pak Pong-chu
174. Electoral District: Kwon Hyon-suk
175. Electoral District: Kim Jae-hwa
176. Electoral District: Han Kwang-bok
177. Electoral District: Paek Hak-rim
178. Electoral District: Kwak Pom-ki
179. Electoral District: Ri Pong-ik
180. Electoral District: Son SIwon
181. Electoral District: Kim Hui-sam
182. Electoral District: Kim Yong-sun
183. Electoral District: Ri Son-sam
184. Electoral District: Kim Kyong-su
185. Electoral District: Choe Yong-tok
186. Electoral District: Om Kil-son
187. Electoral District: Choe Song-won
188. Electoral District: An Chang-ryon
189. Electoral District: Cho Chang-tok
190. Electoral District: Jong Tae-ik
191. Electoral District: Kim Pyong-hwa
192. Electoral District: Kim Yong-il
193. Electoral District: Cho Kang-chol
194. Electoral District: Cho Jong-rim
195. Electoral District: Chu Kyu-chang
196. Electoral District: Kim Jong-un
197. Electoral District: Chang Jae-chol
198. Electoral District: Kim Pong-mo
199. Electoral District: Choe Chun-sil
200. Electoral District: Won Su-bok
201. Electoral District: Hong Wan-thae
202. Electoral District: Kang Tong-yun
203. Electoral District: Choe Hu-yong
204. Electoral District: Chon Kyong-son
205. Electoral District: Choe Sun-ik
206. Electoral District: Tak Pyong-kil
207. Electoral District: Pyon Tok-sang
208. Electoral District: Pae Tal-jun
209. Electoral District: Ri Yong
210. Electoral District: Kim Yong-ryeob
211. Electoral District: Han Pong-un
212. Electoral District: Kang Tung-cha
213. Electoral District: Kim Yun-hyok
214. Electoral District: Jong Yong-kap
215. Electoral District: Chon Yon-ok
216. Electoral District: Kim Phyong-hae
217. Electoral District: Ri Sang-ryong
218. Electoral District: Ri Jong-hyok
219. Electoral District: Won Tong-ku
220. Electoral District: Han Kuk-sung
221. Electoral District: Nam Si-u
222. Electoral District: Chang Chang-mun
223. Electoral District: Yun Tong-hyon
224. Electoral District: Kim Hui-son
225. Electoral District: So Chun-yong
226. Electoral District: Pak Mun-sik
227. Electoral District: Pak Song-chun
228. Electoral District: Ri Song-ung
229. Electoral District: Kim Pyong-hun
230. Electoral District: Ri Won-chol
231. Electoral District: Kim Son-tan
232. Electoral District: Pak Hwa-chun
233. Electoral District: Choe Hak-kun
234. Electoral District: Son Un-song
235. Electoral District: Pak Song-sil
236. Electoral District: Hyon Won-kuk
237. Electoral District: Cha Myong-ok
238. Electoral District: Sin Thae-uk
239. Electoral District: Chang Yun-son
240. Electoral District: Mun Pyong-kum
241. Electoral District: An Yong-hyon
242. Electoral District: Yang Hyong-sob
243. Electoral District: Ri Je-son
244. Electoral District: Paek Yong-il
245. Electoral District: Kim Tae-sun
246. Electoral District: Kim Song-hun
247. Electoral District: Ri Jung-sob
248. Electoral District: Pang Chol-sun
249. Electoral District: Chang Jong-nam
250. Electoral District: Cho Yun-hui
251. Electoral District: Han Song-kyu
252. Electoral District: Jong Chun-sil
253. Electoral District: Pak Chang-il
254. Electoral District: Chon Pyong-ho
255. Electoral District: Sin Kwan-chin
256. Electoral District: Ryom Hui-ryong
257. Electoral District: Pyon Ryong-se
258. Electoral District: Kim Chang-su
259. Electoral District: Jong-ho
260. Electoral District: Pak Son-ho
261. Electoral District: Ho Song-chun
262. Electoral District: Kim Il-sun
263. Electoral District: Yon Hyong-muk
264. Electoral District: Ri To-won
265. Electoral District: Kang Won-jung
266. Electoral District: Pak Myong-son
267. Electoral District: Ri Tuk-nam
268. Electoral District: Kim Chol-man
269. Electoral District: Ro Hae-sun
270. Electoral District: Pyon Thae-jun
271. Electoral District: Kim In-suk
272. Electoral District: Chang Se-jun
273. Electoral District: Han Won-hwa
274. Electoral District: Kim Chae-ran
275. Electoral District: Choe Yong-il
276. Electoral District: Kim Tong-son
277. Electoral District: Kim Sun-yong
278. Electoral District: Pak Song-ok
279. Electoral District: Kang Hye-suk
280. Electoral District: Kang Kwan-chu
281. Electoral District: Ryu Sun-ae
282. Electoral District: Pak Yong-hum
283. Electoral District: Ri Yong-son
284. Electoral District: Chi Sang-man
285. Electoral District: Kim Yong-ok
286. Electoral District: Kang Jong-pong
287. Electoral District: Ho Nam-sun
288. Electoral District: Kim Ki-nam
289. Electoral District: Kim Chun-nyo
290. Electoral District: Ri Pyong-uk
291. Electoral District: Hwang Sun-hui
292. Electoral District: Paek Chang-ryong
293. Electoral District: Ri Song-yong
294. Electoral District: Ri Kwang-hwi
295. Electoral District: Chon Mun-sob
296. Electoral District: Paek Nam-il
297. Electoral District: Ri Song-kil
298. Electoral District: Ri In-kyu
299. Electoral District: Kim Ki-hwan
300. Electoral District: Choe Chil-nam
301. Electoral District: Won Chang-ryong
302. Electoral District: Sin Won-kyu
303. Electoral District: Kim Il-chan
304. Electoral District: Jong Yon-hwa
305. Electoral District: Han Si-hae
306. Electoral District: Choe Hung-chu
307. Electoral District: Jong Pong-hwa
308. Electoral District: Jong Ok-tong
309. Electoral District: Chi Jae-ryong
310. Electoral District: Pak Thae-ho
311. Electoral District: Ryang Su-jong
312. Electoral District: An Kyong-ho
313. Electoral District: Han Phil-hwa
314. Electoral District: Han Cho-ung
315. Electoral District: An Min-chol
316. Electoral District: Choe Yol-hui
317. Electoral District: Kim Pong-su
318. Electoral District: Min Ung-sik
319. Electoral District: Yun Ki-bok
320. Electoral District: Choe Jong-kon
321. Electoral District: Ko Jong-myong
322. Electoral District: Kim Pyong-hwan
323. Electoral District: Kim Un-ki
324. Electoral District: Hwang Hwi-sang
325. Electoral District: Choe Kwang-tok
326. Electoral District: Ri Ha-sob
327. Electoral District: Kim Bo-kyong
328. Electoral District: Sung Sang-sob
329. Electoral District: Ri Hyon-son
330. Electoral District: Min Jong-sik
331. Electoral District: Ri Jong-ok
332. Electoral District: Ri Sun-ae
333. Electoral District: Kye Yong-sam
334. Electoral District: Ri Tok-jung
335. Electoral District: Kim Yok-kyu
336. Electoral District: Cho Tong-hwi
337. Electoral District: Kim Sung-ok
338. Electoral District: Kim Sang-ryon
339. Electoral District: Ryang Kyong-bok
340. Electoral District: Pak Thae-chin
341. Electoral District: Paek Sol
342. Electoral District: Kang Myong-ok
343. Electoral District: Chang Myong-sil
344. Electoral District: Kim Yong-nam
345. Electoral District: Kim Thae-hong
346. Electoral District: Cho Hye-suk
347. Electoral District: Kang Yong-ho
348. Electoral District: Kim Il-chol
349. Electoral District: Kim Chin-hwa
350. Electoral District: Ri In-ho
351. Electoral District: Ro Pae-kwon
352. Electoral District: Kim Jong-rok
353. Electoral District: Ko Kyu-il
354. Electoral District: Song Hyo-tal
355. Electoral District: Choe Yong-kil
356. Electoral District: O Kuk-ryol
357. Electoral District: Hong Sok-hyong
358. Electoral District: Sin Hyong-chin
359. Electoral District: Ri Sang-chon
360. Electoral District: Kim Yong-ae
361. Electoral District: Ri Song-tae
362. Electoral District: Kim Tok-jung
363. Electoral District: Yun Chol
364. Electoral District: Kim Pyong-song
365. Electoral District: Kim Jong-ok
366. Electoral District: Nam Sang-rak
367. Electoral District: Ko Song-kun
368. Electoral District: Pak Nam-gi
369. Electoral District: Ri Yun-ryeob
370. Electoral District: Choe Yong-song
371. Electoral District: Song Son-pi
372. Electoral District: Han Song-ryong
373. Electoral District: Chu Ki-chan
374. Electoral District: Ri Kwang-u
375. Electoral District: Jong Song-thaek
376. Electoral District: Chi Ok-sun
377. Electoral District: Ri Thae-son
378. Electoral District: Kim Kwang
379. Electoral District: So Hyong-nam
380. Electoral District: So Man-sul
381. Electoral District: Ko Jong-ok
382. Electoral District: Ri Kyong-sik
383. Electoral District: Pak Myong-chol
384. Electoral District: Pak Chang-yong
385. Electoral District: Pong Chan-ho
386. Electoral District: Pak Pom-rak
387. Electoral District: Hong Sok-chin
388. Electoral District: Hwang Jae-kyong
389. Electoral District: O Myun-kun
390. Electoral District: Han Tok-su
391. Electoral District: Han Won-il
392. Electoral District: Kwon Sun-ok
393. Electoral District: Choe Hyong-kwan
394. Electoral District: Han Hung-nam
395. Electoral District: Kim Chin-kyu
396. Electoral District: Kim Pyong-sik
397. Electoral District: U Tu-thae
398. Electoral District: Kim Tal-to
399. Electoral District: Sok Kyong-su
400. Electoral District: Ri Kum-sun
401. Electoral District: Chae Hui-jong
402. Electoral District: Choe Su-il
403. Electoral District: Hwang Jong-hun
404. Electoral District: Ri Chun-hwa
405. Electoral District: Hong Jong-ku
406. Electoral District: Yun Chol-ho
407. Electoral District: Ri Myong-chol
408. Electoral District: Jong Pyong-sang
409. Electoral District: Cho Myong-rok
410. Electoral District: Hwang Jong-un
411. Electoral District: Kang Chol-ung
412. Electoral District: Ko Jong-tok
413. Electoral District: Ri Hyok-chol
414. Electoral District: Chon Jae-son
415. Electoral District: Kim Won-kyun
416. Electoral District: Pak Yun-tuk
417. Electoral District: Choe Myong-ae
418. Electoral District: Im Chang-sun
419. Electoral District: Ri Jong-mu
420. Electoral District: Ho Yong-pom
421. Electoral District: Choe Won-ik
422. Electoral District: Kim Tok-yong
423. Electoral District: Kim Hong-su
424. Electoral District: Jong Ha-chol
425. Electoral District: Kwon I-sun
426. Electoral District: Pak Chong-il
427. Electoral District: Kim Yong-ung
428. Electoral District: Yom Ki-sun
429. Electoral District: Pak Sam-ho
430. Electoral District: Kim Je-tong
431. Electoral District: Jong Mun-su
432. Electoral District: Choe Wang-tae
433. Electoral District: Ri Ui-hyon
434. Electoral District: Chon Jong-sik
435. Electoral District: Kim Su-hak
436. Electoral District: Chon Hye-song
437. Electoral District: Kwon Jong-hyob
438. Electoral District: Kim Kwang-sob
439. Electoral District: Chu Chang-jun
440. Electoral District: Ko Son-ok
441. Electoral District: An Sang-thaek
442. Electoral District: Jong Tong-kun
443. Electoral District: Son Ha-sik
444. Electoral District: Paek Nam-jun
445. Electoral District: An Pyong-mu
446. Electoral District: Kim Bok-sin
447. Electoral District: Choe Ki-ryong
448. Electoral District: Ryo Won-ku
449. Electoral District: Kim Bok-ryul
450. Electoral District: Ri Won-su
451. Electoral District: Kim Jong-sob
452. Electoral District: Ri Thae-yon
453. Electoral District: Ri Hong-sob
454. Electoral District: Kim Pyong-ryul
455. Electoral District: Kim Hwa-wol
456. Electoral District: Choe Yong-kon
457. Electoral District: Choe Chang-hak
458. Electoral District: Kwon Sang-ho
459. Electoral District: Rim Ki-yon
460. Electoral District: Kim Yang-kun
461. Electoral District: Sin An-son
462. Electoral District: Cho Pyong-chu
463. Electoral District: Han Jae-uk
464. Electoral District: Ri Hyo-son
465. Electoral District: Ri Kyong-sob
466. Electoral District: Chang Myong-hak
467. Electoral District: Jong Pyong-kon
468. Electoral District: Ri Ki-sob
469. Electoral District: Cho Tae-hi
470. Electoral District: Jong Hui-chol
471. Electoral District: Sin Song-u
472. Electoral District: Hong Yong-ok
473. Electoral District: Ri Pyong-chol
474. Electoral District: Ri Chol-pong
475. Electoral District: Ri Il-hwan
476. Electoral District: Ho Jong-man
477. Electoral District: Han Jong-kil
478. Electoral District: Mun Yong-son
479. Electoral District: Ri Chu-ung
480. Electoral District: Kim Won-hong
481. Electoral District: Ri Chang-hwa
482. Electoral District: Ri Yong-ae
483. Electoral District: Kim Sung-nam
484. Electoral District: Han Tu-hyon
485. Electoral District: Mun Kyong-tok
486. Electoral District: Ryom Chol
487. Electoral District: Han Tong-wan
488. Electoral District: Chon Myong-hui
489. Electoral District: Hong Tuk-ryong
490. Electoral District: Kim Thae-ok
491. Electoral District: Ri Mun-hwan
492. Electoral District: Pak Ui-chun
493. Electoral District: Kim Sang-pu
494. Electoral District: Ri Yong-suk
495. Electoral District: O Ki-sok
496. Electoral District: Kim Yong-dae
497. Electoral District: Han Chi-sol
498. Electoral District: Kang Ryon-hak
499. Electoral District: Ri Jong-san
500. Electoral District: Choe Kwan-ung
501. Electoral District: Cha Yong-phyo
502. Electoral District: Ro Tu-chol
503. Electoral District: Chang Sun-kum
504. Electoral District: Kim Pung-ki
505. Electoral District: Choe Thae-bok
506. Electoral District: Kim Song-hun
507. Electoral District: Pang Song-su
508. Electoral District: Kang Yong-sob
509. Electoral District: Ryom Sun-kil
510. Electoral District: Choe Ung-su
511. Electoral District: Chon Sung-hun
512. Electoral District: Kim Pong-sik
513. Electoral District: Ri Ha-il
514. Electoral District: An Nong-sik
515. Electoral District: Pak Yong-sok
516. Electoral District: Sok Chol-u
517. Electoral District: Ri Yong-ku
518. Electoral District: Chang Son-ok
519. Electoral District: Nam Song-rok
520. Electoral District: Hwang Ok-son
521. Electoral District: Pak Yong-il
522. Electoral District: Kim Chang-kyu
523. Electoral District: Cha Sung-su
524. Electoral District: Yun Ki-jong
525. Electoral District: Sin Tong-son
526. Electoral District: Pak Yong-thae
527. Electoral District: Jong Chong-sik
528. Electoral District: Chon Kwang-rok
529. Electoral District: Cho Se-ung
530. Electoral District: Sin Yon-ok
531. Electoral District: Cho Jong-ung
532. Electoral District: Choe Kwan-jun
533. Electoral District: Ri Jong-sik
534. Electoral District: Tong Hun
535. Electoral District: Kim Chun-kum
536. Electoral District: Choe Yong-rim
537. Electoral District: Chu Chun-sob
538. Electoral District: Kim Hyong-chan
539. Electoral District: Pak Min-chol
540. Electoral District: Kim Pong-se
541. Electoral District: Ko Ki-hun
542. Electoral District: Nam Hui-jun
543. Electoral District: Kim Min-suk
544. Electoral District: Pak Chun-man
545. Electoral District: Kim Jong-on
546. Electoral District: Ri Jong-sik
547. Electoral District: Ryo Kon-yo
548. Electoral District: Song Kum-ok
549. Electoral District: Kim Won-bok
550. Electoral District: Kim Thae-pong
551. Electoral District: Pak Su-kil
552. Electoral District: Ko Hak-chin
553. Electoral District: Phyo Il-sok
554. Electoral District: Choe Hui-jong
555. Electoral District: Ri Sang-chol
556. Electoral District: Kim Kyong-hui
557. Electoral District: Kim Song-ok
558. Electoral District: Ri Su-bok
559. Electoral District: Ri Sang-mu
560. Electoral District: Ri Yong-mu
561. Electoral District: Cha Sang-kwon
562. Electoral District: Ri Won-ho
563. Electoral District: Ri Jong-pom
564. Electoral District: Sok Kil-ho
565. Electoral District: Kim Jae-hwan
566. Electoral District: Ri Kun-mo
567. Electoral District: Ri Min-jong
568. Electoral District: Kim Tong-kyun
569. Electoral District: Kim Tong-han
570. Electoral District: Ri Chang-won
571. Electoral District: Kim Su-yol
572. Electoral District: An Sam-chom
573. Electoral District: Pak Chang-sik
574. Electoral District: Pak Chol-ho
575. Electoral District: Ri Yong-u
576. Electoral District: Ri Tae-won
577. Electoral District: Kang Sok-sung
578. Electoral District: Mun Il-pong
579. Electoral District: O I-jong
580. Electoral District: Kim Myong-hui
581. Electoral District: Ri Ki-hwa
582. Electoral District: Ri Kong-phil
583. Electoral District: Ri Ul-sol
584. Electoral District: Chang In-suk
585. Electoral District: Pak Kun-su
586. Electoral District: Ri Il-nam
587. Electoral District: Sim Sang-hu
588. Electoral District: Rim Juk-son
589. Electoral District: Kong Chin-thae
590. Electoral District: Ri Su-kil
591. Electoral District: Kim Yong-hyok
592. Electoral District: Song Jong-su
593. Electoral District: Ri Hyon-sob
594. Electoral District: Kim Yong-sun
595. Electoral District: Kim SIhak
596. Electoral District: Kim Chan-bok
597. Electoral District: Pak Kyong-suk
598. Electoral District: Kim Il-san
599. Electoral District: Kim Tae-kyom
600. Electoral District: Kim Ik-hyon
601. Electoral District: Kim Chang-hwan
602. Electoral District: Kim Yong-chun
603. Electoral District: Kim Hyo-kwan
604. Electoral District: Choe In-tok
605. Electoral District: Kim Kwang-ok
606. Electoral District: Ri Yong-bok
607. Electoral District: Pak Yong-ha
608. Electoral District: Kim Yong-il
609. Electoral District: Kim Yong-bok
610. Electoral District: Pang Yong-tok
611. Electoral District: Im Chun-sik
612. Electoral District: Jong Myong-to
613. Electoral District: O Se-in
614. Electoral District: Kim Su-tok
615. Electoral District: Ri Sung-hun
616. Electoral District: Ko Myong-hui
617. Electoral District: Jong Tu-chan
618. Electoral District: Chang Chol
619. Electoral District: Kye Ung-thae
620. Electoral District: Kim Pyong-tok
621. Electoral District: Ri Hye-chol
622. Electoral District: Ri Ok-sang
623. Electoral District: Kang Chol-su
624. Electoral District: Mun Ung-cho
625. Electoral District: Im Jong-sil
626. Electoral District: Rim Ki-hwan
627. Electoral District: Kang Phyo-yong
628. Electoral District: Hyon Chol-hae
629. Electoral District: Paek Sang-ho
630. Electoral District: Chon Ki-ryon
631. Electoral District: Tak Kum-chol
632. Electoral District: Won Ung-hui
633. Electoral District: Kim Kyok-sik
634. Electoral District: Kim Yong-hui
635. Electoral District: Chang Song-u
636. Electoral District: Pak Jong-sik
637. Electoral District: Chu Sang-song
638. Electoral District: Kim Jong-kak
639. Electoral District: Ryo Chun-sok
640. Electoral District: Kim Song-kyu
641. Electoral District: Pak Jae-kyong
642. Electoral District: Ri Pong-juk
643. Electoral District: Ri Yong-hwan
644. Electoral District: Chon Chae-kwon
645. Electoral District: Jong Hyo-kyun
646. Electoral District: Ri Myong-su
647. Electoral District: Pak Sung-won
648. Electoral District: Kim Ryong-un
649. Electoral District: Pak Song-ho
650. Electoral District: O Kum-chol
651. Electoral District: Kim Ki-son
652. Electoral District: Sin Kum-yon
653. Electoral District: Ri Phil-ryol
654. Electoral District: Kim Yun-sim
655. Electoral District: Jong Chang-ryol
656. Electoral District: Kim Yong-nam
657. Electoral District: Ri Thae-chol
658. Electoral District: Choe Sang-ryo
659. Electoral District: Ko Wan-myong
660. Electoral District: Ri Jong-pu
661. Electoral District: Kim Myong-kuk
662. Electoral District: Ri Jong-man
663. Electoral District: Kim Hyong-ryong
664. Electoral District: Ri Hyong-ryong
665. Electoral District: Kim Yang-chom
666. Electoral District: Kim Jong Il
667. Electoral District: Ri Yong-kil
668. Electoral District: Choe Pu-il
669. Electoral District: An Pi-tuk
670. Electoral District: Kim Yong-chol
671. Electoral District: Kim Ha-kyu
672. Electoral District: O Ryong-pang
673. Electoral District: Ri Pyong-sam
674. Electoral District: Yun Yong-kil
675. Electoral District: Choe Song-su
676. Electoral District: Pak Yong-kon
677. Electoral District: Kim Chang-song
678. Electoral District: Han Pae-nyon
679. Electoral District: Ri Jae-yon
680. Electoral District: Cho Myong-chol
681. Electoral District: Pae Tok-hwan
682. Electoral District: Chae Mun-tok
683. Electoral District: Ri Yong-chol
684. Electoral District: Kim Chi-tok
685. Electoral District: Kim Jong-nam
686. Electoral District: Ri Un-ryong
687. Electoral District: Pak In-yong (박인영)
