= Death and state funeral of Kim Il Sung =

1994 death of North Korean leader

- Date: 8–17 July 1994
- Location: Pyongyang, North Korea
- Participants: Kim Jong Il and North Korean military, government and Korean Workers' Party elites

Kim Il Sung, founder and supreme leader of North Korea, died of a heart attack in the early morning of 8 July 1994 at age 82. North Korea's government did not report the death for more than 34 hours after it occurred. An official mourning period was declared from 8–17 July, during which the national flag was flown at half mast throughout the country, and all forms of amusement and dancing were prohibited.

Radio Pyongyang reported that Kim had died from a heart attack. His son Kim Jong Il was announced as North Korea's next leader with the title of "The Great Successor" (Korean: 위대한 계승자) that same day, marking the beginning of a dynasty of rulers in the country. Seventeen years later, he died on 17 December 2011 of the same cause of death as his father and the younger Kim's demise was announced 51 hours later.

== Background ==
On the late morning just before 12:00 noon of 7 July 1994, Kim Il Sung collapsed at his residence in Hyangsan from a sudden heart attack. His son Kim Jong Il ordered the team of doctors who were constantly at his father's side to leave, and arranged for the country's best doctors to be flown in from Pyongyang. After several hours, the doctors from Pyongyang arrived, but despite their efforts to save him, Kim Il Sung died at around 2:00 am local time on 8 July 1994. His death was declared 34 hours later.

The announcement of the death of the supreme leader was made live over Korean Central Television at noon by the channel's news presenter Chon Hyong-kyu on 9 July 1994.

Kim Il Sung's death resulted in nationwide mourning and a ten-day mourning period was declared by Kim Jong Il. His funeral in Pyongyang was attended by hundreds of thousands of people from all over North Korea. Kim Il Sung's body was placed in a public mausoleum at the Kumsusan Memorial Palace, where his preserved and embalmed body lies under a glass coffin for viewing purposes. His head rests on a Korean-style pillow and he is covered by the flag of the Workers' Party of Korea. Newsreel video of the funeral at Pyongyang was broadcast on several networks, and subsequently made available on various websites. A further mourning period lasted until the third anniversary of his death in 1997.

== Reactions ==
=== Korean Peninsula ===
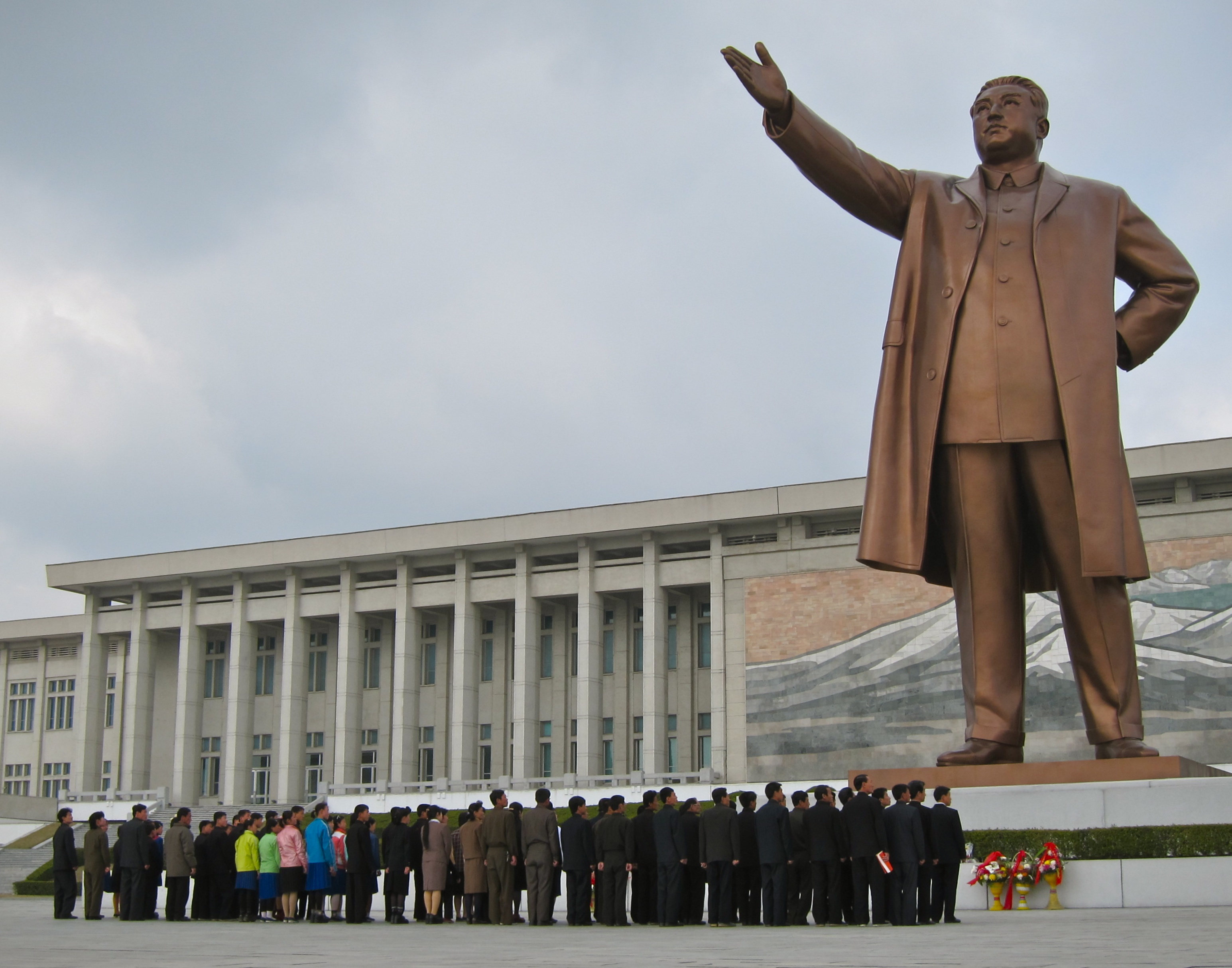
The original Statue of Kim Il Sung on Mansudae Hill (1972–2012)

- North Korea – On 9 July, Korean Central News Agency said that North Koreans "firmly resolve to remain loyal to the guidance of the Dear Leader Kim Jong Il". The agency described the so-called Dear Leader as "the reliable heir of Great Leader Kim Il Sung's revolutionary accomplishments". In another broadcast, Kim was described as the "inheritor of North Korea's revolution and the chief of revolutionary forces". On 11 July Japanese public television NHK said that North Korea's government completely blocked people and vehicles from passing through Tumen City, situated at the foot of the Tumen River, on the China–North Korea border, where border trade is actively taking place.
- South Korea – President Kim Young-sam put South Korean troops on high alert and shelved a planned Inter-Korean summit scheduled on 25 July.

=== International reactions ===
- China – Chinese leader Deng Xiaoping sent his condolences to North Korea, calling him “a close comrade-in-arms”.
- Russia – President Boris Yeltsin did not send condolences due to the two nations' strained relations at that period, instead delegating the duty to the then-Prime Minister Viktor Chernomyrdin.
- United States – President Bill Clinton expressed his hope that the talks "will continue as appropriate". Clinton said: "I extend sincere condolences to the people of North Korea on the death of President Kim Il Sung. We appreciate his leadership in resuming the talks between our governments."

== Funeral service ==
External videos
- KCTV: Kim Il Sung funeral on 8 July 1994 – full video on YouTube

Kim Jong Il was chairman of the funeral committee. The committee also included Defense Minister O Jin-u, and Vice President Kim Yong Ju, who was Kim Il Sung's younger brother.

The funeral committee released communique regarding the funeral:

The state Funeral Committee publishes the following decision for the whole party, all the people and the entire army to express the deepest condolences over the death of the great leader Comrade Kim Il Sung and mourn him with the feelings of deep reverence:

The coffin of the respected leader Comrade Kim Il Sung will be laid in state at the Kumsusan Assembly Hall.

The period from 8th July to 17th July 1994, is set as the mourning period for the respected leader Comrade Kim Il Sung. The mourners will visit the bier from 11th July to 16th July 1994

The mourning service for the last parting with the respected leader Comrade Kim Il Sung will be held solemnly in Pyongyang, the capital of revolution, on 17th July 1994.

At the time of the mourning service in Pyongyang, artillery salute will be fired in Pyongyang and provincial seats and the entire people across the country will observe a three-minute silence and all locomotives and ships sound whistles all at once in memory of the respected leader Comrade Kim Il Sung.

During the mourning period, memorial services will be held at all the organs and enterprises throughout the country and memorial services be held in all provinces, cities and counties while the memorial service is held in Pyongyang.

During the mourning period, organs and enterprises will hang the flag at half-mast, and all songs and dances, games and amusement will be banned.

Foreign mourning delegations will not be received.

— Korean Central News Agency, 8 July 1994

The state funeral was scheduled to be held on 17 July but was delayed until 19 July. It included the observance of three minutes of silence throughout the country. Attendance to the funeral was two million people.

== Funeral committee ==
The funeral committee was chaired by Kim Jong Il and had 273 members, including:

- Kim Jong Il
- O Jin-u
- Kang Song-san
- Ri Jong-ok
- Pak Song-chol
- Kim Yong-ju
- Kim Pyong-sik
- Kim Yong-nam
- Choe Kwang
- Kye Ung-thae
- Jon Pyong-ho
- Han Song-ryong
- So Yun-sok
- Kim Chang-man
- Choe Thae-bok
- Choe Yong-rim
- Hong Song-nam
- Kang Hui-won
- Yang Hyong-sop
- Hong Sok-hyong
- Yon Hyong-muk
- Ri Son-il
- Kim Chol-su
- Kim Ki-nam
- Kim Kuk-thae
- Hwang Jang-yop
- Kim Pok-sin
- Kim Chang-ju
- Kim Yun-hyok
- Jang Chol
- Kong Jin-tae
- Yun Ki-bok
- Pak Nam-gi
- Jon Mun-sop
- Yu Mi-yong
- Hyon Jun-kuk
- Won Tong-ku
- Ri Ha-il
- Kim Ik-hyon
- Ri Chang-son
- O Kuk-ryol
- Kwon Hui-kyong
- Kang Sok-sung
- Choe Hui-jong
- No Myong-kwon
- Jong Ha-chol
- Kim Tu-nam
- Paek Hak-rim
- Chi Chang-ik
- Ri Yong-u
- Ri Chi-chang
- Choe Pok-hyon
- Kim Chang-o
- Ri Sok-paek
- Pak Yong-sop
- Ri Chol-pong
- Jong Jun-ki
- Hwang Sun-hui
- Sin Sang-kyun
- Jong Ha-chol
- Kim Ki-ryong
- Kang Hyon-su
- Pak Sung-kil
- Kim Hak-chol
- Paek Pom-su
- Choe Mun-son
- Im Hyong-ku
- Ri Kun-mo
- Hyon Chol-kyu
- Ri Kil-song
- Im Su-man
- Ri Ul-sol
- Kim Pong-ryul
- Kim Kwang-sin
- Kim Jong-gak
- O Ryong-pang
- Kim Myong-kuk
- O Yun-hwi
- Kim Pyok-sik
- Jang Song-u
- Jon Jin-su
- Chu Sang-jong
- Kim Yong-chul
- Cho Myong-rok
- Kim Il-chol
- Paek Chang-sik
- Kim Yong-hun
- Kang Tong-yun
- Pak Chi-su
- Han In-chol
- Kim Ha-kyu
- Nam Sang-nak
- Hyon Chol-hae
- Ri Pong-won
- Kim Pyong-yul
- Chu Song-il
- Choe Yong-hae
- Choe Song-suk
- Kim Song-ae
- Paek In-jun
- Ri Mong-ho
- Mun Song-sul
- Yom Ki-sun
- Ri Yong-chol
- Jang Song-paek
- Kim Si-hak

== See also ==
- Death and state funeral of Kim Jong Il
- Kim Il Sung bibliography
- List of largest funerals
- List of things named after Kim Il Sung
