= Choe Kwang =

North Korean politician (1918–1997)

- 최광

Vice Chairman of the National Defence Commission
- In office 1990–1997
- Leader: Kim Il Sung; Kim Jong Il

Member of the Central Military Commission of the Workers' Party of Korea
- In office 1988–1997
- Leader: Kim Il Sung; Kim Jong Il

Minister of People's Armed Forces
- In office 1995–1997
- Leader: Kim Jong Il
- Preceded by: O Jin-u
- Succeeded by: Kim Il-chol

Chief of the General Staff of the Korean People's Army
- In office 1962–1968
- Leader: Kim Il Sung
- Preceded by: Kim Chang-bong
- Succeeded by: O Jin-u
- In office February 1988 – October 1995
- Preceded by: O Kuk-ryol
- Succeeded by: Kim Yong-chun

Personal details
- Born: July 17, 1918 Kankyōhoku Province (North Hamgyong Province), Korea, Empire of Japan
- Died: February 21, 1997 (aged 78) Pyongyang, North Korea

Military service
- Allegiance: North Korea
- Branch/service: Korean People's Army
- Rank: Marshal of the Korean People's Army
- Commands: 1st Infantry Division
- Battles/wars: See battles Korean independence movement Korean War: Battle of Gorangpo; Battle of Kaesong–Munsan; Battle of Bongilcheon; Battle of Siheung-Anyang-Suwon; Battle of Chungju-Suanbo; Battle of Ihwaryeong-Mungyeong; Battle of Sangju (1950); Battle of Hamchang

Marshal Choe Kwang (Korean: 최광; Hanja: 崔光; July 17, 1918 – February 21, 1997) was a military leader in North Korea.

== Biography ==
Kwang graduated from the Soviet Military School and was a captain in the Northeast Anti-Japanese Army until the end of the Japanese occupation. In February 1948, he took office as the 1st Division Commander of the Korean People's Army. In September 1948, he was elected to the Supreme People's Assembly. In June 1950, the 13th Division Commander of the Chosun People's Army and in October 1952, Kang Kun-Gun School (currently Kang-Gun General School) was inaugurated. In October 1953, he became the commander of the 5th Corps of the Chosun People's Army, and in January 1954, he was promoted to Lieutenant General of the Chosun People's Army and became the Chief of Staff of the 1st Corps.

In April 1956, he was elected as a candidate for the Central Committee of the Party at the 3rd Party Congress of the Workers' Party of Korea. In June 1958, he became the commander of the Air Force, and in June 1960, he was promoted to the Korean People's Army. In September 1961, he was elected as the central member of the party at the 4th Party Congress. In September 1962 he became vice of the National Security Agency (Abolished in 1972 and reorganized into the Ministry of People's Armed Forces). In February 1963, he was promoted to Captain of the Korean People's Army and became the Chief of General of Staff. On October 2, 1966, he was elected as a candidate for the Political Committee of the Party at the 2nd Party Delegates' Meeting, and in December 1967 he was elected to the Standing Committee of the Supreme People's Assembly. However, in March 1969, he was dismissed and became a mining worker.

In April 1976, he was reinstated while taking office as chairman of the People's Committee of the South Hwanghae Province. At the 6th Party Congress in October 1980, he was elected to the Central Committee of the WPK and the candidate member of the Political Bureau. In March 1981, he became Deputy Prime Minister Jung Moo-won. In April 1982, Jung Moo-won was inaugurated as Deputy Prime Minister and Chairman of the Fisheries Committee. On February 12, 1988, he withdrew from the deputy prime minister and transferred to the military. He was inaugurated as the Chief of the General Staff of the Korean People's Army and a member of the Central Military Commission of the Workers' Party of Korea.

On May 23, 1990, he was elected a member of the Party's Political Bureau at the 18th Plenary Session of the 6th Party Central Committee, and took office as vice-president of the National Defence Commission . In 1991, he was elected as a member of the Party's Central Military Committee, and on April 20, 1992, he was granted the title of Deputy General of the Korean People's Army. On October 8, 1995, he was appointed Minister of the People's Armed Forces. and was awarded the rank of Marshal of the Korean People's Army.

He was one of three military officers in the North Korean Armed Forces who reached rank of Wonsu (Marshal) with the title "Marshal of the Korean People's Army".

== Death and funeral ==
Choe died of a heart attack on February 21, 1997. On his funeral committee were:

1. Kim Jong Il
2. Ri Jong-ok
3. Pak Song-chol
4. Kim Yong-ju
5. Kim Yong-nam
6. Ri Ul-sol
7. Jo Myong-rok
8. Kim Yong-chun
9. Kye Ung-thae
10. Chon Pyong-ho
11. Han Song-ryong
12. Kim Chol-man
13. Choe Thae-bok
14. Yang Hyong-sop
15. Chon Un-sop
16. Hong Song-nam
17. Hong Sok-hyong
18. Kim Kuk-thae
19. Kim Ki-nam
20. Kim Jung-rin
21. Kim Yong-sun
22. Yun Ki-bok
23. Kim Kwang-chin
24. Paek Hak-rim
25. Kim Ik-hyon
26. Ri Tu-ik
27. Choe In-tok
28. Hwang Sun-hui
29. Choe Song-suk
30. Kim Yong-yon
31. Ri Jong-san
32. Kim Jong-kak
33. O Ryong-pang
34. Ri Pyong-uk
35. Jong Chang-ryol
36. Ri Yong-su
37. Kim Ha-kyu
38. Hyon Chol-hae
39. Won Ung-hui
40. Pak Jae-kyong
41. Ri Myong-su
42. Kim Tae-sik
43. Ok Pong-ran
44. Kim Myong-kuk
45. Kim Kyok-sik
46. Chang Song-u
47. Chon Chin-su
48. Ju Sang-song
49. Kim Il-chol
50. Kang Tong-yon
51. Pak Ki-song
52. Ri Yong-chol
53. Kim Yong-un
54. Chon Jae-son
55. Yo Chun-sok
56. Kim Song-kyu
57. Jong Ho-kyun
58. Paek Sang-ho
59. Ri Thaek-chol
60. O Kum-chol
61. Ri Yong-hwan
62. Kim Hyong-ryong
63. Chon Chi-ryon
64. Choe Sang-ryo
65. Ri Pyong-sam
66. Chi Yong-jun
67. Kim Ki-son
68. Pak Sung-won
69. An Pi-tuk
70. Ri Pong-ju
71. Kim Sung-yon
72. Ri Chang-han
73. Jong Thae-kun
74. Yom Chol-song
75. Pyon Sang-mo
76. Kim Mun-hong
77. Ri Chu-ul
78. Han Tae-myon
79. Son Chol-ju
80. Kim Sang-thae
81. Choe Ho-jun
82. Tong Yong-il
83. Kim Ki-nam
84. Paek Bo-kyong
85. Kim Tu-nam

Political offices
Preceded by O Jin-u	Minister of People's Armed Forces; 1995–1997	Succeeded by Kim Il-chol
Preceded by Office established	Vice Chairmen of the National Defence Commission; 1990–1997	Succeeded by Jo Myong-rok
Preceded by	Vice Minister of People's Armed Forces; 1962–	Succeeded by
Preceded by	Vice Premier of North Korea; March 1981– May 24, 1990	Succeeded by
Military offices
Preceded by Kim Chang-bong	Chief of the General Staff of the Korean People's Army; 1962–1968	Succeeded by O Jin-u
Preceded by O Kuk-ryol	Chief of the General Staff of the Korean People's Army; 1988–1995	Succeeded by Kim Yong-chun
Preceded by	commander of the korean peoples air force Korean People's Army Air and Anti-Air Force; 1958–	Succeeded by
