= Ri Chol-bong =

North Korean politician

- 리철봉

Minister of People's Security
- In office 1984–1985
- Supreme Leader: Kim Il Sung

Kangwon WPK Secretary
- In office 2006–2009

Personal details
- Died: 25 December 2009
- Citizenship: North Korean
- Party: Workers' Party of Korea
- Education: Mangyongdae Revolutionary School

Military service
- Allegiance: North Korea
- Branch/service: Korean People's Army

Korean name
- Hangul: 리철봉
- RR: Ri Cheolbong
- MR: Ri Ch'ŏlbong

Ri Chol-bong (Korean: 리철봉; died December 25, 2009) was a North Korean politician who served in various party and state posts, among them as Minister of Social Security.

== Biography ==
He entered the Mangyongdae Revolutionary School after liberation of Korea. In 1950, when the Korean War broke out, he enlisted in the military and remained in the military afterwards, reaching the rank of major general in 1970. In November 1970, he was elected as a candidate member of the Central Committee at the 5th Party Congress. Since the 80s, he served as vice department director of the WPK Central Committee, minister of City Administration and director of the Political Bureau of the Ministry of Railways. In 1984-1985 he served as Minister of Social Security. In the 1998 North Korean parliamentary election, he won a seat in the Supreme People's Assembly serving as a member the presidium of the 10th Supreme People's Assembly. In October 2006 he was appointed as secretary of the Kangwon Province WPK committee. According to KCNA he died in a car accident.
