= Ri Pyong-sam =

North Korean politician (1935–2026)

- Hangul: 리병삼
- Hanja: 李炳三
- RR: Ri Byeongsam
- MR: Ri Pyŏngsam

Ri Pyong-sam (리병삼; 1 July 1935 – c. late March 2026) was a North Korean politician who was the Political Director of North Korea's People's Internal Security Forces. He succeeded General Ju San-song who was dismissed in 2011 due to illness.

== Life and career ==
Ri was educated at Kim Il Sung Military University.

He was appointed Lieutenant General in April 1992 and Colonel General in April 1999. He was a delegate to the Supreme People's Assembly (SPA) in 1998, 2003 and 2009. He has also been a member of several state funeral committees including those for Marshal Choe Kwang in 1997 and Vice Marshal Jo Myong-rok in 2010. Ri was elected to membership on the Party Central Committee in September 2010.

The Presidium of the SPA conferred upon him the title of Labor Hero on 19 October 2011.

On 25 March 2026, North Korean state media reported that Ri Pyong-sam had died at the age of 90, and Kim Jong Un sent a wreath to his bier on 24 March. However, the Korean Central News Agency did not mention his exact death date.
