= Pae Tal-jun =

North Korean politician and bureaucrat

- Hangul: 배달준
- Hanja: 裵達俊
- RR: Bae Daljun
- MR: Pae Talchun

Pae Tal-jun (born 1936) is a high-ranking North Korean politician and bureaucrat. He formerly served as Minister of State Construction Control (국가건설감독성 상) and as Chairman of the Central Committee of the Korean Union of Architects (조선건축가동맹). He was appointed to the Ministerial post in 1998 by the 10th Supreme People's Assembly, at which he was also a delegate.

Pae also served as a delegate to the Assembly's 11th session in 2003. In 2004, he was awarded the Order of Kim Il Sung.

Pae is a graduate of Bratislava University of Czechoslovakia. He began his career as a city planner in Pyongyang in 1966, becoming a vice chairman of the State Construction Committee (국가건설위원회) in 1983.

== See also ==
- Politics of North Korea
