= Pak Chang-sik =

North Korean politician

- Hangul: 박창식
- Hanja: 朴昌植
- RR: Bak Changsik
- MR: Pak Ch'angsik

Pak Chang-sik (born c. 1958) is a North Korean politician from the city of Chongjin in North Hamgyong province. He has served continuously in the Supreme People's Assembly since 1986, beginning with the 8th session and continuing through the 9th, 10th, and 11th sessions. He has also been Vice Chairman of the People's Committee of Chongjin since 1990. He has also reportedly worked for 30 years as a diver at the Rason marine cooperative, traveling throughout the country to participate in various construction projects including the Nampho Dam.

== Awards and honors ==
A frame displaying Pak's medals was shown in a documentary film.

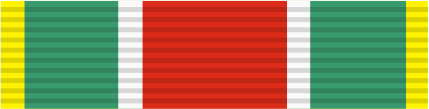

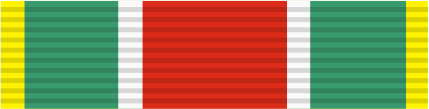

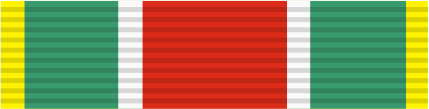

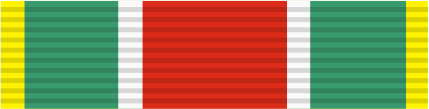

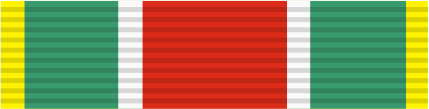

== See also ==
- Politics of North Korea
