= An Yong-hyon =

North Korean politician

- Hangul: 안영현
- Hanja: 安永賢
- RR: An Yeonghyeon
- MR: An Yŏnghyŏn

An Yong-hyon is a North Korean politician. He served as a delegate to the 10th and 11th sessions of the Supreme People's Assembly, held in 1998 and 2003.

== See also ==
- Politics of North Korea
