= Jong Chang-ryol =

North Korean general (born 1923)

- Supreme Leader: Kim Jong Il

Personal details
- Born: 1923 (age 102–103) Korea, Empire of Japan
- Citizenship: North Korean
- Party: Workers' Party of Korea
- Education: Pyongyang Construction University

Military service
- Allegiance: North Korea
- Branch/service: Korean People's Army
- Rank: General

Jong Chang-ryol (Korean: 정창렬, born 1923) is a North Korean general and politician. He was the Vice-Minister of the People's Armed Forces Department, the Chief of the People's Army, and member of the 12th convocation of the Supreme People's Assembly. He holds the rank General of the Army (Daejang).

== Biography ==
Born in 1923 in Hwanghae-do during the Japanese colonial rule, he graduated from Pyongyang Construction University, and studied abroad in the Soviet Union. In June 1982, he was promoted to Lieutenant General of the Korean People's Army, and in January 1984 he was promoted to the Deputy Chief of the General Staff Department of the Korean People's Army and promoted to the People's Army in June 1985. In July 1992, he was appointed Vice-Minister of the Ministry of People's Armed Forces.

After being promoted to General of the Korean People's Army in April 1997, he resigned from his position of Vice-Minister of the Ministry of People's Armed Forces in September 2000 (construction officer of the People's Armed Forces Department).

He was elected as the deputy to the 10th convocation Supreme People's Assembly in September 1998, passed the 11th delegate in September 2003, and has been the 12th delegate since April 2009. In April 1982, he was awarded the Order of Kim Il Sung, and in June 1986, he was awarded the first level of Order of the National Flag, "Effort of Heroes" for the construction of Nampo Dam. He was member of the funeral committees of Choe Kwang in February 1997, Pak Song-chol in October 2008 and Jo Myong-rok in November 2010.
