= Ryo Chun-sok =

North Korean General (1931–2018)

- 려춘석

Personal details
- Born: 10 July 1931 Chongju, Korea, Empire of Japan
- Died: 26 August 2018 (aged 87)
- Citizenship: North Korean
- Party: Workers' Party of Korea
- Occupation: Military officer, politician

Military service
- Allegiance: North Korea
- Branch/service: Korean People's Army
- Rank: General

Ryo Chun-seok (Korean: 려춘석; 10 July 1931 – 26 August 2018) was a North Korean military officer and politician. Ryo was a general of the Korean People's Army, President of the Kim Il Sung Military University and a member of the Central Committee of the Party. He was delegate to the 12th convocation of the Supreme People's Assembly.

== Biography ==
In September 1975, he served as Chief of Staff of the 5th Corps as the rank of the Major General of the Korean People's Army, and was elected to the party's Central Committee candidate member in October 1980. In December 1984, he was appointed Lieutenant General of the People's Army to become the 4th Corps commander. In April 1992, he was promoted, and was appointed to the 7th Army Corps Commander in October 1994.

In November 1997, he became Vice-Minister of the Ministry of People's Armed Forces, and in September 1998. In April 2002, he was promoted to Army General. Since February 2008, he has served as president of the Kim Il Sung Military University. In September 2010, he was elected to the Central Committee of the Workers' Party of Korea.

Chun-sok died on 26 August 2018, at the age of 87. His death wasn't made public until September 2024.
