= Choe Sang-ryo =

North Korean politician

Member of the Central Military Commission of the WPK
- Supreme Leader: Kim Jong-il; Kim Jong-un

Personal details
- Citizenship: North Korean
- Party: Workers' Party of Korea

Military service
- Allegiance: North Korea
- Branch/service: Korean People's Army
- Rank: Sangjang (Colonel-general)

Choe Sang-ryo (Korean: 최상려) is a North Korean politician and a Colonel general of the Korean People's Army. He is a member of Central Military Commission of the Workers' Party of Korea and served as a member of the Supreme People's Assembly, North Korea's unicameral parliament.

== Biography ==
In April 1992 he was promoted to Major General. He was promoted to lieutenant general in April 1997. In 1998 he became a member of the 10th convocation of the Supreme People's Assembly for the 658th electoral district.

In April 2010 he was awarded the rank of a three-star colonel general (Sangjang). During the 3rd Conference of the Workers' Party of Korea on September 28, 2010, he was elected a member of the Central Military Commission of the PPK Central Committee, the most important body of the Korean Labor Party responsible for military affairs, and also sat on the Central Committee for the first time.

In 1997 he was member of the funeral committee of Minister of Defense, Choe Kwang. In November 2010 he was a member of the funeral committee of Jo Myong-rok. After the death of Kim Jong-il in December 2011, Choe Sang-ryo was in 67th place in the 232-person Funeral Committee.
