= Jon Mun-sop =

North Korean politician (1919–1998)

Vice President of the Presidium of the Supreme People's Assembly
- In office 10 September 1998 – December 1998

Personal details
- Born: November 24, 1919 Manchuria
- Died: 29 December 1998 (aged 79)
- Party: Workers' Party of Korea

Jon Mun-sop (November 24, 1919 – December 29, 1998) was a North Korean politician, member of the Supreme People's Assembly, the unicameral parliament of North Korea.

== Biography ==
Jon was born in Manchuria on November 24, 1919. He took part in the armed struggle against the Japanese colonial rule in Korea at age 18. With the establishment of North Korea and became a vice Minister of Public Safety in 1963, chairman of the Control Committee in 1972 and a party Politburo member in 1976. Since October 1980 he was member of the 6th Central Committee of the Workers' Party of Korea. He was Honorable one of four Vice Presidents of the Presidium of the 10th convocation of the Supreme People's Assembly.

== Works ==
- Jon Mun-sop (1970). "Defend the Revolutionary Banner to the End". Reminiscences of the Anti-Japanese Guerillas. Pyongyang: Foreign Languages Publishing House. OCLC 869368184.
- — (1977). Taking a Machine Gun Himself. Pyongyang: Foreign Languages Publishing House. OCLC 6423895.
