= An Kyong-ho =

North Korean politician

- Hangul: 안경호
- Hanja: 安京浩
- RR: An Gyeongho
- MR: An Kyŏngho

An Kyong-ho (18 January 1930 – January 2016) was a North Korean politician.

He was born in Gangwon, and is a graduate of Kim Il Sung University in Pyongyang. He formerly served as the Chief Director of the Committee for the Peaceful Reunification of the Fatherland . He first entered international news in 1988, when he attended south–north preparatory talks. He was a delegate to the 9th and 11th sessions of the Supreme People's Assembly, held in 1990 and 2003.

== See also ==
- Politics of North Korea
