= Kang Tong-yun =

North Korean politician

- Occupations: politician, deputy chief of party central committee, Colonel General of Korean People's Army, member of party central committee

Korean name
- Hangul: 강동윤
- Hanja: 姜東潤
- RR: Gang Dongyun
- MR: Kang Tongyun

Kang Tong-yun (Korean: 강동윤) is a North Korean politician. He is a Colonel General of the Korean People's Army and a member of the Central Committee of the Workers' Party of Korea (WPK).

== Career ==
In March 1988, Kang was elected an alternate member of the WPK Central Committee, and in December 1991 he became a regular member of the central committee. After being promoted to Colonel General of the Korean People's Army in April 1992, he served as commander of the 108th Mechanization Corps starting in June 1994 and was appointed commander of the 425th Mechanization Corps in October 1996. In January 2007, he became a deputy department head in the WPK central committee. In September 2010, he was made a full member of the central committee.

== Delegate to Supreme People's Assembly ==
In 1990, he was elected as a delegate to the 9th Supreme People's Assembly (SPA), and in 1998 he was elected to the 10th SPA.

== Awards ==
In February 2000, he received the Order of the National Flag 1st Class, with a gold star medal, and the title Hero of the Republic.

Kang was a member of the national mourning committees for the deaths of Kim Il Sung in 1994, O Jin-u in 1995, Choe Kwang in 1997, and Kim Jong Il in 2011.
