= Kim Yang-chom =

North Korean general and politician

- 김양점

Member of the Supreme People's Assembly
- In office 1998–2014
- Supreme Leader: Kim Jong Il

Deputy Minister of People's Armed Forces
- In office April 2002 – Unknown

Personal details
- Born: 1944
- Died: 2014 (aged 69–70)
- Resting place: Patriotic Martyrs' Cemetery
- Party: Workers' Party of Korea

Kim Yang-chom (Korean: 김양점; Hanja: 金養点; 1944–2014) is a North Korean general and politician.

== Biography ==
He was born in 1944. In 1981 he became Senior Staff of the Department of Engineers of the Ministry of People's Armed Forces. In April 1991 he was appointed to Major. In April 1992 he became head of the department of Engineers in the Ministry of People's Armed Forces and promoted to Lieutenant General. He was elected in September 1998 to the 10th convocation of the Supreme People's Assembly. He was elected again to the 11th convocation in 2003 and 12th convocation in 2009. In October 2005 he was member of the funeral committee of Yon Hyong-muk and in 2008 he was member of the funeral committee of Pak Song-chol. He died in 2014.
