= An Myong-ok =

North Korean politician

- Hangul: 안명옥
- Hanja: 安明玉
- RR: An Myeongok
- MR: An Myŏngok

An Myong-ok is a North Korean politician. He served as a delegate to all sessions of the Supreme People's Assembly, from the 8th in 1986 to the 11th in 2003.

== See also ==
- Politics of North Korea
