= Paek Sang-ho =

North Korean Colonel General

- Hangul: 백상호
- Hanja: 白相浩
- RR: Baek Sangho
- MR: Paek Sangho

Paek Sang-ho is a North Korean colonel general. He has been an alternate member to the Central Committee of the Workers' Party of Korea since 1993. He served on the 10th Supreme People's Assembly, from 1998 to 2003. Paek gained the rank of colonel general in 2002, in a ceremony held on Kim Jong-il's birthday. Previously, he had been a lieutenant general since 1992.

== See also ==
- Politics of North Korea
