= Paek Nam-il =

North Korean politician

- Hangul: 백남일
- Hanja: 白南一
- RR: Baek Namil
- MR: Paek Namil

Paek Nam-il is a North Korean politician. He has been a delegate to the past four sessions of the Supreme People's Assembly: the 8th beginning in 1986, the 9th beginning in 1990, the 10th beginning in 1998, and the 11th beginning in 2003.

== See also ==
- Politics of North Korea
