= An Chang-ryon =

North Korean politician

- Hangul: 안창련
- Hanja: 安昌連
- RR: An Changryeon
- MR: An Ch'angnyŏn

An Chang-ryon (Korean: 안창련) is a North Korean politician. He served as a delegate to the Supreme People's Assembly during its 9th (1990), 10th (1998), and 11th (2003) sessions.

== See also ==
- Politics of North Korea
