= An Min-chol =

North Korean politician and bureaucrat

- Hangul: 안민철
- Hanja: 安民哲
- RR: An Mincheol
- MR: An Minch'ŏl

An Min-chol is a North Korean politician and bureaucrat. He was a delegate to the 10th and 11th sessions of the Supreme People's Assembly. In addition, he serves at the general manager of the Sŏwŏn Cooperative Farm Committee in Pŏng-gun, South Hwanghae Province.

== See also ==
- Politics of North Korea
