= Kim Hyong-ryong =

North Korean military officer and politician

Personal details
- Citizenship: North Korean
- Party: Workers' Party of Korea
- Education: Telecommunications Military School; Kim Il Sung Military University
- Occupation: Military officer, politician

Military service
- Allegiance: North Korea
- Branch/service: Korean People's Army
- Rank: Colonel general

Kim Hyong-ryong (Korean: 김형룡) is a military officer and politician of North Korea. He is a member of the Central Committee of the Workers' Party of Korea and is a public diplomat of the Korean People's Army. He also served as member of parliament in the Supreme People's Assembly, North Korea's unicameral parliament.

== Biography ==
He Graduated from Telecommunications Military School and Kim Il Sung Military University. In April 1992, he was appointed Director of the Ministry of People's Armed Forces, and was appointed to the Chief of Communications of the Ministry of People's Armed Forces. He was promoted to Lieutenant General of the Korean People's Army in October 1995 and to Colonel general July 2003. In September 2010, he was elected to the Central Committee of the Workers' Party of Korea. In 1998, he was elected a deputy to the 10th convocation of the Supreme People's Assembly and to the 11th convocation in 2003. He was a member of the funeral committees at the time of the death of O Jin-u in 1995, Jo Myong-rok in 2010, and following the death of Kim Jong Il in 2011.

== Awards and honors ==
Kim could be seen wearing multiple decorations during a visit to Beijing.

Order of Kim Il Sung

Order of the National Flag First Class, four times

Order of Freedom and Independence First Class

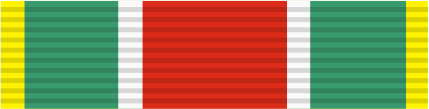
Order of Korean Labour, twice

Commemorative Order "Foundation of the Democratic People's Republic of Korea"

Commemorative Order "Anniversary of the Foundation of the People's Army"

Order of Military Service Honour First Class

Commemorative Order "30th Anniversary of the Agricultural Presentation"

Order of the National Flag Second Class, three times

Order of the Red Banner of Three Great Revolutions

Order of the National Flag Third Class, twice

Order of Military Service Honour Third Class

Soldier's Medal of Honour Second Class

Commemorative Order "50th Anniversary of the Foundation of the Democratic People's Republic of Korea"

Medal For Military Merit, three times
