= Kang Kwan-ju =

North Korean politician (born 1930)

- 강관주 (康寬柱)
- Born: 5 July 1930 (age 95); Taedong County, Heian'nan Province, Korea, Empire of Japan
- Education: Kim Il Sung University, Kim Il Sung Higher Party School
- Occupations: politician, head of Department 225, alternate member of party central committee, vice-chair of Committee for the Peaceful Reunification of the Fatherland
- Children: Kang Jong Ok (daughter)
- Relatives: Kang Kwan Suk (previous director of central library, wife of Kim Dal-hyon)

Korean name
- Hangul: 강관주
- Hanja: 康寬柱
- RR: Gang Gwanju
- MR: Kang Kwanju

Kang Kwan-ju (born 5 July 1930), or Kang Chu Il, is a North Korean politician. He is head of department 225 of the Cabinet of North Korea, and an alternative member of the 6th Central Committee of the Workers' Party of Korea. He is the vice-chair of the Committee for the Peaceful Reunification of the Fatherland.

== Career ==
He was born on 5 July 1930 in Taedong County, South Pyongan Province, in Korea under Japanese rule. He graduated from Kim Il Sung University in 1960 and subsequently from the Kim Il Sung Higher Party School. He served as a researcher for the Physical Education Science Research Center starting in 1961, and as the vice-manager of the Mankyongdae Art Company public relations division and section chief of the WPK Cultural Department. In May 1975, he was appointed office manager of the Society For Cultural Relations With Foreign Countries, and in 1986 he became deputy chief of the WPK Organizational Bureau.

After being appointed to the WPK central committee and to the position deputy chief for relations with Chochongryon in the WPK United Front Department in March 1988, in March 1989 Kang became first deputy chief of the WPK United Front Department, and in August 1990 he became a deputy member of the Committee for the Peaceful Reunification of the Fatherland. He was appointed advisor to the Pochonbo Electronic Ensemble in September 1991, and as head of the WPK United Front Department in January 1993.

In February 1997, he was made head of the WPK external relations department (previously the Social and Cultural Department), and he is currently serving as head of Department 225. In September 2010, he was appointed an alternate member of the Central Committee of the Workers' Party of Korea.

Kang was a member of the national mourning committees for the deaths of Kim Il Sung in 1994, O Chin-u in 1995, Park Song-chol in 2008, Kim Jung-rin in 2010, and Kim Jong Il in 2011.

== Delegate to Supreme People's Assembly ==
In April 1990, he was elected to the 9th session of the Supreme People's Assembly, and subsequently also served in the 10th (1998) and 11th (2003) assemblies.

== Awards ==
In April 1992, Kang received the Order of Kim Il Sung.
