= Choe Hui-jong =

North Korean politician

Member of the Supreme People's Assembly
- In office 1998–2013
- Supreme Leader: Kim Jong Il

Personal details
- Born: 22 October 1946 Kōgen-dō (Gangwon Province), Korea, Empire of Japan
- Citizenship: North Korean
- Party: Workers' Party of Korea
- Education: Kim Chaek University of Technology

Choe Hui-jong (Korean: 최희정) is a politician of the Democratic People's Republic of Korea. He is the Head of the Science Education Department of the Workers' Party of Korea and a member of the Central Committee of the Party. He was a delegate to the 10th convocation, 11th convocation and 12th convocation of the Supreme People's Assembly, North Korea's unicameral parliament.

== Biography ==
Born in 1946. He studied metal processing engineering at Kim Chaek University of Technology. In March 1975, he was transferred the 3rd Revolution of the Kaesong Textile Factory, and in November 1993 he was appointed head of the Institute of Rapid Cooling and Structural Engineering at the Institute of Science and Technology of the Academy of Sciences of the Democratic People's Republic of Korea. In February 1994, he became the chairman of the National Science and Technology Committee and the head of the Korean Federation of Science and Technology. In December of the same year, he became president of the People's University Training Party. In 2002, he served as chair of the Library Association and in 2007, became director of the National Quality Supervision Bureau.

He served as the 10th and 11th delegates of the Supreme People's Assembly in 1998 and 2003, respectively, and was elected as the 12th convocation in 2009.

In September 2009, he was elected to the Central Committee of Science Education of the Party and to the Central Committee of the Chosun Workers' Party in September of the following year.

At the time of the death of Pak Song-chol in October 2008, Kim Jong-rin in April and November 2010, and Jo Myong-rok he was member of their funeral committees.
