= Mun Jong-nam =

North Korean diplomat (died 2022)

North Korea ambassador to Syria
- In office 30 May 2018 – 8 March 2022
- Leader: Kim Jong-un

North Korea ambassador to Italy
- In office 28 August 2017 – 1 October 2017
- Leader: Kim Jong-un

Personal details
- Occupation: Diplomat

Korean name
- Hangul: 문정남
- RR: Mun Jeongnam
- MR: Mun Chŏngnam

Mun Jong-nam (died 8 March 2022) was a North Korean diplomat and official, who served as North Korea’s Ambassador to Syria. He also served abroad in Thailand and Italy.

== Life and career ==
Mun Jong-nam was a long-time foreign ministry official. He served in the international organization bureau at the North Korean foreign ministry. He has also served as an official in the World Food Programme National Coordination Committee at Pyongyang.

Mun had served in North Korea's embassy in Thailand.

In July 2017 Mun was nominated to be the new ambassador to Rome, after the post had been vacant for over a year according to South Korean sources. His predecessor Kim Chun-guk had died of liver cancer. However, Italy demanded on 1 October as a retaliation for North Korean nuclear and ballistic missile tests that he should leave the country. Mun had started working in Italy but had not finished the accreditation process. Italy had earlier approved his nomination. Mun had been in Rome for about a month, as he had assumed the post on 28 August.

At the time of his death Mun was the North Korean ambassador to Syria. He presented his credentials on 30 May 2018 in Damascus. During the ceremony, Syrian president Bashar al-Assad is said by KCNA to have proclaimed that he will visit North Korea and meet with leader Kim Jong-un.

Mun died from a stroke on 8 March 2022.

== Works ==
- Investment in land and water in the DPR Korea - Mun Jong Nam

== See also ==
- Foreign relations of North Korea
- Pak Ui-chun
