= Ri Jong-man =

North Korean footballer

Personal information
- Date of birth: 8 March 1959 (age 67)
- Place of birth: Pyongyang, North Korea
- Height: 1.72 m (5 ft 8 in)
- Position: Midfielder

International career
Years	Team	Apps	(Gls)
1980–1990	North Korea	23	(1)

Managerial career
- 2001–2003: North Korea
- 2006–2007: North Korea
- 2013–: Pyongyang SC

- Ri Jong-man
- Hangul: 리정만
- RR: Ri Jeongman
- MR: Ri Chŏngman

Ri Jong-man (Korean: 리정만; born 8 March 1959) is a North Korean former footballer. He represented North Korea on at least twenty-three occasions between 1980 and 1990, scoring once, and also coached the national team.

== Career statistics ==
=== International ===
National team	Year	Apps	Goals
North Korea	1980	4	1
North Korea	1981	1	0
North Korea	1988	3	0
North Korea	1989	7	0
North Korea	1990	8	0
Total		23	1

=== International goals ===
Scores and results list North Korea's goal tally first, score column indicates score after each North Korea goal.

List of international goals scored by Ri
No.	Date	Venue	Opponent	Score	Result	Competition
1	28 December 1980	Government Stadium, Hong Kong	Hong Kong	1–0	2–2	1982 FIFA World Cup qualification
