= Kim Myong-guk =

North Korean politician (1940–2016)

- Kim Myong-guk

Member of the Central Military Commission of the WPK
- Supreme Leader: Kim Jong Il; Kim Jong Un

Personal details
- Born: 1940
- Died: November 28, 2016
- Party: Workers' Party of Korea
- Education: Red Flag Mangyongdae Revolutionary School
- Alma mater: Kim Il Sung Military University

Military service
- Allegiance: North Korea
- Branch/service: Korean People's Army
- Rank: General

Kim Myong-guk (Korean: 김명국, 1940 – 28 November 2016) was a North Korean politician and army general in the Korean People's Army. He was member of the Central Military Commission of the Workers' Party of Korea and served as member of the Supreme People's Assembly, North Korea's unicameral parliament.

== Biography ==
Kim Myong-guk was born in 1940. A graduate of the Kim Il Sung Military University, he also studied at the Frunze Military Academy in Moscow.

Subsequently, he was employed in the People's Army as an officer for military planning and later was a lecturer and senior lecturer for strategy and tactics at military schools and Kim Il Sung University. He was also chief of staff at the training facility April 25 and was promoted to Lieutenant General of the People's Army in 1982. As such, he took over the post of head of the training department in the main administration operation of the general staff in 1984 and was also a planning officer in the Ministry of the People's Armed Forces and tutor for military affairs of his cousin Kim Jong Il.

In June 1989, he was appointed deputy member of the Central Committee of the Korean Workers' Party. He also held the parliamentary mandate in the 9th and 10th convocations of the Supreme People's Assembly, from April 1990 to September 2003 and once again in the 12th convocation until his death.

He was promoted to a three-star general (상장, sangjang) in April 1992, and to a four-star general two years later, in April 1994. In the same year, he became the head of the Operations Department for the first time in the General Staff of the Korean People's Army. In February 1995, he sat for the first time in the Central Military Commission of the Central Committee of the WPK. In September 1997 he became commander of the 5th Corps of the Korean People's Army.

From April 2007, he was the operational commander of the North Korean armed forces for the second time. During the 3rd Conference of the Workers' Party of Korea on September 28, 2010, he was appointed a member of the Central Committee for the second time, and also sat for the first time as full member of the Central Committee (previously from June 1989 he was only a candidate member of the Central Committee).

In 1995 he was member of the funeral committee of O Jin-u. After the death of Kim Jong Il in December 2011, Kim Myong-guk was in 57th place in the 232-person funeral committee.

In February 2012 he was awarded the Order of Kim Jong Il.
