= Choe Su-hon =

North Korean politician (born 1939)

- Hangul: 최수헌
- Hanja: 崔守憲
- RR: Choe Suheon
- MR: Ch'oe Suhŏn

Choe Su-hon (Korean: 최수헌, born 7 October 1939) is the former vice foreign minister of North Korea who dealt principally with North Korea's relations with the European Union. He was replaced in this role in 2005 by Kung Sok-ung. It is unclear what position Choe now holds.
