= Pak Yong-sok =

North Korean politician (1928–2007)

- 박용석
- President: Kim Il Sung

Personal details
- Born: 1928 Kankyōhoku-dō (North Hamgyong Province), Korea, Empire of Japan
- Died: March 17, 2007 (aged 78–79)
- Party: Workers' Party of Korea
- Parent: Kim Il
- Education: Kim Il Sung University

Pak Yong-sok (Korean: 박용석; 1928 – March 17, 2007) was a North Korean politician, member of the Central Committee of the Workers’ Party of Korea, a government minister and a member of the Supreme People’s Assembly.

== Biography ==
Pak Yong-sok was born in North Hamgyong Province and later graduated from Kim Il Sung University and the Soviet Union Transportation Railway University. In 1961, he was appointed Minister of Transportation and Urban Construction. In 1967, he was elected as a representative in the election of the Supreme People's Assembly. In 1970, he was appointed as a member of the Party Central Committee. Two years later, he became the minister of transportation and urban construction. In 1977, he was appointed as the Minister of Railways and was re-elected as a representative member of the Supreme People's Assembly.

In 1980, Pak Yong-sok was re-elected as a member of the Party Central Committee. Two years later, he was awarded the Kim Il-sung Order and became the acting member of the Supreme People ’s Assembly for the third time. In 1985, he was promoted to chairman of the Transportation Committee of the Chinese Academy of Government. The following year, he also served as Minister of the Railway Department of the Government Administration Office. In 1990, he was elected acting representative of the Supreme People's Assembly for the fourth time. In 1994, Kim Il Sung died and Pak Yong-sok was included as a member of Kim Il Sung ’s Funeral Committee. The following year, he became a member of Wu Zhenyu's Funeral Committee. In 1998, he became the acting member of the Supreme People's Assembly for the fifth time. The following year, he became the chairman of the review of the Party Central Committee. In 2003, he was elected as the acting representative of the Supreme People's Assembly for the last time. In 2005, he was accepted as a member of the Yanhengmo mourning committee. He was member of the funeral committee of Yon Hyong-muk. On March 17, 2007, Pak Yong-sok died of cancer at the age of 78/79.
