= Ri Won-ho =

North Korean speed skater

Personal information
- Nationality: North Korean
- Born: 5 August 1972 (age 52)

Sport
- Sport: Short track speed skating

Ri Won-ho (born 5 August 1972) is a North Korean short track speed skater. He competed in the men's 1000 metres event at the 1992 Winter Olympics.
