= Pak Sung-won =

North Korean politician and military officer

Personal details
- Born: November 1946 (age 79)
- Citizenship: North Korean
- Party: Workers' Party of Korea
- Education: Kim Il-sung Military University
- Occupation: Military officer; politician

Military service
- Allegiance: North Korea
- Branch: Korean People's Army
- Rank: General

Park Sung-won (Korean: 박승원; born November 1946) is a former military officer and politician of the Democratic People's Republic of Korea (North Korea) who was a member of the Central Committee of the Workers' Party of Korea. He served as delegate to the 12th convocation of the Supreme People's Assembly. In 2015, he defected.

== Biography ==
Born in November 1946. He graduated from Kim Il-Sung Military University, and in April 1992, became the rank of general of the Korean People's Army. He served as Deputy Chief of Staff for the People's Army General Staff. In 1998, he served as the 10th delegate to the Supreme People's Assembly. It is the 12th delegate since April 2009. During the first inter-Korean defense ministers' meeting in September 2000, he served as Deputy Chairman of the North Korean delegation, and in April 2002, the rank of the People's Army was granted. In September 2010, he was elected to the Central Committee of the Workers' Party of Korea.

He participated in the funeral committees which organized the funerals of Choi Kwang in 1997, Yon Hyong-muk in 2005, Jo Myong-rok in 2010, and Kim Jong-il following his death in 2011. After leaving North Korea in April 2015, they filed for asylum with the South Korean Embassy in Moscow.
