= Ri Ha-il =

Korean general and politician (1935–2010)

- Born: 1935; Ryanggang Province, Japanese-controlled Korea
- Died: 2010 (aged 74–75); Pyongyang, North Korea
- Alma mater: Mangyongdae Revolutionary School
- Military career
- Allegiance: North Korea
- Branch: Korean People's Army
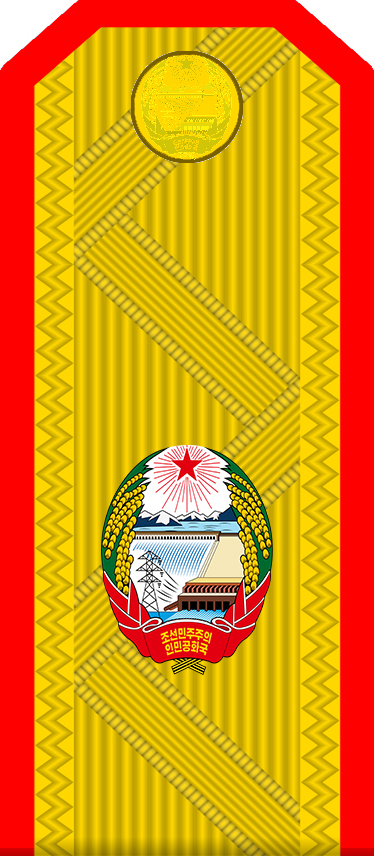
- Rank: Ch'asu (Vice Marshal)

Korean name
- Hangul: 리하일
- Hanja: 李夏一
- RR: Ri Hail
- MR: Ri Hail

Ri Ha-il (1935–2010) was a general and politician of the Democratic People's Republic of Korea. He was Vice Marshal of the Korean People's Army.

== Biography ==
Born in Ryanggang Province in 1935 during the Japanese colonial period, he graduated from Mangyongdae Revolutionary Academy and Soviet Military College. Since then, he served as Director of the Operations Department in the Ministry of People's Armed Forces, and was appointed Commander of the 525th Unit of the People's Army of Korea in 1975. In 1977, he passed the commander of the 534th Training Center and became the 8th General Commander of the People's Army in 1979.

In March 1982, he served as military commander of the Party and a member of the 6th Central Military Commission of the Workers' Party of Korea. In May 1990, he was elected to the National Defense Commission. Re-elected to the Central Military Commission in January 1992, he was promoted to the leader of the People's Army after receiving the Order of Kim Il Sung that same year. In October 1995, he was promoted to the ranks of the People's Army, and in September 2010, he lost his seat in the 6th Central Committee of the WPK. In February 1982, he was elected as the 7th delegate to the Supreme People's Assembly, and served as the 8th (1986), 9th (1990) and 10th (1998) delegates. In April 1982 and April 1992, Kim Il Sung received a medal, and in February 2012, Kim Jong Il received a medal. He was member of the funeral committee of Kim Il Sung in July 1994, O Jin-u in February 1995, Pak Song-chol in October 2008, and had been member of the National Defense Commission at the time of his death in November 2010.
