= Ri Jong-san =

North Korean politician and military officer

- Born: 1922; Republic of China
- Died: 23 July 2011 (aged 88–89); Pyongyang, North Korea
- Burial place: Revolutionary Martyrs' Cemetery, North Korea
- Military career
- Allegiance: North Korea
- Branch: Korean People's Army
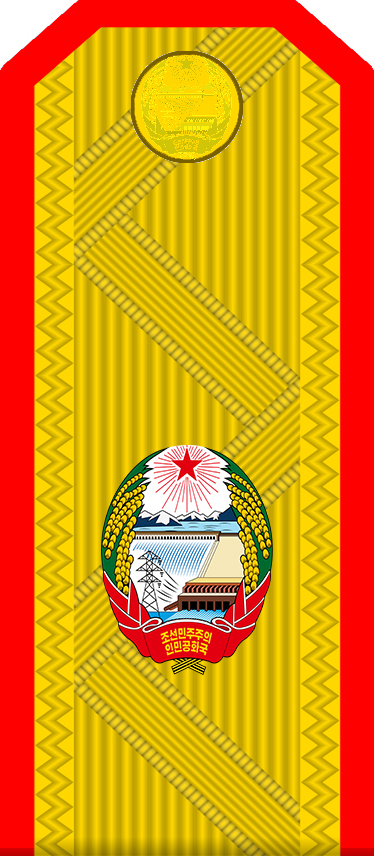
- Rank: Ch'asu (Vice Marshal)

Korean name
- Hangul: 리종산
- Hanja: 李鐘山
- RR: Ri Jongsan
- MR: Ri Chongsan

Ri Jong-san (1922 – July 23, 2011) was a military officer and politician of the Democratic People's Republic of Korea.

== Biography ==
He was born in China in 1922, He worked with Kim Il Sung as the first generation of anti-Japanese mountain guerrilla. Under Kim Il Sung, he served as Lieutenant General, Gunsu-Dong-Won, etc., and was promoted to Vice Marshal of the Korean People's Army in 1997.

Beginning in 2000, he was a minister without portfolio in the Cabinet of North Korea, but has been unable to participate due to illness. In 2005, he participated in the 60th anniversary of Russia's World War II victory as a chairman of the Veterans' Committee., and was reelected to the 12th Delegation of the Supreme People's Assembly of the Democratic People's Republic of Korea in April 2009. Li Jong-san was ranked 49th in the protocol at the time of the formation of the 1st Vice-chairman's Presidency Committee in 2010. He died after a long illness on July 23, 2011.
