= Kye Ung-thae =

North Korean politician (1925–2006)

Vice Premier of North Korea
- In office 11 December 1976 – 1983

Personal details
- Born: 25 February 1925 Korea, Empire of Japan
- Died: 23 November 2006 (aged 81)
- Cause of death: Breast cancer
- Citizenship: North Korean
- Party: Workers' Party of Korea
- Education: Soviet High Party School

Korean name
- Hangul: 계응태
- Hanja: 桂應泰
- RR: Gye Eungtae
- MR: Kye Ŭngt'ae

Kye Ung-thae (Korean: 계응태; 2 February 1925 – 23 November 2006) was a North Korean politician who served as Vice Premier of North Korea and as a member of the Politburo of the Workers' Party of Korea.

== Biography ==
Born on 2 February 1925, in Hirawon-gun, South Pyongan Province. He graduated from the Soviet High Party School. Since November 1967 he was a Deputy to the Supreme People's Assembly. In December 1967 he became Trade Minister. In November 1970 he became a member of the Central Committee of the Workers' Party of Korea. In December 1975 he became Vice Premier of North Korea. In 1980 he became a member of the Politburo. In November 1985 he became Party Secretary (Public Security). In February 1986, at the 11th Plenary Session of the 6th Central Committee of the Workers' Party of Korea, he was appointed as a secretary of the secretariat in charge of public security. Ri Kun-mo and Kim Hwan also became secretaries. In the November 1986 parliamentary election he was elected a member of the Supreme People's Assembly. In December 1986 he became Chairman of the Supreme People's Assembly Legislative Committee. He became a member of the party's Politburo in March 1988. He died in 2006 at the age of 81 from lung cancer.
