= Kim Il Sung Military University =

Military university in Pyongyang, North Korea

Coordinates: 39°0′11.7″N 125°40′11.8″E

- 김일성군사종합대학

- Emblem and both sides of the flag of the Kim Il Sung Military University.
- Pyongyang; North Korea

Information
- Type: Military academy
- Established: 25 October 1956; 69 years ago
- School district: Mangyongdae district

- Kim Il Sung Military University
- Hangul: 김일성군사종합대학
- Hanja: 金日成軍事綜合大學
- Revised Romanization: Gim Il-seong gunsajonghab daehak
- McCune–Reischauer: Kim Il-sŏng kunsa chonghap taehak

Kim Il Sung Military University (also known as Kim Il Sung Military Academy) is a university located in Mangyongdae-guyok, Pyongyang, capital of North Korea. Founded in 1948 and named after Kim Il Sung, founder of North Korea, the school is a post-secondary educational institution for officers in the Korean People's Army. It is the most prominent military academy in North Korea.

The university's post-graduate research institute is named as Kim Jong-il Military Research Institute.

The current president of the university is daejang Kim Kum-chol.

== Notable alumni ==
- Kim Jong Un
- Kim Yo Jong
- Kim Yong-chun
- Kim Jong-gak
- Chu Sang-song
- Ri Yong-ho
- Pak Jae-gyong
- Kim Pyong Il
