= Politics of North Korea =

Politics of the Democratic People's Republic of Korea 조선민주주의인민공화국의 정치 (Korean)
- National emblem of the Democratic People's Republic of Korea
- System: Unitary communist state
- Constitution: Constitution of the Democratic People's Republic of Korea

Leading force of state and society
- Party: Workers' Party of Korea
- General Secretary: Kim Jong Un
- Supreme organ: Congress
- Highest organ: Central Committee
- Political organ: Politburo
- Executive organ: Secretariat
- Military organ: Central Military Commission
- Auditing organ: Central Auditing Commission

Supreme state organ of power
- Full Convocation
- Name: Supreme People's Assembly
- Type: Unicameral
- Meeting place: Mansudae Assembly Hall, Pyongyang
- Permanent organ

Supreme executive and administrative organ
- Name: Cabinet
- Head of Government
- Title: Premier
- Currently: Pak Thae-song
- Appointer: Supreme People's Assembly

Supreme military organ
- Name: Central Military Commission
- Chairman: Kim Jong Un

Supreme judicial organ
- Name: Central Court
- Chief judge: Choe Kun-yong (President)
- Seat: Pyongyang

The politics of North Korea (officially the Democratic People's Republic of Korea or DPRK) takes place within the framework of the official state philosophy, Kimilsungism–Kimjongilism. Juche, a part of the philosophy, is the belief that true socialism is achieved only through self-reliance and a strong independent state.

North Korea's political system is built upon the principle of centralization. The constitution defines North Korea as "a dictatorship of people's democracy" under the leadership of the Workers' Party of Korea (WPK), which is given legal supremacy over other political parties. The WPK's General Secretary is typically the supreme leader, who controls its Presidium, Politburo, Secretariat and Central Military Commission, making the officeholder the most powerful person in North Korea.

The WPK is the ruling party of North Korea. It has been in power since its creation in 1948. Other minor political parties also exist, but are legally bound to accept the ruling role of the WPK. Elections occur only in single-candidate races where the candidate is effectively selected beforehand by the WPK. In addition to the minor political parties, there are over 100 mass organizations controlled by the WPK. Non-WPK members are required to join one of these organizations. The most important such organizations are the Socialist Patriotic Youth League, Socialist Women's Union of Korea, General Federation of Trade Unions of Korea, and Union of Agricultural Workers of Korea.

Outside observers generally view North Korea as a totalitarian dictatorship, particularly noting the elaborate cult of personality around Kim Il Sung and his family. The WPK, led by a member of the ruling family, holds power in the state. Kim Jong Il placed emphasis on the Songun or "military-first" philosophy, and all references to communism were removed from the North Korean constitution in 2009 in favor of it and Juche. Under Kim Jong Un, terminology such as communism and the socialist economy returned to common use. He also made Kimilsungism–Kimjongilism the main ideology of the country.

== History ==
Kim Il Sung ruled the country from 1948 until his death in July 1994, holding the offices of General Secretary of the WPK from 1949 to 1994 (titled as chairman from 1949 to 1972), Premier of North Korea from 1948 to 1972 and President from 1972 to 1994. He was succeeded by his son, Kim Jong Il. While the younger Kim had been his father's designated successor since the 1980s, it took him three years to consolidate his power. He was named to his father's old post of general secretary in 1997, and in 1998 became chairman of the National Defence Commission (NDC), which gave him command of the armed forces. The constitution was amended to make the NDC chairmanship "the highest post in the state." At the same time, the presidential post was written out of the constitution, and Kim Il Sung was designated "Eternal leader of Juche Korea" in order to honor his memory forever. Most analysts believe the title to be a product of the cult of personality he cultivated during his life.

== Political parties and elections ==
According to the Constitution of North Korea, the country is a democratic republic and the Supreme People's Assembly (SPA) and Provincial People's Assemblies (PPA,도 인민회의) are elected by direct universal suffrage and secret ballot. Suffrage is guaranteed to all citizens aged 17 and over. In reality, DPRK elections are for show and feature single-candidate races only. Those who want to vote against the sole candidate on the ballot must go to a special booth—in the presence of an electoral official—to cross out the candidate's name before dropping it into the ballot box—an act which, according to many North Korean defectors, is far too risky to even contemplate.

Until 2024, all elected candidates were members of the Democratic Front for the Reunification of Korea (DFRK), a popular front dominated by the ruling Workers' Party of Korea (WPK). The two minor parties are the Chondoist Chongu Party and the Korean Social Democratic Party, who also have a few elected officials. The WPK exercises direct control over the candidates selected for election by members of the other two parties. In the past, elections were contested by other minor parties as well, including the Korea Buddhist Federation, Democratic Independent Party, Dongro People's Party, Gonmin People's Alliance, and People's Republic Party.

== Political ideology ==
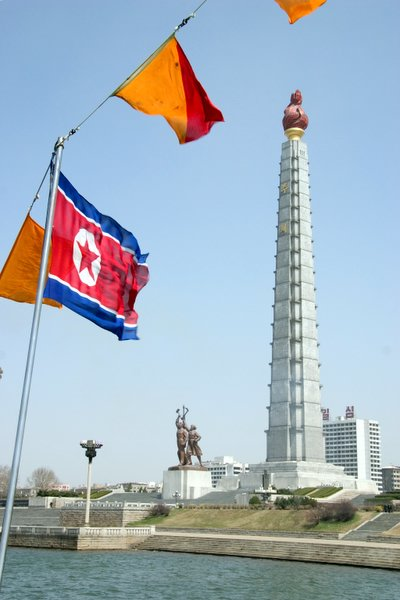
The Juche Tower symbolizes the official state philosophy of Juche.

Originally a close ally of Joseph Stalin's Soviet Union, North Korea has increasingly emphasized Juche, an adoption of socialist self-reliance, which roots from Marxism–Leninism, its adoption of a certain ideological form of Marxism–Leninism is specific to the conditions of North Korea. Juche was enshrined as the official ideology when the country adopted a new constitution in 1972. In 2009, the constitution was amended again, quietly removing the brief references to communism (Korean: 공산주의). However, North Korea continues to see itself as part of a worldwide leftist movement. The Workers' Party maintains a relationship with other leftist parties, sending a delegation to the International Meeting of Communist and Workers' Parties. North Korea has a strong relationship with Cuba; in 2016, the North Korean government declared three days of mourning after Fidel Castro's death.

== Political developments ==
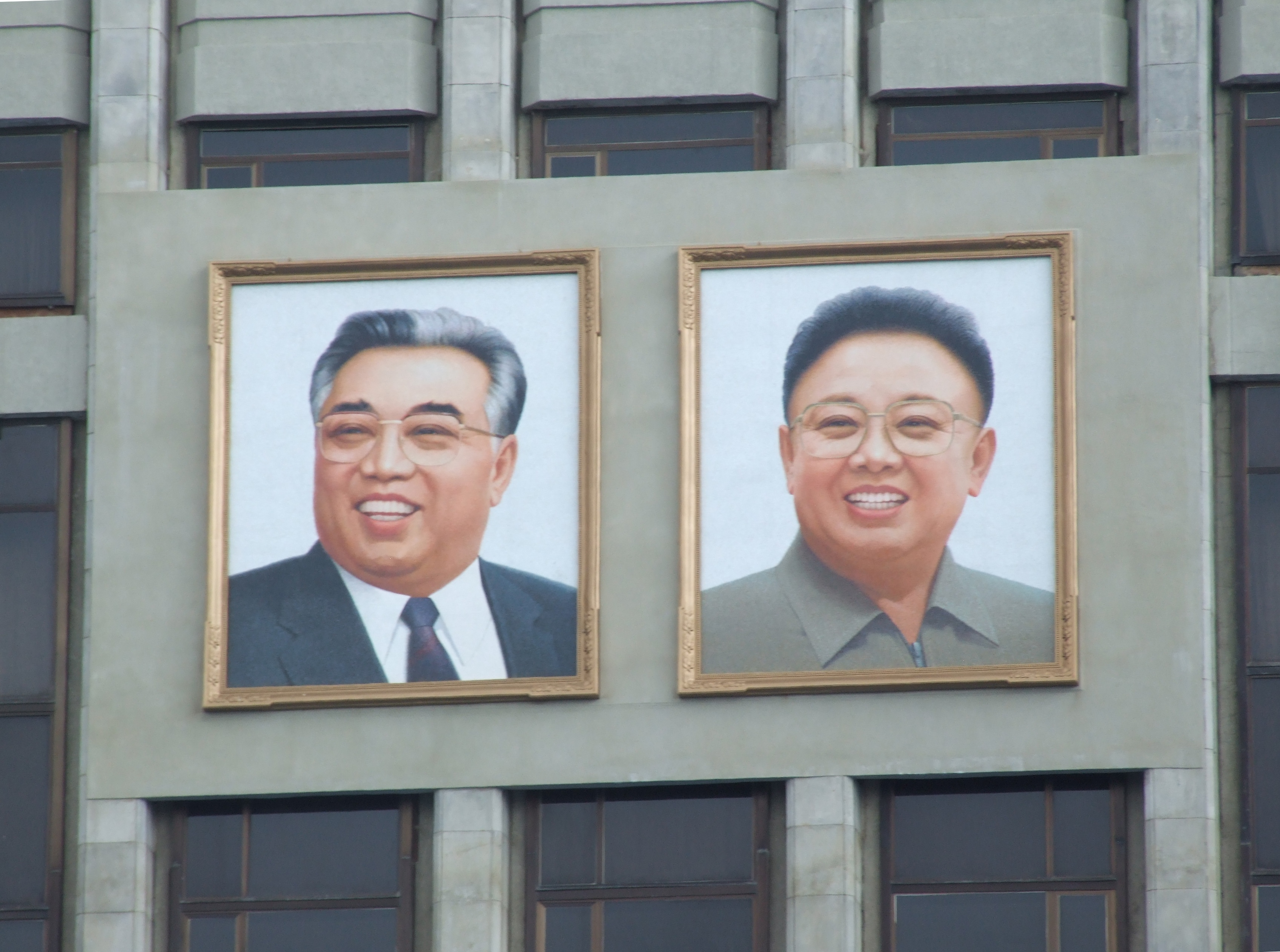
Portraits of the Eternal President, Kim Il Sung (left), and the Eternal General Secretary of the Workers' Party, Kim Jong Il (right).

For much of its history, North Korean politics have been dominated by its adversarial relationship with South Korea. During the Cold War, North Korea aligned with the Soviet Union and the People's Republic of China. The North Korean government invested heavily in its military, hoping to develop the capability to reunify Korea by force if possible and also preparing to repel any attack by South Korea or the United States. Following the doctrine of Juche, North Korea aimed for a high degree of economic independence and the mobilization of all the resources of the nation to defend Korean sovereignty against foreign powers.

In the wake of the collapse of the Soviet Union in the early 1990s and the loss of Soviet aid, North Korea faced a long period of economic crisis, including severe agricultural and industrial shortages. North Korea's main political issue has been to find a way to sustain its economy without compromising the internal stability of its government or its ability to respond to perceived external threats. Recently, North Korean efforts to improve relations with South Korea to increase trade and to receive development assistance have been mildly successful. North Korea has tried to improve its relations with South Korea by participating in the Pyeongchang Olympics, when Kim Jong Un sent his band and a few officials to visit South Korea. But North Korea's determination to develop nuclear weapons and ballistic missiles has prevented stable relations with both South Korea and the United States. North Korea has also experimented with market economics in some sectors of its economy, but these have had limited impact.

Although there are occasional reports of signs of opposition to the government, these appear to be isolated, and there is no evidence of major internal threats to the current government. Some foreign analysts have pointed to widespread starvation as a factor that could threaten the regime's stability. Rising rates of defection through the North Korea-China border have also been cited by some analysts as a sign of internal instability, though others caution it may be premature to predict imminent collapse on that basis. Others have pointed to the regime's weakening ability to control North Koreans' access to outside information — via smuggled media, foreign radio broadcasts, and cross-border communication — as a further destabilizing factor. However, North Korea has remained stable in spite of more than a decade of such predictions. The Workers' Party of Korea maintains a monopoly on political power and Kim Jong Il remained the leader of the country until 2011, ever since he first gained power following the death of his father.

After the death of Kim Il Sung in 1994, his son, Kim Jong Il became the new leader, which marked the closure of one chapter of North Korean politics. Combined with external shocks and the less charismatic personality of Kim Jong Il, the transition of the leadership moved North Korea toward less centralized control. There are three key institutions: the Korean People's Army (KPA), the Workers’ Party of Korea (WPK), and the cabinet. Rather than dominate a unified system as his father had, each party has their own enduring goals, therefore providing checks and balances to the government. No one party could claim victory and power over the other ones. With changing internal situation, combined with external pressure, the cabinet started to endorse policies it had rejected for years. North Korea politics is gradually becoming more open and negotiable with foreign countries.

Under Kim Jong Il the status of the military was enhanced, and appeared to occupy the center of the North Korean political system; all the social sectors were forced to follow the military spirit and adopt military methods. Kim Jong Il's public activity focused heavily on "on-the-spot guidance" of places and events related to the military. The enhanced status of the military and military-centered political system was confirmed in 1998 at the first session of the 10th Supreme People's Assembly (SPA) by the promotion of NDC members into the official power hierarchy. All ten NDC members were ranked within the top twenty on 5 September, and all but one occupied the top twenty at the fiftieth anniversary of the Day of the Foundation of the Republic on 9 September. Under Kim Jong Un there has been an increased emphasis on economic matters, with major defence spending needing support from an economic standpoint.

While the commonly accepted view is that no dissent can be expressed in North Korea, the notionally academic economic journal Kyo'ngje Yo'ngu and the philosophical and economic journals of Kim Il Sung University permit the presentation and discussion of the different views of various parts of the government.

=== Protests ===
In 2005, a riot began at Kim Il Sung Stadium during a World Cup qualification match, after a dispute between a North Korean player and a Syrian referee and the subsequent disqualification of the player.

Between 2006 and 2007, "market riots" erupted in the countryside when the government "unsuccessfully tried to restart" the Public Distribution System. Andrei Lankov goes on to say that the "outbreak of public discontent usually happens at the markets when vendors believe that their right to make money is being unfairly infringed by some decision of the authorities".

In June 2011, it was reported that the government had ordered universities to cancel most classes until April 2012, sending students to work on construction projects, presumably for fear of similar developments as in North Africa. In the previous months, the regime had ordered riot gear from China. However, "as soon as universities were reopened, graffiti appeared again. Perhaps the succession is not the real reason, but greater awareness among North Koreans could lead to changes."

== Transition of power to Kim Jong Un ==
=== Political power ===
After the death of Kim Jong Il on 17 December 2011, his youngest son, Kim Jong Un, inherited the political leadership of the DPRK. The succession of power was immediate: Kim Jong Un became Supreme Commander of the Korean People's Army on 30 December 2011, was appointed first secretary of the Workers’ Party of Korea (WPK) on 11 April 2012, and was entitled first chairman of the National Defense Commission (NDC) two days later. To gain complete political power, he became the military rank of Marshal of the KPA.

In 2016, North Korea created the State Affairs Commission, which replaced the National Defense Commission as the country's highest government entity and expanded Kim Jong Un's formal powers as its chairman.

=== Differences from the Kim Jong Il regime ===
Up until his death, Kim Jong Il maintained a strong national military-first political system that equated stability with military power. Kim Jong Un continues to carry on the militarized political style of his father, but with less commitment to complete military rule. Since he took power, Kim Jong Un has attempted to move political power away from the KPA and has divided it among the WPK and the cabinet. Because of his political lobbying, the WPK's Central Committee has vastly shifted power in April 2012: out of 17 members and 15 alternates of the Committee, only five members and six alternates derive from military and security sectors. Ever since, the economic power of the WPK, the cabinet, and the KPA has been in a tense balance. The KPA has lost a significant amount of economic influence because of the current regime, which continually shifts from what Kim Jong Il built his regime on, and may cause later internal issues.

== Foreign relations ==
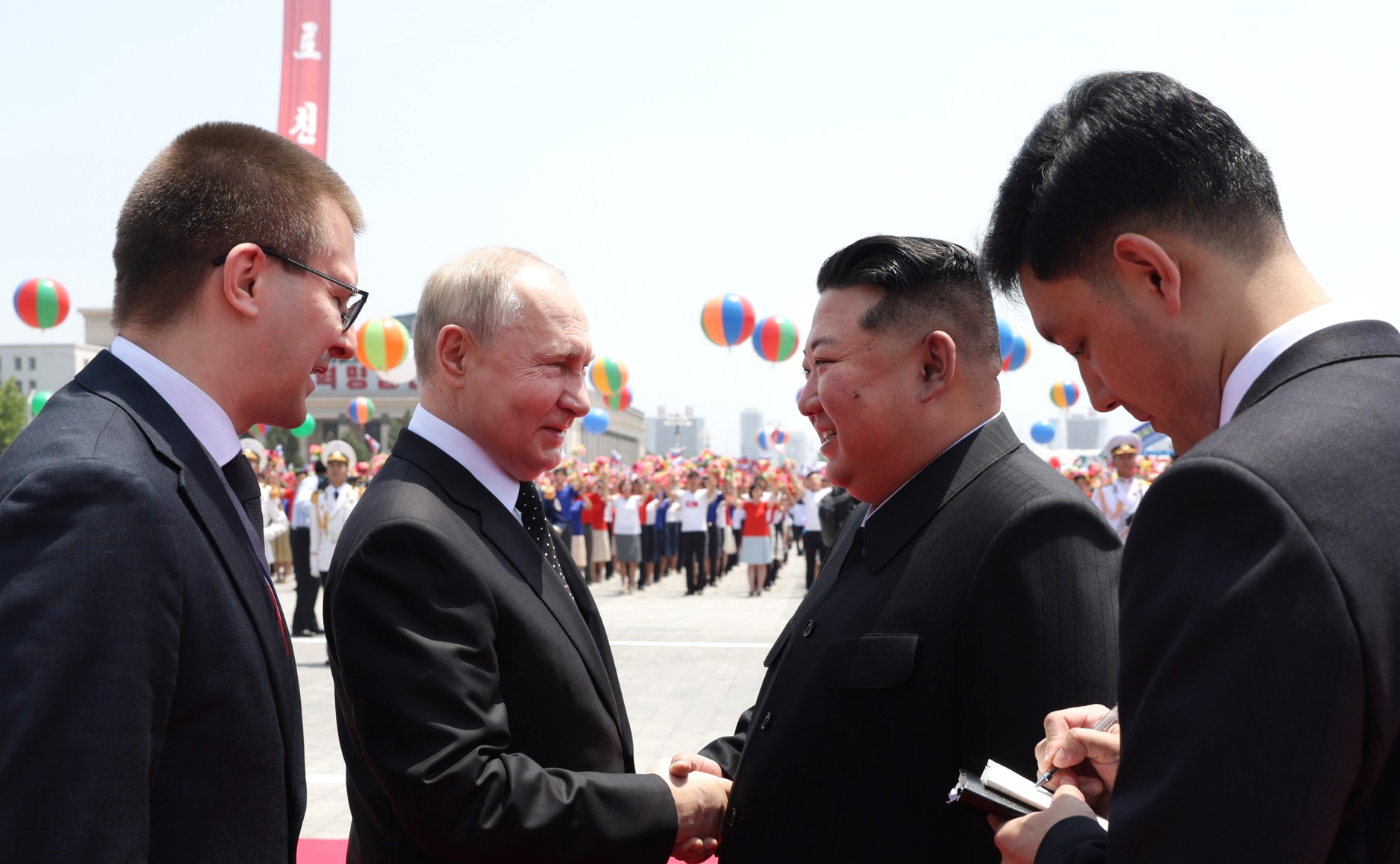
North Korean leader Kim Jong Un and Russian President Vladimir Putin in Pyongyang, North Korea, 19 June 2024

The foreign relations of North Korea have been shaped by its conflict with South Korea (officially the Republic of Korea) and its historical ties with world communism. The governments of both North and South Korea claim to be the sole legitimate government of the whole of Korea. The Korean War in the 1950s failed to resolve the issue, leaving North Korea locked in a military confrontation with South Korea and the United States Forces Korea across the Demilitarized Zone.

At the start of the Cold War, North Korea only had diplomatic recognition by communist countries. Over the following decades, it established relations with developing countries and joined the Non-Aligned Movement. When the Eastern Bloc collapsed in the years 1989–1992, North Korea made efforts to improve its diplomatic relations with developed capitalist countries. At the same time, there were international efforts to resolve the confrontation on the Korean peninsula (known as the Korean conflict). At the same time, North Korea acquired nuclear weapons, adding to the concerns of the international community.

== See also ==
- Censorship in North Korea
- Communism in Korea
