= 2nd Central Committee of the Workers' Party of Korea =

1948–1956 executive body in North Korea

2nd Central Committee
- Emblem of the Workers' Party of North Korea

30 March 1948 – 29 April 1956 (8 years, 30 days) Overview
- Type: Central Committee of the Workers' Party of Korea
- Election: 2nd Congress

Leadership
- Chairman: Kim Il Sung (49–56); Kim Tu-bong
- Vice Chairmen: Kim Il Sung; Chu Yong-ha
- First Secretary: Ho Ka-i
- Second Secretary: Yi Sung-yop
- Third Secretary: Kim Sam-yong
- Political Committee: 14 members
- Standing Committee: 16 members
- Organisation Committee: 11 members

Members
- Total: 98

Candidates
- Total: 20

The 2nd Central Committee (2nd CC) of the Workers' Party of Korea (WPK) was elected at the 2nd Congress on 30 March 1948, and remained in session until the election of the 3rd Central Committee on 29 April 1956. In between party congresses and specially convened conferences the Central Committee is the highest decision-making institution in the WPK and North Korea. The 2nd Central Committee was not a permanent institution and delegated day-to-day work to elected bodies, such as the Political Committee, the Standing Committee, the Organisation Committee and the Inspection Committee in this case. It convened meetings, known as "Plenary Session of the [term] Central Committee", to discuss major policies. Only full members had the right to vote, but if a full member could not attend a plenary session, the person's spot was taken over by an alternate. Plenary session could also be attended by non-members, such meetings are known as "Enlarged Plenary Session", to participate in the committee's discussions. During its tenure it held five plenary sessions, one enlarged session, seven joint plenary sessions and four stand-alone plenums.

A feature of North Korean politics was its factionalism. Four loosely defined factions were struggling for dominance; Kim Il Sung's partisans, domestic communists, the Yanan group and the Soviet Koreans. (Note: While a hallmark of early North Korean politics is factionalism, scholars Scalapino and Lee notes that "To place too much emphasis upon factional affiliation is probably a mistake, especially concerning the so-called Soviet and Yan'an factions. Defectors have often stated that the factional divisions were neither as clear-cut nor as meaningful in all cases as non-Communist sources alleged. Moreover, as a careful survey of this period reveals, increasingly the only meaningful faction was coming to be Kim Il-sung, and the crucial factor, one's personal relationship to Kim, irrespective of one's background. Nevertheless, there were differences in background, educational experience, and even culture that stemmed from the heterogeneous nature of the Korean revolutionary movement. And this did constitute a political problem, as the Korean Communists themselves readily admitted. While factionalism may not have been as important as some South Korean writers have indicated, and undoubtedly involved many more ambivalent and poorly defined factions, it remained a crucial issue in this period.") The 2nd CC, which consisted of 67 members and 20 alternate members, was divided along factional lines. Of the 67 members, 30 had served in the 1st Central Committee. Among those not reelected were Chon Song-hwa and Chong Tal-hyon from the domestic faction. The position of the partisan faction was strengthened, with Kang Kon, Kim Kwang-hyop, Kim Kyong-sok and Pak Kum-chol being elected to the 2nd Central Committee. Despite this, the domestic faction had the most representation on the 2nd CC. Further the 2nd CC reelected Yanan communist Kim Tu-bong as Chairman of the Central Committee while partisan Kim Il Sung and Chu Yong-ha from the domestic group were elected to the office of Vice Chairman. All the members of the 1st Political Committee were re-elected, while two new were added; Kim Chaek and Pak Il-u. Upon the merger of the Workers' Party of North Korea and the Workers' Party of South Korea (WPSK) on 24 June 1949, the 2nd Central Committee merged with the 1st WPSK Central Committee and gained 31 new members. The newly expanded 2nd CC elected Kim Il Sung as chairman and domestic communist Pak Hon-yong and Soviet Korean Ho Ka-i as vice chairmen. Also, Ho Ka-i with domestic communists (and former WPSK members) Yi Sung-yop and Kim Sam-yong were elected First, Second and Third Secretary respectively in charge of administrative affairs. Thirty-six individuals were re-elected to the 3rd Central Committee, of these 29 were original members of the WPNK's 2nd CC.

The first moves to purge the domestic faction from WPK political life began at the 5th Joint Plenary Session, held 15–18 December 1952. In his report to the plenum Kim Il Sung talked about defects in party work and accused certain people, without mentioning names, of lacking proper "Party character", forsaking the masses, not performing duties assigned to them and not criticising party policy through proper party channels. Shortly after the plenary session Yim Hwa was arrested for writing for anti-communist thinking for writing the following lines in a poem; "Forests were put to the fire; houses were burned. If Stalin comes to Korea, there is not a house to put him up for the night." Continuing up to December 1952 several other figures were arrested, such as Kim Nam-chon, Kim Ki-rim, Kim O-song and Kwon O-jik. Several others were secretly arrested as the purge was carried outside the public eye. On 15 February 1953 an editorial in Rodong Sinmun stated that, in line with the 5th Joint Plenary Session, certain factionalists had become a "target of our hatred". Mentioned by name was Yim Hwa, Chu Yong-ha, Kim Nam-chon and Cho Il-hae, but the editorial noted that there were "others" as well. They were charged with "not trusting the Party, and with slandering Party Policy and Party leadership." The editorial noted that the Party had been tolerant of their behaviour, but stated that when given the chance to apologise the accused did not admit their mistakes and/or gave half-hearted apologies. Chu Yong-ha, instead of apologising for his supposed misdeeds, openly criticised the leadership of the WPK. While no public criticism was aired at Pak Hon-yong at the time, he was not heard, seen in public or reported on since February 1953.

Around the same time, the Kim Il Sung group moved against WPK First Secretary Ho Ka-i, who under pressure either committed suicide or was murdered on 2 July 1953. The suicide was announced at the 6th Joint Plenary Session, held on 4–6 August 1953, as well as the expulsion from the party of Pak Hon-yong and other leading WPSK officials. During the plenum, on 3–6 August, a trial conducted by the Military Tribunal Department of the Supreme Court involving twelve defendants was organised. (Note: The following stood on trial in August 1953: Yi Sung-yop, former Minister of Justice and member of the WPSK Central Committee; Cho Il-myong, former Head of the Editorial Bureau of Haebang Ilbo and Vice Minister of Culture and Propaganda; Yim Hwa, a poet and former Vice Chairman of the Korean-Soviet Cultural Association's Central Committee; Pak Sung-won, former Deputy Director of the Central Committee Liaison Department; Yi Kang-guk, former Director of the Bureau of Foreign Affairs of the People's Committee of North Korea; Pae Chol, former Director of the Central Committee Liaison Department; Yun Sun-dal, former Deputy Director of the Central Committee Liaison Department; Yi Won-jo, former Vice Director of the Central Committee Propaganda and Agitation; Cho Yong-bok, former senior member of the People's Inspection Committee; Maeng Chong-ho, former Commander of the 10th Independent Branch Unit of the Korean People's Guerilla Corps, and; Sol Chong-sik, former member of Section 7 in the General Political Bureau of the Supreme Command of the Korean People's Army.) The defendants were accused of spying for the United States Government and infiltrating the North Korean Government and the WPK. Pak Hon-yong, as the ringleader of the alleged conspiracy, was accused of seeking to overthrow the North Korean government and the WPK leadership, and seeking to restore capitalism. Pak Hon-yong was not put on trial before 15 December 1955, in which he was trialled by a special session of the Supreme Court in which the judges were leading politicians of the WPK. He was accused of becoming "a traitor of the revolution" in 1939 and of "disguising himself as a patriot", and was executed for his supposed crimes on 18 December 1955. This supposed conspiracy helped explain North Korea's defeat in the Korean War, and further rationalise Kim Il Sung's growing dominance over the WPK and state machinery.

== Plenary sessions ==
Plenum	Start–end	Length	Agenda
1st Plenary Session	31 March 1948	1 day	1 item.: Elections of the Officers of the 2nd Central Committee.
2nd Plenary Session	12 July 1948	1 day	2 items.: On the work of party organisation before the election to the 1st Supreme People's Assembly.; On the promulgation of the Democratic People's Republic of Korea.
3rd Plenary Session	24–25 September 1948	2 days	3 items.: On party organisational tasks and the Supreme People's Assembly's election results.; Debate on the collection of textile tax and increased agricultural production of grains in 1949.; Concerning organisational matters: Election of Vice Chairman of the Party; Elections to the Standing Committee; Decision on establishing the Organisational Committee of the 2nd Central Committee; Election of members to the Organisational Committee; Election of the Chairman of the 2nd Auditing and 2nd Inspection commissions; General debate on the farewell ceremony for Soviet forces.
4th Plenary Session	9–14 December 1948	5 days	Not made public.
5th Plenary Session	12–13 February 1949	2 days	4 items.: On the strengthening of the party's leadership. Summation of the work of lower-level party organisations in the last nine months.; Debate on the party's tasks to realise economic reconstruction in the period 1949–50.; Debate on the party organisation report in the upcoming elections to the people's committees of provinces, cities, counties and districts.; Decision on establishing the Chagang Provincial Committee and lower-level organisations of the party in connection with the establishment of Chagang Province and its administrative structures.
6th Enlarged Plenary Session	11 June 1949	1 day	2 items.: Report by Kim Il-sung on the party's participation in the 1st Congress of the Democratic Front for the Reunification of the Fatherland.; Debate on establishing the Workers' Party of Korea by merging the Workers' Party of North Korea and the Workers' Party of South Korea.
1st Joint Plenary Session	24 June 1949	1 day	3 items.: Decision on forming the Workers' Party of Korea.; Election of Officers of the 2nd Central Committee.; Restructuring of the committees subordinate to the Central Committee.
2nd Joint Plenary Session	15–18 December 1949	3 days	3 items.: Concerning the party's revised policy in the industrial sector in connection with the Two-Year People's Economic Plan.; Report by Pak Hon-yong on the need to strengthen party ideological education of members.; Discussion on organisational problems.; Kim Il-sung hold a speech named "Let Us Be More Faithful to Marxism and Leninism and the Principles of Proletarian Internationalism".
3rd Joint Plenary Session	21–23 December 1950	3 days	3 items.: Report by Kim Il-sung, known as "The Present Situation and Our Tasks".; Problems arising from the unification of the workers' organisations of North and South Korea.; Debate on organisational problems.
4th Joint Plenary Session	1–4 November 1951	4 days	2 items.: Report by Kim Il-sung, known as "On Some Defects in the Organisation Work of Party Organisations".; On organisational problems: Election of Pak Chong-ae, who served as Secretary of the Central Committee, to the Political Committee.; Election of Pak Chang-ok as Secretary of the Central Committee.; Election of Pak Yong-bin as Chairman of the Organisational Section.; Election of Kim Chon-hae as Chairman of the Social Affairs Section.; The meeting concluded with Kim Il-sung's speech "On the Improvement of the Party's Organisational Work".
5th Joint Plenary Session	15–18 December 1952	4 days	2 items.: Report by Kim Il-sung, known as "The Organisational and Ideological Consolidation of the Party is the Basis of Our Victory".; Report by Pak Chong-ae, known as "Concerning the Problems of Organisation".
6th Joint Plenary Session	4–6 August 1953	3 days	3 items.: Report by Kim Il-sung, known as "Everything for the Postwar Rehabilitation and Development of the National Economy".; Report by Pak Chong-ae on recent anti-party and anti-state activities of Yi Sung-yop, Pae Chol, Pak Sung-won, Yun Sun-dal, Cho Il-myong Yi Kang-guk "and others", "and the incident of Ho Ka-i, who cowardly committed suicide after committing anti-people and anti-party activities".; On organisational problems: The following were expelled from the 2nd Central Committee: Chu Yong-ha, Chang Si-u, Pak Hon-yong, Kim O-song, An Ki-song, Kim Kwang-su and Kim Ung-bin. Alternate member Kwon O-jik is expelled as well; The following were expelled from the 2nd Central Committee for "not being faithful and sacrificial in their service to the party and state" during the war: Ku Chae-su, Yi Chon-jin, Cho Pok-ye and Yi Chu-sang; The following were elected to the 2nd Central Committee: Yi Yong-som, Hwang Tae-song, Pak Kyong-su, Yu Chuk-un and Yun Hyong-sik; The abolition of the Organisational Committee and the election of a new Standing Committee composed of: Kim Il-sung, Kim Tu-bong, Pak Chong-ae, Pak Yong-bin, Choe Won-taek, Choe Chang-ik, Jong Il-ryong, Kim Hwang-il, Kang Mun-sok, Kim Sung-hwa, Kim Kwang-hyop, Pak Kum-chol and Nam Il; The election of the following to the Political Committee: Kim Il-sung, Kim Tu-bong, Pak Chong-ae, Pak Chang-ok and Kim Il; Chang Sun-myong, the Chairman of the 2nd Inspection Commission, and Yi Ki-sok, the Vice Chairman of the 2nd Inspection Commission, are relieved of their duties and replaced by Kim Ung-gi as new Chairman.; Abolition of the Central Committee secretary system, and the election of Pak Chong-ae, Pak Chang-ok and Kim Il to the office of Vice Chairman of the Workers' Party of Korea; Election of the following members to the Committee on Revision of Party Rules: Kim Il-sung, Pak Chong-ae, Pak Chang-ok, Kim Il, Pak Yong-bin, Yi Ki-sok, Kim Kwang-hyop, Yi Kwon-mu, Han Sol-ya, Kang Mun-sok, Hwang Tae-song, Kim Yol, Ko Pong-gi, Kim Sung-hwa and Pak Kum-chol; The following were elected to positions within the Central Committee apparatus: Kim Chang-man as the Chairman of Propaganda and Agitation Section, Kim Min-san as the Chairman of Society Section and Yi Chong-won as the Chairman of the Social Science Section.
7th Joint Plenary Session	21–23 March 1954	3 days	2 items.: Report by Kim Il, known as "Concerning the Strengthening of the Work of the Democratic Front of the Fatherland Unification".; Report by Pak Chong-ae, known as "General Report on Every Party Leadership Organisation in the Coming Election, January-April 1954".
March Plenary Session	21–23 March 1954	3 days	2 items.: Report by Kim Il-sung, known as "The Present Task of the Party, State, Economic Organisation, and the Workers to Rectify New Shortcomings in Industry and Transportation Sectors".; Report by Kim Il-sung concerning organisational problems: Pak Yong-bin and Pak Kum-chol are elected to the office of Vice Chairman of the WPK Central Committee while Pak Chang-ok and Kim Il are relieved of their position as WPK vice chairmen.
November Plenary Session	1–3 April 1955	3 days	6 items.: Speech by Kim Il-sung, known as "On the Unification of Korea with the Correct Understanding of the Fatherland Unification".; Report by Kim Il, known as "Concerning the Future Policy of the Workers' Party of Korea to Struggle for the Rapid Reconstruction and Development of Agricultural Management".; General Report on the work of every party organisation in the election.; The restructuring off, and the election of twenty-five members to the Committee on Drafting the Party Platform.; Concerning party organisational problems.; Speech by Kim Il-sung, known as "On Our Party Policy for the Further Development of Agricultural Management".
April Plenary Session	1–4 December 1955	4 days	5 items.: Report by Kim Il-sung, known as "On Further Intensifying the Class Education of Party Members".; Report by Kim Il-sung, known as "On the Elimination of Bureaucratism of Some Workers in the Party and the Government".; Report by Pak Chang-ok, known as "On the Strengthening of the Struggle for Economic Thrift Rules for Financial and Material Statistics, Anti-corruption and Anti-waste".; Debate on the problems of party discipline.; Concluding remarks by Kim Il-sung, known as "On Some Questions of Party and State Work in the Present Stage of the Socialist Revolution".
December Plenary Session	2–3 December 1955	2 days	3 items.: Concerning the decisions made at the November Plenary Session on the development of agriculture.; Concerning the convocation of the 3rd Party Congress; Decision on holding the congress in April 1956; Decision on the Agenda of the 3rd Party Congress: 1. Report on the work of the 2nd Central Committee, presented by Kim Il-sung; 2. Report on the work of the 2nd Central Auditing Commission, presented by Yi Chu-yon; 3. Report on the work of the Bylaw Revision Committee, presented by Pak Chong-ae; 4. Election of the 3rd Central Committee and the 3rd Central Auditing Commission; Debate on the party's organisational problems.

== Members ==
=== 1st Plenary Session (1946–49) ===
==== Full ====
Rank	Name Hangul	Level of government (Offices held)	1st CC	3rd CC	Inner-composition				Background
Rank	Name Hangul	Level of government (Offices held)	1st CC	3rd CC	2nd POC	2nd STC	2nd ORG	2nd INS	Background
1	Kim Tu-bong	Central: Chairman of the WPNK Central Committee (1946–49); Chairman of the 1st Standing Committee of the 1st Supreme People's Assembly	Old	Reelected	Chairman	Chairman	—	—	Yanan
2	Kim Il Sung	Central: Premier of the Cabinet; Vice Chairman of the WPNK Central Committee	Old	Reelected	Member	Member	Member	—	Partisan
3	Ho Ka-i	Central: Vice Chairman of the WPK Central Committee	Old	Demoted	Member	Member	Member	—	Soviet
4	Chu Yong-ha	Central: Minister of Transportation (September – October 1948)	Old	Expelled	Member	Member	—	—	Domestic
5	Kim Chaek	Central: Vice Premier of the Cabinet (1948–49); Minister of Industry (1948–49)	Old	Demoted	Member	Member	—	—	Partisan
6	Choe Chang-ik	Central: Minister of Finance	Old	Reelected	Member	Member	—	—	Yanan
7	Pak Il-u	Central: Minister of Interior	Old	Demoted	Member	Member	—	—	Yanan
8	Pak Chong-ae	Central: Member of the 1st Standing Committee of the 1st Supreme People's Assembly	Old	Reelected	—	Member	Member	—	Domestic
9	Kim Kyo-yong	—	Old	Demoted	—	—	—	—	Partisan
10	Chong Chun-taek	Central: Minister of Chemical Industry (1955–56); Chairman of the State Planning Commission	New	Reelected	—	Member	—	—	Partisan
11	Pak Chang-ok	—	New	Reelected	—	Member	—	—	Soviet
12	Kim Il	Central: Minister of Agriculture (1954–56)	Old	Reelected	—	Member	—	—	Partisan
13	Kim Chae-uk	—	Old	Demoted	—	Member	—	—	Soviet
14	Kim Hwang-il	—	New	Reelected	—	—	—	—	Domestic
15	Kim Yol	—	Old	Demoted	—	Member	Member	—	Soviet
16	Choe Kyong-dok	Central: Member of the 1st Standing Committee of the 1st Supreme People's Assembly	Old	Demoted	—	—	—	—	Domestic
17	Kim Min-san	—	Old	Demoted	—	—	—	—	Yanan
18	Choe Suk-yang	—	Old	Demoted	—	—	—	—	—
19	Chin Pan-su	—	New	Reelected	—	Member	—	—	Soviet
20	Kang Chin-gon	Central: Member of the 1st Standing Committee of the 1st Supreme People's Assembly	Old	Reelected	—	—	—	—	Domestic
21	Han Il-mu	—	Old	Reelected	—	—	—	—	Soviet
22	Pak Hun-il	—	Old	Reelected	—	—	—	—	Yanan
23	Choe Chae-rin	—	New	Demoted	—	—	—	—	Partisan
24	Han Sol-ya	—	Old	Reelected	—	—	—	—	Domestic
25	Yi Hui-jun	—	New	Demoted	—	—	—	—	Soviet
26	Kang Kon	—	New	Demoted	—	—	—	—	Partisan
27	Kim Sung-hwa	—	New	Demoted	—	—	—	—	Soviet
28	Ki Sok-bok	Central: Editor-in-chief of Kulloja	New	Demoted	—	Member	—	—	Soviet
29	Ho Chong-suk	Central: Minister of Culture and Propaganda	New	Reelected	—	—	—	—	Yanan
30	Yi Chung-gun	—	New	Demoted	—	—	—	—	Domestic
31	Tae Song-su	—	Old	Demoted	—	—	—	—	Soviet
32	Chang Sun-myong	Central: Chairman of the WPNK Inspection Commission; Member of the 1st Standing Committee of the 1st Supreme People's Assembly	Old	Demoted	—	—	—	Chairman	Soviet
33	Kim Ung-gi	—	New	Reelected	—	—	—	—	Domestic
34	Kim Ko-mang	—	New	Demoted	—	—	—	Member	Domestic
35	Mu Chong	—	Old	Demoted	—	—	—	—	Yanan
36	Pak Chang-sik	—	New	Demoted	—	—	—	—	Soviet
37	Yi Puk-myong	—	New	Demoted	—	—	—	—	Domestic
38	Pak Hyo-sam	—	Old	Demoted	—	—	—	—	Yanan
39	Kim Sang-chol	—	New	Reelected	—	—	—	—	Domestic
40	Chang Si-u	Central: Minister of Commerce	Old	Expelled	—	—	—	—	Domestic
41	Chong Tu-hyon	—	Old	Demoted	—	—	—	—	Domestic
42	O Ki-sop	—	Old	Reelected	—	—	—	—	Domestic
43	Song Che-jun	—	Old	Demoted	—	—	—	—	—
44	Kim Chik-hyong	—	New	Reelected	—	—	—	—	Domestic
45	Yi Sun-gun	—	Old	Demoted	—	—	—	—	Domestic
46	Kim Kwang-hyop	—	New	Reelected	—	—	—	—	Partisan
47	Yi Chong-ik	—	Old	Demoted	—	—	—	Member	Domestic
48	Chang Hae-u	—	New	Demoted	—	—	—	Member	Domestic
49	Yi Tong-hwa	—	New	Demoted	—	—	—	—	Soviet
50	Yim Hae	—	Old	Reelected	—	—	—	—	Partisan
51	Jong Il-ryong	—	New	Reelected	—	Member	—	—	Domestic
52	Pang Hak-se	—	New	Reelected	—	—	—	Member	Soviet
53	Cho Yong	—	New	Reelected	—	—	—	—	Yanan
54	Kim Ung	—	New	Reelected	—	—	—	—	Soviet
55	Pak Mu	—	New	Reelected	—	—	—	—	Yanan
56	Kim Yong-su	—	New	Demoted	—	—	—	—	Soviet
57	Chang Chol	—	New	Demoted	—	—	—	Member	Yanan
58	Kim Tae-ryon	—	New	Demoted	—	—	—	—	—
59	Yi Kwon-mu	—	New	Reelected	—	—	—	—	Yanan
60	Kim Kyong-sok	—	New	Reelected	—	—	—	—	Partisan
61	Kim Han-jung	—	New	Demoted	—	—	—	—	Yanan
62	Pak Yong-son	—	New	Demoted	—	Member	Member	—	Domestic
63	Ri Yu-min	Central: Vice Chairman of the 1st Supreme People's Assembly (1953–56)	New	Reelected	—	—	—	—	Yanan
64	Kim Kwang-bin	—	New	Demoted	—	—	—	—	—
65	Yi Song-un	—	New	Reelected	—	—	—	—	Partisan
66	Pak Kum-chol	—	New	Reelected	—	—	—	—	Partisan
67	Kim Chan	—	New	Demoted	—	—	—	—	Soviet

==== Alternates ====
Rank	Name Hangul	1st CC	3rd CC	Background					
Rank	Name Hangul	1st CC	3rd CC	Background	1	Pak Won-sul	New	Demoted	—
2	Yi Yong-hwa	New	Demoted	—					
3	Kim Chin-yo	New	Demoted	—					
4	Chae Kyu-hong	New	Demoted	—					
5	Han Ang-chon	New	Full	Yanan					
6	Pak Yong-hwa	New	Demoted	—					
7	Pak Tong-cho	New	Demoted	—					
8	Kang Yong-chang	New	Full	Domestic					
9	Choe Kwang-yol	New	Demoted	Yanan					
10	Yi Kyu-hwan	New	Reelected	—					
11	Nam Il	New	Full	—					
12	Chang Wi-sam	New	Demoted	Soviet					
13	Ko Pong-gi	New	Full	—					
14	Kim Tae-hwa	New	Demoted	—					
15	Kye Tong-son	New	Demoted	—					
16	Kim Tu-yong	New	Demoted	—					
17	Yi Hyo-sun	New	Full	Partisan					
18	Yi Chi-chan	New	Reelected	—					
19	Yi Yong-som	New	Demoted	—					
20	Choe Pong-su	New	Demoted	Soviet					

=== 1st Joint Plenary Session (1949–56) ===
Name Hangul	Level of government (Offices held)	1st CC	3rd CC	Inner-composition					Background
Name Hangul	Level of government (Offices held)	1st CC	3rd CC	2nd POC	2nd STC	2nd SEC	2nd ORG	2nd INS	Background
An Ki-song	—	WPSK	Expelled	—	—	—	—	—	Domestic
Chang Chol	—	New	Demoted	—	—	—	—	Member	Yanan
Chang Hae-u	—	New	Demoted	—	—	—	—	Member	Domestic
Chang Si-u	Central: Minister of Commerce (1949–52)	Old	Expelled	—	—	—	—	—	Domestic
Chang Sun-myong	Central: Chairman of the WPK Inspection Commission (1949–53); Member of the 1st Standing Committee of the 1st Supreme People's Assembly (1949–53)	Old	Demoted	—	—	—	—	Chairman	Soviet
Chin Pan-su	Central: Minister of Foreign Trade (1953–56)	New	Reelected	—	—	—	—	—	Soviet
Cho Pok-ye	—	New	Expelled	—	—	—	—	—	—
Cho Yong	—	New	Reelected	—	—	—	—	—	Yanan
Choe Chae-rin	—	New	Demoted	—	—	—	—	—	Partisan
Choe Chang-ik	Central: Minister of State Control (January – August 1955); Vice Premier of the Cabinet (1952–56); Minister of Finance (1949–52)	Old	Reelected	—	Member	—	Member	—	Yanan
Choe Kyong-dok	Central: Member of the 1st Standing Committee of the 1st Supreme People's Assembly (1949–53)	Old	Demoted	—	—	—	—	—	Domestic
Choe Suk-yang	—	Old	Demoted	—	—	—	—	—	—
Choe Won-taek	Central: Member of the 1st Standing Committee of the 1st Supreme People's Assembly (1953–56)	New	Reelected	—	Member	—	—	—	Partisan
Chong Chun-taek	Central: Minister of Chemical and Building Materials Industries (1954–55); Chairman of the State Planning Commission (1949–54)	New	Reelected	—	—	—	—	—	Partisan
Chong Il-yong	Central: Minister of Heavy Industry (1951–52 & 54–55); Minister of Industry (February – July 1951)	New	Reelected	—	Member	—	—	—	Domestic
Chong No-sik	—	WPSK	Demoted	—	—	—	—	—	Domestic
Chong Tu-hyon	—	Old	Demoted	—	—	—	—	—	Partisan
Chong Yun	—	WPSK	Demoted	—	—	—	—	—	Domestic
Chu Yong-ha	—	Old	Expelled	—	—	—	—	—	Domestic
Han Il-mu	—	Old	Reelected	—	—	—	—	—	Soviet
Han Sol-ya	—	Old	Reelected	—	—	—	—	—	Domestic
Ho Chong-suk	Central: Minister of Culture and Propaganda	New	Reelected	—	—	—	—	—	Yanan
Ho Hon	Central: Chairman of the 1st Supreme People's Assembly (1948–51)	WPSK	Died	Member	—	—	Member	—	Domestic
Ho Ka-i	Central: Vice Premier of the Cabinet (1951–53); Vice Chairman of the WPK Central Committee (1949–53)	Old	Died	V. Chairman	V. Chairman	1. Secretary	Member	—	Soviet
Ho Song-taek	Central: Minister of Labour (1949–52)	WPSK	Reelected	—	—	—	—	—	Domestic
Hong Nam-pyo	Central: Vice Chairman of the 1st Standing Committee of the 1st Supreme People's Assembly (1949–53)	WPSK	Demoted	—	—	—	—	—	Domestic
Hwang Tae-song	—	New	Demoted	—	—	—	—	—	—
Hyon U-hyon	—	WPSK	Demoted	—	—	—	—	—	Domestic
Kang Chin-gon	Central: Member of the 1st Standing Committee of the 1st Supreme People's Assembly	Old	Reelected	—	—	—	—	—	Domestic
Kang Kon	—	New	Demoted	—	—	—	—	—	Partisan
Kang Mun-sok	—	WPSK	Demoted	—	Member	—	—	—	Domestic
Ki Sok-bok	Central: Editor-in-chief of Kulloja	New	Demoted	—	—	—	—	—	Soviet
Kim Chae-uk	—	Old	Demoted	—	—	—	—	—	Soviet
Kim Chaek	Central: Vice Premier of the Cabinet (1949–51); Minister of Industry (1949–51)	Old	Died	Member	—	—	Member	—	Partisan
Kim Chan	—	New	Demoted	—	—	—	—	—	Soviet
Kim Chik-hyong	—	New	Reelected	—	—	—	—	—	Domestic
Kim Chin-guk	—	WPSK	Demoted	—	—	—	—	—	Domestic
Kim Han-jung	—	New	Demoted	—	—	—	—	—	Yanan
Kim Hwang-il	—	New	Reelected	—	Member	—	—	—	Domestic
Kim Il	Central: Vice Premier of the Cabinet (1954–56); Vice Chairman of the WPNK Central Committee (1953–56)	Old	Reelected	V. Chairman	V. Chairman	—	—	—	Partisan
Kim Il Sung	Central: Chairman of the WPK Central Committee; Premier of the Cabinet	Old	Reelected	Chairman	Chairman	—	Member	—	Partisan
Kim Ko-mang	—	New	Demoted	—	—	—	—	Member	Domestic
Kim Kwang-bin	—	New	Demoted	—	—	—	—	—	—
Kim Kwang-hyop	—	New	Reelected	—	Member	—	—	—	Partisan
Kim Kwang-su	—	WPSK	Expelled	—	—	—	—	—	Domestic
Kim Kye-rim	—	WPSK	Demoted	—	—	—	—	—	Domestic
Kim Kyo-yong	—	Old	Demoted	—	—	—	—	—	Partisan
Kim Kyong-sok	—	New	Reelected	—	—	—	—	—	Partisan
Kim Min-san	—	Old	Demoted	—	—	—	—	—	Yanan
Kim O-song	—	WPSK	Expelled	—	—	—	—	—	Domestic
Kim Sam-yong	—	WPSK	Died	Member	—	3. Secretary	Member	—	Domestic
Kim Sang-chol	—	New	Reelected	—	—	—	—	—	Domestic
Kim Sang-hyok	—	WPSK	Reelected	—	—	—	—	—	Domestic
Kim Sung-hwa	Central: Minister of Construction (1955–56); Minister of City Construction (1951–53)	New	Demoted	—	Member	—	—	—	Soviet
Kim Tae-jun	—	WPSK	Demoted	—	—	—	—	—	Domestic
Kim Tae-ryon	—	New	Demoted	—	—	—	—	—	—
Kim Tu-bong	Central: Chairman of the 1st Standing Committee 1st Supreme People's Assembly	Old	Reelected	Member	—	—	Member	—	Yanan
Kim Ung	—	New	Reelected	—	—	—	—	—	Soviet
Kim Ung-bin	—	WPSK	Expelled	—	—	—	—	—	Domestic
Kim Ung-gi	Central: Chairman of the Inspection Commission (1953–56); Chairman of the 1st Standing Committee of the 1st Supreme People's Assembly (1953–56)	New	Reelected	—	—	—	—	Chairman	Domestic
Kim Yol	—	Old	Demoted	—	—	—	Member	—	Soviet
Kim Yong-am	—	WPSK	Demoted	—	—	—	—	—	Domestic
Kim Yong-jae	—	WPSK	Demoted	—	—	—	—	—	Domestic
Kim Yong-su	—	New	Demoted	—	—	—	—	—	Soviet
Ko Chan-bo	—	WPSK	Demoted	—	—	—	—	—	Domestic
Ku Chae-su	Central: Member of the 1st Standing Committee of the 1st Supreme People's Assembly (1949–53)	WPSK	Expelled	—	—	—	—	—	Domestic
Mu Chong	—	Old	Expelled	—	—	—	—	—	Yanan
Nam Il	Central: Minister of Foreign Affairs (1953–56)	New	Reelected	—	Member	—	—	—	Soviet
O Ki-sop	—	Old	Reelected	—	—	—	—	—	Domestic
Pak Chang-ok	Central: Chairman of the State Planning Commission; Vice Chairman of the WPNK Central Committee (1953–56)	New	Reelected	V. Chairman	V. Chairman	—	—	—	Soviet
Pak Chong-ae	Central: Vice Chairman of the WPNK Central Committee (1953–56); Member of the 1st Standing Committee of the 1st Supreme People's Assembly	Old	Reelected	V. Chairman	V. Chairman	—	—	—	Domestic
Pak Chang-sik	—	New	Demoted	—	—	—	—	—	Soviet
Pak Hon-yong	Central: Vice Chairman of the WPK Central Committee (1949–53); Vice Premier of the Cabinet (1949–53); Minister of Foreign Affairs (1949–53)	WPSK	Expelled	V. Chairman	V. Chairman	—	Member	—	Domestic
Pak Hun-il	—	Old	Reelected	—	—	—	—	—	Yanan
Pak Hyo-sam	—	Old	Demoted	—	—	—	—	—	Yanan
Pak Il-u	Central: Ministet of Post and Telecommunications (1953–55); Minister of Interior (1949–52)	Old	Expelled	Member	—	—	Member	—	Yanan
Pak Kum-chol	Central: Vice Chairman of the WPNK Central Committee (1953–56)	New	Reelected	V. Chairman	V. Chairman	—	—	—	Partisan
Pak Kyong-su	—	New	Demoted	—	—	—	—	—	—
Pak Mu	—	New	Reelected	—	—	—	—	—	Yanan
Pak Mun-gyu	Central: Minister of Agriculture (1952–54); Minister of Agriculture and Forestry (1949–52)	WPSK	Reelected	—	—	—	—	—	Domestic
Pak Yong-bin	Central: Vice Chairman of the WPNK Central Committee (1953–56)	New	Demoted	V. Chairman	V. Chairman	—	—	—	Soviet
Pak Yong-son	—	New	Demoted	—	—	—	—	—	Domestic
Pang Hak-se	Central: Minister of Interior (1952–56); Minister of Public Security (1951–52)	New	Reelected	—	—	—	—	Member	Soviet
Song Che-jun	—	Old	Demoted	—	—	—	—	—	—
Song Ul-su	—	WPSK	Reelected	—	—	—	—	—	Domestic
Song Yu-gyong	—	WPSK	Demoted	—	—	—	—	—	Domestic
Tae Song-su	—	Old	Demoted	—	—	—	—	—	Soviet
Yi Chae-nam	—	WPSK	Demoted	—	—	—	—	—	Domestic
Yi Chon-jin	—	WPSK	Expelled	—	—	—	—	—	Domestic
Yi Chong-ik	—	Old	Demoted	—	—	—	—	Member	Domestic
Yi Chu-ha	—	WPSK	Demoted	—	—	—	—	—	Domestic
Yi Chu-sang	—	New	Expelled	—	—	—	—	—	—
Yi Chung-gun	—	New	Demoted	—	—	—	—	—	Domestic
Yi Hui-jun	—	New	Demoted	—	—	—	—	—	—
Yi Hyon-sang	—	WPSK	Demoted	—	—	—	—	—	Domestic
Yi Ki-sok	Central: Minister of City Management (1955–56); Chairman of the People's Control Commission; Vice Chairman of the Inspection Commission (1949–53); Member of the 1st Standing Committee of the 1st Supreme People's Assembly	WPSK	Demoted	—	—	—	—	V. Chairman	Domestic
Yi Kwon-mu	—	New	Reelected	—	—	—	—	—	Yanan
Yi Puk-myong	—	New	Demoted	—	—	—	—	—	Domestic
Yi Song-un	—	New	Reelected	—	—	—	—	—	Partisan
Yi Sun-gun	—	Old	Demoted	—	—	—	—	—	Domestic
Yi Sung-yop	Central: Chairman of the People's Control Commission (1952–53); Minister of Justice	WPSK	Expelled	Member	—	2. Secretary	Member	—	Domestic
Yi Tong-hwa	—	New	Demoted	—	—	—	—	—	Soviet
Yi Yong-som	—	New	Demoted	—	—	—	—	—	—
Ri Yu-min	—	New	Reelected	—	—	—	—	—	Yanan
Yim Hae	—	Old	Reelected	—	—	—	—	—	Partisan
Yu Chuk-un	—	New	Demoted	—	—	—	—	—	—
Yu Yong-jun	Central: Member of the 1st Standing Committee of the 1st Supreme People's Assembly	WPSK	Demoted	—	—	—	—	—	Domestic
Yun Hyong-sik	—	New	Demoted	—	—	—	—	—	—
