= 2nd Political Committee of the Workers' Party of Korea =

The 2nd Political Committee of the Workers' Party of Korea (WPK), officially the Political Committee of the 2nd Central Committee (2nd CC), was elected in the immediate aftermath of the 2nd WPK Congress on 30 March 1948 by the 2nd CC's 1st Plenary Session. The composition changed on the merger of the Workers' Party of North Korea and the Workers' Party of South Korea (WPSK) on 24 June 1953, and was again changed after a purge of WPSK-affiliated communists on 6 August 1953.

It sat until the 3rd Congress, which abolished the Political Committee and elected the 3rd Standing Committee in its place.

== 1st Plenary Session (1948–49) ==
Rank	Name	Hangul	Government posts	1st POL	1949	Faction
1	Kim Tu-bong	김두봉	Central: Chairman of the WPNK Central Committee	Old	Reelected	Yanan
2	Kim Il Sung	김일성	Central: Vice Chairman of the WPNK Central Committee	Old	Reelected	Partisan
3	Ho Ka-i	허가이	Central: Vice Chairman of the WPNK Central Committee	Old	Reelected	Soviet
4	Kim Chaek	김책	—	New	Reelected	Partisan
5	Choe Chang-ik	최창익	—	Old	Demoted	Yanan
6	Pak Il-u	최창익	—	New	Reelected	Yanan
7	Chu Yong-ha	주영하	—	Old	Demoted	Domestic

== 1st Joint Plenary Session (1949–53) ==
Note that Pak Chong-ae was elected to the 2nd Political Committee on 4 November 1951 by the 4th Joint Plenary Session of the 2nd Central Committee.

Rank	Name	Hangul	Government posts	1948	1953	Faction
1	Kim Il Sung	김일성	Central: Chairman of the WPK Central Committee	Old	Reelected	Partisan
2	Pak Hon-yong	박헌영	Central: Vice Chairman of the WPK Central Committee	WPSK	Expelled	Domestic
3	Kim Chaek	김책	—	Old	Killed	Partisan
4	Pak Il-u	최창익	—	Old	Expelled	Yanan
5	Ho Ka-i	허가이	Central: First Secretary of the WPK Central Committee; Vice Chairman of the WPK Central Committee	Old	Suicide	Soviet
6	Yi Sung-yop	이성엽	Central: Second Secretary of the WPK Central Committee	WPSK	Expelled	Domestic
7	Kim Sam-yong	김삼룡	Central: Third Secretary of the WPK Central Committee	WPSK	Expelled	Domestic
8	Kim Tu-bong	김두봉	—	Old	Reelected	Yanan
9	Ho Hon	허헌	—	WPSK	Died	Domestic
10	Pak Chong-ae	박정애	—	New	Reelected	Soviet

== 6th Joint Plenary Session (1953–56) ==
Rank	Name	Hangul	Government posts	1953	3rd STC	Faction
1	Kim Il Sung	김일성	Central: Chairman of the WPK Central Committee	Old	Reelected	Partisan
2	Kim Tu-bong	김두봉	—	Old	Reelected	Yanan
3	Pak Chong-ae	박정애	Central: Vice Chairman of the WPK Central Committee	Old	Reelected	Soviet
4	Pak Chang-ok	박창옥	Central: Vice Chairman of the WPK Central Committee	New	Demoted	Soviet
5	Kim Il	김일	Central: Vice Chairman of the WPK Central Committee	New	Reelected	Partisan
