= 1st Central Committee of the Workers' Party of North Korea =

1st Central Committee
- Flag of the Workers' Party of North Korea

30 August 1946 – 30 March 1948 (1 year, 213 days) Overview
- Type: Central Committee of the Workers' Party of North Korea
- Election: 1st Congress (1946)

Leadership
- Chairman: Kim Tu-bong
- Vice Chairmen: Kim Il Sung; Chu Yong-ha; Ho Ka-i
- Political Committee: 5 members
- Standing Committee: 13 members

Members
- Total: 43

The 1st Central Committee of the Workers' Party of North Korea (WPNK) (Korean: 1차 북조선로동당중앙위원회) was elected by the 1st Congress on 30 August 1946 through the merger of the Communist Party of North Korea and the New People's Party of Korea, and remained in session until the election of the 2nd Central Committee on 30 March 1948. In between party congresses and specially convened conferences the Central Committee is the highest decision-making institution in the party and North Korea. The 1st Central Committee was not a permanent institution and delegated day-to-day work to elected central guidance bodies, such as the Political Committee, the Standing Committee and the Organisation Committee (membership not disclosed). It convened meetings, known as Plenary Sessions of the 1st Central Committee, to discuss major policies. A plenary session could be attended by non-members. These meetings are known as Enlarged Plenary Sessions. The party rules approved at the 1st Congress stipulated that the Central Committee needed to convene for a plenary session every third month. In total, the 1st Central Committee convened for twelve plenary sessions, of which eight were convened in 1947.

Forty-three members were elected to the 1st Central Committee, of which thirty-one were re-elected at the 2nd Congress. Its members convened for the 1st Plenary Session on 31 August 1946 and elected the 1st Organisation Committee, 1st Standing Committee and the 1st Political Committee, and voted in Kim Tu-bong as the WPNK Chairman and Kim Il Sung and Chu Yong-ha were elected vice chairmen. Despite their formal roles, real powers remained in Kim Il Sung's hands, and Kim Tu-bong played a more ceremonial role due to his unwillingness to partake in the day-to-day management of party affairs. In the 1st Plenary Session's aftermath, the party began establishing state structures known as provisional people's committees throughout the country, and in 1947 national elections to the People's Assembly was organised. At its first plenary session, the assembly elected a Presidium and designated Kim Tu-bong as its chairman and appointed the People's Committee (the government) and elected Kim Il Sung as its chairman. Of twenty-two government members, sixteen were members of the WPNK.

A feature of early North Korean politics was its factionalism. Four loosely defined factions had taken shape by this time; Kim Il Sung's partisans, domestic communists, the Yanan group and the Soviet Koreans. (Note: While a hallmark of early North Korean politics is factionalism, scholars Scalapino and Lee note that "To place too much emphasis upon factional affiliation is probably a mistake, especially concerning the so-called Soviet and Yan'an factions. Defectors have often stated that the factional divisions were neither as clear-cut nor as meaningful in all cases as non-Communist sources alleged. Moreover, as a careful survey of this period reveals, increasingly the only meaningful faction was coming to be Kim Il Sung. The crucial factor was one's relationship to Kim, irrespective of background. Nevertheless, there were differences in background, educational experience, and even culture that stemmed from the heterogeneous nature of the Korean revolutionary movement. And this did constitute a political problem, as the Korean Communists readily admitted. While factionalism may not have been as important as some South Korean writers have indicated, and undoubtedly involved many more ambivalent and poorly defined factions, it remained a crucial issue in this period.") The partisans, comprising soldiers who had fought Japanese rule with Kim Il Sung, lacked both theoretical and organisational experience to take leading party offices. They were therefore poorly represented in the 1st Central Committee. The domestic faction, composed of indigenous communists and leading members of the Workers' Party of South Korea, were underrepresented due to their underground activities in South Korea. Korean revolutionaries based in China during Japanese rule, known as the Yanan faction, had the most representation on the committee. The Soviet Koreans, composed of Koreans who were either Soviet-born or lived there during Japanese rule, also had significant representation. The conflict between these factions would intensify over the years, with Soviet Korean Yu Song-gol stating that he "as early as 1947 ... overheard how former partisans not only mentioned the [Yanans] and 'Soviets' with a great deal of animosity but also expressed the desire to be rid of them in due course." These factional conflicts were rarely based on policy differences but rather on personal interests and the struggle for power. Scholar Andrey Lankov notes that "at least [twenty-eight] members" of the 1st Central Committee "became victims of Kim Il Sung's purges. The real number was probably even higher since, in many cases, purges were not made public."

A conflict between Kim Il Sung's partisan faction and Pak Hon-yong's domestic faction had been brewing since the North Korean Branch Bureau's formation in October 1945. The leading domestic communist in the North, O Ki-sop, was accused of making "leftist and rightist errors" at the 3rd Enlarged Plenary Session. Vice Chairman Chu Yong-ha further elaborated on the criticism and claimed that "O had attempted to apply labour union principles under capitalism to the socialist setting of North Korea, thereby deliberately inciting unthinking workers." O Ki-sop defended himself by citing the works of Vladimir Lenin and claimed that "[if I am such] a pain in the neck then why not just pin the label of Trotskyite on [me]?" While Pak Il-u supposedly rose in his defence and called for a committee to study the Lenin work in question, Kim Il Sung stated that no such committee was necessary due to O Ki-sop's past mistakes. The criticism of O Ki-sop and the attacks on the indigenous North Korean communist movement that had remained active in Korea during Japanese colonialism were supported by the partisans, Soviet Koreans and the Yanans.

== Plenary sessions ==
Plenary sessions of the 1st Central Committee
Plenum	Date	Length	Agenda
1st Plenary Session	31 August 1946	1 day	1. Elections of the officers and apparatus heads of the 1st Central Committee.
2nd Enlarged Plenary Session	25 September 1946	1 day	1. Report by Kim Il Sung on the election to the People's Committee.
3rd Enlarged Plenary Session	25 November 1946	1 day	1. Debate on the party's present tasks.; 2. Debate on the elections held on 3 November.; 3. Concerning the strengthening of the party's organisation and political educational projects.
4th Enlarged Plenary Session	2 February 1947	1 day	1. Debate on the election of the people's committees at the myon and ri administrative levels.
5th Plenary Session	Not made public	Not made public	Not made public
6th Enlarged Plenary Session	15 March 1947	1 day	1. Report by Kim Il Sung on party work to realise economic reconstruction and development.; 2. Debate on the party's duty to strengthen the people's rights.; 3. Report concerning the grave errors of some party organisations in some party projects.
7th Enlarged Plenary Session	16 June 1947	1 day	1. Debate on participating in and cooperating with the US–Soviet Joint Commission on Korea on establishing an interim Korean government.; 2. Election of a representative to the US–Soviet Joint Commission.; 1. Kim Il Sung was elected the Representative to the US–Soviet Joint Commission; 3. Election of an ad hoc committee to respond to the US–Soviet Joint Commission's questionnaires.
8th Plenary Session	1 July 1947	1 day	1. Debate on the US–Soviet Joint Commission on Korea resolutions.; 2. Approving the reply on Article 5 and Article 6 in the "Organizations of the Interim Government" of the US–Soviet Joint Commission.
9th Plenary Session	Not made public	Not made public	Not made public
10th Plenary Session	13 September 1947	1 day	1. Discussion on the role of the party leadership in projects of the mass organisations.
11th Plenary Session	23 December 1947	1 day	1. On projects concerning every party leading organ.; 2. Discussion on the gathering of the 2nd Congress.; 3. Election of a bylaw draft committee to amend the party platform and rules.; 4. Concerning the policy of realising the first and fourth periods of the 1948 economic plan.; 5. Concerning organisational problems.
12th Plenary Session	9 February 1948	1 day	1. Report by Kim Il Sung on every party organisation's responsibility to realise the 1948 economic plan.; 2. Debate on the draft of the interim constitution of Korea.; 3. Debate on postponing the 2nd Congress.

== Members ==
Members of the 1st Central Committee
Rank	Name	Korean	2nd CC	Inner-composition		Background
Rank	Name	Korean	2nd CC	1st POC	1st STC	Background
1	Kim Tu-bong	김두봉	Reelected	Member	Member	Yanan
2	Kim Il Sung	김일성	Reelected	Member	Member	Partisan
3	Chu Yong-ha	주영하	Reelected	Member	Member	Domestic
4	Choe Chang-ik	최창익	Reelected	Member	Member	Yanan
5	Ho Ka-i	허가이	Reelected	Member	Member	Soviet
6	Kim Chang-man	김창만	Not	—	Member	Yanan
7	Ho Jong-suk	허정숙	Reelected	—	—	Yanan
8	Kim Yong-tae	김용태	Not	—	—	Domestic
9	Pak Chang-sik	박창식	Reelected	—	Member	Soviet
10	Pak Chong-ae	박정애	Reelected	—	Member	Domestic
11	Kim Chaek	김책	Reelected	—	Member	Partisan
12	Mu Chuong	무정	Reelected	—	—	Yanan
13	Yi Chun-am	이춘암	Not	—	—	Yanan
14	An Kil	안길	Died	—	—	Partisan
15	Kim Ye-pil	김예필	Not	—	—	Yanan
16	Kim Il	김일	Reelected	—	Member	Partisan
17	Pak Hyo-sam	박효삼	Reelected	—	Member	Yanan
18	Chang Sun-myong	장선명	Reelected	—	—	Soviet
19	Kim Yol	김열	Reelected	—	—	Soviet
20	Kim Chae-uk	김채욱	Reelected	—	Member	Soviet
21	Yun Kong-hum	윤공흠	Not	—	—	Yan'an
22	Han Il-mu	한일무	Reelected	—	—	Soviet
23	Tae Song-su	태성수	Reelected	—	—	Soviet
24	Han Sol-ya	한설야	Reelected	—	—	Soviet
25	Choe Kyong-dok	최경덕	Reelected	—	—	Domestic
26	Kang Chin-gon	강진곤	Reelected	—	—	Domestic
27	Chang Si-u	장시우	Reelected	—	—	Domestic
28	Chong Tu-hyon	정두현	Reelected	—	—	Domestic
29	Yim To-jun	임도준	Not	—	—	—
30	Yim Hae	임해	Reelected	—	—	Partisan
31	O Ki-sop	오기섭	Reelected	—	—	Domestic
32	Kim Uk-chin	김욱진	Not	—	—	Domestic
33	Yi Sun-gun	이순금	Reelected	—	—	Domestic
34	Kim Kyo-yong	김교용	Reelected	—	—	Partisan
35	Myong Hi-jo	명희조	Not	—	—	Yanan
36	Han Pin	한빈	Not	—	—	Yanan
37	Yi Chong-ik	이종익	Reelected	—	—	—
38	Chon Song-hwa	전송화	Not	—	—	Soviet
39	Kim Wol-song	김월송	Not	—	—	Domestic
40	Chang Chong-sik	장종식	Not	—	—	Domestic
41	Kim Min-san	김민산	Reelected	—	—	—
42	Pak Hun-il	박헌일	Reelected	—	—	Yanan
43	Pak Il-u	박일우	Reelected	—	Member	Yanan
