= 2nd Standing Committee of the Workers' Party of Korea =

The 2nd Standing Committee of the Workers' Party of Korea (WPK), officially the Standing Committee of the 2nd Central Committee (2nd CC), was elected in the immediate aftermath of the 2nd WPK Congress on 30 March 1948 by the 2nd CC's 1st Plenary Session. The composition changed on the merger of the Workers' Party of North Korea and the Workers' Party of South Korea (WPSK) on 24 June 1949, and was again changed after a purge of WPSK-affiliated communists on 6 August 1953.

It sat until the 3rd Congress when it was replaced by the 3rd Standing Committee.

== 1st Plenary Session (1948–49) ==
Rank	Name	Hangul	Government posts	1st POL	1949	Faction
1	Kim Tu-bong	김두봉	Central: Chairman of the WPNK Central Committee	Old	Reelected	Yanan
2	Kim Il Sung	김일성	Central: Vice Chairman of the WPNK Central Committee	Old	Reelected	Partisan
3	Ho Ka-i	허가이	Central: Vice Chairman of the WPNK Central Committee	Old	Died	Soviet
4	Kim Chaek	김책	—	Old	Died	Partisan
5	Choe Chang-ik	최창익	—	Old	Demoted	Yanan
6	Pak Il-u	최창익	—	Old	Demoted	Yanan
7	Pak Chong-ae	박정애	—	Old	Reelected	Soviet
8	Pak Chang-ok	박창옥	—	New	Reelected	Soviet
9	Kim Il	김일	—	Old	Reelected	Partisan
10	Kim Chae-uk	김채욱	—	Old	Demoted	Soviet
11	Chin Pan-su	진판수	—	New	Demoted	Soviet
12	Ki Sok-bok	기석복	—	New	Demoted	Soviet
13	Chong Chun-taek	종춘택	—	New	Reelected	Partisan
14	Jong Il-ryong	종일용	—	Old	Reelected	Soviet
15	Chu Yong-ha	주영하	—	Old	Demoted	Domestic
16	Kim Yol	김열	—	New	Demoted	Soviet
17	Pak Yong-son	박용손	—	New	Demoted	Soviet

== 6th Joint Plenary Session (1953–56) ==
Rank	Name	Hangul	Government posts	1953	3rd STC	Faction
1	Kim Il Sung	김일성	Central: Chairman of the WPK Central Committee	Old	Reelected	Partisan
2	Kim Tu-bong	김두봉	Central: Vice Chairman of the WPK Central Committee	Old	Reelected	Yanan
3	Pak Chong-ae	박정애	—	Old	Reelected	Soviet
4	Pak Yong-bin	박용빈	Central: Vice Chairman of the WPNK Central Committee	Old	Demoted	Soviet
5	Choe Won-taek	최원택	—	New	Demoted	Partisan
6	Choe Chang-ik	최창익	—	Old	Demoted	Yanan
7	Jong Il-ryong	종일용	—	New	Reelected	Soviet
8	Kim Hwang-il	김황일	—	New	Demoted	Soviet
9	Kang Mun-sok	강문석	—	New	Demoted	Domestic
10	Kim Sung-hwa	김성화	—	New	Demoted	Soviet
11	Kim Kwang-hyop	김광협	—	New	Reelected	Partisan
12	Pak Kum-chol	박금철	—	New	Reelected	Partisan
13	Nam Il	남일	—	New	Reelected	Soviet
