= Organisation Committee of the Workers' Party of Korea =

North Korean committee

The Organisation Committee of the Workers' Party of Korea (Korean: 조선로동당 중앙위원회 조직위원회) was established in 1946 and abolished at the 4th Congress of the Workers' Party of Korea.

== Title history ==
Title	Established	Abolished	Established by
Organisation Committee of the Workers' Party of North Korea	30 August 1946	24 June 1949	1st Congress of the Workers' Party of North Korea
Organisation Committee of the Workers' Party of Korea	24 June 1949	18 September 1961	1st Joint Plenary Session of the 2nd Central Committee of the Workers' Party of Korea

== Members ==
=== 1st term (1946–48) ===
Composition not made public.

=== 2nd term (1948–56) ===
==== 1st Plenary Session (1948–49) ====
Rank (Note: Highest rank the individual attained during tenure.)	Name	Hangul	Background
1	Kim Il Sung	김일성	Partisan
2	Ho Ka-i	허가이	Soviet
3	Kim Yol	김열	Soviet
4	Pak Chang-ok	박창옥	Soviet
5	Pak Yong-son	박영선	Domestic

==== 1st Joint Plenary Session (1949–53) ====
Rank	Name	Hangul	Background
1	Kim Il Sung	김일성	Partisan
2	Pak Hon-yong	박헌영	WPSK
3	Kim Chaek	김책	Partisan
4	Pak Il-u	최창익	Yanan
5	Ho Ka-i	허가이	Soviet
6	Yi Sung-yop	이성엽	WPSK
7	Kim Sam-yong	김삼룡	WPSK
8	Kim Tu-bong	김두봉	Yanan
9	Ho Hon	허헌	WPSK
10	Choe Chang-ik	최창익	Yanan
11	Kim Yol	김열	Soviet

=== 3rd term (1956–61) ===
Rank	Name	Hangul	Background
1	Kim Il Sung	김일성	Partisan
2	Choe Yong-gon	최용건	Partisan
3	Pak Chong-ae	박정애	Domestic
4	Pak Kum-chol	박금철	Partisan
5	Jong Il-ryong	정일룡	Domestic
6	Kim Chang-man	김창만	Partisan
