= 2nd National Assembly =

2nd National Assembly may refer to:

- 2nd National Assembly at Astros
- 2nd National Assembly of France
- 2nd National Assembly of Laos, following the 1st Supreme People's Assembly of Laos
- 2nd National Assembly of Namibia
- 2nd National Assembly of Pakistan
- 2nd National Assembly of the Philippines
- 2nd National Assembly of Serbia
- 2nd National Assembly of South Korea
- 2nd National Assembly for Wales
