= 2nd Congress of the Workers' Party of North Korea =

1948 party conference in North Korea

- Date: 27–30 March 1948 (4 days)
- Location: Pyongyang, North Korea
- Participants: 999 delegates (990 of them attended the congress)
- Outcome: Election of the 2nd Central Committee and 2nd Central Auditing Commission

The 2nd Congress of the Workers' Party of North Korea (Korean: 북조선로동당 제 2차 대회) was held in Pyongyang, North Korea, from 27 to 30 March 1948. The congress is the highest organ of the party, and is stipulated to be held every four years. 999 delegates represented the party's 750,000 members. The 2nd Central Committee, elected by the congress, reelected Kim Tu-bong as WPNK Chairman, and Kim Il Sung and Chu Yong-ha as deputy chairmen.

== Congress ==
=== 1st session (27 March) ===
The 1st session was presided over by Kim Tu-bong, Chairman of the 1st Central Committee, and Chu Yong-ha, a Deputy Chairman of the 1st Central Committee, and it lasted for two hours. The first order of business was to elect the officers of the congress; a 57-member executive committee, a 7-member credentials committee, a 9-member secretariat, and a 15-member committee responsible for drafting party documents. As in the previous congress, the Soviet leader Joseph Stalin was elected the congress' honorary chairman. A resolution extolling Stalin's achievements was adopted shortly afterwards. A 3-point agenda was approved by the delegates, and the rest of the time was spent on congratulatory messages from other mass organizations and parties (the most notable one being the one from the Workers' Party of South Korea, read out by Ho Chong-suk). In total 5,287 letters and 5,515 telegrams were received by the congress to congratulate its convening.

=== 2nd–3rd sessions (28–29 March) ===
The 2nd session began with Kim Il Sung delivering the report on the work of the 1st Central Committee while in tandem talking about the international situation. The report praised the work of the Central Committee in the period since the 1st Congress, praising its work in introducing democratic reforms (while in tandem condemning the perceived undemocratic situation in South Korea). In the last part of the report, Kim Il Sung told the congress delegates in the shortcoming in party works, and how they could be improved upon. However, what dominated the speech was Kim Il Sung's accusation that the domestic faction of the old Communist Party of Korea (CPK) were involved in factionalism and anti-party activities. The majority of the domestic communists (those who stayed behind during Japanese rule over Korea) were in large parts opposed to the establishment of the WPNK and the dissolution of the CPK into two halves; one Northern and one Southern. Kim Il Sung claimed that the domestic communists had breached party protocol, even if the majority in the party supported the establishment of the WPNK and the WPSK. O Ki-sop, Hyon Chun-hyok's successor as informal head of the domestic faction, received most of the blame, and was forced to defend himself at the congress. Others who were accused of factionalism were Chong Tal-hyon, Choe Yong-dal, Yi Sun-gun, Chang Si-u and Chang Sun-myong. The majority of those who stood accused were high-standing officials, for instance Chong Yong-dal had served as head of the Justice Bureau, Yi Sun-gun as head of the Agriculture and Forestry Bureau and Chang Si-u as head of the Commerce Bureau for instance.

After Kim Il Sung's opening criticism, several Soviet-Koreans continued the attack, with Han Il-mu accusing O Ki-sop of "individual heroism", Chong Tal-hyon of factionalism, claiming that Choe Yong-dal and Yi Chu-ha were conspiring against the central party leadership and Cho Chung-hwa of embezzlement, and demanding that all of them recant their errors to the congress. Soviet-Korean Kim Yol accused O Ki-sop and Chong Tal-hyon for the opposition to creating an independent communist party in the North, while simultaneously taking orders from the CPK central leadership. He claimed that the two failed to understand the new and favourable conditions which existed in the Northern half for communism, and claimed that they were acting as semifeudal petty bourgeois. Kim Yol went on to accuse Chang Sun-myong in the latter half of his speech, charging that he had failed to perform his duty as a member of the 1st Central Inspection Commission. By this stage, the Soviet-Koreans were contributing to consolidating the position of Kim Il Sung in the party hierarchy; during the struggle between Kim Il Sung and his allies against the domestic faction, the Yanan faction remained neutral.

Because of the pressure asserted on him, O Ki-sop went on to "admit" his mistakes to the congress. He acknowledged that he had not taken the criticism given to him by Kim Il Sung at the 4th plenary session of the North Korean Bureau (held in February 1946); his apology to Kim Il Sung in 1946 was formalistic, and he had in reality been committing double-dealing ever since. Despite this, he claimed that Pak Chang-ok's criticism of him was unjust, stating that as Head of the Labour Bureau he had become obsessed with increasing the powers of the working class in a socialist state through trade unionism. O Ki-sop criticized Kim Yo's criticism of him, claiming they were factual inaccurate. Chang Si-u and Yi Sun-gun apologized to the congress, similar to O Ki-sop, but in contrast to him they accepted the criticism, and pledged their loyalty to the Kim Il Sung's leadership. Choe Yong-dal admitted to mistakes, but claimed that the accusation that he had been participating in factionalism and creating independent power centres from the central party leadership was utterly false. With the accused having apologies the delegates took a 10-minute break. When the meeting resumed, Ho Ka-i (a Soviet Korean) delivered a "stunning speech" in which he harshly criticized all the apologies (focusing most of his speech on O Ki-sop's and Choe Yong-dal's apologies), claiming they were defending their own personal dignity at the expense of the party's image. Cho Yong-ha, a domestic communist, defended O Ki-sop, claiming his stance on the trade unions was a phenomenon of the transitional stage in which North Korean society was undergoing. In the second round of apologies, Chong Tal-hyon accepted all the accusations without "defense or rebuttal". However, Chang Sun-myong went even further, accepting all the accusations and admitting for mistakes he had been accused of.

Kim Il Sung delivered his concluding remarks when the discussions had ended. He criticized by name O Ki-sop, Choe Yong-dal and Chong Tal-hyon, claiming that there "was no substance to the self-criticisms" they delivered. O Ki-sop was the centre of much of the criticism, with Kim Il Sung charging that O Ki-sop's idea of trade unionism had been plagiarized from the works of Vladimir Lenin focusing on the New Economic Policy. He went on to criticize his character, claiming he "was pretentious and arrogant", and had opposed the works of the North Korean Bureau for no other reason then that he was not elected its chairman. Kim Il Sung asserted that Choe Tal-hyon's opposition of the North Korean Bureau was also of a personal character, and criticized Choe Yong-dal of courting "former Japanese collaborators [those who had been imprisoned by the Japanese during the occupation]". He ended his speech by claiming that playing the workers' parties of North and South Korea against each other were a dangerous game, since the two parties would eventually become one.

=== 4th session (30 March) ===
In his first confrontation with his rivals, Kim Il Sung managed to get the Soviet-Koreans to attack the domestic faction. The majority of cadres belonging to the domestic cadres still felt affinity with the party in Seoul and did not support Kim Il Sung's leadership. Cadres belonging to the Yanan faction did not speak out during the congress; with leading figures such as Kim Tu-bong and Choe Chang-ik remaining silent. O Ki-sop tried to get them involved, accusing Mu Chong of "individual heroism", but Mu Chong did not reply and Kim Il Sung condemned O Ki-sop for dragging Mu Chong into a discussion about himself. However, the fact is that it wasn't much the domestic faction could do to weaken Kim Il Sung's authority since he was supported by the Soviets, making him to a certain extent unremovable. At this congress, Kim Il Sung and his allies purged all those WPNK members who had collaborated with the Japanese in one way or another during the occupation—the majority of those who had belonged to the domestic faction since the other factions were headquartered abroad during the occupation.

On Ho Ka-i's suggestion, an 11-member committee (composed of five members of the Political Committee and six provincial chairmen) created a list of nominees for the 2nd Central Committee. With the work done, Kim Il Sung presented 63 nominees for full membership, and 20 for candidate membership (presumably referring to what are now known as alternate members (후보위원). According to Kim Il Sung, the committee chose nominees based on four grounds; if they were outstanding cadres, what position in the government, socialist military or party apparatuses they held, if they were new cadres and at last, former reprimanded communists who were concluded to be "basically good communists." In the order of ranking given to them the nominees stated their personal history to the congress before they were elected; all the nominees for full membership, with the exception of O Ki-sop, were elected unanimously. Of the 990 delegates present, five voted against his candidacy. Similarly, when electing the nominees for candidate membership, only Kim Tu-yong was not elected unanimously, with one vote against. A seven-member Central Auditing Commission was elected unanimously by the congress.

The 2nd Central Committee was composed in total of 63 new members, 30 of which had served in the 1st Central Committee. Among those not reelected were Choe Yong-dal and Chong Tal-hyon. The position of the partisan faction was strengthened at this congress, with Kang Kon, Kim Kwang-hyop, Kim Kyong-sok and Pak Chum-kol being elected to the Central Committee. Despite this, the largest single group within the 2nd Central Committee were the domestic faction.

== 1st plenum of the 2nd Central Committee ==
The 1st plenary session of the 2nd Central Committee convened after the 2nd Congress on 30 March. It followed procedure, and elected the 1st Political Committee (composed of seven members), of which the party's Chairman and two deputy chairmen had to serve in. Kim To-bong was reelected to the chairmanship, while Kim Il Sung and Chu Yong-ha were reelected deputy chairmen. All the members of the 1st Political Committee were reelected (the other two being Ho Ka-i and Choi Chang-ik), while two new were added; Kim Chaek, a partisan, and Pak Il-u from the Yanan faction.
