= Lee Seung-yeop =

Lee Seung-yeop may refer to:

- Yi Sung-yop (1905–1954), North Korean politician
- Lee Seung-yuop, South Korean baseball player and manager
- Lee Seung-yeop (footballer), South Korean footballer
