= 1st Standing Committee of the Workers' Party of North Korea =

The 1st Standing Committee of the Workers' Party of North Korea (WPNK)(1차 북조선로동당 상무위원회) was elected at the 1st WPNK Congress held in August 1946. It consisted of 13 members and remained active until the election of the 2nd Standing Committee by the 1st Plenary Session of the 2nd Central Committee on 30 March 1948. In between sessions of the Standing Committee, the Political Committee met in its place.

== Members ==
=== Political Committee(정치위원회) ===
1. Kim Tu-bong as Chairman
2. Kim Il Sung as Vice Chairman
3. Chu Yong-ha as Vice Chairman
4. Ho Ka-i
5. Choe Chang-ik

=== Standing Committee(상임위원회) ===
1. Kim Tu-bong as Chairman
2. Kim Il Sung as Vice Chairman
3. Chu Yong-ha as Vice Chairman
4. Ho Ka-i
5. Choe Chang-ik
6. Pak Il-u
7. Kim Chang-man
8. Kim Chaek
9. Pak Chong-ae
10. Pak Hyo-sam
11. Pak Chang-sik
12. Kim Il
13. Kim Chae-uk
