= Kim Yol =

North Korean politician

- 김열

Member of the 2nd WPK Politburo

Personal details
- Born: 1918 (age 106–107)
- Occupation: Politician

Kim Yol (Korean: 김열; 1918–?) was a North Korean politician who served in various state and party positions in North Korea's early years.

== Biography ==
He was born in 1918 and arrived in North Korea in December 1945 as part of the 3 Koryoin detachments dispatched from the Soviet Union along with Hoo Guo-i, Pak Ui-wan, Nam Il, Kim Seung-hwa, Ki Sok-pok, and Kim Chan. Originally, he served as a soldier in the Soviet Union.

In August 1946, he was elected a member of the Party Central Committee at the first Party Congress. Later, he was appointed chairman of the North Hamgyong Provincial Party. Since most of the provincial party chairpersons at the time were from Goryeo people, they were called generals of the eight provinces along with Kangwon Province, North Korea party chairman Han Il-mu, Pyongan Province party chairman Kim Chae-uk, North Pyongan Province party chairman Hoo Bin, and Chagang Province party chairman Jang Chol. In March 1948, he was re-elected as a member of the 2nd Central Committee of the 2nd Congress of the Workers' Party of North Korea, and in August 1948, he was elected a delegate to the 1st Supreme People's Assembly, North Korea's unicameral legislature. He was elected to the legislative committee at the first session of the 1st Supreme People's Assembly, and was appointed as the head of the Cabinet Secretariat when the North Korean cabinet was formed following the formal establishment of North Korea. In September 1948, at the 3rd plenary meeting of the 2nd Congress of the Workers' Party of North Korea, the Organisation Committee of the Workers' Party of Korea was re-established, and he was elected as a member of that body serving from 1948 to 1953. In June 1949, at the joint plenary meeting of the North and South Workers' Party, after the Organizing Committee was absorbed into the Standing Committee, he remained as a member of the Standing Committee. In June 1950, he served as a member of the funeral committee of Hong Nam-pyo, and in February 1951, as a member of the funeral committee of Kim Chaek. After the outbreak of the Korean War, in order to focus on military affairs, on September 29, he was dismissed from the Cabinet Secretariat.

At the plenary meeting in December 1950, he was held accountable for the losses and criticized for failing to properly supply materials to the rear, and was dismissed as the head of the rear bureau of the Korean People's Army. He became the chairman of the Hwanghae Province party committee. At the 6th Plenary Meeting of the Central Committee held from August 5 to 9, 1953, he was elected as a member of the Party Rules Revision Committee. In February 1954 he was dismissed from his position as Hwanghae Province party chairman and promoted to the first vice minister of Heavy Industry with Ri Sang-jo replacing him in his previous position. According to Soviet diplomatic documents, in 1956 he was tried by the People's Tribunal and sentenced to 15 years in prison and imprisoned. His life after that is unknown.
