= Ri Yu-min =

North Korean politician (born 1914)

- 리유민

Vice Chairman of the Supreme People's Assembly
- In office 22 December 1953 – 20 September 1957

Personal details
- Born: 1914 Boseong County, Zenranan-dō, Korea, Empire of Japan
- Died: Pyongyang, North Korea
- Citizenship: North Korea
- Party: Workers' Party of Korea
- Education: Dongje University

Korean name
- Hangul: 리유민
- Hanja: 李維民
- RR: Ri Yumin
- MR: Ri Yumin

Ri Yu-min (Korean: 리유민; Hancha: 李維民; 1914 – after 1958) was a North Korean politician who was a member of the Workers' Party of Korea and the Supreme People's Assembly, North Korea's unicameral parliament.

== Biography ==
Born in Boseong County, Zenranan-dō (today's South Jeolla Province), he went into exile in Shanghai, China in 1932 and studied at the German department of Dongje University. He joined the Chinese Communist Party and led the Revolutionary Comrades' Association (October Association), which was formed in Nanjing in August 1935. In July 1942, he was elected as a member of the central executive committee and head of the organization departm-nt of th- North China Korean Independence Alliance, formed at the base of the Eighth Route Army in Taihang Mountains. In March 1948 he was elected as a member of the 2nd Central Committee of the 2nd Congress of the Workers' Party of North Korea, and in August he became a delegate to the 1st convocation of the Supreme People's Assembly as well as vice chairman of that body from 22 December 1953 to 20 September 1957. In October 1950, during the Korean War, he accompanied Pak Hon-yong to visit Beijing. In April 1956, he was elected a member of the 3rd Central Committee of the 3rd Congress of the Workers' Party of Korea. In the 1957 parliamentary election he was re-elected to the 2nd convocation of the Supreme People's Assembly. In 1958, he was dismissed for his involvement in the purge of the Yan'an faction.
