= Yenan (disambiguation) =

Yenan may refer to:

- Wade–Giles romanization (Yen-an) of the city name Yan'an in China
- SS Yenan, a Burmese coastal tanker
- The Yenan faction, a group of pro-China communists in the North Korean government after the division of Korea
- Yan An from known as the only Chinese member in the Korean boy band group Pentagon
