= Yi Kang-guk =

North Korean politician (1906–1955)

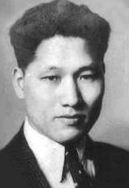

Personal details
- Born: 7 February 1906 Yangju, Gyeonggi Province, Korean Empire
- Died: 1953 Pyongyang, North Korea
- Cause of death: Execution by firing squad
- Party: Workers' Party of Korea
- Education: Bosong High School
- Alma mater: Keijō Imperial University

Military service
- Allegiance: North Korea

Korean name
- Hangul: 리강국
- Hanja: 李康國
- RR: Ri Gangguk
- MR: Ri Kangguk

Yi Kang-guk (Korean: 이강국; Hanja: 李康國; 7 February 1906 – 1955) was a communist politician in the early years of North Korea.

== Biography ==
Born in Yangju, Gyeonggi Province. He is a rumored Sujae who graduated from Bosong High School, and was an elite theorist who studied at the University of Berlin in Germany after entering the theory of communism while attending the Faculty of Law and Literature at Keijō Imperial University. During his studies at Humboldt University of Berlin, he joined the German Communist Party, where he returned to Korea in 1935 and was imprisoned in a labor camp in Wonsan, South Hamgyong Province.

=== Liberation of Korea ===
After the independence, he participated in the National Preparatory Committee and the Democratic Peoples Front, actively engaged in political activities. Through the contribution of the Chosun People's Report dated 25 August 1946, "Hold the US military government and hand over the regime to the People's Committee! The US military is back soon!" As the North. Kim Soo-im, famous for his spying, was living under the premise of marrying Colonel Baird, a US military police officer at the time, and was accompanied by Lee Kang-guk in the commander's car, which was driven by the US military police, so that they could avoid the 38th parallel. He was arrested by the American military government authorities in September 1946.

On 5 August 1947, the Hyundai Daily reported that a student who returned to North Korea after having been in trouble after knowing that North Korea was a paradise, visited his friend Lee Ki-young (李箕永; 1895–1984) in North Korea and heard of Yi Kang-guk. It was reported that he regretted coming to the North, but had no way to return, and was imprisoned for criticizing North Korea's policies. Yi Kang-guk served as the secretary-general of the People's Committee of North Korea, the provisional government governing the northern portion of the Korean Peninsula from 1947 until 1948.

=== North Korea ===
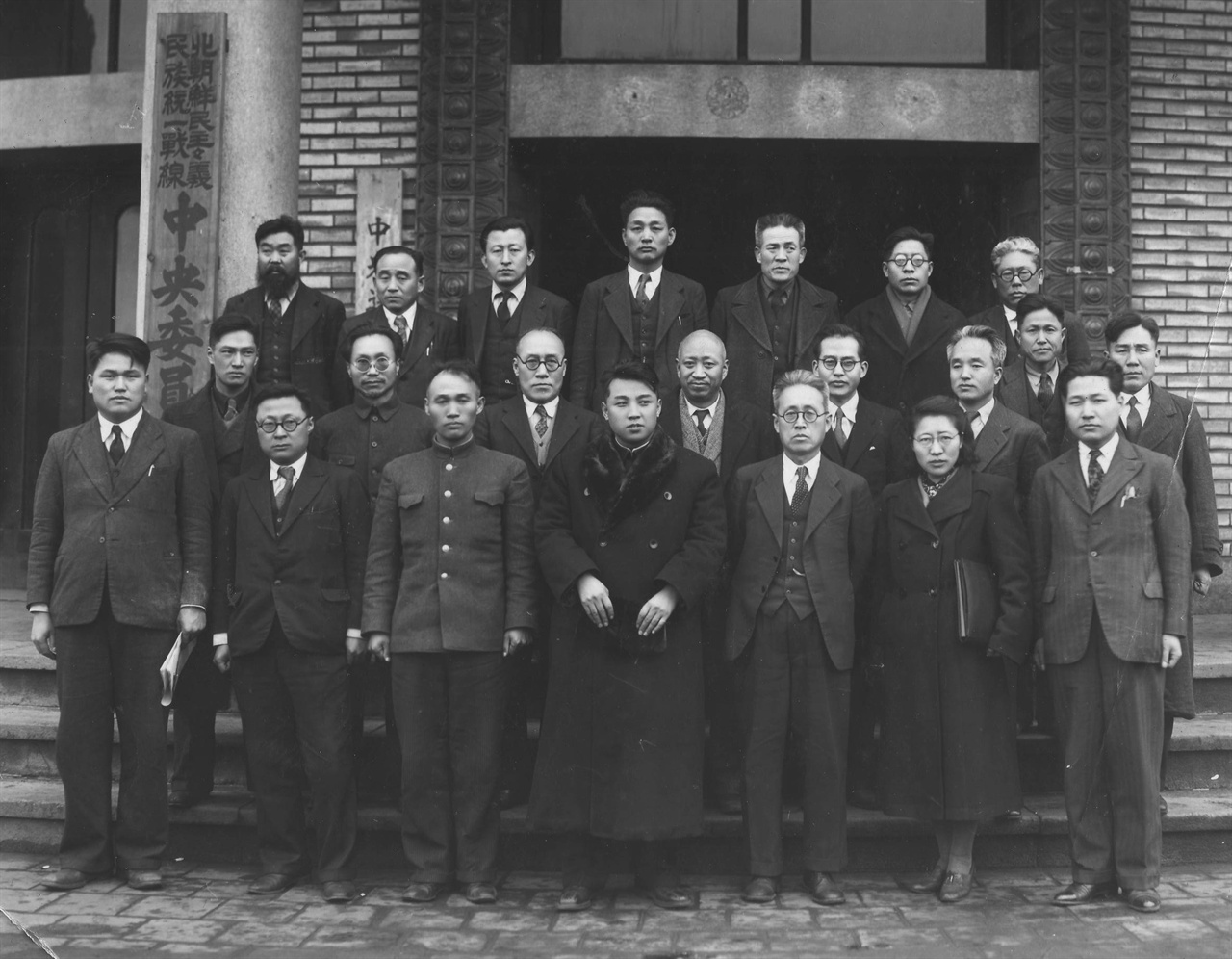
Members of the North Korean National Democratic Front in front of the organization's complex, June 1947. The front row, from left to right: Choe Yong-gon, Kim Chaek, Kim Il Sung, Kim Tal-hyon, Ho Jong-suk, and Yi Kang-guk

In September 1948, following the formal establishment of North Korea and the 1948 parliamentary election to the Supreme People's Assembly, as a member of that body, co-minister for foreign affairs, the President of the People's Army Hospital of Korean People's Army in 1950. In November 1951, he served as President of the Ministry of Trade's General Products Import Corporation, and Joso Airlines.

Around the end of the Korean War, together with Ri Sung-yop, Cho Il-myung (조일명), and Im Hwa (임화) he was arrested on suspicion of overthrowing the government, political terror and being U.S spies, and was purged in 1953.
