= Chu Yong-ha =

North Korean politician (1908–?)

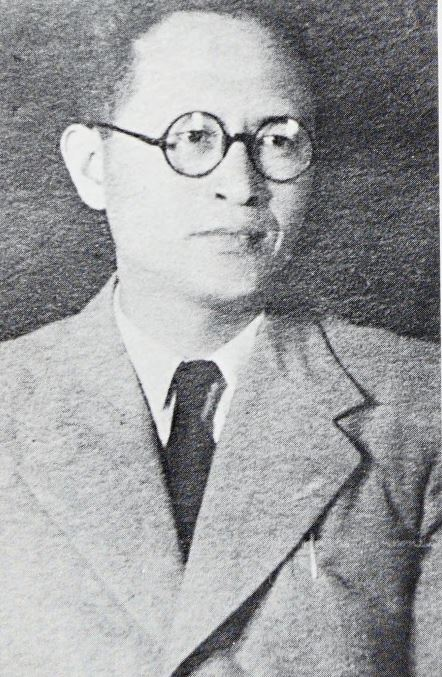

Vice Chairman of the Workers' Party of Korea Central Committee

1st Central Committee
- In office 30 August 1946 – 9 September 1948 Serving with Kim Il Sung
- Chairman: Kim Tu-bong

Minister of Transportation
- In office 9 September 1948 – October 1948
- Premier: Kim Il Sung
- Preceded by: Post established
- Succeeded by: Pak Ui-wan

Personal details
- Born: 1908
- Party: Workers' Party of Korea

Korean name
- Hangul: 주영하
- Hanja: 朱寧河
- RR: Ju Yeongha
- MR: Chu Yŏngha

Chu Yong-ha (Korean: 주영하; Korean pronunciation: [tsu.jʌŋ.ɦa]; 1908 – ?) was a North Korean politician and diplomat. Chu was elected into several posts in the Workers' Party of North Korea, the predecessor of the Workers' Party of Korea, in its early days. Chu was the target of plots ensuing from factional strife within the party. As a member of the Domestic faction, Chu was opposed by the Guerrilla, Soviet and Yan'an factions.

During the Korean War, Chu was North Korea's ambassador to the Soviet Union. After the war, a fictitious plot against Kim Il Sung was "uncovered" in a show trial. Among the claims against the defendants was overthrowing Kim Il Sung and making Pak Hon-yong the new premier, and Chu one of his vice-premiers.

== Biography ==
Chu was born in 1908.

Chu was part of the Political Committee of the Workers' Party of North Korea that was founded in August 1946 as a compromise between rivaling factions of communists on the orders of the Soviets. Chu represented the Domestic faction in the newly formed party.

In the First Congress of the party on 28–30 August 1946, Chu was elected to the Political Committee (Politburo) of the first Central Committee of the party. On the same occasion, Chu was elected vice-chairman of the Secretariat of the party. Chu presided over the session on 30 August. In addition, Chu was elected vice-chairman of the party, along with Kim Il Sung in the first plenum of the Central Committee on 31 August.

In the Second Congress of the party, 27–30 March 1948, Chu was re-elected to the Political Committee of the second Central Committee. Chu presided over the session on 27 March. Chu was re-elected vice-chairman in a plenum of the second Central Committee on 31 March. Chu compromised with the Kim Il Sung faction, but remained a supporter of Pak Hon-yong. In September 1948, when North Korea was officially proclaimed, Chu was appointed to the Minister of Transport in the North Korean Cabinet headed by Premier Kim Il Sung. In the third plenum of the second Central Committee, on 24–25 September 1948, Ho Ka-i replaced Chu as the vice-chairman of the party as well as the chairman of Central Inspection Commission of the Workers' Party of North Korea.

The organ of the North Korean government, Minju Choson, criticized Chu for defending former members of the Workers' Party of South Korea who had stayed in the North. Kim Il Sung's Guerrilla faction, together with the Soviet and Yan'an factions, sought to remove Chu as well.

During the Korean War, Chu was the North Korean ambassador to the Soviet Union.

In the show trial of Ri Sung-yop and 12 other defendants in August 1953 just after the end of the Korean War, a fictitious conspiracy was revealed. According to the accusers, the conspirators planned overthrowing Kim Il Sung and making Pak Hon-yong the premier. Chu was to accompany Chang Si-u as Pak's vice-premiers.

== See also ==
- History of the Workers' Party of Korea
