= 1st Congress of the Workers' Party of North Korea =

North Korean party conference in 1946

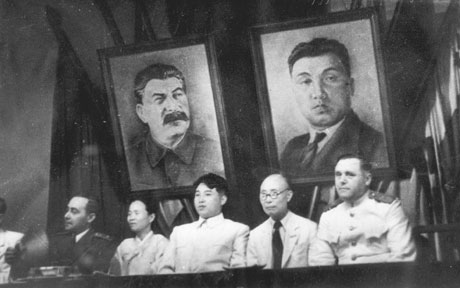
- Date: 28–30 August 1946 (3 days)
- Location: Pyongyang, North Korea
- Participants: 801 delegates
- Outcome: Election of the 1st Central Committee and 1st Central Inspection Commission

The 1st Congress of the Workers' Party of North Korea (WPNK) (Korean: 북조선로동당 제 1차 대회) was held in Pyongyang, North Korea, from 28 to 30 August 1946, and established the Workers' Party of North Korea. The congress is the highest organ of the party, and is stipulated to be held every four years. A total of 801 delegates represented the party's 336,399 members. The 1st Central Committee, elected by the congress, elected Kim Tu-bong as WPNK Chairman, Kim Il Sung and Chu Yong-ha as deputy chairmen.

== Delegates ==
Elected by the party's provincial apparatus, 801 delegates represented 336,399 party members at the congress. Of the delegates, 229 were in their twenties, 417 in their thirties, 129 delegates in their forties, and 26 delegates in their fifties or above. By occupation, 183 of the delegates were classified by the central party apparatus as workers, 157 as peasants, 385 as office workers, and 76 were left unclassified. The majority (359) of the delegates had only high school education, while 228 had only primary education and 214 had college education or above. During Japanese rule, 291 delegates (36 percent) had been imprisoned, while 427 delegates (53 percent) had stayed abroad during Japanese rule.

== Congress ==
=== 1st session (28 August) ===
The 1st session was presided over by Kim Il Sung (the former chairman of the Communist Party of North Korea), and lasted for three hours. The first order of business was to elect the officers of the congress; a thirty-one member executive committee, a five-member credentials committee, a four-member secretariat, a five-member editorial committee, a five-member platform committee and a five-member by-laws committee. In tandem, the delegates voted on a six-point agenda for the congress. Ho Kuh-bong (허국봉), a delegate from Hamgyong-Pukto, proposed making Joseph Stalin, the General Secretary of the Communist Party of the Soviet Union (CPSU), the honorary chairman of the congress, as a thanks for the Soviet Union's contribution to liberating Korea from Japan and for future help in supporting the construction of Korea. Delegates from the Democratic Youth League of North Korea, the North Korean General Federation of Labour Unions, the North Korean Federation of the Peasants Associations and the Korean Democratic Party gave congratulatory remarks to the party. After these speeches, the 1st session was adjourned.

=== 2nd session (29 August) ===
The 2nd session was presided over by Kim Tu-bong, the former leader of the New People's Party (which consisted of Korean communists from China), and the session "lasted from nine in the morning to seven in the evening." The meeting commenced with a statistical report from Pak Il-u, a member of the Yanan faction, about the composition of the delegates. Kim Il Sung and Kim Tu-bong addressed the congress with the main speeches of the day. Kim Il Sung condemned the nationalist leaders in South Korea, criticizing by name Kim Ku and Syngman Rhee, and the general standard of living in the southern half under American occupation. He then outlined the reason for the establishment of the WPNK, claiming the democratic strength of the working class as its purpose. His speech also condemned the former members of the Communist Party of North Korea who opposed the merger of the party with the New People's Party (to establish the WPNK), declaring that those communists who opposed the merger "were a small group of arrogant leftists who thought they were the only true Communists in Korea." He further added that the merger would only strengthen the progressive forces in the country, while in tandem making sure that the WPNK leadership would ensure ideological unity within the party. Kim Tu-bong's speech was similar to Kim Il Sung's; he criticized those members of the New People's Party who opposed the merger with the Communist Party of North Korea (claiming that these members had committed the error of right opportunism). He concluded his speech by outlining a five-point agenda to strengthen the newly established party.

The merger had, as outlined by both Kim Il Sung and Kim Tu-bong, angered several members within both parties. However, Colonel Alexander Ignatiev of the Soviet Civil Authority, who was the mastermind behind the merger, attended the congress to ensure its success. Of the 801 delegates, 15 discussed the two speeches; the discussions were concluded with a remark from Kim Il Sung who approved of the merger. After a brief discussion, a resolution was passed which approved of the merger, named the new party the "Workers' Party of North Korea" (which was designated as the party of the working masses) and a thirteen article platform suggested by Choe Chang-ik. The congress was then adjourned for the day.

=== 3rd session (30 August) ===
The 3rd, and last, session was presided over by Chu Yong-ha, a member of the domestic faction. Kim Yong-bom, a member of the domestic faction, was in charge of drafting the party's by-laws; the party's proposed by-laws were approved after a "brief discussion". Then Tae Song-su, a member of the Soviet-Korean faction, proposed the merger of Chongno (정로,正路Correct Path) and Chonjin (전진, Forward), the newspapers of the Communist Party of North Korea and the New People's Party respectively, and the creation of Rodong Sinmun (Workers' Daily), as the WPNK's main newspaper. The proposal was approved by the congress. The last speech was given by Choe Chang-ik from the Workers' Party of South Korea (WPSK). He talked about the situation for the South Korean communist movement, the establishment of the WPSK, and the WPSK's decision to expel six dissident elements who had opposed the Communist Party of South Korea's merger with other progressive forces. The merger and the expulsion of the six members were approved by the congress.

Last on the agenda was the election of the 1st Central Committee (CC) and the 1st Inspection Commission (IC). A prepared list for nominees for the CC and IC was approved beforehand by the party leadership, and approved by the congress delegates. The 43 nominees to the CC and the 11 nominees to the IC were approved unanimously "after each nominee was introduced." Of the members elected to the 1st Central Committee, 13 belonged to the domestic faction, 12 to the Yanan faction, 6 to the Soviet-Korean faction, 4 belonging to Kim Il Sung's partisan faction, and the affiliation of the remaining 8 members was unknown. The congress, after issuing an open letter to the people of Korea, then adjourned.

== 1st plenum of the 1st Central Committee ==
=== The merger ===
The merger of the Communist Party of North Korea and the New People's Party was met with lukewarm response within the two parties. What became evident to all observers was that few if any Korean communists wanted to create a mass party (as the Soviets insisted), and the leadership of Kim Il Sung was not accepted by the majority in the communist movement at the time. Kim Il Sung had been appointed to leadership by the Soviets, rather than being promoted by his associates. Leading figures from the New People's Party, such as Kim Tu-bong, Mu Chong and Choe Chang-ik, were far more popular with the Korean people then Kim Il Sung; Kim retained his position because the Soviets made it clear that opposition to Kim meant opposition to the Soviet Civil Authority (the Soviet administration in North Korea). Presumably, for this reason alone leading officials at the 1st Congress began adoring Kim Il Sung with compliments; Pak Pyong-so remarked that the Koreans needed a leader and accused everyone opposing Kim Il Sung of being a reactionary. Pak Chong-ae, a delegate from Pyongnam, claimed that Pak Pyong-so's comments were unnecessary since Kim Il Sung "was already recognized as the leader of the entire Korean people." It was because of the Soviets that Kim Il Sung was able to preside over the congress, delivering the political report and presenting the nominees to the Central Committee and the Inspection Commission. His rivals acquiesced to Kim Il Sung's domineering because of the Soviets; the leaders of the rival factions, the Soviet-Korean, domestic and Yanan factions played a small role in the congress' affairs.

=== Election ===
The 1st plenary session of the 1st Central Committee convened after the 1st Congress on 31 August. It elected the 1st Political Committee (composed of five members), the party's chairman (who concurrently has to serve as a member of the Political Committee) and two deputy chairmen. Why the members of the Central Committee did not elect Kim Il Sung chairman is unknown; either Kim Il Sung gave the position to Kim Tu-bong as an honorary position, or the Central Committee members who voted in a secret ballot chose their most preferred candidate. Whatever the case, Kim Tu-bong's ascension to the top party position did not reflect his real power, and Kim Il Sung was the de facto leader under Kim Tu-bong's chairmanship. Kim Il Sung and Chu Yong-ha were elected the party's deputy chairmen, while Ho Ka-i, a Soviet Korean, and Choe Chang-ik, from the Yanan faction, together with the other three were elected to the 1st Political Committee.
