= Ki Sok-pok =

North Korean politician (1913–1979)

- 기석복

Member of the WPK Politburo

Personal details
- Born: 1913
- Died: 1979 (aged 65–66)
- Occupation: Politician

Military service
- Branch/service: Soviet Armed Forces; Korean People's Army
- Rank: Lieutenant General
- Battles/wars: World War II; Korean War

Ki Sok-pok (Korean: 기석복; 1913–1979) was a North Korean politician who served as a member of the Second Politburo of the Central Committee of the Workers' Party of Korea.

== Biography ==
He came to Korea as a soldier of the Soviet Armed Forces following its liberation. and was assigned directly to Colonel Gromov, head of the Political Department under General Ivan Chistyakov who commanded 25th Army Corps. In the early days, he worked as an interpreter for the Soviet military's Political Department and was instrumental in the installation of the pro-Soviet government in the North. In 1948 he became a member of the 2nd Standing Committee of the Workers' Party of Korea, and from 1948 to 1950 he served as chief editor of Kulloja magazine. In November 1950, Ki Sok-pok was appointed Vice Minister of Cultural Propaganda. After the armistice was signed, he was appointed Vice Foreign Minister and was sent as North Korea's representative to negotiations in Geneva. According to Chong Sang-jin, he appeared before the Politburo on 22 October 1955 along with Vice Premier Pak Chang-ok, People's Army Lieutenant General Ki Sok-pok, Director of the Organization Department of the Party Central Committee Pak Yong-bin, and Counselor Chon Dong-hyok. They were then criticized by Kim for lacking the spirit of "Self-Reliance". In the wake of the attack of Kim Il-sung on the Soviet faction, and his growing dissatisfication from the cult of personality around Kim, he returned to the Soviet Union in 1957. In April 1956, Ki Sok-pok was eliminated from the Central Committee at the 3rd Party Congress. Afterwards, he was relegated to the position of president of the Republic Book Publishing House, but he was so terrified that he could not work at all. And Ki Sok-pok, who saw the brutal deaths of those stamped by Kim Il-sung after the sectarian incident in August, abandoned all hope and left North Korea with his sons in November 1957. Ki Sok-pok arrived in Moskva eight days after crossing the Soviet-Manchurian border and settled in the Uzbek SSR where he lived until his death in 1979 from liver cancer.
