= Hong Nam-pyo =

North Korean politician (1889–1950)

Standing Committee Vice Chairman of the Supreme People's Assembly
- In office 22 December 1953 – 20 September 1957

Personal details
- Born: 17 April 1889 Yangpyeong County, Keiki Province, Korea, Empire of Japan
- Died: 3 June 1950 (aged 61) Pyongyang, North Korea
- Resting place: Patriotic Martyrs' Cemetery, Pyongyang, North Korea
- Citizenship: North Korea
- Party: Workers' Party of Korea
- Education: Chung-Ang School

Korean name
- Hangul: 홍남표
- RR: Hong Nampyo
- MR: Hong Namp'yo

Hong Nam-pyo (Korean: 홍남표; April 17, 1889 – June 3, 1950) was a North Korean independence activist and politician who served as a member of the Supreme People's Assembly, North Korea's unicameral parliament.

== Biography ==
Hong was born on April 17, 1889, in Yangpyeong County, Gyeonggi Province. He participated in the revolutionary movement in 1910 after graduating from Seoul Chung-Ang School. In 1919, he participated in the March First Movement and then left for Manchuria, where he participated in partisan activities from 1920, but was arrested in 1921 and imprisoned for two years.

In 1925, he participated in the founding of the Communist Party of Korea and was elected as a candidate member of the Central Committee. On December 9, 1946, he was elected as a member of the Central Committee of the Workers' Party of South Korea at the joint meeting of the Central Committee of the South Korean Labor Party and the Central Inspection Committee. He was arrested by the United States Army Military Government in Korea in 1946 and served four months in prison.

In April 1948, he defected to Soviet-controlled Korea, and attended the south–north joint conference as a representative of the Workers' Party of South Korea. In August 1948, he was elected as a delegate to the 1st Supreme People's Assembly, and on September 9, following the formal declaration of independence at the 1st session of the 1st Supreme People's Assembly, he was elected as vice-chairman of that body. On June 28, 1949, he was elected a member of the Central Committee at the first meeting of the Central Committee of the Fatherland Front.

He died at 7:30 pm on 3 June 1950, just before the outbreak of the Korean War after a serious illness. In November 2005 he was buried at the Patriotic Martyrs' Cemetery in Pyongyang.
