= Kulloja =

North Korean monthly political magazine

- Cover in 1991
- Categories: Political magazine
- Frequency: Monthly
- First issue: 25 October 1946; 80 years ago
- Country: North Korea
- Based in: Pyongyang
- Language: Korean
- OCLC: 9516938

Kulloja (Korean: 근로자; Hanja: 勤勞者; MR: Kŭlloja; pronounced [kɯːlod͡ʑa]; lit. 'Worker') is a political magazine published in North Korea. Launched in 1946 it is published monthly and is an official publication of the Central Committee of the Workers' Party of Korea.

== History and profile ==
Kulloja was first published on 25 October 1946 in Soviet Korea. It is published on a monthly basis. The magazine is an official organ of the Central Committee of the Workers' Party of Korea, and covers articles on political science.

Major contributors of Kulloja have included: Kim Chol and Ryom Kyong-yun. North Korean human rights experts also published articles in the magazine, including Kim Chang-ryul, Ahn Myung-hyuk and Kim Young-guk.

== Editors-in-chief ==
- Tae Song-su (October 1946 – November 1947)
- Pak Chang-ok (November 1947 – March 1948)
- Ki Sok-bok (March 1948 – 1950)

== See also ==
- Rodong Sinmun – Central Committee of the Workers' Party of Korea daily
- Qiushi – Chinese Communist Party equivalent
