= Kim Hwang-il =

North Korean politician

- 김황일

Member of the WPK Politburo

Personal details
- Occupation: Politician

Kim Hwang-il (Korean: 김황일) was a North Korean politician who was a member of the 2nd Politburo and a member of the North Korean parliament.

== Biography ==
In 1948 he was elected a member of the Supreme People's Assembly. In 1953 to 1956 he was a member of the 6th Joint Plenary Session (1953–56) of the 2nd Standing Committee. He was again elected in 1957 as a deputy from North Hwanghae Province.
