= Kim Ung =

North Korean general (1912–?)

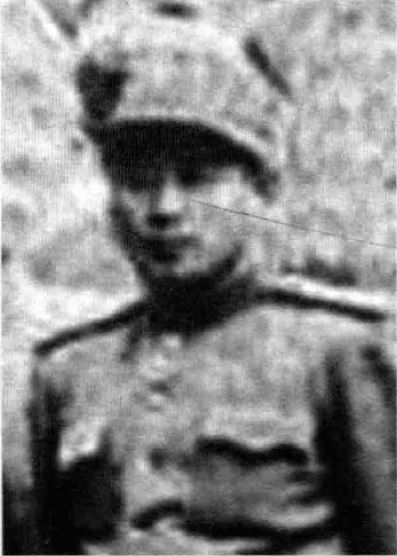

Personal details
- Born: 1912 Gimcheon, Keishōhoku Province, Korea, Empire of Japan
- Citizenship: North Korean

Military service
- Allegiance: Korean People's Army
- Years of service: 1945–1950
- Commands: KPA front commander
- Battles/wars: See battles Korean independence movement: Pacification of Manchukuo; Chinese Civil War World War II: Pacific War; Korean War: Battle of Uijeongbu; Battle of Dongducheon; Battle of Pocheon; Battle of Changdong; Battle of Miari; Battle of Han River; Battle of Sinsa-dong and Gwacheon; Battle of Siheung-Anyang-Suwon; Battle of Taejon; First and Second Battles of Wonju; Third Battle of Wonju; Battle of Pusan Perimeter; Battle of Kyongju; Hungnam evacuation; UN offensive into North Korea; UN September 1950 counteroffensive

- Kim Ung
- Hangul: 김웅
- Hanja: 金雄
- RR: Gim Ung
- MR: Kim Ung

Alternate name
- Hangul: 왕신호
- Hanja: 王信虎
- RR: Wang Sinho
- MR: Wang Sinho

Kim Ung (Korean: 김웅; Korean pronunciation: [ki.muŋ] or [kim] [uŋ]; 1912 – ?) was a North Korean general and vice-minister of defence. He was a member of the Yan'an faction.

== Chinese military ==
Kim fled China to avoid the Japanese occupation, and was trained at the Whampoa Military Academy in the late 1920s or early 1930s. During the late 1930s and the 1940s, he became a communist and was in the Eighth Route Army and became brigadier or divisional commander.

== Korean war ==
On the outbreak of war, 25 June 1950, Kim was a lieutenant general commanding 1 Corps of the Korean People's Army (KPA). On the death in action of Lieutenant General Kang Kon, Kim succeeded him as chief of staff to General Kim Chaek, front commander.

By 1951 Kim Ung was KPA front commander, succeeding Kim Chaek, who was purged for his failure at the Incheon Landing, Kim Ung held the post until the end of the war.

== Post war ==
After the war Kim Ung was appointed vice Defence Minister of North Korea. In 1958 he was purged by Kim Il Sung, rehabilitated and purged again in 1978.
