= Lee Seung-yeop (footballer) =

Korean association football player

Personal information
- Date of birth: 20 July 2000 (age 26)
- Place of birth: South Korea
- Height: 1.80 m (5 ft 11 in)
- Position: Forward

Team information
- Current team: Gyeongnam
- Number: 39

Senior career*
Years	Team	Apps	(Gls)
2019–	Gyeongnam	1	(0)
- * Club domestic league appearances and goals as of 18:35, 16 December 2019 (UTC)

- Lee Seung-yeop
- Hangul: 이승엽
- RR: I Seungyeop
- MR: I Sŭngyŏp

Lee Seung-yeop (Korean: 이승엽; born 20 July 2000) is a South Korean footballer currently playing as a forward for Gyeongnam.

== Career statistics ==
=== Club ===
As of 16 December 2019.

Club	Season	League			Cup		Other		Total	
Club	Season	Division	Apps	Goals	Apps	Goals	Apps	Goals	Apps	Goals
Gyeongnam	2019	K League 1	1	0	0	0	0	0	1	0
Career total			1	0	0	0	0	0	1	0
