= 1st Supreme People's Assembly =

1st Supreme People's Assembly may refer to:

- 1st Supreme People's Assembly of Laos, 1975–89
- 1st Supreme People's Assembly of North Korea, 1948–1957
