= Kim Han-jung =

South Korean politician

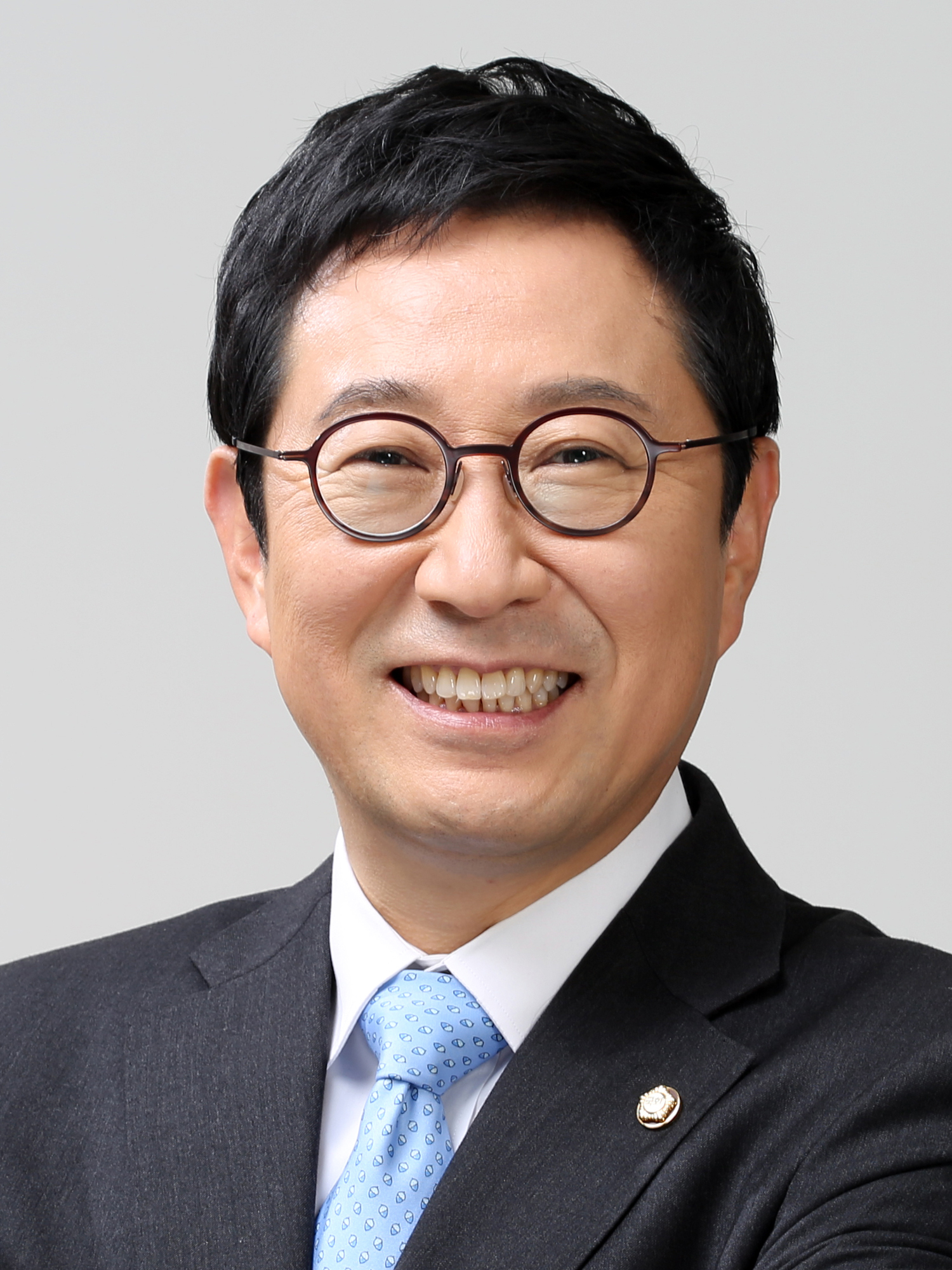

Kim Han-jung (Korean: 김한정) is a South Korean politician serving as a member of the Democratic Party of Korea in the 20th and 21st National Assembly

Kim Han-jung began his political career as press secretary to Kim Dae-jung, the then leader of the Democratic Party of Korea (DPK). After Kim Dae-jung was elected to the presidency, Kim Han-jung served as his Chief Private Presidential Secretary, assisting in the arrangement and execution of the historic inter-Korean summit of 2000, for which President Kim was awarded the 2000 Nobel Peace Prize.

Kim currently holds position on the Trade, Industry, Energy, SMES, and Startups Committee, in addition to the offices of President of the National Assembly's Peace Forum on the Korean Peninsula and Standing Secretary of the Korea-Japan Parliamentarians' Union. Kim also serves as a member of the DPK Korean Peninsula Taskforce and as the chair of the Committee on International Affairs of the DPK.

In July 2018 Kim visited Pyongyang as the Executive Committee Chair of the Korean Council for Reconciliation and Cooperation, and in October of the same year paid a follow-up visit to the United States as a diplomatic envoy for the DPK.

In September 2021, as Senior Advisor on Foreign Policy to Lee Jae-myung, he paid a visit to Washington, D.C.

During his first term at the 20th National Assembly, Kim took on active roles in the National Assembly Special Committee on Inter-Korean Economic Cooperation. He also held the positions of deputy floor leader for policy and Special Advisor on Foreign Affairs and Security to the floor leader of the DPK.

== Education ==
Kim Han-jung graduated from the International Economics Department of Seoul National University, and completed a Ph.D. in international politics at Rutgers University.

== Career ==
2016–Present: Member of the 20th and 21st National Assembly (Two-Term Member, Democratic Party of Korea Representative for Gyeonggi Namyangju City)

- 2022–Present: Vice Chairperson, Trade, Industry, Energy, SMES, and Startups Committee, the National Assembly
- 2021–Present: Chair, Committee on International Affairs, Democratic Party of Korea
- 2020–Present: Standing secretary of the Korea-Japan Parliamentarians' Union
- 2020–Present: President of the National Assembly's Peace Forum on the Korean Peninsula
- 2020–2022: Member of the National Policy Committee, the National Assembly
- 2021–2022: Member of the Special Committee on Budget & Accounts, the National Assembly
- 2020–2021: Head of the COVID-19 National Crisis Management Division, Democratic Party of Korea
- 2020–2021: Chief vice president of the policy committee, Democratic Party of Korea
- 2020: Member of the Korean Peninsula Task Force, Democratic Party of Korea
- 2018–Present: Vice chairperson, Special Committee for the Denuclearization of the Korean Peninsula, Democratic Party of Korea
- 2018–2020: Member of the Public Administration and Security Committee, National Assembly
- 2018–2019: Member, Special Committee on Inter-Korean Economic Cooperation, 20th National Assembly of Korea
- 2017–2018: Member, Education, Culture, Sports and Tourism Committee, 20th National Assembly of Korea
- 2017–2018: Member, Special Committee on Political Reform, 20th National Assembly of Korea
- 2017: Deputy director, Strategy Division, National Election Polling Committee for the 19th presidential Election, Democratic Party
- 2016–2017: Deputy floor leader of the Democratic party, the National Assembly
- 2016: Member, Special Committee on the Probe into the Alleged Manipulation of Government Affairs by President Park's Confidante Choi Soon-Sil and Other Private Citizens, National Assembly of Korea
- 2013–2015: Visiting professor, East Asia International College, Yonsei University
- 2012 – Senior advisor to Moon Jae-in, Presidential Candidate
- 2010–2011: Professor, Graduate School of Social Policy, Gachon University
- 2006–2008: Visiting scholar, the East Asia Center, Cornell University
- 2003–2005: Secretary general, Forum of Democratic Leaders in the Asia-Pacific (FDL-AP)
- 2003–2005: Chief of staff to Kim Dae-jung, former president of Republic of Korea
- 2000 – Member of the delegation to the Inter-Korean Summit in 2000 (President Kim Dae-jung, Pyeong-yang)
- 1999–2003: Senior private secretary to President Kim Dae-jung
- 1998–1999: Counsel to Director of National Intelligence Service for International Affairs (NIS)
- 1989–1992: Press secretary to Democratic Party chairperson Kim Dae-Jung for public relations

== Awards ==
- 2017: Awarded by the National Assembly Secretariat in 2016 as Distinguished Member of the National Assembly in Recognition of Excellence in Legislation and Policy Development
- 2017: Awarded as the Most Distinguished Member of the National Assembly in Recognition of Active Involvement in the National Assembly Library
- 2016: Awarded as Distinguished Democratic Party Member of the National Assembly in Recognition of Excellence in Parliamentary Audit
- 2016: Winner of the 4th Sunfull (meaning positive comments) Award for Member of the National Assembly in Recognition of Increasing the Practice of Posting Positive Messages Online

== Election results ==
=== General elections ===
Year	Elections	Constituency	Political party	Votes (%)	Results
2016	20th National Assembly General Election	Namyangju B (Gyeonggi)	Democratic	36,789 (38.63%)	Won
2020	21st National Assembly General Election	Namyangju B (Gyeonggi)	Democratic	68,660 (59.08%)	Won

=== Local elections ===
==== Mayor of Gyeonggi Namyangju ====
Year	Elections	Constituency	Political party	Votes (%)	Remarks
2014	6th Iocal Election	Mayor of Gyeonggi Namyangju	NPAD	109,185 (46.06%)	Defeated (2nd)
