= List of members of the National Assembly of Serbia, 1992–1993 =

== MPs by party ==
Name	Abbr.	Leader	Ideology	Political position	MPs	Gov′t
Socialist Party of Serbia; Социјалистичка партија Србије; Socijalistička partija Srbije	SPS	Slobodan Milošević	Communism; Yugoslavism	Left-wing	101 / 250	G
Serbian Radical Party; Српска радикална странка Srpska radikalna stranka	SRS	Vojislav Šešelj	Ultranationalism; Serbian irredentism	Far-right	73 / 250	S
Serbian Renewal Movement; Српски покрет обнове Srpski pokret obnove	SPO	Vuk Drašković	Monarchism; Atlanticism	Centre-right	30 / 250	O
Democratic Party of Serbia; Демократска странка Србије; Demokratska stranka Srbije	DSS	Vojislav Koštunica	National conservatism Christian democracy	Right-wing	18 / 250	O
Democratic Fellowship of Vojvodina Hungarians; Демократска заједница војвођанских Мађара; Demokratska zajednica vojvođanskih Mađara	DZVM	András Ágoston	Hungarian minority politics Regionalism	Centre	9 / 250	O
Democratic Party; Демократска странка Demokratska stranka	DS	Dragoljub Mićunović	Social liberalism Pro-Europeanism	Centre	6 / 250	O
Peasants Party of Serbia; Сељачка странка Србије; Seljačka Stranka Srbije	SSS	Milomir Babić	Agrarianism; Monarchism	Centre-right	3 / 250	O
New Democracy; Нова демократија Nova demokratija	ND	Dušan Mihajlović	Liberalism; Social democracy	Centre to centre-left	2 / 250	O
