= Pak Yong-bin =

North Korean politician

- 박영빈

Member of the WPK Politburo

Personal details
- Born: Tashkent
- Occupation: Politician

Pak Yong-bin (Korean: 박영빈) was a North Korean politician who served as the Vice Chairman of the Workers' Party of Korea.

== Biography ==
He was born in Tashkent and graduated from a party school. From 1953 to 1956, he was a member of the 6th Joint Plenary Session of the 2nd Standing Committee of the Workers' Party of Korea. From 23 March 1954 to 18 September 1961, he served as the Vice Chairman of the Workers' Party of Korea.
Being a member of the Soviet faction, in 1956 he was purged during the August faction incident.
