= 1st Supreme People's Assembly of Laos =

1st Supreme People's Assembly
- State emblem of the Lao People's Democratic Republic

2 December 1975 – 1 June 1989 (13 years, 181 days) Overview
- Type: Session of the Supreme People's Assembly of Laos
- Election: 2 December 1975

Leadership
- President: Souphanouvong
- Vice President: Sisomphone Lovansay; Faydang Lobliayao; Khamsouk Keola; Sithone Kommadan

Members
- Total: 45

The 1st Supreme People's Assembly of Laos was elected by the National Congress of People's Representatives on 2 December 1975. It was replaced by the 2nd Supreme People's Assembly on 1 June 1989.

== Meetings ==
Meeting	Start–end	Length	Session agenda
1st Ordinary Session	TBD	26 days	10 items
2nd Ordinary Session	TBD	20 days	7 items
3rd Ordinary Session	TBD	26 days	? items
4th Ordinary Session	TBD	25 days	? items
5th Ordinary Session	TBD	14 days	5 items
6th Ordinary Session	TBD	23 days	5 items
7th Ordinary Session	TBD	14 days	7 items
8th Ordinary Session	TBD	22 days	? items
9th Ordinary Session	TBD	7 days	? items
10th Ordinary Session	TBD	16 days	? items

== Officers ==
=== Presidency ===
Rank	Title	Name	Akson Lao	Took office	Left office	Duration
1	President of the Standing Committee of the Supreme People's Assembly of Laos	Souphanouvong	ສຸພານຸວົງ	2 December 1975	1 June 1989	13 years and 181 days
2	Vice President of the Standing Committee of the Supreme People's Assembly of Laos	Sisomphone Lovansay	ສີສົມພອນ ລໍວັນໄຊ	2 December 1975	1 June 1989	13 years and 181 days
3	Vice President of the Standing Committee of the Supreme People's Assembly of Laos	Faydang Lobliayao		2 December 1975	12 July 1986	10 years and 222 days
4	Vice President of the Standing Committee of the Supreme People's Assembly of Laos	Khamsouk Keola		2 December 1975	1987	11 years and 30 days
5	Vice President of the Standing Committee of the Supreme People's Assembly of Laos	Sithone Kommadam	ສີທົນ ກົມມະດຳ	2 December 1975	1 March 1977	1 year and 89 days

=== Secretariat ===
Rank	Title	Name	Akson Lao	Took office	Left office	Duration
1	Secretary-General of the Standing Committee of the Supreme People's Assembly of Laos	Khamsouk Keola		2 December 1975	1987	11 years and 30 days
2	Deputy Secretary-General of the Standing Committee of the Supreme People's Assembly of Laos	Say Phetrasy		2 December 1975	12 July 1986	10 years and 222 days
3	Deputy Secretary-General of the Supreme People's Assembly of Laos	Souvannarath Sayavong		2 December 1975	May 1977	1 year and 150 days

=== Supreme Advisors ===
Name	Akson Lao	Took office	Left office	Duration
Savang Vatthana	ຊີວິຕ ວັດທະນາ	2 December 1975	13 May 1978	2 years and 162 days
Souvanna Phouma	ສຸວັນນະພູມາ	2 December 1975	10 January 1984	8 years and 39 days

== Members ==
Rank	Name	Akson Lao	2nd SPA	Gender	Supreme People's Assembly					LPRP
Rank	Name	Akson Lao	2nd SPA	Gender	STC	CDC	EFC	PDE	PSB	3rd CC
1	Souphanouvong	ສຸພານຸວົງ	Not	Male	Member	—	—	—	—	—
2	Sisomphone Lovansay		Not	Male	Member	—	—	—	—	—
3	Faydang Lobliayao		Died	Male	Member	—	—	—	—	—
4	Khamsouk Keola		Died	Male	Member	—	—	—	—	—
5	Sithone Kommadan		Died	Male	Member	—	—	—	—	—
6	Say Phetrasy		Not	Male	—	—	—	—	—	—
7	Souvannarath Sayavong		Not	Male	—	—	—	—	—	—
8	Thit Mouane Saochanthala		Not	Male	Member	—	—	—	—	—
9	Chareun Phouangchan		Not	Male	—	—	—	—	—	—
10	Xieng Sing Homsombat		Not	Male	—	—	—	—	—	—
11	Khampheng Boupha		Not	Female	Member	—	—	—	—	—
12	Khamsouk Vongvichit		Not	Female	—	—	—	—	—	—
13	Simeui Namala		Not	Male	Member	—	—	—	—	—
14	Kouat Keovongsa		Not	Male	—	—	—	—	—	—
15	Ponmek Daraloy		Not	Male	—	—	—	—	—	—
16	Maha Khamphan Virachit		Not	Male	—	—	—	—	—	—
17	Somvandy Phommaly		Not	Male	—	—	—	—	—	—
18	Nao Heugtho		Not	Male	—	—	—	—	—	—
19	Heuane Mongkholvilay		Not	Male	—	—	—	—	—	—
20	Pheng		Not	Male	—	—	—	—	—	—
21	Chane Pao Vanthanouvong		Not	Male	—	—	—	—	—	—
22	Phayboun Pholsena		Not	Female	—	—	—	—	—	—
23	La Soukan		Not	Male	—	—	—	—	—	—
24	Kouily Banchongphanit		Not	Male	—	—	—	—	—	—
25	Chao Chan Phetsarath		Not	Female	—	—	—	—	—	—
26	Mok Phoumsavanh		Not	Male	—	—	—	—	—	—
27	Pha Vongsay		Not	Male	—	—	—	—	—	—
28	Leuam Insisiengmay		Not	Male	Member	—	—	—	—	—
29	Khamlek Sayasith		Not	Male	—	—	—	—	—	—
30	Houmpheng Soukhaseum		Not	Male	—	—	—	—	—	—
31	Somphavanh Inthavong		Reelected	Male	Member	—	—	—	—	—
32	Khampet Thounsvath		Not	Male	—	—	—	—	—	—
33	Bounlap Nhouivanisvong		Not	Male	—	—	—	—	—	—
34	Bounkeut Khamphaphongphane		Not	Male	—	—	—	—	—	—
35	Vanh Phommahasay		Not	Male	—	—	—	—	—	—
36	Bounnack Souvannavong		Not	Male	—	—	—	—	—	—
37	Soukouang		Not	Male	—	—	—	—	—	—
38	Savang Chanthepha		Not	Male	—	—	—	—	—	—
39	Khamlane Souvanchit		Not	Male	—	—	—	—	—	—
40	Thit Khampheng Sayasith		Not	Male	—	—	—	—	—	—
41	Somvang Sengsathit		Died	Male	—	—	—	—	—	—
42	Somphou Oudomvilay		Defected	Male	—	—	—	—	—	—
43	Sameu Mouthoulay		Defected	Male	—	—	—	—	—	—
44	Boun Siyavong		Defected	Male	—	—	—	—	—	—
45	Vong Savang	ายวงศ์สว่าง	Arrested	Male	—	—	—	—	—	—
