= Kim Chang-man =

North Korean politician (1907–1966)

- 김창만
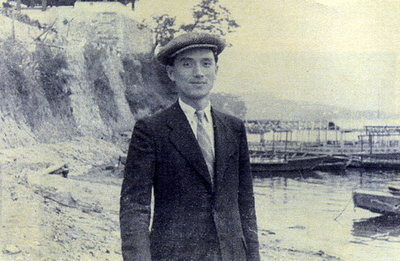

Minister of Education
- In office 1956–1957
- Premier: Kim Il Sung
- Preceded by: Paek Nam-un
- Succeeded by: Han Sorya

Personal details
- Born: 1907 North Hamgyong Province, Korean Empire
- Died: May 1966 (aged 58–59)
- Citizenship: North Korean
- Party: Workers' Party of Korea

Kim Chang-man (Korean: 김창만; 1907–May 1966) was a Korean independence activist and a politician of the Democratic People's Republic of Korea. He held key positions, including Director of the Propaganda and Agitation Department and Vice Chairman of the Central Committee and Vice Premier, but was purged in 1966.

== Biography ==
Born in North Hamgyong Province, he graduated from Jungdong Middle School in Seoul. He later moved to China and graduated from Sun Yat-sen University in 1928. He joined the Korean Independence League—organized in Yan'an by figures such as Kim Tu-bong and Ch'oe Ch'angik—and engaged in the communist movement while serving as an executive of the league in East Manchuria. He assassinated Jo Si-je, the son of Jo So-ang, who had been dispatched to Manchuria on a special mission by the Provisional Government of the Republic of Korea.

Following the outbreak of the Second Sino-Japanese War, he went to Nanjing, joined the Korean National Revolutionary Party, and graduated from the special training course at the Central Military Academy of the Chinese Army (December 1937–May 1938).

He participated in the Korean Volunteer Corps, founded in October 1938. In late 1939, he became the leader of the KVC's mobile propaganda unit, operating in the Fifth War Zone of Hubei Province and the Xi'an area. In the summer of 1941, he moved to the base of the Eighth Route Army in North China; in July 1942, he was elected as a member of the Central Executive Committee of the North China Korean Independence League and as the political commissar for the North China detachment of the Korean Volunteer Army. From early 1944, he served as the head of propaganda for the "Enemy Zone Operations Team" of the North China Korean Independence League.

=== After Liberation ===
Following the liberation of Korea on August 15, 1945, he returned to North Korea. He served as the Director of the Propaganda and Agitation Department of the Workers' Party of North Korea in 1946 and as the principal of the Sadong Cadre School in 1947. Between 1946 and 1947, he collaborated with Han Jae-dok to spearhead a campaign promoting Kim Il-sung as a national leader. In 1946 he appeared in Our Construction film.

He held key positions, including Minister of Education and Vice Chairman of the Central Committee of the Workers' Party of Korea in 1956, Chairman of the Foreign Affairs Committee of the Supreme People's Assembly in 1957, and a member of the Standing Committee of the Workers' Party Central Committee in 1958.

He avoided the purge associated with the August faction incident and the elimination of the Yan'an faction in 1958; instead, he demonstrated his loyalty to Kim Il-sung by being at the forefront of calls to purge fellow Yan'an faction members such as Kim Tu-bong and Ch'oe Ch'angik. In recognition of this service, he became a standing committee member of the Committee for the Peaceful Reunification of the Fatherland and a vice chairman and member of the 4th Politburo of the 4th Central Committee in 1961. He was subsequently elected Vice Premier of the 3rd Cabinet in 1962. Following the 1957 parliamentary election he served deputy to the 2nd convocation of the Supreme People's Assembly and following the 1962 parliamentary election he served a deputy to the 3rd convocation of the Supreme People's Assembly.

In 1966, he became a vice chairman and member of the 4th Politburo of the 4th Central Committee, but his activities were halted. That May, he was purged for engaging in propaganda and agitation activities deemed contrary to the Juche ideology.
