= Guerrilla faction =

1945–1956 faction in North Korea

- Hangul: 만주파; 빨치산파
- Hanja: 滿洲派; 빨치산派
- RR: Manjupa; ppalchisanpa
- MR: Manjup'a; ppalch'isanp'a

The Guerilla faction, also known as the Manchurian faction, was a faction of the Workers' Party of Korea whose members were mostly guerrilla fighters active in Manchukuo and the Soviet Union against Japanese colonial rule in Korea. Its leaders were Pak Kum-chol and Kim Il Sung. In the 1950s and 1960s, Kim Il Sung used the August faction incident to eliminate the Yan'an faction, the Soviet faction, and the domestic faction. Afterwards, the guerrilla faction became the largest faction within the Workers' Party of Korea.

== History ==
To resist Japanese imperial rule over the Korean Peninsula, Pak Kum-chol's local guerrilla forces joined forces with Kim Il Sung's ethnic Koreans in Northeast China. They subsequently won the crucial Battle of Pochonbo. After World War II, Soviet and domestic factions returned to North Korea and joined the guerrilla and Yan'an factions to form the Workers' Party of Korea. Kim Il Sung was elected supreme leader due to his perceived contributions to the anti-Japanese war, while the Yan'an faction became the largest faction within the Workers' Party, maintaining a close relationship with the other two. In 1956, dissatisfied with Kim Il Sung's excessive personality cult and economic policies, the Yan'an and Soviet factions attempted to challenge him at the 3rd Congress of the Workers' Party of Korea, but failed. Instead, Kim used this as a pretext to purge members of the Yan'an, Soviet, and domestic factions. After eliminating political enemies outside his factions, Kim Il Sung turned his attention to internal opponents— the Kapsan faction and military opposition. In August 1967, he executed Pak Kum-chol for opposing the Chollima Movement. After that, Kim Il-sung had no rivals in the Workers' Party of Korea and became the party's dictator.

== Significant figures ==
- Kim Il Sung
- Kim Chang-bong
- Park Kim-cheol
- Lee Hyo-chun
- Kim Do-man
- Park Yong-guk
- Kim Dong-kyu
- Ryu Kyung-soo
- Hwang Soon-hee
