= Yi Sung-yop =

First and only North Korean mayor of Seoul

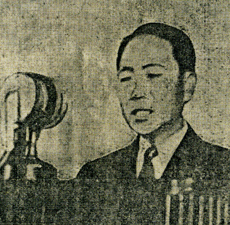
- Yi Sung-yop in 1950

Chairman of the People's Control Commission

1st Cabinet of North Korea
- In office 8 May 1952 – 3 March 1953
- Premier: Kim Il Sung
- Preceded by: Choe Chang-ik
- Succeeded by: Yi Ki-sok

Second Secretary of the Workers' Party of Korea Central Committee

2nd Central Committee
- In office 24 June 1949 – 2 July 1953
- Chairman: Kim Il Sung
- 1st Secretary: Ho Ka-i
- 3rd Secretary: Kim Sam-yong

Minister of Justice

1st Cabinet of North Korea
- In office 9 September 1948 – 13 December 1951
- Premier: Kim Il Sung
- Preceded by: Post established
- Succeeded by: Yi Yong

Personal details
- Born: 8 February 1905 Keiki Province, Korea, Empire of Japan
- Died: 30 July 1954 (aged 49)
- Party: Workers' Party of Korea
- Education: Incheon High School of Commerce

Yi Sung-yop (Korean: 리승엽; February 8, 1905 – July 30, 1954) was a communist activist during the Japanese occupation of Korea and a politician during the early years of North Korea.

He was early involved in the founding of the Communist Party of Korea and was an aide of Pak Hon-yong, and he participated in workers’ strike activities throughout the 1930s. He participated in the founding of the Workers' Party of South Korea in 1946 after the liberation of August 15 following the surrender of Japan. In addition, he served as a member of first and second CC of the WPK, and afterwards held the positions of the North Korean Workers' Party's political chairman (the second North Korean Workers' Party's political chairman) and the People's Censorship Committee (the new first North Korean Workers' Party's People's Censorship Committee). After the formal establishment of the Democratic People's Republic of Korea he served in the first North Korean Cabinet as the first Minister of Justice, and then served as Deputy Secretary-General of the Cabinet and National Censorship Office. In 1953, Yi and Pak Hon-yong were sentenced to death in the US espionage case, and was executed on July 30, 1954.

== Biography ==
=== Early life ===
Born as a son of a poor boatman in Seongjae-ri, Bupyeong-myeon, Gyeonggi Province, and a short childhood in Bucheon-gun, Gyeonggi-do, he later grew up in Incheon, Gyeonggi-do. His father worked as a boatman and later ran an inn. After graduating from ordinary school, he went to Incheon High School of Commerce in Gyeonggi-do. While attending Incheon High School, he joined the March 1st Movement in 1919 and was expelled. After getting a job at a factory, he became a labor activist by resentment of a poor working environment. Then, in 1923, he joined the Youth Alliance of the Communist Party of Korea.

=== First stages in politics ===
In 1924, he participated in the founding of the 1st Chosun Communist Party and joined the Chosun Ilbo in September of the same year to become a reporter. In September 1925, when the Communist Party of Korea was founded under the leadership of the Hwayo Association, he joined The Chosun Ilbo as a journalist. After that, he worked as a labor movement and served as the central member of the Korea Labor Federation. After that, he was arrested in 1926 for being related to the organization of the Communist Party and was released.

In 1930, in Busan, Park Jang-song, Ahn Young-dal, and Kim Hyung-yun were arrested while attempting to produce and distribute a flyer called "Strike to the Combat Ship's Compressed and Exploited Class" underground. It was named as the main proponent of the Busan Anti-Half-Day Incident. In 1931, he campaigned to rebuild the Communist Party of Korea with Pak Hon-yong and Kim Dan-ya, but was arrested and frustrated. After that, he served in the Seodaemun Prison for 4 years.

In 1937, he was arrested at the 4th Korean Communist Party Youth Alliance in Hamhung, Hamgyong Province, and placed in jail until 1939. Later, in 1941, he was active in Yamatojuku and converted (that is, collaborate with Japanese authorities).

=== After liberation of Korea ===
After the liberation of August 15, 1945, he became the 2nd secretary of the Communist Party of Janganpa, but returned to Pak Hon-yong on August 16, when he re-unified and re-established the Communist Party of Korea and joined the founding committee. In September 1945, he was elected to the Political Bureau of the Reconstruction of the Communist Party of Korea and served as Deputy General Manager of the Central People's Committee of the People's Republic of Korea. In November 1945, he was elected to the Central Committee of the Communist Party of Korea. In early 1948 he was arrested by the U.S Military Government, but managed to escape in August 1948, and went to the north of the 38th parallel with Ho Hon for the North–South negotiations and stayed there.

=== North Korea ===
Following the formal proclamation of the Democratic People's Republic of Korea, he was elected to the first convocation of the Supreme People's Assembly in September 1948. He served as the Minister of Justice in the North Korean Cabinet led by Premier Kim Il-sung, and in June 1949, when the North Korean Workers' Party and the South Korean Workers' Party were united, he became a member of the Central Committee of the Workers' Party of Korea and the second secretary of the party.

==== Korean War ====
When the Korean War started in June 1950, he went south along with Kim Il-sung and was elected chairman of the Seoul Metropolitan People's Committee on June 28. After that, he became Mayor of Seoul and served as Chairman of the Seoul People's Committee and Mayor of Seoul. As chairman of the Seoul People's Committee, he directed the abduction of Kim Kyu-sik, An Jae-hong, Chong In-bo, Bang Eung-mo, and Kim Yong-mu, who were not able to escape from Seoul. The Sino-North Korean Joint Command would launch the Third Phase Offensive, moving into Seoul again on 4 January 1951, but was forced to abandon the city after less than 3 months. Yi enjoyed a second stint as North Korea's chief administrator in Seoul.

==== Downfall ====
He was appointed chairman of the People's Censorship Committee in 1952, but was arrested in October 1952 for accusations of attempting to overthrow the government using the Kumgang Military Academy, a training center for the guerrillas, and was charged with anti-party sects and US spies the following year. In March 1953, he was dismissed as chairman of the People's Censorship Committee.
