= Pak Kum-chol =

North Korean politician (1911–1967)

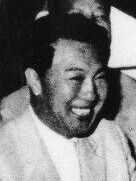
- Pak in 1961

Personal details
- Born: 1911 Kapsan County, Kankyōnan Province, Japanese Korea
- Died: May 1967 (age 55–56)
- Cause of death: Unknown, possibly suicide or execution

Korean name
- Hangul: 박금철
- Hanja: 朴金喆
- RR: Bak Geumcheol
- MR: Pak Kŭmch'ŏl

Pak Kum-chol (Korean: 박금철; 1911 – May 1967) was a North Korean politician. Having been a guerrilla during the anti-Japanese struggle, he became a high-ranking politician after the liberation of Korea. Pak aligned himself with his former guerrilla brothers-in-arms from the Kapsan Operation Committee to form a faction within the ruling Workers' Party of Korea (WPK) called the "Kapsan faction". This faction sought to replace Kim Il Sung with Pak. Kim retaliated by purging the faction in 1967 in what is known as the Kapsan faction incident. Pak was sent to work at a factory in the countryside and was either executed or died by suicide in May 1967.

== Early life ==
Pak Kum-chol was born in 1911 in Kapsan, Kankyōhoku Province, Japanese Korea (now in South Hamgyong Province, North Korea). He participated in communist guerrilla activities in since the early 1930s. Pak encountered Kim Il Sung in 1936. Pak became a founding member of the underground Kapsan Operation Committee, which fought alongside Kim against the Japanese. After the liberation of Korea, members of the committee participated in North Korean politics as part of the guerrilla faction of Kim Il Sung. Political developments resulted in the Kapsan guerrillas being seen as a separate faction, called the "Kapsan faction" after the original Kapsan committee. Pak became the leader of this faction.

== Kapsan faction incident ==
The Kapsan faction sought to replace Kim Il Sung in a 1967 event that became known as the Kapsan faction incident. Pak had risen in rank to become the vice premier of the state. He was formally the fourth-highest-ranking member of the Political Committee of the Workers' Party of Korea (WPK), but in truth the second most influential. Pak was annoyed by the ballooning cult of personality of Kim Il Sung and how it neglected the experiences of people like him who had sacrificed a lot to the country during the liberation of Korea. Pak gathered many influential supporters around him, including Yi Hyo-sun, Kim To-man, Pak Yong-guk, Ho Sok-son, Ko Hyok, Ha Ang-chon, and Rim Chun-chu.

The Kapsan faction sought to name Pak the successor of Kim Il Sung. As an initial move, they helped Kim Il Sung purge Kim Chang-nam, a prominent political theorist, but only to make room for Pak. The faction members started exalting Pak's words as "teachings" equal to those of Kim Il Sung. An album from 1964 had Pak Tal and Pak Kum-chol's photos printed next to that of Kim Il Sung. When Pak Kum-chol's wife Choe Chae-ryon died, Kim To-man, who was the Director of the Propaganda and Agitation Department of the party, produced a work called An Act of Sincerity – described variously as either a film or a stage play – that portrayed her devotion to her husband. Kim Il Sung disapproved of it and implied that it exhibited misplaced loyalty. Kim To-man also had Pak's birthplace rebuilt. An unauthorized biography on Pak was apparently made while dissemination of propaganda materials on Kim Il Sung was neglected.

These actions were perceived of as ultimate acts of disloyalty toward Kim Il Sung. Pak was soon condemned by Choe Yong-gon, chairman of the Standing Committee of the Supreme People's Assembly, of proliferating "feudal, Confucian ideas". Pak was accused of not supporting the party's military line; he openly ridiculed Kim Il Sung's slogan "one against a hundred" by concluding that a literal interpretation of it could not be true. Production plans that were his responsibility, it was said, were not met. Pak was accused of promoting the old Kapsan Operation Committee members into important posts. At the fifteenth plenum of the fourth Central Committee of the WPK, on 4–8 April, Kim had more than 100 faction members formally expelled from the party. Pak was sent to work in a factory in the countryside and was either executed or committed suicide in May 1967.

== See also ==
- Politics of North Korea
