= Soviet faction =

1945–1956 faction in North Korea

- Hangul: 소련파
- Hanja: 蘇聯派
- RR: Soryeonpa
- MR: Soryŏnp'a

The Soviet faction was a faction of pro-Soviet Union communists in the Workers' Party of Korea after the division of Korea following World War II. Its members were mostly Koreans from the Soviet Union, and its leaders were Ho Ka-i and Pak Chang-ok. This faction was purged by Kim Il Sung in the 1950s.

== Overview ==
In the early 19th century, there were approximately 5,000 Koreans living in the Russian Empire. After the collapse of the Russian Empire in 1917 and the establishment of Soviet Russia, some of these Koreans joined the Communist Party of the Soviet Union or the Red Army. Following World War II, they returned to North Korea and joined the Workers' Party of Korea and the government. These individuals later formed a faction known as the Soviet faction.

In 1953, Kim Il Sung, the then supreme leader of North Korea, believed that the Soviet faction posed a threat to him, so he declared that Ho Ka-i had betrayed the country and dismissed him from his position as vice premier. Ho Ka-i was subsequently executed by Kim Il-sung, or according to another account, committed suicide. In 1956, Pak Chang-ok, dissatisfied with Kim Il-sung's policies and line, joined forces with the Yan'an faction to try to challenge him at a meeting of the Central Committee, but failed. Subsequently, Kim Il Sung retaliated and purged the Soviet faction on various charges, and the Soviet faction thus declined. Most of those who returned to the Soviet Union in Central Asia did not return to North Korea.

== List ==
- Ho Ka-i
- Pak Chang-ok
- Kim Sung-hwa
- Jin Lie
- Qishifu
- Pak Ui-wan
- Park Young-bin
- Kim Jae-wook
- Tae Sung-soo
- Li Lian

Nam Il-hwa and Pang Hak-se were not purged because they supported Kim Il-sung.
