= Pak Il-u =

North Korean security chief purged in 1955

Vice Marshal Pak Il-u
- 박일우

Minister of Communications

1st term
- In office March 1953 – November 1955; 1st Cabinet of North Korea
- Premier: Kim Il-sung
- Preceded by: Kim Jong-ju
- Succeeded by: Kim Chang-hup

Minister of Interior

1st term
- In office September 1948 – October 1952; 1st Cabinet of North Korea
- Premier: Kim Il-sung
- Preceded by: Post established
- Succeeded by: Pang Hak-se

Personal details
- Born: 1903 Hoeryong, North Hamgyeong Province, Korean Empire
- Died: c. 1955 North Korea
- Party: Chinese Communist Party; Workers' Party of Korea (expelled)
- Education: Taesong School; Central Party School
- Awards: Order of Freedom and Independence (First-Class)

Military service
- Allegiance: Communist China; North Korea
- Branch/service: Eighth Route Army; Korean People's Army
- Years of service: 1937-1953
- Rank: Vice Marshal
- Commands: Ministry of Internal Affairs; Bureau of Internal Affairs; Central Military & Political School, Korean Independence Alliance
- Battles/wars: Second Sino-Japanese War; Korean War

Korean name
- Hangul: 박일우
- Hanja: 朴一禹
- RR: Bak Ilu
- MR: Pak Iru

Pak Il-u (Korean: 박일우; 1903 – c. 1955) was a Korean independence activist, military officer and politician. Following the formal establishment of the Democratic People's Republic of Korea, he was the first Minister of Interior in the North Korean Cabinet.

== Biography ==
Born in Hoeryong, North Hamgyeong Province, he moved to Manchuria as a child, graduated from Yongjeong, Gil-hyeon, Jilin Province, and served as a teacher. He entered the Chinese pavilion and joined the Chinese Communist Party with the pseudonym "Wang Wei". (Note: Recorded as "王巍" or "王魏") After the Second Sino-Japanese War, he worked as an on-site in the medical examination area (晉察冀 邊區, local government of China). After the July 7th Incident, he joined the first guerrilla detachment in Pingxi in the winter of 1937. In January 1938, he went to the Jin-Cha-Ji Military Region. He served as an instructor at the Coastal Military Administration University, and in July of the same year, he was appointed Deputy Commander of the Korea Medical School and launched an anti-Japanese struggle. In July 1942, he went to the Taihang Mountain Anti-Japanese Revolutionary Base to participate in the establishment of the Korean Independence Alliance (Note: Referred to by the name of "Korean Independent League" in CIA documents.) and the Korean Volunteer Army. An earlier CIA document claimed that Pak and the Independence Alliance were affiliated with the Soviets, but later files corrected that he was a member of the Yan'an faction and the only Korean known to have graduated from the Central Party School.

== Return to Korea ==
He served as a standing member of the Central Committee of the Korean Independence Alliance and a deputy commander of the Korean Volunteer Army. CIA information indicated that Pak served as Director of the Alliance's Central Politico-Military School. After entering Korea in November 1945, he was active in political matters. In August 1946 he became senior Member of the Central Committee of the North Korean Workers' Party, by February 1947 he was appointed Director of Internal Affairs of the People's Committee of North Korea. On 2 September 1947, Pak Il-u was identified by the CIA as Director of the Internal Affairs Bureau, at which time, the Bureau was already acknowledged to be operating a "secret police" system with the authority to place even provincial governors under arrest. In March 1948, he became a member of the Central Committee of the North Korean Workers' Party.

Following the formal declaration on the establishment of the Democratic People's Republic of Korea he was elected to the first convocation of the Supreme People's Assembly and was appointed the first Minister of Interior in the North Korean Cabinet led by Premier Kim Il Sung until 1953 and was awarded the rank of Lieutenant General. During this period, the CIA ranked Pak as the most important minister in North Korea. On 21 April 1949, the Hwanghae Inminpo reported his appointment as member of the National Budget Reviewing Committee. In early May, two metal patrol vessels for the Coast Guard, each weighing 200 tons, were launched in the presence of Pak Il-u at the Kalpo-ri shipyard.

Other US intelligence files also recorded his role as spokesperson for the People's Army. In June 1949, Pak became a member of the Democratic Front for the Reunification of Korea; in June 1950 he became a member of the Military Committee. On November that year, he became Vice Commander of the Front Command, and Minister of Political Security by July 1951. Under his instructions, the Interior Ministry participated in the construction of air raid shelters. On 10 September 1950, Pak was one of the officials who attended Kang Kon's funeral. In November 1950, he served as Deputy Commander of the Korean People's Army Frontline Command (1950.11-1952.2). In December, he served as Deputy Political Commissar of the Joint Command of the Chinese People's Volunteers and the Korean People's Army. On December 19, Pak was recorded as a former Politburo member of the North Korean Workers' Party and a new Politburo member of the Korean Central Workers' Party after the merging of the Northern and Southern parties.

On 5 October 1951, the CIA commented on his political leanings:

Pak Il-u is still playing both sides and is highly regarded and well-liked by both the Chinese Communist generals and Kim Il-sung, although Pak maintains a safehouse for the anti-Kim Il-sung faction. Pak is maintaining a hold over the hot-headed young officers who compose the Central Guard Brigade, Kim’s own personal bodyguards, who are aware of the anti-Kim Il-sung group. The Central Guard Brigade wishes to eliminate the group threatening Kim Il-sung, and only Pak can hold them in check.

Previously, a news report of interest to the CIA from the Sopuk Sinmun had accused Pak and Minister of Defense, Choe Yong-gon, of abusing their authority for personal enrichment. Pak Il-u's wealth was estimated at the range of 200 million won in 1950 money.

In 1951, Kim Il-sung had dismissed Mu Chong, the most powerful figure in the Yan'an faction, the deputy minister of the Ministry of National Defense and the artillery commander of the Korean People's Army, on the grounds of "losing Pyongyang" and "weak combat effectiveness". CIA information stated that Kim later tried to place the blame for war on Mu and Pak, but was unsuccessful. During the Korean War, clashes between the Chinese and North Korean troops meant Pak Il-u had to serve as mediator between the two, and his appointment to the Joint Command was meant to formalize his authority on this front. On 12 February 1952, Pak attended a special staff meeting at the North Korean Army General Headquarters, where general North Korean military policies in a post-ceasefire scenario were finalized. He was raised to the military rank of Vice Marshal in 1953. According to the CIA, Pak was still serving as Interior Minister and Director for the Workers' Party's Political Training and Election committees in as late as mid-January 1953. Another report pushed Pak Il-u's resignation as Interior Minister back to November 1952, while South Korea's Chungang Ilbo pinpointed the exact time of this shuffle to fall 1952.

The same report furnished that before the reorganization of ministries, Pak's Ministry of Internal Affairs and Pang Hak-se's Ministry of Social Security were both "interested in intelligence matters and there was overlapping and duplication of efforts." Employees of both ministries wore the same uniform and were also confused over lines of authority, and this "led to many petty feuds and jealousies."

== Death ==
Pak, considered to be a personal representative of Mao Zedong, was replaced by Choe Yong-gon in the post of deputy political commissar of the Joint Command of the Chinese and Korean Army in February 1953. By March of the same year, when the North Korean cabinet was re-elected, he was removed from the position of Interior Minister and appointed Minister of Communications, until November 1955 when he was purged and later executed. In early to mid-1953, by then still a minister and Party member, Pak Il-u was reportedly displeased with the favor shown to Soviet Koreans.

The CIA believed that Pak and Mu Chong sought to unite with Pak Hon-yong rather than Kim Il-sung, thus laying the foundation for their downfall. In the fallout of the Pak Hon-yong espionage case, a special court chaired by Choe Yong-gon ordered Pak Il-u's expulsion from the Workers' Party.
