= Yan'an faction =

1945–1956 faction in North Korea

- Hangul: 연안파
- Hanja: 延安派
- RR: Yeonanpa
- MR: Yŏnanp'a

The Yan'an faction (Korean: 연안파) were a group of pro-China communists in the North Korean government after the division of Korea following World War II.

The group was involved in a power struggle with pro-Soviet factions but Kim Il Sung was eventually able to defeat both factions and dominate the North Korean government, allowing him to push for unification during the Korean War. "Yeonan" is the Korean reading of the Chinese communist town Yan'an, the capital of the Yan'an Soviet.

Led first by Mu Chong and then by Kim Tu-bong and Choe Chang-ik, the Korean exiles had lived in Yan'an Soviet and joined the Chinese Communist Party whose headquarters were at Yan'an. They had formed their own party, in exile, the "North-Chinese League for the Independence of Korea". In the autumn of 1945, the Soviet Union allowed some 4,000 Koreans who had joined the Chinese communist movement to fight with the People's Liberation Army to return to North Korea, though they disarmed them. They then formed the New People's Party, which merged with the Communist Party in 1946 to form the Workers Party of North Korea. Many members of the Yan'an faction had fought in the Chinese Eighth Route Army and New Fourth Army and thus had close relations with Mao Zedong.

== Influence ==
The group included thirty Korean People's Army (KPA) generals by the time the Korean War started. Mu Chong was vice marshal at the Ministry of Defence, Pak Il-u was minister of internal affairs, and deputy commander North Korea-China Combined Forces Command. Kim Ung was KPA front commander in 1951, Pang Ho-san, Lee Kwon-mu and Kim Chang-dok were corps commanders.

== List ==
- Kim Tu-bong
- Choe Chang-ik
- Mu Chong
- Ho Jong-suk
- Pak Il-u
- Han Pin
- Yun Kong-hum
- So Hwi
- Kim Chang-man
- Kim Won-bong
- Ri Yu-min
