= Ch'oe Ch'angik =

Korean politician (1896–1960)

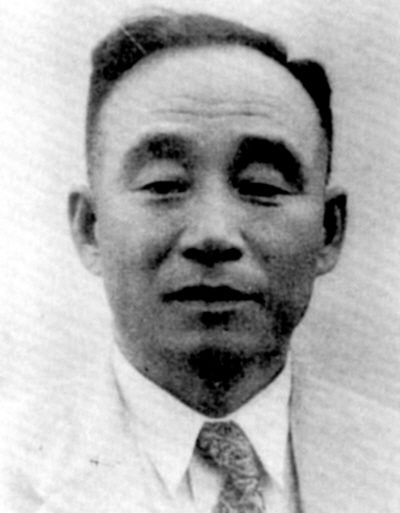

Vice Premier of the Cabinet

1st Cabinet of North Korea
- In office 29 November 1952 – 23 September 1956 Serving with Pak Hon-yong, Hong Myong-hui, Ho Ka-i, Choe Yong-gon, Pak Ui-wan, Pak Chang-ok and Kim Il.
- Premier: Kim Il Sung

Minister of State Control

1st Cabinet of North Korea
- In office 8 May 1952 – August 1955
- Premier: Kim Il Sung
- Preceded by: Kim Won-bong
- Succeeded by: Yi Hyo-sun

Minister of Finance

1st Cabinet of North Korea
- In office 23 March 1954 – November 1954
- Premier: Kim Il Sung
- Preceded by: Yun Kong-hum
- Succeeded by: Yi Hyo-sun
- In office 9 September 1948 – 29 November 1952
- Premier: Kim Il Sung
- Preceded by: Post established
- Succeeded by: Yi Hyo-sun

Personal details
- Born: 1896 Onsong County, Joseon
- Died: 1960 (aged 63–64) Pyongyang, North Korea
- Alias: Ch'oe Ch'angsŏk, Ch'oe Ch'angsun, Ch'oe Tongu, Ri Kŏnu

Korean name
- Hangul: 최창익
- Hanja: 崔昌益
- RR: Choe Changik
- MR: Ch'oe Ch'angik

Ch'oe Ch'angik (Korean: 최창익; Hanja: 崔昌益, 1896–1960) was a Korean politician in the Japanese colonial era. He was a member of the Korean independence movement. He was also known by the names Ch'oe Ch'angsŏk (최창석; 崔昌錫), Ch'oe Ch'angsun (최창순; 崔昌淳), Ch'oe Tongu (최동우; 崔東宇), and Ri Kŏnu.

== Early life ==
Ch'oe Ch'angik was born in Onsong County, Korea Empire in 1896. His exact date of birth remains unknown.

In his fifth year of high school he participated in the March First Movement, which resulted in his expulsion. That same year he went to Japan to continue his education at the Seisoku English School (today's Seisoku Gakuen High School).

Ch'oe Ch'angik later studied at Tokyo's Waseda University in the Department of Economics and Politics where he organized a student union and continued his activism. This included secretly infiltrating areas in Korea such as Ganggyeong, Jeonju, Okgu, and Gunsan, where he went on a lecture tour to share his ideas on socialism and equality. Ch'oe Ch'angik was arrested by the Japanese police for these activities but was eventually released. He graduated from Waseda University in February 1925.

== Timeline ==
In June 1923, Ch'oe Ch'angik returned to Korea and became a member of the Korean Labor Society. In July of that year he helped found the Korea Communist Youth Alliance and served as a commissioner. By September he was arrested by the police while leading a Korean Labor Conference meeting. In April 1924, Ch'oe took part in the founding of the Joseon Youth Alliance and was elected to the group's central executive committee. Eight months later he helped found the Socialist Alliance (an organization not affiliated with the Seoul Youth Association) and was elected to serve as a member of its executive committee.

Following his graduation Ch'oe traveled to the Communist International World Congress as a representative of the Seoul Youth Association. During his return home he became involved with Kim Chwajin's Korean People's Association in Manchuria. Ch'oe eventually worked to create a communist league within the organization.

Ch'oe eventually seceded from Kim's group in October 1925 and returned to Korea. In the same month Japanese officials arrested him for his involvement with the Sinmin group along with Han Bin (한빈; 韓斌), Lee Kyung-ho (이경호; 李京鎬) and Lee Young (이영; 李英). In 1926, Ch'oe and Park Du-hui, a member of the Sinmin group, were selected to attend a communist conference in Vladivostok of Russian far east. While there he joined efforts to start a national party assembly. In 1927, upon returning to Korea, he joined, and became an executive, of the Communist Party of Korea. In February 1928 Ch'oe was imprisoned for the so-called "Third Communist Party of Korea Incident". He escaped from prison in 1935.

In 1936, he sought and gained political asylum in China. There he became a part of the Korean National Revolutionary Party and formed the Chonwi Club (전위동맹) in Hankou. He married his wife, Heo Jong-suk, in 1937. In May 1938, he became the commander of Choson uiyongdae (조선의용대), which was Kim Won-bong's Korean National Revolutionary Party's Military Organisation, but he complained that it was funded by Chiang Kai-shek's Kuomintang. A disagreement followed and he left Kim Won-bong's (김원봉; 金元鳳) organisation. He also went to Yan'an, in partnership with Mu Chong (무정; 武亭) and Kim Tu-bong (김두봉; 金枓奉).

In January 1941, with funding from the Chinese Communist Party, and later with Yi Kŏnu, Mu Chong founded the "Hebei Korea Youth Federation" in Jindong. In 1942, with Kim Tu-bong and Yi Kŏnu, Mujung, Han bin was created as a Chosun independent alliance, and he was elected as the vice-chairman of the independent alliance. In September 1945, he was appointed to the Communist Party of Korea's Political Committee, and in December he returned to Pyongyang with Kim Tu-bong and Mu Chong. In March 1946, he founded the New Korean Democratic Party and was elected vice-chairman. In August of that year he was involved in the integration of the New Democratic Party and the Communist Party of Korea to North faction of Workers' Party of Korea. In September the Workers' Party of North Korea's Central Committee, the Standing Committee, elected Ch'oe as commerce and business commissar.

Ambassador Ianov and Ch'oe Ch'angik discussed the visit of the DPRK government delegation to Eastern Europe and the USSR (east bloc), and the policies of the Korean Workers' Party. In 1948 he attended the Workers' Party of North Korea's Central Committee and the deputies of the North Korean Supreme People's Assembly. In September Ch'oe became the first North Korea minister of finance; in 1952 deputy prime minister; in 1954 minister of finance and in 1955 security minister of the DPRK.

== See also ==
- Kim Won-bong
- Pak Hon-yong
- Kim Tu-bong
- Ho Jong-suk
- August Faction Incident
