= Executive Committee of the North Korean Branch Bureau =

Government agency in North Korea

13 October 1945 – 30 August 1946 (321 days) Overview
- Type: Executive Committee of the North Korean Branch Bureau
- Election: Conference of Korean Communist Party Members and Enthusiasts in the Five Northwestern Provinces

Leadership
- First Secretary: Kim Il Sung; Kim Yong-bom
- Second Secretary: O Ki-sop

Members
- Total: 14

Apparatus
- Head of General Affairs: Pak Chong-ho
- No. of departments: 9

The Executive Committee of the North Korean Branch Bureau (NKBB) of the Communist Party of Korea (CPK) (Korean: 북조선공산당 집행위원회) was established by a CPK conference on 13 October 1945, and was through the merger with New People's Party of Korea replaced by the 1st Central Committee of the Workers' Party of North Korea on 30 August 1946. It changed its name to the Central Committee of the Communist Party of North Korea sometime between 2–18 May 1946, becoming an independent party from the CPK.

== Plenary sessions ==
Plenum	Start–end	Length	Agenda
Conference of Members and Enthusiasts	10–13 October 1945	4 days	2 items.: North Korean version–that this meeting marked the establishment of the Workers' Party of Korea.; Report by Kim Il Sung on organisational concerns.; Election of an Organisation Committee.; South Korean version—that is meeting marked the establishment NKBB.; The forming of the North Korea Branch Bureau of the Communist Party of Korea; Election of party secretaries: Kim Yong-bom elected as First Secretary and O Ki-sop as Second Secretary.
1st Enlarged Plenary Session	15 November 1945	1 day	1 item.: On problems faced while enlarging and strengthening the Democratic National United Front.; Reorganising the CPK Communist Youth League in North Korea into the Democratic Youth League.
2nd Enlarged Plenary Session	17–18 December 1945	2 days	3 items.: Report by Kim Il-sung on mistakes and deficiencies in communist activities.; Election of a Secretary.; Kim Il Sung elected.
3rd Enlarged Plenary Session	15 February 1946	1 day	1 item.: On improving the Provisional People's Committee of North Korea.
4th Plenary Session	Not made public.	Not made public.	Not made public.
5th Enlarged Plenary Session	10 April 1946	1 day	1 item.: Report by Kim Il-sung, known as "General Summation of the Land Reform and the Future Tasks".
6th Enlarged Plenary Session	22–23 June 1946	2 days	Not made public.
7th Enlarged Plenary Session	27–29 July 1946	1 day	2 items.: Report by Kim Tu-bong, the Chairman of the New People's Party of Korea, and a report by Kim Il-sung.; Debate on party rules and party platform of the new party.; The release of "Declaration Concerning the Coalition of the New Democratic Party and the North Korean Branch Bureau of the Communist Party of Korea to Found the Workers' Party of North Korea".

== Officers ==
=== First Secretary ===
Title	Officeholder	Hangul	Birth	Death	Took office	Left office	Duration
First Secretary of the Executive Committee of the North Korean Branch Bureau of the Communist Party of Korea	Kim Yong-bom	김용범	1902	1947	13 October 1945	18 December 1945	66 days
First Secretary of the Executive Committee of the North Korean Branch Bureau of the Communist Party of Korea	Kim Il Sung	김일성	1912	1994	18 December 1945	2 May 1946	135 days
First Secretary of the Central Committee of the Communist Party of North Korea	Kim Il Sung	김일성	1912	1994	2 May 1946	30 August 1946	120 days

=== Second Secretary ===
Title	Officeholder	Hangul	Birth	Death	Took office	Left office	Duration
Second Secretary of the Executive Committee of the North Korean Branch Bureau of the Communist Party of Korea	O Ki-sop	오기섭	1903	NDDK	13 October 1945	January 1946	80 days
Second Secretary of the Executive Committee of the North Korean Branch Bureau of the Communist Party of Korea	Kim Yong-bom	김용범	1902	1947	January 1946	2 May 1946	121 days
Second Secretary of the Central Committee of the Communist Party of North Korea	Kim Yong-bom	김용범	1902	1947	2 May 1946	30 August 1946	120 days

== Department ==
Department	Head	Hangul	Term start	Term end	Background
Cadre Department	Yi Tong-hwa	이통화	13 October 1945	30 August 1946	Soviet
Education Department	Han Sol-ya	한설야	13 October 1945	30 August 1946	Domestic
General Affairs Department	Pak Chong-ho	박종호	13 October 1945	30 August 1946	Domestic
Labour Department	Choe Kyong-dok	최경독	13 October 1945	30 August 1946	Domestic
Peasant Department	Yi Sun-jik	이순직	13 October 1945	30 August 1946	Domestic
Propaganda Department	Kim Kyo-yong	김교용	13 October 1945	30 August 1946	Domestic
Organisation Department	Chu Yong-ha	주영하	13 October 1945	18 December 1945	Domestic
Organisation Department	Ho Ka-i	허가이	18 December 1945	30 August 1946	Soviet
Women Department	Pak Chong-ae	박정애	13 October 1945	30 August 1946	Domestic
Youth Department	Kim Uk-chin	김욱진	13 October 1945	30 August 1946	Domestic

== Members ==
Name	Hangul	1st CC	Background				
Name	Hangul	1st CC	Background	An Kil	안킬	Elected	Partisan
Chang Chong-sik	장종식	Elected	Domestic				
Chang sun-myong	장선명	Elected	Domestic				
Choe Kyong-dok	최경독	Elected	Domestic				
Chu Yong-ha	주영하	Elected	Domestic				
Kang Chin-gon	강진곤	Elected	Domestic				
Kim Il Sung	김일성	Elected	Partisan				
Kim Kyo-yong	김교용	Elected	Domestic				
Kim Ung-gi	김웅기	Not	Domestic				
Kim Yong-bom	김용범	Not	Domestic				
O Ki-sop	오기섭	Elected	Domestic				
Pak Chong-ae	박정애	Elected	Domestic				
Song Pong-ok	송퐁옥	Not	Domestic				
Yi Sun-jik	이순직	Not	Domestic				
