= Communism in Korea =

The Communist movement in Korea emerged as a political movement in the early 20th century. Although the movement had a minor role in pre-war politics, the 1948 division between North Korea and South Korea came to dominate Korean political life in the post-World War II era. North Korea, officially the Democratic People's Republic of Korea, continues to be a Juche-oriented state under the rule of the Workers' Party of Korea. In South Korea, the National Security Law has been used to criminalize advocacy of communism and groups suspected of alignment with North Korea.

Due to the end of economic aid from the Soviet Union after its dissolution in 1991, the impractical ideological application of Stalinist policies in North Korea over years of economic slowdown in the 1980s, and the recession and famine during the 1990s, North Korea has replaced Marxism-Leninism with the Juche idea despite nominally upholding Communism. References to Communism were removed in the North Korean 1992 and 1998 constitutional revisions to make way for the personality cult of Kim's family dictatorship and the (admittedly reluctant) North Korean market economy reform.

The Workers' Party of Korea under the leadership of Kim Jong Un later reconfirmed its commitment to establishing a communist society in 2021, but orthodox Marxism has since been largely tabled in favor of "Socialism in our style". Officially, the DPRK still retains a planned economy with complete state control of industry and agriculture. North Korea maintains collectivized farms and state-funded education and healthcare.

== History ==
=== Early Korean communism ===
Alexandra Kim, a Korean who lived in the Soviet Far East, is sometimes credited as the first Korean communist. She had joined the Bolsheviks in 1916. In 1917, Vladimir Lenin sent her to Siberia to mobilize Koreans there against the counter-revolutionary forces and the Allied Expeditionary Forces. In Khabarovsk, Kim was in charge of external affairs at the Far-Eastern Department of the Party along with Communist International (Comintern) official Pak Chin-sun. There they met with Yi Dong-hwi, Kim Rip and other Korean independence fighters. Together they founded the Korean Socialist Party, the first Korean communist party, on June 28, 1918.

Evolving from the Socialist Party, the Korean Communist Party established two separate branches in Irkutsk and Shanghai, but disputes between the two factions were irreconcilable and the party was eventually dissolved. Prominent members of the Korean provisional government in exile and activists from the 1919 March First movement were attracted to the communist cause, not out of ideological affinity, but as a way to rid Korea of the Japanese occupation. Jo So'ang was once a prominent socialist along with Kim Kyu-sik, who addressed the Comintern Congress of the Toilers of the Far East in 1922. Other prominent leftists include Yo Un-hyeong, Choe Chang-ik, Kim Tu-bong, Hong Beom-do and Ho Hon.

=== Founding of the Communist Party of Korea ===
The Communist Party of Korea was founded during a secret meeting in Seoul in 1925. The leaders of the party were Kim Yong-bom and Pak Hon-yong. The party became the Korean section of the Communist International at the 6th congress of the International in August–September 1928. But after only a few months as the Korean Comintern section, the perpetual feuds between rival factions that had plagued the party since its founding led the Comintern to disband the Communist Party of Korea in December the same year. However, the party continued to exist through various party cells. Some Korean communists went into exile in China, where they participated in the early years of the Chinese Communist Party and the Chinese Red Army. In the early 1930s, Korean and Chinese communists began guerrilla activity against the Japanese forces. The Korean National Revolutionary Party, formed by exiles on the left, was the main political party dominating the provisional government.

=== End of the Second World War ===
After the liberation in 1945, the situation for the Korean communists changed considerably. In the South, Communist Party leader Pak Hon-yong, a former resistance fighter, became active in Seoul after his release in 1945. He reorganized a Central Committee, and became its Secretary. Being based in Seoul, his group had limited contact with the Soviets in the north.

The Soviet Red Army liberated northern Korea in August 1945. At the time, there were very few Communist cadres in the North. The Soviets began to rely largely on exiled Communists who returned to Korea at the end of World War II as well as ethnic Koreans who were part of the large Korean community in the USSR. Kim Il Sung became a prominent figure of the party in the northern areas. After his years as a guerrilla leader in the Northeast Counter-Japanese United Army, Kim Il Sung moved to the Soviet Union and became a captain in the Red Army. His battalion arrived in Pyongyang just as the Soviets were looking for a suitable person who could assume a leading role in North Korea. Other associates of Kim included Kim Chaek, Choe Yong-gun, Kim Il and Pak Kum-chol.

On October 13, 1945, the North Korea Bureau of the Communist Party of Korea was established. Though technically under the control of the Seoul-based party leadership, the North Korean Bureau had little contact with Seoul and worked closely with the Soviet Civilian Authority. The first chairman of the Bureau was Kim Yong-bom, who had been sent to Korea by the Comintern in the 1930s to conduct underground activity. Kim Il Sung was a member of the Bureau at its founding and replaced Kim Yong-bom as chairman in December 1945. Official North Korean historians later disputed this, claiming that Kim Il Sung had been its chairman from the onset of the Bureau. Moreover, official North Korean sources claim that the meeting was held on October 10. October 10 is regarded as the 'Party Foundation Day' in North Korea, when Kim Il Sung formed the first genuine communist party in the country. Official North Korean historians tend to seek to downplay the role of early communist leaders like Pak Hon-yong. Official North Korean sources claim that the name of the Bureau was changed to 'Organizational Committee of the Communist Party of North Korea' (often simply referred to as the 'Communist Party of North Korea').

On July 22, 1946, the North Korea Bureau joined with the New People's Party, the Democratic Party and the Chondoist Chongu Party (supporters of an influential religious movement) to form the North Korean Fatherland United Democratic Front.

=== Formations of separate Workers parties ===
On July 29, 1946, the New People's Party and the North Korea Bureau held a joint plenum of the Central Committees of both parties and agreed to merge into a single entity. A founding conference of the Workers Party of North Korea was held on August 28–30. Kim Tu-bong, the leader of the New People's Party, was elected chairman of the party. Vice Chairmen of the party were Chu Nyong-ha and Kim Il Sung. At the time of establishment, the party is believed to have had about 366,000 members organized in around 12,000 party cells.

The North Korean Bureau of the Communist Party of Korea and the New People's Party then merged into one party. The New People's Party had a significant following of intellectuals whereas the Communist Party was mainly based amongst workers and peasants. Moreover, the Korean communists had been riddled with internal differences, and different communist factions were present in the new unified party. At the time of the founding of the new party, discussions emerged on the role of Marxism–Leninism as the ideological foundation of the party. At the inaugural congress of the party, Kim Il Sung stated that "...the Workers Party is a combat unit and the vanguard of the working masses. We must fight with our utmost to maintain the Party's purity, unity, and iron discipline. If we were to fight against the enemy without meeting these conditions within our ranks, it would be nothing less than folly.", arguing in favor of maintaining a Marxist–Leninist orientation.

The remainder of the Communist Party of Korea, still functioning in the southern areas, worked under the name of Communist Party of South Korea. The party merged with the New People's Party of South Korea and the faction of the People's Party of Korea (the so-called forty-eighters), founding the Workers Party of South Korea on November 23, 1946.

The Workers Party of South Korea was outlawed in the South, but the party organized a network of clandestine cells and gained a considerable following. It had around 360,000 party members. The clandestine trade union movement, the All Korea Labor Union was connected to the party. In 1947, the party initiated an armed guerrilla struggle. As persecution intensified, large sections of the party leadership moved to Pyongyang. The party was opposed to the formation of a South Korean state. In February–March 1948 it instigated general strikes against plans to create a separate South Korean state. On April 3, 1948, the party led a popular uprising on Jeju Island, against the unilateral declaration of the foundation of the Republic of Korea. In the suppression of the revolt, thousands of islanders were killed.

=== Factional conflict ===
At the time, there were four separate tendencies or factions in the Workers Party of North Korea.

- The Soviet Koreans, led by Alexei Ivanovich Hegay, consisted of waves of ethnic Koreans born or raised in Russia after their families moved there starting in the 1870s. Some of them had returned to Korea covertly as Communist operatives in the twenties and thirties, but most were members of the Red Army or civilians who were stationed in North Korea following World War II. This grouping had played an important role in building up the party structure of the early Communist Party in Pyongyang directly after the Second World War.
- The Domestic faction was composed of Korean Communists who never left the country but engaged in the independence army. Prominent members of this faction were O Ki-sop, Chong Tal-hyon, Yi Chu-ha, Chu Nyong-ha (Vice Chairman of the party), Kim Yong-bom, Pak Chong-ae, Chang Shi-u and Yi Chu-yon. This grouping was politically tied to the old leadership of the Communist Party of Korea based in Seoul, at this point represented by the Workers Party of South Korea led by Pak Hon-yong.
- The Yanan faction, led first by Mu Chong and then by Kim Tu-bong and Choe Chang-ik, were those Korean exiles who had lived in China's Shaanxi province and joined the Chinese Communist Party, whose regional headquarters were at Yanan. They had formed their own party, the North-Chinese League for the Independence of Korea, and when they returned from exile to North Korea, they formed the New People's Party. Many members of the Yanan faction had fought in the Chinese 8th and New 4th Armies and thus had close relations with Mao Zedong.
- The Guerrilla faction, led by Kim Il Sung, was made up of former Korean guerrillas who had been active in Manchuria. Many in this group ended up fleeing Manchuria, as their armed resistance was suppressed, and moved to the Soviet Union, where many of them, including Kim, were drafted into the Red Army.

The factions were represented proportionately in the leading bodies of the WPNK. In the first politburo of the party, the Soviet Korean faction had three members, the Yanan faction had six, the domestic faction had two and the guerrilla faction had two. The guerrilla faction was actually the smallest of the fractions in the Central Committee but they had the advantage of having Kim Il Sung, who led the North Korean government and was highly influential within the party. Moreover, the Soviet Union backed Kim Il Sung.

=== Founding of the WPK ===
On June 30, 1949, the Workers' Party of North Korea and the Workers' Party of South Korea merged at a congress in Pyongyang to form the Workers' Party of Korea. Kim Il Sung became the party chairman and Pak Hon-yong and Alexei Ivanovich Hegay became vice chairmen. The other members of the first Politburo were Yi Sung-yop, Kim Sam-yong, Kim Ch aek, Kim Tu-Bong, Pak Il-u, and Pak Chong-ae. Kim Il Sung purged most of them.

The first five years of the WPK's rule were dominated by the Korean War. By October 1950, United Nations forces had occupied most of the DPRK and the WPK leadership had to flee to China. But, in November, North Korean and Chinese forces entered the war and threw the U.N. forces back, retaking Pyongyang in December and Seoul in January 1951. In March, U.N. forces retook Seoul, and the front was stabilized along what eventually became the permanent "Armistice Line" of 1953. The WPK re-established its rule north of this line.

=== Purges ===
According to Andrei Lankov, in the early years of the party, Kim Il Sung was the acknowledged leader, but he did not yet have absolute power since it was necessary to balance the interests of the various factions. To eliminate any threats to his position, he first moved against individual leaders who were potential rivals. He drove from power Alexei Ivanovich Hegay (also known as Ho Ka-ai), leader of the Soviet Korean faction, first demoting him during the Korean War in 1951 and then using him as a scapegoat for slow repairs of a water reservoir bombed by the Americans to drive him from power (and to an alleged suicide) in 1953.

Kim Il Sung also attacked the Yanan faction's leadership. Lankov says that when the North Koreans were driven to the Chinese border, Kim Il Sung needed a scapegoat to explain the military disaster and blamed Mu Chong, a leader of the Yanan faction and also a leader of the North Korean military. Mu Chong and a number of other military leaders were expelled from the party, and Mu was forced to return to China, where he spent the rest of his life. Kim Il Sung also removed Pak Il-u, the Minister of the Interior and reputedly the personal representative of Mao Zedong.

According to Lankov, as the Korean War drew to a close, Kim Il Sung first moved against the Domestic faction. With the end of the Korean War, the usefulness of the Domestic faction in running guerrilla and spy networks in South Korea came to an end. Former leaders of the Workers Party of South Korea were attacked at a December 1952 Central Committee meeting. In early 1953, rumours were spread that the "southerners" had been planning a coup. Lankov says that this led to the arrest and removal from power of Pak Hon-yong (who was foreign minister at the time) and Yi Sung-yop, the minister of "state control," who was charged with "spying on behalf of the Republic of Korea".

In August 1953, following the signing of the armistice that suspended the Korean War, Yi and eleven other leaders of the domestic faction were subjected to a show trial on charges of planning a military coup and sentenced to death. In 1955, Pak Hon-yong, the former leader of the WPSK and deputy chairman of the WPK, was put on trial on charges of having been a US agent since 1939, sabotage, assassination, and planning a coup. He was sentenced to death, although Lankov says it is unclear if he was shot immediately or if his execution occurred some time in 1956.

Lankov says that the trials of Yi and Pak were accompanied by the arrest of other members and activists of the former WPSK, with defendants being executed or sent to forced labour in the countryside. The domestic faction was virtually wiped out, though a few individual members who had personally allied themselves to Kim Il Sung remained in positions of influence for several more years.

=== Launching of Juche ===
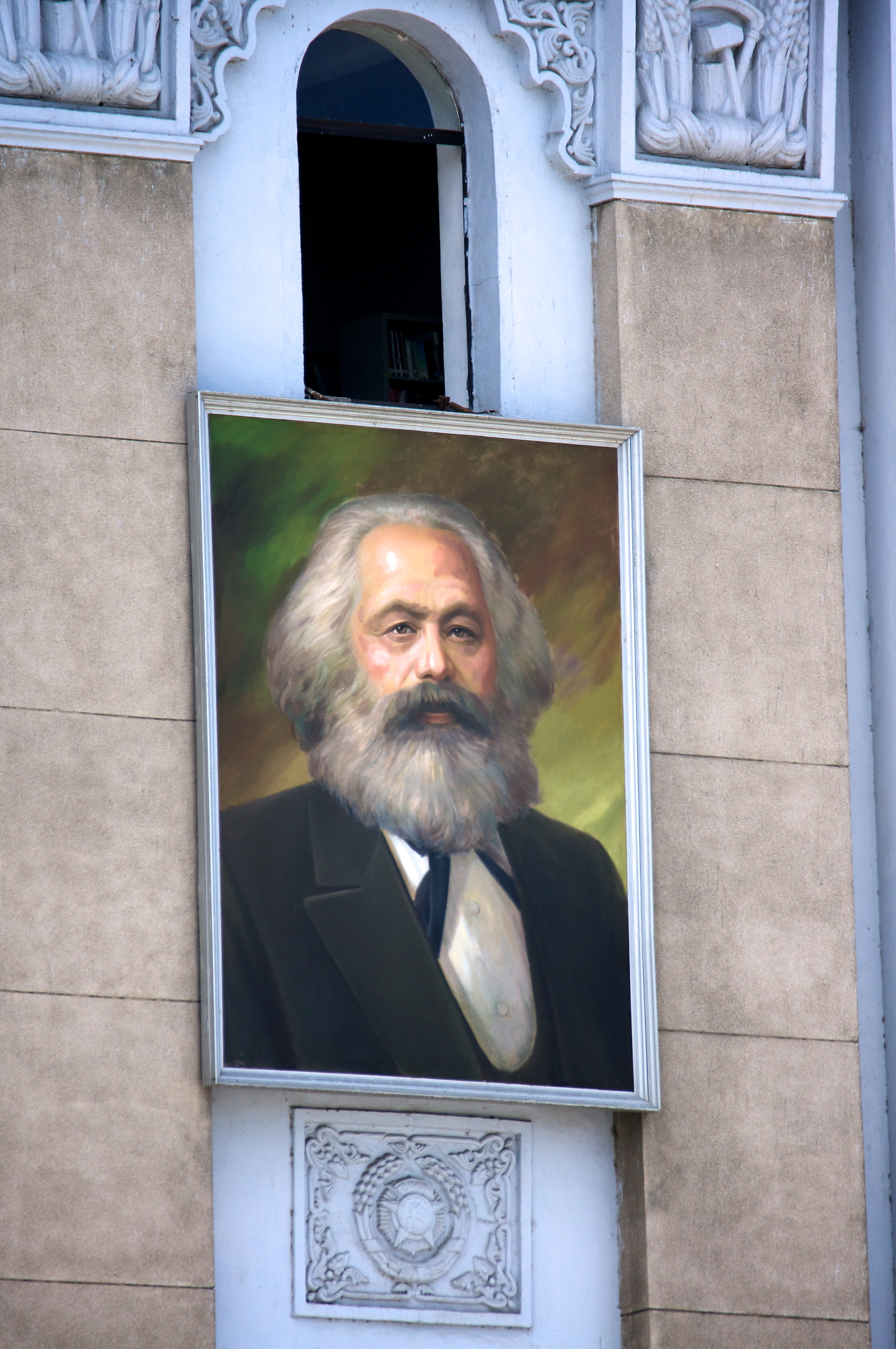
A portrait of Karl Marx on the wall of the Ministry of Foreign Trade. The portrait was removed in 2012 and reinstated in 2024.

Kim Il Sung advanced Juche as a slogan in a December 28, 1955, speech titled "On Eliminating Dogmatism and Formalism and Establishing Juche in Ideological Work". The Juche Idea itself gradually emerged as a systematic ideological doctrine under the political pressures of the Sino-Soviet split in the 1960s. The word "Juche" also began to appear in untranslated form in English-language North Korean works from around 1965. Kim Il Sung outlined the three fundamental principles of Juche in his April 14, 1965, speech "On Socialist Construction in the Democratic People's Republic of Korea and the South Korean Revolution". The principles are "independence in politics" (chaju), "self-sustenance in the economy" (charip) and "self-defense in national defense" (chawi).

WPK ideologues and speechwriters began to openly use Maoist ideas, such as the concept of self-regeneration, in the 1950s and 1960s. Maoist theories of art also began to influence North Korean musical theater during this time. These developments occurred with the backdrop of the Sino-Soviet split.

In official North Korean histories, one of the first purported applications of Juche was the Five-Year Plan of 1956–1961, also known as the Chollima Movement, which led to the Chongsan-ri Method and the Taean Work System. The Five-Year Plan involved rapid economic development of North Korea, with a focus on heavy industry. The Chollima Movement, however, applied the same method of centralized state planning that began with the Soviet first five-year plan in 1928.

In 1972, Juche replaced Marxism–Leninism in the revised North Korean constitution as the official state ideology, this being a response to the Sino-Soviet split. Juche was nonetheless defined as a creative application of Marxism–Leninism. Kim Il Sung also explained that Juche was not original to North Korea and that, in formulating it, he stressed only a programmatic orientation inherent to all Marxist–Leninist states.

Former North Korean leader Kim Jong Il officially authored the definitive statement on Juche in a 1982 document titled On the Juche Idea. After the 1991 collapse of the Soviet Union, North Korea's greatest economic benefactor, the revised 1992 constitution dropped all references to Marxism–Leninism. Kim Jong Il incorporated the Songun (army-first) policy into Juche in 1996. The communist-style central leadership structure would be removed from the North Korean government in the revised 1998 constitution, which abolished both the office of President and the Central People's Committee and transferred their powers to the Presidium of the Supreme People's Assembly and the Cabinet. In contrast to the previous authority of the ruling Workers' Party of Korea (WPK) leadership, the 1998 constitutional amendment also redirected supreme state power leadership to those who lead the North Korean military; despite redirecting supreme leadership to the North Korean military, the language of the 1998 amendment did not call for the WPK to be abolished.

In 2009, all references to communism were removed from the North Korean Constitution. In 2012, North Korea took down portraits of Karl Marx and Vladimir Lenin from the walls of the Ministry of Foreign Trade. However, in January 2021, the WPK reasserted its commitment to communism. In 2024, the newly opened Central Cadres Training School of the Workers' Party of Korea displayed portraits of Marx and Lenin.

== See also ==
- Anarchism in Korea
- Kim Il Sung
