= Communist Korea =

Communist Korea may refer to:

- Communism in Korea
- Soviet Civil Administration
- Provisional People's Committee for North Korea
- Democratic People's Republic of Korea, commonly known as "North Korea"
- People's Republic of Korea
- Communist Party of Korea
- Workers' Party of Korea
  - Workers' Party of North Korea
  - Workers' Party of South Korea
- History of North Korea
