= North Korean Branch Bureau =

1945–1946 North Korean political party

- Emblem of the Workers' Party of North Korea

13 October 1945 – 30 August 1946 (321 days) Overview
- Type: Executive Committee of the North Korean Branch Bureau
- Election: Conference of Korean Communist Party Members and Enthusiasts in the Five Northwestern Provinces

Leadership
- First Secretary: Kim Il Sung; Kim Yong-bom
- Second Secretary: O Ki-sop

Members
- Total: 14

Apparatus
- Head of General Affairs: Pak Chong-ho
- No. of departments: 9

The North Korean Branch Bureau (NKBB) of the Communist Party of Korea (CPK; Korean: 조선공산당북조선분국) was established by a CPK conference on 13 October 1945. It evolved into the Communist Party of North Korea (Korean: 북조선공산당) on 10 April 1946 and became independent of the CPK. It was through the merger with New People's Party of Korea replaced by the 1st Central Committee of the Workers' Party of North Korea on 30 August 1946.

== Background ==
In the days following Japan's surrender on 14 August 1945, several communist organisations were created. The first notable attempt was established on either 15, 16 or 17 August, and a public declaration was released on 18 August by the "Seoul District of the Communist Party of Korea". This group would go down in history as the Changan Group (장안파 조선공산당), and its leading figures were Choe Ik-han, Yi Yong, Cho Tong-ho and Hyon Chun-hyok. An invitation to join the Central Committee of the Changan group was sent to Pak Hon-yong, but the invitation was declined on 19 August. He instead opted to form the Preparatory Committee for the Reconstruction of the Communist Party of Korea (PCR–CPK) and called for the dissolution of the Changan group. The PCR–CPK supported the theory of two-stage revolution, the idea that Korea had to undergo a bourgeoisie democratic revolution before starting a socialist one. Moreover, the PCR–CPK sought to form a people's front under the leadership of the Communist Party of Korea (CPK) to seize power.

On 8 September a meeting composed of representatives from the PCR–CPK, the Changan group and the fairly small Red Flag group was convened. The Changan group were outnumbered three to one and therefore sought to downplay the meeting's importance. Pak Hon-yong told the gathering that the communist movement needed to unite, and wanted those that had "engaged in the underground activity" to lead the party. Nevertheless, Pak Hon-yong said that individuals who had renounced communism during their imprisonment should not take leading party positions. This was a dig at the Changan group, in which several high-standing members had recanted their communist beliefs while imprisoned. Choe Ik-han of the Changan group reacted by criticising the meeting's proposals as being "reformist, economist, and anarchistic". Pak Hon-yong retorted that the proposals laid the groundwork for establishing "a great Bolshevik party combining the revolutionary intelligentsia who have mastered revolutionary theory with the workers who have weathered the experience of the actual movement." The meeting passed three resolutions; on approving Pak Hon-yong's report, on convening a party congress and delegating final authority in picking party personnel to Pak Hon-yong. The Changan group opposed the resolutions.

On 11–14 September the Refounding Congress of the CPK was held, and elected Pak Hon-yong Chairman of a 31-strong Central Committee. The program adopted by the congress opposed cooperation with the landlords and the capitalist class. It claimed those that did collaborate were "joining hands with reactionary fascists to organise the so-called Korean Democratic Party and other associations to deceive the people." The following day, on 15 September, an Enlarged Plenary Session of the South Pyongan Provincial Committee of the Changan group in North Korea (led by Hyon Chun-hyok) criticised CPK's policies. They claimed that the CPK's attitude towards the United Kingdom and the United States was "ambiguous", and believed its posture towards the "democratic camp" led by the Soviet Union was light-hearted. Political scientist Robert Scalapino and Chong-sik Lee theorise that this criticism was actually levelled by the Soviets but was communicated through the Hyon Chun-hyok group since it was the only prominent communist organisation in North Korea at the time.

Shortly after, on 19 September 1945, Kim Il Sung and his partisan unit returned to Korea. Scholar Hak Soon Paik writes that "The Soviet army appears to have taken step-by-step measures to undermine the power bases of the local Communists and to render Kim Il-sung all kinds of assistance in taking over the leadership of the Communist [organisations] in North Korea." In tandem with Kim Il Sung's arrival, a group of card-carrying members of the Communist Party of the Soviet Union with Korean ethnicity arrived. This group would later be dubbed the Soviet Korean faction and would play a pivotal role in Kim Il Sung's consolidation of power. The Soviets helped Kim Il Sung organise the Proposers' Committee for the Provincial Party Organisations in North Korea on either 29 or 30 September, and on either 1 or 8 October they organised a meeting between him and Pak Hon-yong. They discussed the possibility of establishing a separate communist organisation in North Korea but Pak Hon-yong opposed the scheme. Soviet Major General Andrei Romanenko chipped in and took Kim Il Sung's side, and advised them to establish a North Korean Branch Bureau (NKBB) under the CPK. Pak Hon-yong conceded to the demands on one condition; that the bureau would be subordinate to the CPK Central Committee. Hak Soon Paik contends that this turn of events is proof of "the Soviet army's policy, from the beginning, to set up an independent party organ in the North." With the two leading Korean communists in agreement, the Soviets organised the Conference of Korean Communist Party Members and Enthusiasts in the Five Northwestern Provinces (CKCPMEFNP, 북조선 5도당책임자 및 열성자 대회) on 10–13 October 1945.

== Conference of Members and Enthusiasts in the Five Northwestern Provinces ==
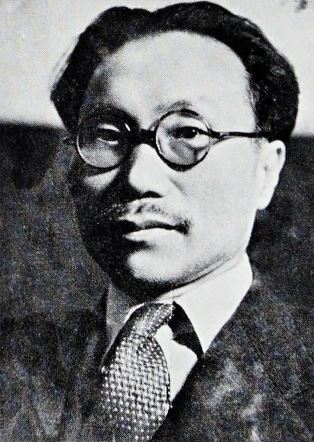
O Ki-sop became the leading oppositionist within the NKBB (and the Korean communist movement) until the 1st Congress of the Workers' Party of North Korea.

In light of the agreement between Kim Il Sung and Pak Hon-yong, the CKCPMEFNP was convened with support from the leading centres of the Korean communist movement. However, a conflict between indigenous communists, classified as belonging to the domestic faction, began to work against Kim Il Sung when it became clear he sought complete independence from the CPK. This struggle would culminate with Kim Il Sung's speech to the 2nd Congress of the Workers' Party of North Korea, in which he criticised the domestic faction and fellow communist O Ki-sop directly. However, at the conference, Kim Il Sung was still careful of confronting the CPK and Pak Hon-yong in line with the aforementioned agreement.

=== Debate on front strategy and tendencies of right and left ===
Two different lines were articulated at the conference. O Ki-sop, the representative of the Pak Hon-yong line, espoused the idea of a popular front while Kim Il Sung and his supported advocated a national united front strategy. The Pak Hon-yong overall line was adopted by the conference, but a compromise was reached in several areas. Kim Il Sung's national united front strategy explicitly called for an alliance with the capitalist class and the landlords, while the popular front line opposed this. While this line had to be supported by his Soviet allies evidence points to the fact that Kim Il Sung had held this stance during his time as a partisan fighter. However, for Kim Il Sung this was nothing more than a tactic. He still emphasised the importance of maintaining the proletarian leadership in such an alliance, while frankly admitting that the North Korean communist movement was weak and the capitalist class powerful. On the other hand, O Ki-sop called for the establishment of a "united, people's self-reliant republic". He never mentioned capitalists and landlords in his speech, but warned against bringing pro-Japanese, pro-imperialist and reactionaries into the popular front. This was in direct opposition to Kim Il Sung's more inclusive line, and O Ki-sop went further and called for the "construction of a new nation by selected Communists." Kim Il Sung would later criticise O Ki-sop for his stance at the 2nd Party Congress in 1948, stating that the belief that the national united front strategy "would give the party a setback [and] make the party rightist-oriented" was wrong. This part of the debate produced the document "Resolution on the Establishment of the Political Line and the Expansion and Strengthening of the Organisation". Most of Kim Il Sung's suggestions featured in the document, but his united national front strategy was not mentioned at all.

Otherwise, there were the points of agreements. Both O Ki-sop and Kim Il Sung harshly criticised left and right communism and specifically accused the Changan group of practising Trotskyism. However, as with the front strategy, Kim Il Sung was more flexible and inclusive than O Ki-sop. Kim Il Sung suggested that these communists could join the NKBB and CKP if they repented for their actions and were willing to learn from the errors. No such stance was articulated by O Ki-sop. Despite Kim Il Sung's stance, the conference passed the resolution "Criticism Against the Leftist Tendency and Its Sectarian Activities" in a bid to support Pak Hon-yong in his struggle against the Changan group.

=== Organisation debate ===
While both O Ki-sop and Kim Il Sung recognised Pak Hon-yong's leadership and achievements, Kim Il Sung was critical of the CPK and considered it a "failure". He criticised the party's problem with factionalism and told the gathering that it was "only two months old", refusing to give age-old legitimacy. As for the party's democratic norms and structure, both O Ki-sop and Kim Il Sung talked about the need for democratic centralism and the importance of Marxist–Leninist beliefs. However, Kim Il Sung stated his opposition to "excessive democracy in which [too] many people participate in discussing all matters", thereby calling for the centralisation of power. O Ki-sop for that matter never criticised the CPK, and called for a standing ovation to Pak Hon-yong at the conference while finishing his report with "Long live the CPK" and in support with the party's national policies "Long live the Sovereignty of the Korean People's Republic." In line with his critical stance, Kim Il Sung called the conference to discuss the following points;

1. establishing the NKBB;
2. writing party rules;
3. issuing of party membership documents;
4. the convocation of an All-National Congress of the CPK.

Political scientist Hak Soon Paik writes "I believe that Kim Il-sung clearly took the initiative in the Korean Communist movement by introducing such critical issues of the party [at the conference]." The CPK, being plagued by factionalism, had failed to establish party rules, create membership cards and formalising the party structure. To take an example, the CPK had failed to establish a structure that issued party documents so the initiative shown by Kim Il Sung meant "a great deal" for certain segments in the party. Kim Il Sung proposed to the conference that "If it is technically difficult for the Center to print party membership certificates, let us issue them in north Korea under the approval of the [CPK Central Committee]." The conference passed a draft of party rules, and on Kim Il Sung's suggestion sent it to Seoul to "help" the CPK leadership. The conference unanimously approved "the work in Seoul be assisted by proposing to the [CPK Central Committee] that the draft be decided by the center and printing and other technical matters be carried out in Pyongyang." That is, the NKBB which had been established as a subordinate organ of the CPK took the role of assistant to the CPK Central Committee. Despite this, Kim Il Sung moved carefully and the conference voted unanimously for adding the following text to its internal regulation; "Whenever the [CPK Central Committee] recognises the need of betterment such as reform, etc., the [CPK Central Committee] reserves the right to act accordingly and the Branch Bureau has the duty to obey."

Kim Il Sung called for the convocation of an All-National Congress of the CPK "[to empower the party] cadres who would be elected through [party] action programs, party certificates, party rules and party democracy." He indirectly mentioned the support he had from the Soviet Union, and stated "[that] the Party Congress should be [the one] that will receive the support of the international brother [communist] parties". In this section of the debate, and in the conference more generally, all of Kim Il Sung's proposals were adopted unanimously. This means that even the representatives of the CPK Central Committee led by Pak Hon-yong fully endorsed his leadership of conference proceedings.

=== Election of the Executive Committee ===
The last item of the proceeding was to elect the composition of the NKBB Executive Committee (which took place on 13 October 1945). 15 individuals drawn from Pyongyang and five provinces were elected to the Executive Committee. The identity of one member remains unknown to this day. 10 members had a background in the indigenous communist movement, and two (Kim Il Sung and An Kil) were former partisans. However, this does not mean that Kim Il Sung was in a clear minority in the Executive Committee. Besides Kim Il Sung and O Ki-sop, the two other leading communists Pak Chong-ae and Kim Yong-bom supported Kim Il Sung and the Soviet line. Besides 71 percent of Executive Committee members having a domestic background that did not mean their position was anti-Kim or critical of him in any way.

At a later date, at the 1st Plenary Session of the Executive Committee, a Standing Committee was elected. The same plenum elected Kim Yong-bom as the First Secretary of the Executive Committee and O Ki-sop as Second Secretary of the Executive Committee There are also reports that Mu Chong was elected to a high-ranking position, but it seems unlikely that those rumours are true. At last, nine Executive Committee departments were established and nine department heads appointed.

== Plenary sessions ==
Plenum	Start–end	Length	Agenda
Conference of Members and Enthusiasts	10–13 October 1945	4 days	2 items.: North Korean version–that this meeting marked the establishment of the Workers' Party of Korea.; Report by Kim Il Sung on organisational concerns.; Election of an Organisation Committee.; South Korean version—that is meeting marked the establishment NKBB.; The forming of the North Korea Branch Bureau of the Communist Party of Korea; Election of party secretaries: Kim Yong-bom elected as First Secretary and O Ki-sop as Second Secretary.
1st Enlarged Plenary Session	15 November 1945	1 day	1 item.: On problems faced while enlarging and strengthening the Democratic National United Front.; Reorganising the CPK Communist Youth League in North Korea into the Democratic Youth League.
2nd Enlarged Plenary Session	17–18 December 1945	2 days	3 items.: Report by Kim Il-sung on mistakes and deficiencies in communist activities.; Election of a Secretary.; Kim Il Sung elected.
3rd Enlarged Plenary Session	15 February 1946	1 day	1 item.: On improving the Provisional People's Committee of North Korea.
4th Plenary Session	Not made public.	Not made public.	Not made public.
5th Enlarged Plenary Session	10 April 1946	1 day	1 item.: Report by Kim Il-sung, known as "General Summation of the Land Reform and the Future Tasks".
6th Enlarged Plenary Session	22–23 June 1946	2 days	Not made public.
7th Enlarged Plenary Session	27–29 July 1946	1 day	2 items.: Report by Kim Tu-bong, the Chairman of the New People's Party of Korea, and a report by Kim Il-sung.; Debate on party rules and party platform of the new party.; The release of "Declaration Concerning the Coalition of the New Democratic Party and the North Korean Branch Bureau of the Communist Party of Korea to Found the Workers' Party of North Korea".

== Officers ==
=== First Secretary ===
Title	Officeholder	Hangul	Birth	Death	Took office	Left office	Duration
First Secretary of the Executive Committee of the North Korean Branch Bureau of the Communist Party of Korea	Kim Yong-bom	김용범	1902	1947	13 October 1945	18 December 1945	66 days
First Secretary of the Executive Committee of the North Korean Branch Bureau of the Communist Party of Korea	Kim Il Sung	김일성	1912	1994	18 December 1945	2 May 1946	135 days
First Secretary of the Central Committee of the Communist Party of North Korea	Kim Il Sung	김일성	1912	1994	2 May 1946	30 August 1946	120 days

=== Second Secretary ===
Title	Officeholder	Hangul	Birth	Death	Took office	Left office	Duration
Second Secretary of the Executive Committee of the North Korean Branch Bureau of the Communist Party of Korea	O Ki-sop	오기섭	1903	NDDK	13 October 1945	January 1946	80 days
Second Secretary of the Executive Committee of the North Korean Branch Bureau of the Communist Party of Korea	Kim Yong-bom	김용범	1902	1947	January 1946	2 May 1946	121 days
Second Secretary of the Central Committee of the Communist Party of North Korea	Kim Yong-bom	김용범	1902	1947	2 May 1946	30 August 1946	120 days

== Department ==
Department	Head	Hangul	Term start	Term end	Background
Cadre Department	Yi Tong-hwa	이통화	13 October 1945	30 August 1946	Soviet
Education Department	Han Sol-ya	한설야	13 October 1945	30 August 1946	Domestic
General Affairs Department	Pak Chong-ho	박종호	13 October 1945	30 August 1946	Domestic
Labour Department	Choe Kyong-dok	최경독	13 October 1945	30 August 1946	Domestic
Peasant Department	Yi Sun-jik	이순직	13 October 1945	30 August 1946	Domestic
Propaganda Department	Kim Kyo-yong	김교용	13 October 1945	30 August 1946	Domestic
Organisation Department	Chu Yong-ha	주영하	13 October 1945	18 December 1945	Domestic
Organisation Department	Ho Ka-i	허가이	18 December 1945	30 August 1946	Soviet
Women Department	Pak Chong-ae	박정애	13 October 1945	30 August 1946	Domestic
Youth Department	Kim Uk-chin	김욱진	13 October 1945	30 August 1946	Domestic

== Members ==
Name	Hangul	1st CC	Background				
Name	Hangul	1st CC	Background	An Kil	안길	Elected	Partisan
Chang Chong-sik	장종식	Elected	Domestic				
Chang sun-myong	장선명	Elected	Domestic				
Choe Kyong-dok	최경독	Elected	Domestic				
Chu Yong-ha	주영하	Elected	Domestic				
Kang Chin-gon	강진곤	Elected	Domestic				
Kim Il Sung	김일성	Elected	Partisan				
Kim Kyo-yong	김교용	Elected	Domestic				
Kim Ung-gi	김웅기	Not	Domestic				
Kim Yong-bom	김용범	Not	Domestic				
O Ki-sop	오기섭	Elected	Domestic				
Pak Chong-ae	박정애	Elected	Domestic				
Song Pong-ok	송퐁옥	Not	Domestic				
Yi Sun-jik	이순직	Not	Domestic				
