= Kim Yong-bom =

North Korean politician (1902–1947)

- 김용범(金鎔範)

Chairman of the Central Inspection Commission of the Workers' Party of North Korea
- In office 31 August 1946 – 7 September 1947
- Preceded by: Office established
- Succeeded by: Chang Sun-myong

General Secretary of the Communist Party of Korea
- In office 13 October 1945 – 18 December 1946
- Preceded by: Office established
- Succeeded by: Kim Tu-bong

Personal details
- Born: 18 August 1902 Chongnam, South Pyongan Province, Korean Empire
- Died: 7 September 1947 (aged 45) North Korea
- Party: Workers' Party of North Korea (since 1946)
- Other political affiliations: Communist Party of Korea (1925–1928, 1945–1946)
- Spouse: Pak Chong-ae

Military service
- Allegiance: North Korea

Kim Yong-bom (18 August 1902 – 7 September 1947) was a North Korean revolutionary and politician who became one of the leaders of the Communist Party of Korea between 1945 and 1946.

In the early 1930s, Kim studied at the Communist University of the Toilers of the East in Moscow, where he met the communist and feminist organizer Pak Chong-ae. Kim and Pak would return to Korea in 1932 "in disguise as a couple" and later went on to marry. He was made Secretary of the North Korean Branch Bureau of the Communist Party of Korea in 1945 after the assassination of Hyŏn Chunhyŏk. This makes Kim the first leader of the current-day Workers' Party of Korea.
