= Pak Chong-ae =

20th-century North Korean politician

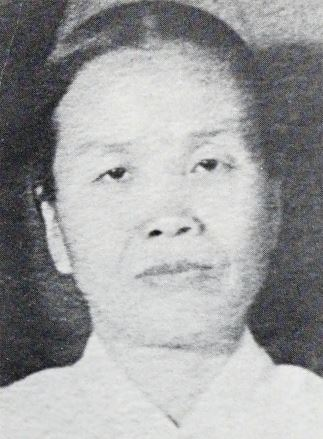

Vice Chair of the Workers' Party of Korea Central Committee
- In office 6 August 1953 – 18 September 1961 Serving with Pak Chang-ok, Kim Il, Pak Yong-bin, Pak Kum-chol, Choe Yong-gon, Chong Il-yong and Kim Chang-man.

Minister of Agriculture

2nd term
- In office October 1961 – 23 October 1962
- Preceded by: Yim Hae
- Succeeded by: Kim Man-gum

Personal details
- Born: 1907 North Hamgyong Province, Korean Empire
- Died: Sometime in or after 1986
- Party: Workers' Party of Korea
- Other political affiliations: Workers' Party of North Korea
- Spouse: Kim Yong-bom
- Children: Pak Sun-hui
- Awards: International Stalin Prize (1950), Order of the National Flag (1st and 2nd class)

Korean name
- Hangul: 박정애
- Hanja: 朴正愛
- RR: Bak Jeongae
- MR: Pak Chŏngae

Pak Chong-ae (Korean: 박정애; born Ch'oe Vera 1907 – ?, also known as Pak Den-ai, was a North Korean politician.

Pak represented the Workers' Party of North Korea (WPNK) and after 1949 the unified Workers' Party of Korea (WPK). She was already an experienced communist at the time of the liberation of Korea, and she had also studied in the Soviet Union and worked for its intelligence service. She is grouped variously among either the Soviet or the Domestic faction of the party.

Pak was the first chairperson of the North Korean Central Committee of the Korean Democratic Women's League, the country's mass organization for women. During her chairwomanship the League had not yet developed into an organization through which the government tightly controls its citizens.

Pak is the only woman to have served in the Politburo of the Workers' Party of Korea until the appointment of Kim Yo Jong. She has been characterized as being the only woman ever to have been truly important in the WPK. Her career in North Korean politics stretched from the 1940s until her purge in 1966 which resulted in her expulsion to countryside. From there on she was allowed to hold minor positions only.

Pak was awarded with the International Stalin Prize in 1950.

== Life and career ==
Pak was born in 1907 in North Hamgyong Province, Korean Empire. She went to the Soviet Union to study in the Moscow State University. She then worked for the Soviet Union as an intelligence agent before entering politics. In the early 1930s, she was dispatched to Korea for duty, where the Japanese authorities imprisoned her.

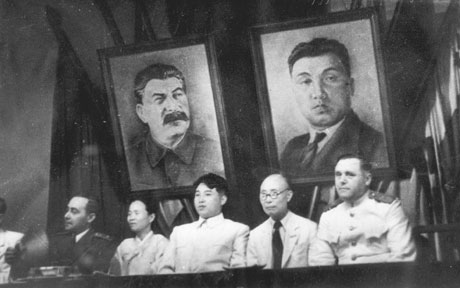
Pak (third from left) at the 1st Congress of the WPNK on 28 August 1946, two days before becoming a full member of its first Central Committee.

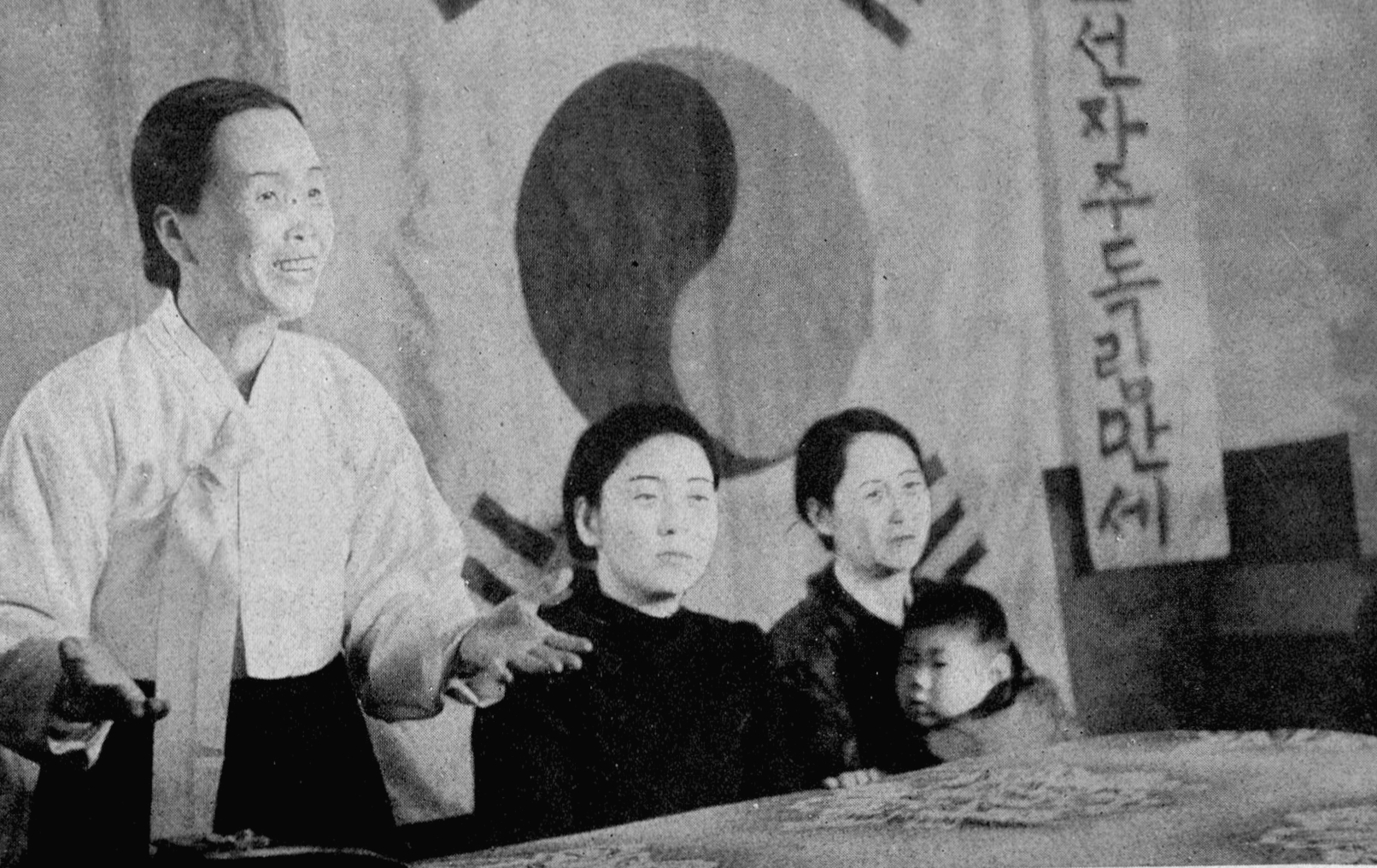
Pak Chong-ae speaks at a rally for the local elections in North Korea held on 3 November 1946.

During the 1940s, Pak was married to Kim Yong-bom, chairman of the North Korean Branch Bureau of the Korean Communist Party. At the time of the liberation of Korea, Pak was already considered an experienced domestic communist. She supported Kim Il Sung in the early days of North Korean political life and became one of his strongest supporters. In August 1946, she became a full member of the 1st Central Committee of the Workers' Party of North Korea (WPNK). When the Workers' Parties of North and South Korea merged to form the Workers' Party of Korea (WPK) in 1949, Pak was chosen as one of its three secretaries. She served in its 2nd, 3rd, and 4th Central Committees. She was also a deputy to the Supreme People's Assembly.

It is possible that Pak informed the Chinese about North Korea's plans to attack South Korea just prior to the outbreak of the Korean War.

In 1953, she headed the North Korean delegation to Stalin's funeral in Moscow, where her Chinese counterpart was the Foreign Minister Zhou Enlai. Later that year, she participated in a purge against the former South Korean Workers' Party members who had fallen out of Kim Il Sung's favor. Pak became one of five members, and the only woman, in a Political Committee that solidified Kim's rule. Pak was highly influential within the committee and was one of Kim's closest confidantes. She was present when he signed the Armistice document and also accompanied him on trips abroad. As one of the most important members of the committee she was uniquely "able to advise Kim Il-sŏng on his personal life, and to speak for women as well as on matters of general concern".

She was the first chairperson of the North Korean Central Committee of the Korean Democratic Women's League. During her tenure, lasting from the 1940s to 1965, the league was a typical women's mass organization not unlike those in other countries. It was only under subsequent chairpersons that it acquired more totalitarian features. Pak also played a leading role in the Women's International Democratic Federation (WIDF). She was a member of its executive committee in 1948. In 1951, a WIDF International Commission of Women visited North Korea on her initiative to mobilize the world public opinion. She received the International Stalin Prize in 1950 and also starred in Joris Ivens and Jerzy Bossak's anti-war documentary film Peace Will Win. She has also revived the North Korean Order of the National Flag, both first and second class.

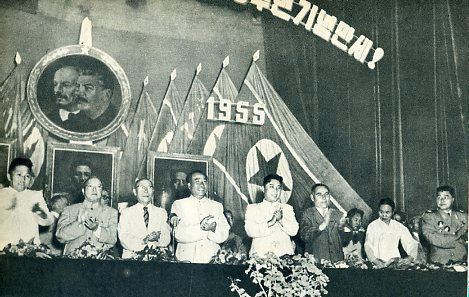
From left to right: Pak Chang-ok, Li Jishen, Kim Tu-bong, Zhu De, Kim Il Sung, Averky Aristov, Pak Chong-ae, and Choe Yong-gon in 1955.

Robert A. Scalapino and Lee Chong-Sik call her "the only woman ever to have been truly important in the [WPK]". She lasted in mid-century North Korean political life when purges removed many other senior politicians. Andrei Lankov describes her as "one of the most remarkable personalities of that remarkable era". From 1961 to 1963 she was North Korea's Minister of Agriculture, as of 2000 one of only six North Korean women to have served as ministers. Pak was also the only woman to have served in the Politburo of the Workers' Party of Korea, the highest decision-making body of the party, until Kim Yo Jong.

Pak herself was purged by Kim at the 2nd Conference of the WPK in October 1966. The conference saw purges of mostly officials in charge of economic affairs, but Pak was not one of them, implying that she was purged because of Kim's desire to concentrate power. Pak was expelled to the countryside after the purge. She resurfaced in public life in 1986. Her influence had been greatly weakened by then and she was allowed to hold minor positions only. Her daughter, Pak Sun-hui, is the current chairperson of the central committee of the Korean Democratic Women's League.

== See also ==
- History of the Workers' Party of Korea
- Kim Sung-ae
- Women in the North Korean Revolution
