= New People's Party of Korea =

1946 political party in North Korea

New People's Party of Korea 조선신민당 朝鮮新民黨
- Leader: Kim Jae-bong; Kang Dal-young; Kim Tu-Bong
- Founded: 16 February 1946
- Dissolved: 23 November 1946
- Merged into: WPNK; WPSK
- Headquarters: Pyongyang
- Newspaper: Chonjin
- Ideology: Communism; Marxism–Leninism; Chinese Model
- Political position: Far-left

The New People's Party of Korea (Korean: 조선신민당; Hanja: 朝鮮新民黨) was a short-lived Marxist-Leninist communist party in the People's Republic of Korea. It was formed in Pyongyang on 16 February 1946 by Korean Communists who had been exiled in China, later known as the Yan'an faction. The New People's Party had more moderate positions in some issues compared with the Communist Party of Korea, therefore it was rather popular with a wide range of Korean people. The leader of the party was Kim Tu-bong.

== History ==
The party was formed on 16 February 1946 by Kim Tu-bong and Korean Communists who had been exiled in China. It was formerly known as the Independence League. On 22 July 1946 the Communist Party of North Korea joined with the New People's Party, the Democratic Party and the Party of Young Friends of the Celestial Way (supporters of an influential religious sect) to form the United Democratic National Front which put all of North Korea's parties under the "leading role" of the Communists.

Then, based on Soviet leader Joseph Stalin's direct orders, on 29 July 1946, the Communist Party of North Korea and the New People's Party held a joint plenum of the Central Committees of both parties and agreed to merge into a single entity. A founding conference was held on 28–30 August, where the united party adopted the name Workers' Party of North Korea. The new party had a membership of more than 170,000 with 134,000 coming from the Communist Party of North Korea and 35,000 from the New People's Party.

Similarly, on 23 November 1946, the remaining members of the New People's Party, the Communist Party of Korea and a fraction of the People's Party of Korea (the so-called 'forty-eighters') merged to form the Workers' Party of South Korea led by Pak Hon-yong. On 30 June 1949 the Workers' Party of North Korea and Workers' Party of South Korea merged to form the Workers' Party of Korea.

== See also ==
- Division of Korea
- Provisional Government of the Republic of Korea, from 1914 to 1948
- Timeline of Korean history
