= Communist Party of Korea =

1925–1946 political party in Korea

Communist Party of Korea 조선공산당 Chosŏn Kongsandang
- Leaders: Kim Jae-bong; Kang Dal-young; Pak Hon-yong
- Founded: 17 April 1925; 101 years ago (Note: The original party was refounded in September 1945.)
- Dissolved: 23 November 1946; 79 years ago (Note: The original party disbanded in December 1928.)
- Preceded by: Tuesday Society
- Succeeded by: Workers' Party of South Korea
- Headquarters: Seoul (1925–1928, 1945–1946)
- Ideology: Communism; Marxism-Leninism
- Political position: Far-left
- International affiliation: Comintern

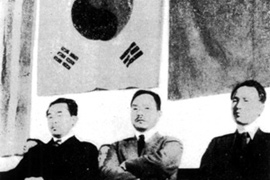
Leaders of the Communist Party of Korea in 1946

The Communist Party of Korea (Korean: 조선공산당; Hanja: 朝鮮共產黨; MR: Chosŏn Kongsandang) was a Marxist-Leninist party in Korea founded during a secret meeting in Seoul in 1925. The Governor-General of Korea had banned communist and socialist parties under the Peace Preservation Law so the party had to operate in a clandestine manner. The leaders of the party were Kim Yong-bom and Pak Hon-yong.

After Kim Il Sung transformed the northern branch of the party into the Communist Party of North Korea, he led the foundation of the Workers' Party of North Korea. Pak Hon-yong led the foundation of the Workers' Party of South Korea.

== Foundation ==
The first attempt to organise a communist party within Korea, rather than in Russia or China, was by Chŏng Chae-dal in 1923, but he was arrested in 1924.

Kim Chae-bong intended to hold the founding congress of the Communist Party of Korea (CPK) on 21 April 1925, during a meeting of the General Congress of All-Korean Workers for the Mass Movement. On 17 April the CPK was established by 15 people at Ya Shue Yuen, a Chinese restaurant in Seoul. This date was chosen to coincide with the All-Korea Press Reporters' Conference, which the Japanese police would be focused on rather than communist activity. A Central Executive Committee (CEC) with seven members and a three-member Central Inspection Committee was organised. The CEC met in the home of Kim Ch'an on 18 April and elected Kim Chae-bong as chair.

Cho Tong-ho was put in charge of making a draft constitution and bylaws for the party, and was sent to the Soviet Union in May 1925 to get official recognition from the Communist International, which it received in May 1926. The Executive Committee of the Communist International endorsed the admission of the CPK into the Communist International between the 6th and 7th Plenums held in March and December 1926. The CPK was admitted at the 6th World Congress of the Communist International on 1 September 1928. Multiple groups reformed the party and were arrested during the period between the ECCI's endorsement and the CPK's admission. However, the feuds between rival factions that had plagued the party from its foundation led the Comintern to disband the party in December 1928.

The Shinman Youth Society sponsored a wedding party in Sinuiju on 15 November. Several communists, including Tokko Chon and Kim Kyong-so, attended the party and became involved in a brawl with Japanese police in which they made their political views clear. The Japanese police managed to find several party documents and communist materials in the suspect's home. The Japanese police arrested an estimated 100 individuals and convicted 83 for illegally establishing a communist organisation.

Kim Chae-bong escaped the mass arrests, but believed that he would eventually be arrested. He and other leaders in the CPK decided to prepare the party in case of them being arrested. Kang Tal-yǒng was made the head of the party on 13 December 1925, and Kim Chae-bong was arrested on 19 December. Kang moved to Seoul to take up his position in February 1926. He reduced the six committees of the CEC to three: Secretariat, Organizational, and Propaganda. He established bureaus in Jiandao, Shanghai, and Tokyo for leaders who fled to these places. By March 1926, the CPK had 130 members.

Sunjong of Korea died on 25 April 1926, and his funeral resulted in the June Tenth Movement. The CPK planned to print 50,000 flyers, which focused on anti-Japanese messaging and did not mention communism, for the event. Kwon O-sǒl, leader of the CPK's youth association, led the party's involvement in the June Tenth Movement, and around 160 communists, including Kwon O-sǒl, were arrested during it. Kang Tal-yǒng was arrested in Seoul on 17 July.

== Reforming the party ==
=== January Association and Seoul Youth Association ===
The January Association was organised by students in January 1925, and was led by An Kwang-ch'ǒn. The Declaration of Chǒng-u-hoe was issued by the January Association on 15 November 1926. This document proposed that communists reject small cliques and underground organisations and instead form a united front with nationalists. Communists from the Seoul Youth Association (Seoul faction), led by Yi Yong, opposed this.

A Second Party Congress was held on 6 December 1926 to reorganise the CPK. The January Association, Shanghai faction, and younger members of the Seoul Youth Association formed a new party. The January Association did not have a majority on the CEC, which was led by the communists from Shanghai. However, the Shanghai faction could not govern without the January Association and Kim Chun-yon, a member of the January Association, became the leader. He sent agents to Manchuria, Shanghai, and Vladivostok and recruited around 300 members. Kim Chun-yon resigned after assassination attempts by the Seoul Youth Association. Two party members were arrested in November 1927, and this led to a mass arrest of 32 members on 2 February 1928.

On 27 February 1928, 12 delegates representing 8 provinces in Japan and Manchuria assembled in the house of Kim Pyǒng-gwan near Seoul to reform the party. The first CEC meeting was held in March and selected Ch'a Kŭm-bong as party secretary. Han Myǒng-ch'an and members of the CEC were arrested on 5 July 1928, and the police discovered the journal in Han Myǒng-ch'an's house listing the names of party officials. Around 175 people were arrested in raids from 20 to 22 August. Ch'a Kŭm-bong was arrested and murdered in prison.

Other attempts to reform the communist party were also unsuccessful. An attempt by Pak Hyǒng-byǒng resulted in him and 50 people being arrested in Pyongyang on 21 April 1928. Yi Yong called for a party congress, but he and 16 other people were arrested on 17 June. After 1928, the CPK would not be properly reestablished until after World War II.

=== Singanhoe ===
The Communist International pushed for Korean communists to form a united front with nationalists. Communist groups, such as the Tuesday Society, North Wind Society, Korean Labor Party, and Proletarian League voluntarily dissolved themselves in 1926. Nationalists formed Singanhoe with Japanese permission on 19 January 1927. The CPK told its members to join Singanhoe. Singanhoe had 37,000 to 76,000 members by 1930.

By 1930 there were two communist groups in Korea, the Seoul faction and the Marxist-Leninist Group (which was formed by members of the January Association). Ko Kyǒng-hŭm, a leader in the Marxist-Leninist Group, opposed a united front and stated that engaging in one would effectively dissolve the CPK. The Communist International changed its stance to oppose united fronts at this time. Singanhoe branches controlled by the communists voted to dissolve. Singanhoe held a national conference on 15 May 1931, the first time the Japanese allowed it to hold one, and the delegates voted to dissolve the organisation.

== Manchuria ==
Kim Ch'an, who avoided arrest in 1925, formed the Manchuria General Bureau in May 1926. The CPK instructed the Manchurian General Bureau to not join Singanhoe. Japanese police conducted a mass arrest during a secret meeting of communist leaders on 3 October 1927, and arrested another 200 people after discovering important documents at the meeting.

In January 1929, the Shanghai and Seoul factions formed the Korean Communist Party Re-establishment Preparation Association (KCPRPA) in Tunhwa, which decided to focus on activities in Manchuria rather than attempt to reform the party in Korea. Kim Ch'ǒl-su, who led a previous attempt to reform the party, was chair of the KCPRPA. This organisation sent agents to Korea, but all of them were arrested. The KCPRPA was based in Seoul until the arrest of Kim Ch'ǒl-su in May 1930, when it moved to Hamhung and selected Kim Il-su as chair.

The Communist International, seeing the KCPRPA's failure to reform the party, ordered its dissolution and gave the task of reforming the CPK to the Manchurian Provincial Committee of the Chinese Communist Party in 1930. Kim Il-su officially dissolved the KCPRPA on 20 March 1931. The Leftist Labor Union National Council Preparation Association (LLUNCPA), which was a continuation of the KCPRPA, was formed on 23 March 1931, with Kim Il-su as chair. Over 100 LLUNCPA members were arrested during an International Workers' Day demonstration in 1931.

The Japanese invasion of Manchuria in 1931 placed Manchurian communists under the control of Japanese authorities. By 1932, over 1,200 communists were killed and 1,500 imprisoned in Jiandao. The number of communists in Jiandao in 1933 was around 600 to 800, with the majority being Korean, and 517 of the 706 members of the Northeastern People's Revolutionary Army were Korean in 1935.

Kim Il Sung was first noticed by Japanese authorities in 1937. His status in Japanese reports rose from insignificant to being one of the most significant guerrilla in Manchuria. Kim Il Sung's actions during the Minsaengdan incident helped solidify his leadership. The CCP operating in Manchuria had become suspicious that any Korean in Manchuria could secretly be a member of the pro-Japanese Minsaengdan. A purge resulted: over 1,000 Koreans were expelled from the CCP, including Kim (who was arrested in late 1933 and exonerated in early 1934), and 500 were killed. Kim himself was forced to confess alleged membership multiple times despite never having been a member. Kim Il Sung's memoirs – and those of the guerrillas who fought alongside him – cite Kim's seizing and burning the suspect files of the Purge Committee as key to solidifying his leadership. After the destruction of the suspect files and the rehabilitation of suspects, those who had fled the purge rallied around him.

== Post-war period ==
The People's Republic of Korea was established on 6 September 1945, and included figures from the communist and nationalist groups, such as Lyuh Woon-hyung being vice president under Syngman Rhee. In the Central Committee, 39 of the 55 members were affiliated with the CPK. John R. Hodge, the military commander in the south, rejected the new government on 10 October, and placed the area under the administration of the United States military. Lyuh Woon-hyung left the CPK and formed the People's Party of Korea on 12 November 1945.

The Seoul District Committee of the Korean Communist Party was established by Yi Yong on 16-18 August 1945, and became known as the Changan group due to it placing a sign over the Changan Building. Pak Hon-yong rejected an offer to join the Changan group and formed his own preparatory group. The CPK was reestablished by Pak Hon-yong on 11 September. Meetings to unite the groups were held in October, and the Changan group dissolved itself and joined Pak Hon-yong's group on 23 November. The KCP was estimated to have around 3,000 members within the American occupation zone in September 1945, and grew to 20,000-30,000 by January 1946.

On 13 October 1945, the North Korea Bureau of the Communist Party of Korea was established. Though technically under the control of the Seoul-based party leadership, the North Korean Bureau had little contact with Seoul and worked closely with the Soviet Civilian Authority. The first chairman of the Bureau was Kim Yong-bom who had been sent to Korea by the Comintern in the 1930s to conduct underground activity. Kim Il Sung was a member of the Bureau at its founding and replaced Kim Yong-bom as chairman in December 1945. Official North Korean historians later disputed this, claiming that Kim Il Sung had become its chairman from the onset of the Bureau. Moreover, official North Korean sources claim that the meeting was held on 10 October. 10 October is regarded as the "Party Foundation Day" in North Korea, on which Kim Il Sung formed the first genuine Marxist–Leninist party in the country. Official North Korean historians seek to downplay the role of early communist leaders like Pak Hon-yong. Official North Korean sources claim that the name of the Bureau was changed to 'Organizational Committee of the Communist Party of North Korea' (often simply referred to as the 'Communist Party of North Korea').

The CPK attempted to have good relations with Syngman Rhee and was one of the 200 groups involved in his Central Conference for the Acceleration of Independence in 1945. However, relations deteriorated and at the second conference of the organization Pak Hon-yong wanted to tone down Syngman Rhee's resolution against the partition. The CPK withdrew from the organization on 5 November. The Moscow Conference planned to place Korea under a trusteeship. The CPK initially opposed the plan, but gave its support to the proposition on 3 January 1946, due to Soviet pressure.

The nationalists formed the Representative Democratic Council on 14 February 1946, and around 40 communist organisations, including the CPK, formed the Korean Democratic People's Front in response on 16 February.

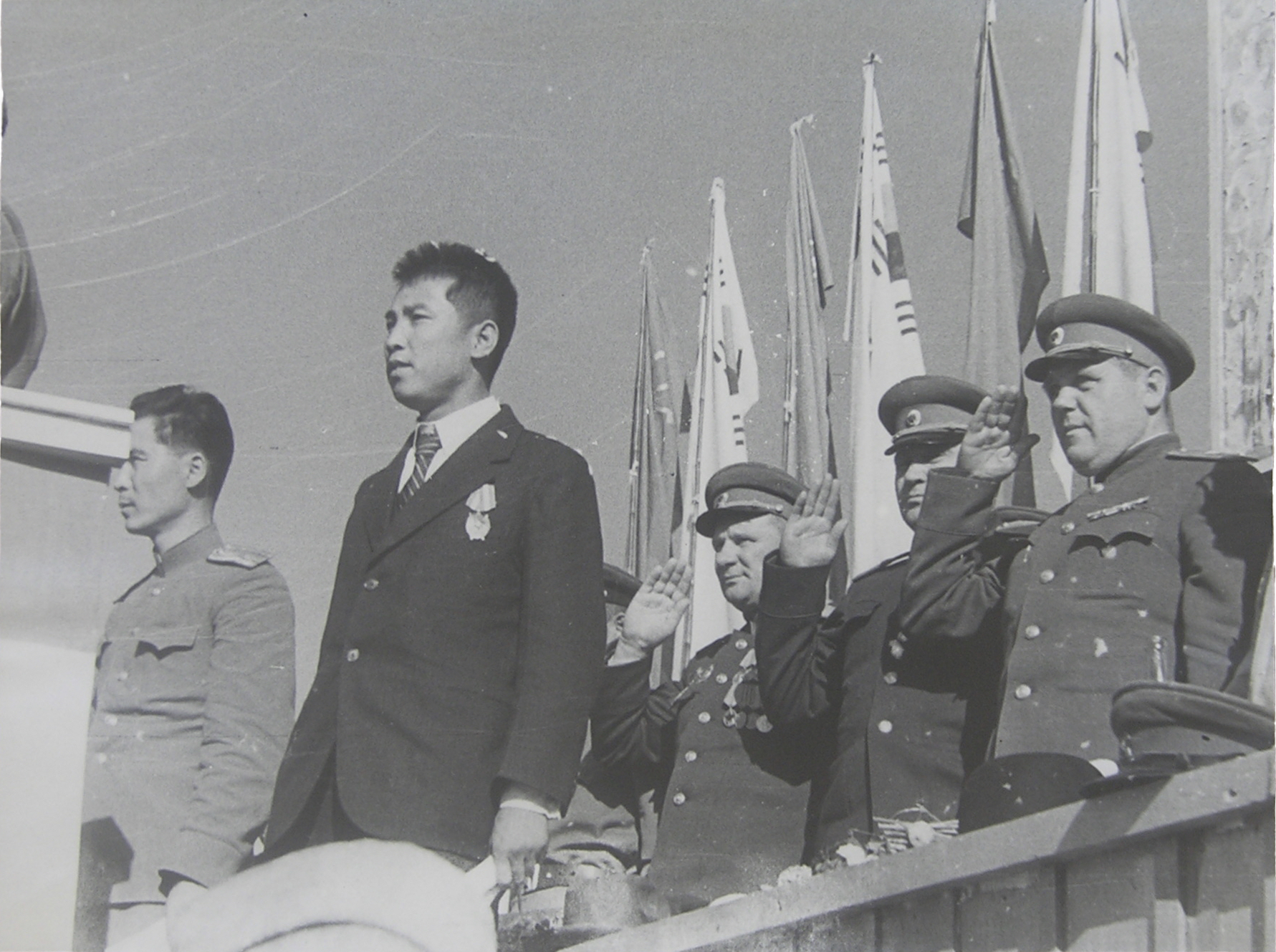
Kim Il Sung made his first public appearance in Pyongyang on 14 October 1945.

Kim Il Sung made his first public appearance in Pyongyang on 14 October 1945. Kim Il Sung transformed the North Korean Branch Bureau into the North Korean Communist Party in April 1946. The New People's Party of Korea offered to merge with this group on 23 July 1946, and the New People's Party's executive committee voted in favor of merging on 15 August. This merger formed the Workers' Party of North Korea in August. This new party was independent of the Soviets and excluded the leadership of the CPK.

Pak Hon-yong pushed for the creation of the Workers' Party of South Korea. The SKWP was announced on 3 September 1946, and its first congress was held on 22-23 November. On 29 September, around 250 people who opposed Pak Hon-yong met in Seoul to reform the party with Kim Ch'ǒl-su was as their leader, but the conference delegates were arrested by American authorities. In September, the CPK led a nationwide general strike. At its peak, more than 250,000 workers had joined the strike, which evolved into the Autumn Uprising of 1946. Pak Hon-yong fled to north of the 38th parallel in October after an arrest warrant was issued against him.

== See also ==
- Korean Communist Party
- Workers' Party of Korea
- Party Foundation Day

== Works cited ==
- Lankov, Andrei (2002). From Stalin to Kim Il Song: The Formation of North Korea, 1945–1960. C. Hurst & Co. Publishers. ISBN 978-1850655633.
- Armstrong, Charles (2013). The North Korean Revolution, 1945–1950. Cornell University Press. ISBN 9780801468803.
- Kim, Suzy (2016). Everyday Life in the North Korean Revolution, 1945–1950. Cornell University Press. ISBN 978-1-5017-0568-7.
- Scalapino, Robert; Lee, Chong-Sik (1972). Communism in Korea: Part 1: The Movement. University of California Press. ISBN 0520020804.
- Suh, Dae-sook (1967). The Korean Communist Movement: 1918-1948. Princeton University Press.
- Tertitskiy, Fyodor (2025). Accidental Tyrant: The Life of Kim Il-sung. Oxford University Press. ISBN 9780197800881.
