= Workers' Party of Korea =

Ruling party of North Korea

Workers' Party of Korea 조선로동당
- Abbreviation: WPK
- General Secretary: Kim Jong Un
- Presidium: Kim Jong Un; Pak Thae-song; Kim Jae-ryong; Ri Il-hwan; Jo Yong-won
- Founded: 24 June 1949
- Merger of: Workers' Party of North Korea; Workers' Party of South Korea
- Headquarters: Government Complex No. 1, Chung-guyok, Pyongyang
- Newspaper: Rodong Sinmun
- Youth wing: Socialist Patriotic Youth League
- Women's wing: Socialist Women's Union of Korea
- Children's wing: Korean Children's Union
- Armed wing: Korean People's Army
- Paramilitary wing: Worker-Peasant Red Guards
- Membership (2021 est.): ▲ ~6,500,000
- Ideology: Communism; Kimilsungism–Kimjongilism; Juche; Pyŏngjin; North Korean nationalism; Historical: Korean nationalism; Marxism–Leninism; Songun
- National affiliation: DFRK (1949–2024)
- International affiliation: IMCWP; For the Freedom of Nations!
- Colors: Red
- Anthem: "Long Live the Workers' Party of Korea"
- Supreme People's Assembly: 671 / 687

Party flag

Website
- www.rodong.rep.kp (Rodong Sinmun website)

Workers' Party of Korea

North Korean name
- Chosŏn'gŭl: 조선로동당
- Hancha: 朝鮮勞動黨
Transcriptions
- Revised Romanization: Joseon Rodongdang
- McCune–Reischauer: Chosŏn Rodongdang

South Korean name
- Hangul: 조선노동당
- Hanja: 朝鮮勞動黨
Transcriptions
- Revised Romanization: Joseon Nodongdang
- McCune–Reischauer: Chosŏn Nodongdang

The Workers' Party of Korea (WPK) (Note: Korean: 조선로동당; MR: Chosŏn Rodongdang; lit. ''Korea[n] Labor Party'') is the ruling party of North Korea. Founded in 1949 from a merger between the Workers' Party of North Korea and the Workers' Party of South Korea, the WPK is the oldest active party in Korea. It also controls the Korean People's Army, North Korea's armed forces. The WPK is the largest party represented in the Supreme People's Assembly and coexists with two other legal parties, the Chondoist Chongu Party and the Korean Social Democratic Party, that are completely subservient to the WPK and must accept the WPK's "leading role" as a condition of their existence. Kim Jong Un is the current party leader, serving as General Secretary of the WPK.

The North Korean Branch Bureau of the Communist Party of Korea (CPK) was founded in 1945. In 1946, it was transformed into the Communist Party of North Korea (CPNK), becoming independent from the CPK, and merged with the New People's Party of Korea in the same year to eventually form the Workers' Party of North Korea. Meanwhile, the CPK was succeeded by the Workers' Party of South Korea. In 1948, the WPNK founded North Korea. In 1949, WPNK merged with the WPSK to form the Workers' Party of Korea. Kim Il Sung was installed as the leader of the WPK and the leader of North Korea. In 1950, WPK leader Kim Il Sung launched the Korean War, aiming to unite Korea, but was deterred by American intervention. Kim Il Sung attempted to stay neutral during the Sino–Soviet split, while decreasing both Chinese and Soviet influence in the WPK. Kim Il Sung purged rival factions in the WPK following the August faction incident in 1956 and the Kapsan faction incident in 1967, while promoting his own cult of personality.

At the 6th Party Congress in 1980, Kim Il Sung announced Kim Jong Il, his son, as his successor. Kim Il Sung died in 1994, leading Kim Jong Il to succeed him. Under Kim Jong Il, who governed as chairman of the National Defence Commission, communism was steadily removed from party and state documents in favor of Songun, or military-first politics. The military, rather than the working class, was established as the base of political power, and party institutions weakened. Kim Jong Il died in 2011, and was succeeded by his son Kim Jong Un. Under his leadership, there has been a revival of the party institutions, as well as a decrease in the influence of the military. The 4th Party Conference, held in 2012, amended the party rules to state that Kimilsungism–Kimjongilism was "the only guiding idea of the party". In 2021, Kim Jong Un replaced Songun with "people-first politics" as the party's political method and reasserted the party's commitment to communism. In 2023, the WPK abandoned its goals of Korean reunification.

Officially, the WPK is a communist party guided by Kimilsungism–Kimjongilism, a synthesis of the ideas of Kim Il Sung and Kim Jong Il. The party is committed to Juche, an ideology attributed to Kim Il Sung which promotes national independence and development through the efforts of the popular masses. Although Juche was originally presented as the Korean interpretation of Marxism–Leninism, the party now presents it as a freestanding philosophy. The WPK recognizes the ruling Kim family as the ultimate source of its political thought. The WPK is organized according to the Monolithic Ideological System, conceived by Kim Yong-ju and Kim Jong Il. The highest body of the WPK is formally the party congress; however, in practice the real power is concentrated in the current supreme leader. After the 4th Congress (1961), party congresses were held irregularly roughly once per decade. After the 6th Congress (1980), no Party Congress was held until the 7th Congress (2016) during Kim Jong Un's tenure. The WPK is banned in South Korea under the National Security Act and is sanctioned by the United Nations, the European Union, Australia, and the United States.

== History ==
=== Founding and early years (1945–1953) ===
On 13 October 1945, the North Korean Bureau of the Communist Party of Korea (NKB–CPK) was established, with Kim Yong-bom as its first chairman. However, the NKB–CPK remained subordinate to the CPK Central Committee, which was headquartered in Seoul and headed by Pak Hon-yong. Two months later, at the 3rd Plenum of the NKB, Kim Yong-bom was replaced by Kim Il Sung, an event which was probably orchestrated by the Soviet Union. The North Korean Bureau became the Communist Party of North Korea in spring 1946, with Kim Il Sung being elected its chairman. On 22 July 1946, Soviet authorities in North Korea established the United Democratic National Front, a popular front led by the Communist Party of North Korea. The Communist Party of North Korea soon merged with the New People's Party of Korea, a party primarily composed of communists from China. A special commission of the two parties ratified the merger on 28 July 1946, and it became official the following day. One month later (28–30 August 1946), the party held its founding congress, establishing the Workers' Party of North Korea (WPNK). The congress elected the former leader of the New People's Party of Korea Kim Tu-bong as the first WPNK chairman, with Kim Il Sung its appointed deputy chairman. However, despite his formal downgrade in the party's hierarchy, Kim Il Sung remained its leader.

Party control increased throughout the country after the congress. From 27 to 30 March 1948, the WPNK convened its 2nd Congress. While Kim Tu-bong was still the party's formal head, Kim Il Sung presented the main report to the congress. In it he claimed that North Korea was "a base of democracy", in contrast to South Korea, which he believed to be dictatorial. On 28 April 1948 a special session of the Supreme People's Assembly approved the constitution proposed and written by WPNK cadres, which led to the official establishment of an independent North Korea. It did not call for the establishment of an independent North Korea, but for a unified Korea under a communist government; the capital of the Democratic People's Republic of Korea (DPRK) would be Seoul, not Pyongyang. Kim Il Sung was the appointed head of government of the new state, with Kim Tu-bong heading the legislative branch. A year later on 24 June 1949, the Workers' Party of Korea was created with the merger of the WPNK and the Workers' Party of South Korea.

Kim Il Sung was not the most ardent supporter of a military reunification of Korea; that role was played by the South Korean communists, headed by Pak Hon-yong. After several meetings between Kim Il Sung and Soviet leader Joseph Stalin, North Korea invaded South Korea on 25 June 1950, thus beginning the Korean War. With American intervention in the war the DPRK nearly collapsed, but it was saved by Chinese intervention in the conflict. The war had the effect of weakening Soviet influence over Kim Il Sung and the WPK. Around this time, the main fault lines in early WPK politics were created. Four factions formed: the domestic faction (WPK cadres who had remained in Korea during Japanese rule), the Soviet faction (Koreans from the Soviet Union), the Yan'an faction (Koreans from China) and the guerrilla faction (Kim Il Sung's personal faction). However, Kim Il Sung would be unable to further strengthen his position until the end of the war.

=== Kim Il Sung's consolidation of power (1953–1980) ===
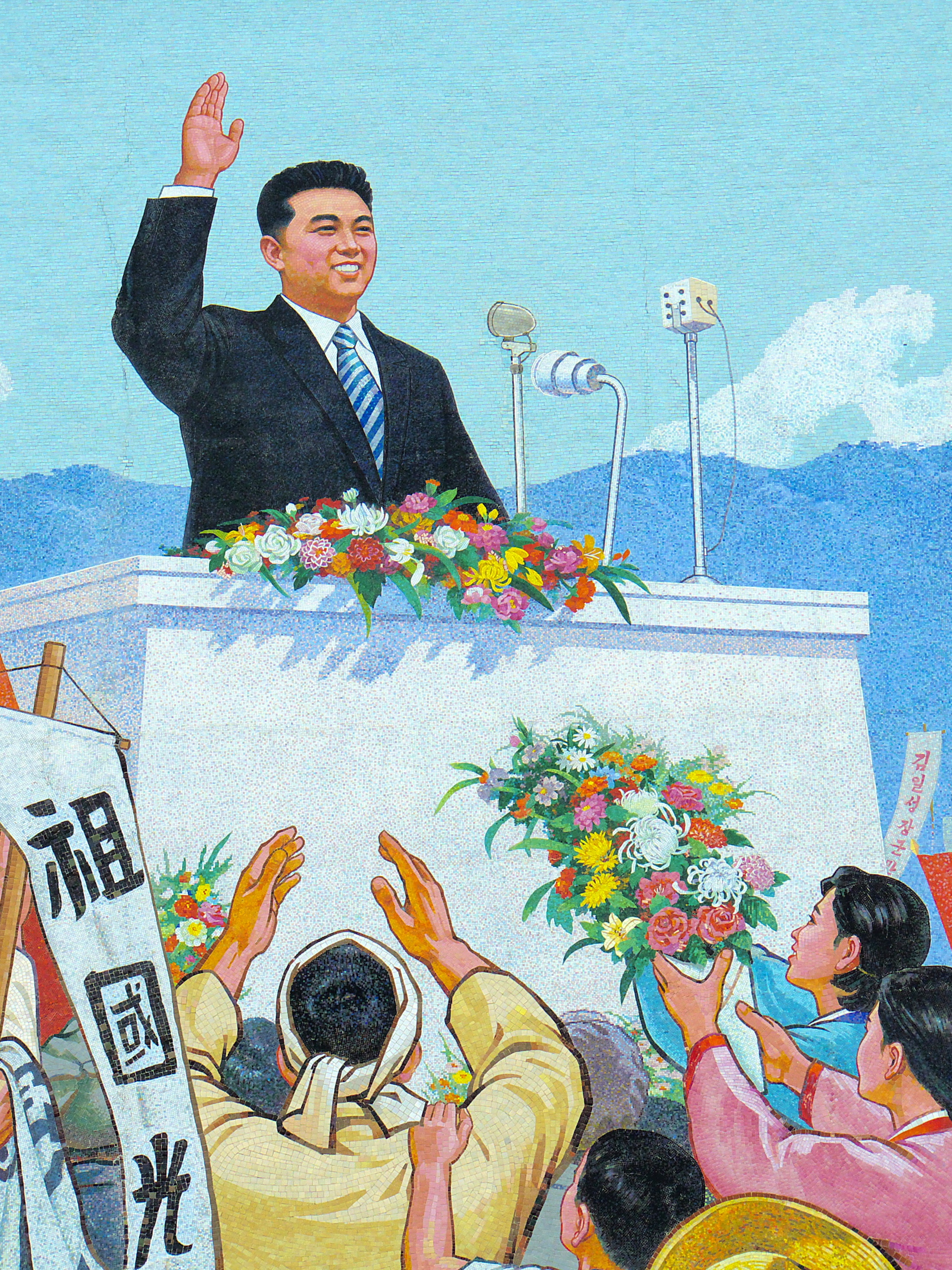
Propaganda mosaic depicting Kim Il Sung's first public speech given in Pyongyang in September 1945, after the liberation of Korea from Japanese occupation.

Relations worsened between the WPK and the Communist Party of the Soviet Union (CPSU) when Stalin's successor, Nikita Khrushchev, began pursuing a policy of de-Stalinization. During the Sino–Soviet split, an ideological conflict between the CPSU and the Chinese Communist Party (CCP), Kim Il Sung manoeuvred between the two socialist superpowers; by doing so, he weakened their influence on the WPK. By 1962 Kim Il Sung and the WPK favored the CCP over the CPSU in the ideological struggle, and "for a few years North Korea almost unconditionally supported the Chinese position on all important issues." The primary conflict between the WPK and the CPSU during this period was that Kim Il Sung did not support the denunciation of Stalinism, the creation of a collective leadership, and the theory of peaceful coexistence between the capitalist and socialist worlds. Kim Il Sung believed peaceful coexistence to be synonymous with capitulation and knew that de-Stalinization in North Korea would effectively end his unlimited power over the WPK. The result of the souring of relations between the CPSU and the WPK was that the Soviet Union discontinued aid to North Korea.

China was meanwhile unwilling to increase its aid, and several North Korean industries were consequently on the brink of disaster. Mao Zedong began the Cultural Revolution shortly thereafter, an event criticized by the WPK as "left-wing opportunism" and a manifestation of the "Trotskyist theory of a permanent revolution." Relations between the CPSU and the CCP stabilized during the 1960s, with the WPK making it clear it would remain neutral in the Sino–Soviet conflict, thus resulting in the 1966 launch of the Juche program aimed at national self-determination at all levels. This, in turn, strengthened Kim Il Sung's position in the WPK.

Beginning in the 1960s, Kim Il Sung's cult of personality reached new heights. It had been no greater than Stalin's or Mao's until 1972, when his birthday on 15 April became the country's main public holiday and statues of him began to be built nationwide. Kim became known as "Great Leader", the "Sun of the Nation", "The Iron All-Victorious General" and "Marshal of the All-Mighty Republic" in WPK and state publications; official propaganda stated that "burning loyalty to the leader" was one of the main characteristics of any Korean.

Kim Il Sung and his guerilla faction had purged the WPK of its opposing factions during the 1950s and the 1960s, to the dismay of both the CCP and the CPSU. The domestic faction was the first to go (in 1953–55), followed by the Yan'an faction in 1957–58 and the Soviet Koreans (along with anyone else deemed unfaithful to the WPK leadership) in the 1957–62 purge. According to historian Andrei Lankov, "Kim Il Sung had become not only supreme but also the omnipotent ruler of North Korea—no longer merely 'first amongst equals, as had been the case in the late 1940s". After purging his WPK opposition, Kim Il Sung consolidated his power base with nepotism and hereditary succession in the Kim family and the guerilla faction. Beginning in the late 1980s, "a high (and increasing) proportion of North Korean high officials have been sons of high officials."

Since the 1960s, Kim Il Sung had appointed family members to positions of power. By the early 1990s, a number of leading national offices were held by people in his family: Kang Song-san (Premier of the Administrative Council and member of the WPK Secretariat), Pak Song-chol (Vice President), Hwang Jang-yop and Kim Chung-rin (members of the WPK Secretariat), Kim Yong-sun (Head of the WPK International Department and member of the WPK Secretariat), Kang Hui-won (Secretary of the WPK Pyongyang Municipal Committee and Deputy Premier of the Administrative Council), Kim Tal-hyon (Minister of Foreign Trade), Kim Chan-ju (Minister of Agriculture and Deputy Chairman of the Administrative Council) and Yang Hyong-sop (President of the Academy of Social Sciences and chairman of the Supreme People's Assembly). These individuals were appointed solely because of their ties to the Kim family, and presumably retain their positions as long as the Kim family controls the WPK and the country. The reason for Kim's support of nepotism (his own and that of the guerrilla faction) can be explained by the fact that he did not want the party bureaucracy to threaten his—and his son's—rule as it did in other socialist states.

It was first generally believed by foreign observers that Kim Il Sung was planning for his brother, Kim Yong-ju, to succeed him. Kim Yong-ju's authority gradually increased, until he became co-chairman of the North-South Coordination Committee. From late 1972 to the 6th WPK Congress, Kim Yong-ju became an increasingly remote figure in the regime. At the 6th Congress, he lost his Politburo and Central Committee seats, and rumours that Kim Il Sung had begun grooming Kim Jong Il in 1966 were confirmed. From 1974 to the 6th Congress, Kim Jong Il (called the "Party centre" by North Korean media) was the second most powerful man in North Korea. His selection was criticized, with his father accused of creating a dynasty or turning North Korea into a feudal state.

=== Kim Jong Il's rule (1980–2011) ===
Although Kim Jong Il headed the WPK with no pretence of following the party rules, it was revitalized at the 3rd Conference at the end of his rule.

With Kim Jong Il's official appointment as heir apparent at the 6th Congress, power became more centralized in the Kim family. WPK officials began to speak openly about his succession, and beginning in 1981 he began to participate in (and lead) tours. In 1982, he was made a Hero of the Democratic People's Republic of Korea and wrote On the Juche Idea. While foreign observers believed that Kim Jong Il's appointment would increase participation by the younger generation, in On the Juche Idea he made it clear that his leadership would not mark the beginning of a new generation of leaders. The WPK could not address the crisis facing Kim Il Sung and Kim Jong Il's leadership at home and abroad, in part because of the gerontocracy at the highest level of the WPK and the state.

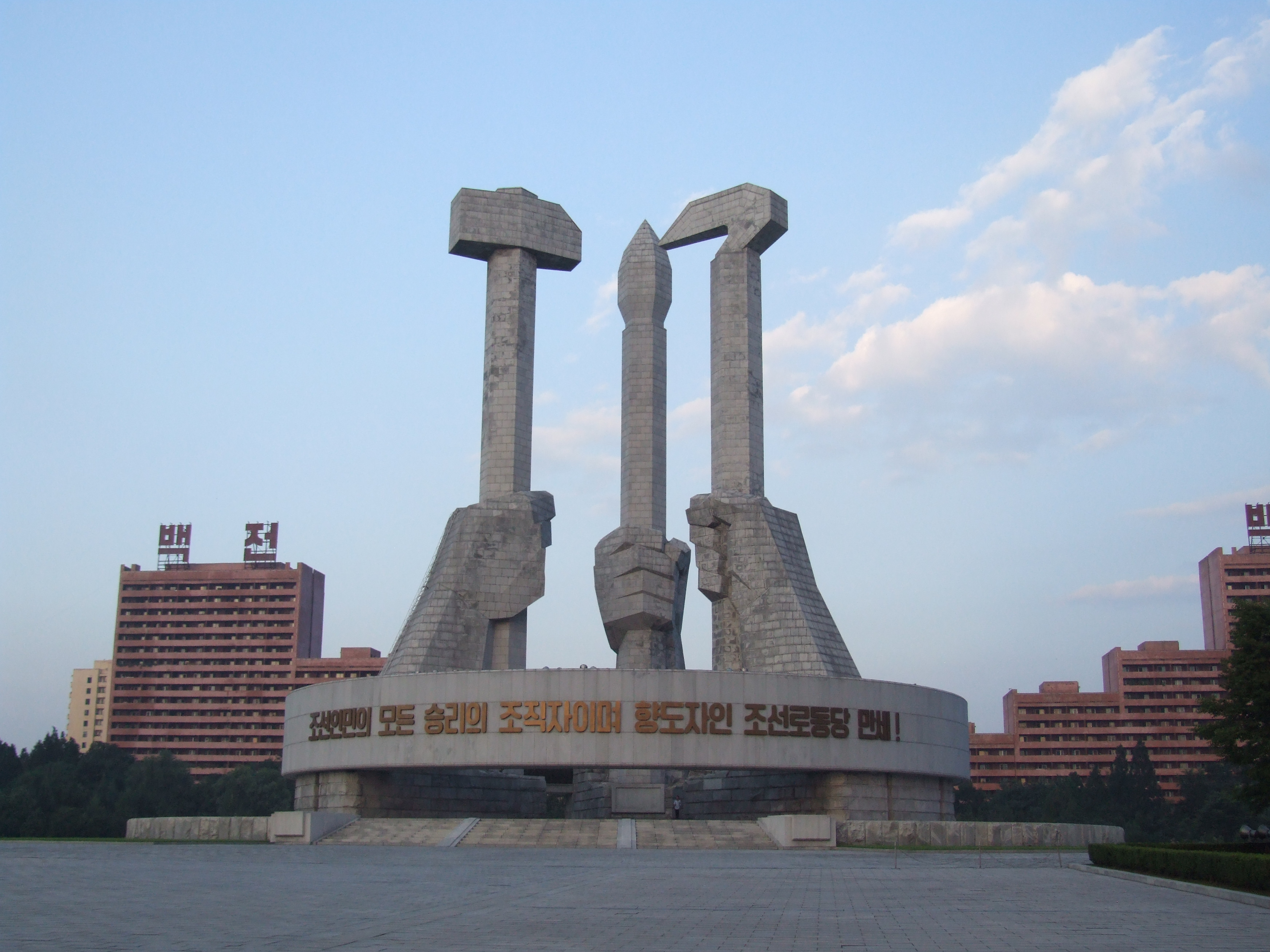
The Monument to Party Founding in Pyongyang, erected in 1995

With the death of O Jin-u on 25 February 1995, Kim Jong Il became the sole remaining living member of the Presidium (the highest body of the WPK when the Politburo and the Central Committee are not in session). While no member list of the WPK Central Military Commission (CMC, the highest party organ on military affairs) was published from 1993 to 2010, there were clear signs of movement in the military hierarchy during 1995. For the WPK's 50th anniversary, Kim Jong Il initiated a reshuffling of the CMC (and the military leadership in general) to appease the old guard and younger officials. He did not reshuffle the WPK Central Committee or the government, however, during the 1990s the changes to its membership were caused mostly by its members dying of natural causes.

Beginning in 1995, Kim Jong Il favoured the military over the WPK and the state. Problems began to mount as an economic crisis, coupled with a famine in which at least half a million people died, weakened his control of the country. Instead of recommending structural reforms, Kim began to criticize the WPK's lack of control over the economy, lambasting its local and provincial branches for their inability to implement central-level instructions. At a speech celebrating the 50th anniversary of Kim Il Sung University, he said: "The reason why people are loyal to the instructions of the Central Committee is not because of party organizations and workers, but because of my authority." Kim Jong Il said that his father had told him to avoid economics, claiming that it was better left to experts. After this speech, the WPK's responsibility to control the economy was given to the Administrative Council (the central government). By late 1996, Kim Jong Il concluded that neither the WPK nor the central government could run the country, and began shifting control to the military. A constitutional amendment in 1998 redirected supreme state power in North Korea to the leadership of the military, rather than the WPK.

On 8 July 1997, the three-year mourning period for Kim Il Sung ended. Later that year, on 8 October, Kim Jong Il was appointed to the newly established office of General Secretary of the Workers' Party of Korea. There was considerable discussion by foreign experts about why Kim Jong Il was appointed General Secretary of the Workers' Party of Korea, instead of succeeding his father as General Secretary of the Central Committee of the Workers' Party of Korea. In a clear breach of the WPK rules, Kim Jong Il was appointed WPK General Secretary in a joint announcement by the 6th Central Committee and the CMC rather than elected by a plenum of the Central Committee. Although it was believed that Kim Jong Il would call a congress shortly after his appointment (to elect a new WPK leadership), he did not. The WPK would not be revitalized organizationally until the 3rd Conference in 2010.

Until then, Kim Jong Il ruled as an autocrat; only in WPK institutions considered important were new members and leaders appointed to take the place of dying officials. The 10th Supreme People's Assembly convened on 5 September 1998, amended the North Korean constitution. The amended constitution made the National Defense Commission (NDC), previously responsible for supervising the military, the highest state organ. Although the new constitution gave the cabinet and the NDC more independence from WPK officials, it did not weaken the party. Kim Jong Il remained WPK General Secretary, controlling the Organization and Guidance Department (OGD) and other institutions. While the central WPK leadership composition was not renewed in a single stroke until 2010, the WPK retained its important role as a mass organization.

On 26 June 2010, the Politburo announced that it was summoning delegates for the 3rd Conference, with its official explanation of the need to "reflect the demands of the revolutionary development of the Party, which is facing critical changes in bringing about the strong and prosperous state and Juche development." The conference met on 28 September, revising the party rules and electing (and dismissing) members of the Central Committee, the Secretariat, the Politburo, the Presidium and other bodies. Kim Jong Un was confirmed as heir apparent; Vice Marshal Ri Yong-ho and General Kim Kyong-hui (Kim Jong Il's sister) were appointed to leading positions in the Korean People's Army and the WPK to help him consolidate power. The following year, on 17 December 2011, Kim Jong Il died.

=== Kim Jong Un's rule (2011–present) ===
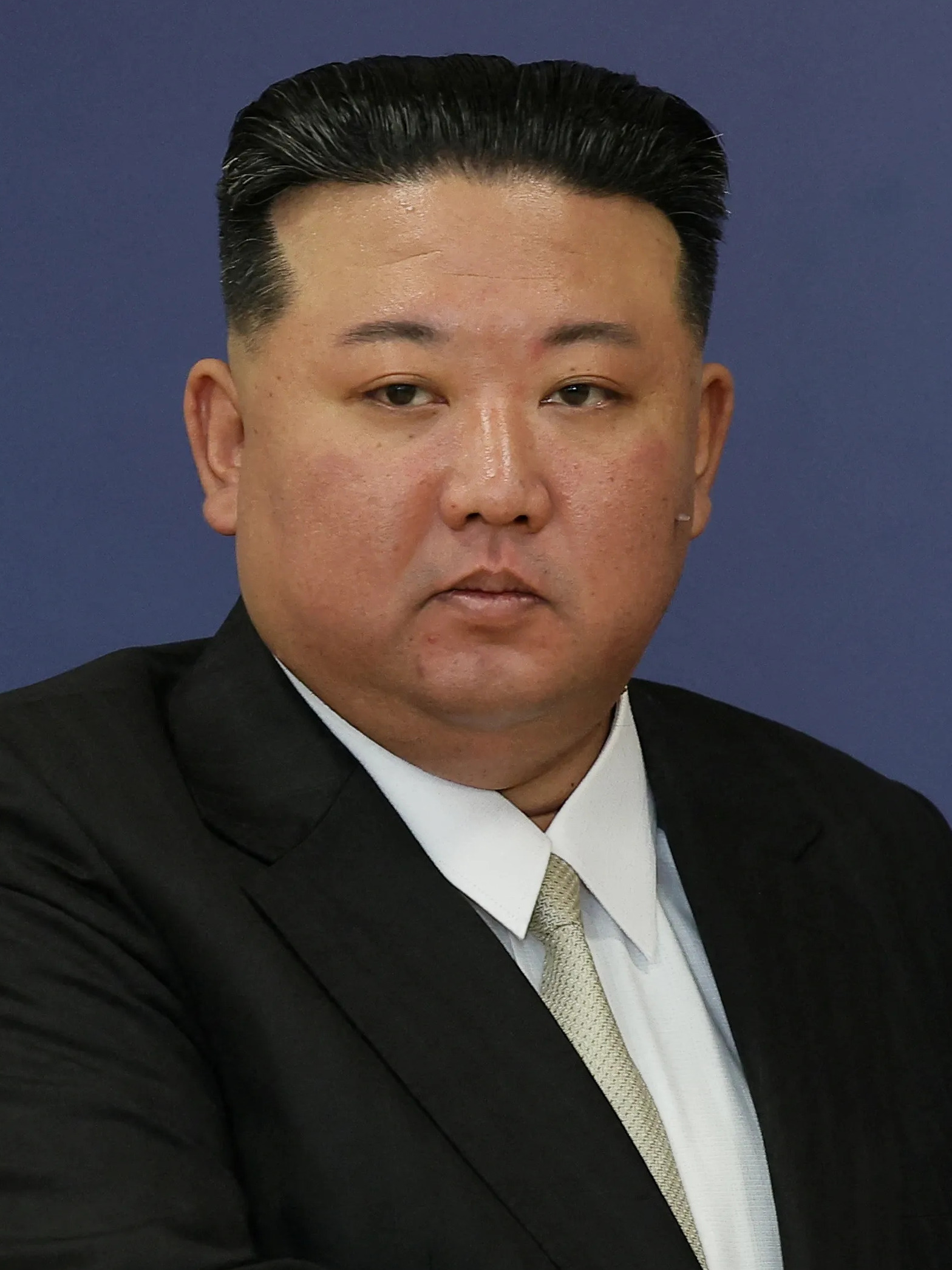
Kim Jong Un became the leader of the party following his father's death in 2011.

After Kim Jong Il's death, the North Korean elite consolidated Kim Jong Un's position; he was declared in charge of the country when the official report of his father's death was published on 19 December. On 26 December 2011, the official newspaper Rodong Sinmun hailed him as supreme leader of the party and the state. On 30 December a meeting of the Politburo officially appointed him Supreme Commander of the Korean People's Army, after he was nominated for the position by Kim Jong Il in October 2011 (the anniversary of Kim Jong Il's becoming general secretary). Despite the fact that he was not a Politburo member, Kim Jong Un was named to the unofficial position of the supreme leader of the Workers' Party of Korea.

After celebrations for Kim Jong Il's 70th birth anniversary, the Politburo announced on 18 February the 4th Party Conference (which was scheduled for mid-April 2012, near the 100th birth anniversary of Kim Il Sung) "to glorify the sacred revolutionary life and feats of Kim Jong Il for all ages and accomplish the Juche cause, the Songun revolutionary cause, rallied close around Kim Jong Un". Kim Jong Un was promoted to the rank of "Marshal of the Republic" in July 2012. At the 4th Party Conference on 11 April, Kim Jong Il was declared Eternal General Secretary and Kim Jong Un was elected to the newly created post of First Secretary of the Workers' Party of Korea and the Presidium. The conference amended the party rules to say Kimilsungism–Kimjongilism "the only guiding idea of the party". In December 2013, the party experienced its first open inner struggle in decades with the purge of Jang Song-thaek.

The party has seen somewhat of a revival under Kim Jong Un, with more frequent meetings. There have been two conferences, after a gap of 44 years, and a congress between 2010 and 2016. After staging a huge military parade in celebration of the party's 70th anniversary on 10 October 2015, the Politburo announced that its 7th Congress will be held on 6 May 2016 after a 36-year hiatus. The congress announced the first Five-Year Plan since the 1980s and gave Kim Jong Un the new title of chairman, which replaced the previous office of First Secretary.

In January 2021, the 8th WPK Congress was convened, where Kim Jong Un was given the title of general secretary, replacing the title of chairman. The congress also marked the consolidation of WPK control over the army and a decrease in the army's power, with the number of military delegates in both the congress and the Politburo decreasing. Kim's sister, Kim Yo Jong was appointed as a member of the Politburo. It was reported in June 2021 that the party set up the post of 'First Secretary', with speculation that Jo Yong-won or Kim Tok Hun, the Premier of North Korea would fill the position. Starting from 2021, Kim Jong Un has started reviving communism and communist terminology within the WPK, with the ideology being again written to the party rules. He also increasingly replaced Songun with "people-first politics" in the party rules. The 9th Congress was held in 2026, where Kim Jong Un delivered a report claiming the party had "successfully" met its goals set at the previous congress across all major sectors. Kim was re-elected as General Secretary during the congress.

== Ideology ==
The WPK maintains a leftist image. It normally sends a delegation to the International Meeting of Communist and Workers' Parties, where it has some support. Its 2011 resolution, "Let us jointly commemorate the Birth Centenary of the Great Leader comrade President Kim Il Sung as a Grand Political Festival of the World's Humankind", was signed by 30 of the 79 attending parties. The WPK also sees itself as part of the worldwide leftist and socialist movements; during the Cold War, the WPK and North Korea had a policy of "exporting revolution", aiding leftist guerrillas worldwide. Additionally, its party rules say its ultimate aim is to "realize a communist society in which the people's ideals are fully realized" and further state it upholds "the revolutionary principles of Marxism–Leninism". Brian Reynolds Myers, Jasper Becker, and Dae-Sook Suh argue that the WPK's ideology is xenophobic, racist, and nationalist.

=== Juche ===
==== Relationship to Marxism–Leninism ====
Although the term "Juche" was first used in Kim Il Sung's speech (given in 1955), "On Eliminating Dogmatism and Formalism and Establishing Juche in Ideological Work", Juche as a coherent ideology did not develop until the 1960s. Similar to Stalinism, it led to the development of an unofficial (later formalized) ideological system defending the central party leadership. Until about 1972, Juche was called a "creative application" of Marxism–Leninism and "the Marxism–Leninism of today", and Kim Il Sung was hailed as "the greatest Marxist–Leninist of our time". However, by 1976 Juche had become a separate ideology; Kim Jong Il called it "a unique ideology, the contents and structures which cannot simply be described as Marxist–Leninist."

At the 5th Congress, Juche was elevated to the same level as Marxism–Leninism. It gained prominence during the 1970s, and at the 6th Congress in 1980, it was recognized as the WPK's sole ideology. During the following decade, Juche transformed from practical to pure ideology. On the Juche Idea, the primary text on Juche, was published in Kim Jong Il's name in 1982. Juche is, according to this study, inexorably linked with Kim Il Sung and "represents the guiding idea of the Korean Revolution ... we are confronted with the honourable task of modelling the whole society on the Juche idea". In the work, Kim Jong Il says that Juche is not simply a creative application of Marxism–Leninism but "a new era in the development of human history". The WPK's break with basic Marxist–Leninist premises is spelt out clearly in the article, "Let Us March Under the Banner of Marxism–Leninism and the Juche Idea".

Despite Juche's conception as a creative application of Marxism and Leninism, some scholars argue it has little direct connection to them. Policies may be explained without a Marxist or Leninist rationale, making the identification of specific influences from these ideologies difficult. Some analysts say it is easier to connect Juche with nationalism, but not a unique form of nationalism. Although the WPK claims to be socialist-patriotic, some analysts argue that its socialist patriotism is more similar to bourgeois nationalism; the chief difference is that socialist patriotism is nationalism within a socialist state. Juche developed as a reaction to foreign occupation, involvement and influence (primarily by the Chinese and Soviets) in North Korean affairs, and may be described "as a normal and healthy reaction of the Korean people to the deprivation they suffered under foreign domination." However, there is nothing uniquely Marxist or Leninist in this reaction; the primary reason for its description as "communist" is that it occurred in a self-proclaimed socialist state. The WPK (and the North Korean leadership in general) have not explained in detail how their policies are Marxist, Leninist or communist; Juche is defined as "Korean", and the others as "foreign".

==== Basic tenets ====
You requested me to give a detailed explanation of the Juche idea. But there is no end to it. All the policies and lines of our party emanate from the Juche idea and they embody this idea.

— Kim Il Sung, when asked by a Japanese interviewer to define Juche

Juche's primary objective for North Korea is political, economic and military independence. Kim Il Sung, in his "Let Us Defend the Revolutionary Spirit of Independence, Self-reliance, and Self-defense More Thoroughly in All Fields of State Activities" speech to the Supreme People's Assembly in 1967, summarized Juche:

The government of the republic will implement with all consistency the line of independence, self-sustenance, and self-defence to consolidate the political independence of the country (chaju), build up more solidly the foundations of an independent national economy capable of insuring the complete unification, independence, and prosperity of our nation (charip) and increasing the country's defence capabilities, to safeguard the security of the fatherland reliably by our own force (chawi), by splendidly embodying our Party's idea of Juche in all fields."

The principle of political independence known as chaju is one of Juche's central tenets. Juche stresses equality and mutual respect among nations, asserting that every state has the right to self-determination. In practice, the beliefs in self-determination and equal sovereignty have turned North Korea into a perceived "hermit kingdom". As interpreted by the WPK, yielding to foreign pressure or intervention would violate chaju and threaten the country's ability to defend its sovereignty. This may explain why Kim Jong Il believed that the Korean revolution would fail if North Korea became dependent on a foreign entity.

Regarding China and the Soviet Union, Kim Il Sung advocated for cooperation and mutual support, acknowledging that it was essential for North Korea to learn from the experiences of other countries. Despite this, he abhorred the idea that North Korea should depend on the two nations and did not want to follow their example dogmatically. Kim Il Sung said that the WPK needed to "resolutely repudiate the tendency to swallow things of others undigested or imitate them mechanically", attributing the success of North Korea to the WPK's independence in implementing policies. To ensure North Korean independence, official pronouncements stressed the need for the people to unite under the WPK and the Great Leader.

Economic independence (charip) is seen as the material basis of chaju. One of Kim Il Sung's greatest fears was North Korea's dependence on foreign aid; he believed it would threaten the country's ability to develop socialism, which could only be achieved by a state with a strong, independent economy. Charip emphasizes an independent national economy based on heavy industry; this sector, in theory, would then drive the rest of the economy. Kim Jong Il said:

Building an independent national economy means building an economy which is free from dependence on others and which stands on its own feet, an economy which serves one's own people and develops on the strength of the resources of one's own country and by the efforts of one's people.

Kim Il Sung considered military independence (chawi) crucial. Acknowledging that North Korea might need military support in a war against imperialist enemies, he emphasized a domestic response and summed up the party's (and state's) attitude towards military confrontation: "We do not want war, nor are we afraid of it, nor do we beg peace from the imperialists."

According to Juche, because of his consciousness, man has ultimate control over himself and the ability to change the world. This differs from classical Marxism, which believes that humans depend on their relationship to the means of production more than on themselves. The Juche view of a revolution led by a Great Leader, rather than a group of knowledgeable revolutionaries, is a break from Lenin's concept of a vanguard party.

=== Nationalism ===
Karl Marx and Friedrich Engels did not clarify the difference between the state and law, focusing on class divisions within nations. They argued that nation and law (as it existed then) would be overthrown and replaced by proletarian rule. This was the mainstream view of Soviet theoreticians during the 1920s; however, with Stalin at the helm in 1929, it was under attack. He criticized Nikolai Bukharin's position that the proletariat was hostile to the inclinations of the state, arguing that since the state (the Soviet Union) was in transition from capitalism to socialism the relationship between the state and the proletariat was harmonious. By 1936, Stalin argued that the state would still exist if the Soviet Union reached the communist mode of production but the socialist world was encircled by capitalist forces. Kim Il Sung took this position to its logical conclusion, arguing that the state would exist after North Korea reached the communist mode of production until a future world revolution. As long as capitalism survived, even if the socialist world predominated, North Korea could still be threatened by the restoration of capitalism.

The revival of the term "state" in the Soviet Union under Stalin led to the revival of the term "nation" in North Korea under Kim Il Sung. Despite official assertions that the Soviet Union was based on "class" rather than "state", the latter was revived during the 1930s. In 1955, Kim Il Sung expressed a similar view in his speech, "On Eliminating Dogmatism and Formalism and Establishing Juche in Ideological Work":

What we are doing now is not a revolution in some foreign country but our Korean revolution. Therefore, every ideological action must benefit the Korean revolution. To fulfil the Korean revolution, one should be perfectly cognizant of the history of our national struggle, of Korea's geography, and our customs.

From then on, he and the WPK stressed the roles of "revolutionary tradition" and Korea's cultural tradition in its revolution. At party meetings, members and cadres learned about North Korea's national prestige and its coming rejuvenation. Traditional customs were revived, to showcase Korean-ness. By 1965, Kim Il Sung stated that if communists continued opposing individuality and sovereignty, the movement would be threatened by dogmatism and revisionism. He criticized those communists who, he believed, subscribed to "national nihilism by praising all things foreign and vilifying all things national" and tried to impose foreign models on their own country. By the 1960s, Juche was a full-fledged ideology calling for a distinct path for North Korean socialist construction and non-interference in its affairs; however, a decade later it was defined as a system whose "fundamental principle was the realization of sovereignty".

Although WPK theoreticians were initially hostile towards the terms "nation" and "nationalism" because of the influence of the Stalinist definition of "state", by the mid-1960s their definition that a nation was a "a stable, historically formed community of people based on common language, territory, economic life, and culture" was revised and the characteristic of a "shared bloodline" was added to the definition. During the 1980s a common economic life was removed from the definition, with shared bloodline receiving increased emphasis. The WPK revised the meaning of nationalism in response to the democratic transition in South Korea and the dissolution of the Soviet Union. Previously defined in Stalinist terms as a bourgeois weapon to exploit the workers, nationalism changed from a reactionary to a progressive idea. Kim Il Sung differentiated "nationalism" from what he called "genuine nationalism"; while genuine nationalism was a progressive idea, nationalism remained reactionary:

True nationalism (genuine nationalism) is similar to patriotism. Only a genuine patriot can become a devoted and true internationalist. In this sense, when I say communist, at the same time, I mean nationalist and internationalist.

The WPK historically promoted Korean nationalism and eventual reunification of the two Koreas. In 2023, Kim Jong Un officially declared that North Korea was abandoning reunification as a goal and declared the relationship between North as South Korea as one of "two hostile states". He stated "the party's comprehensive conclusion after reviewing inter-Korean relations is that reunification can never be achieved with those Republic of Korea riffraffs that defined the 'unification by absorption' and 'unification under liberal democracy' as their state policy", which he said is in "sharp contradiction with what our line of national reunification was: one nation, one state with two systems".

=== Allegations of xenophobia and racism ===
Whatever the name and however elaborate his claim, Kim's Juche idea is nothing more than xenophobic nationalism that has little relevance to communism.

— Dae-Sook Suh, author of Kim Il Sung: The North Korean Leader

During the 1960s the WPK began forcing ethnic Koreans to divorce their European spouses (who were primarily from the Eastern Bloc), with a high-ranking WPK official calling the marriages "a crime against the Korean race" and Eastern Bloc embassies in the country beginning to accuse the regime of fascism. In May 1963, a Soviet diplomat described Kim Il Sung's political circle as a "political Gestapo". Similar remarks were made by other Eastern Bloc officials in North Korea, with the East German ambassador calling the policy "Goebbelsian". Although this was said during a low point in relations between North Korea and the Eastern Bloc, it illustrated a perception of racism in Kim Il Sung's policies. North Korea's position on mixed marriages was inconsistent, however; it took a more permissive attitude towards Japanese spouses of Koreans repatriated from Japan as well as Chinese people in North Korea.

In his book The Cleanest Race (2010), Brian Reynolds Myers dismisses the idea that Juche is North Korea's leading ideology. He views its public exaltation as being designed to deceive foreigners; it exists to be praised rather than followed. Myers writes that Juche is a sham ideology, developed to extol Kim Il Sung as a political thinker comparable to Mao Zedong. According to Myers, North Korean military-first policy, racism and xenophobia (exemplified by race-based incidents such as the attempted lynching of black Cuban diplomats and forced abortions for North Korean women who got pregnant with Chinese men) indicate a base in far-right politics (inherited from Imperial Japan during its colonial occupation of Korea) rather than the far-left.

According to North Korea analyst Fyodor Tertitskiy, North Korean propaganda has "never asserted that Koreans are biologically superior" and that in fact, "such a statement was always directly condemned by Kim Jong Il". Instead, "the greatness of the Korean people lies solely in their leader. Koreans are great because they are led by Kim Il Sung, not for any other reason". He adds that while those in academia often try to create a logical worldview, having not received proper education, someone like Kim Il Sung's worldview would be "full of contradictions and logical holes", and that "Trying to explain his pattern of thinking and ruling the country with a simple theory – “the DPRK is a racist state,” “the DPRK is a traditional monarchy,” “the DPRK is a carbon copy of the USSR” – would be a distortion of the facts", especially since researchers who come to such conclusions would start to dismiss facts contradicting that conclusion. Tertitskiy also notes that North Korea gives very little weight to racial and nationalist element in its propaganda compared to the cult of personality around its leaders.

=== Kimilsungism–Kimjongilism ===
At its fourth party conference in April 2012, the Workers' Party of Korea declared itself "the party of Kim Il Sung and Kim Jong Il" and Kimilsungism–Kimjongilism as "the only guiding idea of the party".

Kimilsungism (김일성주의) and the Ten Principles for the Establishment of a Monolithic Ideological System were formally introduced by Kim Jong Il in 1974. Kim Jong Il reportedly did so to strengthen his position within the WPK, taking advantage of his father's political supremacy. Kimilsungism refers to the ideas of Kim Il Sung, while the Ten Principles serve as a guide for North Korean political and social life. Kim Jong Il argued that his father's ideas had evolved and they therefore deserved their own distinct name. North Korean state media had previously described Kim Il Sung's ideas as "contemporary Marxism–Leninism"; by calling them "Kimilsungism", Kim Jong Il sought to elevate the ideas of his father to the same level of prestige as Stalinism and Maoism. Not long after the introduction of "Kimilsungism" into the North Korean lexicon, Kim Jong Il began calling for a "Kimilsungist transformation" of North Korean society.

Political analyst Lim Jae-cheon argues that there is no discernible difference between Kimilsungism and Juche, and that the two terms are interchangeable. However, in his 1976 speech "On Correctly Understanding the Originality of Kimilsungism", Kim Jong Il said that Kimilsungism comprises the "Juche idea and a far-reaching revolutionary theory and leadership method evolved from this idea". He further added, "Kimilsungism is an original idea that cannot be explained within the frameworks of Marxism–Leninism. The Juche idea, which constitutes the quintessence of Kimilsungism, is an idea newly discovered in the history of mankind". He also stated that Marxism–Leninism had become obsolete and needed to be replaced by Kimilsungism:

The revolutionary theory of Kimilsungism is a revolutionary theory which has provided solutions to problems arising in the revolutionary practice in a new age different from the era that gave rise to Marxism–Leninism. On the basis of Juche idea, the leader gave a profound explanation of the theories, strategies and tactics of national liberation, class emancipation and human liberations in our era. Thus, it can be said that the revolutionary theory of Kimilsungism is a perfect revolutionary theory of Communism in the era of Juche.

According to analyst Shin Gi-wook, the ideas of Juche and Kimilsungism are in essence the "expressions of North Korean particularism over supposedly more universalistic Marxism–Leninism". The new terminology signalled a move from socialism to nationalism. This was evident in a speech presented by Kim Jong Il in 1982, during celebrations of his father's 70th birthday, in which he stated that love for the nation came before love for socialism. This particularism gave birth to concepts such as "A Theory of the Korean Nation as Number One" (조선민족제일주의) and "Socialism of Our Style" (우리식사회주의).

Following the death of Kim Jong Il in December 2011, Kimilsungism became Kimilsungism–Kimjongilism (김일성-김정일주의) at the 4th Conference of the Workers' Party of Korea in April 2012. Party members at the conference stated that the WPK was "the party of Kim Il Sung and Kim Jong Il" and declared Kimilsungism–Kimjongilism "the only guiding idea of the party". Afterwards, the Korean Central News Agency (KCNA) stated that "the Korean people have long called the revolutionary policies ideas of the President [Kim Il Sung] and Kim Jong Il as Kimilsungism–Kimjongilism and recognized it as the guiding of the nation". Kim Jong Un, the son of Kim Jong Il who succeeded him as leader of the WPK, said:

Kimilsungism–Kimjongilism is an integral system of the idea, theory and method of Juche and a great revolutionary ideology representative of the Juche era. Guided by Kimilsungism–Kimjongilism, we should conduct Party building and Party activities, so as to sustain the revolutionary character of our Party and advance the revolution and construction in line with the ideas and intentions of the President [Kim Il Sung] and the General [Kim Jong Il].

Naenara, the official web portal of the North Korean government, declares: "The Democratic People's Republic of Korea is an independent socialist state guided by the great Kimilsungism–Kimjongilism in its activities."

All references to Kimilsungism–Kimjongilism were officially removed from the Rules of the Workers' Party of Korea as amended at the 9th Congress of the Workers' Party of Korea in 2026.

== Governance ==
=== Great Leader ===
North Korea considers humanity the driving force of history. "Popular masses are placed in the centre of everything, and the leader in the centre of the masses". Traditional Marxism considers class struggle the driving force of historical progress. However, Marxism also sees class struggle as eventually coming to an end, when class distinctions begin to disappear in a communist society. From this point on, humanity can begin to "more and more consciously, make his own history" as human society ceases to be driven by social forces such as class struggle, but instead becomes "the result of his own free actions."

Juche is an anthropocentric ideology in which "man is the master of everything and decides everything". Similar to Marxist–Leninist thought, Juche believes that history is law-governed but only man drives progress: "the popular masses are the drivers of history". From the perspective of Juche, the struggle for humanity as a whole to make their own history is restrained by the ruling classes in class society. Additionally, only the working class can overcome these restraints and achieve a society where humanity can independently and creatively make their own history. Juche is in line with historical materialism, viewing mankind's ability to drive their own history as the culmination of a long-term historical process, whose foundations were laid by capitalism's ushering in of the working class, and thus Juche is unique to the socialist era. However, for the masses to succeed, they need a Great Leader. Marxism–Leninism argues that the people will lead, on the basis of their relationship to production. In North Korea, a singular Great Leader is considered essential, and this helped Kim Il Sung establish a one-person autocracy.

This theory makes the Great Leader an absolute, supreme leader. The working class thinks not for itself, but through the Great Leader; he is the mastermind of the working class and its only legitimate representative. Class struggle can only be realized through the Great Leader; difficult tasks in general (and revolutionary changes in particular) can only be introduced through—and by—him. Thus, in historical development the Great Leader is the leading force of the working class; he is a flawless, incorruptible human being who never makes mistakes, is always benevolent and rules for the benefit of the masses (working class). For the Great Leader system to function, a unitary ideology must be in place; in North Korea, this is known as the Monolithic Ideological System.

==== Kim family ====
The Kim family began with Kim Il Sung, the first leader of the WPK and North Korea. The official ideology is that the North Korean system functions "well" because it was established by Kim Il Sung, whose successors follow his bloodline. Every child is educated in "the revolutionary history of the Great Leader" and "the revolutionary history of the Dear Leader" (Kim Jong Il). Kim Il Sung's first choice as successor was Kim Yong-ju, his brother, but he later decided to appoint his son Kim Jong Il instead; this decision was formalized at the 6th Congress. Kim Jong Il appointed his youngest son, Kim Jong Un, as his successor at the 3rd WPK Conference in 2010, and his son succeeded him in early 2011. Because of the familial succession and the appointment of family members to high office, the Kim family has been called a dynasty and a royal family. Dae-Sook Suh, the author of Kim Il Sung: The North Korean Leader, notes that "What he [Kim Il Sung] has built in the North, however, resembles more a political system to accommodate his personal rule than a communist or socialist state in Korea. It is not the political system he built that will survive him; it is his son [Kim Jong Il], whom he has designated heir, who will succeed his reign." The ruling Kim family has been described as the head of a de facto absolute monarchy or "hereditary dictatorship".

=== Monolithic Ideological System ===
The Ten Principles for the Establishment of a Monolithic Ideological System are a set of ten principles and 65 clauses which establish standards for governance and guide the behaviours of the people of North Korea. The Ten Principles have come to supersede the national constitution or edicts by the Workers' Party, and in practice serve as the supreme law of the country.

=== Songbun ===
Tomatoes, which are completely red to the core, are considered worthy Communists; apples, which are red only on the surface, are considered to need ideological improvement; and grapes are completely hopeless.

— The three main classifications in North Korean society (core, wavering, and hostile), are metaphorically described as tomatoes, apples, and grapes, respectively.

Songbun is the name given to the caste system established on 30 May 1957 by the WPK Politburo when it adopted the resolution, "On the Transformation of the Struggle with Counter-Revolutionary Elements into an All-People All-Party Movement" (also known as the 30 May Resolution). This led to a purge in North Korean society in which every individual was checked for his or her allegiance to the party and its leader. The purge began in earnest in 1959, when the WPK established a new supervisory body headed by Kim Il Sung's brother, Kim Yong-ju.

The people of North Korea were divided into three "forces" (hostile, neutral or friendly), and the force in which a person was classified was hereditary. Hostile forces cannot live near Pyongyang (the country's capital) or other major cities, or near North Korea's border with other countries. Songbun affects access to educational and employment opportunities and, particularly, eligibility to join the WPK. However, its importance has diminished with the fall of the communist regimes in Eastern Europe and the collapse of the North Korean economy (and the Public Distribution System) during the 1990s.

The North Korean government, on the contrary, proclaims that all citizens are equal and denies any discrimination based on family background.

== Organization ==
=== Central organization ===
The Congress is the party's highest body and convenes on an irregular basis. According to the party rules, the Central Committee can convene a congress if it gives the rest of the party at least a six-month notice. The party rules give the Congress seven responsibilities:

1. Electing the Central Committee
2. Electing the Central Auditing Commission
3. Electing the General Secretary
4. Examining the report of the outgoing Central Committee
5. Examining the report of the outgoing Central Auditing Commission
6. Discussing and enacting party policies
7. Revising the party rules and making amendments to these

In between WPK national meetings, the Central Committee is the highest decision-making institution. The Central Auditing Commission is responsible for supervising the party's finances and works separately from the Central Committee. The Central Committee elects the composition of several bodies to carry out its work. The 1st Plenary Session of a newly elected central committee elects the Central Military Commission (CMC), the Secretariat, the Politburo, the Presidium, and the Central Auditing Commission. The Politburo exercises the functions and powers of the Central Committee when a plenum is not in session. The Presidium is the party's highest decision-making organ when the Politburo, the Central Committee, the Conference of Representatives and the Congress are not in session. It was established at the 6th National Congress in 1980.

The CMC is the highest decision-making institution on military affairs within the party and controls the operations of the Korean People's Army. The WPK General Secretary is by right Chairman of the CMC. Meanwhile, the Secretariat is the top implementation body and is headed by the WPK General Secretary and consists of several secretaries who normally head Central Committee departments, commissions, publications, and other organizations under it. The Central Auditing Commission resolves disciplinary issues involving party members. Investigative subjects range from graft to anti-party and counter-revolutionary activities, generally encompassing all party rules violations.

A first plenum of the Central Committee also elects the heads of departments, bureaus, and other institutions to pursue its work. The WPK currently has more than 15 Central Committee departments. Through these departments it controls several mass organisations and newspapers, such as Rodong Sinmun for instance. The Korean People's Army (KPA) is, according to the WPK rules, the "revolutionary armed power of the Workers' Party of Korea which inherited revolutionary traditions." The leading organ within the KPA is the General Political Bureau (GPB), which according to the WPK rules is defined "as an executive organ of the KPA Party Committee and is therefore entitled to the same authority as that of the Central Committee in conducting its activities." The GPB controls the party apparatus and every political officer within the KPA.

=== Lower-level organization ===
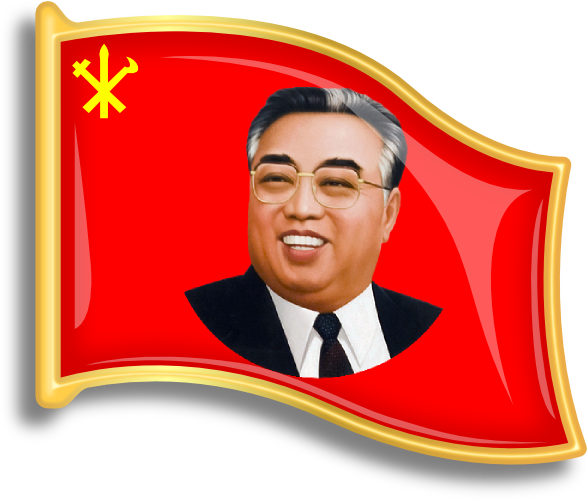
Kim Il Sung badge with the WPK emblem

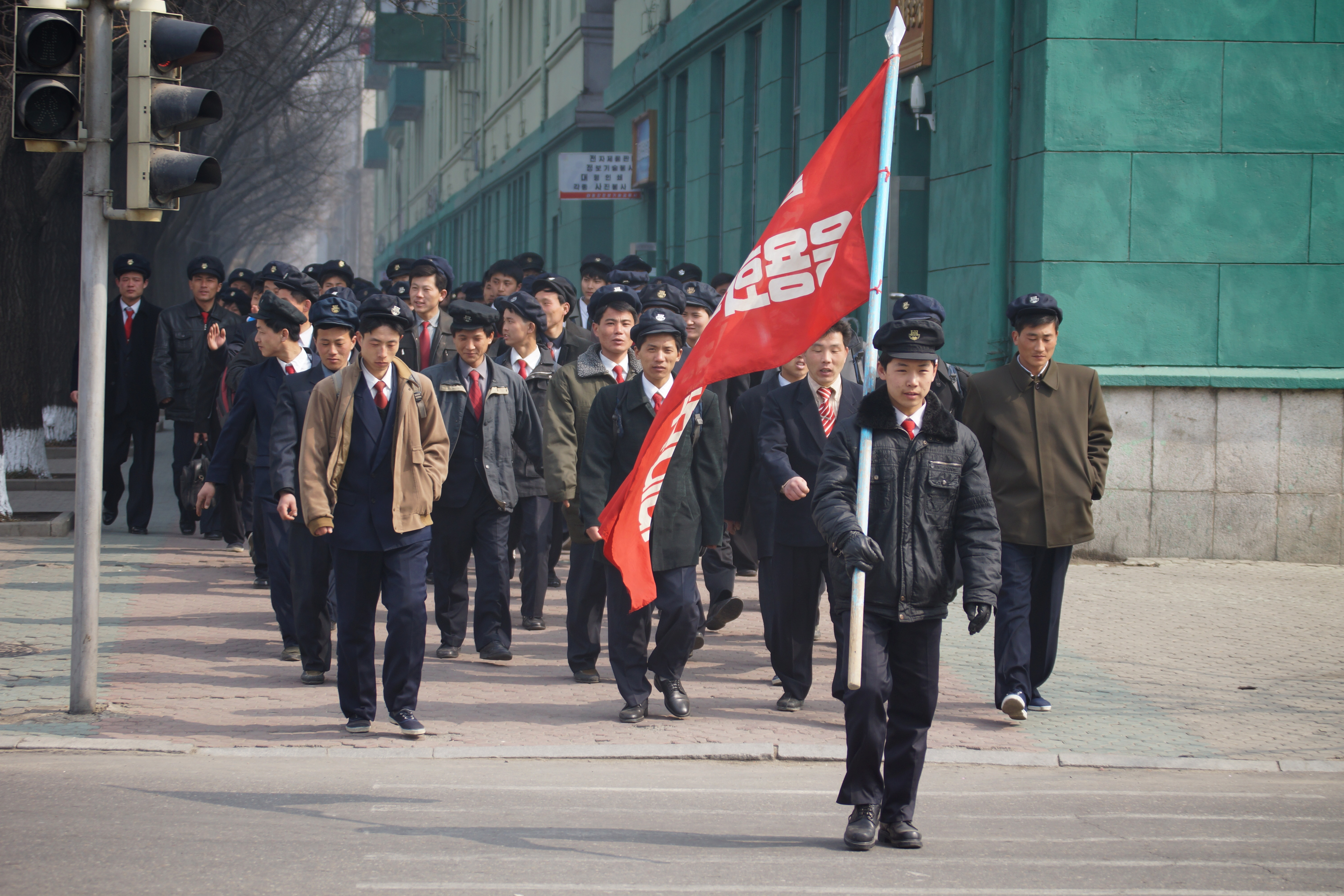
WPK cadres in Pyongyang on their way to celebrations of the 100th anniversary of Kim Il Sung's birth

The WPK has local organizations for the three levels of local North Korean government: (1) provinces and province-level municipalities, (2) special city, ordinary cities and urban districts, and (3) rural counties and villages. North Korea has nine provinces, each with a provincial party committee; their composition is decided by the WPK.

The WPK has two types of membership: regular and probationary. Membership is open to those 20 years of age and older and is granted after the submission of an application (endorsed by two parties' members with at least two years in good standing) to a cell. The application is acted on by the cell's plenary session, and an affirmative decision is subject to ratification by a county-level party committee. After an application is approved a mandatory one-year probationary period may be waived under unspecified "special circumstances", allowing the candidate to become a full member. Recruitment is under the direction of the Organization and Guidance Department and its local branches. The general secretary has the authority to directly admit citizens who have "rendered outstanding service to the Party and the revolution, the country and the people, or who are politically and ideologically prepared" as members or candidate members.

The WPK claimed a membership of more than three million in 1988, a significant increase from the two million members announced in 1976; the increase may have resulted from the Three Revolutions Team Movement mobilization drive. At the time, 12 percent of the population held party membership, an abnormally large number for a communist country and a figure only comparable to Romania. Later figures have not been made publicly available, but membership today is estimated at 6.5 million. The WPK is the largest party represented in the Supreme People's Assembly and coexists with two other legal parties that are completely subservient to the WPK and must accept the WPK's "leading role" as a condition of their existence.

North Korean society is divided into three classes: industrial workers, peasants, and samuwon (intelligentsia and petite bourgeoisie). Since 1948, industrial workers have constituted the largest percentage of party members, followed by peasants and samuwon. Beginning in the 1970s, when North Korea's population reached the 50-per cent-urban mark, the composition of the party's groups changed; more people working in state-owned enterprises were party members, and the number of members in agricultural cooperatives decreased.

== Symbols ==
The emblem of the WPK is an adaptation of the communist hammer and sickle, with a traditional Korean calligraphy brush. The symbols represent the three classes in Korean society, as described by the WPK: the industrial workers (hammer), the peasants (sickle), and the samuwon (ink brush). The samuwon class consists of clerks, small traders, bureaucrats, professors, and writers. This class is unique to North Korean class analysis and was conceptualized to increase education and literacy among the country's population.

The party's official anthem is titled "Long Live the Workers' Party of Korea" (조선로동당 만세) and was composed in 1980.

== Election results ==
The following data are the seat numbers submitted by North Korea to the United Nations. According to North Korea historian Fyodor Tertitskiy, this data is likely falsified as deputies are simply described as WPK members inside North Korea, without mentions of the smaller parties.

Supreme People's Assembly elections
Election	Party leader	Seats	+/–	Position
1948	Kim Il Sung	157 / 572	▲157	▲1st
1957	Kim Il Sung	178 / 215	▲21	1st
1962	Kim Il Sung	371 / 383	▲193	1st
1967	Kim Il Sung	288 / 457	▼83	1st
1972	Kim Il Sung	127 / 541	▼161	1st
1977	Kim Il Sung	—N/a	—N/a	1st
1982	Kim Il Sung	—N/a	—N/a	1st
1986	Kim Il Sung	—N/a	—N/a	1st
1990	Kim Il Sung	601 / 687		1st
1998	Kim Jong Il	594 / 687	▼7	1st
2003	Kim Jong Il	—N/a	—N/a	1st
2009	Kim Jong Il	606 / 687		1st
2014	Kim Jong Un	607 / 687	▲1	1st
2019	Kim Jong Un	—N/a	—N/a	1st
2026	Kim Jong Un	671 / 687		1st

== See also ==
- Communism in Korea
- Elections in North Korea
- Politics of North Korea
- List of political parties in North Korea
- Anti-Imperialist National Democratic Front
- Pyongyang Sports Club
