= Workers' Party of North Korea =

Former communist party in North Korea

Workers' Party of North Korea 북조선로동당
- Chairman: Kim Tu-bong
- Vice Chairmen: Kim Il Sung; Chu Yong-ha; Ho Ka-i
- Founded: 28 August 1946
- Dissolved: 24 June 1949
- Merger of: Communist Party of North Korea; New People's Party of Korea
- Merged into: Workers' Party of Korea
- Headquarters: Pyongyang
- Newspaper: Rodong Sinmun; Kunroja
- Youth wing: Democratic Youth League of North Korea
- Pioneer wing: North Korean Children's Union
- Labour wing: General Federation of Trade Unions of North Korea
- Membership (1946): 366,000
- Ideology: Communism; Marxism-Leninism
- National affiliation: Fatherland United Democratic Front
- Colors: Red

Party flag

- Workers' Party of North Korea
- Chosŏn'gŭl: 북조선로동당
- Hancha: 北朝鮮勞動黨
- Revised Romanization: Bukjoseon Rodongdang
- McCune–Reischauer: Pukchosŏn Rodongdang

The Workers' Party of North Korea (Korean: 북조선로동당; Hancha: 北朝鮮勞動黨) was a Marxist-Leninist communist party in North Korea from 1946 to 1949 and was a predecessor of the current Workers' Party of Korea. It was founded at a congress on 28–30 August 1946, by the merger of the Communist Party of North Korea (created earlier that year after the northern branch of the Communist Party of Korea became independent from the Central Committee in Seoul) and the New People's Party of Korea. Kim Tu-bong, the leader of the New People's Party, was elected chairman of the party, while Chu Yong-ha and Kim Il Sung were elected as vice chairmen. At the time of establishment, the party is believed to have had about 366,000 members organized in around 12,000 party cells.

== Merger ==
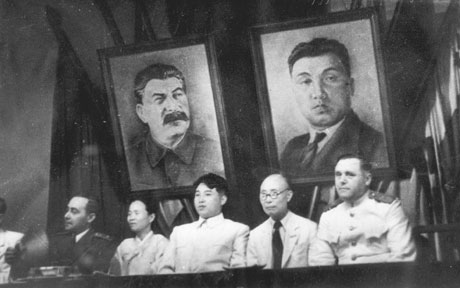
Founding joint plenum of the New People's Party and the North Korea Bureau of the Communist Party of Korea on 28 August 1946

The merger of the North Korea Bureau of the Communist Party of Korea and the New People's Party can be seen as analogous to similar mergers taking place in Eastern Europe in the years following the Second World War, such as the formation of the Socialist Unity Party of Germany and the Hungarian Working People's Party. The merger of the two parties was not uncomplicated. Between the two there were differences in terms of social background of cadres and ideological profiles. The New People's Party had a significant following of intellectuals whereas the Communist Party was mainly based amongst workers and peasants. Moreover, the Korean communists had been riddled by internal differences, and different communist factions were present in the new unified party. At the time of the founding of the new party discussions emerged on the role of Marxism–Leninism as the ideological foundation of the party. At the inaugural congress of the party, Kim Il Sung stated that "…the Workers Party is a combat unit and the vanguard of the working masses. We must fight with our utmost to maintain the Party's purity, unity, and iron discipline. If we were to fight against the enemy without meeting these conditions within our ranks, it would be nothing less than folly.", arguing in favor of maintaining a Marxist–Leninist orientation.

== Factionalism ==
Roughly speaking, the party consisted of four separate internal factions, the Soviet Koreans faction, the Domestic faction, the Yan'an (or Chinese) faction and the Guerrilla faction. These factional divisions were largely inherited from the Communist Party of Korea, and one of them (the 'domestic' faction) was also prevalent in the Workers Party of South Korea:

- The Soviet Koreans (소련파; lit. 'Soviet Faction'), led by Ho Ka-i, were made up of waves of ethnic Koreans who were born or raised in Russia after their families moved there starting in the 1870s. Some of them had returned to Korea covertly as Communist operatives in the 1920s and 1930s but most were members of the Red Army or civilians who were stationed in North Korea following World War II. Many came as translators or as Russian language instructors. This grouping had played an important role in building up the party structure of the Communist Party in Pyongyang directly after the Second World War.
- The Domestic faction, were Korean communists who never left the country but engaged in a struggle against the Japanese occupation. Many members of the domestic faction had spent time in Japanese military prisons as a result of their activities. Prominent members of this faction were O Ki-sop, Chong Tal-hyon, Yi Chu-ha, Chu Yong-ha (Vice Chairman of the party), Kim Yong-bom, Pak Chong-ae, Chang Shi-u and Yi Chu-yon. This grouping was politically tied to the old leadership of the Communist Party of Korea based in Seoul, at this point represented by the Workers Party of South Korea led by Pak Hon-yong.
- The Yan'an faction, led first by Mu Chong and then by Kim Tu-bong and Choe Chang-ik, were those Korean exiles who had lived in China's Shaanxi province and joined the Chinese Communist Party whose regional headquarters were at Yanan. They had formed their own party, the North-Chinese League for the Independence of Korea, and when they returned to North Korea from exile they formed the New People's Party which later merged with the Communist Party in 1946. Many members of the Yanan faction had fought in the Chinese 8th and New 4th Armies and thus had close relations with Mao Zedong.
- The Guerrilla faction, led by Kim Il Sung, was made up of former Korean guerrillas who had been active in Manchuria after it was occupied by Japan in 1931. Many in this group ended up fleeing Manchuria, as their armed resistance was suppressed, and moved to the Soviet Union where many of them, including Kim, were drafted into the Red Army. At about 130 to 140 members, it was initially the weakest of the factions, but eventually ended up on top as the leading faction.

The factions were represented proportionately in the leading bodies of the party. In the first politburo of the party the Soviet faction had three members, the Yanan faction had six, the domestic faction had two and the guerrilla faction had two. The guerrilla faction was actually the smallest of the factions in the Central Committee but they had the advantage of having Kim Il Sung, who led the North Korean government and was highly influential within the party. Moreover, Kim Il Sung was backed by the Soviet Union.

== United Front and participation in government ==
Party membership booklet

Both parties had belonged to the North Korean Fatherland United Democratic Front, and the unified party became a dominant force in the front after the merger. The party held 36% of the seats in the People's Assembly of North Korea and Kim Tu-bong became the Chairman of the Assembly. Kim Il Sung became the Chairman of the People's Committee of North Korea, the provisional government structure. In the Village People's Committee and Ward People's Committee elections of 1947, 57.7% of the 70 454 seats were held by members of the Workers Party.

At the meeting of the Presidium of the Central Committee of the Party on 16 September 1947, Kim Il Sung gave a speech of the cultural policy of the party. The speech was later published as 'On Developing Literature and the Arts and Activating Mass Cultural Work', and remains the basis for cultural policy in the DPRK.

== Second Congress ==
In early 1947, a purge was undertaken against the 'domestic' communist faction. Between 40,000 and 60,000 party members were expelled.

The party held its second congress from 27 to 30 March 1948. By the time of the second party congress, the party claimed 725,762 members, organized in 29,762 party cells.

At the second party congress, leading members of the 'domestic' communist faction such as O Ki-sop, Chong Tal-hyon, Ch'oe Yong-dal and Yi Pong-su were attacked by Kim Il Sung. O Ki-sop was re-elected to the party central committee, but relegated to a post in a minor government enterprise.

Addressing the congress, Kim Il Sung stated in his attack on the 'domestic' faction that "Our Party recognized that in order to carry out the proper political duties the scattered and organisationally weak local and provincial organisations must be united under a strong central organisation in North Korea. Hence it was decided in the middle of October 1945, that the North Korean Central Committee of the Korean Communist Party be established. But some of the comrades in the Party were captivated by the sectarianism of the past. They were living, just as in the past, the life of egocentricity and self-importance, confined within their small local groups, without carrying out any Party work or obeying superior organisations. Therefore, leaders of these small groups, whose vision was adjusted to their caves and who were addicted to individual heroism, opposed the establishment of the North Korean Central Bureau on the excuse that they "support the central headquarters (in Seoul)." In order to hide their schemes, [they] alleged that "establishment of the North Korean branch would result in dividing the Party.""

== Foundation of DPRK and merger into the Workers' Party of Korea ==
When the Supreme People's Assembly met in early September 1948, 102 out of 212 delegates came from the Workers Party. The Supreme People's Assembly declared the foundation of the Democratic People's Republic of Korea, with Workers Party vice-chairman Kim Il Sung as its prime minister.

On 24 June 1949 the party merged with the Workers' Party of South Korea, forming the Workers' Party of Korea.

== Mass organizations ==
The party managed a wide network of mass organizations, including the Democratic Youth League of North Korea, the North Korean General Federation of Labour Unions, the Democratic Women's Union of North Korea and the North Korean Federation of the Peasants Associations. The formation of these organizations had preceded the foundation of the party in August 1946. The party also managed a Consumers' Cooperative Society.

== Organs ==
The party published Rodong Sinmun and Kunroja. The decision to start these publications was taken at the first party congress. Rodong Sinmun was the mass newspaper of the party, whereas Kunroja was the theoretical magazine of the party. Both organs were later taken over by the Workers' Party of Korea.
