= Kim Tu-bong =

Korean linguist and politician (1886–1958?)

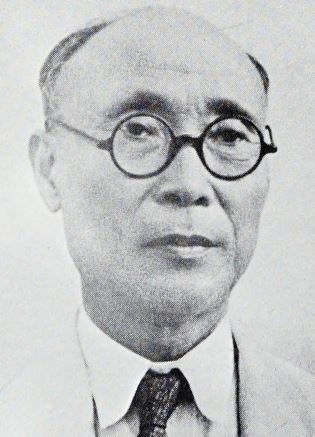
- Kim in 1955

Chairman of the Workers' Party of North Korea Central Committee
- In office 28 August 1946 – 30 June 1949
- Preceded by: Office established
- Succeeded by: Kim Il Sung

Chairman of the Standing Committee of the Supreme People's Assembly
- In office 9 September 1948 – 20 September 1957
- Preceded by: Office established
- Succeeded by: Choe Yong-gon

Personal details
- Born: 16 February 1889 Busan, Joseon
- Died: between March 1958 and 1960 (aged 69–71) North Korea
- Party: Workers' Party of Korea (1949–1958); Workers' Party of North Korea (1946–1949); New People's Party of Korea (1946); Chinese Communist Party (1937–1945)

Korean name
- Hangul: 김두봉
- Hanja: 金枓奉
- RR: Gim Dubong
- MR: Kim Tubong

Art name
- Hangul: 백연
- Hanja: 白淵
- RR: Baekyeon
- MR: Paegyŏn

Kim Tu-bong (Korean: 김두봉; Hanja: 金枓奉; 16 February 1889 – March 1958 or later) was the first Chairman of the Workers' Party of North Korea (one of two predecessors of today's Workers' Party of Korea, the other being Workers' Party of South Korea) from 1946 to 1949. He was known in South Korean history as a linguist, scholar, revolutionary and politician. His most famous work was under Chu Sigyŏng; later, after participating in the March First Movement, he with other Korean leaders of the time established a provisional government-in-exile in China, and because of his communist beliefs he played an important role in the early North Korean communist government.

He and other members of the Yan'an faction formed the New People's Party when they returned from exile. After the New People's Party merged into the Workers Party of North Korea (WPNK) in 1946 at the 1st WPNK Congress, he became WPNK Chairman. He was the first head of state (Chairman of the Standing Committee of the Supreme People's Assembly) of North Korea from 1948 to 1957. He is most remembered in South Korea for his efforts in establishing the Korean linguistic field and especially that of Hangul. Much of his work both political and linguistically was done while living in China with the exiled government of Korea. He is also known by his pen name Baekyeon. He was purged by Kim Il Sung in 1957.

== Early childhood and education ==
Born on 2 February 1889, in South Korea's South Gyeongsang Province, near modern-day Busan, he spent his early years being homeschooled during the time of imperial rule. He would move to Seoul at the age of 20 (1908) to attend both Geho School and Baechae School and in that same year graduate from Bogo High School. While he was in Seoul he would join the Korea Youth organization in 1913 and the following year (1914) leave Baechae School. He was also an editor for the So nyoun magazine.

== Early linguistic work ==
After graduating from Bosungkobo (Bosung College) in 1908, Kim Tu-bong worked closely with a linguistics professor from Bosungkobo named Chu Sigyŏng, who was at that time beginning his work in the study of Hangul, for which his name would later be known, as he would dedicate his life to bring it about (the Korean script made by King Sejong during the 15th century). He also worked as a teacher. In 1916 he spent a majority of his time working on compiling MalMoi, the first Korean dictionary.

== Shanghai and the exiled Korean government ==
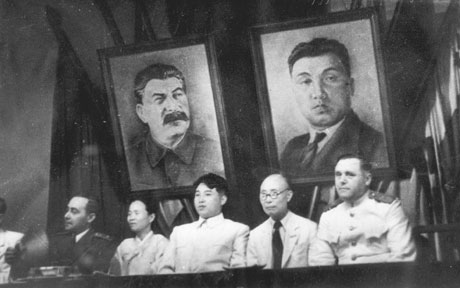
Kim Tu-bong (right) sitting next to Kim Il Sung (center)

After the 1919 March First Movement, he and other members of the independence club fled into China and in April 1919 set up a provisional government in Shanghai. During that time, he was first exposed to communism and eventually accepted it in 1920 after he had first supported the Democratic Party. In 1924, he was entrusted with the department of children education and schooling where he served as the president and also taught both Korean and Korean History. After the Japanese invaded China he and other members of the Korean government in Shanghai fled to Yan'an, headquarters of the Chinese Communist Party, and Kim would become the head of the independence club and a very important figure in combining the conflicting views of both communist and democratic ideas.

== Return home and the new government ==
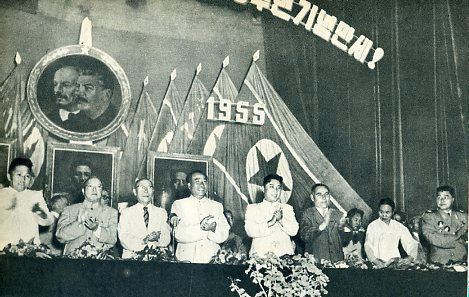
From left to right: Pak Chang-ok, Li Jishen, Kim Tu-bong, Zhu De, Kim Il Sung, Averky Aristov, Pak Chŏng Ae, and Choe Yong-gon in 1955.

The December following World War II and the Japanese's surrender (15 August 1945) Kim Tu-bong and other members returned to the now-divided Korea. Like many other communist-minded people of the time, Kim Tu-bong and other communist leaders took residence in what is now North Korea under the Soviet occupation. In February 1946, Kim Tu-bong became the chairman of the New People's Party. Later that year in August, it merged to form the Workers' Party. He would become the chairman in 1948, but from the outset the real power was held by Premier Kim Il Sung.

Kim Il Sung became chairman of the Workers' Party after it had merged with its southern counterpart in 1949, thus becoming in name as well as in fact the country's leader. In most communist states, the party leader is understood to be the most powerful man in the country.

== Disappearance and death ==
After the Korean War, Kim Tu-bong had served his usefulness in the government, and, whether real or imagined, many scholars believe that he had become a perceived threat to Kim Il Sung's dictatorship. Rumors began that it had to do with a scandal, as he had married a much younger woman later in life. Whatever the reason, he was purged in March 1958, accused of involvement in the 1956 August Faction Incident. Like many others of Kim Il Sung's political opponents, he disappeared with no records to indicate whether he had been sentenced to hard labor or exile. He is believed either to have been executed or to have died sometime in the 1960s in detention within North Korea.

== Popular culture ==
- Portrayed by actor Park Yeong-ji in the 1981–82 TV series, 1st Republic.

== See also ==
- Cold War
- Korean independence movement
