= 1st Supreme People's Assembly of North Korea =

Inaugural term of North Korea's Supreme People's Assembly

1st Supreme People's Assembly
- Sign of the Supreme People's Assembly

2 September 1948 – 18 September 1957 (9 years, 16 days) Overview
- Type: Session of the Supreme People's Assembly
- Election: 25 August 1948

Leadership
- Chairman: Kim Tu-bong
- Vice Chairmen: Kim Ung-gi; Yi Kuk-no; Hong Nam-pyo; Hong Ki-ju

Members
- Total: 572 deputies

The 1st Supreme People's Assembly (SPA) was elected on 25 August 1948 and convened for its first session on 2 September 1948. It was replaced on 18 September 1957 by the 2nd Supreme People's Assembly. It convened for its first meeting on 2–10 1948, which discussed and adopted the constitution of the Democratic People's Republic of Korea.

== Meetings ==
Meeting	Start–end	Length	Session agenda
1st Session	2–10 September 1948	9 days	18 items 2 September: 1. Approval of session agenda.; 2. Elections.; 1. Election of Chairman of the SPA Draft Constitutional Committee; 1. Kim Tu-bong elected as Chairman.; 2. Election of Chairman of the SPA Rules Committee; 1. Kang Yang-uk elected as Chairman.; 3. Election of members to the Credentials Committee; 1. Election result not made public.; 3 September: 1. Debate on the draft constitution; Kim Chaek, Yi Sung-yop, Song Pong-uk, Pak Hon-yong, Chu Yong-ha, Ho Hon, Hong Myong-hui, Chong Chun-taek "and others" participated in the discussion.; 4 September: 1. Debate on approval of the Credentials Committee's report.; 2. Reading of celebratory messages.; 3. First reading of the proposed constitution.; 5 September: 1. Second reading of the proposed constitution.; 6 September: 1. Report by Kim Tu-bong.; 2. Further discussion on the draft constitution and its 20 chapters and 104 articles.; 7 September: 1. Last discussion on the draft constitution before the vote.; 8 September: 1. Vote on the adoption of the draft constitution; 1. Proposed constitution approved unanimously.; 2. Elections.; 1. Election of Chairman of the Supreme People's Assembly; 1. Ho Hon is elected as Chairman.; 2. Election of Chairman of the Standing Committee of the Supreme People's Assembly; 1. Kim Tu-bong elected as Chairman.; 3. Election of members of the 1st Standing Committee of the Supreme People's Assembly: 1. Kim Tu-bong, Hong Nam-pyo, Hong Ki-ju, Kang Yang-uk, Kang Chin-gon, Song Chu-sik, Ku Chae-su, Yi Ku-hun, Pak Chong-ae, Kim Chang-jun, Chang Sun-myong, Chang Kwon, Yu Yong-jun, Pak Yun-gil, Na Sung-gyu, Choe Kyong-dok, Yi Nung-jong, Kim Pyong-je, Yi Ki-yong, Kang Sun and Cho Un as members.; 4. Election of the Premier of the Cabinet; 1. Kim Il Sung elected as Premier.; 9 September: 1. Elections.; 1. Kim Il-sung as Premier proposes the composition of the 1st Cabinet of North Korea; 1. Proposal approved.; 2. Election of justices of the People's Supreme Court; 1. Election results not made public, but Kim Ik-son elected as Chief Justice.; 3. Election of Procurator-General; 1. Chang Hae-u elected as Procurator-General.; 4. Election of the Legislative Committee; 1. Election results not made public.; 5. Election of a committee to draft a statement that called for the immediate withdrawal of American and Soviet troops from Korean soil; 1. Election results not made public.; 2. Adoption of a regulation pertaining to the rights and duties of Supreme People's Assembly deputies.; 10 September: 1. Report by Kim Il-sung on the political position of North Korea.; 2. Decision on giving amnesty in North Korea.; 3. Adoption of a statement calling for the immediate withdrawal of American and Soviet troops from Korea.; 4. The 1st Cabinet, through the Premier, nominates an ambassador to the United Nations; Election results not made public.
2nd Session	28 January – 1 February 1949	4 days	11 items 28 January: 1. Approval of session agenda.; 2. Report by Chong Chun-taek, the Chairman of the State Planning Commission, known as "On the Results of 1948 Economic Plan and the 1949–50 Economic Plan for the People's Economic Rehabilitation and Development in the Northern Half of the DPRK".; 29 January: 1. Formation of a twenty-five member Basic Committee tasked with drafting a bill on the completion of the 1948 plan and the 1949–50 plan for economic reconstruction and development.; 1. Election of Chairman of the Basic Committee; 1. Kim Tu-bong elected as Chairman.; 2. Election of remaining members; 1. Election result not made public.; 2. Report by Pak Hon-yong, the Minister of Foreign Affairs, on North Korea's foreign policy.; 31 January: 1. Discussion and approval of Pak Hon-yong's report.; 2. Report in the election of people's committees at the provincial, municipal, country and village level.; 3. On reforms in the administrative districts, and the creation of Chagang-di county and Najin county of Hamgyong Pukto.; 4. Discussion and approval report on general amnesty.; 5. Elections.; 1. Election of a Justice to the People's Supreme Court; 1. Election result not made public.; 2. Election of a 20-strong jury of the People's Supreme Court; 1. Election result not made public.; 1 February: 1. Approval of the bill "On the Results of the 1948 Economic Plan and the 1949–50 Economic Plan for Economic Rehabilitation and Development in the Northern Half of the DPRK".; 2. Concluding speech by Kim Il-sung, known as "Completion of the Two-Year People's Economic Plan is the Materialistic Guarantee of Fatherland Unification".
3rd Session	19–23 April 1949	4 days	6 items 19 April: 1. Choe Chang-ik, the Minister of State Control, delivered the "Report on the National Budget for the 1948 Fiscal Year and the Proposed National Budget for the 1949 Fiscal Year".; 20 April: 1. Discussion of Choe Chang-ik's report.; 21 April: 1. Report by Kim Il-sung, known as "Report of the Delegates of the Democratic People's Republic of Korea on Their Visit to the Soviet Union".; 22 April: 1. Debate and approval of Kim Il-sung's report.; 23 April: 1. Approval of the state budget.; 2. Approval on holding elections at the provincial, municipal, country and district level to the people's committees.
4th Session	8–10 September 1949	3 days	5 items 8 September: 1. Kim Il-sung delivered the "Report on the First Anniversary of the DPRK".; 9 September: 1. A statement is made, and approved, that supports Kim Il-sung's aforementioned report.; 2. A committee to draft a law on compulsory elementary education is established, and Hong Myong-hui is elected its chairman.; 10 September: 1. The deputies discuss the proposed law on compulsory elementary education and approves it.; 2. Several bills are approved, such as determining the penalty for the use of counterfeit currencies, alteration of income taxes and others.
5th Session	25 February – 3 March 1950	7 days	12 items 25 February: 1. Chong Chun-taek delivered "Report on the 1949–50 Economic Plan for the Development and Rehabilitation of the People's Economy".; 27 February: 1. Approval of various decrees issued by the 1st Cabinet.; 28 February: 1. Report by Choe Chang-ik on the 1949 fiscal year and the proposed state budget for 1950.; 2. Debate on budget report by deputy Kim Che-won, who proposes a state bond of 1,5 billion won to cover budget deficit.; 3. An Investigation Committee to inspect the proposed state budget for 1950 is established.; Kim Il-sung is elected the committee's chairman.; 1 March: 1. Report by Investigation Committee delivered.; Report approved.; 2. Report delivered on the "Law on Arganisation of the Courts".; 1. The report and the aforementioned law approved.; 3. Report on the "Law on Criminals" and the "Law on Criminal Appeals".; 1. Report approved.; 2 March: 1. Discussion on the "Law on Criminals", which contained 23 chapters and 301 articles.; 1. Law approved.; 3 March: 1. Discussion on the "Law on Criminal Appeals", which contained 25 chapters.; 1. Law approved.; 2. Report by Han Sol-ya, known as "Approval of the Peace Preservation Statement by the World Peace Preservation Congress".; 1. Report approved.; 3. Discussion of decrees issued by the 1st Standing Committee between the 4th and 5th sessions.; 1. Decrees approved.
6th Session	20–22 December 1953	3 days	5 items 20 December: 1. Report by Kim Il-sung, known as "On the Work of the Delegates of the Democratic People's Republic of Korea Dispatched to the U.S.S.R., the People's Republic of China, and other Friendly Countries".; 21 December: 1. Discussion of Kim Il-sung's report.; 22 December: 1. Further discussion of Kim Il-sung's report.; 1. Approval of the report.; 2. Discussion of decrees issued by the 1st Standing Committee between the 5th and 6th sessions.; 1. Decrees approved.; 3. By-election to the 1st Standing Committee; 1. Kim Ung-gi, Yi Kuk-no, Choe Won-taek, Won Hong-gu, Kang Ung-jin, Chon Yun-do, Yu Hae-bung and Mun Tu-jae were elected as members.
7th Session	20–23 April 1954	4 days	9 items 20 April: 1. Report by Pak Chang-ok, the Chairman of the State Planning Commission, known as "On the Three-Year, 1954–56, Economic Plan of the DPRK".; 21 April: 1. Discussion of Pak Chang-ok's report.; 22 April: 1. Report by Choe Chang-ik, on the state budget for 1950, 1951, 1952 and 1953 and a proposal for the 1954 state budget.; 2. Election of a 25-strong Investigation Committee, headed by Kim Chang-jun, to examine the state budget proposal.; 23 April: 1. Approval of the Pak Chang-ok's report.; 2. Report by Kim Chang-jun.; 3. Approval of Choe Chang-ik's report.; 4. Report by Kang Yang-uk on the decrees issued by the 1st Standing Committee between SPA the 6th and 7th sessions.; 1. Report approved.; 5. Approval of a law to amend and add provisions to Article 37, Paragraph 8 and Article 58 of the Constitution of North Korea.
8th Session	28–30 October 1954	3 days	6 items 28 October: 1. Report by Minister of Foreign Affairs Nam Il, known as "On the Work of the Delegates of the DPRK at the Geneva Conference for the Peaceful Settlement of the Korean Question".; 29 October: 1. Discussion of Nam Il's report.; Approved.; 30 October: 1. Writing a passage of declaration to the National Assembly of South Korea and other socio-political forces in the country.; Approved.; 2. Debate on the draft laws on regional organisation, and amendments to Article 36 and Chapter 5 of the North Korean constitution.; Approved.; 3. Debate on administrative boundaries within North Korea, and the division of Hwanghaedo into Hwanghae and Hwanghae Pukto and to establish Yanggangdo.; Approved.; 4. Discussion of decrees issued by the 1st Standing Committee between the 7th and 8th sessions.; Approved.
9th Session	9–11 March 1955	3 days	10 items 9 March: Debate on the declaration of the 2nd Session of the 4th Supreme Soviet of the Soviet Union.; Election of a member draft committee to write a response to the Soviet declaration; Pak Chong-ae elected as chair and twelve other members elected.; 1. Report by Minister of Finance Yi Chu-yon on the state budget for 1954 and proposal for the state budget for 1955; Debate on the report delivered by Yi Chu-yon; Election of an Investigative Committee to examine the proposed state budget.; 10 March: 1. The Investigate Committee delivers a report on the state budget; The report is approved as well as the proposed state budget.; 2. Report by Minister of Education Paek Nam-un, known as "On the Massive Training Program of Scientific and Technical Cadres for the Post-war People's Economic Development and Rehabilitation Plan and Preparation for General Compulsory Elementary Education".; 11 March: 1. Discussion of Paek Nam-un's report.; The report is approved.; 2. Remarks by Kim Il-sung on the peaceful reunification of the two Koreas.; 3. Report by Minister of Justice Hong Ki-ju, on revising articles 2, 3, 48, 53, 58 and 83 of the North Korean constitution.; In connection with the amendment of Article 58, a Law on Cabinet Organisation is put forth.; Both report and proposed law are approved.; 4. Discussion of decrees issued by the 1st Standing Committee between the 8th and 9th sessions.; Approved.; 5. Election of Chief Justice of the People's Supreme Court to replace Kim Ik-son; Cho Song-mo is elected as a replacement.; 6. Response to the declaration of the 2nd Session of the 4th Supreme Soviet of the Soviet Union is discussed; Response is approved.
10th Session	20–23 December 1955	4 days	4 items: 1. Report by Vice Premier and Minister of Agriculture Kim Il, on the continued advancement of agricultural management.; Approved.; 2. Report by Standing Committee member Pak Chong-ae on the tax-in-kind in the agricultural sector.; Approved.; 3. Report by Minister of Finance Yi Chu-yon, on a proposed income tax on citizens.; Approved.; 4. Discussion of decrees issued by the 1st Standing Committee between the 9th and 10th sessions.; Approved.
11th Session	10–13 March 1956	4 days	6 items 10 March: 1. Report by Minister of Finance Yi Chu-yon proposing the 1956 state budget.; 2. Election of an Investigative Committee to examine the proposed state budget.; Election organised.; 12 March: 1. The Investigate Committee reports on its findings.; Report and proposal approved.; 13 March: 1. Report by Vice Minister of Finance Yun Hyong-sik on establishing local self-government taxation.; Report approved.; 2. Discussion of decrees issued by the 1st Standing Committee between the 10th and 11th sessions.; Approved.; 3. Election of Chief Justice of the People's Supreme Court to replace Cho Song-mo; Hwang Se-hwan is elected as a replacement.
12th Session	5–7 November 1956	3 days	3 items: Report by Supreme People's Assembly delegation that visited the Soviet Union.; Approved.; 1. Debate on the appeal of the 4th Supreme Soviet of the Soviet Union to all nations to reduce armaments production.; Approved.; 2. Discussion of decrees issued by the 1st Standing Committee between the 11th and 12th sessions.; Approved.
13th Session	14–16 March 1957	3 days	2 items: 1. Debate on the final account of 1955 and proposed state budget for 1957.; 2. Discussion of decrees issued by the 1st Standing Committee between the 12th and 13th sessions.; Approved.

== Officers ==
=== Chairman ===
Name	Hangul	Took office	Left office	Duration
Ho Hon	허헌	10 September 1948	16 August 1951	2 years and 340 days
Ri Yong	이용	22 December 1953	20 September 1957	3 years and 272 days

=== Vice Chairman ===
Name	Hangul	Took office	Left office	Duration
Kim Tal-hyon	김달현	10 September 1948	22 December 1953	5 years and 103 days
Ri Yong	이용	10 September 1948	22 December 1953	5 years and 103 days
Ri Yu-min	이유민	22 December 1953	20 September 1957	3 years and 272 days
Hong Ki-hwang	홍기황	22 December 1953	20 September 1957	3 years and 272 days

== Deputies ==
Rank	Name	Hangul	2nd SPA	1st SPA		Workers' Party of Korea						Other
Rank	Name	Hangul	2nd SPA	1st CAB	1st STC	1st CC	1st POL	1st STC	2nd CC	2nd POL	2nd STC	Other
1	Kim Il Sung	김일성	Reelected	Premier	—	Member	Member	Member	Member	Member	Member	Organ
2	Kim Tu-bong	김두봉	Reelected	—	Chairman	Member	Member	Member	Member	Member	Member	Organ
3	Ho Hon	허헌	Died	—	—	WPSK	—	—	Member	Member	—	O–SPA
4	Kim Tal-hyon	김달현	Reelected	Member	—	—	—	—	—	—	—	O–SPA
5	Ri Yong	이용	Reelected	—	—	—	—	—	—	—	—	O–SPA
6	Hong Nam-pyo	홍남표	Dead	—	Member	WPSK	—	—	Member	—	—	—
7	Hong Ki-ju	홍기주	Not	—	Member	—	—	—	—	—	—	—
8	Pak Hon-yong	박헌영	Purged	Member	—	WPSK	—	—	Member	Member	—	Organ
9	Hong Myong-hui	홍명희	Reelected	Member	—	—	—	—	—	—	—	—
10	Kim Chaek	김책	Died	Member	—	Member	—	Member	Member	Member	Member	Organ
11	Kang Yang-uk	강량욱	Reelected	—	Member	—	—	—	—	—	—	—
12	Kang Sun	강선	Not	—	Member	—	—	—	—	—	—	—
13	Kang Chin-gon	강양욱	Reelected	—	Member	Member	—	—	Member	—	—	—
14	Ku Chae-su	구채수	Purged	—	Member	WPSK	—	—	Member	—	—	—
15	Kim Pyong-je	김평제	Reelected	—	Member	—	—	—	—	—	—	—
16	Kim Chang-jun	김창준	Reelected	—	Member	—	—	—	—	—	—	—
17	Na Sung-gyu	나성규	Reelected	—	Member	—	—	—	—	—	—	—
18	Yu Yong-jun	유용준	Reelected	—	Member	WPSK	—	—	Member	—	—	—
19	Yi Ku-hun	이구훈	Not	—	Member	—	—	—	—	—	—	—
20	Yi Ki-yong	리기영	Reelected	—	Member	—	—	—	—	—	—	—
21	Yi Nung-jong	이능종	Not	—	Member	—	—	—	—	—	—	—
22	Pak Yun-gil	박윤길	Not	—	Member	—	—	—	—	—	—	—
23	Pak Chong-ae	박정애	Reelected	—	Member	Member	—	Member	Member	Member	Member	—
24	Song Chu-sik	송주식	Reelected	—	Member	—	—	—	—	—	—	—
25	Chang Kwon	권창	Not	—	Member	—	—	—	—	—	—	—
26	Chang Sun-myong	장선명	Not	—	Member	Member	—	—	Member	—	—	Control
27	Cho Un	조은	Not	—	Member	—	—	—	—	—	—	—
28	Choe Kyong-dok	최경독	Not	—	Member	Member	—	—	Member	—	—	—
29	Chong Chun-taek	정준택	Reelected	Member	—	—	—	—	—	—	—	—
30	Choe Yong-gon	최용건	Reelected	Member	—	—	—	—	—	—	—	—
31	Kim Won-bong	김원봉	Reelected	Member	—	—	—	—	—	—	—	—
32	Pak Il-u	박일우	Purged	Member	—	Member	—	Member	Member	Member	Member	Organ
33	Pak Mun-gyu	박문규	Reelected	Member	—	WPSK	—	—	Member	—	—	—
34	Chang Si-u	장시우	Purged	Member	—	Member	—	—	—	—	—	—
35	Chu Yong-ha	주영하	Purged	Member	—	Member	Member	Member	Member	Member	Member	—
36	Choe Chang-ik	최창익	Not	Member	—	Member	Member	Member	Member	Member	Member	Organ
37	Paek Nam-un	백남운	Reelected	Member	—	—	—	—	—	—	—	—
38	Kim Chong-ju	김정주	Not	Member	—	—	—	—	—	—	—	—
39	Yi Sung-yop	리승엽	Purged	Member	—	WPSK	—	—	Member	Member	—	Organ
40	Ho Jong-suk	허정숙	Reelected	Member	—	Member	—	—	Member	—	—	—
41	Ho Song-taek	허성택	Reelected	Member	—	WPSK	—	—	Member	—	—	—
42	Yi Pyong-nam	리병남	Reelected	Member	—	—	—	—	—	—	—	—
43	Yi Yong	리용	Not	Member	—	—	—	—	—	—	—	—
44	Yi Kuk-no	리극로	Reelected	—	Member	—	—	—	—	—	—	—
45	Chang Hae-u	장해우	Reelected	—	—	—	—	—	Member	—	—	Control
46	No Chin-han	노진한	Not	—	—	—	—	—	—	—	—	—
47	Kim Il	김일	Reelected	Member	—	Member	—	Member	Member	Member	Member	—
48	Pak Hun-il	박헌일	Not	—	—	Member	—	—	Member	—	—	—
49	Ho Ka-i	허가이	Died	Member	—	Member	Member	Member	Member	Member	Member	Organ
50	Pak Chang-sik	박창식	Reelected	—	—	Member	—	Member	Member	—	—	—
51	Kim O-song	김오송	Purged	—	—	WPSK	—	—	Member	—	—	—
52	Ko Hui-man	고휘만	Reelected	—	—	—	—	—	—	—	—	—
53	Pang Hak-se	방학세	Reelected	Member	—	—	—	—	Member	—	—	Control
54	Kang Kon	강건	Not	—	—	—	—	—	Member	—	—	—
55	Kang Ung-jin	강웅진	Not	—	Member	—	—	—	—	—	—	—
56	Yi Man-gyu	이만규	Reelected	—	Member	—	—	—	—	—	—	—
57	Kim Sam-yong	김삼룡	Not	—	—	WPSK	—	—	Member	Member	—	Organ
58	Pak Se-yong	박세용	Not	—	—	—	—	—	—	—	—	—
59	Kim Song-gyu	김송규	Not	—	—	—	—	—	—	—	—	—
60	Yun Haeng-jung	윤행정	Not	—	—	—	—	—	—	—	—	—
61	Kang Mun-sok	강문석	Purged	—	—	WPSK	—	—	Member	—	Member	—
62	Song Ul-su	송울수	Reelected	—	—	WPSK	—	—	Member	—	—	—
63	Kim Sang-hyok	김상혁	Reelected	—	—	WPSK	—	—	Member	—	—	—
64	Yi Tong-hwa	이통화	Reelected	—	—	—	—	—	Member	—	—	CIC–WPNK
65	Han Hyo-sam	한효삼	Not	—	—	—	—	—	—	—	—	—
66	Jong Il-ryong	정일룡	Reelected	Member	—	—	—	—	Member	—	Member	—
67	Yun Hyong-sik	윤형식	Not	—	—	—	—	—	Member	—	—	—
68	Yi Ki-sok	리기석	Reelected	Member	—	WPSK	—	—	Member	—	—	Control
69	Song Pong-uk	송퐁욱	Reelected	—	—	—	—	—	—	—	—	—
70	Kim Ung-gi	김웅기	Reelected	—	Member	—	—	—	Member	—	—	Control
71	Kim Chae-uk	김채욱	Not	—	—	Member	—	Member	Member	—	Member	—
72	Hong Ki-hwang	홍기황	Reelected	—	—	—	—	—	—	—	—	O–SPA
73	Yi Sok-bo	이속보	Not	—	—	—	—	—	—	—	—	—
74	Kim Yong-su	김용수	Reelected	—	—	—	—	—	—	—	—	—
75	Nam Il	남일	Reelected	Member	—	—	—	—	Member	—	Member	—
76	Yi Pyong-je	이평제	Not	—	—	—	—	—	—	—	—	—
77	Yi Yo-song	이요송	Reelected	—	—	—	—	—	—	—	—	—
78	Tak Chang-hyok	탁창혁	Not	—	—	—	—	—	—	—	—	—
79	Cho Yong-se	조용세	Not	—	—	—	—	—	—	—	—	—
80	Yi Sang-jun	이상준	Not	—	—	—	—	—	—	—	—	—
81	Kim Ki-do	김기도	Not	—	—	—	—	—	—	—	—	—
82	Kim Kwang-su	김광수	Purged	—	—	WPSK	—	—	Member	—	—	—
83	Choe Ik-han	최익한	Not	—	—	—	—	—	—	—	—	—
84	Yu Hae-bung	유해붕	Not	—	Member	—	—	—	—	—	—	—
85	Choe Chun-yong	최춘용	Not	—	—	—	—	—	—	—	—	—
86	Kim Yol	김열	Not	—	—	Member	—	—	Member	—	Member	Organ
87	Yi Hong-yol	이홍열	Reelected	—	—	—	—	—	—	—	—	—
88	Kim Chan	김찬	Not	—	—	—	—	—	Member	—	—	CIC–WPNK
89	Yun Chung-u	윤청우	Reelected	—	—	—	—	—	—	—	—	—
90	Choe Won-taek	최원택	Reelected	—	Member	—	—	—	Member	—	Member	CIC–WPSK
91	Chong Song-on	종송온	Reelected	Member	—	—	—	—	—	—	—	—
92	Yi Sik	이식	Not	—	—	—	—	—	—	—	—	—
93	Kim Hwang-il	김황일	Reelected	—	—	—	—	—	Member	—	Member	—
94	Kim Ki-ju	김기주	Not	—	—	—	—	—	—	—	—	—
95	Yi Chong-man	이종만	Reelected	—	—	—	—	—	—	—	—	—
96	Pak Yong-son	박용손	Not	—	—	—	—	—	Member	—	Member	—
97	Yi Yu-min	이유민	Reelected	—	—	—	—	—	Member	—	—	O–SPA
98	Pak Chang-ok	박창옥	Not	Member	—	—	—	—	Member	Member	Member	—
99	Yi Yong-jun	이용준	Not	—	—	—	—	—	—	—	—	—
100	Yi In-dong	이인동	Reelected	—	—	—	—	—	—	—	—	—
101	Cho Chung-gwang	조청광	Not	—	—	—	—	—	—	—	—	—
102	Yu Ki-sop	유기섭	Not	—	—	—	—	—	—	—	—	—
103	Yi Chom-sun	이춘선	Not	—	—	—	—	—	—	—	—	—
104	Chong No-sik	종노식	Reelected	—	—	—	—	—	—	—	—	—
105	Han Sang-muk	한상묵	Not	—	—	—	—	—	—	—	—	—
106	Kim Yong-jae	김용재	Not	—	—	WPSK	—	—	Member	—	—	—
107	Kim Yong-dam	김용담	Not	—	—	—	—	—	—	—	—	—
108	O Chae-yong	오채용	Not	—	—	—	—	—	—	—	—	—
109	Kim Ok-bin	김옥빈	Not	—	—	—	—	—	—	—	—	—
110	Choe Pong-su	최봉수	Reelected	—	—	—	—	—	Alternate	—	—	—
111	Hwang Tae-song	황태송	Not	—	—	—	—	—	Member	—	—	—
112	Han Il-su	한일수	Not	—	—	—	—	—	—	—	—	—
113	Kim Yong-wan	김용완	Not	—	—	—	—	—	—	—	—	—
114	Tae Song-su	태송수	Not	—	—	Member	—	—	Member	—	—	—
115	Yi Chu-yon	리주연	Reelected	Member	—	—	—	—	—	—	—	Auditing
116	Kim Sang-chol	김상철	Reelected	—	—	—	—	—	Member	—	—	—
117	Pak Sang-jun	박상준	Not	—	—	—	—	—	—	—	—	—
118	Kim Min-san	김민산	Not	—	—	Member	—	—	Member	—	—	—
119	Kim Yun-gol	김윤골	Not	—	—	—	—	—	—	—	—	—
120	Chon Chan-bae	전찬배	Not	—	—	—	—	—	—	—	—	—
121	Cho Hi-yong	조희용	Not	—	—	—	—	—	—	—	—	—
122	U Pong-un	유퐁운	Not	—	—	—	—	—	—	—	—	—
123	Yi Tae-song	이태송	Not	—	—	—	—	—	—	—	—	—
124	Hwang Uk	황욱	Not	—	—	—	—	—	—	—	—	—
125	Yi Chu-ha	이주하	Not	—	—	WPSK	—	—	Member	—	—	—
126	Chong Paek	백종	Not	—	—	—	—	—	—	—	—	—
127	No Sok-kwi	노속귀	Not	—	—	—	—	—	—	—	—	—
128	So Kap-sun	소갑선	Not	—	—	—	—	—	—	—	—	—
129	Cho Pom-gu	조폼구	Not	—	—	—	—	—	—	—	—	—
130	Han Sol-ya	한설야	Reelected	Member	—	Member	—	—	Member	—	—	—
131	Chu Hwang-sop	주황섭	Reelected	Member	—	—	—	—	—	—	—	—
132	Han Il-mu	한일무	Reelected	—	—	Member	—	—	Member	—	—	—
133	Pak Chi-ho	박치호	Not	—	—	—	—	—	—	—	—	—
134	Kim Chung-gyu	김충규	Not	—	—	—	—	—	—	—	—	—
135	Yi Mun-hwan	이문환	Not	—	—	—	—	—	—	—	—	—
136	Ok Yong-ja	옥용자	Not	—	—	—	—	—	—	—	—	—
137	Hong Myon-hu	홍면후	Not	—	—	—	—	—	—	—	—	—
138	Kim Son-gil	김손길	Not	—	—	—	—	—	—	—	—	—
139	Ham Ik-nok	함익녹	Not	—	—	—	—	—	—	—	—	—
140	Kim Won-hyong	김원형	Not	—	—	—	—	—	—	—	—	—
141	Pak Il-yong	박일용	Not	—	—	Member	—	—	—	—	—	—
142	Kim Song-ok	김송옥	Not	—	—	—	—	—	—	—	—	—
143	Kim Nam-chon	김남촌	Purged	—	—	—	—	—	—	—	—	—
144	Won Ho-sun	원호선	Not	—	—	—	—	—	—	—	—	—
145	Song Myong-hon	송명혼	Not	—	—	—	—	—	—	—	—	—
146	Choe Son-gyu	최선규	Not	—	—	—	—	—	—	—	—	—
147	Pak Chun-yong	박춘용	Not	—	—	—	—	—	—	—	—	—
148	Song Kyu-hwan	송규환	Not	—	—	—	—	—	—	—	—	—
149	Yi Won-il	이원일	Not	—	—	—	—	—	—	—	—	—
150	Chong Tae-sok	종태석	Not	—	—	—	—	—	—	—	—	—
151	Chae Chun-sok	채춘석	Not	—	—	—	—	—	—	—	—	—
152	Yi Yong-som	이용솜	Not	—	—	—	—	—	Member	—	—	—
153	Kim Su-hyon	김수현	Not	—	—	—	—	—	—	—	—	—
154	Won Man-su	원만수	Not	—	—	—	—	—	—	—	—	—
155	Chong Chol	종철	Not	—	—	—	—	—	—	—	—	—
156	Kim Il-chong	김일종	Not	—	—	—	—	—	—	—	—	—
157	Kim Sung-hyon	김성현	Not	—	—	—	—	—	—	—	—	—
158	Kim Hyong-gon	김형곤	Not	—	—	—	—	—	—	—	—	—
159	Kim Myong-sok	김명석	Not	—	—	—	—	—	—	—	—	—
160	Kim Song-hak	김송학	Not	—	—	—	—	—	—	—	—	—
161	Chong Un-yong	종운용	Not	—	—	—	—	—	—	—	—	—
162	Chong Un-yong	종운용	Not	—	—	—	—	—	—	—	—	—
163	Yi Kang-guk	이강국	Purged	—	—	—	—	—	—	—	—	—
164	O Ki-sop	오기섭	Reelected	—	—	Member	—	—	Member	—	—	—
165	Kim Hae-chon	김해촌	Not	—	—	—	—	—	—	—	—	—
166	Yi Sang-sun	이상순	Not	—	—	—	—	—	—	—	—	—
167	Kim Sang-ju	김상주	Not	—	—	—	—	—	—	—	—	—
168	Chu Hae	추해	Not	—	—	—	—	—	—	—	—	—
169	Yun Su	윤수	Not	—	—	—	—	—	—	—	—	—
170	Yi Hyok-yong	이혁용	Not	—	—	—	—	—	—	—	—	—
171	Pak Ki-ho	박기호	Not	—	—	—	—	—	—	—	—	—
172	Sin Nam-chol	신남철	Reelected	—	—	—	—	—	—	—	—	—
173	Chong Chu-gyong	종추경	Not	—	—	—	—	—	—	—	—	—
174	Yi Sul-chin	이설진	Not	—	—	—	—	—	—	—	—	—
175	Sin Yong-bok	신용복	Not	—	—	—	—	—	—	—	—	—
176	Choe Yong-dal	최용달	Not	—	—	—	—	—	—	—	—	CIC–WPNK
177	Kim Sung-mo	김성모	Not	—	—	—	—	—	—	—	—	—
178	Chong Chong-sik	종총식	Not	—	—	—	—	—	—	—	—	—
179	Cho Chae-han	조채한	Not	—	—	—	—	—	—	—	—	—
180	Kim Chae-rok	김채록	Not	—	—	—	—	—	—	—	—	—
181	Yi Tong-yong	이통용	Not	—	—	—	—	—	—	—	—	—
182	Won Hong-gu	원홍구	Reelected	—	Member	—	—	—	—	—	—	—
183	Kim Paek-tong	김백통	Not	—	—	—	—	—	—	—	—	—
184	Ho Nam-hu	호남후	Not	—	—	—	—	—	—	—	—	—
185	Paek Pong-son	백퐁손	Not	—	—	—	—	—	—	—	—	—
186	Choe Ung-yo	최웅요	Not	—	—	—	—	—	—	—	—	—
187	Yi Son-jae	이선재	Not	—	—	—	—	—	—	—	—	—
188	Yom Chong-gwon	염종권	Not	—	—	—	—	—	—	—	—	—
189	Yu Tong-yol	유통열	Not	—	—	—	—	—	—	—	—	—
190	Chang U-uk	장우욱	Not	—	—	—	—	—	—	—	—	—
191	Choe Song-hwan	최송환	Not	—	—	—	—	—	—	—	—	—
192	Yang Hong-ju	양홍주	Not	—	—	—	—	—	—	—	—	—
193	Yi Chil-song	이칠송	Not	—	—	—	—	—	—	—	—	—
194	Son Tong-gi	손통기	Not	—	—	—	—	—	—	—	—	—
195	Paek Pyong-ik	박평일	Not	—	—	—	—	—	—	—	—	—
196	Yi Chae-yong	이채용	Not	—	—	—	—	—	—	—	—	—
197	Choe Son-ja	최손자	Not	—	—	—	—	—	—	—	—	—
198	Kang Chun-sam	강춘삼	Not	—	—	—	—	—	—	—	—	—
199	Min Hyok-cho	민혁초	Not	—	—	—	—	—	—	—	—	—
200	Chong Chil-song	종칠송	Reelected	—	—	—	—	—	—	—	—	—
201	Kye Tong-son	계통손	Not	—	—	—	—	—	Alternate	—	—	—
202	Kim Ho-sun	김호선	Not	—	—	—	—	—	—	—	—	—
203	Choe Yun-ok	최윤옥	Not	—	—	—	—	—	—	—	—	—
204	Choe Sung-hui	최성희	Reelected	—	—	—	—	—	—	—	—	—
205	Pak Won-jun	박원준	Not	—	—	—	—	—	—	—	—	—
206	Yi Chong-song	이종송	Not	—	—	—	—	—	—	—	—	—
207	Kim Kil-su	김길수	Not	—	—	—	—	—	—	—	—	—
208	Chon Pok-chin	전복친	Not	—	—	—	—	—	—	—	—	—
209	Kim Yong-yun	김용윤	Not	—	—	—	—	—	—	—	—	—
210	Yi Chong-yol	이종열	Not	—	—	—	—	—	—	—	—	—
211	Yu Hyong-gyu	유형규	Not	—	—	—	—	—	—	—	—	—
212	Yi Sang-in	이상인	Not	—	—	—	—	—	—	—	—	—
213	Ham Se-dok	함세독	Not	—	—	—	—	—	—	—	—	—
214	Yim Chae-yong	임채용	Not	—	—	—	—	—	—	—	—	—
215	Sin Chin-u	신친우	Not	—	—	—	—	—	—	—	—	—
216	Yi Tong-gun	이통군	Not	—	—	—	—	—	—	—	—	—
217	Yi Hong-yon	이홍연	Not	—	—	—	—	—	—	—	—	—
218	Ham To-gyom	햄토겸	Not	—	—	—	—	—	—	—	—	—
219	Kim Tok-hung	김톡흥	Not	—	—	—	—	—	—	—	—	—
220	So Pyong-su	소평수	Not	—	—	—	—	—	—	—	—	—
221	Cho Yong-nae	조용내	Not	—	—	—	—	—	—	—	—	—
222	Kim Hae-jin	김혜진	Reelected	—	—	—	—	—	—	—	—	—
223	Kim Han-il	김한일	Not	—	—	—	—	—	—	—	—	—
224	Yi Chang-gyu	이창규	Not	—	—	—	—	—	—	—	—	—
225	Pak Sang-sun	박상선	Not	—	—	—	—	—	—	—	—	—
226	Kim Tong-il	김통일	Not	—	—	—	—	—	—	—	—	—
227	Kim Mu-sam	김무삼	Not	—	—	—	—	—	—	—	—	—
228	Yi Man-su	이만수	Reelected	—	—	—	—	—	—	—	—	—
229	Won Chon-jun	원천준	Not	—	—	—	—	—	—	—	—	—
230	Ho Sin	신호	Not	—	—	—	—	—	—	—	—	—
231	Yi Tu-san	이투산	Not	—	—	—	—	—	—	—	—	—
232	Yu Yong-yun	유용윤	Not	—	—	—	—	—	—	—	—	—
233	Mun Ok-sun	문옥선	Not	—	—	—	—	—	—	—	—	—
234	Hong Kwang-jun	홍광준	Not	—	—	—	—	—	—	—	—	—
235	Maeng Tu-un	맹투운	Not	—	—	—	—	—	—	—	—	—
236	Yang Po-hyon	양포현	Not	—	—	—	—	—	—	—	—	—
237	O Ki-ok	오기옥	Not	—	—	—	—	—	—	—	—	—
238	O Yong	오용	Not	—	—	—	—	—	—	—	—	CIC–WPSK
239	Yi Chol	이철	Not	—	—	—	—	—	—	—	—	—
240	Yun Sang-man	윤상만	Not	—	—	—	—	—	—	—	—	—
241	Yi Chang-ha	이창하	Not	—	—	—	—	—	—	—	—	—
242	Chon Suk-cha	전석차	Not	—	—	—	—	—	—	—	—	—
243	Kim Wan-gun	김완군	Not	—	—	—	—	—	—	—	—	—
244	Kang Yun-won	강윤원	Not	—	—	—	—	—	—	—	—	—
245	Kwak Chu-sok	곽추석	Not	—	—	—	—	—	—	—	—	—
246	Yi Chun-su	이춘수	Not	—	—	—	—	—	—	—	—	—
247	Chong Yon-tae	종연태	Not	—	—	—	—	—	—	—	—	—
248	Chae Paek-hui	채백희	Not	—	—	—	—	—	—	—	—	—
249	Kim Sun-il	김선일	Not	—	—	—	—	—	—	—	—	—
250	Kim Se-yul	김세율	Reelected	—	—	—	—	—	—	—	—	—
251	Song Wan-sok	송완석	Not	—	—	—	—	—	—	—	—	—
252	Kim Kye-rim	김계림	Not	—	—	WPSK	—	—	Member	—	—	—
253	Kim Hyon-guk	김현국	Not	—	—	—	—	—	—	—	—	—
254	Ko Chun-taek	고춘택	Reelected	—	—	—	—	—	—	—	—	—
255	Yi Pong-nyon	이퐁뇨	Not	—	—	—	—	—	—	—	—	—
256	Chong Se-yol	종세열	Not	—	—	—	—	—	—	—	—	—
257	Cho Pok-nye	조폭예	Not	—	—	—	—	—	—	—	—	—
258	Yi Chae-hyang	이채향	Not	—	—	—	—	—	—	—	—	—
259	Kil Won-pal	길원팔	Not	—	—	—	—	—	—	—	—	—
260	Yi Sun-jo	이순조	Not	—	—	—	—	—	—	—	—	—
261	Mun Tong-yong	문통용	Not	—	—	—	—	—	—	—	—	—
262	Yi Uk	이욱	Not	—	—	—	—	—	—	—	—	—
263	Chong Se-ho	종세호	Not	—	—	—	—	—	—	—	—	—
264	Kim Ho-yong	김호용	Not	—	—	—	—	—	—	—	—	—
265	Kim Han-ung	김한웅	Not	—	—	—	—	—	—	—	—	—
266	Kim Hak-chong	김학총	Not	—	—	—	—	—	—	—	—	—
267	Kwon Pyong-chol	권평철	Not	—	—	—	—	—	—	—	—	—
268	Sol Pyong-ho	솔평호	Not	—	—	—	—	—	—	—	—	—
269	Hong Sung-guk	홍성국	Not	—	—	—	—	—	—	—	—	—
270	Ko Sok-hwan	고석환	Not	—	—	—	—	—	—	—	—	—
271	Kim Su-il	김수일	Not	—	—	—	—	—	—	—	—	—
272	Pak Chong-hyon	박종현	Not	—	—	—	—	—	—	—	—	—
273	Yi Sang-hun	이상훈	Not	—	—	—	—	—	—	—	—	—
274	An Yong-il	안용일	Not	—	—	—	—	—	—	—	—	—
275	Chang Kil-yong	장길용	Not	—	—	—	—	—	—	—	—	—
276	Kim Yu-yong	김유용	Not	—	—	—	—	—	—	—	—	—
277	Hwang Tae-yol	황태열	Not	—	—	—	—	—	—	—	—	—
278	An Sin-ho	안신호	Not	—	—	—	—	—	—	—	—	—
279	Paek Nak-yong	백낙용	Not	—	—	—	—	—	—	—	—	—
280	Chon Yong-pi	전용피	Not	—	—	—	—	—	—	—	—	—
281	Yi Suk-kyong	이석경	Not	—	—	—	—	—	—	—	—	—
282	An Yong-gil	안용길	Not	—	—	—	—	—	—	—	—	—
283	Kim Yong-guk	김용국	Not	—	—	—	—	—	—	—	—	—
284	Kim Sun-nam	김선남	Not	—	—	—	—	—	—	—	—	—
285	Hong Son-u	홍손우	Not	—	—	—	—	—	—	—	—	—
286	Chang Chun	장춘	Not	—	—	—	—	—	—	—	—	—
287	Yi Kyu-hui	이규희	Not	—	—	—	—	—	—	—	—	—
288	Kim Myong-hwan	김명환	Not	—	—	—	—	—	—	—	—	—
289	Hyon Hun	현현	Reelected	—	—	—	—	—	—	—	—	—
290	Choe Sok-sun	최석선	Not	—	—	—	—	—	—	—	—	—
291	Kim Chol-ho	김철호	Not	—	—	—	—	—	—	—	—	—
292	Kim Tae-hong	김태홍	Not	—	—	—	—	—	—	—	—	—
293	Pak Si-yun	박시윤	Not	—	—	—	—	—	—	—	—	—
294	An Si-do	안시도	Not	—	—	—	—	—	—	—	—	—
295	Yi Yong-dok	이용독	Not	—	—	—	—	—	—	—	—	—
296	Kim Si-yop	김시엽	Not	—	—	—	—	—	—	—	—	—
297	Kim Hyong-tae	김형태	Not	—	—	—	—	—	—	—	—	—
298	Yi Chae-yong	이채용	Not	—	—	—	—	—	—	—	—	—
299	Pak Chong-tae	박종태	Not	—	—	—	—	—	—	—	—	—
300	Mun Sang-jik	문상직	Not	—	—	—	—	—	—	—	—	—
301	Kim Tae-ja	김태자	Not	—	—	—	—	—	—	—	—	—
302	Yi Tong-tak	이통탁	Not	—	—	—	—	—	—	—	—	—
303	Yi In-gyu	이인규	Not	—	—	—	—	—	—	—	—	—
304	O Sin-nam	오신남	Not	—	—	—	—	—	—	—	—	—
305	Yi Sok-sung	이석성	Not	—	—	—	—	—	—	—	—	—
306	Choe Kim-bok	최김복	Not	—	—	—	—	—	—	—	—	—
307	Yi Hwan-gi	이환기	Not	—	—	—	—	—	—	—	—	—
308	Cho Chung-gon	조청곤	Not	—	—	—	—	—	—	—	—	—
309	Yi Chin-gun	이진군	Not	—	—	—	—	—	—	—	—	—
310	Yi Chi-chan	이치찬	Not	—	—	—	—	—	Alternate	—	—	—
311	Han Chun-yo	한춘요	Not	—	—	—	—	—	—	—	—	—
312	Pak Chan-hyok	박찬혁	Not	—	—	—	—	—	—	—	—	—
313	Kim Chom-gwon	김첨권	Not	—	—	—	—	—	—	—	—	—
314	Yu Chin-yong	유진용	Not	—	—	—	—	—	—	—	—	—
315	Yi Hae-su	이해수	Not	—	—	—	—	—	—	—	—	—
316	Yi Chong-suk	이종석	Reelected	—	—	—	—	—	—	—	—	—
317	Yim Sang-sun	임상선	Not	—	—	—	—	—	—	—	—	—
318	Yi Chin	이친	Not	—	—	—	—	—	—	—	—	—
319	Song On-pil	송온필	Not	—	—	—	—	—	—	—	—	—
320	Kim Tak	김탁	Not	—	—	—	—	—	—	—	—	—
321	Choe Kwan-yong	최관용	Not	—	—	—	—	—	—	—	—	—
322	Yi Pong-nam	이퐁남	Not	—	—	—	—	—	—	—	—	—
323	Yi Pyong-ho	이평호	Not	—	—	—	—	—	—	—	—	—
324	Pak Chi-hwa	박치화	Not	—	—	—	—	—	—	—	—	—
325	Kim Yu-tae	김유태	Not	—	—	—	—	—	—	—	—	—
326	Yun Sang-yol	윤상열	Not	—	—	—	—	—	—	—	—	—
327	Kim Pyong-je	김평제	Reelected	—	—	—	—	—	—	—	—	—
328	Kim Ui-su	김의수	Not	—	—	—	—	—	—	—	—	—
329	Pak Chol	박철	Not	—	—	—	—	—	—	—	—	—
330	So Chang-sop	소창섭	Not	—	—	—	—	—	—	—	—	—
331	Pak Pok-cho	박폭초	Not	—	—	—	—	—	—	—	—	—
332	Chong Sin-hyon	종신현	Not	—	—	—	—	—	—	—	—	—
333	Choe Son-bi	최선비	Not	—	—	—	—	—	—	—	—	—
334	Mun Ui-sok	문의석	Not	—	—	—	—	—	—	—	—	—
335	Yi Hun	이훈	Not	—	—	—	—	—	—	—	—	—
336	Yun Pyong-gwan	윤평관	Not	—	—	—	—	—	—	—	—	—
337	Kim Nanju-hwa	김난주화	Not	—	—	—	—	—	—	—	—	—
338	Chon Yong-uk	전용욱	Not	—	—	—	—	—	—	—	—	—
339	Cho Tae-u	조태우	Not	—	—	—	—	—	—	—	—	—
340	Pak Sung-gik	박성기	Not	—	—	—	—	—	—	—	—	—
341	Hong Myon-ok	홍면옥	Not	—	—	—	—	—	—	—	—	—
342	Yi Chong-myong	이종명	Not	—	—	—	—	—	—	—	—	—
343	Kim Yong-sop	김용섭	Not	—	—	—	—	—	—	—	—	—
344	An Yong-muk	안용묵	Not	—	—	—	—	—	—	—	—	—
345	Chang Chol	장철	Not	—	—	—	—	—	Member	—	—	Control
346	Mun Hong-gi	문홍기	Not	—	—	—	—	—	—	—	—	—
347	Chong Kil-song	종길송	Not	—	—	—	—	—	—	—	—	—
348	Kim Ki-su	김기수	Not	—	—	—	—	—	—	—	—	—
349	Chu Chang-son	추창손	Not	—	—	—	—	—	—	—	—	—
350	Choe Ki-nam	최기남	Not	—	—	—	—	—	—	—	—	—
351	Cho Kum-song	조금송	Not	—	—	—	—	—	—	—	—	—
352	Kim Chol-su	김철수	Not	—	—	—	—	—	—	—	—	—
353	Yi Pyong-hu	이평후	Not	—	—	—	—	—	—	—	—	—
354	Yi Tu-won	이투원	Not	—	—	—	—	—	—	—	—	—
355	Chong Nam-jo	종남조	Not	—	—	—	—	—	—	—	—	—
356	Pak Chang-gu	박창구	Not	—	—	—	—	—	—	—	—	—
357	O Chol-chu	오철추	Not	—	—	—	—	—	—	—	—	—
358	Kim Pong-son	김퐁손	Not	—	—	—	—	—	—	—	—	—
359	Song Chae-chol	송채철	Not	—	—	—	—	—	—	—	—	—
360	Kwon Yong-ju	권용주	Not	—	—	—	—	—	—	—	—	—
361	Kim Pil-chu	김필추	Not	—	—	—	—	—	—	—	—	—
362	Cha Chi-hun	차치훈	Not	—	—	—	—	—	—	—	—	—
363	Pak Pong-u	박퐁우	Not	—	—	—	—	—	—	—	—	—
364	Chong In-sok	종인석	Not	—	—	—	—	—	—	—	—	—
365	Hyon Sung-gap	현성갑	Not	—	—	—	—	—	—	—	—	—
366	Yi Hi-bong	이히봉	Not	—	—	—	—	—	—	—	—	—
367	Kang In-gol	강인골	Not	—	—	—	—	—	—	—	—	—
368	Pak Pyong-jik	박평직	Not	—	—	—	—	—	—	—	—	—
369	Pak Mun-sun	박문선	Not	—	—	—	—	—	—	—	—	—
370	Ha Yong-suk	하용석	Not	—	—	—	—	—	—	—	—	—
371	Yun Chae-bong	윤채봉	Not	—	—	—	—	—	—	—	—	—
372	Hong Chung-sik	홍정식	Reelected	—	—	—	—	—	—	—	—	—
373	Yi Kun-u	이건우	Not	—	—	—	—	—	—	—	—	—
374	Ko Chol-u	고철우	Not	—	—	—	—	—	—	—	—	—
375	Kil Chin-sop	길친섭	Not	—	—	—	—	—	—	—	—	—
376	Yi Chang-su	이창수	Not	—	—	—	—	—	—	—	—	—
377	Choe Ka-ma	최가마	Not	—	—	—	—	—	—	—	—	—
378	Kim Han-jung	김한정	Not	—	—	—	—	—	Member	—	—	—
379	Yi Po-yol	이포열	Not	—	—	—	—	—	—	—	—	—
380	O Chae-il	오채일	Not	—	—	—	—	—	—	—	—	—
381	Ok Mun-hwan	옥문환	Not	—	—	—	—	—	—	—	—	—
382	Hwang Un-bong	황운봉	Not	—	—	—	—	—	—	—	—	—
383	Kim On	김온	Not	—	—	—	—	—	—	—	—	—
384	Chang Sang-bong	창상봉	Not	—	—	—	—	—	—	—	—	—
385	Kim Tae-song	김태송	Not	—	—	—	—	—	—	—	—	—
386	Min Ki-won	민기원	Not	—	—	—	—	—	—	—	—	—
387	Cho Song-gyu	조송규	Not	—	—	—	—	—	—	—	—	—
388	Kim Chang-nok	김창록	Not	—	—	—	—	—	—	—	—	—
389	Choe Kwang	최광	Reelected	—	—	—	—	—	—	—	—	—
390	Kim Nak-to	김낙토	Not	—	—	—	—	—	—	—	—	—
391	Hong Ki-mun	홍기문	Not	—	—	—	—	—	—	—	—	—
392	Yi Song-jong	이송종	Not	—	—	—	—	—	—	—	—	—
393	Chon Chung-hak	전청학	Not	—	—	—	—	—	—	—	—	—
394	Yi Chin-suk	이진	Not	—	—	—	—	—	—	—	—	—
395	Paek Ung-yop	백웅엽	Not	—	—	—	—	—	—	—	—	—
396	Yun In-yong	윤인용	Not	—	—	—	—	—	—	—	—	—
397	Kim Ui-sun	김의선	Not	—	—	—	—	—	—	—	—	—
398	Yi Min-yong	이민용	Not	—	—	—	—	—	—	—	—	—
399	Chu Chin-hwang	추진황	Not	—	—	—	—	—	—	—	—	—
400	No Myong-hwan	노명환	Not	—	—	—	—	—	—	—	—	—
401	Chang Ki-uk	장기욱	Not	—	—	—	—	—	—	—	—	—
402	Yi Sang-ho	이상호	Not	—	—	—	—	—	—	—	—	—
403	Na Yun-chul	나윤철	Reelected	—	—	—	—	—	—	—	—	—
404	Song Chong-gun	송종군	Not	—	—	—	—	—	—	—	—	—
405	Pak Song-ok	박송옥	Not	—	—	—	—	—	—	—	—	—
406	Pak Kun-mo	박건모	Not	—	—	—	—	—	—	—	—	—
407	Song Tae-jun	송태준	Not	—	—	—	—	—	—	—	—	—
408	Chon Pyong-gi	전평기	Not	—	—	—	—	—	—	—	—	—
409	Kim Pyong-mun	김평문	Not	—	—	—	—	—	—	—	—	—
410	Ma Chong-hwa	마종화	Not	—	—	—	—	—	—	—	—	—
411	Yi Kang-mu	이강무	Not	—	—	—	—	—	—	—	—	—
412	Ho Ha-baek	호하	Not	—	—	—	—	—	—	—	—	—
413	Kim Si-gyom	김시겸	Not	—	—	—	—	—	—	—	—	—
414	Sin Hyon-u	신현우	Not	—	—	—	—	—	—	—	—	—
415	Yi Song-baek	이송백	Not	—	—	—	—	—	—	—	—	—
416	Kim Myong-ni	김명리	Not	—	—	—	—	—	—	—	—	—
417	Yi Yong-jin	이용진	Not	—	—	—	—	—	—	—	—	—
418	Chon Chong-il	전종일	Not	—	—	—	—	—	—	—	—	—
419	Mun Tu-jae	문투재	Not	—	Member	—	—	—	—	—	—	—
420	Kim Yong-hui	김용희	Not	—	—	—	—	—	—	—	—	—
421	Kim Tae-ryon	김태련	Not	—	—	—	—	—	Member	—	—	—
422	Yim Chong-sun	임종선	Not	—	—	—	—	—	—	—	—	—
423	O Ho-sok	오호석	Not	—	—	—	—	—	—	—	—	—
424	Yi Yong-son	이용손	Not	—	—	—	—	—	Alternate	—	—	—
425	Yi Tong-son	이통손	Not	—	—	—	—	—	—	—	—	—
426	Pak Chin-hong	박진홍	Not	—	—	—	—	—	—	—	—	—
427	Yi Chong-gu	이종구	Not	—	—	—	—	—	—	—	—	—
428	Chon Kap-sun	전갑선	Not	—	—	—	—	—	—	—	—	—
429	Ko Chang-nam	고창남	Not	—	—	—	—	—	—	—	—	—
430	Kim Son-cho	김선초	Not	—	—	—	—	—	—	—	—	—
431	Choe Han-chol	최한철	Not	—	—	—	—	—	—	—	—	—
432	Kang Kyu-chan	강규찬	Not	—	—	—	—	—	—	—	—	—
433	Han Yang-ul	한양울	Not	—	—	—	—	—	—	—	—	—
434	Yi Chong-gwon	이종권	Not	—	—	—	—	—	—	—	—	—
435	Han Yong-gyu	한용규	Not	—	—	—	—	—	—	—	—	—
436	Kwon Un-hae	권운해	Not	—	—	—	—	—	—	—	—	—
437	Kang Chol	강철	Not	—	—	—	—	—	—	—	—	—
438	Yi Kwan-sul	이관술	Not	—	—	—	—	—	—	—	—	—
439	Yu Myong-sok	유명석	Not	—	—	—	—	—	—	—	—	—
440	Han Chong-su	한종수	Not	—	—	—	—	—	—	—	—	—
441	Kwon O-jik	권오직	Purged	—	—	—	—	—	—	—	—	—
442	Song Tae-rae	송태래	Not	—	—	—	—	—	—	—	—	—
443	An Ki-song	안기송	Purged	—	—	—	—	—	Member	—	—	—
444	Kim Che-won	김제원	Not	—	—	—	—	—	—	—	—	—
445	Hwang Il-bo	황일보	Not	—	—	—	—	—	—	—	—	—
446	Om Aeng-gwan	옴앵관	Not	—	—	—	—	—	—	—	—	—
447	Yim Tong-uk	임통욱	Not	—	—	—	—	—	—	—	—	—
448	Kim Mun-hwan	김문환	Not	—	—	—	—	—	—	—	—	—
449	Kim Kwang-jun	김광준	Not	—	—	—	—	—	—	—	—	—
450	Cho Yong	조용	Reelected	—	—	—	—	—	Member	—	—	—
451	Yu Sok-kyun	유속균	Not	—	—	—	—	—	—	—	—	—
452	Kang Sin-u	강신우	Not	—	—	—	—	—	—	—	—	—
453	Mun Min-un	문민은	Not	—	—	—	—	—	—	—	—	—
454	Pyon Ki-chang	표기창	Not	—	—	—	—	—	—	—	—	—
455	Choe In	최인	Not	—	—	—	—	—	—	—	—	—
456	Yi Pok-ki	이폭기	Not	—	—	—	—	—	—	—	—	—
457	Ho Chun	천호	Not	—	—	—	—	—	—	—	—	—
458	Ko Chin-hui	고친희	Not	—	—	—	—	—	—	—	—	—
459	Kim Tal-sam	김탈삼	Not	—	—	—	—	—	—	—	—	—
460	Song Song-chol	송송철	Not	—	—	—	—	—	—	—	—	—
461	Yi Myon-hong	이면홍	Not	—	—	—	—	—	—	—	—	—
462	Kim Pyong-ju	김평주	Not	—	—	—	—	—	—	—	—	—
463	Kim Man-jung	김만정	Not	—	—	—	—	—	—	—	—	—
464	Chon Pong-hwa	전봉화	Not	—	—	—	—	—	—	—	—	—
465	Ko Kyong-in	고경인	Reelected	—	—	—	—	—	—	—	—	—
466	An Hui-nam	안휘남	Not	—	—	—	—	—	—	—	—	—
467	Chong Chin-sop	종진섭	Not	—	—	—	—	—	—	—	—	—
468	Kim Ki-taek	김기택	Not	—	—	—	—	—	—	—	—	—
469	Sin Paek-hyon	신백현	Not	—	—	—	—	—	—	—	—	—
470	Yi Sang-gap	이상갑	Not	—	—	—	—	—	—	—	—	—
471	Pak Un-song	박운송	Not	—	—	—	—	—	—	—	—	—
472	Choe San-hwa	최산화	Not	—	—	—	—	—	—	—	—	—
473	Kim Tae-bong	김태봉	Not	—	—	—	—	—	—	—	—	—
474	Choe Suk-yang	최석양	Not	—	—	—	—	—	Member	—	—	—
475	Yu Kim-bong	유김봉	Not	—	—	—	—	—	—	—	—	—
476	Kim To-song	김토송	Not	—	—	—	—	—	—	—	—	—
477	Kim Chong-sun	김종선	Not	—	—	—	—	—	—	—	—	—
478	Kim Ung-yul	김웅율	Not	—	—	—	—	—	—	—	—	—
479	Son Tu-hwan	손투환	Not	—	—	—	—	—	—	—	—	—
480	Son Chong-yol	손종열	Not	—	—	—	—	—	—	—	—	—
481	Kim Yong-ho	김용호	Not	—	—	—	—	—	—	—	—	—
482	Kim Yong-uk	김용욱	Not	—	—	—	—	—	—	—	—	—
483	Cho Won-suk	조원석	Not	—	—	—	—	—	—	—	—	—
484	Kim Chang-han	김창한	Not	—	—	—	—	—	—	—	—	—
485	Yang Won-mo	양원모	Not	—	—	—	—	—	—	—	—	—
486	An Se-hun	안세훈	Not	—	—	—	—	—	—	—	—	—
487	Han Chang-gyo	한창교	Not	—	—	—	—	—	—	—	—	—
488	Han Chang-su	한창수	Not	—	—	—	—	—	—	—	—	—
489	Chu Man-sul	추만술	Not	—	—	—	—	—	—	—	—	—
490	Yim Taek	임택	Reelected	—	—	—	—	—	—	—	—	—
491	Han Chang-ho	한창호	Not	—	—	—	—	—	—	—	—	—
492	Ho Man-ho	호만호	Not	—	—	—	—	—	—	—	—	—
493	Han Kyong-su	한경수	Not	—	—	—	—	—	—	—	—	—
494	Paek Pa	백파	Not	—	—	—	—	—	—	—	—	—
495	Yo Un-chol	요운철	Not	—	—	—	—	—	—	—	—	—
496	Pak Hyong-uk	박형욱	Not	—	—	—	—	—	—	—	—	—
497	Cho U-bang	조우방	Not	—	—	—	—	—	—	—	—	—
498	Chong Chae-son	종채손	Not	—	—	—	—	—	—	—	—	—
499	Yi Pyong-il	이평일	Not	—	—	—	—	—	—	—	—	—
500	Yim Pung-won	임풍원	Not	—	—	—	—	—	—	—	—	—
501	Kang In-gyu	강인규	Not	—	—	—	—	—	—	—	—	—
502	Pak Chun-on	박춘온	Not	—	—	—	—	—	—	—	—	—
503	Yi Pyong-no	이평노	Not	—	—	—	—	—	—	—	—	—
504	Yi Chong-wan	이종완	Not	—	—	—	—	—	—	—	—	—
505	Pak Po-ok	박포옥	Not	—	—	—	—	—	—	—	—	—
506	Kim Po-pae	김포패	Not	—	—	—	—	—	—	—	—	—
507	Yi Ho-je	이호제	Not	—	—	—	—	—	—	—	—	—
508	Pak Pil-hwan	박필환	Not	—	—	—	—	—	—	—	—	—
509	Sin Sun-ye	신선예	Not	—	—	—	—	—	—	—	—	—
510	Yi Ki-hwan	이기환	Not	—	—	—	—	—	—	—	—	—
511	Song Chun-ho	송춘호	Not	—	—	—	—	—	—	—	—	—
512	O Che-hong	오체홍	Not	—	—	—	—	—	—	—	—	—
513	Yu Yong-sang	유용상	Not	—	—	—	—	—	—	—	—	—
514	Kim Un-han	김운한	Not	—	—	—	—	—	—	—	—	—
515	Kim In-bae	김인배	Not	—	—	—	—	—	—	—	—	—
516	Pak Kon-byong	박건병	Not	—	—	—	—	—	—	—	—	—
517	O Ok-byol	오옥별	Not	—	—	—	—	—	—	—	—	—
518	Yi So-un	이소운	Not	—	—	—	—	—	—	—	—	—
519	Yi So-hyang	이소향	Not	—	—	—	—	—	—	—	—	—
520	Kang Song-jae	강송재	Not	—	—	—	—	—	—	—	—	—
521	Yi Chang-bin	이창빈	Not	—	—	—	—	—	—	—	—	—
522	Song Chae-hyon	송채현	Not	—	—	—	—	—	—	—	—	—
523	Cho Pok-ae	조폭애	Not	—	—	—	—	—	—	—	—	—
524	Hyon Po-yol	현포열	Not	—	—	—	—	—	—	—	—	—
525	Chong In-chul	종인철	Not	—	—	—	—	—	—	—	—	—
526	Sin Sun-jik	신선직	Not	—	—	—	—	—	—	—	—	—
527	Kim Chae-yong	김채용	Not	—	—	—	—	—	—	—	—	—
528	O Tae-yong	오태용	Not	—	—	—	—	—	—	—	—	—
529	Choe Wol-song	최월송	Not	—	—	—	—	—	—	—	—	—
530	Kim Ki-nam	김기남	Not	—	—	—	—	—	—	—	—	—
531	Kim Il-son	김일손	Reelected	—	—	—	—	—	—	—	—	—
532	Mun Chi-hwa	문치화	Not	—	—	—	—	—	—	—	—	—
533	Kim Tuk-nan	김득란	Reelected	—	—	—	—	—	—	—	—	—
534	Choe Han-sik	최한식	Not	—	—	—	—	—	—	—	—	—
535	Hong Chol-hi	홍철희	Not	—	—	—	—	—	—	—	—	—
536	Kim Yon-pil	김연필	Not	—	—	—	—	—	—	—	—	—
537	Kim Hyo-won	김효원	Not	—	—	—	—	—	—	—	—	—
538	Kim Yong-won	김용원	Not	—	—	—	—	—	—	—	—	—
539	Kim Chong-ae	김종애	Not	—	—	—	—	—	—	—	—	—
540	Pae Hyong-han	배형한	Not	—	—	—	—	—	—	—	—	—
541	Song Kum-ae	송금애	Not	—	—	—	—	—	—	—	—	—
542	Ko Kwang-han	고광한	Not	—	—	—	—	—	—	—	—	—
543	Yi Suk-yo	이석요	Not	—	—	—	—	—	—	—	—	—
544	Kang Yong-sun	강용선	Not	—	—	—	—	—	—	—	—	—
545	Yi Yong-ju	이용주	Not	—	—	—	—	—	—	—	—	—
546	Ha Pil-won	하필원	Not	—	—	—	—	—	—	—	—	—
547	Hong Chin	홍진	Not	—	—	—	—	—	—	—	—	—
548	Kim Hong-gi	김홍기	Not	—	—	—	—	—	—	—	—	—
549	Kim Chin-ho	김진호	Not	—	—	—	—	—	—	—	—	—
550	Yi Kyong-dong	이경동	Not	—	—	—	—	—	—	—	—	—
551	Kim Sang-sun	김상선	Not	—	—	—	—	—	—	—	—	—
552	Chang Ha-myong	장하명	Not	—	—	—	—	—	—	—	—	—
553	Chon Yun-do	전윤도	Not	—	Member	—	—	—	—	—	—	—
554	Kim Man-su	김만수	Not	—	—	—	—	—	—	—	—	—
555	Chae Ki-ok	채기옥	Not	—	—	—	—	—	—	—	—	—
556	Yi Sok-ha	이속하	Not	—	—	—	—	—	—	—	—	—
557	Kim Song-yul	김송열	Not	—	—	—	—	—	—	—	—	—
558	Sok Tae-ryong	속태룡	Not	—	—	—	—	—	—	—	—	—
559	Sin Sang-dong	신상동	Not	—	—	—	—	—	—	—	—	—
560	Kim Chae-ul	김채울	Not	—	—	—	—	—	—	—	—	—
561	Yun Yong-jun	윤용준	Not	—	—	—	—	—	—	—	—	—
562	Chong Chu-ha	종추하	Not	—	—	—	—	—	—	—	—	—
563	Chon Song-ok	전송옥	Not	—	—	—	—	—	—	—	—	—
564	Yom Ui-hyon	염의현	Not	—	—	—	—	—	—	—	—	—
565	Cho Tong-sok	조통석	Not	—	—	—	—	—	—	—	—	—
566	Kim Op-tol	김옵톨	Not	—	—	—	—	—	—	—	—	—
567	Yun Hui-gu	윤희구	Not	—	—	—	—	—	—	—	—	—
568	Kim Nak-chin	김낙진	Not	—	—	—	—	—	—	—	—	—
569	Pak Chae-sop	박채섭	Not	—	—	—	—	—	—	—	—	—
570	Kim Yong-un	김용은	Not	—	—	—	—	—	—	—	—	—
571	Kwon Tae-bong	권태봉	Not	—	—	—	—	—	—	—	—	—
572	Sin Sang-hun	신상훈	Not	—	—	—	—	—	—	—	—	—
