= Kim Chae-uk =

North Korean politician

- 김채욱

Member of the 2nd WPK Politburo

Personal details
- Occupation: Politician

Kim Chae-uk (Korean: 김채욱) was a North Korean politician who served as a member of the Politburo of the Workers' Party of Korea.

== Biography ==
On 30 August 1946, he was elected a member of the 1st Central Committee of the Workers' Party of Korea. In August 1948, he was elected to the 1st Supreme People's Assembly of North Korea in the 1948 North Korean parliamentary election.

== Bibliography: ==
- So, Chae-jong; Suh, Jae-jung (2013). Origins of North Korea's Juche: Colonialism, War, and Development (1st ed.). Rowman & Littlefield. ISBN 978-0-7391-7658-0.
- Suh, Dae-sook (1981). Korean Communism 1945–1980: A Reference Guide to the Political System (1st ed.). University Press of Hawaii. ISBN 0-8248-0740-5.
