= Central Inspection Commission of the Workers' Party of South Korea =

1946–1949 political organization

The 1st Central Inspection Commission of the Workers' Party of South Korea (WPSK)(남조선로동당 중앙감찰위원회) was elected at the 1st WPSK Congress held in November 1946. It consisted of 11 members and remained active until the merger of WPSK and the Workers' Party of North Korea on 30 June 1949.

== Members ==
Different sources have commonalities, but have differences in listed members.

1. Choe Won-taek as Chairman
2. Kim Hyong-son(김형선) as Vice Chairman
3. Yi Sok-ku(이석구) as Vice Chairman
4. Yun Il-chu(윤일주)
5. Hong Song-u(홍성우)
6. Hong Tok-yu(홍덕유)
7. O Yong(오영)
8. Nam Kyong-hun(남경훈)
9. Han Yong-uk(한영욱)
10. Yi Yong-uk(이영욱)
11. Yi Chong-hwan(이정환)
12. Hong cheung sik(홍증식)
13. Lee yeong je(이영제)
