= 1948 North Korean parliamentary election =

- 25 August 1948

All 572 seats in the Supreme People's Assembly
- Turnout: 99.97%
Party	Seats	+/–
Workers' Party of North Korea	157	
Korean Democratic Party	35	
Chondoist Chongu Party	35	
This lists parties that won seats. See the complete results below.
Premier after
Kim Il Sung; Workers' Party

Parliamentary elections were held in North Korea on 25 August 1948 to elect the members of the 1st Supreme People's Assembly. Organised by the Soviet Civil Administration, the elections saw 572 deputies elected, of which 212 were from North Korea and 360 from South Korea.

These were the first elections to be held after its establishment one month prior.

== Background ==
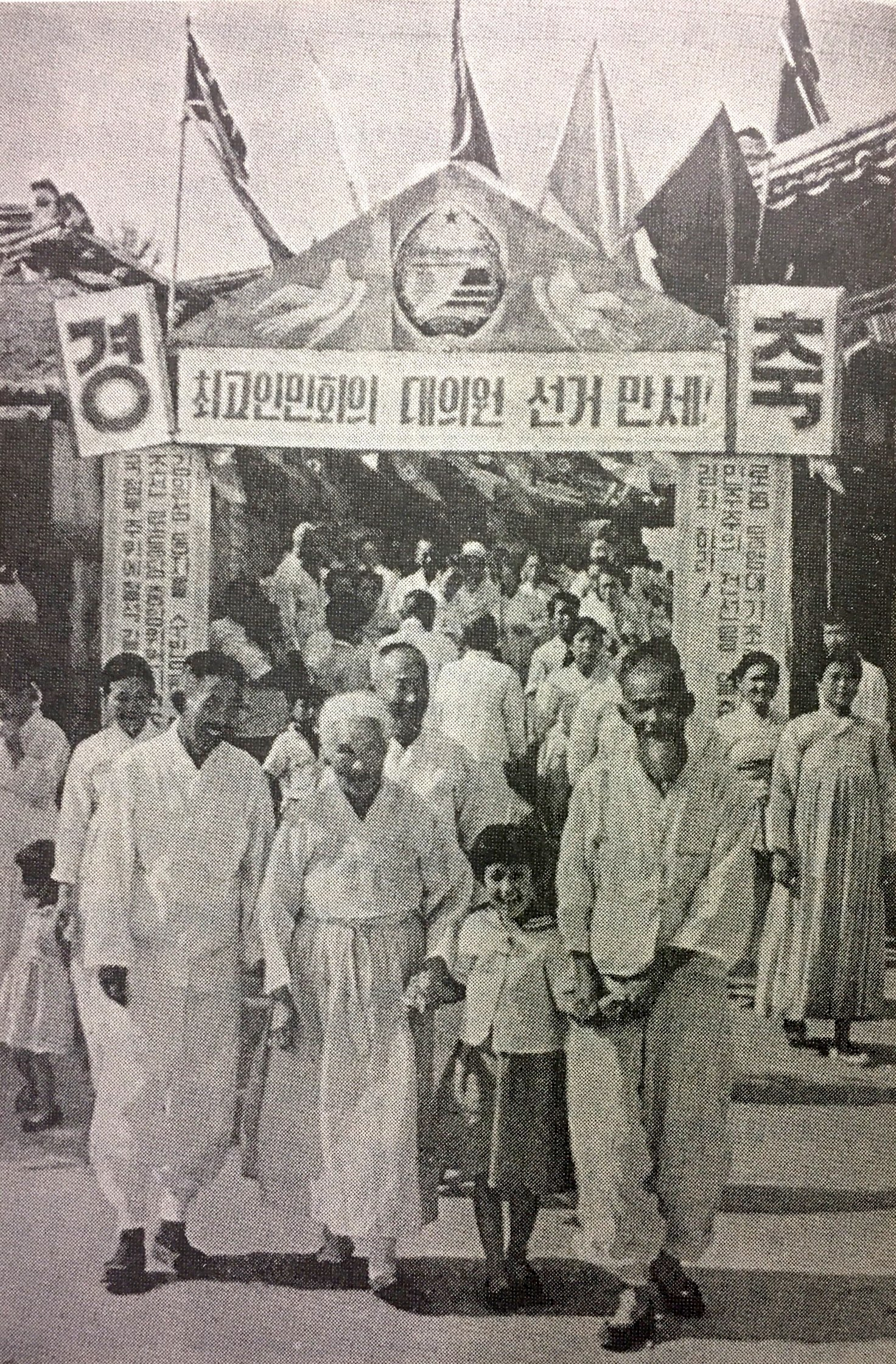
Voters on the way to polling stations

United Nations-sponsored elections for the Constitutional Assembly in US-occupied South Korea were held on 10 May 1948 under supervision of UNTCOK.

Elections in the Soviet-occupied North were announced at the fifth session of the People's Assembly of North Korea on 9 July 1948 as part of the preparations for the establishment of the Democratic People's Republic of Korea. At the second conference of leaders of political parties and social organizations from North and South Korea held from 29 June to 5 July, it was decided that the elections should also be held in South Korea. A decision of the Election Guidance Committee determined that the 360 South Korean deputies would be elected indirectly, with South Korean voters electing people's delegates who would subsequently elect the South Korean deputies.

In North Korea, registration of candidates took place until 5 August 1948, with 228 candidates registered in 212 electoral districts. Among the 228 candidates were 212 candidates nominated by the Democratic Front for the Reunification of Korea and 16 other candidates recommended by voters at meetings. The candidates from the Democratic Front for the Reunification of Korea consisted of 102 candidates from the Workers' Party of North Korea (one of precursor of the WPK), 35 candidates from the Democratic Party, 35 candidates from the Chondoist Chongu Party and 40 independent candidates. There were 34 women among the 228 candidates.

== Results ==
Party or alliance		Seats
Fatherland Front	Workers' Party of North Korea	157
Fatherland Front	Chondoist Chongu Party	35
Fatherland Front	Korean Democratic Party	35
Fatherland Front	Laboring People's Party	20
Fatherland Front	People's Republic Party	20
Fatherland Front	Democratic Independent Party	20
Fatherland Front	Other parties	171
Fatherland Front	Independents	114
Total		572
Source: Nohlen et al., Yonhap News Agency

=== North Korea ===
The North Korean government claimed that 99.97% of eligible voters in North Korea took part in the election. Each district only had one candidate.

Party or alliance		Votes	%	Seats
Fatherland Front	Workers' Party of North Korea	4,456,621	98.49	102
Fatherland Front	Chondoist Chongu Party	4,456,621	98.49	35
Fatherland Front	Korean Democratic Party	4,456,621	98.49	35
Fatherland Front	Independents	4,456,621	98.49	40
Other candidates		68,341	1.51	0
Total		4,524,962	100.00	212
Registered voters/turnout		4,526,065	–	
Source: Korean History Database, Monthly Chosun

=== South Korea ===
The North Korean government claimed that 77.52% of eligible voters in South Korea took part in the underground election of 1,080 people's delegates. The South Korean people's delegates subsequently met on 21–26 August in Northern Haeju, with 1,002 of the 1,080 elected representatives participating. They elected 360 deputies to the Supreme People's Assembly on the basis of one deputy per 50,000 South Koreans.

==== Election of representatives ====
Bloc and party		Votes	%	Seats
Left-wing	Workers' Party of South Korea	6,732,407	100.00	137
Left-wing	National Farmers League	6,732,407	100.00	70
Left-wing	People's Republic Party	6,732,407	100.00	68
Left-wing	Korean Federation of Trade Unions	6,732,407	100.00	66
Left-wing	Democratic Independent Party	6,732,407	100.00	53
Left-wing	Democratic Women's League	6,732,407	100.00	30
Left-wing	League of Cultural Organizations	6,732,407	100.00	24
Left-wing	Democratic Patriotic Youth League	6,732,407	100.00	23
Left-wing	National Confucian League	6,732,407	100.00	18
Left-wing	National Democratic Christian League	6,732,407	100.00	18
Center	Laboring People's Party	6,732,407	100.00	62
Center	Korean Social Democratic Party	6,732,407	100.00	43
Center	Democratic Korean Independence Party	6,732,407	100.00	35
Center	New Progressive Party	6,732,407	100.00	31
Center	National Independence Federation	6,732,407	100.00	30
Center	People's Alliance	6,732,407	100.00	20
Right-wing	Industrious Masses Party	6,732,407	100.00	19
Right-wing	Chondoist Chongu Party	6,732,407	100.00	7
Right-wing	Healthy People's Society	6,732,407	100.00	7
Right-wing	Korean Independence Party	6,732,407	100.00	7
Right-wing	National Buddhist Federation	6,732,407	100.00	7
Right-wing	Buddhist Youth Association	6,732,407	100.00	6
Right-wing	Korean Farmers Party	6,732,407	100.00	6
Right-wing	National Assembly of Village Representatives	6,732,407	100.00	6
Right-wing	National Youth Association	6,732,407	100.00	6
Right-wing	Patriotic Youth Association	6,732,407	100.00	6
Right-wing	Federation of Objectors to Student Conscription	6,732,407	100.00	4
Right-wing	Democratic Independent Women's League	6,732,407	100.00	2
Independents		6,732,407	100.00	269
Total		6,732,407	100.00	1,080
Total votes		6,732,407	–	
Registered voters/turnout		8,681,746	77.55	
Source: Korean History Database, The Academy of Korean Studies

==== Election of South Korean deputies ====
Party	Votes	%	Seats
Fatherland Front			360
Total			360
Total votes	1,002	–	
Registered voters/turnout	1,080	92.78	
Source: Korean History Database

== Elected members ==
The following were elected as members of parliament:

1. Kim Il Sung
2. Kim Tu-bong
3. Ho Hon
4. Kim Tal-hyon
5. Ri Yong
6. Hong Nam-pyo
7. Hong Ki-ju
8. Pak Hon-yong
9. Hong Myong-hui
10. Kim Chaek
11. Kang Ryang-uk
12. Kang Sun
13. Kang Chin-gon
14. Ku Chae-su
15. Kim Pyong-je
16. Kim Chang-jun
17. Na Sung-gyu
18. Yu Yong-jun
19. Yi Ku-hun
20. Ri Ki-yong
21. Yi Nung-jong
22. Pak Yun-gil
23. Pak Chong-ae
24. Song Chu-sik
25. Chang Kwon
26. Chang Sun-myong
27. Cho Un
28. Choe Kyong-dok
29. Jong Jun-thaek
30. Choe Yong-gon
31. Kim Won-bong
32. Pak Il-u
33. Pak Mun-gyu
34. Chang Si-u
35. Chu Yong-ha
36. Choe Chang-ik
37. Paek Nam-un
38. Kim Jong-ju
39. Yi Suing-yop
40. Ho Jong-suk
41. Ho Song-taek
42. Yi Pyong-nam
43. Yi Yong
44. Yi Kuk-no
45. Chang Hae-u
46. No Chin-han
47. Kim Il
48. Pak Hun-il
49. Ho Ka-i
50. Pak Chang-sik
51. Kim O-song
52. Ko Hui-man
53. Pang Hak-se
54. Kang Kon
55. Kang Ung-jin
56. Yi Man-gyu
57. Kim Sam-yong
58. Pak Se-yong
59. Kim Song-gyu
60. Yun Haeng-jung
61. Kang Mun-sok
62. Song Ul-su
63. Kim Sang-hyok
64. Yi Tong-hwa
65. Han Hyo-sam
66. Jong Il-ryong
67. Yun Hyong-sik
68. Yi Ki-sok
69. Song Pong-uk
70. Kim Ung-gi
71. Kim Chae-uk
72. Hong Ki-hwang
73. Yi Sok-bo
74. Kim Yong-su
75. Nam Il
76. Yi Pyong-je
77. Yi Yo-song
78. Tak Chang-hyok
79. Cho Yong-se
80. Yi Sang-jun
81. Kim Ki-do
82. Kim Kwang-su
83. Choe Ik-han
84. Yu Hae-bung
85. Choe Chun-yong
86. Kim Yol
87. Yi Hong-yol
88. Kim Chan
89. Yun Chung-u
90. Choe Won-tack
91. Chong Song-on
92. YiSik
93. Kim Hwang-il
94. Kim Ki-ju
95. Yi Chong-man
96. Pak Yong-song
97. Ri Yu-min
98. Pak Chang-ok
99. Yi Yong-jun
100. Yi In-dong
101. Cho Chung-gwang
102. Yu Ki-sop
103. Yi Chom-sun
104. Chong No-sik
105. Han Sang-muk
106. Kim Yong-jae
107. Kim Yong-dam
108. O Chae-yong
109. Kim Ok-bin
110. Choe Pong-su
111. Hwang Tae-song
112. Han Il-su
113. Kim Yong-wan
114. Tae Song-su
115. Yi Chu-yon
116. Kim Sang-chol
117. Pak Sang-jun
118. Kim Min-san
119. Kim Yun-gol
120. Chon Chan-bae
121. Cho Hi-yong
122. U Pong-un
123. Yi Tae-song
124. Hwang Uk
125. YiChu-ha
126. Chong Paek
127. No Sok-kwi
128. So Kap-sun
129. Cho Pom-gu
130. Han Sorya
131. Chu Hwang-sop
132. Han Il-mu
133. Pak Chi-ho
134. Kim Chung-gyu
135. Yi Mun-hwan
136. Ok Yong-ja
137. Hong Myon-hu
138. Kim Son-gil
139. Ham Ik-nok
140. Kim Won-hyong
141. Pak Il-yong
142. Kim Song-ok
143. Kim Nam-chon
144. Won Ho-sun
145. Song Myong-hon
146. Choe Son-gyu
147. Pak Chun-yong
148. Song Kyu-hwan
149. Yi Won-il
150. Chong Tae-sok
151. Chae Chun-sok
152. Yi Yong-som
153. Kim Su-hyon
154. Won Man-su
155. Chong Chol
156. Kim Il-chong
157. Kim Sung-hyon
158. Kim Hyong-gon
159. Kim Myong-sok
160. Kim Song-hak
161. Chong Un-yong
162. Pak Yong-han
163. Yi Kang-guk
164. O Ki-sop
165. Kim Hae-chon
166. Yi Sang-sun
167. Kim Sang-ju
168. Chu Hae
169. Yun Su
170. Yi Hyok-yong
171. Pak Ki-ho
172. Sin Nam-chol
173. Chong Chu-gyong
174. Yi Sul-chin
175. Sin Yong-bok
176. Choe Yong-dal
177. Kim Sung-mo
178. Chong Chong-sik
179. Cho Chae-han
180. Kim Chae-rok
181. Yi Tong-yong
182. Won Hong-gu
183. Kim Paek-tong
184. Ho Nam-hu
185. Paek Pong-son
186. Choe Ung-yo
187. Yi Son-jae
188. Yom Chong-gwon
189. Yu Tong-yol
190. Chang U-uk
191. Choe Song-hwan
192. Yang Hong-ju
193. Yi Chil-song
194. Son Tong-gi
195. Paek Pyong-ik
196. Yi Chae-yong
197. Choe Son-ja
198. Kang Chun-sam
199. Min Hyok-cho
200. Chong Chil-song
201. Kye Tong-son
202. Kim Ho-sun
203. Choe Yun-ok
204. Choe Sung-hui
205. Pak Won-jun
206. Yi Chong-song
207. Kim Kil-su
208. Chon Pok-chin
209. Kim Yong-yun
210. Yi Chong-yol
211. Yu Hyong-gyu
212. Yi Sang-in
213. Ham Se-dok
214. Yim Chae-yong
215. Sin Chin-u
216. Yi Tong-gun
217. Yi Hong-yon
218. Ham To-gyom
219. Kim Tok-hung
220. So Pyong-su
221. Cho Yong-nae
222. Kim Hae-jin
223. Kim Han-il
224. Yi Chang-gyu
225. Pak Sang-sun
226. Kim Tong-il
227. Kim Mu-sam
228. Yi Man-su
229. Won Chon-jun
230. Ho Sin
231. Yi Tu-san
232. Yu Yong-yun
233. Mun Ok-sun
234. Hong Kwang-jun
235. Maeng Tu-un
236. Yang Po-hyon
237. O Ki-ok
238. O Yong
239. Yi Chol
240. Yun Sang-man
241. Yi Chang-ha
242. Chon Suk-cha
243. Kim Wan-gun
244. Kang Yun-won
245. Kwak Chu-sok
246. Yi Chun-su
247. Chong Yon-tae
248. Chae Paek-hui
249. Kim Sun-il
250. Kim Se-yul
251. Song Wan-sok
252. Kim Kye-rim
253. Kim Hyon-guk
254. Ko Chun-taek
255. Yi Pong-nyon
256. Chong Se-yol
257. Cho Pok-nye
258. Yi Chae-hyang
259. Kil Won-pal
260. Yi Sun-jo
261. Mun Tong-yong
262. Yi Uk
263. Chong Se-ho
264. Kim Ho-yong
265. Kim Han-ung
266. Kim Hak-chong
267. Kwon Pyong-chol
268. Svl Pysng-ho
269. Hong Sung-guk
270. Ko Sok-hwan
271. Kim Su-il
272. Pak Chong-hyon
273. Yi Sang-hun
274. An Yong-il
275. Chang Kil-yong
276. Kim Yu-yong
277. Hwang Tae-yol
278. An Sin-ho
279. Paek Nak-yong
280. Chon Yong-pi
281. YiSuk-kyong
282. An Yong gil
283. Kim Yong-guk
284. Kim Sun-nam
285. Hong Son-u
286. Chang Chun
287. Yi Kyu-hui
288. Kim Myong-hwan
289. Hyon Hun
290. Choe Sok-sun
291. Kim Chol-ho
292. Kim Tae-hong
293. Pak Si-yun
294. An Si-do
295. Yi Yong-dok
296. Kim Si-yop
297. Kim Hyong-tae
298. Yi Chae-yong
299. Pak Chong-tae
300. Mun Sang-jik
301. Kim Tae-ja
302. Yi Tong-tak
303. Yi In-gyu
304. O Sin-nam
305. Yi Sok-sung
306. Choe Kim-bok
307. Yi Hwan-gi
308. Cho Chung-gon
309. Yi Chin-gun
310. Yi Chi-chan
311. Han Chun-yo
312. Pak Chan-hyok
313. Kim Chom-gwon
314. Yu Chin-yong
315. Yi Hae-su
316. Yi Chong-suk
317. Yim Sang-sun
318. Yi Chin
319. Song On-pil
320. Kim Tak
321. Choe Kwan-yong
322. Yi Pong-nam
323. Yi Pyong-ho
324. Pak Chi-hwa
325. Kim Yu-tae
326. Yun Sang-yol
327. Kim Pyong-je
328. Kim Ui-su
329. Pak Chal
330. So Chang-sop
331. Pak Pok-cho
332. Chong Sin-hyon
333. Choe Son-bi
334. Mun Ui-sok
335. Yi Hun
336. Yun Pyong-gwan
337. Kim Nanju-hwa
338. Chon Yong-uk
339. Cho Tae-u
340. Pak Sung-gik
341. Hong Myon-ok
342. Yi Chong-myong
343. Kim Yong-sop
344. An Yong-muk
345. Chang Chol
346. Mun Hong-gi
347. Chong Kil-song
348. Kim Ki-su
349. Chu Chang-son
350. Choe Ki-nam
351. Cho Kum-song
352. Kim Chol-su
353. Yi Pyong-hu
354. Yi Tu-won
355. Chong Nam-jo
356. Pak Chang-gu
357. O Chol-chu
358. Kim Pong-son
359. Song Chae-chol
360. Kwon Yong-ju
361. Kim Pil-chu
362. Cha Chi-hun
363. Pak Pong-u
364. Chong In-sok
365. Hyon Sung-gap
366. Yi Hi-bong
367. Kang In-gol
368. Pak Pyong-jik
369. Pak Mun-sun
370. Ha Yong-suk
371. Yun Chae-bong
372. Hong Chung-sik
373. Yi Kun-u
374. Ko Chol-u
375. Kil Chin-sop
376. Yi Chang-su
377. Choe Ka-ma
378. Kim Han-jung
379. Yi Po-yol
380. O Chae-il
381. Ok Mun-hwan
382. Hwang Un-bong
383. Kim On
384. Chang Sang-bong
385. Kim Tae-song
386. Min Ki-won
387. Cho Song-gyu
388. Kim Chang-nok
389. Choe Kwang
390. Kim Nak-to
391. Hong Ki-mun
392. Yi Song-jong
393. Chon Chung-hak
394. Yi Chin-suk
395. Paek Ung-yop
396. Yun In-yong
397. Kim Ui-sun
398. Yi Min-yong
399. Chu Chin-hwang
400. No Myong-hwan
401. Chang Ki-uk
402. Yi Sang-ho
403. Na Yun-chul
404. Song Chong-gun
405. Pak Song-ok
406. Pak Kun-mo
407. Song Tae-jun
408. Chon Pyong-gi
409. Kim Pyong-mun
410. Ma Chong-hwa
411. Yi Kang-mu
412. Ho Ha-baek
413. Kim Si-gyom
414. Sin Hyon-u
415. Yi Song-baek
416. Kim Myong-ni
417. Yi Yong-jin
418. Chon Chong-il
419. Mun Tu-jae
420. Kim Yong-hui
421. Kim Tae-ryon
422. Yim Chong-sun
423. O Ho-sok
424. Yi Yong-son
425. Yi Tong-son
426. Pak Chin-hong
427. Yi Chong-gu
428. Chon Kap-sun
429. Ko Chang-nam
430. Kim Son-cho
431. Choe Han-chol
432. Kang Kyu-chan
433. Han Yang-ul
434. Yi Chong-gwon
435. Han Yong-gyu
436. Kwon Un-hae
437. Kang Chol
438. Yi Kwan-sul
439. Yu Myong-sok
440. Han Chong-su
441. Kwon O-jik
442. Song Tae-rae
443. An Ki-song
444. Kim Che-won
445. Hwang Il-bo
446. Om Aeng-gwan
447. Yim Tong-uk
448. Kim Mun-hwan
449. Kim Kwang-jun
450. Cho Yong
451. Yu Sok-kyun
452. Kang Sin-u
453. Mun Min-un
454. Pyon Ki-chang
455. Choe In
456. Yi Pok-ki
457. Ho Chun
458. Ko Chin-hui
459. Kim Tal-sam
460. Song Song-chol
461. Yi Myon-hong
462. Kim Pyong-ju
463. Kim Man-jung
464. Chon Pong-hwa
465. Ko Kyong-in
466. An Hai-nam
467. Chong Chin-sop
468. Kim Ki-taek
469. Sin Paek-hyon
470. Yi Sang-gap
471. Pak Un-song
472. Choe San-hwa
473. Kim Tae-bong
474. Choe Suk-yang
475. Yu Kim-bong
476. Kim To-song
477. Kim Chong-sun
478. Kim Ung-yul
479. Son Tu-hwan
480. Son Chong-yol
481. Kim Yong-ho
482. Kim Yong-uk
483. Cho Won-suk
484. Kim Chang-han
485. Yang Won-mo
486. An Se-hun
487. Han Chang-gyo
488. Han Chang-su
489. Chu Man-sul
490. Yim Taek
491. Han Chang-ho
492. Ho Man-ho
493. Han Kyong-su
494. Paek Pa
495. Yo Un-chol
496. Pak Hyong-uk
497. Cho U-bang
498. Chong Chae-son
499. Yi Pyong-il
500. Yim Pung-won
501. Kang In-gyu
502. Pak Chun-on
503. Yi Pyong-no
504. Yi Chong-wan
505. Pak Po-ok
506. Kim Po-pae
507. Yi Ho-je
508. Pak Pil-hwan
509. Sin Sun-ye
510. Yi Ki-hwan
511. Song Chun-ho
512. O Che-hong
513. Yu Yong-sang
514. Kim Un-han
515. Kim In-bae
516. Pak Kon-byong
517. O Ok-byol
518. Yi So-un
519. Yi So-hyang
520. Kang Song-jae
521. Yi Chang-bin
522. Song Chae-hyon
523. Cho Pok-ae
524. Hyon Po-yol
525. Chong In-chul
526. Sin Sun-jik
527. Kim Chae-yong
528. O Tae-yong
529. Choe Wol-song
530. Kim Ki-nam
531. Kim Il-son
532. Mun Chi-hwa
533. Kim Tuk-nan
534. Choe Han-sik
535. Hong Chol-hi
536. Kim Yon-pil
537. Kim Hyo-won
538. Kim Yong-won
539. Kim Chong-ae
540. Pae Hyong-han
541. Song Kum-ae
542. Ko Kwang-han
543. Yi Suk-yo
544. Kang Yong-sun
545. Yi Yong-ju
546. Ha Pil-won
547. Hong Chin
548. Kim Hong-gi
549. Kim Chin-ho
550. Yi Kyong-dong
551. Kim Sang-sun
552. Chang Ha-myong
553. Chon Yun-do
554. Kim Man-su
555. Chae Ki-ok
556. Yi Sok-ha
557. Kim Song-yul
558. Sok Tae-ryong
559. Sin Sang-dong
560. Kim Chae-ul
561. Yun Yong-jun
562. Chong Chu-ha
563. Chon Song-ok
564. Yom Ui-hyon
565. Cho Tong-sok
566. Kim Op-tol
567. Yun Hui-gu
568. Kim Nak-chin
569. Pak Chae-sop
570. Kim Yong-un
571. Kwon Tae-bong
572. Sin Sang-hun
