= Pak Yong-son =

North Korean politician

- 박용손

Member of the 2nd WPK Politburo
- In office 1948–1949

Member of the Supreme People's Assembly 1st term
- In office 2 September 1948 – 18 September 1957

Personal details
- Occupation: Politician

Pak Yong-son (Korean: 박용손) was a North Korean politician. He was a member of the Workers' Party of Korea and elected to its 2nd Central Committee. In addition he was elected to the 2nd Standing Committee in the immediate aftermath of the 2nd WPK Congress on 30 March 1948. In August 1948 he was elected to the 1st Supreme People's Assembly of North Korea in the 1948 North Korean parliamentary election.

== Biography ==
Books:

- So, Chae-jong; Suh, Jae-jung (2013). Origins of North Korea's Juche: Colonialism, War, and Development (1st ed.). Rowman & Littlefield. ISBN 978-0-7391-7658-0.
- Suh, Dae-sook (1981). Korean Communism 1945–1980: A Reference Guide to the Political System (1st ed.). University Press of Hawaii. ISBN 0-8248-0740-5.

Dissertations:

- Paik, Hak Soon (1993). North Korean State Formation, 1945–1950 (Thesis). University of Pennsylvania. Archived from the original on March 28, 2022.
