= Chairman of the Supreme People's Assembly =

Presiding officer of the Legislature of North Korea

- 최고인민회의 의장
- Emblem of North Korea

- Flag of North Korea
- Incumbent; Vacant since 20 June 2026
- Appointer: Supreme People's Assembly President of the State Affairs Commission (when the SPA is not in session)
- Term length: Same as the term of the Supreme People's Assembly
- Inaugural holder: Ho Hon
- Formation: 8 September 1948; 78 years ago

- Chairman of the Supreme People's Assembly
- Hangul: 최고인민회의 의장
- RR: Choego inmin hoeui uijang
- MR: Ch'oego inmin hoeŭi ŭijang

The chairman of the Supreme People's Assembly is the presiding officer of the Supreme People's Assembly, the supreme state organ of power of North Korea. The chairman also concurrently serves as the chairman of the Standing Committee of the Supreme People's Assembly.

The Supreme People's Assembly elects a chairman to preside its sessions. Vice chairmen are elected alongside the chairman. The president of the State Affairs Commission has the powers to suspend the duties of, appoint, or dismiss the premier during the recess of the Supreme People's Assembly.

From 1972 until 1998 and since 2026, the chairman of the Supreme People's Assembly has been ex officio the chairman of the Standing Committee of the Supreme People's Assembly.

The position is vacant since 20 June 2026.

== List of office holders ==
No.	Portrait	Name (Birth–Death)	Term of office			Party	SPA
No.	Portrait	Name (Birth–Death)	Took office	Left office	Time in office	Party	SPA
1		Ho Hon 허헌 (1885–1951)	8 September 1948	17 August 1951	2 years, 343 days	Workers' Party of North Korea (until 1949)	1st
1		Ho Hon 허헌 (1885–1951)	8 September 1948	17 August 1951	2 years, 343 days	Workers' Party of Korea (from 1949)	1st
Vacant (17 August 1951 – 22 December 1953)							1st
2		Ri Yong 리영 (1889–1960)	22 December 1953	20 September 1957	3 years, 272 days	Laboring People's Party	1st
3		Choe Won-taek 최원택 (1895–1973)	20 September 1957	16 December 1967	10 years, 87 days	Workers' Party of Korea	2nd
3		Choe Won-taek 최원택 (1895–1973)	20 September 1957	16 December 1967	10 years, 87 days	Workers' Party of Korea	3rd
4		Paek Nam-un 백남운 (1894–1976)	16 December 1967	28 December 1972	5 years, 12 days	Workers' Party of Korea	4th
5		Hwang Jang-yop 황장엽 (1923–2010)	28 December 1972	7 April 1983	10 years, 100 days	Workers' Party of Korea	5th
5		Hwang Jang-yop 황장엽 (1923–2010)	28 December 1972	7 April 1983	10 years, 100 days	Workers' Party of Korea	6th
5		Hwang Jang-yop 황장엽 (1923–2010)	28 December 1972	7 April 1983	10 years, 100 days	Workers' Party of Korea	7th
6		Yang Hyong-sop 양형섭 (1925–2022)	7 April 1983	5 September 1998	15 years, 151 days	Workers' Party of Korea	7th
6		Yang Hyong-sop 양형섭 (1925–2022)	7 April 1983	5 September 1998	15 years, 151 days	Workers' Party of Korea	8th
6		Yang Hyong-sop 양형섭 (1925–2022)	7 April 1983	5 September 1998	15 years, 151 days	Workers' Party of Korea	9th
7		Choe Thae-bok 최태복 (1930–2024)	5 September 1998	11 April 2019	20 years, 218 days	Workers' Party of Korea	10th
7		Choe Thae-bok 최태복 (1930–2024)	5 September 1998	11 April 2019	20 years, 218 days	Workers' Party of Korea	11th
7		Choe Thae-bok 최태복 (1930–2024)	5 September 1998	11 April 2019	20 years, 218 days	Workers' Party of Korea	12th
7		Choe Thae-bok 최태복 (1930–2024)	5 September 1998	11 April 2019	20 years, 218 days	Workers' Party of Korea	13th
8		Pak Thae-song 박태성 (born 1955)	11 April 2019	17 January 2023	3 years, 281 days	Workers' Party of Korea	14th
9		Pak In-chol 박인철	17 January 2023	20 September 2025	2 years, 246 days	Workers' Party of Korea	14th
Vacant (20 September 2025 – 22 March 2026)							14th
10		Jo Yong-won 조용원 (born 1957)	22 March 2026	20 June 2026	90 days	Workers' Party of Korea	15th
Vacant (since 20 June 2026)							15th
