= Hong Ki-ju =

North Korean politician (1893–1960)

Standing Committee Vice Chairman of the Supreme People's Assembly
- In office 22 December 1953 – 20 September 1957

Personal details
- Born: 1893 Joseon
- Died: 1960 (aged 66–67) Pyongyang, North Korea
- Citizenship: North Korea
- Party: Korean Social Democratic Party

Korean name
- Hangul: 홍기주
- Hanja: 洪箕疇
- RR: Hong Giju
- MR: Hong Kiju

Hong Ki-ju (Korean: 홍기주; 1893–1960) was a North Korean independence activist and politician who served as a member of the Supreme People's Assembly, North Korea's unicameral parliament.

== Biography ==
Hong Ki-ju was a Methodist pastor who was in charge of Shinmak Church in Sohung County, Hwanghae Province. He was a member of the Korean Social Democratic Party. In February 1946 he joined the Provisional People's Committee of North Korea. and in 1947 he became vice chairman of the People's Committee of North Korea. In the 1948 North Korean parliamentary election he was elected a member of the 1st Supreme People's Assembly of North Korea and following the formal declaration of independence of North Korea, he served as Vice Chairman of the Standing Committee of the 1st Supreme People's Assembly of North Korea. From December 1953 to July 1957 he served as the 3rd Minister of Justice in the 1st Cabinet of North Korea succeeding Ho Jong-suk. He was purged together with his brother in 1960.
