= People's Committee of North Korea =

1947–1948 provisional government

People's Committee of North Korea 북조선인민위원회
- 1947–1948
- Flag
- Anthem: Aegukga 애국가 "Patriotic Song"
- Government Seal

- Location of northern Korea
- Status: Provisional government under Soviet Civil Administration
- Capital: Pyongyang
- Common languages: Korean
- Religion: State atheism
- Government: Provisional communist state
- Chairman
  - 1947–1948: Kim Il Sung
- Legislature: People's Assembly
- Historical era: Cold War
  - Established: 22 February 1947
  - Democratic People's Republic of Korea proclaimed: 9 September 1948
- Currency: Korean yen (1947); Won of the Red Army Command (1947); North Korean won (1947–1948)
Preceded by	Succeeded by
Provisional People's Committee of North Korea	Democratic People's Republic of Korea
- ^aSee Religion in North Korea.

- People's Committee of North Korea
- Hangul: 북조선인민위원회
- Hanja: 北朝鮮人民委員會
- RR: Bukjoseon inmin wiwonhoe
- MR: Pukchosŏn inmin wiwŏnhoe

The People's Committee of North Korea (Korean: 북조선인민위원회) was a provisional government governing the Northern portion of the Korean Peninsula from 1947 until 1948.

Established on 21 February 1947 as the successor of the de facto provisional government of the Provisional People's Committee of North Korea, the provisional government was pro-Soviet and ideologically communist. It functioned alongside the Soviet Civil Administration, which served in an advisory role to the provisional government. The committee oversaw the transition from Soviet occupation in northern Korea to the Democratic People’s Republic of Korea, which was established on 9 September 1948.

== Organization ==
The People's Committee of North Korea was organized during the first session of the People's Assembly of North Korea held on 21–22 February 1947. The session decided to transfer the power of the Provisional People's Committee of North Korea to the People's Committee of North Korea, and elected Kim Il Sung as its chairman based on the proposal of the Democratic National United Front head Choe Yong-gon.

The People's Assembly gave authorization to Kim Il Sung to organize the People's Committee.

Position	Name	Affiliation
Chairman	Kim Il Sung	Workers' Party of North Korea
Vice Chairmen	Kim Chaek	Workers' Party of North Korea
Vice Chairmen	Hong Ki-ju	Democratic Party
Secretary General	Han Pyong-ok	Workers' Party of North Korea
Planning Department	Jong Jun-taek	Workers' Party of North Korea
Industry Department	Ri Mun-hwan	Independent
Internal Affairs Department	Pak Il-u	Workers' Party of North Korea
Foreign Affairs Department	Ri Kang-guk	Workers' Party of South Korea
Finance Department	Ri Pong-su	Workers' Party of North Korea
Transportation Department	Ho Nam-hui	Independent
Agriculture and Forestry Department	Ri Sun-gun	Workers' Party of North Korea
Postal Service Department	Ju Hwang-sop	Chondoist Chongu Party
Commerce Department	Jang Si-u	Workers' Party of North Korea
Health Department	Ri Tong-yong	Democratic Party
Education Department	Han Sol-ya	Workers' Party of North Korea
Labor Department	O Ki-sop	Workers' Party of North Korea
Justice Department	Choe Yong-dal	Workers' Party of North Korea
Public Censorship Department	Choe Chang-ik	Workers' Party of North Korea
Executive Bureau	Jang Jong-sik	Workers' Party of North Korea
Propaganda Bureau	Ho Jong-suk	Workers' Party of North Korea
Food Policy Bureau	Song Pong-uk	Workers' Party of North Korea
General Affairs Bureau	Kim Jong-ju	Chondoist Chongu Party

== Dissolution ==
The Democratic People's Republic of Korea was proclaimed on July 10, 1948, effectively dissolving the provisional government. Kim Il Sung was appointed as premier on September 9. Soviet forces withdrew from North Korea in December 1948.

== See also ==
- Soviet occupation of northern Korea
- Provisional Government of the Republic of Korea
- United States Army Military Government in Korea
- People's Republic of Korea
- Government of North Korea
