= Ho Hon =

Korean politician (1885–1951)

- 허헌
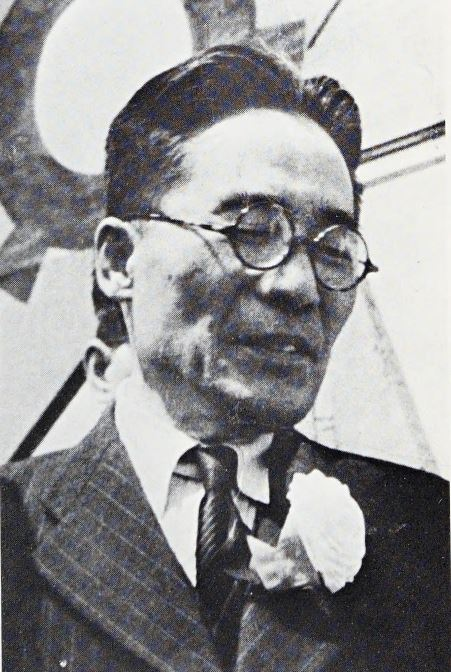

Chairman of the Supreme People's Assembly
- In office 10 September 1948 – 16 August 1951
- Vice Chairman: Kim Tal-hyon; Yi Yong
- Premier: Kim Il Sung
- Preceded by: Office established
- Succeeded by: Yi Yong

Chairman of the Workers' Party of South Korea

1st term
- In office 24 November 1946 – 24 June 1949
- Vice Chairman: 2 served: Pak Hon-yong; Yi Ki-sok
- Preceded by: Office established
- Succeeded by: Office dissolved

Prime Minister of the People's Republic of Korea
- In office 6 September – 12 December 1945
- Preceded by: Office established
- Succeeded by: Office abolished

Personal details
- Born: 22 July 1885 Korean Empire
- Died: 16 August 1951 (aged 66) Chongchon River, North Korea
- Resting place: Patriotic Martyrs' Cemetery
- Citizenship: North Korean
- Party: Workers' Party of Korea (from 1949)
- Other political affiliations: Workers' Party of South Korea (1946–1949); Communist Party of Korea
- Children: Ho Jong-suk
- Education: Hansung Middle School
- Alma mater: Bosung College; Meiji University

Korean name
- Hangul: 허헌
- Hanja: 許憲
- RR: Heo Heon
- MR: Hŏ Hŏn

Ho Hon (Korean: 허헌; 22 July 1885 – 16 August 1951) was a Korean independence activist and politician of the Japanese colonial period and early years of North Korea. As a lawyer, he defended independence activists along with Lee In and Kim Byong-ro. In September 1948, following the official proclamation on the establishment of North Korea in the northern part of the Korean peninsula, he was elected a delegate to the first convocation of the Supreme People's Assembly, the unicameral parliament of North Korea. He also served as the President of Kim Il Sung University. While working as a reunification activist, he drowned in the Chongchon River in August 1951. He was also the father of Ho Jong-suk, a female activist and a politician in North Korea.

== Biography ==
After the liberation, in August 1945, he participated in the founding of the National Committee for Preparation of Republic of Korea with Pak Hon-yong and Lyuh Woon-hyung, and was elected to the prime minister of the People's Republic of Korea through the Vice Chairman of the committee. After its dismantling, he was oppressed while acting as a Democratic People's Front and Namjo Line Workers' Party in South Korea.

=== Early life ===
Heo Heon was born in 1885 in Hapyeong-ri, Hawoo-myeon, Myongchon County, North Hamgyong Province, as the son of Hyangban. When he was 10 years old in 1895, he followed his father to Hanseongbu and lived in a house near Gwanghwamun. Then, he entered the newly established Korean Residents' Elementary School, and in 1899 he went to Hansung Middle School and learned the theology. Around this time, Heo Heon's father, Heo-chu, was said to have served as an insider of the palace. However, Heochu decided to quit his office due to poor health and left his son Heo Heon to Lee Yong-ik. As a child, Heo Heon went to school based on Lee Yong-ik's Sarangchae.

Heo-heon went to Vladivostok in Yeonju and thought that he would extend his visit after his father Hu-chu died and had three years of father-in-law. Kang, an influential person, said that he gave two donkeys and a package to the school district. When he returned to his hometown, Myeongcheon, Hamgyong Province, his mother invited him to marry a woman named Ji-Young Jeong, who lived in Hamhung. Among the children he had from Ji-Young Lee, only her daughter, Ho Jong-suk, survived to adulthood, and later became herself an activist and politician.

He continued to study and climbed to Kyungsung, and his wife's livelihood was made by his wife, Jeong-Young. Afterwards, he remarried with Yoo Deok-hee and had six more children: daughters Huh Geun-wook and sons Ho Seon-wook, Ho Jong-wook, Ho Young-wook, Ho Seon-wook, and Ho Gi-wook.

Ho in 1929

After graduating from Hansung Middle School and Bosung College, he studied abroad in Japan and graduated from the Meiji University Law School. In 1907, he passed the 1st lawyer examination of the Korean Empire, and he obtained a lawyer qualification in Japan. After that, he defended the defense of independence activists, the employment problems of workers, and the issue of wage increases for free. In 1924, he was appointed as the principal of Boseong College and as the chairman of Chosun People's Lawyer. He was famous for traveling around the world for 6 months in 1926, and in 1927 the following year, he was a major executive of a new association. At the end of the Japanese colonial period in 1943, he was involved in a shortwave broadcast smuggling incident, where he also spent two years in prison.

And Ho Hon brought his wife to Hanseongbu, attended Hansung Foreign Language School, studied German, and learned English and Japanese. He learned a foreign language with the determination to major in international law. During this process, he made a lot of colleagues, Lee Yong-ik's grandson Lee Jong-ho and his acquaintance were thick, and he extended his face by greeting several other celebrities such as Lee Gap, Lee Dong-hui, and the Northwest. He graduated from a foreign language school in 1904, the year of the Russo-Japanese War. And for a while, he was appointed as a low-level official in Jigye-amun, Gyujanggak, and Jumu-amun.

=== Independence movement ===
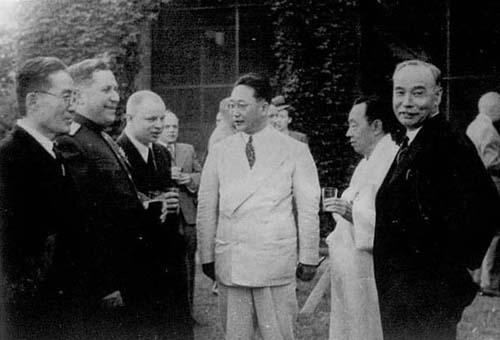
Ho (at left side) during the Second US-Soviet Joint Committee in May 1947

In 1919, he was elected president of the Korean Bar Association. The March 1st Movement of March 1919 made him a representative anti-Japanese lawyer. At the time of the 3.1 movement, Ho Hon took charge of 47 people, including 33 national representatives and 14 related persons. He became famous for his embarrassing Japanese imperialism by defending the leaders of the March First Movement, who were obsessed with the unpredictable knowledge of law theory. In addition, during the trial against the arrested 49 people, it was submitted to the court for filing an indictment of charges, and it was also a hot topic, such as opposition from the prosecutors' prosecutors in court. After that, Ho Hon held a national reputation and performed various projects in addition to his daily attorneys, such as the free-standing defense of the Troops and the Communist Party of Korea.

In the 1920s, at the same time as a lawyer, he devoted himself to the education business. Following this, along with Lee Sang-jae, a private university was founded, but the Governor-General did not give approval, but it had the effect of establishing the Seoul National University. In addition, she paid attention to women's education. A woman activist and an independence activist helped to establish the Duksung Women's University, and when the Dong-A Ilbo was founded, he invested a large amount of 8,000 won to give thanks.

In 1924, he was appointed as the principal of Bosung College, which was poorly managed at the time, and became president of Korean lawyers at the time. At the end of April of that year, when Song Jin-woo stepped down as president, he also acted as president of Dong-A Ilbo for a while.

In April 1925, Cho Dong-ho and Cho Bong-am, who were sent to the Communist Party of Korea's foundation to get approval from the Comintern, were arrested by the Japanese Consulate-General in Shanghai in February 1928 and gave free arguments in Seoul's Gyeongseong District Court. As a result of this, Heo Heon is known not only in Korea but also in Japan.

On the other hand, by this time, Ho Hon is leaning toward a socialist tendency in the mid-left. The sympathetic argument against those involved in the case of the Communist Party of Korea, including Park Hon-young, and the broad communion with the communists, and the fact that all of her daughters, Jeong-sook Heo and her son-in-law, were all members of the Communist Party of Korea, which led him to a socialist tendency.

=== End of the Japanese colonial period ===
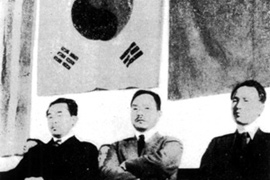
Pak Hon-yong (middle) and Ho Hon (left) attended the 21st anniversary of the founding of the Communist Party of Korea in Seoul in 1946

In the 1930s, his poor salary for professors earned him a plunge into the real estate and mining industries. He even went to the point of relying on livelihood for Yun Ch'iho, Kim Seong-su, and Song Jin-woo.

At the end of the Japanese occupation in 1943, he was involved in a shortwave broadcasting case. At the time, Ho Hon was severely tortured at the age of 58, and the alleged exile of his daughter, Heo Jung-sook, was included in the charges. After two years in prison, his health deteriorated extremely badly, and in April 1945 he was released as a jeweler. Afterward, Ho Hon went down to the house of Munhwa-myeon, Sinchon County, South Hwanghae Province, where his wife's wife is, and was liberated while relaxing at Dalcheon Hot Spring. He was nursed in Sinchon for four months from April 1945.

=== Liberation of Korea ===
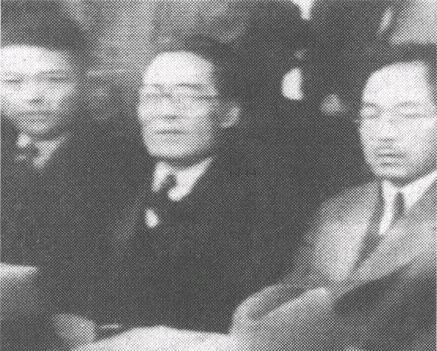
At the 1st US-Soviet Joint Commission. From the left, Kim Won-bong, Ho Hon, and Pak Hon-yong.

On August 15, 1945, the ruling of the Japanese National Presidency and the formation of the National Preparatory Committee under the leadership of Yeo Hyung-hyun were heard, and when Ho Hon lived in Sinchon County, South Hwanghae Province, Chairman Geon-jun Yeo, Yun-hyung sent people to participate in the National Preparatory Committee. Asked. Around this time, Hon Hon was in a nursing home, but he readily agreed and came to Seoul. According to the records at the time, he said, 'I will give everything to the teacher. I believe in my teacher and I will help with all my wisdom. '

On the other hand, Ho Hon continued to criticize the Korean Democratic Party until the early days of the launch of the Korean Democratic Party, but increasingly, Heonheon's public speeches gradually grew in the colors of the defense of the Communist Party of Korea and the criticism of the Korean Democratic Party. He argued that anti-Japanese independence movements under Japanese rule were largely carried out by communists, and in this regard, "We should also thank the Communist Party of Korea," and after the Korean People's Party did not cooperate with the state, they even defended pro-Japanese and terrorists. And accused him of interfering with the complete independence of Joseon. In addition, he visited Ahn Jae-hong, who had been dissatisfied with the advancement of the Communist Party of Korea, and persuaded him several times, but Ahn Jae-hong did not listen and soon withdrew.

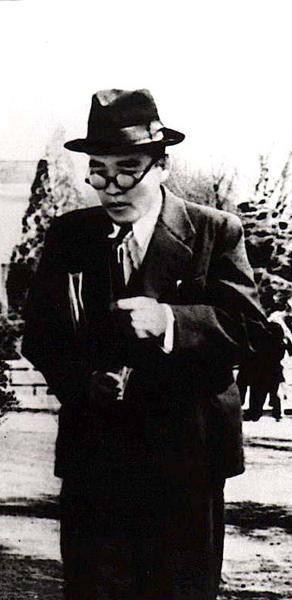
Hon in 1948

On September 4, the General Assembly of the National Assembly was elected as vice-chairman of the National Preparatory Committee, followed by the National People's Congress and prepared for the establishment of the People's Republic of Korea. While participating as a People's Committee, Ho Hon showed a reality that, unlike the Korean People's Party, he had to deny 'temporary government refusalism' and prepare the People's Republic. On September 7, 1945, he was appointed Prime Minister of the Cabinet of the People's Republic of Korea.

When the results of the Moscow Three-Phase Summit were announced in December, he argued that "it is now necessary to establish a provisional government for Koreans through the North and South according to the procedures set out in the "Moscow Protocol", not to follow the rule of Lim Jung. Everyone supported the "Moscow Protocol" and proposed to actively help the activities of the Micro-Community Committee.

Kim Won-bong, Kim Sung-suk, Jang Goon-sang (김성숙 (1898년)), and Sung Joo-sik, who left the Provisional Government of the Republic of Korea on February 15, 1946, were invited to the co-chair of the Democratic People's Front (민주주의민족전선) with Yeo-hyung Baek, Paek Nam-un, Pak Hon-yong, and Kim Won-bong. Subsequently, he was elected the chief chairman of the Democratic Peoples Front.

At the opening of the National Democracy Front, Heo Heon was thinking of the emergency national conference hosted by the Provisional Government, and there is a buzzword of law, which is not right. Ho Hon publicly rejected the idea of the Provisional Government of the Republic of Korea. Recognizing that the provisional government was not approved by the international community, and that the officials returned to Japan as individuals, they accused Lim of deceiving the lawmakers to deceive the people. After Lim Jong-ho's denial, he became the public of the far right group and became the main target of terrorism. He had to move through the residence several times, avoiding raids and terrorist attacks by right-wing youth groups. On the other hand, Ho Hon did not join the political party of the, but acted as an individual. Heo Heon's health was not good because of the disease he got from prison.

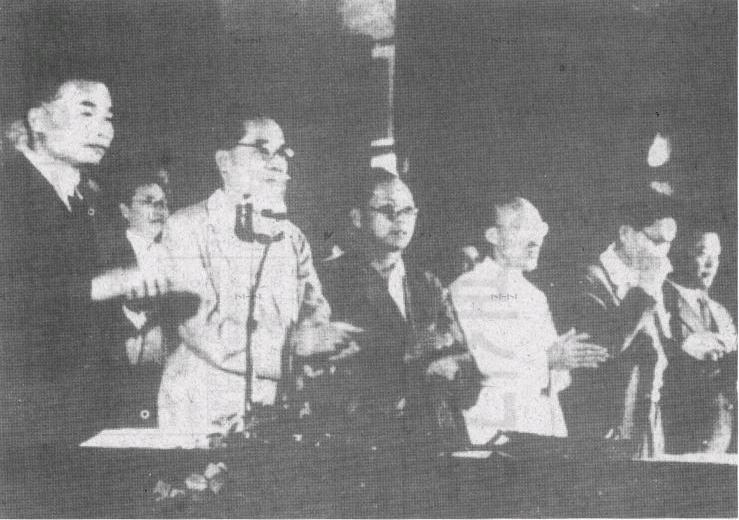
In August 1948, the 'People's Congress' was held in Haeju, Hwanghae Province. From the left, Paek Nam-un, Ho Hon, Pak Hon-yong, and Hong Myong-hui.

In November 1946, he participated in the formation of the South Korean Workers' Party. After the formation of the Workers' Party of South Korea, Lyuh Woon-hyung sat down in office and stopped the conflict with Pak Hon-yong. Around this time, Ho Hon followed, supporting Pak. Later, on August 11, 1947, the US military authorities issued an arrest order against the leader of the South Korean leader, Ho Hon, and declared communist activity in South Korea illegal. Socialists and communists moved side-by-side, avoiding the wanted and oppressive of Pak Hon-yong and Heo-heon, and Heo-hun had to move from time to time in the night, avoiding the eyes of the police, US military, and right-wing youth groups.

=== North Korea ===
In April 1948, for the north–south negotiations, he went to the north of the 38th parallel with Ri Sung-yop of the South Korean Workers' Party and did not come back. He was also elected to the Constitutional Committee of the Supreme People's Assembly. After the official proclamation of the Democratic People's Republic of Korea, he was elected chairman of the Supreme People's Assembly in September. At the same time, from October of that year, he served as president of Kim Il Sung University. Participated in the 2nd Inter-Korean Leaders' Meeting (Second Leadership Meeting of the Socialist Group of the Second Joseon Dynasty) held from July 2 to July 5, 1948.

In June 1949, he was elected chairman of the Central Committee of the Democratic Front for the Reunification of Korea, and in August 1951 he was again elected as chairman of the Supreme People's Assembly. He died in August 1951 after drowning in an accident under suspicious circumstances on the Chongchon River on August 16 of the same year. He received a state funeral. After the funeral at the Moranbong Theatre in Pyongyang on September 7, 1951, he was buried in the Patriotic Martyrs' Cemetery.
