= Kim Yong-won =

South Korean serial killer (born 1966)

- Born: 1966 (age 59–60); North Chungcheong Province, South Korea
- Conviction: Murder x3
- Penalty: Death

Details
- Victims: 3–4
- Span of crimes: March – June 2005 (possibly 1994)
- Country: South Korea
- State: North Chungcheong
- Date apprehended: June 10, 2005

Kim Yong-won (Korean: 김용원; born 1966) is a South Korean serial killer and rapist who killed two women and a child around various cities in North Chungcheong Province from March to June 2005, in addition to being suspected, but never charged with, the 1994 murder of a man during an argument. He was convicted and sentenced to death for the latter crimes, which were compared to the more infamous Yoo Young-chul's murders due to their sheer brutality.

== Early life ==
Kim Yong-won was born on a farmhouse in North Chungcheong Province in 1966, the youngest of four children of rural farmers. His early life was marred by violence, as his violent and alcoholic father frequently beat his spouse and children, while Kim's brother, who was nine years his senior, bullied him in turn. Due to these circumstances, he felt no affection towards his family members, and repeatedly claimed that he could not wait to become an adult so he could leave them. Kim eventually dropped out of middle school and started working up until the age of 20, when he finally left the family household. However, his life did not proceed smoothly as the first woman he loved dearly later left him for his best friend, causing him to harbor hostile feelings towards women as a whole. While acquaintances generally described him as a nice and gentle person, they would also note that has very easily angered and would get violent when drunk.

In addition, Kim was repeatedly imprisoned, with his first conviction for rape, assault and theft dating back to December 1984. He was later kicked out of the Armed Forces for his inability to control his kleptomania, and from 1988 to 2001, he would be repeatedly jailed for a myriad of offences, spending a combined total of 13 years behind bars. In between his prison stints, Kim worked as a driver for a variety of companies, which allowed him to hone his driving skills. Kim would eventually quit around 2005, when he began smuggling Viagra, camphor and ginseng to and from China. In April 2005, he began dating a Korean-Chinese woman and even planned to officially marry her in China in July of that year, but unbeknownst to her, he also dated two mistresses behind her back.

== Crimes ==
=== Suspected murder ===
Kim's first supposed crime took place in April 1994. At that time, he was accused of strangling and bludgeoning a man named Ji with a sledgehammer in Seobu, Goesan County, because he had supposedly slandered him. However, Kim steadfastly denied guilt and despite being considered the prime suspect, he was released due to lack of evidence. Shortly afterwards, he would instead be imprisoned for rape and served a 3-year prison sentence, later followed by other convictions.

=== Serial murders ===
In mid-March 2005, Kim was drinking with his 43-year-old sister-in-law Seong, who was living with him at his apartment in Cheongju. The pair then got into an argument, which resulted in Kim beating and later strangling her. Instead of disposing of the body immediately, he left it inside the house for four days while he went out drinking. As Seong's only close associate was Kim himself, no missing persons report was filed. After eventually returning to the house, Kim asked a younger acquaintance from his hometown to help dispose of the body, but he refused and encouraged him to surrender himself instead. Kim did not heed his advice and instead convinced him to remain silent about the murder; he then wrapped Seong's body in a blanket and moved it to an isolated section of the mountains near Cheongwon-gu, where he buried it.

After the murder, Kim started spending more time with one of his mistresses, a 48-year-old woman surnamed Park, who ran a pub in Cheongju. Their relationship proved to be strained, as he would often talk to his fiancée on the phone in front of Park, sometimes using her own cellphone. On June 3, approximately a month before his scheduled wedding, the pair and a younger friend were drinking at the pub when Park started criticizing Kim for talking on the phone for a prolonged period of time. Infuriated by her reprimands, the drunken Kim told their friend to leave, and after he did, he took hold of Park and smashed her head a dozen times against a gas burner in the kitchen, killing her. After this, he stole 100,000 won from the counter in an attempt to make it look like a robbery, and then fled the scene.

About eight hours later, police received a report that a murdered woman's body was found at the pub, and immediately began investigating. Upon closer inspection, it was quickly determined that the crime scene had likely been staged to look like a robbery by the perpetrator, whom police suspected might be an acquaintance of the victim. After they started looking into Park's associates, authorities eventually came across Kim, who was known to frequent the establishment. Not long after, they received a tip from the young man Kim had attempted to convince to dispose of Seong's corpse, accusing him of this and the 1994 murder.

Two days later, while on the run from the police, Kim visited the country house of his 31-year-old acquaintance, Mr. Choi, in Jincheon County. He then lured Choi's 13-year-old daughter, Yang-eun, to his car, whom he had sexually harassed and assaulted on previous occasions. After raping her this time, however, the girl threatened to tell her father of what he was doing, prompting a drunken Kim to strangle her to death. He then put her body in his car, stole a shovel from a nearby farm and drove to a church near the Baekgog Reservoir, where he buried her in a shallow grave, which he covered with tree branches. Shortly after murdering Yang-eun, Kim returned to her father, and the pair drank alcohol together as if nothing had happened. When Choi filed a missing persons report five days later, Kim even offered to help search for her in the nearby villages.

== Arrest and investigation ==
In the meantime, the authorities had learned that Kim was hiding in an abandoned house in Cheongju, where they found his passport, marriage certificate, a picture of his fiancée, a pot of ramen, a bottle of soju and items indicating that he planned to flee into China. Believing that he might try to ask his family and relatives for money to help him escape, undercover policemen were placed in locations he was known to frequent, and on June 10, Kim was caught by officers in Cheongwon-gu while meeting his maternal cousin.

Initially, he denied all charges against him, but after being presented with an abundance of evidence, Kim confessed to all three murders. Before doing so, he asked that he be permitted a phone call to his fiancée in China, where he told her to consider him "dead" and that she forget that they ever met. Despite this, he continued to deny the 1994 murder, and as there was insufficient evidence to charge him in that case, Kim was charged with the other three killings.

== Trial, sentence and imprisonment ==
At his trial, the Cheongju District Court took into account Kim's previous prison stints for various violent crimes and how he had not shown any sign of rehabilitation. And so, in September 2005, he was found guilty on all counts and sentenced to death. Kim appealed the decision in December to the Daejeon District Court, citing his drinking problems as a mitigating circumstance, but this appeal was promptly dismissed as well. The following year, at his third trial in March 2006, newly appointed Supreme Court justice, Kim Young-ran confirmed the lower courts' ruling, effectively finalizing the death penalty. This was considered a unique decision, as not only was it a much quicker affirmation of a death sentence by the Supreme Court (which usually take a year or more), but also because Justice Kim was an outspoken opponent of capital punishment.

As of February 2022, Kim Yong-won remains on South Korea's death row awaiting execution. At the time, the death of Choi was served as a major inspiration for the draft of a bill which proposed increased funding and focus on childcare centers and providing professional counseling for maltreated children.

== See also ==
- Yoo Young-chul
- List of serial killers by country
