= 1st Central Committee of the Workers' Party of Korea =

1st Central Committee of the Workers' Party of Korea may refer to:

- 1st Central Committee of the Workers' Party of North Korea
- 1st Central Committee of the Workers' Party of South Korea
