= People's Assembly of North Korea =

North Korean legislature from 1947 until 1948

People's Assembly of North Korea 북조선인민회의

Type
- Type: Unicameral

History
- Founded: 21 February 1947
- Disbanded: 10 July 1948
- Succeeded by: Supreme People's Assembly

Structure
- Seats: 237
- Political groups: Democratic Front for the Reunification of Korea (146); Workers' Party of North Korea (86); Korean Democratic Party (30); Chondoist Chongu Party (30); Independent (91)

Elections
- Voting system: Indirect election
- Last election: 17-20 February 1947

Meeting place
- Pyongyang

The People's Assembly of North Korea (Korean: 북조선인민회의) was the provisional supreme state organ of power of the People's Committee of North Korea, then administered by the Soviet Union, where, per the principle of unified power, all government organs were subservient to it. The assembly consisted of 237 deputies elected during a meeting of the provincial, city and county people's committees, political parties and social organizations of North Korea held from 17 to 20 February 1947.

It held its first session on 21–22 February 1947 and held its last session on 9–10 July 1948 after which it was replaced by the Supreme People's Assembly of the newly created Democratic People's Republic of Korea.

== History ==
On 13 November 1946, the Provisional People's Committee of North Korea held elections for the provincial, city and county people's committees, which were the first elections held in North Korea. On 17–20 February 1947, representatives from the provincial, city and county people's committees in North Korea, along with representatives from political parties and social organizations, held a meeting to organize the People's Assembly of North Korea by electing 237 deputies. The People's Assembly of North Korea held its first session on 21–22 February 1947, which organized the People's Committee of North Korea with Kim Il Sung as chairman. The People's Assembly would go on to have an additional four regular sessions and one extraordinary session. It mostly worked on preparations for the establishment of the Democratic People's Republic of Korea.

Its fifth and last regular session was held on 9–10 July 1948, which led to the implementation of the Constitution of the Democratic People's Republic of Korea in northern Korea and the decision to hold elections for the Supreme People's Assembly on 25 August 1948. A vote was held, where full majority voted in favor of the constitution. Assembly vice chairman Choe Yong-gon then said that the Constitution was "unanimously adopted without any amendments!" Assembly member Kim Tu-bong replaced the Taegukgi with the new flag of North Korea, after which Choe declared the constitution to be in effect.

== Election and membership ==
The People's Assembly of North Korea was elected through an indirect election by representatives from the provincial, city and county people's committees, political parties and social organizations across North Korea in a meeting held on 17–20 February 1947.

There were 1,159 representatives who attended the meeting. The representatives of the people's committees at all levels in the meeting were chosen on the basis of one representative per three people's committee deputies. Each political party and social organization sent five representatives to the meeting.

The representatives of the meeting then elected a committee that would screen the nominations for candidacy in the People's Assembly. It was a 15-member committee consisting of Kim Il Sung (as chairman of the Pyongyang City People's Committee), six chairmen of the provincial people's committee, three political party representatives and four social organization representatives. This committee then chose 237 candidates on the basis of 1 candidate per five meeting representatives. The 237 candidates were then elected by all representatives present at the meeting.

The 237 elected deputies of the People's Assembly consisted of 86 deputies from the Workers' Party of North Korea, 30 deputies from the Korean Democratic Party, 30 deputies from the Chondoist Chongu Party, and 91 independent deputies.

Among the 237 elected People's Assembly deputies were 52 workers, 62 peasants, 56 office clerks, 36 intellectuals, 7 businessmen, 10 traders, 4 craftsmen, and 10 religious people.

== Powers ==
The People's Assembly of North Korea exercised legislative powers and was the highest state power institution of the People's Committee of North Korea. It exercised the following powers during its existence:

- Elect the chairman of the People's Committee of North Korea.
- Elect the head of the Supreme Court.
- Elect the head of the Supreme Prosecutors Office.
- Decide on foreign trade.
- Protect national security.
- Adopt the people's economic plan.
- Approve the state budget.
- Create and change administrative areas.
- Release decisions on implementing amnesties.

When the People's Assembly of North Korea is on recess, its powers are exercised on its behalf by the Standing Committee of the People's Assembly of North Korea.

== Sessions ==
The People's Assembly of North Korea met in regular session once every three months. A total of five regular sessions and one extraordinary session were held during the existence of the assembly.

Session	Duration	Decisions
1st	21–22 February 1947	Approved the report "On reviewing the work of the Provisional People's Committee of North Korea.; Elected Kim Il-sung as chairman of the People's Committee.; Authorized Kim Il-sung to organize the People's Committee.; Elected the Standing Committee of the People's Assembly.; Approved the "Regulations on the People's Committee of North Korea".; Approved the "Regulations on the Court of North Korea and the Prosecutors Office of North Korea.; Elected the head of the Supreme Court.; Appointed the head of the Supreme Prosecutors Office.; Discussed and decided on bills.
2nd	15–16 May 1947	Discussed and decided on the comprehensive budget of North Korea.; Decided on the approval of the “Ordinance on the comprehensive budget of North Korea for 1947”; Decided on the approval of the “Ordinance on changing the administrative areas of counties in South Pyongan Province.; Adopted the decision on the supplemental election of judges to the Supreme Court of North Korea.; Elected judges to the Supreme Court.
3rd	18–19 November 1947	Discussed and decided on organizing a committee for enacting the provisional constitution of Korea.; Discussed and decided on drafting a provisional constitution of Korea.; Approved the proposal of the Standing Committee of the People's Assembly on preparing the provisional constitution of Korea.; Organized the committee for enacting the provisional constitution of Korea.; Adopted the decision on delegating the drafting of the provisional constitution of Korea to the next People's Assembly.; Adopted the approved decisions of the Standing Committee of the People's Assembly and the People's Committee of North Korea after the 2nd session of the People's Assembly.
4th	6–7 February 1948	Kim Il-sung delivered the report "On the review of the fulfillment of the plan of 1947 and the people's economic development plan of 1948".; Discussed and approved the decision on the 1948 comprehensive budget.; Discussed the report of the committee for enacting the provisional constitution of Korea.
Extraordinary	28–29 April 1948	Reviewed the results of the work of popular discussion on drafting the constitution of the Democratic People's Republic of Korea.; Approved the decision on endorsing the original draft of the constitution.
5th	9–10 July 1948	Kim Il-sung delivered the report "On the implementation of the constitution of the Democratic People's Republic of Korea".; Decided on holding an election of the Supreme People's Assembly on 25 August 1948.
