= Hong Ki-hwang =

North Korean politician (1883–1960)

- 홍기황

Standing Committee Vice Chairman of the Supreme People's Assembly
- In office 22 December 1953 – 20 September 1957

Personal details
- Born: 1883 Joseon
- Died: 1960 (aged 76–77) Pyongyang, North Korea
- Citizenship: North Korea
- Party: Korean Social Democratic Party

Korean name
- Hangul: 홍기황
- RR: Hong Gihwang
- MR: Hong Kihwang

Hong Ki-hwang (Korean: 홍기황; 1883–1960) was a North Korean independence activist and politician who served as a member of the Supreme People's Assembly, North Korea's unicameral parliament.

== Biography ==
He served as vice chairman of the Korean Social Democratic Party since late 1945. He was vice-chairman of the South Pyongan Provincial People's Committee. In March 1946 he participated in a meeting commemorating the 27th Anniversary of the March First Movement held at the plaza in front of Pyongyang Station and made a speech there. In February 1946 he joined the Provisional People's Committee of North Korea. In February 1947 he participated in the People's Assembly of North Korea. From 29 February 1952 to 16 January 1953 he was the acting director of the National Censorship Committee. In February 1956, Choe Yong-gon was appointed as a vice chairman of the WPK, leaving Hong Ki-hwang, deputy chairman of the KDP since late 1945, to replace him as chairman of the KDP until November 1958 when he was replaced by Kang Ryang-uk. In the 1957 North Korean parliamentary election he was elected a member of the 2nd Supreme People's Assembly. He was purged together with his brother in 1960.
