= Ho Song-taek =

North Korean politician purged in 1958

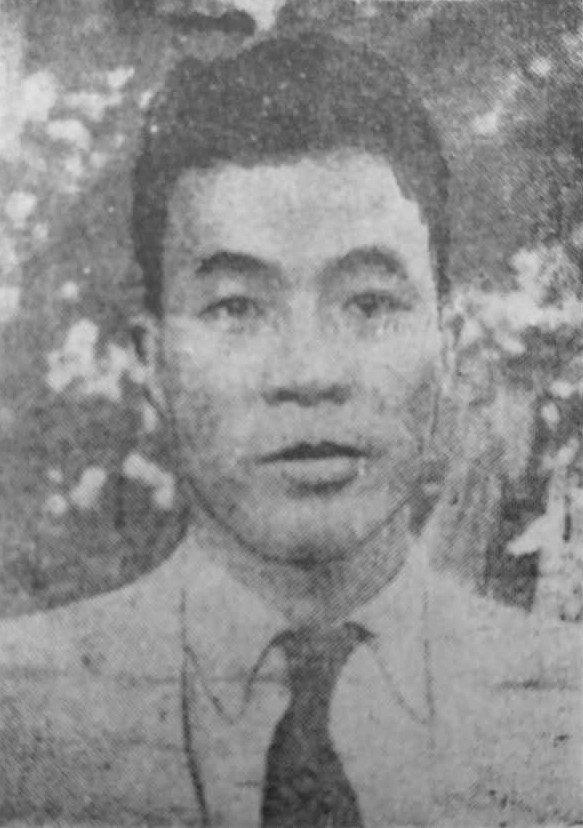
- Ho in 1948

1st Minister of Labor
- In office 9 September 1948 – May 1952
- Preceded by: Post established
- Succeeded by: Kim Won-bong

2nd Minister of Coal Industry
- In office 18 September 1957 – September 1958
- Preceded by: Yu Chuk-un
- Succeeded by: Kim Tae-gun

Personal details
- Born: 1908 North Hamgyong Province, Korean Empire
- Died: 1958 (aged 49–50) North Korea
- Party: Workers' Party of Korea
- Education: Communist University of the Toilers of the East

Military service
- Allegiance: North Korea

Ho Song-taek (Korean: 허성택, 1908 – c. 1958?) was a Korean labor activist, an independence activist, and a politician in the early years of North Korea.

== Biography ==
Born and raised in Seongjin, Hambuk (nowadays Kimchaek), North Hamgyong Province, he led the anti-Japanese movement in solidarity with the unions that existed in Joseon during the Japanese occupation in 1927. At that time, Heo Kuk-taek, Heo Sung-taek, and Heo Young-shik were used as pseudonyms. In the early 1930s, he realized that it was difficult to engage in labor and independence movements without socialism and economic knowledge in Joseon. After returning to the Korean Peninsula in 1935, he joined the labor union and committed to an active strike and anti-Japanese movement toward Japan, and in 1936, he was serving as a prisoner in the Sungjin Farmers Union and served in prison for three years. Since 1940, he has participated in the reconstruction movement of the Communist Party of Korea and, after liberation, organized the National Council of the Korean Workers' Union, a labor movement group affiliated with the Namro Party.

In 1934, he graduated from the Communist University of the Toilers of the East. After returning to Korea following its liberation in August 1945, the organization of farmers and trade unions; August 1948, he became a Central Committee member of the Korean Workers' Party.

In September 1946, he initiated the "September General Strike" of the National Council of Korea Trade Unions, which was the largest strike during the Joseon dynasty. However, the anti-communist youth group and the U.S. military police force failed to crack down on him, and he remained silent for a year before being caught and served for a year in prison.

In September 1948, following the formal declaration on North Korea, he was elected to the Supreme People's Assembly and was appointed the first Labor Minister in the North Korean Cabinet led by Premier of North Korea Kim Il Sung. In 1954, he became Minister of Transport and, in September 1957, Minister of Coal Industry. In 1958, he was purged and executed.
