= Choe Won-taek =

North Korean politician (1895–1973)

- 최원택

Chairman of the Supreme People's Assembly
- In office 20 September 1957 – 16 December 1967
- Vice Chairman: Yi Ki-yong; Kim Chang-jun; Kim Tuk-nan
- Preceded by: Yi Yong
- Succeeded by: Paek Nam-un

Personal details
- Born: 1895 North Hamgyong Province, Joseon
- Died: 17 March 1973 (aged 77–78)
- Party: Workers' Party of Korea

Military service
- Allegiance: North Korea

Korean name
- Hangul: 최원택
- Hanja: 崔元澤
- RR: Choe Wontaek
- MR: Ch'oe Wŏnt'aek

Choe Won-taek (Korean: 최원택; 1895 – 17 March 1973) was a leading North Korean politician who served as Chairman of the Supreme People's Assembly from 1957 to 1967. Furthermore, he was a member of the 2nd, 3rd, 4th and 5th term of the Central Committee.

== Biography ==
Choi was born in Daegu in 1895. From June 1923, he worked as an organizer of yacheika (ячейка, communist cells) in Daegu which was part of the Korburo (Корбюро, a Korean branch of Comintern). He also worked in the socialist ideological group called Sangmihoe (尙微會). In 1924, he participated in the formation of Sinhŭngch'ŏngnyŏn Tongmaeng, which became part of Korean Youth Federation by March of the same year.
