= Paek Nam-un =

North Korean economist (1894–1979)

- 백남운
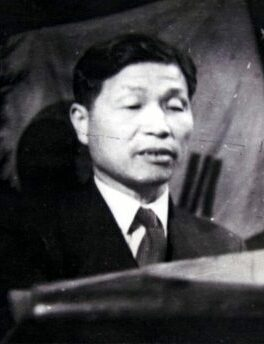
- Paek in 1948

Chairman of the Supreme People's Assembly
- In office 16 December 1967 – 28 December 1972
- Preceded by: Choe Won-taek
- Succeeded by: Han Duk-su

Vice Chairman of the Supreme People's Assembly Standing Committee

3rd term
- In office 23 October 1962 – 16 December 1967 Serving with Pak Chong-ae, Hong Myong-hui, Kang Yang-uk, Pak Kum-chol and Yi Yong-ho.
- Chairman: Choe Yong-gon

2nd term
- In office 25 March 1961 – 23 October 1962 Serving with Hyon Chil-chong, Kim Won-bong, Han Sol-ya and Kang Yang-uk.
- Chairman: Choe Yong-gon

Minister of Education
- In office 9 September 1948 – 16 January 1956
- Premier: Kim Il Sung
- Preceded by: Office established
- Succeeded by: Kim Chang-man

Personal details
- Born: 11 February 1894 North Hamgyong Province, Korea
- Died: 12 June 1979 (aged 85)
- Party: Workers' Party of Korea
- Education: Communist University of the Toilers of the East

Military service
- Allegiance: North Korea

Paek Nam-un (Korean: 백남운; 11 February 1894 – 12 June 1979) was a Korean economist, educator, and political activist during the Japanese colonial period and later a politician in the Democratic People's Republic of Korea.

As a professor of economics at Yeonhee College, he was a leading socialist theorist and applied Marxist principles to Korean history to counter the official narrative of the Japanese colonial government. Along with his colleague Lee Soon-Tak, he was a prominent figure among anti-colonial intellectuals. After Korea's liberation in 1945, Paek became a leader in the Nam Joseon New Democratic Party and advocated for a "New Democracy" through a broad "National Unification Front" that would unite various political parties and social classes.

In April 1948, Paek traveled to North Korea for a unification conference and remained there permanently. He subsequently held several high-ranking posts in the new government, serving as North Korea's first Minister of Education from 1948 to 1956 and later as Chairman of the Supreme People's Assembly from 1967 to 1972.

== Biography ==
=== Early life ===
Paek Nam-un was born in Gochang-gun, Jeonbuk Province, on 11 February 1894. In 1912, at the age of 18, he entered the Suwon Agriculture and Forestry School. He lived in a dormitory, and since tuition was free and he received an additional scholarship, he could concentrate on his studies. After graduating in March 1915, he fulfilled a mandatory teaching appointment at Ganghwa Public Elementary School.

After teaching for two years, he took a position as an engineer with the Ganghwa-gun Forestry Cooperative, where he worked for one year. Concerned about Korea's future under colonial rule and driven by a new intellectual curiosity, he decided to pursue further studies in Japan. He moved there in 1918, eventually graduating from the Tokyo University of Commerce (now Hitotsubashi University) in April 1925.

Upon his return to Korea in 1925, he became a professor of economics at Yonhee College (now Yonsei University), at a time of significant political activity. In April 1925, the Communist Party of Korea was secretly founded in Seoul. Socialist and communist ideas had already been introduced to colonial Korea, often through intellectuals returning from Japan. In response to the growing anti-Japanese movement, which included the founding of the Communist Party and the rise of a Korean Studies Movement, aimed at countering colonial narratives. The Japanese Governor-General intensified suppression efforts, codified by the Peace Preservation Law of 1925, which was used to dismantle the communist movement. Despite this, socialist and communist thought continued to spread, as it was closely linked with the ideology of the anti-Japanese independence movement.

=== Late Japanese colonial period ===
Adopting a Marxist framework of historical materialism, Paek lectured on the history of the Joseon dynasty. He criticized and refuted the "identity theory" promoted by the Japanese Government-General and wrote two influential books on the economic history of Korea: Korea Social Economic History (1933) and Korea Feudal Society (1937).

Simultaneously, Paek engaged in political debates, publishing critiques of the gradual autonomy advocated by national reformists. As a result, he faced intense criticism from proponents of this movement.

As his reputation as an economist grew, Paek attracted a large student following and led a socialist student club called the Economic Research Society. His leadership of this group led to his arrest by Japanese colonial authorities, who imprisoned him for more than two years. Released in 1940, he lived in seclusion, limiting his interactions to a small circle of fellow scholars.

=== After liberation ===
On 15 August 1945, the day of Korea's liberation, he founded the Korea Academy. He then rallied progressive and socialist scholars to support a Marxist-based theory for building a new Korean nation. Following the Moscow Conference in December 1945, Paek, acting as president of the Korea Academy, initially opposed the Allied proposal for a five-year trusteeship over Korea. However, he later reversed his position, aligning with other left-wing factions.

Following these events, Paek became directly involved in politics. He formed a political alliance with key figures from the Yan'an-based Korean independence movement, including Kim Doo-bong, Choi Chang-ik, and Heo Jung-sook. Paek organized and chaired the Gyeongseong (modern-day Seoul) Special Committee of the Korean Independent Alliance. He then founded the Nam Josun New Democratic Party (New People's Party of South Korea) and became its leader. In February 1946, Paek and his party joined the Democratic National Front, a major left-wing political coalition.

==== New Democratic Party Activities ====
After Korea's liberation in 1945, Paek established the Korean Academy of Sciences and participated in cultural movements, though these early efforts were largely fruitless. In February 1946, he became the co-chair of the Democratic National Front (Minjeon), a broad left-wing coalition. Disillusioned by the political realities of the time, he briefly retired from politics.

He returned six months later, in April 1947, publishing an article opposing the establishment of a separate government in the south. He then collaborated with Lyuh Woon-hyung and was appointed vice-chairman of the Working People's Party in May 1947. However, after Lyuh's assassination on 19 July, Paek could not maintain the organization. During a crackdown on left-wing figures in April 1947, he was arrested. Facing threats to his personal safety, Paek arranged for his family to move to North Korea.

Paek opposed the 10 May 1948, general election, which was held only in South Korea to establish a separate state. Instead, he chose to travel to the north with other leaders like Kim Gu to participate in the Joint Conference of Political Parties and Social Organizations from North and South Korea in Pyongyang. His prominent position at the conference was clear, as he delivered a speech following Kim Il Sung and Park Heon-young, and he also served as the moderator for the third meeting.

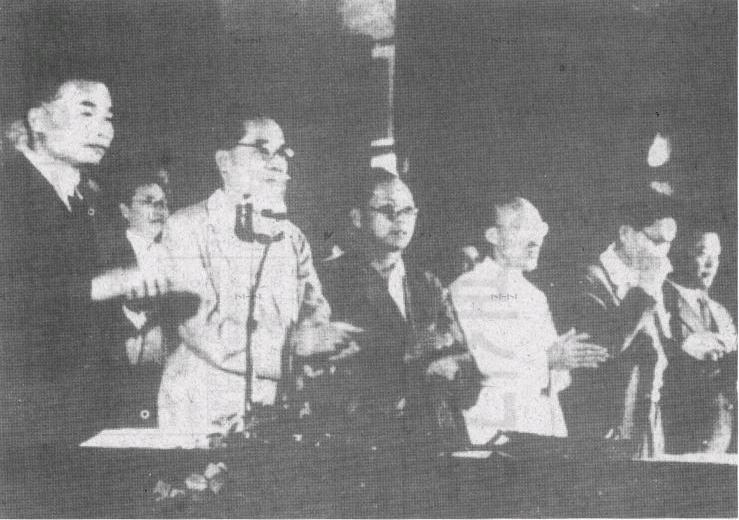
In August 1948, the 'People's Congress' was held in Haeju, Hwanghae Province. From the left, Paek Nam-un, Ho Hon, Pak Hon-yong, and Hong Myong-hui.

Following the conference, he remained in Pyongyang and became a high-ranking official in North Korea, serving as Minister of Education and later as the Chairman of the Supreme People's Assembly, until his death in 1979.

=== North Korea ===
In early 1946, while working with precursor political groups to the North Korean state, Paek Nam-un was tasked with recruiting South Korean scientists and artists to move to the North. Acting as an intermediary for North Korea's intellectual circles, he returned to Seoul and successfully recruited several prominent figures, including historian Kim Seok-hyung, textile industry authority Park Si-hyung, physicist Sang-rok Do, engineers Jae-woo Choi and Young-chang Kang, and artists Yeol-bong Moon, Chul-hwan Hwang, and Young-sin Park.

Following the formal establishment of the Democratic People's Republic of Korea, Paek became a member of the Supreme People's Assembly in 1948. He was appointed the first Minister of Education in the cabinet led by Premier Kim Il Sung and also served as President of the Academy of Sciences of North Korea.

Despite his association with figures like Kim Doo-bong and Choi Chang-ik, Paek managed to survive the political purges of the late 1950s that saw his colleagues removed from power. In 1961, he was elected to the Central Committee of the Workers' Party of Korea and served as the Vice Chairman of the Standing Committee of the Supreme People's Assembly from 1961 to 1962.

He was later elected Chairman of the Supreme People's Assembly in 1967, a post he held until 1972. Afterward, he served as Chairman of the Democratic Front of the Fatherland. He died in 1979 at the age of 85.
