= Ri Yong =

North Korean politician (1889–1960)

- 이영

Chairman of the Supreme People's Assembly
- In office 22 December 1953 – 20 September 1957
- Vice Chairman: Yi Ki-yong; Kim Tuk-nan
- Preceded by: Ho Hon
- Succeeded by: Choe Won-taek

Personal details
- Born: 1 April 1889 Naha-daeri, Bukcheong-myeon, Bukcheong-gun, Hamgyong Province, Joseon
- Died: 13 August 1960 (aged 71) Pyongyang, North Korea
- Resting place: Patriotic Martyrs' Cemetery
- Party: Workers' Party of Korea

Korean name
- Hangul: 이영
- Hanja: 李英
- RR: I Yeong
- MR: I Yŏng

Ri Yong (Korean: 이영; Hanja: 李英; 1 April 1889 – 13 August 1960) was a social activist in Korea under Japanese rule, communist activist, and politician of the Democratic People's Republic of Korea.

== Early life ==
=== Youth and middle age ===
Ri was born in Naha-daeri, Bukcheong-myeon, Bukcheong-gun, Hamgyong Province, Joseon (now in South Hamgyong Province, North Korea), and spent his early childhood in Hamhung. In 1912, he traveled to Shanghai, where he joined an independence movement. He enrolled at Nankai Business School in 1913, but dropped out in 1914, and returned to Korea.

In 1919, he participated in the March 1st Movement in Bukcheong, Hamgyeongnam-do. He was arrested, and remained in prison in Seoul until 1920. The following year, he served as a member of the Seoul Youth Association's Beginner Administrative Committee. He was again arrested in 1928, and spent four years in prison before being released in 1932.

From 1933 he held an administrative position within the Communist Party of Korea, where he rose to an advisory role in 1938.

=== After liberation ===
During the 1945 partitioning of Korea into North and South, Ri was in the American-occupied South. In December 1946, however, he traveled to the Soviet-occupied North, where he served as the deputy director of Planning at the Central People's Committee.

After the founding of the Democratic People's Republic of Korea on 9 September 1948, he was elected to the post of Vice Chairman of the Supreme People's Assembly of the North Korean People's Republic of Korea. On 1 December 1953, following the conclusion of the Korean War, he was elected Chairman of the Supreme People's Assembly, and served as a member of the Supreme Council of the Democratic Front for the Reunification of the Fatherland.

Ri died on 13 August 1960 at the age of 71, and was buried in the Patriotic Martyrs' Cemetery.
