= Pak Hon-yong and Yi Sung-yop spy case =

1952–1953 incident in North Korea

Pak Hon-yong and Yi Sung-yop spy case 박헌영 리승엽 간첩 사건
- Date: 1952 to 1953
- Location: Pyongyang, North Korea
- Participants: Kim Il Sung and his supporters
- Outcome: Pak Hon-yong, Yi Sung-yop, and 11 others were sentenced to death; Lee Won-jo and Yoon Soon-dal were imprisoned.; Former members of the Workers' Party of South Korea (domestic faction) was purged and completely lost power.; Contributed to the 1956 August faction incident

The Pak Hon-yong and Yi Sung-yop case was a case in which the North Korean government accused Pak Hon-yong and Yi Sung-yop, along with 13 other domestic faction officials, of acting as spies for the United States, attempting to launch a military coup to overthrow the Republic and the rule of Kim Il Sung, and preventing Pyongyang from unifying the Korean Peninsula during 1952 and 1953. Due to an unfair trial, all 13 confessed. Ultimately, 10 of them, including Pak Hon-yong and Yi Sung-yop, were executed, and the other two were sent to concentration camps. Kim Il Sung subsequently purged domestic faction members, leading to the complete loss of power for the faction and indirectly triggering the later August faction incident. Most historians question the authenticity of the coup launched by Pak Hon-yong and Yi Sung-yop, and believe it was merely a tactic used by Kim Il Sung to eliminate his political enemies.

== Background ==
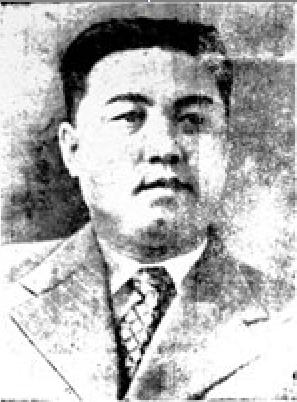
With the support of the Soviet Union, Kim Il Sung eventually overthrew Pak Hon-yong and became the supreme leader of North Korea.

In 1945, Japan surrendered, World War II ended, and the Korean Peninsula was freed from Japanese rule. At that time, the peninsula was divided into two, with the Soviet Union taking over the north. In 1946, the Soviet Civil Administration established the People's Committee for North Korea, and many Koreans who believed in communism also came to join in the following years. Among them, the most influential were Kim Il Sung, the leader of the guerrilla faction, and Pak Hon-yong, the leader of the domestic faction. The confrontation between the two factions was thus formed. In 1948, Kim Il Sung was recognized by the Soviet Union as the national leader, and Kim Il Sung and Pak Hon-yong served as the chairman and vice chairman of the Workers' Party of Korea and the vice premier of the North Korean cabinet, respectively. The guerrilla faction won its first victory in the struggle against the domestic faction. Nevertheless, given the low educational level of the guerrilla faction members, the Soviet Union had to appoint officials from the Yan'an faction, the Soviet faction, and the domestic faction to important positions In the first Central Committee election, the guerrilla faction was only a minority, while the domestic faction won most of the seats. Therefore, the influence of the guerrilla faction within the party was still limited Kim Il Sung also continued to regard Pak Hon-yong and his confidant Yi Sung-yop as political enemies.

In 1950, Kim Il Sung, chairman of the Central Committee of the Workers' Party of Korea, planned to unify the Korean Peninsula through war, a plan agreed to by Pak Hon-yong, who was then appointed vice chairman of the Workers' Party. However, the two had different views on the specific plan. Kim Il Sung believed that South Korea should be occupied by military force in one fell swoop; Pak Hon-yong advocated that while launching a military conflict along the 38th parallel, the political reconciliation path should be discussed with the South Korean government, and the South Korean people should be incited to revolt, so as to achieve the goal of unification without being interfered with by foreign forces. Since the proposals of the two represented the respective propositions of the two factions, the one whose proposal could help North Korea win the war would eventually establish his position in the party. However, as the guerrillas under the domestic faction suffered defeat after defeat, Kim Il Sung's plan was finally established. At the same time, he also took control of the party, military and political power on the grounds of "special needs after the outbreak of war". On the other hand, in order to prevent other factions from taking the opportunity to expand, Kim Il Sung purged the Yan'an faction and the Soviet faction in 1950 and 1951. However, considering that these two factions were supported by China and the Soviet Union, he did not carry out a large-scale purge, but only removed the leaders of the two factions— Mu Chong and Ho Ka-i.

In 1952, the Korean War was coming to an end. Considering that the domestic faction members were no longer of any use and lacked foreign support, Kim Il Sung began to make arrangements to eliminate the faction. At the 5th Plenary Session in December 1952, Kim Il Sung delivered a long speech condemning the domestic faction, led by Pak Hon-yong, for bearing the greatest responsibility for the defeat in the Korean War and the failure to unify the country. This also marked the beginning of the purge of the domestic faction.

== Arrest and trial ==
In early 1953, the official newspaper of the Workers' Party of Korea, Rodong Sinmun, suddenly claimed that Pak Hon-yong, Yi Sung-yop, and others attempted to launch a military coup, but failed. Subsequently, Im Hwa, vice chairman of the Central Committee of the Korea-Soviet Cultural Association, was arrested first, while Pak Hon-yong, Yi Sung-yop, and others were arrested between March and April 1953.

Thirteen domestic officials accused of plotting a coup and other crimes
Name	Image	Position	Representative lawyer	Judgement
Pak Hon-yong		Vice Chairman of the Central Committee of the Workers' Party of Korea; Vice Premier of the Cabinet; Minister of Foreign Affairs	The use of a representative lawyer is not allowed.	Death penalty
Yi Sung-yop		Member of the Politburo of the Workers' Party of Korea	Ike Young-dae	Death penalty
Lee Won-jo		Deputy Chairman of the Propaganda and Mobilization Department	Ike Young-dae	12 years in prison
Sol Jong-sik		Cultural Officer of the Frontline Command of the Korean People's Army	Ike Young-dae	Death penalty
Im Hwa		Vice Chairman of the Central Committee of the Korea-Soviet Cultural Association	Ike Young-dae	Death penalty
Baek Hyung-bok		Ministry of Home Affairs cadres	Li Swe-hung	Death penalty
Yoon Soon-da		Deputy Minister of the Liaison Department	Li Swe-hung	15 years in prison
Cho Il-myung		Member of the Central Committee of the Workers' Party of Korea	Li Swe-hung	Death penalty
Bae Cheol		Minister of the Liaison Department	Jeong Ing-hwa	Death penalty
Park Seung-won		Deputy Minister of the Liaison Department	Jeong Ing-hwa	Death penalty
Cho Yongbok		The superior inspector of the Party Inspection Committee	Jeong Ing-hwa	Death penalty
Yi Kang-guk		Minister of Commerce	Ju Bing-gyu	Death penalty
Maeng Jong-ho		Captain of the 10th Company of the Liberation Guerrilla Force	Ju Bing-gyu	Death penalty

Pak Hon-yong and Yi Sung-yop spy case
- Court: Special Military Tribunal of the Supreme Court of North Korea
- Full case name: The case of the government of the Democratic People's Republic of Korea suing Yi Sung-yop and 12 others
- Decided: 6 August 1953
- Verdict: Life imprisonment
- Transcripts: Trial records of Pak Hon-yong, Ri Ye-hwa, and their conspirators, American imperialist spies who attempted to overthrow the Democratic People's Republic of Korea.

Court membership
- Judge sitting: Kim Ik-sun

On 30 July 1953, three days after the signing of the Korean Armistice Agreement, Lee Song-seol, chief prosecutor of the Supreme Prosecutor's Office, prosecuted 12 people, excluding Pak Hon-yong, for violating Article 25 of the Korean Criminal Code—high-level treason. Park Heon-yong's prosecution was delayed for unknown reasons.

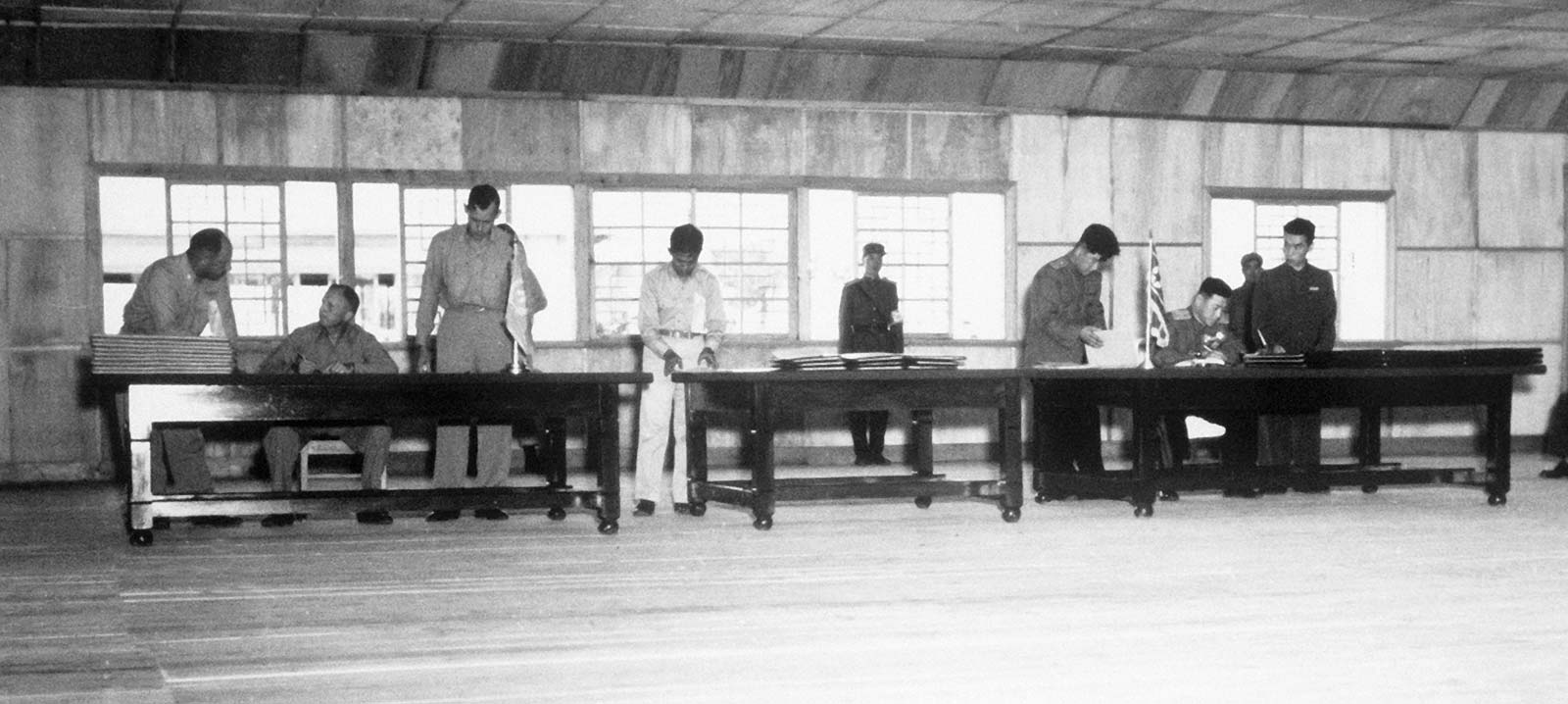
Three days after the signing of the Korean Armistice Agreement, Ri Seung-yeop and 12 others were indicted for treason.

On 3 August 1953, the trial began at the Special Military Tribunal of the Supreme Court of North Korea in Pyongyang. According to records, the presiding judge was Kim Ik-seon, the Chief Justice of the Supreme Court, the presiding judge was Park Yong-sook, the chief prosecutor was Kim Dong-hak, and the prosecutors were Kim Yoon-shik and Lee Chang-ho. In addition, a guard surnamed Park served as the court clerk. At the same time, the trial was conducted in an open manner, and anyone, including foreign journalists, could enter the court to attend the hearing. The Rodong Sinmun also reported on the case. In addition to Pak Hon-yong, the 12 defendants were also allowed to hire lawyers provided by the government.

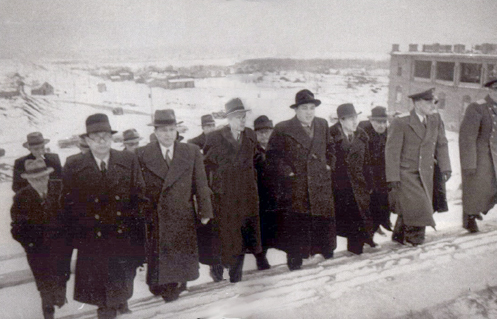
Choe Yong-gon (front row, far left), deputy commander of the Korean People's Army, was the presiding judge in the case of Pak Hon-yong. However, Choe Yong-gon had no legal education whatsoever.

On the first day of the trial, the prosecution charged the 12 defendants with three counts: spying for the United States, attempting to stage a coup to overthrow the Republic and the rule of Kim Il Sung, and preventing Pyongyang from unifying the Korean Peninsula. Subsequently, Kim Ik-seon declared that the prosecution had fully grasped the evidence of their crimes, and therefore warned "the traitor Yi Sung-yop and his cronies who have been cursed by the people of the whole country" to confess the truth.

In the following days, the prosecution called 13 witnesses and presented evidence of the crimes committed by Yi Sung-yop and others. The case states that on 26 June 1950, Yi Sung-yop, who was in South Korea at the time, had contact with Harold Noble, a political advisor from the United States, John R. Hodge, the commander of the U.S. forces in South Korea, and Horace Underwood, an educator. They successfully recruited Yi Sung-yop as a spy and instructed him and his accomplices to launch an armed coup. At that time, the U.S. military would land in Wonsan and Anju.

Subsequently, Pak Hon-yong planned a coup through Lee Seung-yeop's message. They secretly established the Kumgang Political Academy on the border of North Korea and appointed his confidant Kim Eung-bin as its director to train reliable armed men. At the same time, to ensure the success of the coup, Yi Sung-yop first notified Liaison Minister Bae Cheol of the coup in September 1951 and asked him to assist him. In February 1952, Yi Sung-yop arranged for Meng Jong-ho, the captain of the 10th guerrilla company, to move his troops from Huaiyang County to Jung-hwa County, which is near Pyongyang, in order to gather 4,000 people to start an uprising.

At the same time, Yi Sung-yop and his confidants met at Park Hon-yong's residence. They determined that if the coup succeeded, Yi Sung-yop would become the first secretary of the newly established Korean Communist Party, Park Hon-yong would become the prime minister, Jang Si-woo and Joo Ning-ha would become the vice prime ministers, Park Seung- won would be the minister of the Interior, Lee Kang-guk would be the minister of the Foreign Affairs, Kim Eung-bin would be the minister of the Armed Forces, Jo Il-myung would be the minister of the Propaganda, Lim Ha would be the minister of Education, Bae Chol would be the minister of Labor, and Yoon Soon-da would be the minister of Commerce. In addition, they decided to launch the coup in the first week of September 1952. However, the coup was eventually discovered by Kim Il Sung and failed.

All 12 defendants admitted to the charges brought by the prosecution. During the trial, Lee Kang-guk repeatedly referred to himself as a lackey of American imperialism in court. Their lawyers did not defend or plead for their clients, but instead pleaded guilty on their behalf. On August 6, the last day of the trial, Lee Seung-yeop's lawyer stated in his closing statement that "although Yi Sung-yop calls himself a communist, he and his followers are nothing short of capitalists." Other lawyers made similar statements, claiming that their clients' poor background and corrupt lifestyle led them to have reactionary thoughts.

Afterwards, Yi Sung-yop and 12 others confessed to all the charges again during their confessions and said they felt deeply remorseful for their actions Yi Sung-yop thanked the presiding judge in front of everyone for giving him the opportunity to speak freely during the four days, and said he would face any punishment calmly, because life and death were no longer important to him. Lee Kang-guk then said that he was very happy that the country and the people had given him the opportunity to atone with his death Lim Ha claimed that he attempted suicide before the trial because he was afraid that people would expose his ugly side in court.

After deliberation, the jury found all 12 defendants guilty on all charges. Kim Ik-sun then sentenced Lee Won-jo and Yoon Soon-da to 12 and 15 years in prison, respectively, and the remaining 10 to death.

=== Park Hon-yong's Trial ===
Pak Hon-yong and Yi Sung-yop spy case
- Court: Special Military Tribunal of the Supreme Court of North Korea
- Full case name: Government of the Democratic People's Republic of Korea v. Pak Hon-yong
- Transcripts: Trial records of Pak Hon-yong, Yi Sung-yop, and their conspirators, American imperialist spies who attempted to overthrow the Democratic People's Republic of Korea.

Court membership
- Judge sitting: Choi Yong-geon

During the trial of Yi Sung-yop and others, Park Hon-yong was under house arrest. On 15 December 1955, two years and four months after Yi Sung-yop and others were brought to court, Park Hon-yong was indicted. He was charged with the same crimes as Yi Sung-yop and others: spying for the United States, attempting to launch a coup, and preventing Pyongyang from unifying the Korean Peninsula. This trial was also held in the Special Military Court of the Supreme Court of North Korea. The presiding judge was Choi Yong-gon, the prosecution lawyer was Kang Sang-ho, and the jury consisted of four people: Kim Ik-seon, Lim Hae, Bang Hak-se, and Cho Sung-mo. All of them were Kim Il Sung's confidants At the same time, Park Hon-yong was not allowed to hire a representative lawyer.

Compared to the previous trial of Yi Sung-yop and others, which lasted four days, this trial lasted only eight hours, from the start of the trial at 10 a.m. to the reading of the verdict at 8 p.m. The case states that Pak Hon-yong had already acted as a spy for the United States in 1919, and then surrendered to the Japanese colonial government in 1925, exposing the secrets of the Korean Communist Party, which led to the arrest of the organization's leaders. Afterwards, the US government instructed him to lead Lee Kang-guk and others to infiltrate the Korean government from South Korea, and then arrange his own wings within the party and government to provide secret intelligence to the United States. Subsequently, when he served as Minister of Foreign Affairs, he used his position to sow discord between the allied countries of China and the Soviet Union. During the Korean War, he incited militants to participate in unnecessary riots to deplete the strength of the Korean People's Army, and on the other hand, he repeatedly provided military intelligence about North Korea to the US military intelligence agencies so that Kim Il Sung could not unify the Korean Peninsula In addition, the prosecution also pointed out that when the police sealed Park Heon-yong's residence, they found 870,000 North Korean won and 1,600 grams of gold of unknown origin, which was enough to prove that he had been living a luxurious life. At the same time, in order to prove Park Heon-yong's crimes, the prosecution also brought nine witnesses to court.

Pak Hon-yong admitted to all of the charges brought by the prosecution. That evening, the chief prosecutor read out the verdict, stating that the defendant had committed serious treason, was guilty, and should be sentenced to death according to the criminal law, and all his property was confiscated. Pak Hon-yong then admitted to all the crimes again and claimed to be the leader of the spies, so he was willing to bear all the responsibility:

Before I came here, I had a premonition that I would not survive. (omitted) As you say, I was a spy for the US imperialists. But the US imperialist spies you advocate are completely different from the US imperialist spies I advocate. I had connections with the Americans when I was in South Korea, no, a long time ago. But this was for the liberation, independence and unification of the motherland, and was by no means an act of espionage. (omitted) As you say, I was a spy for the US imperialists. Everything was my doing, and the South Korean Labor Party cadres bear no responsibility at all. They are all upright patriots who work day and night for the liberation, unification and socialist revolution of the motherland. I am willing to accept whatever punishment is imposed on me. Please forgive the innocent South Korean Workers' Party cadres. I beg you again.

== Aftermath ==
=== Purge of the Domestic faction ===
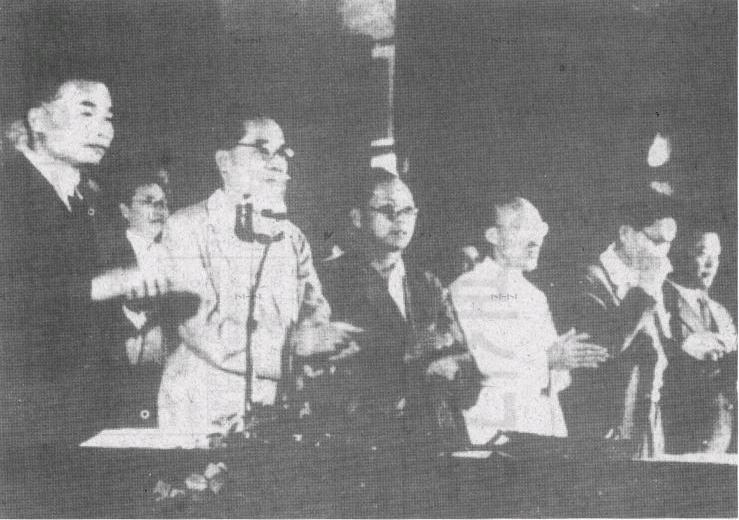
Because of his high level of education, Pai Nam-yun (far left) was one of the few domestic officials who have not been purged.

After executing Pak Hon-yong and others, Kim Il Sung launched a major purge against the domestic faction. At that time, Kim Il Sung divided the domestic faction officials into three categories. The first category consisted of people who were useful and did not show any signs of rebellion. After receiving ideological education, they were able to return to work in the government. For example, the Minister of Education Paik Nam-un. The second category consisted of people who were neither useful nor showed any signs of rebellion. They would be sent to farms to work. The last category consisted of people who were not useful but had influence, such as the Minister of Propaganda Park Gap-dong. They would be imprisoned for a period of time.

In addition, the Geumgang Political Academy, which was managed by the domestic faction, was also shut down, and all its teachers and students were arrested. Some of the remaining members of the domestic faction, such as Kim Eung-bin, Ju Ning-ha, Jang Si-woo, Kim O-sung, Ahn Ki-sung and Kim Kwang-soo, were removed from their positions as members of the Central Committee of the Workers' Party of Korea and from their party membership, while Kwon O -jik was removed from his position as an alternate member and from his party membership. By this time, the power of the domestic faction had been dismantled.

To this day, the Pyongyang government still regards Pak Hon-yong and others as reactionaries and sectarians. In December 2013, after Jang Song-thaek, a member of the Political Bureau of the Central Committee of the Workers' Party of Korea, was executed, the Korean Central Television described Jang Song-thaek as "an extremely evil sectarian force that should receive the most severe historical judgment, like the party of Yi Sung-yop and Pak Hon-yong".

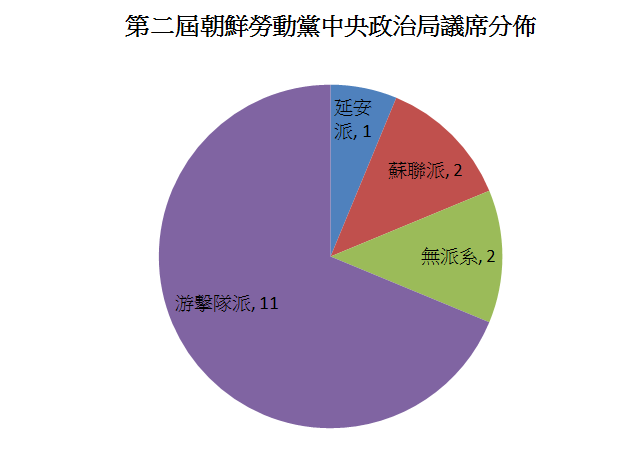
By the 1950s, the domestic faction's power had been dismantled. In the second Politburo election in 1961, the domestic faction failed to win any seats.

=== August faction incident ===
Kim Il Sung launched a major purge of domestic factions and purged Mu Chong and Ho Ka-i, which sparked fear among the Yan'an faction and Soviet faction reformists. In addition, influenced by the de-Stalinization movement, these officials gradually became deeply dissatisfied with Kim Il Sung's personality cult and the economic policies he implemented. In June 1956, they took advantage of Kim Il Sung's visit to Eastern Europe to plan a palace coup, known as the August faction Incident. In the end, the coup failed. Kim Il Sung then took the opportunity to eliminate the Yan'an faction and the Soviet faction, implemented a more hardline rule, and indirectly laid the foundation for the Kim family's long-term dictatorial rule over North Korea.

== Analysis ==
Due to numerous unfairness and loopholes during the trial, many scholars have expressed doubts about the charges against Pak Hon-yong and others. Korean historian Andrei Lankov pointed out several contradictions in his work. He questioned that Harold Nobel and John Reed Hodge had limited political status and were not qualified to participate in the task of instructing others to engage in espionage and launching a coup. More importantly, Harold Nobel was not on the Korean Peninsula at the time, but was on vacation in Japan, so it was impossible for him to have had any contact with Yi Sung-yop. As for the prosecution's claim that the Kumgang Political Academy, which Pak Hon-yong and others secretly established, was actually established by the Pyongyang government through a resolution. Therefore, Lankov criticized the entire trial as a farce.

Xu Dasu, director of the Institute for Korean Peninsula Studies at the University of Hawaiʻi, also pointed out that John Reed Hodge was an anti-communist. Before Pak Hon-yong defected to North Korea, he had repeatedly suppressed the spread of communism in South Korea and ordered the arrest of Pak Hon-yong and others. Therefore, it is not credible to say that Hodge colluded with Pak Hon-yong and others. At the same time, Xu Dasu continued to point out that the judge presiding over the Yi Sung-yop case was Choi Yong-gun, who had no legal background, and the jury was Kim Il Sung's confidant. It can be seen that the trial was unfair. The nine people who testified in court that Yi Sung-yop attempted to rebel were also supporters who had followed him for many years. Therefore, they were very likely to be witnesses involuntarily. Based on these views, Xu Dasu believed that these two trials were just show trials, taking the opportunity to remove the domestic faction.

== Sources ==
- Lankov, Andrei (2002). From Stalin to Kim Il Sung: The Formation of North Korea, 1945-1960. Rutgers University Press. ISBN 978-0813531175.
- Suh, Dae-Sook (1988). Kim Il Sung: The North Korean Leader. Columbia University Press. ISBN 9780231065733.
- Zheng, Jinxi (2010-02-01). "북으로 간 언론인들의 비참한 말로형장의 이슬로 사라져간 박헌영, 임화, 이승엽". 新東亞.
- "历史回顧：金日成開展的党內鬥爭". 多維新聞. 2012-09-14. Archived from the original on 2013-11-12.
