= August faction incident =

1956 failed North Korean coup

- Part of Cold War, De-Stalinization
- Date: 30 August 1956
- Location: North Korea
- Caused by: De-Stalinization policies in the Eastern Bloc; Dissatisfaction with Kim Il Sung's policies; Opposition to Kim Il Sung's cult of personality
- Goals: Removal of Kim Il Sung as Chairman of the Workers' Party of Korea and Premier of North Korea
- Result: Guerrilla faction victory: The plotters fail to remove Kim Il Sung from power; Consolidation of Kim Il Sung's status

Parties
Guerrilla faction	Yan'an faction; Soviet faction; Supported by: China; Soviet Union

Lead figures
Kim Il Sung and his supporters	Yan'an faction; Kim Tu-bong (MIA); Ch'oe Ch'angik (executed); Soviet faction; Pak Chang-ok (executed)

- August faction incident
- Hangul: 8월 종파 사건
- Hanja: 八月宗派事件
- RR: 8wol jongpa sageon
- MR: 8wŏl chongp'a sakŏn

The August faction incident, known in North Korean histography as the Second Arduous March, was an unsuccessful attempt to remove Kim Il Sung, the chairman of the Workers' Party of Korea (WPK) and the premier of North Korea, from power by leading North Korean figures from the Soviet faction and the Yan'an faction, with support from China and the Soviet Union, at the second plenary session of the 3rd WPK Central Committee in 1956. The attempt to remove Kim failed and the participants were arrested and later executed. Through this political struggle, Kim quashed all opposition to him within the party leadership.

The leaders of the coup included the Vice Premier of the Cabinet Ch'oe Ch'angik, the Chairman of the Standing Committee of the Supreme People's Assembly Kim Tu-bong, the Minister of Construction Kim Sung-hwa, the Minister of Commerce Yun Gong-chin, and the Chairman of the General Federation of Trade Unions Suh Hwi, all of whom were members of the reformist faction within the WPK. They opposed Kim Il Sung's cult of personality and believed that his economic policies were causing serious problems. The plot was dismantled in just half a day and the plotters were purged. Afterwards, the plotters convinced China and the Soviet Union to send a joint delegation headed by Peng Dehuai and Anastas Mikoyan to force Kim to revert his purge. Kim temporarily relented, convincing China and the Soviet Union to not remove him from power, but he resumed his purges soon afterwards,

Regarded by historians as one of the most far-reaching events in North Korea, Kim Il Sung's power was not only not challenged, but was gradually consolidated due to the plot. It also indirectly laid the foundation for the Kim family's long-term rule over North Korea and affected the country's relations with China and the Soviet Union.

== Background ==
=== Factionalism in the Workers' Party of Korea ===
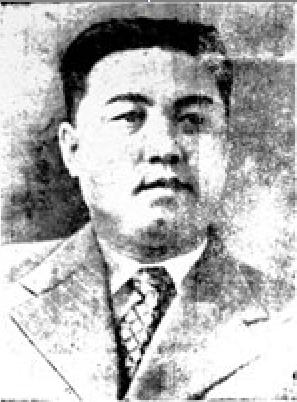
In 1948, Kim Il Sung was appointed the leader of North Korea by the Soviet Union. The picture shows Kim Il Sung in the 1950

Since the founding of North Korea in 1948, the ruling party of the country has been the Workers' Party of Korea (WPK). However, since the party was formed by the merger of many different factions of communist and non-communist parties, there emerged different factions in the WPK. Among them included the Soviet faction of those hailing from the Soviet Union, the Yan'an faction which had close ties with the Chinese Communist Party, the domestic faction composed of former members of the Workers' Party of South Korea, and the guerrilla faction whose members fought against the colonial government during the Japanese rule of Korea. The guerrilla faction and the Yan'an faction were considered to have made the greatest contributions during the resistance against Japan. With the support of the Soviet Union, Kim Il Sung, the leader of the guerrilla faction, became North Korea's supreme leader. The Yan'an faction secured 6 out of 13 seats in the Politburo of the Workers' Party of Korea. These two factions thus became the most influential factions in the party at that time.

In 1948, the Soviet Red Army withdrew from the Korean Peninsula, meaning that Kim Il Sung lost Soviet military support. To prevent other factions from taking the opportunity to expand their power, he purged the leaders of various factions during the Korean War, which he launched in 1950. In December 1950, he first dismissed Mu Chong, the leader of the Yan'an faction and vice minister of the National Defense Department and commander of the artillery of the Korean People's Army, for failing to defend Pyongyang. In 1951, he dismissed Ho Ka-i, the leader of the Soviet faction, from all his posts on charges of failing to repair the reservoir and obstructing the expansion of the party.

During this time, there was increasing conflict between Kim Il Sung and Pak Hon-yong, the leader of the domestic faction. Pak was originally a core figure of the Communist Party of Korea and was highly respected by the Soviet Union. He later joined the Workers' Party and was highly regarded within the party. On the other hand, his position on many policies was contrary to that of Kim Il Sung. The two had different views on how to launch an offensive against South Korea and whether to negotiate peace during the war. In November 1952, Pak Hon-yong delivered a speech commemorating the 35th anniversary of the October Revolution. When mentioning the Korean independence movement, he repeatedly emphasized the leading position of the Korean Communist Party and did not mention Kim Il Sung's name. Considering the lack of foreign support for the domestic faction and their dissatisfaction with Pak, Kim Il Sung arrested him in 1953 on the grounds that he was a spy for the United States. In July 1953, the Korean War ended, and Kim Il Sung continued his purge. Ten people, including Yi Sung-yop and Kwon Oh-jik, were executed on the same day for espionage, leading the domestic faction's power to plummet.

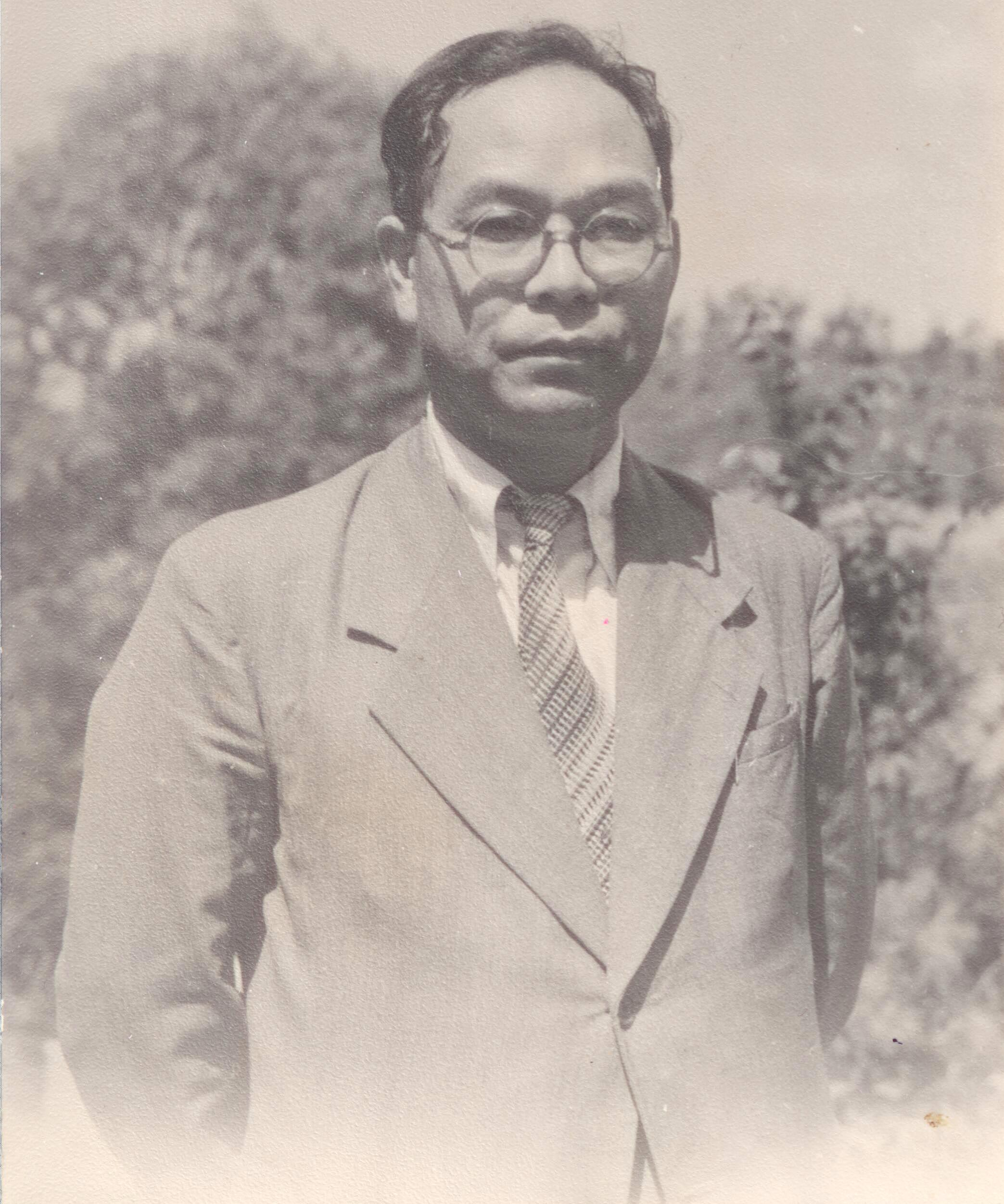
Kim Il Sung's purge of Pak Hon-yong and others led to unease among the Yan'an faction and the Soviet faction, thus sowing the seeds for a coup.

Afterwards, Kim Il Sung turned his attention to Pak Il-u, a representative of the Yan'an faction who held military power. During the Korean War, Pak was the Minister of Internal Affairs and Deputy Political Commissar of the Joint Command, and was the liaison between the North Korean government and Beijing. Towards the end of the war, Kim Il Sung informed Beijing that Pak would be recalled and replaced by his confidant Choe Yong-gon. However, although Pak had been relieved of his post of liaison with Beijing, he still maintained contact with the Chinese government, which displeased Kim Il Sung. At the plenary session of the Central Committee of the Workers' Party of Korea held in April 1955, Kim Il Sung criticized Pak Il-u by name for "posing as a representative from China", forming cliques and attempting to split the party, and placed him under house arrest. In December 1956, he was expelled from the Central Committee and his party membership was revoked.

The Soviet faction then became the target of the attack. According to official Soviet archives, Kim Il Sung had no hostility toward the Soviet faction after eliminating Ho Ka-i. However, with Pak Chang-ok's large-scale promotion of Soviet faction cadres in 1955, he had objections to Kim's handling of Ho Ka-i, which increased Kim Il Sung's suspicion. In order to attack Pak Chang-ok, Kim Il Sung misled Pak's confidant, Park Yong-bin, the Minister of Propaganda of the WPK Central Committee, to explain the "historical role of the masses" when publishing periodicals. Coincidentally, Song Dal-beom, the editor of the political propaganda magazine New Joseon, refused to publish the novel by Han Sorya, a writer who was deeply loved by Kim Il Sung. In this way, Kim Il Sung found more reasons to criticize Park. At the subsequent Central Committee plenary session, Kim dismissed Park Yong-bin from his post for his erroneous tendencies in literary work and his attack on proletarian literature. As for Pak Chang-ok, considering his active role in the previous struggle against Pak Hon-yong, he was only expelled from the Political Committee, but retained his position as Vice Prime Minister. Nevertheless, the main Soviet faction cadres had all been expelled from the core of power.

After a series of purges, the Yan'an faction, the Soviet faction and the domestic faction within the Workers' Party were all severely weakened, while the guerrilla faction led by Kim Il Sung rose to prominence. However, this also led to fear among Yan'an and Soviet faction officials such as Kim Tu-bong, Ch'oe Ch'angik and Pak Chang-ok, who planned to launch a counterattack.

=== The Rise of Khrushchev and De-Stalinization ===
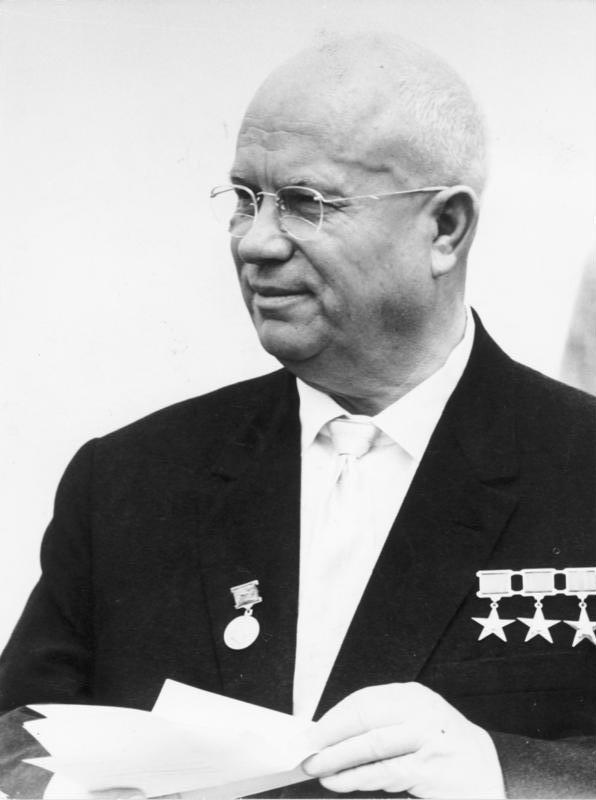
The de-Stalinization policies of Nikita Khruschev indirectly contributed to the incident.

Although he became North Korea's supreme leader, Kim Il Sung's power was limited due to the factions in the government. To expand his power, Kim Il Sung imitated Soviet leader Joseph Stalin and implemented a cult of personality to cement his prestige in the party and the country. In the early days of the founding of the country, Kim Il Sung required painters and writers to depict him as a hero who resisted the Japanese colonial government. In addition, he was described by the propaganda department as a leader who cared for the people like a father. After the Korean War, he was portrayed as a national hero who led the country to victory and was given the title of "the invincible iron commander". After that, portraits, movies, music and posters about praising Kim Il Sung spread throughout the country.

In 1953, Stalin died, and after a series of power struggles, Nikita Khrushchev emerged as the leader of the Soviet Union. Once his power was consolidated, Khrushchev implemented a series of measures. Politically, he adopted a policy of de-Stalinization suspending Stalin's cult of personality, and then eased the oppressive Soviet rule over its satellite states, adopting a more conciliatory approach. He also allowed for partial liberalization of the arts. Economically, he changed the Soviet government's reliance on heavy industry and intensive agriculture, allowing for limited marketization. These policies subsequently triggered a chain reaction in neighboring socialist countries, including the 1956 Poznań protests, Bulgaria's economic reforms, and China's Hundred Flowers Campaign. Throughout the Soviet Bloc domestic Communist parties inaugurated campaigns against personality cults, and the general secretaries who modelled themselves after Stalin were deposed throughout Eastern Europe.

As a supporter of Stalin, Kim Il Sung was uneasy about Khrushchev's remarks and policies. To eliminate the impact of Khrushchev's remarks, the Workers' Party's official newspaper, Rodong Sinmun, removed the terms "cult of personality" and "collective leadership" from his speech. At the same time, Kim Il Sung sent secret letters to party members, emphasizing that "the errors exposed by the 20th Congress of the CPSU do not occupy any place in the activities of the Workers' Party". On the other hand, in order to counter de-Stalinization, Kim Il Sung put forward the Juche ideology, which pointed out that the policies and guidelines implemented in North Korea must take into account the actual situation in the country and should not follow foreign countries in everything. Although Kim Il Sung tried his best to prevent Khrushchev's ideas from entering North Korea, the members of the Workers' Party's reformist faction were still able to learn about all of this through Soviet newspapers sold in Pyongyang, and they hoped that Kim Il Sung would change his mind.

However, Khrushchev's reforms did not receive a positive response from Kim Il Sung: North Korea continued to implement highly collectivized agriculture and rely on heavy industry to develop its economy, and there was no sign of change in Kim Il Sung's cult of personality and repressive rule. On 19 March 1956, Kim Il Sung received Khrushchev's speech report On the Cult of Personality and Its Consequences and told the Soviet Embassy that he would earnestly implement it in the actual work of the Party. However, Kim Il Sung instead strongly criticized Pak Hon-yong for engaging in a cult of personality at the Central Committee plenary session the following day. At the 3rd Congress of the Workers' Party from 23 to 28 April 1956, North Korean Korean ambassador to the Soviet Union Lee Sang-jo twice sent notes to the congress's presidium, demanding that the issue of cult of personality be discussed. As all the speeches read in the congress were censored by Central Committee departments loyal to Kim Il Sung, this attempt failed. Kim Il Sung did not discuss the issues of personality cult and economic line, but instead praised North Korea's economic achievements and criticized the "sectarian activities that split the party" of the domestic faction. This led to dissatisfaction among reformist members, and Lee Sang-jo lamented that the Korean Revolution Museum had become "a museum of Kim Il Sung's personal career". When meeting with the Soviet ambassador, Vice Premier Pak Chang-ok pointed out that Kim Il Sung not only failed to properly handle the contradictions between factions, but also used nepotism, which exacerbated the cult of personality within the party. Under various dissatisfactions with Kim Il Sung, the reformists finally came up with the idea of launching a coup.

Reformist members who plotted the coup
Name	Image	Office	Faction	Aftermath of the incident
Kim Tu-bong		Chairman of the Standing Committee of the Supreme People's Assembly	Yan'an	Missing
Ch'oe Ch'angik		Vice Premier of the Cabinet	Yan'an	Executed
Pak Chang-ok		Vice Premier of the Cabinet	Soviet	Executed
Suh Hwi		Chairman of the General Federation of Professional Unions of Korea	Yan'an	Fled to China
Yun Gong-chin		Minister of Commerce	Yan'an	Fled to China
Lee Sang-jo		North Korean Ambassador to the Soviet Union	Yan'an	Remained in the Soviet Union before fleeing to South Korea in 1989
Lee Pil-kyu		Minister of Building Materials	Yan'an	Fled to China
Kim Sung-hwa		Minister of Construction	Soviet	Sent to the Soviet Union by Kim Il Sung to study science before the conference, and never returned home

== Planning ==
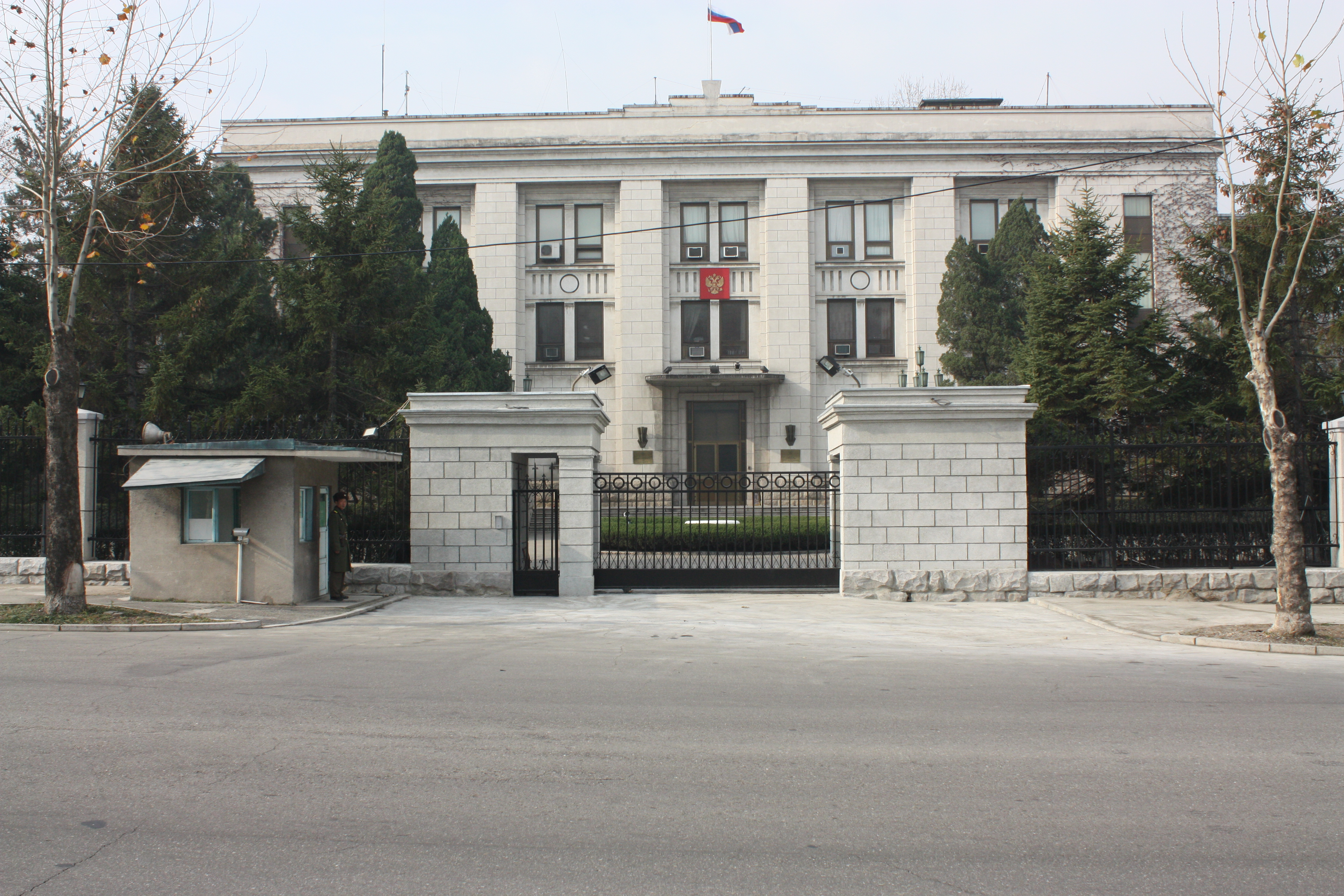
Reformists met with the Soviet embassy in North Korea from time to time during the planning of the coup. The picture shows the renovated Russian embassy.

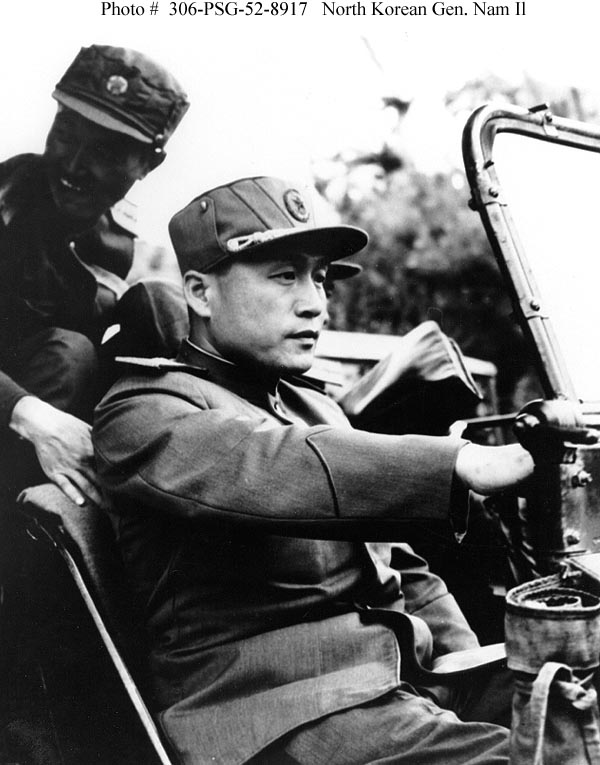
The reformists attempted to win over Nam Il, a close confidant of Kim Il Sung, but failed.

During the Korean War, North Korea was severely damaged and needed a significant amount of funds for reconstruction and economic development. To this end, Kim Il Sung visited several socialist countries, including the Soviet Union, Poland and East Germany, from 1 June to 19 July 1956, in order to get more economic aid. During this period, reformist officials who were increasingly dissatisfied with Kim Il Sung, such as Kim Tu-bong, Ch'oe Ch'angik, Pak Chang-ok, Suh Hwi and Yun Gong-chin, took the opportunity to meet at the Soviet Embassy in Pyongyang to discuss the feasibility and methods of removing Kim Il Sung. In the end, they, who held seats on the Central Committee, decided to impeach Kim Il Sung at the Central Committee plenary session held from 2 to 4 August. According to the Rules of the Workers' Party of Korea, members of the Central Committee could elect the chairman, so they theoretically also had the right to impeach him. This would have required 36 out of 71 members of the Central Committee voting to remove him. The conspirators also aimed to expel some of Kim's supporters from the Central Committee, which led Kim to respond by sharing responsibility for their alleged misdeeds, effectively protecting them.

In order to gain support, reformist members tried to win over Kim Il Sung's confidants. In early July, Pak Chang-ok met with Foreign Minister Nam Il and Pak Chong-ae, chairwoman of the Democratic Women's League of Korea. He told them that he knew someone would oppose Kim Il Sung at the upcoming Central Committee plenary session and asked if they would participate. They refused. Meanwhile, the reformists also tried to win the support of China and the Soviet Union. Given that the Soviet Union's attitude toward Kim Il Sung was unclear, the Yan’an faction sent Ch'oe Ch'angik to visit Vasily Ivanov, the Soviet ambassador to North Korea, on 5 June. Ch'oe hoped that the Soviet leaders would talk about “political issues of the party and government leadership” when they met with Kim Il Sung. Ivanov felt that Ch'oe had something to say, so he arranged to meet him at his home two days later. When Ch'oe arrived at Ivanov's residence, he complained about various issues within the senior leadership, including factionalism, nepotism, Kim Il Sung's cult of personality, poverty and attacks on Soviet Koreans, pointing out that there were “unhealthy phenomena” in the Workers’ Party and the state, such as nepotism, “party leaders” being unwilling to accept criticism, and party meetings not being able to speak freely. While he did not ask for Kim to be removed, he recommended Kim be given advice to listen to. However, the Soviet embassy ultimately did not intervene. Subsequently, Pak Chang-ok made contact with Leonid Brezhnev, the secretary of the Central Committee of the Communist Party of the Soviet Union. Soon after, Lee Sang-jo visited the Soviet Union and conveyed to the reformists the message that Moscow was dissatisfied with Kim Il Sung. Encouraged by this, Pak Chang-ok and Ch'oe Ch'angik frequently met with Ivanov for detailed discussions and decided to launch an offensive against Kim Il Sung. On 14 July. Li Bi-kui, a veteran of the Yan'an faction, told Petrov, the representative of the Soviet embassy, that he would “take action” against Kim and his confidants, with the aim of “replacing the current leadership of the Party Central Committee and the government”.

On the other hand, Yan'an sent people to the Chinese Embassy in North Korea several times that month and made secret contact with embassy staff. Although Chinese leader Mao Zedong had some reservations about Khrushchev's de-Stalinization, he and Peng Dehuai, the vice premier and minister of national defense of China, expressed no opposition to the coup due to their personal grudges with Kim Il Sung during the Korean War and their dissatisfaction with the purge of Yan'an people. With the permission of China and the Soviet Union, the reformist Yun Gong-chin informed the Soviet side through the embassy on 2 August that they were ready to launch an anti-Kim offensive. A week later, Lee Sang-jo told Soviet officials that they had agreed on several candidates to replace Kim Il Sung and that if the coup succeeded, they would exile Kim Il Sung overseas. On 9 August, Lee Sang-jo relayed to conspirators plan to the Soviet Union, proposing that Ch'oe Ch'angik be made chairman of the WPK Central Committee, Choe Yong-gon be appointed as the supreme commander of the military, while Kim Il Sung would remain as premier.

=== Kim Il Sung's counterplan ===
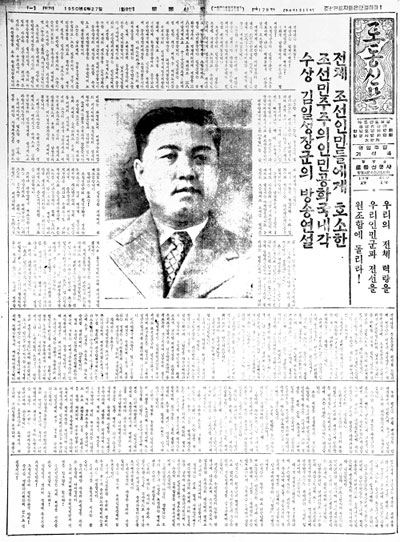
Since Kim Il Sung became supreme leader, the Rodong Sinmun, the official newspaper of the Workers' Party of Korea Central Committee, has continuously promoted him. The picture shows the Rodong Sinmun from 27 June 1950, with a speech by Kim Il Sung on the cover.

In reality, the news of the reformists' secret coup plot had already been leaked in July by Nam Il and Ri Ul-sol, the head of the Ministry of Internal Affairs' Security Bureau. After Kim Il Sung became aware of the plan upon his return from Moscow, he responded by delaying the plenum by almost a month. Minister of internal affairs Pang Hak-se, who was a Kim loyalist, mobilized the police to monitor Pyongyang. Kim Il Sung wrote in his memoir With the Century that Ri Ul-sol noticed that Ch'oe Ch'angik and Pak Chang-ok were "acting suspiciously and somewhat abnormal"; Nam Il also told Kim by telephone that Ch'oe and Park were "acting suspiciously". On 19 July, Kim Il Sung, who had secretly returned to North Korea, decided to postpone the Central Committee plenary session originally scheduled for 2 to 4 August to 30 and 31 August in order to gain more time. Subsequently, Kim Il Sung made lobbying arrangements, meeting with close advisors such as Nam Il, Pak Chong-ae, and Jong Il-ryong. Based on their suggestion that Kim accept the demands of the reformists, Kim Il Sung agreed to their proposal. He then met with members of the Central Committee and verbally promised to correct the wrongs, reduce the cult of personality, and reflect on his mistakes. Even more, he told Kim Tu-bong of the Yan'an faction that he was willing to resign if necessary for the benefit of the party.

Externally, Kim Il Sung frequently met with Soviet envoys, promising to "fully accept Moscow's criticisms," and accused the reformists of inciting discontent within the party as an anti-party act. Although the Soviet Union was dissatisfied that Kim Il Sung had not complied with the requirements of the 20th Congress of the CPSU regarding the fight against personality cults, given the unrest in Eastern Europe after the 20th Congress, such as the Poznan protests, Moscow did not want turmoil to occur in East Asia. Therefore, the Soviet Union ultimately decided to support Kim Il Sung. On 2 August, the Soviet Union conveyed a message through Ambassador Ivanov, instructing the Workers' Party to "bravely expose the errors in the work of the party leadership. correctly analyze the reasons for the discontent," and take "practical measures to make up for the deficiencies and consolidate the party's leadership." At the same time, the Soviet Union reminded Kim Il Sung not to punish those who opposed him. On 13 August, the Soviet Union further supported Kim Il Sung, stating in a letter to him that intra-party democracy should not be used as a tool to "harm, destroy and weaken" the party. With the support of the Soviet Union, Kim Il Sung first convened a meeting of the Central Standing Committee on 18 August, which was attended by Ch'oe Ch'angik and Kim Tu-bong. Kim Il Sung read aloud a letter from the Soviet Union to warn the reformists that Moscow had decided to support him.

Meanwhile, from 21 to 23 August, members of the Workers' Party discussed the problems existing in the party. Ch'oe Ch'angik pointed out that there was a cult of personality in the party, a lack of democracy in the party, and that cadres were not selected based on ability, but on their loyalty to the leader. Therefore, Ch'oe advocated removing Park Kim-cheol from his post and investigating Jong Il-ryong and Kim Chang-man. Park Kim-cheol and Kim Chang-man immediately refuted this, emphasizing that Choi's remarks were a direct opposition to Kim Il Sung and an attempt to create internal conflicts and weaken the party's strength. Kim Il Sung arranged for Pak Chong-ae and Pak Kim-chul to preside over a cadre meeting, acknowledging that there was indeed a problem of personality cult surrounding Kim Il Sung within the party, but that this phenomenon had not yet developed to a dangerous state, and that the party was taking remedial measures. At the same time, the two also revealed to the cadres that the Soviet Union would stand on their side. The day after the meeting, the Rodong Sinmun also published a commentary entitled “The Resurgence of the International Workers’ Movement and the Power of Proletarian Ideology,” pointing out that personality cult was worth criticizing, but it had to be carried out under the guidance of the Party Central Committee, otherwise it would be exploited by class enemies. In terms of personnel, Kim Il Sung recalled his confidant Bang Hak-se, who had just gone abroad, to come back to the country to arrange preventative measures; Kim Sung-hwa, the Minister of Construction, who was considered to be acting as a liaison for the reformists, was sent to study in the Soviet Union before the Central Committee plenary session.

In the days leading up to the Central Committee meeting, Kim Il Sung used bribery or kidnapping to keep members with unclear positions neutral. In addition, he sent police to monitor the actions of reformist members and interrogate their drivers and nannies. At the meeting, Kim Il Sung also made arrangements, deliberately separating reformist members and placing his confidants next to them to speak in order to suppress their power and opinions. However, the reformists did not make any special adjustments to the various arrangements made by Kim Il Sung after his return to the country, but waited and saw, which indirectly led to the subsequent defeat.

== August plenary session ==
The 3rd Congress of the Workers' Party of Korea held its August Central Committee plenary session from 30 to 31 August at the Pyongyang Art Theater. When the plenum opened on 30 August, the original agenda was for Kim Il Sung to first report on his work summary during his visit to Eastern European countries, followed by a report from Pak Kum-chol, vice chairman of the Central Committee, on improving the health care of the people in the country. Near the end of his speech, Kim Il Sung was prepared and changed the theme to cult of personality, but the focus was still on claiming that Pak Hon-yong was the one who was conducting the personality cult. He said that the issue of cult of personality previously existed in the WPK but had been nearly solved. As for his own problems, he glossed over them and said: "Personality cult is absolutely not generated from the essence of the socialist system, nor is it a weakness of socialism as the enemy asserts". His speech was followed by one by Party Secretary of North Hamgyong Kim Thae-gun, who praised WPK policy and attacked trade unions and the Ministry of Trade, which were led by anti-Kim figures, Ri Jong-ok, chairman of the State Planning Commission, also agreed with Kim Il Sung's remarks.

Soon after, the reformist members took the lead in speaking and began to act. The first to speak was Minister of Trade Yun Kong-hum, who said his speech "will be focused on the personality cult, which exists in our party, and its serious consequences". His speech, which was eventually interrupted, attacked Kim Il Sung for creating a "police regime", accused him of "flagrantly trampling upon democracy inside the Party and stifling criticism", which he said "completely contradict the party’s charter and the Leninist norms of party life". He criticized the Party's Propaganda and Agitation Department for suppressing views contrary to those of Kim Il Sung and recommended the WPK make a decision "on the ideology of the personality cult, the centre of which is Comrade Kim Il Sung". He criticized Kim Il Sung's cult of personality having reached an incurable level and believed that the chairman of the Workers' Party should not be an irresponsible person like Kim Il Sung. In addition, Yun suggested that the issue of Kim Il Sung's cult of personality be discussed by the party.

Yun's speech did not gain the approval of the committee members and instead attracted a lot of criticism. Kim Il Sung's supporters heckled and berated the speakers rendering them almost inaudible and destroying their ability to persuade members. Kim Il Sung's supporters accused the opposition of being "anti-Party". Kim Il Sung first accused him of slandering the party, and the other attendees asked him whether he was implying that the Workers' Party was a "fascist party". Kim Il Sung also neutralised the attack on him by promising to inaugurate changes and moderate the regime, promises which were never kept. Finally, Kim Il Sung said that there was no need to give the right to speak to anti-party members and counter-revolutionaries, so he moved that Yun should stop speaking immediately. The majority in the committee voted for the closure, with only seven members voting against. Ch'oe Ch'angik and Pak Ui-wan proposed revoking the decision on closure, which failed. Nam Il condemned Yun but proposed he should be allowed to finish his speech, which was also rejected. Seeing that he has no support, Yun left the hall and Kim declared a recess.

Rest of the day was spent with loyalists making speeches supporting Kim and decrying his enemies. After a brief recess, Nam Il, Finance Minister Ri Ju-yon, and Park Yong-guk, chairman of the Democratic Youth League of Korea, criticized Yun Gong-chin's remarks. Then, Ch'oe Ch'angik attempted to defend Yun and continued to target Kim Il Sung for concentrating the power of the party and the state in his own hands, as well as criticising the party line on industrialisation. questioning Kim's excessive development of heavy industry and opposing the use of economic aid from the Soviet Union for economic development rather than for improving people's livelihoods. However, he was silenced by Kim's supporters. Ch'oe's opinion was quickly opposed by Kim Il Sung, who countered that the Workers' Party could not live a precarious life on aid alone, and that only economic development could improve people's livelihoods. He also claimed that the people would not support Choi's statement. Kim Man-geum, chairman of South Pyongan Province, agreed with Kim Il Sung and advocated that Ch'oe Ch'angik and other anti-party groups be "all imprisoned." Seeing Ch'oe Ch'angik's failure, Suh Hwi, chairman of the General Federation of Trade Unions of Korea, then spoke. He expressed great dissatisfaction with the party's dominance over the trade unions and believed that since the number of trade union members was greater than that of the Workers' Party, the trade unions should be allowed to operate independently, which would be in the best interest of the trade unions. However, his proposal did not receive the support of the committee members. After that, the confrontational atmosphere at the meeting became more intense. Construction Minister Lee Pil-kyu and Pak Chang-ok were interrupted by shouts and boos when they spoke, and they could hardly finish their speeches. Then, Kim Chang-man, South Hamgyong Province Chairman Hyun Jung-min, and Choi Yong-gun criticized Suh Hwi and Lee Pil-kyu. Pak Chang-ok then wanted to speak, but he was unable to do so amidst a chorus of opposition.

Seeing that the situation was hopeless, the reformist members fled the meeting during lunch. Yun Gong-chin drove to the Soviet embassy to seek asylum, but no one answered the door. He then left the area and returned home. That evening, he met with Suh Hwi, Li Bikui and another Yan'an faction member, Jin Gang, and drove north. Along the way, they bribed officials to ensure they would not be arrested. The next day, they crossed the Yalu River by fishing boat to Dandong, China, and then to Beijing. The other reformists chose to remain in Korea. After Yun did not return, Kim took advantage of this situation by accusing him of violating WPK bylaws and proposing to expel him from the Party; only head of trade unions So Hwi voted against. The plenum also voted to adopt a resolution condemning the "factionalist conspiracy". On the second day of the meeting, August 31, all the reformist members had disappeared. Kim Il Sung listed those who had opposed him earlier as counter-revolutionaries and anti-party elements and dismissed them from all their posts. Among them, Yoon Gong-chin, Su Hwi, and Ri Pil-kyu lost their party membership. At the same time, the congress unanimously passed a resolution on "the factional and conspiratorial activities of comrades Ch'oe Ch'angik, Yoon Gong-chin, Su Hwi, Ri Pil-kyu, and Pak Chang-ok" and instructed the supervisory committee to investigate Ch'oe Ch'angik, Pak Chang-ok, and other relevant personnel. Thus, this coup d'état, launched by the reformists, lasted only two days from the start of the meeting to its official conclusion, with members either fleeing or being labeled as anti-party elements.

== Aftermath ==
=== Soviet–Chinese joint delegation ===
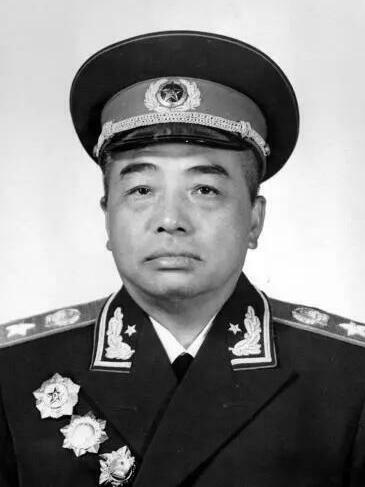
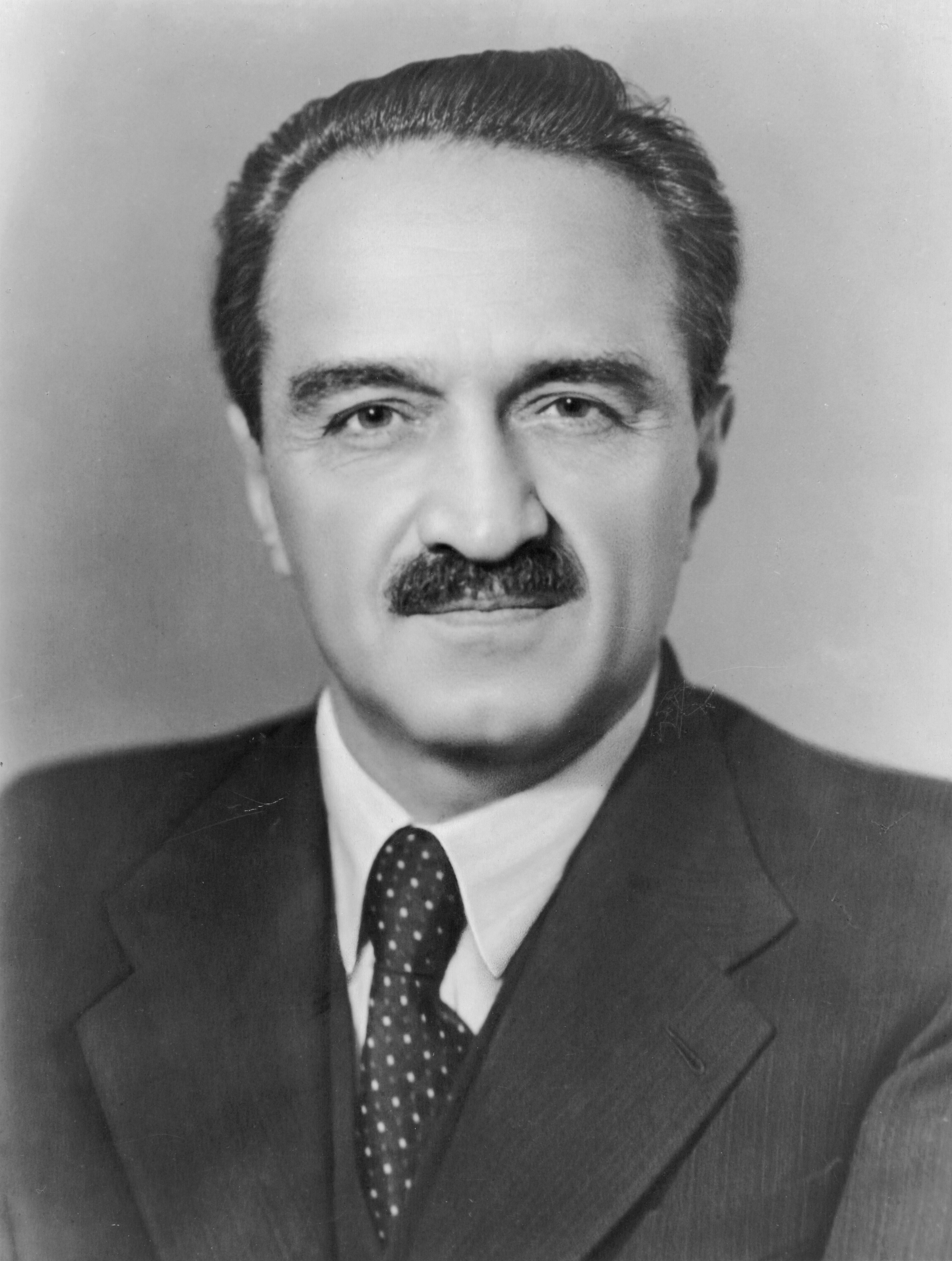
In September 1956, Peng Dehuai and Anastas Mikoyan formed a delegation to visit North Korea to understand the country's situation after the coup and, if necessary, to remove Kim Il Sung from his position as Chairman of the Workers' Party

According to the news from senior North Korean officials who had fled to China and staff of the Chinese and Soviet embassies, China and the Soviet Union realized that the reformists' coup attempt had failed and the political situation in North Korea attracted great attention from both countries. On 5 September, North Korean Ambassador to the Soviet Union, Lee Sang-jo, requested to meet with Soviet deputy foreign minister Nikolai Fedorenko and submitted his letter to Khrushchev. Lee Sang-jo said that Kim Il Sung was suppressing comrades who offered opinions and asked the Central Committee of the Communist Party of the Soviet Union to intervene in the matter. On 6 September, Boris Ponomarev, Minister of the Liaison Department of the Central Committee of the Communist Party of the Soviet Union, met with Lee Sang-jo. On 10 September, Ponomarev said during a meeting with Lee Sang-jo that the Soviet Union would not interfere in the internal affairs of the Workers' Party of Korea. In order to gain a deeper understanding of the current situation in the country, Mao Zedong and Anastas Mikoyan, the First Deputy Chairman of the Council of Ministers of the Soviet Union, agreed in September to send a joint delegation to visit North Korea. The two also advocated to put pressure on Kim Il Sung through the delegation and ask him to abandon the purge of reformist members. At the same time, they agreed that, if circumstances permitted, they would abolish Kim Il Sung's positions as Chairman of the Central Committee of the Chinese Communist Party and Premier of the Cabinet, and find a suitable replacement. However, Mao Zedong also believed that it would be "very difficult" for Kim Il Sung to step down. In addition, to prevent Pyongyang from having an excessive reaction, Mao summoned Choe Yong-gon and said that the delegation's visit was to "help you solve problems rather than sabotage them." He also explained: "The problems that have occurred in your country also affect China and the Soviet Union. Therefore, we cannot not interfere with these issues."

On 19 September, a delegation led by Peng Dehuai and Mikoyan arrived in North Korea. Kim Il Sung was very unhappy with the uninvited delegation and, unusually, refused to receive the envoys. On the same day, the delegation and Kim Il Sung held a four-hour meeting. During the meeting, the Chinese and Soviet envoys asked Kim Il Sung not to carry out a large-scale purge and to implement intra-party democracy in order to gain the trust of the masses in the party. At the same time, the delegation suggested that the Workers' Party convene another plenary session of the Central Committee to correct the mistakes made at the last plenary session. Kim Il Sung accepted most of the delegation's requests, but on the following conditions: Pak Chang-ok could not serve as the vice premier of the cabinet again, Ch'oe Ch'angik could not serve as a member of the Central Standing Committee again, and officials such as Suh Hwi who fled to China could have their party membership restored, but could not remain in the Central Committee of the Party. The delegation accepted this suggestion and recommended that Kim Il Sung convene a Central Committee plenary session in September to acknowledge his previous mistakes.

To explain his position to party members, Kim Il Sung held a meeting of the Standing Committee of the Central Committee before the Central Committee plenary session, and China and the Soviet Union were also invited to participate. At the beginning of the meeting, Kim reiterated that the reformists were wrong, but for the sake of party unity, he would forgive them. Mikoyan pointed out that the Workers' Party was wrong to deprive Yun Gong-chin of his right to speak at the previous Central Committee plenary session, and believed that the reformists fled because they were afraid of being arrested for expressing dissenting opinions. Therefore, the Workers' Party must give up pursuing the mistakes of its comrades and accept different opinions. Peng Dehuai then pointed out that the Workers' Party's punishment of the reformist members was "too hasty" and obviously represented that the party did not want to hear dissenting voices. Therefore, the Workers' Party should reflect on its actions at the Central Committee plenary session in September and publish the resolution in the newspapers.

On 23 September, a new Central Committee plenary session was held under Soviet and Chinese surveillance. In his opening address, Kim Il Sung admitted that the punishment of Choi Ik-chang and others was “somewhat hasty” and believed that they had not worked for foreign countries. Therefore, Kim announced the restoration of Ch'oe Ch'angik and Park Chang-ok's official positions, as well as the restoration of Yun Gong-chin, Su Hwi and Ri Pil-kyu's party membership. Kim then promised to form a party, implement intra-party democracy and educate the comrades who had made mistakes more patiently. After hearing Kim's speech, Han Sang-doo, Hyun Jung-min, Han Tae-chon, chairman of North Pyongan Province, and Ri Chung-won, an academician of the National Academy of Sciences, pointed out that Ch'oe Ch'angik and Pak Chang-ok were anti-party elements who lived corrupt lives under the banner of opposing personality cult, but they all agreed with the party's practice of restoring the party membership of the reformists. Finally, the Central Committee plenary session read out a resolution stating that the reformists had made serious mistakes “without a doubt” and that the party's previous decision to punish them was “somewhat simplistic.” However, for the sake of party unity, they would give them a chance to reform. Because the envoys were satisfied with Kim Il Sung's attitude of admitting his mistakes, the delegation did not depose Kim and returned home on 22 September.

=== Purge of opponents ===
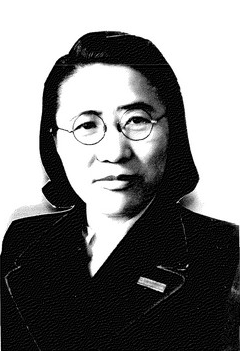
As a supporter of Kim Il Sung, Heo Jong-suk was one of the few non-guerrillas who were not purged.

Shortly after the Central Committee plenary session in August defeated his political enemies, Kim Il Sung began to deal with his opponents in order to eliminate the threat to his personal leadership. Among them, all reformists were stripped of their cadre rations and medical services, and their families were also punished and placed under police surveillance. Pak Chang-ok and Ch'oe Ch'angik, who were dismissed from their posts, were sent to work in a sawmill and a pig farm, respectively. At the same time, Kim Il Sung turned his attention to Yan'an faction officials. He subsequently declared that Ch'oe Ch'angik and Su Hwi were the masterminds behind the separatist and factional activities, and determined that the coup was the work of the Yan'an faction. To this end, he purged many Yan'an faction members from the Pyongyang City Party Committee. In addition, many cadres from the Ministry of Commerce, the Ministry of Construction and the Ministry of Building Materials were dismissed for their association with reformist members.

In September, with the arrival of the Sino-Soviet joint delegation, Kim Il Sung could only postpone the purge of the opponents and verbally agreed not to pursue the coup plotters any further. On 29 September, the Rodong Sinmun published an article stating that the party would educate the troublemakers within the party through "re-education, persuasion and explanation" to help them correct their mistakes Pak Chang-ok and Ch'oe Ch'angik were thus reinstated to their original positions, and Yoon Gong-chin, Su Hwi and Ri Pil-kyu also regained their party membership. At the same time, Kim Il Sung summoned Soviet representatives through Park Jong-ae to convey the message that the Workers' Party would definitely exonerate them. However, this phenomenon lasted for less than two months In November, taking advantage of the attention of China and the Soviet Union to the Polish-Hungarian conflict, Kim Il Sung quickly launched an unfinished purge. He first used the pretext of reissuing party cards to remove a considerable number of Yan'an faction members. Subsequently, Pak Chang-ok and Ch'oe Ch'angik were dismissed from their posts again and sent to concentration camps. At the same time, Hong Sun-hwan, vice chairman of the Pyongyang Municipal Party Committee, was expelled from the party and removed from his post for allegedly having close ties with reformist members, and the food rations for Yun Gong-chin's family were cut off by the Pyongyang authorities. This purge did not end until the spring of 1957, by which time the main political enemies had been killed.

Starting in the summer of 1957, Kim Il Sung launched a new purge that lasted for a year. This time, a total of 10,000 people were purged, of whom about 6,000 were executed and the remaining 4,000 were expelled from the party In addition to the remaining members of the Yan'an faction, the Soviet faction was also persecuted. Among them, Pak Chang-ok and Ch'oe Ch'angik were executed for assisting the United States and Japan in espionage missions; Kim Doo-bong mysteriously disappeared and was reported to have been killed in the same year; the principal of the party school, Ha Gap, committed suicide because he could not bear the repeated interrogations; former Minister of Communications Kim Chang-hye was branded a traitor and purged; the families of Seo Hwi and Yoon Gong-chin were executed for their association. At the same time, the Pyongyang City Party Committee was also purged: 20 people, including former Secretary-General Gong Bong-chol and Kim Won-seol, were executed, and another 15 were imprisoned for a long period of time. Han Bin, a member of the Central Committee of the Workers' Party of Korea, was first demoted to the National Library as its director, and later dismissed from all his posts. By the summer of 1958, apart from Kim Il Sung's confidants, the Yan'an faction and the Soviet faction had been almost completely wiped out.

In 1960, Kim Il Sung launched the final purge. He first executed 150 “traitors” within the party, including 45 members of the Soviet faction. Then, he purged more than 2,000 middle and lower-level cadres within the party on the grounds of ideological corruption. By this time, only Kim Il Sung's supporters, such as Nam Il, Kim Chang-bong, Pak Jong-ae, and Heo Jung-suk, remained in the Yan’an faction and the Soviet faction.

=== Kim Il Sung's consolidation power ===
Seat distribution of the 1st Politburo of the Workers' Party of Korea
1. Yan'an faction (46.1%)
2. Soviet faction (23.1%)
3. Guerrilla faction (15.4%)
4. Domestic faction (15.4%)

The open challenges posed by the Yan'an faction and the Soviet faction to Kim Il Sung made him realize that his power base was unstable. Therefore, while carrying out a major purge, he also strengthened his rule through various means. Kim Il Sung first eliminated those outside the political circle who were considered unreliable. The academic community became the first target, with Kim Il Sung University bearing the brunt: its Party Secretary Hong Rak-jung was executed in October 1956 for contacting members of the reformists, President Yu Sung-hun was imprisoned, and Song Kyun-chan, Dean of the Marxist–Leninist Academy, was stripped of his party membership. Many professors and students, including Kim Jong-do, the head of the History Department, were purged. At the same time, three thousand teachers in South Pyongan Province were dismissed for “political stance issues” Then, members of the military were implicated. Kim Chil-song, Commander of the Korean People's Army Navy, Pak Il-moo, Minister of Armor, and Pak Gil-nam, Chief Engineer, were arrested in 1957–1958 for allegedly having contact with Pak Chang-ok and Ch'oe Ch'angik, and their whereabouts are unknown. The judiciary was also persecuted at the same time, and its deputy minister, chief prosecutor, president of the Supreme Court and several directors were dismissed.

Afterward, Kim Il Sung turned his attention to the satellite parties in the country. In November 1958, Hong Ki-hwang and Kim Dal-hyeon, the leaders of the Korean Democratic Party and the Chondoist Chongu Party, were accused of being spies for the United States and Japan and were sentenced to death. In February 1959, the two parties were purged. After that, the two parties were greatly weakened. In the election in 1957, they won 22 seats in the Supreme People's Assembly out of 215 seats. However, in the by-election in 1959 and the subsequent elections, they won only 1 out of 56 seats and 8 out of 383 seats.

Civilians also became targets of Kim Il Sung's crackdown. In April 1957, the Supreme People's Assembly passed a special law creating the songbun system that divided citizens into three classes based on their birth status, including friendly forces, neutral forces, and hostile forces. Those classified as hostile forces, the lowest class, were not only subject to strict government surveillance, but also found it difficult to gain promotion opportunities in the officialdom and the military. This classification has been used ever since, and it is estimated that hostile forces account for 20% of the total population of North Korea. In addition, in order to achieve mutual surveillance, Kim Il Sung established the "Five-Household Responsibility System" in July 1958, in which each family was responsible for "ideological education and behavior between each other". Three months later, the Ministry of State Security launched a year-long manhunt, and people accused of having stayed with the US and South Korean troops during the Korean War faced re-education to death sentences, involving 100,000 people.

Distribution of seats in the 2nd Politburo of the Workers' Party of Korea
The Guerrilla Faction expanded significantly after the election of the 2nd Politburo, while the Yan'an Faction and the Soviet Faction shrank considerably.
1. Yan'an faction (6.30%)
2. Soviet faction (12.5%)
3. Guerrilla faction (68.8%)
4. No faction (12.5%)

At the same time, Kim Il Sung also implemented a more hardline Stalinist rule. He vigorously promoted collectivization, and by the end of 1959, 95.6% of families nationwide had joined the ranks of collectivized production, the highest in the world. On the other hand, he also worked hard to crack down on private enterprises. By 1958, all private enterprises in the country had been nationalized. On the other hand, Kim Il Sung emphasized nationalism even more after the coup. He repeatedly emphasized the virtue and purity of the Korean people through his mouthpiece, the Rodong Sinmun, and encouraged students to study Korean seriously and learn less Russian. He also brought up the crimes committed by the US military in the Korean War to unite the people. In order to weaken the Soviet Union's influence in the country, the Central Committee of the Workers’ Party issued a ban on Soviet drama in the autumn of 1956, and Russian was no longer a subject to be studied in universities. The number of times the Soviet Union was mentioned in official publications also decreased sharply.

Kim Il Sung also carried out a large intensification of his cult of personality. Since 1958, the propaganda organs have repeatedly asked artists to sing praises of the Party and Kim Il Sung, and to actively produce works to overthrow class enemies and reactionaries. Kim Il Sung's name and the Juche ideology he put forward appeared frequently in the Rodong Sinmun, and the media frequently reported on the unprecedented prosperity of the North Korean economy and attributed it to Kim Il Sung In 1958, the Workers' Party established "Study Rooms on the Revolutionary Activities of the Great Leader Kim Il Sung" throughout the country to allow the people to learn about Kim Il Sung's deeds. These study rooms were found in government agencies, factories, rural people's communes and schools. In North Pyongan Province alone, there were 863 Kim Il Sung study rooms. In 1959, the Memoirs of Participants in the Anti-Japanese Guerrilla Forces published by the Institute of Party History of the Workers’ Party of Korea claimed that Kim Il Sung had fought more than 100,000 battles during the 15-year anti-Japanese struggle and had never been defeated.

Kim Il Sung further strengthened his control over the government through elections. In April 1956, Kim Il Sung made significant adjustments in the election of the Central Committee. Of the 71 members of the Central Committee, 43 were newly elected, and only 28 were re-elected. Of the 45 alternate members of the Central Committee, 43 were newly elected, and only 2 were retained. In 1957, Kim Il Sung launched the first national election since the Korean War. This time, only 75 people were successfully re-elected out of 527 seats, and the rest were newcomers. In the second election of the Politburo of the Workers' Party in 1961, the guerrilla faction won 6 out of 11 seats, the Soviet faction won 2 seats (Nam Il and Park Jong-ae), the Yan'an faction won 1 seat (Kim Chang-bong), and the non-factional members replaced the domestic faction to win the remaining two seats. By this time, the entire Workers' Party had been controlled by Kim Il Sung.

Under these methods, Kim Il Sung had eliminated all threats by the early 1960s and consolidated his power. In addition, after eliminating Kim Do-man, Pak Kim-chul, Pak Yong-guk and others who were considered to have too much power in the Kapsan faction, which was considered an internal faction of the guerrilla faction, leading him to purge them in 1967. By this time, Kim had successfully grasped control of the party, the military and the government, thus allowing his dictatorial rule over North Korea and laying the foundation for the hereditary rule of the Kim family in the future.

=== Changes in relations with China and the Soviet Union ===
After the Korean War ended, North Korea adopted a pro-Soviet foreign policy. In September 1953, shortly after the war ended, the Soviet Union provided North Korea with 1 billion rubles in grant aid and extended the repayment period of the 298 million rubles loan from the war, and reduced the interest rate from 2% to 1%. In December 1955, Kim Il Sung even declared to the people that "loving the Soviet Union is loving North Korea." During this period, the relationship between North Korea and the Soviet Union was unprecedentedly friendly.

On the contrary, despite China providing 1.6 billion rubles in grant aid, waiving 1.45 billion yuan in loans during the war, and funding students to study abroad, North Korea adopted a dismissive attitude towards China. According to observations by the Soviet Ministry of Foreign Affairs, the living conditions of the China's People's Volunteer Army stationed near Pyongyang were very poor, and the North Korean leadership rarely visited the area. At the same time, North Korea denied the contributions of the People's Volunteer Army to the Korean War. In the war exhibition hall in Pyongyang, only one of the 12 exhibition halls was dedicated to the Volunteer Army, and the remaining exhibition halls explained that the combat operations of the Korean People's Army had nothing to do with the Volunteer Army. North Korea's actions aroused dissatisfaction from China. As a result, after China recalled its ambassador to Pyongyang in 1952, the Ministry of Foreign Affairs did not send a new ambassador until January 1955. On the other hand, at the reception held at the North Korean Embassy in Beijing, Premier Zhou Enlai, who was also the Minister of Foreign Affairs, “almost did not talk to the North Korean representatives”.

However, with the emergence of the coup, this situation gradually changed. In 1956, the first year after the coup, Kim Il Sung attributed the coup to the instigation of China and the Soviet Union. Therefore, he became hostile to both countries. North Korea first signed a treaty with the Soviet Union, stipulating that North Korean cadres with Soviet nationality could only choose one nationality, North Korea or the Soviet Union. In addition, North Korea greatly reduced the number of students going to the Soviet Union for study. Subsequently, only graduate students were allowed to study in the country. At the same time, North Korea tried to sow discord between China and the Soviet Union. The Ministry of Foreign Affairs continuously spread news that was unfavorable to China, such as the Beijing government's view that the Soviet Union had a wrong view of the Poznan incident and the Chinese vice foreign minister's private meeting with the ambassadors of Vietnam and Mongolia. On the other hand, North Korea also evaded China's requests, such as the restoration of food rations for the family of Yun Gong-chin. In this year, the relationship between North Korea and China and the Soviet Union was also not good.

In 1957, the Sino-Soviet split worsened, which made it necessary for China to win over North Korea's support. In mid-September, China invited North Korea to visit China. On October 25, Kim Il Sung sent a congratulatory telegram to Mao Zedong on the seventh anniversary of the People's Volunteer Army's stationing in North Korea, and relations between the two countries gradually warmed up. In 1958, Zhou Enlai decided to withdraw all the Volunteer Army stationed in North Korea. Since then, relations between the two sides have eased, and the friendly relations between China and North Korea have continued to improve in the following decades. To this day, North Korea remains China's most important ally, and the two countries have a direct military alliance. As for the Soviet Union, since the Soviet Union did not regard North Korea as an important ally, after the relations between the two countries deteriorated, the Soviet Union did not actively improve the relations between the two countries, which led to the estrangement between the two countries continuing until Leonid Brezhnev overthrew Nikita Khrushchev's rule in 1964, which was then improved. Nevertheless, there were still some economic exchanges between the two countries during this period. In March 1959, the Soviet Union and North Korea signed a new economic cooperation agreement, under which the Soviet Union provided North Korea with 500 million rubles worth of machinery and technical assistance to help build power plants, chemical plants and woolen mills, etc. In 1960, the Soviet Union also waived 760 million rubles of outstanding loans from North Korea.

== Reactions ==
=== North Korea ===
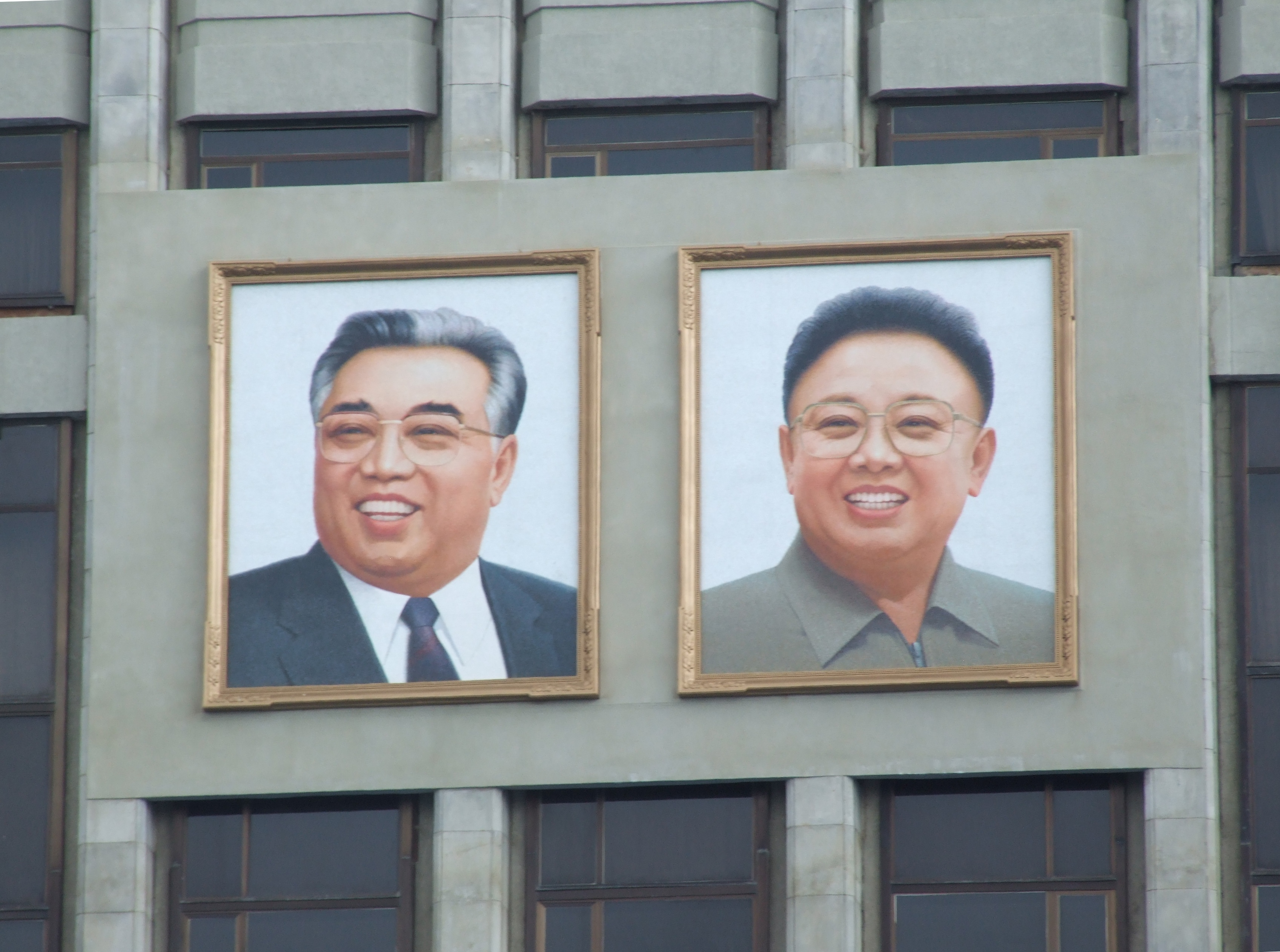
In 1967, after Kim Il Sung purged the other key figures within the guerrilla faction, no one in North Korea could threaten him, laying the foundation for the future hereditary rule of the Kim family.

Since the coup attempt, the North Korean government has remained silent on the matter. In North Korean histography, the attempt is known as the "Second Arduous March". On 9 September 1956, two weeks after the coup, the Rodong Sinmun reported on the Central Committee plenary session, but the newspaper made no mention of the reformists' actions. Starting in August 1957, the Rodong Sinmun began to criticize Ch'oe Ch'angik and others, calling them traitors. In the following years, they were also accused of being anti-party, counter-revolutionary, and enemies of the nation, but the newspaper still did not explain in detail how they betrayed the country. Nevertheless, this move successfully aroused public anger. In Cheonlima County, a group of factory workers declared that they would "throw the traitors into a 2,000-degree Celsius furnace to be executed."

Afterwards, the reformists' actions were characterized by Pyongyang as anti-party and counter-revolutionary. The official publications On the Workers' Party of Korea and A Brief Biography of Kim Il Sung state that the "anti-party and counter-revolutionary faction" headed by Ch'oe Ch'angik was a group that colluded with US imperialism and intended to subvert the party and the government. Taking advantage of the complex international and domestic situation and the numerous difficulties faced by the Workers' Party and the people, they deliberately "raised irrelevant and unreasonable questions to attack the party" during the meeting. But in the end, with the unanimous support of all members, the reactionaries suffered a heavy blow. The book Leading Korea for Seventy Years published by Foreign Languages Press in 2016 mentions this matter. It is unnamed and refers to the “anti-party and counter-revolutionary factional elements” who relied on external forces to “launch a frontal attack on the party and take advantage of the chaos to destroy and subvert the party and government”. However, the conspiracy was ultimately “severely defeated” and failed due to the opposition of the attendees. Kim Il Sung revealed in his autobiography that this coup made his “hair turn white” and made him determined to strictly prohibit factional activities, “and resolutely crush even the smallest phenomena”. Therefore, Pyongyang holds anti-factional propaganda activities around August every year.

=== China ===
After the coup, China showed considerable concern for the situation in North Korea and initially supported the reformists and provided them with protection. On 3 September 1956, North Korea demanded that China's Ministry of Foreign Affairs repatriate Suh Hwi, Yun Gong-chin and others who had fled to China, but this was refused by the Chinese side. Qiao Xiaoguang, then the Chinese Ambassador to Pyongyang, said: “These people are not ordinary border crossers, and it is impossible to forcibly repatriate them.” On 18 September 1956, Mao Zedong criticized Kim Il Sung's purge of opponents, saying that Kim Il Sung was following Stalin's ways.

From 1957 onwards, due to the easing of relations between China and North Korea and the influence of events such as the Hungarian Revolution, Mao Zedong and others changed their views on the events. They called the reformist members "anti-party factions" and later declared that they "did not want to interfere in the internal affairs of fraternal parties and fraternal countries". For former North Korean officials who fled to China, the Chinese side promised Pyongyang that they would not be given any official positions, but did not send them back to North Korea. After that, the official positions of the Chinese Communist Party and government never changed on the coup. Moreover, the Chinese government did not even want to have any dealings with the North Korean officials who fled. In June 1957, two North Korean embassy staff members who were in exile in Jilin Province asked Beijing whether they could participate in "certain organizational activities" in China, but were directly rejected by the Chinese side.

=== Soviet Union ===
Although the Soviet Union, like China, expressed concern about the development of the situation, their attitude was very cautious. Leonid Brezhnev, the secretary of the Central Committee of the Communist Party of the Soviet Union (who later became the general secretary of the Central Committee of the Communist Party of the Soviet Union), who was in charge of following up on the matter, never expressed his opinion; after visiting North Korea in September, he also did not object to the purge of Soviet personnel. However, the Soviet Union still protected the reformist members who fled to the area. Among them, Ambassador Lee Sang-jo to the Soviet Union, who was repeatedly summoned back to the country by Kim Il Sung, was able to stay in Moscow with the tacit consent of the Soviet side and was spared from being purged.At the same time, considering that many North Korean students in the Soviet Union and Eastern European countries had witnessed events such as the October events in Hungary and the economic reforms in Bulgaria, these students might be purged after returning home. Therefore, the Soviet Union allowed students who did not want to return home to stay and work in the area.

== See also ==
- History of North Korea
- Kapsan faction incident

== Sources ==
- Suh, Jae-Jung (2013). Origins of North Korea's Juche: Colonialism, War, and Development. Rowman & Littlefield. ISBN 9780739176580.
- Lankov, Andrei (2007). Crisis in North Korea: The Failure of De-Stalinization, 1956. University of Hawaii Press. ISBN 978-0-8248-3207-0.
- Nohlen, Dieter (2001). Elections in Asia and the Pacific : A Data Handbook. OUP Oxford. ISBN 9780199249596.
- Suh, Dae-Sook (1988). Kim Il Sung: The North Korean Leader. Columbia University Press. ISBN 9780231065733.
- Ministry of Unification (2003). "북한의 개인숭배 및 정치사회화의 효과에 대한 평가연구" [Evaluation Study on the Effects of Personality Cult and Political Socialization in North Korea].
- Myers, Brian (2011). The Cleanest Race: How North Koreans See Themselves and Why it Matters. Melville House Publishing. ISBN 978-1933633916.
- Tertitskiy, Fyodor (2024). Accidental Tyrant: The Live of Kim Il-sung. Oxford University Press. ISBN 9780197800881.
- Park, Geum-soon; Choi, Soo-nam; Ahn, Young (2016). 領導朝鮮七十年 [Seventy years of leadership over North Korea]. North Korea: Foreign Languages Publishing House. ISBN 978-9946-0-1455-5.
- Kim, Il Sung (1998). With the Century. Vol. 8. North Korea: Foreign Languages Publishing House. ISBN 978-9946-0-1455-5.
- Biography of Kim Il Sung. North Korea: Foreign Languages Publishing House. 2001.
- Jin, Zhihao (2016). 對於朝鮮勞動黨 [For the Workers' Party of Korea]. North Korea: Foreign Languages Publishing House. ISBN 978-9946-0-1467-8.
- Ma, Joseph M. (1982). "Soviet perceptions of North Korea". Asian Perspective. 6 (2).
- Lankov, Andrei (1999). "Kim Il Sung's Campaign against the Soviet Faction in Late 1955 and the Birth of Chuch'e". Korean Studies. 23 (1): 13–67.
- Lankov, Andrei (2002). "Kim Takes Control: The 'Great Purge' in North Korea, 1956–1960". Korean Studies. 26 (1): 87–119. doi:10.1353/ks.2002.0010. ISSN 1529-1529. S2CID 153356279.
- Shen, Zhihua (2009). "「唇齒相依」還是「政治聯姻」？——中朝同盟的建立及其延續(1946-1961)" ["Interdependent as lips and teeth" or "political marriage"? — The establishment and continuation of the Sino-North Korean alliance (1946-1961)]. Journal of the Institute of Modern History. 63 (1): 147–193.
- Shen, Zhihua (2010a). "金日成的大清洗" [Kim Il Sung's Great Purge]. World Expo. 7 (1): 79–81.
- Shen, Zhihua (2010b). "朝鮮勞動黨內權力鬥爭與中朝蘇三角關係" [Power struggles within the Workers' Party of Korea and the triangular relationship between China, North Korea, and the Soviet Union]. 21st Century. 4 (1): 32–43.
- Shen, Zhihua (2015a). "金日成走上權力頂峰：在黨內排除異己" [Kim Il Sung's Ascent to the Pinnacle of Power: eliminating dissidents within the party.]. 21st Century. 10 (1): 68–85.
- Shen, Zhihua (2015b). "金日成走上權力頂峰：「八月事件」序曲" [Kim Il Sung's Ascent to the Pinnacle of Power: The Prelude to the "August Coup"]. 21st Century. 12 (1): 84–96.
- Shen, Zhihua (2016a). "金日成走上權力頂峰：「八月事件」正劇" [Kim Il Sung's Ascent to the Pinnacle of Power: The "August Coup" drama]. 21st Century. 2 (1): 71–81.
- Shen, Zhihua (2016b). "金日成走上權力頂峰：應對中蘇共同干預" [Kim Il Sung's Ascent to the Pinnacle of Power: responding to joint Chinese and Soviet intervention]. 21st Century. 4 (1): 79–97.
- Shen, Zhihua (11 March 2013). "朝鲜清洗"延安派"揭秘" [Unveiling the Secrets of North Korea's Purge of the "Yan'an Faction"]. Sina History.
- "彭德怀质疑金日成：朝鲜战争究竟是谁发动的" [Peng Dehuai questions Kim Il Sung: Who really started the Korean War?]. Sohu. 21 February 2013.}
- "김일성 개인숭배운동" [Kim Il Sung personality cult]. Radio Free Asia. 9 January 2010. Archived from the original on 24 January 2018.
- "김일성 독재시대 연 '8월 종파사건' 54돌" [54th Anniversary of the ‘August Faction Incident,’ Which Triggered the Era of Kim Il Sung’s Dictatorship]. Radio Free Asia. 30 August 2010. Archived from the original on 26 January 2018.
- "金日成大清洗：71名老委员只剩28人" [Kim Il Sung's Great Purge: Only 28 of the 71 Veteran Committee Members Remain]. Paowang.com. 5 June 2007.
- "韓斌" [Han Bin]. Encyclopedia of Korean Culture. Archived from the original on 29 January 2018.
- "천도교청우당" [Cheondogyo Cheongu Party]. Encyclopedia of Korean Culture. Archived from the original on 29 January 2018.
- Tertitskiy, Fyodor (19 September 2017). "1959: Secret elections in North Korea". Daily NK.
