= Lee Sang-jo =

North Korean politician (1915–1996)

Lee Sang-jo 이상조
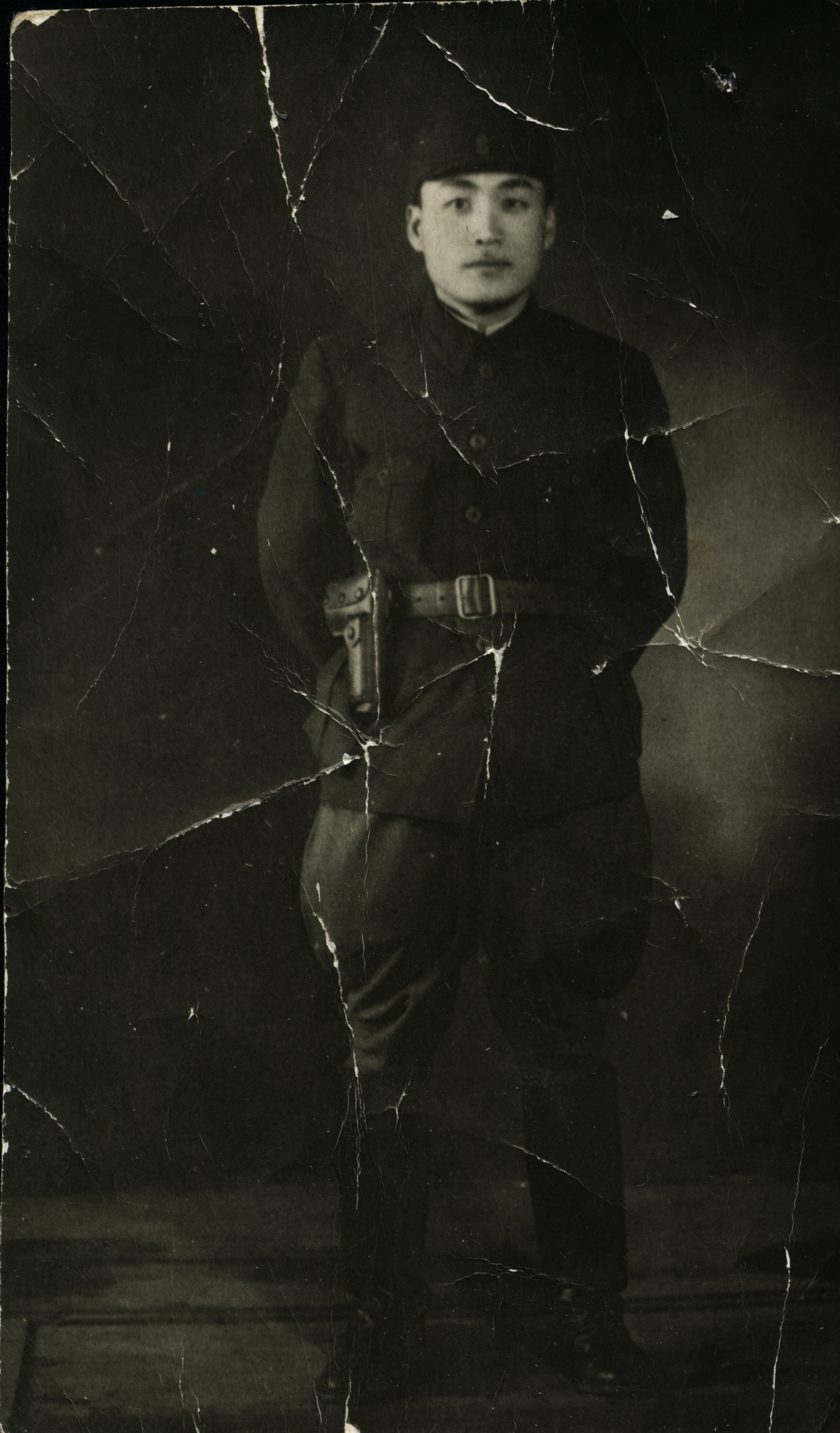

Personal details
- Born: 1915 Japanese Korea
- Died: 1996 (aged 80–81)
- Party: Workers' Party of Korea
- Occupation: Soldier, politician, government official

Military service
- Allegiance: North Korea
- Branch/service: Korean People's Army

Lee Sang-jo (Korean: 이상조; 1915–1996) was a politician and soldier from North Korea.

== Biography ==
Born in Dongnae District, South Gyeongsang Province, he acted with Choi Chang-ik at the Chinese Communist Party, and in 1941 went to Yan'an, the home of the Chinese Communist Party, and joined the Mao Zedong family. After entering Korea in 1945 following its liberation as a result of the surrender of Japan, he joined the communist armed forces. When the Korean War broke out, as the rank of Lieutenant General of the Korean People's Army, he served as the reconnaissance chief and vice chief of staff. At this time, it is said that Paik Sun-yup, who was the representative of the South Korean military, said "an unmade dog", and maintained a nasty expression even if flies sat on his face for more than an hour to show dignity. On 17 April 1953, he signed on behalf of North Korea the Agreement of Exchanging Sick and Wounded Prisoners of War at the North Korea Peace Museum in Panmunjom.

Afterward, Kim Il-sung's position was narrowed in the military dominated by the partisan faction, and he became a diplomat in 1955. Together, they sent a letter to the Soviet Union and China, informing them of the dictatorship of Kim Il-sung and exerting pressure on North Korea. Accordingly, Kim Il-sung canceled the schedule and returned quickly, countering the August faction incident coup attempt, in which Choe Chang-ik tried to defeat Kim Il-sung, and resulted in the expulsion of the Soviet-Korean faction and the Yan'an faction. In September 1989, he defected to South Korea and testified that Kim Il-sung led the invasion at the time of the Korean War under Stalin's approval.

== Bibliography ==
- Tertitskiy, Fyodor (14 June 2024). "Lee Sang-jo: An ambassador who challenged the leader". The Forgotten Political Elites of North Korea: Woe to the Vanquished. Abingdon-on-Thames: Routledge. pp. 180–198. ISBN 9781032745473.
