= Im Hwa =

North Korean poet and politician (1908–1953)

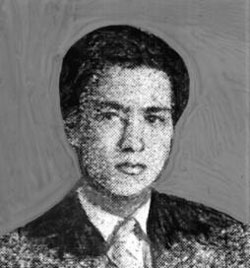

First Vice Minister of Cultural Propaganda of the North Korean People's Government
- In office 2 September 1950 – 9 February 1951

Personal details
- Born: October 13, 1908 Seoul, Korean Empire
- Died: August 6, 1953 (age 44) Pyongyang, North Korea
- Spouse(s): Ji Haryeon (second marriage), Lee Gwi-rye (divorced)
- Children: Im Hye-ran (daughter)
- Relatives: Im Jeong-suk (older sister), Im Gyo-sik (older brother)
- Education: Withdrew from Boseong High School, Gyeongseong, in 1925
- Nickname(s): Im Dada (林多多), Ssangsu Dae-in (雙樹臺人), Seong-a (星兒), Cheong-ro (靑爐), "Korea's Rudolph Valentino", "Arthur Rimbaud of Joseon"

Im In-sik (Korean: 임인식; Hanja: 林仁植), better known as Im Hwa (임화; 林和; [im.hwa]; October 13, 1908 – August 6, 1953), was a Korean poet, literary critic, and politician.

Born in Hanseongbu (modern-day Seoul), he became a key figure in proletarian literature during the Japanese colonial period, serving as General Secretary of the Korean Artists Proletarian Federation (KAPF). Im's work spanned across poetry, literary and film criticism, and acting. Im wrote nearly 80 poems and over 200 essays, playing a key role in modern Korean poetry, criticism, and literary studies, particularly in proletarian and leftist literature. Im is also known for short epic poetry (Danpyeon seosasi) and transplantation theory.

After the 1945 liberation of Korea from Japanese colonial rule, he became a prominent North Korean poet and politician. In 1953, as Kim Il-sung consolidated the power of his faction, Im Hwa was executed along with former members of the Workers' Party of South Korea on charges of being "American spies."

== Life ==
=== Early life and influences (1908–1945) ===
Im Hwa was born into a middle-class family in Seoul, Korean Empire. He attended Boseong High School, where he connected with figures such as Yi Kang-guk, a North Korean communist politician, and Yi Sang, a pioneering modernist poet. Im made his literary debut with six poems in The Dong-A Ilbo in 1924, during his senior year. However, due to the downfall of his family business, he left school the following year. Influenced by Russian literature, especially the works of Maxim Gorky and Leo Tolstoy, he joined KAPF in 1926, aligning himself with Korea's leftist literary circles. From 1930 to 1931, he briefly studied abroad in Japan, which further solidified his leftist ideology.

When he returned to Korea, Im served as General Secretary of KAPF in 1932, promoting literature as a vehicle for social change. As part of KAPF, alongside figures such as Han Sorya, Ch'oe Hae, Ri Ki-yong, and Cho Myung-hee, he championed a proletarian literary agenda that sought to use literature to advance class consciousness and revolutionary ideals. KAPF's dissolution in 1935 briefly led Im towards less politicized literature, but following Korea's liberation from Japan, he resumed leftist advocacy. Im's personal life included two marriages: his first to Gwi-rye Lee, with whom he had a daughter, and his second to novelist Ha-ryeon Ji.

=== Northern commitment and final years (1945–1953) ===
After liberation, Im became involved in efforts to revive the Communist Party of Korea and joined the Committee for the Preparation of Korean Independence (CPKI). Rising political tensions in the South and his health issues led Im to defect to North Korea in 1947, where he took part in early state-building and the establishment of North Korea. During his time in North Korea, Im served as the vice chairman of the Central Committee of the Joseon-Soviet Culture Association and contributed as the main writer for Joseon-Soviet Culture (Josso munhwa), reflecting his alignment with Soviet-North Korean cultural policies. However, as Kim Il Sung consolidated power in the early 1950s, political purges intensified, and Im became a target. He faced accusations of collaborating with the U.S. Counterintelligence Corps (CIC) during the mid-1940s, allegedly providing intelligence through his connections to figures like Yi Sung-yop. Im was executed in Pyongyang in 1953, on charges of espionage.

After his execution in 1953, Im's works were banned in both North and South Korea. In the North, his writings were erased due to accusations of espionage, while in the South, his Marxist ideology and defection made them targets of anti-communist censorship. The ban lasted until 1988. His legacy remains controversial, as a reactionary and bourgeois writer from a North Korean view and a communist writer from the perspective of South Korean historiography. Im's works, largely inaccessible for decades, reflect the unresolved tensions on the Korean peninsula surrounding colonial and ideological divisions.

=== Poetry ===
Im Hwa began his literary career experimenting with free-verse rhythms, avant-garde typography, and Dada aesthetics, as seen in "Earth and [Bacteria] (Jigu wa [bakteria])", "The Tank's Departure (Taengkeu ui chulbal)," and "Bright Soil" (Hyeokto), all written in 1927. These works reflect a transition from formal experimentation to an emerging political consciousness, blending disjointed imagery and unconventional structures with themes of class struggle and imperialist exploitation. While his early poetry explored personal and abstract rebellion, these poems marked the beginning of his alignment with the New Tendency (Sin gyeonghyangp) trends in literature, where collective struggles of the proletariat took precedence. By bridging avant-garde techniques with a growing emphasis on social critique, Im set the stage for his later commitment to proletarian literature.

In the 1930s, Im Hwa developed what he termed short epic poetry (Danpyeon seosasi) while he was involved with KAPF. This genre fused narrative and lyrical forms to capture the struggles of working-class life. For instance, "My Brother and a Brazier (Uri oppa wa hwaro, 1929)", connects personal emotion of the fictive content, in which a sister sends a letter to her activist brother, with the broader social reality. Other poems, like "Suni at the Crossroads (Negeori ui suni, 1929)" and "The Sea of Genkai (Hyeonhaetan, 1938)", similarly use intimate perspectives to explore themes of colonial resistance and social solidarity. Later, during the Korean War, Im wrote "Where Are You? (Neo eoneu gose itneunya, 1950)", a poem dedicated to his daughter, which North Korean authorities criticized for its allegedly defeatist tone.

=== Film and song ===
==== Proletarian film contributions ====
As a supporter of the proletarian movement, Im Hwa participated in the production of key proletarian-themed films that highlighted class struggles and social issues, including Vagabond (Yurang, 1928), A House (Hon-ga, 1929), and Underground Village (Jihachon, 1931). Im also starred in A House (1929) as an actor.

==== Cinematic criticism and history ====
Im's first critique, published in 1926, was one of the earliest critics focused on Joseon cinema. He typically critiqued foreign films, particularly American cinema, as being symbolic of capitalist values, and advocated for cinema as a tool for class struggle. In 1930, Im introduced Joseon cinema to Japanese audiences through an essay published in Shinko Eiga, a Japanese socialist film magazine. He later wrote Joseon Yeonghwa Baldalsosa (Yeonghwa baldalseosa, A Short History of the Development of Joseon Cinema) in 1941, which is regarded as the first official historical documentation of Korean cinema.

==== Songwriting ====
Im wrote the lyrics for "People's Struggle Song (Inmin hangjaengga)", composed by North Korean composer Kim, Soon-nam in 1946. This song became popular among the Korean People's Army and partisan fighters during the Korean War.

=== Cultural criticism ===
Im Hwa's critical essays reflect his belief in literature as a means of social engagement. In "The Division and Development (Bunhwa wa jeongae, 1927)", he critiques anarchism, calling it aristocratic and insufficiently scientific. Im's 1929 essay, "The Eyes of the Proletarian Vanguard (Musangyegeup jeonwi ui nun)", advocates social realism, urging writers to prioritize class solidarity. In 1930, he published "The Immediate Central Task of the Chosun Proletarian Arts Movement (Joseon pro yesul undong ui dangmyeon ui jungsimjeok immu)" in Jungoe Ilbo, advocating for the "Bolshevization" of literature and for stronger connections among workers, peasants, and intellectuals within a global context. His later work, "The Logic of Literature (Munhak ui nonli, 1940)" further situates literature within a Marxist framework, linking it explicitly to class struggle and introducing his concept of "transplanted literature," which would shape his later theory of cultural adaptation in transplantation.

As for cinema, Im Hwa wrote works on film theory and criticism in the early 1940s. His works include "Outline of the Development of Korean Film History (Joseon yeonghwa baldalsa, 1941)", "Theory of Korean Film (Joseon yeonghwaron, 1941)", and "Drama and Documentation in Film (Yeonghwa ui geukseong gwa girokseong, 1942)". These works examine the history of Korean cinema and discuss films such as Blessed Land (Bokji manri, 1941).

=== Transplantation theory in Korean arts and cinema ===
Im Hwa's transplantation theory (isik) provides a framework for understanding how Korean literature, arts, and cinema incorporated foreign influences in their early development while retaining a distinct identity. Rather than viewing cultural adaptation as a loss of identity, Im proposed transplantation as a dynamic process, integrating foreign elements into a Korean context to create something uniquely Korean. This perspective challenged rigid ideas of cultural purity, which were advocated by proponents of national literature who criticized the theory as compromising Korean identity. Nevertheless, its value lies in its role as a resisting discourse against colonial culture, offering a way to assert a distinct Korean cultural identity within the influences of colonial and global powers.

==== Transplantation in literature and arts ====
For literature, Im viewed transplantation as a pathway from foreign genres—primarily Western, mediated through Japan—to a Korean form. His works like An Introduction to the Theory of New Korean Literary History (Joseon sinmunhaksa nonseoseol, 1935), and Outline of New Korean Literary History (Gaeseol joseon sinmunhaksa, 1940) demonstrate this trajectory, noting early adaptations by writers like Yi In-jik and Yi Kwang-su as the foundation of Korean literary modernity. He proposed that by reframing external influences, Korea could assert an autonomous cultural identity even within a colonial context.

==== Transplantation in cinema ====
With the formation of the state-run Joseon Motion Picture Corporation in 1942, Im extended his transplantation theory to cinema. He argued that Korean cinema could evolve from its foreign origins as a cultural import by selectively adapting foreign influences, allowing it to cultivate an identity within the constraints of colonial oversight. As he wrote, "Joseon cinema, like all other forms of modern culture, is a kind of foreign culture that had been imported," underscoring his view of cinema as both foreign in origin and capable of becoming Korean in expression.

==== Discussions ====
Although some scholars recognize Im Hwa's emphasis on subjectivity and his attempt to define a modern Korean literary framework, Im's singular approach in his transplantation theory has often been a subject of criticism. In 1970, critiques of Im Hwa's theory began influencing Korean literature and history studies. Literary scholars Kim, Yunsik and Kim, Hyun, in A History of Korean Literature (Hanguk munhaksa, 1973), challenged Im's transplantation theory for overlooking the continuity of tradition in Korean literary history, arguing that modern Korean literature evolved organically from traditional narrative structures. Similarly, literary historian Jo, Dong-il, in "A Study on the Formation Process of Modern Literature (Geundae munhak hyeongseong gwajeongnon yeonggusa, 1983)", criticized Im's theory as a "combination of colonial and materialist historiography," asserting that modern Korean novels inherited traditional narrative frameworks. In contrast, literary critic Ku, Jung-seo and theorist Shin, Seung-yeop, in "The Dialectics of Transplantation and Creation (isik gwa changjo ui byeonjeungbeop, 1991)", argued that Im's historiography emphasized subjectivity and sought to establish a complete modern literature in Korea, moving beyond the limitations of the transplantation stage.

=== Im Hwa Literary and Arts Award ===
The Im Hwa Literary and Arts Award, established by the Im Hwa Literary and Arts Award Committee and Somyung Publishing, honors Im Hwa's literary achievements. It has been awarded annually since 2009 to works advancing Korean literature and criticism.

== Works in Korean (Partial) ==
=== Poetry ===
- Earth and Bacteria (Jiguwa bakteria, 1927)
- The Tank's Departure (Taengkeuui chulbal, 1927)
- Bright Soil (Hyeokto, 1927)
- Snow (Seol, 1927)
- A Painter's Poem (Hwaga-ui si, 1927)
- My Brother and a Brazier (Uri oppawa hwa-ro, 1929)
- Suni at the Crossroads (Naegeoriui Suni, 1929)
- The Sea of Genkai (Hyeonhaetan, 1938)
- Where Are You? (Neo eoneu gose ittneunya, 1950)

=== Criticism ===
- The Spirit of Korean Criticism (Joseonjeok bipyeongui jeongsin, 1933)
- The Realistic Structure of Romantic Spirit (Nangmanjeok jeongsinui hyeonsiljeok gujo, 1934)
- An Introduction to the Theory of New Korean Literary History (Joseon sinmunhaksa nonseoseol, 1935)
- Reconstruction of the Subject and the World of Literature (Juche-ui jaegeon-gwa munhak-ui segye, 1937)
- On Serious Novels (Bongyeok sosollon, 1938)
- Outline of New Korean Literary History (Gyesol joseon sinmunhaksa, 1939)
- The Method of New Literary History (Sinmunhaksa-ui bangbeop, 1940)
- A Short History of the Development of Joseon Cinema (Joseon yeonghwa baldal sosaa, 1941)
- Theory of Korean Film (Joseon yeonghwaron, 1941)
- Drama and Documentation in Film (Yeonghwa-ui geukseong-gwa girokseong, 1942)
