= Kim Yunsik =

South Korean literary scholar (1936–2018)

- 김윤식
- Born: 1936; Gyeongsangnam-do
- Died: 2018 (aged 81–82)
- Occupations: Professor in Korean Literature, translator, critic

Academic background
- Education: Seoul National University

Kim Yunsik (Korean: 김윤식 IPA: [kim.jun.ɕik̚]; Hanja: 金允植; 1936–2018) was a South Korean professor, literary critic, and writer. He taught Korean literature at Seoul National University from 1968 to 2001. He wrote more than 200 books on Korean literature, including A Research on History of Modern Korean Literary Criticism (한국근대문예비평사연구, 1973),Yi Gwangsu and His Age I-III (이광수와 그의 시대 1–3, 1986), and Kim Yunsik’s Notes on Criticism (김윤식의 비평수첩, 2004). With regard to Kim Yunsik's many achievements, young Korean literature scholars say the following: "It is totally impossible to evade Kim Yunsik’s shadow".

== Life ==
Professor Kim Yunsik was born in Jinyeong-eup, Gyeongsangnam-do, South Korea on August 10, 1936. He was born into a farmer's family and had three elder sisters. He studied Korean language and literature at Seoul National University and earned his master's and doctoral degrees there between 1960 and 1976. He also studied at Tokyo University in 1970. In 1978, he was a visiting professor at the University of Iowa. In 1980, he was a visiting researcher in the department of comparative literature at Tokyo University. Since his debut as a literary critic in 1962, he continued to write monthly reviews on recent novels, which were published by literary magazines for more than three decades. He died due to a chronic illness at the age of 82 in 2018.

== Career ==
Ever since his first publication, The Night Sea (밤바다, 1964), he has published 148 books, 41 co-authored books, 6 translations of foreign texts, and 9 coursebooks. Kim Yunsik's works encompassing a wide range of genres like scholarly work, criticism, prose, and translation, are categorized into the following four main categories: (i) on-site criticism, (ii) author criticism, (iii) studies in literary history and thoughts, and (iv) travelogues, art philosophy, and autobiographical writings.

On-site criticism is defined as the critique of contemporary, newly produced literature with the purpose of gaining a grasp of the most recent version of the spirit of the age. On-site criticism (현장비평) includes publications of Kim Yunsik's monthly reviews like The Width and Depth of Our Literature (우리 문학의 넓이와 깊이, 1979) and Kim Yunsik’s On-site Novel Criticism (김윤식의 소설현장비평, 1997). In contrast, author criticism takes a unique approach to writers. It delves into the societal context and psychology of authors. It reads like a novel, with the described writer as the protagonist. Kim's criticisms like Yi Gwangsu and His Age I-III and Studies of Yeom Sang-seob belong to author criticism. Next, his works on the history of Korean literature include History of Modern Korean Novels and Studies in Philosophy of Modern Korean Literature. These books seek to redefine the concept of modernity in Korean literature by covering forbidden documents and challenging previous definitions of modern Korean literature. Finally, The Japan that I Read and Met (내가 읽고 만난 일본, 2012) is classified as the fourth category, i.e., travelogues and autobiographical writings. It is a travelogue that covers the life of Yi Gwangsu as a writer and the reason for his turn from an independence activist to a pro-Japanese figure.

=== History of modern Korean literature ===
Kim Yunsik's work on modern Korean literature A Research on History of Modern Korean Literary Criticism is originally based on his doctoral dissertation. His doctoral research uncovered Korean Artist Proletarian Federation (KAPF), an association of progressive Korean authors. He delved into KAPF's three thousand forbidden works, which might otherwise have been forgotten due to censorship. Kim later confessed that his research on KAPF resulted in several interrogation and blackmailing by the government. His effort made these resources available to researchers in Korean literature. Not only did he reveal the existence of this radical literary campaign, but he also associated the KAPF movement with Korean modernity. KAPF was modern in that it pursued Marxian modernity, but its modernity was distinct because of the special context of Korea under Japanese rule. In short, in A Research on History of Modern Korean Literary Criticism, he saw KAPF as the starting point of modern Korean literature, calling attention to the tension between Western utopianism and colonial expansionism.

The History of Korean Literature (한국문학사, 1973), which he co-authored with Kim Hyun, is Kim Yunsik's other work on Korean literary history. This book is a struggle to overcome distortion in Korean history that was brought about by Japanese colonialism. The History of Korean Literature seeks to reconstruct Korean history by focusing on historical movements toward civil society before and after colonialism. It sees the Chosun dynasty in the eighteenth century, governed by King Yeongjo and Jeongjo, as the starting point of Korean modernity. Previously, scholars considered Yi Gwang-su and Choi Nam-sun as the precursors of modern Korean literature. Kim Hyun and Kim Yunsik's challenge against the previous definition of Korean modernity sparked scholarly debate on the periodization of Korean modernity from 1960-70s onward. Moreover, The History of Korean Literature was a turning point in the periodization of Korean literature in that it deconstructed the previously established hypothesis on when modern Korean literature began.

=== Author criticism ===
The book Yi Gwangsu and His Times I-III (이광수와 그의 시대, 1986) shows Kim's author criticism. The book is about his field trip to Japan in search of resources for a deeper understanding of Yi Gwangsu's life and its historical implications. It has a unique style by connecting the author's self-consciousness as an orphan to the sense of national orphanhood in Korea under Japanese rule. It suggests that the author's personal life was inseparable from the colonial situation.

Kim's works appear highly political due to his attachment to KAPF's leftist movement or his tension with the Park Chung-hee government. However, in an interview with Dong-A Daily, he denied any partiality to specific schools or ideologies such as Marxism. He stated that he believed human reason was the only power capable of changing the world.

Kim was well-versed in European philosophy and literary tradition, so he often discussed Dostoevskii or Hegel in his works. His references to Western scholars were methods to answer philosophical questions in literature. Kim's knowledge that surpassed Korean literature and his contribution to the studies of Korean literature has a lasting influence. In 2022, Seoul National University created the Kim Yunsik Scholar Award to commemorate Kim's scholarly contribution. His pupils include novelists like Gwon Yeoseon and Kim Takhwan and critics like Seo Yeongchae, Jeong Hong-su, Gwon Seongwu, Ryu Boseon, and Shin Sujeong.

== Controversy ==
In 1999, a Ph.D. student named Lee Myeongwon criticized Kim Yunsik's plagiarism, saying that he quoted a substantial amount of Japanese critic Garatani Gojin's work without proper citation. This accusation became an issue among scholars two years after Lee Myeongwon published his book, which made him quit graduate school as his professors got hostile to him. When Lee left the University of Seoul without finishing his degree, the public started to notice the existence of an authoritarian system based on school ties. Kim was not only a prominent scholar but also had many colleagues and pupils that graduated from Seoul National University, many of whom were teaching in different universities. A novelist named Lee Jeong-seo wrote this incident into a novel later, titled A Dangerous Impression (당신들의 감동은 위험하다, 2014). In his interview right before retirement, Kim Yunsik conceded that Lee's accusation was appropriate. Kim added that such mistakes that demand consistent correction would be common in his works.

== Selected publications ==
=== Authored books ===
- The History of Korean Literature (한국문학사, co-authored with Kim Hyun,1973)
- A Research on History of Modern Korean Literary Criticism (한국근대문예비평사연구, 1973)
- Yi Gwangsu and His Age, I-III (이광수와 그의 시대1-3, 1986)
- Studies of Yi Sang (이상 연구, 1987)
- Studies of Yeom Sang-seob (염상섭 연구, 1987)
- History of Modern Korean Novels (한국근대소설사연구, 1986)
- Studies in Philosophy of Modern Korean Literature I-II (한국근대문학사상연구1-2, 1984)
- The Japan that I Read and Met (내가 읽고 만난 일본, 2012)

=== Selected translations ===
- Benedict, Ruth. The Chrysanthemum and the Sword: Patterns of Japanese Culture, (국화와 칼, 1974)
- Lukacs, Georg. The Theory of the Novel, (소설의 이론, 1977)

== Awards ==
- 2016 Order of Cultural Merit (Silver Certificate) 은관문화훈장
- 2014 1st Lee Seunghyu Culture Award for Literature 제1회 이승휴문화상 문학부문
- 2011 20th Sudang Award for Humanities and Society 제20회 수당상 인문사회부문
- 2008 9th Cheongma Literary Award 제9회 청마문학상
- 2003 7th Manhae Prize for Academic Excellence 제 7회 만해상 학술부문
- 2002 10th Daesan Literary Awards for Literary Criticism 제10회 대산문학상 평론부문
- 2001 Hwangjo Geunjeong Medal 황조근정훈장
- 1994 11th Yosan Literary Award 제11회 요산문학상
- 1993 3rd Pyeonwoon Literary Award for Criticism 제3회 평운문학상
- 1991 2nd Palbong Award for Literary Criticism 제2회 팔봉비평문학상
- 1989 1st Gimhwantae Prize in Critique Literature 제1회 김환태문학평론상
- 1987 1st Republic of Korea Literary Award 제1회 대한민국문학상
- 1987 Korean Literary Writer Award 한국문학 작가상
