= Sol Jong-sik =

Korean writer and literary critic (1912–1953)

- Born: 18 September 1912; Dancheon, Korea, Empire of Japan
- Died: 30 August 1953 (aged 40)
- Occupations: Poet, playwright, novelist

Academic background
- Education: Yeonhee College, Mount Union College (B.A. in English Literature), Columbia University (M.A. in Philosophy)

Sol Jong-sik (Korean: 설정식; Hanja: 薛貞植; RR: Seol Jeongsik; 18 September 1912 – 30 August 1953) was a Korean poet, novelist, translator, literary scholar, and politician. He graduated from Yeonhee College, before achieving a B.A. in English Literature from Mount Union College, Ohio, and a master's degree in philosophy from Columbia University. He returned to Korea and became a published poet, and then worked with the U.S. military government and the left-wing Korean Writers Alliance after the liberation. He defected to North Korea during the Korean War but was executed in 1953 during the Namrodang Purge on charges of espionage. He is considered one of the most influential political poets of the liberation period of South Korea.

== Biography ==
Sol Jong-sik was born in Dancheon, Hamgyeongnam-do on 18 September 1912. When he was eight years old, his family moved to Seoul and he entered Seoul Gyodong Public Primary school. In his third year, Sol founded a reading club called the Flower Garden Club (꽃밭사) with Yoon Seokjoong, who later became a famous Korean children's book writer. Together, they created a school magazine called Joy (기븜) by copying poems that were published in Bang Jeong-hwan's children's literary journal at the time. He graduated from primary school in 1929 and entered Seoul Public Agricultural School, although he was expelled two years later for his involvement with the Gwangju Student Independence Movement. He moved to China in order to continue his studies but had to return to Korea in 1931 after the Wanpaoshan Incident.

Sol started his creative writing career at this time and wrote his first play, Where is China Going? (중국은 어디로), based on his experiences in China. It won first place in the JoongAng Ilbo newspaper's writing competition, and his other essays and poems also received many student awards. It was at this time that he entered the literary world by publishing Song on the Street (거리에서 들려주는 노래), his first poetry collection in 1932. However, he did not fully engage with his writing career, choosing instead to enter Yeonhee College in 1933. In 1935, he took a leave of absence from school due to health issues and transferred to a commercial school in Japan. After graduating in March 1936, he returned to Korea and married Kim Jeungyeon, a graduate of Sookmyung School. Sol went back to Yeonhee College and entered the liberal arts department. After graduating, he went to study in the United States in 1937, first at Mount Union College, majoring in English literature, then at Columbia University where he studied philosophy. In 1940, he returned to Korea because of his parents' failing health. Unable to find a job, he spent his days helping his brother on the family farm and orchard.

After the liberation of Korea from Japanese colonial rule, Sol started working at the U.S. military's public information office in November 1945, where he became the Director-General of Public Opinion thanks to his English language skills. He joined the Communist Party of Korea at this time, mostly due to the U.S. government's lack of interest in Korea as nothing more than a military base. He also worked as a poet and resumed his literary activities, joining the Joseon Literature Construction Headquarters in August 1945 and was later in charge of the Foreign Literature Department of the Korean Writers Alliance. In November 1948, he became editor of the English-language newspaper The Seoul Times (서울 타임즈), but when The Seoul Times was abolished and arrest warrants were issued for many of its writers, he joined the Press Federation in December 1949 to avoid getting arrested. When the Korean War broke out in 1950, he defected to the north and entered the Cultural Training Bureau of the Korean People's Army Front Command. When his health failed, he was admitted to hospital where he wrote a long 400-line poem, which was later translated by Tibor Méray, a Hungarian war reporter he met while interpreting at the ceasefire talks at the Kaesong Armistice in 1951. With the start of the Namrodang Purge in 1953, Sol was arrested and charged with anti-state espionage by the military court of North Korea's Supreme Court, and sentenced to death.

== Works ==
Sol Jong-sik's literary debut was with his one and only play, Where is China Going?. The play was based on his experiences in China and won first prize in the JoongAng Ilbo's writing contest in January 1932. In March of the same year, Sol published his first poems, Song on the Street and A Song in a New Bowl (새 그릇에 담은 노래), which won third and fourth place respectively in the student poetry contest run by literary magazine Donggwang (동광). He even won first place in a national essay writing contest. Spurred on by this literary success, Sol continued to write and publish his first full-length novel Short Hair in the Chosun Ilbo newspaper along with other poems in the literary magazines Donggwang and Shindongah (신동아).

At Columbia University, Sol studied Shakespeare for two years, which laid the groundwork for his Shakespeare translations. After graduation, however, Sol could not join the Korean domestic literary circle due to its strong anti-American bias, nor did he wish to collaborate with any Japanese literary groups. During this time, Sol did not pursue many literary activities except for translating a Hemingway novel and another article on Thomas Woolf in the literary journal Humanities Review (인문평론).

Sol's early poems, which were published in Donggwang and Shindongah in the 1930s, seem to have been influenced by the realistic and critical trends of Korea Artista Proleta Federacio (KAPF) literature but also incorporated many nature-friendly and lyrical elements. However, during the liberation period, his poems broke away from this lyricism, and his critical and political tone gradually intensified. As a member of the Korean Writers Alliance, Sol often recited his poetry at military events and competitions, taking a clear political stance.

Sol also wrote novels, and his novels generally unraveled autobiographical experiences. Youth (청춘), which was serialized in the Hansung Ilbo from 3 May to 16 October 1946, was based on his years studying abroad in China, while Francis Duset (프란시스 두셋), which was serialized in the Dong-A Ilbo between 13 and 22 December of that year, was based on his experiences studying in the United States. In 1948, his novel The Liberation (해방) was serialized in the New Generation (January–May) but was discontinued due to personal circumstances. The New Generation was a separate magazine published by The Seoul Times, where Sol was the main writer and editor-in-chief until 1949 when he had to resign after being accused of politically aligning the newspaper with the left. The following year, The Seoul Times was discontinued after many reporters and chief writers were arrested.

Sol's poetry collections solidified his literary position and caught the attention of the literary world, with his first collection of poems, The Bell (종), published in 1947. His second and third collections of poems, entitled Grapes (포도) and The Wrath of the Gods (제신의 분노) respectively, were published in 1948, in response to the liberation of Korea.

His first collection of poems, The Bell, consists of 28 poems in four parts. Of these, "Poetry" (시), "Cemetery" (묘지), "Spring Water" (샘물), and "Autumn" (가을) were written in the 1930s, while the remaining 24 were written after Korea's liberation from Japanese colonialism. Among the poems written immediately after liberation, The Bell, one of his most famous works, speaks about how a bell must keep watch during the night, groaning under violence and power; and that the cry of the nation lies in the cry of the bells. His poems project the atmosphere of the liberation linked to the task of establishing a national state and Sol's own sense of purpose in contributing to the task of nation-building.

When The Wrath of the Gods was published in November 1949, it was immediately banned. Sol was threatened with arrest, which led him to join the Press Federation to avoid arrest. Toward the end of his literary career, Sol devoted himself to translating Shakespeare's works and published a version of Hamlet translated into Korean.

== Literary criticism ==
Many critics view Sol Jong-sik as a crucial poet of influence who must be mentioned in discussions of the Liberation Period. Early research on Sol's works was focused on the author's individual life, and positioning Sol's poetry in the context of Korean literary history. However, recent discussions of Sol have expanded to include his novels, and also Sol as a translator of English literature and representative of western thoughts.

Another point of interest was Sol's "Janus-like two sides" during the Libration Period. The clash of identity between a U.S. military official and a member of the Communist Party clearly shows the duality he faces in life which is also reflected in his works. One of the reasons for Sol's such ideological identity lay in the South Korean political climate of the times, where intellectuals were almost forced to choose between two parties while those who refused to identify with one were stigmatized as opportunists.

Most researchers, led by Kim Yoonsik's primary research, agree that Sol Jong-sik's poetry is characterized by a particular Messianism and a "prophetic voice" that is portrayed through his poetic narrative and distinctive tone. This prophetic voice is evident in poems such as "New Every Day" [우일신], "Truth" [진리], and "The Wrath of the Gods" [제신의 분노], which harness their poetic cries to awaken its readers to the possibility of a brighter future by criticizing the illegality of the existing order. The poem "The Wrath of the Gods" is a stern rebuke of a group of people who betray their own people and sell their brothers to another tribe, using religious allegories borrowed from the Old Testament. Here, the Korean people are equated to the Israelites with their Messianic ideology. Critics have called this aspect of Sol's poetry, a "prophetic voice," as prophets are people who deliver God's message to the entire nation. The content of the message is often a promise of divine intervention or a warning of impending judgment or catastrophe. A prophet can intervene in political events and can transform societies via his prophecies. Sol's poetry reveals the new narrative characteristic of the liberation period through the passionate and rhythmic voice of the "prophet."

Critics have noted that although epic poetry praising the victories of a national hero does not exist in traditional Korean poetry, examples of Korean national poetry narrating the anger of a hero's failure and the country's lament over injustice can be found throughout Sol's poetry. These literary criticisms and insights led to a spate of studies probing "the prophetic voice" and "the prophetic poetry" of Sol Jong-sik.

== Bibliography ==
=== Poetry Collections ===
The Bell (종, 1947)

Grapes (포도, 1948)

The Wrath of the Gods (제신의 분노, 1948)

=== Novels ===
Short Hair (단발, 1946)

Youth (청춘, 1946)

Francis Duset (프란시스두셋, 1946)

Yut Manufacturer (척사 제조자, 1948)

The Liberation (해방, 1948)

The End of an Artist (한 화가의 최후, 1948)

=== Plays ===
Where is China Going? (중국은 어디로, (1932)
