= Shen Zhihua =

Chinese historian

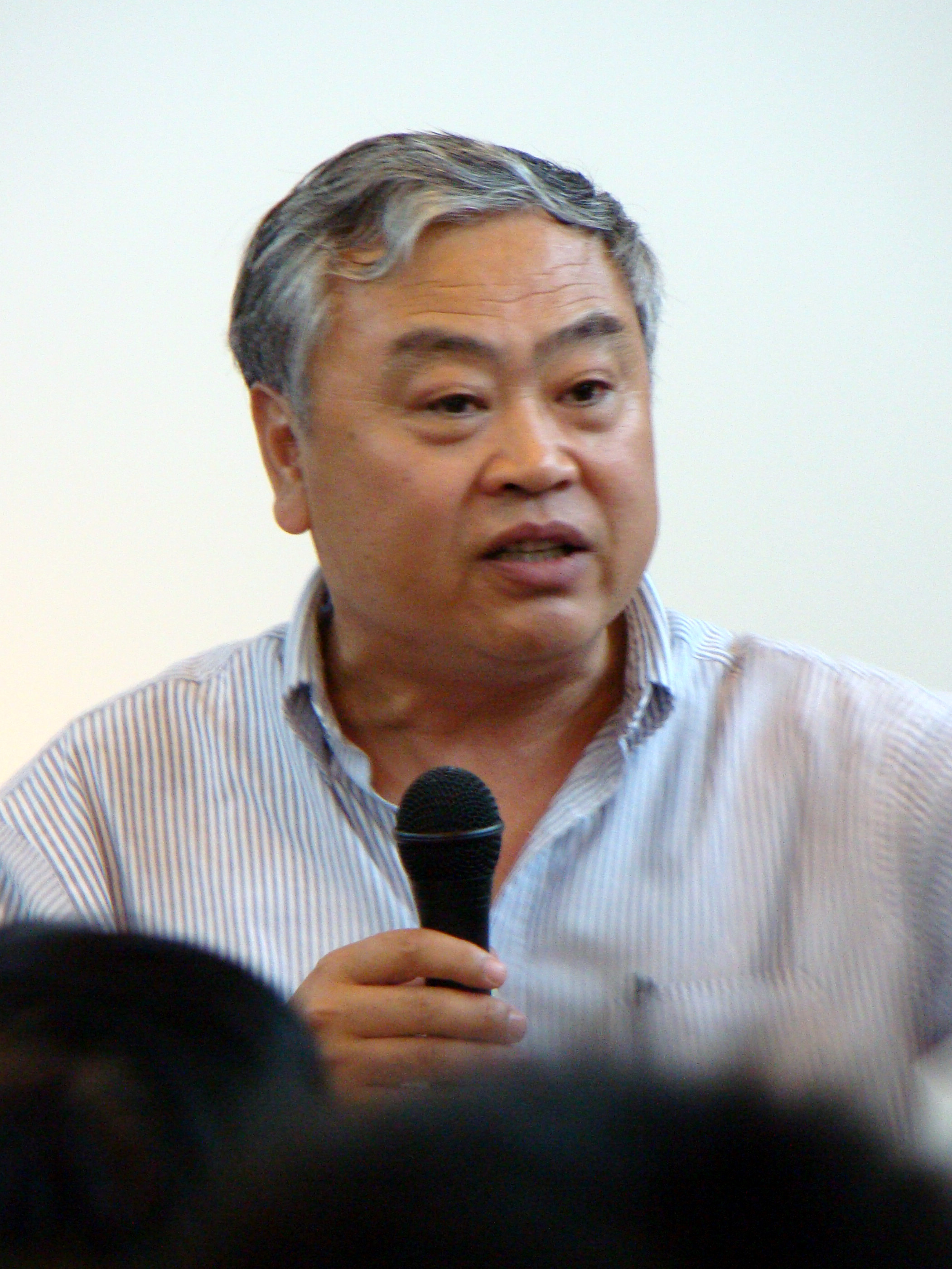
- Shen Zhihua
- Born: April 1950 (age 76); Beijing, China
- Occupations: Historian, university professor
- Spouse: Li Danhui
- Writing career
- Genre: History

Shen Zhihua (simplified Chinese: 沈志华; traditional Chinese: 沈志華; pinyin: Shěn Zhìhuá; born April 1950 in Beijing) is a professor of history at East China Normal University and adjunct professor at Peking University and Renmin University of China. Shen is an expert in the history of the Soviet Union, Sino-Soviet relations, and the Cold War. He is director of the Center for Oriental History Studies of the Chinese Academy of Sciences and honorary researcher at the Chinese University of Hong Kong. In 2011 Shen was public policy scholar at the Woodrow Wilson International Center for Scholars in Washington, D.C.

== Life ==
Shen grew up in Beijing, where his father was the penal system in China's second highest-ranking official. His father has first joined Mao Zedong at Yan'an during the Chinese Civil War Shen was a Navy pilot before he was accused of murder and jailed. He was released after his accuser, a jailhouse informant, recanted.

In the early 1980s, when Shen was a graduate student in world history at the Chinese Academy of Social Sciences, he was sent to jail again and forced to abandon his studies in a politically inspired incident.

Shen went into private business, but eventually returned to Beijing, where he set up a private research organization, Zhongguo Shixuehui Dongfang Lishi Yanjiu Zhongxin (Center for Oriental History Studies, Chinese Historical Association), in 1993. This organization has been extremely productive, helping to publish more than 80 books and monographs and hosting many conferences and scholarly activities, especially in Soviet history and Sino-Soviet relations.

In March 2017, Shen gave a lecture suggesting that China's strategic interests are more aligned with South Korea than North Korea.

== Personal life ==
Shen and Li Danhui, his wife, are known for their generosity to Chinese and foreign scholars, and Shen spent his own money to finance research visits to Moscow for research groups to collect photocopies of archival materials. His wife's father was a close friend of Xi Zhongxun.

== Reception ==
Andrew Nathan of Columbia University said Shen is "highly regarded" in China for "nuanced histories of key episodes in the Cold War," which form "a solid contribution to the field of Cold War international history" and that his work belongs to "a wave of independent Chinese scholarship that demystifies China's role in the conflict by showing the country to be a self-interested state like any other."

== Publications ==
Shen has published more than 60 articles and eight monographs, edited five books, and was the chief editor of pioneering documentary collections on Soviet foreign policy and the Korean War.

- 《新经济政策与苏联农业社会化道路》 (New Economy Policy and the Russian Socialising of Agriculture) 1994. Published in China.
- 《朝鲜战争揭秘》 (The Revealing of the Secret of the Korean War) 1995. Published in Hong Kong. ISBN 978-962-257-833-3
- 《毛泽东、斯大林与韩战》 (Mao Zedong, Stalin, and the Korean War) 1998. Published in Hong Kong. ISBN 978-962-950-335-2
  - Mao, Stalin and the Korean War: Trilateral Communist Relations in the 1950s. Milton Park, Abingdon; New York: Routledge, Cold War History Series, 2012. ISBN 9780415516457
- 《中苏同盟与朝鲜战争研究》 (Research on the Alliance of China and the USSR and the Korean War) 1999. Published in Hong Kong. ISBN 978-7-5633-2896-3
- 《中苏同盟的经济背景：1948-1953》 (The Economic Background of the China-USSR Alliance) 2000. Published in Hong Kong. ISBN 978-962-441-715-9
- 《斯大林与铁托——苏南冲突的起因及其结果》 (Stalin and Tito: The Beginning and the End of the Conflict Between the USSR and Yugoslavia) 2002.
- 《苏联专家在中国（1948-1960）》 (Russian Experts in China 1948–1960) 2003. Published in China. ISBN 978-7-5078-2252-6
- 《毛泽东、斯大林与朝鲜战争》 (Mao Zedong, Stalin, and the Korean War) 2003. Published in China. ISBN 978-7-218-04411-8
- 《思考與選擇: 從知識分子會議到反右派運動, 1956-1957》 2008. ISBN 978-988-17-5623-7
- With Danhui Li: After Leaning to One Side: China and Its Allies in the Cold War 2011. Stanford University Press ISBN 0804770875.
- 《无奈的选择：冷战与中苏同盟的命运（1945－1959）》(A Forced Choice: The Cold War and the Fate of the Sino-Soviet Alliance 1945-1959) Beijing: Social Sciences Academic Press, 2013. ISBN 978-7-5097-3188-8
- 《最后的"天朝"：毛泽东、金日成与中朝关系（1945–1976）》Hong Kong: Chinese University Press, 2017. ISBN 978-988-237-019-7
  - A Misunderstood Friendship：Mao Zedong, Kim Il-sung, and Sino–North Korean Relations, 1949–1976, 2018, Columbia University Press, ISBN 9780231188265
- 《經濟漩渦: 觀察冷戰發生的新視角》 (Economic Vortex：A New Prospective to Observe the Cold War) Hong Kong: Chung Hwa Book Company, 2022. ISBN 9789624592764
