= Hyongmyong sinmun =

Early Korean Communist newspaper

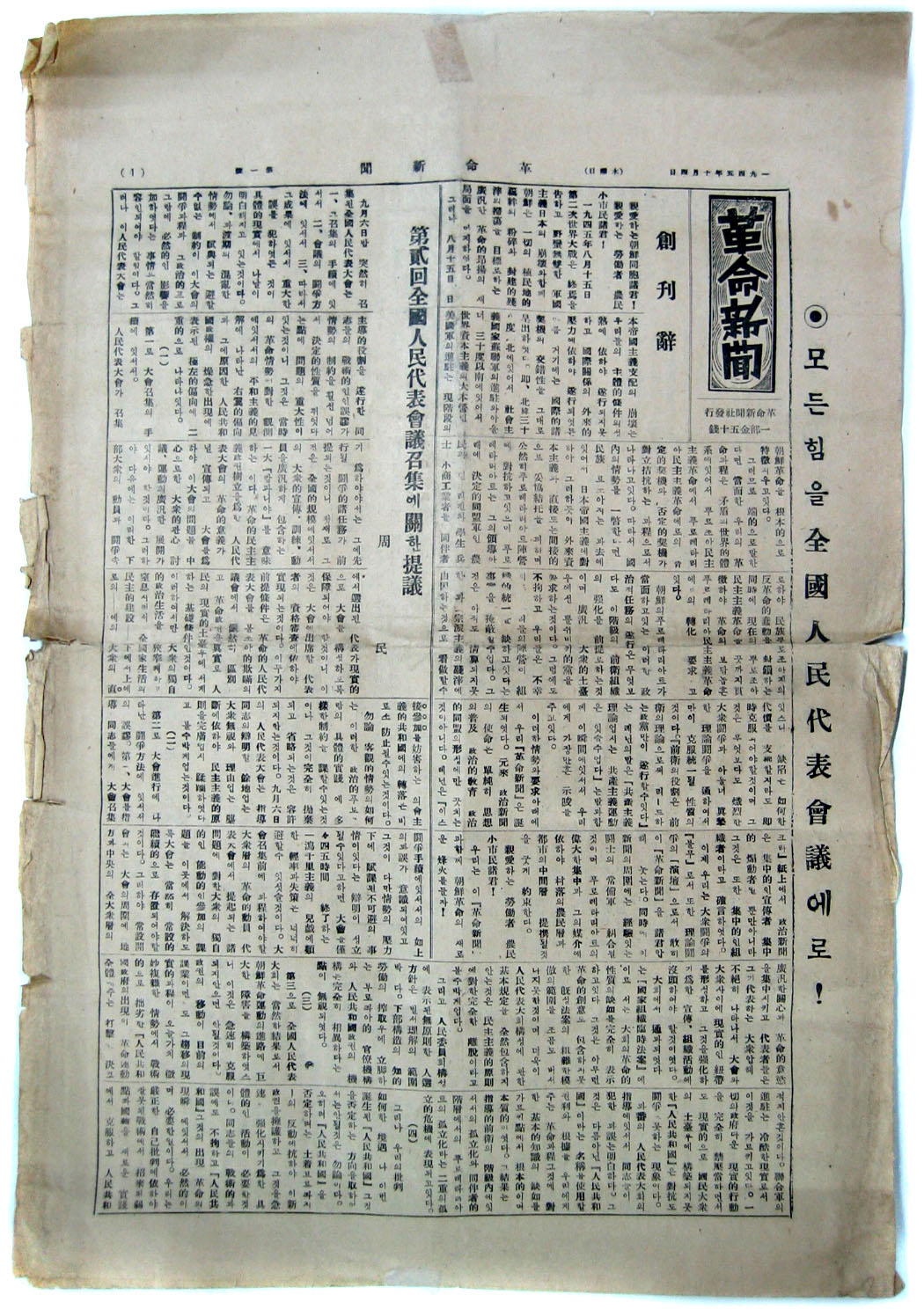
- Founded: 1945
- Political alignment: Communist
- Language: Korean language
- City: Seoul

Hyongmyong sinmun (Korean: 혁명신문; Hanja: 革命新聞; lit. Revolution Newspaper) was a communist newspaper published from Seoul, Korea in the fall of 1945. It was an organ of the 'Changan' faction of the Communist Party of Korea.
