= 8th Congress of the Workers' Party of Korea =

2021 party congress in North Korea

8th Congress of the Workers' Party of Korea 조선로동당 제８차대회
- Date: January 6–12, 2021 (7 days)
- Locations: April 25 House of Culture, Pyongyang, North Korea
- Country: North Korea
- Previous event: 7th Congress of the Workers' Party of Korea (2016)
- Next event: 9th Congress of the Workers' Party of Korea (2026)
- Participants: 7,000 participants

The 8th Congress of the Workers' Party of Korea (WPK) was held at the April 25 House of Culture in Pyongyang from January 5 to 12, 2021. The congress is the highest organ of the party, and is stipulated to be held every four years. A total of 7,000 people participated in the congress including 5,000 delegates.

The Party Congress took place in the midst of the COVID-19 pandemic where no cases were reported. The Congress saw the re-election of Kim Jong Un as the Party leader, with his title being changed from Party Chairman to General Secretary. The WPK Rules were amended, including strengthening WPK's control over the Korean People's Army, decreasing of the power of military organizations, removal of most mentions of Kim Il Sung, Kim Jong Il and Kim Jong Un, and a reassertion of WPK's commitment to communism.

== Preparations ==
Hints of an upcoming 8th WPK Congress first emerged during the 13th Political Bureau meeting of the 7th WPK Central Committee held on June 7, 2020. The meeting mentioned a drafting of an amendment of the WPK Rules, which can only be approved through either a party congress or a party conference.

The congress was announced through a decision issued at the 6th plenary meeting of the 7th WPK Central Committee on August 19, 2020. Among the congress agendas are the review of the work of the WPK Central Committee, the review of the work of the Central Auditing Commission, the revision of the WPK Charter and the election of the central leadership organ.

WPK Chairman Kim Jong Un also revealed during the plenary meeting that a new five-year economic development plan is going to be presented at the congress after mentioning that the current five-year economic development plan has fallen far short of its objectives. Ahead of the party congress, an 80-day mass mobilization campaign was announced at the 19th Political Bureau meeting of the 7th WPK Central Committee on October 5, 2020. The campaign took place from October 12 until December 30, 2020.

On November 29, 2020, the 21st enlarged Political Bureau meeting of the 7th WPK Central Committee was held which discussed preparatory work for the party congress, which included the preparations for the election of delegates to the party congress, the documents for the party congress and the political and cultural events to be held during the party congress. According to analysts, there will likely be a military and civilian parade sometime during the congress.

The Political Bureau of the 7th WPK Central Committee decided during its 22nd meeting on December 29, 2020, that the party congress is to be convened in early January 2021. A separate report from the Korean Central News Agency on December 30 confirmed that the party congress is to be held in Pyongyang.

== Delegates ==
Delegates to the 8th WPK Congress were elected in conferences of provincial party committees and other party organizations in December 2020. They were elected on the basis of one delegate with voting rights for every 1,300 party members and one delegate with speaking rights for every 1,300 candidate party members. Elected party congress delegates arrived in Pyongyang in late December 2020.

The qualifications of party congress delegates were evaluated and approved by the 22nd Political Bureau meeting of the 7th WPK Central Committee on December 29, 2020. The meeting also decided on the members of the party congress' presidium, platform members and secretariat. A ceremony for awarding certificates to party congress delegates was held on December 30, 2020. Kim Il Sung and Kim Jong Il were posthumously declared to be delegates to the party congress.

There was a total of 5,000 delegates to the 8th WPK Congress. Of the 5,000 delegates, 250 were members of the 7th WPK Central Committee and 4,750 delegates were elected by party conferences to represent an estimated 6,175,000 party members and candidate members.

Sector	Delegates		+/–
Sector	8th Congress	7th Congress	+/–
Party and political workers	1,959	1,545	+414
Hardcore party members in field labor	1,455	786	+669
State administration and economy	801	423	+378
Military	408	719	−311
Science, education, public health, art, literature and media	333	112	+221
Working people's organizations	44	52	−8
Total delegates	5,000	3,637	+1,363

501 delegates were women, which is an increase of 186 from the 315 women delegates in the 7th Congress. There were also 2,000 observers, which is an increase of 613 from 1,387 observers in the 7th Congress.

Korean Social Democratic Party chairman Pak Yong-il, Chondoist Chongu Party chairman Ri Myong-chol, and Anti-Imperialist National Democratic Front Pyongyang mission chief Pak Su-chol were invited to attend the congress.

The following delegates were elected as members of the party congress' presidium:

Kim Jong Un, Choe Ryong-hae, Ri Pyong-chol, Kim Tok-hun, Pak Pong-ju, Pak Jong-chon, Kim Jae-ryong, Ri Il-hwan, Choe Hwi, Pak Thae-dok, Kim Yong-chol, Choe Pu-il, Kim Su-gil, Thae Hyong-chol, O Su-yong, Kim Hyong-jun, Ho Chol-man, Pak Myong-sun, Jo Yong-won, Kim Yo Jong, Pak Jong-nam, Yang Sung-ho, Ri Ju-o, Tong Jong-ho, Ko In-ho, Kim Hyong-sik, Choe Sang-gon, O Il-jong, Kim Yong-su, Ri Sang-won, Ri Yong-gil, Kim Myong-gil, Kang Yun-sok

The following delegates were elected as members of the party congress' secretariat:

Sin Ryong Man, Ham Ryong Chol, So Kyong Nam, Kim Pong Chol, Kang Jong Gwan, Kim Jong Min, Ri Hyong Jin

== The Congress ==
The general agenda for the 8th Party Congress were as follows:

- Review on the activities of the outgoing 7th Central Committee
- Review on the activities of the 7th Central Auditing Commission
- Amendments to the Rules
- Election of Kim Jong Un as leader of the Party in the title of General Secretary
- Election of the incoming 8th Central Committee and the party departments under the CC

=== Party Rules Amendment ===
The 8th party Congress amended the party rules. It changed the leader of the party from Chairman to General Secretary, established a post called First Secretary, mostly removed mentions of Kim Il Sung, Kim Jong Il and Kim Jong Un, removed a line calling for a revolution in South Korea, and reasserted its commitment to communism. "Military-first policy" was also removed from the charter, being replaced by "people-first politics".

The influence of the Korean People's Army Party Committee and the General Political Bureau was decreased; with the committee now ranking equal to provincial party committees, similar arrangement as in other communist countries, such as East Germany's Political Headquarters. The GPB was also no longer equal to the Central Committee, while the WPK Central Military Commission was again given effective command of the armed forces. The Military Affairs Department of the WPK Central Committee was abolished, with its functions being transferred to the Department of Military-Political Leadership. A military parade concluded the congress.
