= 3rd Conference of the Workers' Party of Korea =

2010 event in North Korean politics

- The flag of the Workers' Party of Korea
- Date: 28 September 2010
- Location: Kumsusan Memorial Palace, Pyongyang
- Outcome: Election of the Party General Secretary, Central Committee, Central Military Commission and Central Auditing Commission

- 3rd Conference of the Workers' Party of Korea
- Hangul: 조선로동당 제3차 대표자회
- Hanja: 朝鮮勞動黨 第3次 代表者會
- RR: Joseon rodongdang je3cha daepyojahoe
- MR: Chosŏn rodongdang che3ch'a taep'yojahoe

The 3rd Conference of the Workers' Party of Korea was held in Pyongyang on September 28, 2010. The meeting elected the highest authority of the Workers' Party of Korea, and revised the party charter. North Korean leader, Kim Jong Il, also attended the meeting.

A plenary meeting of the Central Auditing Committee of the Workers' Party of Korea and the September 2010 plenary meeting of the Central Committee of the Workers' Party of Korea were held earlier on the same day.

The conference is most noted for Kim Jong Un's public debut as successor to Kim Jong Il, with the former being elected to the Central Committee and the new position of Vice Chairman of the Central Military Commission of the WPK. The conference was also the first national meeting of the WPK since 1980.

== Overview ==
According to Xinhuanet's report from the Korean Central News Agency, after the start of the plenary session on September 28, 2010, Kim Yong-nam, Chairman of the Standing Committee of the Supreme People's Assembly, made a report on the election of Kim Jong Il for the General Secretary of the Workers' Party of Korea. After discussion, the delegates unanimously supported and passed Kim Jong Il's proposal to be re-elected as the general secretary of the Workers' Party of Korea.

According to the Charter of the WPK, the Election Rules for the Supreme Leadership Organization of the Workers' Party of Korea, the meeting of the delegates announced that Kim Jong Il is a member of the Standing Committee of the Politburo of the Workers' Party of Korea, a member of the Political Bureau of the Workers' Party of Korea Central Committee, Member of the Central Committee and Chairman of the Central Military Commission of the WPK. Elected 124 members of the Central Committee of the WPK, including Kim Jong Il, Kang Sok-ju, Kim Jong Un, Kim Kyong-hui, and Pak Myong-sun, and 105 alternate members of the Central Committee of the WPK, including Jiang Jixie. Fifteen members of the Central Auditing Commission of the Workers' Party of Korea including Jin Changzhu and Park Mingshun were elected.

The meeting also notified the contents of the decision of the first plenary meeting of the Central Committee of the Workers' Party of Korea held earlier on the same day, and the contents of the decision of the September 2010 plenary meeting of the Central Committee of the Workers' Party of Korea. The newly elected members of the Central Auditing Committee of the Workers' Party of Korea attended the party representative meeting.

The meeting of representatives passed the "Decision on Revising the Charter of the WPK." According to reports, the amendment comprehensively revised and supplemented the obligations of the WPK party members and the work content of party organizations at all levels, adding new chapters such as "Party and People's Government", "Party Emblem, and Party Flag", and added information on strengthening the Party. The leadership of the People's Government and Kim Il Sung Kim Jong Il Youth League, as well as the content of enhancing the role of party organizations within the Korean People's Army. The revisions transferred the powers to elect the General Secretary from the Central Committee to the Party Congress or Conference.

The report also stated that:

"Representatives of the heads of the Korean Party, armed forces, political organs, community groups, provincial and central organs, heads of the military, science, education, health care, culture and arts, press and publication departments of the People's Army attended the representatives of the Labor Party. The meeting. Jin Yongnan delivered opening and closing remarks at the meeting. After discussion and decision of the representative council of various representatives of North Korea, Cabinet Prime Minister Cui Yonglin was appointed as the speaker of the party representative meeting to carry out the relevant work of the meeting.

== Central Auditing Committee ==
The first plenary meeting of the Central Auditing Committee of the Workers' Party of Korea was held on September 28, 2010 in Pyongyang.

In this plenary meeting, Kim Chang-soo was elected as the chairman of the Central Auditing Committee of the Workers' Party of Korea, and Park Ming-shun was the vice chairman of the Central Auditing Committee of the Workers' Party of Korea. The meeting also elected members of the Central Auditing Committee of the WPK.

The Central Inspection Committee of the Workers' Party of Korea is the organization responsible for financial auditing and inspection of the Party's financial work as stipulated in the Constitution of the Workers' Party of Korea.

== Plenary Session of the Central Committee ==
The September 2010 Plenary Meeting of the Central Committee of the Workers' Party of Korea was held in Pyongyang on September 28, 2010.

The meeting discussed and elected the Standing Committee of the Politburo of the Central Committee of the Workers' Party of Korea, and elected Kim Jong Il, Kim Yong-nam, Choe Yong-rim, Jo Myong-rok, and Ri Yong-ho as members of the Standing Committee of the Politburo of the Central Committee of the Workers' Party of Korea.

The plenary session elected Kim Jong Il, Kim Yong-nam, Choe Yong-rim, Jo Myong-rok, Kim Yong-chun, Jon Pyong-ho, Kim Kuk-thae, Kim Ki-nam, Choe Thae-bok, Yang Hyong-sop, Kang Sok-ju, Pyon Yong-rip, Ri Yong-mu, Ju Sang-song, Hong Sok-hyong, Kim Kyong-hui as members of the Politburo of the Central Committee of the Korean Workers' Party. 15 alternate members of the Politburo of the Central Committee of the Workers' Party of Korea, including Kim Yang-gon, Kim Yong-il, and Jang Song-thaek, were elected.

The plenary session elected Kim Ki-nam, Choe Thae-bok, Choe Ryong-hae, Mun Kyong-dok, Pak To-chun, Kim Yong-il, Kim Yang-gon, Kim Phyong-hae, Thae Jong-su, and Hong Sok-hyong as secretaries of the Central Committee of the WPK.

The plenary session elected Kim Jong Il as the chairman of the Central Military Commission of the Workers' Party of Korea, Kim Jong Un and Ri Yong-ho as vice chairmen, and also elected 16 members of the Central Military Committee of the Workers' Party of Korea, including Kim Yong-chun, Kim Jong-gak, Kim Myong-guk, and Jang Song-thaek.

The plenary appointed Kim Ki-nam, Jang Song-thaek, Kim Yong-il, Kim Phyong-hae, Ri Yong-su, Ju Kyu-chang, Hong Sok-hyong, Kim Kyong-hui, Kim Phyong-hae, Choe Hi-jong, O Il-jong, Kim Yang-gon, Kim Jong-im, Chae Hi-jong, and Thae Jong-su as the Central Ministers of the WPK, Kim Ki-ryong was appointed as the chief editor of the Rodong Sinmun.

The plenary session elected Kim Guk-thae as the chairman of the Central Auditing Committee of the Workers' Party of Korea, Jong Myong-hak as the first vice chairman, Ri Dung-nam as the vice chairman, Cha Gwan-sok, Bak Tong-man, Cha Sun-gil, and Kim Yong-song as members.
