= List of national meetings of the Workers' Party of Korea =

Party congresses

The following is a list of national meetings of the Workers' Party of Korea. This article defines national meetings as party congresses (Korean: 조선로동당 당대회) and conferences of party representatives (Korean: 조선로동당 대표자회).

The Party Congress is nominally the highest body of the Workers' Party of Korea (WPK) according to its charter. The charter stated specifically that it should convene at least every fifth year; however, the congress has historically never managed to be convened in that time frame. There was a gap of 36 years between the 6th Congress and the 7th Congress. However, two party conferences were convened in the period 2010–2012. The 3rd Party Conference in 2010 formally deleted the five-year clause from the party charter, but it was later restored at the 8th Congress in 2021.

The Congress hears the reports of central authorities, makes amendments to the party's charter, sets the party's political line, elects the General Secretary of the Workers' Party of Korea, elects the Central Committee and elects the Central Auditing Commission. The 1st Plenary Session of the elected Central Committee then elects the Politburo, the Secretariat, the Central Military Commission and other bodies of the Central Committee. Despite this, as Fyodor Tertitskiy notes, "When it comes to the supreme leader of North Korea, it is not his position that makes him a leader; it is the person who makes a position one of leadership. Kim Jong Un may be called supreme commander, first chairman or even God-Emperor — it does not matter; he is in charge by right of bloodline." For example, Kim Jong Un's election as Chairman of the WPK at the 7th Party Congress did not mean that said Congress was previously empowered to make decisions independent of Kim Jong Un.

The Party Conferences functions as a smaller scale version of a Party Congress and serves as the Leninist counterpart to an extraordinary general meeting. It is typically convened to introduce new leadership or policy directions between regular congresses. As such meetings are less formal and less costly to organize, they are often held when a full Congress is unnecessary.

== Keys ==
Abbreviations
CC	Central Committee of the Workers' Party of Korea
FM	Full member (a member with voting rights).
AM	Alternate member (a member without voting rights).
Political Report	Political Report to the Central Committee, a document which briefs delegates about the period since the last congress and future work.
Charter	Charter of the Workers' Party of Korea, the rules and regulations which governs the WPK.
PMR	Party members represented at the congress by delegates (the party membership at the time).
ND	Not disclosed by the WPK.

== Meetings ==
=== Congresses ===
Congress	Duration (start—end)	Delegates	CC elected	Political Report (presented by)	Charter	PMR	Location
1st Congress; 3 days 1946 election	28 August – 30 August 1946	801	43	Kim Il Sung	Adopted	336,399	Pyongyang
2nd Congress; 4 days 1947–1948 election	27 March – 30 March 1948	999	63	Kim Il Sung	Amendment	750,000	Pyongyang
3rd Congress; 7 days 1955–1956 election	23 April – 29 April 1956	916	71 FM – 43 AM	Kim Il Sung	Amendment	1,164,945	Pyongyang
4th Congress; 8 days 1960–1961 election	11 September – 18 September 1961	1,657 VD – 93 NVD	85 FM – 50 AM	Kim Il Sung	Amendment	1,311,563	Pyongyang
5th Congress; 12 days 1969–1970 election	2 November – 13 November 1970	1,734	117 FM – 55 AM	Kim Il Sung	Amendment	1,600,000	Pyongyang
6th Congress; 5 days 1979–1980 election	10 October – 14 October 1980	3,062 VD – 137 NVD	145 FM – 103 AM	Kim Il Sung	Amendment	ND	April 25 House of Culture; Pyongyang
7th Congress; 4 days 2016 election	6 May – 9 May 2016	3,467 VD – 200 NVD	129 FM – 106 AM	Kim Jong Un	Amendment	ND	April 25 House of Culture; Pyongyang
8th Congress; 6 days 2020–21 election	5 January – 10 January 2021	5,000 VD – 2,000 NVD	139 FM – 111 AM	Kim Jong Un	Amendment	ND	April 25 House of Culture; Pyongyang
9th Congress; 6 days 2021–26 election	19 February – 25 February 2026	5,000 VD – 2,000 NVD	139 FM – 111 AM	Kim Jong Un	Amendment	ND	April 25 House of Culture; Pyongyang

=== Conferences ===
Conference	Duration (start—end)	CC elected	Charter (amendments)	Decisions
1st Conference; 4 days 1958 election	3 March – 6 March 1958	—	—	1) "On First Five-year People’s Economic Development Plan"; 2) "On Further Strengthening Party Unity and Cohesion"; 3) On "organizational issues"
2nd Conference; 4 days 1966 election	3 October – 6 October 1966	—	—	1) "Current Situation and Our Party's Tasks"; 2) "On Imminent Tasks of Socialist Economic Construction"; 3) "On the Vietnam Issue"
3rd Conference; 1 day 2010 election	28 September 2010	124 FM – 105 AM	Amendment	1) "Decision To Unchangingly Elect High Great Leader Comrade Kim Jong Il as the WPK General Secretary"; 2) "Decision on Revising the WPK Charter"; 3) "Election of members to the central leadership organs of the WPK"
4th Conference; 1 day 2012 election	11 April 2012	—	Amendment	ND
