= Five-point Party-building line in the new era =

North Korean ideology

- Hangul: 새시대 5대 당건설노선
- RR: saesidae 5dae danggeonseolloseon
- MR: saesidae 5tae tanggŏnsŏllosŏn

The five-point Party-building line in the new era (Korean: 새시대 5대 당건설노선) is a political concept and slogan first proposed by Workers' Party of Korea (WPK) general secretary Kim Jong Un in October 2022. It was written into the Party Rules at the 9th WPK Congress in February 2026.

The concept was first proposed by Workers' Party of Korea (WPK) general secretary Kim Jong Un as the five-point party building platform during a commemorative lecture at the Central Cadres Training School in October 2022. It was adopted as the five-point Party building line of the new era at the sixth plenary meeting of the 8th WPK Central Committee in December 2022. It was written into the Party Rules at the 9th WPK Congress in February 2026. The resolution of the Congress stated that the concept would be "firmly grasped as a permanent line for party building".

== Content ==
The five-point Party-building line in the new era constitutes an eternal Party-building programme which indicates the path for developing the WPK into a promising party and a powerful ideological and theoretical weapon which provided a sure guarantee for victoriously accelerating the building of socialism and communism by remarkably enhancing its leadership role.

— The Pyongyang Times, 11 April 2024

The five points are:

1. Political building
2. Organizational building
3. Ideological building
4. Disciplinary building
5. Work style building

According to the WPK, the line aims to build the WPK into a party that is "politically mature, organizationally strong, ideologically pure, strict in discipline and sound in work style". Kim Jong un said in 2022 that political building "should always be given priority" and guide other aspects of party building.

== See also ==
- Ideology of the Workers' Party of Korea
- Two hostile states theory
