= 6th Central Auditing Commission of the Workers' Party of Korea =

The 6th Central Auditing Commission of the Workers' Party of Korea (Korean: 6차 조선로동당 중앙감사위원회; WPK) was elected at the party's 6th Congress on 14 October 1980.

Upon its renewal at the 3rd WPK Conference in 2010 it was composed of one chairman, one vice chair and 13 ordinary members. In 2012, at the 4th WPK Conference, members were recalled and elected to fill vacancies but the individuals in questions were not made public.

== Members ==
=== 6th Congress (1980–2010) ===
Rank	Name	Hangul	5th CAC	Office
1	Ri Rak-bin	리락빈(李樂彬)	New	Chairman of the WPK Central Auditing Commission.
2	Kang Chom-gu	강점구	New	—
3	Kim Chong-song	김종성	New	—
4	Chu Hwa-jong	주화중	Old	—
5	Pang Ki-yong	방기영	New	—
6	Chong Tu-hwan	정두환	New	—
7	Song Kwan-jo	송관조	New	—
8	Kang Chung-han	강중한	New	—
9	Choe Chi-son	최치선	New	—
10	Yi Chong-sik	이정식(리정식)	New	—
11	Sin Sang-yun	신상윤	New	—
12	Pak Yong-chan	박영찬	New	—
13	So Son-chol	서선철	New	—
14	Yi Yong-sun	리용순	New	—
15	Song Kum-sun	송금순	Old	—

=== 3rd Conference (2010–16) ===
Rank	Name	Hangul	7th CAC	Office
1	Kim Chang-su	김창수	Demoted	Chairman of the WPK Central Auditing Commission.
2	Pak Myong-sun	박명순	Reelected	Vice Chair of the WPK Central Auditing Commission.
3	Choe Pae-jin	최배진	Demoted	—
4	Kim Chol	김철	Demoted	—
5	Sim Chol-ho	심철호	Demoted	—
6	O Ryong-il	오룡일	Demoted	—
7	Kye Yong-sam	계영삼	Reelected	—
8	Ryu Hyon-sik	류현식	Demoted	—
9	Ko Myong-hui	고명희	Demoted	—
10	Pang Yong-uk	방용욱	Demoted	—
11	Jang Jong-ju	장정주	Reelected	—
12	Ho Kwang-uk	허광욱	Reelected	—
13	Ji Tong-sik	지동식	Demoted	—
14	Jong Pong-sok	정봉석	Reelected	—
15	Choe Kwon-su	최권수	Reelected	—
