= 6th Congress of the Workers' Party of Korea =

1980 party conference in North Korea

- The flag of the Workers' Party of Korea
- Date: 10–14 October 1980 (4 days)
- Location: February 8 House of Culture, Pyongyang, North Korea
- Participants: 3,062 delegates
- Outcome: Election of the 6th Central Committee and 6th Central Auditing Commission

The 6th Congress of the Workers' Party of Korea (WPK) was held in the February 8 House of Culture in Pyongyang, North Korea, from 10 to 14 October 1980. The congress is the highest organ of the party, and is stipulated to be held every four years. 3,062 delegates represented the party's membership; 117 foreign delegates attended the congress, without the right to speak. The congress saw the reappointment of Kim Il Sung as WPK General Secretary and the Presidium of the Politburo established as the highest organ of the party between congresses.

At this congress, Kim Il Sung designated his son Kim Jong Il as his successor. The move was criticized by the South Korean media and ruling communist parties of the Eastern Bloc because it was considered nepotist. The congress also saw the WPK and North Korea move away from orthodox communism by emphasizing the Juche idea over Marxism–Leninism, giving the party a nationalistic bent. The next party congress was not convened until 2016, despite party rules stipulating that a congress had to be held every fifth year.

== Preparations ==
Little is known about the preparations for the 6th Congress. It was convened a decade after the 5th WPK Congress (in 1970), outside the party norm of a quadrennial meeting. There was no official reason for its postponement, but it was probably due to the fact that WPK General Secretary Kim Il Sung spent much of the 1970s gathering support (and creating an independent power base) for his son and planned successor Kim Jong Il. In addition, a great deal of time was spent restructuring party organizations and functions. The primary reason for the 6th Congress was to formalize Kim Jong Il as Kim Il Sung's chosen successor.

== Delegates and attendees ==
The 6th Congress was attended by 3,062 delegates with voting rights and 158 without them; this marked an increase of 1,349 voting and 137 non-voting delegates from the 5th Congress. The increase indicates a growth in membership. The 6th Congress is significant for its large number of delegations: 177 delegations from 118 countries were represented. While communist and workers' parties customarily invite "fraternal parties" to party congresses, the WPK had taken the unusual step of not inviting foreign delegations to the 1st, 2nd and 5th congresses. Among those invited this time were the Chinese Communist Party and the Communist Party of the Soviet Union. The WPK leadership also invited a number of non-communist parties and organizations to the congress. The official report said that 155 foreign organizations from 105 countries attended the congress, indicating that 22 delegations remained incognito. For unknown reasons, no foreign delegates spoke at the congress.

== The Congress ==
The 6th Congress was held at the February 8 House of Culture from 10 to 14 October 1980, with a recess on 11 October. Compared to its predecessor, the 6th Congress was fairly short. It began with opening addresses by Kim Il Sung, the Executive Bureau, the Secretariat and the Credentials Committee. After the opening remarks, the congress' agenda was decided: "(1) Summing up the work of the Party Central Committee; (2) Evaluation of the work of the Party Central Auditing Committee; (3) Revision of the Party Rules and (4) Election of the central leading agencies of the Party." This was followed by a report on the Central Committee's performance since the 5th Congress. The 6th Congress was adjourned on 11 October, and 12 October began with the election of a committee to draft congressional decisions. Lee Nak-bin then delivered a report on the work of the Central Auditing Committee since the 5th Congress. The rest of the day was spent discussing the Central Committee report. 13 October was devoted to debates and congratulatory speeches, and on 14 October the congress elected the 6th Central Committee and the 6th Central Auditing Commission.

Significant at the 6th Congress was the generational shift within the WPK, with Kim Il Sung planning to formalize the position of Kim Jong Il. 248 members were elected to the 6th Central Committee: 145 full members and 103 candidate members. This was an increase of 76 members from the 5th Central Committee, which had 172 members. The expansion of the Central Committee is a sign of an expanding party, since one Central Committee member represents 10,000 party members. Of the 248 members, "139 (60 full members and 79 candidate members)" were new to the Central Committee. However, compared to previous Central Committees the replacement rate was relatively low (41.4%, compared with 72.2% at the 5th Congress). Only two members have sat on the Central Committee since the 1st Central Committee: Kim Il Sung and Kim Il. The cause of the high Central Committee replacement rate had been intra-party conflict, and the Yanan, South Korean, domestic and Soviet-Korean factions (as well as ideological opponents of hereditary succession) had been purged from the Central Committee at previous congresses. Amendments to Party rules changed the name of the Political Committee back to its original name (the Politburo), and created a Presidium within the Politburo to further centralize the power of the ruling elite.

Of the 158 delegates with speaking rights, 39 participated in the debates—much-lower participation than at the 5th Congress, in which 98 of 137 delegates with speaking rights participated. All debate participants were Party bureaucrats and technocrats, making it the first congress at which the "revolutionary generation" was not present. 38 topics were debated: twenty-one focused on the economy, ten on politics, five on social and cultural affairs, one on military affairs and one on possible unification with South Korea. Socialist construction, the designated primary task of the party during the 1980s, was the focal point of the discussions. The 6th Congress ended with Kim Il Sung presenting a summary of what had been decided: "(a) Shining victory of the Three Revolutions—achievements in ideological, technological and cultural revolutions; (b) Conversion of entire society along the lines of Juche idea; (c) Independent and peaceful reunification of the fatherland; (d) Strengthening of the solidarity with the anti-imperialist self-reliant forces; (e) strengthening of Party work."

=== 1st plenum ===
The 1st plenum of the 6th Central Committee, to elect the central party leadership, was held immediately after the 6th Congress. 34 members were elected to the 6th Politburo, an increase from 15 in the 5th Politburo. Of these 34, 19 were full members and 15 candidate members. Five members were elected to the Presidium, and Kim Jong Il was ranked fourth in the hierarchy of the Politburo and the Presidium. The 6th Secretariat was composed of nine members, with Kim Jong Il ranked second. The size of the Secretariat did not change from the 5th Congress, but of its nine members only Kim Il Sung was from the party's "revolutionary generation" (60% of the members of the 5th Secretariat came from that generation). Kim Il Sung and Kim Jung-rin were the only incumbents to be reelected. The elected 6th Central Military Commission (CMC) was composed of 19 members, of which Kim Jong Il ranked third (behind Kim Il Sung and O Jin-u). This marked the first time in the party's history that the CMC membership was made public. Kim Il Sung and Kim Jong Il became the only officials with seats in all four bodies: the Presidium, Politburo, Secretariat and CMC. While Kim Jong Il was outranked in the Presidium, Politburo and Secretariat, none of the members who outranked him had positions in other bodies (except for O Jin-ju, second-ranked member of the CMC). Below is a list of members (and their respective rankings) of the Presidium, full and candidate members of the Politburo, Secretariat and CMC:

Symbol	Meaning
‡	Members of the Presidium of the Politburo of the Workers' Party of Korea

#	Full members	Candidate members	Secretariat members	CMC members
1.	‡Kim Il Sung	Ho Dam	‡Kim Il Sung	‡Kim Il Sung
2.	‡Kim Il	Yun Gi-bok	‡Kim Jong Il	‡O Jin-u
3.	‡O Jin-u	Choe Kwang	Kim Jung-rin	‡Kim Jong Il
4.	‡Kim Jong Il	Choe Se-ung	Kim Yong-nam	Choe Hyon
5.	‡Ri Jong-ok	Choe Jae-u	Kim Hwan	Oh Baek-ryong
6.	Pak Song-chol	Kong Jin-Tae	Yon Hyong-muk	Chon Mun-sop
7.	Choe Hyon	Chong Jun-gi	Yun Gi-bok	Oh Guk-ryol
8.	Lim Chum-chu	Kim Chol-man	Hong Si-hak	Paek Hak-rim
9.	So Chol	Chong Gyong-hi	Hwang Jang-yop	Kim Chol-man
10.	Oh Baek-ryong	Choe Yong-rim		Kim Gang-hwan
11.	Kim Jung-rin	So Yun-sok		Tae Byong-ryol
12.	Kim Yong-nam	Ri Kun-mo		Ri Ul-sol
13.	Chon Mun-sop	Hyon Mu-gwang		Chu Do-il
14.	Kim Hwan	Kim Gang-hwan		Lee Du-ik
15.	Yon Hyong-huk	Lee Son-sil		Cho Myong-rok
16.	Oh Guk-ryol			Kim Il-chol
17.	Kye Ung-thae			Choe Sang-uk
18.	Kang Song-san			Lee Bon-won
19.	Paek Hak-rim			Oh Ryong-bang

The 1st plenum saw the "revolutionary generation" retire from their executive posts, surrendering them to the new generation of Kim Jong Il; however, they still controlled the highest organs of power: the Presidium and the Politburo. The plenum saw the disappearance of Kim Yong-ju (Kim Il Sung's brother, considered his chosen successor before Kim Jong Il), Kim Dong-gyu, Ryu Jang-sik and Ri Yong-mu from important party positions. The reason for the purge is unknown, but presumably linked to Kim Il Sung's time-consuming consolidation of his son's power base.

== Policy decisions ==
=== Kim Jong Il as successor ===
Kim Il Sung with his son and chosen successor Kim Jong Il at the congress.

Kim Yong-ju was believed to be Kim Il Sung's first choice as successor, and his authority increased until he became co-chairman of the North–South Coordination Committee. From late 1972 until the 6th Congress, Kim Yong-ju became an increasingly remote figure within the regime; at the 6th Congress, he lost his seats in the Politburo and on the Central Committee. However, rumors were confirmed that Kim Il Sung began grooming Kim Jong Il in 1966. From 1974 until the 6th Congress, Kim Jong Il (called the "Party centre" by North Korean media) became the second-most-powerful man in North Korea.

The choice of Kim Jong Il as Kim Il Sung's successor met with considerable criticism. Critics accused Kim Il Sung of creating a dynasty, turning North Korea into a feudal state. An anonymous South Korean critic said, "Hereditary succession of power [was an] inevitable consequence of the elder Kim's irrevocable commitment to the dream of founding a dynasty of his own and of his family", adding that Kim Jong Il's rise to power was proof of the "degeneration" of the WPK into a "thoroughly personalized family affair built up around a personality cult." The Communist Party of the Soviet Union, the Chinese Communist Party and other ruling parties of socialist states did not approve Kim Jong Il's appointment as heir apparent. Kim Il Sung's choice of successor arguably concerned the promotion of revolutionary zeal in the country (taking into account the negative treatment Joseph Stalin received from his successor).

=== Korean unification ===
At the congress, Kim Il Sung stressed the importance of "achieving the goal of the unification of the fatherland which has been the greatest and long-cherised desire of the whole people is the most important revolutionary task facing the Party". He warned his audience that if Korea remained divided, it might never be unified again because of relations among the big powers. Kim Il Sung called for the establishment of the "Democratic Confederal Republic of Korea" (DCRK), a national government of North and South Korea. The DCRK would be ruled by a Supreme Confederal National Congress (SCNC), with an equal number of representatives from North and South Korea. The SCNC representatives would elect a Presidium, which would rule on its behalf. Under this system, South Korea would remain capitalist and North Korea socialist. However, the WPK leadership named three conditions for North Korea to join the DCRK: (1) Social democratization of South Korea, the ouster of its current ruling class, repeal of the Anti-Communist and National Security Laws and replacement of its military regime by a democratic one representing the will of the people; (2) Reducing tensions with the establishment of a truce and a peace agreement; (3) Reducing American interference in the region, holding open the possibility of improved relations with the United States if it supported Korean reunification.

=== From communism to nationalism ===
Man is a social being living in a community called nation, and his struggle for self-determination is waged within the boundary of a nation-state. A search for national self-determination takes top priority over other matters in a revolution of any country. A nation must exist before revolution, construction, ideology, or ideal, and they lose their meanings in the absence of a nation. Whether we uphold nationalism, communism, or any other ideology we must recover our nationhood first."

— Party secretary Kim Jung-rin, on North Korea's unification ideology

The 6th Congress signified a move away from orthodox communism, with the Juche given primacy over Marxism–Leninism; in foreign relations, an independent national policy was given primacy over proletarian internationalism. According to political analyst Kim Nam-sik, "They [changes] represent a marked departure from the fundamental principles of communism, and a new orientation for the North Korean future in the 1980s." In contrast to other ruling communist parties in socialist states, democratic centralism in the WPK did not hold the leader (the WPK General Secretary) accountable. In many ways it functioned the other way around, with the WPK accountable to the leader. This unusual system is rooted in North Korea's leader theory.

In contrast to other socialist states (which upheld the orthodox communist belief that the masses are masters of historical development), WPK ideology asserts that the masses can only initiate revolutionary change through a leader. While other socialist states often emphasized certain historical figures, due weight was still given to the people. The opposite occurred in North Korea, where the party line was "The great revolutionary task of the working class is pioneered and led to victory by the Leader and completed under the leadership of the Leader only." From this perspective, the revolutionary task given the working class by the other socialist regimes became the sole responsibility of the leader in North Korea. The leader theory supports one-man leadership, since all important tasks can only be accomplished by a great leader it argues. This ideological outlook may explain why Kim Il Sung appointed his son, Kim Jong Il, as his successor. In North Korea, Kim Il Sung was considered a "Great Leader" with a decisive role; he was cited by official media as the man who established the WPK and founder of the Juche idea. Because of this, Kim Il Sung was not "elected" WPK General Secretary; the position was bestowed on him by divine right.

For the sake of realizing unification of the fatherland, the South and the North should not stick to their respective ideologies of communism and capitalism, but the two should put one common ideology of nation before the two ideologies so as to achieve a union based on the idea of nation.

— Kim Il-Sung, emphasizing that the nation (not capitalism or communism) should be the common ideology of the two Koreas

While North Korea had already begun to move from a foreign policy based upon proletarian internationalism at the Conference of Party Representatives in 1966, the WPK leadership had never explicitly broken with proletarian internationalism as it did at the 6th Congress. In theory, a communist party supports policy contributing to the world revolution. Communist regimes rarely lived up to this ideal; by the 1950s, ideological schisms within the world communist movement made it all but impossible. From 1966 onwards, North Korea strengthened relations with neutral countries in the global Cold War. Proletarian internationalism was replaced with a national, independent foreign policy; if a socialist and non-socialist country were at war, North Korea could (in theory) support the non-socialist country if it benefited North Korea. At the 6th Congress, Kim Il Sung attached more importance to relations with Third World countries than to unity in the socialist camp. Nevertheless, North Korea still received massive funds and aid from the Soviet bloc, the People's Republic of China and relations with the United States would remain bitterly cold. While North Korea argues that independence and proletarian internationalism are not exclusive, in orthodox communist theory they are.

== Works cited ==
- Kim, Nam-Sik (Spring–Summer 1982). "North Korea's Power Structure and Foreign Relations: an Analysis of the Sixth Congress of the KWP*". The Journal of East Asian Affairs. 2 (1). Institute for National Security Strategy: 125–151. JSTOR 23253510.
- Kim, Young (January 1981). "North Korea in 1980: The Son also Rises". Asian Survey. 21 (1). University of California Press: 112–124. doi:10.2307/2643670. JSTOR 2643670.
- Lee, Chong-sik (May 1982). "Evolution of the Korean Workers' Party and the Rise of Kim Chŏng-il". Asian Survey. 22 (5). University of California Press: 434–448. doi:10.2307/2643871. JSTOR 2643871.
