= 3rd Congress of the Workers' Party of Korea =

1956 party conference in North Korea

- The flag of the Workers' Party of Korea
- Date: 23–29 April 1956 (7 days)
- Location: Pyongyang, North Korea
- Participants: 916 delegates
- Outcome: Election of the 3rd Central Committee and 3rd Central Auditing Committee

The 3rd Congress of the Workers' Party of Korea (WPK) was held in Pyongyang, North Korea, from 23–29 April 1956. The congress is the highest organ of the party, and is stipulated to be held every four years. 916 delegates represented the party's 1,164,945 members. The 3rd Central Committee, elected by the congress, reelected Kim Il Sung as WPK Chairman, and a number of deputy chairmen.

== Background ==
The 17th Plenary Session of the 2nd Central Committee decided on 3 December 1955 that the 3rd Congress would be held in April 1956, two months after the 20th Congress of the Communist Party of the Soviet Union (CPSU), in which de-Stalinization became the Soviet Union's official policy. Choe Yong-gon, a partisan close to Kim Il Sung, attended the 20th Congress and reported on its activities personally to Kim Il Sung when he returned. After being told of the new Soviet policy, Kim Il Sung reacted swiftly; in his first speech after the CPSU congress he told WPK members that they needed to curtail the powers of a single leader by establishing a collective leadership. Kim Il Sung went on to chastise former figures such as Pak Hon-yong and Yi Sung-yop who, he claimed, had exerted "individual heroism" and failed to follow collective leadership procedures. However, this was just talk, and no one related the discussion about collective leadership to Kim Il Sung's power concentration at the top; he held the highest party office, the WPK chairmanship, and the highest state office, as head of government. In a similar vein, Kim Il Sung did not refer to the Soviet Union's de-Stalinization policies by name and did not criticize Joseph Stalin's leadership; however, he had no problem criticizing the activities of people close to Stalin; Vyacheslav Molotov, Lazar Kaganovich, Georgy Malenkov and Nikolai Bulganin for instance.

== Congress ==
Delegates from fraternal parties attended the congress, most notably CPSU Politburo member Leonid Brezhnev and Marshal Nie Rongzhen leading the delegation from the Chinese Communist Party. In his speech to the congress, Brezhnev congratulated the WPK on holding its 3rd Congress while telling them the new policies decided upon by the CPSU at the 20th Congress. He emphasized the importance of implementing the Leninist system of collective leadership within the party, from top to bottom, to strengthen the party. Nie Rongzhen on the other hand, congratulated the combine effort of the WPK and the Korean people in the reconstruction of the country in the aftermath of the Korean War.

Kim delivered a lengthy speech, but arguably one of the worst in his career according to Suh Dae-sook. In it, he condemned the former leaders of the domestic faction, talked at length about the economic situation, the North Korean position in international affairs and promoting the efforts of the partisans during the Japanese occupation of Korea, but he never mentioned the two most pressing subjects of the time; that of collective leadership and de-Stalinization. He claimed that the domestic faction were to blame for the failure of the Korean War, while in tandem reiterated that Koreans should read more history while continuing to claim that the partisan activities were the basis of North Korean culture and ideology. However, he went on to note that Korean nationalists such as Kim Kyu-sik and Kim Gu were patriots (he had condemned them at the 1st Congress). Yi Chong-won, one of the country's leading historians, spoke in favour of Kim Il Sung's suggestions after his speech, and claimed inaccurately that the partisans and Kim Il Sung had played the dominant role in liberating Korea from Japan. To elaborate his position even further, the Procurator General Yi Song-un told the delegates that there still existed people, who belonged to the domestic faction, who had not undergone proper self-criticism or still supported the overthrow of the existing party leadership.

Changes were made to the party's by-laws, with Pak Chong-ae presenting the changes to the congress. She told the delegates that the changes were made under influence from the 20th Congress of the CPSU. These amendments (as they were presented), were practically new by-laws. Three reasons for the amendments were given to the delegates; to facilitate the construction "of new socialism", to contribute and strengthen the party organization and change in accordance with other fraternal parties. The majority of her presentation dealt with how the new amendments would protect ordinary party members from high-standing officials; she pointed out by name the errors committed by Kim Yol and Pak Song-sam who she alleged had harassed party members. These new members were designed to protect ordinary members, however "there was little in the bylaws to substantiate such protection." In any case, by this point the party's by-laws were symbolic more than anything else, and Kim Il Sung and his partisan colleagues did not adhere to them.

According to Kim Il Sung the party had grown considerably since the 2nd Congress, having by the 3rd Congress 1,164,945 members in 58,529 cells. The party had grown despite the Korean War (with the majority of the growth occurring after the war), with an increase from the 2nd Congress by 439,183 members and 28,496 cells. The entire WPK membership represented 10 percent of the entire North Korean population.

The confusion which stemmed from the decisions of the 20th Congress of the CPSU were felt in the election of the 3rd Central Committee. Several Soviet Koreans still held high-standing party offices, including their informal leader Pak Chang-ok (who had been criticized by name on several occasions by Kim Il Sung), while prominent members of the Yanan faction "whose revolutionary activities had been ridiculed by Kim in the past were reelected". The same can be said of the domestic communists, several of them who were reelected were close to Pak Hon-yong (who had tried to overthrow Kim Il Sung the previous year), such as Ho Song-taek and Puk Mun-gyu. Despite this, Kim Il Sung managed to get many of his closest reelected to the Central Committee; 11 full members and 6 candidate members were partisans, but more importantly, of the six highest ranked Central Committee members, four of them were partisans (Kim Il Sung, Choe Yong-gun, Kim Il and Pak Kum-chol, the other two were Kim Tu-bong and Pak Chong-ae). Only 28 members were reelected to the 3rd Central Committee, 43 were new members and only five were promoted from candidate membership to full membership. 46 candidate members were elected to the 3rd Central Committee, of these two were reelected. None of the members of the 2nd Central Auditing Committee were reelected to the 3rd Central Auditing Committee.

== Plenums of the 3rd Central Committee ==
- August 1956 plenary session (30-31 August 1956)
- September 1956 plenary session (23 September 1956)
- December 1956 plenary session (11-13 December 1956)
- April 1957 plenary session (18-19 April 1957)
- October 1957 plenary session (17-19 October 1957)
- December 1957 enlarged plenary session (5-6 December 1957)
- June 1958 plenary session (5-7 June 1958)
- September 1958 plenary session (26-27 September 1958)
- February 1959 plenary session (23-25 February 1959)
- June 1959 plenary session (27-30 June 1959)
- December 1959 enlarged plenary session (1-4 December 1959)
- August 1960 plenary session (8-12 August 1960)
- December 1960 enlarged meeting and plenary session (20-23 December 1960)
- March 1961 plenary session (20-22 March 1961)

== Aftermath ==
The failure of not officially supporting the Soviet policies of collective leadership and de-Stalinization led to the August Incident, in which the Soviet Koreans and the Yanan faction tried to remove Kim Il Sung from power.
