= 3rd Central Auditing Committee of the Workers' Party of Korea =

The 3rd Central Auditing Committee (CAC) of the Workers' Party of Korea (WPK), officially the Central Auditing Committee of the 3rd Congress of the Workers' Party of Korea, was elected by the 3rd Congress on 29 April 1956.

== Members ==
Rank	Name	Hangul	2nd CAC	4th CAC	Office
1	Ri Chu-yon	리주연	Old	Demoted	Chairman of the WPK Central Auditing Commission.
2	Pak Hyo-sam	박효삼	New	Demoted	—
3	Pak Chang-sik	박창식	New	Demoted	—
4	Kim Kyo-yong	김교용	New	Demoted	—
5	Hwang Se-hwan	황세환	New	Demoted	—
6	Jong Ro-sik	정로식	New	Demoted	—
7	Hyon Chol-chong	현철종	New	Demoted	—
8	Kim Chang-hup	김창훈	New	Demoted	—
9	Yi Hui-jun	이희준	New	Demoted	—
10	Kim Min-san	김민산	New	Demoted	—
11	Kim Kye-rim	김계림	New	Reelected	Vice Chairman of the WPK Central Auditing Commission.
12	Yu Yon-hwa	유용화	Old	Demoted	Vice Chairman of the WPK Central Auditing Commission.
13	Chong Mok	목종	New	Demoted	—
14	Kim Yong-su	김용수	New	Demoted	—
15	Yi Sun-gun	이순군	New	Demoted	—
16	Cho Song-mo	조성모	New	Demoted	—
17	Ryu Mun-hwa	류문화	New	Demoted	—
