= 5th Central Auditing Committee of the Workers' Party of Korea =

The 5th Central Auditing Committee (CAC) of the Workers' Party of Korea (WPK), officially the Central Auditing Committee of the 5th Congress of the Workers' Party of Korea, was elected by the 5th Congress on 12 November 1970.

== Members ==
Rank	Name	Hangul	4th CAC	6th CAC	Office
1	Kim Se-hwal	김세활(金世活)	New	Demoted	Chairman of the WPK Central Auditing Commission.
2	Yu Chong-yol	유종열(류종렬)	New	Demoted	—
3	Chong Tu-hwan	정두환	New	Demoted	—
4	Ri Rak-bin	리락빈(李樂彬)	New	Reelected	Vice Chairman of the WPK Central Auditing Commission.
5	Kim Kum-chol	김금철	New	Demoted	—
6	Kim Tu-sam	김두삼	New	Demoted	—
7	Kim Hong-ok	김홍옥	New	Demoted	—
8	Om Sang-il	엄상일	New	Demoted	Vice Chairman of the WPK Central Auditing Commission.
9	Kim Chi-gu	김치구	New	Demoted	—
10	Choe Man-guk	최만국	New	Demoted	—
11	Chong Kyong-sik	정경식	New	Demoted	—
12	Kim Un-suk	김운숙(金雲淑)	New	Demoted	—
13	Yang Tae-gun	량태근	Old	Demoted	—
14	Kim Se-bong	김세봉	Old	Demoted	—
15	Song Kum-sun	송금순	New	Reelected	—
