= 4th Central Auditing Committee of the Workers' Party of Korea =

The 4th Central Auditing Committee (CAC) of the Workers' Party of Korea (WPK), officially the Central Auditing Committee of the 4th Congress of the Workers' Party of Korea, was elected by the 4th Congress on 19 September 1961.

== Members ==
| Rank | Name | Hangul | 3rd CAC | 5th CAC | Office |
|---|---|---|---|---|---|
| 1 | Kim Ryo-jung | 김려중(김여중) | New | Demoted | Chairman of the WPK Central Auditing Commission. |
| 2 | Kim Kye-rim | 김계림 | Old | Demoted | — |
| 3 | Song Yong | 송영 | New | Demoted | — |
| 4 | Yun Tae-hong | 윤태홍(尹泰洪) | New | Demoted | Vice Chairman of the WPK Central Auditing Commission. |
| 5 | Ri Pong-su | 리봉수(이봉수) | New | Demoted | — |
| 6 | Yim Chun-chu | 림춘추(임춘추) | New | Demoted | — |
| 7 | Kim Cha-rin | 김자린 | New | Demoted | — |
| 8 | Yang Tae-gun | 량태근(양태근) | New | Reelected | Vice Chairman of the WPK Central Auditing Commission. |
| 9 | Chong Tong-chol | 정동철 | New | Demoted | — |
| 10 | Kim Se-bong | 김세봉 | New | Reelected | — |
| 11 | Kim Kuk-hun | 김국훈 | New | Demoted | — |
| 12 | Pae Ki-jun | 배기준 | New | Demoted | — |
| 13 | Kang Sok-san | 강석산 | New | Demoted | — |
| 14 | Yi Ho-chol | 리호철(이호철) | New | Demoted | — |
| 15 | Kim Hong-ok | 김홍옥 | New | Demoted | — |
