= Ideology of the Workers' Party of Korea =

Officially, the Workers' Party of Korea (WPK) – the ruling party of North Korea (Democratic People's Republic of Korea) – is a communist party guided by Kimilsungism–Kimjongilism, a synthesis of the ideas of Kim Il Sung and Kim Jong Il. The party is committed to Juche, an ideology attributed to Kim Il Sung which promotes national independence and development through the efforts of the masses. Although Juche was originally presented as the Korean interpretation of Marxism–Leninism, the party now presents it as a freestanding philosophy of Kim Il Sung. The WPK recognizes the ruling Kim family as the ultimate source of its political thought. The fourth party conference, held in 2012, amended the party rules to state that Kimilsungism–Kimjongilism was "the only guiding idea of the party". Under Kim Jong Il, who governed as chairman of the National Defence Commission, communism was steadily removed from party and state documents in favour of Songun, or military-first politics. The military, rather than the working class, was established as the base of political power. However, Kim Jong Il's successor Kim Jong Un reversed this position in 2021, replacing Songun with "people-first politics" as the party's political method and reasserting the party's commitment to communism.

All references to Kimilsungism–Kimjongilism were officially removed from the Rules of the Workers' Party of Korea as amended at the 9th Congress of the Workers' Party of Korea in 2026. The move has been interpreted as a consequence of Kim Jong Un's policy shift away from his predecessors.

The WPK maintains a leftist image, and normally sends a delegation to the International Meeting of Communist and Workers' Parties, where it has some support. The WPK's party rules say it upholds "the revolutionary principles of Marxism–Leninism". However, a number of scholars argue that the WPK's ideology is better characterized as nationalist or far-right.

== Juche ==
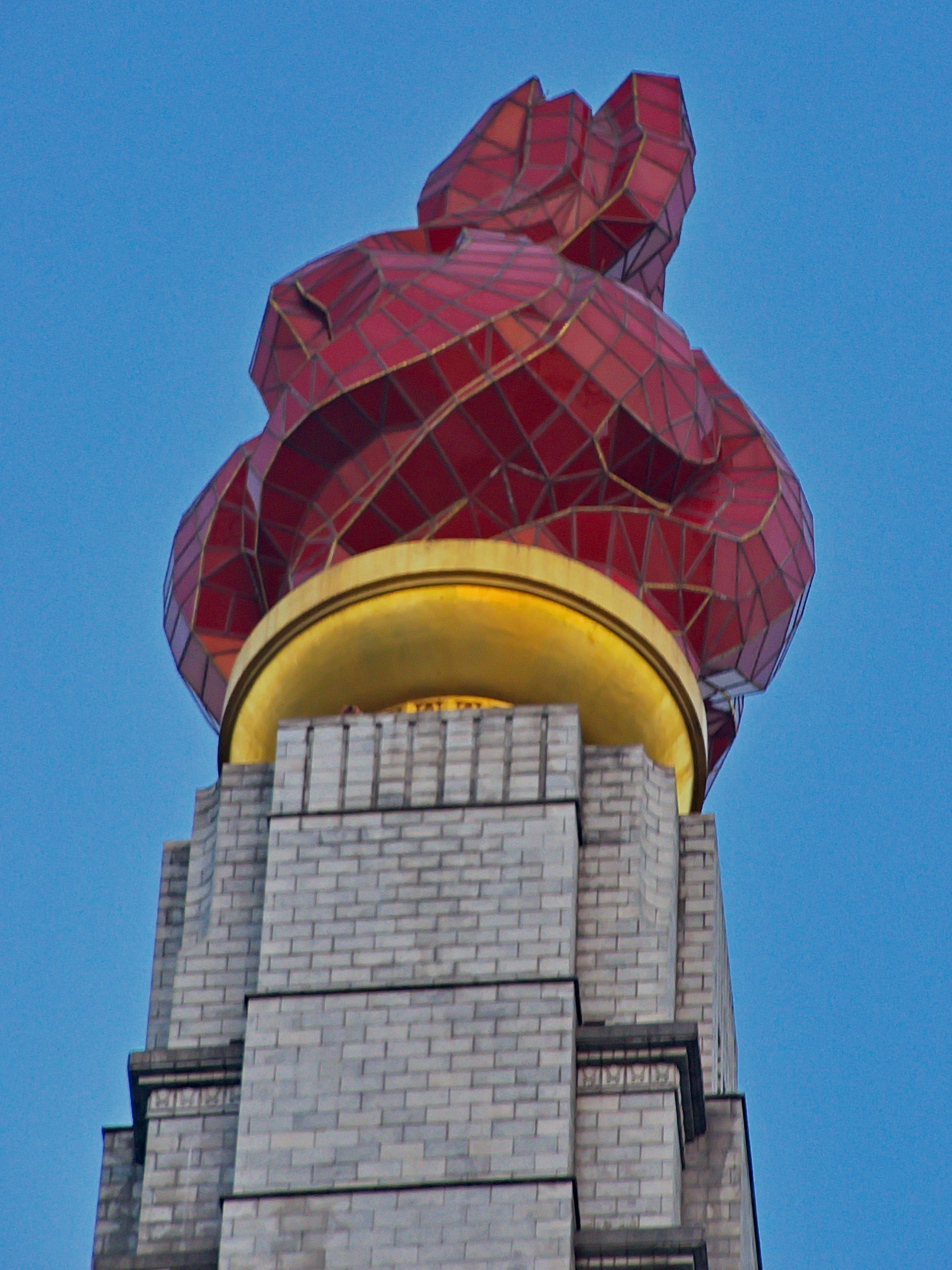
Torch symbolizing Juche at the top of the Juche Tower in Pyongyang

=== Relationship to Marxism–Leninism ===
Although the term "Juche" was first used in Kim Il Sung's speech (given in 1955), "On Eliminating Dogmatism and Formalism and Establishing Juche in Ideological Work", Juche as a coherent ideology did not develop until the 1960s. Similar to Stalinism, it led to the development of an unofficial (later formalized) ideological system defending the central party leadership. Until about 1972, Juche was called a "creative application" of Marxism–Leninism and "the Marxism–Leninism of today", and Kim Il Sung was hailed as "the greatest Marxist–Leninist of our time". However, by 1976 Juche had become a separate ideology; Kim Jong Il called it "a unique ideology, the contents and structures which cannot simply be described as Marxist–Leninist."

At the 5th Congress, Juche was elevated to the same level as Marxism–Leninism. It gained prominence during the 1970s, and at the 6th Congress in 1980, it was recognized as the WPK's sole ideology. During the following decade, Juche transformed from practical to pure ideology. On the Juche Idea, the primary text on Juche, was published in Kim Jong Il's name in 1982. Juche is, according to this study, inexorably linked with Kim Il Sung and "represents the guiding idea of the Korean Revolution ... we are confronted with the honourable task of modelling the whole society on the Juche idea". In the work, Kim Jong Il says that Juche is not simply a creative application of Marxism–Leninism but "a new era in the development of human history". The WPK's break with basic Marxist–Leninist premises is spelt out clearly in the article, "Let Us March Under the Banner of Marxism–Leninism and the Juche Idea".

Despite Juche's conception as a creative application of Marxism and Leninism, some scholars argue it has little direct connection to them. Policies may be explained without a Marxist or Leninist rationale, making the identification of specific influences from these ideologies difficult. Some analysts say it is easier to connect Juche with nationalism, but not a unique form of nationalism. Although the WPK claims to be socialist-patriotic, some analysts argue that its socialist patriotism is more similar to bourgeois nationalism; the chief difference is that socialist patriotism is nationalism within a socialist state. Juche developed as a reaction to foreign occupation, involvement and influence (primarily by the Chinese and Soviets) in North Korean affairs, and may be described "as a normal and healthy reaction of the Korean people to the deprivation they suffered under foreign domination." However, there is nothing uniquely Marxist or Leninist in this reaction; the primary reason for its description as "communist" is that it occurred in a self-proclaimed socialist state. The WPK (and the North Korean leadership in general) have not explained in detail how their policies are Marxist, Leninist or communist; Juche is defined as "Korean", and the others as "foreign".

=== Basic tenets ===
You requested me to give a detailed explanation of the Juche idea. But there is no end to it. All the policies and lines of our party emanate from the Juche idea and they embody this idea.

— Kim Il Sung, when asked by a Japanese interviewer to define Juche

Juche's primary objective for North Korea is political, economic and military independence. Kim Il Sung, in his "Let Us Defend the Revolutionary Spirit of Independence, Self-reliance, and Self-defense More Thoroughly in All Fields of State Activities" speech to the Supreme People's Assembly in 1967, summarized Juche:

The government of the republic will implement with all consistency the line of independence, self-sustenance, and self-defence to consolidate the political independence of the country (chaju), build up more solidly the foundations of an independent national economy capable of insuring the complete unification, independence, and prosperity of our nation (charip) and increasing the country's defence capabilities, to safeguard the security of the fatherland reliably by our own force (chawi), by splendidly embodying our Party's idea of Juche in all fields."

The principle of political independence known as chaju is one of Juche's central tenets. Juche stresses equality and mutual respect among nations, asserting that every state has the right to self-determination. In practice, the beliefs in self-determination and equal sovereignty have turned North Korea into a perceived "hermit kingdom". As interpreted by the WPK, yielding to foreign pressure or intervention would violate chaju and threaten the country's ability to defend its sovereignty. This may explain why Kim Jong Il believed that the Korean revolution would fail if North Korea became dependent on a foreign entity.

Regarding China and the Soviet Union, Kim Il Sung advocated for cooperation and mutual support, acknowledging that it was essential for North Korea to learn from the experiences of other countries. Despite this, he abhorred the idea that North Korea should depend on the two nations and did not want to follow their example dogmatically. Kim Il Sung said that the WPK needed to "resolutely repudiate the tendency to swallow things of others undigested or imitate them mechanically", attributing the success of North Korea to the WPK's independence in implementing policies. To ensure North Korean independence, official pronouncements stressed the need for the people to unite under the WPK and the Great Leader.

Economic independence (charip) is seen as the material basis of chaju. One of Kim Il Sung's greatest fears was North Korea's dependence on foreign aid; he believed it would threaten the country's ability to develop socialism, which could only be achieved by a state with a strong, independent economy. Charip emphasizes an independent national economy based on heavy industry; this sector, in theory, would then drive the rest of the economy. Kim Jong Il said:

Building an independent national economy means building an economy which is free from dependence on others and which stands on its own feet, an economy which serves one's own people and develops on the strength of the resources of one's own country and by the efforts of one's people.

Kim Il Sung considered military independence (chawi) crucial. Acknowledging that North Korea might need military support in a war against imperialist enemies, he emphasized a domestic response and summed up the party's (and state's) attitude towards military confrontation: "We do not want war, nor are we afraid of it, nor do we beg peace from the imperialists."

According to Juche, because of his consciousness, man has ultimate control over himself and the ability to change the world. This differs from classical Marxism, which believes that humans depend on their relationship to the means of production more than on themselves. The Juche view of a revolution led by a Great Leader, rather than a group of knowledgeable revolutionaries, is a break from Lenin's concept of a vanguard party.

== Songun ==
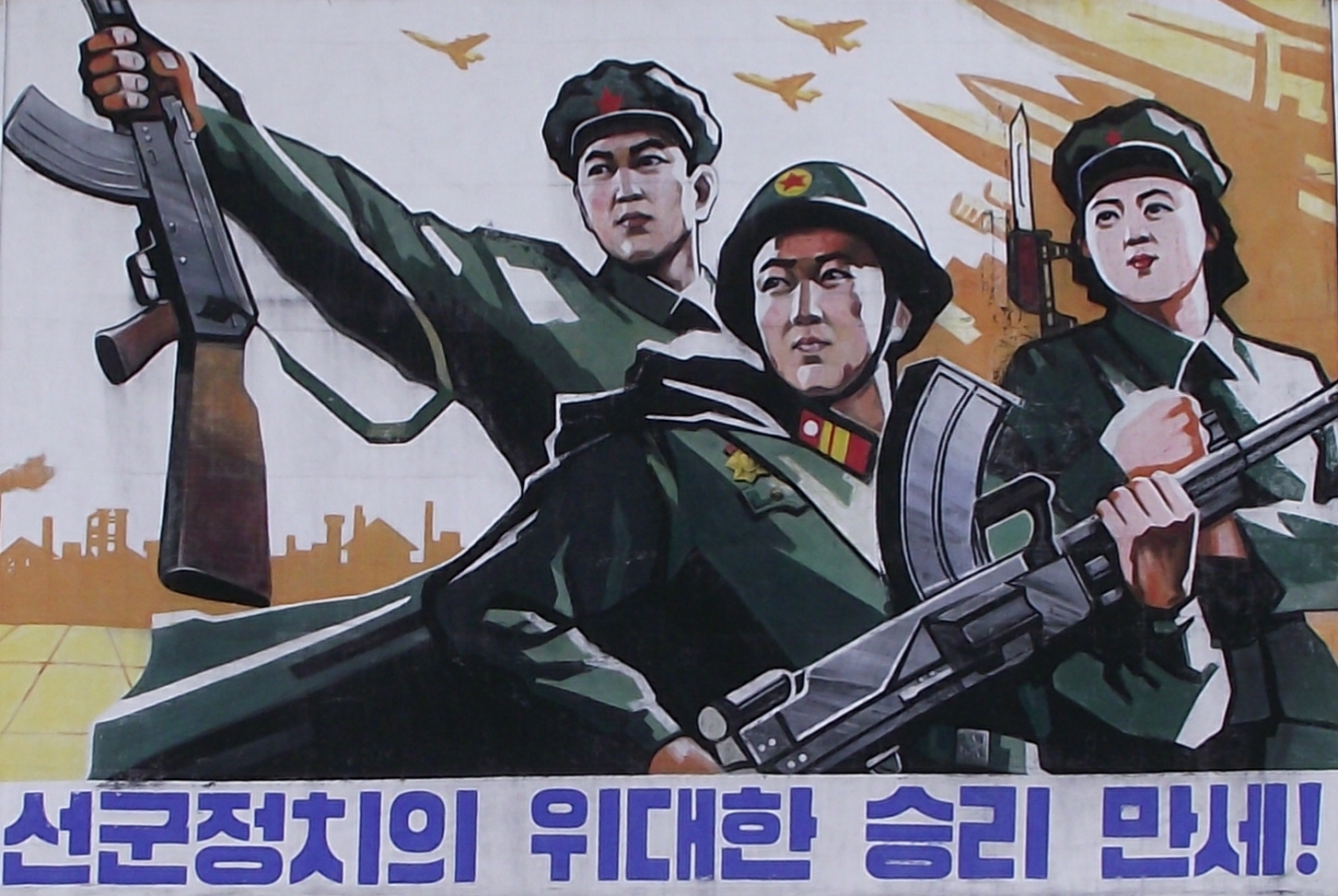
Propaganda art promoting Songun. The Korean text reads, "Long live the great victory of military-first (Songun) politics!"

Songun (선군정치; sŏn'gun chŏngch'i; 'military-first politics') was first mentioned on 7 April 1997 in Rodong Sinmun under the headline "There Is a Victory for Socialism in the Guns and Bombs of the People's Army" (인민군대의 총창우에 사회주의의 승리가 있다). Its description in the article echoed the military-centered thinking of the time: "[Songun is] the revolutionary philosophy to safeguard our own style of socialism under any circumstances". The concept was credited to Kim Jong Il, who posited that Songun was the next stage of development of Juche.

A joint editorial entitled "Our Party's Military-First Politics Will Inevitably Achieve Victory and Will Never Be Defeated" (우리 당의 선군정치는 필승불패이다) was published by Kulloja and Rodong Sinmun (the WPK's theoretical magazine and newspaper, respectively) on 16 June 1999. In it, it was stated that Songun meant "the leadership method under the principle of giving priority to the military and resolving the problems that may occur in the course of revolution and construction as well as establishing the military as the main body of the revolution in the course of achieving the total tasks of socialism". While the article often referred to "our Party", this was not a reference to the WPK but rather to the personal leadership of Kim Jong Il.

The National Defence Commission, the highest military body, was designated the supreme body of the state by a 1998 revision of the North Korean Constitution. The Songun era is considered to have begun with this revision.

In late 2021, Kim Jong Un declared that the "military-first" politics of Songun would be replaced by "people-first politics" (인민대중제일주의) guided by himself.

== Suryong ==
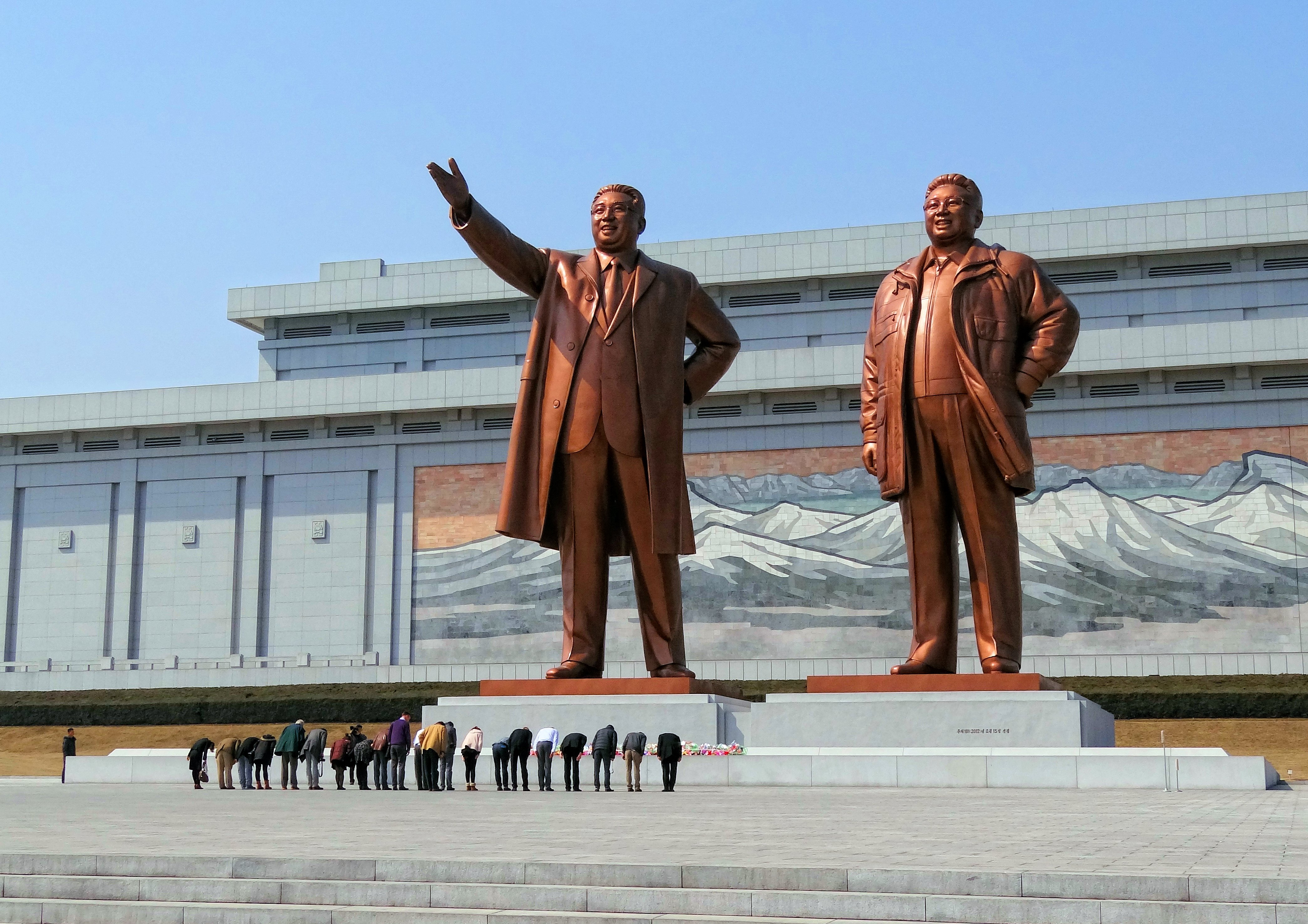
Visitors of the Mansu Hill Grand Monument in Pyongyang bow to massive bronze statues of Kim Il Sung and Kim Jong Il.

Suryong (수령형상창조; suryŏng hyŏngsang ch'angjo; 'creation of the lead figure') is a revolutionary theory concerning the relationship between leadership and society. Unlike Marxism–Leninism, which considers developments in the material conditions of production and exchange as the driving force of historical progress (known as historical materialism), Juche considers human beings in general the driving force in history. It is summarized as "the popular masses are placed in the center of everything, and the leader is the center of the masses". Juche, North Korea maintains, is a "man-centered ideology" in which "man is the master of everything and decides everything". In contrast to Marxism–Leninism, in which a people's decisions are conditioned by their relations to the means of production, Juche argues that people's decisions take consideration of, but are independent from, external factors. Just like Marxism–Leninism, Juche believes history is law-governed, but that it is only man who drives progress, stating that "the popular masses are the drivers of history". The process for the masses to reach consciousness, independence, and creativity requires the "leadership of a great leader". Marxism–Leninism argues that the popular masses will lead (on the basis of their relation to production), but in North Korea the role of a correct leadership is required to organize a unified and effective group. South Korean political scientist Lee Kyo-duk argues that Suryong helped Kim Il Sung establish a unitary system over North Korea.

The theory posits that the leader plays a decisive role as an absolute, supreme leader. The leader is like the brain of the working class, who is the driving force of revolution. The leader is also a flawless human being who never makes mistakes, guiding the masses. The popular masses are the driving force of history, but they require the guidance of the party leadership.

== Kimilsungism–Kimjongilism ==
Kimilsungism (김일성주의) and the Ten Principles for the Establishment of a Monolithic Ideological System were formally introduced by Kim Jong Il in 1974. Kim Jong Il reportedly did so to strengthen his position within the WPK, taking advantage of his father's political supremacy. Kimilsungism refers to the ideas of Kim Il Sung, while the Ten Principles serve as a guide for North Korean political and social life. Kim Jong Il argued that his father's ideas had evolved and they therefore deserved their own distinct name. North Korean state media had previously described Kim Il Sung's ideas as "contemporary Marxism–Leninism"; by calling them "Kimilsungism", Kim Jong Il sought to elevate the ideas of his father to the same level of prestige as Stalinism and Maoism. Not long after the introduction of "Kimilsungism" into the North Korean lexicon, Kim Jong Il began calling for a "Kimilsungist transformation" of North Korean society.

Political analyst Lim Jae-cheon argues that there is no discernible difference between Kimilsungism and Juche, and that the two terms are interchangeable. However, in his 1976 speech "On Correctly Understanding the Originality of Kimilsungism", Kim Jong Il said that Kimilsungism comprises the "Juche idea and a far-reaching revolutionary theory and leadership method evolved from this idea". He further added, "Kimilsungism is an original idea that cannot be explained within the frameworks of Marxism–Leninism. The Juche idea, which constitutes the quintessence of Kimilsungism, is an idea newly discovered in the history of mankind". He also stated that Marxism–Leninism had become obsolete and needed to be replaced by Kimilsungism:

The revolutionary theory of Kimilsungism is a revolutionary theory which has provided solutions to problems arising in the revolutionary practice in a new age different from the era that gave rise to Marxism–Leninism. On the basis of Juche idea, the leader gave a profound explanation of the theories, strategies and tactics of national liberation, class emancipation and human liberations in our era. Thus, it can be said that the revolutionary theory of Kimilsungism is a perfect revolutionary theory of Communism in the era of Juche.

According to analyst Shin Gi-wook, the ideas of Juche and Kimilsungism are in essence the "expressions of North Korean particularism over supposedly more universalistic Marxism–Leninism". The new terminology signalled a move from socialism to nationalism. This was evident in a speech presented by Kim Jong Il in 1982, during celebrations of his father's 70th birthday, in which he stated that love for the nation came before love for socialism. This particularism gave birth to concepts such as "A Theory of the Korean Nation as Number One" (조선민족제일주의) and "Socialism of Our Style" (우리식사회주의).

Following the death of Kim Jong Il in December 2011, Kimilsungism became Kimilsungism–Kimjongilism (김일성-김정일주의) at the 4th Conference of the Workers' Party of Korea in April 2012. Party members at the conference stated that the WPK was "the party of Kim Il Sung and Kim Jong Il" and declared Kimilsungism–Kimjongilism "the only guiding idea of the party". Afterwards, the Korean Central News Agency (KCNA) stated that "the Korean people have long called the revolutionary policies ideas of the President [Kim Il Sung] and Kim Jong Il as Kimilsungism–Kimjongilism and recognized it as the guiding of the nation". Kim Jong Un, the son of Kim Jong Il who succeeded him as leader of the WPK, said:

Kimilsungism–Kimjongilism is an integral system of the idea, theory and method of Juche and a great revolutionary ideology representative of the Juche era. Guided by Kimilsungism–Kimjongilism, we should conduct Party building and Party activities, so as to sustain the revolutionary character of our Party and advance the revolution and construction in line with the ideas and intentions of the President [Kim Il Sung] and the General [Kim Jong Il].

Naenara, the official web portal of the North Korean government, declares: "The Democratic People's Republic of Korea is an independent socialist state guided by the great Kimilsungism–Kimjongilism in its activities."

All references to Kimilsungism–Kimjongilism were officially removed from the Rules of the Workers' Party of Korea as amended at the 9th Congress of the Workers' Party of Korea in 2026.

== Kimjongunism ==
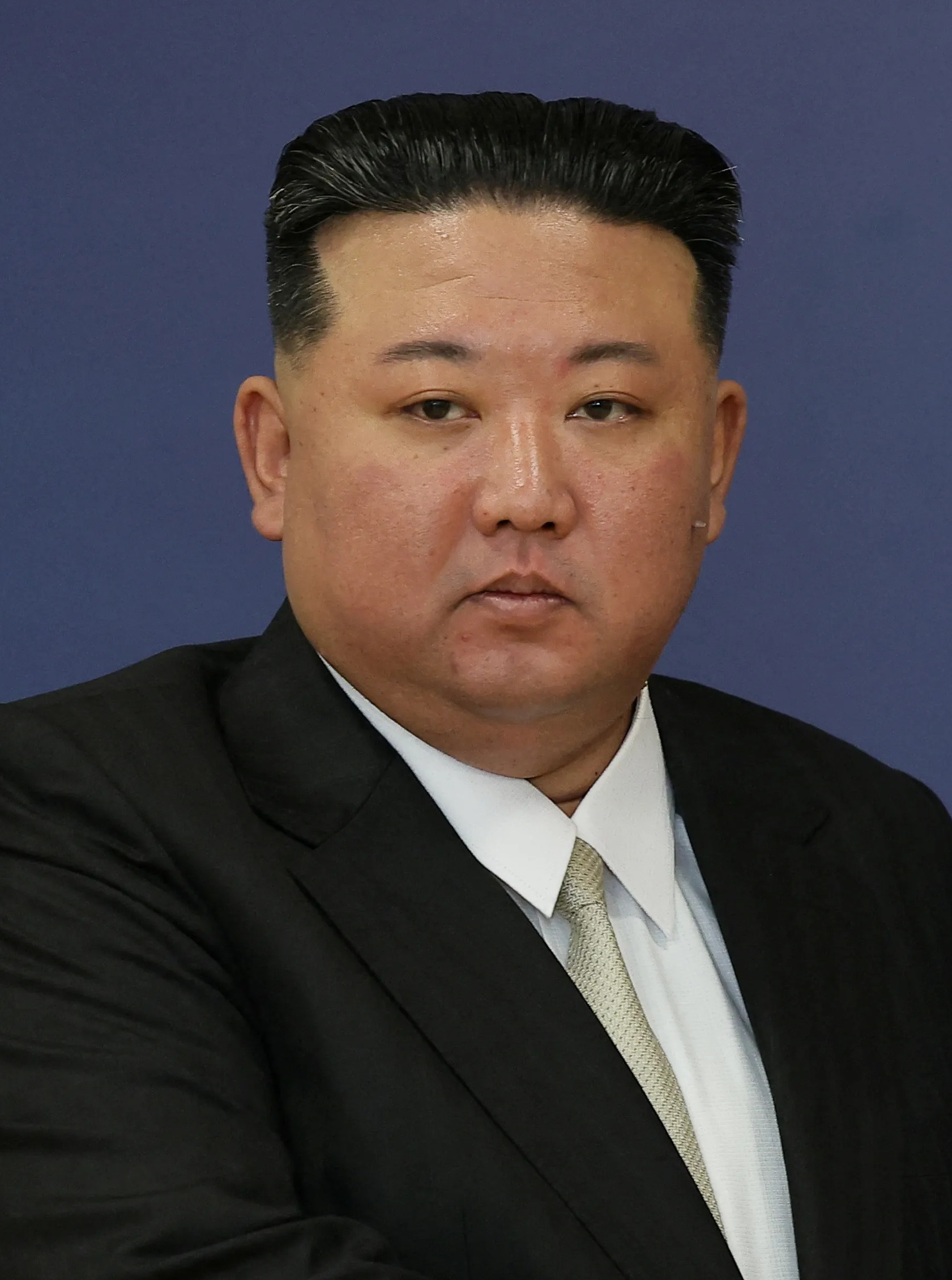
Kim Jong Un in 2023

In late 2021, South Korea's National Intelligence Service (NIS) reported to the country's legislature that Kim Jong Un had begun using the neologism "Kimjongunism" (김정은주의) to promote his own ideas and importance as opposed to those of his father and grandfather. However, as of 2023, the term has yet to appear in any major state or party publication, such as the Rodong Sinmun.

Prior to the 2021 briefing by the NIS, Kim Jong Un had made several moves to cement his political primacy, including appointing himself general secretary of the WPK (a title previously reserved as a posthumous designation for Kim Jong Il), removing portraits of his father and grandfather from important party buildings (such as the interior of the April 25 House of Culture), and adding the term "Kim Jong Un's Revolutionary Thought" (김정은의 혁명사상) to the party rules. A number of South Korean and Western political analysts argue that these actions indicated Kim Jong Un's desire to form his own legacy, separate from that of his predecessors. Major elements of Kim Jong Un's ideological shift include his emphasis on North Korea's nuclear weapons program and his reassertion of the WPK's commitment to communism.

== Nationalism ==
Karl Marx and Friedrich Engels did not clarify the difference between the state and law, focusing on class divisions within nations. They argued that nation and law (as it existed then) would be overthrown and replaced by proletarian rule. This was the mainstream view of Soviet theoreticians during the 1920s; however, with Stalin at the helm in 1929, it was under attack. He criticized Nikolai Bukharin's position that the proletariat was hostile to the inclinations of the state, arguing that since the state (the Soviet Union) was in transition from capitalism to socialism the relationship between the state and the proletariat was harmonious. By 1936, Stalin argued that the state would still exist if the Soviet Union reached the communist mode of production but the socialist world was encircled by capitalist forces. Kim Il Sung took this position to its logical conclusion, arguing that the state would exist after North Korea reached the communist mode of production until a future world revolution. As long as capitalism survived, even if the socialist world predominated, North Korea could still be threatened by the restoration of capitalism.

The revival of the term "state" in the Soviet Union under Stalin led to the revival of the term "nation" in North Korea under Kim Il Sung. Despite official assertions that the Soviet Union was based on "class" rather than "state", the latter was revived during the 1930s. In 1955, Kim Il Sung expressed a similar view in his speech, "On Eliminating Dogmatism and Formalism and Establishing Juche in Ideological Work":

What we are doing now is not a revolution in some foreign country but our Korean revolution. Therefore, every ideological action must benefit the Korean revolution. To fulfil the Korean revolution, one should be perfectly cognizant of the history of our national struggle, of Korea's geography, and our customs.

From then on, he and the WPK stressed the roles of "revolutionary tradition" and Korea's cultural tradition in its revolution. At party meetings, members and cadres learned about North Korea's national prestige and its coming rejuvenation. Traditional customs were revived, to showcase Korean-ness. By 1965, Kim Il Sung stated that if communists continued opposing individuality and sovereignty, the movement would be threatened by dogmatism and revisionism. He criticized those communists who, he believed, subscribed to "national nihilism by praising all things foreign and vilifying all things national" and tried to impose foreign models on their own country. By the 1960s, Juche was a full-fledged ideology calling for a distinct path for North Korean socialist construction and non-interference in its affairs; however, a decade later it was defined as a system whose "fundamental principle was the realization of sovereignty".

Although WPK theoreticians were initially hostile towards the terms "nation" and "nationalism" because of the influence of the Stalinist definition of "state", by the mid-1960s their definition that a nation was a "a stable, historically formed community of people based on common language, territory, economic life, and culture" was revised and the characteristic of a "shared bloodline" was added to the definition. During the 1980s a common economic life was removed from the definition, with shared bloodline receiving increased emphasis. The WPK revised the meaning of nationalism in response to the democratic transition in South Korea and the dissolution of the Soviet Union. Previously defined in Stalinist terms as a bourgeois weapon to exploit the workers, nationalism changed from a reactionary to a progressive idea. Kim Il Sung differentiated "nationalism" from what he called "genuine nationalism"; while genuine nationalism was a progressive idea, nationalism remained reactionary:

True nationalism (genuine nationalism) is similar to patriotism. Only a genuine patriot can become a devoted and true internationalist. In this sense, when I say communist, at the same time, I mean nationalist and internationalist.

The WPK historically promoted Korean nationalism and eventual reunification of the two Koreas. In 2023, Kim Jong Un officially declared that North Korea was abandoning reunification as a goal and declared the relationship between North as South Korea as one of "two hostile states". He stated "the party's comprehensive conclusion after reviewing inter-Korean relations is that reunification can never be achieved with those Republic of Korea riffraffs that defined the 'unification by absorption' and 'unification under liberal democracy' as their state policy", which he said is in "sharp contradiction with what our line of national reunification was: one nation, one state with two systems".

=== Allegations of xenophobia and racism ===
Whatever the name and however elaborate his claim, Kim's Juche idea is nothing more than xenophobic nationalism that has little relevance to communism.

— Dae-Sook Suh, author of Kim Il Sung: The North Korean Leader

During the 1960s the WPK began forcing ethnic Koreans to divorce their European spouses (who were primarily from the Eastern Bloc), with a high-ranking WPK official calling the marriages "a crime against the Korean race" and Eastern Bloc embassies in the country beginning to accuse the regime of fascism. In May 1963, a Soviet diplomat described Kim Il Sung's political circle as a "political Gestapo". Similar remarks were made by other Eastern Bloc officials in North Korea, with the East German ambassador calling the policy "Goebbelsian". Although this was said during a low point in relations between North Korea and the Eastern Bloc, it illustrated a perception of racism in Kim Il Sung's policies. North Korea's position on mixed marriages was inconsistent, however; it took a more permissive attitude towards Japanese spouses of Koreans repatriated from Japan as well as Chinese people in North Korea.

In his book The Cleanest Race (2010), Brian Reynolds Myers dismisses the idea that Juche is North Korea's leading ideology. He views its public exaltation as being designed to deceive foreigners; it exists to be praised rather than followed. Myers writes that Juche is a sham ideology, developed to extol Kim Il Sung as a political thinker comparable to Mao Zedong. According to Myers, North Korean military-first policy, racism and xenophobia (exemplified by race-based incidents such as the attempted lynching of black Cuban diplomats and forced abortions for North Korean women who got pregnant with Chinese men) indicate a base in far-right politics (inherited from Imperial Japan during its colonial occupation of Korea) rather than the far-left.

According to North Korea analyst Fyodor Tertitskiy, North Korean propaganda has "never asserted that Koreans are biologically superior" and that in fact, "such a statement was always directly condemned by Kim Jong Il". Instead, "the greatness of the Korean people lies solely in their leader. Koreans are great because they are led by Kim Il Sung, not for any other reason". He adds that while those in academia often try to create a logical worldview, having not received proper education, someone like Kim Il Sung's worldview would be "full of contradictions and logical holes", and that "Trying to explain his pattern of thinking and ruling the country with a simple theory – “the DPRK is a racist state,” “the DPRK is a traditional monarchy,” “the DPRK is a carbon copy of the USSR” – would be a distortion of the facts", especially since researchers who come to such conclusions would start to dismiss facts contradicting that conclusion. Tertitskiy also notes that North Korea gives very little weight to racial and nationalist element in its propaganda compared to the cult of personality around its leaders.

== North Korean class analysis ==
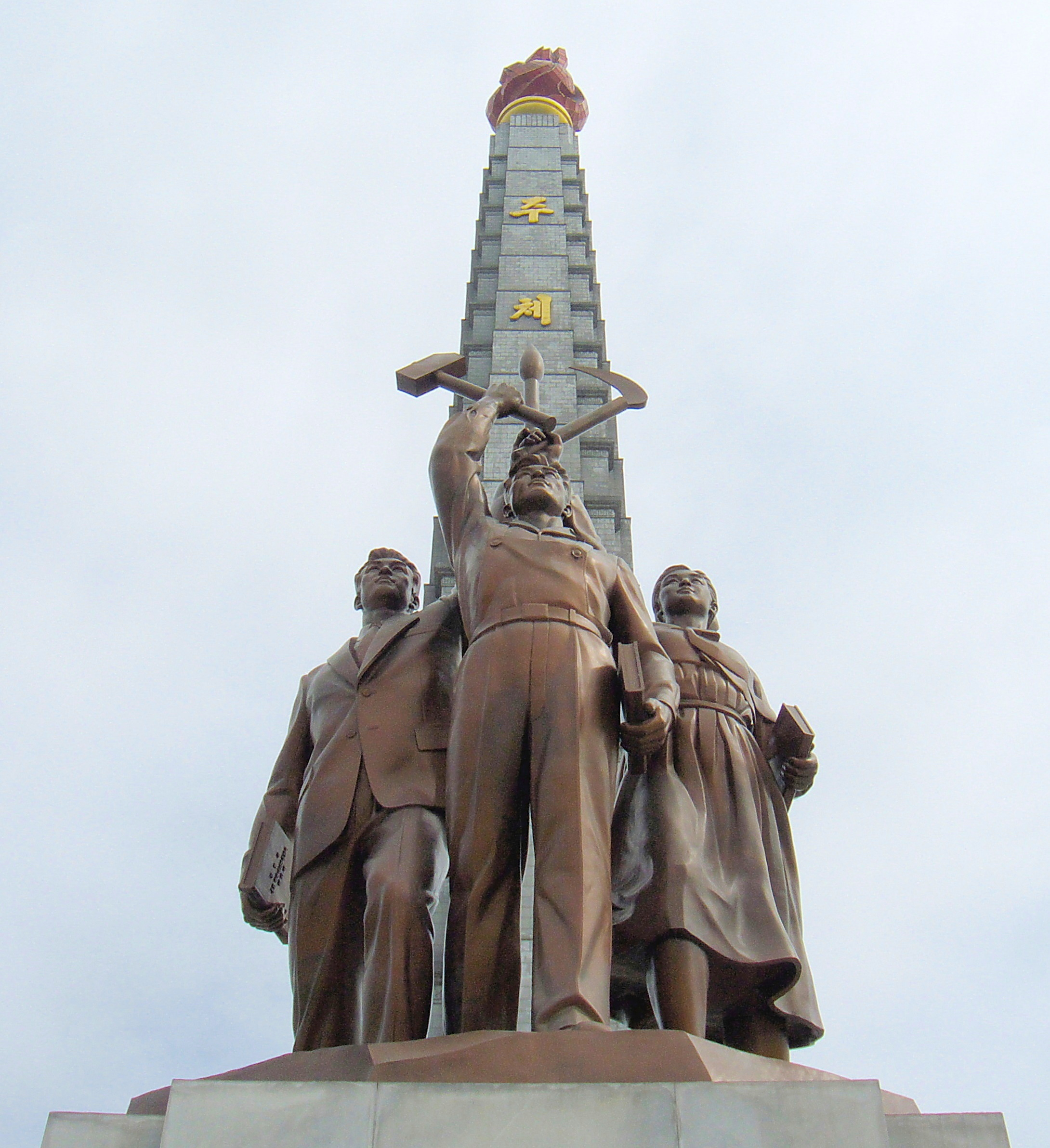
The three figures in front of the Juche Tower in Pyongyang represent the three classes of Korean society, as described by the Workers' Party of Korea: the industrial workers, the peasants, and the samuwon (the intelligentsia and the petite bourgeoisie).

Unlike the Joseon dynasty, where there was a huge gap between the upper and lower classes, the North Korean government developed the concept of a gathered-together "people". Instead of a strict social hierarchy, the North Korean government divided the country's population into three classes – the industrial workers, the peasants, and the samuwon (사무원) – North Korea is a society in which all three classes are considered equally important. The samuwon class consists of the intelligentsia and the petite bourgeoisie, such as clerks, small traders, bureaucrats, professors and writers. This class is unique to North Korean class analysis and it was conceptualized in order to increase the rates of education and literacy among the country's population.

Normally, Marxist–Leninist states would only value the farmers or the labourers, thus, in the Soviet Union, the intelligentsia was not defined as an independent class of its own. Instead, it was defined as a "social stratum" that recruited itself from members of almost all classes: the proletariat, the petite bourgeoisie and the bourgeoisie. However, a "peasant intelligentsia" was never mentioned, and the "proletarian intelligentsia" was exalted because it consisted of progressive scientists and communist theoreticians, but the "bourgeois intelligentsia" was condemned for producing "bourgeois ideologies", i.e. non-Marxist–Leninist ideologies.

North Koreans believed in achieving rapid industrialization through labour and by subjecting nature to human will. By restructuring social classes into a mass of people who are all theoretically equal, the North Korean government claimed that it would be able to attain self-reliance in upcoming years. However, this assertion has been questioned by foreign observers because of the country's severe food shortages and consequent dependence on foreign aid.

== Socialism of Our Style ==
"Socialism of Our Style" (우리식사회주의), also referred to as "Korean-style socialism" and "our-style socialism" within North Korea, is an ideological concept Kim Jong Il introduced on 27 December 1990 in the speech "Socialism of Our Country is a Socialism of Our Style as Embodied by the Juche Idea" (우리 나라 사회주의는 주체 사상을 구현한 우리식 사회주의이다). Speaking after the Revolutions of 1989 that brought down the Eastern Bloc countries, Kim Jong Il explicitly stated that North Korea needed – and survived because of – Socialism of Our Style. He argued that socialism in Eastern Europe failed because they "imitated the Soviet experience in a mechanical manner". According to Kim, they failed to understand that the Soviet experience was based on specific historical and social circumstances and could not be used by other countries aside from the Soviet Union itself. He added that "if experience is considered absolute and accepted dogmatically it is impossible to build Socialism properly, as the times change and the specific situation of each country is different from another". Kim Jong Il went on to criticize "dogmatic application" of Marxism–Leninism, stating:

Marxism–Leninism presented a series of opinions on building of Socialism and Communism, but it confined itself to presupposition and hypothesis owing to the limitations of the conditions of their ages and practical experiences ... But many countries applied the principles of Marxist–Leninist materialistic conception of history dogmatically, failing to advance revolution continually after the establishment of the socialist system.

North Korea would not encounter such difficulties because of the conceiving of Juche. In his words, North Korea was "a backward, colonial semifeudal society" when the communists took over, but since the North Korean communists did not accept Marxism, which was based on European experiences with capitalism, or Leninism, which was based on Russia's experience, they conceived of Juche. He believed that the situation in North Korea was more complex because of the American presence in nearby South Korea. Thanks to Kim Il Sung, Kim Jong Il argued, the revolution had "put forward original lines and policies suited to our people's aspirations and the specific situation of our country". "The Juche idea is a revolutionary theory which occupies the highest stage of development of the revolutionary ideology of the working class", Kim Jong Il said, further stating that the originality and superiority of the Juche idea defined and strengthened Korean socialism. He then conceded by stating that Socialism of Our Style was "a man-centered Socialism", explicitly making a break with basic Marxist–Leninist thought, which argues that material forces are the driving force of historical progress, not people. Socialism of Our Style was presented as an organic sociopolitical theory, using the language of Marxism–Leninism, saying:

The political and ideological might of the motive force of revolution is nothing but the power of single-hearted unity between the leader, the Party, and the masses. In our socialist society, the leader, the Party, and the masses throw in their lot with one another, forming a single socio-political organism. The consolidation of blood relations between the leader, the Party and the masses is guaranteed by the single ideology and united leadership.

== See also ==
- Ideology of the Chinese Communist Party
- Ideology of the Communist Party of the Soviet Union
