= 7th Central Auditing Commission of the Workers' Party of Korea =

The 7th Central Auditing Commission of the Workers' Party of Korea (Korean: 제7기 조선로동당 중앙감사위원회) was elected at the party's 7th Congress on 9 May 2016. In its 1st Plenary Session it elected Choe Sung-ho as Chair and Pak Myong-sun as Vice Chair.

== Leadership ==
- Chairman: Choe Sung-ho
- Vice Chairwoman: Pak Myong-sun, until 11 April 2020

== Plenary meetings ==
- 1st Plenary Meeting: 9 May 2016

== Members ==
The following were elected as members of the 8th Central Auditing Commission.

The names of members are listed according to the order of their election at the 1st plenary meeting of the 8th Central Committee. Members who have an en dash (—) in the Rank column were by-elected during the term of the 8th Central Committee.

Rank	Name	Korean	6th (Note: Status in the 6th Central Auditing Commission at the 3rd Conference.)	8th (Note: Status in the 8th Central Auditing Commission at the start of its term.)
1	Choe Sung-ho	최승호	No	No
2	Pak Myong-sun (Note: Pak Myong-sun was by-elected as a member of the Central Committee on 11 April 2020.)	박명순	Yes	No
3	Kim Kyong-nam	김경남	No	No
4	Hwang Chol-sik	황철식	No	No
5	Kim Yong-chol	김용철	No	No
6	Ri Yong-ik	리영익	No	No
7	Kim Myong-hun	김명훈	No	No
8	Kye Yong-sam	계영삼	Yes	No
9	Jo Jong-ho	조정호	No	No
10	Kye Myong-chol	계명철	No	No
11	Jang Jong-ju	장정주	Yes	No
12	Pho Hui-song	포희성	No	No
13	Jong Pong-sok	정봉석	Yes	No
14	Choe Kwon-su	최권수	Yes	No
15	Ho Kwang-uk	허광욱	Yes	No
—	So Chang-ryong (Note: So Chang-ryong was by-elected as a member on 10 April 2019.)	서창룡	No	No
—	Pak Yong-jin (Note: Pak Yong-jin was by-elected as a member on 11 April 2020.)	박영진	No	No
