= 7th Congress of the Workers' Party of Korea =

2016 party conference in North Korea

- The flag of the Workers' Party of Korea
- Date: 6–9 May 2016 (3 days)
- Location: April 25 House of Culture, Pyongyang, North Korea
- Participants: 3,467 delegates
- Outcome: Election of the Party Chairman, 7th Central Committee and 7th Central Auditing Commission

- 7th Congress of the Workers' Party of Korea
- Hangul: 조선로동당 제7차 대회
- Hanja: 朝鮮勞動黨 第7次 大會
- RR: Joseon rodongdang je7cha daehoe
- MR: Chosŏn rodongdang che7ch'a taehoe

The 7th Congress of the Workers' Party of Korea (WPK) was held in the April 25 House of Culture in Pyongyang, North Korea, from 6 to 9 May 2016. The congress is the highest organ of the party, and is stipulated to be held every four years. 3,467 delegates represented the party's membership. The congress saw the appointment of Kim Jong Un as WPK leader, with the title changed from First Secretary to Chairman. It was the first party congress convened since 1980.

== Background ==
The 7th Congress was the first Congress of the Workers' Party of Korea held since the 6th Congress in 1980, under the rule of Kim Il Sung. Following the 6th Congress, Kim Il Sung made some references to a future 7th Congress which would only be convened should certain economic objectives were achieved. In August 1981, in a speech to secretaries of the WPK Central Committee titled On Directions of the Writing of Next Year’s People’s Economic Plan, Kim called on for the renovation of the Three Revolutions Exhibition to start in the first half of 1983 and to be finished before the 7th Congress. On 28 December 1981, he gave a speech to cadres from sectors related to light industry titled On Producing More Good Quality People’s Consumer Goods, where he called for a "revolution in light industry" to bring North Korea's consumer produce up to a "global standard" before the 7th Congress. In February 1982, he further called for a "revolution in services" before the Congress. in a speech to scientists at the Academy of Scientists in March 1982, he said every scientist should learn at least one foreign language before the Congress.

In late June and early July 1983, Kim gave remarks to the Peru American People’s Revolutionary Alliance entitled On the Struggle of the Korean People to Realize the Juche Idea, he said the Congress would be held in "the near future, before saying that North Korea would reach the goals of the Ten Prospective Goals in 1985 and hold the 7th Congress in 1986. However, in late December 1983, Kim gave a speech to the WPK Politburo titled On Forming a Revolutionary Worldview Amongst Officials, where he said the Congress "could be delayed" to raise the standard of living of the people and that it would be a "disgrace" to hold such an event without "shops filled with products". He made similar remarks to the Cabinet in early 1984. Kim told the Politburo in April 1985 that the revolutions in light industry and services would need to be achieved in 1986 or 1987 and then the 7th Congress would convoke. The last time Kim mentioned the Congress was on April 1985. In 2010 the party rules stipulation that Congresses be held every five years was dropped, recognising this had been ignored for thirty years. As such, there were no Congresses held under Kim Jong Il's tenure.

The purpose of the Congress was to review the party's work from the time period since the 6th Congress, but also to instill public loyalty toward the leadership of the country. On 30 October 2015, the Korean Central News Agency (KCNA) reported that the Political Bureau of the Central Committee of the Workers' Party of Korea announced a decision to hold a Congress in early May 2016, saying:

The Political Bureau of the WPK Central Committee decides to convene the 7th Congress of the WPK early in May Juche 105 (2016), reflecting the demand of the party and the developing revolution that witness epoch-making changes in accomplishing the revolutionary cause of Juche, the cause of building a thriving socialist nation.

== Preparations ==
On 17 February 2016, joint slogans were issued by Workers' Party of Korea's Central Military Commission and Central Committee, and they were published by Rodong Sinmun and KCNA.

The Congress was preceded by a "70-day battle" mass mobilization campaign. Human Rights Watch claimed that the campaign meant uncompensated and forced labor for people across the country, including children, and that the object of the campaign was to boost outputs in manufacture and agriculture and demonstrate loyalty. A five-day holiday was declared for the duration of the Congress.

== Congress ==
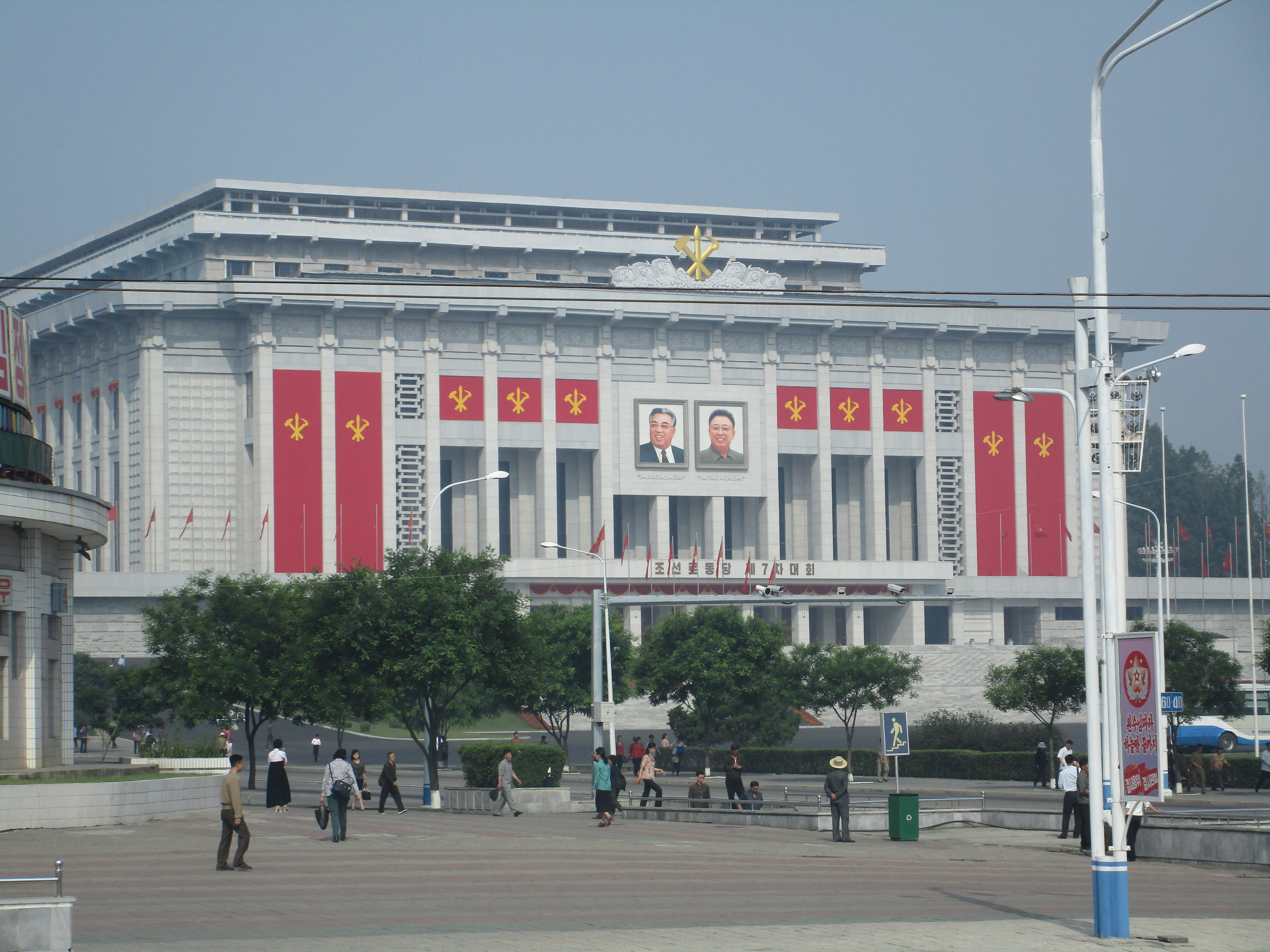
April 25 House of Culture decorated for the Congress

The Congress was opened on 6 May 2016 at the April 25 House of Culture in Pyongyang, in the presence of 3,467 voting delegates. Unlike the last congress, there were no major foreign delegations, but 128 foreign journalists from 12 countries were allowed to cover the event. Reporters were kept outside of the venue, and a recording of the opening event was only televised later in the evening.

The Congress opened with an address by Kim Jong Un. In it, he praised the country's January 2016 nuclear test and satellite launch. After having chosen its presidium and secretariat, the Congress approved its agenda:

1. Review of the work of the 6th Central Committee
2. Review of the work of the 6th Central Auditing Commission
3. Revision of the WPK Charter
4. Election of Kim Jong Un to the leadership of the WPK
5. Election of members to the central leadership organs of the WPK

The Congress continued on 7 May with Kim Jong Un's report on the work of the 6th Central Committee. In the report, Kim Jong Un reiterated the country's nuclear policy, calling it "a responsible nuclear weapons state". According to Kim, North Korea would not use nuclear weapons unless its sovereignty was violated. With regards to the economy, Kim announced the country's first Five-Year Plan since the 1980s. Speeches by other delegates expressed support for Kim's report.

A decision on approving Kim's report was unanimously adopted on 9 May. In it, the party vowed to continue building a more extensive nuclear arsenal. A report on the work of the Central Auditing Commission was then heard.

On the 9th, foreign journalists were briefly let in the Congress venue for the first time, during the announcement of Kim Jong Un's election as Chairman of the Workers' Party of Korea. The Congress ended on the 9th, and the day also saw a huge parade in Pyongyang in its honor.

=== Elections ===
On 9 May, Kim Jong Un was re-elected to the leadership of the party. His title in this capacity was changed from First Secretary to Chairman of the Workers' Party of Korea, a title reminiscent of that held by his grandfather before 1966: Chairman of the Central Committee of the Workers' Party of Korea.

15 members were elected to the 7th Central Auditing Commission: Choe Sung-ho, Pak Myong-sun, Kim Kyong-nam, Hwang Chol-sik, Kim Yong-chol, Ri Yong-ik, Kim Myong-hun, Kye Yong-sam, Jo Jong-ho, Kye Myong-chol, Jang Jong-ju, Pho Hui-song, Jong Pong-sok, Choe Kwon-su and Ho Kwang-uk. The Commission soon convened and chose as its Chairman Choe Sung-ho and Vice-chairwoman Pak Myong-sun.

129 members and 106 alternate members were elected to the 7th Central Committee, including Kim Jong Un. It held its first plenum immediately after the Congress, on 10 May, and elected officials.
