= 2nd Central Auditing Committee of the Workers' Party of Korea =

The 2nd Central Auditing Committee (CAC) of the Workers' Party of Korea (WPK), officially the Central Auditing Committee of the 2nd Congress of the Workers' Party of Korea, was elected by the 2nd Congress on 30 March 1948.

== Members ==
Rank	Name	Hangul	3rd CAC	Office
1	Ri Chu-yon	리주연	Reelected	Chairman of the WPK Central Auditing Commission.
2	Kim So-ho	김서호	Demoted	Vice Chairman of the WPK Central Auditing Commission.
3	Hyon Chol-chong	현철종	Demoted	Vice Chairman of the WPK Central Auditing Commission.
4	Cha Sun-chol	차순철	Demoted	—
5	Yu Mun-hwa	류문화	Reelected	—
6	Han Hung-guk	한흥국	Demoted	—
7	Yang Yong-sun	양영순	Demoted	—
