= Rules of the Workers' Party of Korea =

Constitution of North Korea's ruling party

- Title page of the current Rulebook of the Workers' Party of Korea

Korean name
- Chosŏn'gŭl: 조선로동당규약
- Hancha: 朝鮮勞動黨規約
- Revised Romanization: Joseon rodongdang gyuyak
- McCune–Reischauer: Chosŏn rodongdang kyuyak

The Rules of the Workers' Party of Korea (Korean: 조선로동당규약; MR: Chosŏn rodongdang kyuyak) are the by-laws of the Workers' Party of Korea (WPK). It sets the rules of the organization and membership of the party. According to the rules, the WPK Congress is the highest body of the party and it, along with the WPK Conference, can amend the rules. The rules defines the character, task, and methodology of the party. According to it, the Party strives to impose communism on the whole of the Korean Peninsula. Following Kim Jong Un's assumption of power, revisions of the Rules defined "Kimilsungism–Kimjongilism" as the ideology of the party.

The first rules were adopted on 30 August 1946 at the 1st Congress of the Workers' Party of North Korea, the immediate predecessor of the modern WPK. Since then, every Conference and some Congresses have revised the rules, most recently the 9th Congress in 2026.

Since the death of Kim Il Sung and Kim Jong Il's accession to the leadership of the country, the rules has not been adhered to by the party. After the 6th Congress in 1980, Congresses were no longer held every five years as stipulated by the rules. Neither were plenums of the Central Committee held at regular six month intervals. Kim Jong Il was also elected General Secretary of the party without observing the correct procedure. In preparation of Kim Jong Un's succession, the 3rd Conference in 2010 revised the rules to ensure that he would secure leadership in both the party and the army at the same time. Changes were also made to allow the Kim dynasty to pick a dates for Congresses freely. Such a Congress, 8th party Congress, amended the rules by giving Kim Jong Un the title General Secretary of the Workers' Party of Korea in January 2021.

== Purpose ==
The rules, commonly known as the "Rules and Constitution", contains the party's by-laws. The rules outlines the character, task and methodology of the Worker's Party. It sets communism across the whole Korean Peninsula as the goal of the party. According to the rules, the party "represents the interests of the Korean nation and people", and its immediate task is "to attain a perfect victory of socialism in the northern part and to complete the revolutionary tasks of achieving national liberation and the people's democracy through the country." This task is to be achieved by "perform[ing] the revolution and construction tasks under the sole leader's exclusive guidance, applying his revolutionary ideology as [the] guideline". The rules stipulates that the party guides all state and social organs in North Korea.

The rules sets the rules on the organization of the party and its membership. It stipulates that the Congress is the highest body of the party. The rules says that when the Congress is not in session, the party is run by the Central Committee. According to the rules, the Central Committee elects the General Secretary of the party, members of the Politburo, its Presidium, the Executive Policy Bureau, members of the Control Commission, and members of the Central Military Commission (CMC).

The rules can be amended by a Congress or a Conference of the party. The Control Commission theoretically probes suspected violations of the rules by party members. However, the rules is, in fact, an essentially meaningless document for much of its existence, since there is no oversight of central-level compliance. Despite this, NK News has called the party rules "one of the most important texts in North Korea's political system".

== Implementation ==
Although the rules is the party's highest document de jure, Kim Il Sung and Kim Jong Il breached party protocol during their rule by not convening party Congresses or Central Committee plenums. The Central Committee is not a permanent body; it must convene, according to the party's rules, at least once every six months. The Central Committee is, according to the party's rules, elected by delegates to a party congress; in practice, however, this has not been the case.

According to Article 27 of the rules, the Central Military Commission (CMC) is the highest party body in military affairs; it commands the Korean People's Army, developing and guiding its weaponry. In practice, however, the CMC is a ceremonial body subordinate to the National Defence Commission. A 1982 amendment to the rules is believed to have made the CMC equal to the Central Committee, enabling it (among other things) to elect the party leader.

Although the party rules specifies that the Politburo should meet at least once a month, there is little evidence that this has actually happened.

In 2010 the rule that Congresses be held every five years was dropped, recognising this had been ignored for thirty years.

== History ==
The first rules was adopted on 30 August 1946 in the 1st Congress of the Workers' Party of North Korea, the immediate predecessor of the present WPK. The 2nd Congress revised it on 30 March 1948, and the 3rd Congress of the Workers' Party of Korea made extensive revisions to it in April 1956. The 4th Congress amended it on 18 September 1961, and the 5th Congress on 13 November 1970. The 6th Congress revised it on 10 October 1980.

The 1990s (especially after Kim Il Sung's death) began a period in which any pretense of following the rules was dropped. No Central Committee plenums were convened between 1993 and 2010, even though the rules mandated one to be held at least every six months. As consequence, the composition of the CC at that time remained only an estimate. It was not known which members of the 6th CC were active or even alive.

In a clear breach of the rules, Kim Jong Il was appointed WPK General Secretary in a joint announcement by the 6th Central Committee and the CMC rather than elected by a plenum of the Central Committee.

=== 3rd party Conference ===
On 26 June 2010 the Politburo announced that it was summoning delegates for the 3rd party Conference, with its official explanation the need to "reflect the demands of the revolutionary development of the Party, which is facing critical changes in bringing about the strong and prosperous state and chuche [Juche] development." The Conference met on 28 September, revising the party rules and electing (and dismissing) members of the Central Committee, the Secretariat, the Politburo, the Presidium and other bodies. The WPK's ultimate goal was changed from "build[ing] a communist society" (although Marxism–Leninism was still mentioned) to "embody[ing] the revolutionary cause of Juche in the entire society".

The rules was revised at the 3rd Conference (its first revision since the 6th Congress in 1980) to require the party's First Secretary to also hold the office of Chairman of the party's Central Military Commission. This was to ensure Kim Jong Un's succession of his father, Kim Jong Il, by guaranteeing that he inherits the top posts in not just the party but the army as well.

Although a congress was formerly mandated to be convened every five years, the 3rd Conference revised the party rules to state that the Central Committee could convene a congress as desired with six months' notice to the party. This, too, was done in preparation for Kim Jong Un's succession, allowing the Kim dynasty to pick the date freely.

Two new articles were added: "The Party and the People's Power" and "The Party Logo and Flag of Party".

=== 4th party Conference ===
Ideology was elaborated at the 4th party Conference in 2012, when Kimilsungism–Kimjongilism became "the only guiding idea of the party" in the rules.

=== 7th party Congress ===
At the 7th party Congress on 9 May 2016, the rules was amended "as required by the developing reality." The dual-track policy of pursuing both economic growth and nuclear weapons capacity was added to the Charter. Secretary titles were made Chairmen and Vice-Chairmen in both the central and municipal levels. The Secretariat was named the Executive Policy Bureau. The First Secretary of the party became Chairman of the Workers' Party.

=== 8th party Congress ===
The 8th party Congress held in 2021 again amended the party rules. It changed the leader of the party from Chairman to General Secretary, established a post called First Secretary, mostly removed mentions of Kim Il Sung, Kim Jong Il and Kim Jong Un, removed a line calling for a revolution in South Korea, and reasserted its commitment to communism.

=== 9th party Congress ===
The 9th party Congress held in 2026 amended the party rules. The amendments included the incorporation of the five-point Party-building line in the new era.

All references to Kimilsungism–Kimjongilism have been removed. Furthermore, all provisions mentioning South Korea—including the demand for the withdrawal of U.S. forces from the Korean Peninsula—have been deleted.

== See also ==
- Constitution of North Korea
- Law of North Korea
- Politics of North Korea
- Ten Principles for the Establishment of a Monolithic Ideological System
