= April 25 House of Culture =

Theatre in Pyongyang, North Korea

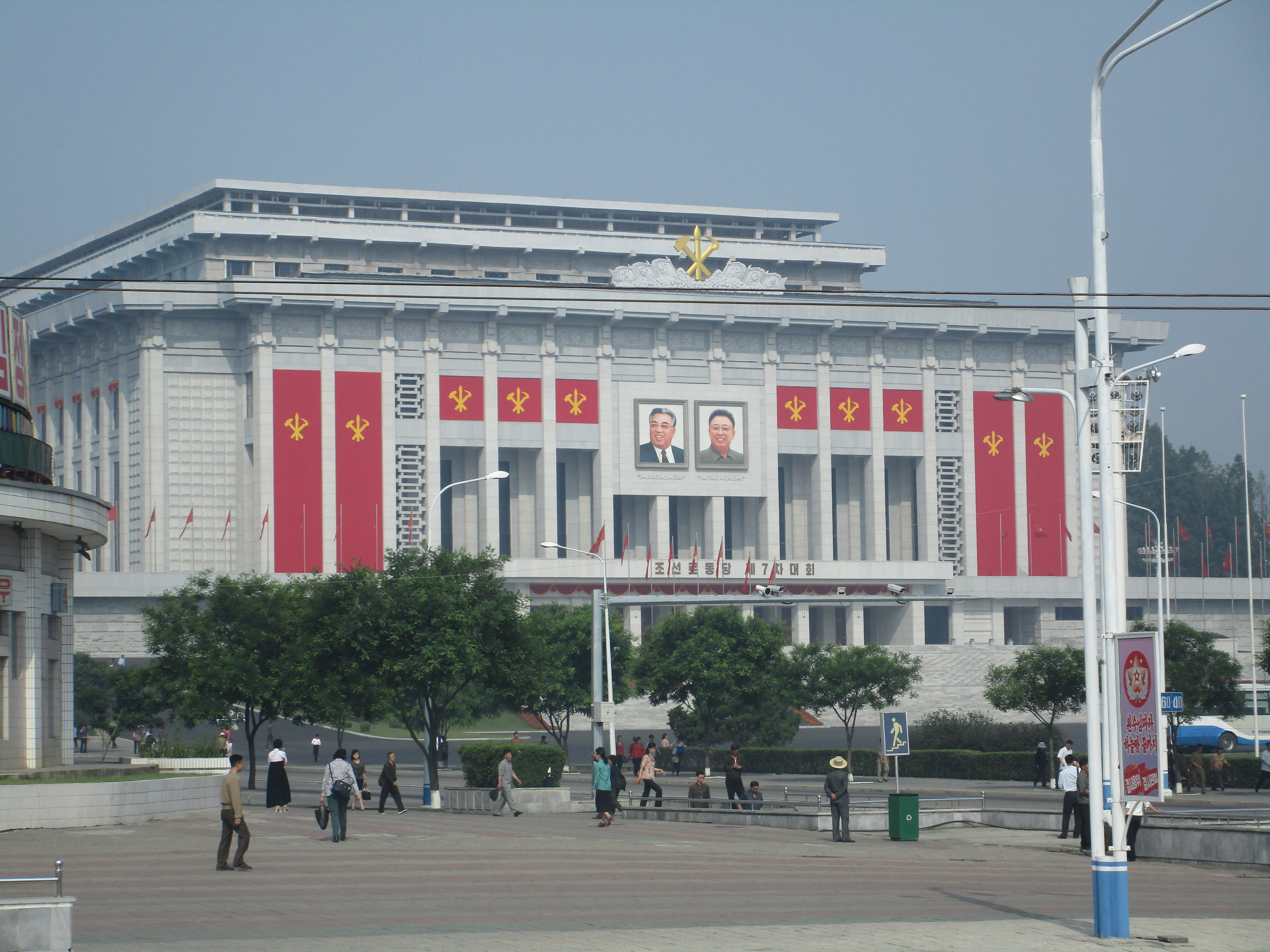
- April 25 House of Culture decorated for the 7th Congress of the Workers' Party of Korea

- Location within Pyongyang
- Former names: February 8 House of Culture; Congress Hall
- Location: Pipha Street, Moranbong District, Pyongyang, North Korea
- Coordinates: 39°3′29″N 125°44′57″E
- Type: Culture venue
- Public transit: Chŏllima: Jŏnu and Hyŏksin: Chŏnsŭng

Construction
- Groundbreaking: April 1974
- Opened: 7 October 1975

Korean name
- Hangul: 4.25 문화회관
- Hanja: 4.25 文化会館
- RR: 4.25 munhwahoegwan
- MR: 4.25 munhwahoegwan

The April 25 House of Culture is a theatre located in Pyongyang, North Korea. It was built in 1974–1975 to provide a venue for military education, and was originally called the February 8 House of Culture. It is located on Pipha Street in the Moranbong District of Pyongyang. The classically colonnaded building is considered one of the best examples of 1970s socialist monumentality in North Korea, the other being the visually similar Mansudae Art Theatre.

It has been the location of many historic events, from the 6th, 7th, 8th and 9th congresses of the Korean Workers' Party, to the historic meeting of Kim Jong Il with the president of South Korea, Roh Moo-hyun, in 2007.

== Construction ==
A 12.4 hectares (31 acres) site was cleared and actual construction on the theatre building was begun in April 1974. The building is 105 metres (344 ft) wide across the front, 176 metres (577 ft) deep, and rises to a height of almost 50 metres (164 ft). It contains two large theatres with 6,000 seats and 1,100 seats respectively with a cinema theatre of 600 seats. Its over 80,000 square metres (861,113 sq ft) of floor space provide for some 600 other rooms in support of the theatres. The building opened on 7 October 1975.

== Name ==
The building as proposed was originally named the February 8 House of Culture after the date of the 1948 official founding of the Korean People's Army (KPA). It was opened under this name and the 6th Congress of the Workers' Party of Korea was held there on 10 to 14 October 1980, under this name. After the congress the building was sometimes referred to as Congress Hall; however, subsequently the name was changed to the April 25 House of Culture, the founding date of the resistance army against the Japanese, in order to reflect the historical connection, and the continuity, with the KPA. North Korea's Military Foundation Day had been changed earlier, in 1978, from 9 February to 25 April, until in 2015 when it returned to the 8 February date.

== Usage ==
The April 25 House of Culture is home to the April 25th Culture and Art Composition Office, which is in charge of organizing major KPA cultural events, including international conferences and state funerals. In addition to meetings for military education, awards and solidarity, and official state ceremonies and party meetings such as the 6th and 7th Congresses of the Workers' Party of Korea, the theatres in the 25 April House of Culture are used for cultural events such as performances by the Korean People's Army Ensemble, or the band Moranbong.

The building rarely sees visits by tourists.

== In culture ==
The North Korean postal service issued a stamp on 7 October 1976, primarily for domestic use, depicting the then new building.

The building appeared in the 2019 South Korean film Ashfall.

== See also ==
- List of theatres in North Korea
