= General Secretary of the Workers' Party of Korea =

Head of the Workers' Party of Korea

- 조선로동당 총비서
- Seal of the General Secretary of the Workers' Party of Korea

- Flag of the Workers' Party of Korea

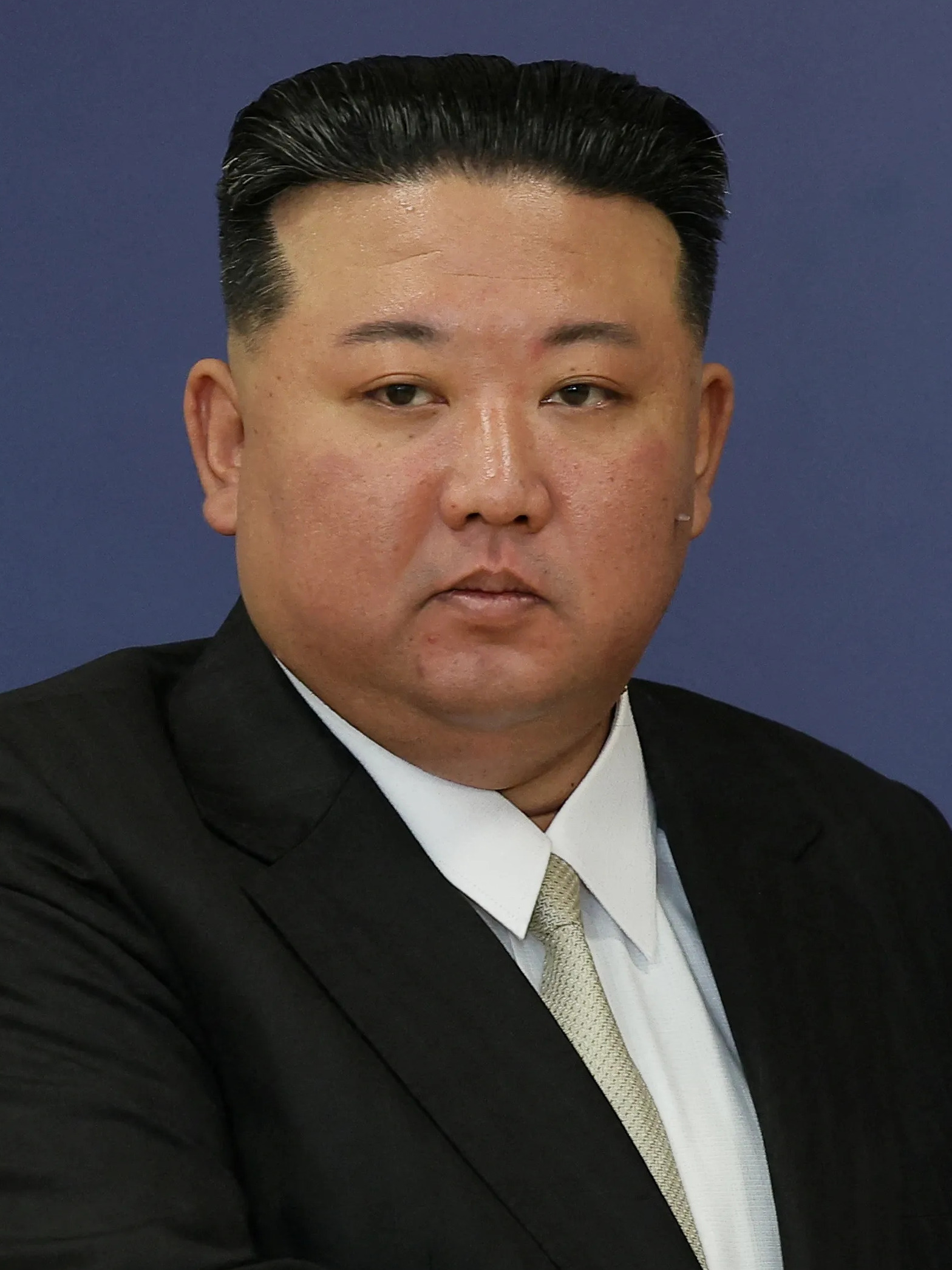
- Incumbent; Kim Jong Un since 11 April 2012 (Note: Kim Jong Un was leader of the WPK under the title of "First Secretary" from 11 April 2012 until 9 May 2016 and "Chairman" from 9 May 2016 until 10 January 2021.)
- Workers' Party of Korea
- Style: Comrade (동지) (formal)
- Type: Party leader; Supreme leader
- Residence: Government Complex No. 1, Pyongyang
- Seat: Pyongyang
- Nominator: Party Congress
- Appointer: Party Congress
- Term length: Five years, Life tenure
- Constituting instrument: Rules of the Workers' Party of Korea
- Inaugural holder: Kim Tu-bong
- Formation: 24 June 1949; 77 years ago
- Deputy: First Secretary

Korean name
- Hangul: 조선로동당 총비서
- Hanja: 朝鮮勞動黨總秘書
- RR: Joseon rodongdang chongbiseo
- MR: Chosŏn rodongdang ch'ongbisŏ

The general secretary of the Workers' Party of Korea (Korean: 조선로동당 총비서) is the leader of the Workers' Party of Korea (WPK), the ruling party in North Korea, and the country's supreme leader. Party rules stipulate that the party congress elects the general secretary. The party conference and the Central Committee are empowered to remove and elect the party leader. The general secretary is ex officio chairman of the WPK Central Military Commission and leads the work of the secretariat. Additionally, the general secretary is by right of office a member of the WPK Presidium, the WPK Politburo and the WPK Secretariat.

The office traces its lineage back to the reestablishment of the Communist Party of Korea (CPK) on 14 September 1945 when Pak Hon-yong was elected Chairman of the CPK Central Committee. Later on 13 October 1945 the CPK established an internal North Korean Branch Bureau (NKBB) and nominated Hyon Chun-hyok as branch secretary. Hyon Chun-hyok was assassinated on 3 September 1945 and Kim Yong-bom was elected as branch secretary in his place. On 10 April 1946 the NKBB became independent of the CPK and changed its name to Communist Party of North Korea (CPNK). Later that year, on 30 August, the CPNK merged with the New People's Party of Korea to establish the Workers' Party of North Korea (WPNK). Kim Tu-bong was elected WPNK Chairman by the 1st WPNK Central Committee. In the meantime the Workers' Party of South Korea (WPSK) was established through the merger of the Communist Party of South Korea (led by Pak Hon-yong), New People's Party of Korea and a faction of the People's Party of Korea on 24 November 1946. The WPSK Central Committee elected Ho Hon as its party chairman. On the merger of the WPNK and the WPSK on 24 June 1949, the 2nd Central Committee elected Kim Il Sung as Chairman of the WPK Central Committee.

The offices of Chairman and Vice Chairman of the WPK Central Committee were abolished on 12 October 1966 and replaced with the offices of General Secretary and Secretary of the WPK Central Committee by a decision of the 14th Plenary Session of the 4th Central Committee. Kim Il Sung was elected and remained in office until his death on 8 July 1994. The post was abolished and replaced by the office of General Secretary of the Workers' Party of Korea on 8 October 1997 after having been left vacant for 3 years and 92 days. Kim Jong Il was elected to the office by a joint announcement of the 6th Central Committee and the 6th Central Military Commission. Kim Jong Il remained in office until his death on 17 December 2011. The office of General Secretary of the Workers' Party of Korea was left vacant for 116 days and was later abolished. Instead, Kim Jong Un was elected First Secretary of the Workers' Party of Korea on 11 April 2012, and his father, Kim Jong Il, was given the appellation "Eternal General Secretary of the Workers' Party of Korea". On 9 May 2016, the 7th WPK Congress abolished the office of First Secretary and the Secretariat and replaced it with Chairman of the Workers' Party of Korea and the office of Vice Chairman of the WPK Central Committee. A similar change took place at the 8th WPK Congress, where the offices of chairman and vice chairman were abolished and replaced by the office of General Secretary of the Workers' Party of Korea and the Secretariat.

== Title history ==
| Title | Established | Abolished | Established by |
|---|---|---|---|
| Chairman of the Central Committee of the Communist Party of Korea 조선공산당 중앙위원회 위원장 | 14 September 1945 | 10 April 1946 | 1945 Congress of the Communist Party of Korea |
| First Secretary of the North Korean Branch Bureau of the Communist Party of Korea 조선공산당 북조선분국 비서 | 13 October 1945 | 10 April 1946 | Conference of Members and Enthusiasts in the Five Northwestern Provinces |
| First Secretary of the Central Committee of the Communist Party of North Korea 북조선공산당 중앙위원회 위원장 | 10 April 1946 | 30 August 1946 | 5th Enlarged Plenary Session of the North Korean Branch Bureau's Executive Committee |
| Chairman of the Central Committee of the Communist Party of South Korea 남조선공산당 중앙위원회 위원장 | 10 April 1946 | 24 November 1946 | April Plenary Session of the Central Committee of the Communist Party of Korea |
| Chairman of the Central Committee of the Workers' Party of North Korea 북조선로동당 중앙위원회 위원장 | 30 August 1946 | 24 June 1949 | 1st Congress of the Workers' Party of North Korea |
| Chairman of the Central Committee of the Workers' Party of South Korea 남조선로동당 중앙위원회 위원장 | 24 November 1946 | 24 June 1949 | 1st Congress of the Workers' Party of South Korea |
| Chairman of the Central Committee of the Workers' Party of Korea 조선로동당 중앙위원회 위원장 | 24 June 1949 | 12 October 1966 | 1st Joint Plenary Session of the 2nd Central Committee of the Workers' Party of Korea |
| General Secretary of the Central Committee of the Workers' Party of Korea 조선로동당 중앙위원회 총비서 | 12 October 1966 | 8 October 1997 | 14th Plenary Session of the 4th Central Committee of the Workers' Party of Korea |
| General Secretary of the Workers' Party of Korea 조선로동당 총비서 | 8 October 1997 | 11 April 2012 | Joint Communique of the 6th Central Committee and the 6th Central Military Commission |
| First Secretary of the Workers' Party of Korea 조선로동당 제1비서 | 11 April 2012 | 9 May 2016 | 4th Conference of the Workers' Party of Korea |
| Chairman of the Workers' Party of Korea 조선로동당 위원장 | 9 May 2016 | 10 January 2021 | 7th Congress of the Workers' Party of Korea |
| General Secretary of the Workers' Party of Korea 조선로동당 총비서 | 10 January 2021 | Incumbent | 8th Congress of the Workers' Party of Korea |

== List of officeholders ==
=== Communist Party of Korea (1945–1946) ===
| No. (Note: Numbers are not official.) | Portrait | Name (Birth–Death) | Term start | Term end | Tenure | Central Committee |
|---|---|---|---|---|---|---|
| 1 | | Pak Hon-yong 박헌영 (1900–1955) | 14 September 1945 | 10 April 1946 | 208 days | CPK Central Committee (1945–1946) |

=== Communist Party of North Korea (1945–1946) ===
| No. | Portrait | Name (Birth–Death) | Term start | Term end | Tenure | Central Committee |
|---|---|---|---|---|---|---|
| 1 | | Kim Yong-bom 김용범 (1902–1947) | 13 October 1945 | 18 December 1945 | 66 days | NKBB Executive Committee (1945–1946) |
| 2 | | Kim Il Sung 김일성 (1912–1994) | 18 December 1945 | 30 August 1946 | 255 days | CPNK Executive Committee (1945–1946) |

=== Workers' Party of North Korea (1946–1949) ===
| No. | Portrait | Name (Birth–Death) | Term start | Term end | Tenure | Central Committee |
|---|---|---|---|---|---|---|
| 1 | | Kim Tu-bong 김두봉 (1889–1958) | 31 August 1946 | 24 June 1949 | 2 years, 297 days | 1st (1946–1948) 2nd (1948–1956) |

=== Communist Party of South Korea (1946) ===
| No. | Portrait | Name (Birth–Death) | Term start | Term end | Tenure | Central Committee |
|---|---|---|---|---|---|---|
| 1 | | Pak Hon-yong 박헌영 (1900–1955) | 10 April 1946 | 24 November 1946 | 228 days | CPK Central Committee (1945–1946) |

=== Workers' Party of South Korea (1946–1949) ===
| No. | Portrait | Name (Birth–Death) | Term start | Term end | Tenure | Central Committee |
|---|---|---|---|---|---|---|
| 1 | | Ho Hon 허헌 (1885–1951) | 24 November 1946 | 24 June 1949 | 2 years, 212 days | Central Committee (1946–1949) |

=== Workers' Party of Korea (since 1949) ===
| No. | Portrait | Name (Birth–Death) | Term start | Term end | Tenure | Central Committee |
|---|---|---|---|---|---|---|
| 1 | | Kim Il Sung 김일성 (1912–1994) | 24 June 1949 | 8 July 1994 | 45 years, 14 days | 2nd (1948–1956) 3rd (1956–1961) 4th (1961–1970) 5th (1970–1980) 6th (1980–2016) |
| 2 | | Kim Jong Il 김정일 (1941–2011) | 8 October 1997 | 17 December 2011 | 14 years, 70 days | 6th (1980–2016) |
| 3 | | Kim Jong Un 김정은 (born 1984) | 11 April 2012 | Incumbent | 14 years, 185 days | 6th (1980–2016) 7th (2016–2021) 8th (2021–2026) 9th (since 2026) |

=== By term ===
| Congress | Term | Start | End | Duration | Leader |
|---|---|---|---|---|---|
| 1st Congress | 1st Central Committee | 30 August 1946 | 30 March 1948 | 1 year and 213 days | Kim Tu-bong |
| 2nd Congress | 2nd Central Committee | 30 March 1948 | 29 April 1956 | 8 years and 30 days | Kim Tu-bong |
| 2nd Congress | 2nd Central Committee | 30 March 1948 | 29 April 1956 | 8 years and 30 days | Kim Il Sung |
| 3rd Congress | 3rd Central Committee | 29 April 1956 | 18 September 1961 | 5 years and 142 days | Kim Il Sung |
| 4th Congress | 4th Central Committee | 18 September 1961 | 13 November 1970 | 9 years and 56 days | Kim Il Sung |
| 5th Congress | 5th Central Committee | 13 November 1970 | 14 October 1980 | 9 years and 336 days | Kim Il Sung |
| 6th Congress | 6th Central Committee | 14 October 1980 | 9 May 2016 | 35 years and 208 days | Kim Il Sung |
| 6th Congress | 6th Central Committee | 14 October 1980 | 9 May 2016 | 35 years and 208 days | Kim Jong Il |
| 6th Congress | 6th Central Committee | 14 October 1980 | 9 May 2016 | 35 years and 208 days | Kim Jong Un |
| 7th Congress | 7th Central Committee | 9 May 2016 | 10 January 2021 | 4 years and 246 days | Kim Jong Un |
| 8th Congress | 8th Central Committee | 10 January 2021 | 22 February 2026 | 5 years and 43 days | Kim Jong Un |
| 9th Congress | 9th Central Committee | 22 February 2026 | Incumbent | 233 days | Kim Jong Un |

== See also ==
- Politburo of the Workers' Party of Korea
- Presidium of the Politburo of the Workers' Party of Korea
- Secretariat of the Workers' Party of Korea
