= Pak Myong-sun =

North Korean politician

Alternate member of the Politburo of the Workers' Party of Korea
- Incumbent
- Assumed office 13 August 2020
- General Secretary: Kim Jong Un

Personal details
- Political party: Workers' Party of Korea

Pak Myong-sun (Korean: 박명순) is a North Korean politician. She is the director of the Workers' Party of Korea (WPK) department (possibly the Light Industry Department) and a member of the WPK Politburo. She is the only female head of a party department and one of only two female Politburo members.

== Biography ==
She made her public appearance along with Kim Jong Un at the September 2010 Party Representative Conference when she was elected to the First Deputy Chair of the WPK Central Auditing Commission. In December 2011 she was a member of the commission which organized the state funeral of Kim Jong Il. In October 2013 she was appointed to WPK Central Committee vice director. On August 13, 2020, at the 16th Politburo meeting of the 7th Central Committee of the WPK she was appointed to an alternate (candidate) member of the Politburo of the Workers' Party of Korea and a director of an unspecified WPK department (possibly the Light Industry Department). Pak is one of only two women on the Politburo, the other being Kim Yo Jong, and the only female head of a party department.
