= Central Committee of the Workers' Party of Korea =

Highest body of the Workers' Party of Korea between its national meetings

Coordinates: 39°0′57″N 125°44′26″E

Central Committee of the Workers' Party of Korea 조선로동당 중앙위원회
- 9th Central Committee of the Workers' Party of Korea
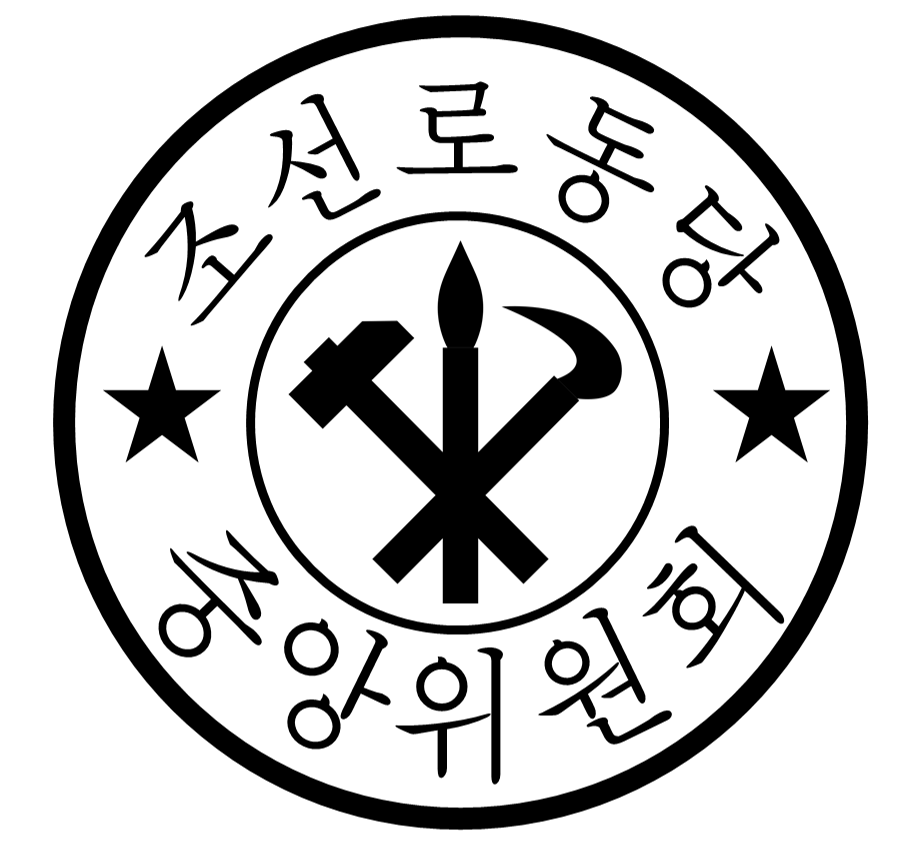
- Seal used by the Central Committee of the Workers' Party of Korea (c.1982)

Overview
- Type: Highest decision-making organ when Congress is not in session.
- Elected by: Congress
- Length of term: Five years
- Term limits: None

History
- Established: by 1st Congress on 30 August 1946; 80 years ago
- First convocation: 31 August 1946

Leadership
- General Secretary: Kim Jong Un, General Secretary of the Party
- Executive organ: Politburo
- Military organ: Central Military Commission

Members
- Total: 139

Alternates
- Total: 111

Elections
- Last election: 8th Congress (2021)

Meeting place
- Government Complex No. 1, Pyongyang, North Korea

Constitution
- Rules of the Workers' Party of Korea

- Central Committee of the Workers' Party of Korea
- Hangul: 조선로동당 중앙위원회
- Hanja: 朝鮮勞動黨 中央委員會
- RR: Joseon rodongdang jungangwiwonhoe
- MR: Chosŏn rodongdang chungangwiwŏnhoe

The Central Committee of the Workers' Party of Korea is the highest organ between national meetings of the Workers' Party of Korea (WPK), the ruling party of North Korea. According to WPK rules, the Central Committee is elected by the party congress and the party conference can be conferred the right to renew its membership composition. In practice, the Central Committee has the ability to dismiss and appoint new members without consulting with the wider party at its own plenary sessions.

The 1st Central Committee was elected at the 1st WPK Congress in 1946. It was composed of 43 members. The numbers of Central Committee members have increased since then, with the 8th Congress in 2021 electing 250 members. Non-voting members, officially referred to as alternate members at the present, were introduced at the 2nd Congress.

The Central Committee convenes at least once a year for a plenary session ("meeting"), and shall function as a top forum for discussion about relevant policy issues. It operates on the principle of the Monolithic Ideological System and the Great Leader theory. The role of the Central Committee has varied throughout history. In its early history until the August Faction Incident it was a forum in which different factions competed. Since then, it has generally exercised power through formal procedures defined in the party rules. However, its actual ability to affect outcomes of national-level personnel decisions is non-existent, as that function has generally been, in practice, carried out by the Kim family and the Politburo. Nonetheless, Central Committee plenums function as venues whereby policy is formally implemented, and public announcements made. Decisions are released publicly in the form of "resolutions" or "decisions".

== History ==
The Central Committee was established at the 1st Congress when its 1st composition was elected. It was composed of 43-members and has since expanded at all congresses. From 1948 to 1961 an average of 2.4 meetings per year were held, about the same rate as the Central Committee of the Communist Party of the Soviet Union. Meetings held during this period frequently did not exceed one day. The Central Committee's power lay not in how often (or for how long) it met but in its apparatus. Controlled by the Politburo rather than the Central Committee, the apparatus was the nominal government of North Korea under Kim Il Sung. The Central Committee was not convened for a plenary session between 1993 and 2010.

It was a 37-year interval between the 6th Congress and the 7th Congress. The Central Committee and its apparatus were weakened greatly under Kim Jong Il, with several offices remaining unfilled. Beginning in 2005 he took several steps to revitalize the party, appointing senior officials to new posts. Pak Nam Gi was appointed head of the Planning and Finance Department, and Jang Song-thaek was appointed head of the Administrative Department. Overseeing all security matters, Jang was indirectly restored to his duties and responsibilities as head of the Organization and Guidance Department. The 3rd Conference of Representatives (held in September 2010) renewed the composition of the Central Committee; however, the power to give it a new term is held by the party congress.

== Regulations ==
=== Election and appointment process ===
The Charter prescribes that the size of the central committee is determined by the congress presidium. The Central Committee Plenary Session is empowered to renew its rank if "necessary". Candidates can be nominated by the provincial committees, but the Central Committee through the Organization and Guidance Department has the final say.

=== Plenary sessions ===
In between sessions of party congresses and conferences, the Central Committee is the highest WPK institution. It is not a permanent body and, according to the WPK Charter, shall convene at least once a year. The Politburo summons the Central Committee for plenary sessions. A plenary session shall consist of, according to the WPK Charter, discussing and deciding on "important issues of the party" and is empowered to elect the Politburo and its Presidium, Executive Policy Bureau, the Central Military Commission, the Control Commission, WPK vice-chairmen, heads of CC departments and lower-level provincial posts. It was formerly empowered to elect the party's leader. It can elevate alternate, non-voting members to full members and appoint new voting and non-voting members to the Central Committee at its plenary sessions.

== Main decision-making organs ==
=== Politburo ===
The Politburo, formerly the Political Committee, was the main decision-making body of the WPK until the establishment of the Presidium. The Politburo has full (voting) and candidate (non-voting) members and is the highest WPK decision-making body when it convenes for meetings. Until the 3rd Conference, the Politburo was elected by the Central Committee immediately after a congress. Although the party charter specifies that the Politburo should meet at least once a month, there is little evidence that this actually happens. Politburo members may serve concurrently on party or state commissions, the government or the Central Committee apparatus.

Evidence suggests that the Politburo functions much like the CPSU Politburo under Stalin, with Politburo members acting as the party leader's personal staff rather than as policymakers. This was not always the case; before Kim Il Sung purged the party opposition, the Politburo was a decision-making body where policy differences were discussed. Since Kim Il Sung's consolidation of power, the Politburo has turned into a rubber stamp body. Leading members have disappeared without explanation; the last case is that of Kim Tong-gyu who disappeared in 1977. Politburo members under Kim Il Sung and Kim Jong Il lacked a strong power base and depended on the party leader for their position.

==== Presidium ====
The Presidium was established at the 6th Congress in 1980 and is the highest decision-making organ within the WPK when the Politburo and the Central Committee are not in session. With the death of O Jin-u in 1995, Kim Jong Il remained the only member of the Presidium still alive; the four others (Kim Il Sung, Kim Il, O Jin-u, and Ri Jong-ok) died in office. Between O Jin-u's death and the 3rd Conference, there were no reports indicating that Kim Jong Il or the central party leadership was planning to change the composition of the Presidium. Stephan Haggard, Luke Herman and Jaesung Ryu, writing for Asian Survey in 2014, contended that the Presidium "was clearly not a functioning institution."

=== Secretariat ===
The Secretariat, in its current form, was established at the 8th Congress, however, its history can be traced back to the establishment of the Secretariat at the 2nd Party Conference in October 1966. It mimics the role of its Soviet counterpart during the Stalin era. The WPK General Secretary is exofficio the Head of the Secretariat, and the other members have the title of "Secretary of the WPK Central Committee". The body is responsible for overseeing and implementing party policies and supervising party organs.

=== Central Military Commission ===
The Central Military Commission was established in 1962 by a decision of the 5th Plenary Session of the 4th Central Committee. A 1982 amendment to the WPK charter is believed to have made the CMC equal to the Central Committee, enabling it (among other things) to elect the WPK leader. Despite this, some observers believe that at the 3rd Conference the CMC again became accountable to the Central Committee. According to Article 27 of the WPK Charter, the CMC is the highest party body in military affairs and leads the Korean People's Army (KPA). It is responsible for the army's weapons and armaments development and procurement policies. The WPK General Secretary is by right the CMC Chairman.

=== Control Commission ===
The Control Commission, formerly the Inspection Commission, was elected by the 1st CC Plenary Session after a party congress. It is responsible for regulating party membership and resolves disciplinary issues involving party members. Investigative subjects range from graft to anti-party and counter-revolutionary activities, generally encompassing all party rules violations. Lower-level party organizations (at the provincial or county level, for example) and individual members may appeal directly to the commission. It was abolished on 10 January 2021 and its functions moved to the Central Auditing Commission.

== Administrative responsibilities ==
=== Departments ===
Although under Kim Jong Il's rule the Central Committee apparatus underwent several reorganizations, some departments (mainly those responsible for internal and organizational party affairs: the Organization and Guidance, Propaganda and Agitation and Cadre Affairs departments) were left largely untouched. In contrast, departments responsible for overseeing the economy or South Korean affairs (such as the Administrative Department, which was re-established in 2006 after being part of the Organization and Guidance Department since the 1990s) were frequently revamped. Although the United Front Department had its ups and downs during Kim Jong Il's rule, in 2006–2007 it was the centre of a purge.

The Economic Planning and Agricultural Policy departments were abolished in 2002–2003 to strengthen cabinet control of the economy. Further changes occurred in 2009 with the establishment of the Film and Light Industry Industrial Policy departments; Office 38 was merged into Office 39 (and later re-established), the External Liaison Department was moved from WPK jurisdiction to the Cabinet, while Office 35 (also known as the External Investigations and Intelligence Department) and the Operations Department were moved from WPK jurisdiction to the Reconnaissance General Bureau.

In 2010, North Korea renamed the Munitions Industry Department to "Machine Building Industry Department" as part of efforts to evade sanctions targeting of its defense industry; it reverted to its former name in 2017.

By the 3rd Conference, it was known by foreign observers that certain department heads (Chong Pyong-ho, Kim Kuk-tae and Ri Ha-il, for example) had retired.

A new Legal Affairs Department was created in August 2020 and the 8th Congress in January 2021 revealed the existence of an economic policy office. During the 8th Congress a Discipline Inspection Department was created.

Departments and offices
Department or office	Director	Ref
Organization and Guidance Department	Kim Jae Ryong	
Publicity and Information Department	Ri Il-hwan	
Cadres Department	Ho Chol-man	
Light Industry Department (Note: North Korea uses the English translation 'Information and Publicity Department')	Pak Myong Sun	
Economic Affairs Department	O Su Yong	
Science and Education Department	Choe Song Thaek	
International Department	Kim Song-nam	
Military–Political Leadership Department	O Il Jong	
Munitions Industry Department (Note: Also known as the Machine Industry Department or the Defense Industry Department)	Yu Jin	
Working Organization Department	Ri Il-hwan	
Agriculture Department	Ri Chol-man	
Party History Institute	—N/a	
Documents and Archives Department	—N/a	
Civil Defense Department	Choe Chun-gil	
Appeals Office	—N/a	
Finance Accounting Department	—N/a	
General Affairs Department	—N/a	
United Front Department	Kim Yong Chol	
Discipline Inspection Department	Pak Thae Dok	
Legal Affairs Department	Kim Hyong Sik	
Office 39	Sin Ryong Man	
Economic Policy Office	Jon Hyon Chol	

=== Rodong Sinmun ===
The Rodong Sinmun is an organ of the WPK Central Committee and acts as the official mouthpiece of the party. Its task is to "achieve a revolutionary transformation of society and the people as demanded by revolutionary ideology and juche idea of the great suryŏng, hold the entire party and people firmly around Kim Jong Il, and fight to secure political and ideological unity of the party." The editor-in-chief of the newspaper is appointed by the central committee in a plenary session.

== See also ==
- Central Committee of the Communist Party of the Soviet Union
- Central Committee of the Chinese Communist Party
