= 4th Conference of the Workers' Party of Korea =

2012 event in North Korean politics

- The flag of the Workers' Party of Korea
- Date: 11 April 2012
- Location: Kumsusan Memorial Palace, Pyongyang
- Participants: --
- Outcome: Election of the Party First Secretary, Central Committee, Central Military Commission and Central Auditing Commission

- 4th Conference of the Workers' Party of Korea
- Hangul: 조선로동당 제4차 대표자회
- Hanja: 朝鮮勞動黨 第4次 代表者會
- RR: Joseon rodongdang je4cha daepyojahoe
- MR: Chosŏn rodongdang che4ch'a taep'yojahoe

The 4th Conference of the Workers' Party of Korea was held in Pyongyang on 11 April 2012. The meeting elected the highest authority of the Workers' Party of Korea (WPK), and revised the party charter. It was the fist WPK Conference since Kim Jong Un assumed power in 2011.

== Overview ==
The four topics of the meeting were:

- Forever wholeheartedly supporting Kim Jong Il as General Secretary of the Workers' Party of Korea, and forever carrying forward Kim Jong Il's revolutionary career and immortal revolutionary achievements.
- Revising the Rules of the Workers' Party of Korea.
- Following Kim Jong Il's instructions, supporting Kim Jong Un as the supreme leader of the Workers' Party of Korea.
- Issues related to the Party organization.

The new Rules of the Workers' Party of Korea adopted at the meeting established the position of First Secretary of the Workers' Party of Korea, stipulating that the First Secretary is the head of the party, representing the party and leading the entire party. At the same time, the new party constitution pointed out that Kim Jong Il is "the eternal General Secretary of the Workers' Party of Korea, the eternal leader of the Workers' Party of Korea and the Korean people" and "the Workers' Party of Korea is the party of the great Comrade Kim Il Sung and Comrade Kim Jong il".

The meeting decided to elect Kim Jong Un as First Secretary of the Workers' Party of Korea. Kim Jong Un was also elected as a member of the Politburo of the Workers' Party of Korea, a member of the Standing Committee, and Chairman of the Central Military Commission.

The meeting also elected, elected, and appointed members of the Central Leadership of the Workers' Party of Korea:

- Choe Ryong-hae was elected as a member of the Standing Committee of the Politburo; Kim Jong-gak, Jang Song-thaek, Pak To-chun, Hyon Chol-hae, Kim Won-hong, and Ri Myong -su were elected as members of the Politburo; and Kwak Pham-ki, O Kuk-ryol, Ro Tu-chol, Ri Pyong-sam, and Jo Yon-jun were elected as alternate members of the Politburo.
- Kim Kyong-hui and Kwak Beom-ki were elected as secretaries of the Central Secretariat.
- Choi Ryong-hae was elected as Vice Chairman of the Central Military Commission; Hyun Cheol-hae, Lee Myung-soo, and Kim Rak-kyum were elected as members of the Central Military Commission.
- To elect additional members and alternate members of the Central Committee.
- Kim Yong-chun, Kwak Beom-ki, and Pak Pong-ju were appointed as ministers of the Central Committee.
- By-election of members of the Central Inspection Commission.
