= Central Auditing Commission of the Workers' Party of Korea =

The Central Auditing Commission (CAC) of the Workers' Party of Korea (WPK) (조선로동당중앙검사위원회) is the highest control body in the party between sessions of the party congress. The organ has been in existence since the 2nd Party Congress in 1948.

The CAC was until the 8th WPK Congress elected by the delegates of the party congress but a rule change in 2021 transferred the election rights to the WPK Central Committee. The 8th WPK Congress abolished the WPK Inspection Commission on 10 January 2021 and transferred its duties to the CAC.

== Chairmen ==
- Ri Chu-yon (리주연) (1948–56)
- Choe Won-taek (최원택) (1956–61)
- Kim Ryo-jung (김려중) (1961–66)
- Ri Pong-su (리봉수) (Briefly in 1966)
- Kim Se-hwal (김세활) (1966–80)
- Ri Rak-bin (리락빈) (1980–1997)
- Kim Chang-su (김창수) (28 September 2010 – April 2014)
- Ri Sung Ho (April 2014 – August 2014)
- Choe Sung-ho (최승호) (presumably after October 2014 − 10 January 2021)
- Jong Sang-hak (정상학) (10 January 2021 – June 2022)
- Kim Jae-ryong (김재룡) (from June 2022 onwards)

== See also ==
- Central Auditing Commission of the Chinese Communist Party
- Central Auditing Commission of the Socialist Unity Party of Germany
- Central Auditing Commission of the Communist Party of the Soviet Union
