= Kim Han-sol =

North Korean student, ruling family member

- 김한솔
- Born: 16 June 1995 (age 31); Pyongyang, North Korea
- Education: Paris Institute of Political Studies
- Parents: Kim Jong-nam (father); Ri Hye-kyong (mother)
- Relatives: Kim family

Korean name
- Hangul: 김한솔
- RR: Gim Hansol
- MR: Kim Hansol

Kim Han-sol (Korean: 김한솔, born 16 June 1995) is the eldest son of Kim Jong-nam and a grandson of the former North Korean ruler Kim Jong Il. His father was the unofficial heir apparent until he fell out of favor with the regime after a failed attempt to secretly visit Tokyo Disneyland in May 2001.

Kim Han-sol's half-uncle, Kim Jong Un, was named the heir apparent in September 2010, and succeeded Kim Jong Il upon the latter's death in December 2011. Since his father's assassination in 2017, he has been under the protective custody of the United States Central Intelligence Agency and is reportedly living in the United States.

== Early life and education ==
Kim Han-sol was born in Pyongyang on June 16, 1995, and had an isolated upbringing in Mainland China and Macau. Kim Han-sol first came to public attention in 2011 when he was accepted by Li Po Chun United World College, a member of the UWC movement, to study in Hong Kong. Later, he was denied a student visa by the Hong Kong government. In late 2011, due to an admissions announcement by the United World Colleges' (UWC) United World College in Mostar, Bosnia and Herzegovina campus, it was discovered by the South Korean media that one of the newly admitted students to the college was Kim Han-sol, about whom very little had been previously known.

The South Korean media tracked down several online accounts maintained by Kim Han-sol. The content of the accounts were widely spread online, providing stark contrast to his grandfather's regime. In various posted messages on YouTube, Facebook, and Twitter, he expressed guilt for his family's role in the suffering of the North Korean people. He expressed guilt about having enough to eat when his people in North Korea were starving, and he appeared to criticize his uncle – the heir apparent – Kim Jong Un.

In October 2012, Kim Han-sol made his first ever televised interview (in English) with Finnish TV network Yle, making several comments about his desire for Korean reunification, and not disputing the interviewer Elisabeth Rehn's disparaging characterizations of Kim Han-sol's grandfather's and uncle's rule over North Korea.

In December 2013, Kim was in his first year of study at the Le Havre campus of France's Sciences Po university. Following the execution of his grand uncle Jang Song-thaek in the same month, he was placed under police protection. He completed his studies at Sciences Po in 2016.

== Assassination of Kim Jong-nam ==
Kim Han-sol's father Kim Jong-nam was assassinated in Malaysia on 13 February 2017, by two women who attacked him at the Terminal 2 of the Kuala Lumpur International Airport with VX nerve agent, a lethal chemical weapon. On 7 March 2017, in a partially censored video published by the group Free Joseon, Kim Han-sol stated that he was with his mother and sister and hoping that it would "get better soon." The uncensored video was later uploaded in 2019, which included Han-Sol thanking Adrian Hong and his team for his help.

His father's body was flown back to North Korea on 31 March, despite his protests.

In October 2017, Chinese police arrested two North Korean agents in Beijing, on suspicion of plotting to harm Kim Han-sol, according to the South Korean newspaper JoongAng Ilbo. The two suspects were members of North Korea's Reconnaissance General Bureau, which is responsible for overseas espionage, and were part of a team of seven foiled by Chinese authorities. In April 2020, Bloomberg News reported that Kim Han-sol's "whereabouts remain unknown" since the assassination. In November 2020, it was reported that Han-sol had been taken into protective custody by the Central Intelligence Agency at some point following his father's assassination. In January 2023, Chun In-bum, a former lieutenant general in the South Korean Army, told The Daily Telegraph that Han-sol "seems to be somewhere in Europe being protected and taken care of". As of January 2024, he is reportedly living in the United States as a result of assistance from Free Joseon.

== Family tree ==
Select (Note: To keep the tree of manageable size, it omits five out of the seven known legitimate children of Kim Il Sung. Other children not shown in the tree are: Kim Man-il (1944–1947; child of Kim Jong-suk), Kim Kyong-jin (born 1952; child of Kim Song-ae), Kim Yong-il (1955–2000; child of Kim Song-ae), and Kim Kyong-suk (born 1951; child of Kim Song-ae). A stillborn daughter is also omitted. Kim Il Sung was reported to have had other children with women who he was not married to; they included Kim Hyŏn-nam (born 1972). Also, only some of the descendants of Kim Jong Il and Kim Jong Un (Kim Il Sung's successors) are included.) family tree of North Korea's ruling Kim family (Note: Korean names often have a variety of transliterations into English, which can be confusing. For example, "Kim Jong Chul" may also be written "Gim Jeong-cheol" or "Kim Jŏng-ch'ŏl" among many other variations. See Korean romanization for more information.) (Note: Huss, Kan; Frost, Clay. "North Korea's First Family: Mapping the personal and political drama of the Kim clan". msnbc.com. Archived from the original on 4 February 2012. (Confirms many, but not all, of the birth and death years. See individual articles for more references.))

Kim Song-ryeong; 1810–1899
Kim Ŭngu; 1848–1878
Kim Pohyŏn; 1871–1955
Kim Hyong-jik; 1894–1926 | Kang Pan Sok; 1892–1932
Kim Jong-suk; 1917–1949 | Kim Il Sung; 1912–1994 | Kim Song-ae; 1924–2014 | Kim Yong-ju; 1920–2021
Kim Young-sook; 1947– | Song Hye-rim; 1937–2002 | Kim Jong Il; 1941? (Note: Official North Korean biographies of Kim Jong Il list his birth year as 1942. The Korean calendar is based upon the Chinese zodiac which is believed to characterize one's personality. The year 1942 (Year of the Horse), in addition to being 30 years since Kim Il Sung's birth may be viewed as a better year than others, thus creating a motive to lie about a birth year.)–2011 | Ko Yong-hui; 1952–2004 | Kim Ok; 1964– | Kim Kyong-hui; 1946– | Jang Song-thaek; 1946–2013 | Kim Pyong Il; 1954–
Kim Sol-song; 1974– | Kim Jong-nam; 1971–2017 | Kim Jong Chul; 1981– | Kim Jong Un; 1983? (Note: Official North Korean biographies of Kim Jong Un list his birth year as 1982. The Korean calendar is based upon the Chinese zodiac which is believed to characterize one's personality. The year 1982 (Year of the Dog), in addition to being 70 years since Kim Il Sung's birth, may be viewed as a better year than others, thus creating a motive to lie about a birth year.)– | Ri Sol-ju c. 1986– | Kim Yo Jong; 1987–
Kim Han-sol; 1995– | Kim Ju Ae c. 2012 (Note: Birth year for Kim Ju Ae is not publicly known. She may have been born in either late 2012 or early 2013.)–

== See also ==
- Kim family (North Korea)
- Politics of North Korea
