= Kim Jong Chul =

Son of Kim Jong Il (born 1981)

- Born: 25 September 1981 (age 45); Pyongyang, North Korea
- Education: Kim Il Sung University
- Political party: Workers' Party of Korea
- Parent(s): Kim Jong Il (father); Ko Yong Hui (mother)
- Relatives: Kim family

Korean name
- Hangul: 김정철
- Hanja: 金正哲
- RR: Gim Jeongcheol
- MR: Kim Chŏngch'ŏl

Kim Jong Chul (Korean: 김정철; born 25 September 1981), sometimes spelled Kim Jong Chol, is the son of the former North Korean Supreme Leader Kim Jong Il. His younger brother is current Supreme Leader Kim Jong Un. His older half-brother is Kim Jong-nam, who was assassinated in February 2017.

In 2007, Jong Chul was appointed deputy chief of a leadership division of the Workers' Party of Korea. However, on 15 January 2009, the South Korean Yonhap News Agency reported that Kim Jong Il appointed his youngest son, Jong Un, to be his successor, passing over Jong Nam and Jong Chul. These reports were supported in April 2009 when Kim Jong Un assumed a low-level position within the ruling Workers' Party since Kim Jong Il was groomed by his own father, Kim Il Sung, in a similar way before becoming North Korean leader in 1994.

== Early life ==
Kim Jong Chul was born in 1981. He is the son of Kim Jong Il and companion Ko Yong Hui, who died in 2004. He was educated at the International School of Berne with younger brother Kim Jong Un.

== Heir apparent ==
In February 2003, moves began to raise the profile of Kim Jong Chul. The Korean People's Army began a propaganda campaign using the slogan "The Respected Mother is the Most Faithful and Loyal Subject to the Dear Leader Comrade Supreme Commander". Since the "Respected Mother" was described as "‍[devoting] herself to the personal safety of the comrade supreme commander", and "‍[assisting] the comrade supreme commander nearest to his body", Western analysts assume that the "Respected Mother" was Ko Yong Hui, mother of Kim Jong Chul and Kim Jong Un. A similar campaign was launched in praise of Kim Jong Il's mother (Kim Jong Suk) during the later years of Kim Il Sung's life. This suggested that Kim Jong Chul, despite his youth, had emerged with Army backing to be a serious contender to succeed his father.

However, Kenji Fujimoto, Kim Jong Il's personal sushi chef, wrote in his memoir, I Was Kim Jong-il's Cook, that Kim Jong Il thought Jong Chul was "no good because he is like a little girl". Fujimoto believed Kim Jong Il favoured his youngest son, Kim Jong Un.

On 1 June 2009, it was reported that Kim Jong Chul had been passed over as his younger brother, Kim Jong Un, was to succeed his father as the head of the Workers' Party of Korea and de facto head of state of North Korea.

== 2011–present ==
Kim Jong Chul was reportedly spotted in Singapore on 14 February 2011, where he was attending an Eric Clapton concert. In late 2011, his father died and his younger brother, Kim Jong Un, succeeded his father as the head of state. Kim Jong Chul was again apparently spotted attending two additional Clapton concerts on successive days at the Royal Albert Hall in London, in May 2015.

According to Lee Yun-keol (as reported by Wen Wei Po), chairman of the North Korea Strategy Information Service Center, Kim Jong Chul personally led the arrest of his uncle Jang Song-thaek in 2013. Some analysts believe that this signalled an expanded role for Kim Jong Chul in the North Korean regime.

Kim Jong Chul does not involve himself in politics, leading a quiet life in Pyongyang where he plays guitar in a band, according to Thae Yong-ho, North Korea's former deputy ambassador in London who defected to the South.

Select (Note: To keep the tree of manageable size, it omits five out of the seven known legitimate children of Kim Il Sung. Other children not shown in the tree are: Kim Man-il (1944–1947; child of Kim Jong-suk), Kim Kyong-jin (born 1952; child of Kim Song-ae), Kim Yong-il (1955–2000; child of Kim Song-ae), and Kim Kyong-suk (born 1951; child of Kim Song-ae). A stillborn daughter is also omitted. Kim Il Sung was reported to have had other children with women who he was not married to; they included Kim Hyŏn-nam (born 1972). Also, only some of the descendants of Kim Jong Il and Kim Jong Un (Kim Il Sung's successors) are included.) family tree of North Korea's ruling Kim family (Note: Korean names often have a variety of transliterations into English, which can be confusing. For example, "Kim Jong Chul" may also be written "Gim Jeong-cheol" or "Kim Jŏng-ch'ŏl" among many other variations. See Korean romanization for more information.) (Note: Huss, Kan; Frost, Clay. "North Korea's First Family: Mapping the personal and political drama of the Kim clan". msnbc.com. Archived from the original on 4 February 2012. (Confirms many, but not all, of the birth and death years. See individual articles for more references.))

Kim Song-ryeong; 1810–1899
Kim Ŭngu; 1848–1878
Kim Pohyŏn; 1871–1955
Kim Hyong-jik; 1894–1926	Kang Pan Sok; 1892–1932
Kim Jong-suk; 1917–1949	Kim Il Sung; 1912–1994	Kim Song-ae; 1924–2014	Kim Yong-ju; 1920–2021
Kim Young-sook; 1947–	Song Hye-rim; 1937–2002	Kim Jong Il; 1941? (Note: Official North Korean biographies of Kim Jong Il list his birth year as 1942. The Korean calendar is based upon the Chinese zodiac which is believed to characterize one's personality. The year 1942 (Year of the Horse), in addition to being 30 years since Kim Il Sung's birth may be viewed as a better year than others, thus creating a motive to lie about a birth year.)–2011	Ko Yong-hui; 1952–2004	Kim Ok; 1964–	Kim Kyong-hui; 1946–	Jang Song-thaek; 1946–2013	Kim Pyong Il; 1954–
Kim Sol-song; 1974–	Kim Jong-nam; 1971–2017	Kim Jong Chul; 1981–	Kim Jong Un; 1983? (Note: Official North Korean biographies of Kim Jong Un list his birth year as 1982. The Korean calendar is based upon the Chinese zodiac which is believed to characterize one's personality. The year 1982 (Year of the Dog), in addition to being 70 years since Kim Il Sung's birth, may be viewed as a better year than others, thus creating a motive to lie about a birth year.)–	Ri Sol-ju c. 1986–	Kim Yo Jong; 1987–
Kim Han-sol; 1995–	Kim Ju Ae c. 2012 (Note: Birth year for Kim Ju Ae is not publicly known. She may have been born in either late 2012 or early 2013.)–
