= Kim Sol-song =

Daughter of Kim Jong Il (born 1974)

- 김설송
- Born: 30 December 1974 (age 51); North Korea
- Education: Kim Il Sung University
- Occupation: Lieutenant colonel in the Korean People's Army
- Political party: Workers' Party of Korea
- Parent(s): Kim Jong Il; Kim Young-sook
- Relatives: Kim family

Korean name
- Hangul: 김설송
- Hanja: 金雪松
- RR: Gim Seolsong
- MR: Kim Sŏlsong

Kim Sol-song (Korean: 김설송; born 30 December 1974) is the daughter of North Korea's former leader Kim Jong Il and Kim Young-sook and a half-sister to Kim Jong Un, the current leader of North Korea. She has been active within the propaganda department, been in charge of literary affairs, and previously led the security and schedule of her father as his secretary.

== Biography ==
The name "Sol-song" literally means "snow pine", and was given by her grandfather, Kim Il Sung.

Sol-song was a favourite of her father. Like him, she attended Kim Il Sung University, majoring in economics. She may also have studied in Paris in the autumn of 2005. After graduating, she was assigned to the propaganda department of the Central Committee of the Workers' Party of Korea. She was in charge of literary affairs: all the signatures on works of literature coming into the department were hers.

Starting in the late 1990s, Sol-song was in charge of managing the security and schedule of Kim Jong Il. She accompanied her father during trips to North Korean Army units and local villages. During these trips, she was observed wearing the uniform of a lieutenant colonel.

According to NK News, she may be the unknown assistant of her younger half-brother Kim Jong Un who appeared in 2022. According to a research fellow at the Sejong Institute, she may be the chief vice-chair of the Central Committee of the Workers' Party of Korea: that same research fellow further alleged that she was the first vice-chair of the State Affairs Commission of North Korea. A different fellow at the Sejong Institute alleges that she may have orchestrated the Assassination of Kim Jong-nam, and it was rumored that she was responsible for the 2013 execution of Jang Song-thaek. According to The Chosun Ilbo, she also serves in the same capacity for Jong Un as she did for Jong Il, managing his schedule and security. It has also been rumored, however, that she is detained.

Sol-song was described by a North Korean defector as "intelligent" and "beautiful". She has hair down to her waist and is 1.65 meters (5 ft 5 in) tall. She is reportedly modest.

== Geneology ==
Select (Note: To keep the tree of manageable size, it omits five out of the seven known legitimate children of Kim Il Sung. Other children not shown in the tree are: Kim Man-il (1944–1947; child of Kim Jong-suk), Kim Kyong-jin (born 1952; child of Kim Song-ae), Kim Yong-il (1955–2000; child of Kim Song-ae), and Kim Kyong-suk (born 1951; child of Kim Song-ae). A stillborn daughter is also omitted. Kim Il Sung was reported to have had other children with women who he was not married to; they included Kim Hyŏn-nam (born 1972). Also, only some of the descendants of Kim Jong Il and Kim Jong Un (Kim Il Sung's successors) are included.) family tree of North Korea's ruling Kim family (Note: Korean names often have a variety of transliterations into English, which can be confusing. For example, "Kim Jong Chul" may also be written "Gim Jeong-cheol" or "Kim Jŏng-ch'ŏl" among many other variations. See Korean romanization for more information.) (Note: Huss, Kan; Frost, Clay. "North Korea's First Family: Mapping the personal and political drama of the Kim clan". msnbc.com. Archived from the original on 4 February 2012. (Confirms many, but not all, of the birth and death years. See individual articles for more references.))

Kim Song-ryeong; 1810–1899
Kim Ŭngu; 1848–1878
Kim Pohyŏn; 1871–1955
Kim Hyong-jik; 1894–1926	Kang Pan Sok; 1892–1932
Kim Jong-suk; 1917–1949	Kim Il Sung; 1912–1994	Kim Song-ae; 1924–2014	Kim Yong-ju; 1920–2021
Kim Young-sook; 1947–	Song Hye-rim; 1937–2002	Kim Jong Il; 1941? (Note: Official North Korean biographies of Kim Jong Il list his birth year as 1942. The Korean calendar is based upon the Chinese zodiac which is believed to characterize one's personality. The year 1942 (Year of the Horse), in addition to being 30 years since Kim Il Sung's birth may be viewed as a better year than others, thus creating a motive to lie about a birth year.)–2011	Ko Yong-hui; 1952–2004	Kim Ok; 1964–	Kim Kyong-hui; 1946–	Jang Song-thaek; 1946–2013	Kim Pyong Il; 1954–
Kim Sol-song; 1974–	Kim Jong-nam; 1971–2017	Kim Jong Chul; 1981–	Kim Jong Un; 1983? (Note: Official North Korean biographies of Kim Jong Un list his birth year as 1982. The Korean calendar is based upon the Chinese zodiac which is believed to characterize one's personality. The year 1982 (Year of the Dog), in addition to being 70 years since Kim Il Sung's birth, may be viewed as a better year than others, thus creating a motive to lie about a birth year.)–	Ri Sol-ju c. 1986–	Kim Yo Jong; 1987–
Kim Han-sol; 1995–	Kim Ju Ae c. 2012 (Note: Birth year for Kim Ju Ae is not publicly known. She may have been born in either late 2012 or early 2013.)–

== See also ==
- Women in North Korea
