= Kim Man-il =

Son of Kim Il Sung (1943–1947)

- Born: Alexander Kim c. 1943; Vyatskoye, Khabarovsk Krai, Soviet Union
- Died: 1947 (aged 3–5); Pyongyang, North Korea (North Korean sources); Vyatskoye, Khabarovsk Krai, Soviet Union (Soviet records)
- Parents: Kim Il Sung; Kim Jong Suk
- Family: Kim family

Korean name
- Hangul: 김만일
- Hanja: 金萬一
- RR: Gim Manil
- MR: Kim Manil

Kim Man-il (Korean: 김만일; born Alexander Kim; (Note: Russian: Александр Ким) 1943–1947) was the second son of the North Korean founding leader Kim Il Sung and his first wife Kim Jong Suk. He was the younger brother of Kim Jong Il, the second leader of North Korea.

== Biography ==
Soviet records show that he was born Alexander Kim in 1943 in the village of Vyatskoye, Khabarovsk Krai, Soviet Union. Inside his family, he went by a Russian diminutive nickname for "Alexander", Shura (Russian: Шура).

Official North Korean biographies state that he and his older brother Kim Jong Il got along very well and played together.

=== Death ===
There are conflicting accounts of Kim Man-il's death. North Korean sources claim that in the summer of 1946 or 1948, he accidentally drowned while playing with his brother in a pond in Pyongyang. However, Russian sources indicate that he fell in a well in Vyatskoye and drowned, prior to the family moving back to Korea. Two North Korean defectors have alleged that the young Kim Jong Il was responsible. When the brothers were playing in the pond near the edge in chest-high water, Kim Jong Il raised his face above the water faster than Shura and pushed his younger brother's head back into the water while laughing, eventually drowning him in the process.

Official North Korean records state that, after Kim Man-il's death, Kim Jong Il was devastated and never got over the trauma. A grave allegedly belonging to Kim Man-il is located in Vyatskoye. A year after his death, in 1949, his mother Kim Jong Suk died while giving birth to a stillborn girl.

The Kim family tree (DPRK)

Na Hyeon-Jik	Kim Song-Ryeong
Lady Lee	Kim Ŭngu
Yi Poik	Kim Pohyŏn
Kang Pan Sok	Kim Hyong-jik	Kim Hyong-gwon
Kim Song-ae	Kim Il Sung	Kim Jong-suk	Kim Yong-ju
Kim Pyong-il	Kim Jong Il	Kim Kyong-hui	Kim Man-il

Select (Note: To keep the tree of manageable size, it omits five out of the seven known legitimate children of Kim Il Sung. Other children not shown in the tree are: Kim Man-il (1944–1947; child of Kim Jong-suk), Kim Kyong-jin (born 1952; child of Kim Song-ae), Kim Yong-il (1955–2000; child of Kim Song-ae), and Kim Kyong-suk (born 1951; child of Kim Song-ae). A stillborn daughter is also omitted. Kim Il Sung was reported to have had other children with women who he was not married to; they included Kim Hyŏn-nam (born 1972). Also, only some of the descendants of Kim Jong Il and Kim Jong Un (Kim Il Sung's successors) are included.) family tree of North Korea's ruling Kim family (Note: Korean names often have a variety of transliterations into English, which can be confusing. For example, "Kim Jong Chul" may also be written "Gim Jeong-cheol" or "Kim Jŏng-ch'ŏl" among many other variations. See Korean romanization for more information.) (Note: Huss, Kan; Frost, Clay. "North Korea's First Family: Mapping the personal and political drama of the Kim clan". msnbc.com. Archived from the original on 2012-02-04. (Confirms many, but not all, of the birth and death years. See individual articles for more references.))

Kim Song-ryeong; 1810–1899
Kim Ŭngu; 1848–1878
Kim Pohyŏn; 1871–1955
Kim Hyong-jik; 1894–1926	Kang Pan Sok; 1892–1932
Kim Jong-suk; 1917–1949	Kim Il Sung; 1912–1994	Kim Song-ae; 1924–2014	Kim Yong-ju; 1920–2021
Kim Young-sook; 1947–	Song Hye-rim; 1937–2002	Kim Jong Il; 1941? (Note: Official North Korean biographies of Kim Jong Il list his birth year as 1942. The Korean calendar is based upon the Chinese zodiac which is believed to characterize one's personality. The year 1942 (Year of the Horse), in addition to being 30 years since Kim Il Sung's birth may be viewed as a better year than others, thus creating a motive to lie about a birth year.)–2011	Ko Yong-hui; 1952–2004	Kim Ok; 1964–	Kim Kyong-hui; 1946–	Jang Song-thaek; 1946–2013	Kim Pyong Il; 1954–
Kim Sol-song; 1974–	Kim Jong-nam; 1971–2017	Kim Jong Chul; 1981–	Kim Jong Un; 1983? (Note: Official North Korean biographies of Kim Jong Un list his birth year as 1982. The Korean calendar is based upon the Chinese zodiac which is believed to characterize one's personality. The year 1982 (Year of the Dog), in addition to being 70 years since Kim Il Sung's birth, may be viewed as a better year than others, thus creating a motive to lie about a birth year.)–	Ri Sol-ju c. 1986–	Kim Yo Jong; 1987–
Kim Han-sol; 1995–	Kim Ju Ae c. 2012 (Note: Birth year for Kim Ju Ae is not publicly known. She may have been born in either late 2012 or early 2013.)–
