= Ri Sol-ju =

First Lady of North Korea since 2018

Respected First Lady Ri Sol-ju
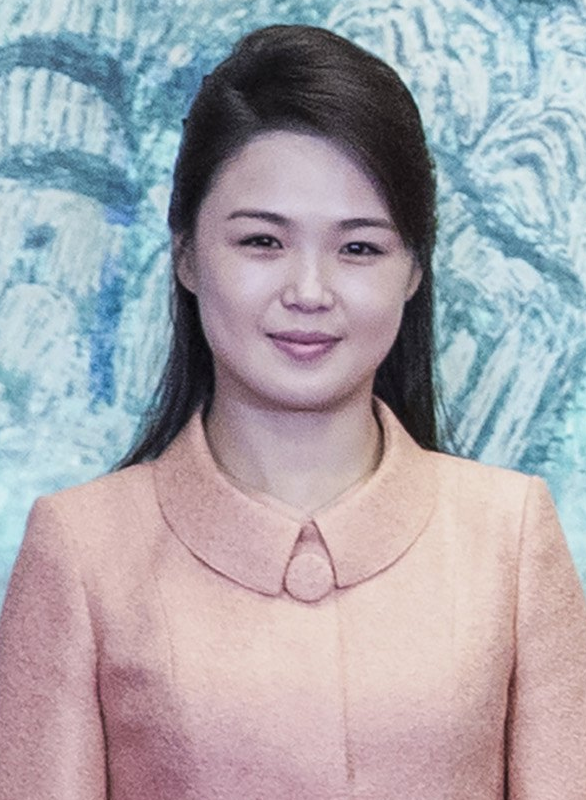
- Ri in 2018

First Lady of North Korea
- Incumbent
- Assumed role 15 April 2018
- Supreme Leader: Kim Jong Un
- Preceded by: Kim Song-ae

Personal details
- Born: c. 1985–1989 (age 36–41) Chongjin, North Hamgyong Province, North Korea
- Spouse: Kim Jong-un (m. 2009)
- Children: 3 (Note: One daughter confirmed, which is Kim Ju Ae, while the other two are unconfirmed.)
- Relatives: Kim family (by marriage)
- Education: Kim Il Sung University

Korean name
- Hangul: 리설주
- Hanja: 李雪主
- RR: Ri Seolju
- MR: Ri Sŏlchu

Ri Sol-ju (Note: Also transliterated as Ri Sol Ju.) (Korean: 리설주; born c. 1985–1989) is the current first lady of North Korea as the wife of Supreme Leader Kim Jong Un.

Little is known about her from official North Korean sources, but outside sources have speculated more about her background. While she has made many public appearances with her husband, she has also spent long periods out of the public eye. In April 2018, state media announced that her new title had been elevated from merely "Comrade" (동무) to "Respected First Lady" (존경하는 녀사) – considered a significant honor and the first time the title has been used since 1974. At the same time, she began to take on a diplomatic role.

== Biography ==
North Korean leader Kim Jong Un and his family have been characterized as "secretive". Very little information about Ri Sol-ju has appeared in official North Korean sources, but more speculative information has been reported in foreign media.

=== Early life ===
Very little is known for certain about Ri's origins; some analysts have even said that her name "almost certainly is a pseudonym". Her reported year of birth has ranged between 1985 and 1989. According to The Wall Street Journal, she was born in Chongjin, the capital of North Hamgyong Province. Ri's family is reportedly from the political elite; her mother is the head of a gynecology ward and her father is a professor. She is said to have graduated from Geumsung 2 Middle School in Pyongyang and studied abroad in China, majoring in vocal music. She is said to be related to Ri Pyong-chol, a former general of the Korean People's Army Air and Anti-Air Force and close advisor of Kim Jong Un. JoongAng Ilbo and some commentators have identified Ri as a singer in the Unhasu Orchestra that has made several overseas performances. Reportedly, North Korean officials are "trying to erase her past as a singer and entertainer by confiscating popular bootleg CDs of her performances", such as her singing the song "Sobaeksu". In 2012, she was reportedly a graduate student at Kim Il Sung University, pursuing a PhD in science.

Ri reportedly visited South Korea in 2005 as a member of the North Korean cheerleading team during the Asian Athletics Championships. She was said to be among 90 cheerleaders who chanted "We are one!" Ri reportedly told a South Korean teacher while on the trip: "We want to take classes from the South's teachers after being reunited as soon as possible."

=== Marriage and children ===
The BBC, quoting an analyst who spoke to The Korea Times of South Korea, reported that Kim's father, Kim Jong Il, had hastily arranged his son's marriage after suffering a stroke in 2008. The two were reportedly married in 2009. Her identity as Kim Jong Un's wife first became known to the public in July 2012.

Ri was reported to have given birth to a child in 2010; sources reported it was a boy.

In December 2012, it was reported that Ri was visibly pregnant, although North Korean officials did not comment. In March 2013, former NBA basketball player Dennis Rodman visited Kim Jong Un in North Korea. Rodman told The Guardian in September 2013 that the couple's child, a girl, is named Kim Ju Ae (Korean: 김주애). He said that Jong-un had "a beautiful family" and was a "good dad".

South Korean intelligence officials reported that Ri gave birth to a third child of unknown gender in February 2017.

In November 2022, North Korean state media published photographs of Kim Jong Un holding hands with his young daughter at the site of a missile launch in Pyongyang. While the child was not named, observers believe it is Kim Ju Ae.

=== First Lady of North Korea ===
In 2012, Ri made several public appearances standing next to Kim Jong Un, causing speculation about who she might be. South Korean intelligence officials wrongly identified her as Hyon Song-wol, a former singer for the Pochonbo Electronic Ensemble, a musical group popular in North Korea. However, on 25 July 2012, North Korean state media announced that she was actually Kim's wife, saying she was "his wife, Comrade Ri Sol-ju". The announcement of the marriage marked a change from Kim's father Kim Jong Il, who had never introduced his wives to the public.

In July 2012, at an elite gala concert in North Korea, Ri was stylishly "dressed in a trim black suit in the Chanel tradition", considered unusual for North Korean women. Along with other recent changes, such as the firing of a hard-line top general, Kim Jong Un's marriage is seen by analysts as "a continuation of what is either a policy change, or a propaganda offensive, or both".

In September 2012, Kenji Fujimoto, the former personal sushi chef of Kim Jong Il, said he met Ri on a recent trip to North Korea. He described her as "just so charming ... I cannot describe her voice, it's so soft ..." As a parting gift, Ri gave Fujimoto a Christian Dior handbag, which Ri was earlier reported to have been carrying.

From 2012 to 2014, Ri appeared occasionally in the North Korean media, accompanying her husband to events, but subsequently, she was rarely seen. She had long periods out of the public view in 2015, 2016, and 2017.

In 2018, Ri took on a diplomatic role. In March 2018, she visited China with her husband, meeting China's paramount leader Xi Jinping and his wife, Peng Liyuan. In April 2018, ahead of the April 2018 inter-Korean summit, Ri's title was elevated to "Respected First Lady" (instead of just "Comrade"), the first time since 1974 the title had been used in North Korea; the previous bearer was Kim Il Sung's second wife, Kim Song-ae. The change in title was made public in a news report read by star anchorwoman, Ri Chun-hee, who often makes major announcements. Ri attended the summit, the first wife of a North Korean leader to do so, and met the First Lady of South Korea, Kim Jung-sook, for the first time. The two first ladies were observed as being close to each other during their meetings that year. In May, she met with US diplomats and helped ease tensions. She also helped host the visit of China's paramount leader Xi Jinping and his wife Peng Liyuan in June 2019.

Select (Note: To keep the tree of manageable size, it omits five out of the seven known legitimate children of Kim Il Sung. Other children not shown in the tree are: Kim Man-il (1944–1947; child of Kim Jong-suk), Kim Kyong-jin (born 1952; child of Kim Song-ae), Kim Yong-il (1955–2000; child of Kim Song-ae), and Kim Kyong-suk (born 1951; child of Kim Song-ae). A stillborn daughter is also omitted. Kim Il Sung was reported to have had other children with women who he was not married to; they included Kim Hyŏn-nam (born 1972). Also, only some of the descendants of Kim Jong Il and Kim Jong Un (Kim Il Sung's successors) are included.) family tree of North Korea's ruling Kim family (Note: Korean names often have a variety of transliterations into English, which can be confusing. For example, "Kim Jong Chul" may also be written "Gim Jeong-cheol" or "Kim Jŏng-ch'ŏl" among many other variations. See Korean romanization for more information.) (Note: Huss, Kan; Frost, Clay. "North Korea's First Family: Mapping the personal and political drama of the Kim clan". msnbc.com. Archived from the original on 4 February 2012. (Confirms many, but not all, of the birth and death years. See individual articles for more references.))

Kim Song-ryeong; 1810–1899
Kim Ŭngu; 1848–1878
Kim Pohyŏn; 1871–1955
Kim Hyong-jik; 1894–1926	Kang Pan Sok; 1892–1932
Kim Jong-suk; 1917–1949	Kim Il Sung; 1912–1994	Kim Song-ae; 1924–2014	Kim Yong-ju; 1920–2021
Kim Young-sook; 1947–	Song Hye-rim; 1937–2002	Kim Jong Il; 1941? (Note: Official North Korean biographies of Kim Jong Il list his birth year as 1942. The Korean calendar is based upon the Chinese zodiac which is believed to characterize one's personality. The year 1942 (Year of the Horse), in addition to being 30 years since Kim Il Sung's birth may be viewed as a better year than others, thus creating a motive to lie about a birth year.)–2011	Ko Yong-hui; 1952–2004	Kim Ok; 1964–	Kim Kyong-hui; 1946–	Jang Song-thaek; 1946–2013	Kim Pyong Il; 1954–
Kim Sol-song; 1974–	Kim Jong-nam; 1971–2017	Kim Jong Chul; 1981–	Kim Jong Un; 1983? (Note: Official North Korean biographies of Kim Jong Un list his birth year as 1982. The Korean calendar is based upon the Chinese zodiac which is believed to characterize one's personality. The year 1982 (Year of the Dog), in addition to being 70 years since Kim Il Sung's birth, may be viewed as a better year than others, thus creating a motive to lie about a birth year.)–	Ri Sol-ju c. 1986–	Kim Yo Jong; 1987–
Kim Han-sol; 1995–	Kim Ju Ae c. 2012 (Note: Birth year for Kim Ju Ae is not publicly known. She may have been born in either late 2012 or early 2013.)–

== See also ==
- Unhasu Orchestra

== Notes ==
Honorary titles
Vacant Title last held by Kim Song-ae	First Lady of North Korea; 2018–present	Incumbent
