= Kim Pyong Il =

Half-brother of Kim Jong Il (born 1954)

His Excellency Kim Pyong Il
- 김평일
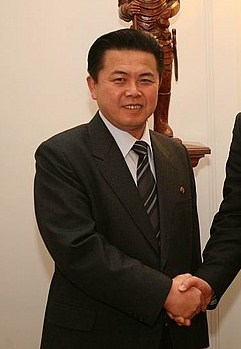
- Kim in 2010

North Korea Ambassador to the Czech Republic
- In office 2015–2019
- Supreme Leader: Kim Jong Un
- Preceded by: Pak Hyon-bo
- Succeeded by: Ju Won-chol

North Korea Ambassador to Poland
- In office 1998–2015
- Supreme Leader: Kim Jong Il; Kim Jong Un
- Preceded by: Paek Nam-sun
- Succeeded by: Geun Ri

North Korea Ambassador to Finland
- In office 1994–1998
- Supreme Leader: Kim Il Sung; Kim Jong Il
- Preceded by: Choe Sang-bom
- Succeeded by: post not filled

North Korea Ambassador to Bulgaria
- In office 1989–1994
- Supreme Leader: Kim Il Sung

North Korea Ambassador to Hungary
- In office 1988–1989
- Supreme Leader: Kim Il Sung

Personal details
- Born: 10 August 1954 (age 72) Pyongyang, North Korea
- Party: Workers' Party of Korea
- Spouse: Kim Sun-kum (m. 1982)
- Children: 2
- Parent(s): Kim Il Sung (father); Kim Song-ae (mother)
- Relatives: Kim family
- Education: Kim Il Sung University
- Occupation: North Korean battalion commander Former North Korean ambassador to Hungary, Bulgaria, Finland, Poland and the Czech Republic

Korean name
- Hangul: 김평일
- Hanja: 金平日
- RR: Gim Pyeongil
- MR: Kim P'yŏngil

Kim Pyong Il (Korean: 김평일; born 10 August 1954) is a retired North Korean diplomat. He is the only surviving son of former leader and dictator of North Korea Kim Il Sung, the younger paternal half-brother of the late leader of North Korea, Kim Jong Il and the uncle of current North Korean leader Kim Jong Un. He lived overseas between 1979 and 2019, serving in various diplomatic positions such as ambassador of North Korea to Hungary, Bulgaria, Finland, Poland, and the Czech Republic.

== Family background and early life ==
Kim is the son of Kim Il Sung and Kim Song-ae, Kim Il Sung's former secretary. Kim had one younger brother, Yong-il, (Note: Not the same person as Kim Yong-il, Premier of the DPRK Cabinet from April 2007 to June 2010.) and one older half-sister, Kyong-hui, who would go on to marry senior official Chang Sung-taek. He was named after another son with the same name, who was born in Vyatskoye in 1944; that son, also known as Shura Kim, allegedly drowned in Pyongyang in 1947. He graduated from Kim Il Sung University with a major in economics, and later attended the Kim Il Sung Military University, following which he was appointed a battalion commander.

Kim Pyong Il's rivalry with half-brother Kim Jong Il goes back to the 1970s. In those days, Kim Pyong Il was known as a womaniser who threw raucous parties; sometimes, attendees at these parties would shout, "Long live Kim Pyong Il!". Kim Jong Il knew that this could be portrayed as a threat to the cult of personality surrounding their father Kim Il Sung, and reported the matter; Kim Il Sung was reportedly infuriated, and thus Kim Pyong Il fell out of favour with his father while Kim Jong Il strengthened his position.

Kim Pyong Il married Kim Sun-kum, a woman with family connections to the Ministry of Public Security, in 1982. They have a son, Kim In-kang, and a daughter, Kim Ung-song.

== Diplomatic career ==
In 1979, Kim began a series of diplomatic postings to several countries in Europe so that he could not influence politics in his home country. His first overseas assignment was in the Socialist Federal Republic of Yugoslavia. He was promoted to the position of ambassador to the People's Republic of Hungary in 1988, but was transferred to the People's Republic of Bulgaria in response to Hungary's opening of diplomatic relations with South Korea in 1989. This was followed by a posting in Finland.

In 1998, after North Korea closed its embassy in Finland to save money and prevent defections, Kim was posted to Poland. His ambassadorship was initially suggested to be in limbo, as nine months after his posting he had yet to formally present his credentials to the Polish president. However, he remained as ambassador in Poland, and his daughter Kim Eun-song and son Kim In-kang went on to attend university in Poland. He was a rare sight in Warsaw's diplomatic community, only occasionally appearing at functions held by the Algerian, Russian and Syrian embassies.

In 2015, he was transferred to the Czech Republic. He later returned to North Korea in November 2019 after stepping down as North Korea's ambassador to the Czech Republic. In January 2020, Ju Won Chol, a former Director General of the North Korean Ministry of Foreign Affairs (MFA) Second European Department, replaced Kim as North Korea's Czech Republic ambassador.

== Relations with Pyongyang ==
Kim Pyong Il reportedly continued to be considered a threat to the North Korean government due to his resemblance to his father Kim Il Sung. Reports claim he is under watch by both North and South Korean intelligence. However, he has kept a low profile, in contrast to his half-nephew Kim Jong-nam who gave frequent interviews with Japanese media, before he was assassinated in Kuala Lumpur in 2017.

In July 2011, Kim was reported by South Korean media to be back in Pyongyang for a visit. Some sources claimed he was under house arrest there since May, though others speculated he was just visiting his dying mother Kim Song-ae or preparing to observe the anniversary of his father's death.

In December 2011, South Korean officials said Kim Pyong Il was in Poland and would not attend Kim Jong Il's funeral. He attended the funeral of Kim Il Sung with his wife in 1994, but North Korean television broadcasts deleted their images.

In July 2015, Kim Pyong Il was reported to briefly return to North Korea. The purpose was to attend an ambassadors conference, where he met Kim Jong Un. Four years later, in June 2019, he visited North Korea again for reported medical reasons. In November 2019, Kim Pyong Il returned to North Korea after retiring from a long career as a foreign diplomat. He had not lived in his native country since 1979. As a result, his return to North Korea following his retirement as a foreign diplomat also marked his return to being a North Korean resident for the first time in 40 years.

== Family tree ==
Select (Note: To keep the tree of manageable size, it omits five out of the seven known legitimate children of Kim Il Sung. Other children not shown in the tree are: Kim Man-il (1944–1947; child of Kim Jong-suk), Kim Kyong-jin (born 1952; child of Kim Song-ae), Kim Yong-il (1955–2000; child of Kim Song-ae), and Kim Kyong-suk (born 1951; child of Kim Song-ae). A stillborn daughter is also omitted. Kim Il Sung was reported to have had other children with women who he was not married to; they included Kim Hyŏn-nam (born 1972). Also, only some of the descendants of Kim Jong Il and Kim Jong Un (Kim Il Sung's successors) are included.) family tree of North Korea's ruling Kim family (Note: Korean names often have a variety of transliterations into English, which can be confusing. For example, "Kim Jong Chul" may also be written "Gim Jeong-cheol" or "Kim Jŏng-ch'ŏl" among many other variations. See Korean romanization for more information.) (Note: Huss, Kan; Frost, Clay. "North Korea's First Family: Mapping the personal and political drama of the Kim clan". msnbc.com. Archived from the original on 4 February 2012. (Confirms many, but not all, of the birth and death years. See individual articles for more references.))

Kim Song-ryeong; 1810–1899
Kim Ŭngu; 1848–1878
Kim Pohyŏn; 1871–1955
Kim Hyong-jik; 1894–1926	Kang Pan Sok; 1892–1932
Kim Jong-suk; 1917–1949	Kim Il Sung; 1912–1994	Kim Song-ae; 1924–2014	Kim Yong-ju; 1920–2021
Kim Young-sook; 1947–	Song Hye-rim; 1937–2002	Kim Jong Il; 1941? (Note: Official North Korean biographies of Kim Jong Il list his birth year as 1942. The Korean calendar is based upon the Chinese zodiac which is believed to characterize one's personality. The year 1942 (Year of the Horse), in addition to being 30 years since Kim Il Sung's birth may be viewed as a better year than others, thus creating a motive to lie about a birth year.)–2011	Ko Yong-hui; 1952–2004	Kim Ok; 1964–	Kim Kyong-hui; 1946–	Jang Song-thaek; 1946–2013	Kim Pyong Il; 1954–
Kim Sol-song; 1974–	Kim Jong-nam; 1971–2017	Kim Jong Chul; 1981–	Kim Jong Un; 1983? (Note: Official North Korean biographies of Kim Jong Un list his birth year as 1982. The Korean calendar is based upon the Chinese zodiac which is believed to characterize one's personality. The year 1982 (Year of the Dog), in addition to being 70 years since Kim Il Sung's birth, may be viewed as a better year than others, thus creating a motive to lie about a birth year.)–	Ri Sol-ju c. 1986–	Kim Yo Jong; 1987–
Kim Han-sol; 1995–	Kim Ju Ae c. 2012 (Note: Birth year for Kim Ju Ae is not publicly known. She may have been born in either late 2012 or early 2013.)–

== See also ==
- Kim family (North Korea)
- Politics of North Korea
