= Kim Pohyŏn =

Grandfather of Kim Il Sung (1871–1955)

- 김보현
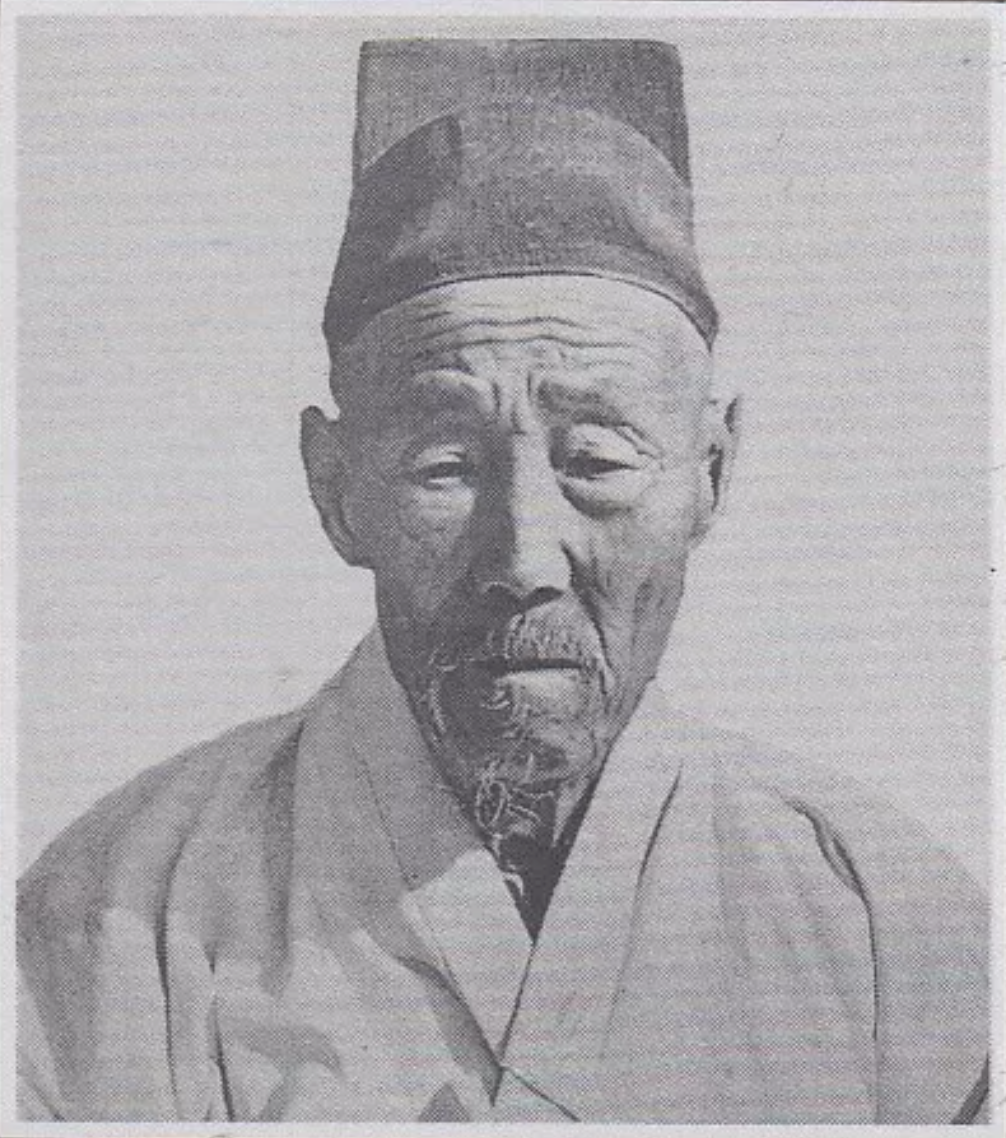
- Kim in 1945
- Born: 3 October 1871; Mangyongdae, Joseon
- Died: 2 September 1955 (aged 83); Pyongyang, North Korea
- Burial place: Revolutionary Martyrs' Cemetery
- Spouse: Yi Poik
- Children: 6, including Kim Hyong-jik and Kim Hyŏnggwŏn
- Parents: Kim Ŭngu (father); Lady Lee (North Korea) (mother)
- Relatives: Kim family

- Kim Pohyŏn
- Hangul: 김보현
- Hanja: 金輔鉉
- RR: Gim Bohyeon
- MR: Kim Pohyŏn

Kim Pohyŏn (Korean: 김보현; Hanja: 金輔鉉; 3 October 1871 – 2 September 1955) was a farmer from South Pyongan Province. He was the paternal grandfather of the founder of North Korea, Kim Il Sung, the great-grandfather of Kim Jong Il, and great-great-grandfather of the current leader of North Korea, Kim Jong Un.

He is buried in the Revolutionary Martyrs' Cemetery in North Korea.

== Biography ==
Kim Pohyŏn was born on 3 October 1871 as the only son to Mangyongdae farmer Kim Ŭngu (17 June 1848 – 4 October 1878). Kim Ŭngu died at the age of thirty, one day after Kim Pohyŏn's seventh birthday. Without his father, Kim went to live with his uncle.

In his twenties, Pohyŏn married a girl named Yi Poik, who was five years younger than him. Together, they had three sons and three daughters, the most well known of the offspring being Kim Hyong-jik. To feed his six offspring, Kim was said to have woken up at early dawn and went around the village to collect manure, while at night, he was said to twist straw ropes, make straw sandals and plait straw mats by lamplight.

Kim Il Sung claimed his ancestors, including his grandfather Kim Pohyŏn and great-grandfather Kim Ŭngu, were involved in the General Sherman incident, despite the fact that Kim Pohyŏn was not born until five years later. The account, undisputed in North Korea, has been questioned by independent scholars abroad. From September 16, 1948, to October 1, 1949, he served as the Deputy Head of the High Special Advisor to the Agricultural Department of the Democratic People's Republic of Korea. After officially retiring from his position on October 1, 1949, he died at the age of 83 in 1955.

== Legacy ==
Kim Pohyŏn and Yi Poik were likened as "patriots" by the Editorial Committee for the Short Biography of Kim Il Sung.

A statue in his honor stands at the Revolutionary Martyrs' Cemetery.

In 1947, the Democratic People's Republic of Korea established an agricultural college named Kim Bo-hyun University in his honor.

On 19 August 2013, wreaths were sent by various North Korean organizations to the tombs of Kim Pohyŏn and Yi Poik.

== Family ==
- Father: Kim Ŭngu (김응우; 17 June 1848 – 4 October 1878)
  - Grandfather: Kim Songnyŏng (김송령; 1 December 1810 – 12 March 1899)
  - Grandmother: Na Hyŏnjik (나현직; 4 March 1811 – 23 January 1897)
- Mother: Lady Yi (이씨)
- Wife: Yi Poik (이보익; 31 May 1876 – 18 October 1958)
1. Son: Kim Hyong-jik (김형직; 10 July 1894 – 5 June 1926)
2. Son: Kim Hyŏngnok (김형록)
3. Son: Kim Hyong-gwon (김형권; 4 November 1905 – 12 January 1936)
4. Daughter: Kim Kuil (김구일)
5. Daughter: Kim Hyŏngsil (김형실)
6. Daughter: Kim Hyŏngpok (김형복)

Select (Note: To keep the tree of manageable size, it omits five out of the seven known legitimate children of Kim Il Sung. Other children not shown in the tree are: Kim Man-il (1944–1947; child of Kim Jong-suk), Kim Kyong-jin (born 1952; child of Kim Song-ae), Kim Yong-il (1955–2000; child of Kim Song-ae), and Kim Kyong-suk (born 1951; child of Kim Song-ae). A stillborn daughter is also omitted. Kim Il Sung was reported to have had other children with women who he was not married to; they included Kim Hyŏn-nam (born 1972). Also, only some of the descendants of Kim Jong Il and Kim Jong Un (Kim Il Sung's successors) are included.) family tree of North Korea's ruling Kim family (Note: Korean names often have a variety of transliterations into English, which can be confusing. For example, "Kim Jong Chul" may also be written "Gim Jeong-cheol" or "Kim Jŏng-ch'ŏl" among many other variations. See Korean romanization for more information.) (Note: Huss, Kan; Frost, Clay. "North Korea's First Family: Mapping the personal and political drama of the Kim clan". msnbc.com. Archived from the original on 2012-02-04. (Confirms many, but not all, of the birth and death years. See individual articles for more references.))

Kim Song-ryeong; 1810–1899
Kim Ŭngu; 1848–1878
Kim Pohyŏn; 1871–1955
Kim Hyong-jik; 1894–1926	Kang Pan Sok; 1892–1932
Kim Jong-suk; 1917–1949	Kim Il Sung; 1912–1994	Kim Song-ae; 1924–2014	Kim Yong-ju; 1920–2021
Kim Young-sook; 1947–	Song Hye-rim; 1937–2002	Kim Jong Il; 1941? (Note: Official North Korean biographies of Kim Jong Il list his birth year as 1942. The Korean calendar is based upon the Chinese zodiac which is believed to characterize one's personality. The year 1942 (Year of the Horse), in addition to being 30 years since Kim Il Sung's birth may be viewed as a better year than others, thus creating a motive to lie about a birth year.)–2011	Ko Yong-hui; 1952–2004	Kim Ok; 1964–	Kim Kyong-hui; 1946–	Jang Song-thaek; 1946–2013	Kim Pyong Il; 1954–
Kim Sol-song; 1974–	Kim Jong-nam; 1971–2017	Kim Jong Chul; 1981–	Kim Jong Un; 1983? (Note: Official North Korean biographies of Kim Jong Un list his birth year as 1982. The Korean calendar is based upon the Chinese zodiac which is believed to characterize one's personality. The year 1982 (Year of the Dog), in addition to being 70 years since Kim Il Sung's birth, may be viewed as a better year than others, thus creating a motive to lie about a birth year.)–	Ri Sol-ju c. 1986–	Kim Yo Jong; 1987–
Kim Han-sol; 1995–	Kim Ju Ae c. 2012 (Note: Birth year for Kim Ju Ae is not publicly known. She may have been born in either late 2012 or early 2013.)–
