= Kang Pan Sok =

Mother of Kim Il Sung (1892–1932)

- 강반석
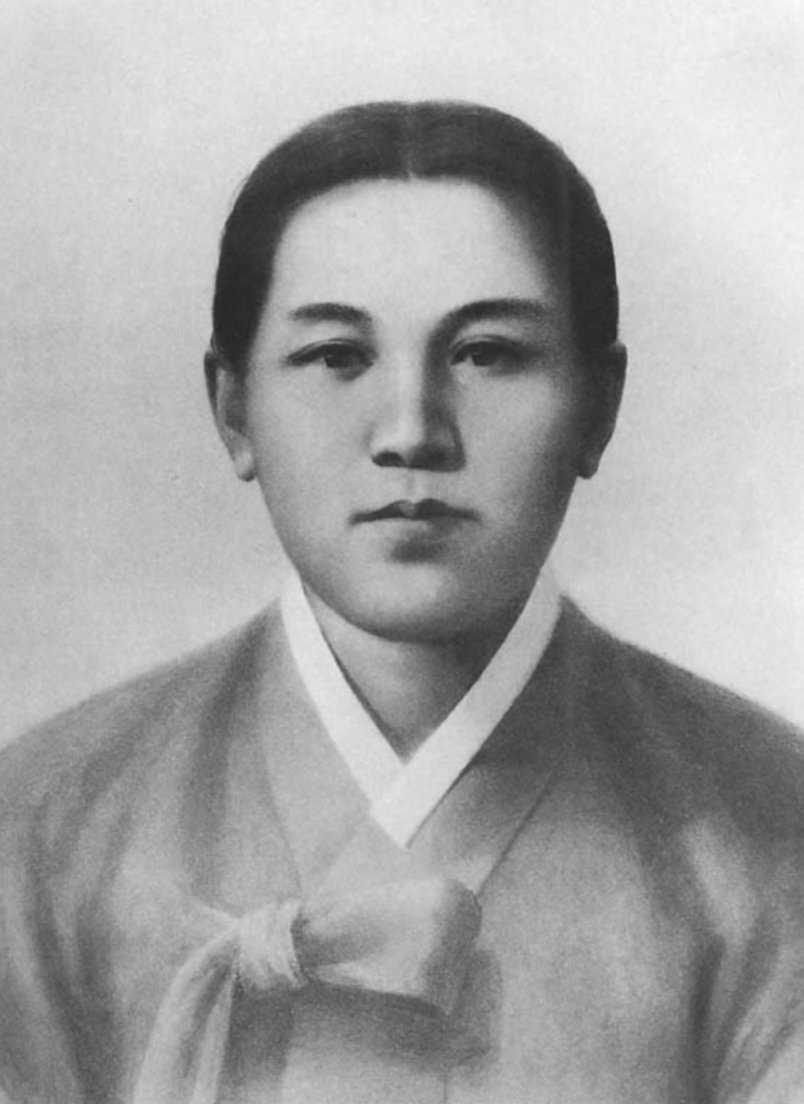
- Kang in 1928
- Born: 21 April 1892; Mangyongdae, Joseon
- Died: 31 July 1932 (aged 40); Jilin, Manchuria
- Spouse: Kim Hyong Jik
- Children: Kim Il Sung; Kim Chol-ju; Kim Yong-ju
- Parent(s): Kang Ton-uk (father, founder of Changdok school)

- Kang Pan Sok
- Hangul: 강반석
- Hanja: 康盤石
- RR: Gang Banseok
- MR: Kang Pansŏk

Kang Pan Sok (Korean: 강반석; 21 April 1892 – 31 July 1932) was the mother of North Korean leader Kim Il Sung.

== Biography ==
She came from the village of Chilgol and raised Kim on a small farm in Mangyongdae, both near Pyongyang. She accepted, but rarely participated in her husband's pro-independence activism. After the family fled to Manchuria to avoid arrest, she did not return to Korea. 21 April is a day of memorial for her in North Korea, when a wreath-laying ceremony is held at Chilgol Revolutionary Site.

== Legacy ==
In North Korea, Kang Pan Suk is referred to as the "Mother of Korea" or "Great Mother of Korea". Both titles are shared with Kim Jong Il's mother and Kim Jong Un's grandmother Kim Jong Suk. However, it was Kang Pan Suk who was the first family member of Kim Il Sung to have a cult of personality of her own to supplement that of her son, from the late 1960s onwards. In 1967, Rodong Sinmun praised her as the "mother of all". The same year, the Democratic Women's League initiated a campaign called "Learning from Madame Kang Pan Suk". There is a song by the name of "Mother of Korea" in her honor, as well as a hagiographic biography, also called The Mother of Korea (1968).

The Protestant Chilgol Church in Pyongyang is dedicated to the memory of Kang Pan Sok, who was a Presbyterian. Her name meant "rock", having been named for Saint Peter.

Select (Note: To keep the tree of manageable size, it omits five out of the seven known legitimate children of Kim Il Sung. Other children not shown in the tree are: Kim Man-il (1944–1947; child of Kim Jong-suk), Kim Kyong-jin (born 1952; child of Kim Song-ae), Kim Yong-il (1955–2000; child of Kim Song-ae), and Kim Kyong-suk (born 1951; child of Kim Song-ae). A stillborn daughter is also omitted. Kim Il Sung was reported to have had other children with women who he was not married to; they included Kim Hyŏn-nam (born 1972). Also, only some of the descendants of Kim Jong Il and Kim Jong Un (Kim Il Sung's successors) are included.) family tree of North Korea's ruling Kim family (Note: Korean names often have a variety of transliterations into English, which can be confusing. For example, "Kim Jong Chul" may also be written "Gim Jeong-cheol" or "Kim Jŏng-ch'ŏl" among many other variations. See Korean romanization for more information.) (Note: Huss, Kan; Frost, Clay. "North Korea's First Family: Mapping the personal and political drama of the Kim clan". msnbc.com. Archived from the original on 4 February 2012. (Confirms many, but not all, of the birth and death years. See individual articles for more references.))

Kim Song-ryeong; 1810–1899
Kim Ŭngu; 1848–1878
Kim Pohyŏn; 1871–1955
Kim Hyong-jik; 1894–1926	Kang Pan Sok; 1892–1932
Kim Jong-suk; 1917–1949	Kim Il Sung; 1912–1994	Kim Song-ae; 1924–2014	Kim Yong-ju; 1920–2021
Kim Young-sook; 1947–	Song Hye-rim; 1937–2002	Kim Jong Il; 1941? (Note: Official North Korean biographies of Kim Jong Il list his birth year as 1942. The Korean calendar is based upon the Chinese zodiac which is believed to characterize one's personality. The year 1942 (Year of the Horse), in addition to being 30 years since Kim Il Sung's birth may be viewed as a better year than others, thus creating a motive to lie about a birth year.)–2011	Ko Yong-hui; 1952–2004	Kim Ok; 1964–	Kim Kyong-hui; 1946–	Jang Song-thaek; 1946–2013	Kim Pyong Il; 1954–
Kim Sol-song; 1974–	Kim Jong-nam; 1971–2017	Kim Jong Chul; 1981–	Kim Jong Un; 1983? (Note: Official North Korean biographies of Kim Jong Un list his birth year as 1982. The Korean calendar is based upon the Chinese zodiac which is believed to characterize one's personality. The year 1982 (Year of the Dog), in addition to being 70 years since Kim Il Sung's birth, may be viewed as a better year than others, thus creating a motive to lie about a birth year.)–	Ri Sol-ju c. 1986–	Kim Yo Jong; 1987–
Kim Han-sol; 1995–	Kim Ju Ae c. 2012 (Note: Birth year for Kim Ju Ae is not publicly known. She may have been born in either late 2012 or early 2013.)–
