= Ko Young-hee =

Ko Young-hee (고영희) may refer to:

- Ko Young-hee (sport shooter) (born 1956), South Korean sports shooter
- Ko Yeong-hee (born 1980), South Korean speed skater

== See also ==
- Ko Yong-hui (고용희)
