= Kim Hyŏnggwŏn =

Korean independence activist (1905–1936)

- 김형권
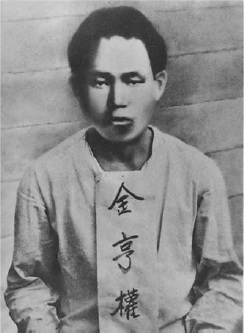
- Kim Hyŏnggwŏn in prison with a name tag
- Born: 4 November 1905; Nam Ri, Kopyong Sub-county, Taedong County, South Pyongan Province, Korean Empire
- Died: 12 January 1936 (aged 30); Seodaemun Prison, Seoul, Korea
- Resting place: Revolutionary Martyrs' Cemetery
- Occupation: Guerrilla
- Organization: Young Communist League of Korea
- Parent(s): Kim Pohyŏn (father); Yi Poik (mother)
- Relatives: Kim dynasty

Korean name
- Hangul: 김형권
- Hanja: 金亨權
- RR: Gim Hyeonggwon
- MR: Kim Hyŏnggwŏn

Kim Hyŏnggwŏn (Korean: 김형권; 4 November 1905 – 12 January 1936) was a Korean revolutionary. He is known for attacking a Japanese police station in Japanese-occupied Korea and subsequently dying in Seoul's Seodaemun Prison where he was serving his sentence.

Kim Hyŏnggwŏn was an uncle of the founding North Korean leader, Kim Il Sung. As such, he is among the most celebrated of the Kim family members in North Korean propaganda. Kimhyonggwon County in North Korea is named after him.

== Personal life ==
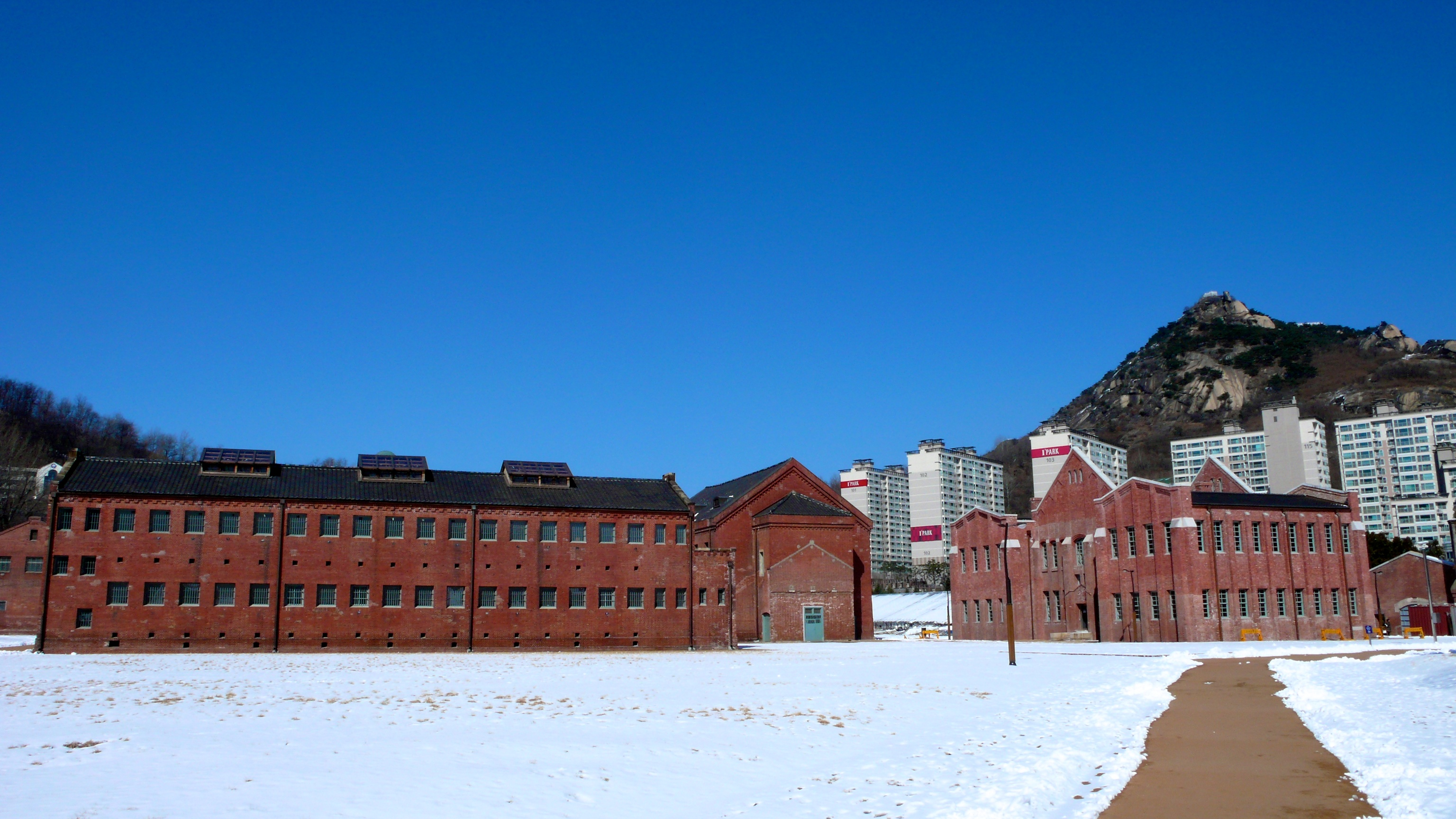
Seodaemun Prison, where Kim Hyŏnggwŏn died, was used for keeping anti-colonial activists in custody.

In his youth, Kim Hyŏnggwŏn studied in Sunhwa school near his home in present-day Mangyongdae, Pyongyang.

Kim was a revolutionary fighter and an active communist in the 1930s. His personality has been described as "hot-tempered". In August 1930, he led a small detachment of guerrillas across the Amnok (Yalu) river to Japanese-occupied Korea from Manchuria. His small group's actions near Pungsan at that time were noticed by the Japanese press. He captured two Japanese police cars, and both of these acts occurred in mountainous terrain. Some time after attacking a Japanese police station in Pungsan, he was arrested near Hongwon. He was sentenced to 15 years in prison when he was 28 years old. He died on 12 January 1936, during his sentence in Seoul's Seodaemun Prison, where anti-Japanese dissidents were detained from 1910 to 1945 in cruel conditions.

Kim Il Sung remarks in his autobiography With the Century, that it was a corrupt yet close Manchurian local official, Chae Jin-yong, who betrayed his uncle and became an informer against him.

== Legacy ==
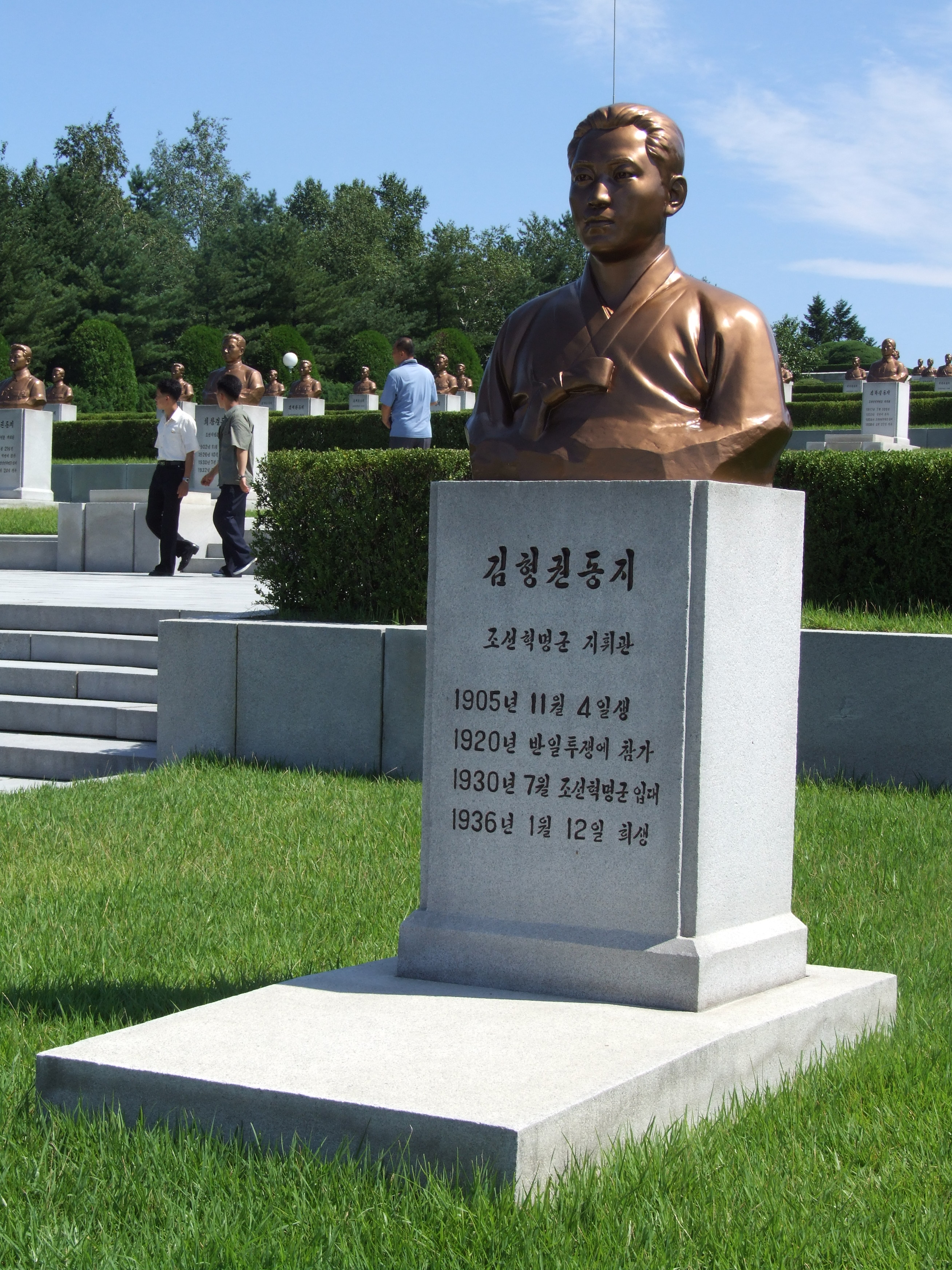
Bust at the Revolutionary Martyrs' Cemetery

Kim Hyŏnggwŏn is among the most important Kim family members in propaganda, and comparable in that context to other prominent family members like Kim Il Sung's father Kim Hyong-jik, or great grandfather Kim Ŭngu, who is claimed to have been involved in the General Sherman incident. North Korean propaganda insists that most family members were in some way participating in the foundation of the North Korean state and among them Kim Hyŏnggwŏn is portrayed as having been sacrificed for anti-Japanese struggle and the revolution.

Kim Hyŏnggwŏn was included into the personality cult in 1976. North Korean media uses similar honorifics for him as they use with Kim Il Sung, Kim Jong Il, Kim Jong Un and Kim Jong Suk.

Kimhyonggwon County, previously known as Pungsan, in southeastern Ryanggang Province, was renamed after him in August 1990. There is also a Kim Hyong Gwon Teachers' College named after him, and Hamnam University of Education Nr. 1 was renamed Kim Hyong Gwon University of Education in 1990. Both of them are in Sinpo. Various sites of honor and statues have been made in Kim's memory. Once every five years, a ceremony is held on the days of his death and birth.

A North Korean film A Fire Burning All Over the World was made in 1977. It deals with both Kang Pan Sok and Kim Hyŏnggwŏn's revolutionary deeds. The film was also the first one to portray Kim Il Sung.

In 2010, South Korea awarded Kim Hyŏnggwŏn the Patriotic Medal, 4th grade of the Order of Merit for National Foundation, for his role in the independence movement apparently without knowing that he was a relative of Kim Il Sung.

== See also ==
- North Korea's cult of personality
- Gwangju Student Independence Movement
- June 10th Movement
- March First Movement
- Northeast Anti-Japanese United Army
