= Ko Yong Suk =

North Korean defector (born 1958)

Ko Yong Suk (Korean: 고용숙; born 1958) is the aunt of North Korean dictator Kim Jong Un. Her elder sister, Ko Yong-hui, was the mistress of Kim Jong Il and mother of Kim Jong Un. Ko Yong Suk defected to the United States in 1998. Ko looks very much like her elder sister. She took care of Kim Jong Un and his sister in Switzerland and settled into a middle-class quiet life in America.

== Pre-defection ==
Ko's first son and Kim Jong Un were playmates from birth in North Korea. She says this son and Kim Jong Un are the same age and born in 1984. She changed both their diapers. Ko stated that even as a young child Kim Jong Un showed personality traits such as defiance of parents, intolerance, hunger strikes, and a short temper that would later become stronger and that he knew at age 8 he would one day rule North Korea. Even generals bowed down to him at the young age of 8. Ko and her family arrived in Switzerland in 1992 and Kim Jong Un in 1996 and they took care of him again, as well as his sister Kim Yo Jong.

== Defection and later life ==
Kim Jong Il handpicked Ri Gang to marry Ko. Ri Gang is also known as Pak Kun. The couple would go on summer vacations with Kim Jong Il and other relatives. Ko and her husband, Ri Gang, contacted the American Embassy in Bern, Switzerland, to defect in 1998. They were taken to an American military base in Frankfurt and debriefed for months. The Central Intelligence Agency (CIA) helped them and gave them $280,000 to buy a house in New York. The house is several hours drive from New York City. The family defected because of the cruelty they saw in the North Korean regime and they were concerned what would happen when Kim Jong Il died, leaving them without a direct connection to North Korea's ruler. They run a dry cleaning business. In order to protect them the family lives under assumed names and the city they live in is kept secret. The couple has two sons and one daughter, all educated professionals. The eldest son is a mathematician, the other son helps with the family business, and the daughter works in computer science. None of them are interested in Korea, North nor South. The CIA still visits them from time to time to identify people in photographs.

In 2015, Ko sued three defectors who "spread false stories" about her. The allegedly false claims are about her and Ri having plastic surgery after defecting, having Kim Jong Un's half-brother expelled from North Korea, and managing a secret fund for Kim Jong Il. She sought damages of 60 million won ($51,600 USD) in a South Korean court.

== See also ==
- North Korean Defectors' Day
