= Yi Poik =

Paternal grandmother of Kim Il Sung

- 이보익
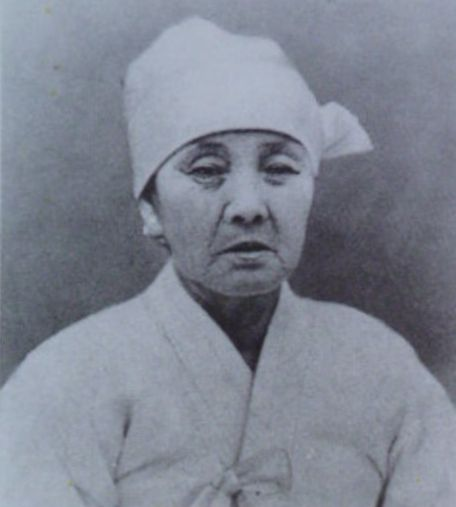
- Born: 31 May 1876; Pyongyang, Pyongan Province, Joseon
- Died: 15 October 1959 (aged 83); Pyongyang, Pyongan Province, North Korea
- Spouse: Kim Pohyŏn
- Children: 6, including Kim Hyong-jik and Kim Hyŏnggwŏn
- Relatives: Kim family

- Yi Poik
- Hangul: 이보익
- RR: I Boik
- MR: I Poik

Yi Poik (Korean: 이보익; 31 May 1876 – 18 October 1959) was the paternal grandmother of Kim Il Sung, great-grandmother of Kim Jong Il and great-great grandmother of Kim Jong Un. She was a farmer from Pyongyang, South Pyongan Province, North Korea, and the wife of Kim Pohyŏn, who was also a farmer.

== Life ==
She was born on 31 May 1876 in Pyongyang, Pyongan Province, Joseon.

She eventually married Kim Pohyŏn, a farmer, and gave birth to three sons and three daughters: eldest son Kim Hyong-jik (father of Kim Il Sung), second son Kim Hyongnok, third son Kim Hyŏnggwŏn, eldest daughter Kim Gu-il, second daughter Kim Hyong-sil, and third daughter Kim Hyong-bok.

On 15 August 1945, her grandson Kim Il Sung returned to China from the Soviet Union.

== Death and legacy ==
She died on 18 October 1959, at the age of 83 and a statue in her honor stands at the Revolutionary Martyrs' Cemetery.

Yi Poik and Kim Pohyŏn were likened as "patriots" by the Editorial Committee for the Short Biography of Kim Il Sung.

On 19 August 2013, wreaths were sent by various North Korean organizations to the tombs of Yi Poik and Kim Pohyŏn.
