= First Lady of North Korea =

Wife of the supreme leader of North Korea

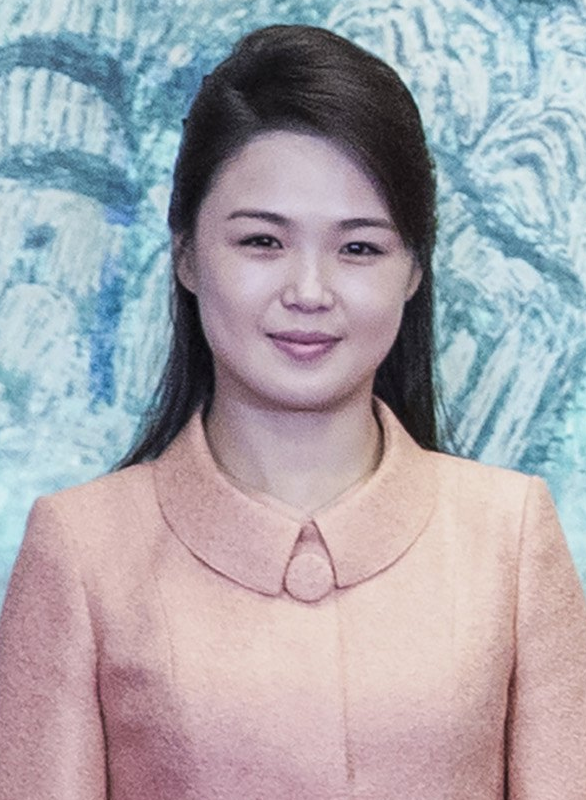
- Incumbent; Ri Sol Ju since 15 April 2018
- Style: Respected First Lady
- Residence: Ryongsong Residence, Pyongyang, North Korea
- Inaugural holder: Kim Song-ae
- Formation: 17 December 1963

The first lady of North Korea is the wife of the supreme leader of North Korea and holds the official title of Respected First Lady (Korean: 존경하는 녀사). The inaugural holder of the title was Kim Song-ae, the second wife of the first supreme leader Kim Il Sung. The title was not used during the tenure of the second supreme leader Kim Jong Il. It was revived by the third supreme leader Kim Jong Un, with his wife Ri Sol Ju being the second and current holder.

== History ==
As the wife of the first supreme leader Kim Il Sung, Kim Song-ae assumed the duties of first lady in 1963, eleven years after their marriage. The position was left vacant under the leadership of the second supreme leader Kim Jong Il, who is believed to have married twice and to have had three domestic partnerships at different times.

The third supreme leader Kim Jong Un reestablished the position in April 2018 when Ri Sol Ju, whom he married in 2009, was elevated from the title of "comrade" to "Respected First Lady". The promotion occurred ahead of the April 2018 inter-Korean summit, where Ri and South Korean first lady Kim Jung-sook were in attendance.

== List ==
No.	Portrait	Name (birth – death)	Tenure	Age at tenure start	Husband (year married)
1		Kim Song-ae (1924–2014)	17 December 1963 – 15 August 1974	38 years, 353 days	Kim Il Sung (m. 1952)
2	Portrait of Ri Sol Ju	Ri Sol Ju (b. 1989)	15 April 2018 – present	28 years, 158 days	Kim Jong Un (m. 2009)
