= Badaogou =

Badaogou 八道沟镇
- Town
- Bādàogōu Zhèn
- Location in Jilin Location in China
- Coordinates: 41°30′57″N 127°15′58″E
- Country: People's Republic of China
- Province: Jilin
- Prefecture-level city: Baishan
- County-level city: Changbai

Area
  - Total: 112.9 km^{2} (43.6 sq mi)

Population (2010)
  - Total: 8,101
  - Density: 71.74/km^{2} (185.8/sq mi)
- Time zone: UTC+8 (China Standard)

Badaogou (Chinese: 八道沟镇; pinyin: Bādàogōu Zhèn) is a town located in Changbai Korean Autonomous County, Baishan, Jilin, China. According to the 2010 census, Badaogou had a population of 8,101, including 4,179 males and 3,922 females. The population was distributed as follows: 1,048 people aged under 14, 6,236 people aged between 15 and 64, and 817 people aged over 65.

== See also ==
- List of township-level divisions of Jilin
