= Revolutionary Martyrs' Cemetery =

Cemetery in Pyongyang, North Korea

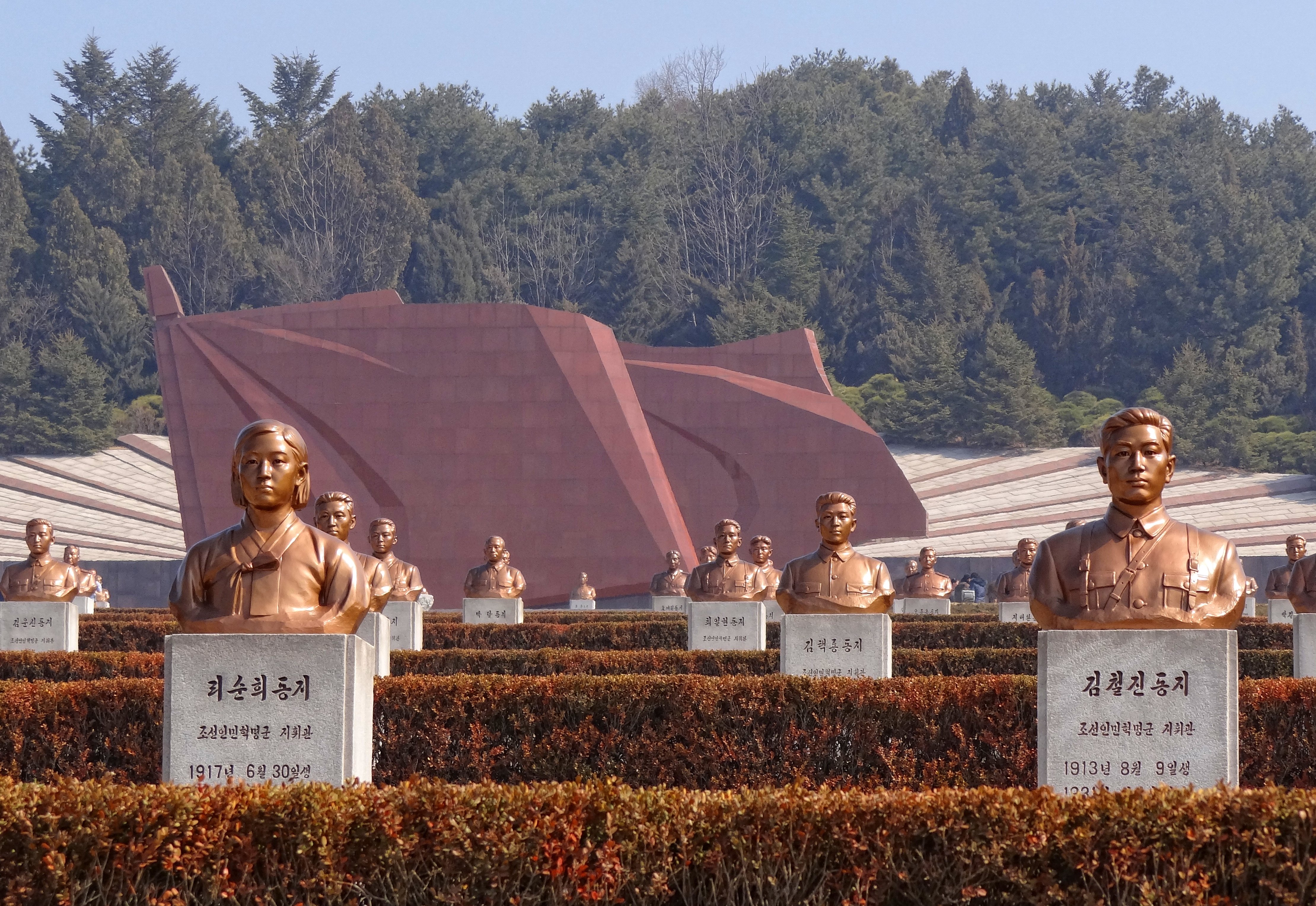
- Busts and main monument
- Interactive map of Revolutionary Martyrs' Cemetery

Details
- Established: 1975
- Location: Mount Taesong, Taesong-guyok, Pyongyang
- Country: North Korea
- Coordinates: 39°04′42″N 125°49′40″E
- Type: Military cemetery
- Revolutionary Martyrs' Cemetery
- Chosŏn'gŭl: 대성산혁명렬사릉
- Hancha: 大城山革命烈士陵
- Revised Romanization: Daeseongsan hyeongmyeong ryeolsareung
- McCune–Reischauer: Taesŏngsan hyŏngmyŏng ryŏlsarŭng

Taesongsan Revolutionary Martyrs' Cemetery (Korean: 대성산혁명렬사릉) is a cemetery and memorial to the North Korean soldiers fighting for freedom and independence against Japanese rule. The 30-hectare site is located near the top of Mount Taesong (Taesongsan) in the Taesong-guyok, just outside Pyongyang, capital of North Korea.

The cemetery with hundreds of tombs was completed in 1975, and in October 1985 it was renovated and expanded. Its design inspired the design of two African cemeteries, National Heroes' Acre in Zimbabwe and Heroes' Acre in Namibia.

== Description ==
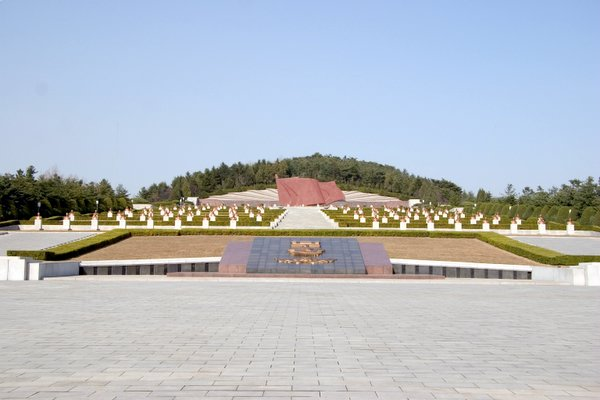
View of the cemetery

The entrance to the cemetery is marked by a monumental gate in Korean style. Each of the graves is provided with a bronze bust. At the far end of the memorial there is a conspicuous red flag made of granite. Heo-nik Kwon and Byung-Ho Chung (2012) covered the cemetery in their publication North Korea: Beyond Charismatic Politics, noting the cemetery's significance in politics, where it can not only satisfy the North Korean need for revolutionary narratives, but also compensate for its large-scale absence of ordinary military cemeteries.

=== Notable people buried ===
- Kim Pohyŏn, father of Kim Hyong-jik, grandfather of Kim Il Sung
- Kim Jong-suk, first wife of Kim Il Sung.
- Kang Pan-sok, mother of Kim Il Sung.
- Kim Ch'aek, general and politician.
- Ri Yong-suk, politician.
- Hyŏn Chun-hyŏk, politician.

== See also ==
- Kumsusan Palace of the Sun
- Patriotic Martyrs' Cemetery
- Memorial Museum of Combat Feats at the Overseas Military Operations
- Daejeon National Cemetery
- Seoul National Cemetery
- National Heroes' Acre (Zimbabwe)
- Heroes' Acre (Namibia)
- Feldherrnhalle
