= Comrades and Strangers =

Book by Michael Harrold

Comrades and Strangers: Behind the Closed Doors of North Korea
- Author: Michael Harrold
- Language: English
- Genre: Memoir
- Publisher: John Wiley and Sons
- Publication date: 2004
- ISBN: 978-0-470-86976-5

Comrades and Strangers: Behind the Closed Doors of North Korea is the memoir of Michael Harrold, the first British person to reside in North Korea. The book was written to demystify North Korean society.

== History ==
Harrold, who sought a year or two of adventure after graduating from university, flew to Pyongyang, North Korea, in the spring of 1987 after accepting employment in the country's Foreign Languages Publishing House, where he assisted in the translation of President Kim Il Sung’s words into English. In the book, Harrold intertwines his personal experiences living and working in the country with the recent history of Korea.

In the early days, Harrold enjoyed his important status and the accompanying trappings of his work in North Korea. In addition to revising the words of President Kim Il Sung, he was given a prominent position at ceremonial events. Moreover, he was relatively well-paid. This relatively high salary allowed for a social life that was closed to all but the other foreigners in Pyongyang and a small North Korean elite. Although his interaction with North Koreans was severely restricted, he did become acquainted with some of Pyongyang’s better off.

After nearly seven years in North Korea, he was forced to leave the country and he was left with a deep sense of resentment toward North Korea. Looking back on his experiences, Harrold admits his earlier naïveté, when he believed that "international problems could best be resolved by ordinary people over a pint or two of beer (403)." In the end, he was critical of North Korea; nevertheless, he refused to blame the North Korean leadership for all the problems facing the country today, arguing that international actors, namely the United States, share the responsibility.

== Release details ==
- Comrades and Strangers: Behind the Closed Doors of North Korea John Wiley and Sons, 2004, ISBN 978-0-470-86976-5
