= Kim Jong-suk =

Wife of Kim Il Sung (1917–1949)

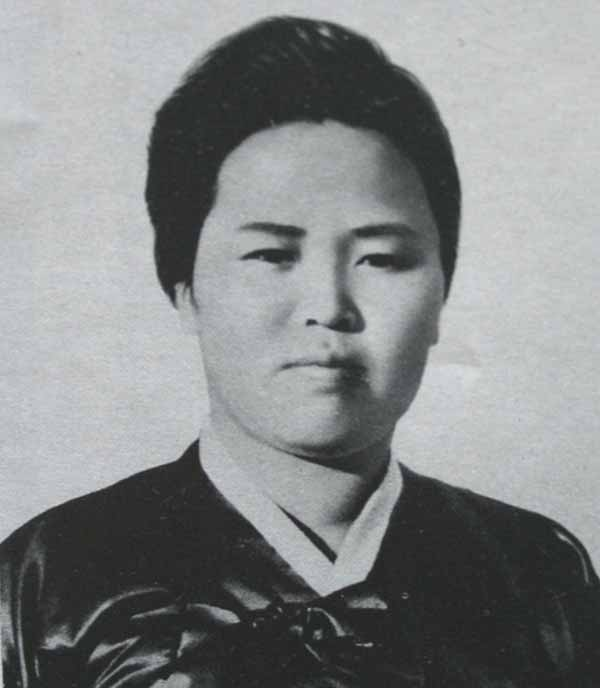
- Kim in 1945
- Born: 24 December 1917; Hoeryong, Kankyōhoku Province, Korea, Empire of Japan
- Died: 22 September 1949 (aged 31); Pyongyang, North Korea
- Resting place: Revolutionary Martyrs' Cemetery, Taesong-guyok, Pyongyang
- Spouse: Kim Il Sung (m. 1941)
- Children: Kim Jong Il; Kim Man-il; Kim Kyong-hui
- Awards: Hero of the Republic, Order of the National Flag

Korean name
- Hangul: 김정숙
- Hanja: 金正淑
- RR: Gim Jeongsuk
- MR: Kim Chŏngsuk

Kim Jong-suk (Note: Also romanized as Kim Chŏng-suc, Gim Jeong-suk, Kim Jong Suk, Kim Jong-sook) (Korean: 김정숙; 24 December 1917 (Note: Though the official biography states 25 December 1917) – 22 September 1949) was a North Korean revolutionary, anti-Japanese guerrilla, Communist activist, the first wife of North Korean leader Kim Il Sung and the mother of former leader Kim Jong Il.

== Biography ==
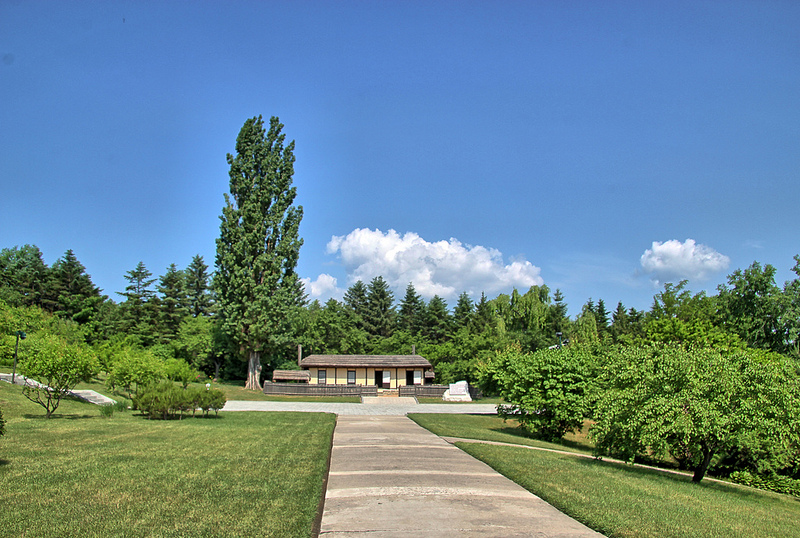
Birthplace of Kim Jong-suk in Hoeryong

Kim Jong-suk was born on 24 December 1917 in Hoeryong County, Kankyōhoku-dō, Empire of Japan (now in North Hamgyong Province, North Korea). Suh Dae-sook writes that she was "the elder of two daughters of a poor farmer." However, the Korean Central News Agency (KCNA), states that she had a younger brother, Kim Ki-song (김기송), who was born 9 February 1921.

Kim Jong-suk followed her mother to Manchuria to look for her father, but they discovered that he had already died there. Soon after that, her mother died and she became an orphan. Most sources agree that Kim Jong-suk then joined Kim Il Sung's guerrilla force in 1935 or 1936 as a kitchen helper. The KCNA, however, reports that Kim Jong-suk and Kim Ki-song joined the guerrilla forces after their mother and their elder brother's wife were murdered by the Japanese.

During this time, Kim Jong-suk worked various odd jobs, and was arrested by the Japanese in 1937 in an undercover attempt to secure food and supplies. After her release, she rejoined the guerrillas, where she cooked, sewed, and washed.

It was around this time that Kim Jong-suk reportedly saved Kim Il Sung's life. Baik Bong relates the story in Kim Il Sung's official biography:

One day, while the unit was marching under the General's [Kim Il Sung] command, five or six enemies unexpectedly approached through the reeds and aimed at the General. The danger was imminent. Without losing a moment, Comrade Kim Jung Sook [Kim Jong Suk] shielded the General with her own body and shot down an enemy with her revolver. The General also shot down the second enemy. Two revolvers spurted fire in turn and annihilated the enemy in a twinkle. But this was not the only time such dangers occurred, and each time, Comrade Kim Jung Sook rose to the occasion with fury, and protected the Headquarters of the revolution at the risk of her life.

Kim Jong-suk married Kim Il Sung in the Soviet Union, most likely in 1941. On 16 February 1941 (or 1942, sources vary), in the Soviet village of Vyatskoye, Kim Jong-suk had Kim Jong Il, who was given the Russian name "Yuri Irsenovich Kim," and the nickname "Yura." In 1944, Kim Jong-suk had Kim Man-il, in Korean and "Alexander" or "Shura" in Russian. In 1946, she gave birth to a daughter, Kim Kyŏng-hŭi. Augustina Vardugina, a woman from Vyatskoye, was in her teens when Kim Il Sung's guerrilla group camped there. She remembers Kim Jong-suk, and how she would come to the village to barter military rations for chicken and eggs. Her son, Kim Jong Il, would be holding her hand.

A year after the establishment of North Korea and until her death, Kim Jong-suk was the first lady. According to some accounts, Kim Jong-suk "was a small, quiet woman, not particularly well educated, but friendly and life-loving." Major General N.G. Lebedev, an executive Soviet officer during the Soviet occupation of North Korea, recalled Kim Jong-suk as "a vivacious and generous lady who always cooked enormous amounts of food for the hungry Soviet generals when they visited Kim's home."

=== Death ===
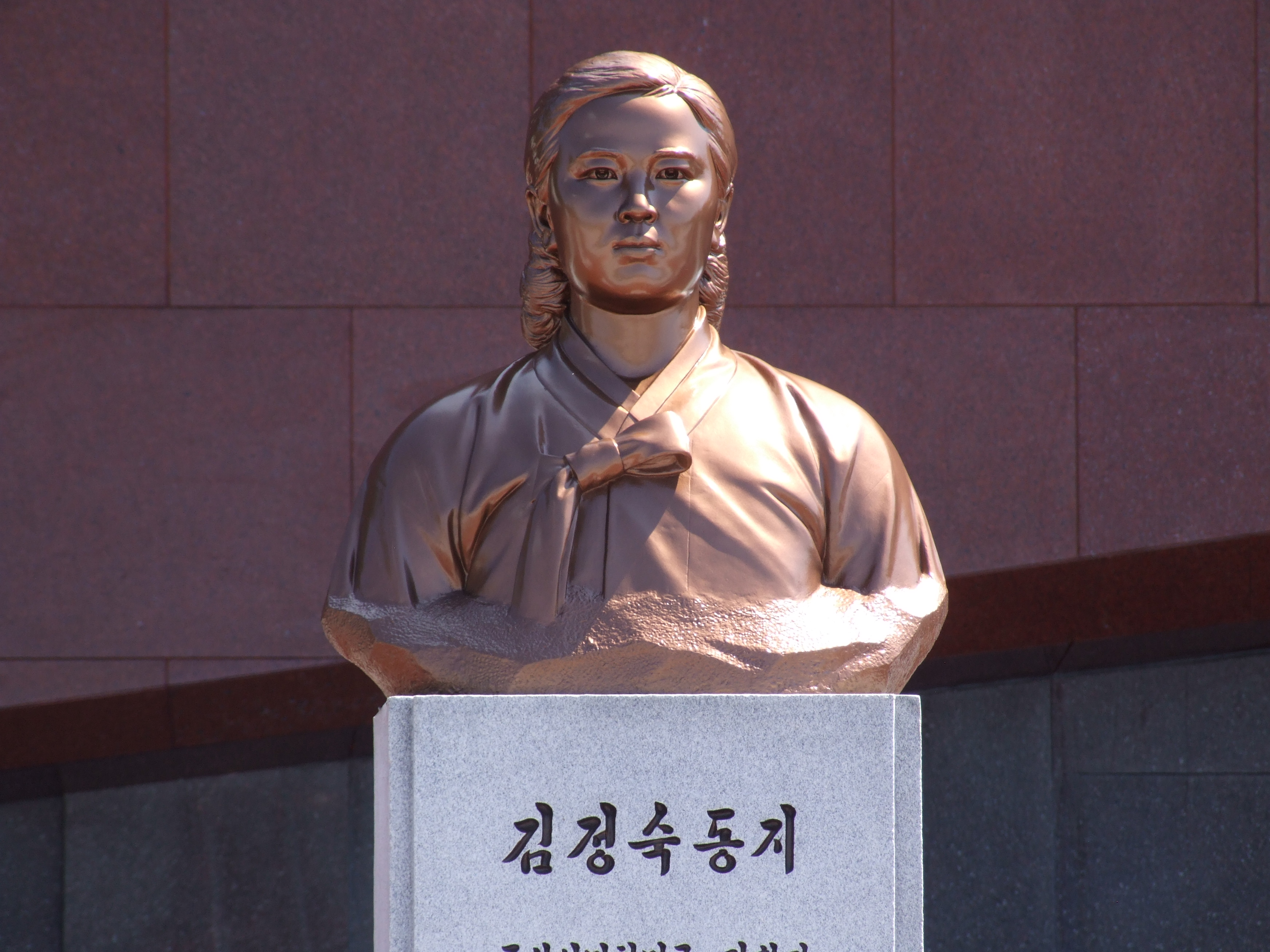
Grave of Kim Jong-suk at the Revolutionary Martyrs' Cemetery

In commentary on one edition of Kim Il Sung's official autobiography, With the Century, it is stated that she died of an ectopic pregnancy on September 22, 1949. According to Harrold, she died from "the hardships she had endured during the years as a guerrilla fighter."

== Legacy ==
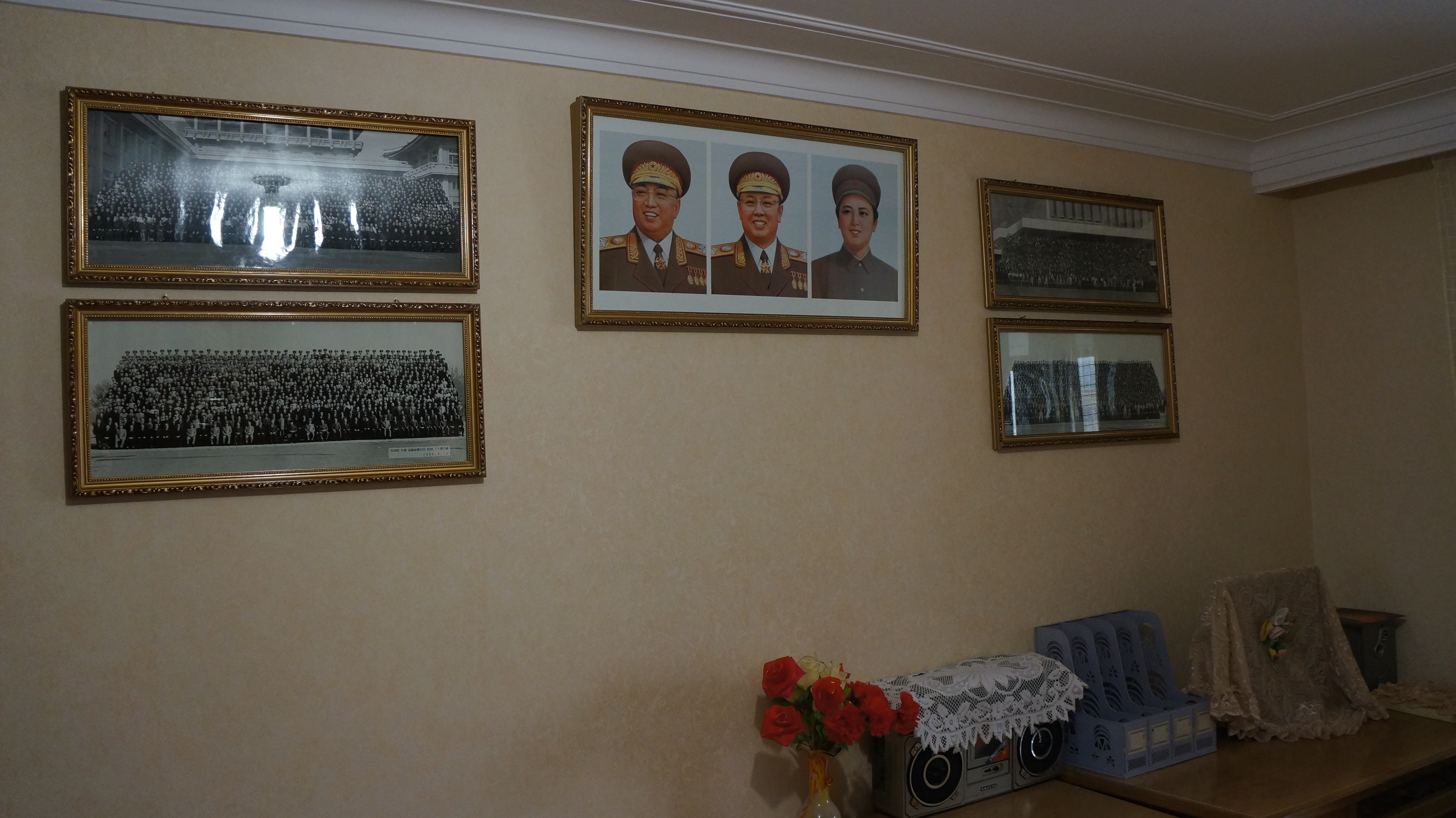
Portrait of Kim Jong-suk alongside Kim Il Sung and Kim Jong Il in a private home

After Kim Jong Il succeeded Kim Il Sung, he began to make his mother, Kim Jong-suk, into "a revolutionary immortal." This campaign created "a holy trinity known as the 'Three Generals' [of Paektu Mountain]". Instead of touting Kim Jong-suk as the quiet woman that she was, she became the heroine of the revolution. The website of the National Democratic Front of South Korea (NDFSK) says she was "a peerless heroine ... an anti-Japanese heroine ... a faithful retainer who faithfully carried out General Kim Il Sung's will but also a lifeguard who safeguarded the General of every dangerous movement."

Kim Jong-suk was recorded to have "conducted on-the-spot guidance sessions" and was a "great strategist". In her home town of Hoeryong, "a museum, a library, a statue, a square and the house in which she was born" are "devoted to the 'Mother of Korea'". She arranged parachute training and won several shooting competitions. One story says that she would wash Kim Il Sung's socks and dry them in her bosom, or cut her hair and spread it in Kim Il Sung's shoes.

Michael Harrold, in his memoir Comrades and Strangers, relates several stories he heard about Kim Jong-suk while in North Korea. According to him, there is a memorial near Mount Kumgang that marks where Kim Jong-suk stopped "when she realized she had forgotten to bring the great leader's lunch, and had turned back to prepare something to eat for when he returned from the mountains." Kim Jong-suk is also credited with inspiring Kim Jong Il to build the Ryugyong Hotel. Harrold relates that Kim Jong-suk told a young Kim Jong Il that he "must build tall buildings for the people, of 30 or even 40 stories," and the son replied that he would build housing 100 stories high. This led to the construction of the 105-story Ryugyong Hotel, which is still not opened.

On 1 June 2015, the Daily NK reported that Kim Jong-suk's wedding ring had gone missing from Pyongyang's Korean Revolution Museum sometime in late May. Items belonging to key figures of the Kim family are of great importance. In 2010, state television aired a show dedicated to the story behind the ring, which was, purportedly, given to her by Kim Il Sung in 1938 for her role in the anti-Japanese guerrilla movement.

Many places in North Korea are named after her, including Kimjongsuk County, Kim Jong Suk Naval Academy, Kim Jong-suk Teacher Training College, Kim Jong-suk Rest Home, and Kim Jong-suk Pyongyang Silk Mill.

The Kim family tree (DPRK)

Na Hyeon-Jik	Kim Song-Ryeong
Lady Lee	Kim Ŭngu
Yi Poik	Kim Pohyŏn
Kang Pan Sok	Kim Hyong-jik	Kim Hyong-gwon
Kim Song-ae	Kim Il Sung	Kim Jong-suk	Kim Yong-ju
Kim Pyong-il	Kim Jong Il	Kim Kyong-hui	Kim Man-il

=== In North Korean News ===
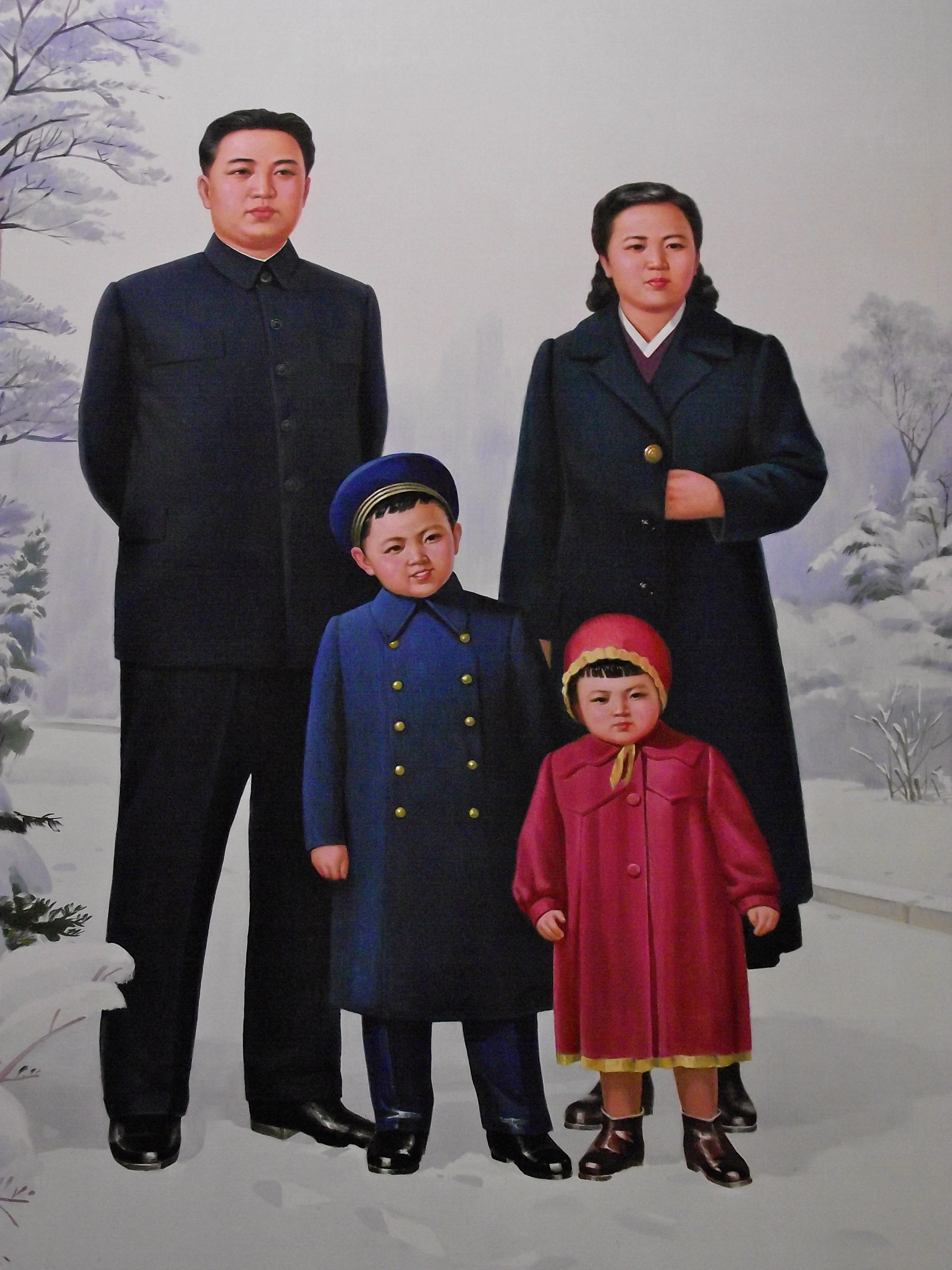
Kim Jong-suk is revered as the mother of Kim Jong Il in North Korea. Also pictured are Kim Il Sung and Kim Kyong-hui.

In North Korean News the KCNA regularly reports on Kim Jong-suk, either honoring her memory or describing her revolutionary activities. The following are headlines from articles relating to Kim Jong-suk from 2012:

- National Meeting on International Women's Day Held: "Kim Jong-suk, an anti-Japanese war hero, upheld the original idea and policy of Kim Il Sung and performed distinguished feats in the development of the movement for women's emancipation in Korea." (8 March 2012)
- Wax Replica of Kim Jong-suk Displayed: "A hall housing a wax replica of the anti-Japanese war hero, Kim Jong-suk, was opened at the International Friendship Exhibition House in the Democratic People's Republic of Korea on Tuesday." (26 April 2012)
- Wax sculpture dedicated to great woman: "She carried out secret political tasks assigned by Kim Il Sung" and "She brought up Kim Jong Il as the Shining Star of Mt. Paektu to maintain the lifeline of the Korean revolution." Government officials Kim Ki Nam, Secretary of WPK Choe Thea Bok, Yang Hyong Sop, and KPA General Pak Jae Gyong made statements at the dedication. Zhang Molei, Director of the Great Man Wax Museum of China also made a speech. (5 May 2012)
- Moran Hill Associated with Patriotic Will of Peerlessly Great Persons: "On March 2, 1946 President Kim Il Sung, leader Kim Jong Il and woman commander of Mt. Paektu Kim Jong-suk mounted the hill together." (17 June 2012)
- Collection of Music Anecdotes "Mother and Song" Published: "The collection contains four parts of 95 anecdotes about anti-Japanese war hero Kim Jong-suk who struggled, regarding songs as a mighty treasured sword along with arms of the revolution and an appendix of music of relevant songs." (18 July 2012)
- Pujon Revolutionary Battle Site of DPRK Introduced by ITAR-TASS: The events of the Pujon Revolutionary Battle Site, "where Kim Jong-suk, a model of devotedly defending the leader, waged revolutionary activities." (7 August 2012)
- Kim Jong-suk's Life Lauded by Foreign Organizations: "A Brazilian organization and a regional body posted special write-ups on their Internet websites on the occasion of the 63rd anniversary of the passing of Kim Jong-suk, anti-Japanese war hero." (2 October 2012)

== Awards ==
- Hero of the Republic, 21 September 1972 (posthumous)
- Order of the National Flag (1st Class with Neck Chain)

== See also ==
- Kim Tu-bong
- Kim Jong Il

== Notes and references ==
=== Works cited ===
- Corfield, Justin (2014). "Kim Jong Suk (1917–1949)". Historical Dictionary of Pyongyang. London: Anthem Press. pp. 94–96. ISBN 978-1-78308-341-1.
- Sessler, Warren E.; McDaniel, Paul (2009). Military and Civil Awards of the Democratic People's Republic of Korea (DPRK). Henderson, Nevada: Sessler Incorporated. ISBN 978-0-615-28482-8.
