= Ko Yong-hui =

Mother of Kim Jong Un (1952–2004)

- Born: Takada Hime; 26 June 1952; Osaka, Japan
- Died: 13 August 2004 (aged 52); Institut Curie Hospital, Paris, France or Pyongyang, North Korea
- Resting place: Taesongsan, Pyongyang, North Korea
- Partner(s): Kim Jong Il (1977–2004; her death)
- Children: Kim Jong Chul; Kim Jong Un; Kim Yo Jong

Korean name
- Hangul: 고용희
- Hanja: 高容姬
- RR: Go Yonghui
- MR: Ko Yonghŭi

Ko Yong-hui (Korean: 고용희; Korean pronunciation: [ko̞.jo̞ŋ.βwi]; 26 June 1952 – 13 August 2004), also spelled Ko Young-hee, was the mistress of North Korean supreme leader Kim Jong Il and the mother of his successor, Kim Jong Un. Within North Korea, she is only referred to by titles, such as "The Respected Mother who is the Most Faithful and Loyal 'Subject' to the Dear Leader Comrade Supreme Commander", "The Mother of Pyongyang", and "The Mother of Great Songun Korea".

== Biography ==
Takada Hime (高田姫) was born on 26 June 1952 in Ikuno Korea Town, Osaka, Japan, according to Japanese official records. Her father, Ko Gyon-tek, worked in an Osaka sewing factory run by Japan's ministry of war, a 16th-generation descendant of the Joseon scholar official, Ko Tŭkchong. Her mother was also Korean. She, along with her family, moved to North Korea in May 1961 or 1962 as part of a repatriation program. In the early 1970s, she began working as a dancer for the Mansudae Art Troupe in Pyongyang. Her younger sister Ko Yong Suk sought asylum from the U.S. embassy in Bern, Switzerland, while she was living there taking care of Kim Jong Un during his school days, according to South Korea's National Intelligence Service; U.S. officials arranged Ko Yong Suk's departure from the country without consulting South Korean officials.

It is thought that Ko and Kim Jong Il first met in 1972. In 1981, Ko had a son named Kim Jong Chul, her first child with Kim. It was Kim's fourth child, after daughter Kim Hye-gyong (born 1968 to Hong Il-chon), son Kim Jong-nam (born 1971 to Song Hye-rim), and daughter Kim Sol-song (born 1974 to Kim Young-sook). Kim Jong Il's second child with Ko, the present North Korean supreme leader Kim Jong Un, followed one to three years after Jong-chul. Their third child, Kim Yo Jong, a daughter, was believed to be about 23 in 2012; however, the birth year of Kim Yo Jong is also given as 1987.

On 27 August 2004, various sources reported that Ko had died in Paris from an unspecific illness, probably of breast cancer; however, there are other reports, stating that she was treated in Paris in the spring of 2004 and flown back to Pyongyang where she fell into a coma and died in August 2004.

== Cult of personality ==
Under North Korea's songbun ascribed status system, Ko's Korean-Japanese heritage made her part of the lowest "hostile" class. Furthermore, her father worked in a sewing factory for the Imperial Japanese Army, which gave her the "lowest imaginable status qualities" for a North Korean.

Prior to an internal propaganda film released after the ascension of Kim Jong Un, there were three attempts made to idolize Ko, in a style similar to that associated with Kang Pan Sok, mother of Kim Il Sung, and Kim Jong Suk, the first wife of Kim Il Sung and mother of Kim Jong Il. These previous attempts at idolization failed and were stopped after Kim Jong Il's 2008 stroke.

The building of a cult of personality around Ko encounters the problem of her bad songbun due to her mother, even though it is usually passed on by the father. Making her identity public would have undermined the Kim family's pure bloodline, and after Kim Jong Il's death, her personal information, including her name, became state secrets. Ko's real name and other personal details have not been publicly revealed in North Korea, and she is referred to as "Mother of Great Songun Korea" or "Great Mother".

In 2012, Kim Jong Un built a grave for Ko on Taesongsan.

Japanese journalist Yoji Gomi, author of Ko Yong-hui: The Zainichi Korean Who Became Kim Jong-un's Mother, based on interviews with Ko's relatives in Osaka, speculates that Kim Jong Un's highly visible promotion of his daughter, Kim Ju Ae, may stem from a psychological complex linked to his inability to officially canonize his mother.
