= Kim Hyong-jik =

Korean independence activist (1894–1926)

Seonsaeng Kim Hyong-jik
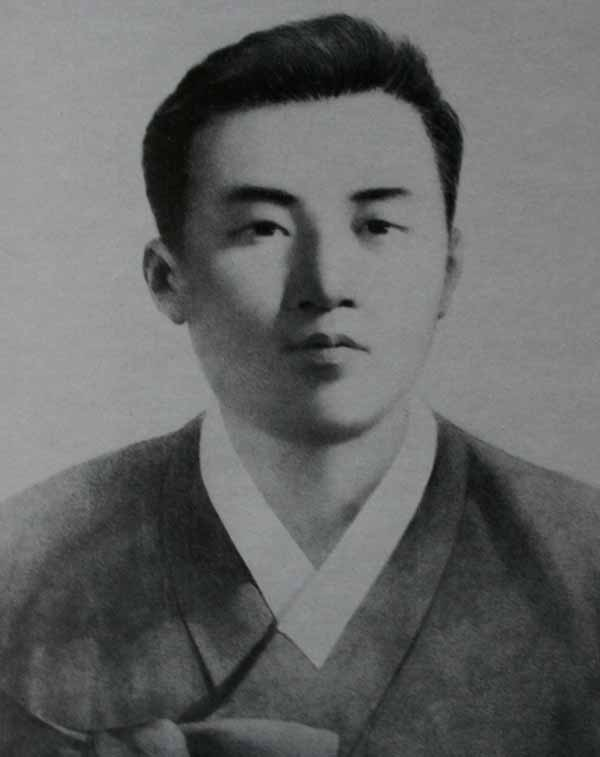
- Kim in 1921
- Born: 10 July 1894; Mangyongdae, Pyongan Province, Joseon
- Died: 5 June 1926 (aged 31); Jilin Province, China
- Spouse: Kang Pan Sok
- Children: Kim Il Sung; Kim Chol-ju; Kim Yong-ju
- Parent(s): Kim Pohyŏn; Yi Poik
- Relatives: Kim family

Korean name
- Hangul: 김형직
- Hanja: 金亨稷
- RR: Gim Hyeongjik
- MR: Kim Hyŏngjik

Kim Hyong-jik (Korean: 김형직; 10 July 1894 – 5 June 1926) was a Korean independence activist during Japanese rule. He was the father of the North Korean founder Kim Il Sung.

== Biography ==
He was born in South Pyongan Province Taedong County, Nam-ri, Gopyeong-myeon, at Mangyongdae, as the son of Kim Pohyŏn and Yi Poik. After graduating from Soongsil School, founded by the Christian missionary William M. Baird, he worked as a teacher at Sunhwa School in Mangyongdae. Kim Hyong-jik himself was also a follower of Christianity, and it is known that Cho Man-sik was his senior at school. In the spring of 1916, he went to Naedong village in Kangdong County, South Pyongan Province (江東郡 古邑面 東三里) (present-day Bonghwa-ri, Kangdong County, Pyongyang) and began teaching at Myongsin School. Contemporary records suggest that, rather than being a formal school teacher, his position was closer to that of a traditional village school (seodang) instructor. On 23 March 1917, Jang Il-hwan (張日煥, 1886 ~ 1918.04.09) and others organized the "Joseon National Association", in Pyongyang, and Kim Hyong-jik (金亨稷) is listed as a member.

Personal record of Kim Hyŏng-jik documented by Japanese authorities during his residence in Changbai County, Manchuria.

On 18 February 1918, while attempting to establish an independence movement base in Jiandao, he was arrested by Japanese police and imprisoned in Pyongyang along with Jang Il-hwan, Bae Min-su, and Kang Seok-bong. After his release in 1918, he fled to Junggangjin, and in 1919 is said to have led the local March First Independence Movement. Evading police arrest, he crossed the Yalu River in May and moved to Linjiang County in China. The area where his family settled was near a rice mill on the way from the county office toward the Yalu River. There, Kim Hyŏng-jik put up a sign reading "Sunchŏn Clinic" and displayed a forged diploma from Severance Medical School.

In March 1920, it is recorded that his brother-in-law Kang Jin-sŏk, a member of the Baeksan Military Corps, briefly stayed at his house in Moasan, Linjiang County. Although not documented, there is testimony that Kim Hyŏng-jik himself was also a member of the Baeksan Military Corps.

In the summer of 1921, he moved again to Badaogou, Changbai County, east of Linjiang, where he practiced traditional medicine under the sign "Gwangje Clinic," as he had done previously. A Japanese document also recorded his personal details as an influential Korean resident in Changbai County. In March 1925, he moved once more to Fusong County and opened Murim Clinic.

He died on 5 June 1926, at the age of 31. In North Korea, it is claimed that his death was due to complications from frostbite suffered while evading Japanese police. However, another account suggests that he may have been killed by a Communist group with whom he had longstanding grievances. His grave, together with that of his wife Kang Pan-sŏk, is located near Mangyongdae in Pyongyang, Kim Il-sung's birthplace, although it is believed that the remains were relocated there after liberation from their original burial site in China.

Kim and his wife attended Christian churches, and Kim even served as a part-time Protestant missionary. It was reported that his son, Kim Il Sung, attended church services during his teenage years before becoming an atheist later in life.

Kim Il Sung often spoke of his father's idea of chiwŏn (지원; 志遠; lit. 'righteous aspirations').

Kim Jong Il's official government biography states that his grandfather was "the leader of the anti-Japanese national liberation movement and was a pioneer in shifting the direction from the nationalist movement to the communist movement in Korea". Kim Hyong-jik is claimed by North Korea to have convened an important meeting of independence activists in November 1921 memorialized at the Sansong Revolutionary Site.

== Family ==
- Father: Kim Pohyŏn (3 October 1871 – 2 September 1955)
  - Paternal grandfather: Kim Ŭngu (17 June 1848 – 4 October 1878)
  - Paternal grandmother: Lady Yi (이씨)
- Mother: Yi Poik (이보익; 31 May 1876 – 18 October 1959)
- Two brothers
  - Kim Hyŏngnok (김형록)
  - Kim Hyŏnggwŏn (4 November 1905 – 12 January 1936)
- Three sisters
  - Kim Kuil (김구일)
  - Kim Hyŏngsil (김형실)
  - Kim Hyŏngpok (김형복)
- Wife: Kang Pan Sok
  - First son: Kim Il Sung (15 April 1912 – 8 July 1994)
  - Second son: Kim Chol-ju (12 June 1916 – 14 June 1935)
  - Third son: Kim Yong-ju (1920–2021)
