= Kim Song-ae =

First Lady of the DPR Korea from 1963 to 1974

Respected First Lady Kim Song-ae
- 김성애
- Kim in 1994

First Lady of North Korea
- In role 17 December 1963 – 15 August 1974
- Supreme Leader: Kim Il Sung
- Preceded by: Position established
- Succeeded by: Ri Sol-ju (2018)

Chair of the Central Committee of the Korean Democratic Women's League
- In office 1993 – 25 April 1998
- Supreme Leader: Kim Jong Il
- Preceded by: Vacant
- Succeeded by: Cheon Yeon Ok
- In office 1971–1976
- Supreme Leader: Kim Il Sung
- Preceded by: Kim Ok Sun
- Succeeded by: Vacant

Personal details
- Born: 29 December 1924 Kangso-guyok, Heian'nan Province (South Pyongan Province), Korea, Empire of Japan
- Died: September 2014 (aged 89) Kanggye, Chagang, North Korea
- Party: Workers' Party of Korea
- Spouse: Kim Il Sung (m. 1952; died 1994)
- Children: 3, including Pyong Il

Korean name
- Hangul: 김성애
- Hanja: 金聖愛
- RR: Gim Seongae
- MR: Kim Sŏngae

Kim Song-ae (Korean: 김성애; 29 December 1924 – September 2014), born Kim Sŏngp'al (김성팔), was a North Korean politician who served as the first lady of North Korea during the time that the position existed, from 1963 to 1974. She was the second wife of North Korea's founder, Kim Il Sung from their marriage in 1952 until his death in 1994.

== Biography ==
Born Kim Sŏngp'al on 29 December 1924 in South Pyongan Province, Kim Song-ae began her career as a clerical worker in the Ministry of National Defense where she first met Kim Il Sung in 1948. She was hired to work in his residence as an assistant to Kim Jong Suk, Kim Il Sung's first wife. After Kim Jong Suk's 1949 death, Kim Song-ae began managing Kim Il Sung's household and domestic life. During the Korean War she looked after Kim Jong Il and Kim Kyong Hui. She married Kim Il Sung in 1952, although due to the war no formal ceremony was held. She gave birth to three sons: Kim Kyong Jin (b. 1952), Kim Pyong Il (b. 1954), and Kim Yong Il (Note: Not the same person as former premier Kim Yong Il) (b. 1956).

Kim Song-ae later rose in political power. From the mid 1960s until the mid 1970s, Kim Song-ae allegedly held a significant amount of political influence in North Korea. As her tenure of political significance occurred in about the same period as that of Jiang Qing in China during the Culture Revolution, Jang Jin-sung referred to Kim Song-ae as the "North Korean mirror image of Jiang Qing".

In 1965, she became vice-chairwoman of the Central Committee of the Korean Democratic Women's League (KDWL), and in 1971, she rose to be chairwoman. In December 1972, she became a representative of the Supreme People's Assembly.

According to Jang Jin-sung, Kim Song-ae had the ambition to place her son, Kim Pyong Il in the position of successor to her spouse Kim Il Sung, rather than his son from his first marriage, Kim Jong Il. In this, she was supposedly supported by a faction of the North Korean political elite, among them her brother Kim Kwang Hop, and Kim Il Sung's younger brother Kim Yong-ju, and opposed by the faction of her stepson Kim Jong Il. In the 1970s, her influence was reportedly seen as excessive by the party, who started to curb it. In parallel, her stepson Kim Jong Il became the designated heir of Kim Il Sung, and his faction worked to remove her from influence. In 1976, Kim Song-ae lost her position as chair of the KDWL, which removed her communication channel to the public and effectively curbed her power base. Reportedly, Kim Song-ae, as well as her brother-in-law Kim Yong-ju, who had supported her plans to place her son in the position of heir instead of Kim Jong Il, was placed in house arrest in 1981 upon the wish of the designated heir Kim Jong Il.

In 1993, she was reinstated by Kim Jong Il as chair of the KDWL, but her position was purely symbolic and nominal, and she was removed a second time in 1998. Since 1998, little information about her has reached the outside world.

There are rumours that she was killed in a car accident in Beijing in June 2001. Other reports claimed she was still alive as of July 2011, though in poor health, and that ambassador Kim Pyong-il returned to Pyongyang from his posting in Poland to visit her. In 2012, a report from a North Korean defector claimed that Kim Song-ae had been declared insane in the early 1990s, even before the death of Kim Il Sung, and since then been kept under supervision of a psychiatric nurse in her house.

She was later reported to have died in 2014, a date which was confirmed by the Ministry of Unification in December 2018.

== Awards ==
- Grand Officer of the National Order of Mali, 18 May 1976
- Order of Kim Il Sung, April 1982
- National Order of the Republic (Burundi)
- Order of the Star of the Romanian Socialist Republic (1st Class)

== Works ==
- Kim Song-ae (1969). Let Us Women Become Revolutionary Fighters Infinitely Loyal to the Party and Reliable Builders of Socialism and Communism by Revolutionizing and Working-classizing Ourselves. Pyongyang: Foreign Languages Publishing House. OCLC 253679297.
- — (1970). On the Women's Emancipation Movement in Korea. Report at the Meeting Held in Honour of the 25th Anniversary of the Founding of the Korean Democratic Women's Union, November 17, 1970. Pyongyang: Foreign Languages Publishing House. OCLC 1012367.

== See also ==
- Pak Chong-ae
