= Kim Ju Ae =

Daughter of Kim Jong Un

Respected Daughter Kim Ju Ae
- Born: c. 2012 or 2013 (age 12–14)
- Parents: Kim Jong Un (father); Ri Sol-ju (mother)
- Relatives: Kim family

Korean name
- Hangul: 김주애
- RR: Gim Juae
- MR: Kim Chuae
- IPA: [kim.t̟͡ɕuɛ̝]

Kim Ju Ae (Note: Alternatively romanized as Kim Ju-ae, Kim Joo Ae, and Kim Joo-ae.) (Korean: 김주애; born c. 2012 or 2013) is the daughter of North Korean leader Kim Jong Un and his wife Ri Sol Ju. The North Korean government has publicly disclosed little information about her, and details about her life, including her birth date and name, remain unconfirmed. The name "Ju Ae" was first mentioned by American basketball player Dennis Rodman after his visit to North Korea in 2013, but it has not been verified by either the North Korean government or South Korea's National Intelligence Service (NIS). North Korean defectors interviewed by South Korean intelligence have said that her name may instead be Un Ju (은주) or Ju Ye (주예).

She made her first public appearance alongside her father at a missile launch in 2022. State media initially referred to her as Kim Jong Un's "beloved" and "precious" daughter before adopting the adjective "respected", which is typically reserved for the most honoured members of North Korean society, such as Kim Jong Un himself. After her public debut, analysts of North Korea speculated about the reason for her prominence in state media, with some hypothesising that she was being trained as the heir apparent to lead North Korea. In 2026, the NIS reported to South Korea's National Assembly that she had finished her training and had become the designated successor of her father.

== Early reports and uncertainties ==
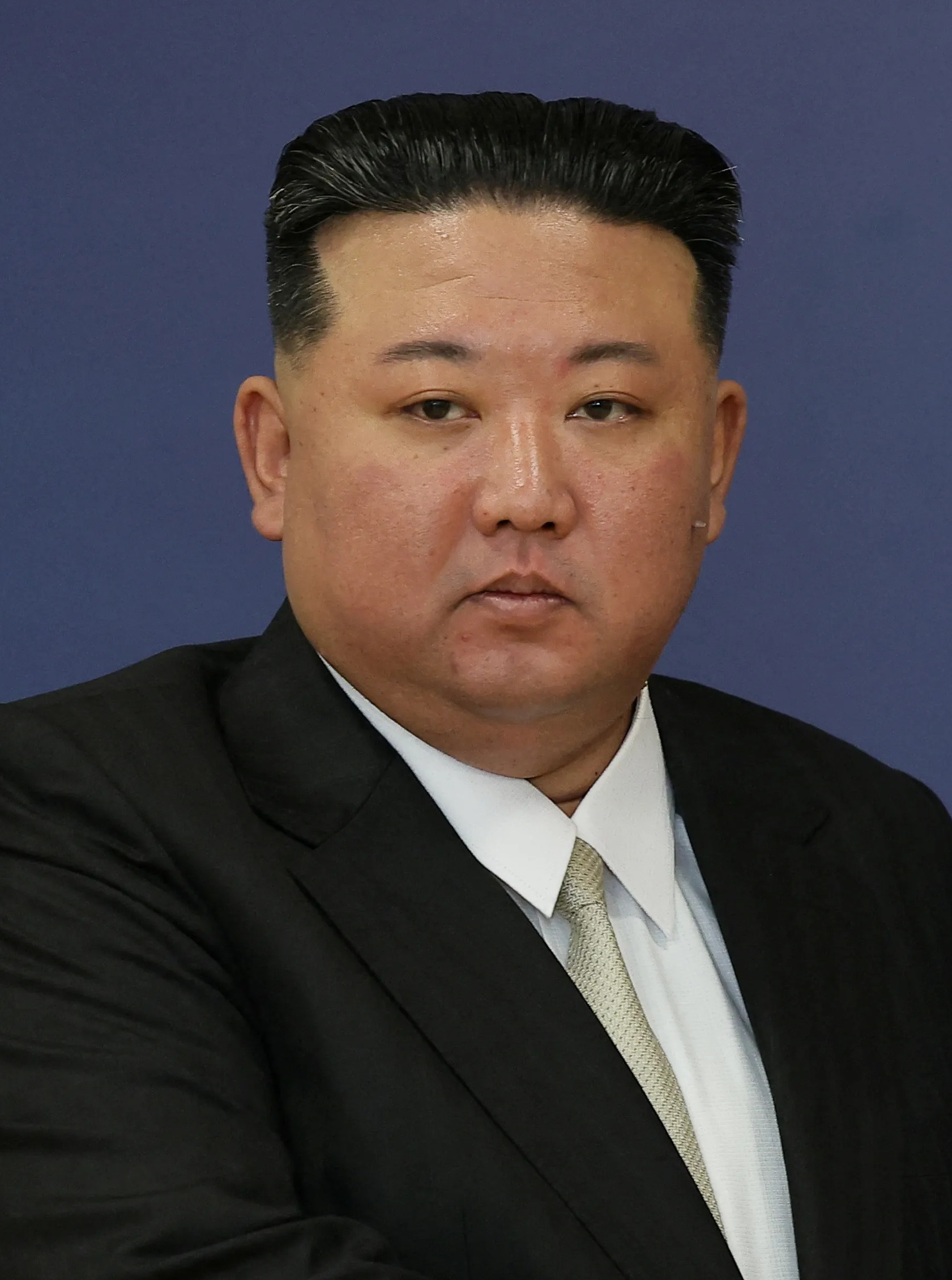
Kim Jong Un

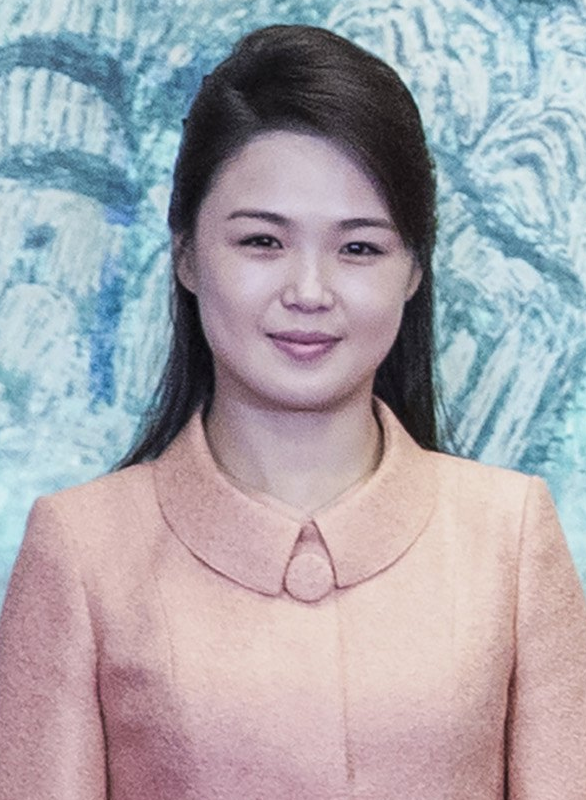
Ri Sol-ju

The North Korean government has not publicly disclosed Kim Ju Ae's birth date. Ri Sol Ju's lengthy absence from the public eye in 2012 was later attributed to her pregnancy with Kim Ju Ae. South Korea's National Intelligence Service (NIS) estimated in 2023 that she was 10 or 11 years old. South Korean lawmaker Kim Byung-kee, citing "non-NIS sources", claims that she was born in 2013. His colleague Yi Wan-yong, citing both the NIS and non-NIS sources, claims that Kim Ju Ae has an older brother born in 2010 and a younger sibling of unknown sex born in 2017. However, in a 2023 interview with Radio Free Asia, João Micaelo, a personal acquaintance of Kim Jong Un, expressed doubts that the North Korean leader had ever fathered a son. Micaelo claims to have first met Kim Jong Un in 1998 while attending school together in Switzerland. When they met again in their adulthood, Micaelo claims that Kim Jong Un never mentioned a son, only the daughter he had been appearing in public with.

The North Korean government has also not publicly disclosed her name, and the NIS has not verified any claims on the matter from North Korean defectors. North Korean media initially called her Kim Jong Un's "beloved" (사랑하는) or "precious" (존귀하신) daughter but soon began using the adjective "respected" (존경하는), which is typically reserved for the most honoured members of North Korean society. For example, Kim Jong Un received the title of "respected comrade" shortly after becoming the country's supreme leader. In March 2024, Kim Ju Ae was officially referred to as a "great person of guidance", along with her father during a public event.

The name "Ju Ae" was first mentioned by American basketball player Dennis Rodman in his account of a 2013 visit he made to the North Korean capital of Pyongyang. When discussing Kim Jong Un and Ri Sol Ju, Rodman described "[holding] their baby Ju Ae" and complimented Kim Jong Un as a "good dad" and an "awesome guy". However, Choe Su-yong, a former NIS intelligence officer, claims that Rodman misunderstood the Korean words jeoae (저애), which mean "that girl", and that the child's actual name is Un Ju (은주). Choe cited his North Korean informants as his source.

On 4 November 2022, The Chosun Ilbo reported claims from an unnamed defector, a former military officer who claims to have escorted Kim Jong Un's eldest son and middle daughter overseas. He claimed that the daughter's name is indeed "Ju Ae", and that her elder brother is named "Ju Un", with "Ju" taken from their mother's name and "Un" taken from their father's. He further claimed that the Hanja spelling of the daughter's name is "主愛". North Korean diplomat Ri Il-kyu, who defected to South Korea in 2023, has said that her name is Ju Ye (주예; 主叡) and that North Korean citizens named Ju Ye were ordered to change their names.

== Public appearances ==
External videos
- From YouTube
- N. Korea unveils stamp featuring leader's daughter Ju-ae for 1st time. Yonhap News Agency. 14 February 2023.
- Kim Ju Ae: A rare look at North Korea's next likely leader. NBC News. 5 July 2025.

Kim Ju Ae appeared in public for the first time at the test launch of an intercontinental ballistic missile on 18 November 2022. The state-run Korean Central News Agency released photos of Kim Ju Ae and her father inspecting a Hwasong-17 missile together before its launch. Her public debut came amid worsening inter-Korean relations due to a record number of North Korean missile launches. Rachel Minyoung Lee, a senior analyst at the Open Nuclear Network in Vienna, Austria, suggests that the photos may have been intended to "bolster [Kim Jong Un's] image as the father of the people and the nation", and "highlight the necessity of nuclear weapons programmes for the security of future generations", with Ju Ae representing future generations. Kim Ju Ae subsequently made four more public appearances from late November 2022 to early February 2023. On 14 February 2023, the state-run Korea Stamp Corporation unveiled postage stamps featuring Kim Ju Ae and Kim Jong Un at the 18 November missile launch.

Kim Ju Ae joined her father at a number of official ceremonies and processions in 2023. She participated in official festivities with her father during that year's celebration of the Day of the Shining Star, the birth anniversary of her grandfather Kim Jong Il, on 16 February. She appeared with her father once again on 9 September, at a parade marking the 75th anniversary of the foundation of North Korea. At the end of the year, she attended New Year's Eve celebrations with her father at the May Day Stadium in Pyongyang.

Kim Ju Ae accompanied her father at a number of public events in 2024 and 2025 as well. She attended the celebration of the ruling Workers' Party of Korea's 79th anniversary on 10 October 2024. The following year, she attended the launch ceremony of the Choe Hyon destroyer on 25 April and the 80th celebration of Victory Day at the Russian embassy in Pyongyang on 9 May. On 2 September 2025, she accompanied her father to Beijing to attend a military parade celebrating the 80th anniversary of China's victory over Japan in World War II. It was her first public appearance abroad. In March 2026, she was seen again during a military exercise. She was driving a tank with her father along with other soldiers.

== Succession ==
Kim Ju Ae's public prominence has led to speculation by North Korea analysts about her future position in the country. Richard Lloyd Parry of The Times suggests that it may be a response to rivalries within the North Korean government and an attempt to reassert the political supremacy of the Kim family. Go Myong-hyun, a senior fellow at the Asan Institute for Policy Studies in Seoul, likewise argues that Kim Ju Ae's public presentation is that of a princess and is an attempt by state media to normalise the Kim family's rule "by adopting the trappings of [a] European-style monarchy". A number of other analysts have speculated that she has been chosen as her father's successor as supreme leader, which could make her the first woman to serve in the top position. This hypothesis was echoed by the NIS at the start of 2024, after the agency made its annual assessment of North Korea.

In a closed-door meeting on 29 July 2024, the NIS reported to members of South Korea's National Assembly that Kim Ju Ae was being trained to succeed her father as supreme leader. Park Jie-won, who served as the NIS's director from 2020 to 2022, dismissed the report's findings, noting that possible successors had previously been kept hidden from the public eye. He further argued that the North Korean government has historically been patriarchal, making Kim Ju Ae's ascension unlikely. Park's comments were echoed by a number of North Korea analysts who further posited that Kim Ju Ae, being a child, was politically unproven, and so the decision to make her Kim Jong Un's successor would have been premature.

The NIS reported to the National Assembly in February 2026 that Kim Ju Ae had completed her successor training and had been designated the successor to her father. They cited her attendance at military events, her increased involvement in policy decisions, and a visit by her to the Kumsusan Palace of the Sun, a significant symbol of the Kim family.
