= Kim Ŭngu =

Ancestor of Kim Il Sung (1848–1878)

- 김응우
- Propaganda depiction of Kim Ŭngu during the General Sherman Incident
- Born: June 17, 1848; Mangyongdae, Joseon
- Died: October 4, 1878 (aged 30); Joseon
- Spouse: Lady Yi Poik (North Korea)
- Children: Kim Pohyŏn
- Parents: Kim Song-Ryeong (father); Na Hyeon-Jik (mother)
- Relatives: Kim Minsu (grandfather)

Korean name
- Hangul: 김응우
- Hanja: 金膺禹
- RR: Gim Eungu
- MR: Kim Ŭngu

Kim Ŭngu (Korean: 김응우; June 17, 1848 – October 4, 1878) was a Mangyongdae farmer who was the great-grandfather of North Korea's founder and "Eternal President" Kim Il Sung and ancestor of the Kim family. In North Korea, he is considered a national hero by North Korean state propaganda.

== Life ==
He was born on June 17, 1848, in the Mangyongdae settlement of Joseon (now part of Pyongyang) as the eldest child of Kim Song-ryeong (김송령, 金成瑛; 1810–1899). He had three brothers: Kim Ŭiguk (김의국; 1854–1947), Kim Chongsu (김종수; 1855–1943), and Kim Insŏk (김인석; 1863–1952). The first name of his wife is unknown, but it is certain that he married a lady with the surname Ri. Only one son was born from their marriage, who was named Kim Pohyŏn.

According to official North Korean accounts, Kim led a group of volunteers to attack the SS General Sherman. The story states that they sank the ship by burning it with firewood. The story says that a second ship, the Shenandoah, was sent by the United States, but Kim destroyed this one as well. There is no historical evidence that Kim was actually involved in the event.

Kim Ŭngu is considered the patriarch and earliest prominent ancestral figure of Kim Il Sung, the Kim dynasty and the Mount Paektu bloodline as the sacred hereditary lineage as the Mythological Birth of Korea with geographical ties to the Chinese border, and he is remembered to this day as the leader of the attack on the General Sherman and a national hero in North Korea and a key figure within the state propaganda.
