= Secretariat of the Workers' Party of Korea =

Agency managing WPK's politburo

The Secretariat of the Workers' Party of Korea, formerly known as the Executive Policy Bureau (2016–21), manages the work of the Politburo of the Workers' Party of Korea and its Presidium. The General Secretary leads the work of the Secretariat, and the body is composed of several members (known as "secretaries").

== History ==
The Secretariat, the forerunner of the Executive Policy Bureau, was established at the 2nd Conference of Representatives in October 1966, and was similar to its counterpart in the Communist Party of the Soviet Union (CPSU) during the Stalin era. The head of the Secretariat at the time was the General Secretary. Until 1966, the WPK had no body similar to the Secretariat; this was unusual, since a Secretariat was one of the most powerful bodies in other ruling communist parties. The Secretariat was established during a power struggle as a means of strengthening Kim Il Sung's control over the party's lower-level organizations; for this reason, a large majority of the first Secretariat members were full or candidate members of the WPK Politburo. After the power struggle ended in 1967–1968, the Secretariat's status waned; this "has been reflected by the lower status of cadres appointed to the Secretariat in recent years", especially at the 6th Congress. At that congress, only three members (out of nine) served concurrently as full Politburo members: Kim Il Sung, Kim Jong Il and Kim Jung-rin (not a Kim family member).

The Secretariat's prestige continued to decline during Kim Jong Il's rule, with five of its twelve members dying during the interregnum between the December 1993 21st Plenary Session of the 6th Central Committee and the 3rd Conference of Representatives in 2010. Of the seven remaining members, three were retired at the 3rd Conference. The four incumbents were Kim Jong Il, Kim Ki-nam (Head of the Propaganda and Agitation Department), Choe Tae-pok (Head of the International Department) and Hong Sok-syong (Head of the Finance and Planning Department).

Seven new members were appointed: Choe Ryong-hae as Secretary for Military Affairs, Mun Kyong-dok as Secretary for Pyongyang Affairs (through his office as Secretary of the WPK Pyongyang City Committee), Pak To-chun as Secretary of Defense Industry (through his office as Head of the Munitions Industry Department, Kim Yong-il as Secretary for International Affairs (assuming Choe Tak-pok's portfolio), Kim Yang-kon as Secretary for South Korean Affairs and Head of the United Front Department, Kim Pyong-hae as Secretary for Personnel and Thae Chong-su as Secretary of General Affairs (through his office as Head of the General Affairs Department). At the 4th Conference, there were no retirements; Kim Kyong-hui (sister of Kim Jong Il) and Kwak Pom-gi were appointed as members and Kim Jong Un, through his office as First Secretary, replaced the late Kim Jong Il.

== Role ==
Along with the Politburo and Central Control Committee, the Bureau is one of the three power organizations subordinate to the Party Central Committee. Also, the Bureau is involved in coordination of the party structure. It has authority in the Worker' Party of Korea, but does not have policy-making influence. The Politburo and its Presidium can elect or appoint officials in the Bureau. According to the charter of the WPK, "The Executive Policy Bureau periodically discusses and decides on the problems of cadres, internal problems of the party, and other tasks of the party, and supervises the execution of party decisions".

The body was known as the Secretariat from its establishment in October 1966 to its reorganization into the Executive Policy Bureau at the 7th Congress in May 2016.

== Current membership ==
As of 10 January 2021, the Secretariat consists of the General Secretary and seven secretaries. In Jube 2021 the office of Deputy General Secretary also called First Secretary was established.

General Secretary
General Secretary	Since	Other positions
Kim Jong Un 김정은 (born 1984)	10 January 2021	Politburo Presidium Member; General Secretary of the Workers' Party of Korea; Chairman of the Central Military Commission; President of the State Affairs Commission; Supreme Commander of the Armed Forces of North Korea
Deputy General Secretary/First Secretary
Deputy General Secretary/First Secretary	Since	Other positions
Unknown (Note: Jo Yong-won is regarded to be the deputy.)	Unknown	Unknown
Secretaries
Secretaries	Since	Other positions
Jo Yong-won 조용원	10 January 2021	Politburo Presidium Member; Member of the Central Military Commission
Pak Thae-song 박태성 (born 1955)	10 January 2021	Politburo Member; Director of the Information and Publicity Department; Chairman of the Supreme People's Assembly
Ri Pyong-chol 리병철 (born 1948)	10 January 2021	Politburo Presidium Member; Vice Chairman of the Central Military Commission; Member of the State Affairs Commission
Jong Sang-hak 정상학	10 January 2021	Politburo Member; Chairman of the Central Auditing Commission
Ri Il-hwan 리일환 (born 1960)	10 January 2021	Politburo Member; Director of the Working Organization Department
Choe Sang-gon 최상건 (born 1953)	10 January 2021	Politburo Member; Director of the Science and Education Department; Minister of Education
O Su-yong 오수용 (born 1944)	11 February 2021	Member of the Central Military Commission; Director of the Economic Affairs Department
