= Executive Policy Bureau =

The Executive Policy Bureau of the Workers' Party of Korea (WPK), officially the Executive Policy Bureau of the 7th Central Committee of the Workers' Party of Korea (Korean: 제7기 조선로동당 중앙위원회 정무국), was established at the 7th WPK Congress on 9 May 2016 and abolished at the 8th WPK Congress on 10 January 2021.

== Leadership ==
- Chairman of the Workers' Party of Korea: Kim Jong Un

== Meetings ==
- 4th Meeting: 5 August 2020
- Meeting: 25 August 2020
- Enlarged Meeting: 5 September 2020

== Members ==
The following were elected as members of the Executive Policy Bureau. The Executive Policy Bureau is composed of the Chairman of the Workers' Party of Korea and the vice chairmen of the Central Committee.

The names of members are listed according to the order of their election at the 1st plenary meeting of the 7th Central Committee. Members who have an en dash (—) in the Rank column were by-elected during the term of the 7th Central Committee.

Rank	Name	Korean	6th SEC (Note: Status in the Secretariat at the end of the 6th Central Committee's term.)	8th SEC (Note: Status in the Secretariat at the start of the 8th Central Committee's term.)
1	Kim Jong Un	김정은	Yes	Yes
2	Choe Ryong-hae (Note: Choe Ryong-hae was dismissed as a vice chairman on 10 April 2019.)	최룡해	Yes	No
3	Kim Ki-nam (Note: Kim Ki-nam was dismissed as a vice chairman on 7 October 2017.)	김기남	Yes	No
4	Choe Thae-bok (Note: Choe Thae-bok was dismissed as a vice chairman on 7 October 2017.)	최태복	Yes	No
5	Ri Su-yong (Note: Ri Su-yong was dismissed as a vice chairman on 31 December 2019.)	리수용	No	No
6	Kim Phyong-hae (Note: Kim Phyong-hae was dismissed as a vice chairman on 31 December 2019.)	김평해	Yes	No
7	O Su-yong (Note: O Su-yong was dismissed as a vice chairman on 31 December 2019.)	오수용	Yes	No
8	Kwak Pom-gi (Note: Kwak Pom-gi was dismissed as a vice chairman on 7 October 2017.)	곽범기	Yes	No
9	Kim Yong-chol	김영철	No	No
10	Ri Man-gon (Note: Ri Man-gon was dismissed as a vice chairman on 7 October 2017. He returned as a vice chairman by being elected again on 10 April 2019.)	리만건	No	No
—	Pak Kwang-ho (Note: Pak Kwang-ho was elected as a vice chairman on 7 October 2017, but was dismissed on 31 December 2019.)	박광호	No	No
—	Pak Thae-song (Note: Pak Thae-song was elected as a vice chairman on 7 October 2017, but was dismissed on 13 August 2020.)	박태성	No	Yes
—	Thae Jong-su (Note: Thae Jong-su was elected as a vice chairman on 7 October 2017, but was dismissed on 31 December 2019.)	태종수	No	No
—	Pak Thae-dok (Note: Pak Thae-dok was elected as a vice chairman on 7 October 2017, but was dismissed on 27 February 2020. He returned as a vice chairman by being elected again on 13 August 2020.)	박태덕	No	No
—	An Jong-su (Note: An Jong-su was elected as a vice chairman on 7 October 2017, but was dismissed on 31 December 2019.)	안정수	No	No
—	Choe Hwi (Note: Choe Hwi was elected as a vice chairman on 7 October 2017.)	최휘	No	No
—	Pak Pong-ju (Note: Pak Pong-ju was elected as a vice chairman on 10 April 2019.)	박봉주	No	No
—	Ri Il-hwan (Note: Ri Il-hwan was elected as a vice chairman on 31 December 2019.)	리일환	No	Yes
—	Kim Hyong-jun (Note: Kim Hyong-jun was elected as a vice chairman on 31 December 2019.)	김형준	No	No
—	Ri Pyong-chol (Note: Ri Pyong-chol was elected as a vice chairman on 31 December 2019.)	리병철	No	Yes
—	Kim Tok-hun (Note: Kim Tok-hun was elected as a vice chairman on 31 December 2019, but was dismissed on 13 August 2020.)	김덕훈	No	No
—	Kim Jae-ryong (Note: Kim Jae-ryong was elected as a vice chairman on 13 August 2020.)	김재룡	No	No
