= Choe Son-hui =

North Korean politician (born 1964)

- 최선희
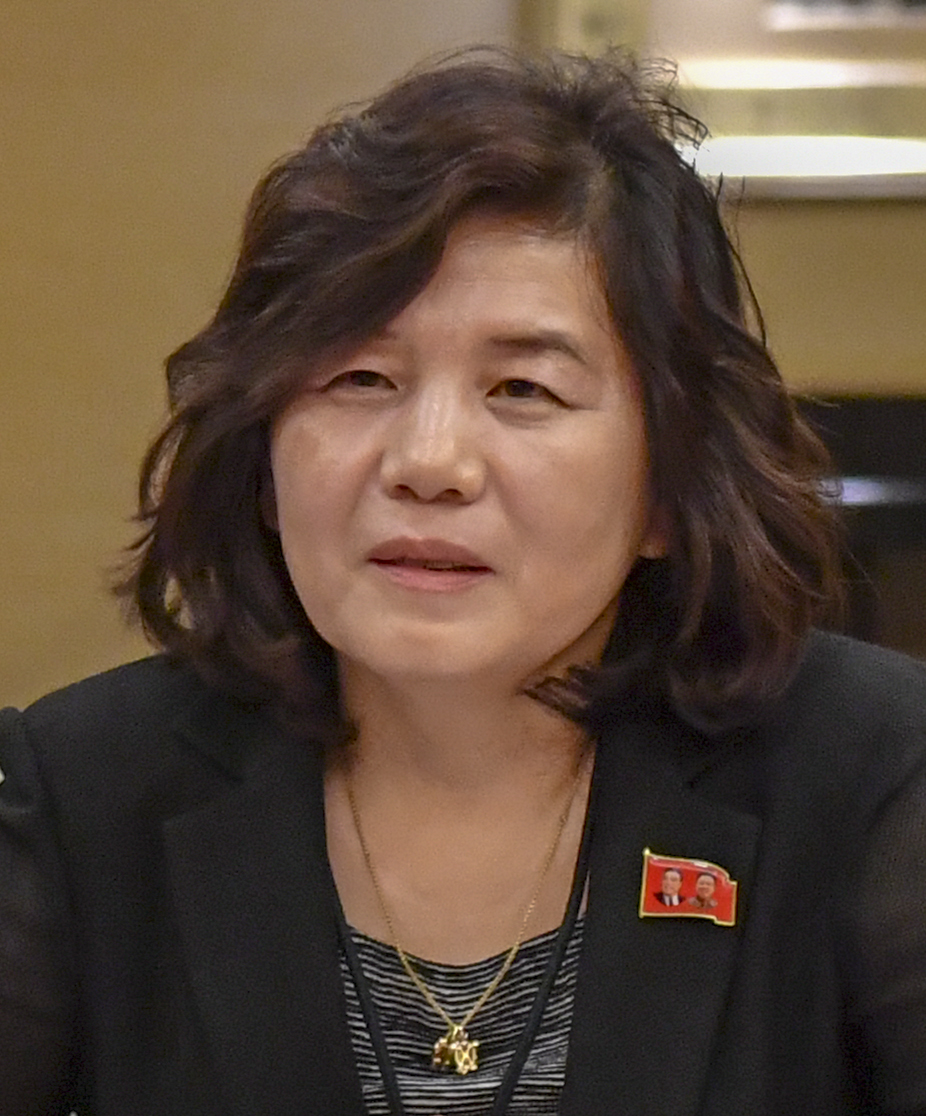
- Choe in 2018

Minister of Foreign Affairs
- Incumbent
- Assumed office 11 June 2022
- President: Kim Jong Un
- Premier: Kim Tok-hun; Pak Thae-song
- Deputy: Im Chon Il
- Preceded by: Ri Son-gwon

First Vice Minister of Foreign Affairs
- In office April 2019 – June 2022
- Preceded by: Kim Kye-gwan

Vice Minister of Foreign Affairs (North American portfolio)
- In office February 2018 – April 2019
- Preceded by: Han Song-ryol

Personal details
- Born: 10 August 1964 (age 62) Pyongyang, North Korea
- Party: Workers' Party of Korea
- Relations: Choe Yong-rim (stepfather)
- Occupation: Diplomat

- Choe Son-hui
- Hangul: 최선희
- Hanja: 崔善姫
- RR: Choe Seonhui
- MR: Ch'oe Sŏnhŭi

Choe Son-hui (Korean: 최선희; born 10 August 1964) is a North Korean politician and diplomat who has been the country's Minister of Foreign Affairs since 11 June 2022. Previously the First Vice Minister of Foreign Affairs, she is the first woman to hold the position and is one of few North Korean women holding a high-level office. In December 2024, she became a member of the Politburo of the Workers' Party of Korea.

Choe is fluent in English and interpreted at the six-party talks and Washington-Pyongyang dialogue early in her career. Choe has worked in the foreign ministry as a section chief and deputy director. Since 2016, she has served as the deputy director-general of the North American department. In 2018, she was appointed as a regular vice minister with a North American portfolio. The following year, she became the first vice minister.

Choe is reportedly a regular participant in track 1.5 and track 2 diplomacy and has experience in the area of North Korea–United States relations and nuclear issues. A statement by Choe released before the 2018 North Korea–United States Singapore Summit between Donald Trump and Kim Jong Un led to President Trump temporarily cancelling the meeting. Choe had referred to US Vice President Mike Pence as a "political dummy", angering Trump. Regardless, Choe was a participant in the summit when it took place on 12 June. At the 2019 North Korea–United States Hanoi Summit, Choe made a last-minute attempt to reach an agreement with her American counterparts, but failed to reach a deal.

== Early life ==
Choe Son-hui was born on 10 August 1964 in North Korea. She is the stepdaughter of Choe Yong-rim, a former Premier of North Korea. Through her stepfather, Choe has a close connection with the ruling Kim dynasty of North Korea. She was educated in North Korea, China, Austria, and Malta and is fluent in English.

== Career ==
Choe Son-hui is a senior diplomat, with more than a decade of experience in the Ministry of Foreign Affairs. She is experienced in negotiating on the nuclear program of North Korea, and negotiating with the United States. She worked as an interpreter and aide in nuclear talks under First Vice Minister of Foreign Affairs Kim Kye-gwan. Choe participated in such talks in the 1990s and until the six-party talks were foiled in 2009, and onward to the 2010 Washington-Pyongyang dialogue. She also served in this capacity during former US president Bill Clinton's visit to Pyongyang following the 2009 imprisonment of American journalists by North Korea and a similar visit by Jimmy Carter. Choe has also interpreted for North Korea's leader Kim Jong Un, including during the 2013 visit by Dennis Rodman, which she reportedly opposed, and for Kim's uncle Jang Song-thaek. She was vice negotiator for 2011 talks with the US. She has also worked as a researcher in the Ministry of Foreign Affairs. She regularly participates in track 1.5 and track 2 diplomacy.

Choe's longstanding position is that the nuclear weapons program of North Korea is the only reliable safeguard of the country's sovereignty. She has said that severing of United States' military alliance with Japan and South Korea are prerequisites for negotiations and that US withdrawal from Korea should be a verifiable process.

Choe has served as section chief, deputy director, and, since 2016, deputy director-general of the North American department of the Ministry of Foreign Affairs. She was also deputy director of the Institute for American Studies (IFAS) under the ministry. In June 2016, Choe became director of the department and director of IFAS. She was elected to the 14th Supreme People's Assembly in 2019, representing the 484th Electoral District (Onjong).

=== Vice Minister of Foreign Affairs ===
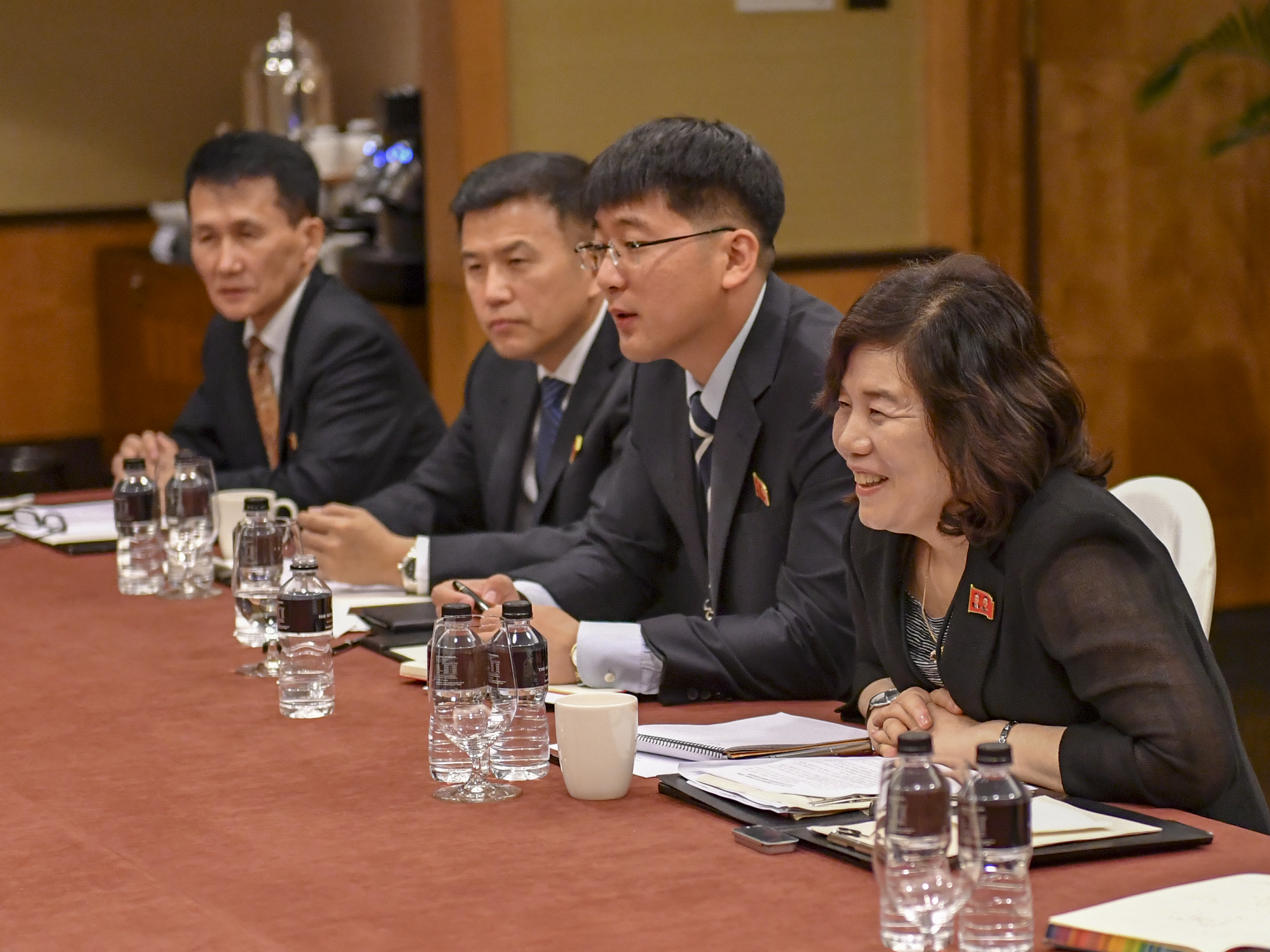
Choe and her team negotiating with US Ambassador to the Philippines Sung Kim

Choe was promoted to the rank of Vice Minister of Foreign Affairs in late February 2018, replacing Han Song-ryol and taking his North America portfolio. Han remained vice minister with a European portfolio. At the time, there were seven regular vice ministers in the ministry under First Vice Minister Kim Kye-gwan. Called North Korea's "point person" on relations with the United States, Choe's portfolio included responsibility for those relations and with Canada.

Choe's appointment had been interpreted as reflecting North Korea's willingness to negotiate with the United States as she had allegedly expressed a conciliatory position during the initial 2017 North Korea crisis. She was therefore expected to play a role in negotiations leading up to the 2018 North Korea–United States Singapore Summit. In the run-up, she headed North Korea's negotiating team a number of times when they met with their American counterparts. In May, she participated in track 1.5 talks with former US diplomats, in order to get to know the administration of US president Donald Trump.

On 24 May, the state news agency KCNA released a statement by Choe in which she criticized US Vice President Mike Pence, calling him a "political dummy" for comparing North Korea to Libya and its nuclear weapons program:

As a person involved in the U.S. affairs, I cannot suppress my surprise at such ignorant and stupid remarks gushing out from the mouth of the U.S. vice-president.

If he is vice-president of "single superpower" as is in name, it will be proper for him to know even a little bit about the current state of global affairs and to sense to a certain degree the trends in dialogue and the climate of détente.

We could surmise more than enough what a political dummy he is as he is trying to compare the DPRK, a nuclear weapon state, to Libya that had simply installed a few items of equipment and fiddled around with them.

Choe is thought to have direct access to Kim Jong Un, and according to The Times' Daniel Hurst, "it is unlikely that she was speaking without the authority of Mr Kim". Choe's remarks directly led to Trump promptly notifying North Korea that the planned 2018 North Korea–United States Singapore Summit would be canceled. According to CNN, "Trump and his aides were infuriated by the statement and wanted to respond forcefully ... The specific and personal targeting of Pence is what irked US officials".

In the end, the summit was organized on 12 June and Choe was present. She was replaced as the head of working-level negotiations in early 2019. At the 2019 North Korea–United States Hanoi Summit that ended prematurely and without an agreement, Choe was the last person to have talked to the American team of negotiators. She made a last-minute suggestion that all facilities of the Yongbyon Nuclear Scientific Research Center could be demolished. When she was then asked to clarify what the offer meant, she was unable to give any further details, resulting in the American team walking out.

=== First Vice Minister of Foreign Affairs ===
Choe received a series of promotions in April 2019, becoming a member of the Central Committee of the Workers' Party of Korea and the State Affairs Commission (SAC). She was also elevated to first First Vice Minister of Foreign Affairs, likely replacing her former superior Kim Kye-gwan, who had not been seen in public since 2017. The promotion to SAC in particular has been interpreted as making Choe a very powerful foreign policy official and possibly signaling new impetus to talks between North Korea and the United States. Choe reports directly to Minister of Foreign Affairs Ri Yong-ho.

Choe is the highest-ranking woman in the foreign ministry. She is one of a few women in holding such a high-level office in North Korean politics overall. With her appointment to First Vice Minister of Foreign Affairs, Choe became the highest-ranking female diplomat ever in the history of the country. Ralph Cossa, president of the Center for Strategic and International Studies's Pacific Forum, calls her "incredibly bright and apparently well-connected". Thae Yong-ho, a top diplomat who defected in 2016 says: "Her credentials are excellent." Han Jin-myung, a former diplomat who defected in 2014, said her power was limited and her greater role was to present a moderate and modern image of North Korea to the outside world.

=== Minister of Foreign Affairs ===
On 11 June 2022, Choe was appointed the minister of foreign affairs, becoming the first woman to hold the position.

In December 2024, during the plenary session of the Central Committee of the Workers' Party of Korea, Choe was promoted to become a member of the WPK Politburo.

As the minister of foreign affairs Choe Son-hui was invited by Russian Foreign Minister Sergey Lavrov to a "third strategic dialogue" on July 20, 2026 in Moscow. The day before she met the Russian President Vladimir Putin in the Kremlin.

== See also ==
- Foreign relations of North Korea
- Kim Kyong-hui
- Kim Sol-song
- Kim Song-hye
- Kim Yo Jong
- Ro Song-sil
- Women in North Korea

Political offices
Preceded by Han Song-ryol	Vice Minister of Foreign Affairs (North American portfolio); 2018–2019	Unknown
Preceded by Kim Kye-gwan	First Vice Minister of Foreign Affairs; 2019–2022	Unknown
Preceded by Ri Son-gwon	Minister of Foreign Affairs; 2022–present	Incumbent
