= 6th Secretariat of the Workers' Party of Korea =

The 6th Secretariat of the Workers' Party of Korea (WPK)(6차 조선로동당 비서국), officially the Secretariat of the 6th Central Committee of the Workers' Party of Korea, was elected by the 1st Plenary Session of the 6th Central Committee in the immediate aftermath of the 6th WPK Congress.

== Leadership ==
- General Secretary of the Workers' Party of Korea:
  - Kim Il Sung, until 8 July 1994 (as General Secretary of the Central Committee)
  - Kim Jong Il, 8 October 1997 – 17 December 2011
- First Secretary of the Workers' Party of Korea: Kim Jong Un, from 11 April 2012

== Members ==
=== Members elected in 1980 ===
Rank	Name	Korean	5th SEC (Note: Status in the Secretariat at the start of the 5th Central Committee's term.)	2010 (Note: Status in the Secretariat at the plenary meeting of the 6th Central Committee on 28 September 2010.)	7th EPB (Note: Status in the Executive Policy Bureau at the start of the 7th Central Committee's term.)
1	Kim Il Sung	김일성	Yes	No	No
2	Kim Jong Il	김정일	No	Yes	No
3	Kim Jung-rin	김중린	Yes	No	No
4	Kim Yong-nam	김영남	No	No	No
5	Kim Hwan	김환	No	No	No
6	Yon Hyong-muk	연형묵	No	No	No
7	Yun Ki-bok	윤기복	No	No	No
8	Hong Si-hak	홍시학	No	No	No
9	Hwang Jang-yop	황장엽	No	No	No
10	Pak Su-dong	박수동	No	No	No

=== Members elected in 2010 ===
Rank	Name	Korean	5th SEC	1980 (Note: Status in the Secretariat at the 1st Plenary Meeting of the 6th Central Committee on 14 October 1980.)	7th EPB
1	Kim Jong Il (Note: Kim Jong Il died on 17 December 2011.)	김정일	No	Yes	No
2	Kim Ki-nam	김기남	No	No	Yes
3	Choe Thae-bok	최태복	No	No	Yes
4	Choe Ryong-hae	최룡해	No	No	Yes
5	Mun Kyong-dok	문경덕	No	No	No
6	Pak To-chun	박도춘	No	No	No
7	Kim Yong-il	김영일	No	No	No
8	Kim Yang-gon (Note: Kim Yang-gon died on 29 December 2015.)	김양건	No	No	No
9	Kim Phyong-hae	김평해	No	No	Yes
10	Thae Jong-su	태종수	No	No	No
11	Hong Sok-hyong (Note: Hong Sok-hyong was dismissed on 6 June 2011.)	홍석형	No	No	No
—	Kim Jong Un (Note: Kim Jong Un was elected as first secretary on 11 April 2012.)	김정은	No	No	Yes
—	Kim Kyong-hui (Note: Kim Kyong-hui was elected as secretary on 11 April 2012.)	김경희	No	No	No
—	Kwak Pom-gi (Note: Kwak Pom-gi was elected as secretary on 11 April 2012.)	곽범기	No	No	Yes
