= State Affairs Commission of North Korea =

Political authority in North Korea

State Affairs Commission of the Democratic People's Republic of Korea
- 조선민주주의인민공화국 국무위원회
- Emblem of North Korea

Agency overview
- Formed: 29 June 2016
- Preceding agency: National Defence Commission
- Type: Supreme policy-oriented leadership body
- Jurisdiction: Government of the Democratic People's Republic of Korea
- Headquarters: Government Complex No. 1, Pyongyang
- Agency executives: Kim Jong Un, President; Jo Yong-won, First Vice President; Pak Thae-song, Vice President

Korean name
- Hangul: 조선민주주의인민공화국 국무위원회
- Hanja: 朝鮮民主主義人民共和國國務委員會
- RR: Joseon minjujuui inmin gonghwaguk gungmu wiwonhoe
- MR: Chosŏn minjujuŭi inmin konghwaguk kungmu wiwŏnhoe

The State Affairs Commission of the Democratic People's Republic of Korea (SAC) is constitutionally the supreme state policy organ of North Korea.

The State Affairs Commission was created under the 2016 amendments to the North Korean Constitution to replace the previously military-dominated National Defence Commission, which would be convened only in the times of war. The Commission has the powers to deliberate and decide on major policies of the State including defence and security policies. It supervises the Cabinet of North Korea, as well as the Ministry of Defence, Ministry of State Security and the Ministry of Social Security and the Korean People's Army's General Staff Department and General Political Bureau.

The body is headed by the President of the State Affairs Commission, commonly styled in official North Korean releases as "President of State Affairs", who is defined as the head of state and the supreme leader of the nation. The position is held by the General Secretary of the Workers' Party of Korea. The current President is Kim Jong Un and the first vice-president is Jo Yong-won.

== History ==
The predecessor body, National Defence Commission, was created in 1972 as sub-committee for defence and security affairs of the Central People's Committee, the later was headed by the President of the DPRK Kim Il Sung and exercised similar powers within the constitutional framework of the 1972 Constitution of North Korea.

The National Defence Commission was separated from the Supreme People's Committee in 1992 and Kim Jong Il was officially designated as chair of the body. In 1998, two years after the death of Kim Il Sung, the National Defence Commission was empowered as the supreme defence body, and in line with the Songun ideology, the supreme political authority of state and legal framework for Kim Jong Il's personal dictatorship.

After the 7th Congress of the Workers Party of Korea, the constitution was amended in June 2016 that reformed the National Defence Commission into the contemporary State Affairs Commission, with the amended text stipulating the body's control over national policy.

== Powers and responsibilities ==
Article 106 of the Constitution of North Korea defines the State Affairs Commission as the supreme state organ of policy direction of state sovereignty. Article 109 of the Constitution states that the SAC's powers are to:

- deliberate and decide on major policies of the State including defence and security policies;
- exercise supervision over the fulfillment of the orders of the President of the State Affairs Commission of the Democratic People's Republic of Korea and the decisions and directives of the Commission, and take measures for their fulfillment;
- abrogate decisions and directives of State organs which run counter to the orders of the President of the SAC-DPRK and the decisions and directives of the Commission in its meetings.

In practice, SAC supervises the Cabinet of North Korea. It also directly supervises the three ministries that are not under the Cabinet, namely the Ministry of Defence, Ministry of State Security and the Ministry of Social Security as well as the Korean People's Army, mainly the General Staff Department of the Korean People's Army and General Political Bureau of the Korean People's Army. The Supreme Guard Command, which is responsible for the top leadership and government protection, is also under its command. One additional entity, the State Physical Culture and Sports Guidance Commission (국가체육지도위원회), is also under the SAC as its Chairman is appointed by the Commission.

== Members ==
The following are the current members of the State Affairs Commission as of 29 September 2021:

President of the State Affairs Commission
President	Political party	Member since	Other positions
Kim Jong Un 김정은 (born 1984)	Workers' Party of Korea	29 June 2016	General Secretary of the Workers' Party of Korea; Member of the Presidium of the Politburo of the Workers' Party of Korea; Supreme Commander of the Armed Forces of North Korea
First Vice President of the State Affairs Commission
First Vice President	Political party	Member since	Other positions
Choe Ryong-hae 최룡해 (born 1950)	Workers' Party of Korea	29 June 2016	Member of the Presidium of the Politburo of the Workers' Party of Korea; Chairman of the Standing Committee of the Supreme People's Assembly
Vice President of the State Affairs Commission
Vice President	Political party	Member since	Other positions
Kim Tok-hun 김덕훈 (born 1961)	Workers' Party of Korea	29 September 2021	Member of the Presidium of the Politburo of the Workers' Party of Korea
Members of the State Affairs Commission
Member	Political party	Member since	Other positions
Kim Yong-chol 김영철 (born 1945)	Workers' Party of Korea	29 June 2016	Member of the Political Bureau of the Central Committee of the Workers' Party of Korea; Director of the Unified Front Department of the Central Committee of the Workers' Party of Korea
Ri Chang-dae 리창대	Workers' Party of Korea	11 April 2018	Member of the Political Bureau of the Central Committee of the Workers' Party of Korea; Member of the Central Military Commission of the Workers' Party of Korea; Minister of State Security; Colonel General of the Korean People's Army
Choe Son-hui 최선희	Workers' Party of Korea	12 April 2020	Member of the Political Bureau of the Central Committee of the Workers' Party of Korea; Minister of Foreign Affairs
Jo Yong-won 조용원 (born 1957)	Workers' Party of Korea	29 September 2021	Member of the Presidium of the Politburo of the Workers' Party of Korea; Secretary of the Central Committee of the Workers' Party of Korea; Member of the Central Military Commission of the Workers' Party of Korea; Colonel General of the Korean People's Army
Pak Jong-chon 박정천	Workers' Party of Korea	29 September 2021	Member of the Presidium of the Politburo of the Workers' Party of Korea; Secretary of the Central Committee of the Workers' Party of Korea
O Su-yong 오수용 (born 1944)	Workers' Party of Korea	29 September 2021	Member of the Political Bureau of the Central Committee of the Workers' Party of Korea; Director of the Economic Department of the Central Committee of the Workers' Party of Korea
Ri Yong-gil 리영길 (born 1955)	Workers' Party of Korea	29 September 2021	Member of the Political Bureau of the Central Committee of the Workers' Party of Korea; Vice Chairman of the Central Military Commission of the Workers' Party of Korea; Minister of National Defence; General of the Korean People's Army
Jang Jong-nam 장정남	Workers' Party of Korea	29 September 2021	Alternate Member of the Political Bureau of the Central Committee of the Workers' Party of Korea; Minister of Public Security; Lieutenant General
Kim Song-nam 김성남 (born 1953)	Workers' Party of Korea	29 September 2021	Alternate Member of the Political Bureau of the Central Committee of the Workers' Party of Korea; Director of the International Department of the Central Committee of the Workers' Party of Korea
Kim Yo Jong 김여정 (born 1987)	Workers' Party of Korea	29 September 2021	Deputy Department Director of the Publicity and Information Department of the Central Committee of the Workers' Party of Korea
