= Presidium of the Politburo of the Workers' Party of Korea =

Leadership committee of North Korea's ruling party

Presidium of the Political Bureau of the Central Committee of the Workers' Party of Korea 조선로동당 중앙위원회 정치국 상무위원회

Leadership
- Status: Highest body of the Central Committee between sessions, Workers' Party of Korea
- General Secretary: Kim Jong Un
- Members: Kim Jong-un; Pak Thae-song; Jo Yong-won; Kim Jae-ryong; Ri Il-hwan
- Elected by: Central Committee
- Responsible to: Politburo of the Workers' Party of Korea
- Seats: 5

- Presidium of the Politburo of the Workers' Party of Korea
- Chosŏn'gŭl: 조선로동당 중앙위원회 정치국 상무위원회
- Hancha: 朝鮮勞動黨 中央委員會 政治局 常務委員會
- Revised Romanization: Joseon Rodongdang Jungang Wiwonhoe Jeongchiguk Sangmu Wiwonhoe
- McCune–Reischauer: Chosŏn Rodongdang Chungang Wiwŏnhoe Chŏngch'iguk Sangmu Wiwŏnhoe

The Presidium of the Political Bureau of the Workers' Party of Korea, or simply the Presidium, and formerly known as the Standing Committee (1946–61), is a committee consisting of the top leadership of the Workers' Party of Korea. Historically, it has been composed of one to five members, and currently has five members. Its officially mandated purpose is to conduct policy discussions and make decisions on major issues when the Politburo, a larger decision-making body, is not in session. While the Presidium in theory reports to the Politburo, which in turn reports to the larger Central Committee, in practice the Presidium is supreme over its parent bodies and acts as the most powerful decision-making body in North Korea. The general secretary of the Workers' Party of Korea convenes and presides over Presidium of the Politburo meetings. As North Korea is a one-party state, the Presidium's decisions de facto have the force of law. Its role is roughly analogous to that of the Politburo Standing Committee of the Chinese Communist Party.

== History ==
The Presidium was revitalized at the 3rd Conference, with four new members appointed: Kim Yong-nam (President of the Presidium of the Supreme People's Assembly, head of state), Choe Yong-rim (Premier, head of government), Vice Marshal Jo Myong-rok (Director of the General Political Bureau of the Korean People's Army) and Vice Marshal Ri Yong-ho (Chief of the General Staff). The appointment of two military officers was considered by outside observers to be in line with Kim Jong Il's military-first politics. It was believed that Ri Yong-ho was Kim Jong Un's personal military escort at the time, similar to O Jin-u's role during Kim Jong Il's early rule. At the 4th Conference, Chasu Choe Ryong-hae was appointed to the Standing Committee.

== Current members ==
Member	Member since	Other positions
Kim Jong Un 김정은 (born 1984)	11 April 2012	General Secretary of the Workers' Party of Korea; President of the State Affairs Commission
Pak Thae-song 박태성 (born 1955)	23 February 2026	Vice President of the State Affairs Commission; Premier of the Cabinet
Jo Yong-won 조용원 (born 1957)	10 January 2021	First Vice President of the State Affairs Commission; Chairman of the Standing Committee of the Supreme People's Assembly; Chairman of the Supreme People's Assembly
Kim Jae-ryong 김재룡 (born 1959)	23 February 2026	Secretary of the Central Committee of the Workers' Party of Korea; Director of the Organizational Leadership Department; Member of the State Affairs Commission of North Korea
Ri Il-hwan 리일환 (born 1960)	23 February 2026	Secretary of the Central Committee of the Workers' Party of Korea; Director of the Publicity and Information Department

== See also ==
- Politburo Standing Committee of the Chinese Communist Party
- Four pillars (Vietnam)
