= 4th Secretariat of the Workers' Party of Korea =

The 4th Secretariat of the Workers' Party of Korea (WPK) (Korean: 4차 조선로동당 비서국), officially the Secretariat of the 4th Congress of the Workers' Party of Korea, was elected by the 14th Plenary Session of the 4th Central Committee on 12 October 1966.

== Members ==
Rank	Name	Hangul	CH&VI	5th SEC	Left office	Duration	Positions
1	Kim Il Sung	김일성	Old	Reelected	13 November 1970	4 years and 32 days	General Secretary of the WPK Central Committee
2	Choe Yong-gon	최용건	Old	Reelected	13 November 1970	4 years and 32 days	—
3	Kim Il	김일	Old	Reelected	13 November 1970	4 years and 32 days	—
4	Pak Kum-chol	박금철	Old	Purged	8 May 1967	208 days	—
5	Yi Hyo-sun	이효선	Old	Purged	8 May 1967	208 days	—
6	Kim Kwang-hyop	김광협	New	Purged	July 1970	3 years and 262 days	—
7	Sok San	속산	New	Reelected	13 November 1970	4 years and 32 days	—
8	Ho Pong-hak	허봉학	New	Purged	30 June 1969	2 years and 261 days	—
9	Kim Yong-ju	김영주	New	Reelected	13 November 1970	4 years and 32 days	—
10	Pak Yong-guk	박용국	New	Purged	8 May 1967	208 days	—
11	Kim To-man	金道満	New	Purged	8 May 1967	208 days	—

== Add ons ==
Name	Hangul	5th SEC	Took office	Left office	Duration	Positions
Yi Kuk-chin	이국진	Demoted	30 June 1969	13 November 1970	1 year and 136 days	—
Kim Chung-nin	김중린	Reelected	30 June 1969	13 November 1970	1 year and 136 days	—
Yang Hyon-sop	양형섭	Reelected	30 June 1969	13 November 1970	1 year and 136 days	—
