= Kim Song-hye =

North Korean politician

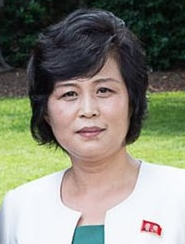

Head of the Secretary Bureau of the Committee for the Peaceful Reunification of the Fatherland

Personal details
- Born: 17 July 1965 (age 61) South Pyongan Province, North Korea
- Party: Workers' Party of Korea
- Education: Kim Il Sung University

Korean name
- Hangul: 김성혜
- RR: Gim Seonghye
- MR: Kim Sŏnghye

Kim Song-hye (Korean: 김성혜, born 17 July 1965) is a North Korean politician. As the head of the Secretarial Bureau of the Committee for the Peaceful Reunification of the Fatherland (CPRK), she has taken part in numerous negotiations between North and South Korea. She has participated in talks at the 2000 inter-Korean summit, the 15th and 16th North–South Ministerial Talks in 2005, the 2007 inter-Korean summit, and most notably the inter-Korean working level talks of 2013 where she headed the North Korean delegation.

Kim has hosted many South Korean dignitaries visiting the North, including the future President of South Korea Park Geun-hye in 2002, the former First Lady of South Korea Lee Hee-ho in 2011, and the Seoul Philharmonic Orchestra in 2012.

It is highly unusual for a woman to be tasked with an important area of foreign policy in North Korea. Consequentially, Kim has been called the "female hard worker for South Korean affairs". Her feminine clothing has stood out in the otherwise largely male North Korean delegations and attracted media attention. Kim's prominent role as a negotiator has been explained as a gesture of friendliness from the North Korean government as well as a way to match the presidency of Park Geun-hye, South Korea's first female president.

== Early life ==
Kim Song-hye was born on 17 July 1965 in South Pyongan Province. Described as "very smart", she is possibly a graduate of Kim Il Sung University, although "her accurate academic background has yet to be known".

== Career ==
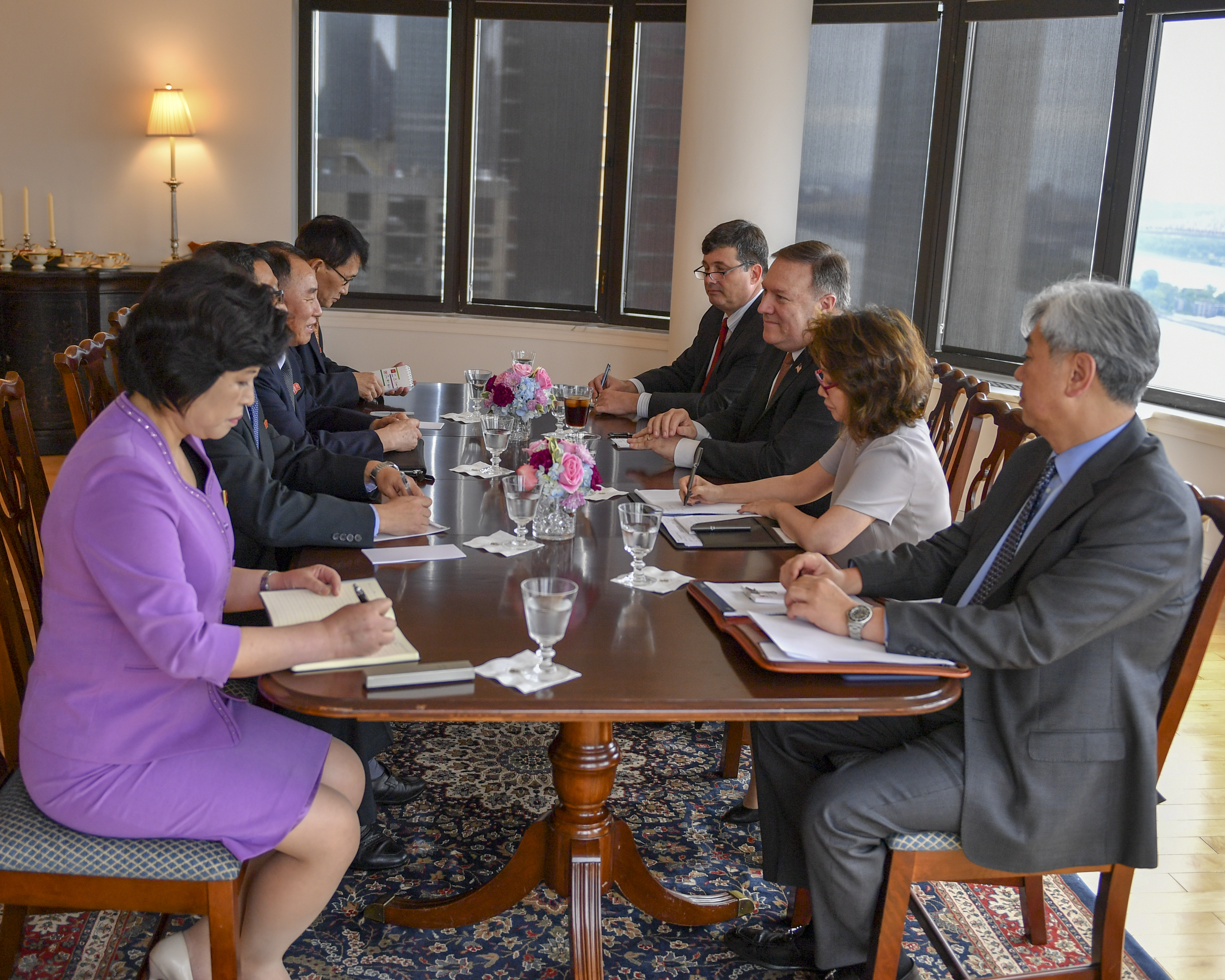
Kim in negotiations with US Secretary of State Mike Pompeo

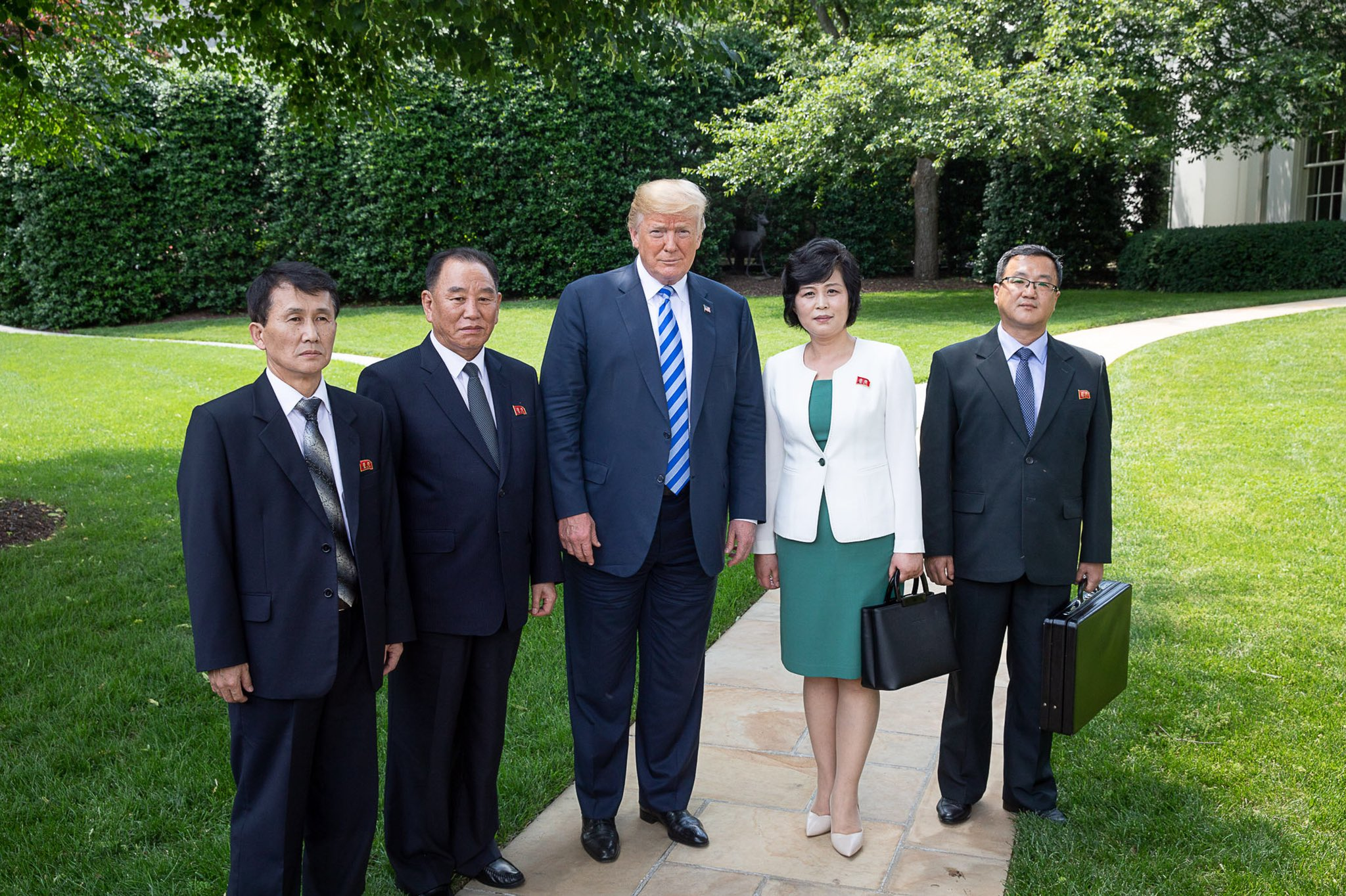
Kim Song-hye with Donald Trump

Kim was the head of the Secretarial Bureau of the Committee for the Peaceful Reunification of the Fatherland (CPRK), a front organization of the ruling Workers' Party of Korea (WPK) for handling inter-Korean affairs and the reunification question. She also has a post in the party's Propaganda and Agitation Department. Her position is equivalent to that of South Korea's Minister of Unification.

Kim was part of the North's delegation negotiating the June 15th North–South Joint Declaration at the 2000 inter-Korean summit. In 2005, she took part in the 15th North–South Ministerial Talks in Seoul as one of three female delegates, the first ever dispatched to cabinet-level talks by North Korea. In total, Kim has visited the South Korean capital Seoul more than 10 times. Kim was also present at the 16th installment of the ministerial talks held in Pyongyang. Likewise, she interacted with the South Korean delegation at the 2007 inter-Korean summit there.

Kim hosted Lee Hee-ho, the former First Lady of South Korea, during her visit to Pyongyang for the state funeral of Kim Jong Il in December 2011. The following year she received the Seoul Philharmonic Orchestra on their visit.

In 2013, she headed the North Korean delegation of inter-Korean working level talks at the Freedom House in the Joint Security Area.

It is rare for a North Korean female to work in the field of inter-Korean relations. Consequentially, Kim has been given the nickname "female hard worker for South Korean affairs". During the North–South Ministerial Talks in 2005 for instance, she attracted media attention by standing out from the conservatively dressed mostly male delegation with her white two-piece suit. When the South Korean Minister of Unification Chung Dong-young introduced her, he noted that respecting women is a feature of Korean culture.

Experts have taken her role as a female negotiator during the 2013 working level talks as an implication that the North Korean government wants to conduct the talks in a friendly mood. North Korea could have also tried to match the position of Park Geun-hye, South Korea's first female president, whom Kim hosted on a visit to Pyongyang in 2002 prior to her presidency. During the 2013 meeting she was noted for wearing a turquoise suit similar to that worn by Ri Sol-ju, the wife of Kim Jong Un when she was introduced to the public as North Korea's First Lady. Kim also wore high heels, which has been interpreted as adopting a Western fashion at the cost of comfort.

In 2018, she accompanied Kim Yo Jong as a member of the North Korean delegation to the 2018 Winter Olympics in Pyeongchang, South Korea. She also took part in meetings ahead of the 2018 North Korea–United States summit with US Secretary of State Mike Pompeo and President Donald Trump. She was also part of the delegation to the summit itself.

== See also ==
- Choe Son-hui
- Inter-Korean summits
- Kim Kyong-hui
- Kim Sol-song
- Kim Yo Jong
- Politics of North Korea
- Ro Song-sil
- Women in North Korea
