= Politburo Standing Committee (disambiguation) =

The Politburo Standing Committee can refer to:

- Politburo Standing Committee of the Chinese Communist Party
- Politburo Standing Committee of the Workers' Party of Korea
- Politburo Standing Committee of the Communist Party of Vietnam (1996-2001)
