= Samtaesong =

North Korean fast food chain

- Industry: Restaurant
- Genre: Fast food restaurant
- Founded: May 2009
- Founder: Patrick Soh; Quek Cher Lan; Timothy Tan
- Number of locations: 30 (2020)
- Products: hamburgers; fried chicken; kimchi; waffles

Samtaesong (Korean: 삼태성청량음료) is a fast food restaurant chain headquartered in Pyongyang, North Korea.

== History ==
The restaurant was founded by Singaporeans Patrick Soh, Quek Cher Lan, and Timothy Tan. According to Soh, North Korean officials had sampled products from his Singaporean fast food restaurant Waffletown and wanted to introduce them to North Koreans. The name Samtaesong, or "Three Huge Stars", refers to Supreme Leader Kim Jong Il, his father Kim Il Sung, and his mother Kim Jong Sook; according to a report by Radio Free Asia, Samtaesong is "entirely owned" by Kim Jong Il's sister Kim Kyong Hui, while day-to-day operations are overseen by Vice Minister of Light Industry Kim Kyeong Oak. The first Samtaesong outlet opened in May 2009 in Pyongyang. As of June 2018, the restaurant has thirty outlets in North Korea, a majority of which offer takeaway only.

== Menu ==
Samtaesong offers hamburgers marketed as "minced beef and bread" (Korean: 다진 소고기 겹빵), alongside kimchi, waffles, fried chicken, and hot dogs. The restaurant also serves coffee, smoothies, and locally manufactured alcoholic beverages ranging from Pyongyang Cider to Kumgang Draft Beer.
