= 5th Secretariat of the Workers' Party of Korea =

The 5th Secretariat of the Workers' Party of Korea (WPK)(5차 조선로동당 비서국), officially the Secretariat of the 5th Congress of the Workers' Party of Korea, was elected by the 1st Plenary Session of the 5th Central Committee on 13 November 1970.

== Members ==
| Rank | Name | Hangul | 4th SEC | 6th SEC | Left office | Duration | Positions |
|---|---|---|---|---|---|---|---|
| 1 | Kim Il Sung | 김일성 | Old | Reelected | 14 October 1980 | 9 years and 336 days | General Secretary of the WPK Central Committee |
| 2 | Choe Yong-gon | 최용건 | Old | Dead | 19 September 1976 | 5 years and 311 days | — |
| 3 | Kim Il | 김일 | Old | Demoted | 14 October 1980 | 9 years and 336 days | — |
| 4 | Kim Yong-ju | 김영주 | Old | Removed | 13 February 1974 | 3 years and 92 days | — |
| 5 | O Jin-u | 오진우 | New | Demoted | 14 October 1980 | 9 years and 336 days | — |
| 6 | Kim Tong-gyu | 김동규 | New | Purged | 13 December 1977 | 7 years and 30 days | — |
| 7 | Kim Chung-nin | 김중린 | Old | Reelected | 14 October 1980 | 9 years and 336 days | — |
| 8 | Han Ik-su | 한익수 | New | Dead | 5 September 1978 | 7 years and 296 days | — |
| 9 | Hyon Mu-gwang | 현무광 | New | Demoted | 14 October 1980 | 9 years and 336 days | — |
| 10 | Yang Hyong-sop | 양형섭 | Old | Demoted | 14 October 1980 | 9 years and 336 days | — |

== Add ons ==
| Name | Hangul | 6th SEC | Took office | Left office | Duration | Positions |
|---|---|---|---|---|---|---|
| Kim Jong Il | 김정일 | Reelected | 17 September 1973 | 14 October 1980 | 7 years and 27 days | — |
| Hwang Jang-yop | 황장엽 | Reelected | 2 December 1979 | 14 October 1980 | 317 days | — |
