= Kim Yo Jong =

North Korean politician (born 1987)

- 김여정
- Kim in 2018

Director of the General Affairs Department of the Workers' Party of Korea
- Incumbent
- Assumed office 28 February 2026
- General Secretary: Kim Jong Un

Deputy Director of the Propaganda and Agitation Department
- In office 28 November 2014 – 23 February 2026
- General Secretary: Kim Jong Un
- Director: Kim Ki-nam; Pak Kwang-ho; Ri Il-hwan
- Preceded by: Ri Jae-il

Member of the State Affairs Commission
- In office 30 September 2021 – 22 March 2026
- President: Kim Jong Un

Member of the Supreme People's Assembly for Kallimgil
- Incumbent
- Assumed office 10 March 2019
- Preceded by: O Ryong-thaek

Personal details
- Born: 26 September 1987 (age 39) Pyongyang, North Korea
- Party: Workers' Party of Korea (since 2007)
- Spouse: Choe Song (m. 2014)
- Children: 2
- Parents: Kim Jong Il; Ko Yong-hui
- Relatives: Kim family
- Education: Kim Il Sung University

Korean name
- Hangul: 김여정
- Hanja: 金與正
- RR: Gim Yeojeong
- MR: Kim Yŏjŏng

Kim Yo Jong (Note: Also transliterated as Kim Yo-jong.) (Korean: 김여정; born 26 September 1987) is a North Korean politician and diplomat. She is the younger sister of the supreme leader of North Korea, Kim Jong Un, and the youngest child of former supreme leader Kim Jong Il. She is believed to be among the most powerful figures in the secretive North Korean political apparatus.

As of February 2026, Kim is the director of the General Affairs Department of the Workers' Party of Korea (WPK). This high-level appointment occurred during the first plenary meeting of the 9th Central Committee, held alongside the Ninth Party Congress in Pyongyang. Since March 2026, she has also been serving as an alternate member of the Politburo of the Workers' Party of Korea. Between September 2021 and March 2026, she was a member of State Affairs Commission of North Korea. She served as an alternate member of the Politburo from 2017 to 2019, and again from 2020 to 2021.

== Early life ==
Kim Yo Jong is the youngest child of former North Korean supreme leader Kim Jong Il and his second mistress, Ko Yong-hui. The U.S. Treasury lists her birthdate as 26 September 1989, while South Korean sources place her birth on 26 September 1987. Born in Pyongyang, she spent most of her early childhood at her mother's residence, growing up alongside her siblings. Between 1996 and December 2000, Kim studied with her elder brothers at the Liebefeld-Steinhölzli public school in Bern, Switzerland, under the assumed name "Pak Mi-hyang". During this time, she is believed to have developed a close relationship with her brother and future leader, Kim Jong Un. After returning to Pyongyang, she completed a degree in computer science at Kim Il Sung University.

== Political career ==
In 2007, Kim was appointed as a junior cadre in the ruling Workers' Party of Korea (WPK), possibly working under her father or her aunt, Kim Kyong-hui. In 2009 and 2010, she was active in establishing her father's hereditary succession campaign, also working in the National Defense Commission and in her father's personal secretariat. Beginning in March 2009, she joined a group of close aides and family members that appeared at her father's side in his public appearances, but her presence was rarely noted until September 2010, when she was identified among participants at the 3rd Conference of the WPK.

=== Anonymous public appearances ===
Kim Yo Jong received much publicity during the funeral service for Kim Jong Il in December 2011, appearing alongside Kim Jong Un and leading groups of senior party officials in bowing at her father's casket. At the beginning of 2012, she was reportedly given a position at the National Defence Commission as tour manager for her brother, arranging his itineraries, schedule, logistical needs, and security arrangements. She did not appear in news reports of the time except in November 2012, when the Korean Central Television showed her accompanying Kim Jong Un and her aunt at a military riding ground.

=== Public recognition ===
Kim received her first official mention in state media in March 2014, when she accompanied her brother in voting for the Supreme People's Assembly. She was named a "senior official" of the WPK Central Committee. In October 2014, she was reported to have taken over state duties for her brother while he underwent medical treatment. The next month, she was appointed First Deputy Director of the party's Propaganda and Agitation Department.

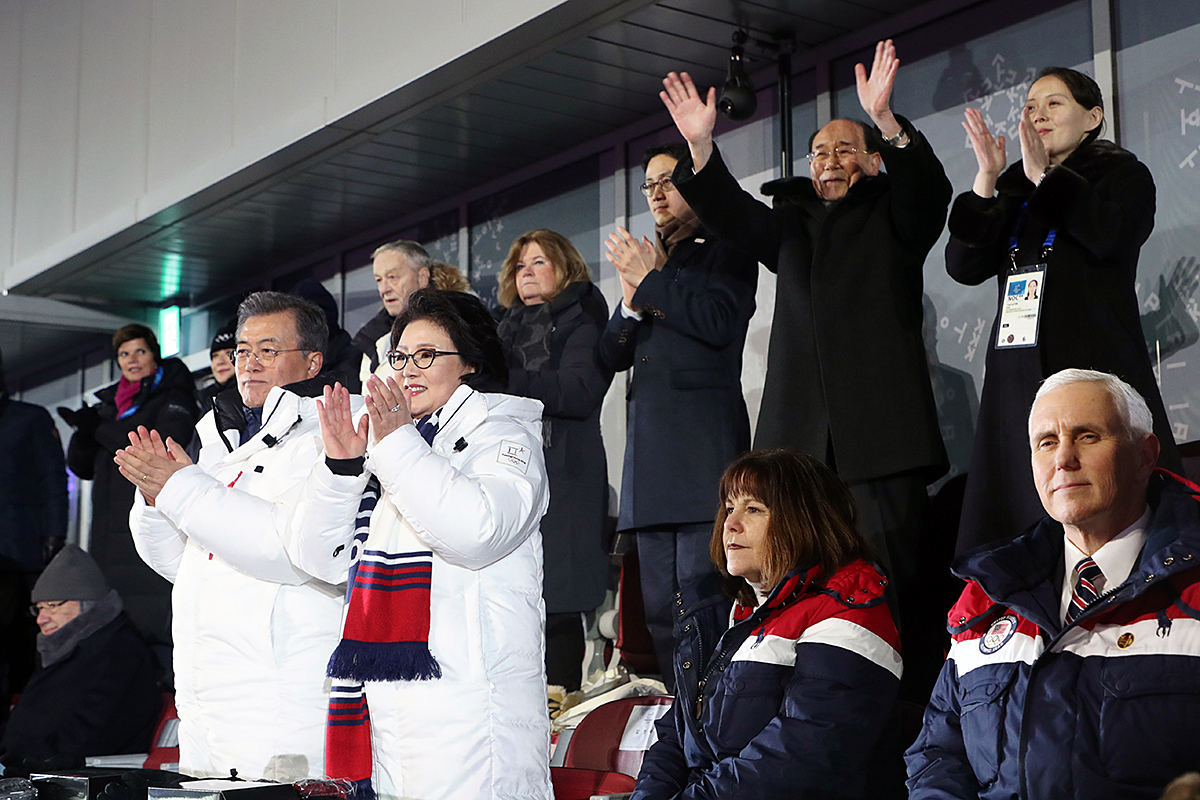
Kim Yo Jong (far right, upper row) standing next to Kim Yong-nam (chairman of the Standing Committee of the Supreme People's Assembly), South Korean President Moon Jae-in and his wife, and U.S. Vice President Mike Pence at the 2018 Winter Olympics opening ceremony

=== Leadership of the Propaganda and Agitation Department ===
In her role as vice-director at the department, Kim is responsible for "assisting in consolidating Kim Jong-un's power" by implementing "idolisation projects". In July 2015, reports described her as playing the role of de facto leader of the department, with nominal director Kim Ki-nam in a supporting role. She also holds a vice-ministerial post, but her portfolio is not known. She regularly accompanies Kim Jong Un on his "field guidance" trips.

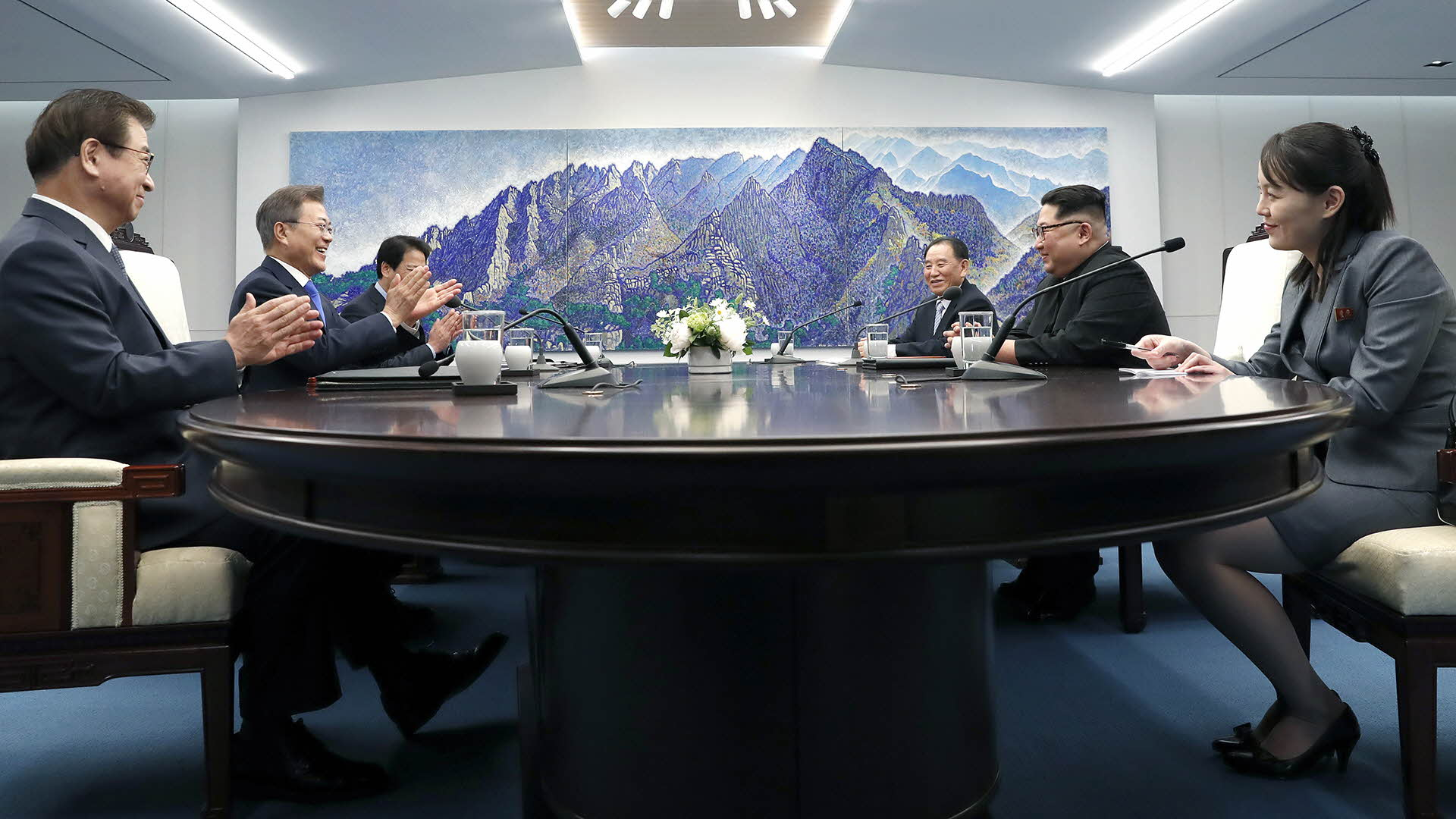
Talks inside the Peace House in April 2018

She has been said to be the driving force behind the development of her brother's cult of personality, modeled after that of their grandfather, Kim Il Sung. Thae Yong-ho, a North Korean defector and former diplomat, said in 2017 that Kim Yo Jong organized all major public events in North Korea. She was said to have encouraged her brother to present an image of a "man of the people" with, for example, rides on fairground attractions and his friendship with basketball star Dennis Rodman.

In January 2017, she was placed on the United States Department of the Treasury's Specially Designated Nationals List in response to alleged human rights abuses in North Korea.

=== Ascension to the Politburo ===
In October 2017, Kim Yo Jong was made an alternate member of the Politburo, only the second woman to be appointed to this decision-making body. As previously speculated, her ascension to the country's supreme governing body may indicate that she is Kim Jong Un's replacement for his aunt, Kim Kyong-hui (with whom Kim Yo Jong is said to have a good relationship), who has not played an active role in his regime. It has also been hinted that her newly assigned position would also put her in charge of the State Security Department.

=== Special envoy of Kim Jong Un ===
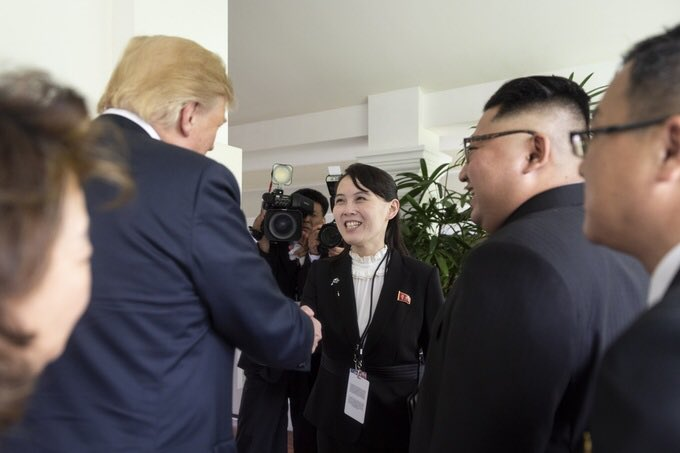
Kim with her brother meeting U.S. President Donald Trump at the 2018 Singapore Summit

On 9 February 2018, Kim attended the 2018 Winter Olympics opening ceremony in Pyeongchang, South Korea. This was the first time since the Korean War that a member of the ruling Kim family had visited South Korea. She met with South Korean President Moon Jae-in on 10 February and revealed that she was dispatched as a special envoy of Kim Jong Un. She also delivered a personally written letter from Kim to Moon. Kim was later part of her brother's team during the 2018 North Korea–United States Singapore Summit and the 2019 North Korea–United States Hanoi Summit. Her involvement in diplomatic affairs continued as she issued an official statement in March 2020 from her capacity as first deputy department director of the party.

According to Kim Yong-hyun, a professor of North Korean studies at Dongguk University in Seoul, and others, the promotion of Kim Yo Jong and others is a sign that "the Kim Jong Un regime has ended its coexistence with the remnants of the previous Kim Jong Il regime by carrying out a generational replacement in the party's key elite posts". Tom O'Connor of Newsweek echoed this opinion, writing that Kim Yo Jong's rise to power was part of Kim Jong Un's overall plan to appoint younger people in place of his father's older elites who may have harboured doubts about the younger Kim Jong Un's ability to lead North Korea.

=== Activities since 2019 ===
Kim was elected to the Supreme People's Assembly during the 2019 North Korean parliamentary election, representing Kallimgil. In April of the same year, she was briefly removed from the Politburo, before being reinstated in April 2020. She was excluded again from the Politburo elected after the 8th Party Congress and demoted from the first deputy department director to deputy department director on 10 January 2021. But some commentators and analysts say her influence in the government remains unchanged.

On 8 July 2020, Lee Kyung-jae, an attorney with the South Korean law firm Dongbuka, sued Kim for her involvement in the demolition of the Inter-Korean Liaison Office. Lee also sued Pak Jong-chon, Chief of the General Staff of the Korean People's Army. Lee added that Kim had ordered the liaison office destroyed and was "ultimately responsible" for its destruction.

In March 2021, Kim condemned virtual joint military drills held in South Korea, calling them a "serious challenge." She also warned the administration of President Joe Biden, saying, "If it wants to sleep in peace for the coming four years, it had better refrain from causing a stink at its first step." Kim threatened to decommission the Committee for the Peaceful Reunification of the Country and to shutter the Kumgangsan International Travel "and other organizations concerned as any cooperation and exchange with the South Korean authorities antagonizing us are no longer necessary." Kim also said these measures have been reported to Kim Jong Un.

In September 2021, it was reported that Kim was promoted to be a member of the State Affairs Commission of North Korea.

In September 2022, in response to South Korean president Yoon Suk-yeol's offer to economically aid the DPRK in exchange for denuclearization, Kim made a speech before the Assembly on behalf of her brother recommending that Yoon "shut his mouth", commenting that Yoon had "nothing better to say". She additionally blamed the South for introducing COVID-19 to the country, and threatened that if the virus returned to North Korea, she would retaliate against South Korea.

In September 2023, Kim Yo Jong accompanied Kim Jong Un at a summit in Russia with Russian President Vladimir Putin. She was seen with Kim Jong Un as he signed a visitor book at Vostochny Cosmodrome.

In February 2026, Kim Yo Jong was given a promotion which named her a full department director during the 9th Congress of the Workers' Party of Korea. On 28 February, it was revealed that she was appointed as the director of the General Affairs Department.

== Public image ==
In April 2020, rumors of Kim Jong Un's ill health brought attention to Kim Yo Jong as a possible successor of the government's leadership in North Korea. During this period, she gained significant attention on social media including informational videos, and 'stanning'. In August, she gained additional attention on social media when Kim Jong Un was reported to have been in a coma.

== Personal life ==
In late 2014, she reportedly married Choe Song, the second son of government official Choe Ryong-hae. Choe Song is thought to be a fellow alumnus of Kim Il Sung University and either an official at Room 39 of the Workers' Party of Korea (WPK) or an employee at a military unit responsible for guarding the country's leader. Kim Yo Jong reportedly gave birth to a child in May 2015. During the 2018 Winter Olympics, Kim was reported to have disclosed being pregnant.

At a New Year performance on 31 December 2024, Kim Yo Jong was spotted with two children (one boy and one girl), alleged to be hers. This is the first time she has appeared with children in state media. These children appeared again at the launching ceremony of the Choe Hyon destroyer on 25 April 2025.

Select (Note: To keep the tree of manageable size, it omits five out of the seven known legitimate children of Kim Il Sung. Other children not shown in the tree are: Kim Man-il (1944–1947; child of Kim Jong-suk), Kim Kyong-jin (born 1952; child of Kim Song-ae), Kim Yong-il (1955–2000; child of Kim Song-ae), and Kim Kyong-suk (born 1951; child of Kim Song-ae). A stillborn daughter is also omitted. Kim Il Sung was reported to have had other children with women who he was not married to; they included Kim Hyŏn-nam (born 1972). Also, only some of the descendants of Kim Jong Il and Kim Jong Un (Kim Il Sung's successors) are included.) family tree of North Korea's ruling Kim family (Note: Korean names often have a variety of transliterations into English, which can be confusing. For example, "Kim Jong Chul" may also be written "Gim Jeong-cheol" or "Kim Jŏng-ch'ŏl" among many other variations. See Korean romanization for more information.) (Note: Huss, Kan; Frost, Clay. "North Korea's First Family: Mapping the personal and political drama of the Kim clan". msnbc.com. Archived from the original on 4 February 2012. (Confirms many, but not all, of the birth and death years. See individual articles for more references.))

Kim Song-ryeong; 1810–1899
Kim Ŭngu; 1848–1878
Kim Pohyŏn; 1871–1955
Kim Hyong-jik; 1894–1926	Kang Pan Sok; 1892–1932
Kim Jong-suk; 1917–1949	Kim Il Sung; 1912–1994	Kim Song-ae; 1924–2014	Kim Yong-ju; 1920–2021
Kim Young-sook; 1947–	Song Hye-rim; 1937–2002	Kim Jong Il; 1941? (Note: Official North Korean biographies of Kim Jong Il list his birth year as 1942. The Korean calendar is based upon the Chinese zodiac which is believed to characterize one's personality. The year 1942 (Year of the Horse), in addition to being 30 years since Kim Il Sung's birth may be viewed as a better year than others, thus creating a motive to lie about a birth year.)–2011	Ko Yong-hui; 1952–2004	Kim Ok; 1964–	Kim Kyong-hui; 1946–	Jang Song-thaek; 1946–2013	Kim Pyong Il; 1954–
Kim Sol-song; 1974–	Kim Jong-nam; 1971–2017	Kim Jong Chul; 1981–	Kim Jong Un; 1983? (Note: Official North Korean biographies of Kim Jong Un list his birth year as 1982. The Korean calendar is based upon the Chinese zodiac which is believed to characterize one's personality. The year 1982 (Year of the Dog), in addition to being 70 years since Kim Il Sung's birth, may be viewed as a better year than others, thus creating a motive to lie about a birth year.)–	Ri Sol-ju c. 1986–	Kim Yo Jong; 1987–
Kim Han-sol; 1995–	Kim Ju Ae c. 2012 (Note: Birth year for Kim Ju Ae is not publicly known. She may have been born in either late 2012 or early 2013.)–

== See also ==
- Kim Ju Ae
- Kim Song-hye
- Ro Song-sil
- Succession of Kim Jong Un
- Women in North Korea
