= Ri Jae-il =

North Korean politician (1935–2021)

First Deputy Director of the Propaganda and Agitation Department
- In office May 2004 – November 2014
- Supreme Leader: Kim Jong Un; Kim Jong Il
- Succeeded by: Kim Yo Jong

Personal details
- Born: 1935 Japanese controlled Korea
- Died: February 4, 2021 (aged 85–86)
- Party: Workers' Party of Korea

Ri Jae-il (Korean: 리재일, 1935 – 4 February 2021) was a North Korean politician and a member of the Propaganda and Agitation Department of the Workers' Party of Korea as well as member of the Supreme People's Assembly.

== Biography ==
Ri Jae il was born in 1935. He started his professional career as a journalist, he was the editor of the capital's daily Pyongyang Sinmun. Little is known about his civil and political career before 1992, when he became deputy director of one of the departments of the Central Committee of the Workers' Party of Korea. In February 2001, he became chairman of the State Publishing Control Committee, the main office dealing with political censorship in North Korea's mass media. From May 2004 to 2014, Ri Jae-il was the first deputy director in the Propaganda and Agitation Department in the Central Committee, which was managed by Ri Il-hwan.

He was a member of the 12th convocation of the Supreme People's Assembly, the unicameral parliament of North Korea. Pursuant to the provisions of the 3rd Conference of the Workers' Party of Korea, on 28 September 2010, Ri Jae-il became a deputy member of the Central Committee. After the death of Kim Jong Il in December 2011, Ri Jae-il was 120th in the 232-person funeral committee. This testified to the formal and actual belonging of Ri Jae il to the political leadership of the Democratic People's Republic of Korea. According to specialists, places on such lists defined the rank of a politician in the hierarchy of the power apparatus.
