= Succession of Kim Jong Un =

The South Korean National Intelligence Service, along with multiple members of the Sejong Institute, expects Kim Ju Ae to succeed Kim Jong Un, the current General Secretary of the Workers' Party of Korea. Other possible successors who have been speculated on are Kim Yo Jong or a collective leadership model.

== Background ==
Political succession in North Korea has happened twice: Kim Jong Il succeeded Kim Il Sung and Kim Jong Un succeeded Kim Jong Il. Kim Jong Un succeeded Kim Jong Il somewhere between late 2008 and early 2009. To achieve political continuity, Kim Il Sung and Kim Jong Il chose a son as their successor because they believed a son would be more loyal to them. The two leaders chose their successor early to allow their successor to stabilize their power before the death of the incumbent.

== Predictions ==
38 North predicted 4 possible scenarios. If Kim Jong Un lives long enough to groom a specific successor, successors, such as Kim Ju Ae, have a higher chance at succeeding Kim Jong Un. If Kim Jong Un suddenly dies, Kim Yo Jong has a higher chance of succeeding Kim Jong Un due to the other successors not having a political base. 38 North predicted that a regency model—political and military elites sharing power—could emerge if Kim Jong Un's successor had weak legitimacy. 38 North also predicted that a hybrid of the previous possibilities could happen.

Leon Petrov, a senior lecturer at the International College of Management, Sydney, predicted that a collective leadership model would happen if Kim Jong Un's successor were too young to rule. Petrov also predicted that, if Kim Yo Jong gained power, she would be replaced by another member of the Kim family due to the paternalistic role of the Great Leader of North Korea plays in the ideology of North Korea.

Kim Ju Ae's public prominence has led to speculation by North Korea analysts about her future position in the country. Richard Lloyd Parry of The Times suggests that it may be a response to rivalries within the North Korean government and an attempt to reassert the political supremacy of the Kim family.

Go Myong-hyun, a senior fellow at the Asan Institute for Policy Studies in Seoul, likewise argues that Kim Ju Ae's public presentation is that of a princess and is an attempt by state media to normalise the Kim family's rule "by adopting the trappings of [a] European-style monarchy". Cheong Seong Chang, the director of Center for Korean Peninsula Strategy at the Sejong Institute, argued that Kim Ju Ae being trained at an early age was due to Kim Jong Un having to consolidate power after the early death of Kim Jong Il and the poor health of Kim Jong Un.

Mitch Shin of The Diplomat argued that Kim Jong Un was using Kim Ju Ae to block international intelligence from looking into his rumored oldest son. Other experts believe that the direct descendance from the Mount Paektu bloodline—the mountain used to legitimatize the Kim family—will be more important than the patriarchy of North Korea. Lee Sung-Yoon, a fellow at the Sejong Institute, believes that there is no doubt that Kim Jong Un is training Kim Ju Ae to be his successor. Rah Jong-yil has stated that Kim Ju Ae could be opposed by Kim Yo Jong.

=== South Korean National Intelligence Service ===
In 2024, the South Korean National Intelligence Service released a report that Kim Ju Ae was receiving training to succeed her father. Cho Taeyong gave the report to and answered questions about it from Youn Kun-Young. Kun-Young later stated that the response by Taeyong didn't contain any other information about Kim Ju Ae. The National Intelligence Service also stated that, if Kim Jong Un's health doesn't improve, he is at risk of cardiovascular disease.

Park Jie-won, who served as the National Intelligence Service's director from 2020 to 2022, dismissed the report's findings, noting that possible successors had previously been kept hidden from the public eye. He further argued that the North Korean government has historically been patriarchal, making Kim Ju Ae's ascension unlikely. Park's comments were echoed by a number of North Korea analysts who further posited that Kim Ju Ae, being a child, was politically unproven, and so the decision to make her Kim Jong Un's successor would have been premature.

On February 12, 2026, the National Intelligence Service reported to the National Assembly Intelligence Committee that Kim Ju Ae had finished her successor training. The National Intelligence Service cited Kim Ju Ae's presence at the Air Force Day celebration, her visit to the Kumsusan Palace of the Sun, and her assistance on some on-site inspection policies as the reasons for her training being complete. The results of the committee meeting were revealed by Democratic Party of Korea committee floor leader Park Sun-won and People Power Party committee floor leader Lee Seong-gwon.

In April 2026, the National Intelligence Service used images of Kim Ju Ae driving a tank to reiterate their prediction that Kim Ju Ae would succeed Kim Jong Un. According to Sun-won, the images referenced Kim Jong Un's military appearances when he was training to succeed Kim Jong Il. Some experts, such as Hong Min—an analyst at the Korea Institute for National Unification—, asserted that the image of her driving a tank wasn't enough to confirm her succession due to Kim Jong Un appearing independently when he was training to succeed Kim Jong Il.
