= Vice President of the State Affairs Commission =

Deputy head of state of North Korea since 2016

Vice President of the State Affairs Commission of the Democratic People's Republic of Korea
- 조선민주주의인민공화국 국무위원회 부위원장
- Emblem of North Korea

- Flag of North Korea
- Incumbent; Jo Yong-won (as first vice president); Pak Thae-song (as vice president) since 22 March 2026
- Member of: State Affairs Commission
- Residence: Government Complex No. 1, Pyongyang
- Nominator: President of the State Affairs of North Korea
- Appointer: Supreme People's Assembly
- Term length: Five years, renewable
- Constituting instrument: Constitution of North Korea
- Precursor: Vice Chairman of the National Defence Commission
- Formation: 28 December 1972

The vice presidents of the State Affairs Commission of the Democratic People's Republic of Korea (Korean: 조선민주주의인민공화국 국무위원회 부위원장), previously titled as vice chairmen of the State Affairs Commission, are members of the State Affairs Commission under the President of the State Affairs of North Korea and above the commission's members.

The Constitution of North Korea states that the State Affairs Commission includes a first vice president (Korean: 제1부위원장) and vice presidents. The vice presidents are nominated by the president of the State Affairs and elected by the Supreme People's Assembly for a term that coincides with the assembly's term. The vice presidents of the State Affairs Commission may carry out tasks authorized by the president of the State Affairs.

The post was first created under the title of vice chairman of the National Defence Commission through the 1972 North Korean constitution. The position of first vice chairman of the National Defence Commission was created in 1992 and abolished in 2012. With the abolition of the National Defence Commission and its replacement with the State Affairs Commission in 2016, the current position was created under its initial title as vice chairman of the State Affairs Commission. The position of first vice chairman of the State Affairs Commission was unofficially created on 11 April 2019 and was made official through a constitutional amendment on 29 August of the same year. As the position of chairman of the State Affairs Commission began to be referred to as president of the State Affairs in February 2021, the positions of first vice chairman and vice chairman began to be referred to as first vice president and vice president respectively.

The incumbent first vice president of the State Affairs Commission is Choe Ryong-hae, who was elected on 11 April 2019 after serving as vice president since 29 June 2016. The incumbent vice president of the State Affairs Commission is Kim Tok-hun, who was elected on 29 September 2019.

== List of office holders ==
=== First Vice President ===
==== National Defence Commission ====
No.	Portrait	Name (Birth–Death)	Term of office		Party	Chairman	SPA
No.	Portrait	Name (Birth–Death)	Took office	Left office	Party	Chairman	SPA
1		Kim Jong Il 김정일 (1941–2011)	26 May 1990	9 April 1993	Workers' Party of Korea	Kim Il Sung	9th
2		O Jin-u 오진우 (1917–1995)	9 April 1993	25 February 1995	Workers' Party of Korea	Kim Jong Il	9th
Vacant (25 February 1995 – 5 September 1998)						Kim Jong Il	9th
3		Jo Myong-rok 조명록 (1928–2010)	5 September 1998	6 November 2010	Workers' Party of Korea	Kim Jong Il	10th
3		Jo Myong-rok 조명록 (1928–2010)	5 September 1998	6 November 2010	Workers' Party of Korea	Kim Jong Il	11th
3		Jo Myong-rok 조명록 (1928–2010)	5 September 1998	6 November 2010	Workers' Party of Korea	Kim Jong Il	12th
Vacant (6 November 2010 – 13 April 2012)						Kim Jong Il	12th

==== State Affairs Commission ====
No.	Portrait	Name (Birth–Death)	Term of office		Party	President	SPA
No.	Portrait	Name (Birth–Death)	Took office	Left office	Party	President	SPA
4		Choe Ryong-hae 최룡해 (born 1950)	11 April 2019	22 March 2026	Workers' Party of Korea	Kim Jong Un	14th
5		Jo Yong-won 조용원 (born 1957)	22 March 2026	Incumbent	Workers' Party of Korea	Kim Jong Un	15th

=== Vice President ===
==== National Defence Commission ====
No.	Portrait	Name (Birth–Death)	Term of office		Party	Chairman	SPA
No.	Portrait	Name (Birth–Death)	Took office	Left office	Party	Chairman	SPA
1		Choe Hyon 최현 (1907–1982)	28 December 1972	17 December 1977	Workers' Party of Korea	Kim Il Sung	5th
2		O Jin-u 오진우 (1917–1995)	28 December 1972	17 December 1977	Workers' Party of Korea	Kim Il Sung	5th
3		O Paek-ryong 오백룡 (1913–1984)	28 December 1972	17 December 1977	Workers' Party of Korea	Kim Il Sung	5th
(1)		Choe Hyon 최현 (1907–1982)	17 December 1977	5 April 1982	Workers' Party of Korea	Kim Il Sung	6th
(2)		O Jin-u 오진우 (1917–1995)	17 December 1977	5 April 1982	Workers' Party of Korea	Kim Il Sung	6th
(3)		O Paek-ryong 오백룡 (1913–1984)	17 December 1977	5 April 1982	Workers' Party of Korea	Kim Il Sung	6th
(1)		Choe Hyon 최현 (1907–1982)	5 April 1982	10 April 1982	Workers' Party of Korea	Kim Il Sung	7th
(2)		O Jin-u 오진우 (1917–1995)	5 April 1982	30 December 1986	Workers' Party of Korea	Kim Il Sung	7th
(3)		O Paek-ryong 오백룡 (1913–1984)	5 April 1982	6 April 1984	Workers' Party of Korea	Kim Il Sung	7th
(2)		O Jin-u 오진우 (1917–1995)	30 December 1986	26 May 1990	Workers' Party of Korea	Kim Il Sung	8th
(2)		O Jin-u 오진우 (1917–1995)	26 May 1990	9 April 1993	Workers' Party of Korea	Kim Il Sung (until 1993) Kim Jong Il (from 1993)	9th
4		Choe Kwang 최광 (1918–1997)	26 May 1990	21 February 1997	Workers' Party of Korea	Kim Il Sung (until 1993) Kim Jong Il (from 1993)	9th
None (21 February 1997 – 5 September 1998)						Kim Il Sung (until 1993) Kim Jong Il (from 1993)	9th
5		Kim Il-chol 김일철 (1933–2023)	5 September 1998	3 September 2003	Workers' Party of Korea	Kim Jong Il	10th
6		Ri Yong-mu 리용무 (1925–2022)	5 September 1998	3 September 2003	Workers' Party of Korea	Kim Jong Il	10th
7		Yon Hyong-muk 연형묵 (1931–2005)	3 September 2003	22 October 2005	Workers' Party of Korea	Kim Jong Il	11th
(6)		Ri Yong-mu 리용무 (1925–2022)	3 September 2003	9 April 2009	Workers' Party of Korea	Kim Jong Il	11th
8		Kim Yong-chun 김영춘 (1936–2018)	11 April 2007	9 April 2009	Workers' Party of Korea	Kim Jong Il	11th
9		O Kuk-ryol 오극렬 (1930–2023)	19 February 2009	9 April 2009	Workers' Party of Korea	Kim Jong Il	11th
(8)		Kim Yong-chun 김영춘 (1936–2018)	9 April 2009	9 April 2014	Workers' Party of Korea	Kim Jong Il (until 2011) Vacant (2011–2012) Kim Jong Un (from 2012)	12th
(6)		Ri Yong-mu 리용무 (1925–2022)	9 April 2009	9 April 2014	Workers' Party of Korea	Kim Jong Il (until 2011) Vacant (2011–2012) Kim Jong Un (from 2012)	12th
(9)		O Kuk-ryol 오극렬 (1930–2023)	9 April 2009	9 April 2014	Workers' Party of Korea	Kim Jong Il (until 2011) Vacant (2011–2012) Kim Jong Un (from 2012)	12th
10		Jang Song-thaek 장성택 (1946–2013)	7 June 2010	8 December 2013	Workers' Party of Korea	Kim Jong Il (until 2011) Vacant (2011–2012) Kim Jong Un (from 2012)	12th
11		Choe Ryong-hae 최룡해 (born 1950)	9 April 2014	25 September 2014	Workers' Party of Korea	Kim Jong Un	13th
(6)		Ri Yong-mu 리용무 (1925–2022)	9 April 2014	29 June 2016	Workers' Party of Korea	Kim Jong Un	13th
(9)		O Kuk-ryol 오극렬 (1930–2023)	9 April 2014	29 June 2016	Workers' Party of Korea	Kim Jong Un	13th
12		Hwang Pyong-so 황병서 (born 1949)	25 September 2014	29 June 2016	Workers' Party of Korea	Kim Jong Un	13th

==== State Affairs Commission ====
No.	Portrait	Name (Birth–Death)	Term of office		Party	President	SPA
No.	Portrait	Name (Birth–Death)	Took office	Left office	Party	President	SPA
(11)		Choe Ryong-hae 최룡해 (born 1950)	29 June 2016	11 April 2019	Workers' Party of Korea	Kim Jong Un	13th
(12)		Hwang Pyong-so 황병서 (born 1949)	29 June 2016	11 April 2018	Workers' Party of Korea	Kim Jong Un	13th
13		Pak Pong-ju 박봉주 (born 1939)	29 June 2016	11 April 2019	Workers' Party of Korea	Kim Jong Un	13th
(13)		Pak Pong-ju 박봉주 (born 1939)	11 April 2019	29 September 2021	Workers' Party of Korea	Kim Jong Un	14th
14		Kim Tok-hun 김덕훈 (born 1961)	29 September 2021	22 March 2026	Workers' Party of Korea	Kim Jong Un	14th
15		Pak Thae-song 박태성 (born 1955)	22 March 2026	Incumbent	Workers' Party of Korea	Kim Jong Un	15th
