= Kim To-man =

North Korean politician (fl. 20th century)

Kim To-man (Korean: 김도만) was a faction member of the Kapsan faction, and the Director of the Propaganda and Agitation Department (PAD) of North Korea, but removed from office by Kim Il Sung.

== Career ==
Kim To-man was a faction member of the Kapsan faction, whose ringleader, Pak Kum-chol sought to introduce economic reforms, challenge Kim Il Sung's cult of personality, and appoint himself as Kim Il Sung's successor. Without Kim Il Sung's approval, Kim produced work called An Act of Sincerity – described variously as either a film or a stage play – that honored the feats of Pak and his wife as members of the Kapsan Operation Committee and the life of Pak. Kim also had Pak's birthplace rebuilt.

Kim, was a key supporter of Kim Yong-ju, the younger brother of Kim Il Sung, who fought with Kim Jong Il over being heir apparent. Kim Yong-ju, having studied in Russia, supported a more classical view of Marxism and was not fond of the extensive personality cult built around his brother.

Since Kim had published An Act of Sincerity, Kim was forced to leave his office as director of the Propaganda and Agitation Department. Kim Jong Il probably helped in Kim To-man's purge. After this and related purges, the PAD shaped the societal landscape of North Korea to allow Kim Il Sung to cement his rule and become the supreme leader of North Korea.
