= Ro Song-sil =

North Korean politician (born 1960)

- Born: 1960 (age 64–65); North Korea

Korean name
- Hangul: 로성실
- Hanja: 盧成實
- RR: Ro Seongsil
- MR: Ro Sŏngsil

Ro Song-sil (Korean: 로성실; born 1960) is a North Korean politician. She has served as the chairwoman of the Central Committee of the Korean Democratic Women's Union (KDWU) and as a member of the 6th Central Committee of the Workers' Party of Korea. She was a delegate to the 12th Supreme People's Assembly and a member of the Presidium.

She was removed from her position as head of the KDWU in February 2014, at the union's 66th general meeting. She had been regarded as a protégé of the executed Jang Song-thaek.

== Career ==
A graduate of Kim Il Sung University, Ro became vice-chair of the Pyongyang committee of the Women's Union in April 2001, and chair of that committee in February 2002. After serving as vice chair of the Central Committee of the KDWU starting in November 2006, in March 2008 she became chair of the union (at the 52nd general meeting of the KDWU).

== Delegate to Supreme People's Assembly ==
Ro was elected to the 12th session of the Supreme People's Assembly in April 2009, and to the SPA Presidium at the same time.

== Other activities ==
Ro was a member of the national mourning committees for the deaths of Pak Song-chol in 2008, Hong Song-nam in 2009, Kim Jung-rin in 2010, and Kim Jong Il in 2011.

== See also ==
- Kim Kyong-hui
- Kim Song-hye
- Kim Sul-song
- Kim Yo Jong
- Politics of North Korea
- Women in North Korea
