= Kim Ki-nam (politician) =

North Korean official (1929–2024)

Director of the Propaganda and Agitation Department of the Workers' Party of Korea
- In office April 1989 – 9 October 2017
- Deputy: Ri Jae-il; Kim Yo Jong
- Leader: Kim Il Sung; Kim Jong Il; Kim Jong Un
- Preceded by: ?
- Succeeded by: Pak Kwang-ho

Personal details
- Born: 28 August 1929 Kumya County, Kankyōnan Province, Korea, Empire of Japan
- Died: 7 May 2024 (aged 94) Ponghwa Clinic, Pyongyang, North Korea
- Resting place: Patriotic Martyrs' Cemetery
- Party: Workers' Party of Korea

Korean name
- Hangul: 김기남
- Hanja: 金己男; 金基南
- RR: Gim Ginam
- MR: Kim Kinam

Kim Ki-nam (Korean: 김기남; 28 August 1929 – 7 May 2024) was a North Korean official. He served as Vice Chairman (previously Secretary) of the Workers' Party of Korea, and Director of the Propaganda and Agitation Department from 1989 until 2017, responsible for coordinating the country's press, media, fine arts, and publishing to support government policy. He was also a vice-chairman of the Committee for the Peaceful Reunification of the Fatherland, in which capacity he led numerous visits to the South, and served several terms in the Supreme People's Assembly, to which he was first elected in November 1977.

== Biography ==
Kim Ki-nam was born in Anda, Heilongjiang, China on 28 August 1929.

A graduate from the Kim Il Sung University and Soviet party schools, at first he worked in foreign affairs (being North Korea's ambassador to Beijing in the early 1950s) before moving to the Propaganda and Agitation Department where he became deputy director in 1966. In 1974, he was appointed editor of the Party's theoretical magazine, Kulloja, and in 1976 he was promoted to editor-in-chief of Rodong Sinmun. He is credited with having produced articles and essays creating the cult of Kim Jong Il and praising Kim Il Sung's historic role. He was elected to the 6th Central Committee at the 6th Party Congress in October 1980, director of the Propaganda and Agitation Department in April 1985 and simultaneously secretary for propaganda and party history in 1992.

Kim Ki-nam was the party's propaganda boss and key author of the country's political slogans during Kim Jong Il's regime. He was given a role in ensuring Kim Jong Un's succession drive and appointed to the 6th Politburo in September 2010.

He was one of the very few North Korean officials to have visited South Korea, leading a funeral delegation in 2009 after the death of president Kim Dae-jung.

He was also one of the only two civilian officials who accompanied Kim Jong Il's coffin during his funeral in December 2011, the other being Choe Thae-bok.

He was given a seat in the State Affairs Commission in June 2016 when it was established. He was replaced in October 2017 by Pak Kwang-ho in all his functions at a Central Committee plenum due to his retirement.

In 2016, he was placed under sanctions by the United States government.

Kim was hospitalized with multiple organ failure in April 2022, and died on 7 May 2024 at the age of 94.

== Works ==
- Kim Ki-nam (February 1989). "Fundamental Changes Brought About in Party Ideological Work Under the Banner of Converting the Whole Society to the Chuche Ideology" (PDF). Kulloja (2). OCLC 9516938.

== Links ==
- Photo of grave

== See also ==
- Politics of North Korea
