= Jo Yong-won =

North Korean politician (born 1957)

- 조용원
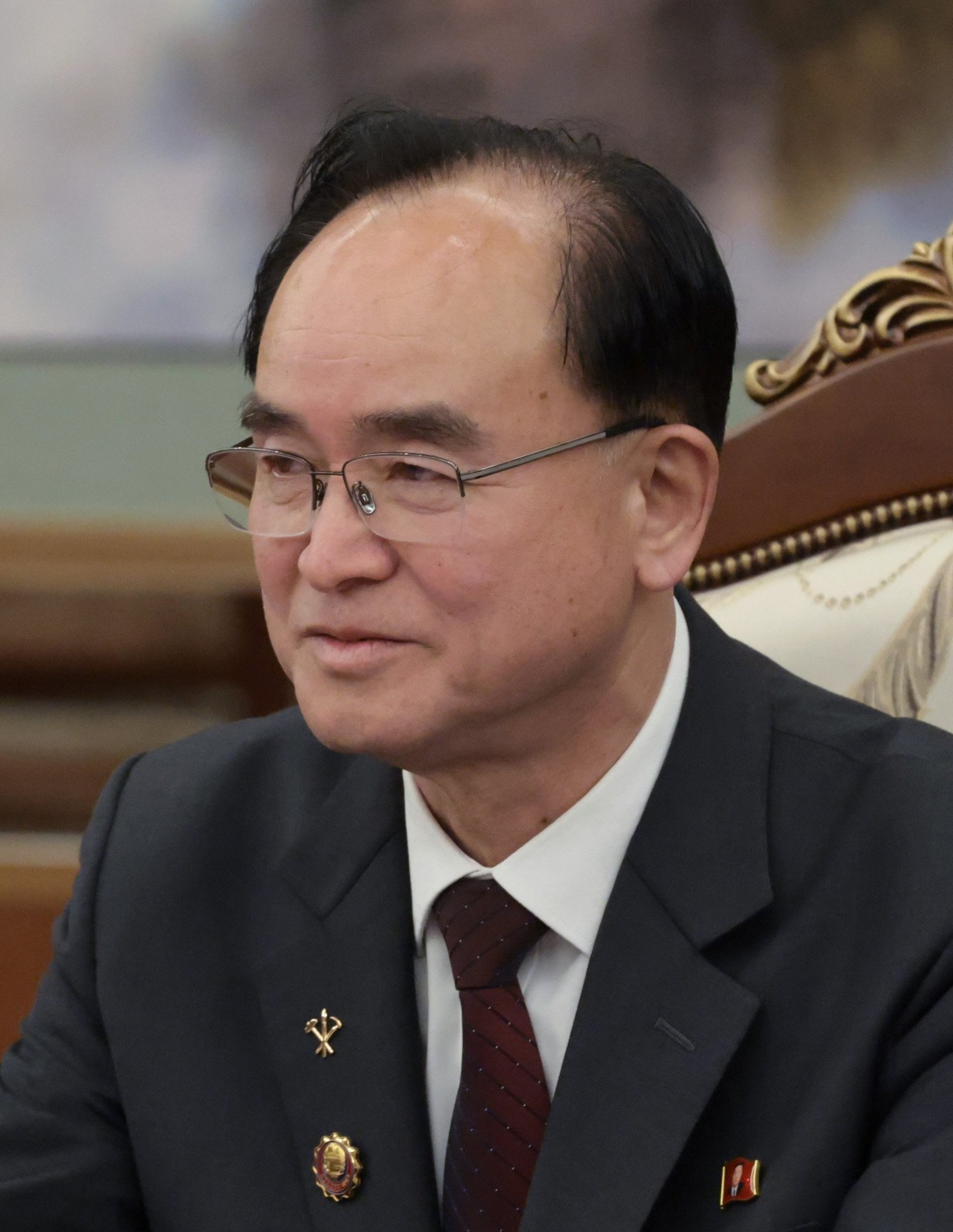
- Jo in 2026

Chairman of the Standing Committee of the Supreme People's Assembly
- In office 22 March 2026 – 20 June 2026
- Leader: Kim Jong Un
- Vice Chairpersons: Kim Hyong-sik; Ri Son-gwon
- Preceded by: Choe Ryong-hae
- Succeeded by: TBD

Chairman of the Supreme People's Assembly
- In office 22 March 2026 – 20 June 2026
- Preceded by: Pak In-chol

First Vice President of the State Affairs Commission
- Incumbent
- Assumed office 22 March 2026
- President: Kim Jong Un
- Preceded by: Choe Ryong-hae

Personal details
- Born: 1957 (age 68–69) North Korea
- Party: Workers' Party of Korea

Korean name
- Hangul: 조용원
- RR: Jo Yongwon
- MR: Cho Yongwŏn

Jo Yong-won (Korean: 조용원, born 1957) is a North Korean politician who is deputy chief of the Workers' Party of Korea (WPK)'s Secretariat of General Secretary Kim Jong Un. From March until June 2026, he was also the Chairman of the Supreme People's Assembly, North Korea's unicameral parliament, and the Chairman of its Standing Committee.

== Biography ==
He was a vice director of the WPK Organization and Guidance Department (OGD). Jo was also a full member of the 7th Central Committee of the WPK since it was elected at the 7th Congress of the WPK in May 2016. Jo has been a member of the Presidium of the Politburo, and a secretary of the Secretariat of the WPK since it was elected at the 8th WPK Central Committee in January 2021. Jo appears to serve as the First Secretary of the Workers' Party of Korea making him formally the principal day-to-day leader of the party second only to Kim Jong Un.

Jo is a confidant of the country's leader, Kim Jong Un, and accompanies him often on guidance tours, mostly in relation to the economy. In 2016 he was the most frequent member of Kim's entourage.

According to NK News, Jo was "once described as a 'rising star' of DPRK politics [and] remains one of the country's most important officials." Jo is often featured in North Korean media; in 2018 his name was mentioned more often than that of any other official except Kim Jong Un.

In March 2021 in Pyongyang, Jo "sharply censured the shortcomings" of WPK city and county level cadre, calling out their "deviations of failing to properly apply our Party's people-first politics."

In March 2026 during the session of the 15th convocation of the Supreme People's Assembly he was appointed chairman of its standing committee as well as Chairman of the Assembly. On June 2026 in an unexpected move, during the expanded session of the 2nd Plenary Meeting of the 9th Central Committee of the Workers' Party of Korea, held for three days starting on the 20th, Kim Jong-un proposed recalling Jo from his position as chairman of the standing committee and chairman of the assembly of the Supreme People's Assembly, and electing him as a secretary of the WPK Central Committee for organization matters which was unanimously approved, returning to lead the Organization and Guidance Department. His abruptly departure from that position presumably occurred due to a corruption scandal in the General Political Bureau of the Korean People's Army involving Pak Hui-chol.

== Sanctions and travel ban ==
In January 2017, the United States Department of the Treasury sanctioned Jo for his involvement in the censorship activities of the OGD. In June 2017, Jo was singled out in Annex 1 of United Nations Security Council Resolution 2356, which placed an international travel ban and asset freeze on him.
