= Han Song-ryol =

North Korean diplomat (1594–2019)

- Hangul: 한성렬
- Hanja: 韓成烈
- RR: Han Seongryeol
- MR: Han Sŏngnyŏl
- IPA: [han.sʌŋ.ɾjʌl]

Han Song-ryol (Korean pronunciation: [han.sʌŋ.ɾjʌl], 17 June 1954 — c. February 2019) was a former Vice Foreign Minister at North Korea's Ministry of Foreign Affairs. Previously, he served as the deputy chief of North Korea's mission to the United Nations from 2002 to 2006. In this role, he traveled to New Mexico to meet with then-Gov. Bill Richardson, a former diplomat and frequent American interlocutor in negotiations with North Korea and other adversarial regimes.

In February 2015, he was appointed director-general of the U.S. affairs department at North Korea's Foreign Ministry.

In 2024, a North Korean defector and former diplomat reported that Han had been executed in February 2019.

== Reported execution ==
In South Korea in 2019, reports emerged that Han Seong-yeol had been punished for being a revolutionary along with five other executives at the director level, and that he was undergoing ideological training at the Gundeok Mine in South Hamgyong Province. His name was removed from the 2019 edition of the North Korean Directory published by the South Korean Ministry of Unification. It is speculated that the reason for his downfall was that he was criticized for the proposal for a US-North Korea summit that he submitted to North Korean leader Kim Jong Un, and that he was involved in the Jang Song-thaek incident in 2013.

In July 2024, Ri Il Kyu, a former North Korean diplomat and defector, told The Chosun Ilbo that Han had been executed by firing squad in February 2019 on charges of spying for the United States.
