= General Affairs Department of the Workers' Party of Korea =

Department of the Workers' Party of Korea

General Affairs Department of the Central Committee of the Workers' Party of Korea
- 총무부
- Emblem of the Workers' Party of Korea

Agency overview
- Headquarters: Pyongyang, North Korea
- Agency executive: Kim Yo Jong, Director
- Parent agency: Central Committee

The General Affairs Department (GAD, Korean: 조선로동당 총무부) is a department of the Central Committee of the Workers' Party of Korea (WPK) tasked with handling storage and management of party documents.

== Organization ==
Little is known about the General Affairs Department, including its leadership. According to NK News, its tasks likely "involves organizing and circulating party guidance, determining what reaches Kim Jong Un’s desk and how his directives are communicated throughout the government". The department is believed to be tasked with storage and management of party documents. It administers a document storage facility in Chagang Province.

== Leadership ==
- Thae Jong-su (2010–2012)
- Kim Pong-chol (2021-?)
- Kim Yo Jong (2026-)

== See also ==
- Office of the Politburo of the Central Committee of the SED
- General Department of the Communist Party of the Soviet Union
