= Pak Kwang-ho =

North Korean politician

Director of the Propaganda and Agitation Department of the Workers' Party of Korea
- In office 9 October 2017 – 19 January 2020
- Deputy: Kim Yo Jong
- Leader: Kim Jong Un
- Preceded by: Kim Ki-nam
- Succeeded by: Ri Il-hwan

Personal details
- Born: 1949 (age 76–77)
- Party: Workers' Party of Korea

- Pak Kwang-ho
- Hangul: 박광호
- Hanja: 朴光浩
- RR: Bak Gwangho
- MR: Pak Kwangho

Pak Kwang-ho (Korean: 박광호, born 1949) is a North Korean politician and was director of the Propaganda and Agitation Department. He was replaced by Ri Il-hwan.
