= Kim Kyong-hui =

Daughter of Kim Il Sung (born 1946)

General Kim Kyong-hui
- 김경희
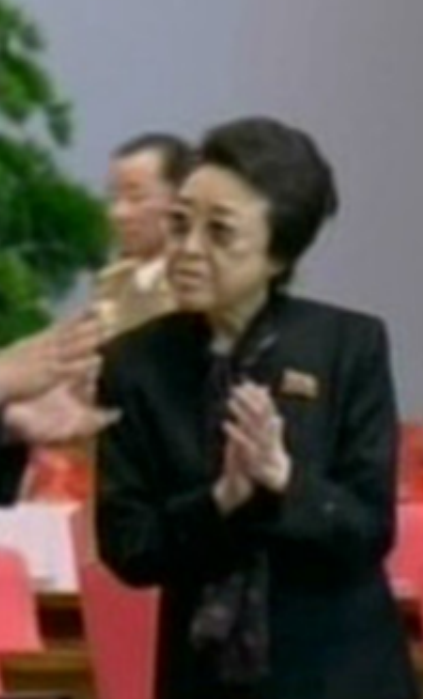
- Kim Kyong-Hui in 2013
- Born: 30 May 1946 (age 80); Pyongyang, North Korea
- Education: Kim Il Sung University; Moscow State University
- Office: Secretary for Organization of the Workers' Party of Korea; Korean People's Army general
- Political party: Workers' Party of Korea
- Spouse: Jang Song-thaek (m. 1972; died 2013)
- Children: 1
- Parents: Kim Il Sung (father); Kim Jong Suk (mother)
- Awards: Order of Kim Jong Il (2012)

Korean name
- Hangul: 김경희
- Hanja: 金慶喜/金敬姬
- RR: Gim Gyeonghui
- MR: Kim Kyŏnghŭi

Kim Kyong-hui (Korean: 김경희; born 30 May 1946) is the aunt of current North Korean leader, Kim Jong Un. She is the daughter of the founding North Korean leader Kim Il Sung and the sister of the late leader Kim Jong Il. She currently serves as Secretary for Organization of the Workers' Party of Korea. An important member of Kim Jong Il's inner circle of trusted friends and advisors, she was director of the WPK Light Industry Department from 1988 to 2012. She was married to Jang Song-thaek, who was executed in December 2013 in Pyongyang, after being charged with treason and corruption.

== Early life and education ==
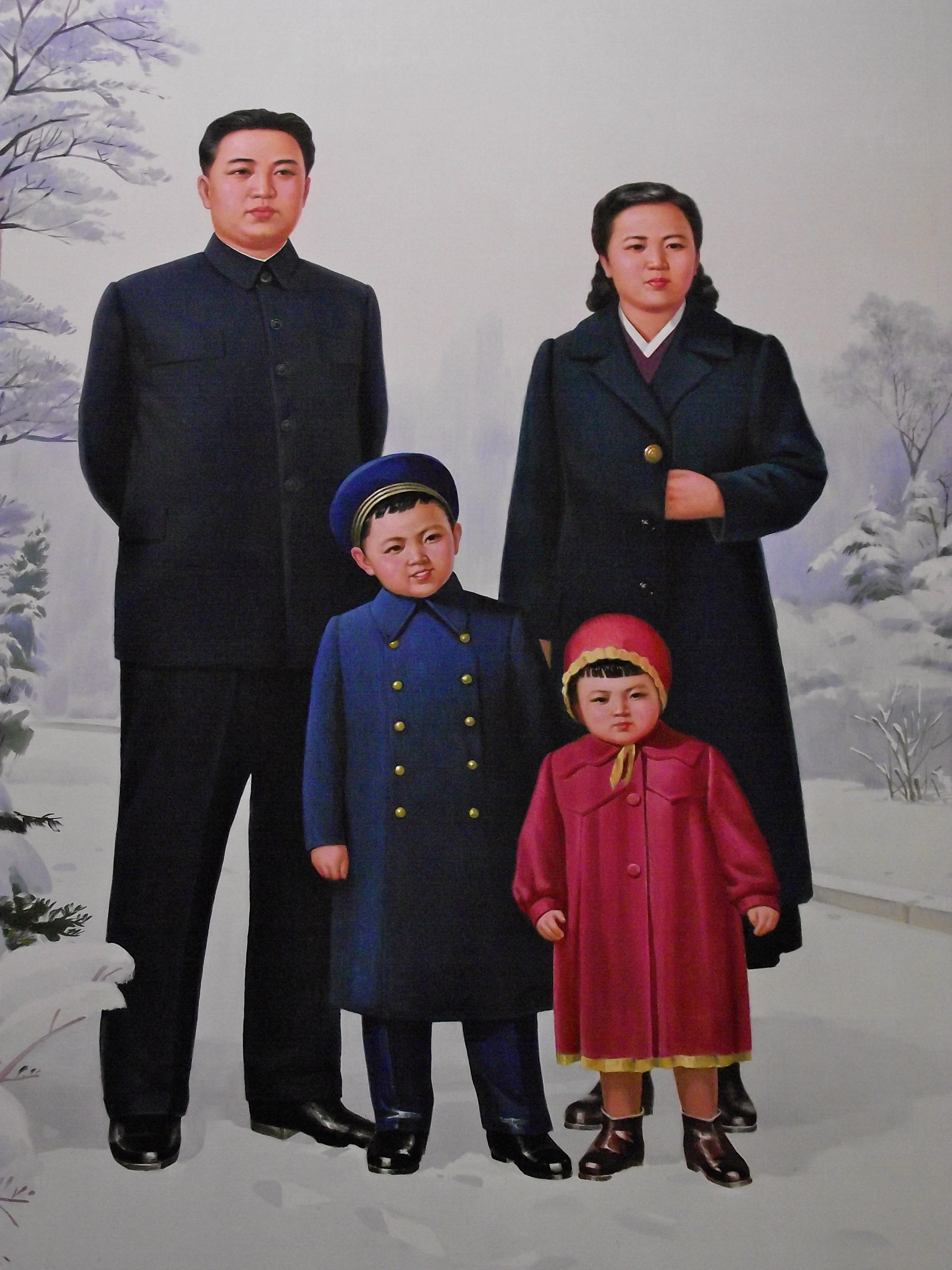
A portrait of Kim Kyong-hui with her mother Kim Jong Suk, father Kim Il Sung and brother Kim Jong Il

Kim was born in Pyongyang on 30 May 1946 to Kim Il Sung and Kim Jong Suk. Her mother died when she was four. After her father remarried, she was raised by various surrogates away from the family.

After a brief period spent in Jilin Province, China due to the Korean War, Kim returned to Pyongyang with her brother, Kim Jong Il. She entered Kim Il Sung University in 1963, studying political economy. Kim attended the Kim Il Sung Higher Party School in 1966, and went to study at Moscow State University in 1968.

== Career ==
Kim's political career began in 1971 with a position in the Korean Democratic Women's Union, and in 1975 she was transferred to the post of vice-director of the International Liaison Department of the Workers' Party of Korea, promoted to first vice-director in 1976. It was the period when North Korea was establishing diplomatic relations with a number of capitalist countries, like Thailand and Singapore, as well as the United Nations. She oversaw the placement of qualified diplomatic personnel during her tenure as International Department vice-director.

In 1988, Kim was promoted to WPK Central Committee member and director of the Light Industry Department. In 1990, she was elected deputy to the Supreme People's Assembly for the first time. Her role was particularly significant as she led the Economic Policy Inspection Department, then again the Light Industry Department during the "Arduous March" period after Kim Il Sung's death.

The Kim family tree (DPRK)

Na Hyeon-Jik	Kim Song-Ryeong
Lady Lee	Kim Ŭngu
Yi Poik	Kim Pohyŏn
Kang Pan Sok	Kim Hyong-jik	Kim Hyong-gwon
Kim Song-ae	Kim Il Sung	Kim Jong-suk	Kim Yong-ju
Kim Pyong-il	Kim Jong Il	Kim Kyong-hui	Kim Man-il

Kim disappeared from the limelight in 2003, in the same period when Jang Song-thaek was apparently purged as well. However, while her husband resurfaced with a high-level position in 2007, she did not appear in public until 2009, playing a more and more prominent role, accompanying Kim Jong Il to several inspection tours and attending official events. On 27 September 2010, it was announced that she was made a general in the Korean People's Army, the first woman in North Korea to achieve this military rank. This coincided with her nephew Kim Jong Un's promotion to the same rank. A day later, the 3rd Conference of the Workers' Party elected her as a member of the Political Bureau, which is the central organization of the party. Kim Kyong-hui later continued to pose as a prominent member of the North Korean leadership under Kim Jong Un. Kim was elected member of the WPK Secretariat and a leading figure of the WPK Organization and Guidance Department (the foremost party department led by her uncle Kim Yong-ju until 1974, and by Kim Jong Il himself from 1974 till his death) at the 4th Party Conference in April 2012.

According to South Korean sources, Kim also worked as Kim Jong Il's personal aide. Her influential position in North Korean echelons (also confirmed by Kenji Fujimoto) allowed her to maintain close relations with president Kim Yong-nam of the SPA Presidium, WPK Secretaries Choe Thae-bok and Kim Ki-nam, and Director Kim Yang-gon of the WPK United Front Department. Her post as head of the Light Industry Department gave her a prominent role in shaping North Korean economic policy as it was shifting its focus on developing light industry.

In 2010, Kim opened the first hamburger restaurant in Pyongyang.

== Personal life ==
Kim met her future husband, Jang Song-thaek, when she was studying at Kim Il Sung University. She and Jang continued dating after he relocated to Wonsan, allegedly because the Kim family opposed their relationship. The two eventually married in 1972.

Kim and Jang had a daughter, Jang Kum-song (1977–2006), who lived overseas in Paris as an international student; she refused an order to return to Pyongyang and then reportedly committed suicide in September 2006 due to her parents' opposition to her relationship with her boyfriend.

In the 2010s, Kim Kyong-hui was rumored to be either dead or very ill. According to a report by the Daily NK in August 2012, she has suffered from ill health due to alcoholism. According to Paul Fischer, she has suffered from this disease every so often since at least the late 1970s. This has prompted at least one trip into China for rehabilitation. It was suggested that she had a fatal stroke or a heart attack. Some reports claimed she had committed suicide. According to other reports, she underwent surgery for a brain tumour in 2013 and was left in a vegetative state.

On 8 December 2013, Jang was publicly expelled from the ruling Workers' Party of Korea. Jang was accused of factionalism, corruption, and a range of misbehaviour that included affairs with other women. On 13 December, it was reported that he had been executed for treason.

On 14 December, the Korean Central News Agency released a roster of six top officials appointed to a national committee in charge of organizing a state funeral for Kim Kuk-tae, a former Workers' Party official. The roster included the name of Kim Kyong-hui, indicating she had survived the purge and remained in favour. The status of Kim Kyong-hui's relationship with Jang had been a subject of frequent speculation. Analysts believe that Jang and Kim Kyong-hui had been estranged. Yoon Sang-hyun, a National Assembly of South Korea deputy floor leader of the governing Saenuri Party, said that Kim had been "separated" from Jang and did not oppose his purge.

In 2015, an unnamed source, described as a high-ranking defector, claimed that Kim Jong Un had ordered Kim Kyong-hui to be poisoned. In February 2015 the South Korean National Intelligence Service stated she was still alive. In 2016, historical footage of her was aired on North Korean television, indicating that she had not been removed from official history. In 2017, the South Korean Yonhap News Agency reported that she was alive but receiving medical treatment.

In January 2020, Kim appeared in North Korean media for the first time in over six years, attending a Lunar New Year concert with Kim Jong Un.

== See also ==
- Kim Song-hye
- Kim Sol-song
- Kim Yo Jong
- Politics of North Korea
- Ro Song-sil
- Women in North Korea

== Bibliography ==
- Baird, Merrily (2003). Kim Chong-il's Erratic Decision-Making and North Korea's Strategic Culture. In Barry R. Schneider & Jerrold M. Post (eds.), Thy Enemy: Profiles of Adversary Leaders and Their Strategic Cultures. USAF Counterproliferation Center: Publications, Research, & Education, WMD NBC counterproliferation electives syllabi; retrieved 19 September 2010.
- Mansourov, Alexandre. (2004). Inside North Korea's black box: reversing the optics. The Brookings Institution; retrieved 19 September 2010.
- Madden, Michael (2010). Biographical Sketch of Kim Kyong-hui. North Korea Leadership Watch; retrieved 19 September 2010.

Party political offices
Preceded by Kim Jong Il	Director of the Organization and Guidance Department; 2011–2012	Succeeded by Kim Jong Un

Select (Note: To keep the tree of manageable size, it omits five out of the seven known legitimate children of Kim Il Sung. Other children not shown in the tree are: Kim Man-il (1944–1947; child of Kim Jong-suk), Kim Kyong-jin (born 1952; child of Kim Song-ae), Kim Yong-il (1955–2000; child of Kim Song-ae), and Kim Kyong-suk (born 1951; child of Kim Song-ae). A stillborn daughter is also omitted. Kim Il Sung was reported to have had other children with women who he was not married to; they included Kim Hyŏn-nam (born 1972). Also, only some of the descendants of Kim Jong Il and Kim Jong Un (Kim Il Sung's successors) are included.) family tree of North Korea's ruling Kim family (Note: Korean names often have a variety of transliterations into English, which can be confusing. For example, "Kim Jong Chul" may also be written "Gim Jeong-cheol" or "Kim Jŏng-ch'ŏl" among many other variations. See Korean romanization for more information.) (Note: Huss, Kan; Frost, Clay. "North Korea's First Family: Mapping the personal and political drama of the Kim clan". msnbc.com. Archived from the original on 4 February 2012. (Confirms many, but not all, of the birth and death years. See individual articles for more references.))

Kim Song-ryeong; 1810–1899
Kim Ŭngu; 1848–1878
Kim Pohyŏn; 1871–1955
Kim Hyong-jik; 1894–1926	Kang Pan Sok; 1892–1932
Kim Jong-suk; 1917–1949	Kim Il Sung; 1912–1994	Kim Song-ae; 1924–2014	Kim Yong-ju; 1920–2021
Kim Young-sook; 1947–	Song Hye-rim; 1937–2002	Kim Jong Il; 1941? (Note: Official North Korean biographies of Kim Jong Il list his birth year as 1942. The Korean calendar is based upon the Chinese zodiac which is believed to characterize one's personality. The year 1942 (Year of the Horse), in addition to being 30 years since Kim Il Sung's birth may be viewed as a better year than others, thus creating a motive to lie about a birth year.)–2011	Ko Yong-hui; 1952–2004	Kim Ok; 1964–	Kim Kyong-hui; 1946–	Jang Song-thaek; 1946–2013	Kim Pyong Il; 1954–
Kim Sol-song; 1974–	Kim Jong-nam; 1971–2017	Kim Jong Chul; 1981–	Kim Jong Un; 1983? (Note: Official North Korean biographies of Kim Jong Un list his birth year as 1982. The Korean calendar is based upon the Chinese zodiac which is believed to characterize one's personality. The year 1982 (Year of the Dog), in addition to being 70 years since Kim Il Sung's birth, may be viewed as a better year than others, thus creating a motive to lie about a birth year.)–	Ri Sol-ju c. 1986–	Kim Yo Jong; 1987–
Kim Han-sol; 1995–	Kim Ju Ae c. 2012 (Note: Birth year for Kim Ju Ae is not publicly known. She may have been born in either late 2012 or early 2013.)–
