= Kwak Pom-gi =

North Korean government official (born 1939)

- Born: 20 November 1939 (age 86); Riwon County, South Hamgyong Province, North Korea
- Education: Kim Il Sung University
- Organization(s): Politburo alternate member and director of the Party Finance and Accounting Department in April 2012, and chairman of the Supreme People's Assembly Budget Committee in 2012
- Political party: Workers' Party of Korea

Korean name
- Hangul: 곽범기
- Hanja: 郭範基
- RR: Gwak Beomgi
- MR: Kwak Pŏmgi

Kwak Pom-gi (Korean: 곽범기; born 20 November 1939) is a North Korean government official.

After graduating from Huichon Industrial College, he began his career in 1983 as a machine factory manager, progressing through the machinery bureau of the Workers' Party of Korea, becoming an alternate member of the party's 6th Central Committee in 1993. He has been Vice Premier of North Korea from 1998 to 2010, and is a member of the Secretariat of the Workers' Party of Korea. He is described as a "technocrat" in the North Korean leadership.

In October 2003, Kwak gave a speech celebrating the Ryugyong Jong Ju Yong Indoor Stadium at the Mansudae Art Theatre, which is an indoor stadium built on the bank of the River Potong.

In August 2006, Kwak, with Russian Ambassador Andrei Karlov, was at the opening of the first Russian Orthodox Church in Pyongyang, North Korea. The church was opened to improve the development of Russian–North Korean relations according to Korean Orthodox Church Committee Chairman Ho Il Jin. The North Korean government would "successfully administer" the church, which was built to hold 500 people.

On 6 January 2007, at a mass rally in Pyongyang which included Kim Jong Il, he gave a speech praising the North Korean government for building nuclear weapons. He also addressed the country's "problem of food scarcity" in 2007, saying, "The Cabinet will concentrate state efforts on agriculture this year, too, considering it a mainstay, to thoroughly implement the WPK's policy of agriculture revolution and make a signal advance in the efforts to settle the people's food problem."

He served as WPK South Hamgyong provincial secretary from 2010, where he led an effort to develop local industry which was celebrated as "flames of Hamnam". Likely as a result of this, he was elevated to Politburo alternate member and director of the Party Finance and Accounting Department in April 2012, and chairman of the Supreme People's Assembly Budget Committee in September of the same year. He has been speculated as the head of the new Party Economy Department, reportedly established in June 2013.
