= Choe Thae-bok =

North Korean politician (1930–2024)

- 최태복
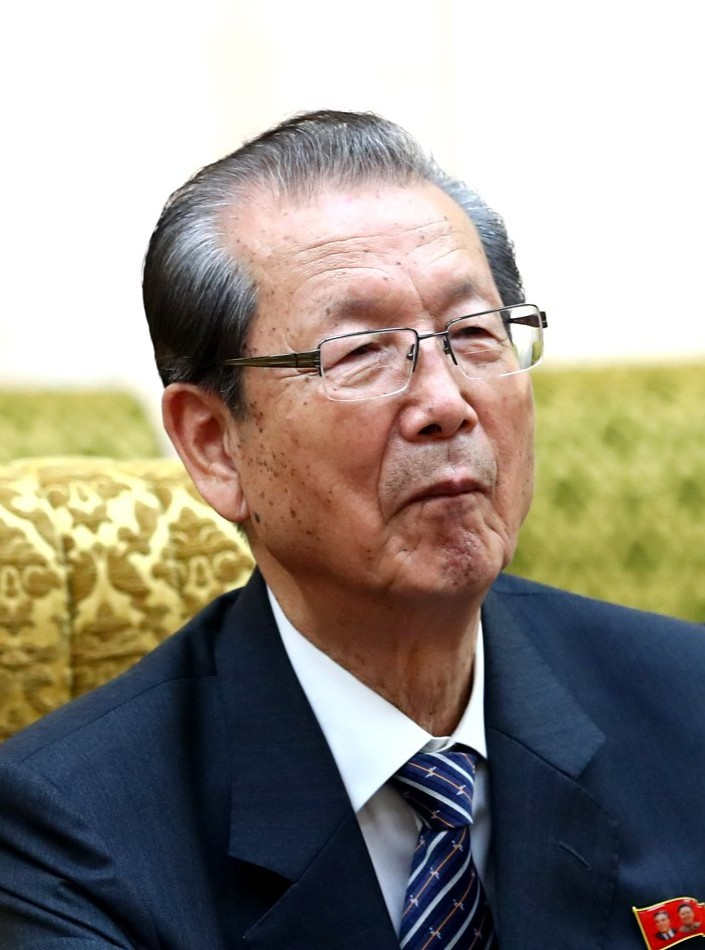
- Choe in 2018

Chairman of the Supreme People's Assembly
- In office 5 September 1998 – 11 April 2019
- Preceded by: Han Duk-su
- Succeeded by: Pak Thae-song

Personal details
- Born: 1 December 1930 Namp'o, Korea, Empire of Japan
- Died: 20 January 2024 (aged 93) Pyongyang, North Korea
- Party: Workers' Party of Korea
- Education: Mangyongdae Revolutionary School
- Alma mater: Kim Il Sung University

Korean name
- Hangul: 최태복
- Hanja: 崔泰福
- RR: Choe Taebok
- MR: Ch'oe T'aebok

Choe Thae-bok (Korean: 최태복; 1 December 1930 – 20 January 2024) was a North Korean politician. He was a member of the Politburo and the Secretariat of the Workers' Party of Korea, and was chairman (speaker) of the Supreme People's Assembly for nearly 21 years, from 1998 to 2019. He was considered an advisor to Kim Jong Il, as well as a popular member of the core leadership. He spoke fluent English, German and Russian in addition to Korean.

== Biography ==
Choe was born in Namp'o, South Pyongan Province, on 1 December 1930. He was one of the first to study at the Mangyongdae Revolutionary School; he later studied chemistry at the Kim Il Sung University, and completed his studies in Leipzig (then in East Germany) and Moscow. After his return to North Korea, he worked as a schoolteacher. In 1965 he worked at the Hamhung Chemical Engineering College as director of research of the Hamhung Branch of the Chemical Research Institute under the National Academy of Sciences, and as dean of the college in 1968. In 1972 he began working as the section chief at the WPK Education Department, becoming its vice-director in 1976.

Starting from the late 1970s, when he was appointed faculty dean and later president of the Kim Chaek University of Technology, Choe took a more prominent role in the country's politics. In the 1980s he served as chairman of the Education Commission from 1980 and Minister of Higher Education from 1981. In those capacities he expanded cultural exchanges with other countries and programs to let North Korean students study abroad. Choe was first elected as a deputy to the Supreme People's Assembly in 1982. In the same year, he led an SPA delegation to France. This was the first time he led North Korean delegations on official visits, which later included journeys to the Soviet Union, East Germany, China, and Bulgaria in 1984–1985.

In 1984, he was appointed as an alternate member of the 6th Central Committee, then full member and member of the 6th Secretariat in 1986, and 6th Politburo member in 1990. As secretary, Choe was put in charge of education, science and cultural exchanges. Choe was elected chairman of the 10th, 11th and 12th SPAs, a role that increased his involvement in foreign affairs. He also served as chairman of the Korean Committee for Solidarity with the World People from 1993 to 1998. Despite his purported reformist views, he was reputedly close to Kim Jong Il's sister Kim Kyong-hui and Vice-President Yang Hyong-sop of the SPA Presidium.

On 6 January 2007, at a mass rally in Pyongyang, he gave a speech praising the North Korean government for building nuclear weapons. On 19 October 2012, he met Zandaakhuu Enkhbold, the Mongolian parliamentary speaker, and the two countries "agreed on the future possibilities of bilateral trade and cooperation in the fields of information technology and human exchanges." Choson Sinbo, a pro-Pyongyang newspaper in Japan, said that Mongolia was interested in exporting coal, copper, gold, and uranium through Rajin Port because it was "costly to rely on Chinese and Russian railway systems." In October 2017 he retired as vice chairman of the WPK. He was then replaced as speaker of the SPA at the new legislature's first session in April 2019.

Choe died from a heart attack on 20 January 2024 in Pyongyang, at the age of 93. His death was announced by Rodong Sinmun, and KCNA reported that Kim Jong Un visited his grave.

Political offices
New title	Chairman of the Supreme People's Assembly; 1998–2019	Succeeded by Pak Thae-song
