= Propaganda and Agitation Department =

Department of the Workers' Party of Korea

Publicity and Information Department of the Central Committee of the Workers' Party of Korea
- 선전선동부
- Emblem of the Workers' Party of Korea

Agency overview
- Formed: 1945; 81 years ago
- Jurisdiction: Propaganda in North Korea
- Headquarters: Pyongyang, North Korea
- Agency executive: Ri Il-hwan, Director
- Parent agency: Central Committee

The Propaganda and Agitation Department (PAD, Korean: 조선로동당 선전선동부), (Note: PAD is the literal translation. The name 선전선동부 is a Sino-Korean reading of 宣傳煽動部, a name used to refer to this department in Chinese-language Yonhap News Agency reports. For explanation on a similarly contested translation, see Publicity Department of the Chinese Communist Party § Name.) officially translated as the Publicity and Information Department, is a department of the Central Committee of the Workers' Party of Korea (WPK) tasked with coordinating the creation and dissemination of propaganda in North Korea. It is the highest propaganda organization in the country.

The history of the department can be traced back to the Soviet Civil Administration following the division of Korea in 1945. Agitation operations by the department reached their height in the years after the Korean War. Although nominally under the Central Committee of the WPK, the department reports directly to Supreme Leader Kim Jong Un. The department has various bureaus and offices under its control.

The department sets guidelines for all propaganda materials produced and all North Korean media is overseen by it. However, in order to maintain its clandestine nature, actions relating to repression of the media are nominally attributed to the Ministry of Culture. When newspapers are published in North Korea, they go through three rounds of censorship. The first is handled by the editors of the paper. The second and third levels are taken care of by the department. The department also translates foreign works, which are censored from the public, for the use of the country's political elite.

== Organization ==
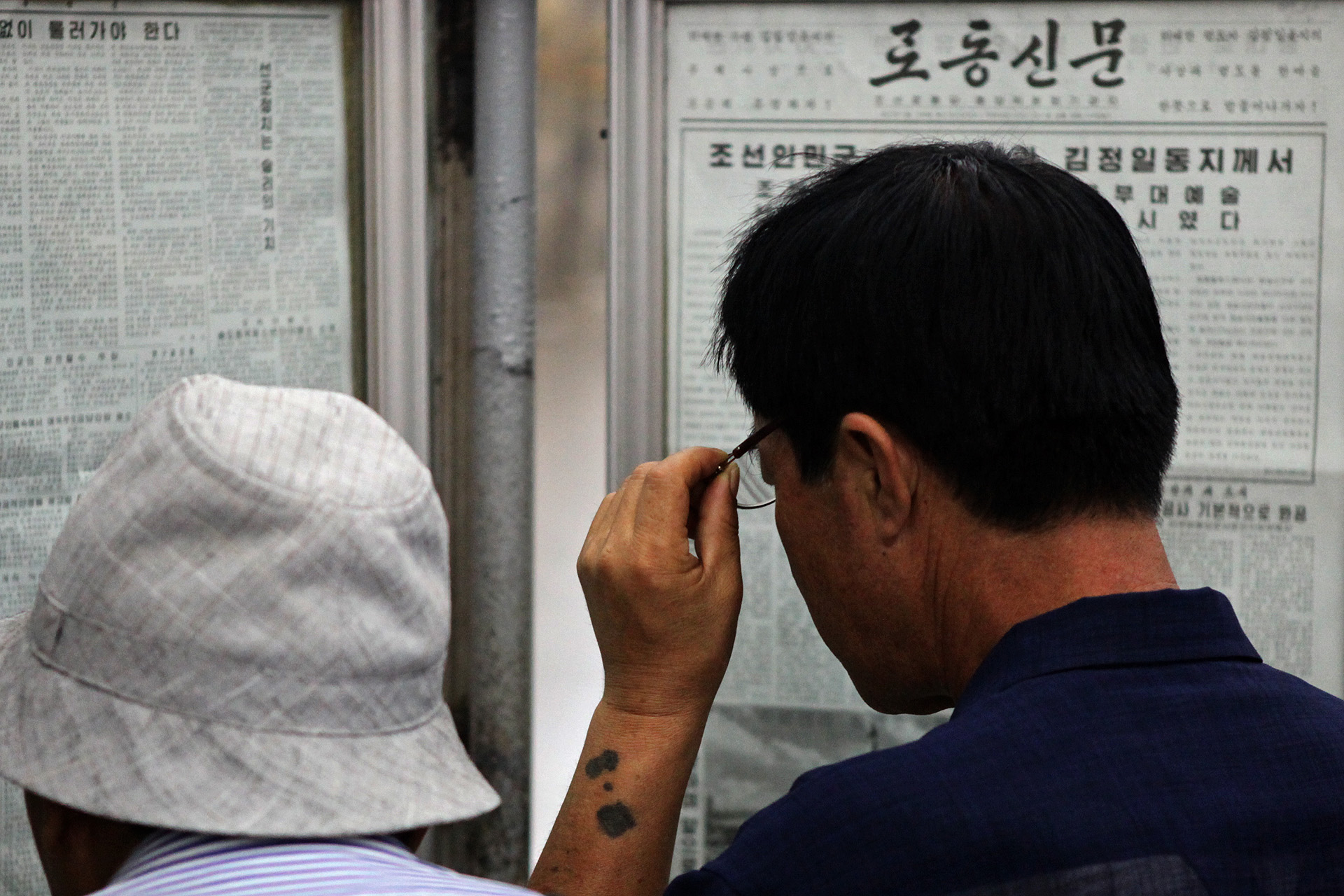
Newspapers in North Korea go through three rounds of censorship, two of which are by the PAD.

The Propaganda and Agitation Department (PAD) is under the supervision of the Secretariat of the Central Committee of the Workers' Party of Korea (WPK). It is the highest propaganda organization in the country. The PAD formulates propaganda policy, controls cultural life, and produces propaganda materials. It oversees aspects of North Korean cult of personality including the management of statues and murals of the Kim family, and the North Korea's cultural and arts sector, as well as its financial and organizational aspects. It disseminates Juche, Songun, "Strong and Prosperous Nation", and socialist ideologues and indoctrinates both party members and ordinary citizens with them. The PAD uses both formal and informal settings to achieve these goals. Because the WPK has a rich history in propaganda, the PAD is quite influential within the party structure. Along with the Organization and Guidance Department, with which it cooperates, it is one of the most important departments of the WPK. Although nominally under the Central Committee of the WPK, the PAD reports directly to Supreme Leader Kim Jong Un. The PAD's headquarters are in the center of Pyongyang. The PAD is roughly analogous to the Publicity Department of the Chinese Communist Party.

All propaganda materials are produced in accordance with guidelines set by the PAD, and all media is overseen by it. Limits set for content by the PAD are strict. The PAD controls the press in North Korea, but in order to maintain its behind-the-scenes nature, actions relating to repression of the media are often publicly attributed to the Ministry of Culture instead. When newspapers are published in North Korea, they go through three rounds of censorship. The first is handled by the editors of the paper. The second and third levels are taken care of by the PAD. Its General Bureau of Publication Guidance reviews both newspapers and other types of publications and broadcasts. The PAD's Newspaper Administration is the final level of press censorship. Likewise, radio and television broadcasts and the Korean Central News Agency are also under supervision of the PAD through the Korean Central Broadcasting Committee, to which it appoints personnel; only the Voice of National Salvation is controlled by the United Front Department of the party instead. The PAD cooperates with the Ministry of State Security and Ministry of Social Security to curtail international broadcasting into North Korea. The General Propaganda and Agitation Department of the Ministry of Defense maintains a separate structure, but the PAD cooperates with it. Other partners include the Party History Institute and the Korean Documentary Films Studio.

The PAD has numerous bureaus and offices under it. For instance, the April 15 Literary Production company is directly under the PAD and the company often supplies the department with executives. The Workers' Party of Korea Publishing House, Foreign Languages Publishing House, Workers' Publishing House, and Kumsong Youth Publishing House are also under its control. The PAD also translates otherwise forbidden foreign works for the use of the country's political elite. The Korea Film Studios and the 25 April Film Studio are under the Ministry of Culture, but the PAD controls them and their staff. It also oversees regional propaganda organizations throughout the country.

== History ==
The history of the PAD can be traced back to the Soviet Civil Administration following the division of Korea in 1945. Agitation operations by the PAD reached their height in the years after the Korean War. They included speed campaigns such as the Chollima Movement and Pyongyang Speed, labor methodologies like the Chongsan-ri Method and the Taean Work System, and the Three Revolutions Movement.

Kim To-man was the chief of the PAD until his involvement with the Kapsan faction incident that sought to oust Kim Il Sung in 1967. Kim To-man had commissioned Act of Sincerity – described variously as either a film or a stage play – about the life of Pak Kum-chol without the approval of Kim Il Sung. In North Korean society, this was an inexcusable offense, and Kim To-man was forced to go. Kim Jong Il probably helped in purging him. After this and related purges the PAD shaped the societal landscape of North Korea to allow Kim Il Sung to cement his rule and become the supreme leader of North Korea.

=== Kim Jong Il ===
Kim Jong Il had entered service of the PAD in February 1966. He was appointed the head of the PAD's Guidance Section of Culture and Art and Publication and Press section in September 1967 after a meeting in which Kim Il Sung criticized those who were associated with the Kapsan faction incident. In 1969, Kim Jong Il was promoted the deputy chief of the entire PAD. During this time, he not only designed and issued party IDs and oversaw the handling of portraits of Kim Il-sung. In practice, Kim Jong Il ran the entire department because his nominal superior Kim Kuk-tae suffered from ill health and Yang Hyong-sop, who was tasked with ideological affairs, was engaged with science and education policy instead of propaganda. In September 1973, Kim Jong Il became the chief of the PAD, a position which he held until 1985.

Kim Jong Il's years in the PAD were marked by his effort to become an expert in the field of propaganda, as well as him developing his charisma. Kim Jong Il's main contribution in the department was to devise the "monolithic ideological system", later codified as the Ten Principles for the Establishment of a Monolithic Ideological System. Kim's various efforts greatly benefited the North Korean cult of personality. During this time, the film director Choe Ik-gyu, a close confidant of his, also rose in the ranks of the PAD, becoming its vice director in 1972. Choe developed mass games that would evolve into the Arirang Festival, the organizing of which he is still overseeing. Choe fell in and out of favor repeatedly, and finally resigned from the PAD for good in 2010 after being briefly its director. The department was important because of role in mass mobilization. Kim Jong Il was known as a great fan of music, film, and theater since young age and his position within the department was natural fit.

The PAD helped to create a cultural milieu in which Kim Jong Il was named his father's successor at the Sixth Congress of the Workers' Party of Korea in 1980. When his succession became urgent in the 1990s, the PAD fabricated a convincing personal history for him because he lacked any true military credentials. He continued to influence the daily affairs of the PAD after his succession.

=== Kim Jong Un ===
Before the death of Kim Jong Il, it was already speculated that the imminent succession would employ the PAD. Kim Jong Un's sister Kim Yo Jong became the de facto leader of PAD when she was appointed its first deputy director and put in charge of "idolization projects" of Kim Jong Un. The nominal director is Pak Kwang-ho.

== Leadership ==
- Kim To-man
- Pak Chang-ok (director, 1950–1955)
- Pak Yong-bin (director, February 1950 –)
- Jong Kyong-hui (vice director, 1961 –)
- Kim Hyon-nam (director, 2002 –)
- Choe Ik-gyu (director, 2009 – February 2010)
- Kang Nung-su (director, February 2010 –)
- Jong Ha-chol (vice director)
- Ri Jae-il (former first deputy director)
- Kim Ki-nam (vice director, 1966 – October 2017)
- Pak Kwang-ho (director, October 2017 – January 2020)
- Ri Il-hwan (director, January 2020 – present)
- Kim Yo-jong (deputy department director and de facto director, November 2014 – February 2026)
- Kim Jong Il
- Kim Jong-nam

== See also ==
- Agitation Department of the SED Central Committee
- Agitprop
- Censorship in North Korea
- List of newspapers in North Korea
- List of radio stations in North Korea
- Room 39
- Television in North Korea
