= Pak Thae-song =

Premier of North Korea since 2024

- 박태성
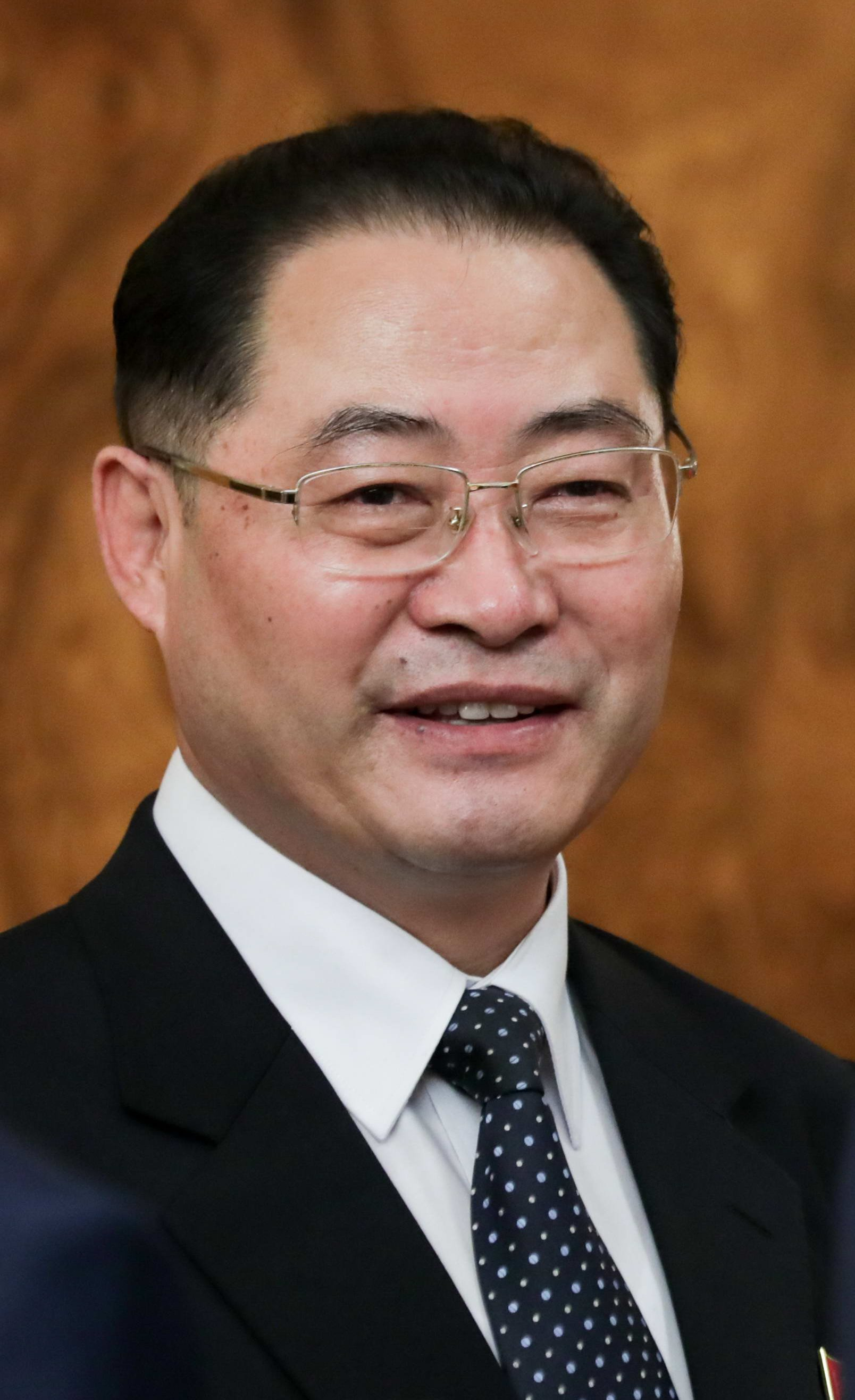
- Pak in 2019

14th Premier of North Korea
- Incumbent
- Assumed office 29 December 2024
- Supreme Leader: Kim Jong Un
- Preceded by: Kim Tok-hun

Vice President of the State Affairs Commission
- Incumbent
- Assumed office 29 December 2024
- President: Kim Jong Un

Chairman of the Supreme People's Assembly
- In office 11 April 2019 – 17 January 2023
- Preceded by: Choe Thae-bok
- Succeeded by: Pak In-chol
Other party roles
WPK Provincial Party Committee Secretary of South Pyongan Province
In office 2014–2017
| Preceded by | Hong In-bom |
| Succeeded by | Kim Tu-il |

Personal details
- Born: 14 September 1955 (age 70) North Korea
- Citizenship: North Korean
- Party: Workers' Party of Korea
- Occupation: Politician

Korean name
- Hangul: 박태성
- Hanja: 朴泰成
- RR: Bak Taeseong
- MR: Pak T'aesŏng

Pak Thae-song (Korean: 박태성, born 14 September 1955) is a North Korean politician who has served as the premier of North Korea and vice president of the State Affairs Commission since December 2024. He previously served as the chairman of the Supreme People's Assembly from January 2021 to January 2023.

== Biography ==
Pak Thae-song was born on 14 September 1955.

After serving as a member of the Central Committee of the Workers' Party of Korea, he became a candidate member of the party's politburo. In August 2012, he became vice chairman of the Central Committee of the Workers' Party of Korea. In May 2014, he became the responsible secretary of the party committee in South Pyongan Province. In May 2016, after serving as a member of the Central Committee of the Workers' Party of Korea, he became a candidate member of the Party's Politburo.

Pak became the Chairman of the Supreme People's Assembly in April 2019. He became a member of the Party Politburo and a secretary of the Party Secretariat in January 2021. In January 2023, it was confirmed that he resigned as the chairman of the Supreme People's Assembly. He became the Chairman of the National Emergency Space Science and Technology Committee in March 2023.

On 29 December 2024, Pak was appointed Premier of North Korea at the conclusion of the annual year-end general meeting of the Central Committee of the Workers' Party of Korea thereby succeeding Kim Tok-hun. On 22 March 2026, he was re-elected as premier and vice president of the State Affairs Commission.

In July 2026, Pak visited China to mark the 65th anniversary of the Treaty on Friendship, Cooperation and Mutual Assistance between China and North Korea. During the visit, he met with Chinese leader Xi Jinping.

Political offices
| Preceded by Choe Thae-bok | Chairman of the Supreme People's Assembly; April 2019 – January 2023 | Succeeded by Pak In-chol |
| Preceded by Kim Tok-hun | Premier of North Korea; December 2024 – present | Incumbent |
