= Ri Il-hwan =

North Korean politician (born 1960)

- 리일환

Director of the Propaganda and Agitation Department
- Incumbent
- Assumed office 19 January 2020
- Supreme Leader: Kim Jong Un
- Deputy: Kim Yo Jong
- Preceded by: Pak Kwang-ho

Personal details
- Born: 1960 (age 65–66) Pyongyang, North Korea
- Party: Workers' Party of Korea
- Education: Mangyongdae Revolutionary School
- Alma mater: Kim Il Sung University
- Awards: Hero of Labour

Ri Il-hwan (Korean: 리일환, born 1960) is a North Korean politician and a member of the Political Bureau of the Central Committee of the Workers' Party of Korea (WPK). He has been the Director of the Propaganda and Agitation Department (PAD) of the party since 2020.

== Early life ==
Ri Il-hwan was born in 1960 in Pyongyang. He was educated at Kim Il Sung University and the Mangyongdae Revolutionary School.

== Career ==
Ri was commander of a "Speed Campaign" for the League of Socialist Working Youth of Korea (later Kim Il Sung Socialist Youth League, KISYL) in 1992. He was elected First Secretary of the Central Committee of the KISYL at the fourteenth session of its eight plenary meeting on 23–25 November 1998, succeeding Choe Ryong-hae.

He was in charge of a KISYL delegation that visited China in March 2000. During this visit, he met with President Hu Jintao on 20 March 2000. He was also tasked with South Korean president Kim Dae-jung's visit to the Mangyongdae Children's Palace. Ri supervised the construction of the Youth Hero Motorway and opened it in October 2000. He was also present at groundbreaking ceremony of a 30,000-unit housing project near the motorway on 6 April 2001. In March 2001, Ri led a KISYL delegation that visited Thailand and Laos. He was removed from office in 2002 and was sent away for "revolutionization".

Ri's next post was in the Propaganda and Agitation Department (PAD) of the party, becoming a section chief there around 2004. From thereon until 2007, he wrote and proliferated works honoring Ko Yong Hui, wife of North Korean leader Kim Jong Il. Ri held a series of posts as section chief and deputy director in PAD and the party's General Propaganda Department, being promoted to the deputy director of PAD by 2008. In 2020, he became its full director.

In 2012, Ri became the secretary tasked with publicity and information of the Pyongyang City Committee of the WPK. He took part in numerous mass rallies and presided over various public events.

In 2014, Ri became the Director of the Workers and Social Organizations Department of the WPK, replacing Ri Yong-su, who was demoted following the purge of Jang Song-thaek. Ri Il-hwan renewed his director post at the 7th Congress of the WPK in May 2016 and was also elected member of the Central Committee of the WPK. He was appointed a Vice Chairman of the WPK and a member of the Politburo of the WPK at the fifth plenary session of the CC of the WPK on 28–31 December 2019.

Ri was first elected to the Supreme People's Assembly (SPA) in July 1998 and became a member of its Presidium in its first session in September. He was re-elected to the SPA in the 2019 election.

Ri has been awarded the title of Hero of Labor in March 2001.
