= Kim family (North Korea) =

Ruling family of North Korea

Kim family Mount Paektu Bloodline
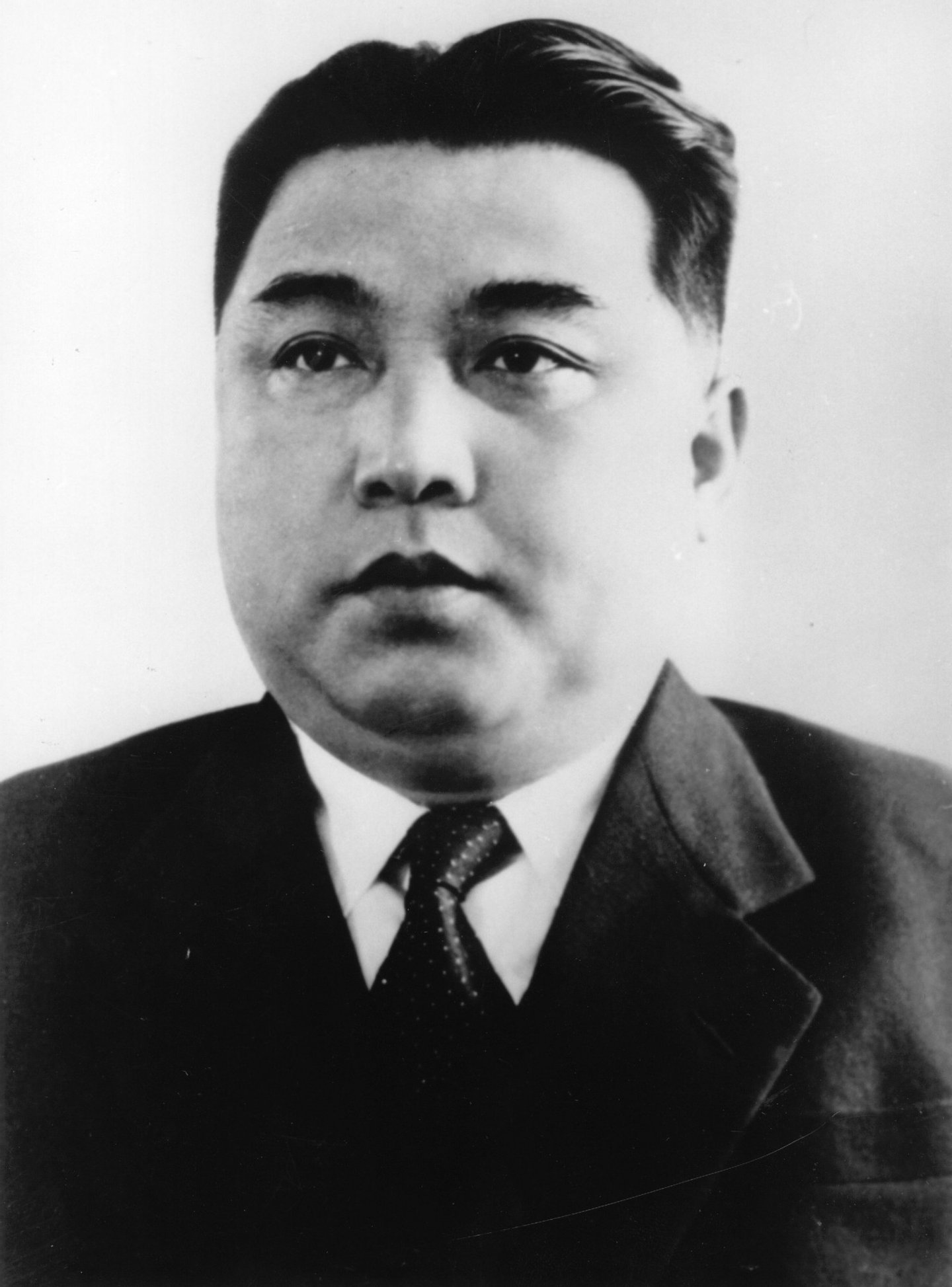
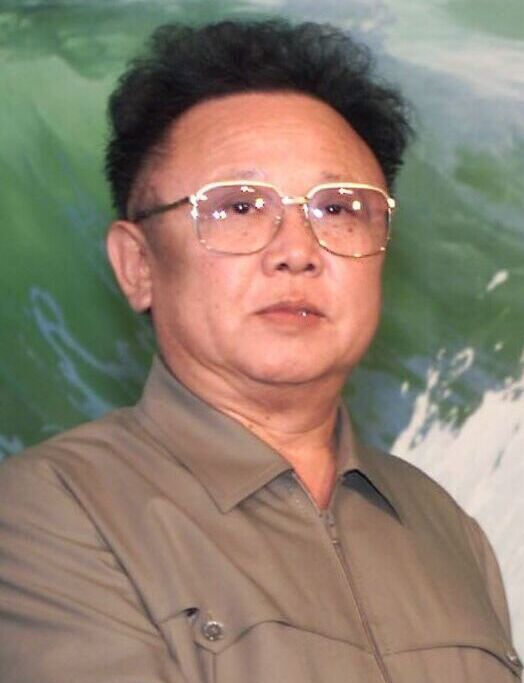
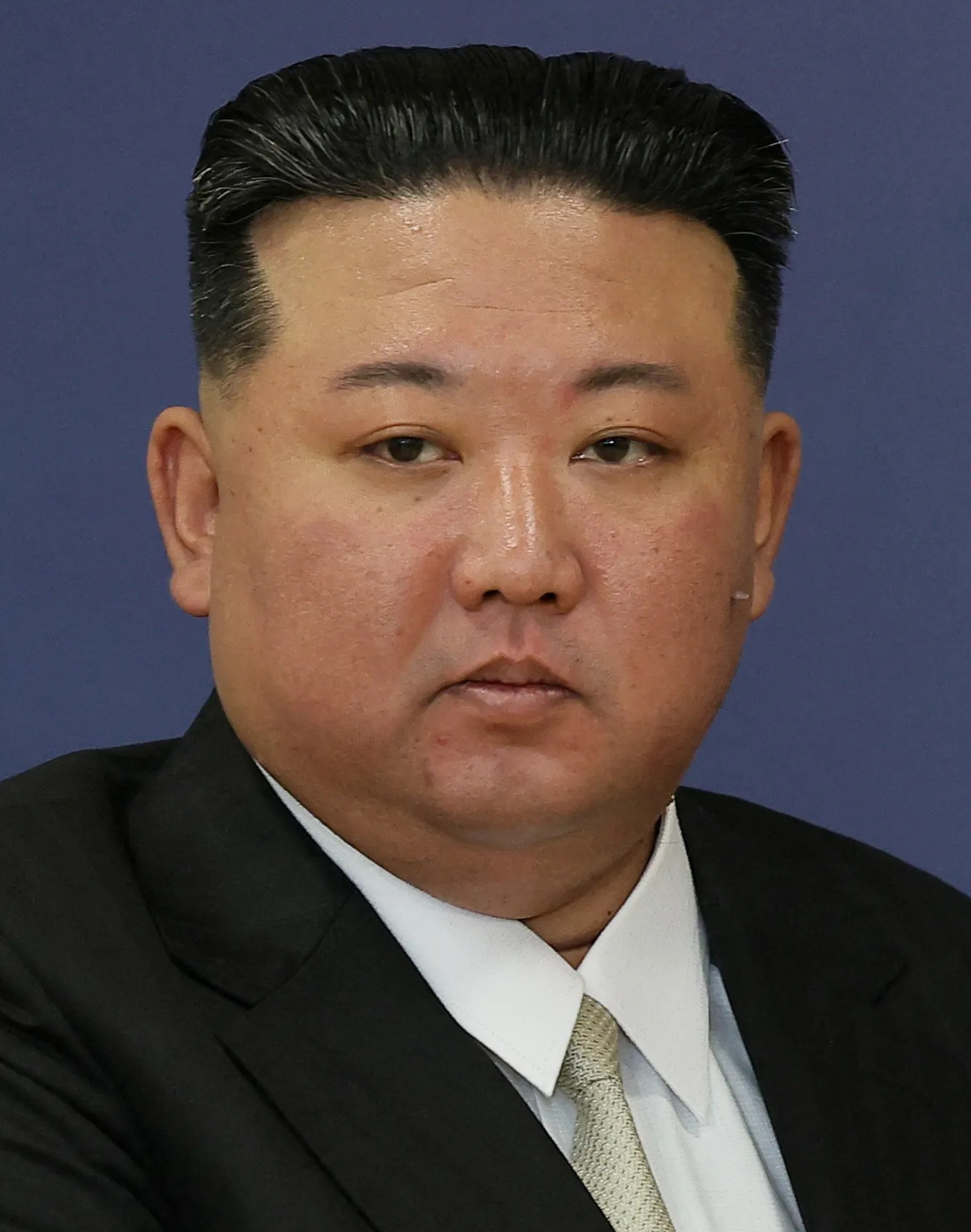
- Kim Il Sung Kim Jong Il Kim Jong Un
- Parent family: Jeonju Kim clan
- Country: North Korea
- Founded: 17 June 1848; 178 years ago
- Founder: Kim Ŭngu
- Current head: Kim Jong Un
- Titles: Supreme Leader of North Korea; General Secretary of the Workers' Party of Korea (since 2021) (Note: Historical names: Chairman of the Central Committee of the Workers' Party of Korea (1949–1966) General Secretary of the Workers' Party of Korea (1996–1997) First Secretary of the Workers' Party of Korea (1997–2016) Chairman of the Workers' Party of Korea (2016–2021)); Respected First Lady; Eternal leaders of Juche Korea (since 2016) (Note: Historical names: Eternal General Secretary of the Workers' Party of Korea and Eternal Chairman of the National Defence Commission (2012–2016) Eternal President of the Democratic People's Republic of Korea (2012) Eternal President of the Republic (1998–2012))
- Styles: Great Leader (Kim Il Sung); Dear Leader (Kim Jong Il); Respected Comrade (Kim Jong Un)
- Members: Kim Il Sung; Kim Jong Il; Kim Jong Un; Other members: Kim Il Sung's wives: Kim Jong Suk; Kim Song Ae; Kim Il Sung's sons: Kim Man Il; Kim Pyong Il; Kim Yong Il; Kim Kyong Jin; Kim Il Sung's daughters: Kim Kyong Hui; Kim Jong Il's wives: Hong Il Chon; Ko Yong Hui; Kim Jong Il's sons: Kim Jong-nam (assassinated); Kim Jong Chol; Kim Jong Il's daughters: Kim Yo Jong; Kim Sol Song; Kim Hye Kyong; Kim Jong Un's family: Ri Sol-ju (wife); Kim Ju Ae (daughter); (son); (son)
- Connected members: Jang Song-thaek; Jang Kum-song
- Traditions: Juche (Ten Principles)
- Estate: Residences of North Korean leaders

Paektu bloodline
- Hangul: 백두혈통
- Hanja: 白頭血統
- RR: Baekdu hyeoltong
- MR: Paektu hyŏlt'ong

The Kim family is the three-generation lineage of North Korean leadership, descending from the country's founder and first leader, Kim Il Sung. Officially known as the Mount Paektu Bloodline (Korean: 백두혈통) in the ideological discourse of the Workers' Party of Korea (WPK), it is often referred to as the Kim dynasty after the end of the Cold War.

Kim Il Sung came to rule North Korea in 1948, after the end of Japanese rule split the region in 1945. Following his death in 1994, Kim Il Sung's role as supreme leader was passed to his son, Kim Jong Il, and then in 2011 to his grandson, Kim Jong Un. The three have each served as leaders of the Workers' Party of Korea and as North Korea's supreme leaders since the state's establishment in 1948.

The North Korean government denies that there is a personality cult surrounding the Kim family, describing the people's devotion to the family as a personal manifestation of support for their nation's leadership. The Kim family has been described as a de facto absolute monarchy, or hereditary dictatorship.

== Historical overview ==
The Kim family has ruled North Korea since 1948 for three generations, and still little about the family is publicly confirmed. Kim Il Sung rebelled against Japanese rule over Korea in the 1930s, which led to his exile in the Soviet Union. Korea was divided after the Japanese surrender in World War II in 1945. Kim came to lead the Provisional People's Committee for North Korea (a Soviet-backed provisional government), becoming the first premier of its new government, the "Democratic People's Republic of Korea" (commonly known as North Korea), in 1948. Hoping to reunify the peninsula, on 25 June 1950 the North Korean KPA crossed the 38th Parallel, sparking the Korean War, which ended in stalemate in 1953.

Kim developed a personality cult over his nearly 46-year leadership which extended to his family, including his mother Kang Pan Sok (known as the "mother of Korea"), his brother Kim Yong-ju ("the revolutionary fighter") and his first wife Kim Jong Suk (the "mother of the revolution"). The strong and absolute leadership of a solitary great leader, known as the Suryong, is central to the North Korean ideology of Juche. Four years after Kim Il Sung's 1994 death, a constitutional change wrote the presidency out of the constitution and named him as Eternal President of the Republic in order to honor his memory forever. Kim Il Sung was known as the Great Leader, and his eldest son and successor, Kim Jong Il, became known as the Dear Leader and later the Great General. Kim Jong Il altogether had over 50 titles.

Kim Jong Il was appointed to the Workers Party's Politburo (and its Presidium), Secretariat and the Central Military Commission at the 6th Workers Party Congress in October 1980, which formalized his role as heir apparent. He led their military from 1990, and had a 14-year grooming period before he became North Korea's ruler. Kim Jong Il had a sister, Kim Kyung-hee, who was North Korea's first female four-star general and married to Jang Song-thaek, who was the second most powerful person in North Korea before his December 2013 execution for corruption. Kim Jong Il had four partners, and at least five children with three of them. His third and youngest son, Kim Jong Un, succeeded him. Scholar Virginie Grzelczyk wrote that the Kim family represented "one of the last bastions of totalitarianism as well as perhaps 'the first Communist Dynasty'".

== Ancestry ==
Kim Il Sung was born in Mangyongdae-guyok to Methodist parents. His father Kim Hyong Jik was 15 when he married Kang Pan Sok two years his elder. Kim Hyong Jik had attended a school founded by Christian missionaries, which influenced his own family. Kim Hyong Jik became a father at the age of 17, and left school to work as a teacher in a nearby school he once attended. He later practiced Chinese herbal medicine as a doctor. Kim Hyong Jik protested against Japanese rule and was arrested several times for his activism. He was a founding member of the Korean National Association in 1917, participated in the 1919 March First Movement, and fled Korea for Manchuria with his wife and young Kim Il Sung in 1920. There is a teacher's college named after him in Pyongyang.

Kim Hyong Jik's own parents, Kim Pohyŏn and Yi Poik, were described as "patriots" by the Editorial Committee of the Short Biography of Kim Il Sung.

The Kim dynasty is part of the Jeonju Kim clan.

== Kim Il Sung ==
Kim Il Sung married twice and had six children. He met his first wife, Kim Jong Suk, in 1936, marrying her in 1940. She bore sons Kim Jong Il (born 1941 or 1942) and Kim Man Il (born 1944), and daughter Kim Kyong Hui (born 1946) before dying while bearing a stillborn daughter in 1949. Kim Jong Suk was born 24 December 1917 in Hoeryong in (North) Hamgyo'ng Province. She and her family fled Korea to Yanji in China's Kirin Province around 1922. In October 1947, Kim Jong Suk presided over the establishment of a school for war orphans in South Pyongan Province, which became the Mangyongdae Revolutionary School. When the school opened in west Pyongyang one year after its foundation, Kim Jong Suk also unveiled the country's first statue to Kim Il Sung. In 1949, Kim Jong Suk was once again pregnant. She continued public activities, but her health diminished. She died on 19 September 1949 due to complications from pregnancy. Kim Il Sung had three children with his second wife, Kim Song Ae: Kim Kyong Il (born 1951), Kim Pyong Il (born 1953), and Kim Yong Il (born 1955). He had two younger brothers, Kim Chol-ju and Kim Yong-ju and a sister.

When Kim Il Sung's first wife died, Kim Song-ae was not recognized as Kim Il Sung's wife for several years. Neither partnership had public weddings. Born Kim Sŏngp'al in the early 1920s in South P'yongyang Province, Kim Song-ae began her career as a clerical worker in the Ministry of National Defense where she first met Kim Il Sung in 1948. She was hired to work in his residence as an assistant to Kim Jong Suk. In addition to doing secretarial work for the Kims, she also looked after Kim Jong Il and Kim Kyong-hui. After Kim Jong Suk's 1949 death, Kim Song-ae began managing Kim Il Sung's household and domestic life.

In 1953, Kim Song-ae gave birth to her first child with Kim Il Sung, a daughter named Kim Kyong Jin (Kim Kyong Chin). She went on to have at least two other children with him, sons Kim Pyong Il (b. 1954) and Kim Yong Ill (b. 1955).

Kim Kyong-hui became North Korea's first female four-star general. Her husband Jang Song-thaek was the second most powerful person in Korea before his December 2013 execution for corruption. Their 29-year-old daughter overdosed on sleeping pills in 2006 while in Paris. It has also been reported that Kim Yong-il, who was dispatched to serve in Germany, died from cirrhosis of the liver in 2000.

== Kim Jong Il ==
Kim Jong Il had four partners, and at least six children with three of them. He married his first wife, Hong Il-chon, at the behest of Kim Il Sung in 1966. They had one daughter, Kim Hye-kyung (born 1968), before divorcing in 1969. He later fathered Kim Jong-nam (born 1971) with his first consort, film star Song Hye-rim. Due to Song being a divorcée, Kim concealed the relationship and son from his father. In 1974, Kim Jong Il married his second wife, Kim Young-suk. They had two daughters, Kim Sol-song (born 1974) and Kim Chun-song (born 1976). Kim Jong Il divorced her in 1977, after she lost his personal interest. In 1980, Kim Jong Il married his third wife, Ko Yong Hui. Ko was the de facto First Lady of North Korea from Kim Jong Il's becoming of leader in 1994 until her death in 2004. The couple had two sons, Kim Jong-chul (born 1981) and Kim Jong Un (born 1982 or 1983), and one daughter, Kim Yo Jong (born 1987). After Ko Yong Hui's death, Kim Jong Il was married to his personal secretary, Kim Ok. The two were married until Kim Jong Il's death, and did not have any children. The two half-brothers Kim Jong Un and Kim Jong-nam never met, because of the ancient practice of raising potential successors separately. From the early 1980s onward, Kim Jong Il dichotomized the Kim Family between its main, or central, branch (won kaji) and its side, or extraneous, branch (kyot kaji). The main branch referred to Kim Il Sung's family with Kim Jong Suk and publicly included Kim Jong Il and Kim Kyong-hui. The side branch referred to Kim Il Sung's family with Kim Sung-ae and included the three children from their marriage.

Kim Jong Un's two older brothers were considered "black sheep" of the family. Kim Jong-nam likely fell out of favor due to advocating for reform in the government. He had a reputation as a troublemaker within the family, and publicly stated in 2011 that North Korea should transition out of his family's rule. On 13 February 2017, Kim Jong-nam was assassinated with the chemical nerve agent VX at Kuala Lumpur International Airport in Malaysia. Two women, one Indonesian and one Vietnamese, smeared the agent on Kim Jong-nam's face; both women were released after it was determined that they had been tricked by North Korean operatives, who had told them that the act was a prank for a Japanese comedy program and that the substance was lotion. Four North Koreans fled Malaysia on the day of the murder. Kim Jong-nam was survived by his wife and six children. His son, Kim Han-sol, has also criticized the regime. In an interview with Finnish media in 2012, Kim Han-sol openly criticized the reclusive regime and the government saying that he has always dreamed that one day he would return to his homeland to "make things better". Ever since the death of his father, his whereabouts have been unknown. It was later revealed in 2019 that Jong-nam was a CIA informant prior to his assassination.

The middle son, Kim Jong-chul, was reportedly not considered in succession considerations due to his unmasculine characteristics. He is also known to be reserved.

== Kim Jong Un ==
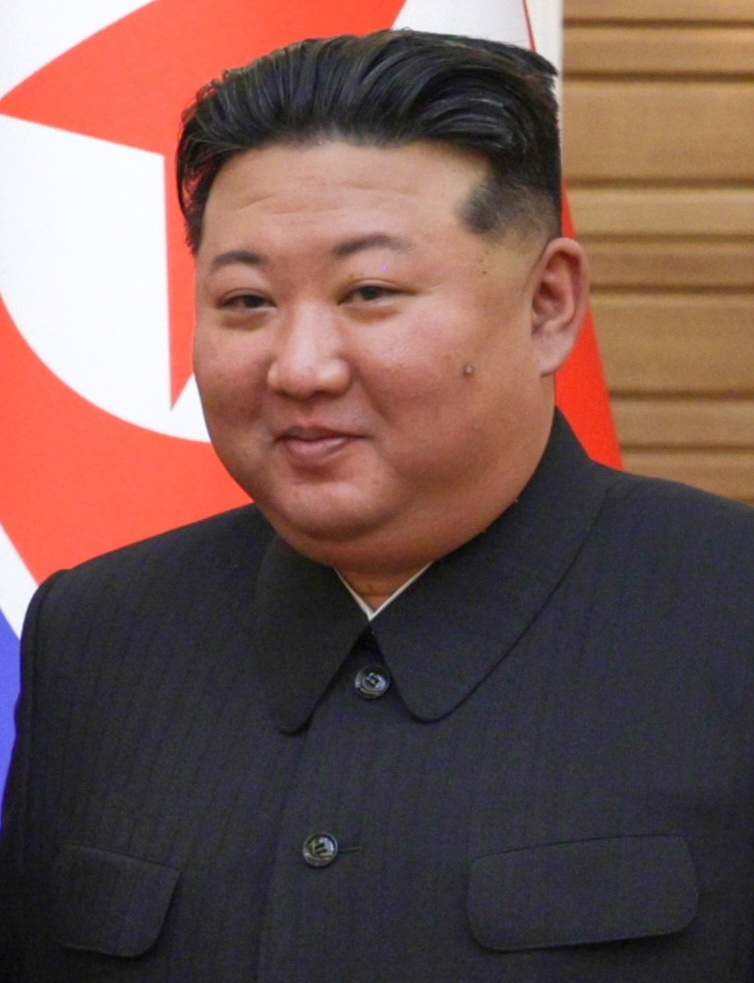
Current supreme leader of North Korea and General Secretary of the Workers' Party of Korea Kim Jong Un

Kim Jong Un became North Korea's Supreme Leader on 29 December 2011. He married Ri Sol-ju in either 2009 or 2010, and the couple reportedly had a daughter, Kim Ju Ae, in 2012. His sister Kim Yo Jong had fallen out of favor with her brother for a few years, but in 2017, she was elevated by Kim Jong Un to the Central Committee of the Workers' Party of Korea. Kim Jong Un made an effort to distinguish himself from the reputations of his father and brothers and has promoted the image of an academic who possesses a masculine and extroverted demeanor.

In April 2020, a three-week absence from public view led to speculation that Kim was seriously ill or dead, but no clear evidence of any health problem came to light. He continued to appear in public rarely over the following months, possibly because of health problems or the risk of COVID-19. In August, it was reported that Kim had ceded a degree of authority to his sister, Kim Yo Jong, giving her responsibility for relations with South Korea and the United States and making her his de facto second-in-command.

== Possible successors ==
=== Kim Ju Ae ===
Kim Ju Ae is the daughter of North Korean supreme leader Kim Jong Un and his wife Ri Sol-ju.

Kim Ju Ae appeared in public for the first time at a missile launch in November 2022. She had made five public appearances by early February 2023. State media initially called her Kim Jong Un's "beloved" daughter, but soon began using the adjective "respected", which is reserved only for the most honoured members of North Korean society, such as Kim Ju Ae's parents. Some analysts believe that her new public profile is an attempt to present the Kim family in the fashion of a traditional monarchy or a response to rivalries within the North Korean government. It has also led to speculation that she has been chosen as her father's successor, which could make her the first woman to serve as Supreme Leader.

In February 2026, the South Korean National Intelligence Service (NIS) stated that Kim Ju Ae had completed successor training and had become the official designated successor of her father. They cited her attendance at military events, her increased involvement in policy decisions, and a visit to the Kumsusan Palace of the Sun, which is a symbol of the bloodline. She was then reported to be appointed within the Korean People's Army's Missile Administration on 22 February 2026 by her father.

=== Kim Yo Jong ===
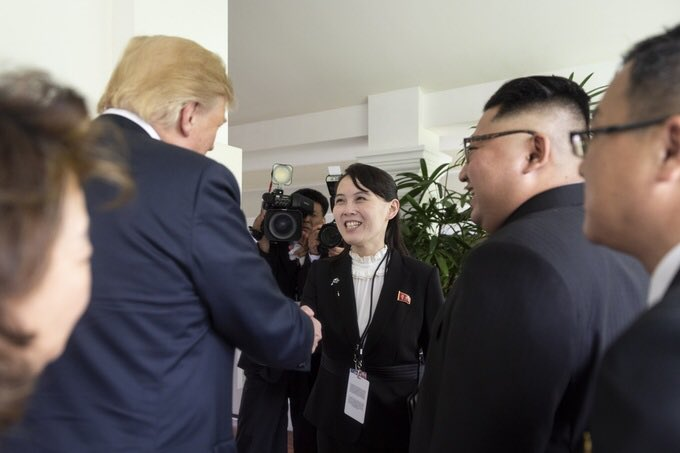
US President Donald Trump greets Kim Yo Jong

Kim Yo Jong, the younger sister of Kim Jong Un, is considered a "rising star" within North Korean politics. She represented North Korea in the 2018 Winter Olympics in South Korea, becoming the first member of the Kim family to visit since the end of the war, and has also played a key role behind the scenes. She met US President Donald Trump in 2018.

=== Kim Pyong Il ===
Kim Pyong Il is the last living son of the country's founder, Kim Il Sung. After losing out to Kim Jong Il, he spent four decades as an ambassador to various European countries, until returning in 2019. He is thought of as having an advantage over Kim Yo Jong due to his gender, but simultaneously carrying a disadvantage due to his lack of connections. He has an adult son, Kim In-kang, and an adult daughter, Kim Ung-song.

=== Unlikely heirs ===
Kim Jong Chul, the older brother of Kim Jong Un, has been described as "lacking in ambition" and to be more interested in Eric Clapton and playing guitars.

Kim Jong Un is also reported to have two other children born a few years before and after Kim Ju Ae.

Kim Il Sung's deceased brother, Kim Yong-ju, had two biological and two adopted children, whose identity and current positions within the North Korean government are obscure.

== Family tree ==
Select (Note: To keep the tree of manageable size, it omits five out of the seven known legitimate children of Kim Il Sung. Other children not shown in the tree are: Kim Man-il (1944–1947; child of Kim Jong-suk), Kim Kyong-jin (born 1952; child of Kim Song-ae), Kim Yong-il (1955–2000; child of Kim Song-ae), and Kim Kyong-suk (born 1951; child of Kim Song-ae). A stillborn daughter is also omitted. Kim Il Sung was reported to have had other children with women who he was not married to; they included Kim Hyŏn-nam (born 1972). Also, only some of the descendants of Kim Jong Il and Kim Jong Un (Kim Il Sung's successors) are included.) family tree of North Korea's ruling Kim family (Note: Korean names often have a variety of transliterations into English, which can be confusing. For example, "Kim Jong Chul" may also be written "Gim Jeong-cheol" or "Kim Jŏng-ch'ŏl" among many other variations. See Korean romanization for more information.) (Note: Huss, Kan; Frost, Clay. "North Korea's First Family: Mapping the personal and political drama of the Kim clan". msnbc.com. Archived from the original on 4 February 2012. (Confirms many, but not all, of the birth and death years. See individual articles for more references.))

Kim Song-ryeong; 1810–1899
Kim Ŭngu; 1848–1878
Kim Pohyŏn; 1871–1955
Kim Hyong-jik; 1894–1926 | Kang Pan Sok; 1892–1932
Kim Jong-suk; 1917–1949 | Kim Il Sung; 1912–1994 | Kim Song-ae; 1924–2014 | Kim Yong-ju; 1920–2021
Kim Young-sook; 1947– | Song Hye-rim; 1937–2002 | Kim Jong Il; 1941? (Note: Official North Korean biographies of Kim Jong Il list his birth year as 1942. The Korean calendar is based upon the Chinese zodiac which is believed to characterize one's personality. The year 1942 (Year of the Horse), in addition to being 30 years since Kim Il Sung's birth may be viewed as a better year than others, thus creating a motive to lie about a birth year.)–2011 | Ko Yong-hui; 1952–2004 | Kim Ok; 1964– | Kim Kyong-hui; 1946– | Jang Song-thaek; 1946–2013 | Kim Pyong Il; 1954–
Kim Sol-song; 1974– | Kim Jong-nam; 1971–2017 | Kim Jong Chul; 1981– | Kim Jong Un; 1983? (Note: Official North Korean biographies of Kim Jong Un list his birth year as 1982. The Korean calendar is based upon the Chinese zodiac which is believed to characterize one's personality. The year 1982 (Year of the Dog), in addition to being 70 years since Kim Il Sung's birth, may be viewed as a better year than others, thus creating a motive to lie about a birth year.)– | Ri Sol-ju c. 1986– | Kim Yo Jong; 1987–
Kim Han-sol; 1995– | Kim Ju Ae c. 2012 (Note: Birth year for Kim Ju Ae is not publicly known. She may have been born in either late 2012 or early 2013.)–

== See also ==
- General Secretary Kim
- Jeonju Kim clan
- List of heads of state of North Korea
- List of political families
- Supreme Leader (North Korean title)
- Mount Paektu
- North Korean cult of personality
- O family
- Politics of North Korea
