= Yi Han-yong =

North Korean defector (1960–1997)

Yi Han-yeong
- Born: Yi Il-nam; 2 April 1960; Pyongyang, North Korea
- Died: 25 February 1997 (aged 36); Seongnam, South Korea
- Known for: Defection to South Korea
- Parent(s): Seong Hye-rang (mother); Lee Tae-soon (father)

Korean name
- Hangul: 이한영
- Hanja: 李韓永
- RR: I Hanyeong
- MR: I Hanyŏng

Former name
- Hangul: 리일남
- Hanja: 李一男
- RR: Ri Ilnam
- MR: Ri Illam

Yi Han-yeong (Korean: 이한영; 2 April 1960 – 25 February 1997), birth name Ri Il-nam (리일남), was a North Korean defector who was the nephew of the country's leader, Kim Jong Il. After his defection in 1982, he went into hiding for a number of years, before going public in support of Seong Hye-rim, his aunt and Kim's mistress or wife, and wrote a book about his experiences in exile, after which he was murdered by unknown assailants.

== Early life ==
Yi's mother, Seong Hye-rang, raised Kim Jong Il's and her younger sister Hye-rim's son Kim Jong-nam alongside Yi and Yi's sister Nam-ok at a secluded villa outside of Pyongyang in order to keep Jong-nam's parentage a secret from Kim Il Sung. Song Hye-rim is described as the former wife of Kim Jong Il, though it is unclear whether they were actually married.

Yi went abroad to Moscow for a university education, and then defected to South Korea in 1982 while studying at a language school in Switzerland.

His defection in 1982 had been kept secret due to his connections. He underwent plastic surgery and changed his name to conceal his identity. His identity was revealed when he had told newspapers he was financially supporting his aunt's defection who was in Moscow.

== Life in South Korea ==
His life in the South was troubled. He first studied drama at Hanyang University, and married in 1988; however, in March 1993, a construction company he started went bankrupt, and he was jailed for 10 months on charges of embezzlement. In 1996, due to his ongoing financial difficulties, Yi made his identity as Kim Jong Il's nephew known publicly, selling the story of his aunt Song Hye-rim's exile in Moscow to South Korean newspapers, and then publishing a book about his experiences entitled Taedong River Royal Family.

== Death by shooting ==
Yi was shot on 15 February 1997 near his home in Bundang, Seongnam by two assailants who were never caught; they were suspected of being members of the Korean People's Army's Special Forces based on analysis of the bullets taken from Yi's body, which were fired from a Belgian-made Browning pistol. He was taken to hospital and kept on life-support, but succumbed to his wounds ten days later (25 February).

South Korean prime minister Lee Soo-sung initially stated that the attack was an act of retaliation for the defection of Hwang Jang-yop, who at the time was living in the South Korean embassy in Beijing. The publication of Yi's tell-all book and the defection of his mother in Switzerland the previous year may have served as additional factors in making him a target of the regime in the North. Others speculated at the time that his murder was not politically motivated, but was instead related to his gambling debts or a dispute with a lover.

== Publications ==
- Yi, Han-yong (1996). 대동강 로열패밀리 서울잠행 14년 [Taedong River Royal Family: my 14 years incognito in Seoul]. The Dong-A Ilbo (in Korean). ISBN 89-7090-110-8.
  - Republished as Yi, Han-yong (2004). 김정일 로열패밀리 [Kim Jong-il's Royal Family] (in Korean). Sidae Jeongsin. ISBN 89-90959-06-3.
