= Kim Young-soon =

North Korean dancer (born 1937)

- Born: Kim Young-soon; 1937 (age 88–89); Shenyang, China
- Other names: Kim Yung-sun
- Education: Choi Seung-hee Dance Institute
- Alma mater: Pyongyang Arts University
- Occupations: Dancer; Human rights activist; Choreographer
- Years active: 1950 - present
- Children: 4

Kim Young-soon (Korean: 김영순; born 1937 in Shenyang, China) is a North Korean defector, human rights activist, dancer, and choreographer. She is known for surviving a nine-year imprisonment in the Yodok political prison camp and later speaking out about human rights abuses in North Korea. Her story gained international attention through her memoir, public testimonies, and the musical Yodok Story, which was based on her experiences.

== Early life and career ==
Kim Young-soon was born in Shenyang, Manchuria, in 1937, and moved to Korea when she was eight years old. Her family was part of the North Korean elite due to her older brother being a revered general in the Workers' Party. Growing up in this environment, her family occasionally received gifts from Kim Il-sung and attended cultural events.

She pursued a career in dance, studying under the renowned dancer Choi Seung-hee at Pyongyang Arts University. After graduating, she became a celebrated dancer and later a choreographer, serving for 13 years in the Korean People's Army Performance Troupe. She eventually reached the rank of lieutenant.

She was also a close friend and high school classmate of actress Song Hye-rim, who became the secret mistress of Kim Jong-il, a fact hidden even from Kim Il-sung because Sung was a divorced woman and five years older than Kim Jong-il.

== Personal life ==
Kim Young-soon was married and had four children: three sons and one daughter. After her release from the camp, in a desperate attempt to give her daughter a better chance at life, Kim gave her up for adoption to a farming family.

== Imprisonment in Yodok ==
In August 1970, Kim Young-soon was arrested without being charged with a crime. The actual reason, which she would not discover until years later, was her knowledge of the clandestine relationship between her friend Song Hye-rim and Kim Jong-il. Knowing such a sensitive secret was considered a threat to the Kim dynasty's security.

Kim was sent to the notorious Yodok No. 15 political prison camp. Under North Korea's policy of guilt-by-association, her parents, husband, and four children were also imprisoned. The conditions in the camp were brutal, involving hard labor, malnutrition, and a complete lack of human rights.

During her nine years in the camp (1970–1979), her parents died of starvation and her infant son died due to the harsh conditions. Her 23-year-old son was shot and killed in 1989 while trying to escape to China after their release. Her husband was sent to a different prison camp and never seen again.

== Defection and Activism ==
Kim was released in 1979 at the age of 43 through the intervention of a military official who knew her war hero brother. For the next 19 years, she lived under constant surveillance. In 1982, security agents summoned her and explicitly warned her against spreading "groundless rumors" about Sung Hye-rim and Kim Jong-il, confirming the reason for her past imprisonment.

Convinced she had to escape, she fled North Korea in 2001 by bribing her way across the Tumen River into China. After spending two and a half years hiding in China, she traveled through Southeast Asia and successfully defected to South Korea in 2003 with her surviving son.

In South Korea, Kim became a vocal human rights activist. She has shared her testimony globally, including at the UN Commission of Inquiry on Human Rights in the DPRK and before the U.S. Congress. She has held several leadership positions in human rights organizations, such as president of the Association of North Korean Defector Artists.

Kim published an autobiography in 2008 (or 2009) titled I Was Sung Hye-rim's Friend. Her life story also inspired the 2006 musical Yodok Story, for which she served as a choreographer. In 2018, she was one of eight North Korean escapees invited to meet with U.S. President Donald Trump.

Today, she continues to work as a dance instructor, directing the Choi Seung-hee Dance Education Institute in Seoul to preserve the legacy of her mentor.

== Awards and nominations ==
- Certificate of Appreciation from the Chairman of the Korean Traditional Culture and Arts Association (2023)

== Books ==
- Autobiography - I Was Sung Hye-rim's Friend
