= Seong Hye-rang =

North Korean defector and author (born 14 January 1936)

- Hangul: 성혜랑
- Hanja: 成蕙琅
- RR: Seong Hyerang
- MR: Sŏng Hyerang

Seong Hye-rang (Korean: 성혜랑; born 14 January 1936) is a North Korean defector and author.

== Early life ==
Her father was a wealthy South Korean landowner who moved to the North for political reasons, while her mother was an editor of the official North Korean newspaper Rodong Shinmun.

Seong's younger sister Song Hye-rim, a popular actress, secretly began an affair with Kim Jong Il against his father Kim Il Sung's wishes in the late 1960s or early 1970s, which culminated in Hye-rim's forced divorce from her husband; Hye-rang first learned of the situation on 10 May 1971, when Kim came to her residence in the middle of the night and informed her that he had impregnated her younger sister.

Five years later, Hye-rang would become responsible for raising Kim Jong-nam, the son resulting from that pregnancy; his father was unwilling to let him attend school for fear that the secret of his parentage would be revealed. Hye-rang moved into the household; she also brought her own son Lee Han-yeong and daughter Lee Nam-ok to live with them, so that Jong-nam would not be lonely. Their lives were carefully managed by Kim Jong Il to ensure that his father would not find out about his continuing affair; they spent most of their time at residences in east Pyongyang or Chungsangdong, occasionally travelling overseas to Geneva and Moscow.

== Defection ==
On September 28, 1982, Seong Hye-rang's son defected to South Korea; her daughter followed ten years later. Seong herself defected in Geneva in February 1996, carrying nothing but her medicines, her diary, and a book of short stories by Anton Chekhov. Following her defection, she went into hiding in the European countryside in fear of her life, travelling with an unidentified Japanese woman; her son was shot dead near his home in Gyeonggi-do, South Korea by unknown assailants the following year. She now lives in an undisclosed location in Europe.

== Publications ==
- Seong, Hye-rang (December 2000). 등나무집:성혜랑 자서전 [Wisteria House: The Autobiography of Song Hye-rang] (in Korean). Seoul: Chisiknara. ISBN 89-8375-538-5.
- Seong, Hye-rang (February 2001). 北朝鮮はるかなり―金正日官邸で暮らした20年 [Faraway North Korea - 20 years living in the palace of Kim Jong-il] (in Japanese). Translated by Hagiwara Ryō. Bungeishunjū. ISBN 4163571604.
