= President Kim =

President Kim may refer to:

== North Korea ==
- Kim Il Sung (1912–1994), president of North Korea
- Kim Yong-nam (1928–2025), President of the Presidium of the Supreme People's Assembly
- Kim Jong Un (born 1984), President of the State Affairs Commission

== South Korea ==
- Kim Young-sam (1927–2015), 7th president of South Korea
- Kim Dae-jung (1924–2009), 8th president of South Korea

== See also ==
- General Secretary Kim
- Kim (surname)
