= Jung-il =

- Hangul: 정일
- RR: Jeongil
- MR: Chŏngil

Jung-il, also spelled Jeong-il, Jong-il, or Chung-il, is a Korean given name.

People with this name include:

- Kim Jong-il (1941–2011), North Korean leader
- Park Chung-il (born 1959), South Korean footballer
- Lee Jung-il (born 1956), South Korean footballer
- Jang Jung-il (born 1962), South Korean poet
- Byun Jung-il (born 1968), South Korean boxer

== See also ==
- List of Korean given names
