= Pak Nam-gi =

North Korean politician (1934–2010)

Korean name
- Hangul: 박남기
- Hanja: 朴南基
- RR: Bak Namgi
- MR: Pak Namgi

Pak Nam-gi or Park Nam-ki (21 February 1934 – 17 March 2010) was, until as late as January 2010, Director of the Planning and Finance Department of the ruling party of North Korea. There are doubts about his date of birth, with at least two unattributed sources reporting it as 21 February 1934 or sometime in 1928 respectively.

In March 2010, it was reported by news agencies including Yonhap, Bloomberg, and The Guardian that Pak had been tried and then executed by firing squad in Pyongyang for the offense of being "a son of a bourgeois conspiring to infiltrate the ranks of revolutionaries to destroy the national economy". According to the Guardian, he had been denounced as a traitor during a meeting in January 2010 and arrested on the spot. This related to the devaluation of the North Korean won in November 2009, which led to a crisis after rendering valueless many people's savings. Following his execution, Pak was subsequently edited out of various official films and photographs.

Although John Park, a Stanton junior faculty fellow at MIT, claimed in 2012 that Pak Nam-gi is still alive and had resurfaced after his alleged execution, Ri Je-gang, the former First Deputy Head of the WPK Organization and Guidance Department, says Pak Nam-gi was executed by firing squad in the course of a reactionary purge in 2010.

In December 2013 when Jang Sung-taek, uncle of supreme leader Kim Jong Un, was executed, amongst the charges against Jang was that Jang had been the "wirepuller behind the scene" of "Pak Nam Gi, traitor for all ages".

== See also ==
- 2009 North Korean currency reform
