= Kim Jong-nam =

Son of Kim Jong Il (1971–2017)

- Kim in 2001
- Born: 10 May 1971; Pyongyang, North Korea
- Died: 13 February 2017 (aged 45); Sepang District, Selangor, Malaysia
- Cause of death: Assassination (VX poisoning)
- Education: Kim Il Sung University
- Political party: Workers' Party of Korea
- Spouses: Shin Jong-hui; Lee Hye-kyong
- Partner: So Yong-la
- Children: 6, including Kim Han-sol
- Parents: Kim Jong Il (father); Song Hye-rim (mother)
- Relatives: Kim family
- Military career
- Allegiance: North Korea
- Branch: Korean People's Army Ground Force
- Rank: Colonel

Korean name
- Hangul: 김정남
- Hanja: 金正男
- RR: Gim Jeongnam
- MR: Kim Chŏngnam

Kim Jong-nam (Korean: 김정남, Korean: [kim.dzɔŋ.nam]; (Note: The given name Jong-nam / Jong Nam is pronounced [tsʌŋ.nam] in isolation.) 10 May 1971 – 13 February 2017) was the eldest son of North Korean leader Kim Jong Il. From roughly 1994 to 2001, he was considered the heir apparent to his father. In 2017, Kim was assassinated in Kuala Lumpur International Airport, Malaysia; North Korean leader Kim Jong Un, his half-brother, was widely believed responsible. Kim was speculated to have fallen out of favor in 2001 following his deportation from Japan to China while attempting to visit Tokyo Disneyland on a forged passport; Kim claimed his fall was due to advocating "reform and market-opening".

Kim reportedly spent his childhood in international schools in the Soviet Union and Switzerland before returning to North Korea in 1988. Kim was exiled from North Korea around 2003; he settled in Macau, becoming an occasional critic of his family's regime. He gained a reputation for gambling and drinking as an "international playboy". In 2006, Kim reportedly survived an assassination attempt at Budapest Ferihegy International Airport while visiting his brother Kim Jong Chul. His younger paternal half-brother, Kim Jong Un, was named heir apparent in September 2010. In 2012, he survived an assassination attempt in Macau, after which he fled to Singapore.

On 13 February 2017, Kim was assassinated with the nerve agent VX in Kuala Lumpur International Airport, Malaysia, widely believed to have been perpetrated by agents of North Korea's Reconnaissance General Bureau. US newspapers later reported Kim as a likely Central Intelligence Agency (CIA) source; Kim's son Kim Han-sol has since been under the protective custody of the CIA and is reportedly living in the United States.

== Life and career ==
=== Early life (1971–1998) ===
Kim Jong-nam was born on 10 May 1971 in Pyongyang, North Korea, to Song Hye-rim, one of four women known to have had children with Kim Jong Il. Because Kim Jong Il aimed to keep his affair with Song a secret due to the disapproval of his father Kim Il Sung, he initially kept Jong-nam out of school, instead sending him to live with Song's older sister Song Hye-rang, who tutored him at home. North Korea Leadership Watch says he left North Korea to visit his grandmother in Moscow, Soviet Union, and spent his childhood at international schools in both Russia and Switzerland until returning to his home country in 1988.

Kim Jong-nam was reported to have had a personality similar to that of his father, and was described by his aunt as being "hot-tempered, sensitive, and gifted in the arts". His aunt also said in 2000 that he "[did] not wish to succeed his father". Like Kim Jong Il, he was interested in film: he wrote scripts and short films from a young age. His father also created a small movie set for him to use.

Kim Jong-nam made several clandestine visits to Japan, starting as early as 1995.

=== 1998–2001: Heir apparent ===
In 1998, Kim Jong-nam was appointed to a senior position in the Ministry of Public Security of North Korea, as a future leader. He was also reported to have been appointed head of the North Korean Computer Committee, in charge of developing an information technology (IT) industry. In January 2001, he accompanied his father to Shanghai, where he had talks with Chinese officials on the IT industry.

=== 2001–2005: Tokyo Disneyland incident and loss of favor ===
In May 2001, Kim Jong-nam was arrested in Japan on arrival at Narita International Airport, accompanied by two women and a four-year-old boy identified as his son. He was traveling on a forged Dominican Republic passport using a Chinese alias, Pang Xiong (Chinese: 胖熊; lit. 'fat bear'). After being detained, he was deported to China, where he said he was traveling to Japan to visit Tokyo Disneyland. The incident caused his father to cancel a planned visit to China due to the embarrassment it caused him.

Until the Tokyo incident, Kim Jong-nam was expected to become leader of the country after his father. In February 2003, the Korean People's Army began a propaganda campaign under the slogan "The respected Mother who is the most-faithful and loyal Subject to the Dear Leader Comrade Supreme Commander". This was interpreted as praise of Ko Yong Hui, and likely part of a campaign designed to promote Kim Jong-chul or Kim Jong Un, her sons.

Since the loyalty of the army is the foundation of the Kim family's continuing hold on power in North Korea, this was a serious detriment for Kim Jong-nam's prospects. In late 2003, it was reported that Kim Jong-nam was living in Macau, lending strength to this belief.

Kim Jong Un was left in charge while his father was on a state-visit to China. Outsider observers also believed North Korea's sinking of a South Korean ship in March 2010 was part of Kim Jong Il's attempt to secure succession for the youngest Kim: provoking a security crisis he could use to rally military support behind Kim Jong Un.

Kim Jong-nam's loss of favor was thought to have been caused by the Tokyo incident. However, Kim Jong-nam himself claimed that he had fallen out of favor due to advocating for reform. In an email to the editor of the Tokyo Shimbun, Kim Jong-nam wrote that after being educated in Switzerland, he "insisted on reform and market-opening", leading his father to decide that he had "turned into a capitalist". Kim Jong-nam at this time has also been described as "the closest North Korean ever to have been an international playboy", and gained a reputation for "gambling and drinking and arranging the occasional business deal". He used to be the only member of the Kim family to ever speak directly to media outside of North Korea, until Kim Jong Un took a question from a foreign journalist during the 2019 North Korea - United States Hanoi Summit.

It was believed that Kim Jong-nam had friendly ties to China. Outside analysts considered him as a possible candidate to replace Kim Jong Un if the North Korean leadership imploded and China, traditionally an ally, sought a replacement leader.

=== 2005–2017: Rise of Kim Jong Un ===
The Asahi Shimbun reported that Kim Jong-nam, while traveling to see his brother Kim Jong-chul in Munich, survived an assassination attempt at the Budapest Ferihegy International Airport in July 2006. According to South Korean reports, the Hungarian government protested against the incident to the North Korean embassy in Vienna, requesting there be no recurrence. It was reported in the South China Morning Post, on 1 February 2007, that Kim Jong-nam had been living incognito with his family in Macau for some three years.

South Korean television and the South China Morning Post reported in 2007 that Kim Jong-nam had a Portuguese passport. However, Portuguese authorities and the Portuguese consul in Macau, Pedro Moitinho de Almeida, stated that if Kim had such a document, it would be a forgery.

In January 2009, Kim Jong-nam said that he had "no interest" in taking power in North Korea after his father, stating that it is only for his father to decide.

In June 2010, Kim Jong-nam gave a brief interview to the Associated Press in Macau while waiting for a hotel elevator. He said that he had "no plans" to defect to Europe, as the press had recently rumored. He lived in an apartment on the southern tip of Macau's Coloane Island until 2007. An anonymous South Korean official reported in October 2010 that Kim Jong-nam had not lived in Macau for "months", and shuttled between China and "another country".

In late September 2010, his younger half-brother Kim Jong Un was made heir apparent. Kim Jong Un was declared Supreme Leader of North Korea on 24 December 2011 after the death of Kim Jong Il. The two half-brothers had never met because of the ancient practice of raising potential successors separately.

On 1 January 2012, it was reported that Kim Jong-nam secretly flew to Pyongyang from Macau on 17 December 2011, after learning about his father's death that day and was presumed to have accompanied Kim Jong Un when paying his last respects to their father. He left after a few days to return to Macau and was not in attendance at the funeral to avoid speculation about the succession.

On 14 January 2012, Kim Jong-nam was seen in Beijing waiting for an Air China flight to Macau. He confirmed his identity to a group of South Koreans, which included a professor at Incheon University and told them that he usually travels alone.

In a book released in 2012 titled My Father, Kim Jong Il, and me by Japanese journalist Gomi Yōji who had interviewed him on numerous occasions, Kim Jong-nam said that he expected the leadership of Kim Jong Un to fail, citing that he was too inexperienced and young. He also stated, reportedly, that "[w]ithout reforms, North Korea will collapse, and when such changes take place, the regime will collapse".

According to South Korean intelligence sources, Kim Jong Un had issued a standing order to have his half-brother killed. In 2012, there was another assassination attempt on Kim Jong-nam, then later that year he sent a letter to Kim Jong Un, begging for his life. In late 2012, he appeared in Singapore one year after leaving Macau. He left Macau on suspicions that he was being targeted for assassination by Kim Jong Un; South Korean authorities had formerly indicted a North Korean agent, Kim Yong-su, who confessed to planning an attack on Kim Jong-nam in July 2010.

On 10 June 2019, the Wall Street Journal, citing anonymous former US officials, claimed that Kim Jong-nam might have been a CIA source. A book by Anna Fifield, Washington Post bureau chief in Beijing, had earlier reported this, stating that he had been previously filmed abroad with a US intelligence agent, and had carried a backpack containing $120,000 in cash.

== Assassination ==
On 13 February 2017, Kim Jong-nam died after being exposed to VX nerve agent at Kuala Lumpur International Airport in Malaysia. It is widely believed that he was killed on the orders of his half-brother Kim Jong Un. Four North Korean suspects left the airport shortly after the attack, traveling back to Pyongyang.

An Indonesian woman, Siti Aisyah, and a Vietnamese woman, Đoàn Thị Hương, were charged with murder but said they thought they were taking part in a TV prank. In March 2019, Siti Aisyah was freed after the charge against her was dropped. In April, the murder charge against Hương was also dropped, and she pleaded guilty to the lesser charge of "voluntarily causing hurt by dangerous weapons or means". She was sentenced to three years and four months in prison, but received a one-third reduction in her term, and was released on 3 May 2019.

Since his assassination, his son Kim Han-sol has been under the protective custody of the United States Central Intelligence Agency and is reportedly living in the United States.

== Personal life ==
It has been reported that Kim Jong-nam had two wives, and one mistress, and had at least six children. His first wife, Shin Jong-hui (born c. 1980), lived at a home called Dragon Villa on the northern outskirts of Beijing. His second wife, Lee Hye-kyong (born c. 1970), their son Han-sol (born 1995), and their daughter Sol-hui (born c. 1998) lived in a modest 12-story apartment building in Macau; his mistress, former Air Koryo flight attendant So Yong-la (born c. 1980), also lived in Macau.

He had several tattoos, including two of dragons.

Select (Note: To keep the tree of manageable size, it omits five out of the seven known legitimate children of Kim Il Sung. Other children not shown in the tree are: Kim Man-il (1944–1947; child of Kim Jong-suk), Kim Kyong-jin (born 1952; child of Kim Song-ae), Kim Yong-il (1955–2000; child of Kim Song-ae), and Kim Kyong-suk (born 1951; child of Kim Song-ae). A stillborn daughter is also omitted. Kim Il Sung was reported to have had other children with women who he was not married to; they included Kim Hyŏn-nam (born 1972). Also, only some of the descendants of Kim Jong Il and Kim Jong Un (Kim Il Sung's successors) are included.) family tree of North Korea's ruling Kim family (Note: Korean names often have a variety of transliterations into English, which can be confusing. For example, "Kim Jong Chul" may also be written "Gim Jeong-cheol" or "Kim Jŏng-ch'ŏl" among many other variations. See Korean romanization for more information.) (Note: Huss, Kan; Frost, Clay. "North Korea's First Family: Mapping the personal and political drama of the Kim clan". msnbc.com. Archived from the original on 4 February 2012. (Confirms many, but not all, of the birth and death years. See individual articles for more references.))

Kim Song-ryeong; 1810–1899
Kim Ŭngu; 1848–1878
Kim Pohyŏn; 1871–1955
Kim Hyong-jik; 1894–1926	Kang Pan Sok; 1892–1932
Kim Jong-suk; 1917–1949	Kim Il Sung; 1912–1994	Kim Song-ae; 1924–2014	Kim Yong-ju; 1920–2021
Kim Young-sook; 1947–	Song Hye-rim; 1937–2002	Kim Jong Il; 1941? (Note: Official North Korean biographies of Kim Jong Il list his birth year as 1942. The Korean calendar is based upon the Chinese zodiac which is believed to characterize one's personality. The year 1942 (Year of the Horse), in addition to being 30 years since Kim Il Sung's birth may be viewed as a better year than others, thus creating a motive to lie about a birth year.)–2011	Ko Yong-hui; 1952–2004	Kim Ok; 1964–	Kim Kyong-hui; 1946–	Jang Song-thaek; 1946–2013	Kim Pyong Il; 1954–
Kim Sol-song; 1974–	Kim Jong-nam; 1971–2017	Kim Jong Chul; 1981–	Kim Jong Un; 1983? (Note: Official North Korean biographies of Kim Jong Un list his birth year as 1982. The Korean calendar is based upon the Chinese zodiac which is believed to characterize one's personality. The year 1982 (Year of the Dog), in addition to being 70 years since Kim Il Sung's birth, may be viewed as a better year than others, thus creating a motive to lie about a birth year.)–	Ri Sol-ju c. 1986–	Kim Yo Jong; 1987–
Kim Han-sol; 1995–	Kim Ju Ae c. 2012 (Note: Birth year for Kim Ju Ae is not publicly known. She may have been born in either late 2012 or early 2013.)–

== See also ==
- Foreign relations of North Korea
- Outline of North Korea
- Politics of North Korea
