= Hong Il-chon =

First wife of Kim Jong Il

- Born: 1942 (age 82–83); Pyongyang, Heian'nan Province, Korea, Empire of Japan
- Spouse: Kim Jong Il (m. 1966; div. 1969)
- Children: Kim Hye-kyung

Korean name
- Hangul: 홍일천
- Hanja: 洪一天
- RR: Hong Ilcheon
- MR: Hong Ilch'ŏn

Hong Il-chon (Korean: 홍일천; born 1942) is a North Korean educator. She was the first wife of Kim Jong Il. She was the daughter of a soldier who died during the Korean War. In the early 1960s, Kim Il Sung, father of Kim Jong Il, introduced her to his son and handpicked her to marry him in 1966. Her only child, daughter Kim Hye-kyung, was born in 1968, and is the first child of Kim Jong Il. They divorced in 1969.

Hong Il-chon held a degree in Russian Literature from Kim Il Sung University. After her divorce from Kim Jong Il, she was still active in politics and educational affairs. She became one of the members of the Supreme People's Assembly during the period between 1977 and 1991. After she withdrew from the Assembly, she was appointed as principal of Kim Hyong Jik University of Education in September 1991. She retired from that post in July 2012 at the age of 70.
