= 2009 North Korean currency reform =

In 2009, the North Korean government announced a reform of the North Korean won, aiming to strengthen domestic economic control and curb any signs of a market economy. The currency reform is considered a failure, leading to a major depreciation for the currency and sparking panic throughout North Korea.

== The events ==
On 30 November 2009, the North Korean government suddenly announced that it would fully implement currency reform and revalue the North Korean won starting from 1 December. The original 100 won would be changed to 1 won, and each household was limited to exchanging 100,000 old won. Later, due to public protests, the authorities raised the exchange limit to 150,000 won in cash and 300,000 won in bank deposits. This reform was the first since 1992. Due to the highly centralized planned economy in North Korea, the currency reform led to the inability to sell goods before the state determined prices. In addition, the currency was not trusted, and the public panicked and exchanged foreign currency under the devaluation, which in turn affected the need to revalue goods, resulting in a vicious cycle that caused economic chaos. According to the Yonhap News Agency, Pyongyang residents rushed to the blackmarkets to convert their bills to the United States dollar and Chinese renminbi. The design of the new banknotes was displayed in the Choson Sinbo published in Tokyo on 4 December, and it was pointed out that the North Korean authorities reformed the currency in order to suppress the market economy and cause merchants to lose their property.

According to Yonhap News Agency and aid organizations, the North Korean won depreciated by 96% against the United States dollar within a week after the currency reform, and the price of rice rose from 17 won to 50 won per kilogram in three days. On the other hand, on 4 December, two vendors in Pyeongsang were shot on the spot by police officers for providing black market currency exchange; riots also broke out in markets in North Hamgyong Province, and twelve people were executed. Due to the complete failure of the currency reform, the North Korean new currency continued to depreciate rapidly, and all kinds of goods in the market were available but not sold, and the economy was on the verge of collapse. After the failure of the North Korean currency reform in 2009 led to economic paralysis, Pak Nam-gi, the former Minister of Planning and Finance of the Workers' Party of Korea, was dismissed for leading the currency reform. On 18 March 2010, Yonhap News Agency quoted several sources in North Korea as saying that Pak Nam-gi had been executed in the Sunan area of Pyongyang on charges of "infiltrating the revolutionary ranks as the son of a large landowner and deliberately destroying the national economy" However, "North Korean elites and ordinary people almost did not believe Pak Nam-gi's charges. Most believed that Pak Nam-gi was a scapegoat for the North Korean leadership.
