= General Secretary Kim =

General Secretary Kim may refer to:

- Kim Il Sung (1912–1994), former General Secretary of the Workers' Party of Korea (1966–1994)
- Kim Jong Il (1941–2011), former General Secretary of the Workers' Party of Korea (1997–2011)
- Kim Jong Un (1984- ), current General Secretary of the Workers' Party of Korea (2021-)
