= Song Hye-rim =

Actress, mistress of Kim Jong Il (1939–2002)

- 성혜림
- Born: 24 January 1939; Changnyeong, Korea, Empire of Japan
- Died: 18 May 2002 (aged 63); Moscow, Russia
- Partner: Kim Jong Il (1968–2002; her death)
- Children: 2, including Kim Jong-nam
- Relatives: Seong Hye-rang (sister); Yi Han-yong (nephew)

Korean name
- Hangul: 성혜림
- Hanja: 成蕙琳
- RR: Seong Hyerim
- MR: Sŏng Hyerim

Song Hye-rim (Korean: 성혜림; 24 January 1939 – 18 May 2002) was a North Korean actress, best known for being the one-time favored mistress of Kim Jong Il.

== Early life and education ==
Song was born in Changnyeong, Keishōnan Province, Korea, Empire of Japan (now in South Gyeongsang Province, South Korea). She entered the Pyongyang Movie College in 1955, but left in 1957 to give birth to a daughter. She later re-enrolled and graduated, having her film debut in 1959. She became a popular actress in the 1960s, appearing in movies including Onjŏngryŏng (온정령) and Baek Il-hong (백일홍).

Most accounts of Song are drawn from the memoirs of her sister, Song Hye-rang. Her former friend Kim Young-soon published her memoir I was Song Hye-rim's Friend, and revealed that she and her family were sent to a concentration camp for ten years after she found out Hye-rim's secret, namely, that she was Kim Jong Il's mistress, a fact that was hidden at the time even from Kim Il Sung. This resulted in the death of her parents and children, and her husband was taken away to never be seen again. She was rumored to have defected to South Korea in 2003.

== Personal life ==
Song began dating Kim Jong Il in 1968, after divorcing her first husband; she is believed to have been his first mistress. The birth of her son is said to have been kept secret from Kim Il Sung until 1975.

== Rumored defection and death ==
External image
- Song Hye-rim's grave at Troyekurovskoye Cemetery in Moscow.

Starting in the early 1980s, Song travelled to Moscow frequently for medical care. In 1996, Song was reported to have defected to the West, but intelligence officials in South Korea denied the story. She is reported to have died on 18 May 2002. Some reports state she died in Moscow.

== See also ==
- History of North Korea
- Woo In-hee – Actress, mistress of Kim Jong Il (c. 1940–1981)
