= Kim Jong Il =

Leader of North Korea from 1994 to 2011

Eternal Leader Kim Jong Il
- 김정일
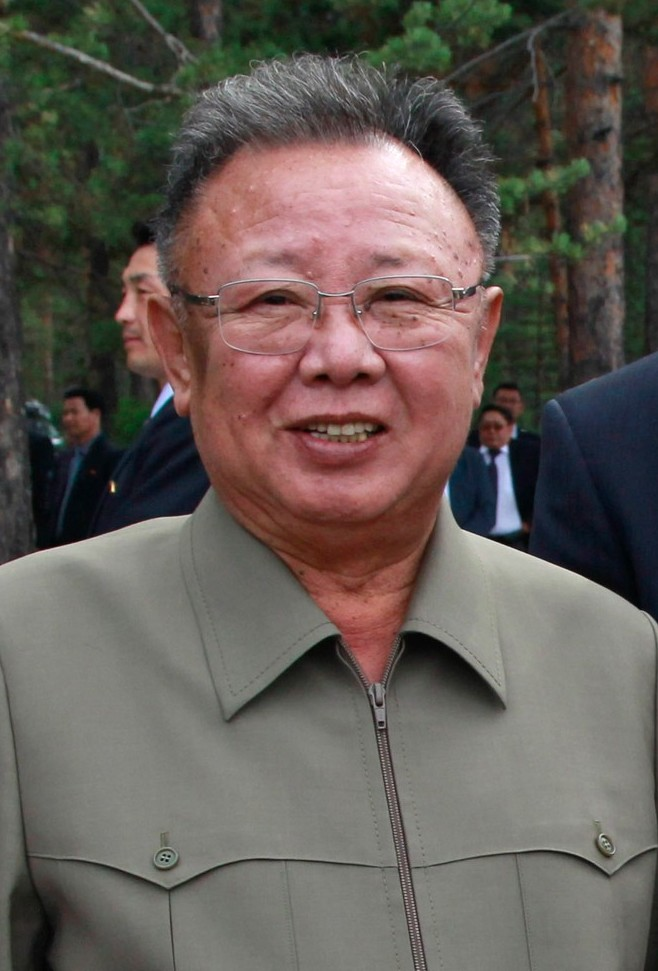
- Kim in August 2011

General Secretary of the Workers' Party of Korea
- In office 8 October 1997 – 17 December 2011
- Preceded by: Kim Il Sung
- Succeeded by: Kim Jong Un

Chairman of the National Defence Commission
- In office 9 April 1993 – 17 December 2011
- First Vice Chairman: O Jin-u; Jo Myong-rok
- Vice Chairman: Choe Kwang; Kim Il-chol; Ri Yong-mu; Yon Hyong-muk; Kim Yong-chun; O Kuk-ryol; Jang Song-thaek
- Preceded by: Kim Il Sung
- Succeeded by: Kim Jong Un (as First Chairman)

Chairman of the Central Military Commission
- In office 8 October 1997 – 17 December 2011
- Preceded by: Kim Il Sung
- Succeeded by: Kim Jong Un

Personal details
- Born: 16 February 1941 Voroshilov, Primorsky Krai, Soviet Union
- Died: 17 December 2011 (aged 70) Pyongyang, North Korea
- Resting place: Kumsusan Palace of the Sun
- Party: Workers' Party of Korea (1961–2011)
- Spouses: Hong Il-chon (m. 1966; div. 1969); Kim Young-sook (m. 1974)
- Domestic partners: Song Hye-rim (1968–2002); Ko Yong Hui (1977–2004); Kim Ok (2004–2011)
- Children: 6, including: Kim Jong-nam; Kim Sol-song; Kim Jong-chul; Kim Jong Un; Kim Yo Jong
- Parents: Kim Il Sung (father); Kim Jong-suk (mother)
- Relatives: Kim family
- Education: Mangyongdae Revolutionary School; Kim Il Sung University

Military service
- Allegiance: North Korea
- Branch/service: Korean People's Army
- Years of service: 1991–2011
- Rank: Taewonsu
- Commands: Supreme Commander

Korean name
- Hangul: 김정일
- Hanja: 金正日
- RR: Gim Jeongil
- MR: Kim Chŏngil
- IPA: [kim.dzɔŋ.il]
- Central institution membership: 1980–2011: Member, Presidium of the Political Bureau of the 6th Central Committee of the Workers' Party of Korea; 1974–2011: Member, Political Bureau of the 5th, 6th Central Committee of the Workers' Party of Korea; 1972–1997: Secretariat of the Workers' Party of Korea; 1972–2011: Member, 5th, 6th Central Committee of the Workers' Party of Korea; 1982–2011: Deputy, 7th, 8th, 9th, 10th, 11th, 12th Supreme People's Assembly; Other offices held: 1997–2011: Chairman, Central Military Commission of the Workers' Party of Korea; 1980–1997: Member, Central Military Commission of the Workers' Party of Korea; 1990–1993: First Vice Chairman, National Defense Commission; Supreme Leader of North Korea: ← Kim Il Sung; Kim Jong Un →

Kim Jong Il (Note: Also transcribed as Kim Jong-il (/kɪm dʒɒŋˈɪl/; Korean: 김정일, Korean pronunciation: [kim.dzɔŋ.il]; (Note: The given name Jong Il is pronounced [tsɔŋ.il] in isolation.)) (16 February 1941 – 17 December 2011) was a North Korean politician and dictator who was the second supreme leader of North Korea from the death of his father Kim Il Sung in 1994 until his own death in 2011. Posthumously, Kim Jong Il was declared an eternal leader of the Workers' Party of Korea (WPK).

Kim was born in the far eastern region of the Soviet Union and moved to Pyongyang in 1945 following the end of Japanese rule. He joined the WPK in 1961 and rose through its ranks, joining the Propaganda and Agitation Department (PAD) in 1966. He was responsible for investigations following the Kapsan faction incident in 1967, and played a key role in the development of the Juche ideology, North Korean cult of personality and the Monolithic Ideological System. He became PAD director in 1973, and took an increasingly prominent role. He was formally designated as Kim Il Sung's successor in 1980 at the 6th Congress of the Workers' Party of Korea. Kim succeeded his father following his death in 1994. Kim was the General Secretary of the WPK, Member of WPK Presidium, Chairman of the WPK Central Military Commission, Chairman of the National Defence Commission (NDC) of North Korea and the Supreme Commander of the Korean People's Army (KPA), the fourth-largest standing army in the world.

Like his father, Kim ruled North Korea as a repressive and totalitarian dictatorship. (Note: Sources saying that Kim ruled North Korea as a totalitarian dictatorship.) Kim assumed leadership during a period of catastrophic economic crisis amidst the dissolution of the Soviet Union, on which it was heavily dependent for trade in food and other supplies, which brought a famine. While the famine had ended by the late 1990s, food scarcity continued to be a problem throughout his tenure. Kim strengthened the role of the military with his Songun ("military-first") policies, making the army the central organizer of civil society. Kim's rule also saw tentative economic reforms, including the opening of the Kaesong Industrial Region in 2003 as well as a failed currency reform in 2009. The relationship with South Korea initially improved due to the Sunshine Policy, culminating in Kim's meeting with South Korean president Kim Dae-jung in 2000, followed by a meeting with president Roh Moo-hyun in 2007. However, the relationship subsequently deteriorated in 2010 following the sinking of ROKS Cheonan and the bombardment of Yeonpyeong. Under his leadership, North Korea conducted its first nuclear test in 2006, becoming the world's ninth nuclear-armed state, followed by another nuclear test in 2009, leading to international sanctions against North Korea.

Following Kim's failure to appear at important public events in 2008, foreign observers assumed that Kim had either fallen seriously ill or died. After this point, Kim made efforts to promote his third son, Kim Jong Un as his successor, promoting him to high ranking posts in the WPK in 2010. On 19 December 2011, the North Korean government announced that he had died two days earlier. After his death, alongside "Eternal General Secretary" of the WPK, Kim Jong Il was declared "Eternal Chairman" of the National Defence Commission, in keeping with the tradition of establishing eternal posts for the dead members of the Kim family.

== Early life ==
=== Birth ===
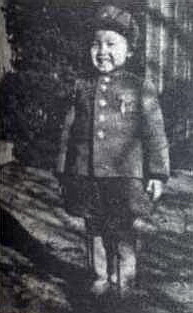
Kim Jong Il in 1947, at the age of six

In literature, it is assumed that Kim was born in 1941 in either the camp of Vyatskoye, near Khabarovsk, or camp Voroshilov near Nikolsk. According to Lim Jae Cheon, Kim cannot have been born in Vyatskoye as Kim Il Sung's war records show that he arrived at Vyatskoye only in July 1942 and had been living in Voroshilov before, thus Kim Jong Il is generally agreed to have been born in Voroshilov. Kim's mother, Kim Jong-suk, was Kim Il Sung's first wife. Inside his family, he was nicknamed "Yura", while his younger brother Kim Man-il (born Aleksandr Kim) was nicknamed "Shura". According to Fyodor Tertitskiy, it is a misconception that Kim was born as Yuri.

Kim's official biography states he was born in the Paektusan Secret Camp on Paektu Mountain in Korea under Japanese rule on 16 February 1942. According to one comrade of Kim's mother, Lee Min, word of Kim's birth first reached an army camp in Vyatskoye via radio and neither Kim nor his mother returned there until the following year. Kim Jong Suk died in 1949 from an ectopic pregnancy.

In 1945, Kim was four years old when World War II ended and Korea regained independence from Japan. His father returned to Pyongyang that September, and in late November Jong-Il returned to Korea via a Soviet ship, landing at Sonbong. The family moved into a former Japanese officer's mansion in Pyongyang, with a garden and pool. Kim's brother Man Il drowned there in 1948 under mysterious circumstances.

=== Education ===
According to his official biography, Kim completed the course of general education between September 1950 and August 1960. He attended Primary School No. 4 and Middle School No. 1 (Namsan Higher Middle School) in Pyongyang. This is contested by foreign academics, who believe he is more likely to have received his early education in China as a precaution to ensure his safety during the Korean War.

Throughout his schooling, Kim was involved in politics. He was active in the Korean Children's Union and the Democratic Youth League of North Korea (DYL), taking part in study groups of Marxist political theory and other literature. In September 1957, he became vice-chairman of his middle school's DYL branch (the chairman had to be a teacher). He pursued a programme of anti-factionalism and attempted to encourage greater ideological education among his classmates.

Kim is also said to have received English language education in Malta in the early 1970s on his infrequent holidays there as a guest of Prime Minister Dom Mintoff.

The elder Kim had meanwhile remarried and had another son, Kim Pyong Il. From 1988 to his retirement in 2019, Kim Pyong Il has served in a series of North Korean embassies in Europe and was the North Korean ambassador to Poland. Foreign commentators suspect that Kim Pyong Il was sent to these distant posts by his father in order to avoid a power struggle between his two sons. He is now reported to be back in North Korea.

== Ascension to power ==
=== Initial career ===
Kim Jong Il officially joined the Workers' Party of Korea in July 1961. He rose through the ranks during the 1960s, and benefited greatly from the Kapsan faction incident around 1967, which was the last credible challenge to Kim Il Sung's sole rule. This incident marked the first time Kim Jong Il was – at age 26 – given official duties by his father, when Jong Il took part in the investigation and purges that followed the incident. In addition, Kim Jong Il gave a speech at the plenum; it was his first as a figure of authority. Kim Jong Il's name was also mentioned in public documents, possibly for the first time, indicating that Kim Il Sung might have already planned for Jong Il to succeed him as leader.

Only six months later, in an unscheduled meeting of the party, Kim Il Sung called for loyalty in the film industry that had betrayed him with An Act of Sincerity. (Note: An Act of Sincerity, described variously as either a film or a stage play, was produced by Kim To-man after the death of Choe Chae-ryon, the wife of Kapsan Faction leader Pak Kum-chol. It portrayed Choe in a positive light and emphasized her devotion to her husband. Kim Il Sung disapproved of it and implied that it exhibited misplaced loyalty.) Kim Jong Il himself announced that he was up to the task and thus begun his influential career in North Korean filmmaking, during which he made significant efforts to further intensify the personality cult of his father and attach himself to it. In 1969, he produced a film adaptation of the North Korean opera Sea of Blood.

Kim Jong Il entered the WPK's Propaganda and Agitation Department (PAD) in February 1966. Kim Jong Il's years in the PAD were marked by his effort to become an expert in the field of propaganda. Kim Jong Il's main contribution in the department was to devise the "monolithic ideological system", later codified as the Ten Principles for the Establishment of a Monolithic Ideological System. Kim's various efforts greatly benefited the North Korean cult of personality. In 1969, he was appointed as the head of Kim Il Sung's personal guard. At the time of the 5th Congress of the WPK in 1970, Kim Jong Il reportedly suggested that everyone in the North Korea be mandated to wear badges with Kim Il Sung's portrait, which was subsequently adopted.

On 2 November 1971, the earliest document lauding Kim Jong Il was published, where he was called the "Adored Leader" by North Korea's musical ensembles. Kim Jong Il was elected to the Central Committee in 1972 and became its secretary the following year. He became the PAD's chief in 1973, a position which he held until 1985. During this time, the film director Choe Ik-gyu, a close confidant of his, also rose in the ranks of the PAD, becoming its vice director in 1972. Choe developed mass games, which would evolve into the Arirang Festival, The department was important because of its role in mass mobilization of the populace. Kim Jong Il was known as a great fan of music, film, and theater since young age and his position within the department was a natural fit.

However, when Kim Il Sung began to contemplate the succession question in the early 1970s, it did not seem certain that Kim Jong Il would be his successor. There was Kim's uncle, Kim Yong-ju, who was once believed to be Kim Il Sung's eventual successor but who had made several mistakes in the struggle for power, had serious flaws, and was becoming increasingly marginalized. Then there was the threat posed by his paternal half-brother, Kim Pyong Il, whose mother, Kim Song-ae, wished to place her son in line for succession instead of Jong Il. In 1973, Kim Jong Il developed the movie Our Family's Problem, which featured the evil wife who was manipulating a good official; this was seen as an indirect message by Jong Il to Il Sung regarding Song-ae.

Defector Hwang Jang Yop wrote in his memoirs,

[By early 1973] the power of the Central Committee of the Party was slowly being handed over to Kim Jong Il. Many people were becoming aware that Kim Jong Il was the successor. In North Korea, where pre-modern ideas of ancestry were overwhelming, many people had figured out that Kim Jong Il would be the successor. ... Some people were under the impression that first generation revolutionaries who had pursued the anti-Japan guerilla struggle alongside Kim Il Sung had picked Kim Jong Il as the successor, but that was not true. There was no-one among them who could suggest a successor. Even if there were someone, it would have been impossible had Kim Il Sung showed even a small sign of objection. ... [T]he succession became possible because the totalitarian dictatorship had become firm and prolonged. In other words, since Kim Il Sung lacked a modern sense of politics and was steeped in pre-modern thinking, he came up with the absurd idea of handing the country over to his son. In addition, Kim Jong Il himself was ambitious to succeed his father and made every effort to do so.

In February 1974, Kim Yong-ju was criticized by Kim Il Sung at the eighth plenum of the 5th Central Committee and demoted to vice-premier. Kim Yong-ju's allies were removed and eventually he was placed under house arrest, where he remained until 1993. At the same plenum, Kim Jong Il was formally proclaimed as the successor and became a member of the Political Council. In 1976, Kim Song-ae lost her position as chair of the Korean Democratic Women's Union, which was her vital power base. And in 1979, Kim Pyong Il began a series of diplomatic postings in Europe, arranged so as then he could not influence politics in North Korea. Kim Pyong Il only returned to North Korea in 2019.

According to Kim Jong Il's official biography, the Central Committee already appointed him successor to Kim Il Sung in 1974. The first public confirmation of Kim Jong Il's position as successor came in 1977, when in a booklet he was designated as Kim Il Sung's only heir. Initially, Kim was only referred as the "Party Centre" by official state publications sent abroad, though publications that were solely for a domestic audience had already started to use his name. In 1978, portraits of Kim Jong Il's position as heir apparent was briefly in doubt, with his portraits being taken down in barracks and mentions of "Party Centre" dropping, though by 1979, his position was back on track.

=== Heir apparent ===
By the time of the 6th Party Congress in October 1980, Kim's control of the Party operation was complete. He was given senior posts in the Presidium, the Military Commission and the party Secretariat. When he was made a member of the 7th Supreme People's Assembly in February 1982, international observers deemed him the heir apparent of North Korea. Prior to 1980, he had no public profile and was referred to only as the "Party Centre". At this time Kim assumed the title "Dear Leader" (친애하는 지도자; ch'inaehanŭn chidoja), and the government began building a personality cult around him patterned after that of his father, the "Great Leader". Kim was regularly hailed by the media as the "fearless leader" and "the great successor to the revolutionary cause". He emerged as the most powerful figure behind his father in North Korea.

By the 1980s, North Korea began to experience severe economic stagnation. Kim Il Sung's policy of Juche (self-reliance) cut the country off from almost all external trade, even with its traditional partners, the Soviet Union and China. South Korea accused Kim of ordering the 1983 bombing in Rangoon, Burma which killed 17 visiting South Korean officials, including four cabinet members, and another in 1987 which killed all 115 onboard Korean Air Flight 858. A North Korean agent, Kim Hyon Hui, confessed to planting a bomb in the case of the second, saying the operation was ordered by Kim personally. Starting from 1983, Kim Jong Il tasked South Korean filmmaker Shin Sang-ok and actress Choi Eun-hee, who were abducted by North Korean agents in 1978, to make films for him. On 24 December 1991, Kim was also named Supreme Commander of the Korean People's Army.

Defence Minister Oh Jin Wu, one of Kim Il Sung's most loyal subordinates, engineered Kim's acceptance by the Army as the next leader of North Korea, despite his lack of military service. In 1992, Kim Il Sung publicly stated that his son was in charge of all internal affairs in North Korea. In 1992, radio broadcasts started referring to him as the "Dear Father", instead of the "Dear Leader", suggesting a promotion. His 51st birthday in February was the occasion for massive celebrations, exceeded only by those for the 80th birthday of Kim Il Sung himself on 15 April that same year. In 1992, Kim made his first and only public speech during a military parade for the KPA's 60th anniversary and said: "Glory to the officers and soldiers of the heroic Korean People's Army!". These words were followed by a loud applause and cheers by the crowd at Pyongyang's Kim Il Sung Square where the parade was held. Kim was named Chairman of the National Defence Commission on 9 April 1993, making him day-to-day commander of the armed forces.

According to defector Hwang Jang Yop, the North Korean government system became even more centralized and autocratic during the 1980s and 1990s under Kim than it had been under his father. In one example explained by Hwang, although Kim Il Sung required his ministers to be loyal to him, he nonetheless frequently sought their advice during decision-making. In contrast, Kim Jong Il demanded absolute obedience and agreement from his ministers and party officials with no advice or compromise, and he viewed any slight deviation from his thinking as a sign of disloyalty. According to Hwang, Kim Jong Il personally directed even minor details of state affairs, such as the size of houses for party secretaries and the delivery of gifts to his subordinates.

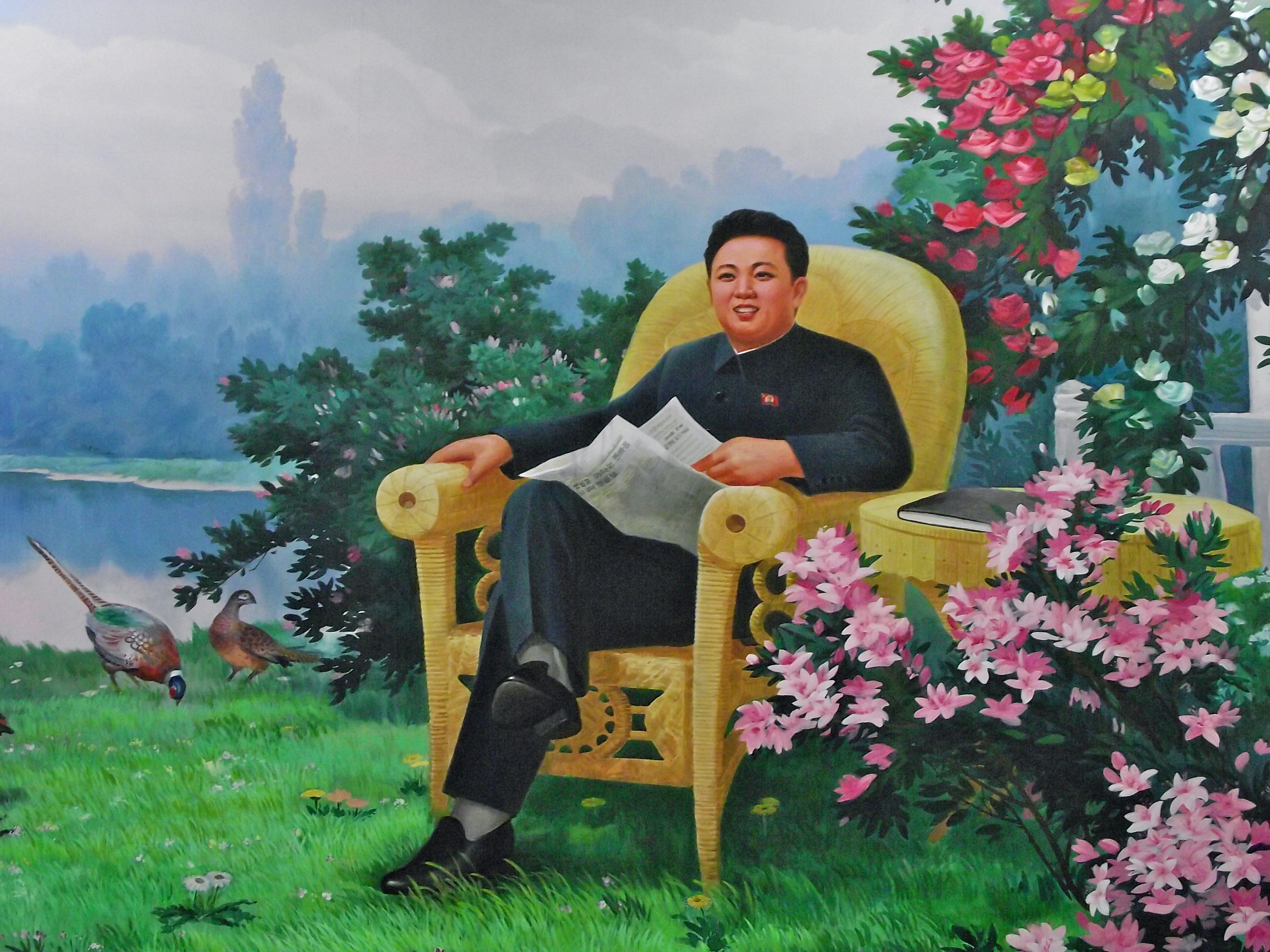
Idealized portrait of Kim Jong Il

== Leadership (1994–2011) ==
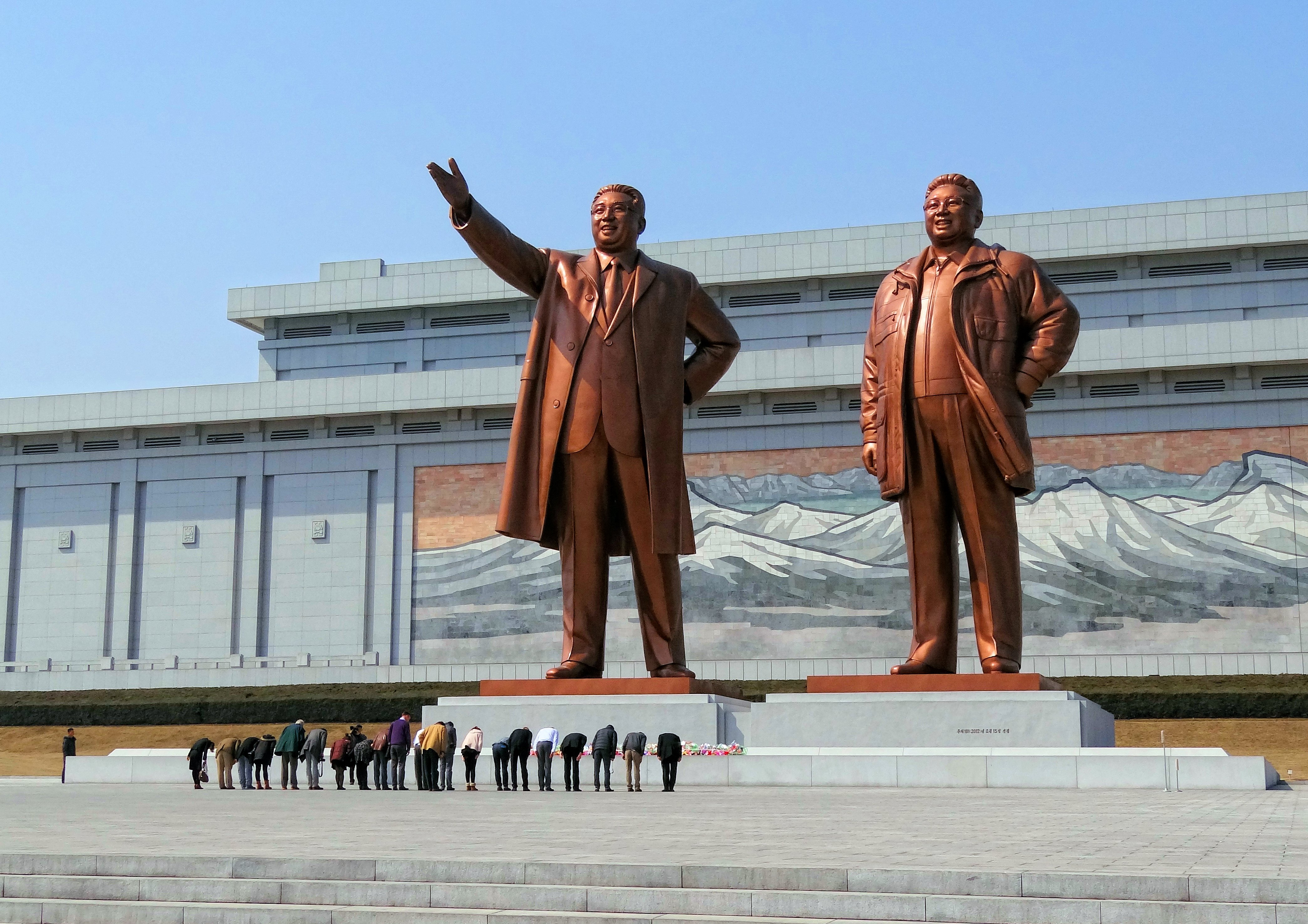
North Koreans bowing to the statues of Kim Jong Il and his father, Kim Il Sung, at the Mansu Hill Grand Monument

On 8 July 1994, Kim Il Sung died at the age of 82 from a heart attack. Kim Jong Il had been his father's designated successor as early as 1974, named commander-in-chief in 1991, and became Supreme Leader upon his father's death.

Party organizations in the Army, regional, and central governing institutions began to hold conferences, each of them adopting a resolution called "On the election of the Great Leader of our Party and the people – comrade Kim Jong Il – as the General Secretary of our Party." Based on the resolution, the Party Central Committee and the Central Military Commission proclaimed Kim Jong Il to be General Secretary of the Workers' Party of Korea on 8 October 1997. In 1998, he was re-elected as chairman of the National Defence Commission, and a constitutional amendment strengthened the role of National Defence Commission in the country's affairs. Also in 1998, the Supreme People's Assembly wrote the president's post out of the constitution and designated Kim Il Sung as the country's "Eternal President" in order to honor his memory forever.

As the Party General Secretary, Chairman of the National Defence Commission, and Supreme Commander of the Korean People's Army, Kim Jong Il exercised absolute control over the government and the country under the Songun system. Despite the official "leading role", the central organizations of the Workers Party of Korea have become dormant, with the real authority concentrated in the military-dominated National Defence Commission. At the same time, 1998 amendment restored the Cabinet of the DPRK as "organ of overall state administration", concentrating economic policy in that organ.

Although not required to stand for popular election to his key offices, he was unanimously elected to the Supreme People's Assembly every five years, representing a military constituency.

=== Economic policies ===
Kim had a "reputation for being almost comically incompetent in matters of economic management". The economy of North Korea struggled throughout the 1990s, primarily due to mismanagement. In addition, North Korea experienced severe floods in the mid-1990s, exacerbated by poor land management. This, compounded with the fact that only 18% of North Korea is arable land and the country's inability to import the goods necessary to sustain industry, led to a severe famine and left North Korea economically devastated. Faced with a country in decay, Kim adopted the Songun ("Military-First") policy and priority to science and technology as pillars of "Strong and Prosperous Nation" to strengthen the country and reinforce the regime. On the national scale, the Japanese Foreign Ministry acknowledges that this has resulted in a positive growth rate for the country since 1996, with the implementation of "landmark socialist-type market economic practices" in 2002, keeping the North afloat despite a continued dependency on foreign aid for food.

In the wake of the devastation of the 1990s, the government began formally approving some activity of small-scale bartering and trade. As observed by Daniel Sneider, associate director for research at the Stanford University Asia–Pacific Research Center, this flirtation with capitalism was "fairly limited, but – especially compared to the past – there are now remarkable markets that create the semblance of a free market system". In 2002, Kim declared that "money should be capable of measuring the worth of all commodities." These gestures toward economic reform mirror similar actions taken by China's Deng Xiaoping in the late 1980s and early 90s. During a rare visit in 2006, Kim expressed admiration for China's rapid economic progress. An unsuccessful devaluation of the North Korean won in 2009, initiated or approved by Kim personally, caused brief economic chaos and protests and uncovered the vulnerability of the country's societal fabric in the face of crisis.

=== Domestic policy ===
In 1996, in an attempt to evade his government's responsibility for the 1990s famine, Kim Jong Il launched a large-scale purge campaign named the Deepening Group Incident, establishing a secret police organisation called the Simhwajo (Deepening Group). Kim appointed Jang Sung-taek (then deputy director of the Organization and Guidance Department), to lead the group, which then carried out a great purge by making some senior officials, close aides, and their relatives scapegoats for the economic crisis and famine. Some 25,000 people are thought to have been purged of whom approximately 10,000 were executed, and about 15,000 sent to concentration camps. Kim Jong Il unconditionally signed the list of executions put up by the deepening group. In 1998, due to the incidents that occurred at the Hwanghae Steel Works in South Hwanghae Province, Kim Jong Il is said to have feared alienation from the public, and started an investigation into Simhwajo, leading to its dismantlement (in this form) in 2000 and to further purges.

=== Foreign relations ===
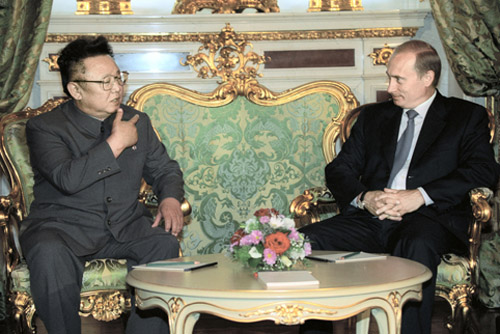
Kim talking with Russian president Vladimir Putin during his 2001 meeting in Moscow

Kim was known as a skilled and manipulative diplomat. In 1998, South Korean President Kim Dae-jung implemented the "Sunshine Policy" to improve North-South relations and to allow South Korean companies to start projects in the North. Kim announced plans to import and develop new technologies to develop North Korea's fledgling software industry. As a result of the new policy, the Kaesong Industrial Park was constructed in 2003 just north of the demilitarized zone.

Nonetheless, regular skirmishes broke out between the two Koreas, including the Gangneung incident in 1996, the Sokcho incident and Yeosu incident in 1998 and the Battles of Yeonpyeong in 1999 and 2002. The most serious conflict took place in 2010, with the sinking of ROKS Cheonan and the bombardment of Yeonpyeong, which effectively killed the Sunshine Policy.

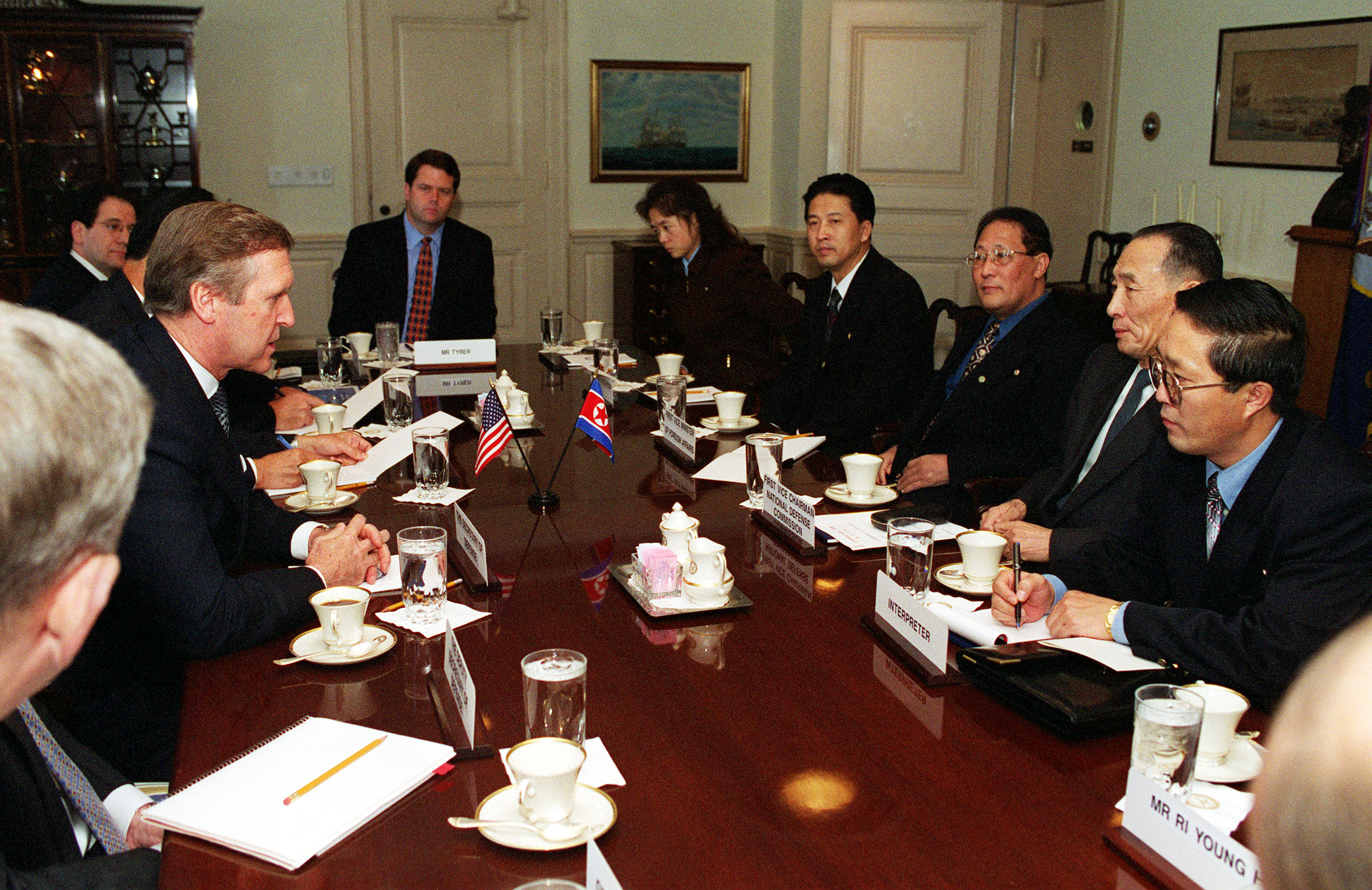
Kim Ok, Kim's personal secretary, with U.S. Secretary of Defense William Cohen, 2000

In a meeting with Japanese prime minister Junichiro Koizumi in September 2002, Kim publicly admitted to the kidnapping of at least 13 Japanese citizens by North Korea since the 1970s. According to Russian scholar Andrei Lankov, the North Korean disclosure was met with outrage within both the Japanese government and the general public, as the allegations that were previously thought of as conspiracy theories had proved to be true.

=== Nuclear program ===
In 1994, North Korea and the United States signed an Agreed Framework which was designed to freeze and eventually dismantle the North's nuclear weapons program in exchange for aid in producing two power-generating nuclear reactors and the assurance that it would not be invaded again. In 2000, after a meeting with Madeleine Albright, he agreed to a moratorium on missile construction.

In 2002, Kim's government admitted to having produced nuclear weapons in violation of the 1994 agreement. Kim's regime argued the secret production was necessary for security purposes – citing the presence of United States-owned nuclear weapons in South Korea and the new tensions with the United States under President George W. Bush after the axis of evil speech. On 9 October 2006, North Korea's Korean Central News Agency announced that it had successfully conducted an underground nuclear test. In 2009, a second nuclear test was conducted.

=== Cult of personality ===
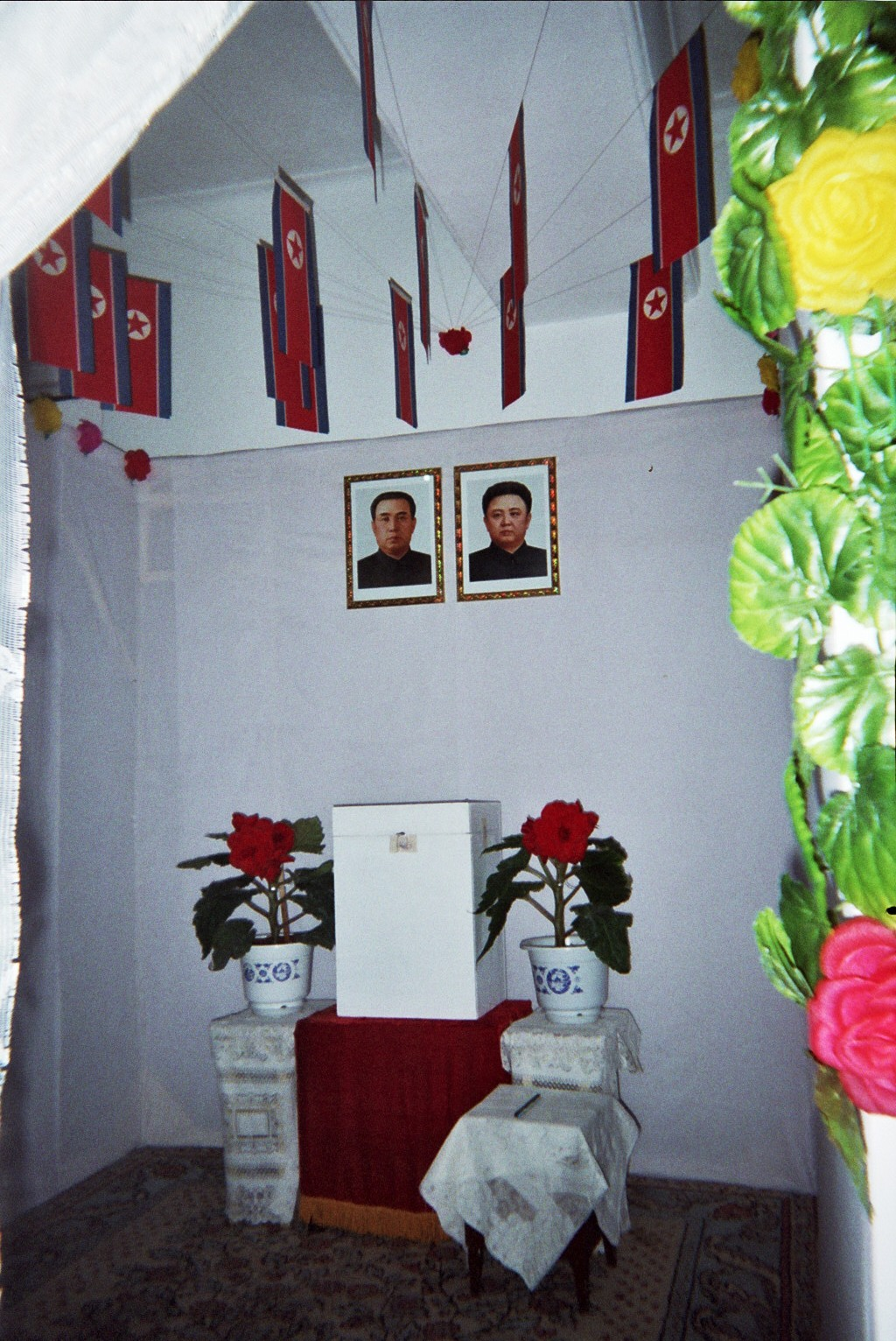
A North Korean voting booth containing portraits of Kim Il Sung and Kim Jong Il under the national flag (below the portraits is the ballot box)

Kim was the focus of a personality cult inherited from his father and founder of the DPRK, Kim Il Sung. Kim Jong Il was often the centre of attention throughout ordinary life in the DPRK. On his 60th birthday (based on his official date of birth), mass celebrations occurred throughout the country on the occasion of his Hwangap. In 2010, the North Korean media reported that Kim's distinctive clothing had set worldwide fashion trends.

The prevailing point of view is that the people's adherence to Kim's cult of personality was solely out of respect for Kim Il Sung or out of fear of punishment for failure to pay homage. Media and government sources from outside North Korea generally support this view, while North Korean government sources aver that it was genuine hero worship. The song "No Motherland Without You", sung by the KPA State Merited Choir, was created especially for Kim in 1992 and was frequently broadcast on the radio, television, and from loudspeakers on the streets of Pyongyang.

=== Human rights record ===
According to a 2004 Human Rights Watch report, the North Korean government under Kim was "among the world's most repressive governments", having up to 200,000 political prisoners according to U.S. and South Korean officials, with no freedom of the press or religion, political opposition or equal education: "Virtually every aspect of political, social, and economic life is controlled by the government."

Kim's government was accused of "crimes against humanity" for its alleged culpability in creating and prolonging the 1990s famine. Human Rights Watch characterized him as a dictator and accused him of human rights violations. Amnesty International condemned him for leaving 'millions of North Koreans mired in poverty' and detaining hundreds of thousands of people in prison camps.

Kim Jong Il claimed that the barometer for distinguishing whether a person can be deemed a member of North Korean society and hence entitled to rights 'lies not on the grounds of his social class but on the grounds of his ideology'.

=== Health and rumours of waning power ===
In an August 2008 issue of the Japanese newsweekly Shūkan Gendai, Waseda University professor Toshimitsu Shigemura, an authority on the Korean Peninsula, claimed that Kim died of diabetes in late 2003 and had been replaced in public appearances by one or more stand-ins previously employed to protect him from assassination attempts. In a subsequent best-selling book, The True Character of Kim Jong Il, Shigemura cited apparently unnamed people close to Kim's family along with Japanese and South Korean intelligence sources, claiming they confirmed Kim's diabetes took a turn for the worse early in 2000 and from then until his supposed death three-and-a-half years later he was using a wheelchair. Shigemura moreover claimed a voiceprint analysis of Kim speaking in 2004 did not match a known earlier recording. It was also noted that Kim did not appear in public for the Olympic torch relay in Pyongyang on 28 April 2008. The question had reportedly "baffled foreign intelligence agencies for years".

On 9 September 2008, various sources reported that after he did not show up that day for a military parade celebrating North Korea's 60th anniversary, United States intelligence agencies believed Kim might be "gravely ill" after having suffered a stroke. He had last been seen in public a month earlier.

A former Central Intelligence Agency official said earlier reports of a health crisis were likely accurate. North Korean media remained silent on the issue. An Associated Press report said analysts believed Kim had been supporting moderates in the foreign ministry, while North Korea's powerful military was against so-called "Six-Party" negotiations with China, Japan, Russia, South Korea, and the United States aimed towards ridding North Korea of nuclear weapons. Some United States officials noted that soon after rumours about Kim's health were publicized a month before, North Korea had taken a "tougher line in nuclear negotiations". In late August North Korea's official news agency reported the government would "consider soon a step to restore the nuclear facilities in Nyongbyon to their original state as strongly requested by its relevant institutions". Analysts said this meant "the military may have taken the upper hand and that Kim might no longer be wielding absolute authority".

By 10 September, there were conflicting reports. Unidentified South Korean government officials said Kim had undergone surgery after suffering a minor stroke and had apparently "intended to attend 9 September event in the afternoon but decided not to because of the aftermath of the surgery". Kim Yong Nam said, "While we wanted to celebrate the 60th anniversary of the country with general secretary Kim Jong Il, we celebrated on our own". Song Il Ho, North Korea's ambassador said, "We see such reports as not only worthless, but rather as a conspiracy plot". Seoul's Chosun Ilbo newspaper reported that "the South Korean embassy in Beijing had received an intelligence report that Kim collapsed on 22 August". The New York Times reported on 9 September that Kim was "very ill and most likely suffered a stroke a few weeks ago, but United States intelligence authorities do not think his death is imminent". The BBC noted that the North Korean government denied these reports, stating that Kim's health problems were "not serious enough to threaten his life", although they did confirm that he had suffered a stroke on 15 August.

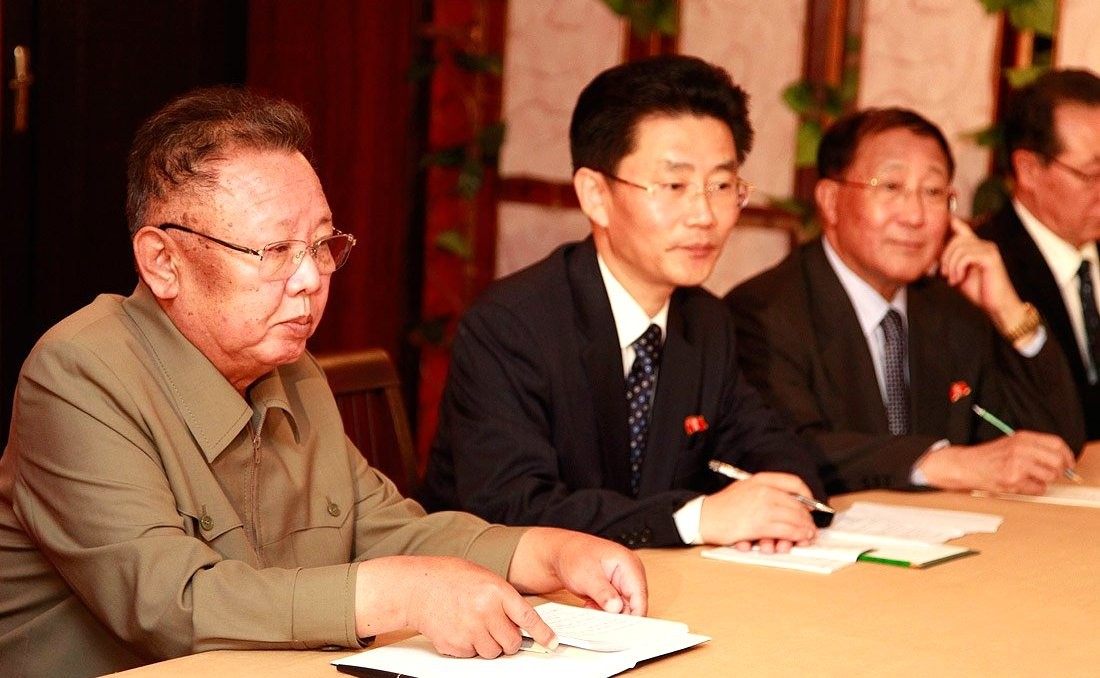
Kim at a meeting during his visit with Dmitry Medvedev in August 2011

Japan's Kyodo News agency reported on 14 September, that "Kim collapsed on 14 August due to stroke or a cerebral hemorrhage, and that Beijing dispatched five military doctors at the request of Pyongyang. Kim will require a long period of rest and rehabilitation before he fully recovers and has complete command of his limbs again, as with typical stroke victims". Japan's Mainichi Shimbun claimed Kim had occasionally lost consciousness since April. Japan's Tokyo Shimbun on 15 September, added that Kim was staying at the Bongwha State Guest House. He was apparently conscious "but he needs some time to recuperate from the recent stroke, with some parts of his hands and feet paralyzed". It cited Chinese sources which claimed that one cause for the stroke could have been stress brought about by the United States delay to remove North Korea from its list of state sponsors of terrorism.

On 19 October, North Korea reportedly ordered its diplomats to stay near their embassies to await "an important message", according to Japan's Yomiuri Shimbun, setting off renewed speculation about the health of the ailing leader.

By 29 October 2008, reports stated Kim suffered a serious setback and had been taken back to the hospital. The New York Times reported that Japanese prime minister Taro Aso, on 28 October 2008, stated in a parliamentary session that Kim had been hospitalized: "His condition is not so good. However, I don't think he is totally incapable of making decisions". Aso further said a French neurosurgeon was aboard a plane for Beijing, en route to North Korea. Further, Kim Sung-ho, director of South Korea's National Intelligence Service, told lawmakers in a closed parliamentary session in Seoul that "Kim appeared to be recovering quickly enough to start performing his daily duties".

The Dong-A Ilbo newspaper reported "a serious problem" with Kim's health. Japan's Fuji Television network reported that Kim's eldest son, Kim Jong-nam, traveled to Paris to hire a neurosurgeon for his father, and showed footage where the surgeon boarded flight CA121 bound for Pyongyang from Beijing on 24 October. The French weekly Le Point identified him as Francois-Xavier Roux, neurosurgery director of Paris' Sainte-Anne Hospital, but Roux himself stated he was in Beijing for several days and not North Korea. On 19 December 2011, Roux confirmed that Kim suffered a debilitating stroke in 2008 and was treated by himself and other French doctors at Pyongyang's Red Cross Hospital. Roux said Kim suffered few lasting effects.

On 5 November 2008, the North's Korean Central News Agency published 2 photos showing Kim posing with dozens of Korean People's Army (KPA) soldiers on a visit to military Unit 2200 and sub-unit of Unit 534. Shown with his usual bouffant hairstyle, with his trademark sunglasses and a white winter parka, Kim stood in front of trees with autumn foliage and a red-and-white banner. The Times questioned the authenticity of at least one of these photos.

In November 2008, Japan's TBS TV network reported that Kim had suffered a second stroke in October, which "affected the movement of his left arm and leg and also his ability to speak". However, South Korea's intelligence agency rejected this report.

In response to the rumors regarding Kim's health and supposed loss of power, in April 2009, North Korea released a video showing Kim visiting factories and other places around the country between November and December 2008. In 2010, leaked diplomatic cables purportedly attested that Kim suffered from epilepsy.

According to The Daily Telegraph, Kim was a chain-smoker.

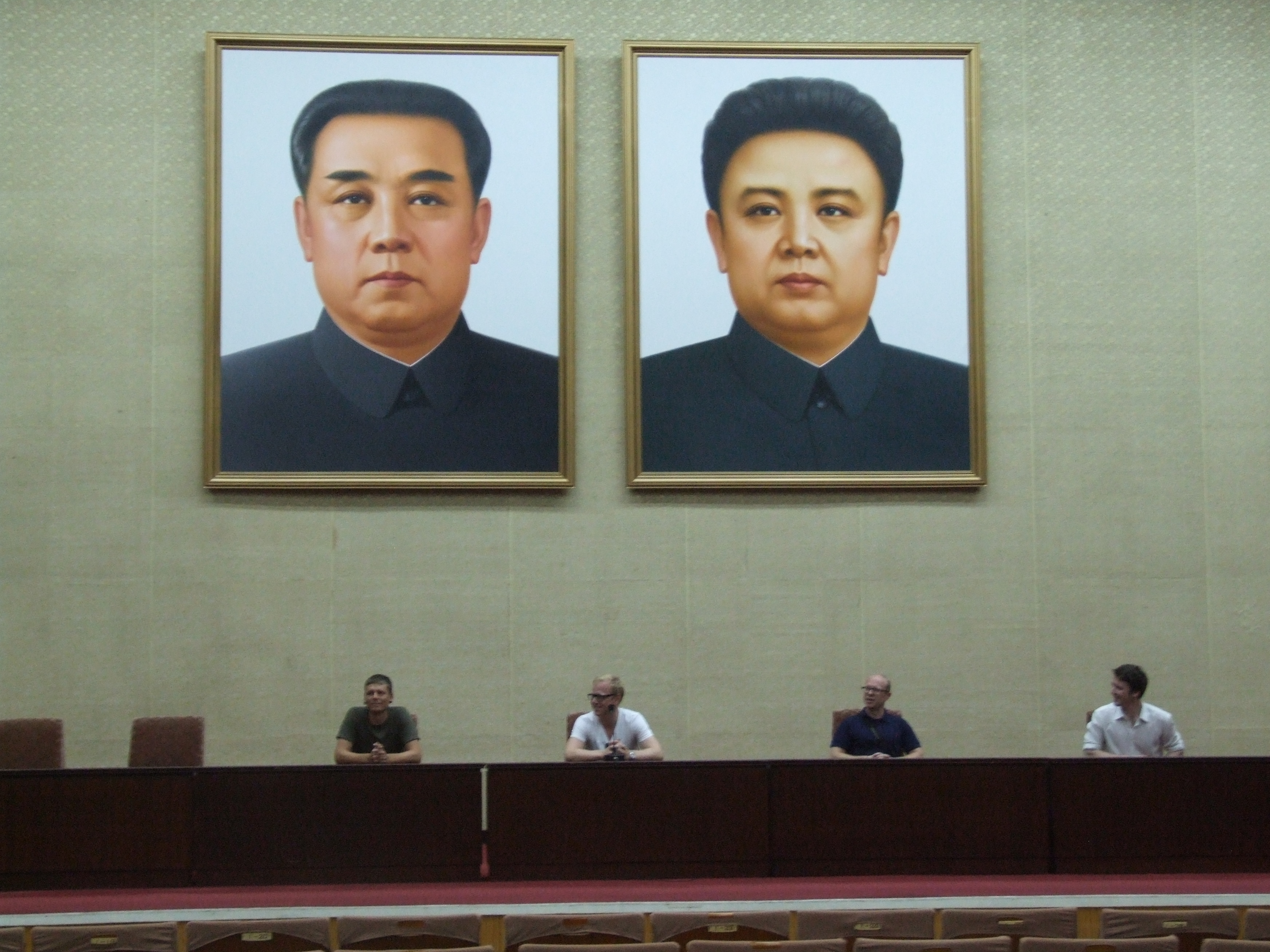
Portraits of Kim Jong Il and his father in the Grand People's Study House in Pyongyang

=== Successor ===
Kim's three sons and his brother-in-law, along with O Kuk Ryol, an army general, had been noted as possible successors, but the North Korean government had for a time been wholly silent on this matter.

Kim Yong Hyun, a political expert at the Institute for North Korean Studies at Seoul's Dongguk University, said in 2007: "Even the North Korean establishment would not advocate a continuation of the family dynasty at this point". Kim's eldest son Kim Jong-nam was earlier believed to be the designated heir but he appeared to have fallen out of favor after being arrested at Narita International Airport near Tokyo in 2001 where he was caught attempting to enter Japan on a fake passport to visit Tokyo Disneyland.

On 9 April 2009, Kim was re-elected as chairman of the National Defence Commission and made an appearance at the Supreme People's Assembly. This was the first time Kim was seen in public since August 2008. He was unanimously re-elected and given a standing ovation. On 2 June 2009, it was reported that Kim's youngest son, Kim Jong Un, was to be North Korea's next leader. Like his father and grandfather, he has also been given an official sobriquet, The Young General (청년대장). Prior to his death, it had been reported that Kim was expected to officially designate the son as his successor in 2012. On 28 September 2010, at the 3rd Conference of the WPK, Kim Jong Il was re-elected as General Secretary of the Workers' Party of Korea. At the same time, Kim Jong Un was elected as Vice Chairman of the Central Military Commission of the WPK and the Central Committee.

=== 2010 and 2011 foreign visits ===
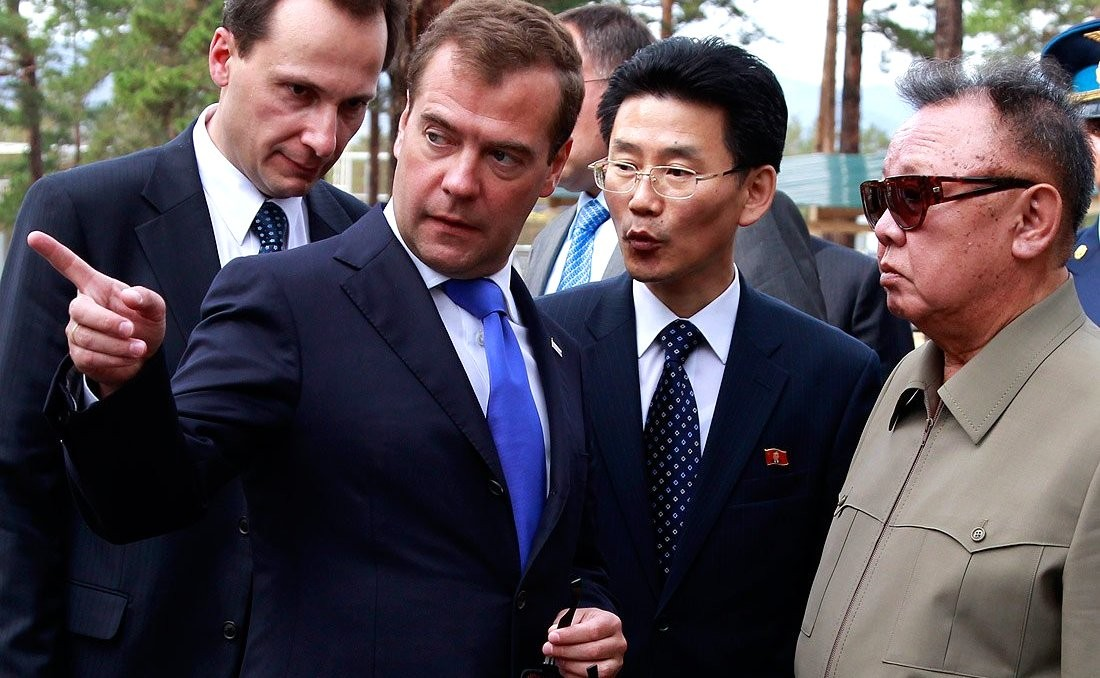
Kim with Russian president Dmitry Medvedev in Sosnovy-Bor Military garrison, Zaigrayevsky District Buriatya on 24 August 2011

Kim reportedly visited the People's Republic of China in May 2010. He entered the country via his personal train on 3 May and stayed in a hotel in Dalian. In May 2010, Assistant U.S. Secretary of State for East Asian and Pacific Affairs Kurt Campbell told South Korean officials that Kim had only three years to live, according to medical information that had been compiled. Kim travelled to China again in August 2010, this time with his son, fueling speculation at the time that he was ready to hand over power to his son, Kim Jong Un.

He returned to China again in May 2011, marking the 50th anniversary of the signing of the Treaty of Friendship, Cooperation and Mutual Assistance between China and the DPRK. In late August 2011, he traveled by train to the Russian Far East to meet with President Dmitry Medvedev for unspecified talks. There were speculations that the visits of Kim abroad in 2010 and 2011 were a sign of his improving health and a possible slowdown in succession might follow. After the visit to Russia, Kim appeared in a military parade in Pyongyang on 9 September, accompanied by Kim Jong Un.

== Death ==
The official posthumous portrait of Kim Jong Il, issued after his death

It was reported that Kim had died of a suspected heart attack on 17 December 2011 at 8:30 am while travelling by train to an area outside Pyongyang. He was succeeded by his youngest son Kim Jong Un, who was hailed by the Korean Central News Agency as the "Great Successor". According to the Korean Central News Agency (KCNA), during his death a fierce snowstorm "paused" and "the sky glowed red above the sacred Mount Paektu" and the ice on a famous lake also cracked so loud that it seemed to "shake the Heavens and the Earth".

Kim's funeral took place on 28 December in Pyongyang, with a mourning period lasting until the following day. South Korea's military was immediately put on alert after the announcement and its National Security Council convened for an emergency meeting, out of concern that political jockeying in North Korea could destabilise the region. Asian stock markets fell soon after the announcement, due to similar concerns.

On 12 January 2012, North Korea called Kim the "eternal leader" and announced that his body would be preserved and displayed at Pyongyang's Kumsusan Memorial Palace. Officials also announced plans to install statues, portraits, and immortality towers across the country. His birthday of 16 February was declared "the greatest auspicious holiday of the nation" and was named the Day of the Shining Star.

In February 2012, on what would have been his 71st birthday, Kim was posthumously made Dae Wonsu (usually translated as Generalissimo, literally grand marshal), the nation's top military rank. He had been named Wonsu (Marshal) in 1992 when North Korean founder Kim Il Sung was promoted to Dae Wonsu. Also in February 2012, the North Korean government created the Order of Kim Jong Il in his honor and awarded it to 132 individuals for services in building a "thriving socialist nation" and for increasing defence capabilities. Kim Jong Un was elected as the First Secretary of the Workers' Party of Korea on 11 April 2012 at the Fourth Conference of the WPK. The Party declared itself as "the party of Kim Il Sung and Kim Jong Il"; Kimilsungism became Kimilsungism–Kimjongilism, thereafter declared to be "the only guiding idea of the party" as well as the state ideology of North Korea. The Constitution was amended in 2012 to name Kim Jong Il as the Eternal General Secretary of the Workers' Party of Korea and Eternal Chairman of the National Defence Commission.

== Personal life ==
=== Family ===
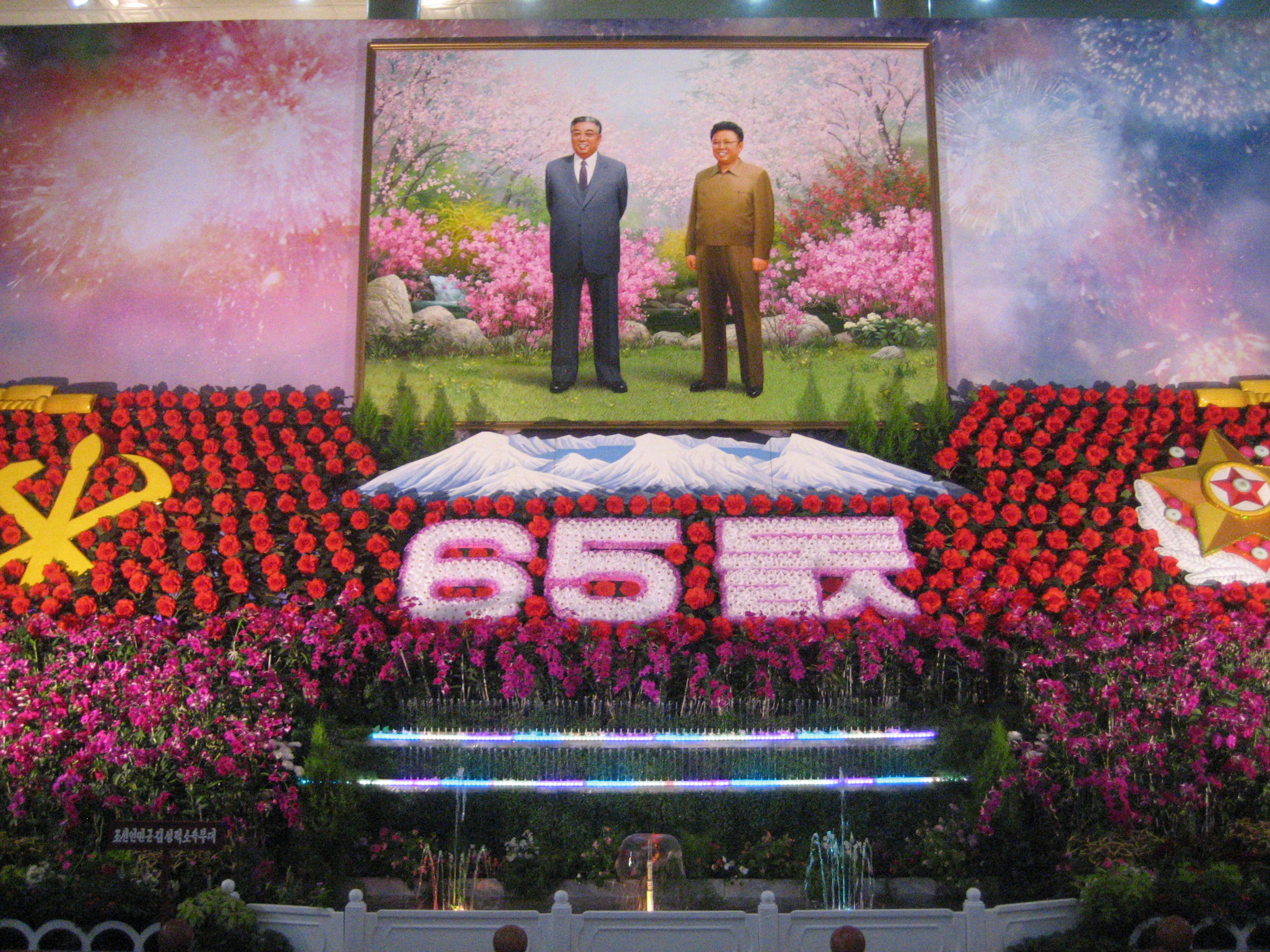
Kim Jong Il and his father Kim Il Sung

There is no official information available about Kim Jong Il's marital history, but he is believed to have been officially married twice and to have had three mistresses. He had three known sons: Kim Jong-nam, Kim Jong-chul and Kim Jong Un. His three known daughters are Kim Hye Kyung, Kim Sol-song and Kim Yo Jong.

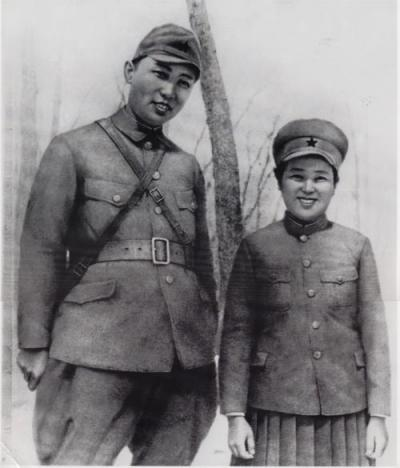
Kim Il-sung and Kim Jong-suk, the parents of Kim Jong Il, 1941

Kim's first wife, Hong Il-chon, was the daughter of a martyr who died during the Korean War. She was handpicked by his father and married him in 1966. They had a daughter called Kim Hye Kyung, born in 1968, and divorced in 1969.

Kim's first mistress, Song Hye-rim, was a star of North Korean films. She was already married to another man and with a child when they met. Kim is reported to have forced her husband to divorce her. This relationship, which started in 1970, was not officially recognized. They had one son, Kim Jong-nam (1971–2017), who was Kim Jong Il's eldest son. Kim kept both the relationship and the child a secret (even from his father) until he ascended to power in 1994. However, after years of estrangement, Song is believed to have died in Moscow in the Central Clinical Hospital in 2002.

Kim's official wife, Kim Young-sook, was the daughter of a high-ranking military official. His father Kim Il Sung handpicked her to marry his son. The two were estranged for some years before his death. Kim had a daughter from this marriage, Kim Sol-song (born 1974).

His second mistress, Ko Yong Hui, was a Japanese-born ethnic Korean and a dancer. She had taken over the role of First Lady until her death – reportedly of cancer – in 2004. They had two sons, Kim Jong-chul (in 1981) and Kim Jong Un, also "Jong Woon" or "Jong Woong" (in 1983). They also had a daughter, Kim Yo Jong, who was about 23 years old in 2012.

After Ko's death, Kim lived with Kim Ok, his third mistress, who had served as his personal secretary since the 1980s. She "virtually act[ed] as North Korea's first lady" and frequently accompanied Kim on his visits to military bases and in meetings with visiting foreign dignitaries. She traveled with Kim on a secretive trip to China in January 2006, where she was received by Chinese officials as Kim's wife.

According to Michael Breen, author of the book Kim Jong Il: North Korea's Dear Leader, the women intimately linked to Kim never acquired any power or influence of consequence. As he explains, their roles were limited to that of romance and domesticity.

He had a younger sister, Kim Kyong-hui. She was married to Jang Sung-taek, who was executed in December 2013 in Pyongyang, after being charged with treason and corruption.

=== Personality ===
Like his father, Kim had a fear of flying and always travelled by private armored train for state visits to Russia and China. The BBC reported that Konstantin Pulikovsky, a Russian emissary who travelled with Kim across Russia by train, told reporters that Kim had live lobsters air-lifted to the train every day and ate them with silver chopsticks.

Kim was said to be a huge film fan, owning a collection of more than 20,000 video tapes and DVDs. His reported favourite movie franchises included Friday the 13th, Godzilla, Hong Kong action cinema, Indiana Jones, James Bond, Otoko wa Tsurai yo, and Rambo, with Sean Connery and Elizabeth Taylor his favourite male and female actors. Kim was also said to have been a fan of Ealing comedies, inspired by their emphasis on team spirit and a mobilised proletariat. Kim oversaw the production of The Flower Girl, a film which also became immensely popular in China. He authored On the Art of the Cinema. In 1978, on Kim's orders South Korean film director Shin Sang-ok and his actress wife Choi Eun-hee were kidnapped in order to build a North Korean film industry. He supervised all of their films from thereupon until Shin and Choi escaped North Korean control in 1986. The last of these movies was the 1985 Godzilla-inspired epic Pulgasari, which Kim considered a masterpiece. In 2006, he was involved in the production of the Juche-based movie The Schoolgirl's Diary, which depicted the life of a young girl whose parents are scientists, with a KCNA news report stating that Kim "improved its script and guided its production".

Although Kim enjoyed many foreign forms of entertainment, according to former bodyguard Lee Young Kuk, he refused to consume any food or drink not produced in North Korea, with the exception of wine from France. His former chef Kenji Fujimoto, however, has stated that Kim sometimes sent him around the world to purchase a variety of foreign delicacies.

Kim reportedly enjoyed basketball. Former United States Secretary of State Madeleine Albright ended her summit with Kim by presenting him with a basketball signed by NBA legend Michael Jordan. His official biography also claims that Kim composed six operas and enjoyed staging elaborate musicals.

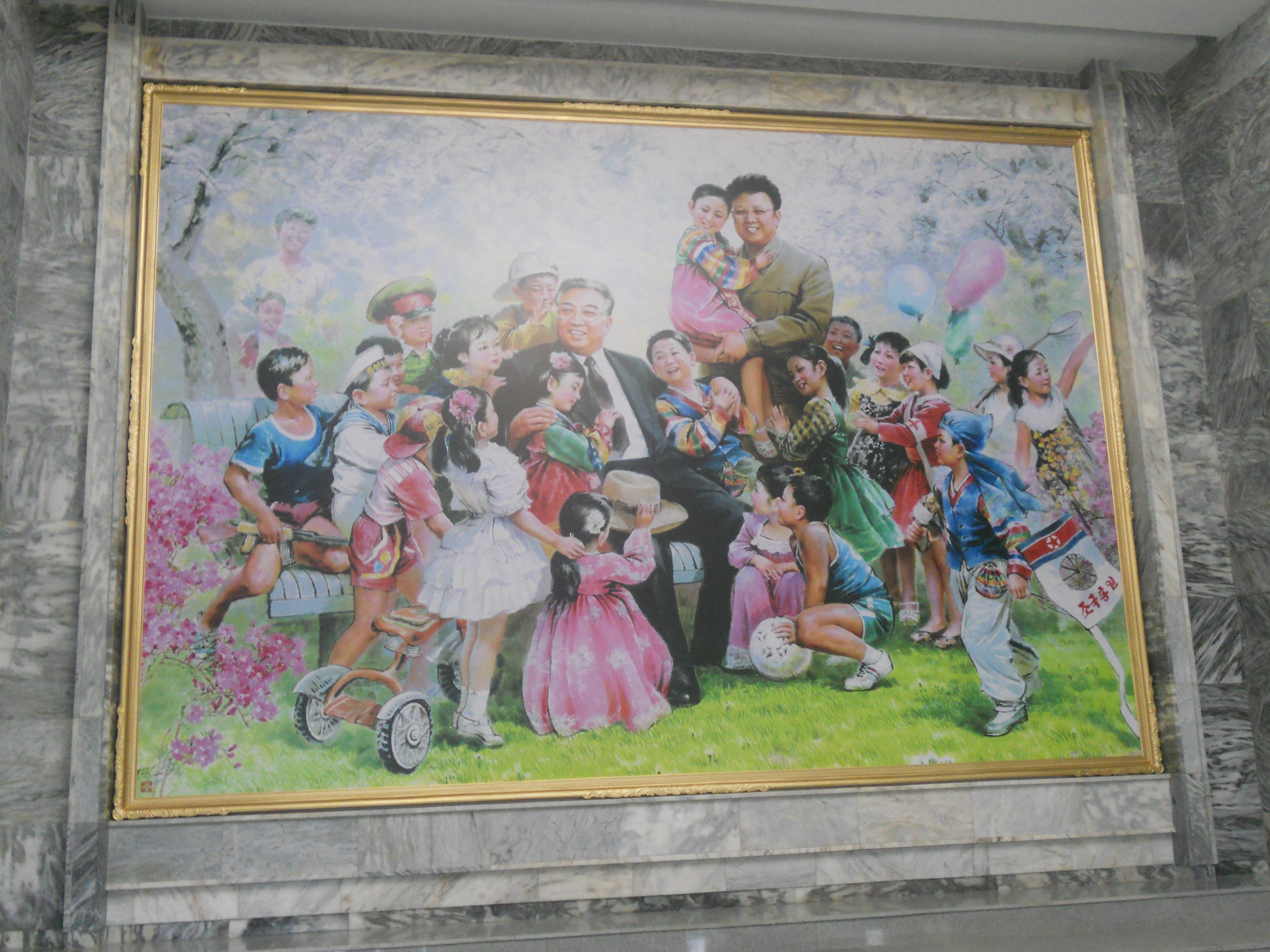
Kim Jong Il and his father Kim Il Sung

United States Special Envoy for the Korean Peace Talks, Charles Kartman, who was involved in the 2000 Madeleine Albright summit with Kim, characterised Kim as a reasonable man in negotiations, to the point, but with a sense of humor and personally attentive to the people he was hosting.

Defectors claimed that Kim had 17 different palaces and residences all over North Korea, including a private resort near Baekdu Mountain, a seaside lodge in the city of Wonsan, and Ryongsong Residence, a palace complex northeast of Pyongyang surrounded with multiple fence lines, bunkers and anti-aircraft batteries.

=== Finances ===
According to a 2010 report in the Sunday Telegraph, Kim had 4 billion USD on deposit in European banks in case he ever needed to flee North Korea. The Sunday Telegraph reported that most of the money was in banks in Luxembourg.

== Official titles ==
Kim was referred numerous titles during his rule by the state media. Titles were adopted and discontinued based on political circumstances, evolution of the state system, and the progress of the hereditary succession. During his lifetime, the standard introduction in state media was "General Secretary of the Workers Party of Korea, Chairman of the National Defence Commission, Supreme Commander of the Korean People's Army, Great Leader of Our Party and Our People Comrade Kim Jong Il".

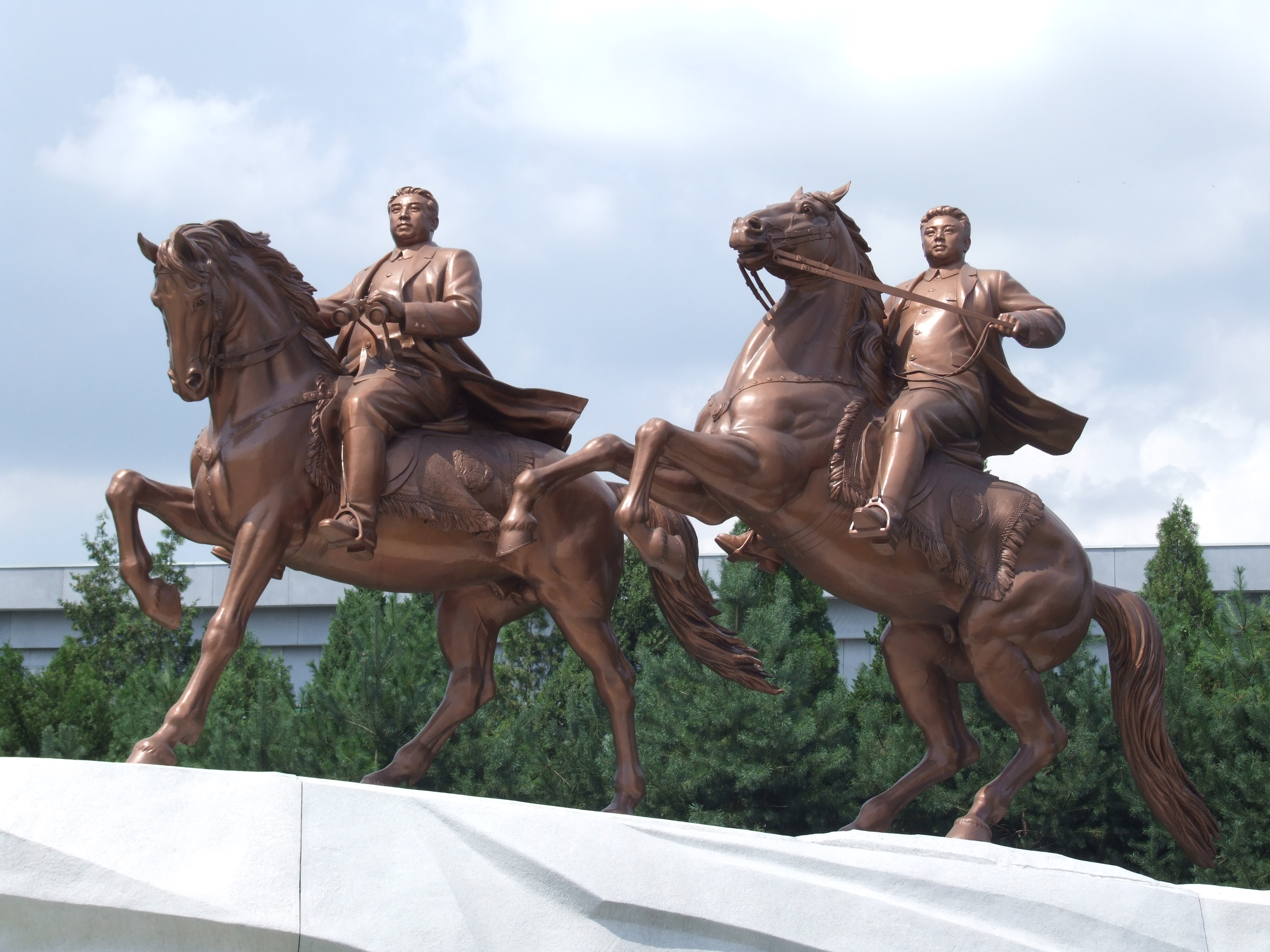
Equestrian statues of younger versions of Kim Jong Il (right) and Kim Il Sung, Pyongyang

- Party Center of the WPK and Member, Central Committee of the WPK (1970s)
- Dear Leader (Chinaehaneun Jidoja) (late 1970s–1994)
- Member, Presidium of the Supreme People's Assembly of the DPRK
- Secretary, Central Committee of the Workers' Party of Korea (1974–1997)
- Presidium member, WPK Central Committee (1980–2011)
- Supreme Commander, Korean People's Army (25 December 1991 – 17 December 2011)
- Marshal of the DPRK (1993–2011)
- Chairman, National Defence Commission (1993–2011)
- Great Leader (Widehan Ryongdoja) (8 July 1994 – 17 December 2011)
- General Secretary, Workers' Party of Korea (8 October 1997 – 17 December 2011)
- Chairman, Central Military Commission (DPRK) (8 October 1997 – 17 December 2011)
- Eternal Leader (posthumous) (12 January 2012 – present)
- Generalissimo of the DPRK (posthumous) (12 January 2012 – present)
- Eternal General Secretary, Workers' Party of Korea (posthumous) (11 April 2012 – present)
- Eternal Chairman of the National Defence Commission (posthumous) (13 April 2012 – present)
- Eternal leader of the Workers' Party of Korea (posthumous) (7 May 2016 – present)
- Eternal leader of Juche Korea (posthumous) (29 June 2016 – present)

== Published works ==
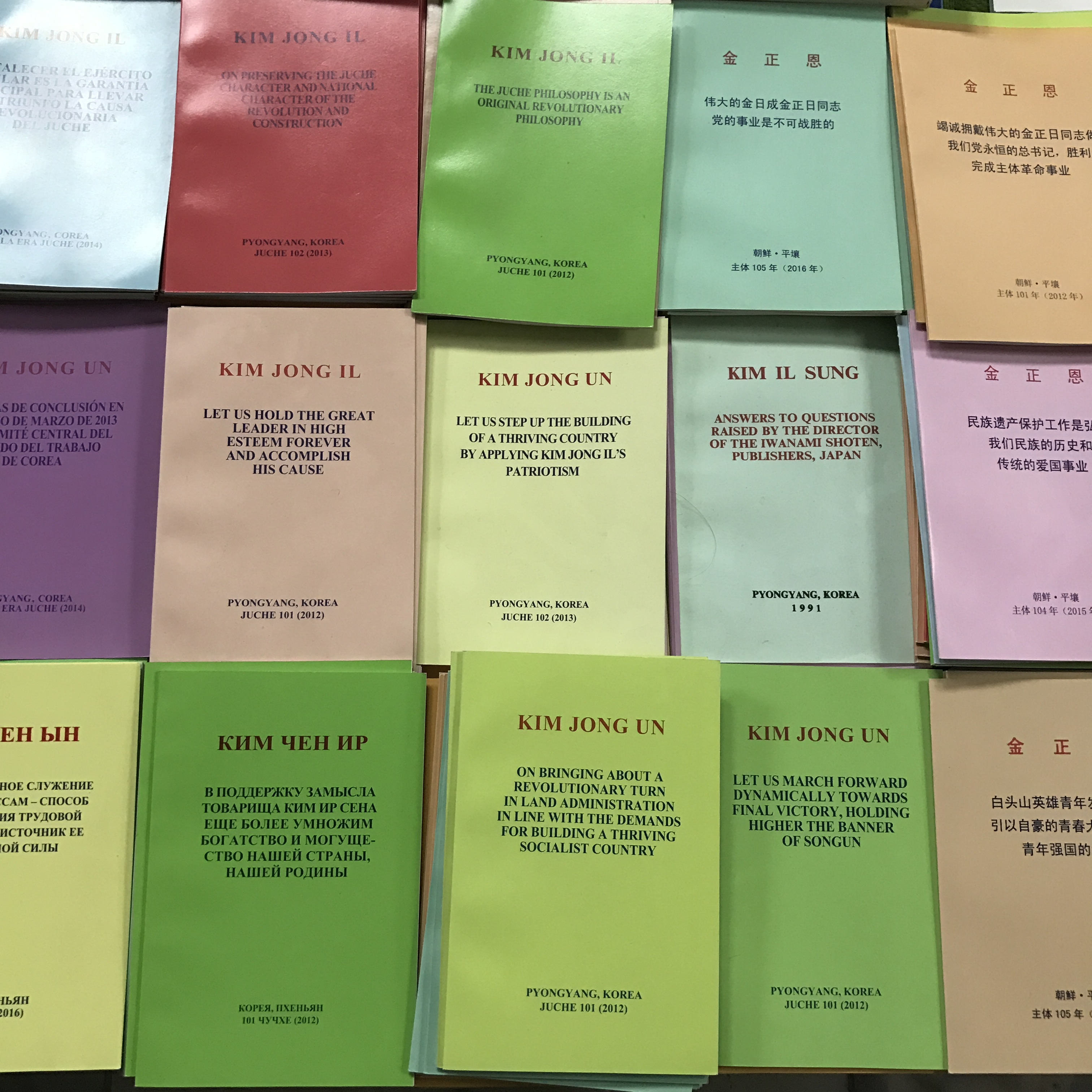
Books written by Kim Jong Il

According to North Korean sources, Kim published some 890 works during a period of his career from June 1964 to June 1994. According to KCNA, the number of works from 1964 to 2001 was 550. In 2000, it was reported that the Workers' Party of Korea Publishing House has published at least 120 works by Kim. In 2009, KCNA put the numbers as follows:

At least 354,000 copies of [Kim Jong Il's works] were translated into nearly 70 languages and came off the press in about 80 countries in the new century. There were more than 500 activities for studying and distributing the works in at least 120 countries and regions in 2006. The following year witnessed a total of more than 600 events of diverse forms in at least 130 countries and regions. And 2008 saw at least 3,000 functions held in over 150 countries and regions for the same purpose.

The Selected Works of Kim Jong Il (Enlarged Edition), whose publishing has continued posthumously, runs into volume 24 in Korean and to volume 15 in English. Volumes three to eight were never published in English.

The Complete Collection of Kim Jong Il's Works is currently in volume 13. There is a "Kim Jong Il's Works Exhibition House" dedicated to his works in North Korea, holding 1,100 of his works and manuscripts.

In his teens and university years, Kim had written poems. He also wrote song lyrics. His first major literary work was On the Art of the Cinema in 1973.

== See also ==
- List of awards and honours received by Kim Jong Il
- Politics of North Korea

== Notes ==
Party political offices
Preceded by Kim Yong-ju	Head of the Organization and Guidance Department; 1974–1992	Succeeded by Yun Sung-gwan
Preceded by Yun Sung-gwan	Director of the Organization and Guidance Department; 1994–2011	Succeeded by Eventually Choe Ryong-hae
Vacant Title last held by Kim Il Sung	General Secretary of the Workers' Party of Korea (Eternal General Secretary 2012–2021); 1997–2011	Succeeded by Kim Jong Un as First Secretary
Vacant Title last held by Kim Il Sung	Chairman of the WPK Central Military Commission; 1997–2011	Succeeded by Kim Jong Un
Political offices
Preceded by	First Vice Chairman of the National Defence Commission; 1990–1993	Succeeded by O Chin-u
Preceded by Kim Il Sung	Chairman of the National Defence Commission (Eternal Chairman 2012–2016); 1993–2011	Succeeded by Kim Jong Un as First Chairman
Military offices
Preceded by Kim Il Sung	Supreme Commander of the Korean People's Army; 1991–2011	Succeeded by Kim Jong Un
Honorary titles
New title	Eternal Leader of North Korea; Anointed: 2016; Served alongside: Kim Il Sung	Eternal
