= 12th Presidium of the Supreme People's Assembly =

12th Presidium
- Sign of the Supreme People's Assembly

9 April 2009 – 9 April 2014 (5 years, 0 days) Overview
- Type: Presidium of the Supreme People's Assembly
- Election: 1st Session of the 13th Supreme People's Assembly
- Replenishment: 6th and 7th sessions

Leadership
- President: Kim Yong-nam
- Vice President: Yang Hyong-sop; Kim Yong-dae
- Secretary-General: Ho Song-ok; Thae Hyong-chol; Pyon Yong-rip; Choe Yong-rim

Members
- Total: 16

The 12th Presidium of the Supreme People's Assembly (SPA) was elected by the 1st Session of the 12th Supreme People's Assembly on 9 April 2009. It was replaced on 9 April 2014 by the 13th SPA Presidium.

== Officers ==
=== President ===
| Name | Hangul | Took office | Left office | Duration |
|---|---|---|---|---|
| Kim Yong-nam | 김영남 | 9 April 2009 | 9 April 2014 | 5 years and 0 days |

=== Vice president ===
| Name | Hangul | Took office | Left office | Duration |
|---|---|---|---|---|
| Yang Hyong-sop | 양형섭 | 9 April 2009 | 9 April 2014 | 5 years and 0 days |
| Kim Yong-dae | 김영대 | 9 April 2009 | 9 April 2014 | 5 years and 0 days |

=== Honorary Vice President ===
| Name | Hangul | Took office | Left office | Duration |
|---|---|---|---|---|
| Kim Yong-ju | 김영주 | 9 April 2009 | 9 April 2014 | 5 years and 0 days |

=== Secretary-General ===
| Name | Hangul | Took office | Left office | Duration |
|---|---|---|---|---|
| Choe Yong-rim | 최영림 | 9 April 2009 | 9 April 2010 | 1 year and 0 days |
| Pyon Yong-rip | 변영립 | 9 April 2010 | 13 April 2012 | 2 years and 4 days |
| Thae Hyong-chol | 태형철 | 13 April 2012 | 1 April 2013 | 1 year and 361 days |
| Ho Song-ok | 홍선옥 | 1 April 2013 | 9 April 2014 | 1 year and 8 days |

== Members ==
| Rank | Name | Hangul | 11th PRE | 13th PRE | Positions |
|---|---|---|---|---|---|
| 1 | Kim Yong-nam | 김영남 | Old | Reelected | President of the Presidium of the Supreme People's Assembly |
| 2 | Yang Hyong-sop | 양형섭 | Old | Reelected | Vice President of the Presidium of the Supreme People's Assembly |
| 3 | Kim Yong-dae | 김영대 | Old | Reelected | Vice President of the Presidium of the Supreme People's Assembly |
| 4 | Kim Yong-ju | 김영주 | Old | Reelected | Honorary Vice President of the Presidium of the Supreme People's Assembly |
| 5 | Choe Yong-rim | 최영림 | Old | Reelected | Secretary-General of the Presidium of the Supreme People's Assembly |
| 6 | Ryu Mi-yong | 류미영 | Old | Reelected | — |
| 7 | Kang Yang-sop | 강양섭 | Old | Demoted | — |
| 8 | Sim Sang-jin | 심상진 | New | Demoted | — |
| 9 | Hong Sok-hyong | 홍석형 | Old | Demoted | — |
| 10 | Kim Yang-gon | 김양건 | New | Reelected | — |
| 11 | Ri Yong-chol | 리용철 | New | Demoted | — |
| 12 | Kim Pyong-phal | 김평팔 | New | Demoted | — |
| 13 | Kang Chang-uk | 강창욱 | Old | Demoted | — |
| 14 | Ro Song-sil | 로성실 | New | Demoted | — |
| 15 | Pyon Yong-rip | 변영립 | Old | Demoted | — |
| 16 | Thae Hyong-chol | 태형 | Old | Demoted | — |

== Add-ons ==
| Name | Hangul | Session | | 13th PRE | Positions |
| Name | Hangul | 6th (2012) | 7th (2013) | 13th PRE | Positions |
|---|---|---|---|---|---|
| Ho Song-ok | 홍선옥 | — | Elected | Reelected | Secretary-General of the Presidium of the Supreme People's Assembly |
| Hong In-bom | 홍인범 | Elected | — | Demoted | Secretary of the South Phyongan Provincial Committee |
| Jon Yong-nam | 전용남 | Elected | — | Reelected | Chairman of the Kim Il-sung Socialist Youth League's Central Committee |
