= 11th Presidium of the Supreme People's Assembly =

11th Presidium
- Sign of the Supreme People's Assembly

3 September 2003 – 9 April 2009 (5 years, 218 days) Overview
- Type: Presidium of the Supreme People's Assembly
- Election: 1st Session of the 11th Supreme People's Assembly

Leadership
- President: Kim Yong-nam
- Vice President: Yang Hyong-sop; Kim Yong-dae
- Secretary-General: Choe Yong-rim; Kim Yun Hyok

Members
- Total: 16

The 11th Presidium of the Supreme People's Assembly (SPA) was elected by the 1st Session of the 11th Supreme People's Assembly on 3 September 2003. It was replaced on 9 April 2009 by the 12th SPA Presidium.

== Officers ==
=== President ===
| Name | Hangul | Took office | Left office | Duration |
|---|---|---|---|---|
| Kim Yong-nam | 김영남 | 3 September 2003 | 9 April 2009 | 5 years and 218 days |

=== Vice president ===
| Name | Hangul | Took office | Left office | Duration |
|---|---|---|---|---|
| Yang Hyong-sop | 양형섭 | 3 September 2003 | 9 April 2009 | 5 years and 218 days |
| Kim Yong-dae | 김영대 | 3 September 2003 | 9 April 2009 | 5 years and 218 days |

=== Honorary Vice President ===
| Name | Hangul | Took office | Left office | Duration |
|---|---|---|---|---|
| Pak Song-chol | 박성철 | 3 September 2003 | 28 October 2008 | 5 years and 55 days |
| Kim Yong-ju | 김영주 | 3 September 2003 | 9 April 2009 | 5 years and 218 days |

=== Secretary-General ===
| Name | Hangul | Took office | Left office | Duration |
|---|---|---|---|---|
| Kim Yun-hyok | 김윤혁 | 3 September 2003 | 11 April 2005 | 1 year and 220 days |
| Choe Yong-rim | 최영림 | 11 April 2005 | 9 April 2009 | 3 years and 363 days |

== Members ==
| Rank | Name | Hangul | 10th PRE | 12th PRE | Positions |
|---|---|---|---|---|---|
| 1 | Kim Yong-nam | 김영남 | Old | Reelected | President of the Presidium of the Supreme People's Assembly |
| 2 | Yang Hyong-sop | 양형섭 | Old | Reelected | Vice President of the Presidium of the Supreme People's Assembly |
| 3 | Kim Yong-dae | 김영대 | Old | Reelected | Vice President of the Presidium of the Supreme People's Assembly |
| 4 | Pak Song-chol | 박성철 | Old | Dead | Honorary Vice President of the Presidium of the Supreme People's Assembly |
| 5 | Kim Yong-ju | 김영주 | Old | Reelected | Honorary Vice President of the Presidium of the Supreme People's Assembly |
| 6 | Kim Yun-hyok | 김윤혁 | Old | Demoted | Secretary-General of the Presidium of the Supreme People's Assembly |
| 7 | Ryu Mi-yong | 류미영 | Old | Reelected | — |
| 8 | Kang Yang-sop | 강양섭 | Old | Reelected | — |
| 9 | Pak Thae-hwa | 박태화 | Old | Demoted | — |
| 10 | Hong Sok-hyong | 홍석형 | New | Reelected | — |
| 11 | Ri Kwang-ho | 리광호 | Old | Demoted | — |
| 12 | Kim Kyong-ho | 김경호 | New | Demoted | — |
| 13 | Ryom Sun-gil | 료선길 | Old | Demoted | — |
| 14 | Sung Sang-sop | 성상섭 | New | Demoted | — |
| 15 | Pak Sun-hui | 박순희 | New | Demoted | — |
| 16 | Pyon Yong-rip | 변영립 | New | Reelected | — |
| 17 | Thae Hyong-chol | 태형철 | New | Reelected | — |

== Add-ons ==
| Name | Hangul | Election | | 12th PRE | Positions |
| Name | Hangul | Session | Date | 12th PRE | Positions |
|---|---|---|---|---|---|
| Choe Yong-rim | 최영림 | 3rd | 11 April 2005 | Reelected | Secretary-General of the Presidium of the Supreme People's Assembly |
| Kang Chang-uk | 강창욱 | 3rd | 11 April 2005 | Reelected | Chairman of the Union of Agricultural Workers of Korea's Central Committee |
