= Vice Chairman of the Supreme People's Assembly =

The vice chairman of the Supreme People's Assembly (Korean: 최고인민회의 부의장) is a member of the Supreme People's Assembly that ranks next to the chairman. The SPA vice chairman is elected by the Supreme People's Assembly along with the SPA chairman. From 1972 until 1998, the SPA vice chairman was concurrently the SPA Standing Committee vice chairman.

The current vice chairpersons of the Supreme People's Assembly are Pak Kum-hui, who was elected on 11 April 2019, and Maeng Kyong Il, who was elected on 17 January 2023.

== List of office holders ==
No.	Portrait	Name (Birth–Death)	Term of office		Party	Chairman	SPA
No.	Portrait	Name (Birth–Death)	Took office	Left office	Party	Chairman	SPA
1		Kim Tal-hyon 김달현 (1884–1958)	10 September 1948	22 December 1953	Chondoist Chongu Party	Ho Hon (until 1951) Vacant (1951–1953) Ri Yong (from 1953)	1st
2		Ri Yong 리영 (1889–1960)	10 September 1948	22 December 1953	Workers' Party of North Korea (until 1949)	Ho Hon (until 1951) Vacant (1951–1953) Ri Yong (from 1953)	1st
2		Ri Yong 리영 (1889–1960)	10 September 1948	22 December 1953	Workers' Party of Korea (from 1949)	Ho Hon (until 1951) Vacant (1951–1953) Ri Yong (from 1953)	1st
3		Ri Yu-min 리유민	22 December 1953	20 September 1957	Workers' Party of Korea	Ho Hon (until 1951) Vacant (1951–1953) Ri Yong (from 1953)	1st
4		Hong Ki-hwang 홍기황	22 December 1953	20 September 1957	Korean Democratic Party	Ho Hon (until 1951) Vacant (1951–1953) Ri Yong (from 1953)	1st
5		Ri Ki-yong 리기영 (1895–1984)	20 September 1957	22 October 1962	Workers' Party of Korea	Choe Won-taek	2nd
6		Kim Chang-jun 김창준	20 September 1957	28 October 1959	Workers' Party of Korea	Choe Won-taek	2nd
7		Kim Tuk-ran 김득란	28 October 1959	22 October 1962	Workers' Party of Korea	Choe Won-taek	2nd
(5)		Ri Ki-yong 리기영 (1895–1984)	22 October 1962	16 December 1967	Workers' Party of Korea	Choe Won-taek	3rd
(7)		Kim Tuk-ran 김득란	22 October 1962	16 December 1967	Workers' Party of Korea	Choe Won-taek	3rd
(5)		Ri Ki-yong 리기영 (1895–1984)	16 December 1967	28 December 1972	Workers' Party of Korea	Paek Nam-un	4th
(7)		Kim Tuk-ran 김득란	16 December 1967	28 December 1972	Workers' Party of Korea	Paek Nam-un	4th
8		Hong Ki-mun 홍기문 (1903–1992)	28 December 1972	17 December 1977	Workers' Party of Korea	Hwang Jang-yop	5th
9		Ho Jong-suk 허정숙 (1908–1991)	25 December 1972	17 December 1977	Workers' Party of Korea	Hwang Jang-yop	5th
(9)		Ho Jong-suk 허정숙 (1908–1991)	17 December 1977	5 April 1982	Workers' Party of Korea	Hwang Jang-yop	6th
(8)		Hong Ki-mun 홍기문 (1903–1992)	17 December 1977	5 April 1982	Workers' Party of Korea	Hwang Jang-yop	6th
(9)		Ho Jong-suk 허정숙 (1908–1991)	5 April 1982	7 April 1983	Workers' Party of Korea	Hwang Jang-yop (until 1983) Yang Hyong-sop (from 1983)	7th
(8)		Hong Ki-mun 홍기문 (1903–1992)	5 April 1982	7 April 1983	Workers' Party of Korea	Hwang Jang-yop (until 1983) Yang Hyong-sop (from 1983)	7th
10		Son Song-pil 손성필 (born 1927)	7 April 1983	30 December 1986	Workers' Party of Korea	Hwang Jang-yop (until 1983) Yang Hyong-sop (from 1983)	7th
11		Ryo Yon-gu 려연구 (1927–1996)	7 April 1983	30 December 1986	Workers' Party of Korea	Hwang Jang-yop (until 1983) Yang Hyong-sop (from 1983)	7th
(10)		Son Song-pil 손성필 (born 1927)	30 December 1986	26 May 1990	Workers' Party of Korea	Yang Hyong-sop	8th
(11)		Ryo Yon-gu 려연구 (1927–1996)	30 December 1986	26 May 1990	Workers' Party of Korea	Yang Hyong-sop	8th
12		Paek In-jun 백인준 (1920–1999)	26 May 1990	5 September 1998	Workers' Party of Korea	Yang Hyong-sop	9th
(11)		Ryo Yon-gu 려연구 (1927–1996)	26 May 1990	28 September 1996	Workers' Party of Korea	Yang Hyong-sop	9th
13		Jang Chol 장철 (1926–2004)	5 September 1998	3 September 2003	Workers' Party of Korea	Choe Thae-bok	10th
14		Ryo Won-gu 려원구 (1928–2009)	5 September 1998	3 September 2003	Workers' Party of Korea	Choe Thae-bok	10th
15		Kang Nung-su 강능수 (1930–2015)	3 September 2003	9 April 2008	Workers' Party of Korea	Choe Thae-bok	11th
(14)		Ryo Won-gu 려원구 (1928–2009)	3 September 2003	9 April 2009	Workers' Party of Korea	Choe Thae-bok	11th
16		Kim Wan-su 김완수 (born 1939)	9 April 2009	9 April 2014	Workers' Party of Korea	Choe Thae-bok	12th
17		Hong Son-ok 홍선옥 (born 1950)	9 April 2009	9 April 2014	Workers' Party of Korea	Choe Thae-bok	12th
18		An Tong-chun 안동춘	9 April 2014	11 April 2019	Workers' Party of Korea	Choe Thae-bok	13th
19		Ri Hye-jong 리혜정	9 April 2014	11 April 2019	Workers' Party of Korea	Choe Thae-bok	13th
20		Pak Chol-min 박철민	11 April 2019	17 January 2023	Workers' Party of Korea	Pak Thae-song (until 2023) Pak In-chol (2023–2025) Vacant (from 2025)	14th
21		Pak Kum-hui 박금희	11 April 2019	22 March 2026	Workers' Party of Korea	Pak Thae-song (until 2023) Pak In-chol (2023–2025) Vacant (from 2025)	14th
22		Maeng Kyong-il 맹경일 (born 1963)	17 January 2023	22 March 2026	Workers' Party of Korea	Pak Thae-song (until 2023) Pak In-chol (2023–2025) Vacant (from 2025)	14th
23		Kim Hyong-sik 김형식	22 March 2026	Incumbent	Workers' Party of Korea	Jo Yong-won (until 2026) Vacant (since 2026)	15th
24		Ri Son-gwon 리선권	22 March 2026	5 November 2026	Korean Social Democratic Party	Jo Yong-won (until 2026) Vacant (since 2026)	15th

== See also ==
- Vice Chairman of the Standing Committee of the Supreme People's Assembly
