= Vice Chairman of the Standing Committee of the Supreme People's Assembly =

North Korean government position

The vice chairman of the Standing Committee of the Supreme People's Assembly (Korean: 최고인민회의 상임위원회 부위원장; RR: Choegoinminhoeui Sang-im-wiwonhoe Buwiwonjang) is one of the members that form the Standing Committee of the Supreme People's Assembly. The vice chairman of the SPA Standing Committee is elected by the Supreme People's Assembly alongside the SPA Standing Committee's chairman, secretary general and members. From 1972 until 1998, the vice chairman of the SPA Standing Committee was concurrently the vice chairman of the Supreme People's Assembly.

The current vice chairmen of the SPA Standing Committee are Kim Hyong-sik and Ri Son-gwon, who were elected on 22 March 2026.

== List of office holders ==
| No. | Portrait | Name (Birth–Death) | Term of office | | Party | Chairman | SPA |
| No. | Portrait | Name (Birth–Death) | Took office | Left office | Party | Chairman | SPA |
|---|---|---|---|---|---|---|---|
| 1 | | Hong Ki-ju 홍기주 | 10 September 1948 | 22 December 1953 | Korean Democratic Party | Kim Tu-bong | 1st |
| 2 | | Hong Nam-pyo 홍남표 (1888–1950) | 10 September 1948 | 3 June 1950 | Workers' Party of South Korea (until 1949) | Kim Tu-bong | 1st |
| 2 | | Hong Nam-pyo 홍남표 (1888–1950) | 10 September 1948 | 3 June 1950 | Workers' Party of Korea (from 1949) | Kim Tu-bong | 1st |
| 3 | | Kim Ung-gi 김웅기 | 22 December 1953 | 20 September 1957 | Workers' Party of Korea | Kim Tu-bong | 1st |
| 4 | | Yi Kuk-no 리극로 (1893–1978) | 22 December 1953 | 20 September 1957 | Workers' Party of Korea | Kim Tu-bong | 1st |
| (4) | | Yi Kuk-no 리극로 (1893–1978) | 20 September 1957 | 25 March 1961 | Workers' Party of Korea | Choe Yong-gon | 2nd |
| 5 | | Hyon Chil-chong 현칠종 | 20 September 1957 | 2 October 1958 | Workers' Party of Korea | Choe Yong-gon | 2nd |
| 6 | | Kim Won-bong 김원봉 (1898–1958) | 20 September 1957 | 2 October 1958 | Workers' Party of Korea | Choe Yong-gon | 2nd |
| 7 | | Han Sorya 한설야 (1900–1976) | 2 October 1958 | 23 October 1962 | Workers' Party of Korea | Choe Yong-gon | 2nd |
| 8 | | Ko Chun-thaek 고춘택 | 2 October 1958 | 23 October 1962 | Workers' Party of Korea | Choe Yong-gon | 2nd |
| 9 | | Kang Ryang-uk 강량욱 (1903–1983) | 28 October 1959 | 23 October 1962 | Korean Democratic Party | Choe Yong-gon | 2nd |
| 10 | | Paek Nam-un 백남운 (1894–1976) | 25 March 1961 | 23 October 1962 | Workers' Party of Korea | Choe Yong-gon | 2nd |
| 11 | | Pak Chong-ae 박정애 (1907–unknown) | 23 October 1962 | 16 December 1967 | Workers' Party of Korea | Choe Yong-gon | 3rd |
| 12 | | Hong Myong-hui 홍명희 (1888–1968) | 23 October 1962 | 16 December 1967 | Democratic Independent Party | Choe Yong-gon | 3rd |
| (9) | | Kang Ryang-uk 강량욱 (1903–1983) | 23 October 1962 | 16 December 1967 | Korean Democratic Party | Choe Yong-gon | 3rd |
| (10) | | Paek Nam-un 백남운 (1894–1976) | 23 October 1962 | 16 December 1967 | Workers' Party of Korea | Choe Yong-gon | 3rd |
| 13 | | Pak Kum-chol 박금철 (1911–1967) | 23 October 1962 | 29 April 1966 | Workers' Party of Korea | Choe Yong-gon | 3rd |
| 14 | | Ri Yong-ho 리용호 | 29 April 1966 | 16 December 1967 | Workers' Party of Korea | Choe Yong-gon | 3rd |
| (12) | | Hong Myong-hui 홍명희 (1888–1968) | 16 December 1967 | 28 December 1972 | Democratic Independent Party | Choe Yong-gon | 4th |
| (11) | | Pak Chong-ae 박정애 (1907–unknown) | 16 December 1967 | 28 December 1972 | Workers' Party of Korea | Choe Yong-gon | 4th |
| (9) | | Kang Ryang-uk 강량욱 (1903–1983) | 16 December 1967 | 28 December 1972 | Korean Democratic Party | Choe Yong-gon | 4th |
| (14) | | Ri Yong-ho 리용호 | 16 December 1967 | 28 December 1972 | Workers' Party of Korea | Choe Yong-gon | 4th |
| 15 | | Hong Ki-mun 홍기문 (1903–1992) | 28 December 1972 | 17 December 1977 | Workers' Party of Korea | Hwang Jang-yop | 5th |
| 16 | | Ho Jong-suk 허정숙 (1908–1991) | 28 December 1972 | 17 December 1977 | Workers' Party of Korea | Hwang Jang-yop | 5th |
| (16) | | Ho Jong-suk 허정숙 (1908–1991) | 17 December 1977 | 5 April 1982 | Workers' Party of Korea | Hwang Jang-yop | 6th |
| (15) | | Hong Ki-mun 홍기문 (1903–1992) | 17 December 1977 | 5 April 1982 | Workers' Party of Korea | Hwang Jang-yop | 6th |
| (16) | | Ho Jong-suk 허정숙 (1908–1991) | 5 April 1982 | 7 April 1983 | Workers' Party of Korea | Hwang Jang-yop (until 1983) Yang Hyong-sop (from 1983) | 7th |
| (15) | | Hong Ki-mun 홍기문 (1903–1992) | 5 April 1982 | 7 April 1983 | Workers' Party of Korea | Hwang Jang-yop (until 1983) Yang Hyong-sop (from 1983) | 7th |
| 17 | | Son Song-pil 손성필 (1927–unknown) | 7 April 1983 | 30 December 1986 | Workers' Party of Korea | Hwang Jang-yop (until 1983) Yang Hyong-sop (from 1983) | 7th |
| 18 | | Ryo Yon-gu 려연구 (1927–1996) | 7 April 1983 | 30 December 1986 | Workers' Party of Korea | Hwang Jang-yop (until 1983) Yang Hyong-sop (from 1983) | 7th |
| (17) | | Son Song-pil 손성필 (1927–unknown) | 30 December 1986 | 26 May 1990 | Workers' Party of Korea | Yang Hyong-sop | 8th |
| (18) | | Ryo Yon-gu 려연구 (1927–1996) | 30 December 1986 | 26 May 1990 | Workers' Party of Korea | Yang Hyong-sop | 8th |
| 19 | | Paek In-jun 백인준 (1920–1999) | 26 May 1990 | 5 September 1998 | Workers' Party of Korea | Yang Hyong-sop | 9th |
| (18) | | Ryo Yon-gu 려연구 (1927–1996) | 26 May 1990 | 28 September 1996 | Workers' Party of Korea | Yang Hyong-sop | 9th |
| 20 | | Yang Hyong-sop 양형섭 (1925–2022) | 5 September 1998 | 3 September 2003 | Workers' Party of Korea | Kim Yong-nam | 10th |
| 21 | | Kim Yong-dae 김영대 (born 1937) | 5 September 1998 | 3 September 2003 | Korean Social Democratic Party | Kim Yong-nam | 10th |
| (20) | | Yang Hyong-sop 양형섭 (1925–2022) | 3 September 2003 | 9 April 2009 | Workers' Party of Korea | Kim Yong-nam | 11th |
| (21) | | Kim Yong-dae 김영대 (born 1937) | 3 September 2003 | 9 April 2009 | Korean Social Democratic Party | Kim Yong-nam | 11th |
| (20) | | Yang Hyong-sop 양형섭 (1925–2022) | 9 April 2009 | 9 April 2014 | Workers' Party of Korea | Kim Yong-nam | 12th |
| (21) | | Kim Yong-dae 김영대 (born 1937) | 9 April 2009 | 9 April 2014 | Korean Social Democratic Party | Kim Yong-nam | 12th |
| (20) | | Yang Hyong-sop 양형섭 (1925–2022) | 9 April 2014 | 11 April 2019 | Workers' Party of Korea | Kim Yong-nam | 13th |
| (21) | | Kim Yong-dae 김영대 (born 1937) | 9 April 2014 | 11 April 2019 | Korean Social Democratic Party | Kim Yong-nam | 13th |
| 22 | | Thae Hyong-chol 태형철 (born 1953) | 11 April 2019 | 29 September 2021 | Workers' Party of Korea | Choe Ryong-hae | 14th |
| (21) | | Kim Yong-dae 김영대 (born 1937) | 11 April 2019 | 29 August 2019 | Korean Social Democratic Party | Choe Ryong-hae | 14th |
| 23 | | Pak Yong-il 박용일 (1966–2022) | 29 August 2019 | 19 September 2022 | Korean Social Democratic Party | Choe Ryong-hae | 14th |
| 24 | | Kang Yun-sok 강윤석 | 29 September 2021 | 22 March 2026 | Workers' Party of Korea | Choe Ryong-hae | 14th |
| 25 | | Kim Ho-chol 김호철 | 18 January 2023 | 22 March 2026 | Korean Social Democratic Party | Choe Ryong-hae | 14th |
| 26 | | Kim Hyong-sik 김형식 | 22 March 2026 | Incumbent | Workers' Party of Korea | Jo Yong-won (until 2026) Vacant (since 2026) | 15th |
| 27 | | Ri Son-gwon 리선권 | 22 March 2026 | 5 November 2026 | Korean Social Democratic Party | Jo Yong-won (until 2026) Vacant (since 2026) | 15th |

== Honorary Vice President of the Presidium of the Supreme People's Assembly ==
The 1998 revision of the 1972 Constitution created the position of Honorary Vice President of the Presidium of the Supreme People's Assembly for deputies to the Supreme People's Assembly who had served for a long time and made special contributions. Honorary SPA Presidium vice presidents are elected by the Supreme People's Assembly. This position was abolished in 2019.

| No. | Portrait | Name (Birth–Death) | Term of office | | Party | President | SPA |
| No. | Portrait | Name (Birth–Death) | Took office | Left office | Party | President | SPA |
|---|---|---|---|---|---|---|---|
| 1 | | Ri Jong-ok 리종옥 (1916–1999) | 5 September 1998 | 23 September 1999 | Workers' Party of Korea | Kim Yong-nam | 10th |
| 2 | | Pak Song-chol 박성철 (1913–2008) | 5 September 1998 | 3 September 2003 | Workers' Party of Korea | Kim Yong-nam | 10th |
| 3 | | Kim Yong-ju 김영주 (1920–2021) | 5 September 1998 | 3 September 2003 | Workers' Party of Korea | Kim Yong-nam | 10th |
| 4 | | Jon Mun-sop 전문섭 (1919–1998) | 5 September 1998 | 29 December 1998 | Workers' Party of Korea | Kim Yong-nam | 10th |
| (2) | | Pak Song-chol 박성철 (1913–2008) | 3 September 2003 | 28 October 2008 | Workers' Party of Korea | Kim Yong-nam | 11th |
| (3) | | Kim Yong-ju 김영주 (1920–2021) | 3 September 2003 | 9 April 2009 | Workers' Party of Korea | Kim Yong-nam | 11th |
| (3) | | Kim Yong-ju 김영주 (1920–2021) | 9 April 2009 | 9 April 2014 | Workers' Party of Korea | Kim Yong-nam | 12th |
| (3) | | Kim Yong-ju 김영주 (1920–2021) | 9 April 2014 | 11 April 2019 | Workers' Party of Korea | Kim Yong-nam | 13th |
| 5 | | Choe Yong-rim 최영림 (born 1930) | 9 April 2014 | 11 April 2019 | Workers' Party of Korea | Kim Yong-nam | 13th |

== See also ==
- Vice Chairman of the Supreme People's Assembly
