= 13th Presidium of the Supreme People's Assembly =

13th Presidium
- Sign of the Supreme People's Assembly

9 April 2014 – 11 April 2019 (5 years, 2 days) Overview
- Type: Presidium of the Supreme People's Assembly
- Election: 1st Session of the 13th Supreme People's Assembly

Leadership
- President: Kim Yong-nam
- Secretary-General: Hong Son-ok

Members
- Total: 17

The 13th Presidium of the Supreme People's Assembly (SPA) was elected by the 1st Session of the 13th Supreme People's Assembly on 9 April 2014. It was replaced on 11 April 2019 by the 14th SPA Presidium.

== Members ==
Rank	Name	Hangul	12th PRE	14th PRE	Positions
1	Kim Yong-nam	김영남	Old	Demoted	President of the Presidium of the Supreme People's Assembly
2	Yang Hyong-sop	양형섭	Old	Demoted	Vice President of the Presidium of the Supreme People's Assembly
3	Kim Yong-dae	김영대	Old	Reelected	Vice President of the Presidium of the Supreme People's Assembly
4	Kim Yong-ju	김영주	Old	Demoted	Honorary Vice President of the Presidium of the Supreme People's Assembly
5	Choe Yong-rim	최영림	Old	Demoted	Honorary Vice President of the Presidium of the Supreme People's Assembly
6	Hong Son-ok	홍선옥	Old	Replaced	Secretary-General of the Presidium of the Supreme People's Assembly
7	Kim Yang-gon	김양건	Old	Dead	—
8	Thae Jong-su	태종수	New	Replaced	—
9	Jon Yong-nam	전용남	Old	Demoted	—
10	Hyon Sang-ju	현상주	New	Demoted	—
11	Ri Myong-gil	리명길	New	Replaced	—
12	Ri Myong-chol	리명철	New	Reelected	—
13	Kim Jong-sun	김종선	New	Demoted	—
14	Kim Wan-su	김완수	New	Replaced	—
15	Ryu Mi-yong	류미영	Old	Demoted	—
16	Kang Su-rin	강수린	New	Reelected	—
17	Jon Kyong-nam	전경남	New	Demoted	—

== Add-ons ==
Name	Hangul	Session		14th PRE	Positions
Name	Hangul	4th (2016)	6th (2018)	14th PRE	Positions
Ju Yong-gil	주용길	Elected	—	Reelected	President of the General Federation of Trade Unions of Korea's Central Committee
Kim Chang-yop	김창엽	—	Elected	Reelected	First Secretary of the Kimilsungist-Kimjongilist Youth League's Central Committee
Pak Chol-nin	박철닌	—	Elected	Demoted	President of the Union of Agricultural Workers of Korea's Central Committee
Pak Thae-song	박태성	Elected	Replaced	Demoted	Chairman of the South Pyongyang Provincial Committee

== Replacements ==
Rank	Officeholder		Replacement		Session		14th PRE
Rank	Name	Hangul	Name	Hangul	Date	Session	14th PRE
8	Thae Jong-su	태종수	Kim Yong-chol	김영철	29 June 2016	4th	Reelected
11	Ri Myong-gil	리명길	Jang Chun-sil	장춘실	11 April 2017	5th	Reelected
14	Kim Wan-su	김완수	Pak Myong-chol	박명철	11 April 2017	5th	Reelected
6	Hong Son-ok	홍선옥	Jong Yong-guk	종용국	11 April 2018	6th	Reelected
7	Pak Thae-song	박태성	Kim Su-gil	김수길	11 April 2018	6th	Demoted
