= 10th Presidium of the Supreme People's Assembly =

1998 gathering of North Korean ruling party body

10th Presidium
- Sign of the Supreme People's Assembly

5 September 1998 – 3 September 2003 (4 years, 363 days) Overview
- Type: Presidium of the Supreme People's Assembly
- Election: 1st Session of the 10th Supreme People's Assembly

Leadership
- President: Kim Yong-nam
- Vice President: Yang Hyong-sop; Kim Yong-dae
- Secretary-General: Choe Yong-rim; Kim Yun Hyok

Members
- Total: 16

The 10th Presidium of the Supreme People's Assembly (SPA) was elected by the 1st Session of the 10th Supreme People's Assembly of North Korea on 5 September 1998. It was replaced on 3 September 2003 by the 11th SPA Presidium.

== Officers ==
=== President ===
Name	Hangul	Took office	Left office	Duration
Kim Yong-nam	김영남	5 September 1998	3 September 2003	4 years and 363 days

=== Vice president ===
Name	Hangul	Took office	Left office	Duration
Yang Hyong-sop	양형섭	5 September 1998	3 September 2003	4 years and 363 days
Kim Yong-dae	김영대	5 September 1998	3 September 2003	4 years and 363 days

=== Honorary Vice President ===
Name	Hangul	Took office	Left office	Duration
Ri Jong-ok	리종옥	5 September 1998	23 September 1999	1 year and 18 days
Pak Song-chol	박성철	5 September 1998	3 September 2003	4 years and 363 days
Kim Yong-ju	김영주	5 September 1998	3 September 2003	4 years and 363 days
Jon Mun-sop	김영주	5 September 1998	29 December 1998	115 days

=== Secretary-General ===
Name	Hangul	Took office	Left office	Duration
Kim Yun-hyok	김윤혁	5 September 1998	3 September 2003	4 years and 363 days

== Members ==
Rank	Name	Hangul	9th STC	11th PRE	Positions
1	Kim Yong-nam	김영남	Old	Reelected	President of the Presidium of the Supreme People's Assembly
2	Yang Hyong-sop	양형섭	Old	Reelected	Vice President of the Presidium of the Supreme People's Assembly
3	Kim Yong-dae	김영대	Old	Reelected	Vice President of the Presidium of the Supreme People's Assembly
4	Ri Jong-ok	리종옥	Old	Dead	Honorary Vice President of the Presidium of the Supreme People's Assembly
5	Pak Song-chol	박성철	Old	Reelected	Honorary Vice President of the Presidium of the Supreme People's Assembly
6	Kim Yong-ju	김영주	Old	Reelected	Honorary Vice President of the Presidium of the Supreme People's Assembly
7	Jon Mun-sop	김영주	Old	Dead	Honorary Vice President of the Presidium of the Supreme People's Assembly
8	Kim Yun-hyok	김윤혁	New	Reelected	Secretary-General of the Presidium of the Supreme People's Assembly
9	Ryu Mi-yong	류미영	New	Reelected	—
10	Kang Yong-sop	강영섭	Old	Demoted	—
11	Ri Gil-song	리길송	Old	Demoted	—
12	Ri Kwang-ho	리광호	Old	Reelected	—
13	Ri Chol-bong	리철봉	New	Demoted	—
14	Ri Il-hwan	리일환	New	Demoted	—
15	Sung Sang-sop	성상섭	Old	Reelected	—
16	Chon Yon-ok	전연옥	Old	Demoted	—
17	Ryom Sun-gil	료선길	New	Reelected	—
18	Pak Thae-hwa	박태화	New	Reelected	—
