= 14th Standing Committee of the Supreme People's Assembly =

14th Standing Committee
- Sign of the Supreme People's Assembly

12 April 2019 – 22 March 2026 Overview
- Type: Presidium of the Supreme People's Assembly
- Election: 1st Session of the 14th Supreme People's Assembly

Leadership
- Chairman: Choe Ryong-hae
- Vice Chairmen: Thae Hyong-chol; Kim Yong-dae
- Secretary-General: Jong Yong-guk

Members
- Total: 15

The 14th Standing Committee of the Supreme People's Assembly (SPA) was elected by the 1st Session of the 14th Supreme People's Assembly on 11 April 2019. It was named 14th Presidium until sometime in 2021 when the body's name was changed to the current one.

== Meetings ==
- 1st–10th not made public.
- 11th Plenary Meeting (4 November 2020)
- 12th Plenary Meeting (4 December 2020)
- 13th Plenary Meeting (4 March 2021)

== Members ==
Rank	Name	Hangul	13th PRE	Positions
1	Choe Ryong-hae	최룡해	New	Chairman of the Standing Committee of the Supreme People's Assembly
2	Thae Hyong-chol	태형철	New	Vice Chairman of the Standing Committee of the Supreme People's Assembly
3	Kim Yong-dae	김영대	Old	Vice Chairman of the Standing Committee of the Supreme People's Assembly
4	Jong Yong-guk	종용국	Old	Secretary-General of the Standing Committee of the Supreme People's Assembly
5	Kim Yong-chol	김영철	Old	—
6	Kim Nung-o	김능오	New	—
7	Kang Ji-yong	강지용	New	—
8	Ju Yong-gil	주용길	Old	—
9	Kim Chang-yop	김창엽	Old	—
10	Jang Chun-sil	장춘실	Old	—
11	Pak Myong-chol	박명철	Old	—
12	Ri Myong-chol	리명철	New	—
13	Kang Su-rin	강수v린	Old	—
14	Kang Myong-chol	강명철	Old	—
15	Ri Chol	리철	New	—
