= 2009 North Korean parliamentary election =

- 8 March 2009
- All 687 seats in the Supreme People's Assembly
- Turnout: 99.98%
Party	Seats
Workers' Party of Korea	606
Social Democratic Party	50
Chondoist Chongu Party	22
Chongryon	6
Independents	3
This lists parties that won seats. See the complete results below.
NDC Chairman before	Elected NDC Chairman
Kim Jong Il; Workers' Party	Kim Jong Il; Workers' Party

Parliamentary elections were held in North Korea on 8 March 2009 to elect the members of the 12th Supreme People's Assembly. They were originally scheduled to be held in August 2008 but were postponed. Analysts believe they were postponed due to Kim Jong-Il falling ill.

There was one candidate in each of the 687 voting districts, all of whom were pre-approved by North Korean leadership.

Kim Jong-Il ran for election in constituency No. 333. That particular constituency was chosen because the number 3 is a lucky number among Koreans.

== Background ==
The 11th Supreme People's Assembly was dissolved and elections were called for North Korea's 687 electoral districts on 7 January 2009. The elections were to be originally held as per North Korea's constitution in August 2008.

The delay was not officially explained, but was believed to be related to the health of Kim Jong Il. The elections also come after a significant cabinet shuffle in recent months that saw the replacement of at least five members of cabinet. The elections were called for 8 March 2009 allowing leave for a 60-day campaign period.

After dissolution, nominating committees in all 687 districts nominated Kim Jong Il to stand for election. The 333rd district was the first to file their nomination, so he decided to run in that district. In the previous assembly, Kim Jong Il represented the 649th election district.

== Electoral system ==
Voter registration was conducted by the Resident Registration Bureaus of the National Security Agency. Completing the lists of voters also had the side effect of discovering missing residents who might have defected and left the country. Allegations had surfaced of bribes being paid to officials conducting registration drives to declare family members who have defected as being deceased. The voter registration deadline for the election took place on 4 March 2009.

The bribes themselves have been overlooked by the National Security Agency as the North Korean government demands the lists be complete to ensure that there is 100% turnout in the vote. It is easier to explain missing persons as being dead than to have an incomplete list of voters.

The voting for deputies of the Supreme People's Assembly in 2009 consisted of using paper ballots containing the name of a single candidate nominated in each district. To indicate support for the candidate, a ballot was dropped into the box unmarked. If the voter did not support a candidate, that voter had to cross out the name of the candidate before dropping the ballot.

The voting method was a departure from prior elections. In previous elections, the system consisted of two ballot boxes at each polling station. The boxes, one black and one white, were to indicate support for or against a candidate. There was no system in place to handle absentee ballots for North Koreans living abroad and there did not appear to be a system of advanced voting in place. Proxy votes were ordered to be cast by family members of North Korean defectors who were detained in prisons within China. All voting and the validation of official returns was overseen by the Central Election Committee.

Voting was supposed to be a secret process, but with the method of casting ballots, it became obvious who was opposed to the candidates. The voter had the option of going to a booth to cross out the name or dropping the ballot directly in the box. Penalties for voting against a candidate or not voting were severe. Electors who refused to vote were sent to labor camps. A member of the National Security Agency was stationed at every polling station to keep an eye out for people who used or looked at the red pen.

== Conduct ==
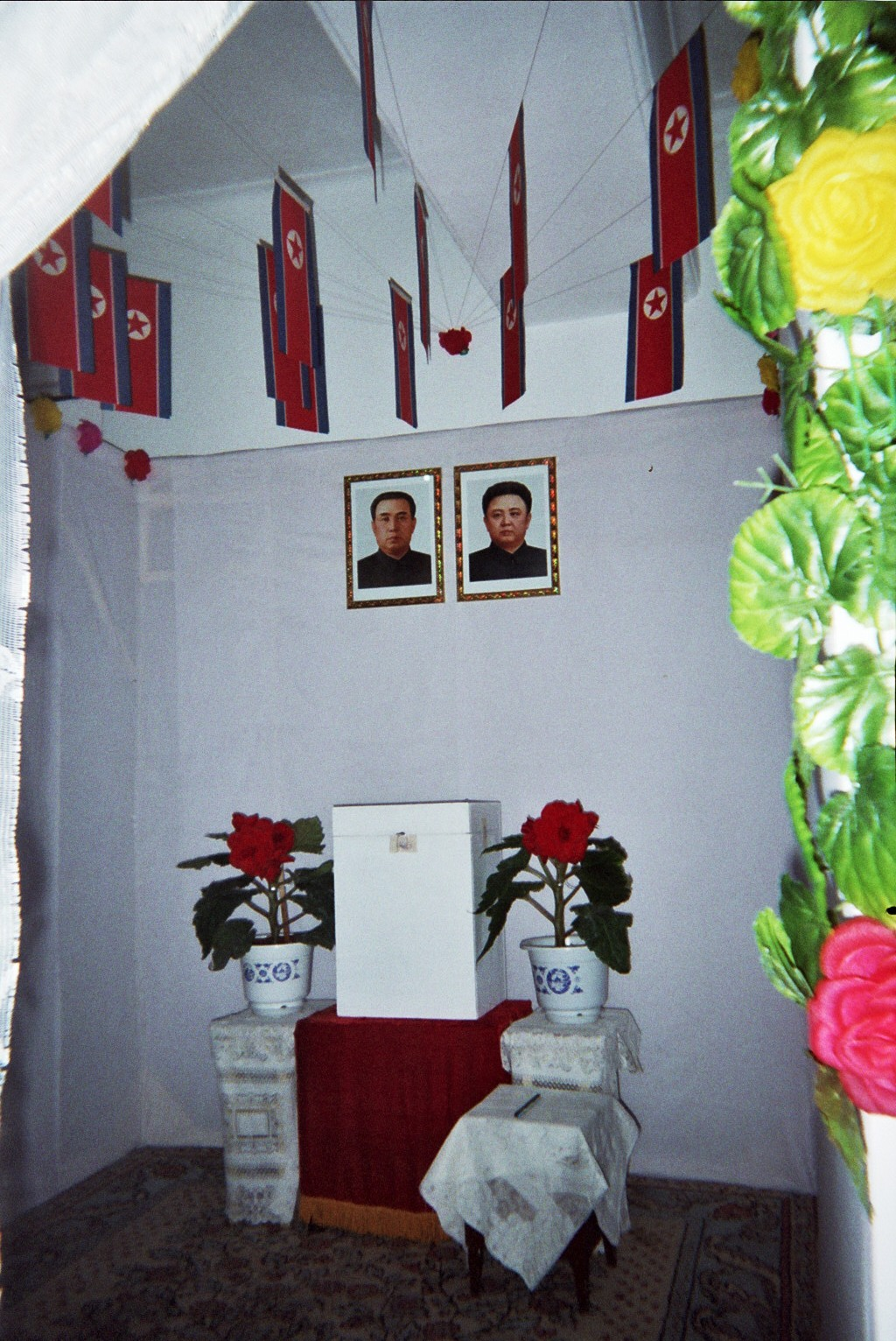
An election polling station in North Korea.

Election day began with editorials being published in all state run media, encouraging voter participation. Voting officially began at 9:00am local time. Mobile polling stations were dispatched to infirm residents who could not travel to polling stations to cast ballots. Citizens of foreign nations resident in North Korea were also encouraged to come out and cast a ballot if they so wished.

By noon on election day, the Korean Central News Agency had reported that 71% of registered North Korean voters had turned out to cast ballots.

Voters in North Korea had dressed up for election day, wearing suits and chosŏn-ot, traditional Korean dresses.

I cast a ballot of patriotism, a ballot of approval with a mind to strengthen our socialist system—the best in the world, as firm as a rock.

— Kim Un Kyong, a North Korean factory worker

The most watched race of the election was district 333 where leader Kim Jong Il was running. On 9 March 2009, North Korean media announced that Kim Jong Il was unanimously re-elected to parliament. The election committee also stated that 99.98% of all registered voters took part in voting, with 100% voting for their candidate in each district.

The election was a largely peaceful event, but some vandalism of candidate posters, along with anti-election graffiti, occurred in Mundeuk, South Pyongan Province. Signage had also been changed on polling stations, as official signage was replaced with new signs misspelling "election booth."

Peter Hughes, the British ambassador to North Korea, garnered significant outrage and controversy from around the world after he blogged about the election having a festive atmosphere. The outrage was caused by claims that his blog read more like an official North Korean press release as he did not mention in his blog the negative aspects of the election, such as citizens being forced to vote and that there was only a single candidate to vote for.

== Results ==
Official election results were announced by the Central Election Commission in March 2009. The official results showed 324 of the 687 Deputies had been replaced and were new to power with the rest being re-elected. A large portion of the Deputies elected were to fill vacancies from those who died. No form of appointment or by-elections currently exists to put Deputies into the Supreme Peoples Assembly between elections.

Party or alliance		Votes	%	Seats
Fatherland Front	Workers' Party of Korea		100	606
Fatherland Front	Korean Social Democratic Party		100	50
Fatherland Front	Chondoist Chongu Party		100	22
Fatherland Front	Chongryon		100	6
Fatherland Front	Independents		100	3
Total				687
Registered voters/turnout			99.98	
Source: IPU

=== Elected members ===
The following were elected as members of parliament:

1. Electoral District: Ri Ul-sol
2. Electoral District: Kim Yong-bok
3. Electoral District: Kim Kyong-hui
4. Electoral District: Kang Jun-ho
5. Electoral District: Kim Yong-nam
6. Electoral District: Im Man-soon
7. Electoral District: Ryoo Chung-ryol
8. Electoral District: Kim Bok-nam
9. Electoral District: Hong So-hon
10. Electoral District: Tak Hua-suk
11. Electoral District: Mun Sang-min
12. Electoral District: Ri Tong-chan
13. Electoral District: Mun Son-bul
14. Electoral District: Kim Sok-nam
15. Electoral District: Sin Yong-chol
16. Electoral District: Pak Pong-nam
17. Electoral District: Pak Kyu-hong
18. Electoral District: Cho Myong-lok
19. Electoral District: Kim In-nam
20. Electoral District: Ri Jae-kang
21. Electoral District: Kim Kwang-chul
22. Electoral District: Kim Yong-ju
23. Electoral District: Choe Hong-Il
24. Electoral District: Ho Jong-suk
25. Electoral District: Kim Kyong-su
26. Electoral District: Kim Song-hi
27. Electoral District: Ri Myung-ok
28. Electoral District: Song Chun-sik
29. Electoral District: Yuk Sok-chon
30. Electoral District: Hwang Kil-chol
31. Electoral District: Jang Song-thaek
32. Electoral District: Ri Kyong-il
33. Electoral District: Kim Ung-kwan
34. Electoral District: Kim Dong-pyut
35. Electoral District: Byon Sseub-ho
36. Electoral District: Ri Yong-mu
37. Electoral District: Ri Sun-im
38. Electoral District: Kim Song-hui
39. Electoral District: Jong Dong-du
40. Electoral District: Song Ja-reeb
41. Electoral District: Yun Ki-jong
42. Electoral District: O Kuk-ryol
43. Electoral District: Kang Nam-ik
44. Electoral District: Jon Kyong-su
45. Electoral District: Kim Yong-nam
46. Electoral District: Ri Kun-il
47. Electoral District: Pak Kwan-o
48. Electoral District: Kang Son-ju
49. Electoral District: Kim Myong-hwan
50. Electoral District: Byun Yong-reeb
51. Electoral District: Jong Kwang-hyuk
52. Electoral District: Jong Dal-son
53. Electoral District: Kim Hua-suk
54. Electoral District: Jong Hyon-yong
55. Electoral District: Ri Yong-chol
56. Electoral District: Kim Sae-myong
57. Electoral District: Kim Ki-nam
58. Electoral District: Kim Ho Jae
59. Electoral District: Han Jong-hyuk
60. Electoral District: Kim Bok-sil
61. Electoral District: Kim Kyong-ok
62. Electoral District: Pak Hui-kwan
63. Electoral District: Riu Mi-yong
64. Electoral District: Jon Hui-suk
65. Electoral District: Jo Yon-jae
66. Electoral District: Kim Song-kyu
67. Electoral District: Kim Yang-gon
68. Electoral District: Kang Ki-som
69. Electoral District: Ri Hua-sil
70. Electoral District: Ri Sung-ho
71. Electoral District: Pak Jin-sik
72. Electoral District: Rho Jong-nam
73. Electoral District: Choe Ik-kyu
74. Electoral District: Jon Jin-suh
75. Electoral District: Kim Kuk-tae
76. Electoral District: Ho Song-kil
77. Electoral District: Noh Kwang-chol
78. Electoral District: Hui Yong-ae
79. Electoral District: Kim Yu-ho
80. Electoral District: Kim Jong-su
81. Electoral District: Lim Nam-su
82. Electoral District: Ri Ung-chan
83. Electoral District: Kim Jong-lin
84. Electoral District: Ri Yong-chol
85. Electoral District: An In-Kon
86. Electoral District: Ri Jae-il
87. Electoral District: Jang Chul
88. Electoral District: So Ju-chong
89. Electoral District: Pak Kil-nam
90. Electoral District: Kim Bong-sil
91. Electoral District: Kim Si-hak
92. Electoral District: Ri Kil-song
93. Electoral District: Ri Ryong-nam
94. Electoral District: Sin O-sun
95. Electoral District: Han Chol
96. Electoral District: Kim Chol-min
97. Electoral District: Kim Yong-dae
98. Electoral District: Jong Myong-sun
99. Electoral District: Jae Hui-jong
100. Electoral District: Kim Yong-il
101. Electoral District: Kim Duk-sam
102. Electoral District: Pak Nam-ki
103. Electoral District: Kil Chol-hyuk
104. Electoral District: La Dong-hui
105. Electoral District: Yang Hyong-sop
106. Electoral District: Kim Sun-hua
107. Electoral District: Ha Ung-chun
108. Electoral District: Im Jong-sil
109. Electoral District: Cha Sung-suh
110. Electoral District: Kim Myong-hak
111. Electoral District: Ryang Jang-kyun
112. Electoral District: Kim Yong-song
113. Electoral District: Jong Myong-jo
114. Electoral District: Ji Dong-sik
115. Electoral District: Min Kyong-nam
116. Electoral District: Hong Kwang-il
117. Electoral District: Kim Jong-suk
118. Electoral District: Jin Yong-il
119. Electoral District: Kim Hyoung-nam
120. Electoral District: Kim Ui-sun
121. Electoral District: Kim Ki-ryong
122. Electoral District: Han Jong-hua
123. Electoral District: Ro Song-sil
124. Electoral District: Kim Huan-suh
125. Electoral District: Ri Kwang-ho
126. Electoral District: Choe Yong-rim
127. Electoral District: Pak Yong-sun
128. Electoral District: Koh Myong-hui
129. Electoral District: Yu Jang-sok
130. Electoral District: Kim Yong-gil
131. Electoral District: Lim Don-hua
132. Electoral District: Choe Ryong-ik
133. Electoral District: Ju Myong-son
134. Electoral District: Pak Sun-nyo
135. Electoral District: Yu Pom-sun
136. Electoral District: Jon Il-chun
137. Electoral District: Paek Song-nam
138. Electoral District: Choe-Ung-kwon
139. Electoral District: Jo Kyong-chil
140. Electoral District: Hwang Hak-won
141. Electoral District: Chae Jang-dong
142. Electoral District: Kim Kyong-son
143. Electoral District: Kim Kwang-yon
144. Electoral District: Kim Kum-suk
145. Electoral District: Pak Chun-dam
146. Electoral District: Jon Yong-sik
147. Electoral District: Ri Kyong-ryol
148. Electoral District: Kim Jong-myong
149. Electoral District: Ri Man-ho
150. Electoral District: Kim Sun-jib
151. Electoral District: Hyon Sok-kil
152. Electoral District: Kim Ki-kun
153. Electoral District: Kim Kwang-yong
154. Electoral District: Pak Yun-il
155. Electoral District: Kim Ok-ryon
156. Electoral District: Moon Myong-hak
157. Electoral District: Kim Jong-im
158. Electoral District: Kwong Hyuk-bong
159. Electoral District: Kim Dok-il
160. Electoral District: Jang Ung
161. Electoral District: Choe Ji-son
162. Electoral District: Pyo Hui-song
163. Electoral District: Yong Man-sik
164. Electoral District: Kil Lyae-suh
165. Electoral District: Kim Hyo
166. Electoral District: Kim Yong-hua
167. Electoral District: Kim Hong-kon
168. Electoral District: Ryang Suh-jong
169. Electoral District: Sin Ung-sik
170. Electoral District: Ri Sung-ho
171. Electoral District: Kim Yong-il
172. Electoral District: Kim Yon-hua
173. Electoral District: Ri Nyong-kun
174. Electoral District: Jo Won-taek
175. Electoral District: Kim Myong-il
176. Electoral District: Choe Jong-ryul
177. Electoral District: Kim Chol-ung
178. Electoral District: Hyon Ung-sil
179. Electoral District: Kim Myong-hui
180. Electoral District: Kim Hyong-sik
181. Electoral District: Sin An-son
182. Electoral District: Ho Thaek
183. Electoral District: An Kuk-thae
184. Electoral District: Ro Tu-chol
185. Electoral District: Lee Kyo-man
186. Electoral District: Ko Chang-suh
187. Electoral District: Son Suk-kun
188. Electoral District: Won Jong-sam
189. Electoral District: Jon Chang-rim
190. Electoral District: So Lan-hui
191. Electoral District: Ri Hak-song
192. Electoral District: Kim Jae-hua
193. Electoral District: Kim Jong-kil
194. Electoral District: Han Uh-chol
195. Electoral District: Lo Bae-kwon
196. Electoral District: Kim Bong-suh
197. Electoral District: Jang Man-chol
198. Electoral District: Ri Ju-o
199. Electoral District: Kim Hyae-yong
200. Electoral District: Pak Jong-kun
201. Electoral District: Choe Chil-nam
202. Electoral District: Kang Ryon-hak
203. Electoral District: Sin Jae-won
204. Electoral District: Ri Myong-chol
205. Electoral District: Kim Yong-sun
206. Electoral District: Song Kwong-chol
207. Electoral District: Kwak Chol-ho
208. Electoral District: Mun Bong-ryong
209. Electoral District: Choe Yong-dok
210. Electoral District: Kim Hua-yong
211. Electoral District: Pak Kyong-sam
212. Electoral District: An Dong-chun
213. Electoral District: Kim Jae-ryong
214. Electoral District: Ho Sang-jong
215. Electoral District: Kim Chang-jon
216. Electoral District: Kim Jong
217. Electoral District: Jon Yong-son
218. Electoral District: O Ik-jae
219. Electoral District: Ri Hong-sam
220. Electoral District: Pak Myong-hun
221. Electoral District: Kim Hui-suk
222. Electoral District: Kim Ik-chol
223. Electoral District: Ri Yong Jun
224. Electoral District: Pak Myong-son
225. Electoral District: Pak Hak-son
226. Electoral District: Jon Kyong-son
227. Electoral District: Kim In-sun
228. Electoral District: Choe Kwong-chol
229. Electoral District: Kim Hak-chol
230. Electoral District: Hong Son-ok
231. Electoral District: Jong Myong-hak
232. Electoral District: Kim Kum-sil
233. Electoral District: Kim Jong-hyup
234. Electoral District: Kim Dang-suh
235. Electoral District: Paek Bok-nam
236. Electoral District: Kim Byong-ryul
237. Electoral District: Cha Myong-ok
238. Electoral District: Kim Kyo-kwon
239. Electoral District: Choe Hyuk-chol
240. Electoral District: Jang Jae-an
241. Electoral District: Ryang Kyong-bok
242. Electoral District: Tong Jong-ho
243. Electoral District: Ho Jong-ok
244. Electoral District: Ri Chol-man
245. Electoral District: So Chun-yong
246. Electoral District: Kim Pyong-hae
247. Electoral District: Pak Chun-kon
248. Electoral District: Kang Nung-su
249. Electoral District: Thae Hyong-chol
250. Electoral District: Yun Dong-hyon
251. Electoral District: Uh Sun-yong
252. Electoral District: Kim Byong-hun
253. Electoral District: Han Byong-man
254. Electoral District: Ri Ki-suh
255. Electoral District: Jong Son-mun
256. Electoral District: Pak Song-sil
257. Electoral District: Suh Un-ki
258. Electoral District: Ri Kyong-bom
259. Electoral District: Kim Uh-chol
260. Electoral District: Kim Bong-il
261. Electoral District: Kim Yun-sok
262. Electoral District: Jon Ho-chol
263. Electoral District: Jo Song-yun
264. Electoral District: An Yong-hyun
265. Electoral District: Jim Kyong-hui
266. Electoral District: Ri Sang-kun
267. Electoral District: O Ung-chang
268. Electoral District: Ri Kwong-kon
269. Electoral District: So Sung-chol
270. Electoral District: Yun Chol-yong
271. Electoral District: Kim Kwong-lin
272. Electoral District: Ri Yong-min
273. Electoral District: An Min-chol
274. Electoral District: Mun Jae-chol
275. Electoral District: Jong Yong-suh
276. Electoral District: Yo Min-hyon
277. Electoral District: Kim Byong-hua
278. Electoral District: Jong Ok-dong
279. Electoral District: Kang Chu-ryon
280. Electoral District: Kim Young-kil
281. Electoral District: Ri Hui-chon
282. Electoral District: An Min-hul
283. Electoral District: Ri Jong-kuk
284. Electoral District: Pak Jong-jin
285. Electoral District: Jong Chang-ryol
286. Electoral District: An Sung-ok
287. Electoral District: Kang Yong-sop
288. Electoral District: Pak Chun-sam
289. Electoral District: Kim Ung-chol
290. Electoral District: Kang Kil-yong
291. Electoral District: Paek Nam-il
292. Electoral District: Kim Yong-ho
293. Electoral District: Hong Kum-son
294. Electoral District: Hong Chol-soo
295. Electoral District: Ji Sang-min
296. Electoral District: Hwang Yun-nam
297. Electoral District: Ryo Won-ku
298. Electoral District: Kang Chang-uk
299. Electoral District: Kim Il-ho
300. Electoral District: Kye Yong-sam
301. Electoral District: Pak Sun-hui
302. Electoral District: Mun Ung-jo
303. Electoral District: Ho Nam-sun
304. Electoral District: Sun Kyong-nam
305. Electoral District: Kim Chun-ryo
306. Electoral District: Kim Dong-jin
307. Electoral District: Ri Su-yong
308. Electoral District: Ri Jong-mu
309. Electoral District: Yun Yang-kyun
310. Electoral District: Jo Kum-suk
311. Electoral District: Jin Sang-chol
312. Electoral District: Kim Rak-hui
313. Electoral District: Jo Il-ki
314. Electoral District: Ko In-ho
315. Electoral District: Kim Ok-kyu
316. Electoral District: Yun Ryang-sok
317. Electoral District: Choe Yong-nam
318. Electoral District: Ku Myong-ok
319. Electoral District: Kim Chang-sik
320. Electoral District: Ri Tae-sik
321. Electoral District: Kwon Tae-mun
322. Electoral District: Shin Son-ho
323. Electoral District: An Chun-sop
324. Electoral District: Kim Yoo-kun
325. Electoral District: Choe Eun
326. Electoral District: Ri Chun-hui
327. Electoral District: Song Hyo-nam
328. Electoral District: Pak Song-ho
329. Electoral District: Ri Byong-chol
330. Electoral District: Cha Jun-sik
331. Electoral District: Shim Jae-ul
332. Electoral District: Choe Young-ho
333. Electoral District: Kim Jong Il
334. Electoral District: Kim Jong-kwan
335. Electoral District: Kim Yoo-ho
336. Electoral District: Song Jun-taek
337. Electoral District: Han Sang-sun
338. Electoral District: Jong Myong-do
339. Electoral District: Pak Won-sik
340. Electoral District: Kim Jong-gak
341. Electoral District: Kim Jin-chol
342. Electoral District: Jun Il
343. Electoral District: Kim Myong-kuk
344. Electoral District: O Kwang-sik
345. Electoral District: Ju Jong-kyong
346. Electoral District: Jo Kyong-chol
347. Electoral District: Ri Yong Kil
348. Electoral District: Kim Yong-chun
349. Electoral District: Ho Song-il
350. Electoral District: Kim Kwan-chol
351. Electoral District: Kim Kum-chol
352. Electoral District: Han Jong-jin
353. Electoral District: Kim Chol
354. Electoral District: Ri Song-guk
355. Electoral District: Byon In-son
356. Electoral District: Kim Kwong-il
357. Electoral District: Pak Sung-won
358. Electoral District: Ri Song-bok
359. Electoral District: Jae Mun-sok
360. Electoral District: Lim Kong-yun
361. Electoral District: Hyon Yong-chol
362. Electoral District: Choe Bu-gil
363. Electoral District: Ju Sun-chol
364. Electoral District: Ri Jong-bu
365. Electoral District: Yun Kyong-so
366. Electoral District: Kim Chun-sam
367. Electoral District: Ju Song-nam
368. Electoral District: Choe Song-un
369. Electoral District: Ri Si-joong
370. Electoral District: Kim Kwang-hyon
371. Electoral District: Chon Jae-kwon
372. Electoral District: Kim Won-hong
373. Electoral District: Kim Bae-jong
374. Electoral District: Ri Yong-ho
375. Electoral District: Ri Song-sun
376. Electoral District: Hyon Chol-hae
377. Electoral District: Pak Dong-hak
378. Electoral District: Yon Hak-song
379. Electoral District: Yon Jong-lin
380. Electoral District: Kim Song-dok
381. Electoral District: Ri Kuk-jun
382. Electoral District: Kim Yong-jom
383. Electoral District: Ju Sang-song
384. Electoral District: Ji Yong-chun
385. Electoral District: Kim Jong-ho
386. Electoral District: Kim Chong-sup
387. Electoral District: U Tong-chuk
388. Electoral District: Ryu Kyong
389. Electoral District: Paek Sol
390. Electoral District: Song Yun-hui
391. Electoral District: Bong Chan-ho
392. Electoral District: Jong Myong-sil
393. Electoral District: Jo Hae-suk
394. Electoral District: Jo Hae-suk
395. Electoral District: Choe Thae-bok
396. Electoral District: Chae Kang-hwan
397. Electoral District: Kwak Pom-gi
398. Electoral District: Kim Chung-kal
399. Electoral District: Pak Jae-pil
400. Electoral District: Kim Chol-kuk
401. Electoral District: Ryang Hui-chol
402. Electoral District: Hwang Sun-hui
403. Electoral District: Ko Kyu-il
404. Electoral District: La Chang-ryol
405. Electoral District: Ri Chol-ho
406. Electoral District: Lo Ik-hua
407. Electoral District: Ri Won-il
408. Electoral District: Kim Yong-ae
409. Electoral District: Choe Song-won
410. Electoral District: Kang Min-chol
411. Electoral District: Choe Jang-son
412. Electoral District: Lim Song-bok
413. Electoral District: Kim Mu-jon
414. Electoral District: Kim Jong-ok
415. Electoral District: Ho Jong-man
416. Electoral District: Ri Sae-yuk
417. Electoral District: Han Dong-kun
418. Electoral District: Ri Song-chol
419. Electoral District: Ko Byong-som
420. Electoral District: Min Dong-sik
421. Electoral District: Choe Han-chun
422. Electoral District: Ri Song-ho
423. Electoral District: Liu Myong-kum
424. Electoral District: Hwang In-bom
425. Electoral District: Choe Ryong-hae
426. Electoral District: Choe Yong-son
427. Electoral District: Ri Sung-jin
428. Electoral District: Pak Myong-sik
429. Electoral District: Kim Hui-bong
430. Electoral District: Kim Ji-song
431. Electoral District: Ri Song-kwan
432. Electoral District: Ri Chol-ho
433. Electoral District: Pak Ui-chun
434. Electoral District: Choe Kwang-chol
435. Electoral District: Pak Yong-pal
436. Electoral District: Ri Chun-il
437. Electoral District: Ju Jin-kuh
438. Electoral District: Hwang Bong-yong
439. Electoral District: Ri Chol (Ri Su-yong)
440. Electoral District: Ri Jong-hyuk
441. Electoral District: An Kyong-ho
442. Electoral District: Ri Kyo-sang
443. Electoral District: Ri Chon-bok
444. Electoral District: Sok Yon-su
445. Electoral District: Han Song-chol
446. Electoral District: Kim Dong-un
447. Electoral District: Jon Byong-ho
448. Electoral District: Kwak Yong-nam
449. Electoral District: Choe Song-kon
450. Electoral District: Kim Hae-lin
451. Electoral District: Kim Kwong-ju
452. Electoral District: Ju Byong-ju
453. Electoral District: Paek Se-bong
454. Electoral District: Kim Chol
455. Electoral District: Son Yong-ung
456. Electoral District: Jo Sae-yong
457. Electoral District: Kang Jong-nam
458. Electoral District: An Sung-hui
459. Electoral District: Choe Chan-kon
460. Electoral District: Kim Chun-il
461. Electoral District: Jong Chun-sil
462. Electoral District: Ju Kyu-chang
463. Electoral District: Lyom Hui-ryong
464. Electoral District: Pak To-chun
465. Electoral District: Sin Kwan-jin
466. Electoral District: Lo Hae-sun
467. Electoral District: Kim Chae-lan
468. Electoral District: Kim Kwang-chol
469. Electoral District: Lyom In-yun
470. Electoral District: Ri Chang-han
471. Electoral District: Choe Ki-ryong
472. Electoral District: Ri Sung-kwan
473. Electoral District: Kim In-nam
474. Electoral District: Pak Kum-hui
475. Electoral District: Lim Yong-hua
476. Electoral District: Kang Byong-hu
477. Electoral District: Ri Yong-don
478. Electoral District: Sim Sang-dae
479. Electoral District: Kim Ryong-sil
480. Electoral District: Ri Jong-suk
481. Electoral District: Kim Du-hyon
482. Electoral District: Byon Ung-kyu
483. Electoral District: Hong Sok-jin
484. Electoral District: Kim Won-il
485. Electoral District: So Man-sul
486. Electoral District: Lyu Yong-som
487. Electoral District: Kim Kwong-il
488. Electoral District: Han Won-il
489. Electoral District: Kim Yon-hyuk
490. Electoral District: Ri Il-som
491. Electoral District: Kwon Kum-ryong
492. Electoral District: Kim Jin-kyu
493. Electoral District: Kim Jong-sim
494. Electoral District: Uh Du-tae
495. Electoral District: Ji Jong-kwan
496. Electoral District: Kim Yong-sik
497. Electoral District: Choe Hui-chong
498. Electoral District: So Jong-dok
499. Electoral District: Sin Tae-song
500. Electoral District: Son Kum-hwal
501. Electoral District: Jon Song-ung
502. Electoral District: Kim Yong-chae
503. Electoral District: Kim In-bok
504. Electoral District: Jo Chung-han
505. Electoral District: O Kwang-chol
506. Electoral District: Sim Sang-jin
507. Electoral District: O Ryong-il
508. Electoral District: Ri Hwan-ki
509. Electoral District: Mun Yong-chol
510. Electoral District: Ri Chol-pong
511. Electoral District: Sim Il-chol
512. Electoral District: Bae Myong-sik
513. Electoral District: Kang Pil-hun
514. Electoral District: Kim Hong-su
515. Electoral District: Pak Jae-kyong
516. Electoral District: Choe Yong-hyuk
517. Electoral District: Kim Il-chol
518. Electoral District: Paek Jong-sun
519. Electoral District: Han Chun-sik
520. Electoral District: Ri Song-ho
521. Electoral District: Choe Jin-su
522. Electoral District: Kim Song-hun
523. Electoral District: Kim Hyon-jin
524. Electoral District: Kim Tae-son
525. Electoral District: Sim Jong-taek
526. Electoral District: Jong Sun-kum
527. Electoral District: Choe Jong-sik
528. Electoral District: Kim Pung-ki
529. Electoral District: Kim Chol-won
530. Electoral District: Sok Won-chun
531. Electoral District: Song Kwang-dok
532. Electoral District: Kim Su-jo
533. Electoral District: Jang Byong-tae
534. Electoral District: Nam Yong-hal
535. Electoral District: Kang Hyong-pyo
536. Electoral District: Kim Ki-uh
537. Electoral District: Jong Yong-chol
538. Electoral District: Yu Kyong-hak
539. Electoral District: Kim Sung-chol
540. Electoral District: JongYong-kil
541. Electoral District: Kim Sok-sun
542. Electoral District: Ri Jong-son
543. Electoral District: Ri Chong-hua
544. Electoral District: Sin Byong-kang
545. Electoral District: Kim Sung-nam
546. Electoral District: Ri Yong-chol
547. Electoral District: Ri Yong-ae
548. Electoral District: Ri Yong-su
549. Electoral District: Kim Song-ki
550. Electoral District: Bee Dal-sun
551. Electoral District: Mun Yong-son
552. Electoral District: Chu Yong-suk
553. Electoral District: Ri Chu-ok
554. Electoral District: Jon Kil-su
555. Electoral District: Yu Kyong-suk
556. Electoral District: Ri Hyo-son
557. Electoral District: Liu Kyong-ok
558. Electoral District: Jong Dok-yong
559. Electoral District: Pak In-ju
560. Electoral District: Kim Man-sang
561. Electoral District: Ri Kwang-nam
562. Electoral District: Ho Hak
563. Electoral District: Jong Byong-kun
564. Electoral District: Jong Myong-hak
565. Electoral District: Choe Hyon
566. Electoral District: Ju Sung-sun
567. Electoral District: Kong Sung-il
568. Electoral District: Ri Mu-yong
569. Electoral District: Kim Chol-yong
570. Electoral District: Min Byong-chol
571. Electoral District: Kim Pong-chol
572. Electoral District: Km Din-ku
573. Electoral District: Sin Chol-ho
574. Electoral District: Kim Hua-wal
575. Electoral District: Jon Dee-won
576. Electoral District: Ri Jae-son
577. Electoral District: Song Chun-som
578. Electoral District: Ri Ho-lim
579. Electoral District: Pak Thae-won
580. Electoral District: Sun Hyon-nom
581. Electoral District: Pak Yong-lee
582. Electoral District: O Ryong-deek
583. Electoral District: Kim Su-gil
584. Electoral District: O Su-yong
585. Electoral District: Jo Myong-rok
586. Electoral District: Kim Won-su
587. Electoral District: Han Jong-bin
588. Electoral District: Jon Ku-kang
589. Electoral District: Ko Son-ok
590. Electoral District: Song Yong-sin
591. Electoral District: Jong Mun-su
592. Electoral District: Choe In-ho
593. Electoral District: Jon Hae-song
594. Electoral District: Kim Byong-pal
595. Electoral District: Hong Song-nam
596. Electoral District: Ri Mun-yong
597. Electoral District: Pak Chang-dok
598. Electoral District: Lio Chun-sok
599. Electoral District: Jyo Bong-chun
600. Electoral District: Jang Chun-kun
601. Electoral District: Ri Mun-bong
602. Electoral District: Kim Jae-dong
603. Electoral District: Hwang Yong-sam
604. Electoral District: Kim Kwang-suk
605. Electoral District: Kim Chong-sun
606. Electoral District: Choe Kwan-su
607. Electoral District: Ri Chol-ho
608. Electoral District: Hwang Kang-chol
609. Electoral District: Kim Kum-ok
610. Electoral District: Jong Yong-su
611. Electoral District: Kang Yong-tae
612. Electoral District: Kim Song-ho
613. Electoral District: Kim Yong-chol
614. Electoral District: Jo Sun-sil
615. Electoral District: Cha Kyong-il
616. Electoral District: Ja Chong-kun
617. Electoral District: Bang Kwan-bok
618. Electoral District: Li Tae-som
619. Electoral District: Pak Song-ki
620. Electoral District: Kim Yong-jin
621. Electoral District: Kim Ryong-kun
622. Electoral District: Ha Sae-un
623. Electoral District: Song Sun-lyo
624. Electoral District: Yun Byong-sok
625. Electoral District: Pak Hui-dok
626. Electoral District: Choe Kwan-chun
627. Electoral District: Dong Hun
628. Electoral District: O Sae-kwan
629. Electoral District: Kim Chun-kum
630. Electoral District: Tae Jong-hon
631. Electoral District: Li Jong-sik
632. Electoral District: Kim Tae-bong
633. Electoral District: Kim Chol-ho
634. Electoral District: Li Kwang-nam
635. Electoral District: Song Ryong-su
636. Electoral District: Ju Chun-som
637. Electoral District: Kim Min-suk
638. Electoral District: Ko Ki-hon
639. Electoral District: Jon Song-ho
640. Electoral District: Kim Yong-song
641. Electoral District: Song Kum-ok
642. Electoral District: Kim Hyong-chan
643. Electoral District: Jo Chang-bam
644. Electoral District: Ryang Yong-ho
645. Electoral District: Jon Sung-hun
646. Electoral District: Choe Kil-ju
647. Electoral District: Pyo Il-sok
648. Electoral District: Jin Byong-som
649. Electoral District: Ro Song-ung
650. Electoral District: Hwang Min
651. Electoral District: Ri Ku-ok
652. Electoral District: Song Jong-hui
653. Electoral District: Hong Sok-hyong
654. Electoral District: Kim Song-jong
655. Electoral District: Kim Son-won
656. Electoral District: Kim Chong-sik
657. Electoral District: Jon Kwang-lok
658. Electoral District: Sok Kil-ho
659. Electoral District: Kim Myong-sok
660. Electoral District: Pak Su-kil
661. Electoral District: Pak Dong-jun
662. Electoral District: Jong Yong-son
663. Electoral District: Pak Song-nam
664. Electoral District: Pak Kwang-chol
665. Electoral District: Ri Yong-jin
666. Electoral District: Hong Lin-som
667. Electoral District: Kim Su-yol
668. Electoral District: Kim Myong-hui
669. Electoral District: Han Myong-song
670. Electoral District: Choe Sae-kwan
671. Electoral District: Pak Chol-ho
672. Electoral District: So Hong-chan
673. Electoral District: Jong Hyong-suk
674. Electoral District: Ri Bong-juk
675. Electoral District: Jang In-suk
676. Electoral District: Ri Il-nam
677. Electoral District: Kim Kyong-ho
678. Electoral District: Kim Hyong-dok
679. Electoral District: Kim Dong-il
680. Electoral District: Jang Byong-kwan
681. Electoral District: An Mun-hak
682. Electoral District: Kim Chol
683. Electoral District: Choe Ki-jun
684. Electoral District: Om Ha-jin
685. Electoral District: Yon Tae-jong
686. Electoral District: Song Jong-su
687. Electoral District: Han Myong-kuk

== Reactions ==
The 2009 election in North Korea garnered significant attention from media agencies around the world. The attention was primarily to see if the potentially named successor to Kim Jong Il, Kim Jong Un, was standing for a seat to the Supreme People's Assembly. Rumors surfaced in the world media on 8 March 2009 that Kim Jong Un, the youngest son of Kim Jong Il, appeared on the ballot for the elections to the Supreme People's Assembly. The rumors also stated that following the election the new parliament "may also replace members of [Kim's] cabinet and the National Defense Commission, the top ruling agency."

The Central Election Commission, via the Korean Central News Agency, released the complete list of Deputies elected to the Supreme People's Assembly. The list showed that Kim Jong Un was not among those who were elected. The results left watchers of the regime in North Korea guessing as to the political future of the country.
