= Paek In-jun =

North Korean politician (1920–1999)

- 백인준

Standing Committee Vice Chairman of the Supreme People's Assembly
- In office 26 May 1990 – 5 September 1998

Personal details
- Born: 27 October 1920 Unsan County, Heianhoku-dō, Korea, Empire of Japan
- Died: 20 January 1999 (aged 78) Pyongyang, North Korea
- Resting place: Patriotic Martyrs' Cemetery, Pyongyang
- Citizenship: North Korea
- Party: Workers' Party of Korea
- Education: Pyongyang Gobo
- Alma mater: Rikkyo University

Korean name
- Hangul: 백인준
- RR: Baek Injun
- MR: Paek Injun

Paek In-jun (Korean: 백인준; 27 October 1920 – 20 January 1999) was a North Korean writer and politician who served as a member of the Supreme People's Assembly, North Korea's unicameral parliament.

== Biography ==
Paek was born in 1920 in Unsan County, Heianhoku-dō, Korea, Empire of Japan (now in North Pyongan Province, North Korea). He graduated from Pyongyang Gobo in 1938, studied theater in Seoul, and then moved to Japan to attend Rikkyo University. He returned to Pyongyang in 1946, where he became active in the General Union of North Korean Literature and Art. He participated in the Korean War as a military officer in the Korean People's Army, and was trusted with ideology and propaganda that thoroughly suited Kim Il Sung's tastes, and held key positions in the cabinet, including director of the Ministry of Culture. Since 1956, he has been an active writer for the Korea Writers' Union, and has served as the head of the North Pyongan Province branch of the Writers' Union, a writer for the Film and Literature Creation Company, and a writer. From the late 1960s, he became involved in film literature, producing films such as The Family of Choi Hak-shin and Among the Village People. He served as the head of the Baekdu Mountain Literary Creation Group, launched in 1968, where he also created the Five Revolutionary Operas. Based on this experience, he rose to the position of head of the Culture and Arts Department of the Administration Council. In 1985, he visited Seoul as the head of the art troupe of the North and South Korean hometown visiting delegation, and in the late 1980s, he served as chairman of the General Union of Korean Literature and Arts. In 1985 he participated in the writing of the script for One Second for a Feat film. In 1990 following the 1990 North Korean parliamentary election he became a member of the Supreme People's Assembly, North Korea's unicameral parliament and from 26 May 1990 to 5 September 1998 he served as Vice Chairman of the Standing Committee of the Supreme People's Assembly as well as Vice Chairman of the Supreme People's Assembly. In 1991, Paek In-jun Poetry Collection was published. In 1966, he was awarded the title of People's Artist (North Korea), and was the first North Korean artist to be awarded the title of Hero of Labour and the first artist who received the Order of Kim Il Sung in May 1980 and the National Reunification Prize. In 1994 following the death of Kim Il Sung, he was a member of its funeral commission. In July 1998 he was elected a member of the 10th convocation of the Supreme People's Assembly. He died in 1999.
