= Shaoyu Yuan =

American professor, scholar, and pundit

Shaoyu Yuan is an American professor, scholar, and pundit best known for his work in Soft Power, Chinese foreign policy, and digital diplomacy. He is a Visiting Assistant Professor at New York University's Center for Global Affairs in New York, New York.

== Career ==
Yuan's public profile is largely defined by his analysis of China's modern soft power apparatus and global digital narratives. He frequently appears on television and provides commentary on Sino-U.S. relations and Chinese foreign policy. He is a regular contributor and recognized expert whose writings and geopolitical analyses are frequently published in outlets such as The Washington Post, The Hill, The Diplomat, and The Conversation. Yuan is the author of two books and many scholarly publications. His most recent book is Reframing China: TikTok, Soft Power, and the Battle for Global Narratives.

He is also often interviewed about current events on international radio programs and his work has been quoted in international newspapers and periodicals such as The New York Times, The Wall Street Journal, BBC, Associated Press, The Economist, CBC, South China Morning Post, and The Guardian.

Yuan holds a Ph.D. from Rutgers University, a Master of Science from Northeastern University, and a Bachelor of Arts from Centre College.

== Punditry and Views ==
In an interview with The Wall Street Journal, Yuan argued that the Chinese Communist Party has recognized it cannot manufacture soft power "in a meeting room". Instead, he observes that Beijing's current strategy is to allow creativity to grow within established political boundaries, and then provide state support to successful commercial products.

Discussing the viral "being Chinese" meme trend with The New York Times in 2026, Yuan noted that the phenomenon demonstrates China's growing cultural cachet. He argued that such trends reflect a broader shift where online audiences are developing a deeper familiarity with Chinese aesthetics and lifestyle habits, engaging with the culture outside of its typical portrayal in the United States as a geopolitical threat. He has explored similar themes during appearances on NPR's All Things Considered.

In a July 2026 Washington Post op-ed, Yuan argued that China was "winning" that year's FIFA World Cup without fielding a team, as the ubiquity of Chinese sponsors and products at the tournament represented a form of soft power operating in plain sight.

== Selected Publications ==
- Hegemonic whiplash and the future of global order. (co-authored with Jun Xiang), International Affairs, 102 (6), 2007-2029. (2026).
- Reframing China: TikTok, Soft Power, and the Battle for Global Narratives (Palgrave Macmillan, 2026).
- World and war in the age of AI: cyber risk, deterrence, and decision-making in U.S.-China competition. Defence Studies (2026).
- Threading Influence: Fashion as a Medium for Chinese Soft Power. Cultural Sociology (2026).
- eSports and Gaming: China's Quest for Global Soft Power. (co-authored with Jun Xiang), East Asia (2025).
- From play to power: china's video games as instruments of soft power. The Pacific Review, 38(4), 728–749. (2025).
- Goodbye, Wolf Warrior: charting China's transition to a more accommodating diplomacy. International Affairs, 100 (5), 2217–2232. (2024).
- Can Smaller Powers Have Grand Strategies? The Case of Rwanda. (co-authored with Daniel Assamah), Insight on Africa, 15(1), 108-127. (2023).
- Tracing China's diplomatic transition to wolf warrior diplomacy and its implications. Humanit Soc Sci Commun 10, 837 (2023).
