= Kim Yong-dae =

Kim Yong-dae may refer to:

- Kim Yong-dae (footballer)
- Kim Yong-dae (politician)
