= Becoming Chinese =

Social media trend

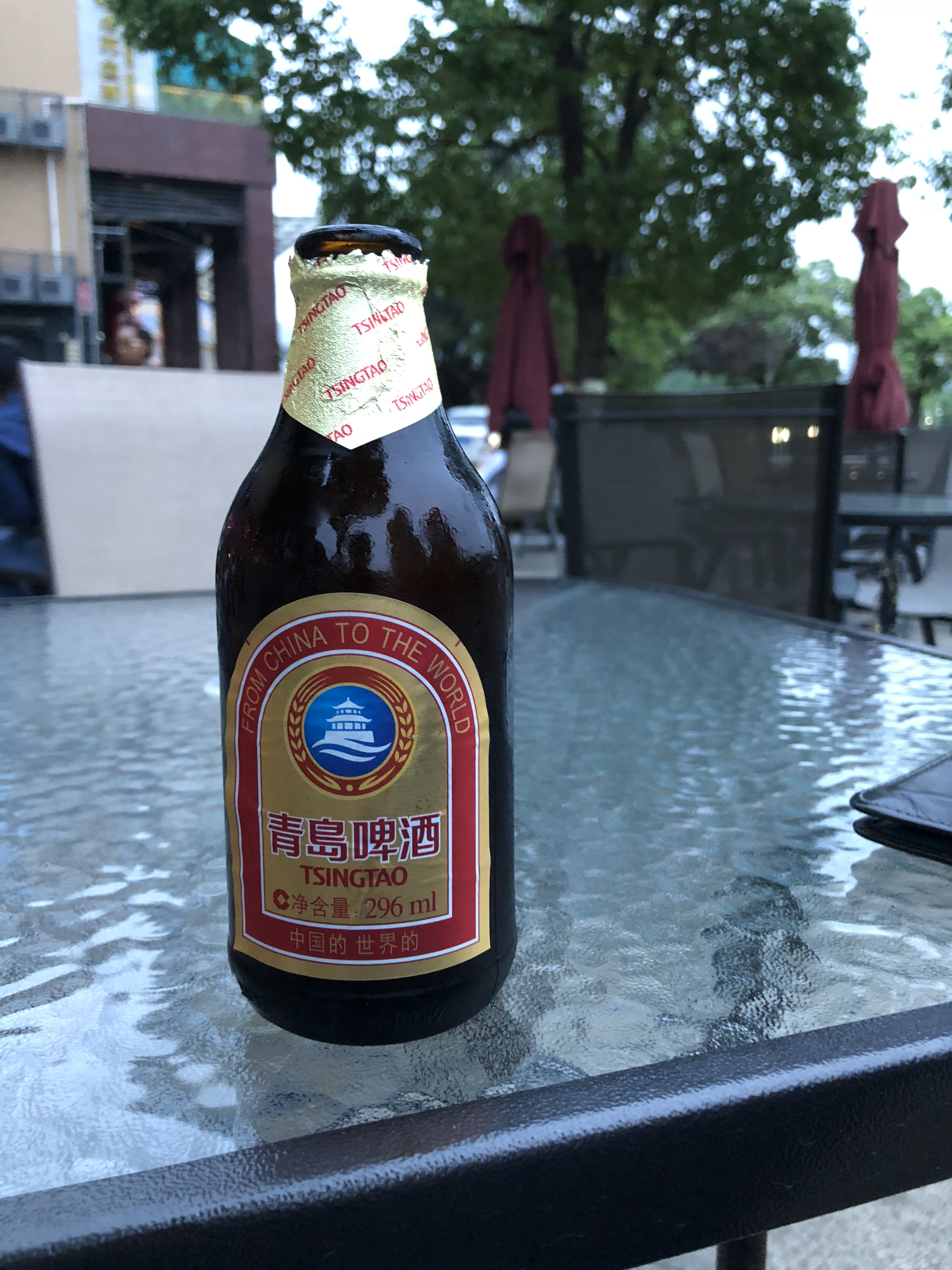
Tsingtao beer, the beverage of choice for one who is "becoming Chinese"

Becoming Chinese, (Note: Also known as "feeling Chinese", "Chinamaxxing", "declaring oneself Chinese", "being a Chinese baddie", or "being in a very Chinese time in one's life") also known as Chinamaxxing, is an internet meme and social media trend popularized by Generation Z during the mid-2020s associated with a growing affection for Chinese culture, society and philosophy as well as an open appreciation of the rise of China as a successful great power. It is particularly prevalent among those living in the Western world who choose to adopt Chinese lifestyles, technologies and other "Made in China" consumer products, or publicly express admiration for the transport, energy and public service infrastructures in the People's Republic of China.

The meme's origins date back to 2025, but it began widespread circulation across TikTok and other social media platforms in 2026, particularly following the second Trump administration's tariff wars and efforts to ban TikTok in the United States. The New York Times wrote that such memes could be considered "more of an absurdist joke, a wellness goal or a subtle, ironic expression of protest. Or all of the above."

== History ==
According to Le Parisien, a major contributor to the Chinamaxxing trend was American influencer IShowSpeed, whose live-streamed visit to China in March 2025 highlighted the country's technological advancements as well as cultural icons. On April 4, 2025, a Twitter user named "@girl__virus" posted a tweet stating, "you met me at a very chinese time in my life", a parody of the final line in the film Fight Club. Twitch streamer and left-wing influencer Hasan Piker used the term "Chinamaxxing" during his trip to China later that year.

By the end of 2025, a Chinese-American TikTok content creator named Sherry Zhu leaned into the meme by "posting a series of tongue-in-cheek videos instructing non-Chinese viewers on how to 'become Chinese' through their lifestyle choices". In one video, she stated, "Tomorrow, you're turning Chinese. I know it sounds intimidating, but resisting it now is pointless." Her videos garnered over 20 million views and inspired many content creators to follow her instructions. Many other content creators, both in Greater China and in the Chinese diaspora, then followed suit with Zhu's style of content, among them comedian Jimmy O. Yang.

In a BBC News article, Koh Ewe pointed out other developments in 2025 contributing to China's boosted image in lockstep with "Chinamaxxing", including but not limited to Labubu dolls, beverages like Luckin Coffee and Mixue Ice Cream & Tea, Adidas, hanfu and short-form content about cities like Chongqing, as well as a mass user migration to Xiaohongshu in early 2025 in the wake of the threat to ban TikTok in the United States that exposed Americans to the middle class quality of life in China. Livestreamed visits to Mainland China by popular influencers such as iShowSpeed and Hasan Piker in 2025 and the more lenient 10-day visa-free policy since late 2024 also boosted the appeal of tourism in China.

Beginning in 2026, many videos were posted depicting Americans adopting Chinese culture. Examples of such include drinking Tsingtao beer, walking with hands held behind one's back, eating congee, consuming traditional Chinese medicine, and drinking hot water. One spin on the trend involved becoming a "Chinese baddie" through acts like making hot soup, giving expensive fruits, or ordering drinks siu tim, siu bing (less sugar and less ice) or zou tim (sugar-free). Bloomberg News columnist Howard G. Chua-Eoan observed that some influencers also gave advice on how to order certain coveted apparel from Chinese companies on Taobao. Many aforementioned forms of engagement involve the declaration that one is "becoming" Chinese or "discovering" that one has been Chinese all along.

== Discourse ==
=== Reactions ===
Reactions to the social media trend have been mixed. Many Chinese content creators showed appreciation of newfound western attention and saw it as an opportunity to further spread Chinese culture, while others found it to be insincere and mocking. A video from the South China Morning Post said that although wellness advice shared by Chinese influencers was widely embraced in 2026, similar advice shared during the COVID-19 pandemic had been met with racist or xenophobic comments. An article by Charmaine Mok in the same news site pointed out that online discourse oscillated "between cultural appropriation and appreciation."

Zeyi Yang, writing in Wired, pointed out criticisms by some Chinese people of the meme, including that it was exoticizing Chinese culture for a convenient trend; that it lacked deeper understanding of "Chineseness"; and that it reflected a temporary, discardable, and disposable form of cultural engagement while "some of us are stuck being Chinese forever, including all the less fun parts that come with it."

Cliff Buddle, in an opinion piece for the South China Morning Post, argued that the meme, soon to "be the subject of academic research", was a positive force to forge "understanding and engagement" between Chinese culture and non-Chinese all around the world. Cathy Pham told Time that the meme is a form of "eating the other", a reference to an essay by feminist author bell hooks on how dominant groups "consume" marginalized cultures, reinforcing existing power structures. Chinamaxxing or 'becoming Chinese' is frequently translated as "sinicization" on Chinese social media, according to The Economist.

Jessie Yeung, writing in CNN, stated that the "global cultural capital" attained by China in this trend was different from that previously accrued by Japan and South Korea. Yeung opined that the difference was due in part to the latter two countries being "democracies and staunch US allies, while China is an authoritarian state and major US rival". Daniel Cheng of Jacobin wrote that the meme resembled "conservatives' fantasies about life in medieval times" with Chinamaxxers imagining themselves as "China's urban elite rather than the mass of impoverished gig workers who deliver their takeout."

RAND Corporation scholar Austin Horng-En Wang saw the trend as an "unilateral imagination of China from Western youth which differs from the actual lifestyles of Chinese people", and further alleged that some of these portrayals carried racist or sarcastic undertones. He also compared it to the Cozymaxxing trend in 2025, suggesting that it might simply be one of the many teenage trends.

=== Political implications ===
According to Cindy Yu, writing for The Times, the social media trend's rise coincided with Pew Research Center data showing that "under-34s viewed China much more favorably than over-50s in 16 of the 17 countries they polled" and could be a politically subversive response by American youth to "being told to hate China" in contemporary politics.

Similarly, Yan Zhuang wrote for The New York Times that the memes "may signal China's growing soft power abroad. For some American creators, they are also a wry expression of disillusionment with politics at home." Yan cited New York University professor Shaoyu Yuan, who identified the meme as both "meme logic" and "cultural cachet". Shaoyu Yuan also said the trend was a sign of China's increasing soft power, saying "you can see it most clearly in how Chinese culture and 'Chineseness' are becoming familiar, repeatable, and globally consumable in everyday life", but added that the more Chinese government officials frame the trend as part of the "China story," the more it may be received with skepticism.

Time found that the meme reflected American disillusionment with contemporary domestic politics and thus "a desire for an alternative model to the U.S." while also pointing out that the Chinese government itself was using social media as a tool for improved perceptions of China internationally; in particular, spokesperson Lin Jian said that flights to China during Chinese New Year "dramatically increased" in 2026. Nicole Chan, writing for the South China Morning Post, opined that the meme was less about infatuation with Chinese culture and more so a long-overdue recognition that "Chinese–built systems" like TikTok permeate internet life.

=== Chinese government response ===
Chinese foreign ministry spokesperson Lin Jian welcomed the international interest in Chinese daily life, when he was asked to comment about the "Becoming Chinese" trend on social media in February 2026. Specifically, Lin said it was a broader reflection of understanding Chinese culture beyond "traditional symbols, such as the Great Wall, kung fu, pandas, and Chinese cuisine".

The BBC said that the meme had stirred a limited response in China, but that state media tabloid the Global Times reported on it favourably as "Chinese lifestyles increasingly gain global appeal".

== See also ==
- Chinoiserie – European interpretation and imitation of Chinese and other East Asian artistic traditions
- Chinese Century – Idea that China may dominate the 21st century
- Sinophile – Someone with a strong interest in or love of Chinese people, culture, or history
- Orientalism – Imitation or depiction of Eastern cultures
