= National Reconciliation Council =

North Korean government organization

- Formation: 1998; 28 years ago
- Dissolved: January 12, 2024; 2 years ago
- Purpose: Facilitates visits from South Korea
- Location: North Korea
- Chairman: Kim Yong-dae
- Website: www.ryomyong.com

- National Reconciliation Council
- Hangul: 민족화해협의회
- Hanja: 民族和解協議會
- RR: Minjok hwahae hyeobuihoe
- MR: Minjok hwahae hyŏbŭihoe

The National Reconciliation Council (Korean: 민족화해협의회) was a North Korean organization whose purpose was to facilitate visits from South Korea to North Korea. Founded on 8 June 1998, its chairman was Kim Yong-dae. The first visit organized by the body was a 2001 visit to Mount Kumgang commemorating the 2000 inter-Korean summit. Most cultural, political, and religious visits from South Korea are through the National Reconciliation Council. The organization is occasionally cited in official news releases from the Korean Central News Agency. The organization was dissolved as part of a hostile change of policy towards South Korea in 2024.

== See also ==
- Democratic Front for the Reunification of the Fatherland
- Committee for the Peaceful Reunification of the Fatherland
