= Kang Sok-ju =

Vice Premier of North Korea from 2010 to 2016

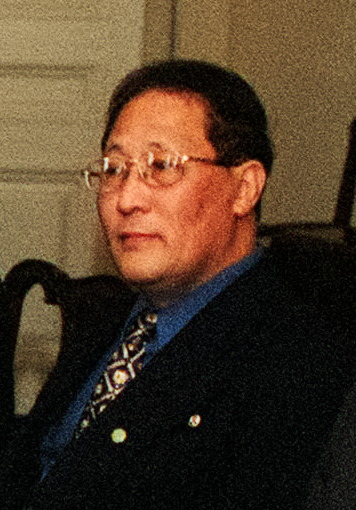

Vice Premier of North Korea
- In office September 2010 – May 2016
- Premier: Choe Yong-rim; Pak Pong-ju
- Supreme Leader: Kim Jong Un; Kim Jong Un

Minister of Foreign Affairs Acting
- In office 2007
- Premier: Kim Yong-il
- Supreme Leader: Kim Jong Il
- Preceded by: Paek Nam-sun
- Succeeded by: Pak Ui-chun

Personal details
- Born: August 29, 1939 Pyongwon, South Pyongan Province
- Died: May 20, 2016 (aged 76) Pyongyang, North Korea
- Party: Workers' Party of Korea
- Education: University of International Affairs
- Profession: diplomat

Kang Sok-ju (Korean: 강석주; Korean pronunciation: [kaŋ.sɔk̚.t͈su]; August 29, 1939 – May 20, 2016) was a North Korean diplomat and politician.

Having obtained a Bachelor's degree in French from the University of International Affairs in Pyongyang, Kang began a diplomatic career. His first significant position was as the Korean Workers' Party's deputy director for international affairs, and then director.

In 1980, he was appointed section leader of his bureau. In 1984, he joined the Ministry of Foreign Affairs, and in 1986 he became First Vice Foreign Minister, a position which he held until 2010.

In the 1990s, he was prominently involved in diplomatic talks with the United States over the issue of his country's nuclear programme. He negotiated the Agreed Framework with Assistant Secretary of State Robert Gallucci and former U.S. President Jimmy Carter in 1994. He was subsequently in charge of supervising North Korea's relations with the United States, which became his area of expertise. Reuters states that Kang "engineered the development of the North's nuclear programme that [...] has been the key source of regional security tensions".

KBS describes him as being "among a handful of well-known North Korean officials", who has "gained global attention", and adds: "Considered too aggressive at times, Kang sometimes caused problems with his pushy demeanor. In the early 1990s, he made several crucial decisions without consulting the party and was sent to a concentration camp for training in revolutionary discipline".

In September 2010, he was promoted to the position of Vice Premier of the North Korean Government, under Premier Choe Yong-rim. His specific assignment was to oversee foreign policy. Kim Kye-gwan replaced him as First Vice Foreign Minister.

BBC News described Kang as "a confidant of leader Kim Jong Il".

Kang died on May 20, 2016, from esophageal cancer. His funeral committee was chaired by Choe Ryong-hae and had 52 other members.

Political offices
| Preceded by Paek Nam-sun; Acting | Acting Minister of Foreign Affairs; 2007 | Succeeded by Pak Ui-chun |
