= Thae Byong-ryol =

North Korean general (1916–1986)

Personal details
- Born: 1916 Myeongcheon, North Hamgyong, North Korea
- Died: December 29, 1986 (aged 69–70)
- Citizenship: North Korean
- Party: Workers' Party of Korea
- Occupation: Military officer, politician

Military service
- Allegiance: North Korea
- Branch/service: Korean People's Army
- Rank: General

Thae Byong-ryol (Korean: 태병렬; 1916-December 29, 1986), General of the Korean People ’s Army (April 1992). In October 1980 elected by the First Plenary Session of the 6th Central Committee of the Workers' Party of Korea he was elected a member of the Central Military Commission. Thae Byong-ryol served as a member of the central Committee from October 14, 1980 until his death. He has at least one son named Thae Hyong-chol, who is the president of Kim Il Sung University.

== Biography ==
In 1936, 20-year-old Thae Byong-ryol participated in the anti-Japanese activities led by Kim Il Sung. In March 1970, he was awarded the title of Hero of the Republic and Order of the National Flag. He was elected as a member of the Central Military Commission of the Workers’ Party of Korea in 1980 and served there until his death. In October 1985, he served as the director of the Memorial Hall of the Victorious War Museum which commemorates the Day of Victory in the Great Fatherland Liberation War until he died on December 29, 1986. In April 1992, he was awarded the rank of General of the People's Army (Daejang).

== Awards and honors ==
A photo of Thae shows Thae wearing the ribbons to all decorations awarded to him.

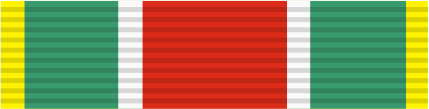
