= Paek Nam-sun =

North Korean diplomat (1929–2007)

- 백남순

Minister of Foreign Affairs
- In office September 1998 – 2 January 2007
- Supreme Leader: Kim Jong Il
- Preceded by: Kim Yong-nam
- Succeeded by: Kang Sok-ju (Acting)

Personal details
- Born: 13 March 1929
- Died: 2 January 2007 (aged 77)

- Paek Nam-sun
- Hangul: 백남순
- Hanja: 白南淳
- RR: Baek Namsun
- MR: Paek Namsun

Paek Nam-sun (Korean: 백남순; Korean pronunciation: [pɛŋ.nam.sun] or [pɛk̚] [nam.sun]; March 13, 1929 – January 2, 2007) was the North Korean Minister of Foreign Affairs from 1998 until his death. He was one of the few North Koreans to frequently be in the international spotlight.

== Early life ==
Paek was born in Kilju County, North Hamgyong Province.

== Education ==
Paek graduated from Kim Il Sung University in Pyongyang.

== Career ==
In 1968, Paek became vice director of the International Affairs Department of the Workers' Party of Korea. Paek participated in the first round of North-South Red Cross talks in 1972.

In 1974, Paek became the ambassador to Poland until 1979.

Paek also served on the Supreme People's Assembly from 1990 until the time of his death, having been elected to the 9th, 10th, and 11th sessions.

== Personal life ==
His third son Paek Ryong-Chon became the president of the Central Bank of the Democratic People's Republic of Korea in 2011.

=== Death ===
Paek died on 2 January 2007 in Pyongyang. North Korean state media attributed the death to an undefined illness although it was said that he suffered from kidney disease. He was the only North Korean foreign minister to have met his American counterpart.

Paek was ill for some time prior to his death and the role was filled by one of his deputies, most notably Kim Kye-gwan.

== See also ==
- Politics of North Korea

== References and notes ==
- Yonhap News Agency. "Who's who, North Korea," pp. 787–812 in Yonhap News Agency (2004). Korea Annual 2004. Seoul: Author. ISBN 89-7433-070-9.
- PAEK, Nam-sun International Who's Who. accessed September 1, 2006.
- North Korea's foreign minister dies, Al-Jazeera English, accessed January 3, 2007

Political offices
Preceded by Kim Yong-nam	Minister of Foreign Affairs; 1998–2007	Succeeded by Kang Sok-ju; Acting
