= Pak Ui-chun =

North Korean diplomat and politician

- 박의춘
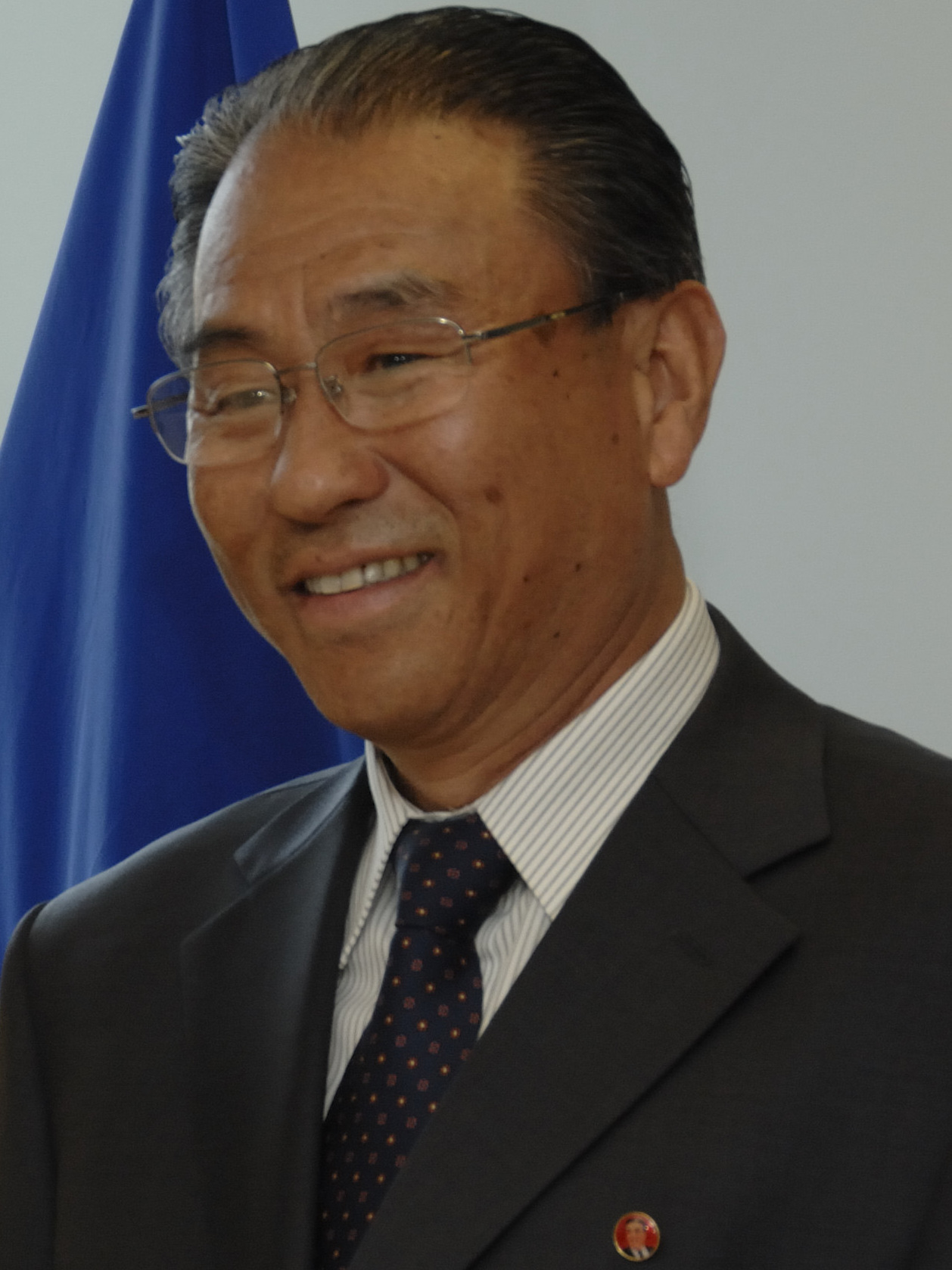
- Pak in 2008

Minister of Foreign Affairs
- In office 18 May 2007 – 9 April 2014
- Chairman: Kim Jong-il; Kim Jong-un
- Premier: Pak Pong-ju; Choe Yong-rim; Kim Yong-il
- Preceded by: Kang Sok-ju (Acting)
- Succeeded by: Ri Su-yong

Personal details
- Born: 15 August 1932 (age 93) South Hamgyong Province, North Korea

Korean name
- Hangul: 박의춘
- Hanja: 朴義春
- RR: Bak Uichun
- MR: Pak Ŭich'un

Pak Ui-chun (Korean: 박의춘; pronounced [pa.ɡi.tsʰun] or [pak̚] [ɰi.tsʰun]; born 15 August 1932) is a North Korean diplomat and politician. He was the minister for foreign affairs of the Democratic People's Republic of Korea and was replaced by Ri Su-yong following the 2014 North Korean parliamentary election.

Pak began his diplomatic career in 1972, and went on to serve as ambassador of North Korea to Algeria, Syria and Lebanon. From 1989 to 2007, he served as ambassador to Russia, before being appointed Foreign Affairs Minister upon the death in office of his predecessor Paek Nam-sun.

== See also ==
- Mun Jong-nam

Political offices
Preceded by Kang Sok-ju; Acting	Minister of Foreign Affairs; 2007–2014	Succeeded by Ri Su-yong
