= Ri Chol =

North Korean politician

- Hangul: 리철
- Hanja: 李撤
- RR: Ri Cheol
- MR: Ri Ch'ŏl

Ri Chol (리철) is a North Korean politician. He is a member of the 14th Presidium of the Supreme People's Assembly.

== Biography ==
Born in 1940, he graduated from the College of International Studies and the French Department of International Relations. From 1973 to 1979, he served as Director of Foreign Affairs and Literature of the International Organization, and was appointed to the General Affairs of Geneva, Switzerland in June 1980 after passing through the secretary of the secretary's office of the Party's organizational leadership in 1980. In September 1987, after serving as ambassador of the Geneva delegation in Switzerland, he became the permanent representative of the UN secretariat of Geneva in 1991 and was appointed ambassador to Switzerland in January 1998. In July 2000, KOHAS, a joint venture company, served as ambassador to Liechtenstein in August 2001, and as ambassador to the Netherlands in December 2001. In March 2010 he resigned from the ambassadorship in Switzerland. In September 2010, he was elected as a candidate for the Central Committee of the Workers' Party of Korea. Since April 2010, he has been the Director of the Joint Investment Guidance Bureau and the Chairman of the Joint Investment Commission. He was removed from those positions In November 2011.

== See also ==
- Politics of North Korea
