= Pyon Yong-rip =

North Korean politician (1929–2016)

Secretary of the standing committee of the Supreme People's Assembly
- In office 2009–2012
- Supreme Leader: Kim Jong Un
- Preceded by: Choe Yong-rim
- Succeeded by: Thae Hyong-chol

Personal details
- Born: 20 September 1929 Chaeryong County, Kōkai-dō, Korea, Empire of Japan
- Died: 15 November 2016 (aged 87)
- Citizenship: North Korean
- Party: Workers' Party of Korea
- Education: Kim Il Sung University

Pyon Yong-rip (Korean: 변영립; September 20, 1929 – November 15, 2016) was a politician of North Korea. He served as secretary of the standing committee of the Supreme People's Assembly and was a member of the 6th Political Bureau of the 6th Central Committee of the Workers' Party of Korea.

== Biography ==
Pyon was born in 1929, in Chaeryong County, Kōkai-dō, Korea, Empire of Japan. He spent his early childhood in Haeju and Daedong, South Pyongan Province. He joined the Korean People's Army on September 2, 1950. He earned a Bachelor of Science degree in Physics at Kim Il Sung University. On February 29, 1968, he was promoted as the Lieutenant of the Ground Forces of the Korean People's Army, and served as Deputy Director of the Department of Education, Kim Il Sung University, Deputy Minister of Higher Education, Deputy Director of the Ministry of Education, Vice President of the National Academy of Sciences, North Korea's Ministry of Education and Director of the National Academy of Sciences. Since July 2009, he has served as secretary of the Standing Committee of the Supreme People's Assembly until 2012 when he was replaced by Thae Hyong-chol. At the representative meeting of the Workers' Party of Korea in September 2010, he was elected a member of the Political Bureau of the Central Committee of the Workers' Party of Korea.
