= National Reunification Prize =

- Awarded for: Contributions to the reunification of Korea
- Country: North Korea
- Presented by: Presidium of the Supreme People's Assembly
- First award: 1990
- Website: http://www.uriminzokkiri.com/index.php?ptype=commonsense&no=67514

- National Reunification Prize
- Chosŏn'gŭl: 조국통일상
- Hancha: 祖國統一賞
- Revised Romanization: Joguk Tongil Sang
- McCune–Reischauer: Choguk T'ongil Sang

The National Reunification Prize (Korean: 조국통일상) is an award of North Korea, bestowed by the Presidium of the Supreme People's Assembly upon people who have contributed to the reunification of Korea. The award was instituted in 1990.

== Recipients ==
=== 1990 ===
- An Ji-saeng
- An U-saeng
- Moon Ik-hwan
- Yun I-sang

=== 1995 ===
- Ryu Mi-yong

=== 1998 ===
- Kim Chaek
- Kang Ryang-uk
- Ho Jong-suk
- Kim Jong-thae
- Choe Yong-do
- Hong Myong-hui
- Ho Hon
- Kim Ku
- Kim Kyu-sik
- Rim Su-gyong
- Kim Ki-hyon
- Jo Nam-jin
- Ryo Yon-gu
- Phyo Mu-won

=== 1999 ===
- Kim Pyong-sik
- O Ik-je

=== 2000 ===
- The 63 unconverted long-term prisoners repatriated in 2000.

=== 2005 ===
- Kim Yong-sun
- Kang Ung-jin
- Son Song-phil
- Ju Chang-jun
- Ryo Won-gu
- Song Ho-gyong
- Nam Sung-u
- Ho Nam-gi
- Yang In-won
- Cha Sang-bo
- Sok Myong-son

=== 2007 ===
- Rim Tong-ok
- Han Ung-sik
- Pak Ryol
- Yun Song-sik
- Jong In-sok
- Ri U-song
- Jong In-bo
- Jang Pyong-thae
- Kim Jong-sik
- Yun Kum-sok
- An Hung-gap
- Han Hak-su
- Ri Jung-rak
- Kim Yong-sul

=== 2012 ===
- Kim Jung-rin
- Moon Sun-myung

=== 2016 ===
- Kim Yang-gon
- Kang Kwan ju
- Ri Jun song
- Kim Ryu hwan
- Kim Yong Kwan
- Ri Jong man
- Jong Jin hwan
- Ho Hong sik
- Ri u kap
- Jung gyu Jin
- Chae Chang guk

== See also ==
- Korean reunification
- Orders and medals of North Korea
