= Cindy Yu =

British-Chinese journalist

- Born: Yu Xiaodan; Nanjing, China
- Education: University of Oxford
- Occupation: Journalist
- Employer: The Times

Chinese name
- Chinese: 俞小丹
Transcriptions
Standard Mandarin
- Hanyu Pinyin: Yú Xiǎodān
- IPA: [y̌ ɕjàʊ.tán]

Nanjingese name
- Nanjingese: Yú Siǎotàn
- IPA: [y˧˩ ɕjɔ˨˩˨.tã˧˩]

Cindy Yu (Chinese: 俞小丹; pinyin: Yú Xiǎodān) is a British-Chinese journalist. She is contributing editor and a columnist at The Times.

== Early life ==
Yu was born in Nanjing, China and lived there until she was 10 years old at which point she moved to the United Kingdom.

She went on to study philosophy, politics and economics at the University of Oxford before studying for a master's degree in contemporary Chinese studies.

== Career ==
Yu worked as a Lidl store manager before starting an internship at The Spectator. Following this, she gained employment with the magazine.

As the broadcast editor at The Spectator, Yu managed the audio and video output from the magazine. She began recording her own fortnightly podcast called Chinese Whispers in July 2020 about Chinese politics, society, and culture, in which she often interviewed fellow China watchers.

Yu joined The Times in May 2025 as a columnist and contributing editor.

She is also a frequent commentator on issues related to China at the BBC World Service, RTÉ, and Sky News.
