= Kim Kye-gwan =

North Korean diplomat (born 1943)

First Vice Minister of Foreign Affairs
- In office September 2010 – April 2019
- Leader: Kim Jong Il; Kim Jong Un
- Preceded by: Kang Sok-ju
- Succeeded by: Choe Son-hui

Personal details
- Born: 6 July 1943 (age 83) Unsan County, North Pyongan Province
- Party: WPK

- Kim Kye-gwan
- Hangul: 김계관
- Hanja: 金桂官
- RR: Gim Gyegwan
- MR: Kim Kyegwan

Kim Kye-gwan (Korean: 김계관; pronounced [kim.ɡje.ɡwan] (Note: The given name Kye-gwan is pronounced [kje.ɡwan] in isolation.); born July 6, 1943) is a North Korean diplomat. His official position was First Vice Minister of the Ministry of Foreign Affairs, to which he was promoted (from just Vice Minister) immediately before the Korean Workers' Party Conference of 28 September 2010. He is the leading figure in international talks over the country's nuclear weapons program, including the six-party talks in Beijing.

== Career ==
In February 2007, North Korea agreed, with the help of Kim Kye Gwan, to disarm their nuclear program. This involved shutting down its nuclear reactor and eventually dismantling its atomic weapons program, just four months after testing a nuclear bomb. Kim Kye Gwan is North Korea's leading spokesperson and head negotiator in matters concerning the North's nuclear ambitions, and will most likely enter the limelight for his role in facilitating North Korea's Nuclear Disarmament deal struck in February.

Kim met with Christopher R. Hill, the U.S. assistant secretary of state, when Hill visited Pyongyang in June 2007, afterwards announcing that North Korea would promptly shut down its Yongbyon nuclear facility.

He was also present at the airport to greet Bill Clinton on his arrival in North Korea for a visit in August 2009 concerning the release of two American journalists imprisoned by North Korea.

He was also present at the airport to greet Jimmy Carter on his arrival in North Korea for a visit in August 2010 concerning the release of an American teacher imprisoned by North Korea.

Kim was appointed First Vice Minister of Foreign Affairs in September 2010, replacing Kang Sok-ju.

In December 2010, Kim invited the serving governor of the U.S. State of New Mexico, Bill Richardson, to North Korea in an unofficial capacity. He met Richardson upon his arrival in Pyongyang on December 16, where Richardson told reporters that his "objective is to see if we can reduce the tension on the Korean peninsula, that is my objective. I am going to have a whole series of talks with North Korean officials here and I look forward to my discussions", he said.

In July 2011, he traveled to New York City in order to meet with U.S. officials in the Department of State, to encourage recent moves toward possible peace talks. Private food aid shipments (of flour, meant for starving North Korean children) through the Demilitarized Zone have begun again, though South Korea will likely not resume official, government-based food aid shipments — or de-nuclearization and peace talks — until North Korea shows some sign of apologizing for the sinking of the Cheonan and its most recent nuclear test. So far, North Korea — which is still under sanctions for pursuing nuclear weapons (it was regarded as a state sponsor of terrorism and was one of three countries in President George W. Bush's so-called "Axis of Evil" with Iraq and Iran) — has refused to do so. These incidents, and others, have together drastically raised tensions between the two countries within the last two years since talks broke down in 2009 (the North and South are technically still in a state of war, having only signed a truce, and not a formal peace treaty). However, additional motives to sign a deal are the ongoing and worsening food shortages, as well as the upcoming centennial of the birth of North Korea's founder and "Great Leader", Kim Il Sung, the father of the second leader, Kim Jong Il.

In May 2018, he was involved with the discussion about nuclear disarmament.

== See also ==
- Politics of North Korea

== Notes ==
Political offices
Preceded by Kang Sok-ju	First Vice Minister of Foreign Affairs; 2010–2019	Succeeded by Choe Son-hui
