= Ji Dong-sik =

South Korean theologian (1910–1977)

Ji Dong-sik (Korean: 지동식; Hanja: 池東植; 1910–1977) was a Korean Evangelical pastor and theologian.

== Career ==
Ji Dong-sik was professor at the College of Theology, Yonhee University from 1947, chairman of the Christian Korean Gospel Church (1962), president of the Korean Theological Society(1966), president of the National Council of Churches in Korea (1970).

In 1961, he translated and published The Gospel of Matthew.

DBpia gives a list of 36 published articles.

In 2007, a 30th Anniversary meeting was organized by the Yonsei University Theological College Alumni Association while a collected works edition was published in 2012.

== Sources ==
- AKorStud: "지동식 (池東植)" [Ji Dongsik]. Academy of Korean Studies (in Korean).
- DBpia: "지동식" [Ji Dongsik]. DBpia (in Korean).
- EncyKor: "지동식 (池東植)" [Ji Dongsik]. Encyclopedia of Korean Culture (in Korean).
- Yonsei: 연세대학교 신과대학 동창회 [Yonsei University Theological College Alumni Association], ed. (2007). 지동식 박사 소 천 30주기 기념논문집 [Humility, Humilitas, Bomsam Dr. Ji Dong-sik's 30th Anniversary Commemorative Papers] (in Korean). Seoul: 한우리 [Hanwoori]. p. 307. ISBN 9788992569026.
- Ji Dongsik 지동식 (池東植) (2012). Christian Korean Gospel Church Theological Committee (ed.). (기독교대한복음교회의 목회자) 지동식의 신학과 사상 [(Pastor of the Christian Korean Gospel Church) Ji Dong-shik's Theology and Thought] (in Korean). Seoul: Dongyeon. ISBN 9788964471647.
