= Ryo Yon-gu =

North Korean politician

- 려연구
- Born: August 29, 1927; Shanghai (Republic of China)
- Died: September 28, 1996 (aged 69)
- Resting place: Patriotic Martyrs' Cemetery
- Alma mater: Moscow State University; Ewha Womans University
- Occupation: Politician
- Employer: Pyongyang University of Foreign Studies
- Parent(s): Lyuh Woon-hyung
- Relatives: Ryo Won-gu
- Awards: Order of Kim Il Sung; National Reunification Prize

Ryo Yon-gu (Korean: 려연구; August 29, 1927 – September 28, 1996) was a North Korean politician.

Ryo Yon-gu was born on August 29, 1927, in Shanghai, China, the daughter of Korean independence activist Lyuh Woon-hyung. She is the older sister of politician Ryo Won-gu. Following Korean independence from Japan, she attended Ewha Womans University in Seoul, but dropped out and moved to Pyongyang like her father and sister. She studied railway engineering at Moscow State University and became a professor at the Pyongyang University of Foreign Studies.

Ryo Yon-gu entered public life in 1979 in a leadership role in the Democratic Front for the Reunification of Korea. She was elected to the 7th Supreme People's Assembly in 1982. The following year, she became a vice chairman of the Presidium, a post she held for the rest of her life. She was a member of the central committee of the Socialist Women's Union of Korea and an alternate member of the Central Committee of the Korean Workers’ Party.

In 1991, she headed the North Korean delegation to the Second Conference on Asia's Peace and Women's Role in Seoul. While there, she laid a wreath given to her by President Kim Il Sung on the graves of her parents.

Ryo Yon-gu died on 28 September 1996.
