= Pak In-chol =

North Korean politician

- 박인철
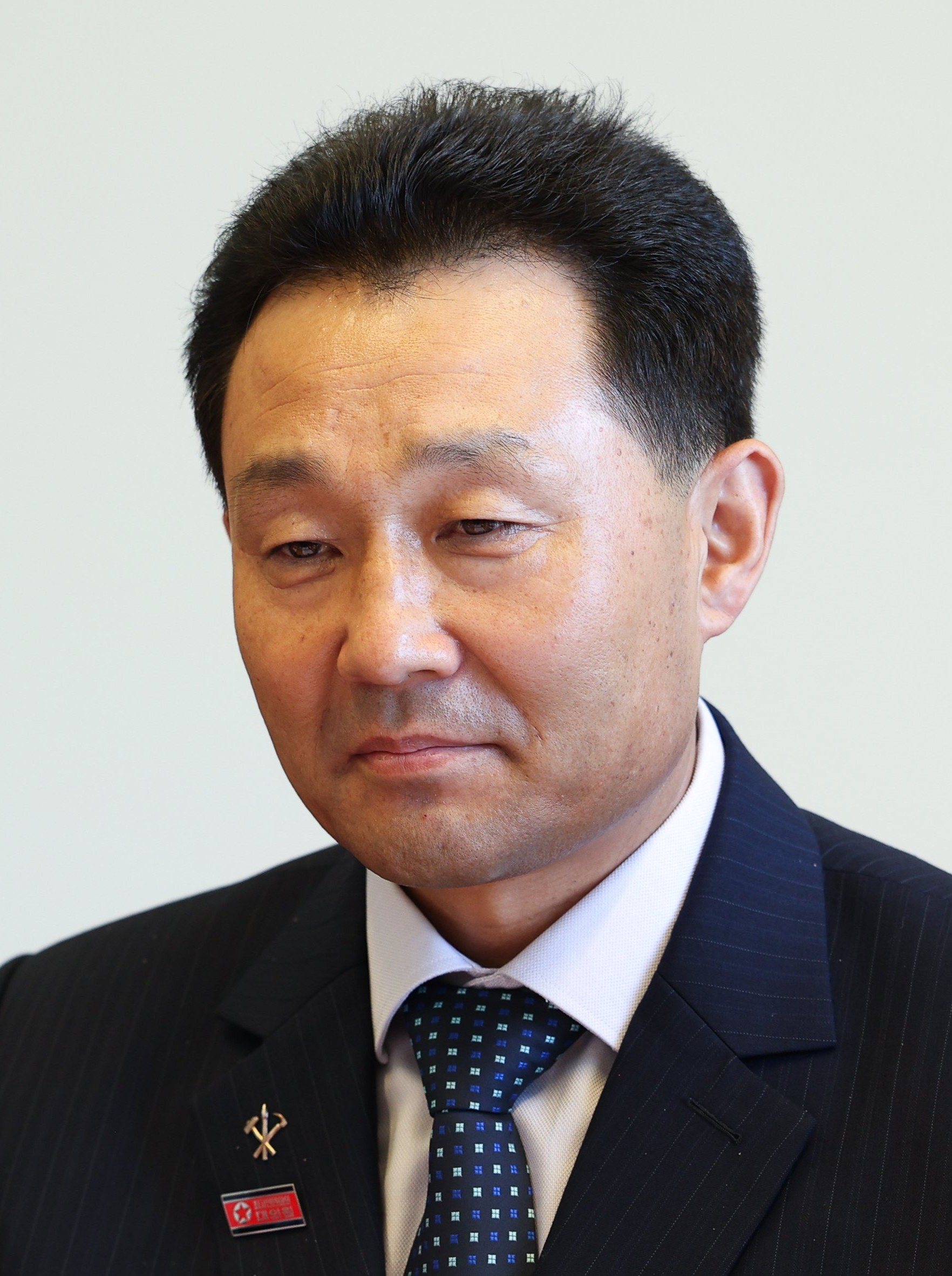
- Pak in 2025

Chairman of the Supreme People's Assembly
- In office 19 January 2023 – 20 September 2025
- Leader: Kim Jong Un
- SC Chairman: Choe Ryong-hae
- Preceded by: Pak Thae-song
- Succeeded by: Jo Yong-won

Personal details
- Born: North Korea
- Party: Workers' Party of Korea

Korean name
- Hangul: 박인철
- RR: Bak Incheol
- MR: Pak Inch'ŏl

Pak In-chol (Korean: 박인철) is a North Korean politician who served from 19 January 2023 to 20 September 2025 as the Chairman of the Supreme People's Assembly, North Korea's unicameral parliament.

== Biography ==
In January 2021, at the 8th Party Congress, he was elected as a candidate member of the 8th Central Committee. He also served as chairman of the General Federation of Trade Unions of Korea. At the 8th session of the 14th Supreme People's Assembly in January 2023, he was elected as the Chairman of the Supreme People's Assembly.

Political offices
Preceded by Pak Thae-song	Chairman of the Supreme People's Assembly; January 2023 - 20 September 2025	Succeeded by Vacant
