= Ryo Won-gu =

North Korean politician (1928–2009)

- 려원구
- Born: November 1928; Keijō, Korea, Empire of Japan
- Died: July 2009 (age 81)
- Occupations: Chair of the Democratic Front for the Reunification of Korea and vice chair of the Supreme People's Assembly in North Korea

Ryo Won-gu (Korean: 려원구; November 1928 – July 2009) was a North Korean politician. She is best known for her work on inter-Korean diplomacy during her time as chair of the Democratic Front for the Reunification of Korea and vice chair of the Supreme People's Assembly.

== Early life and education ==
Ryo Won-gu was born in 1928 in Keijō, Korea, Empire of Japan. She was the third daughter of the politician Lyuh Woon-hyung, a Korean reunification activist and politician who was assassinated in 1947. Before her father's assassination, in July 1946, Ryo Won-gu and her older sister Ryo Yon-gu had defected to North Korea and moved to Pyongyang.

Then, from 1946 to 1954, Ryo lived in Moscow, where she was a student at Moscow State University.

== Career ==
For a period beginning in 1989, Ryo taught at Pyongyang's Kim Chaek University of Technology. Then, beginning in 1991, she served as vice chairman of North Korea's Education Committee, an equivalent to the deputy secretary of education or vice education minister in some other countries.

From 1998 to 2009, Ryo served as a vice chairperson of the 10th and 11th Supreme People's Assemblies. Also beginning in 1998, she became co-chairwoman of the Democratic Front for the Reunification of Korea. She also served as a delegate to the Presidium of the Supreme People's Assembly. In her work, she often followed in her sister Ryo Yong-gu's footsteps, succeeding her in her roles in both the Supreme People Assembly and the Democratic Front for the Reunification of Korea after Ryo Yong-gu's death in 1996.

Ryo Won-gu was heavily involved in diplomatic efforts between North and South Korea, especially after her sister's death, and was considered an expert on the subject of South Korean relations. In 2000, she helped host South Korean President Kim Dae-jung during that year's inter-Korean summit. Then, in 2002, she drew notice by visiting Seoul on Liberation Day, paying a visit to her father's grave in the city during her trip.

In 2005, Ryo was awarded the National Reunification Prize by the Presidium of the Supreme People's Assembly. In 2007, she was named a recipient of the Order of Kim Il Sung, North Korea's highest order. She died in 2009 at the age of 81.
