= East Asia (journal) =

Academic journal

- Discipline: East Asian studies
- Language: English
- Edited by: Gordon C. K. Cheung

Publication details
- Former name: Journal of Northeast Asian Studies
- History: 1982–present
- Publisher: Springer Nature (Netherlands)
- Frequency: Quarterly
- Open access: Hybrid
- Impact factor: 1.1 (2024)

Standard abbreviations
- ISO 4: East Asia

Indexing
- ISSN: 1096-6838 (print); 1874-6284 (web)
- LCCN: 99103462

Links
- Journal homepage; Online archive

East Asia: An International Quarterly is a peer‑reviewed academic journal covering political, economic, and cultural developments in Greater China, Japan, the two Koreas, and the wider Pacific Rim. It was established in 1982 as the Journal of Northeast Asian Studies and adopted its current name in 1997. The journal is published by Springer Nature and the editor‑in‑chief is Gordon C. K. Cheung (Durham University).

== Scope ==
The journal adopts a transnational perspective on the interplay between politics and culture in East Asia. Regular articles, special issues and thematic symposia analyse topics such as regional security, economic integration, soft‑power competition and cultural exchange.

== Abstracting and indexing ==
- EBSCO databases
- Emerging Sources Citation Index (Web of Science)
- GEOBASE
- ProQuest databases
- Scopus

== Impact factor ==
According to the Journal Citation Reports, the journal has a 2024 impact factor of 1.1.

== See also ==
- Asian studies
- List of International Relations Journals
