= Thae Hyong-chol =

North Korean politician

Vice Chairman of the Standing Committee of the Supreme People's Assembly
- Incumbent
- Assumed office 11 April 2019 Serving with Kim Yong-dae
- Chairman: Choe Ryong-hae

Personal details
- Born: 1953 (age 72–73) Pyongyang, North Korea
- Party: Workers' Party of Korea
- Education: Kim Il Sung University

Korean name
- Hangul: 태형철
- Hanja: 太炯哲
- RR: Tae Hyeongcheol
- MR: T'ae Hyŏngch'ŏl

Thae Hyong-chol (Korean: 태형철; born 1953) is a North Korean politician and university professor. He was President of the Academy of Social Sciences and an alternate for the 8th Political Bureau (and 7th Politburo member). Since the 12th convocation of the Supreme People's Assembly he is serving as Vice Chairman of the Standing Committee. He previously served as President of Kim Il Sung University from 2013 to 2019, and was the Minister of Higher Education in the Cabinet of North Korea. He is the son of a North Korean general, Thae Byong-ryol.

== Biography ==
Born in 1953 in Pyongyang to Thae Byong-ryol, he graduated from Kim Il Sung University. He started as a researcher at the Institute of Social Sciences in 1977 and was head of the World Economic and South-South Cooperation Research Institute at the Academy of Social Sciences in October 1990 and served as vice president of the Institute of Social Sciences in March 1995. Since August 1997, he has been serving as president of the Social Sciences Institute. In September 2010, he was elected a candidate for the Central Committee of the Workers' Party of Korea. On April 13, 2012, the 12th 5th session of the Supreme People's Assembly he was elected as the General Secretary of the Presidium of the Supreme People's Assembly replacing Kang Chang-uk. In 2014 he was replaced by Hong Son-ok. In April 2013, he became the President of Kim Il Sung University and became the Minister of Higher Education, succeeding Song Ja-reeb. He was elected as the 10th convocation of the Supreme People's Assembly in September 1998 and the 11th convocation and Presidium of the Supreme People's Assembly in September 2003.
