= Yang Hyong-sop =

North Korean politician (1925–2022)

- 양형섭

Vice President of the Presidium of the Supreme People's Assembly
- In office 5 September 1998 – 11 April 2019 Serving with Kim Yong-dae
- President: Kim Yong-nam

Chairman of the Standing Committee of the Supreme People's Assembly
- In office 7 April 1983 – 5 September 1998
- Preceded by: Hwang Jang-yop
- Succeeded by: Kim Yong-nam

Personal details
- Born: 1 October 1925 Hamhung, Kankyōnan-dō, Korea, Empire of Japan
- Died: 13 May 2022 (aged 96) Pyongyang, North Korea
- Party: Workers' Party of Korea

Korean name
- Hangul: 양형섭
- Hanja: 楊亨燮
- RR: Yang Hyeongseop
- MR: Yang Hyŏngsŏp

Yang Hyong-sop (Korean: 양형섭; 1 October 1925 – 13 May 2022) was a North Korean politician who served as Chairman of the Standing Committee of the Supreme People's Assembly and Chairman of the Supreme People's Assembly from 1983 to 1998 (from 1994 it was formally the highest position in the state). He subsequently served as Vice President of the Presidium of the SPA from 1998 to 2019.

== Life and career ==
Yang was born on 1 October 1925, in Hamhung, Kankyōnan-dō, Korea, Empire of Japan. He attended Moscow State University and Kim Il Sung University, and was married to Kim Shin-sook, a cousin of Kim Il Sung. According to the official biography released by the Korean Central News Agency, he joined the Korean People's Army in June 1950 (approximately when the Korean War started); after graduating from Kim Il Sung University, he served as section chief and then secretary of the Central Committee of the Workers' Party of Korea, Director of the Central Party School, Minister of Higher Education, and President of the Academy of Social Sciences. He was elected Chairman of the Standing Committee of the Supreme People's Assembly in 1983, after having been a vice-chairman since 1962; in this capacity, he assumed the functions of de facto head of state after Kim Il Sung's death in 1994, as the post of President of the Republic was never reassigned; however, actual power was held by Kim Jong Il. In 1998 a new Constitution passed the President's powers to the President of the Presidium; in the same year, Yang was replaced by Kim Yong-nam in that capacity, but continued to serve as vice-president again. He was also a member of the Politburo of the Workers' Party. On 6 January 2007, at a mass rally in Pyongyang, he gave a speech praising the North Korean government for building nuclear weapons. Yang Hyong-sop died of a stroke on 13 May 2022, at the age of 96.

== Career accomplishments ==
- October 1961: Appointed President of the Central Committee Party School (DPRK Workers' Party)
- October 1962: Elected Supreme People's Assembly Vice-chairman for 2nd–12th Assemblies of SPA.
- November 1979: Appointed Chairman of the Democratic Front for the Reunification of the Fatherland
- June 1980: Appointed Chairman of the Academy of Social Sciences

Political offices
| Preceded by Hwang Jang-yop | Chairman of the Standing Committee of the Supreme People's Assembly; 1983–1998 | Succeeded by Kim Yong-nam as President of the SPA Presidium |
| Preceded by Kim Il Sung as President of North Korea | Head of State of North Korea de facto as Chairman of the SPA Standing Committee; 1994–1998 | Succeeded by Kim Yong-nam as President of the SPA Presidium |
