= Kim Yong-nam =

North Korean politician (1928–2025)

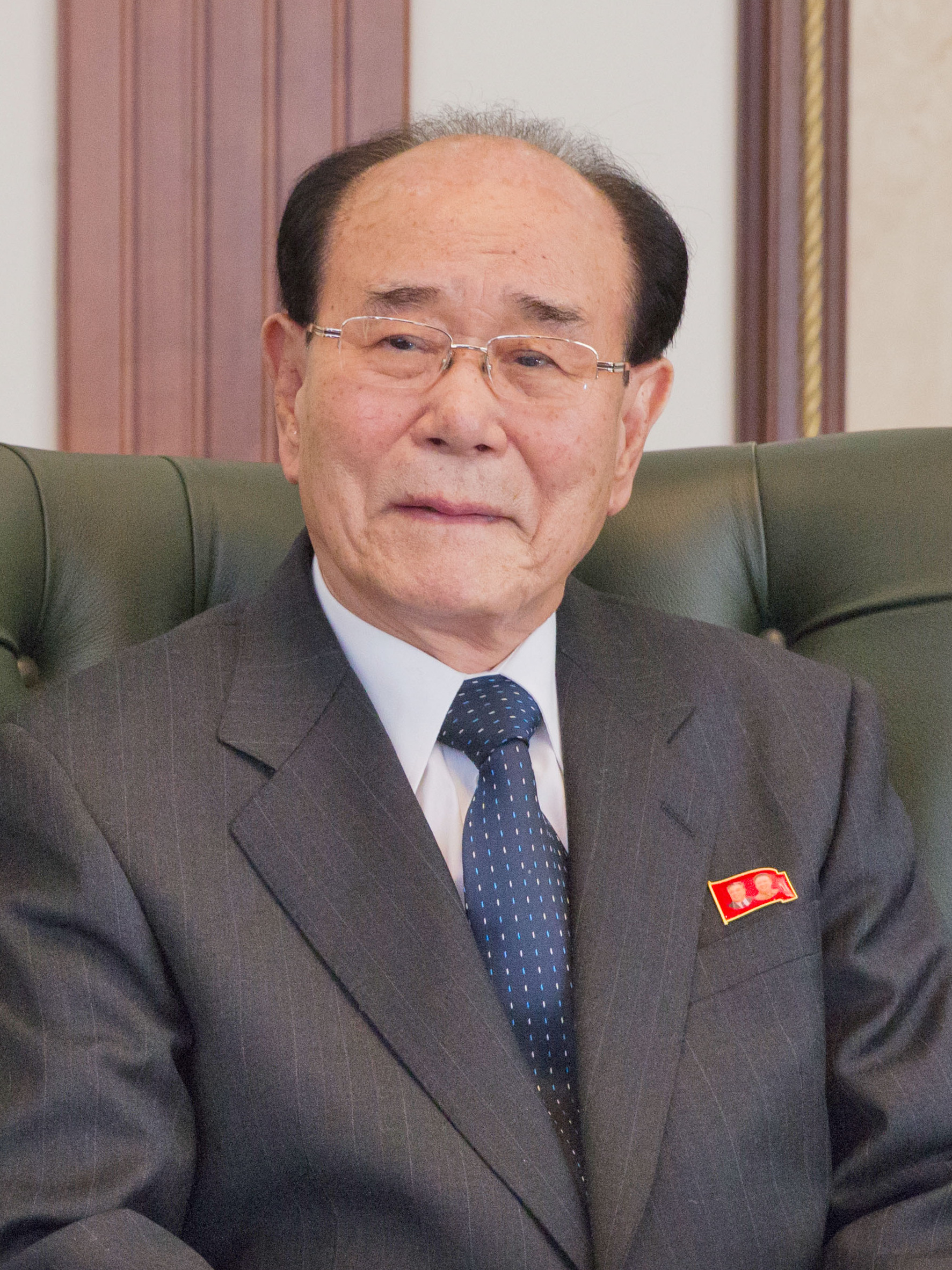
- Kim in 2014

President of the Presidium of the Supreme People's Assembly
- In office September 5, 1998 – April 11, 2019
- Leader: Kim Jong Il; Kim Jong Un
- Preceded by: Yang Hyong-sop
- Succeeded by: Choe Ryong-hae

Minister of Foreign Affairs
- In office December 1, 1983 – September 5, 1998
- Premier: Hong Song-nam; Kang Song-san; Yon Hyong-muk; Ri Kun-mo; Kang Song-san; Ri Jong-ok
- Preceded by: Ho Dam
- Succeeded by: Paek Nam-sun

Personal details
- Born: Kim Myong-sam; February 4, 1928 Heijō, then in Korea under Japanese rule
- Died: November 3, 2025 (aged 97) Pyongyang, North Korea
- Party: Workers' Party of Korea
- Education: Tomsk State University; Rostov State University

Korean name
- Hangul: 김영남
- Hanja: 金永南
- RR: Gim Yeongnam
- MR: Kim Yŏngnam

Kim Yong-nam (Korean: 김영남; February 4, 1928 – November 3, 2025) was a North Korean politician who served as the president of the Presidium of the Supreme People's Assembly of North Korea, from 1998 until 2019. Due to holding the office, he was considered the head of state of North Korea; the country's constitution was amended once he left office in 2019 to transfer this position to the president of the State Affairs Commission, Kim Jong Un. Previously, he had served as minister of foreign affairs from 1983 to 1998. He was elected a member of the Presidium of the Workers' Party of Korea (WPK) in 2010.

== Life and career ==
Accounts of Kim's early life vary. According to Fyodor Tertitskiy of NK News, he was born Kim Myong-sam to a Korean-Chinese family in the village of Dapu Shihe in Manchuria, in what is now the Liaoning province of China, on February 4, 1928. Kim's official biography states that he was born in Pyongyang, Korea, Empire of Japan (now North Korea). According to North Korean state media, his family resisted Japanese occupation. His family came from the Jeonju Kim clan, making him a very distant relative of the Kim family. He came to North Korea with the Chinese People's Volunteer Army during the Korean War and chose to stay. Shortly before the end of the war in 1953, he went to the USSR to study. His experience with the Soviet Union (including many years of study at Russian universities) and China propelled his career in foreign affairs.

In 1956, he became a section chief at the Foreign Department of the Central Committee of the Workers' Party of Korea and was a vice minister for foreign affairs by 1962. In 1972, he became the chairman of the WPK Central Committee’s Foreign Department and a deputy to the Supreme People's Assembly. In June 1974, he became an alternate member of the WPK Politburo, becoming a full member by 1978, and a party secretary by 1980. According to declassified Soviet documents from this period, Kim was "sociable and cheerful, but he is quick-tempered and can sometimes lack self-restraint".

After graduating from university, he worked as a teacher at the Central Party School, vice-department director of the WPK Central Committee, vice-minister of foreign affairs, and first vice-department director, department director and secretary of the WPK Central Committee, vice premier of the administration council and concurrently Minister of Foreign Affairs. His elevation to Minister of Foreign Affairs is believed to have occurred as part of a reorganization of the diplomatic bureaucracy after the Rangoon bombing in October 1983. In 1988, he was responsible for the arrangement of unofficial diplomatic contacts with the United States through their respective embassies in Beijing.

=== President of the Presidium ===
On 5 September 1998, Kim was appointed as the President of the Presidium of the Supreme People's Assembly. As president of the Presidium, Kim Yong-nam was sometimes called the "nominal head of state" of North Korea. The President of the Presidium is sometimes considered the "number two official". The journalist and academic Don Oberdorfer described Kim as enigmatic, rigid in his official role, personally pleasant, highly intelligent, and an important figure behind the scenes in Pyongyang. He was assessed as having high-level political and diplomatic skills. According to South Korean politician Pak Jie-won, North Korean leader Kim Jong Il referred to Kim Yong-nam as the "Respected Chairman of the Presidium" (상임위원장님), a level of deference almost never extended to other subordinates.

==== Diplomatic activity ====
Kim visited Mongolia, Russia, Algeria, Egypt, Ethiopia, and Singapore in 2007. On March 18, 2008, he embarked on a goodwill tour of four African states. Arriving in Namibia on March 20, he was present for the official completion of a new presidential residence that was built by North Korea. He also held talks with Namibian President Hifikepunye Pohamba and signed an agreement on public health cooperation with Pohamba. He subsequently visited Angola, where he met President José Eduardo dos Santos on March 24, the Democratic Republic of the Congo, where he met President Joseph Kabila on March 26, and Uganda, where he met President Yoweri Museveni on March 29. He returned to North Korea on April 1.

Kim also attended the 2008 Summer Olympics opening ceremony on August 8, 2008, 2014 Winter Olympics opening ceremony on February 7, 2014, 2018 Winter Olympics opening ceremony on February 9, 2018, and the 2018 FIFA World Cup opening ceremony on June 14, 2018. On July 14, 2009, Kim met Vietnamese president Nguyen Minh Triet on the sidelines of the 15th Non-Aligned Movement Summit in Egypt. Kim represented North Korea at the 2015 Victory Day parade in Moscow on May 9, 2015, commemorating the 70th anniversary of the defeat of Nazi Germany in World War II. He attended the May 19, 2016 presidential inauguration of Equatoguinean president Teodoro Obiang Nguema Mbasogo. As representative of North Korea, he attended the investiture ceremony of Andrés Manuel López Obrador as president of Mexico on December 1, 2018.

=== Retirement and death ===
Kim retired on April 11, 2019, in a government reshuffle, aged 91, after almost 21 years as President of the SPA Presidium and almost 41 years as Party Politburo member (having first been elected to the body in August 1978). During the 2022 celebration of the Day of the Foundation of the Republic, he participated in the central concert and banquet which took place in the yard of the Mansudae Assembly Hall. In 2024, he attended a ceremony marking the 30th anniversary of Kim Il Sung’s death.

According to Korean Central News Agency, Kim had been receiving treatment for colon cancer in his hospital bed since June 2024. He died from multiple organ failures on November 3, 2025, at the age of 97. KCNA also reported North Korean leader Kim Jong Un visited the bier of Kim Yong-nam at the Sojang Funeral Hall to express deep condolences over his death. He was buried at the Patriotic Martyrs' Cemetery in Pyongyang, following a state funeral on November 5.

== List of international trips ==
As President of the Presidium of the Supreme People's Assembly, Kim Yong Nam conducted numerous foreign visits to represent the Democratic People's Republic of Korea.

Date	Country	Location	Purpose of Visit	Notes
3–7 June 1999	China	Beijing; Hangzhou; Shanghai	Official goodwill visit	At the invitation of the Standing Committee of the National People's Congress and the State Council.
7–21 April 1999	Cuba	Havana	Official visit	Participated in the south summit and met with Cuban leader Fidel Castro.
11–14 July 2001	Vietnam	Hanoi	Official goodwill visit	Met with Vietnamese President Tran Duc Luong.
15–17 July 2001	Laos	Vientiane	Official goodwill visit	Met with Laotian President Khamtay Siphandone.
17–20 July 2001	Cambodia	Phnom Penh	Official goodwill visit	Met with King Norodom Sihanouk.
28 February–3 March 2002	Thailand	Bangkok	Official visit	
4–6 March 2002	Malaysia	Kuala Lumpur	Official visit	
10–12 July 2002	Indonesia	Jakarta	Official visit	Met with President Megawati Sukarnoputri to strengthen bilateral ties.
13–16 July 2002	Libya	Tarabulus	Official visit	
17–19 July 2002	Syria	Damascus	Official visit	
19–21 October 2004	China	Beijing; Tianjin	Official visit	
April 2005	Indonesia	Bandung	Asian-African Summit	Attended the 50th anniversary of the Bandung Conference.
20–23 July 2007	Mongolia	Ulaanbaatar	Official visit	Part of a multi-nation tour including Russia and several African nations.
July 2007	Russia	Moscow		
24–26 July 2007	Algeria	Algiers	Official visit	Discussed economic cooperation.
July 2007	Egypt	Cairo	State visit	Met with Egyptian officials to maintain long-standing diplomatic relations.
27 July–1 August 2007	Ethiopia	Addis Ababa		
August 2007	Singapore	Singapore	Official visit	Focused on economic development models.
March 2008	Namibia	Windhoek	Official visit	Attended the opening of the new Presidential Palace (built by North Korea).
March 2008	Angola	Luanda	Official visit	Met with President José Eduardo dos Santos.
March 2008	DR Congo	Kinshasa	Official visit	Met with President Joseph Kabila.
March 2008	Uganda	Kampala	Official visit	Met with President Yoweri Museveni.
August 2008	China	Beijing	2008 Summer Olympics	Attended the opening ceremony.
May 2009	South Africa	Johannesburg	Official visit	
May 2009	Zimbabwe	Harare	Official visit	
July 2009	Egypt	Sharm el-Sheikh	15th NAM Summit	Represented North Korea at the Non-Aligned Movement summit.
March 2010	Gabon	Libreville	Official visit	
April 2010	Gambia	Dakar	Official visit	
April 2010	Senegal	Dakar	Official visit	
May 2010	China	Shanghai	Shanghai World Expo	
December 2011	Tanzania	Dar-Es-Salaam	Official visit	
May 2012	Singapore	Singapore		
May 2012	Indonesia	Jakarta	State visit	Official visit to strengthen "traditional" friendship.
August 2012	Vietnam	Hanoi		
August 2012	Laos	Vientiane		
August 2012	Iran	Tehran	16th NAM Summit	Signed a cooperation agreement on science and technology.
August 2013	China	Beijing	Transit	Stopped by China while en route to Iran.
August 2013	Iran	Tehran	Official visit	Attended the first inauguration of Hassan Rouhani
February 2014	Russia	Sochi	2014 Winter Olympics	Attended the opening ceremony and met with Vladimir Putin.
October 2014	Sudan	Khartoum		
October 2014	Congo	Brazzaville		
October 2014	Uganda	Kampala		
May 2015	Russia	Moscow	Victory Day Parade	Represented the DPRK at the 70th anniversary of WWII victory.
August 2015	Egypt	Cairo		
May 2016	Equatorial Guinea	Malabo		
September 2016	Venezuela	Isla Margarita	17th NAM Summit	Met with President Nicolás Maduro.
August 2017	Iran	Tehran	Presidential Inauguration	Attended the second inauguration of Hassan Rouhani.
February 2018	South Korea	Pyeongchang	2018 Winter Olympics	Led the high-level delegation; first nominal head of state to visit the South.
June 2018	Russia	Moscow	2018 FIFA World Cup	Attended the opening ceremony of the World Cup.
November 2018	Cuba	Havana	State visit	Met with President Miguel Díaz-Canel.
November 2018	Venezuela	Caracas	State visit	Strengthened ties with the Maduro administration.
December 2018	Mexico	Mexico City	Presidential Inauguration	Attended the inauguration of Andrés Manuel López Obrador.

== Works ==
- Kim Yong-nam (1985). "Interview with Yong-Nam Kim, Vice-Premier and Foreign Minister of the Democratic Peoples's Republic of Korea". Journal of Northeast Asian Studies. 4 (3): 66–75. doi:10.1007/BF03025039. S2CID 198509640.
- — (September 1988). "The International Prestige and Influence of the DPRK Are Increasing Daily" (PDF). Kulloja. OCLC 9516938. Archived from the original (PDF) on October 5, 2022.

== See also ==
- Politics of North Korea

Political offices
Preceded by Ho Dam	Minister of Foreign Affairs; 1983–1998	Succeeded by Paek Nam-sun
Preceded by Yang Hyong-sop	President of the Presidium of the Supreme People's Assembly; 1998–2019	Succeeded by Choe Ryong-hae
