= Kim Yong-dae (politician) =

North Korean politician (born 1937)

Vice President of the Presidium of the Supreme People's Assembly
- In office April 2009 – 30 August 2019
- President: Kim Yong-nam; Choe Ryong-hae

Chairman of the Korean Social Democratic Party
- In office August 1998 – 30 August 2019
- Succeeded by: Pak Yong-il

Personal details
- Born: 12 December 1937 (age 88) South Hamgyong Province
- Party: Korean Social Democratic Party
- Education: Kim Il Sung University

Korean name
- Hangul: 김영대
- Hanja: 金永大
- RR: Gim Yeongdae
- MR: Kim Yŏngdae

Kim Yong-dae (Korean: 김영대, born 12 December 1937) is a North Korean politician. He is the chairman of the National Reconciliation Council. He was the leader of the Korean Social Democratic Party from 1998 to 2019.

== Early life and career ==
Kim Yong-dae was born on 12 December 1937 in South Hamgyong Province. He is a graduate of Kim Il Sung University, where he completed a three-year course.

Kim became the vice chairman of the Central Committee of the Korean Social Democratic Party in September 1989. He became its chairman in August 1998. Kim was succeeded by Pak Yong-il in 2019.

Kim was first elected a member of the Supreme People's Assembly (SPA) in the 1990 North Korean parliamentary election. As the parliament began its session, Kim was chosen as the vice chairman of its Foreign Affairs committee and a member of the Credentials Committee. Next year, he became the president of the Parliamentary North Korea–Indonesia Friendship Group, vice chairman of the Parliamentary North Korea–Iran Friendship Group, and Vice President of the North Korea–Japan Friendship Association. Kim is the chairman of the National Reconciliation Council.

Kim renewed his SPA seat in 1998 (496th Electoral District) and in 2003 (86th Electoral District). In 2009, he was elected again, this time from the 97th Electoral District.

Kim became a vice president of the SPA Presidium since 1998. Kim's constituency since the 2019 North Korean parliamentary election is the 118th Electoral District (Jangsang). He was replaced in the Presidium by the new party chairman Pak Yong-il on 29 August 2019.

Fyodor Tertitskiy of NK News characterizes Kim as "just another North Korean bureaucrat" and of less interest than Ryu Mi-yong, the head of the other minor party, Chondoist Chongu Party. Kim was placed second to last on the funeral committee of Kim Jong Il, ahead of only Ryu, testifying to the low-ranking position of heads of minor parties in the North Korean hierarchy.

In August 2004, he met with Ted Turner, the founder of CNN, although the meeting was strictly supervised. In 2012, Kim Yong-dae met with the South Korean Unified Progressive Party representatives and signed a joint-statement condemning Japan's activities in the Liancourt Rocks dispute.

He received the Order of Kim Jong Il in February 2012.

Party political offices
Preceded by Kim Pyong-sik	Chairman of the Korean Social Democratic Party; 1998–2019	Succeeded by Pak Yong-il
