= 8th Central Committee of the Workers' Party of Korea =

Current WPK Central Committee

8th Central Committee
- Emblem of the Workers' Party of North Korea

10 January 2021 – 22 February 2026 (5 years, 43 days) Overview
- Type: Central Committee of the Workers' Party of Korea
- Election: 8th Congress

Leadership
- General Secretary: Kim Jong Un
- Presidium: 5
- Politburo: 19 full 11 alt.
- Secretariat: 8
- Auditing organ: 15

Members
- Total: 139

Alternates
- Total: 111

The 8th Central Committee of the Workers' Party of Korea (Korean: 제8기 조선로동당 중앙위원회) was elected at the party's 8th Congress on 10 January 2021, and sat until the election of the 9th Central Committee on 22 February 2026. In between party congresses and specially convened conferences the Central Committee is the highest decision-making institution in the WPK and North Korea. The Central Committee is not a permanent institution and delegates day-to-day work to the Presidium, the Politburo, the Secretariat, the Central Military Commission and the Central Auditing Commission. It convenes meetings, known as "Plenary Session of the [term] Central Committee", to discuss major policies. Only full members have the right to vote, but if a full member cannot attend a plenary session, the person's spot is taken over by an alternate. Plenary session can also be attended by non-members, such meetings are known as "Enlarged Plenary Session", to participate in the committee's discussions.

== Plenary meetings ==
- 1st Plenary Meeting: 10 January 2021
- 2nd Plenary Meeting: 8–11 February 2021
- 3rd Plenary Meeting: 15–18 June 2021
- 4th Plenary Meeting: 27–31 December 2021
- 5th Enlarged Plenary Meeting: 8–10 June 2022
- 6th Enlarged Plenary Meeting: 26–31 December 2022
- 7th Enlarged Plenary Meeting: 26 February – 1 March 2023
- 8th Enlarged Plenary Meeting: 16–18 June 2023
- 9th Enlarged Plenary Meeting: 26–30 December 2023
- 10th Enlarged Plenary Meeting: 28 June – 1 July 2024
- 11th Enlarged Plenary Meeting: 23–27 December 2024
- 12th Enlarged Plenary Meeting: 21–23 June 2025
- 13th Enlarged Plenary Meeting: 9–11 December 2025

== Composition ==
=== Members ===
The following were elected as members of the 8th Central Committee.

The names of members are listed according to the order of their election at the 8th Congress. Members who have an en dash (—) in the Rank column were by-elected during the term of the 8th Central Committee.

Rank	Name	Korean	7th (Note: Status in the 7th Central Committee at the end of its term.)	9th (Note: Status in the 9th Central Committee at the start of its term.)
1	Kim Jong Un	김정은	Member	Member
2	Choe Ryong-hae	최룡해	Member	No
3	Ri Pyong-chol	리병철	Member	No
4	Kim Tok-hun	김덕훈	Member	Member
5	Kim Jae-ryong	김재룡	Member	Member
6	Ri Il-hwan	리일환	Member	Member
7	Choe Hwi	최휘	Member	No
8	Pak Thae-dok	박태덕	Member	No
9	Kim Yong-chol (Note: Kim Yong-chol was recalled as a member. He returned as a member by being directly by-elected on 18 June 2023.)	김영철	Member	No
10	Ho Chol-man	허철만	Member	No
11	Kim Hyong-sik	김형식	No	Member
12	Pak Myong-sun	박명순	Member	No
13	Choe Sang-gon	최상건	Member	No
14	O Il-jong	오일정	Member	No
15	Kim Yong-su (Note: Kim Yong-su was recalled. He returned as a member by being directly by-elected on 28 December 2022, but was later recalled again.)	김용수	Member	No
16	Sin Ryong-man	신룡만	Member	No
17	Jon Hyon-chol	전현철	Alternate	Member
18	Jo Yong-won	조용원	Member	Member
19	Ri Hi-yong (Note: Ri Hi-yong was recalled as a member. He returned as a member by being directly by-elected on 24 December 2024.)	리히용	Member	Member
20	Pak Thae-song (Note: Pak Thae-song was recalled as a member. He returned as a member by being directly by-elected on 31 December 2021.)	박태성	Member	Member
21	Kim Yo Jong	김여정	Member	Member
22	Ri Yong-sik (Note: Ri Yong-sik was recalled as a member. He returned as a member by being directly by-elected on 1 July 2024.)	리영식	Member	Member
23	Kim Song-nam	김성남	Member	Member
24	Hong Sung-mu	홍승무	Member	No
25	Jang Kwang-myong	장광명	Alternate	No
26	Choe Tong-myong (Note: Choe Tong-myong was recalled as a member. He returned as a member by being directly by-elected on 1 March 2023.)	최동명	Member	No
27	Jong Sang-hak	정상학	No	No
28	Pak Song-chol (Note: Pak Song-chol was recalled as a member. He returned as a member by being directly by-elected on 28 December 2023.)	박성철	No	Member
29	Ri Kyong-chol	리경철	No	Member
30	An Kum-chol (Note: An Kum-chol was recalled as a member. He returned as a member by being directly by-elected on 1 March 2023.)	안금철	No	Member
31	Hyon Song-wol	현송월	Member	Member
32	Kim Pyong-ho	김병호	Member	Member
33	Jang Ryong-sik	장룡식	Alternate	No
34	Kim Jo-guk (Note: Recalled as a member.)	김조국	Member	No
35	Pak Kwang-sik	박광식	No	Member
36	Kim Song-gi	김성기	No	Member
37	Pak Kwang-ung	박광웅	No	Member
38	Kim Jong-sik (Note: Kim Jong-sik was recalled as a member. He returned as a member by being directly by-elected on 28 December 2023.)	김정식	Member	Member
39	Jo Yong-chol	조영철	Alternate	No
40	Kim Se-bok	김세복	No	No
41	Pak Jong-nam	박정남	Member	No
42	Kim Song-chol	김성철	No	Member
43	Jong In-chol	정인철	No	Member
44	Jon Thae-su	전태수	No	Member
45	Pak Yong-min	박영민	No	Member
46	Ma Jong-son	마종선	No	No
47	Thae Hyong-chol	태형철	Member	No
48	Ko Kil-son	고길선	Member	Member
49	O Tong-il	오동일	No	Member
50	Yang Sung-ho	양승호	Member	No
51	O Su-yong	오수용	Member	No
52	Kim Yong-hwan (Note: Kim Yong-hwan was recalled as a member. He returned as a member by being directly by-elected on 28 December 2023.)	김영환	Member	No
53	Kim Tu-il (Note: Kim Tu-il was recalled as a member. He returned as a member by being by-elected on 28 December 2022, from alternate members.)	김두일	Member	Member
54	Ri Jae-nam	리재남	Member	Member
55	Mun Kyong-dok	문경덕	Member	No
56	Ri Chol-man	리철만	Member	Member
57	Pak Chang-ho	박창호	Member	Member
58	Kang Pong-hun	강봉훈	Member	No
59	Kim Chol-sam	김철삼	Member	Member
60	Ri Jong-nam	리정남	No	Member
61	Ri Thae-il	리태일	Member	No
62	Sin Yong-chol	신영철	Member	Member
63	Jang Yong-rok	장영록	Alternate	No
64	Rim Kyong-man	림경만	Member	No
65	Ri Son-gwon	리선권	Member	No
66	Jon Hak-chol	전학철	Member	No
67	Kim Chung-gol	김충걸	Member	No
68	Kang Jong-gwan	강종관	Member	No
69	Kim Jong-nam	김정남	Member	No
70	Pak Hun	박훈	Member	Member
71	Ri Song-hak	리성학	Alternate	No
72	Song Chun-sop	송춘섭	Member	No
73	Ri Chung-gil	리충길	Member	No
74	Kim Sung-jin	김승진	Alternate	Member
75	Kim Kyong-jun	김경준	Member	No
76	Kim Sung-du	김승두	Member	Member
77	Jang Ki-ho	장기호	Member	No
78	Pak Jong-gun	박정근	Alternate	Member
79	Jang Chun-song	장춘성	No	No
80	Kim Song-ryong	김성룡	No	No
81	Kim Yu-il	김유일	No	Member
82	Ri Yong-gil	리영길	Member	Member
83	Jong Kyong-thaek	정경택	No	Member
84	Jang Jong-nam	장정남	Member	No
85	Kim Kwang-chol	김광철	Member	No
86	Jang Kwang-bong	장광봉	No	No
87	Kang Yun-sok	강윤석	Member	No
88	U Sang-chol	우상철	No	No
89	Jang Chang-ha (Note: Jang Chang-ha was recalled as a member. He returned as a member by being directly by-elected on 28 December 2023.)	장창하	Member	Member
90	Ri Hong-sop	리홍섭	Member	No
91	Kang Kyong-ho	강경호	No	Member
92	Rim Yong-chol	림영철	Alternate	Member
93	Sim Hong-bin (Note: Sim Hong-bin was recalled as a member. He returned as a member by being by-elected on 28 December 2023, from alternate members.)	심홍빈	Alternate	Member
94	Kim Kum-chol	김금철	Member	Member
95	Ju Chol-gyu	주철규	No	Member
96	Yun Jae-hyok	윤재혁	Alternate	Member
97	Pak Mun-ho	박문호	Alternate	Alternate
98	Kim Sun-chol	김순철	Alternate	No
99	Yu Jin (Note: Yu Jin was recalled as a member. He returned as a member by being directly by-elected in December 2022.)	유진	Alternate	Member
100	Kang Hak-chol	강학철	No	No
101	Ri Yong-hon	리용헌	No	Member
102	Kim Kwang-nam	김광남	Alternate	Member
103	Han Yong-il	한영일	No	Member
104	Kim Chol-ha	김철하	Alternate	No
105	Ri Kwang-chol	리광철	Member	No
106	No Kwang-chol (Note: No Kwang-chol was recalled as a member. He returned as a member by being directly by-elected on 24 December 2024.)	노광철	Member	Member
107	Jon Il-ho (Note: Jon Il-ho was recalled as a member. He returned as a member by being directly by-elected on 28 December 2023.)	전일호	Member	Member
108	Ri Kuk-chol	리국철	No	No
109	Choe Pyong-wan	최병완	Alternate	No
110	Pak Jong-chon (Note: Pak Jong-chon was recalled as a member. He returned as a member by being directly by-elected on 28 December 2023.)	박정천	Member	No
111	Kim Su-gil	김수길	Member	Member
112	Kim Jong-gwan	김정관	Member	Member
113	Jo Kyong-chol	조경철	Member	No
114	Pang Tu-sop (Note: Pang Tu-sop was recalled as a member. He returned as a member by being directly by-elected on 28 December 2022.)	방두섭	Member	Member
115	Rim Kwang-il	림광일	Member	No
116	Kwon Thae-yong	권태영	Member	Member
117	Kang Sun-nam	강순남	Alternate	Member
118	So Hong-chan	서홍찬	Member	Member
119	Kwon Yong-jin	권영진	Member	No
120	Ri Tu-song	리두성	Member	No
121	Pak Yong-il	박영일	No	Member
122	Kim Myong-sik	김명식	Member	No
123	Kim Kwang-hyok (Note: Kim Kwang-hyok was recalled as a member. He returned as a member by being directly by-elected on 31 December 2021.)	김광혁	Member	Member
124	Kim Jong-gil	김정길	No	No
125	Pak Su-il (Note: Pak Su-il was recalled as a member. He returned as a member by being by-elected on 8 June 2022, from alternate members.)	박수일	Member	No
126	Choe Tu-yong	최두용	Member	Member
127	Wi Song-il	위성일	Member	No
128	Pak Kwang-ju	박광주	Member	No
129	Ri Thae-sop	리태섭	Member	No
130	Choe Chun-gil	최춘길	Alternate	Member
131	Pak Myong-su	박명수	Member	No
132	Song Yong-gon (Note: Song Yong-gon was recalled as a member. He returned as a member by being by-elected on 28 December 2022, from alternate members.)	송영건	Member	No
133	Ri Yong-chol	리영철	Alternate	Member
134	Kim Yong-bok	김영복	Member	Member
135	Ri Pong-chun	리봉춘	Member	Member
136	Choe Kwang-il	최광일	Alternate	Member
137	Song Sok-won	송석원	Member	No
138	Kwak Chang-sik	곽창식	Member	No
139	Han Sun-chol	한순철	No	No
—	Kim Tong-il (Note: By-elected as a member on 11 February 2021, from alternate members.)	김동일	Alternate	No
—	Kim Yong-nam	김영남	Alternate	Member
—	Kim Chol-su	김철수	Alternate	No
—	Kim Ki-ryong (Note: By-elected as a member on 18 June 2021, from alternate members.)	김기룡	Alternate	Member
—	Ri Kyong-chon (Note: Ri Kyong-chon was by-elected as a member on 18 June 2021, from alternate members, but was later recalled.)	리경천	Alternate	No
—	Kim Yong-gwang (Note: Directly by-elected as a member on 18 June 2021.)	김영광	No	No
—	Kim Pong-chol	김봉철	No	Member
—	Ju Chang-il	주창일	No	Member
—	Kim Sung-chan	김승찬	No	Member
—	Song Ki-chol	송기철	Alternate	Member
—	Kim Chung-il	김충일	No	No
—	Ko In-chol (Note: Ko In-chol was directly by-elected as a member on 18 June 2021, but was later recalled.)	고인철	No	Alternate
—	Han Ryong-guk (Note: By-elected as a member on 31 December 2021, from alternate members.)	한룡국	Alternate	No
—	Wang Chang-uk	왕창욱	Alternate	Member
—	Ju Yong-il	주용일	No	Member
—	So Jong-jin	서종진	No	Member
—	Ri Hyok-gwon	리혁권	No	No
—	Jin Kum-song	진금송	No	Member
—	Im Kyong-jae	임경재	No	No
—	Kim Il-guk	김일국	Alternate	Member
—	Chae Song-hak	채성학	No	No
—	Ri Chol-san	리철산	No	Member
—	Kang Hyong-bong	강형봉	Alternate	No
—	Kye Myong-chol	계명철	No	No
—	Ri Jong-gil	리정길	Alternate	No
—	Ri Kyong-ho	리경호	No	No
—	O Kum-chol	오금철	Alternate	Member
—	Kim Pok-nam	김복남	No	Member
—	Ri Chang-song (Note: Directly by-elected as a member on 31 December 2021.)	리창성	No	No
—	Kim Hwa-song	김화성	No	Member
—	Cha Myong-nam	차명남	No	No
—	Pak Ji-min (Note: By-elected as a member on 8 June 2022, from alternate members.)	박지민	No	Member
—	Choe Son-hui	최선희	Member	Member
—	Jo Chun-ryong (Note: Directly by-elected as a member on 8 June 2022.)	조춘룡	Member	Member
—	Pak Hui-chol	박희철	No	Member
—	Kim In-chol	김인철	No	No
—	Ri Chang-dae	리창대	No	Member
—	Han Kwang-sang	한광상	Member	Member
—	Jon Sung-guk (Note: By-elected as a member on 28 December 2022, from alternate members.)	전승국	No	Member
—	Pak Song-chol	박성철	No	Member
—	Choe Chol-ung (Note: Directly by-elected as a member on 28 December 2022.)	최철웅	No	Member
—	Pak Myong-son	박명선	Alternate	Member
—	Ri Yong-sik	리영식	Member	Member
—	Paek Song-guk	백성국	No	Member
—	Kim Yong-hwan	김용환	No	Member
—	Ri Ho-rim	리호림	Member	Member
—	Ho Chol-yong	허철용	Member	Member
—	Sin Ki-chol	신기철	No	No
—	Kim Sang-gon	김상건	No	No
—	Ri Hye-jong	리혜정	Alternate	No
—	Kim Song-jun (Note: By-elected as a member on 1 March 2023, from alternate members.)	김성준	No	No
—	Choe Kun-yong (Note: Directly by-elected as a member on 1 March 2023.)	최근영	No	Member
—	Jong Myong-do	정명도	No	Member
—	Choe Hui-thae (Note: By-elected as a member on 18 June 2023, from alternate members.)	최희태	No	Member
—	Kim Son-uk	김선욱	Alternate	Member
—	Kim Yong-gyu (Note: Directly by-elected as a member on 18 June 2023.)	김영규	Alternate	No
—	Jo Yong-dok (Note: By-elected as a member on 28 December 2023, from alternate members.)	조용덕	Alternate	Member
—	Jong Yong-nam	정용남	No	Member
—	Ri Chang-gil	리창길	Alternate	Member
—	Han Myong-su	한명수	No	No
—	Myong Song-chol	명송철	Alternate	No
—	Choe Jun-ho (Note: Directly by-elected as a member on 28 December 2023.)	최준호	No	Member
—	Kim Myong-hun	김명훈	No	No
—	Ko Pyong-hyon	고병현	Member	Member
—	Ryu Sang-hun	류상훈	No	Member
—	Kim Chol-won	김철원	No	Member
—	Kim Chung-song (Note: By-elected as a member on 1 July 2024, from alternate members.)	김충성	No	No
—	Sung Jong-gyu	승정규	No	No
—	Kim Jong-sun	김정순	Alternate	No
—	Jong Myong-su (Note: By-elected as a member on 24 December 2024, from alternate members.)	정명수	No	No
—	Yun Jong-ho	윤정호	No	Member
—	Song Jun-sol (Note: Directly by-elected as a member on 24 December 2024.)	송준설	Alternate	No
—	Kang Myong-chol	강명철	No	Member

=== Alternate members ===
The following were elected as alternate members of the 8th Central Committee.

The names of alternate members are listed according to the order of their election at the 8th Congress. Alternate members who have an en dash (—) in the Rank column were by-elected during the term of the 8th Central Committee.

Rank	Name	Korean	7th (Note: Status in the 7th Central Committee at the end of its term.)	9th (Note: Status in the 9th Central Committee at the start of its term.)
1	Kim Tong-il (Note: By-elected as a member on 11 February 2021.)	김동일	Alternate	No
2	Ri Song-bong	리성봉	No	Alternate
3	Ji Myong-jun	지명준	No	No
4	Ri Kye-bong	리계봉	No	Alternate
5	Ri Ryong-nam	리룡남	Alternate	Alternate
6	Kim Chol-su	김철수	Alternate	No
7	Han Ryong-guk (Note: By-elected as a member on 31 December 2021.)	한룡국	Alternate	No
8	Wang Chang-uk	왕창욱	Alternate	Member
9	Ri Tam	리담	Alternate	No
10	Kang Chol-gu	강철구	Alternate	No
11	Kim Il-guk	김일국	Alternate	Member
12	Chae Song-hak	채성학	No	No
13	Ri Chol-san	리철산	No	Member
14	Choe Son-hui (Note: By-elected as a member on 8 June 2022.)	최선희	Member	Member
15	Jo Yong-dok (Note: By-elected as a member on 28 December 2023.)	조용덕	Alternate	Member
16	Ri Chan-hwa	리찬화	Alternate	No
17	Kim Ki-ryong (Note: By-elected as a member on 18 June 2021.)	김기룡	Alternate	Member
18	So Ho-won	서호원	No	No
19	Yun Jong-ho (Note: By-elected as a member on 24 December 2024.)	윤정호	No	Member
20	Im Kyong-jae	임경재	No	No
21	Ju Yong-il	주용일	No	Member
22	Pak Hyok-chol	박혁철	No	No
23	Ri Hyok-gwon	리혁권	No	No
24	Jang Kyong-il	장경일	No	No
25	Jin Kum-song	진금송	No	Member
26	Kim Chung-song (Note: By-elected as a member on 1 July 2024.)	김충성	No	No
27	Choe Kyong-chol	최경철	Alternate	Alternate
28	Nam Chol-gwang	남철광	No	No
29	Ko Jong-bom	고정범	No	No
30	So Jong-jin	서종진	No	Member
31	Kim Yong-sik (Note: Kim Yong-sik was recalled as an alternate member. He returned as an alternate member by being by-elected on 28 December 2022.)	김영식	No	Alternate
32	Sim Sung-gon	심승건	No	No
33	Kang Kwon-il	강권일	No	No
34	Sung Jong-gyu	승정규	No	No
35	Pak Chol-min	박철민	Alternate	No
36	Jang Chun-sil	장춘실	Alternate	No
37	Pak In-chol	박인철	No	No
38	Han Jong-hyok	한종혁	No	Alternate
39	Sin Hong-chol	신홍철	Alternate	Alternate
40	Ri Song-ryol	리성렬	No	No
41	Choe Hui-thae	최희태	No	Member
42	Kang Hyong-bong	강형봉	Alternate	No
43	Kim Yong-chol	김영철	Alternate	No
44	Ri Hyong-gun	리형근	Alternate	No
45	Pak Man-ho	박만호	Alternate	No
46	Ri Song-guk	리성국	Alternate	No
47	Sin Chang-il	신창일	Alternate	Alternate
48	O Kyong-ryong	오경룡	No	No
49	Kye Myong-chol	계명철	No	No
50	Pak Myong-son	박명선	Alternate	Member
51	Pak Jong-ho	박종호	Alternate	No
52	Kim Yong-nam	김영남	Alternate	Member
53	Jo Jun-mo	조준모	Alternate	No
54	Ri Sung-ho	리승호	Alternate	No
55	Choe Myong-su	최명수	No	No
56	Sin Myong-son	신명선	No	Alternate
57	Kim Jin-yong	김진용	Alternate	Alternate
58	Ri Hang-gol	리항걸	No	No
59	Han Man-hung	한만흥	No	Alternate
60	Yang Myong-chol	양명철	Alternate	Member
61	Kim Kwang-bok	김광복	No	No
62	Song Sung-chol	송승철	No	Alternate
63	O Chun-yong	오춘영	Alternate	Member
64	Ham Se-jin	함세진	Alternate	No
65	Kim Hyon-il	김현일	No	No
66	Ok Yong-su	옥용수	No	No
67	Ri Jong-gil	리정길	Alternate	No
68	Ri Chang-gil	리창길	Alternate	Member
69	Choe Song-nam	최성남	Alternate	Alternate
70	An Pok-man	안복만	No	No
71	Choe Jang-il	최장일	No	No
72	Ko Myong-chol	고명철	Alternate	No
73	Jang Kyong-chol	장경철	Alternate	No
74	Han Myong-su	한명수	No	No
75	Kim Son-uk	김선욱	Alternate	Member
76	Choe Sung-ryong	최승룡	Alternate	No
77	Ro Ik	로익	No	Alternate
78	Jong Yon-hak	정연학	No	Alternate
79	Choe Rak-hyon	최락현	Alternate	No
80	So Won-gil	서원길	No	No
81	Kim Yong-chol	김영철	Alternate	No
82	Ham Nam-hyok	함남혁	No	No
83	Han Song-nam	한성남	Alternate	No
84	Kim Kwang-yong	김광영	Alternate	No
85	Myong Song-chol	명송철	Alternate	No
86	Hong Man-ho	홍만호	Alternate	No
87	Thae Jin-hyok	태진혁	No	No
88	Ri Kyong-il	리경일	Alternate	Member
89	Kim Myong-hyok	김명혁	No	No
90	Kim Hyong-bom	김형범	No	Alternate
91	Kim Yong-gu	김용구	Alternate	No
92	Kim Su-nam	김수남	No	No
93	Ri Song-do	리성도	No	No
94	O Kum-chol	오금철	Alternate	Member
95	Mun Jong-ung	문정웅	Alternate	No
96	Choe Kyong-chol	최경철	No	Alternate
97	Kang Son	강선	Alternate	No
98	Kim Kwang-uk	김광욱	Alternate	Alternate
99	Ho Kwang-il	허광일	Alternate	No
100	Pak Ji-min	박지민	No	Member
101	Kim Jong-chol	김정철	Alternate	Alternate
102	Ri Min-chol	리민철	Alternate	No
103	Min Hui-bok	민희복	Alternate	No
104	Ri Kyong-chon (Note: Ri Kyong-chon was by-elected as a member on 18 June 2021. He was returned as an alternate member by being by-elected on 31 December 2021.)	리경천	Alternate	No
105	Ko Myong-su	고명수	Alternate	Alternate
106	Kim Hak-chol	김학철	Alternate	Alternate
107	Kim Ju-sam	김주삼	Alternate	No
108	Kim Chun-gyo	김춘교	No	Alternate
109	Kim Yong-ho	김용호	Alternate	No
110	Rim Kwang-ung	림광웅	Alternate	No
111	Kim Pok-nam	김복남	No	Member
—	Hong Hyok-chol (Note: By-elected as an alternate member on 11 February 2021.)	홍혁철	No	No
—	Ri Kyong-ho (Note: Ri Kyong-ho was by-elected as an alternate member on 11 February 2021, and as a member on 31 December 2021.)	리경호	No	No
—	Choe Yong-jin	최영진	No	No
—	Ryong Kun-chol	룡군철	No	Alternate
—	Jong So-chol	정서철	No	No
—	Im Hak-won (Note: By-elected as an alternate member on 18 June 2021.)	임학원	No	No
—	Kim Song-jun (Note: Kim Song-jun was by-elected as an alternate member on 18 June 2021, and as a member on 1 March 2023.)	김성준	No	No
—	Mun Chol	문철	No	Alternate
—	Pak Chol-ho	박철호	No	No
—	Kim Jong-chol	김정철	No	No
—	Hong Chol-ung	홍철웅	No	Alternate
—	Kim Chol-hui	김철희	No	No
—	Sim Hong-bin (Note: Sim Hong-bin was by-elected as an alternate member on 31 December 2021, and as a member on 28 December 2023.)	심홍빈	Alternate	Member
—	Kim Jong-gil (Note: Kim Jong-gil was by-elected as an alternate member on 31 December 2021, but was later recalled. He was returned as an alternate member by being by-elected on 28 December 2023.)	김정길	No	No
—	Pak Su-il (Note: Pak Su-il was by-elected as an alternate member on 31 December 2021, and as a member on 8 June 2022.)	박수일	Member	No
—	Pak Kwang-ju (Note: By-elected as an alternate member on 31 December 2021.)	박광주	Member	No
—	Choe Chun-gil	최춘길	Alternate	Member
—	Song Yong-gon (Note: Song Yong-gon was by-elected as an alternate member on 31 December 2021, and as a member on 28 December 2022.)	송영건	Member	No
—	Ri Pong-chun	리봉춘	Member	Member
—	Ko In-chol	고인철	No	Alternate
—	Choe Kwang-il	최광일	Alternate	Member
—	Song Sok-won	송석원	Member	No
—	Kim Kwang-il	김광일	No	Member
—	Kim Jong-sun (Note: Kim Jong-sun was by-elected as an alternate member on 31 December 2021, and as a member on 1 July 2024.)	김정순	Alternate	No
—	Pak Song-chol (Note: Pak Song-chol was by-elected as an alternate member on 31 December 2021, and as a member on 28 December 2022.)	박성철	No	Member
—	Paek Hyong-chol	백형철	No	No
—	Choe Kil-ryong	최길룡	No	No
—	Choe Kwang-jun	최광준	Alternate	No
—	Ri Kyong-chol	리경철	No	Alternate
—	Ko Nam-hyok	고남혁	No	No
—	Jo Sok-ho (Note: Jo Sok-ho was by-elected as an alternate member on 31 December 2021, but was later recalled. He returned as an alternate member by being by-elected on 1 July 2024.)	조석호	No	Alternate
—	Kang Myong-chol (Note: Kang Myong-chol was by-elected as an alternate member on 31 December 2021, and as a member on 24 December 2024.)	강명철	No	Alternate
—	Choe Ryong-gil	최룡길	No	Alternate
—	Jang Chang-min (Note: By-elected as an alternate member on 8 June 2022.)	장창민	No	Alternate
—	Kim Sun-chol	김순철	Alternate	No
—	Sin Chang-nam	신창남	No	No
—	Ma Hyok-chol	마혁철	No	Alternate
—	Pak Hyong-ryol	박형렬	No	No
—	Kwak Jong-jun	곽정준	No	No
—	Ri Tu-il	리두일	No	No
—	Kim Tu-il (Note: Kim Tu-il was by-elected as an alternate member on 8 June 2022, and as a member on 28 December 2022.)	김두일	Member	Member
—	Kwak Yong-ho	곽영호	No	Alternate
—	Ryo Chol-ung	려철웅	No	No
—	An Yong-hwan	안영환	No	Alternate
—	Jon Sung-guk (Note: Jon Sung-guk was by-elected as an alternate member on 8 June 2022, and as a member on 28 December 2022.)	전승국	No	Member
—	Thae Hyong-chol (Note: By-elected as an alternate member on 28 December 2022.)	태형철	Member	No
—	Kim Chang-sok	김창석	No	Member
—	Jo Sok-chol	조석철	No	No
—	Jong Yong-nam (Note: Jong Yong-nam was by-elected as an alternate member on 28 December 2022, and as a member on 28 December 2023.)	정용남	No	Member
—	Ri Song-bom	리성범	No	Alternate
—	Kim Phyong-hyon	김평현	No	No
—	Won Kyong-mo	원경모	No	Alternate
—	Sin Song-guk	신성국	No	Alternate
—	An Sung-hak	안승학	No	Alternate
—	Ho Chol-ho	허철호	No	Member
—	Song Myong-hun	송명훈	No	No
—	Pae Song-guk	배성국	No	Alternate
—	Kim Kum-chol	김금철	Member	Alternate
—	O Chol-su	오철수	No	No
—	Choe Son-il	최선일	No	No
—	Kim Son-guk	김선국	No	Member
—	Jang Se-il	장세일	No	No
—	Ri Kyong-il (Note: Ri Kyong-il was by-elected as an alternate member on 28 December 2022, but was later recalled. He returned as an alternate member by being by-elected on 28 December 2023.)	리경일	Alternate	Member
—	Jon In-chol	전인철	No	No
—	Kim Tu-hong	김두홍	No	Alternate
—	Pak In-gi	박인기	No	Alternate
—	Yu Chol-u	유철우	Alternate	Alternate
—	Kim Song-chol	김성철	No	Alternate
—	Choe Tu-yong	최두용	Member	Member
—	Ryang Kil-song	량길성	No	No
—	Kim Kwang-un (Note: By-elected as an alternate member on 1 March 2023.)	김광운	No	Alternate
—	Jang Yong-chol	장영철	No	Alternate
—	Sonu Yong-hyok	선우영혁	No	Alternate
—	Hong Pyong-chol (Note: By-elected as an alternate member on 18 June 2023.)	홍병철	No	Alternate
—	O Yong-jae	오영재	No	Alternate
—	Kim Pong-chol	김봉철	No	Alternate
—	Kim Yong-su (Note: By-elected as an alternate member on 28 December 2023.)	김용수	Member	No
—	Jo Yong-chol	조영철	Alternate	No
—	Ri Chung-gil	리충길	Member	No
—	An Kyong-gun	안경근	No	No
—	Ri Sun-chol	리순철	No	No
—	Kim Kwang-jin	김광진	No	Member
—	Paek Min-gwang	백민광	No	Alternate
—	Jong Song-gil	정성길	No	No
—	Ok Chang-guk	옥창국	No	Member
—	Kuk Myong-ho	국명호	No	No
—	Ri Sang-do	리상도	No	Member
—	Kim Kyong-jun	김경준	Member	No
—	Jong Mu-rim	정무림	No	No
—	Kim Yong-chun	김영춘	No	No
—	Pak Myong-ho	박명호	No	Alternate
—	Kim Chol-nam	김철남	No	Alternate
—	Choe Kyong-nam	최경남	No	Alternate
—	Kim Jong-su	김정수	No	Alternate
—	Jong Myong-su (Note: Jong Myong-su was by-elected as an alternate member on 1 July 2024, and as a member on 24 December 2024.)	정명수	No	No
—	Ri Myong-guk (Note: By-elected as an alternate member on 1 July 2024.)	리명국	No	Alternate
—	Jon Hyang-sun	전향순	No	Alternate
—	Choe Hyok-chol	최혁철	No	No
—	O Myong-chol	오명철	No	Alternate
—	Kim Song-chol	김성철	No	Alternate
—	Ju Hyon-ung	주현웅	No	Alternate
—	Kim Chol	김철	Member	Alternate
—	Choe Yong-il	최영일	No	No
—	Ri Yong-hyop	리용협	No	Alternate
—	Ri Song-bong	리성봉	No	Alternate
—	Kim Jo-guk (Note: By-elected as an alternate member on 24 December 2024.)	김조국	Member	No
—	Kim Yong-bok	김영복	Member	Member
—	Kwon Song-hwan	권성환	No	Alternate
—	Ri Man-su	리만수	No	No
—	Kim Song-bin	김성빈	No	Member
—	Jon Ryong-nam	전룡남	No	Member
—	Hwang Yong-gil	황영길	No	Alternate
—	Ri Jong-sik	리종식	No	No
—	Sin Chang-gil	신창길	No	Alternate
—	Yun Chi-gol	윤치걸	No	Alternate
—	Hong Kil-ho	홍길호	No	No

== Department directors ==
The following were appointed as department directors of the 8th Central Committee.

The names of department directors are listed according to the order of their appointment at the 1st Plenary Meeting of the 8th Central Committee. Department directors who have an en dash (—) in the Rank column were by-elected during the term of the 8th Central Committee.

Rank	Name	Korean	7th (Note: Status as department director at the end of the 7th Central Committee's term.)	9th (Note: Status as department director at the start of the 9th Central Committee's term.)
1	Pak Thae-song (Note: Pak Thae-song was appointed as director of the Publicity and Information Department on 10 January 2021.)	박태성	No	No
2	Ri Il-hwan (Note: Ri Il-hwan was appointed as director of the Working Organizations Department on 10 January 2021.)	리일환	Yes	Yes
3	Kim Tu-il (Note: Kim Tu-il was appointed as director of the Economic Affairs Department on January 10, 2021.)	김두일	No	No
4	Choe Sang-gon (Note: Choe Sang-gon was appointed as director of the Science and Education Department on January 10, 2021.)	최상건	Yes	No
5	Kim Jae-ryong (Note: Kim Jae-ryong was appointed as director of the Organizational Leadership Department on 10 January 2021, director of the Cadre Department on 28 December 2023, and director of the Discipline Investigation Department on 24 December 2024.)	김재룡	Yes	Yes
6	O Il-jong (Note: O Il-jong was appointed as director of the Military Political Leadership Department on 10 January 2021, and director of the Civil Defense Department on 28 December 2022.)	오일정	Yes	No
7	Pak Thae-dok (Note: Pak Thae-dok was appointed as director of the Discipline Investigation Department on 10 January 2021.)	박태덕	Yes	No
8	Kim Song-nam (Note: Kim Song-nam was appointed as director of the International Department on 10 January 2021.)	김성남	No	Yes
9	Ho Chol-man (Note: Ho Chol-man was appointed as director of the Cadre Department on 10 January 2021.)	허철만	Yes	No
10	Kim Hyong-sik (Note: Kim Hyong-sik was appointed as director of the Legal Department on 10 January 2021.)	김형식	No	No
11	Pak Myong-sun (Note: Pak Myong-sun was appointed as director of the Light Industry Department on 10 January 2021.)	박명순	Yes	No
12	Ri Chol-man (Note: Ri Chol-man was appointed as director of the Agricultural Department on 10 January 2021.)	리철만	No	No
13	Ri Tu-song (Note: Ri Tu-song was appointed as director of an unknown department on 10 January 2021. He was appointed as director of the Working Organizations Department at a latter unknown date, but was dismissed on 1 July 2024.)	리두성	No	No
14	Kang Sun-nam	강순남	No	No
15	Kim Yong-chol (Note: Kim Yong-chol was appointed as director of the United Front Department on 10 January 2021.)	김영철	No	No
16	Kim Se-bok	김세복	No	No
17	Pak Jong-nam	박정남	No	No
18	Choe Hwi	최휘	Yes	No
19	Kim Yong-su (Note: Kim Yong-su was appointed as director of an unknown department on 10 January 2021, and as director of the Finance and Accounting Department on 28 December 2022.)	김용수	No	No
—	O Su-yong (Note: O Su-yong was appointed as director of the Economic Affairs Department on 11 February 2021, and on 18 June 2023.)	오수용	No	No
—	Yu Jin (Note: Yu Jin was appointed as director of the Munitions Industry Department on 2 September 2021.)	유진	No	No
—	Jo Yong-won (Note: Jo Yong-won was appointed as director of the Organizational Leadership Department on 8 June 2022.)	조용원	No	No
—	Jo Chun-ryong (Note: Jo Chun-ryong was appointed as director of the Munitions Industry Department on 8 June 2022.)	조춘룡	No	Yes
—	Jon Hyon-chol (Note: Jon Hyon-chol was appointed as director of the Economic Affairs Department on 8 June 2022, and on 28 December 2023.)	전현철	No	No
—	Ri Chung-gil (Note: Ri Chung-gil was appointed as director of the Science and Education Department on 8 June 2022.)	리충길	No	No
—	Ri Son-gwon (Note: Ri Son-gwon was appointed as director of the United Front Department on 8 June 2022.)	리선권	No	No
—	Han Kwang-sang (Note: Han Kwang-sang was appointed as director of the Light Industry Department on 8 June 2022.)	한광상	No	No
—	Kim Sang-gon (Note: Kim Sang-gon was appointed as director of the Discipline Investigation Department on 28 December 2022.)	김상건	No	No
—	Ri Hye-jong (Note: Ri Hye-jong was appointed as director of the Party History Institute on 28 December 2022.)	리혜정	No	No
—	Choe Tong-myong (Note: Choe Tong-myong was appointed as director of the Science and Education Department on 1 March 2023.)	최동명	No	No
—	Pak Jong-chon (Note: Pak Jong-chon was appointed as director of the Military Political Leadership Department on 28 December 2023.)	박정천	No	No
—	Ju Chang-il (Note: Ju Chang-il was appointed as director of the Publicity and Information Department on 28 December 2023.)	주창일	No	No
—	Kim Chol-sam (Note: Kim Chol-sam was appointed as director of the Discipline Investigation Department on 28 December 2023.)	김철삼	No	No
—	Ju Chol-gyu (Note: Ju Chol-gyu was appointed as director of the Agricultural Department on 10 January 2021.)	주철규	No	Yes
—	Kim Jong-sun (Note: Kim Jong-sun was appointed as director of the Working Organizations Department on 1 July 2024.)	김정순	No	No
—	Ri Hi-yong (Note: Ri Hi-yong was appointed as director of the Cadre Department on 24 December 2024.)	리히용	No	Yes
—	Kim Tok-hun (Note: Kim Tok-hun was appointed as director of the Economic Affairs Department on 24 December 2024.)	김덕훈	No	No
