= Pyongyang City Committee of the Workers' Party of Korea =

North Korean government organization

- 조선로동당 평양시위원회
- Emblem of the Workers' Party of Korea

Agency overview
- Jurisdiction: Party, state
- Headquarters: Pyongyang, North Korea
- Agency executive: Kim Su-gil, Chief Secretary
- Parent agency: Central Committee

Pyongyang City Committee of the Workers' Party of Korea (Korean: 조선로동당 평양시위원회), also known as Pyongyang City Party Committee (Korean: 평양시당위원회) is the principal territorial organization of the Workers' Party of Korea, the ruling party of North Korea, in the capital and directly-governed city, Pyongyang. In North Korea's political system, it is considerably more important than a conventional municipal party organization: it is a major instrument through which the central Party leadership directs political, ideological, administrative, economic, social, and mobilizational affairs in the capital. The head of the committee is called Chief Secretary. The current chief secretary is Kim Su-gil who was appointed chief secretary of the Pyongyang City Committee in January 2023 at the enlarged Sixth Plenary Meeting of the 8th WPK Central Committee.

== History ==
The institutional roots of the Pyongyang Party organization lie in the establishment of Communist party structures in northern Korea immediately after the surrender of Japan and the liberation of Korea in August 1945.

In October 1945, the North Korean Branch Bureau of the Communist Party of Korea was established in Pyongyang. The organization subsequently developed into the North Korean Communist Party and, in August 1946, the Workers' Party of North Korea (NKWP), through the merger of the Communist Party and New People's Party. The merger involved not only the central leadership but also the lower-level city, county, and other Party organizations. In June 1949 the North Korean Workers' Party and the South Korean Workers' Party were merged into the Workers' Party of Korea. The Pyongyang city organization consequently became part of the nationwide WPK structure.

One of the major events in the history of the Pyongyang WPK Committee was the political purge surrounding Jang Song-thaek in 2013. Jang was an exceptionally powerful senior official and had extensive networks throughout the economic and administrative system. The Pyongyang City Party Committee was considered one of the institutions affected by his political network. When Kim Su-gil became Pyongyang's Party chief in 2014, outside analysts specifically connected his appointment to the post-Jang reorganization. 38 North noted that the Pyongyang committee had previously been headed by Mun Kyong-dok, described as a close Jang associate, and that the appointment of Kim Su-gil followed the purge and execution of Jang.

== Functions and structure ==
The Pyongyang City Party Committee is the main organ that is responsible for the political direction in the city. As a city (municipal committee) it includes Auditing Commission, Executive Committee, Secretariat, Inspection Committee and Military Committee. Among its functions are the following:

- Political organization;
- implementing Party policies;
- Strengthening party organization;
- Ideological education;
- Personnel management;
- Economic mobilization;
- Supervision of administrative organs;
- Supervision of mass organizations;
- Military/civil-defense preparation and mobilization;
- Party discipline;
- Party finances;
- Reporting to higher Party organizations;
- Implementation of central campaigns.

In the North Korean dual-power system, every level of state power has two organizations that work in parallel: party and state. As in the National level the Workers' Party of Korea works in parallel to the Cabinet, at the municipal level the Pyongyang City WPK Committee works in parallel to the Pyongyang City People's Committee which is the formal executive branch of the city.

== Chief secretaries ==
- Until 1946 Seo Hwi
- 1946 onward Kim Eung-han
- Early 1950s Yun Gong-hum
- 1953–56 Ko Bong-gi
- 1956–60 Ri Song-un
- 1960–62 Kim Kyong-sok
- 1963–64 Ho Sok-son
- 1964–66 Ri Song-un
- 1966–68 Kim Dong-gyu
- 1968–69 Kim Jwa-hyok
- 1969–74 Kang Song-san
- 1974–78 Kang Hyon-su
- 1978–86 So Yun-sok
- 1986–89 Kang Hui-won
- 1989–91 Choe Mun-son
- 1991–2000 Kang Hyon-su
- 2000–09 Position reportedly vacant
- 2009–10 Choe Yong-rim
- 2010–14 Mun Kyong-dok
- 2014–18 Kim Su-gil
- 2018–20 Kim Nung-o
- 2020–22 Kim Yong-hwan
- 2023–present Kim Su-gil

An indication of the committee's importance comes from the political careers of its secretaries. The Pyongyang Party chief could be promoted into the central Party leadership, demonstrating that the position was a significant political post rather than merely a municipal administrative office. For example, official biographical material records numerous senior officials moving between Pyongyang's Party organization and central Party institutions.
