= Kim Won-hong =

North Korean general (born 1945)

Minister of the State Security
- In office 2012–2018

Personal details
- Born: 17 July 1945 (age 80) Kōkai Province, Korea, Empire of Japan
- Party: Workers' Party of Korea
- Education: Kim Il Sung Higher Party School
- Occupation: Military officer

Military service
- Allegiance: North Korea
- Branch/service: Korean People's Army
- Rank: General

- Kim Won-hong
- Hangul: 김원홍
- Hanja: 金元弘
- RR: Gim Wonhong
- MR: Kim Wŏnhong

Kim Won-hong (Korean: 김원홍; born 17 July 1945) is a North Korean politician and military general.

== Early life and education ==
Kim was born in what is now North Korea's North Hwanghae Province. He graduated from the Workers' Party of Korea's Kim Il Sung Higher Party School and has been serving in the Korean People's Army since 1962, holding several positions in the army's General Political Bureau as well as commander of army corps. His first public mention was as a funeral committee member for late Marshal Choe Kwang in 1997. He was elected deputy to the Supreme People's Assembly in 1998.

== Career ==
Kim Won-hong rose to prominence in 2003, as he was appointed commander of the Military Security Command (the North Korean army's intelligence unit) following the death of General Won Ung-hui, who had been heading it since 1990. In April 2009, Kim was promoted to General and then migrated to the KPA General Political Bureau's Department, at the same time when Kim Jong Il reportedly put Kim Jong Un in charge of the Ministry of State Security to which the Military Security Command is affiliated. Kim was also made a member of the Party's Central Committee and Central Military Commission in September 2010 and was reported to having a role in ensuring Kim Jong Un's succession.

After Kim Jong Il's death and acting head of State Security Department, U Tong-chuk's purge, Kim Won-hong appeared as one of Kim Jong Un's most trusted and supporting generals. He was made a Politburo member as well as the first minister of State Security in 25 years in April 2012. He was also elected member of the National Defence Commission. The South Korean government reported in February 2017 that Kim Won-hong was fired in mid-January after he was demoted to a one-star general from a four-star one on charges of corruption and abuse of power. He then disappeared from public view, but resurfaced in April 2017 for Day of the Sun celebrations, bearing the four-star insignia on his uniform.

In late November 2017, Kim Won-hong was named as one of two North Korean officials punished for "impure behavior." According to South Korean Rep. Kim Byunk-kee, Kim Won Hong, identified as deputy director of North Korea's General Political Bureau (GPB), was reportedly punished along with the director of that bureau, identified as Hwang Pyong So. The form of punishment was unspecified.

Despite being punished he did appear at an April 2017 parade, though when Kim Jong Un walked by it appeared he was ignored possibly indicating he had lost some favor with him. In May 2017, he was appointed to Deputy Director of the KPA General Political Department. In September he was under investigation again and removed from the position with the WPK Organization and Guidance Department. During April and May 2018, he lost his positions as WPK Political Bureau, WPK Central Military Commission and the State Affairs Commission.¸

== Awards and honors ==
The official portrait of Won illustrates Won wearing all the decorations awarded to him.

Order of Kim Il Sung

Order of Kim Jong Il

Order of the National Flag First Class, eight times

Order of Freedom and Independence First Class

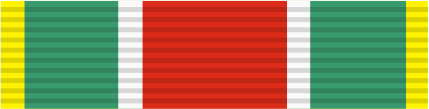
Order of Korean Labour

Commemorative Order "Foundation of the Democratic People's Republic of Korea"

Commemorative Order "50th Anniversary of the Foundation of the Democratic People's Republic of Korea"

Commemorative Order "Anniversary of the Foundation of the People's Army"

Order of Military Service Honour First Class

Commemorative Order "30th Anniversary of the Agricultural Presentation"

Order of the National Flag Second Class, three times

Order of Military Service Honour Second Class

Order of the Red Banner of Three Great Revolutions, twice

Order of the National Flag Third Class, three times

Order of Military Service Honour Third Class

Commemorative Medal "The Foundation of the People's Republic of Korea"

Medal For Military Merit, three times

Commemorative Medal "Military Parade"

Political offices
Vacant Title last held by Ri Chun-su; U Tong-chuk as first vice-minister	Minister of State Security; 2012–2018	Succeeded by Jong Kyong-thaek
Incumbent
Military offices
Preceded by Won Ung-hui	Commander of the Military Security Command; 2003–2009	Succeeded by Jo Kyong-chol
