= Kim Chol-won =

North Korean politician

- 김철원

Member of the Politburo of the Central Committee of the WPK
- Incumbent
- Assumed office 2026

Prosecutor General of the DPRK
- Incumbent
- Assumed office 2023
- Preceded by: U Sang-chol

Personal details
- Party: Workers' Party of Korea

Kim Chol-won (Korean: 김철원) is a North Korean politician and government official who is serving as member of the Politburo of the Workers' Party of Korea.

== Biography ==
On December 28, 2023, at the expanded 9th Plenary Meeting of the 8th Central Committee, he was appointed Director of the Supreme Public Prosecutors Office.

On July 22, 2024, he held talks with Igor Krasnov, the Prosecutor General of Russia, who was visiting North Korea. He was elected as an alternate member of the 8th politburo at the 11th Enlarged Plenary Meeting of the 8th WPK Central Committee in December 2024, marking the return of the head of the Central Public Prosecutors' Office to the Politburo.

On February 7, 2026, he attended the 27th Meeting of the 8th Politburo of the 8th Central Committee.

On February 19, he attended the 9th Congress of the WPK and was elected to its presidium. On February 22, 2026 he was re-elected as a member of the 9th Central Committee at the 9th Congress. On February 23, at the enlarged 1st Plenary Meeting of the 9th Central Committee, he was retained as an alternate member of the 9th Politburo and appointed as a member of the 9th Central Auditing Commission. During the 2026 parliamentary election he was elected a member of the 15th convocation of the Supreme People's Assembly and on March 23 2026, he attended the 1st Session of the 15th Supreme People's Assembly, where he was appointed as a member of the 15th convocation of the State Affairs Commission and retained as the Prosecutor General of the Central Public Prosecutors Office. In October 2026 he signed an agreement on behalf of North Korea with Russian Prosecutor General Aleksandr Gutsan on combating terrorism, smuggling ad law-enforcement cooperation.
