= Organization and Guidance Department =

North Korean government organization

Organization and Guidance Department of the Central Committee of the Workers' Party of Korea
- 조선로동당 조직지도부
- Emblem of the Workers' Party of Korea

Agency overview
- Formed: 15 September 1948
- Preceding agency: General Affairs Department
- Jurisdiction: Party, state and military
- Headquarters: Pyongyang, North Korea
- Agency executives: Jo Yong-won, Director; Ri Byong-chol, First Deputy Director; Kim Kyong-ok, First Deputy Director; Kim Jo-Guk, First Deputy Director; Min Byong-chol, Deputy Director; Hwang Pyong-so, Deputy Director; Jo Yong-won, Deputy Director
- Parent agency: Central Committee

The Organization and Guidance Department (OGD), or the Organizational Leadership Department (Official translation in North Korea) created in 1946, is a department of the Central Committee of the Workers' Party of Korea (WPK), the ruling party of North Korea. Its central responsibility is to implement the directives and teachings of Kim Il Sung, Kim Jong Il, and Kim Jong Un. The department was initially a department within the WPK General Affairs Department, but eventually spun off and was established at the 3rd Plenary Session of the 2nd Central Committee as the Organization Committee.

== Mission ==
The OGD has been referred to as a powerful department of the WPK that guides the implementation of all Party life policy, extending to nearly every aspect of life in North Korea from civilian, to military, to government. The OGD also serves as the staff for the Central Committee and Central Military Committee, and controls key personnel in the government, WPK, and Korean People's Army (KPA). This control stems from the OGD's power to select and dismiss high-ranking officials based on the monitoring it does, records it collects, and investigations it runs.

The OGD is also responsible for administering party life guidance to secure loyalty to the Kim family and maintain Party ideology, overseeing guidance implementation down to a local and even workplace level. It does this through local Organization Departments, which are a part of every KWP Committee and have political power due to their close link to the OGD. Since every North Korean citizen experiences party life in some form, regardless of actually joining the party, the OGD and its guidance have a direct effect on the lives of every North Korean from the highest to lowest level.

== Power ==
Due to a lack of information on the OGD from the North Korean government, there is a heavy reliance on defector testimony and expert analysis. Polish political scientist Nicolas Levi refers to the OGD as "The heart of the North Korean political system". According to North Korean defector Jang Jin-sung, the OGD is "the only entity that actually matters when it comes to decision-making or policy-making" and reflects the autocratic structure of the government. Hwang Jang-yop, another high-ranking defector, stated that the leading figures of North Korea belong to the OGD. Its officials regularly accompany the Great Leader during inspections and field guidance appearances. Some of its powers were given to the WPK Administrative Department (AD), in a bid to weaken the influence of those working in the OGD. However the AD itself was abolished in February 2014, after the execution of the AD Head Jang Song-thaek.

Some scholars and defectors argue that the leaders of the OGD are the real leaders of North Korea, that Kim Jong Un is a puppet. North Korean defector Jang Jin-sung argues that Hwang Pyong-so, the First Deputy Head of the OGD, through his post as director of the General Political Bureau of the Korean People's Army, was the real ruler of the country because he controlled the appointments and dismissals of military officers. However, none of the three following GPB Directors, Choe Ryong-hae, Kim Jong-gak and then Kim Su-gil, have been seen as true leaders of North Korea. Robert Collins at the Committee for Human Rights in North Korea maintains that the OGD truly implements directives of the Great Leader, and Michael Madden of the North Korea Leadership Watch concludes the OGD is not powerful enough to introduce directives itself.

== Leadership ==
High-ranking members of the OGD have significant power in the WPK. The director is often referred to as the second most powerful figure in the country, exemplified by the first director of the OGD being Kim Il Sung, the founder of the North Korean state, and his successor, Kim Jong Il (the Party General Secretary from 1997 to 2011) directing the OGD from September 1973 until his death in 2011. Under Kim Jong Il's stewardship, the OGD was turned into a center of power within the WPK. Therefore, OGD first deputy directors and deputy directors are leading figures within the North Korean establishment. Their position affords them privileges and a degree of secrecy that makes them "a kind of elite priesthood in the DPRK." Officials working within the OGD are not under the jurisdiction of state law or party bylaws, after a memorandum issued by Kim Jong Il in the 1980s turned the OGD into a partially secret organization. Sanctions against deputy heads are kept confidential from the rest of the party. Although lower ranking members of the OGD don't have these privileges to the same extent, any member of the OGD is considered to be in a position of power and privilege.

Members of the OGD, especially directors and deputy directors, are under constant and heavy surveillance and can be dismissed at any time for any reason by the Great Leader. He, as the head of every chain of leadership, has the final word on dismissals; for instance, in the 1990s Yun Sung-gwan, as deputy head, assumed control over the affairs of the OGD for two years, but was removed when Kim Jong Il believed he had amassed too much power. A similar case took place in 2003, when Jang Song-thaek was dismissed.

Kim Kyong-hui and Kim Jong Un were speculated to have led the OGD following Kim Jong Il's death. Ri Man-gon was dismissed in February 2020 by the Politburo from his position as WPK Vice-Chairman, and likely as OGD Director as well. This was due to, according to the North Korean Central News Agency, an abuse of power and corruption scandal in the WPK. Former premier Kim Jae-ryong was appointed to lead the OGD in 2020. but was sacked in 2026 following a corruption scandal that broke out, involving Pak Hui-chol of the General Political Bureau of the Korean People's Army, as a result of which Jo Yong-won was again appointed to lead the department.

First deputy directors (as of 2020)

- General Kim Kyong-ok: An OGD Deputy Director since 2007 and KWP Deputy Director since 1991, General Kim is deeply involved in the party and the Kim Regime. Kim Jong Un's security is his responsibility. Having no formal military training, General Kim was appointed general in 2010 in an effort to put civilian leadership at the head of the army. General Kim seems to be trusted by Kim Jong Un, accompanying Kim Jong Un on many of his public inspections. In 2016 he was sanctioned by the U.S. Treasury (OFAC).
- General Ri Byong-chol: He has served for over four decades in the KPA, rising up the ranks to four star general in 2010. In addition to his position as OGD First Deputy Director, he is also a deputy director at the KWP Munitions Industry Department which is responsible for all weapons development in North Korea. Thus, he plays an active part in overseeing the research and production of weapons of mass destruction as well as making decisions regarding personnel in the military and weapons programs. General Ri has both military and senior Party experience, and is a trusted advisor to Kim Jong Un, especially in times of crisis. In 2017 he was sanctioned by the U.S. Treasury (OFAC).
- Kim Jo-guk: Kim Jo-guk surfaced in 2019 as a OGD First Deputy Director. He is reportedly responsible for military affairs.

Deputy directors (as of 2020)

- Hwang Pyong-so: Fired from the General Political Bureau in 2017 for corruption, Hwang was retained as OGD Vice-Director after three months of "Revolutionary Rehabilitation". Despite a lack of formal military training, he has significant influence over the military and frequently accompanies Kim Jong Un on military related visits. In 2017 Hwang was sanctioned by the U.S. Treasury (OFAC).
- Jo Yong-won: In 2014 Jo Yong-won began appearing on the political scene, attending senior level meetings, advising Kim Jong Un, and accompanying Kim Jong Un to inspections. He is believed to be Kim Jong Un's Personal Action Officer within the OGD. In 2017 he was sanctioned by the U.S. Treasury (OFAC).
- Min Byong-chol: He is head of the OGD Inspection Section, one of the most feared institutions for its power to investigate any individual and send reports to the Supreme Leader. In 2017 he was sanctioned by the U.S. Treasury (OFAC).
- Kim Yo-jong: As the sister of Kim Jong Un, Kim Yo-jong is often thought to be a deputy director of the OGD, although there is no official confirmation. In 2017 she was sanctioned by the U.S. Treasury (OFAC).

=== Directors ===
- Kim Il Sung (1948–1952), head of the Organizing Committee
- Pak Yong-bin (1952–1959), head of the Organization Department
- Kim Yong-ju (1959–1974), head of the Organization and Guidance Department
- Kim Jong Il (1974–1992), head of the Organization and Guidance Department
- Yun Sung-gwan (1992–1993)
- Kim Jong Il (1994–2011)
- Choe Ryong-hae (2017–2019)
- Ri Man-gon (2019–2020)
- Kim Jae-ryong (2020–present)

=== Past deputy directors ===
- Ho Ka-i
- Ri Je-gang
- Ri Yong-chol
- Yom Ki-sun
- Mun Song-sol
- Ri Tong-hui
- Pak Jong-sun
- Hong Song-ryong
- Ko Hak-gyom
- Mun Myong-on
- Kim Su-yong
- Pak Kyong-son
- Ri Man-gon
- Jo Yon-jun

== Structure ==
The OGD is the largest department under the WPK Political Bureau, with a personnel of 1,000 and an estimated 25 deputy directors employed in its central sections, and all report to the office of the general secretary. Sections under the OGD often overlap with other organizations within the party. This ensures security in the WPK and the OGD's power across the WPK. Due to the OGD's level of secrecy, it is difficult to track the various offices and sections, which are often referred to by slightly different names. Below is a list of known sections under the OGD.

=== Sections ===
- Party Headquarters Committee: guides all party elements. This entails training all party members (excepting the Supreme Leader) and overseeing surveillance of WPK Central Committee workers and their families. Members work in the various elements of the WPK Politburo, including the Propaganda and Agitation Department, Party Registration, reports section, and the finance section among others.
- Party Life Guidance Section: responsible for guiding party life of every North Korean citizen, working in the military, law enforcement, party elements, and local levels throughout the general population. Guidance from the PLGS is disseminated to every organization, ensuring it is able to monitor and control the general public's adherence to it whenever they are released. It was referred to as the eyes, ears and heart of the WPK by Kim Jong Il. Also under the PLG is the Ministry of Foreign Affairs and all foreign trade organizations.
- Military Directorate: guides party and political life of all service personnel of the Korean People's Army through control of unit leaders.
- Cadre Section: controls the selection, appointment, and dismissal of high-ranking officials as well as Supreme Leader's personal staff by gauging political loyalty. This means the Cadre Section manages and assess all activities and records of officials and their families.
- Seventh Section: formerly the Administrative Department, the Seventh Section has authority over the entire judicial system. Through embedded officers, it oversees the operations of both the Ministry of Social Security, as well as the Ministry of State Security The Seventh Section is also directly connected to North Korea's prison system, as the chain of command from individual prison camps up to the Supreme Leader must run through the Seventh Section.
- Inspection Section: the most feared institution in Korea, the Inspection Section has the power to investigate any person in any organization. The OGD's ability to dismiss officials stems from the Inspection Section. While it works in conjunction with the PLG to investigate N. Koreans at every level, it has the final word on all investigations.
- Personal Secretariat: responsible for the Supreme Leader's personal matters from protocol and calendar, to security, to education and family finances.
- Party Member Registration Section: handles Party registration and occupation as well as party expulsions and international dispatch.
- General Affairs Section: responsible for administrative work for the OGD
- Reports Section: collects and manages all OGD reports to centralize them to the Supreme Leader
- Petitions Section: evaluates petitions from all N. Korean citizens
- Mass Party Directorate: deploys OGD personnel to local levels to ensure adherence to guidance
- Section 65: specially selects and trains women for the "Joy Brigade" in horticulture, hairdressing, and masseuse training.
- Three Revolutionary Teams Guidance Section: monitors open market activity in N. Korea
- Ten Principles of Monolithic Ideology Section: guides implementation of the TPMI
- Overseas Guidance Section: guides overseas organizations
- 8.9 Section: responsible for managing Mansudae Palace and Financial Management Department
- Treaty Section: monitors and oversees strategy for engagement in international treaties
- Office 80: monitors and oversees Kim Jong Un's bodyguard unit, the Supreme Guard Command's Unit 974.

== Human rights ==
According to the United Nations Human Rights Council, the OGD plays a role in North Korea's notorious human rights violations. Monitoring North Korea's human rights policy, although not a formal designation, falls under the responsibility of the OGD, which administers and guides North Korea's policy of human rights denial. The OGD's control over Party life through Organization Departments at a local level allows it to record and punish any North Korean who does not adhere to policy. North Koreans can be removed from positions of power, receive reeducation, or in severe cases be denied access to the food and medical systems or even send citizens to prison or labor camps.

=== Sanctions ===
In 2017 United Nations (UN) Security Council sanctioned the OGD as well as key leadership: Min Byong-chol (OGD Deputy Director as of 2020), Jo Yon-jun (former OGD Deputy Director), Kim Kyong-ok (OGD First Director as of 2020), and Jo Yong-won (deputy director as of 2020).

In 2016 the United States put North Korean human rights on its agenda, with the US Treasury placing sanctions on the OGD itself as well as Jo Yon-jun, Kim Kyong-ok and several other members of North Korean leadership who were added to the Office of Foreign Assets Control Specially Designated Nationals List (OFAC SDN) for human rights abuses. Later in 2017, Min Byong-chol, Jo Yong-won, and Kim Yo-jong were added to the OFAC SDN list for human rights abuses as well.

South Korea sanctioned Hwang Pyong-so (OGD Deputy Director as of 2020) in 2016 and implemented the above-mentioned UN sanctions.

In 2017, the United Kingdom put its own additional sanctions on the OGD and the same individuals.

== Future viability ==
The stability of the Mount Paektu bloodline depends on the party obligations that are largely created and enforced by the OGD, according to the Korean Institute for National Unification. Thus, the OGD is integral to the regime's survival. As assessed by Robert Collins, former Chief of Strategy at R.O.K.- U.S. Combined Forces Command, there are external threats that could put strain on the OGD such as a manmade or natural disaster, or rebellion or war. Internal corruption, competition, and stress due to the OGD's wide responsibility also have potential to strain the OGD.

== See also ==
- Politics of North Korea
- Propaganda and Agitation Department
- Sanctions against North Korea
