= Military Security Command of the Korean People's Army =

Military Security Command
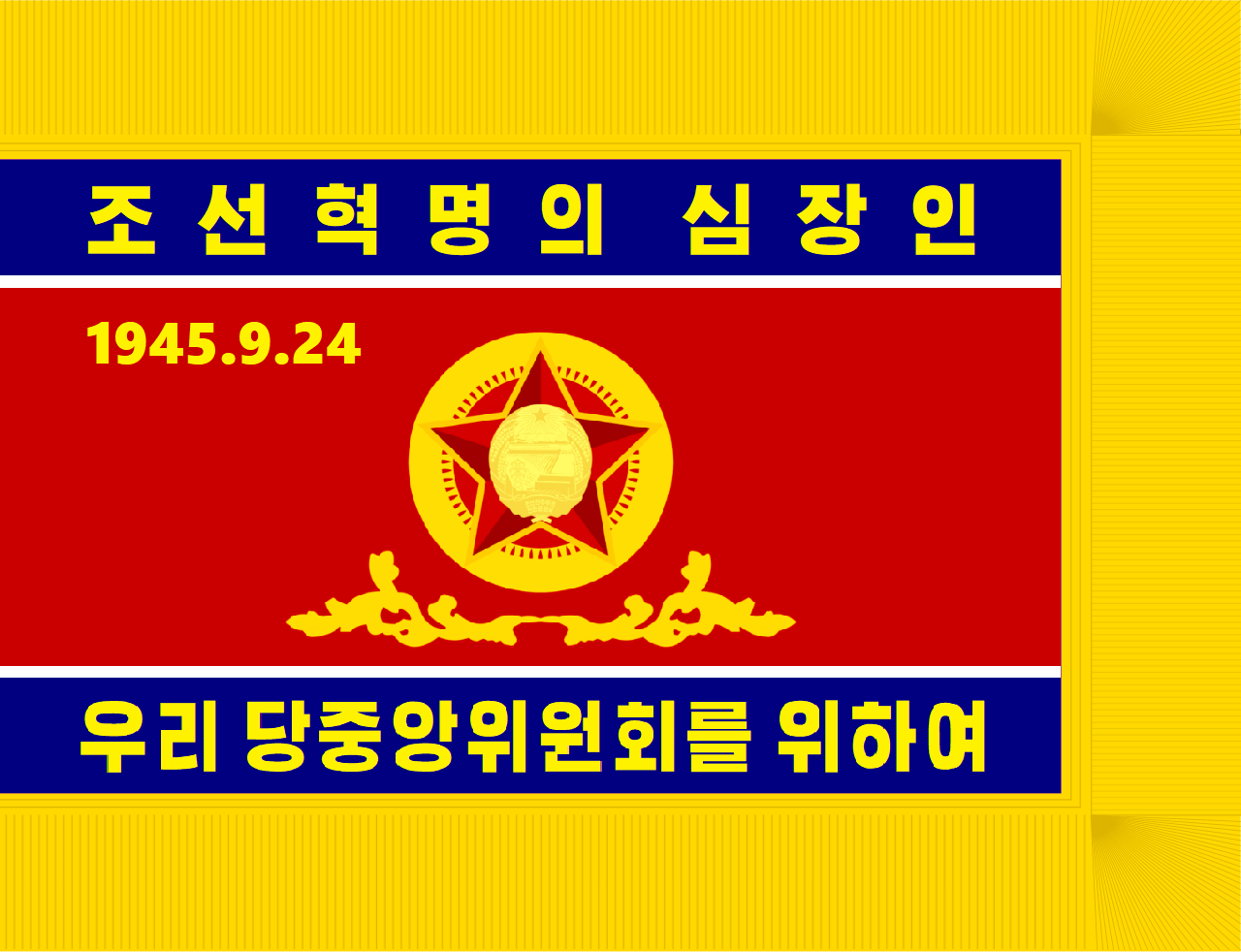
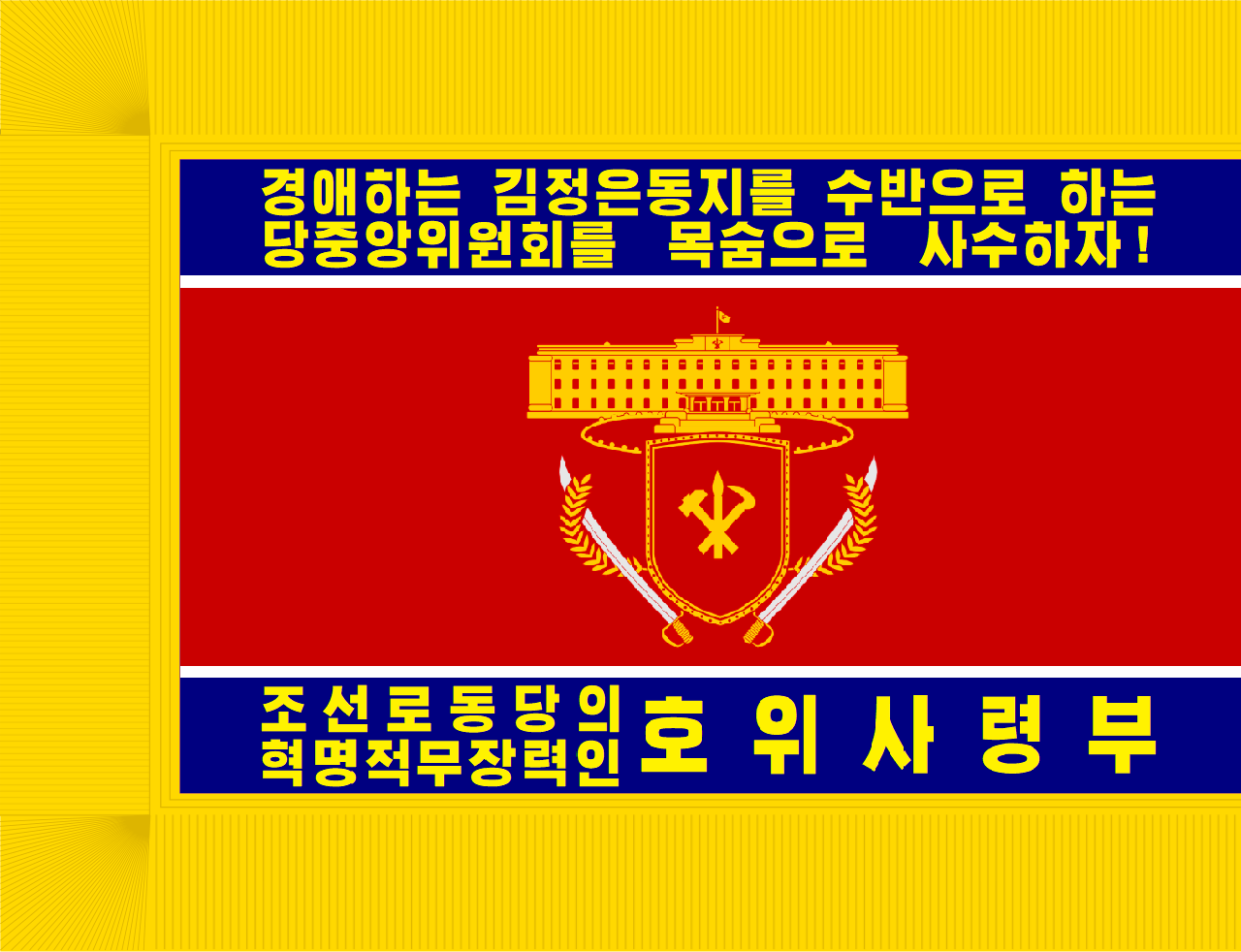
- Active: 1948–present
- Country: North Korea
- Allegiance: Kim Jong-un
- Type: Counterintelligence unit
- Role: Counterintelligence and security information in the Korean People's Army
- Size: Classified
- Part of: Korean People's Army
- Headquarters: Pyongyang
- Patron: Supreme Commander of the Korean People's Army
- March: Song of the Korean People's Army
- Engagements: Korean War

Commanders
- Commander: Om Ju-ho

Military Security Command of the Korean People's Army (Korean: 보위사령부) is the principal Counterintelligence agency of the Korean People's Army. As an abbreviation in Korean, it is also called as a guardian (bowi) (보위 사). The headquarters of the Military Security Command is in Longbuk-dong, Oseong area, Pyongyang. Its headquarters borders the Pyongyang University of Foreign Languages across a wall. In addition, several independent offices have been established in Pyongyang as branch offices.

== History ==
When the People's Army was founded in February 1948, Military Security Command origins traces its history to the 'safety agency' (Korean: 안전기관) created by the anti-terrorism organization. During the Korean War, the safety agency worked to find out spies and anti-revolutionary and reactionary elements in the People's Army. The safety agency caught the attention of Kim Il-sung when he captured the military coups in 56 and 68 and purged Kim Chang-bong and Ho Bong-hak. As a result, the safety agency became independent of the National Security Agency (now the National Security Agency) and became a political security agency that independently functions as a counter-attack. In 70, the Political Safety Agency changed its name to the National Security Agency, and in 1996, it was promoted to the National Security Agency again.

The leader of the organization from the late 60s to the mid 70s was Thae Byong-ryol, the first generation of revolution (later served as the chief of the Korean War and the Memorial Hall for the Liberation of Korea). Until the mid-80s, General Han Young-ok (88 years old, former chief commissioner of the National Military Commission) took over, and after Lieutenant General Nam Nam-sun, Captain Won Woong-hee (former political officer of the Air Force and Anti-Air Command) from 1989 to the present, is the commander of the Military Security Command. Military Security Command remained under the State Security Department until 1995, but in December of that year, it absorbed the border guards under the National Security Agency and expanded and reorganized it into the Military Security Command.

== Overview ==
While in most Communist countries, political officers were in charge of monitoring the inside of the military, but in North Korea, a guard station has been established separately. Comparing the duties of the military politics departments such as the General Political Affairs Bureau and the guard headquarters, the political departments mainly focus on publicity and incitement, while focusing on everyday partyness and loyalty evaluation. The Military Security Command place more emphasis on secret surveillance such as wiretapping. In addition, while the political department does not handle the tasks related to actual investigation / arrest, the guard headquarters also performs the role of investigation / arrest.

The guard headquarters is set up in the form of a bureau directly under the Ministry of Defense, and the Military Security Command commander has a similar position to the Director of General Political Bureau, the Chief of General Staff, the Reconnaissance General Bureau and the General Logistics Department. In the past, it seems that it was called by the names of the Political Security Bureau, the Political Security and Conservation Bureau and the Political Safety and Conservation Bureau.

== Commanders ==
- Won Ung-hui (1992–2003)
- Kim Won-hong (2003–2009)
- Jo Kyong-chol (2009–2025)
- Om Ju-ho (2026-present)
