= Lee Hwa-ja =

Korean singer (1916–1950)

Lee Hwa-ja 이화자
- Born: Lee Soon-jae (이순재); 1916; Incheon, Korea, Empire of Japan
- Died: 1950 (aged 33–34) Jongno District, Seoul, South Korea
- Genres: Trot; Sin-minyo (New Folk Song); Jazz; Japga; Folk
- Occupations: Singer; entertainer; hostess
- Years active: 1936–1950
- Labels: New Korea Records; Polydor; Okeh

Lee Hwa-ja (Korean: 이화자; Hanja: 李花子; 1916–1950), born Lee Soon-jae, was a pioneering Korean singer and cultural icon during the Japanese colonial period. Known as the "Queen of Folk Songs," she rose from the lowest social strata to become one of the most successful recording artists of the 1930s and 1940s. She is historically significant as a founding member of the Jeogori Sisters, the first girl group on the Korean Peninsula, and is cited as a foundational figure in the evolution of Trot and modern K-pop.

== Early life and education ==
Lee Hwa-ja was born around 1916 in Incheon-bu, Gyeonggi Province (modern-day Incheon Metropolitan City). Born into extreme poverty, little is known about her family except that she was entrusted to a tavern to live as a dependent after graduating from elementary school.

Lee visited the Gwonbeon in Yong-dong, Jung-gu, Incheon, to become a gisaeng. She was only 14 years old and she changed her name to Lee Hwa-ja and began a relationship with Gwang-su, a writer, and spent three years receiving lessons required of a gisaeng.

Unlike many of her contemporaries who received formal training at Gwonbeon (kisaeng schools), Lee began as an untrained barmaid. By 1935, she was singing for patrons at taverns in Bupyeong. Rumors of her exceptional talent reached Seoul, catching the attention of composer Kim Yong-hwan (pen name Kim Young-pa). Upon their first meeting, Kim described her as a raw, unpolished talent who defied the rigid norms of professional entertainers of the time.

== Career ==
Lee's career was characterized by her rapid ascent through Korea's major recording labels, often involving record-breaking "scouting fees" that signaled her immense commercial value.

=== Debut and rise to fame (1936–1938) ===
Kim Yong-hwan arranged for her debut at New Korea Records in 1936. Her first recordings, "Saebommaji" and "Seomsiaksi," were released in April. However, the modern folk song "Choripdong" (The Boy in a Straw Hat) turned her into a national sensation. Crowds reportedly mobbed record stores across the country to learn the song, prompting the label to print and distribute her photos and lyrics nationwide.

Moving to Polydor Records, Lee became a specialist in Sin-minyo (new folk songs). During this period, she released hits such as "You, You, My Love" and "Swaying Willows". Critics at the magazine Samcheolli (1938) noted that her voice possessed a "bolder" and "deeper flavor" than her peers, reviving the nation's joys and sorrows under imperialist oppression.

=== Okeh Records and Jeogori Sisters (1938–1943) ===
In late 1938, she was scouted by Lee Cheol, president of Okeh Records. Her tenure there produced her most enduring works including, "A Letter to My Mother" (1939) which was labeled an "Autobiographical Song," it depicted her weeping into her skirt. It reportedly sold 100,000 copies. Later she recorded "Hwaryu Chunmong" (1940) a poignant song depicting the sorrowful life of a woman in the entertainment industry. She also recorded "The Shepherd with a Basket" (Kolmangtae Mokdong) which was a popular hit that showcased her mastery of the "Taryeong" (rhythmic folk) style.

During this time, she became a founding member of the Jeogori Sisters, recognized as the first girl group in Korean history. The ensemble included soloists like Park Hyang-rim, Lee Nan-young, and Jang Se-jeong. They blended traditional Korean identity (represented by the jeogori jacket) with modern jazz and swing harmonies, providing the historical blueprint for the modern K-pop idol system.

=== Tragic decline and Japanese songs ===
During the Pacific War, she was pressured into recording pro-Japanese "war support" songs, such as "The Wife of the Suicide Squad" and "Letter from Mudanjiang" (1942) which were hits. By the time of Liberation in 1945, her health was shattered.

== Personal life ==
Despite her professional success, Lee's personal life was defined by tragedy. A brief marriage ended in failure, and to cope with a grueling tour schedule, she developed a severe addiction to opium in the early 1940s. She spent her final years in a rented room behind the Danseongsa Theater in Seoul, living in extreme poverty.

== Death ==
Lee died alone in a cold room in 1950, at the onset of the Korean War. She was 34 years old.

== Legacy ==
Her legacy was rediscovered in the late 20th century. Approximately 130 of her songs have been identified and preserved. She is now celebrated as a "Modern Girl" icon who challenged social norms and as one of the first true superstars of the Korean peninsula. Her life and music continue to be honored through modern tribute albums and theatrical productions, such as the musical SheStars!.

== See also ==
- Music of South Korea
- Trot (music)
- Kisaeng
- Korean popular culture
