= 15th State Affairs Commission =

Government organization of North Korea

- Emblem of the SAC Chairman

22 March 2026 – Incumbent (201 days) Overview
- Type: State Affairs Commission
- Election: 1st Session of the 15th Supreme People's Assembly

Leadership
- President: Kim Jong Un
- First Vice President: Jo Yong-won
- Vice President: Pak Thae-song

Members
- Total: 14

The 15th State Affairs Commission was confirmed on March 22, 2026, during the first session of the 15th Supreme People's Assembly with Kim Jong Un elected as its president following a proposal made by Ri Il-hwan.

== Composition ==
- President
  - Kim Jong Un: General Secretary of the Workers' Party of Korea, Chairman of the Central Military Commission, Standing Member of the Political Bureau of the Central Committee of the Workers' Party of Korea, Commander-in-Chief of North Korea.
- First Vice President
  - Jo Yong-won: Chairman of the Standing Committee of the Supreme People's Assembly, Standing Member of the Political Bureau of the Central Committee of the Workers' Party of Korea
- Vice President
  - Pak Thae-song: Premier of the Cabinet, Standing Member of the politburo of the Central Committee of the Workers' Party of Korea
- Members of the Commission:
  - Kim Tok-hun: Vice Premier of the Cabinet, member of the politburo of the Central Committee of the Workers' Party of Korea.
  - Kim Jae-ryong: Secretary of the Central Committee of the Workers' Party of Korea and Head of the Organization and Guidance Department, member of the politburo.
  - Jong Kyong-thaek: Secretary of the Central Committee of the Workers' Party of Korea and Head of the Military and Political Guidance Department, Vice Chairman of the Central Military Commission of the Party, member of the politburo.
  - Ri Hi-yong: Secretary of the Central Committee of the Workers' Party of Korea and Head of the Cadre Department, Chairman of the Central Inspection Committee of the Party, member of the politburo.
  - Kim Song-nam: Secretary of the Central Committee of the Workers' Party of Korea and Director of the International Department, member of the politburo.
  - Ju Chang-il: Secretary of the Central Committee of the Workers' Party of Korea and Director of the Propaganda and Agitation Department, member of the politburo.
  - Choe Son-hui: Minister of Foreign Affairs, member of the politburo of the Central Committee of the Workers' Party of Korea.
  - No Kwang-chol: Minister of National Defense, member of the politburo of the Central Committee of the Workers' Party of Korea, member of the Party Central Military Commission, General of the Korean People's Army.
  - Ri Chang-dae: Minister of State Security, candidate member of the politburo of the Central Committee of the Workers' Party of Korea.
  - Pang Tu-sop: Minister of Social Security, candidate member of the politburo of the Central Committee of the Workers' Party of Korea, member of the Party Central Military Commission.
  - Kim Chol-won: Director General of the Supreme Prosecutors Office, candidate member of the politburo of the Central Committee of the Workers' Party of Korea, member of the Central Military Commission.
