= Kim Nung-o =

North Korean politician (born late 1960s)

Chairman of WPK North Pyongyang Provincial Committee
- In office 2016–2018
- Supreme Leader: Kim Jong Un
- Preceded by: Ri Man-gon
- Succeeded by: Mun Kyong-dok

Chairman of WPK Pyongyang Provincial Committee
- In office 2018–2020
- Supreme Leader: Kim Jong Un
- Preceded by: Kim Su-gil
- Succeeded by: Kim Yong-hwan

Personal details
- Born: Pyongyang, North Korea
- Party: Workers' Party of Korea
- Education: Kim Il Sung University

- Kim Nung-o
- Hangul: 김능오
- Hanja: 金能五
- RR: Gim Neungo
- MR: Kim Nŭngo

Kim Nung-o (김능오, born in the late 1960s) is a North Korean politician. He is the chairman of the Workers' Party of Korea (WPK) Party Committee of Pyongyang. Kim is also a full member of the Central Committee of the WPK and an alternate member of its Politburo.

== Career ==
Kim Nung-o was born in the late 1960s. He was educated at Kim Il Sung University.

Kim has worked at various departments of the Central Committee of the Workers' Party of Korea (WPK), being a vice director of the Finance and Accounting Department in 2013. He was first mentioned by North Korean media on 1 November 2014 when he was accompanying Kim Jong Un on a guidance tour of Pyongyang International Airport. Kim Nung-o became the chief secretary of the Party Committee of North Pyongan Province in December 2015, replacing Ri Man-gon. He subsequently become the chairman of the Party Committee. He now serves as the chairman of the Party Committee of the capital Pyongyang.

Kim became a full member of the Central Committee and an alternate member of the Politburo of the WPK at the 7th Congress of the WPK in May 2016. In January 2019, Kim gave a speech at a mass rally at Kim Il Sung Square in Pyongyang, praising Kim Jong Un's New Year Address and urging inhabitants of the city to increase efforts to attain a self-reliant socialist economy.

== See also ==
- Politics of North Korea

Party political offices
Preceded by Ri Man-gon	Chairman of WPK North Pyongyan Provincial Committee; 2016–2018	Succeeded by Mun Kyong-dok
Preceded by Kim Su-gil	Chairman of WPK Pyongyang Provincial Committee; 2018–2020	Succeeded by Kim Yong-hwan
