= U Sang-chol =

North Korean politician

Member of the Politburo of the WPK Central Committee
- President: Kim Jong Un

Prosecutor General of the DPRK
- In office January 2021 – December 2023
- Leader: Kim Jong Un
- Preceded by: Kim Myong-gil
- Succeeded by: Kim Chol-won

Personal details
- Born: North Korea
- Citizenship: North Korean
- Party: Workers' Party of Korea

Korean name
- Hangul: 우상철
- RR: U Sangcheol
- MR: U Sangch'ŏl

U Sang-chol (Korean: 우상철) is a North Korean politician and jurist. He served as the director of the Central Prosecutor's Office, a member of the Legislative Committee of the Supreme People's Assembly, a candidate (alternate) member of the Political Bureau of the Central Committee of the Workers' Party of Korea, and a member of the Central Auditing Commission of the Workers' Party of Korea.

== Biography ==
At the 8th Congress of the Workers' Party of Korea held from January 5, 2021, he was elected as a member of the Central Committee of the Workers' Party of Korea and the Central Auditing Commission of the Workers' Party of Korea, held on January 17. At the 4th Session of the 14th convocation of the Supreme People's Assembly, he was appointed Chief of the Central Prosecutor's Office. At the 4th day meeting of the 3rd plenary meeting of the 8th Central Committee of the Workers' Party of Korea held on June 18 of the same year, he was elected by-election as a candidate for the 8th political bureau of the Central Committee of the Workers' Party of Korea. At the 2nd day session of the 14th 5th session of the Supreme People's Assembly held on September 29 of the same year, he was elected by-election as a member of the Legislative Committee of the Supreme People's Assembly.

During a meeting taking place to discuss measures to prevent the spread of new COVID-19 pandemic in North Korea as well as supply of medicines against infections at the Political Bureau Emergency Council of the Central Committee of the Workers' Party of Korea held on May 15, 2022, he was scolded by Kim Jong Un.
