= Park Hyang-rim =

South Korean singer (1921–1946)

Park Hyang-rim 박향림
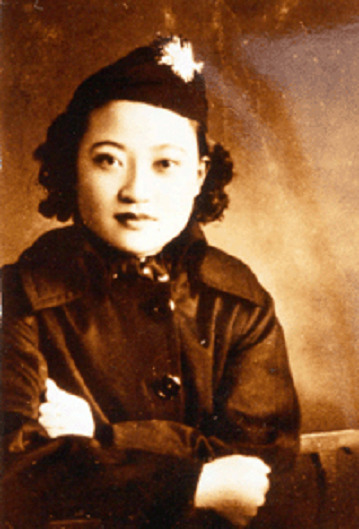
- Park as a "Modern Girl" icon, c. 1938.

Background information
- Born: Park Eok-byeol (박억별); January 31, 1921; Gyeongseong-gun, North Hamgyong Province, Japanese Korea
- Died: July 8, 1946 (aged 25) Hongcheon-gun, Gangwon Province, USAMGIK
- Genres: Trot; Manyo; Jazz; Blues
- Occupations: Singer; performer
- Instrument: Vocals
- Years active: 1937–1946
- Labels: Taepyeong; Columbia Records; Okeh
- Formerly of: Jeogori Sisters
- Children: 1

Park Hyang-rim (Korean: 박향림; Hanja: 朴響林; January 31, 1921 – July 8, 1946), born Park Eok-byeol, was a pioneering South Korean singer and performer who rose to national stardom during the Japanese colonial period. Known as the "Queen of Manyo", she was a central figure in the "Modern Girl" (Modon-gol) movement and a founding member of Korea's first girl group, the Jeogori Sisters. Her career was defined by her unique "mysterious nasal" vocal technique and her ability to blend traditional Korean sentiments with urban jazz and swing.

== Early life ==
Park was born in 1921 in Gyeongseong-gun, North Hamgyong Province (modern-day North Korea). She was raised in a relatively wealthy environment near the Jueul Hot Springs, where her mother operated a restaurant. She attended Lucy Girls' High School in Wonsan. In 1937, driven by a desire to become a professional singer, she moved to Seoul.

== Career ==
=== Debut and rise to fame ===
Park initially sought an audition with Okeh Records, but was famously rejected by its president, Lee Cheol. Undeterred, she debuted at Taepyeong Records in 1937 under the stage name Park Jung-rim with the song "Youth Theater".

In 1938, she moved to Columbia Records, where her popularity exploded. It was during this period that she recorded her signature hit, "My Brother is a Street Musician" (Oppaneun Punggakjaengi). The song, which satirized a lazy brother from a sister’s perspective, became a masterpiece of the Manyo genre (comic/satirical songs).

=== The "Queen of Manyo" and scouting to Okeh ===
As her fame grew, Lee Cheol—who had previously rejected her—reportedly paid a record-breaking transfer fee to scout her for Okeh Records. At Okeh, she transitioned from purely comic songs to sophisticated "urban" melodies. Her first release for the label, "Cosmos Lament" (1939), showcased a more sentimental and technical vocal style, cementing her status as a top-tier diva alongside Lee Nan-young and Jang Se-jeong.

=== The Jeogori Sisters ===
In 1939, Park became a founding member of the Jeogori Sisters, widely recognized as the first K-pop girl group. Alongside Lee Nan-young, Jang Se-jeong, and Lee Hwa-ja, the group performed across the Korean Peninsula and Japan. They were known for their modern interpretations of traditional hanbok and their harmonized vocal performances.

=== Censorship and defiance ===
During the final years of the colonial era, Park faced severe pressure from the Japanese authorities. She was briefly banned from performing after she defied orders to sing exclusively in the Japanese language for radio broadcasts and public concerts. Park was deeply proud of her Korean heritage and insisted on singing in her mother tongue to preserve Korean culture.

The ban was eventually lifted due to a massive public outcry. Her popularity was so great that both Korean and Japanese fans protested the decision, forcing the authorities to allow her back on stage. Even during the period she was officially "banned," she reportedly continued to perform in smaller venues, showing a complete lack of concern for the "blade of the imperialists".

=== Postpartum performance and collapse ===
Following the liberation of Korea in 1945, Park was a passionate supporter of independence, performing at radio stations and public festivals to celebrate the new nation. In early 1946, while an exclusive member of with the Mugunghwa Opera Troupe, she married and gave birth. Driven by intense professional pressure and a sense of duty to celebrate the nation's new freedom, she returned to the stage Mugunghwa Opera Troupe almost immediately after childbirth almost immediately.

Witnesses noted she performed tirelessly, attempting to hide her postpartum swelling and physical fatigue. During a grueling provincial tour in Hongcheon, Gangwon Province, Park collapsed mid-performance. She was rushed to a hospital with a fever exceeding 39°C.

== Personal life ==
Park was known for her fiercely independent and outspoken personality, which mirrored her "Modern Girl" image. In early 1946, following the liberation of Korea, she married and quickly became pregnant. Because she spent much of her life traveling with musical troupes like the Wakasa Opera Troupe and Yewonza, her life was often described as being like a "rootless weed," moving from city to city to perform.

Her personal life left a mysterious legacy; decades after her death, a monk identified himself in a magazine interview as Park's son. Having never known his mother due to her death days after his birth, his heart-wrenching account of longing for her added a deeply human dimension to her public legend.

== Death ==
Due to the unsanitary conditions of the provincial tour and the lack of antibiotics at the time, the diagnosis of puerperal fever (postpartum sepsis) came too late. During her hospitalization, fans reportedly flooded the facility with flowers and letters. She never rose from her sickbed, succumbing to the infection in July 1946 at the age of 25. Her death is often cited as a tragic example of the extreme pressures placed on female performers of that era.

== Artistry and image ==
=== The "Modern Girl" Icon ===
Park was a prominent fashion icon and cover model for magazines like Samcheolli. Characterized by her bobbed hair (tanbal) and Western dresses, she represented the Modern Girl archetype—independent, outspoken, and urban. Reporters of the era dubbed her the "Trend Changer of Korea" for her defiant public persona and her refusal to conform to passive traditional roles.

=== Vocal skill ===
Modern vocal experts cite Park's technique as exceptionally difficult. She utilized a "mysterious nasal sound" and a precise, sharp delivery influenced by her northern Hamgyong accent. Her ability to navigate jazz, blues, and trot with equal proficiency made her a unique musical force.

== Legacy ==
=== The Love Than Love Memorial ===
Park's death plunged the music industry into shock. In July 1946, a massive memorial concert titled Love Than Love was held at the Dongyang Theater in Seoul. A "sea of tears" was reported as fans and peers, including Lee Nan-young, Jang Se-jeong, and Lee Hwa-ja, gathered. Lyricist Park Young-ho delivered a sorrowful eulogy, lamenting the loss of a talent in the prime of her youth.

=== Historical rediscovery ===
While she was briefly labeled a pro-Japanese collaborator due to militaristic songs recorded under duress (such as "Blood Oath Support"), modern historians have nuanced this view. Her refusal to sing in Japanese for radio broadcasts and her dedication to performing for a liberated Korea have solidified her reputation as a cultural patriot.

In the late 20th century, her complete discography was identified and preserved. Her life continues to be celebrated in modern media. Her story is a central focus of the musical SheStars!, which pays tribute to the original girl groups. Decades after her death, a popular magazine published an interview with a monk who identified as Park's son, whose birth had preceded her death. His story added a poignant, human dimension to the "Queen of Manyo's" tragic end.

== See also ==
- Trot (music)
- Modern Girl
- Lee Nan-young
- Korean popular culture
