= Ri Je-gang =

North Korean politician (1930–2010)

- Portrait of Ri Je-gang

First Deputy Director of the Organization and Guidance Department
- In office 1999–2010
- Supreme Leader: Kim Jong-il

Deputy Director of the Organization and Guidance Department
- In office 1982–1999
- Supreme Leader: Kim Jong-il

Personal details
- Born: 1930
- Died: 2 June 2010 (aged 79–80) Pyongyang
- Citizenship: North Korean
- Party: Workers' Party of Korea
- Education: Kim Il-sung University

- Ri Je-gang
- Hangul: 리제강
- Hanja: 李濟剛
- RR: Ri Jegang
- MR: Ri Chegang

Ri Je-gang (1930 – 2 June 2010) was a North Korean politician.

== Career ==
Ri studied at Kim Il Sung University. He was elevated to the Central Committee of the Workers' Party of Korea (WPK) in 1973 as head of the Organization and Guidance Department (OGD); Kim Jong Il's takeover of the bureau later that year set the stage for his friendship with Ri. He became a deputy chief of the same bureau as well as Kim's personal secretary in 1982; he was elevated to first deputy chief in 1999. He had a long rivalry with Jang Sung-taek.

Ri reportedly directed many of the purges of senior government officials which took place during Kim Jong Il's reign. Ri reportedly imposed capital punishment on many of those purged, in spite of recommendations from his subordinates for lesser punishments such as reeducation.

== Death ==
Ri died due to injuries sustained in a car crash; there were different theories about the cause, including speculation that it may have been foul play. In particular, Andrei Lankov of Kookmin University called the death suspicious, pointing to the lack of traffic in North Korea, and described the death as "part of a long tradition" of politicians being killed in mysterious traffic incidents. In contrast, North Korea analyst Lee Sang-hyun of the Sejong Institute suspected a more innocent explanation, that Ri may have been driving under the influence of alcohol after returning from a party held by Kim Jong Il, and found himself unable to control his vehicle on poorly lit and poorly maintained roads.
