= Won Ung-hui =

North Korean politician and military officer

Personal details
- Born: 1939 Korea, Empire of Japan
- Died: May 15, 2004 (aged 64–65)
- Citizenship: North Korean
- Party: Workers' Party of Korea
- Occupation: Military officer

Military service
- Allegiance: North Korea
- Branch/service: Korean People's Army
- Rank: General

Won Ung-hui (Korean: 원응희; 1939 – May 15, 2004) was a North Korean politician and military officer, served as commander of the Military Security Command of the Korean People's Army. He was a member of the Central Committee of the Workers' Party of Korea, and member of the Supreme People's Assembly. He held the rank of General.

== Biography ==
Won Ung-hui became major general of the Korean People's Army in 1983. Five years later, he was elected to the alternate member of the Party Central Committee. In the election to the 9th convocation of the Supreme People's Assembly in 1990, he was elected as a member for the first time and served as a political member of the Air Force Command. At the same time, he was promoted to lieutenant general and minister of the People's Armed Forces. The following year, he was promoted to general and member of the Central Committee of the WPK. In 1992, he was appointed as the commander of the Military Security Command of the Korean People's Army. In July 1994, he was awarded the rank of general and following the death of Kim Il Sung he was member of his funeral committee.

In December 1995, Won Ung-hui was appointed commander of the Defense Command of the Ministry of People's Armed Forces. A year later, a coup d’état of the VI Corps, which wanted to overthrow Kim Jong Il, broke out. After receiving information, Kim Jong Il's Supreme Guard Command successfully suppressed the attempted coup. Since then, the Military Security Command led by Won Ung-hui has lost momentum. At the same time, even though Won Ung-hui was successfully re-elected in the election for the 10th convocation of the Supreme People's Assembly, he has been neglected by Kim Jong Il. In 2003, Won Ung-hui retired and died on May 15, 2004, of liver cancer.

Military offices
Preceded by ?	Commander of the Military Security Command; 1992–2003	Succeeded by Kim Won-hong
