= Jang Se-jeong =

South Korean singer (1921–2003)

Jang Se-jeong 장세정
- Also known as: Zhang Xian (張仙); Queen of Lyric Songs; Diva of Pyongyang
- Born: Jang Se-jeong; May 28, 1921; Pyongyang, Korea, Empire of Japan
- Died: February 16, 2003 (aged 81) Los Angeles, California, U.S.
- Genres: Trot; Semi-classical; Mambo; Jazz
- Occupations: Singer; model; musical theater actress
- Instrument: Vocals
- Years active: 1935–1988
- Labels: Okeh Records; Orient Records
- Spouse: Han Doo-shik (m. 1946)
- Children: 4

Jang Se-jeong (Korean: 장세정; Hanja: 張世貞; May 28, 1921 – February 16, 2003) was a popular South Korean singer and a pioneer of the musical theater stage. Known as the "Queen of Lyric Songs" and the "Diva of Pyongyang," she was a founding member of the Jeogori Sisters, Korea's first female vocal group. Her career spanned the Japanese colonial period, the post-liberation era, and the Korean War, leaving behind a legacy of over 800 recordings. She is best known for her 1937 masterpiece, "The Ferryboat Departs" (Yeonrakseoneun Tteonanda).

== Early life and education ==
Jang was born in Pyongyang, South Pyongan Province. Her upbringing was marked by tragedy; her mother died when she was only two months old, and her father fled to Manchuria to join the Korean Independence Corps (Kwangbokgun). Raised by her grandparents, she worked at the Hwashin Department Store's instrument shop in Pyongyang, which served as her informal musical education.

In 1936, at age 15, she won first prize in a singing competition commemorating the opening of the Pyongyang Broadcasting Station (JBBK). Lee Cheol, the president of Okeh Records, scouted her immediately, recognizing a voice that combined "innocent sensuality" with technical power.

== Career ==
=== Colonial Era Stardom (1937–1945) ===
Jang debuted in early 1937 with "The Ferryboat Departs". It was a historic success, selling over 50,000 copies. At a time when Koreans were displaced by colonial policy, the song's harbor-based imagery—specifically the Gwanbu Ferry—became a metaphor for national mourning. Her voice was praised for its "deep yet refreshing" quality, distinct from the thinner vocal styles common at the time.

=== Cultural Impact in China (Zhang Xian) ===
Jang Se-jeong was a rare pan-Asian star. In the late 1930s and 1940s, she was active in Shanghai, releasing records under the name Zhang Xian (張仙). She was a fixture in the Shanghai entertainment circuit, performing at venues like the Paramount Ballroom. Her "semi-classical" style blended seamlessly with the emerging Mandopop (Shidaiqu) of the era.

As a lead member of the Manchuria Pioneer Village Comfort Entertainment Troupe, she performed for both Korean expats and Chinese locals. Her popularity in the "North" made her a bridge between the musical cultures of the Korean peninsula and mainland China.

=== Modern Girl ===
Jang became a symbol of the "Modern Girl" (Modeon Geol) movement. She defied social norms by adopting Western fashion, including the curly bob cut (danbal), short skirts, eyeshadow, and high heels. Reporters dubbed her the "Flapper Girl" for her defiant public persona and her refusal to conform to traditional passive roles.

=== The Jeogori Sisters ===
Alongside Lee Nan-young, Park Hyang-rim, and Lee Hwa-ja, Jang formed the Jeogori Sisters, Korea's first girl group. As the prima donna of the Joseon Musical Troupe, she toured extensively through Korea, Japan, and Manchuria.

=== Post-Liberation and Musical Theater ===
After the 1945 liberation, Jang joined the KPK Musical Troupe, led by jazz master Kim Hae-song. She became a pioneer of musical theater, starring in localized versions of Carmen and La Traviata. In 1948, she released "Cry, Silver Bell," an upbeat anthem celebrating national independence.

In the 1960s, following the normalization of Korea-Japan relations, she performed in Japan and she studied vocal training and music in Japan.

=== Wartime in Daegu ===
During the Korean War, Jang evacuated to Daegu. Under Orient Records, she released "San Francisco" (1953) and "Hometown Grass" (Gohyangcho). While "Hometown Grass" was originally a Song Min-do track, Jang's version became the definitive wartime anthem, capturing the sociological sorrow of displaced farmers and refugees.

=== Later years ===
In the 1970s, Jang's career was hindered by government censorship. Many of her hits were banned because their creators (such as Jo Myeong-am) had defected to North Korea. Branded as a "pro-Japanese singer" for militaristic songs she was forced to record in 1941, and facing a shrinking stage, she immigrated to the United States in 1973.

Settling in Los Angeles, she suffered a stroke in 1979 that left her wheelchair-bound and with aphasia. In 1988, she made a final appearance on the Gayo Stage (Golden Oldies) in LA. Though she could not speak clearly, her presence brought fellow performers and the audience to tears.

== Personal life ==
In 1946, Jang married musician Han Doo-shik, with whom she had three sons and one daughter: Han Young, Han Ung, Han Se-ran, and Han Seong. She moved to the United States in 1973 to escape the narrowing social standing she faced due to the banning of her songs. For decades, a persistent rumor claimed that Jang was the lover of Okeh Records president Lee Cheol and had fathered children with him. Modern historians and family records have identified these as erroneous and distorted rumors; Lee Cheol's wife was historically confirmed to be the actress and dancer Hyun Song-ja.

== Death ==
She suffered a stroke in 1979 that left her wheelchair-bound. In 1988, she made a legendary final appearance on the Gayo Stage in Los Angeles, which brought the Korean diaspora to tears. She died on February 16, 2003, in Los Angeles at the age of 81. She is interred at Forest Lawn Memorial Park (Hollywood Hills).

== Artistry and Image ==
=== The "Modern Girl" Icon ===
Jang Se-jeong used her physical image as a tool for social defiance. She rejected passive traditional roles for women and encouraged the youth to embrace Western modernity. She was a prominent fashion icon for magazines like Samcheolli, and Jogwang. Her signature look included the curly bob cut (danbal), Western-style dresses, and high heels. She popularized eyeshadow and bold makeup among Korean girls. Despite facing intense backlash from traditionalists, she "didn't care" and continued to promote a lifestyle that was urban, independent, and outspoken. Reporters of the era dubbed her the "Flapper Girl" for her glamorous, defiant public presence. She was open about her life and her rejection of "traditional stuff," effectively acting as Korea's first true "influencer" who modeled a life of freedom for the next generation.

=== Vocal skill ===
Her voice was described as "innocent yet sensual" and "substantial yet refreshing". She was known for her nasal embellishments and a "coquettish" delivery that could sound like it was "drenched in fog". This allowed her to convey deep national sorrow in songs like "The Ferryboat Departs" while sounding upbeat and modern in comedic duets. Her range was immense. She could transition from the mournful, sociological weight of "Hometown Grass" to the rhythmic, jazz-influenced mambo of "San Francisco" and even satirical comic songs with Kim Jeong-gu.

== Controversies and Legacy ==
=== Pro-Japanese Allegations ===
Jang was included in the Dictionary of Pro-Japanese Collaborators (2008) due to militaristic "war songs" she was forced to record in the early 1940s, such as "Mother of the Volunteer Soldier" and "You and Me". She later testified that she and her peers were under extreme duress from Japanese authorities to record these propaganda tracks.

=== Censorship ===
Many of her greatest hits were banned in the 1970s because their writers, such as Jo Myeong-am and Kim Hae-song, had defected to North Korea. Composers like Park Si-chun fought to keep her music alive by re-recording her tracks under different credits to bypass authoritarian censorship.

== Awards and nominations ==
Name of the award ceremony, year presented, category, nominee of the award, and the result of the nomination
Award ceremony	Year	Category	Nominee / Work	Result	Ref.
Pyongyang Broadcasting Station Awards	1936	Best Singer	Jang Se-jeong	Won	

== See also ==
- Trot (music)
- Modern Girl
- Korean popular culture
