= Hwang Pyong-so =

North Korean general (born c. 1946)

- 황병서
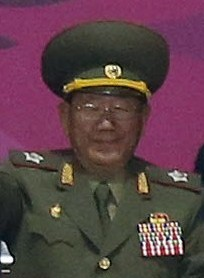
- Hwang in 2014

Vice Chairman of the Central Military Commission
- In office 11 April 2012 – 10 January 2021
- Supreme Leader: Kim Jong Un
- Preceded by: Choe Ryong-hae

Director of the General Political Bureau of the Korean People's Army
- In office 26 April 2014 – 9 February 2018
- Supreme Leader: Kim Jong Un
- Preceded by: Choe Ryong-hae
- Succeeded by: Kim Jong-gak

Vice Chairman of the State Affairs Commission
- In office 29 June 2016 – 9 February 2018
- Supreme Leader: Kim Jong Un
- Preceded by: Office established
- Succeeded by: Choe Ryong-hae

Vice Chairman of the National Defence Commission
- In office 9 April 2014 – 29 June 2016
- Supreme Leader: Kim Jong Un
- Preceded by: Choe Ryong-hae
- Succeeded by: Commission abolished

Personal details
- Born: 1946 (age 79–80)
- Party: Workers' Party of Korea

Military service
- Allegiance: North Korea
- Branch/service: Korean People's Army
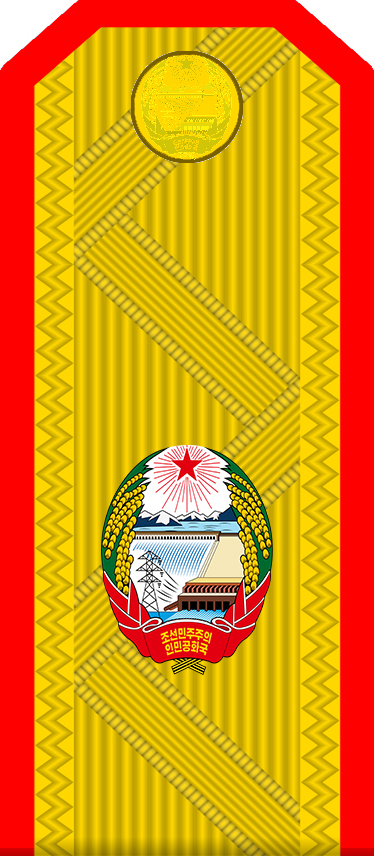
- Rank: Ch'asu (Vice Marshal)

Korean name
- Hangul: 황병서
- Hanja: 黃炳瑞; 黃炳誓
- RR: Hwang Byeongseo
- MR: Hwang Pyŏngsŏ

Hwang Pyong-so (born c. 1946 or 1949) is a North Korean general and politician who held the rank of Vice Marshal (Korean: 차수, Ch'asu) in the Korean People's Army (KPA). He was a member of the Presidium of the Workers' Party of Korea and the top-ranking vice-chairman of the State Affairs Commission.

== Biography ==
Hwang has probably spent most of his career in the Organization and Guidance Department (OGD), gaining reputation as the organization's éminence grise. In September 2010, Hwang was appointed an alternate member of the Party Central Committee, holding the position of deputy head of the OGD since the early 2000s with a military and security portfolio. In March 2014 he was elected to the Supreme People's Assembly during the 2014 SPA election; during the same month, he was identified as the first vice-director of the party organization department.

On April 28, 2014 Korean Central News Agency reported that the Central Military Commission of the Workers' Party of Korea and National Defense Commission promoted Hwang to the rank of vice marshal in the Korean People's Army on April 26. He was first seen wearing the four stars of a full general on April 15, meaning he moved up two ranks – from colonel general in a short time. In an April 27 KCNA report on an artillery drill, Hwang was referred to for the first time as a member of the party Central Military Commission. Later on May 1 he was revealed to be the new chief of the General Political Bureau of the KPA, considered the most senior position in the military after the supreme commander. On September 25 he also replaced former No. 2 Choe Ryong-hae in his last military capacity as first vice-chairman of the National Defence Commission, retaining the position as the NDC was transformed into the State Affairs Commission on 29 June 2016. On 18 February 2015 he was elevated to the top Presidium during a Politburo meeting. Hwang Pyong-so is seen as a key aide to Kim Jong Un.

Hwang is widely reported to have been a university classmate of Kim's aunt Kim Kyong-hui and reportedly maintained close ties with Kim Jong Un's mother Ko Yong Hui.

Hwang's appearance at the closing ceremony of the 2014 Asian Games in the absence of Kim Jong Un, and his subsequent trip to South Korea, led to speculation in the Western press about his role within the North Korean government.

In November 2017, according to South Korean intelligence, Hwang was facing unspecified punishment. On 9 February 2018, North Korean media confirmed that Hwang Pyong-so had been replaced by Kim Jong-gak as the Director of the General Political Bureau of the KPA. Hwang was soon rehabilitated, reappearing in public in February 2018.

In December 2018, the South Korean Ministry of Unification reported that Hwang held the post of First Vice-chairman of the Organization and Guidance Department.

== Awards and honors ==
A picture of Hwang shows him wearing the ribbons to all decorations awarded to him.

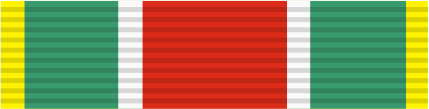

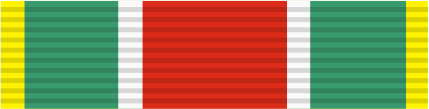

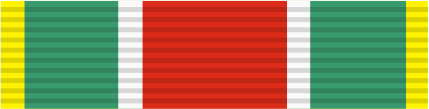

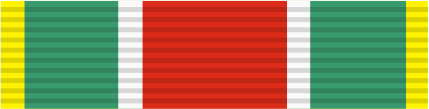

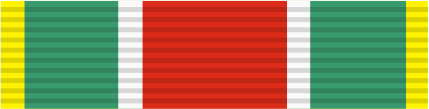

Military offices
| Preceded by Choe Ryong-hae | Director of the KPA General Political Bureau; 2014–2018 | Succeeded by Kim Jong-gak |
