= Central Public Prosecutors Office of North Korea =

Highest prosecutorial body of North Korea

Central Public Prosecutors Office
- 조선민주주의인민공화국 최고검찰소
- Supreme Public Prosecutors' Office

Agency overview
- Formed: 1948; 78 years ago
- Jurisdiction: Supreme People's Assembly
- Headquarters: Pyongyang, North Korea
- Agency executives: Prosectuor general; Kim Chol-won

Korean name
- Hangul: 조선민주주의인민공화국 최고검찰소
- Hanja: 朝鮮民主主義人民共和國 最高檢察所
- RR: Joseon minjujuui inmin gonghwaguk choego geomchalso
- MR: Chosŏn minjujuŭi inmin konghwaguk ch'oego kŏmch'also

Central Public Prosecutors Office of the DPRK (Korean: 조선민주주의인민공화국 최고검찰소), formerly known as Supreme Public Prosecutors' Office of the DPRK is the highest prosecutorial organ of the DPRK. The Central Public Prosecutors Office is accountable to the Supreme People's Assembly and is responsible for leading prosecutorial work and appointing prosecutors; the current Prosecutor General is Kim Chol-won. The Central Public Prosecutors Office of the DPRK is the highest prosecutorial organ of the Democratic People's Republic of Korea.The office comprises one Prosecutor General and several prosecutors. The Prosecutor General is appointed by the Supreme People's Assembly for a five-year term. The current Prosecutor General of the Central Public Prosecutors Office of North Korea is Kim Chol-won, who was appointed on March 23, 2026, during the first session of the 15th convocation of the Supreme People's Assembly. Although it was renamed the "Supreme Public Prosecutors Office" under the 2010 Constitution, it was renamed back to the Central Public Prosecutors Office by the 4th Session of the 13th convocation of the Supreme People's Assembly held in 2016.

== Structure ==
Prosecutors at all levels are appointed or dismissed by the Central Public Prosecutors Office. The Central Public Prosecutors Office is composed of provincial and directly-governed city public prosecutors offices, city (district) and county public prosecutors offices, and special public prosecutors offices; these lower-level offices are subordinate to the Central Public Prosecutors Office.

== Duties ==
- Lead prosecutorial work and direct lower-level public prosecutors' offices;
- appoint and dismiss prosecutors;
- Supervise whether state organs, enterprises, organizations, and citizens strictly observe state laws;
- Supervise whether the resolutions and directives of state organs conflict with the Constitution, orders and decrees of the Chairman of the State Affairs Commission of the DPRK, laws and *Resolutions of the Supreme People's Assembly, resolutions and directives of the State Affairs Commission, decrees, resolutions, and directives of the Presidium of the Supreme People's Assembly, or resolutions, administrative orders, and directives of the Cabinet;
- Expose lawbreakers and criminals and hold them legally accountable, thereby protecting the regime and socialist system of the DPRK, the property of the state, social organizations, and cooperative organizations, as well as the rights, lives, and property of the people as guaranteed by the Constitution.

== Prosecutors General ==
- Jang Hae-u: September 2, 1948 –
- Choe Yong-rim: September 1998 – September 2003
- Ri Gil-song: September 2003 – April 2010
- Jang Pyong-gyu: April 2010 – April 2017
- Kim Myong-gil: April 2017 – January 2021
- U Sang-chol: January 2021 – December 2023
- Kim Chol-won: December 2023 – Present

== See also ==
- Supreme Prosecutors' Office of the Republic of Korea
