= Kwon Yong-jin =

North Korean politician and military officer

General Kwon Yong-jin

Director of the General Political Bureau of the Korean People's Army
- In office January 2021 – 2022
- Leader: Kim Jong Un
- Preceded by: Kim Su-gil
- Succeeded by: Jong Kyong-thaek

Personal details
- Born: Unknown Pyongyang, North Korea
- Party: Workers' Party of Korea

Military service
- Allegiance: North Korea
- Branch/service: Korean People's Army
- Rank: Army General

Kwon Yong-jin (Korean: 권영진; Hanja: 權英進) is a North Korean politician and military officer. From January 2021 to 2022, he served as the director of the General Political Bureau of the Korean People's Army.

== Biography ==
Kwon Yong-jin was the director of the General Political Bureau of the Korean People's Army (KPA). He served in this post since he replaced Kim Su-gil in January 2021 until 2022. On 24 February 2021 Kwon Yong-jin alongside Minister of People's Armed Forces Kim Jong-Gwan were both promoted to the rank of Vice Marshal.

According to a KCTV video from February 6, 2022, Kwon became a General, an apparent demotion from his previous rank as a Vice Marshal.
