= Kim Su-gil =

North Korean general and politician (born 1950)

General Kim Su-gil

Chief Secretary of the Pyongyang City WPK Committee
- Incumbent
- Assumed office 1 January 2023
- General Secretary: Kim Jong Un
- Preceded by: Kim Yong-hwan
- In office April 2014 – May 2018
- Preceded by: Mun Kyong-dok
- Succeeded by: Kim Nung-o

Director of the General Political Bureau of the Korean People's Army
- In office May 2018 – January 2021
- Leader: Kim Jong Un
- Preceded by: Kim Jong-gak
- Succeeded by: Kwon Yong-jin

Personal details
- Born: 1950 (age 75–76)
- Party: Workers' Party of Korea

Military service
- Allegiance: North Korea
- Branch/service: Korean People's Army
- Rank: General

- Kim Su-gil
- Hangul: 김수길
- Hanja: 金秀吉
- RR: Gim Sugil
- MR: Kim Sugil

Kim Su-gil (김수길, born 1950) is a North Korean general and politician who has served as the Chief Secretary of the Pyongyang City WPK Committee since January 2023. He was the director of the General Political Bureau of the Korean People's Army (KPA) from when he replaced Kim Jong-gak in May 2018 until January 2021.

== Career ==
Kim Su-gil is a career soldier. In his early career, he held posts in the General Political Bureau of the Korean People's Army (KPA) and its General Staff Department. On 24 April 1992 he was promoted to the rank of sojang (Major General). On 15 April 2010 he was promoted to chungjang (Lieutenant General). In the Autumn of 2013 he was temporarily demoted to sojang again, like many other high-ranking KPA soldiers. He currently holds a rank of four-star general.

Kim became a vice director of the Ministry of People's Armed Forces in 2006. He also served as the Vice Minister of People's Armed Forces since 2010. From this post, he was involved in the purge and execution of Jang Song-thaek in December 2013.

Kim is a close aide of Kim Jong Un and often accompanies him in public functions. Kim has previously served as the Chairman of the Pyongyang City Committee of the Worker's Party from April 2014 to 2018 when he was replaced by Ri Man-gon. In this post, soon after his appointment, he issued a public apology following a building collapse in the city. He was elected to the Supreme People's Assembly (SPA) in 2009 election and again in 2014 election. Kim has served as a full member of the Central Committee of the Workers' Party of Korea and an alternate member of the Politburo of the Workers' Party of Korea since May 2016. He is also on the Central Military Commission of the Workers' Party of Korea.

Kim served on the funeral committees of Jon Pyong-ho in 2014, Ri Ul-sol and Kim Yang-gon in 2015, and Kang Sok-ju in 2016. In April 2018, Kim was elected a member of the SPA Presidium. Kim Su-gil replaced Kim Jong-gak in May 2018 as the director of the General Political Bureau of the Korean People's Army. North Korean media announced the reshuffle in May 2018, after Kim Jong-gak had served for merely four months. It is possible that the appointment took place on 17 May at a meeting of the Central Military Commission of the Workers' Party of Korea chaired by Kim Jong- Un.

At a personnel reshuffle at the First Session of the 14th Supreme People's Assembly, Kim lost his seat in the presidium but was elevated to a member of the State Affairs Commission of North Korea. On 1 January 2023, Kim was appointed as the Chief Secretary of the Pyongyang Municipal Committee of the Workers' Party of Korea and a member of the WPK Politburo. On 17 January 2023, he became a member of the Standing Committee of the Supreme People's Assembly.

Party political offices
Preceded by Mun Kyong-dok	Secretary of the Pyongyang City WPK Committee; 2014–2018	Succeeded by Kim Nung-o
Preceded by Kim Yong-hwan	Secretary of the Pyongyang City WPK Committee; 2023-	Succeeded by Incumbent
Military offices
Preceded by Kim Jong-gak	Director of the KPA General Political Bureau; 2018–2021	Succeeded by Kwon Yong-jin
