= Jo Kyong-chol =

North Korean politician (born c. 1944/1945)

General Jo Kyong-chol

Commander of the Military Security Command
- Incumbent
- Assumed office 2009
- Supreme Leader: Kim Jong Un
- Preceded by: Kim Won-hong

Personal details
- Born: North Korea
- Party: Workers' Party of Korea

Military service
- Allegiance: North Korea
- Branch/service: Korean People's Army
- Rank: General
- Commands: Military Security Command

Korean name
- Hangul: 조경철
- RR: Jo Gyeongcheol
- MR: Cho Kyŏngch'ŏl

Jo Kyong-chol (Korean: 조경철) is a North Korean politician and officer who is serving as the commander of the Military Security Command and a member of the WPK Central Military Commission.

== Biography ==
He is assumed to be born in 1944 or 1945. In 2009 he was elected as a member of the 12th convocation of the Supreme People's Assembly. He participated in the purges of officials, among them of Jang Song-thaek in 2013. In June 2022 he was promoted to a member of the Central Military Commission. He is under sanctions of the U.S. Department of the Treasury's Office of Foreign Assets Control. In 2015 he was ranked 47 in the funeral committee of Jon Pyong-ho and following the death of Kim Jong Il a member of his funeral committee.
