= Mun Kyong-dok =

- 문경덕

Chief Secretary of WPK North Pyongan Provincial Committee
- In office 10 January 2021 – 28 December 2023
- Preceded by: Himself (as Chairman)
- Succeeded by: Park Seong-cheol

Chairman of WPK North Pyongan Provincial Committee
- In office 2018 – 10 January 2021
- Preceded by: Kim Nung-o
- Succeeded by: Himself (as Secretary)

Chief Secretary of WPK Pyongyang Municipal Committee
- In office July 2010 – March 2014
- Preceded by: Choe Yong-rim
- Succeeded by: Kim Su-gil

Personal details
- Born: 12 October 1957 (age 68) Taesong-guyok, Pyongyang
- Party: Workers' Party of Korea
- Education: Kim Il Sung University

Mun Kyong-dok (Korean: 문경덕; born October 12, 1957) is a North Korean politician who served as the chief Party secretary of Pyongyang from 2010 to 2014, and the Party chief of North Pyongan Province from 2018 to 2023.

== Biography ==
Born in 1957 in Taesong-guyok, Pyongyang. In October 1973, he joined the Korean People's Army, graduated from Kim Il Sung University, and became a political economy expert. He started working with Jang Song-thaek at the Workers' Party Committee in Pyongyang in the 1970s. He worked in the Kim Il Sung Youth League in the 1980s, where he had responsibility over Red Youth Guards. He became the vice chairman of the Youth League in 1991.

Mun later transferred to the WPK Organization and Guidance Department together with Jang, where he eventually became the section chief and vice director in 1997. Mun was critical for building political loyalty for Jang, and travelled with him to a study tour in South Korea in 2002.

In July 2010, he was appointed as the chief secretary of the WPK Pyongyang Provincial Committee. He also became the Vice Chairman of the Central Committee of the Sarocheong Committee, Director of the Second Committee, and Vice Chairman of the Party Central Committee. He was elected to become a member of the WPK Central Committee and the Secretariat, as well as an alternate member of the Politburo, during the 3rd Party Conference on 28 September 2010. In 2009, he was elected to the 12th convocation of the Supreme People's Assembly (SPA).

He was member of the funeral committee following the death of Jo Myong-rok in November 2010, death of Kim Jong Il in December 2011, Kim Kuk-thae in December 2013 and Kim Yong-chun and Kim Chol-man in 2018 and Hwang Sun-hui in 2020.

After Jang's execution in 2013, Mun disappeared from the public view, stoking speculation that he was purged due to being a close acquittance of Jang. He was removed from his positions in March 2014. He reappeared in public view in 2018, however, revealing that he was appointed as the Provincial Party Chairman of the North Pyongan Province. In 2019 he was elected to the 14th convocation of the SPA representing 280th electoral district (Kujang).

Party political offices
Preceded by Choe Yong-rim	Chairman of WPK Pyongyang Provincial Committee; 2010-2014	Succeeded by Kim Su-gil
Preceded by Kim Nung-o	Chairman of WPK North Pyongan Provincial Committee; 2018	Incumbent
