= Ri Yong-sik =

North Korean politician

Member of the Central Committee of the WPK
- In office May 2016 – Incumbent
- Supreme Leader: Kim Jong Un

Chief editor of Rodong Sinmun
- In office 2014–2017
- Succeeded by: Kim Pyong-ho

Personal details
- Citizenship: North Korean
- Party: Workers' Party of Korea

Ri Yong-sik (리영식) is a North Korean politician and agitator.

== Biography ==
In 2014 he was appointed to be the Chief editor of Rodong Sinmun, the mouthpiece of the Workers' Party of Korea, replacing Kim Pyong-ho. In 2016, following the decision of the 7th Congress of the Workers' Party of Korea he was elected to the 7th Central Committee of the Workers' Party of Korea.
