= Kim Jong-gak =

North Korean military officer (born 1941)

- 김정각

Minister of People's Armed Forces
- In office 2012–2012
- Supreme Leader: Kim Jong Un
- Preceded by: Kim Yong-Chun
- Succeeded by: Kim Kyok-sik

Director of the KPA General Political Bureau
- In office 2018–2018
- Supreme Leader: Kim Jong Un
- Preceded by: Hwang Pyong-so
- Succeeded by: Kim Su-gil

Personal details
- Born: 20 July 1941 (age 85) Heian'nan Province, Korea, Empire of Japan
- Party: Workers' Party of Korea

Military service
- Allegiance: North Korea
- Branch/service: Korean People's Army
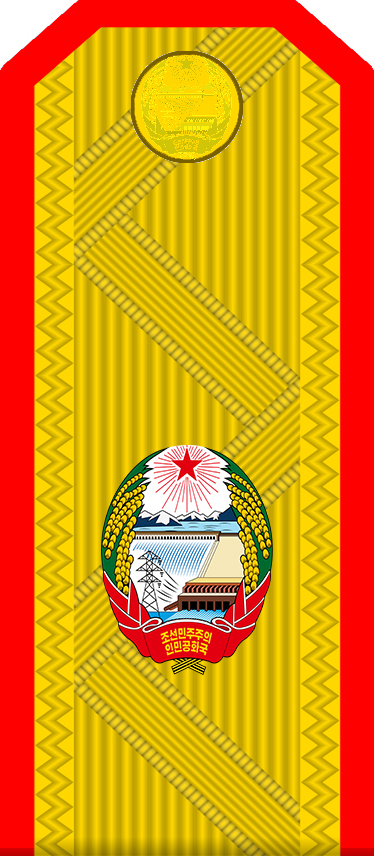
- Rank: Ch'asu (Vice Marshal)

Kim Jong-gak (Korean: 김정각; Hanja: 金正閣; born 20 July 1941) is a Korean People's Army (KPA) official. He was a member of the Politburo of the Workers' Party of Korea (WPK). He served as Minister of Defence briefly in 2012, and Director of the General Political Bureau of the KPA in 2018.

== Biography ==
Kim Jong-gak was born in Jungsan County, South Phyongan Province on 20 July 1941, and joined the Korean People's Army in August 1959. He graduated from the Kim Il Sung Military University and later served in a number of capacities such as battalion commander, deputy commander of an army corps, chief of staff and head of a training center. He joined the Party leadership in December 1991, when he was appointed an alternate member of the WPK Central Committee at the 19th Plenary Meeting of the 6th Central Committee. In 1992 his duties grew again: in April, during Kim Il Sung's 80th birthday, he was promoted to colonel-general, and in December he was appointed vice-minister of the People's Armed Forces.

Since then, Kim Jong-gak's role grew. He was appointed administrator of the KPA's parades and performances in Pyongyang, elected deputy to the Supreme People's Assembly starting from 1998, and promoted to general in April 2002. He was also put in charge of representing the KPA during receptions for foreign military attaches. In October 2006, he gave the keynote speech to a Pyongyang rally supporting 9 October nuclear testing. In 2007, he was appointed first vice-director of the KPA General Political Bureau; starting from that year, he frequently accompanied Kim Jong Il in his inspection tours. In August 2008, he gave the keynote speech during a meeting celebrating the anniversary of "Kim Jong Il's Songun leadership". At the opening of the 12th Supreme People's Assembly in 2009, he was elected to the newly expanded National Defence Commission. In September 2010, at the 3rd Party Conference, he was promoted to Politburo alternate member and Central Military Commission member.

General Kim Jong-gak was seen as one of the next generations of KPA leaders, along with Chief of General Staff Ri Yong-ho, as well as a key asset to Kim Jong Un's rise to power. He is also supposedly linked to Jang Song-thaek, Kim Jong Il's brother-in-law; notably, both of them were removed from limelight in 2003–2005, and were promoted to high positions in 2007. Kim Jong-gak's supposed part in ensuring the succession was enhanced in May 2010, when he presided over a military ceremony unveiling bronze statues of Kim Il Sung, Kim Jong Il, and Kim Jong Suk. In April 2011, the South Korean newspaper Choson Ilbo said that Kim Jong-gak was working directly under Kim Jong Un. After Jo Myong-rok's death in November 2010 left the post of KPA General Political Bureau director vacant, Kim Jong-gak probably worked as its acting chief until Choe Ryong-hae was appointed to fill the post in April 2012.

After Kim Jong Il's death, on 15 February 2012, he was promoted to Vice Marshal; on 19 February, he wrote an article for Rodong Sinmun swearing an oath of "unwavering faith" to Supreme Commander Kim Jong Un. On 10 April, in the wake of the controversial Kwangmyongsong-3 launch, he was appointed Minister of People's Armed Forces (defence minister), replacing Kim Yong-Chun. He was replaced by Kim Kyok-sik on 29 November 2012. Despite the latter's appointment, which was not reported by state media and confirmed only on 28 December as he was listed as defence minister at a reception for foreign military attache corps, Kim Jong-gak remained a member of the top leadership until 31 March 2013, when he was removed from the WPK Politburo and the National Defence Commission. He then held a minor position under the Kim Il Sung Military University as dean of its graduate school.

On 9 February 2018, North Korean media confirmed that Kim had replaced Hwang Pyong-so as the Director of the General Political Bureau of the KPA and was given back his party Politburo seat. In May, after a mere four months, he was in turn replaced by Kim Su-gil.

== Awards and honors ==
Kim could be seen wearing multiple decorations during a visit from a Cuban delegation.

Order of Kim Il Sung

Order of Kim Jong Il

Order of the National Flag First Class, five times

Order of Freedom and Independence First Class, twice

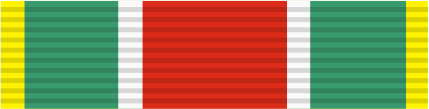
Order of Korean Labour, twice

Commemorative Order "Foundation of the Democratic People's Republic of Korea"

Commemorative Order "Anniversary of the Foundation of the People's Army"

Order of Military Service Honour First Class, twice

Commemorative Order "30th Anniversary of the Agricultural Presentation"

Order of the National Flag Second Class, three times

Order of the Red Banner of Three Great Revolutions

Order of the National Flag Third Class

Soldier's Medal of Honour Second Class, twice

Commemorative Medal "Fatherland Liberation"

Commemorative Medal "The Foundation of the People's Republic of Korea"

Medal For Military Merit, three times

Commemorative Medal "Pyongyang-Nampho Highway Construction"

Commemorative Medal "Military Parade", three times

== See also ==
- Korean People's Army
- Jo Myong-rok

Political offices
Preceded by Kim Yong-Chun	Minister of People's Armed Forces; 2012	Succeeded by Kim Kyok-sik
Military offices
Preceded by Hwang Pyong-so	Director of the KPA General Political Bureau; 2018	Succeeded by Kim Su-gil
