= Kang Bong-hun =

North Korean politician

WPK Provincial Party Committee Secretary of Chagang Province
- In office April 2019 – July 2024
- Supreme Leader: Kim Jong Un
- Preceded by: Kim Jae-ryong

Personal details
- Died: August 2024(?)
- Citizenship: North Korean
- Party: Workers' Party of Korea
- Occupation: Politician

Kang Bong-hun (Korean: 강봉훈) was a politician of North Korea. He was a member of the Party Central Committee and Chagang Province Provincial Party Committee Secretary from April 2019 until July 2024.

== Biography ==
In May 2016, during the 7th Congress of the Workers' Party of Korea he was elected as a candidate member of the Central Committee of the Workers' Party of Korea. In April 2019, he was elected as a member of the Central Committee of the Workers' Party of Korea as well as Chagang Province Provincial Party Committee Secretary, replacing Kim Jae-ryong, who was appointed to the Premier of North Korea.

However, he was dismissed late July by Kim Jong-un after he, amongst 20-30 other North Korean party officials, failed to prevent the July 27 Yalu River flood, which had trapped 7,000 residents. It is reported by a South Korean news outlet that Kim Jong-un then executed the officials in a short amount of time, Kang Bong-hun reportedly being one of them.
