= Ri Man-gon =

North Korean politician

- 리만건

Director of the Organization and Guidance Department
- In office 10 April 2019 – 28 February 2020
- Supreme Leader: Kim Jong Un
- Preceded by: Choe Ryong-hae
- Succeeded by: Kim Jae-ryong

Vice Chairman of the Workers' Party of Korea Central Committee
- In office 10 April 2019 – 28 February 2020
- Supreme Leader: Kim Jong Un
- Preceded by: Choe Ryong-hae

Secretary of the North Pyongan Committee of the Workers' Party of Korea
- In office 2010–2015
- Preceded by: Kim Pyong-hae
- Succeeded by: Kim Nung-o

Personal details
- Born: 1945; South Pyongan Province, northern Korea
- Political party: Workers' Party of Korea

Ri Man-gon (born 1945) is a North Korean politician who served as Director of the Organization and Guidance Department and Vice Chairman of the Workers' Party of Korea from 2019 to 2020. He was formerly a member of the Politburo of the Workers' Party of Korea and director of munitions and military. He was a "supervisor of the department for the nuclear and missile development".

== Career ==
Ri served as a deputy director of the Organization and Guidance Department from 2007 to 2010, when he was appointed chief secretary of the North Pyongan Provincial Committee of the Workers' Party of Korea and gained a seat in the party's Central Committee. He was transferred to Pyongyang in 2015 and promoted to party vice-chairman, Politburo member and director of the Munitions Department at the 7th Congress in May 2016. This concurred with his promotion to the newly created State Affairs Commission, and he was also included in the Central Military Commission. He returned to the OGD in October 2017 as its first deputy director, before moving up as department director on 9 April 2019.

He was not present at an October 7, 2017 mass rally in Pyongyang and an October 11, 2017 celebration for the anniversary of the Workers' Party of Korea. According to a South Korean think tank, "There's little chance that Ri and Kim have been dismissed or purged because they've been praised for major achievements recently." and "It's highly likely that they were absent because they'd been given an important assignment."

On 28 February 2020 the Politburo resolved to remove Ri as party vice-chairman, and OGD director, following a publicized corruption scandal that involved units under the OGD.

On June 17, 2020, it was revealed that Ri Man-gon was in charge of the Pyongyang General Hospital project and was the project's head person in charge. He was given the post despite the corruption investigation that occurred at the OGD which showed that he still held the trust of Kim Jong Un as he was given an important assignment. He appeared among retired officials during celebrations for the party's 75th founding anniversary.

Party political offices
| Preceded by Kim Pyong-hae | Secretary of the North Pyongan Committee of the Workers' Party of Korea; 2010–2015 | Succeeded by Kim Nung-o |
| Preceded by Choe Ryong-hae | Director of the WPK Organization and Guidance Department; 2019–2020 | Succeeded by TBD |
