= Kim Yong-hwan =

Kim Yong-hwan may refer to:

- Kim Yong-hwan (footballer)
- Kim Yong-hwan (politician)
