= On-the-spot guidance =

Personal visit to a state workplace by the supreme leader of North Korea

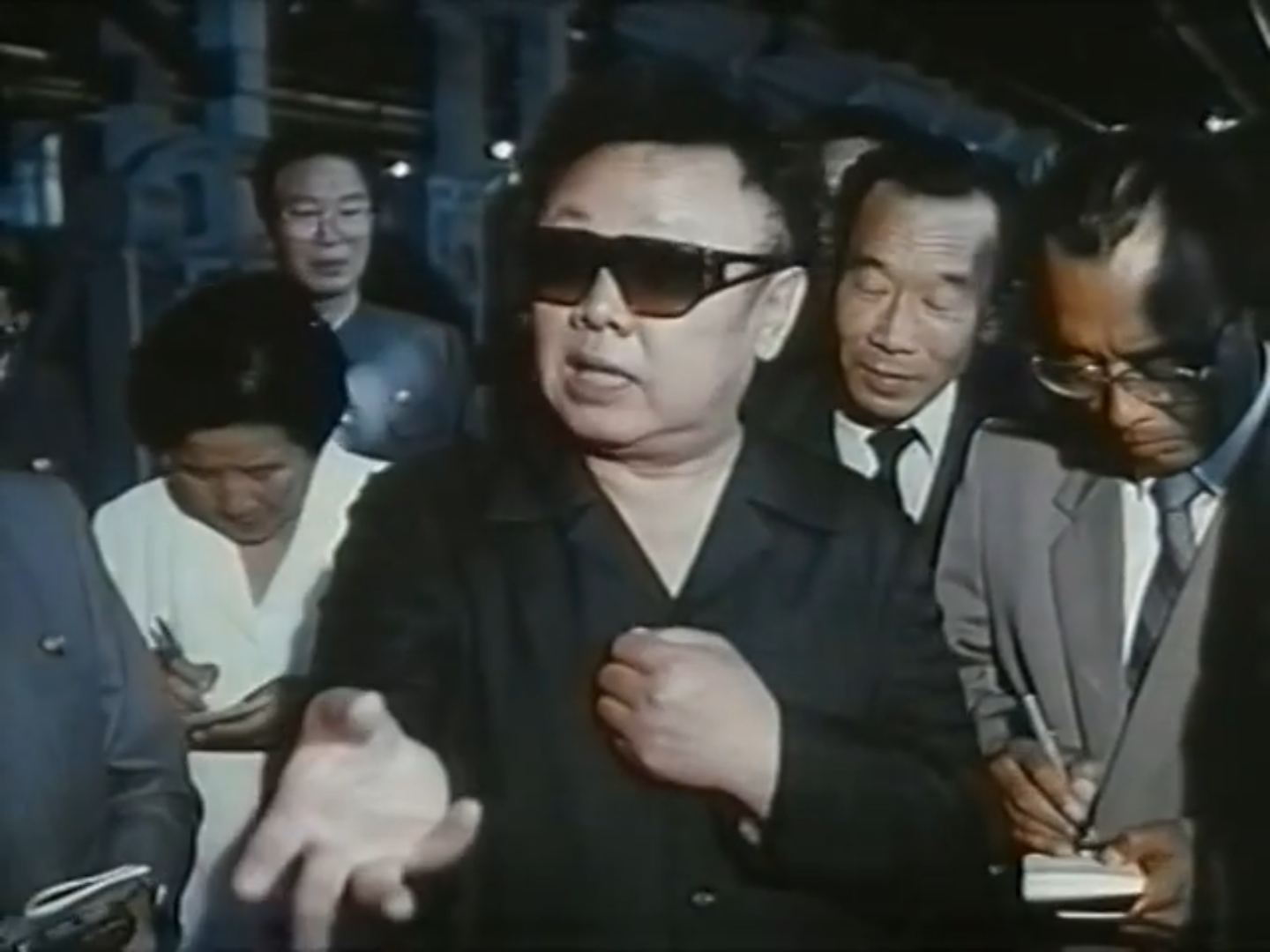
- Photographic portrait of Supreme Leader Kim Jong Il conducting a strict on-the-spot guidance tour during the 1995-1999 Arduous March

Korean name
- Hangul: 현지지도
- Hanja: 現地指導
- RR: hyeonji jido
- MR: hyŏnji chido
- IPA: [çʌn.d͡ʑi t͡ɕi.do]

"On-the-spot guidance" (also "guidance tours" or "field guidance") is a term used in the North Korean mass media to describe appearances by the supreme leader, often at sites related to the military or to industry, at which the leader gives directives. On-the-spot guidance is a key aspect of North Korean propaganda and the personality cult of the Kim dynasty. Kim Il Sung, Kim Jong Il and Kim Jong Un have all made use of the practice. On-the-spot guidance is also said to have been done by Kim Il Sung's wife and the mother of Kim Jong Il, Kim Jong Suk.

== History and role in society ==
In North Korea, on-the-spot guidance is depicted as "a unilateral favor bestowed … by the supreme ruler," and its use is one "example of how the North Korean system is based on a paternalistic, patriarchal system." In North Korean propaganda, on-the-spot guidance furthers the image of a caring, omniscient, and great leader offering "benevolent guidance" to the people. Most instances have higher-ranking military officers and officials taking notes of what the Supreme Leader is saying or recommending.

The phrase "on-the-spot guidance" was first created to describe the public activities of Kim Il Sung at some particular site. (Note: The guidance-tour concept was derived from Mao Zedong's mass-line ideology, but Kim Il-sung "methodically utilized the guidance tour to a greater extent than Mao himself had done.") North Korea officially recognizes Kim Il Sung's first guidance tour as a trip to a Pyongyang factory on 24 September 1945, but "whether this was really a guidance tour is doubtful," as Kim's local visits "were irregular and intermittent in the 1940s, rather than planned and routinized as they were in the 1950s and 1960s." The first guidance tour "as an institutionalized leadership act" came in December 1956 at the Kangson Steel Plant, at which Kim initiated the Chollima Movement "mass competition campaign for rapid economic development" (1957–1961). Kim continued to use guidance tours to launch such campaigns and other new policies.

Under Kim Il Sung, on-the-spot guidance was "a very modern form of pageantry involving intimate contacts between the charismatic ruler and the ordinary worker-citizen, with Kim making prolific visits across the country." Kim Il Sung's widely publicized visits to collective farms, factories, and other sites "powerfully and palpably" conveyed "the intent of the 'on-the-spot guidance' practice to embody state power and state authority." (Note: See also Jinwung Kim, A History of Korea: From "Land of the Morning Calm" to States in Conflict (Indiana University Press, 2012), p. 457: "To strengthen 'blood ties' with his 'children,' Kim Il-sung frequently made 'on-the-spot-guidance' tours, visiting farms, factories, and other sites of economic production throughout the country.")

Scholar Jae-Cheon Lim writes that:

For Kim Il Sung, the goals of the guidance tours were multiple. First of all, he wanted to mobilize the masses in order to achieve economic goals by directly appealing to them. Second, he wanted to check whether his policy, which was decided at the top level, was being implemented in lower-level organizations as he intended. Third, he used the guidance tours as a means of understanding the situations that existed in these lower-level organizations before deciding on new policy issues at the top level. In sum, the guidance tour was the North Korean leader's ruling method for multiple purposes – mass mobilization, policy inspection, and reality checks – and was also a means of redressing bureaucratic red tape.

In the 1970s, Kim Il Sung's son Kim Jong Il assumed responsibility for arranging his father's tours after being named heir apparent. Throughout the 1970s and 1980s, as the Kim Il Sung personality cult deepened, the guidance tours became a ritualized and even sanctified routine act. Several different varieties of guidance tours emerged. A regular guidance tour involved the inspection of a site; this was longer in duration and involved more extensive preparation than other types. A special guidance tour involved the leader selecting a particular workplace unit as a model for some mass-mobilization campaign. A third type of guidance tour was a repeated visit to a previously visited site to follow up on implementation. Finally, there was "the spontaneous guidance tour, in which the leader visited a place on the spot during a regular or special guidance tour." As heir apparent, Kim Jong Il also began undertaking his own guidance tours, although these were initially referred to as "business inspections" and then "business guidance," with the phrase "on-the-spot guidance" first used in reference to Kim Jong Il on 5 April 1988, when he "visited postal and broadcasting sites."

In 1994, after his father's death, Kim Jong Il became supreme leader, and he continued the on-the-spot guidance practice. Kim Jong Il's guidance tours were "more symbolic" than his father's, and Kim Jong Il "carried them out in a more mechanical and choreographed way, avoiding direct contact with ordinary North Koreans to a greater extent than his father had done." In contrast to his father's focus on economic sites, Kim Jong Il emphasized military sites for his on-the-spot guidance visits. Over half of Kim Jong Il's visits were made to military units or were otherwise military-related, although he also made visits to the agricultural and light industry sites. This focus on visiting army bases and other military installations during the "Arduous March" period emphasized the government's "military-first" (Songun) strategy to the North Korean public. The large volume of visits made by Kim was emphasized in North Korean propaganda.

"In contrast to his father, Kim Jong-un has … focused his on-the-spot guidance visits on Pyongyang." Along with Kim Jong Un's undertaking of projects directed to appeal to this class, such as "a maternity hospital, health complex, skating rink, apartment complexes, and a fun fair," this is seen by analysts as one indication that Kim has attempted to consolidate support among North Korean urban elites.

The South Korean National Intelligence Service reports that advance preparation work for on-the-spot guidance begins at the designated factory or other workplace "one year before the actual guidance is delivered." At the actual event, the leader will dispense "practical advice" and instructions for improving productivity or working conditions. The leader is surrounded by soldiers, party members, or government officials who carefully take down everything said by the leader (even jokes) in identical paper notebooks. The scene of various apparatchiks intently recording the leader's every word is broadcast via state media, furthering the image of the leader as all-knowing. After the event, "loyalty-determination gatherings" are held, and a monument or plaque commemorating the visit and the remarks are set up. This is used as a tool for "idolization"; and the site is treated with reverence.

Analysts have used the presence of various North Korean officials accompanying the leader on on-the-spot guidance visits as a way of discerning differences in the North Korean hierarchy and power structure under Kim Jong Il and Kim Jong Un. In this social network analysis, the rise and fall of individuals can be observed, and the relative power of different groups by age and affiliation (party organ versus government bureau versus military) can be seen.

== Works cited ==
- Heonik Kwon & Byung-Ho Chung, North Korea: Beyond Charismatic Politics (Rowman & Littlefield, 2012).
- Helen-Louise Hunter, Kim Il-song's North Korea (Greenwood: 1999).
- Jae-Cheon Lim, Leader Symbols and Personality Cult in North Korea: The Leader State (Routledge, 2015).
