= Kim Yong-hwan (politician) =

North Korean politician (fl. 21st century)

Chief Secretary of the Pyongyang City Committee of the Workers' Party of Korea
- In office February 2020 – 2023
- Supreme Leader: Kim Jong Un
- Preceded by: Kim Nung-o
- Succeeded by: Kim Su-gil

Chief Secretary of the Ryanggang Province Committee of the Workers' Party of Korea
- In office December 2019 – February 2020
- Supreme Leader: Kim Jong Un
- Preceded by: Lee Sang-won
- Succeeded by: Ri Tae-il

Personal details
- Citizenship: North Korean
- Party: Workers' Party of Korea
- Occupation: Politician

Kim Yong-hwan (Korean: 김영환) is a politician of North Korea. He is a member of the Party Censorship Committee and Chairman of the Pyongyang Party Committee of the Workers' Party of Korea.

== Biography ==
In February 1997, he was appointed first vice-chairman of the Central Court of the Democratic People's Republic of Korea. In May 2016, at the 7th Congress of the Workers' Party of Korea he was elected as a member of the WPK Inspection Commission. After being appointed chairman of the Ryanggang Province Party Committee in December 2019, he was elected chairman of the Pyongyang Party Party Committee of the Workers' Party of Korea at the Political Bureau expanded meeting on February 29, 2020.

Party political offices
Preceded by Kim Nung-o	Chairman of WPK Pyongyang Provincial Committee; 2020–2023	Succeeded by Kim Su-gil
