= Kim Jae-ryong =

Premier of North Korea (2019–2020)

- 김재룡

Director of the Organization and Guidance Department
- In office 13 August 2020 – 23 June 2026
- Supreme Leader: Kim Jong Un
- Preceded by: Ri Man-gon
- Succeeded by: Jo Yong-won

12th Premier of North Korea
- In office 11 April 2019 – 13 August 2020
- President: Kim Jong Un
- Preceded by: Pak Pong-ju
- Succeeded by: Kim Tok-hun

Chairman of the WPK Chagang Provincial Committee
- In office 2016–2019
- Preceded by: ?
- Succeeded by: Kang Bong-hun

Personal details
- Born: 1959 (age 66–67) Chagang Province, North Korea
- Party: Workers' Party of Korea

Kim Jae-ryong (Korean: 김재룡, born 1959) is a North Korean politician who served as Premier of North Korea from April 2019 to August 2020. A senior official within the Workers' Party of Korea, he has served as the director of the Organization and Guidance Department since 2020 and as a deputy to the Supreme People's Assembly.

== Career ==
Relatively little is known about Kim's early career. Before his premiership, he held positions in political guidance at various industrial sites. Around 2007, he was appointed to his first important position as the secretary of the Workers' Party of Korea (WPK) North Pyongan Province provincial committee. He was appointed acting secretary of the WPK Chagang provincial committee in 2015 and from 2016 to 2019 he was officially the provincial party secretary, when he was replaced by Kang Bong-hun in that position. Kim became a member of the WPK Central Committee in 2016.

He is also believed at one point to have held a post within the Workers' Party of Korea that oversaw Sinuiju and the free economic zone area of the city.

=== Premiership ===
On 10 March 2019, Kim was elected to the Supreme People's Assembly in the parliamentary election. Less than a month later, during the first session of the 14th Supreme People's Assembly, Kim was appointed premier, replacing Pak Pong-ju. He was also elected to be a member of the Politburo and the Central Military Commission.

Kim as premier has also conducted multiple site inspections around the country from agricultural sites, factories and even to an apartment project in the capitol of Pyongyang.

Kim was relieved of his position as premier on 13 August 2020 and replaced by Kim Tok-hun.

=== Post-premiership ===
Following his dismissal as premier, Kim was appointed to lead the Organization and Guidance Department, and he was in charge of preparations for the 8th Party Congress, after which he maintained his seat in the Politburo. Previous claims that he had been appointed to a new body called the Organization Administrative Department appeared inconsistent with later reports indicating that another official was in charge of the newly created department handling judicial affairs.

In June 2023, at the Eighth Plenary Session of the Eighth Central Committee, he was removed from his posts as member of the Political Bureau of the Party Central Committee and Secretary of the Central Committee.

In August 2023, he was reinstated as member of the Political Bureau of the Party Central Committee and secretary of the Central Committee.

Member of the 14th Supreme People's Assembly of North Korea.

In June 2026 he was dismissed from all his positions.

Political offices
Preceded by Pak Pong-ju	Premier of North Korea; 2019–2020	Succeeded by Kim Tok-hun
Party political offices
Preceded by Ri Man-gon	Director of the Organization and Guidance Department; 2020–2026	Succeeded by Jo Yong-won
