= General Political Bureau of the Korean People's Army =

North Korean Ministry of Defence department

- 조선인민군 총정치국
- Type: Bureau of the Ministry of Defence
- Director: Colonel General Jong Kyong-thaek
- Parent organization: Ministry of Defence

The General Political Bureau (GPB) is a department of the Ministry of Defence, used by the leadership of the North Korean government to exert political control over the Korean People's Army (KPA). The GPB operates under the direction of the Central Military Commission of the Workers' Party of Korea. The GPB controls units of the KPA on all levels down to company level. It primarily exerts control through propaganda, education, and cultural activities. Under directions of the State Affairs Commission of North Korea, it also controls troop movements.

As of January 2023, the Director of the General Political Bureau is Jong Kyong-thaek, who succeeded Kwon Yong-jin.

== History ==
During Kim Jong Il's Songun (military first) era in particular, the GPB remained relatively independent and unchanged for decades. In the 3rd WPK Representatives Conference held in 2010, GPB was granted equal status to the Central Committee of the WPK. During this time, it has been called as the internal politburo of the KPA.

However, the influence of the GPB has decreased under Kim Jong Un's rule; after the 7th Congress of the WPK held in May 2016, the party had regained enough power to exert influence over the GPB. Consequentially, in 2017 the party Central Committee was ordered to carry out an inspection of the GPB, the first of its kind in 20 years. The inspection was carried out by Choe Ryong-hae. The GPB director Hwang Pyong-so was punished, and removed from his position as Standing Commissioner. The 8th WPK Congress held in 2021 also oversaw the demotion of the GPB, no longer being equal to the Central Committee. Some of GPB's functions were also transferred to the newly established Military-Political Leadership Department of the WPK CC. In May 2025, at a meeting of the Central Military Commission, GPB Director Jong Kyong-thaek was demoted to Colonel General, the lowest rank of an incumbent GPB director since the 1970s.

== Directors ==
- O Chin-u (1979–1995)
- Jo Myong-rok (1995–2010)
- Choe Ryong-hae (12 April 2012 – 26 April 2014)
- Hwang Pyong-so (26 April 2014 – 9 February 2018)
- Kim Jong-gak (2018)
- Kim Su-gil (May 2018 – January 2021)
- Kwon Yong-jin (2021–2022)
- Jong Kyong-thaek (2022–present)

== In popular culture ==
- The General Political Bureau (GPB) is featured in the South Korean drama Crash Landing on You, where the main character Ri Jeong-hyeok has power and authority in Korean People's Army due to his father being the Director of the GPB.

== See also ==
- General Staff Department of the Korean People's Army
- Political commissar
