= 1st Cabinet of North Korea =

- State Emblem

2 September 1948 – 18 September 1957 (9 years, 16 days) Overview
- Type: Plenary Meeting of the Cabinet of North Korea
- Election: 1st Session of the 1st Supreme People's Assembly

Members
- Total: 21

The 1st Cabinet of North Korea was elected by the 1st Session of the 1st Supreme People's Assembly on 9 September 1948. It was replaced on 20 September 1957 by the 2nd Cabinet.

== Members ==
Rank	Office	Name	Hangul	Took office	Left office	Duration	2nd CAB
1	Premier of the Cabinet	Kim Il Sung	김일성	9 September 1948	20 September 1957	9 years and 11 days	Reelected
2	Vice Premier of the Cabinet	Pak Hon-yong	박헌영	9 September 1948	3 March 1953	4 years and 175 days	Removed
2	Vice Premier of the Cabinet	Hong Myong-hui	홍명희	9 September 1948	20 September 1957	9 years and 11 days	Reelected
2	Vice Premier of the Cabinet	Kim Chaek	김책	9 September 1948	31 January 1951	2 years and 144 days	Killed
2	Vice Premier of the Cabinet	Ho Ka-i	허가이	November 1951	2 July 1953	1 year and 214 days	Suicide
2	Vice Premier of the Cabinet	Choe Chang-ik	최창익	29 November 1952	September 1956	3 years and 277 days	Not
2	Vice Premier of the Cabinet	Choe Yong-gon	최용건	29 November 1952	20 September 1957	4 years and 295 days	Promoted
2	Vice Premier of the Cabinet	Pak Ui-wan	박의완	July 1953	20 September 1957	4 years and 51 days	Reelected
2	Vice Premier of the Cabinet	Pak Chang-ok	박창옥	23 March 1954	September 1956	2 years and 162 days	Not
2	Vice Premier of the Cabinet	Kim Il	김일	23 March 1954	20 September 1957	3 years and 181 days	Reelected
2	Vice Premier of the Cabinet	Chong Chun-taek	정준택	11 May 1956	20 September 1957	1 year and 132 days	Reelected
5	Chairman of the State Planning Commission	Chong Chun-taek	정준택	9 September 1948	23 March 1954	5 years and 195 days	Reelected
5	Chairman of the State Planning Commission	Pak Chang-ok	박창옥	23 March 1954	16 January 1956	1 year and 299 days	Not
5	Chairman of the State Planning Commission	Ri Jong-ok	리종옥	16 January 1956	20 September 1957	1 year and 247 days	Reelected
6	Minister of National Defence	Choe Yong-gon	최용건	9 September 1948	20 September 1957	9 years and 11 days	Promoted
7	Minister of State Control	Kim Won-bong	김원봉	9 September 1948	8 May 1952	3 years and 242 days	Not
7	Minister of State Control	Choe Chang-ik	최창익	8 May 1952	August 1955	3 years and 85 days	Not
7	Minister of State Control	Yi Hyo-sun	리효순	August 1955	November 1955	62 days	Not
7	Minister of State Control	Kim Ik-son	김익선	November 1955	11 May 1956	163 days	Not
7	Minister of State Control	Pak Mun-gyu	박문규	11 May 1956	20 September 1957	1 year and 132 days	Reelected
8	Minister of Interior	Pak Il-u	박일우	9 September 1948	October 1952	4 years and 22 days	Removed
8	Minister of Interior	Pang Hak-se	방학세	October 1952	20 September 1957	4 years and 324 days	Reelected
9	Minister of Foreign Affairs	Pak Hon-yong	박헌영	9 September 1948	3 March 1953	4 years and 175 days	Removed
9	Minister of Foreign Affairs	Nam Il	남일	3 March 1953	20 September 1957	4 years and 201 days	Reelected
10	Minister of Industry	Kim Chaek	김책	9 September 1948	31 January 1951	2 years and 144 days	Killed
10	Minister of Industry	Jong Il-ryong	정일룡	1 February 1951	27 July 1951	176 days	Reelected
11	Minister of Agriculture and Forestry	Pak Mun-gyu	박문규	9 September 1948	29 November 1952	4 years and 81 days	Reelected
12	Minister of Commerce	Chang Si-u	장시우	9 September 1948	October 1952	4 years and 22 days	Not
12	Minister of Commerce	Yi Chu-yon	리주연	October 1952	23 March 1954	1 year and 143 days	Reelected
12	Minister of Commerce	Yun Kong-hum	윤공흠	23 March 1954	September 1956	2 years and 162 days	Not
13	Minister of Transportation	Chu Yong-ha	주영하	9 September 1948	October 1948	22 days	Not
13	Minister of Transportation	Pak Ui-wan	박의완	October 1948	July 1951	2 years and 243 days	Reelected
13	Minister of Transportation	Kim Hoe-il	김회일	December 1953	20 September 1957	3 years and 263 days	Reelected
14	Minister of Finance	Choe Chang-ik	최창익	9 September 1948	29 November 1952	4 years and 81 days	Not
14	Minister of Finance	Yun Kong-hum	윤공흠	29 November 1952	23 March 1954	1 year and 114 days	Not
14	Minister of Finance	Choe Chang-ik	최창익	23 March 1954	November 1954	223 days	Not
14	Minister of Finance	Yi Chu-yon	리주연	November 1954	20 September 1957	2 years and 294 days	Reelected
15	Minister of Education	Paek Nam-un	백남운	9 September 1948	16 January 1956	7 years and 129 days	Not
15	Minister of Education	Kim Chang-man	김창만	16 January 1956	11 May 1956	116 days	Not
15	Minister of Education	Han Sol-ya	한설야	11 May 1956	3 August 1957	1 year and 84 days	Reelected
—	Minister of Education and Culture	Han Sol-ya	한설야	3 August 1956	20 September 1957	1 year and 48 days	Reelected
16	Minister of Communications	Kim Chong-ju	김정주	9 September 1948	March 1953	4 years and 173 days	Not
16	Minister of Communications	Pak Il-u	박일우	March 1953	November 1955	2 years and 215 days	Removed
16	Minister of Communications	Kim Chang-hum	김창흠	November 1955	20 September 1957	1 year and 294 days	Not
17	Minister of Justice	Yi Sung-yop	리승엽	9 September 1948	13 December 1951	3 years and 95 days	Removed
17	Minister of Justice	Yi Yong	리용	13 December 1951	December 1953	1 year and 353 days	Not
17	Minister of Justice	Hong Ki-ju	홍기주	December 1953	July 1957	3 years and 182 days	Not
17	Minister of Justice	Ho Jong-suk	허정숙	3 August 1957	20 September 1957	48 days	Reelected
18	Minister of Culture and Propaganda	Ho Jong-suk	허정숙	9 September 1948	3 August 1957	8 years and 328 days	Reelected
19	Minister of Labour	Ho Song-taek	허성택	9 September 1948	May 1952	5 years and 142 days	Reelected
19	Minister of Labour	Kim Won-bong	김원봉	May 1952	20 September 1957	5 years and 112 days	Not
20	Minister of Public Health	Yi Pyong-nam	리병남	9 September 1948	20 September 1957	9 years and 11 days	Reelected
21	Minister of City Management	Yi Yong	리용	9 September 1948	13 December 1951	3 years and 95 days	Not
21	Minister of City Management	Yi Ki-sok	리기석	20 January 1955	3 August 1957	3 years and 95 days	Not
22	Minister without Portfolio	Yi Kuk-no	리극로	9 September 1948	December 1953	5 years and 83 days	Not
22	Minister without Portfolio	Chu Hwang-sop	주황섭	July 1953	October 1953	62 days	Reelected
22	Minister without Portfolio	Yi Yong	리용	December 1953	March 1955	1 year and 60 days	Not
22	Minister without Portfolio	Kim Tal-hyon	김달현	December 1953	20 September 1957	3 years and 263 days	Not
—	Minister of Agriculture	Pak Mun-gyu	박문규	29 November 1952	23 March 1954	5 years and 195 days	Reelected
—	Minister of Agriculture	Kim Il	김일	23 March 1954	20 September 1957	3 years and 181 days	Reelected
—	Minister of Chemical Industry	Paek Hong-gwon	백홍권	May 1952	23 March 1954	1 year and 296 days	Not
—	Minister of Chemical Industry	Chong Chun-taek	정준택	23 March 1954	11 May 1956	2 years and 49 days	Not
—	Minister of Chemical Industry	Yi Chon-ho	리천호	11 May 1956	20 September 1957	1 year and 132 days	Reelected
—	Minister of City Construction	Kim Sung-hwa	김승화	13 December 1951	June 1953	1 year and 170 days	Not
—	Minister of City Construction	Chu Hwang-sop	주황섭	October 1953	23 March 1954	143 days	Not
—	Minister of Coal Industry	Yu Chuk-un	류축운	11 May 1956	20 September 1957	1 year and 132 days	Not
—	Minister of Construction	Kim Sung-hwa	김승화	20 January 1955	August 1956	1 year and 194 days	Not
—	Minister of Construction	Choe Chae-ha	최재하	December 1956	3 August 1957	215 days	Reelected
—	Minister of Construction and Building Materials Industries	Choe Chae-ha	최재하	3 August 1957	20 September 1957	48 days	Reelected
—	Minister of Electric Power	Kim Tu-sam	김두삼	23 March 1954	20 September 1957	3 years and 181 days	Reelected
—	Minister of Fisheries	Chu Hwang-sop	주황섭	23 March 1954	20 September 1957	3 years and 181 days	Reelected
—	Minister of Foreign Trade	Chin Pan-su	진반수	April 1953	11 May 1956	3 years and 11 days	Reelected
—	Minister of Heavy Industry	Jong Il-ryong	정일룡	November 1951	29 November 1952	365 days	Reelected
—	Minister of Heavy Industry	Kim Tu-sam	김두삼	29 November 1952	23 March 1954	1 year and 114 days	Reelected
—	Minister of Heavy Industry	Jong Il-ryong	정일룡	23 March 1954	25 June 1956	2 years and 94 days	Reelected
—	Minister of Internal and External Commerce	Chin Pan-su	진반수	11 September 1957	20 September 1957	9 days	Reelected
—	Minister of Light Industry	Ri Jong-ok	리종옥	27 July 1951	23 March 1954	2 years and 239 days	Reelected
—	Minister of Light Industry	Pak Ui-wan	박의완	23 March 1954	January 1955	284 days	Reelected
—	Minister of Light Industry	Ri Jong-ok	리종옥	January 1955	November 1955	274 days	Reelected
—	Minister of Light Industry	Mun Man-uk	문만욱	November 1955	20 September 1957	1 year and 294 days	Reelected
—	Minister of Metal Industry	Jong Il-ryong	정일룡	25 June 1955	November 1955	129 days	Reelected
—	Minister of Metal Industry	Kang Yong-chang	강영창	November 1955	20 September 1957	1 year and 294 days	Reelected
—	Minister of Machine Industry	Pak Chang-ok	박창옥	11 May 1956	September 1956	113 days	Not
—	Chairman of the People's Control Commission	Yi Sung-yop	리승엽	8 May 1952	March 1953	297 days	Removed
—	Chairman of the People's Control Commission	Yi Ki-sok	리기석	March 1953	20 January 1955	1 year and 295 days	Not
—	Minister of Procurement and Food Administration	O Ki-sop	오기섭	11 May 1956	3 August 1957	1 year and 84 days	Not
—	Minister of Public Security	Pang Hak-se	방학세	6 March 1951	December 1952	1 year and 270 days	Reelected
—	Minister of Railways	Pak Ui-wan	박의완	31 July 1951	19 December 1953	2 years and 141 days	Reelected
—	Minister of Rural Management	Chong Song-on	정성언	3 August 1957	20 September 1957	48 days	Reelected
—	Chairman of the State Construction Commission	Kim Sung-hwa	김승화	8 June 1953	20 January 1955	1 year and 226 days	Not
—	Chairman of the State Construction Commission	Pak Ui-wan	박의완	20 January 1955	20 September 1957	2 years and 243 days	Not
