= Kim Sung-hwa =

North Korean politician

- 김승화

Member of the WPK Politburo

Personal details
- Born: 4 February 1915 Nezhino, Primorskaya Oblast, Russian Empire
- Died: 23 January 1973 (aged 57)
- Occupation: Politician

Kim Sung-hwa (Korean: 김승화, Russian: Ким Сын Хва; 4 February 1915 – 23 January 1973) was a North Korean politician. From 13 December 1951 to June 1953, he served as the Minister of City Construction in the 1st Cabinet and from 20 January 1955 to August 1956 as the Minister of Construction. In 1953 to 1956 he was a member of the 6th Joint Plenary Session (1953–56) of the 2nd Standing Committee. He was part of the Soviet-faction and criticized Kim's growing cult of personality and was purged in 1956.

== Biography ==
Born in 1915 into a poor peasant family in the village of Nezhino, Primorsky Krai.

In 1933, he graduated from secondary school. Beginning in 1933, he served as the head of the elementary school in the village of Gornoye, Far Eastern Krai. Later, he entered the Vladivostok Teachers’ Institute. In 1937, he was deported to the Kyzyl-Orda Region of the Kazakh SSR. Starting in 1938, he lived in Samarkand, where he continued his education at Samarkand State University. From 1941, he worked as a teacher and later as the principal of a secondary school in the town of Begovat, Tashkent Region. In 1943, he joined the All-Union Communist Party (Bolsheviks). From 1944, he served as deputy chairman of the Begovat District Executive Committee.

In December 1946, he was sent to North Korea to help organize the state and administrative structures of the DPRK. Until 1948, he was director of the Central Party School of the Workers’ Party of Korea. He became a member of the Workers’ Party of Korea. Beginning in 1948, he became the successor to Petr Pak-Ir, who had overseen the organization of higher education in Pyongyang. He was appointed vice-rector of a university in Pyongyang.

In 1948, at the 2nd Congress of the WPK, he was elected a member of the Party’s Central Committee. Later, he served as Chief of Staff of the Cabinet of Ministers, secretary of the Military Committee, acting Minister of Construction, acting Minister of Urban Construction, and chairman of the State Committee for Construction (1950–1955). From 1953 until April 1956, he was a member of the Presidium of the WPK Central Committee. In 1955, he was appointed Minister of Construction of the DPRK.

He was part of the so-called “Soviet faction” of senior DPRK political figures who opposed Kim Il Sung. This faction also included Pak Chang-ok and Ho Ka-i. Due to political struggle among factions in the WPK, at the 3rd Congress in April 1956, Kim Sung-hwa was removed from the Presidium of the Central Committee, though he retained his membership in the Central Committee. On 26 August 1956, he was dismissed from his post as Minister of Construction. On 30 August 1956, a Plenum of the WPK Central Committee was convened, at which the “Soviet faction” suffered political defeat. In December 1957, influential politician Pak Chang-ok was expelled from the Central Committee and was later executed.

Before the start of the August 1956 Plenum, Kim Sung-hwa left for the USSR, where he was admitted to postgraduate studies at the Academy of Social Sciences under the CPSU Central Committee, and later to postgraduate studies at the Institute of History, Archaeology, and Ethnography of the Academy of Sciences of the Kazakh SSR. In 1960, he defended his dissertation for the degree of Candidate of Sciences on the topic “Korean Peasants of the Russian Far East in the Late 19th – Early 20th Centuries.” Beginning in 1960, he worked as a senior research fellow at the Institute of History, Archaeology, and Ethnography of the Academy of Sciences of the Kazakh SSR. His work focused on the history of Soviet Koreans. In 1971, he was awarded the academic degree of Doctor of Historical Sciences.

He died on 23 January 1973 and was buried in Alma-Ata.
