= Central Committee of the Communist Party of South Korea =

Government agency in North Korea

Central Committee of the Communist Party of Korea
- Emblem

14 September 1945 – 24 November 1946 (1 year, 71 days) Overview
- Type: Executive Committee of the North Korean Branch Bureau
- Election: Congress of the Communist Party of Korea

Members
- Total: 31

Apparatus
- No. of departments: Possibly 9

The Central Committee of the Communist Party of Korea (CPK) (Korean: 조선공산당 중앙위원회) was elected by the party congress on 14 September 1945, and remained in session until the formation the Workers' Party of South Korea and its Central Committee on 24 November 1946. In between party congresses the Central Committee was the highest decision-making institution in the CPK. The Central Committee was not a permanent institution and delegated day-to-day work to elected bodies, such as the Politburo, Secretariat and the Organisational Bureau in the case of this Central Committee. It convened meetings, known as "Plenary Session of the [term] Central Committee", to discuss major policies. A plenary session could be attended by non-members. These meetings were known as "Enlarged Plenary Session".

When the North Korean Branch Bureau declared independence from the CPK under the name Communist Party of North Korea, the CPK changed its name as well, into the Communist Party of South Korea.

== Meetings ==
- 16 August 1945
- 20 August 1945
- 8 September 1945
- 11–14 September 1945; party Congress.
- No data available for meetings between 14 September 1945 – 4 September 1946.
- 14 September 1946: preparatory meeting with the People's Party and the New Democratic Party to form the Workers' Party of South Korea.

== Members ==
Rank	Name	Hangul	Posts	WPNK	WPSK	Inner-composition		
Rank	Name	Hangul	Posts	WPNK	WPSK	POL	ORG	SEC
1	Pak Hon-yong	박헌영	Chairman of the CPK Central Committee	—	Elected	Member	Member	—
2	Kim Il Sung	허헌	—	Elected	—	Member	—	—
3	Yi Chu-ha	이주하	—	—	Elected	Member	—	Member
4	Mu Chong	무정	—	Elected	—	Member	—	—
5	Kang Chin	강진	—	—	—	Member	—	—
6	Choe Chang-ik	최창익	—	Elected	—	Member	—	—
7	Ri Sung-yop	리승엽	—	—	Elected	Member	—	—
8	Kwon O-chik	권오직	—	—	—	Member	—	—
9	Yi Hyon-sang	이현상	—	—	Elected	—	Member	—
10	Kim Sam-yong	김삼룡	—	—	Elected	—	Member	—
11	Kim Hyung-sun	김형선	—	—	—	—	Member	—
12	Ho Song-taek	허성택	—	—	Elected	—	—	Member
13	Kim Tae-jun	김태준	—	—	Elected	—	—	Member
14	Yi Ku-hun	이구훈	—	—	—	—	—	Member
15	Yi Sun-gun	이순금	—	Elected	—	—	—	Member
16	Kang Mun-sok	강문석	—	—	Elected	—	—	Member
17	Park Chang-bin	박창빈	—	—	—	—	—	—
18	Choe Yong-gon	최용건	—	Elected	—	—	—	—
19	Hong Nam-pyo	박창빈	—	—	Elected	—	—	—
20	Yi Chu-sang	이주상	—	—	Elected	—	—	—
21	So Chung-sok	서중석	—	—	—	—	—	—
22	Yi In-tong	이인동	—	—	—	—	—	—
23	Cho Pok-rye	조복례	—	—	—	—	—	—
24	Pak Kwang-hui	박광희	—	—	—	—	—	—
25	Kim Chom-kwon	김점권	—	—	—	—	—	—
26	Kim Yong-bom	김용범	—	—	—	—	—	—
27	Hong To-kyu	홍덕유	—	—	—	—	—	—
28	Chu Cha-pok	주자복	—	—	—	—	—	—
29	Mun Kap-song	문갑송	—	—	—	—	—	—
30	Kim Kun	김근	—	—	—	—	—	—
31	O Ki-sop	오기섭	—	Elected	—	—	—	—
