= Central Committee of the Workers' Party of South Korea =

1946–1949 political organization

1st Central Committee

24 November 1946 – 24 June 1949 (2 years, 212 days) Overview
- Type: Central Committee of the Workers' Party of South Korea
- Election: 1946 Congress

Leadership
- Chairman: Ho Hon
- Vice Chairmen: Pak Hon-yong; Yi Ki-sok
- Political Committee: 8 members
- Standing Committee: 14 members

The Central Committee of the Workers' Party of South Korea (WPSK) was elected by the party congress on 24 November 1946 through the merger of the Communist Party of South Korea, New People's Party of Korea and a faction of the People's Party of Korea, and remained in session until the merger of the WPSK with the Workers' Party of North Korea on 24 June 1949. In between party congresses the Central Committee was the highest decision-making institution in the WPSK. The Central Committee was not a permanent institution and delegated day-to-day work to elected bodies, such as the Political Committee and the Standing Committee in the case of this Central Committee. It convened meetings, known as "Plenary Session of the [term] Central Committee", to discuss major policies. A plenary session could be attended by non-members. These meetings were known as "Enlarged Plenary Session".

== Members ==
Rank	Name	Hangul	Level of government	WPNK	Inner-composition	
Rank	Name	Hangul	Level of government	WPNK	1st POC	1st STC
1	Ho Hon	허헌	Chairman of the WPSK Central Committee	Reelected	Member	Member
2	Pak Hon-yong	박헌영	Vice Chairman of the WPSK Central Committee	Reelected	Member	Member
3	Yi Ki-sok	이기석	Vice Chairman of the WPSK Central Committee	Reelected	Member	Member
4	Yi Sung-yop	이성엽	—	Reelected	Member	Member
5	Ku Chae-su	구채수	—	Reelected	Member	Member
6	Kim Sam-yong	김삼룡	—	Reelected	Member	Member
7	Kim Yong-am	김용암	—	Reelected	Member	Member
8	Kang Mun-sok	강문석	—	Reelected	—	Member
9	Yu Yong-jun	유용준	—	Reelected	—	Member
10	Yi Hyon-sang	이현상	Head of the Cadre Department	Reelected	—	Member
11	Ko Chan-bo	고찬보	—	Reelected	—	Member
12	Kim O-song	김오송	—	Reelected	—	Member
13	Song Ul-su	송울수	—	Reelected	—	Member
14	Yi Chae-nam	이채남	—	Reelected	—	—
15	Kim Sang-hyok	김상혁	—	Reelected	—	—
16	Kim Yong-jae	김용재	—	Reelected	—	—
17	Kim Kye-rim	김계림	—	Reelected	—	—
18	Kim Kwang-su	김광수	—	Reelected	—	—
19	Chong No-sik	종노식	—	Reelected	—	—
20	Song Yu-gyong	송유경	—	Reelected	—	—
21	Chong Yun	윤종	—	Reelected	—	—
22	Kim Chin-guk	김진국	—	Reelected	—	—
23	Hyon U-hyon	현유현	—	Reelected	—	—
24	Hong Nam-pyo	박창빈	—	Reelected	—	—
25	Pak Mun-gyu	박문규	—	Reelected	—	—
26	Yi Chu-ha	이주하	—	Reelected	Member	Member
27	Kim Tae-jun	김태준	—	Reelected	—	—
28	Ho Song-taek	허성택	—	Reelected	—	—
