= Hong Myong-hui =

Korean novelist (1888–1968)

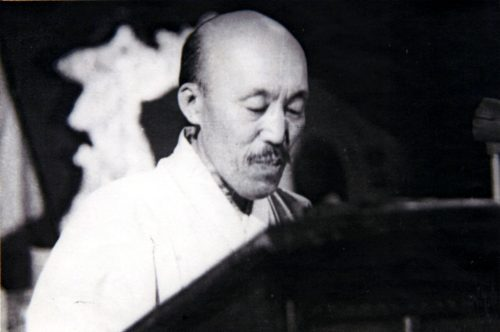

Vice Premier of the Cabinet
- In office 9 September 1948 – 23 October 1962 Serving with Pak Hon-yong, Kim Chaek, Ho Ka-i, Choe Chang-ik, Choe Yong-gon, Pak Ui-wan, Pak Chang-ok, Kim Il, Chong Chun-taek, Nam Il, Yi Chu-yon, Ri Jong-ok and Kim Kwang-hyop.
- Premier: Kim Il Sung

Personal details
- Born: 3 July 1888 Dongbu-ri, North Chungcheong Province, Korean Empire
- Died: 5 March 1968 (aged 79)
- Citizenship: North Korean
- Party: Democratic Independent Party

Korean name
- Hangul: 홍명희
- Hanja: 洪命熹
- RR: Hong Myeonghui
- MR: Hong Myŏnghŭi

Art name
- Hangul: 벽초
- Hanja: 碧初
- RR: Byeokcho
- MR: Pyŏkch'o

Hong Myong-hui or Hong Myung-hee (Korean: 홍명희; Hanja: 洪命熹; July 3, 1888 – March 5, 1968) was a Korean novelist during the colonial period, and later a North Korean novelist and state official.

He was born in Dongbu-ri, Goesan county, North Chungcheong Province, where he took part in the 3.1 Movement in 1919. In the 1920s, he served as an editor of The Dong-A Ilbo. Hong also was part of the Korean nationalist group Singanhoe which was founded in 1927.

Hong founded the Democratic Independent Party with his comrades An Jae-hong, Kim Byung-ro, Kim Ho, Pak Yong-hee, I Kuk-ro and Kim Won-yong on 19 October 1947. Hong then became the chairman of the party. After the Korean War, he occupied various important positions in North Korea.

He is buried in the Patriotic Martyrs' Cemetery in Hyongjesan-guyok, Pyongyang, North Korea. His grandson, Hong Sok-jung, is also a well known North Korean author.

== Works ==
- Im Kkokjong (임꺽정) -historical novel based on the life of the Korean rebel Im Kkokjong (d.1562).

== See also ==
- Korean literature

== Links ==
- Grave of Hong Myong Hui
