= Democratic Independent Party =

North and South Korean political party

- Abbreviation: DIP
- Chairperson: Hong Myong-hui
- Founder: An Jae-hong, Kim Byung-ro, Hong Myong-hui, Kim Ho, Pak Yong-hee, Yi Kuk-no, Kim Won-yong
- Founded: 19 October 1947
- Dissolved: 8 October 1949 (Note: in South Korea); Mid or late 1960s (Note: in North Korea)
- Ideology: Korean nationalism Social democracy Progressivism
- Political position: Centre (Note: Some sources have described DIP as centre to centre-right.)

- Democratic Independent Party
- Hangul: 민주독립당
- Hanja: 民主獨立黨
- RR: Minju dongnipdang
- MR: Minju tongniptang

Democratic Independent Party (DIP; Korean: 민주독립당) was a centrist political party in both North and South Korea. The party was established on 19 October 1947. Its initiators were An Jae-hong, Kim Byung-ro, Hong Myong-hui, Kim Ho, Pak Yong-hee, Yi Kuk-no and Kim Won-yong. Hong became chairman of the party.

The DIP opposed Syngman Rhee's single-candidate government and supported Kim Ku and Kim Kyu-sik's North-South negotiation position, but after the 1948 North-South Joint Conference, it split into pro-North and 'Yang Kim' factions, and after several mass defections from the party, it transformed into a minor pro-North party. It participated in elections in North Korea from 1948 until at least 1962.

== Electoral history ==
=== Supreme People's Assembly elections ===
Supreme People's Assembly
Election	Seats	+/–
1948	20 / 572	▲20
1957	1 / 215	▼19
1962	1 / 383	Steady

== See also ==
- Politics of North Korea
- List of political parties in North Korea
- Elections in North Korea
- Politics of South Korea
- List of political parties in South Korea
- Elections in South Korea
