= 1st Standing Committee of the Supreme People's Assembly of North Korea =

1st Standing Committee
- Sign of the Supreme People's Assembly

10 September 1948 – 18 September 1957 (9 years, 8 days) Overview
- Type: Standing Committee of the Supreme People's Assembly
- Election: 1st Session of the 1st Supreme People's Assembly
- Replenishment: 4th Session of the 1st Supreme People's Assembly

Leadership
- Chairman: Kim Tu-bong
- Vice Chairmen: Kim Ung-gi; Yi Kuk-no; Hong Nam-pyo; Hong Ki-ju

Members
- Total: 21

The 1st Standing Committee of the Supreme People's Assembly (SPA) was elected by the 1st Session of the 1st Supreme People's Assembly on 10 September 1948. It was replaced on 20 September 1957 by the 2nd SPA Standing Committee.

== Members ==
=== 1st Session (1948–53) ===
Rank	Name	Hangul	6th SES	Positions
1	Kim Tu-bong	김두봉	Reelected	Chairman of the Standing Committee of the Supreme People's Assembly
2	Hong Nam-pyo	홍남표	Dead	Vice Chairman of the Standing Committee of the Supreme People's Assembly
3	Hong Ki-ju	홍기주	Demoted	Vice Chairman of the Standing Committee of the Supreme People's Assembly
4	Kang Yang-uk	강량욱	Reelected	Secretary-General of the Standing Committee of the Supreme People's Assembly
5	Kang Chin-gon	강양욱	Reelected	—
6	Song Chu-sik	송주식	Reelected	—
7	Ku Chae-su	구채수	Demoted	—
8	Yi Ku-hun	이구훈	Reelected	—
9	Pak Chong-ae	박정애	Reelected	—
10	Kim Chang-jun	김창준	Reelected	—
11	Chang Sun-myong	장선명	Reelected	—
12	Chang Kwon	권창	Reelected	—
13	Yu Yong-jun	유용준	Reelected	—
14	Pak Yun-gil	박윤길	Demoted	—
15	Na Sung-gyu	나성규	Reelected	—
16	Choe Kyong-dok	최경독	Demoted	—
17	Yi Nung-jong	이능종	Demoted	—
18	Kim Pyong-je	김평제	Reelected	—
19	Yi Ki-yong	리기영	Reelected	—
20	Kang Sun	강선	Demoted	—
21	Cho Un	조은	Demoted	—

=== 6th Session (1953–57) ===
Rank	Name	Hangul	1st SES	2nd STC	Positions
1	Kim Tu-bong	김두봉	Old	Demoted	Chairman of the Standing Committee of the Supreme People's Assembly
2	Kim Ung-gi	김웅기	New	Demoted	Vice Chairman of the Standing Committee of the Supreme People's Assembly
3	Yi Kuk-no	이국노	New	Reelected	Vice Chairman of the Standing Committee of the Supreme People's Assembly
4	Kang Yang-uk	강양욱	Old	Reelected	Secretary-General of the Standing Committee of the Supreme People's Assembly
5	Kang Chin-gon	강진곤	Old	Reelected	—
6	Song Chu-sik	송주식	Old	Reelected	—
7	Yi Ku-hun	이구훈	Old	Demoted	—
8	Pak Chong-ae	박정애	Old	Reelected	—
9	Kim Chang-jun	김창준	Old	Demoted	—
10	Chang Sun-myong	장선명	Old	Demoted	—
11	Chang Kwon	권창	Old	Demoted	—
12	Yu Yong-jun	유용준	Old	Demoted	—
13	Na Sung-gyu	나성규	Old	Demoted	—
14	Kim Pyong-je	김평제	Old	Reelected	—
15	Yi Ki-yong	이기용	Old	Demoted	—
16	Choe Won-taek	최원택	New	Demoted	—
17	Won Hong-gu	원홍구	New	Reelected	—
18	Kang Ung-jin	원홍구	New	Dead	—
19	Chon Yun-do	전윤도	New	Demoted	—
20	Yu Hae-bung	유해붕	New	Demoted	—
21	Mun Tu-jae	문투재	New	Demoted	—
—	Yi Man-gyu	이만규	New	Reelected	—
