= 2nd Standing Committee of the Supreme People's Assembly =

2nd Standing Committee
- Sign of the Supreme People's Assembly

20 September 1957 – 22 October 1962 (5 years, 32 days) Overview
- Type: Standing Committee of the Supreme People's Assembly
- Election: 1st Session of the 2nd Supreme People's Assembly
- Replenishment: 4th, 6th and 9th sessions of the 2nd Supreme People's Assembly

Leadership
- Chairman: Choe Yong-gon
- Vice Chairmen: Yi Kuk-no; Hyon Chil-chong; Kim Won-bong; Han Sol-ya; Ko Chun-taek; Paek Nam-un

Members
- Total: 21

The 2nd Standing Committee of the Supreme People's Assembly (SPA) was elected by the 1st Session of the 2nd Supreme People's Assembly on 20 September 1957. It was replaced on 23 October 1962 by the 3rd SPA Standing Committee.

== Members ==
=== 1st Session (1957–58) ===
| Rank | Name | Hangul | 1st STC | 4th SES | Positions |
|---|---|---|---|---|---|
| 1 | Choe Yong-gon | 최용건 | New | Renewed | Chairman of the Standing Committee of the Supreme People's Assembly |
| 2 | Yi Kuk-no | 이국노 | Old | Renewed | Vice Chairman of the Standing Committee of the Supreme People's Assembly |
| 3 | Hyon Chil-chong | 현칠종 | New | Demoted | Vice Chairman of the Standing Committee of the Supreme People's Assembly |
| 4 | Kim Won-bong | 김원봉 | New | Demoted | Vice Chairman of the Standing Committee of the Supreme People's Assembly |
| 5 | Kang Yang-uk | 강량욱 | Old | Renewed | Secretary-General of the Standing Committee of the Supreme People's Assembly |
| 6 | Pak Chong-ae | 박정애 | Old | Renewed | — |
| 7 | Kang Chin-gon | 강진곤 | Old | Renewed | — |
| 8 | Song Chu-sik | 송주식 | Old | Renewed | — |
| 9 | Kim Pyong-je | 김평제 | Old | Renewed | — |
| 10 | Won Hong-gu | 원홍구 | Old | Renewed | — |
| 11 | Yi Man-gyu | 이만규 | Old | Renewed | — |
| 12 | Yi Song-un | 이송운 | New | Renewed | — |
| 13 | Han Sang-du | 한상두 | New | Renewed | — |
| 14 | Kim Chang-dok | 김창독 | New | Renewed | — |
| 15 | Jong Ro-sik | 종노식 | New | Renewed | — |
| 16 | Kim Chon-hae | 김천해 | New | Renewed | — |
| 17 | Ha Ang-chon | 김천해 | New | Renewed | — |
| 18 | Chang Hae-u | 장해우 | New | Renewed | — |
| 19 | Kye Ung-sang | 계웅상 | New | Renewed | — |
| 20 | Yi Myon-sang | 이면상 | New | Renewed | — |
| 21 | Song Yong | 송용 | New | Renewed | — |

=== 4th Session (1958–59) ===
| Rank | Name | Hangul | 1st SES | 6th SES | Positions |
|---|---|---|---|---|---|
| 1 | Choe Yong-gon | 최용건 | Old | Renewed | Chairman of the Standing Committee of the Supreme People's Assembly |
| 2 | Yi Kuk-no | 이국노 | Old | Renewed | Vice Chairman of the Standing Committee of the Supreme People's Assembly |
| 3 | Han Sol-ya | 한병도 | New | Renewed | Vice Chairman of the Standing Committee of the Supreme People's Assembly |
| 4 | Ko Chun-taek | 고춘택 | New | Demoted | Vice Chairman of the Standing Committee of the Supreme People's Assembly |
| 5 | Kang Yang-uk | 강량욱 | Old | Renewed | Secretary-General of the Standing Committee of the Supreme People's Assembly |
| 6 | Pak Chong-ae | 박정애 | Old | Renewed | — |
| 7 | Kang Chin-gon | 강진곤 | Old | Renewed | — |
| 8 | Song Chu-sik | 송주식 | Old | Demoted | — |
| 9 | Kim Pyong-je | 김평제 | Old | Renewed | — |
| 10 | Won Hong-gu | 원홍구 | Old | Renewed | — |
| 11 | Yi Man-gyu | 이만규 | Old | Renewed | — |
| 12 | Yi Song-un | 이송운 | Old | Renewed | — |
| 13 | Han Sang-du | 한상두 | Old | Renewed | — |
| 14 | Kim Chang-dok | 김창독 | Old | Renewed | — |
| 15 | Chong No-sik | 종노식 | Old | Renewed | — |
| 16 | Kim Chon-hae | 김천해 | Old | Renewed | — |
| 17 | Ha Ang-chon | 김천해 | Old | Renewed | — |
| 18 | Chang Hae-u | 장해우 | Old | Renewed | — |
| 19 | Kye Ung-sang | 계웅상 | Old | Renewed | — |
| 20 | Yi Myon-sang | 이면상 | Old | Renewed | — |
| 21 | Song Yong | 송용 | Old | Renewed | — |

=== 6th Session (1959–61) ===
| Rank | Name | Hangul | 4th SES | 9th SES | Positions |
|---|---|---|---|---|---|
| 1 | Choe Yong-gon | 최용건 | Old | Reelected | Chairman of the Standing Committee of the Supreme People's Assembly |
| 2 | Yi Kuk-no | 이국노 | Old | Demoted | Vice Chairman of the Standing Committee of the Supreme People's Assembly |
| 3 | Han Sol-ya | 김원봉 | Old | Renewed | Vice Chairman of the Standing Committee of the Supreme People's Assembly |
| 4 | Kang Yang-uk | 강량욱 | Old | Renewed | Vice Chairman of the Standing Committee of the Supreme People's Assembly |
| 5 | Pak Mun-gyu | 박문규 | New | Renewed | Secretary-General of the Standing Committee of the Supreme People's Assembly |
| 6 | Pak Chong-ae | 박정애 | Old | Renewed | — |
| 7 | Kang Chin-gon | 강진곤 | Old | Renewed | — |
| 8 | Kim Pyong-je | 김평제 | Old | Renewed | — |
| 9 | Won Hong-gu | 원홍구 | Old | Renewed | — |
| 10 | Yi Man-gyu | 이만규 | Old | Renewed | — |
| 11 | Yi Song-un | 이송운 | Old | Renewed | — |
| 12 | Han Sang-du | 한상두 | Old | Renewed | — |
| 13 | Kim Chang-dok | 김창독 | Old | Renewed | — |
| 14 | Chong No-sik | 종노식 | Old | Renewed | — |
| 15 | Kim Chon-hae | 김천해 | Old | Renewed | — |
| 16 | Ha Ang-chon | 김천해 | Old | Renewed | — |
| 17 | Chang Hae-u | 장해우 | Old | Renewed | — |
| 18 | Kye Ung-sang | 계웅상 | Old | Renewed | — |
| 19 | Yi Myon-sang | 이면상 | Old | Renewed | — |
| 20 | Song Yong | 송용 | Old | Renewed | — |
| 21 | Kim Kyong-sok | 김경석 | New | Renewed | — |
| 22 | Pak Sin-dok | 박신독 | New | Renewed | — |

=== 9th Session (1961–62) ===
| Rank | Name | Hangul | 6th SES | 3rd STC | Positions |
|---|---|---|---|---|---|
| 1 | Choe Yong-gon | 최용건 | Old | Reelected | Chairman of the Standing Committee of the Supreme People's Assembly |
| 2 | Paek Nam-un | 이국노 | New | Reelected | Vice Chairman of the Standing Committee of the Supreme People's Assembly |
| 3 | Han Sol-ya | 김원봉 | Old | Demoted | Vice Chairman of the Standing Committee of the Supreme People's Assembly |
| 4 | Kang Yang-uk | 강량욱 | Old | Reelected | Vice Chairman of the Standing Committee of the Supreme People's Assembly |
| 5 | Pak Mun-gyu | 박문규 | Old | Demoted | Secretary-General of the Standing Committee of the Supreme People's Assembly |
| 6 | Pak Chong-ae | 박정애 | Old | Reelected | — |
| 7 | Kang Chin-gon | 강진곤 | Old | Demoted | — |
| 8 | Kim Pyong-je | 김평제 | Old | Demoted | — |
| 9 | Won Hong-gu | 원홍구 | Old | Demoted | — |
| 10 | Yi Man-gyu | 이만규 | Old | Reelected | — |
| 11 | Yi Song-un | 이송운 | Old | Demoted | — |
| 12 | Han Sang-du | 한상두 | Old | Demoted | — |
| 13 | Kim Chang-dok | 김창독 | Old | Reelected | — |
| 14 | Chong No-sik | 종노식 | Old | Demoted | — |
| 15 | Kim Chon-hae | 김천해 | Old | Demoted | — |
| 16 | Ha Ang-chon | 김천해 | Old | Reelected | — |
| 17 | Chang Hae-u | 장해우 | Old | Demoted | — |
| 18 | Kye Ung-sang | 계웅상 | Old | Reelected | — |
| 19 | Yi Myon-sang | 이면상 | Old | Demoted | — |
| 20 | Song Yong | 송용 | Old | Reelected | — |
| 21 | Kim Kyong-sok | 김경석 | Old | Demoted | — |
| 22 | Pak Sin-dok | 박신독 | Old | Reelected | — |
