= Standing Committee of the Workers' Party of South Korea =

The 1st Standing Committee of the Workers' Party of South Korea (WPSK) was elected at the 1st WPSK Congress held in November 1946. It consisted of 14 members and remained active until the merger of WPSK and the Workers' Party of North Korea on 30 June 1949. In between sessions of the Standing Committee, the Political Committee met in its place.

== Members ==
=== Political Committee(정치위원회) ===
1. Ho Hon as Chairman
2. Pak Hon-yong as Vice Chairman
3. Yi Ki-sok as Vice Chairman
4. Kim Sam-yong (김삼용)
5. Yi Chu-ha (이주하)
6. Yi Sung-yop (이승엽)
7. Ku Chae-su (구재수)
8. Kim Yong-am (김용암)

=== Standing Committee(사무국) ===
1. Ho Hon as Chairman
2. Pak Hon-yong as Vice Chairman
3. Yi Ki-sok as Vice Chairman
4. Kim Sam-yong
5. Yi Chu-ha
6. Yi Sung-yop
7. Ku Chae-su
8. Kim Yong-am
9. Yi Hyon-sang
10. Kang Mun-sok
11. Ko Chan-bo
12. Yu Yong-jun
13. Kim O-song
14. Song Ul-su
