= Yi Yong =

Yi Yong may refer to:

- Yi Yong, personal name of Grand Prince Anpyeong, calligrapher, poet, and painter
- Yi Yong (politician), Korean independence activist and politician
