= Pak Chang-ok =

North Korean politician (1896–1960)

Vice Premier of the Cabinet
- In office 23 March 1954 – 23 September 1956 Serving with Pak Hon-yong, Hong Myong-hui, Ho Ka-i, Choe Chang-ik, Choe Yong-gon, Pak Ui-wan and Kim Il.
- Premier: Kim Il-sung

Chairman of the State Planning Commission
- In office 23 March 1954 – 16 January 1956
- Premier: Kim Il-sung
- Preceded by: Chong Chun-taek
- Succeeded by: Ri Jong-ok

Personal details
- Born: 1896 Onsong County, Joseon
- Died: 1960 (aged 63–64) Pyongyang, North Korea
- Awards: Order of the Patriotic War (Second Class); Medal "For the Victory over Japan"; Order of the National Flag (First Class)
- Alias: Choe Chang-sok, Choe Chang-sun, Choe Tong-u, Ri Kon-u

Military service
- Branch/service: Soviet Armed Forces; Korean People's Army
- Years of service: 1944–?
- Rank: Major General (Note: May have been promoted later)
- Unit: Political Department
- Commands: Propaganda and Agitation Office, Political Department
- Battles/wars: World War II; Korean War

Korean name
- Hangul: 박창옥
- Hanja: 朴昌玉
- RR: Bak Changok
- MR: Pak Ch'angok

Pak Chang-ok (Korean: 박창옥, 1896–1960) was a North Korean official and was a leader of the Soviet Korean faction of the Workers' Party of Korea (WPK), with members being mainly ethnic Koreans born in Soviet Union, after the suicide of their first leader, Ho Ka-i.

== Career ==
According to Russian sources however, he was born in 1909 to a family of farmers in a Korean settlement in the Russian Far East. After graduating from high school in 1924, Pak worked in agriculture. From 1929, he studied at the pedagogical technical school in Nikolsk-Ussuriysky. He served in the Red Army. Leaving military life behind, Pak became a teacher. From 1933, he was a student at the Vladivostok Pedagogical Institute.

In 1937, he was deported to the Kyzyl-Orda region of the Kazakh SSR. He received pedagogical education. In 1941, he joined the All-Union Communist Party. Until 1943, he held various leadership positions in the secondary education system of the Kyzyl-Orda region. From 1943, he was the head of the Propaganda Department of the Chilik District Party Committee. In 1944, he was sent to a partisan detachment in Manchuria to work among the local Korean population against Japanese troops.

Information from the CIA stated that he was a "former propaganda chief of the Ukrainian Communist Party... one of the highest ranking Koreans in the USSR." The agency reported his transfer to Korea in around 1947 to supervise the land reform program that had been botched by O Ki-sop. Pak was initially said to be a supporter of Kim Il-sung. Other sources gave the approximate date as 1945.

On 19 December 1950, Pak was identified as head of the Bureau of Propaganda and Agitation, an organization nominally subjected to the Central Party Committee but, in reality, was under the Politburo's control. He was then a member of the Central Committee of the Democratic Front. In late December 1952, US intelligence recorded Pak Chang-ok's military position as Deputy Director of the Political Department at the Korean People's Army's General Headquarters with the rank of Major General. Following Stalin's death, the Nongmin Sinmun published a list of North Korean leaders who paid their tribute at the Soviet embassy, with Pak Chang-ok being one of them. He assumed the position of Vice Chairman of the Central Committee of the Workers' Party of Korea and was conferred the Order of the National Flag, First Class, on 29 July 1953. Pak had been awarded the Order of the Patriotic War, Second Class, and the Medal "For the Victory over Japan" by the USSR for his contributions throughout World War II.

Pak was a member of the Central Committee of the WPK, and the Chairman of the State Planning Commission. He was appointed Vice-Premier of North Korea in March 1954. On 20 April, an announcement from Radio Pyongyang confirmed Pak concurrently serving as Chairman of the State Planning Commission. The same day saw him announcing the Three-Year People's Economic Reconstruction and Development Plan at the 7th plenary session of the Supreme People's Assembly. Pak appeared to accept Kim's new "Self-Reliance" ideology very cautiously. Thus, he and his friend Chong Sang-jin were among those criticized by leader Kim Il-sung.

== Fall from power ==
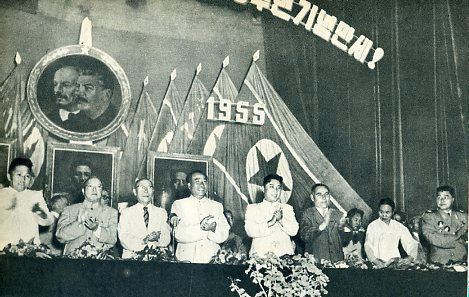
From left to right: Pak Chang-ok, Li Jishen, Kim Tu-bong, Zhu De, Kim Il Sung, Averky Aristov, Pak Chŏng Ae, and Choe Yong-gon in 1955.

Pak formed an alliance with Choe Chang-ik and the Yan'an Korean faction of the party to criticize Kim Il-sung in 1956, but was expelled following Kim's return from the Soviet Union. According to the CIA, the two felt emboldened to act by Khrushchev's criticism of personality cults, Kim's inability to resolve the post-war economic and food crisis and then wavering confidence in his rule from the general populace. Pak was later viciously denounced for his views on Party policies. He died in 1960.

Dr. Selivanov of Kursk State University believed that it is highly likely Pak met the firing squad at some point, but Kim Il-sung displayed courtesy by extending the last favor toward his relatives, sending them back from the Democratic People's Republic of Korea to the Soviet Union via the Soviet embassy.

== Bibliography ==
- Tertitskiy, Fyodor (June 14, 2024). "Pak Ch'ang-ok: Kim Il-sung's (equally) evil twin". The Forgotten Political Elites of North Korea: Woe to the Vanquished. Abingdon-on-Thames: Routledge. pp. 160–179. ISBN 9781032745473.
