= Ho Ka-i =

Soviet North Korean politician (1908–1953)

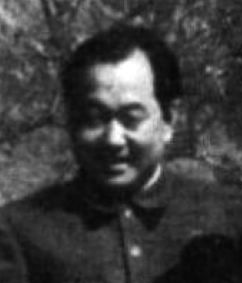

Vice Premier of the Cabinet
- In office 4 November 1951 – 2 July 1953 Serving with Pak Hon-yong, Hong Myong-hui, Kim Chaek, Choe Chang-ik and Choe Yong-gon.
- Premier: Kim Il Sung

First Secretary of the Central Committee of the Communist Party of Korea
- In office 10 December 1928 – 25 April 1932
- 2nd Secretary: Yi Sung-yop
- Preceded by: Nam Man Chun
- Succeeded by: Kim Il Sung
- 3rd Secretary: Kim Sam-yong

Personal details
- Born: 18 March 1908 Khabarovsk, Russian Empire
- Died: 2 June 1953 (aged 45) Pyongyang, North Korea
- Spouses: Anna Innokentevna Li (m. 1927; died 1947); Nina Tsoi (m. 1949)
- Occupation: Politician

Korean name
- Hangul: 허가이
- Hanja: 許哥誼
- RR: Heo Gai
- MR: Hŏ Kai

Alexei Ivanovich Hegai (Russian: Алексей Иванович Хегай; 18 March 1908 – 2 July 1953), also known as Ho Ka-i (Korean: 허가이), was a Soviet political operative in North Korea (DPRK) and leader of the Soviet Korean faction within the early political structure of North Korea. He was the second vice-chairman of the WRK Politburo from 1949 until he was purged. He allegedly killed himself in Pyongyang and was replaced as leader by Pak Chang-ok.

== Early life ==
Aleksei Ivanovich Hegai, also known as Ho Ka-i, was born on 18 March 1908 in Khabarovsk in Russia. His father was a teacher at a Korean school in the Russian Empire. Ho Ka-i was never given a Korean name when he was born, unlike many Russian Koreans. His Korean name is assumed to be an adaptation of his Russian family name.

He was orphaned at a young age; his mother died in 1911 and a few months later his father died by suicide. Ho Ka-i and his younger brother were raised by their uncle, who worked as a digger in gold fields in Khabarovsk. In 1920, at the age of twelve, Ho Ka-i began working at a tobacco factory in Khabarovsk to bring in some money to help support the family.

Ho Ka-i started to get involved in communist politics, as a way for his family to try to get out of the lower class. Many citizens who were impoverished, found that by being actively involved in the Communist Party, their family would be elevated. Throughout the 1920s, Ho Ka-i attended conferences and meetings in the USSR and at the age of 22, he joined the Communist Party. Not long after Ho Ka-i joined the Communist Party, he became well known for his intelligence and remarkable organizational skills, soon becoming the secretary of the Far Eastern committee of the Soviet Communist Youth League.

At the age of nineteen, he married a Soviet Korean, Anna Innokentevna Li, and they would eventually have five children, forcing him to abandon his studies in order to support his family. Working under the Communist Party, he served as secretary for many years, upgrading his family out of the lower class because of his dedication and his service to the party.

In 1933, Ho Ka-i left for Moscow, studying at the Sverdlov All-Union Communist Agriculture University. However, on 10 July 1935, he left university due to "family reasons." In 1937, when Stalin's purges of upper- and middle-class party leaders became common; it was a miracle that he was not purged. The purges took place mainly because Stalin took the elites "relative independence and freedom of mind" as a threat to his own power. But towards the end of 1937, Ho Ka-i became very paranoid and had a bag ready at the door, for his impending arrest. Yet, Ho Ka-i was never arrested.

During the years leading up to his departure to Korea, Ho Ka-i took his family to Yangiyul, Uzbekistan, while he was being cleared to be reinstated to full Party membership, after his and many others' expulsion due to the purges. Eventually, he was found innocent and reinstated, though it took a number of years for him to get back to his previous position in the Party. By 1945, he alongside a dozen other men, were sent by Soviet authorities to the Far East to serve as translators between Russia and Korea. Yet, when he arrived, he was instead placed in a leadership role within the Workers' Party of North Korea.

== Pre-Korean War ==
Ho Ka-i was sent to Korea to help create the Communist Party there. In 1946, Ho Ka-i, alongside Kim Il Sung, Kim Tu-bong, Chu Yong-ha, and Choe Chang-ik made up the Political Committee, which was formed to decide the new leader of the government. Ho Ka-i was elected to represent the Soviet Occupation Authorities.

At a Second Party Congress Session from March 27 to 30, 1948, Ho Ka-i delivered an unscheduled speech, condemning some officials, who had previously apologized, for not admitting their mistakes. Ho Ka-i accused O Ki-sŏp and Ch'oe Young-dal for being prideful and defending themselves at the cost of party progress, going so far as to accuse O Ki Sŏp of his attitude and individual heroism. Being accused of individual heroism was dishonorable because being part of a communist regime; the emphasis was on the whole, and not on the individual person. By not admitting their mistakes, Ho Ka-i said their apologies were not valid and just empty words. Ho Ka-i claimed that because they had apologized without admitting that they were wrong, the men were just doing what they were supposed to and not really sorry and thus, would make the same decisions again.

In Korea, Ho Ka-i rapidly moved up the ranks of the North Korean communist leadership. At the third plenum of the Second Central Committee from September 24 to 25, 1948, Ho Kai replaced Chu Yong-ha as the vice-chairman of the party as well as the chairman of the inspection committee, where Kim Il Sung was the chairman. On 24 June 1949, the first joint plenum of the two central committees of the Workers' Party of North and South Korea occurred as Kim Il Sung was formally elected chairman of the Workers' Party and Ho Ka-i as second vice-chairman as well as first secretary. The Soviet authorities thought Ho Ka-i to be an expert in organization, causing him to move up in party ranks. Ho Ka-i was third in ranking, only behind the chairman and Pak Hon-yong, the vice-chairman. During this time, Ho Ka-i married his second wife, after his first wife died in Pyongyang in 1947 of tuberculosis. Nina Tsoi and Ho Ka-i were married on 1 January 1949. Nina Tsoi was the daughter of Piotr Invanovich (Ch'oe Pyo-dok), a Korean officer in the Red Army who "survived the mass terror of 1937-9."

== Ho Ka-i and Kim Il Sung's confrontation ==
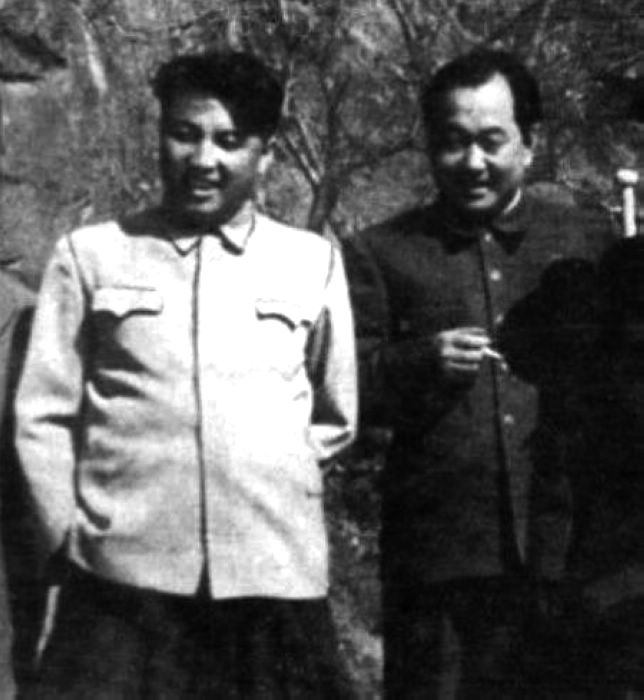
Kim Il Sung and Ho Ka-i

In September 1951, Kim Il Sung and Ho Ka-i had a dispute over how to reorganize the tattered party and how to handle party members who were not completely loyal. The party was split on how they should set up its government and what sort of actions they should take in doing so.

Kim Il Sung said that the Korean War had helped to distinguish between the loyal and disloyal members of the party and those who went against the party should be punished via legal channels, avoiding any indiscriminate purges. Ho Ka-i, who was the chair of the inspection committee, did the exact opposite, conducting indiscriminate purges of low-ranking party members to check their loyalty to the Party. Numbers from North Korea suggest that Ho Ka-i expelled and punished over 450,000 of the party's 600,000 members during the war. Kim Il Sung felt that Ho Ka-i was using harsh measures, punishing any member who failed to show the newly issued membership card, but Ho Ka-i failed to cooperate.

The main issue between the two men was whether to build an elite communist party that takes after the Soviet Union or a mass party which the Soviet occupation authorities had suggested. Ho Ka-i opted to follow the Soviet Union model while Kim Il Sung wanted the mass party which the Soviet occupation authorities suggested. Ho Ka-i, according to Kim Il Sung at a later date, had desired an elite communist party while Kim wanted a strong mass party that built up all of the country's unique features.

Later, Kim Il Sung reinstated all the expelled members and Ho Ka-i, instead was purged. Kim Il Sung took advantage of Ho Ka-i's misfortune, ridiculing Ho Ka-i about party matters as well as accusing him of being secretive and acting on personal heroism.

In November 1951, Ho Ka-i was removed from his posts. This act greatly weakened the influence of Soviet Koreans, men who were sent from the USSR to help implement their power into the new Korean country, which was part of the goal of Kim Il Sung, in order to transition into power. But Kim Il Sung did not completely remove Ho Ka-i from political influence, appointing Ho Ka-i as deputy prime minister. Kim Il Sung and his followers wanted Ho Ka-i out of that position, accusing him of many dishonorable actions such as Ho Ka-i's secret desire to become dictator, his individual heroism and ignoring the needs of Korea but concerned only with his own gain. At the sixth joint plenum of the Central Committee on 4 August 1953, it was reported that Ho Ka-i had killed himself. Official reports show that he was reported dead on 2 July 1953 at 9:30pm.

== See also ==
- Koryo-saram
- Deportation of Koreans in the Soviet Union

== Bibliography ==
- Lankov, Andrei (2002), From Stalin To Kim Il Sung: The Formation of North Korea 1945-1960, Rutgers University Press, ISBN 1-85065-563-4
- Lankov, Andrei (2013), The Real North Korea, Oxford University Press, ISBN 978-0-19-996429-1
- Park, Jae-Kyu; Kim, Jung- Gun (1979), The Politics of North Korea, Westview Press, ISBN 0-86531-653-8
- Suh, Dae-Sook (1988), Kim Il Sung The North Korean Leader, Columbia University Press, ISBN 0-23106-573-6
- Tertitskiy, Fyodor (June 14, 2024), "Aleksei Hegay and his mysterious death", The Forgotten Political Elites of North Korea: Woe to the Vanquished, Abingdon-on-Thames: Routledge, pp. 100–113, ISBN 9781032745473

=== Further reading ===
- Szalontai, Balazs (2005), Kim Il Sung in the Khrushchev Era, Stanford University Press, ISBN 0-80475-322-9

Party political offices
Preceded by Nam Man Chun	First Secretary of the Communist Party of Korea; 1928–1932	Succeeded by Kim Il Sung
