= Students' Day =

Students' Day may refer to:

- International Students' Day, observed annually on 17 November
- Student Day (Iran)
- Student Day (South Korea)
- Students' Day (Maharashtra)
- Tatiana Day or Students Day, Russia
