= Yi Yong (politician) =

Korean independence activist (1888–1954)

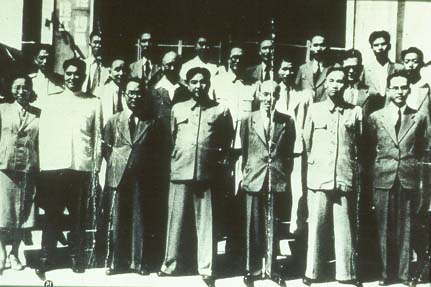
- Yi Yong standing the third from the right in the third column

Minister of Urban Management of North Korea
- In office September 1948 – ?
- Premier: Kim Il Sung
- Succeeded by: ?

Personal details
- Born: April 7, 1888 Bukcheong, South Hamgyong Province, Joseon
- Died: August 18, 1954 (aged 66)
- Party: Workers' Party of Korea

Yi Yong (Korean: 이용; April 7, 1888 – August 18, 1954) was a Korean Independence activist and politician. He was the son of Yi Tjoune. He used the pseudonym Yi Chongsong. Following the official proclamation of the Democratic People's Republic of Korea, he was appointed to the first Minister of Urban Management in the North Korean Cabinet led by Premier of North Korea, Kim Il Sung.

== Biography ==
Born in Bukcheong, South Hamgyong Province, the son of Yi Jun, famous for the Hague Secret Incident. He followed his father to Seoul and went to Boseong College, but when he heard that his father was self-determined, he dropped out of school. After the Japanese oppression made domestic activities difficult, he fled to Vladivostok in 1910. In August 1911, he went to the northeastern region of China and watched the secretary of the Korean People's Association of the Korean National Residents' Association. After graduating from the Zhejiang Physical Education School in Zhejiang Province, China, he graduated from the artillery department of the Army Military Academy in Zhejiang Province in 1918 and served as the 8th Regiment of the Zhejiang Province Army. did. In April 1919, he became a central member of the military division of the Shinmindan and the Korean Socialist Party held near Vladivostok. In 1920, he was appointed as the commander of the East Road by the Provisional Government of the Republic of Korea to prepare for the construction of a military academy under the National Assembly of the Republic of Korea while striving to integrate anti-Japanese armed forces in North Korea.

He also participated in the Battle of Fengwudong and the Battle of Qingshanli in October. The Japanese troops defeated in the Fengwudong battle and the Qingshanli Battle colluded with the miracles, manipulated the "Hunchun Incident" and dispatched enormous troops with it. In response to the Gando attacks that led to the Japanese military's great battles and massacres, it passed to Russian territory in late 1920s. In January 1921, the Communist Party of Korea was appointed chairman of the Provisional Military Service by the Korean Ministry of Far East. In March, he was elected as a military member of the Korean Medical Corps at the Korean Medical Association held in Masanov, Amur, to converge the elderly and Manchurian Korean armed forces. At the time of the disarmament of the Korean Medical Corps in June (censored at the time of freedom), he was captured by Russian troops and escaped while being seized in Irkutsk in July and fled to the Iman province, the neutral region between the Far East and the Japanese interference forces. In October, in Iman, the Korean Medical and Jeonhan Military Committees were rebuilt by the Armed Forces Army and became the Commander of the Korean Medical Army. At the end of November, the White Guards of Mozanov, stationed south of the Ussuri Railway Bridge, flew over the neutral zone to occupy Khabarovsk, fought over the Neutral Zone, fought with the Korean Revolutionary Army and cooperated with the People's Revolutionary Army of the Far Eastern Republic. From the end of November 1921 to February of the following year, he participated in the Battle of Imancheolgyo Bridge, the Battle of Notchgau, the Battle of Ulazimirovska, the Battle of Ingol, the Battle of Oligokt, and the Battle of Bolochaevsk. In September 1922, when the Korean Revolutionary Armed Forces Office, the reunification agency of the Korean Armed Forces, was established, it was designated as the Northern Commander of the General Branch of the Maritime Revolutionary Army.

In 1925, he went to the Revolutionary Base of Guangdong, China with the Soviet Military Advisory Group, and worked at the Artillery Regiment in the National Revolutionary Army of Sandu. In April 1927, he fought against the anti-communist coup of the Chiang Kai-shek. At the time of the Gwangju uprising in December, he participated as the 1st military adviser of the uprising of the Uprising Army and participated in the construction of the land for the offshore wind after the uprising failed.

In 1930, he went to Manchuria and joined the Korea Communist Party Construction Preparation Committee. In May, as a member of the Communist Party's Yanbian Special District, he participated in the 'Gando May 30 Uprising' and subsequent anti-Japanese peasant movements, trying to form the Red Guard and Self-Defense Forces. From October to September 1931, he served as the head of the Communications Department of the Special Committee of the East China. In November of that year, he was arrested by the Japanese police at Joyangcheon and served in the Seodaemun Prison and was subject to residence restrictions in Bukcheong. In November 1936, he entered the Motherland Liberation Society in Bukcheong and undertook underground activities. In November 1944, he formed the Northeast People's Liberation and Politics Committee in Changchun and participated in reconnaissance activities against Japanese military facilities.

=== North Korea ===
After liberation of Korea following the Surrender of Japan, Yi Yong served as the first chairman of the Bukcheong-gun until 1946. In June 1946, along with Li Guk-ro, they opposed the establishment of a single-government government in South Korea. In 1947, he served as a candidate for the New Democratic Party and then voluntarily went north to participate in the April 1948 Inter-Korean Conference. Following the formal proclamation of the Democratic People's Republic of Korea, he was appointed as the first Minister of Urban Management in the North Korean Cabinet led by Premier Kim Il Sung. Then, in December 1951, he was appointed to the Justice Minister, and in 1953 he became a minister without portfolio in the 1st Cabinet of North Korea . Yi Yong died on August 18, 1954, was awarded the National Reunification Prize in 1990, and is currently buried in the Patriotic Martyrs' Cemetery. The Ministry of Veterans Affairs in the South does not advocate the use of independent activists who participated in the North Korean government.
