= Kim Byung-ro =

South Korean judge (1888–1964)

Kim in 1948

Kim Byung-ro (Korean: 김병로; Hanja: 金炳魯, 27 January 1888 – 13 January 1964) was a South Korean independence activist, lawyer, and politician, as well as the first Chief Justice of the Supreme Court of Korea. Under the period of Japanese rule over Korea, he was renowned as one of the three leading national lawyers for the independence movement, along with Ho Hon and Lee In. His clan name was Ulsan Kim, and his art name was Kain (街人).

== Biography ==
Kim Byung-ro was born into a yangban household in Sunchang County, part of modern-day Jeonbuk Special Self-Governing Province. His father, Kim Sang-hui, served in the government as a high-ranking official at the Judicial Office in Hanseong, and he therefore received an education in Confucianism from his grandfather. In 1904, he studied at Ilshin Academy in Damyang County, South Jeolla Province, where he received instruction in new fields of study from Western missionaries, such as arithmetic and Western history.

Following the passage of the Japan–Korea Treaty of 1905 (the Eulsa Treaty), Byung-ro joined the Jeongmi Righteous Army under Choe Ik-hyeon. The following year, he matriculated at Kim Seong-su’s Changheung School, made the decision to study abroad, and in 1910, travelled to Japan to matriculate into the faculty of law at Meiji University (where he took evening classes). In 1912, he was admitted to a three-year advanced research program, from which he graduated in 1915. While abroad, Byung-ro served as secretary-general for the Student Association of Korean students living in Tokyo, and published its associated bulletin, Gaku no Hikari (学之光, Light of Learning).

After returning to Korea, Byung-ro took teaching positions at the Gyeongseong Law School and the Poseong School of Law and Commerce, where he taught courses in criminal and procedural law. In 1919, he was appointed as a judge in the Miryang Branch of the Busan District Court, but he resigned and in 1920, went into practice as a lawyer and became a trustee of the Korean Lawyers Association the following year. Byung-ro then founded the Joint Research Association on Criminal Defense in Insa-dong, Seoul in 1923, primarily handling defenses for the 105-Man Incident, the June 10th Movement, the Peace Preservation Law violations of Lyuh Woon-hyung and Ahn Chang-ho, and other independence movements, such as the Heroic Corps and the Communist Party of Korea. Additionally, he was a member of the Singanhoe and was elected to its Central Executive Committee in 1929. The same year, he took charge of investigating the Gwangju Student Independence Movement, but in 1931, the Singanhoe was forced to dissolve by the Governor-General of Chōsen. As a lawyer, he was also actively involved in tenant farmer disputes and labor disputes.

After Korea regained independence following the Japanese surrender on 15 August 1945, Byung-ro became Chairman of the Korea Democratic Party’s Central Inspection Committee on 21 September, but later split from the party after criticizing its approach to land reform. On 14 February 1946, he was elected Chairman of the Legislative Committee in the Emergency National Congress, and on 27 June that year, he was also appointed to be the first Chief of the Ministry of Justice under the United States Military Government, where he was responsible for the drafting and editing of a new basic legal code. When the country was first split into North and South, Byung-ro was an advocate for Korean unification, but in 1948, he participated in the founding the Republic of Korea, served as Chief Judge of the Special Investigation Committee on Anti-National Activities, and eventually became the first Chief Justice of the Korean Supreme Court.

While holding the position of Chief Justice, Byung-ro protected the independence of the judiciary, advocated for the repeal of the National Security Act, among other things, and stood in opposition against the policies of the Syngman Rhee regime. After retiring as Chief Justice in 1957, he served as a representative of the Association of Lawyers for Freedom, the representative member of the Supreme Council for the Civil Rule Party, and a member of the Supreme Council for the People's Party. In 1962, he was awarded the Order of Cultural Merit and in 1963, the Order of Merit for National Foundation by Korean government.

=== Family ===
Kim Byung-ro was survived by his son-in-law, Constituent National Assembly Member Kim Moon-pyeong; his grandson, the politician Kim Chong-in; and his grandsons-in-law, former Chief Justice of the Constitutional Court Yun Yeong-chul and politician Lee Taek-don. Byung-ro himself was the 15th generation descendant of Kim In-hu and the grandson of Kim Seong-su (the 13th generation descendant of Kim In-hu).
