= Gwangju Student Independence Movement =

1929 protest in Korea against Japan

- Hangul: 광주 학생 독립 운동
- Hanja: 光州學生獨立運動
- RR: Gwangju haksaeng dongnip undong
- MR: Kwangju haksaeng tongnip undong

The Gwangju Student Independence Movement (Korean: 광주 학생 독립 운동; Hanja: 光州學生獨立運動), or Gwangju Student Movement, was a protest in Gwangju between October and November 1929 against the Japanese occupation of Korea. It is considered the second-most important Korean independence movement in the period of the Japanese Occupation of Korea, with the March 1st Movement considered the most important rebellion.

== Background ==
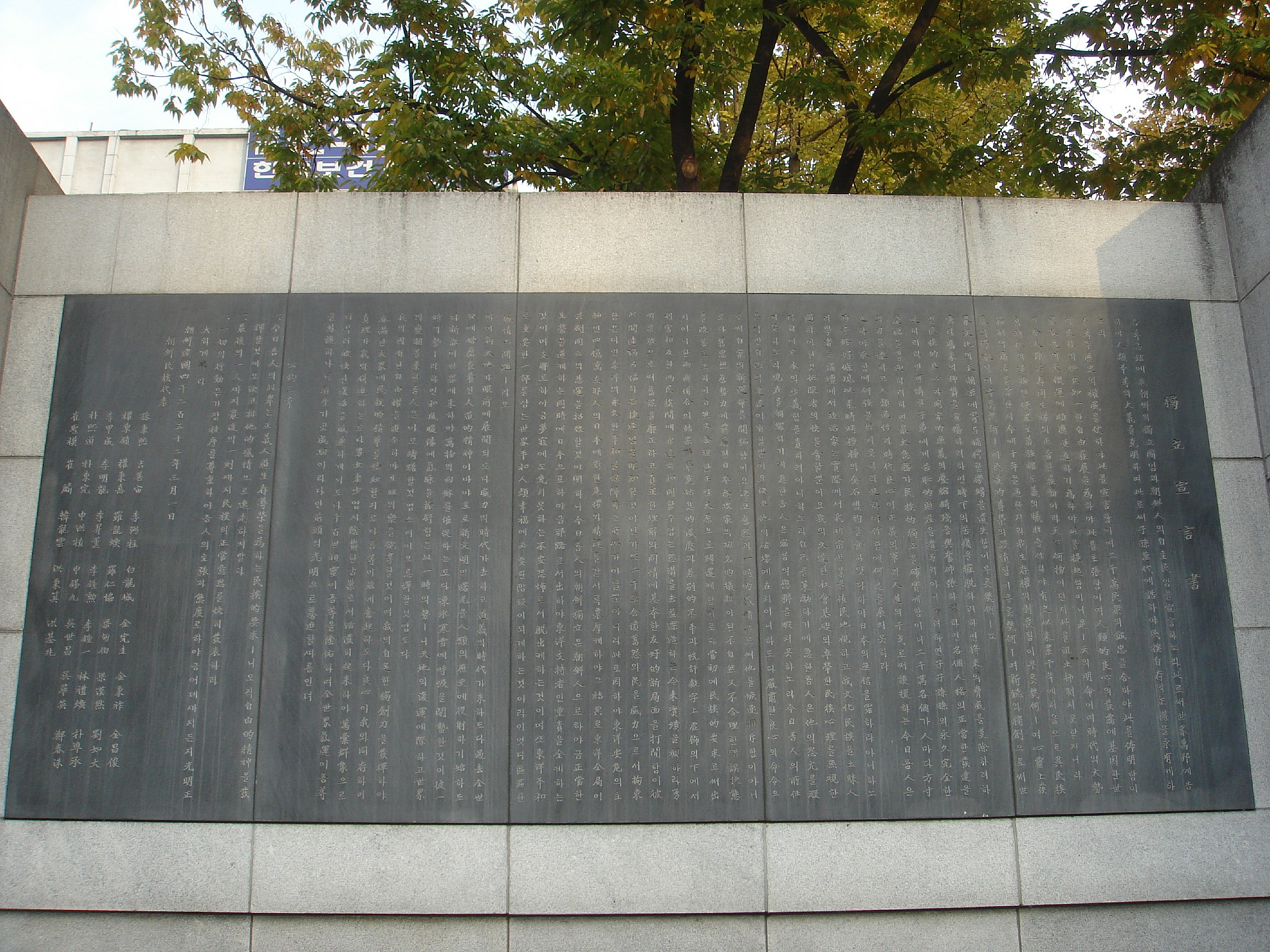
Monument to the March 1st Movement at Tapgol Park (2006)

Shortly after the March 1st Movement, the Provisional Government of the Republic of Korea was established which fostered the independence until liberation from Japan was achieved on . Soon, on 1920, the provisional government led Battle of Qingshanli which is regarded as one of the most successful battles against the Japanese Empire in the independence history of Korea. As a result, the Japan Empire and Japanese General Government responded to this with cruel suppression thus the independence movement faced stalemate. However, as the new clandestine organization for the independence called the Singanhoe was formed in 1927, the independent movement became much more active with clandestine activities. Also, as the Singanhoe embraced various political spectrum in Korea, they could gain much more power to struggle against Japan.

== Timeline ==
=== The first student movement ===
On October 30, 1929, Japanese students in the train station in Naju harassed a few Korean female students. This incident was the initial cause of anti-Japanese demonstrations in various high schools in Gwangju. On November 3 — coincidentally both the birthday of Emperor Meiji (明治節) and Gaecheonjeol (개천절; 開天節), the National Foundation Day of Korea — students were forced to sing the "Kimigayo," the national anthem of Japan and hymn to the Tennō, its emperor. Instead of reluctantly singing it, students remained silent or shouted for independence. Jaeseong Jang, one of those students who participated in this activity, started to lead street demonstrations and insisted students making this protest into part of an ongoing resistance against Japanese rule.

=== The second student movement ===
On November 12, 1929, student groups led by Jaeseong Jang distributed mimeographed copies of requests to participate in the movement. Later, students from a few high schools such as Gwangju Agriculture High School and Gwangju Girls' High School decided go on strike against the Japanese regime. In response, authorities decided to impose suspension on students who participated in the movement. This actually led more people to be encouraged to join the movement. Amongst the slogans the students had, the nationalist and socialist views seemed to be distinct.

== Aftermath ==
While the movement was becoming intense, Seokchun Jang, the head of the Gwangju branch of New People's Association, arrived Seoul to report what happened in Gwangju to leaders of New People's Association. From the two conferences he held, he insisted that this movement should become a nationwide struggle for independence. Soon this idea got accepted, and New People's Association began to prepare for demonstrations in Seoul and other major cities. Even though most leaders in Seoul got arrested by the police before their protests, a few schools continued to have demonstrations. This led to the participation from other major political leaders such as Cho Byeong-ok, Han Yong-un, and Song Jin-woo. Eventually, the number of schools that participated reached 323.

== Historical significance ==
The first student movement arisen on November 3, 1929, developed into a nationwide anti-Japanese movement, and lasted about 5 months. Focusing on students, about 54,000 people engaged in this movement. It spread and affected the rally and protests abroad such as in Manchuria, Kando, Kirn, Shanghai, Beijing of China, Japan and USA. After this, the spirit of the student independence movement succeeded to the secret society movement, resistance movement about oppressive draft, the grain exploitation in 1940s, and the second student independence movement in May, 1943, etc. Like this, the Gwangju student independence movement was the opportunity which identified that the students was the inner circle members of the independence movement and the trigger of the national liberation enhancement in the stagnant atmosphere of labor/peasant movement at the end of the 1920s. For these reasons, the Gwangju independence movement is evaluated as one of the most representative ethnic movements equivalent to the March 1st Movement against the imperialism of Japan.

== Effects ==
Although their protests resulted in the severe repression from the Japanese government, those efforts students made not only encouraged national independence movement, but also became the predecessor of student movements. Sim Hun, the Korean novelist, wrote a collection of poetry Kunali Omyeon (그날이 오면, If that day comes) to commemorate a student independence movement in Gwangju in 1930. In 1953, the National Assembly of South Korea announced the establishment of the Students' Day (학생의 날) to celebrate students' efforts on every November 3. Later, in 2006, this name soon changed into Student Independence Movement Day (학생독립운동 기념일).

== Movement map at a glance ==
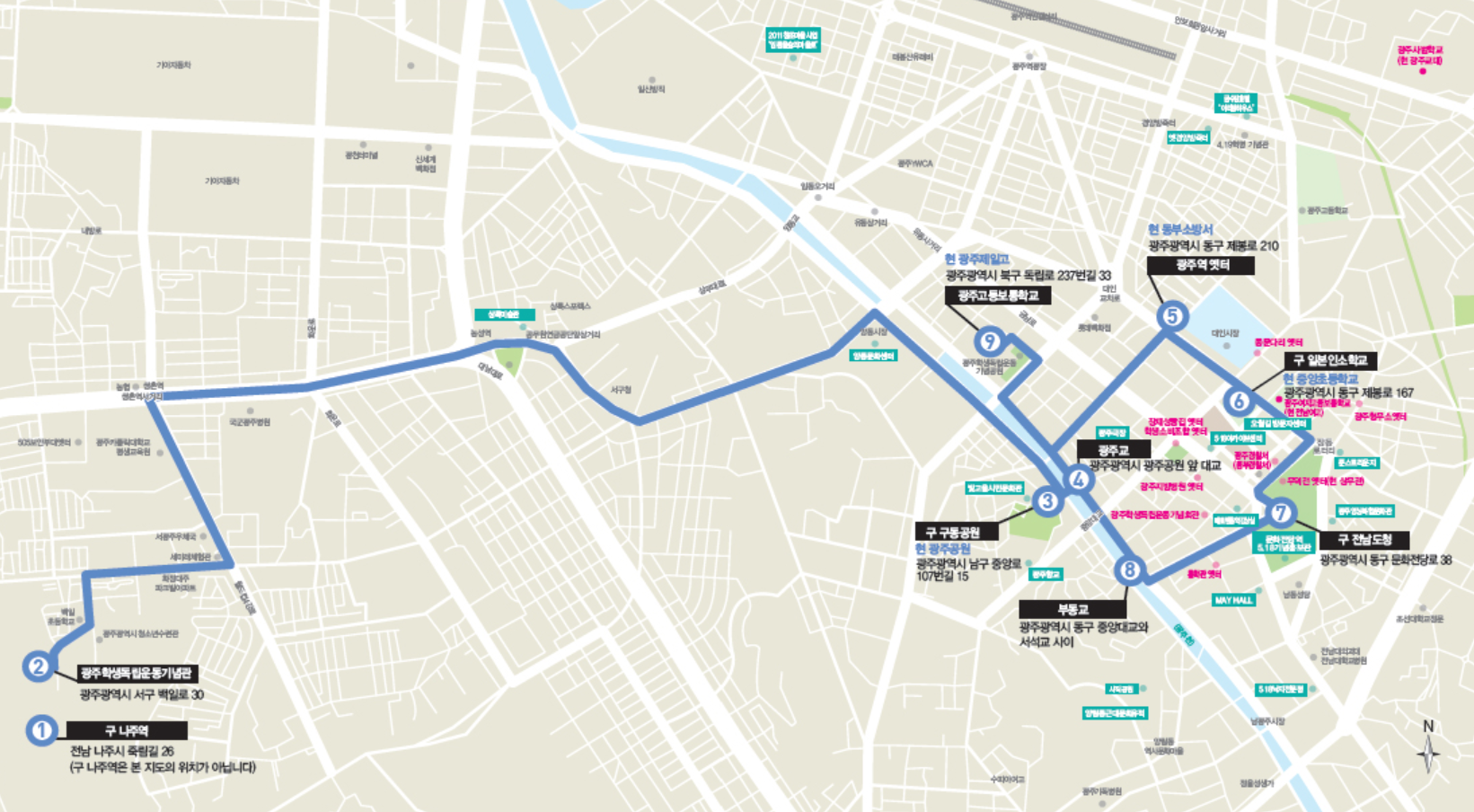
The map of Student Movement

=== 1. Former Naju Station ===
It was the birthplace of the 11.3 school independence movement when Korean and Japanese students collided while attending Gwangju in 1929. There is a background in which Naju students take on Japanese students. At that time, Japanese based in Youngsanpo carried rice from Naju Plain to Japan. The town's commercial district was also controlled by the Japanese. This area is designated as a monument and has a vivid reconstruction of the old scenery of Naju Station.

=== 2. Gwangju Student Independence Movement Memorial Hall ===
In 1967, Gwangju Student Independence Movement Memorial Hall was established in Gwang-dong, Dong-gu, Gwangju Metropolitan City to pay one's respects to independence spirit. In 2004, the Gwangju Student Independence Movement Memorial Hall was newly built in Hwajeong-dong, Seo-gu, Gwangju Metropolitan City. It was opened again in November 2005 by displaying a composite process of the development of Gwangju Student Independence Movement

=== 3. Gudong park ===
Gwangju's first modern park, the Gudong Park(now Gwangju park), was built in 1912–1913 at the summit of Seong-geo Mountain and there were 1,200 pyeong of Gwangju Shrine in the square. On November 3, 1929, it was the birthday of King Meiji the Japanese national day of October 3, the lunar calendar. In the reality that we have to celebrate the Japanese holiday the students rejected singing Kimigayo and shrine worship protested with silence. After the ceremony, there was a conflict between Joseon students and Japanese students, and the violence has been spreading, such as stabbing Choi's face with a dagger.

=== 4. Gwangju bridge ===
Gwangju Bridge, which entered 115 years ago in 1907, was the most modern painted wooden bridge at that time, which was all of stepping-stones and poor wooden bridge. Back then, all the people and cars coming from the south passed through this bridge into the center of Gwangju. Gwangju Bridge was regarded by the Japanese as 'the road to the shrine' and 'to the marketplace' for us. It became a concrete bridge through two reconstruction in 1922 and 1935.

=== 5. Former Site of Gwangju Station ===
About 300 students chanted slogans, 'Hurray for the independence of Korea', 'Down with Japanese imperialism', 'The abolition of colonial education', staging a violent demonstration with the citizenry.

=== 6. Old Japan Primary School ===
Established in 1907, the Japanese elementary school, which was founded in 1907 for the Japanese student education, opened a campus in 1913 and entered in the current jungang elementary school. This was the street demonstration of the Gwangju student uprising. On November 3, 1929, the street demonstration of students from Gwangju High School in Gwangju passed through Chungjong-ro Pass and Seoseok-dong, where student living in a dormitory in Gwangju Normal School and Gwangju Girl's High School joined the demonstrators and Ordinary citizens encouraged demonstrators, scale of demonstrators amount to 30,00 people.

=== 7. Former South Jeolla Provincial Government ===
After the clash in Gwangju Station on November 3, the street march resumed at 2 p.m. The students who poured into the city area raised their momentum by shouting "Long live independence of Korea" and calling the national anthem. Students who protested along Chungjang walked toward Gil-rim-dong, where Gwangju Middle School(Japanese school) is located. They went on shouting slogans such as 'Abolish colonial slave education and 'Shut down the Japanese school Gwangju Middle School.' The protesters went to Seokseong - dong and came back to the city area with the police's restraint. They continued marching along the on way street going to the south academy alley of the Jeonnam provincial government office and the hospital.

=== 8. Budong bridge ===
The students demonstrations attempted to attack Gwangju Middle School, but after avoiding the blood clashes with the police, they crossed the Geumdong and the Gwangju River and crossed Gwangju Bridge descend along Gwagnju Bridge and returned to Gwangju High School. Seonam University Hospital. At that time, a small market placing under Budong bridge. A crowd of thousands gathered here and rallied in the streets. However, at present, the marketplace can not be found, and there is a hospital instead.

=== 9. Gwangju Jeil High school ===
It is the birthplace of the Gwangju students' anti-Japanese movement by organizing a secret society with independence and leading the anti-Japanese protests in Gwangju. The Gwangju Public High School is the current Gwangju Jeil High School and the park site located on the campus has the "Gwangju Student Independence Movement Memorial" built in 1954 to commemorate the student independence movement at that time and the Gwangju Student Independence Movement Memorial History museum' built in 1997. It was designated as the 26th Gwangju Metropolitan City Monument on April 30, 1999. The school campus memorial also has a space for the history of the Gwangju Ilgo baseball club, which was established in 1923.
