= Accidental Tyrant: The Life of Kim Il-sung =

2025 book by Fyodor Tertitskiy

- Cover of the book
- Author: Fyodor Tertitskiy
- Audio read by: Gildart Jackson
- Language: English
- Subject: Kim Il Sung
- Genre: Biography
- Publisher: Hurst Publishers, Oxford University Press
- Publication date: 13 Feb 2025
- Publication place: United Kingdom
- Pages: 352
- Awards: A Financial Times Best Summer History Book 2025; The Week Best History Books to Read (2025)
- ISBN: 978-0197800881

Accidental Tyrant: The Life of Kim Il-sung is a 2025 biography of Kim Il Sung, the first leader of North Korea, written by Fyodor Tertitskiy. It was published by Hurst Publishers in the United Kingdom, and by Oxford University Press in North America.

The book argues that Kim Il Sung's rise to power was driven more by historical contingencies than a deliberate long-term strategy.

== Reviews ==
The book received generally positive reviews from several major publications. The Financial Times included it in its list of the ten "best summer books of 2025 in history", describing it as a "comprehensive biography". The Wall Street Journal also gave a favorable review, calling it a "rare and impressive biographical feat". NK News highlighted the book's use of multilingual sources, referring to it as meticulously researched. The Telegraph gave the book a four-out-of-five-star rating. The Week included the book in its list of "the best history books to read in 2025".

Reviewers noted the book's use of an extensive array of primary and secondary sources in Korean, Chinese, Japanese, and Russian. Several remarked that the book offered new insights into the historical development of North Korea. Asian Review of Books highlighted the author's exploration of alternate historical scenarios, suggesting that Kim Il Sung's fate and Korea's trajectory could have been drastically different.

== Other languages ==
Tertitskiy also wrote Korean and Russian editions of the book, published in 2022 and 2025, respectively.

- 표도르 째르치즈스키 (이휘성) (2022-06-23). 김일성 전기. 파주: 한울아카데미. ISBN 9788946081871.
- Фёдор Тертицкий (2025). Ким Ир Сен: вождь по воле случая. Москва: Альпина нон-фикшн. ISBN 978-5-00223-321-2.
