= Pak Ui-wan =

North Korean politician (1911–c.1961)

- 박의완

Vice Premier of North Korea
- Supreme Leader: Kim Il Sung

Personal details
- Born: Korea, Empire of Japan
- Citizenship: North Korean
- Party: Workers' Party of Korea

Pak Ui-wan (Korean: 박의완; September 19, 1911 – 1961?) was a North Korean politician who served as a Vice Premier of North Korea and member of the Supreme People's Assembly, North Korea's unicameral parliament until he was purged in 1958.

== Biography ==
Born September 19, 1911, in Korea, Empire of Japan, with family moved to the Russian Empire and became Koryo-saram. Some say that his name Ui-wan was changed from Russian Ivan, and some say that his original name was Ui-wan.

After the Russian Revolution, he worked as a secretary for the Soviet Youth League. After graduating from the Rostov State University of Railways, he married Alexandra Lee, a Korean. On June 22, 1937 their son Yuri was born, and Alexandra died in 1938. When the forced migration of Koreans began, Pak Ui-wan was forcibly relocated to the Uzbek SSR. He later remarried a Russian woman named Natalia Gorbatova. Then, after the defeat of the Japanese Empire, he was sent to North Korea under Stalin's instructions. Arriving in December 1945 with other communists, he was appointed deputy director of the railway bureau of the Provisional People's Committee of North Korea, and in 1947 took all of his family to North Korea. Then he divorced Natalia and marries a Goryeo-in, Pyongyang 6 school principal, Yulia Na Kwak.

In September 1948, with the formal establishment of North Korea and the inauguration of the first cabinet, he was appointed as the first minister of transport. was appointed to In February 1951, he served as a member of the funeral commission of Kim Chaek, and in August 1951, he served as a member of the funeral committee of Ho Hon. At the end of 1951, after the Ministry of Transport was reorganized into the Ministry of Railways, he was appointed Minister of Railways. In July 1953, Kim Hoe-il (Korean: 김회일) was given the Railway Ministry, but on July 13, he was appointed deputy prime minister of North Korea. In 1954, he was appointed Vice Premier and Minister of Light Industry. In April 1956, he was elected as a candidate member of the Standing Committee at the 3rd Party Congress. At a plenary meeting in September 1956 he criticized Kim's policies sought to return to the Soviet Union, but the new Soviet ambassador Alexander Puzanov ignored his request. In March 1958, when the 1st Conference of the Workers' Party of North Korea was held, he was attacked fiercely and was expelled along with Kim Tu-bong and O Ki-sop. Following the conference, in accordance with the decree of the Presidium of the Supreme People's Assembly, he was dismissed from the deputy prime minister and replaced by Ri Ju-yon.

== Bibliography ==
- Tertitskiy, Fyodor (June 14, 2024). "Pak Ŭi-wan: Vice-Premier who had a heart". The Forgotten Political Elites of North Korea: Woe to the Vanquished. Abingdon-on-Thames: Routledge. pp. 199–208. ISBN 9781032745473.
