= Andrei Lankov =

Russian and Australian scholar of Korean studies (born 1963)

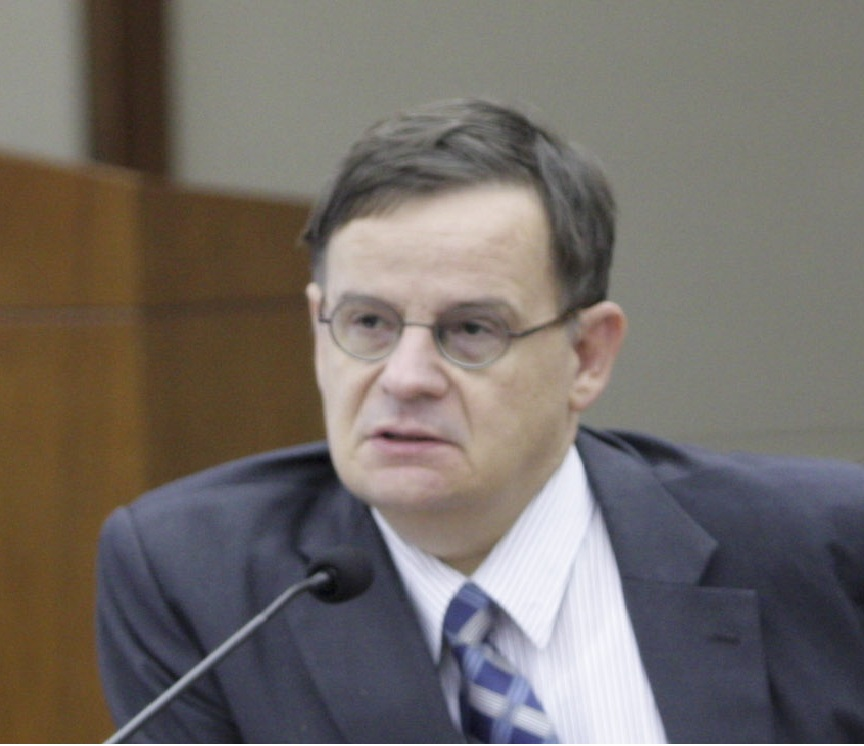
- Lankov in November 2010
- Born: Andrei Nikolaevich Lankov; 26 July 1963 (age 63); Leningrad, Russian SFSR, Soviet Union (now Saint Petersburg, Russia)
- Citizenship: Russia; Australia
- Occupation: Professor at Kookmin University

Academic background
- Education: Leningrad State University

Academic work
- Discipline: International relations, Korean studies
- Main interests: Korean history

Andrei Nikolaevich Lankov (Russian: Андре́й Никола́евич Ланько́в; born 26 July 1963) is a Russo-Australian scholar of Asia and specialist in Korean studies and Director of Korea Risk Group, the parent company of NK News and NK Pro. In the 1990s, he worked in South Korea and Australia, and has been teaching in Seoul since 2004.

== Life and career ==
=== Early years and education ===
Lankov was born on 26 July 1963, in Leningrad, Soviet Union (modern day Saint Petersburg, Russia). He completed undergraduate and graduate degrees at Leningrad State University in 1986 and 1989, respectively. He studied at Kim Il Sung University in Pyongyang for a 10-month period from 1984 to 1985.

=== Career ===
Following his graduate studies, Lankov taught Korean history and language at his alma mater of Leningrad State University, where he was an assistant professor from 1990 to 1992. In 1992, he moved to South Korea for work. He was a lecturer at Chung-Ang University in Seoul from 1992 to 1994 and then at Osan College until 1996. He moved to Australia in 1996 to take up a post at Australian National University in Canberra, where he taught Chinese and Korean studies and history. He moved back to Seoul in 2004 to teach at Kookmin University. Lankov has written in Russian (his native language), Korean, and English. He runs a North Korea–themed Livejournal blog in Russian, where he writes about life in North (and South) Korea, together with his musings and links to his publications. He has written a column for the English-language daily The Korea Times for 15 years and also for Bloomberg News and Al Jazeera English.

Since 2012, Lankov has been a regular contributor to NK News and its premium research platform NK Pro. In May 2017, he became a director of Korea Risk Group, the parent company of these platforms, and committed to writing exclusively for the group outside of his academic commitments.

In 2013, he was invited by then-U.S. President Barack Obama to visit the White House and advise on North Korea policy.

In April 2025, a Moscow court reportedly fined him 10,000 rubles ($130) for participating in the activities of an organization considered “undesirable” in Russia. He had previously expressed critical views of Russia’s invasion of Ukraine.

In 2026, Lankov was detained in Latvia just before he was scheduled to give a lecture. His detention occurred because he had been declared persona non grata a few days prior, a decision he claimed was politically motivated. That same day, he was transferred to the Estonian border.

Lankov has been known for "his cool, realist view of North Korea, which he often describes as a Machiavellian regime squeezing limited resources and manipulating major powers to ensure its survival."

== Bibliography ==
=== Books ===
- Lankov, Andrei (October 2003). From Stalin to Kim Il Sung: The Formation of North Korea, 1945–1960. Rutgers University Press. ISBN 0-8135-3117-9.
- — (December 2004). Crisis in North Korea: The Failure of De-Stalinization, 1956. University of Hawaii Press. ISBN 0-8248-2809-7.
- — (2005). КНДР вчера и сегодня: Неформальная история Северной Кореи [The DPRK Yesterday and Today: An Unofficial History of North Korea] (in Russian). Vostok-Zapad. ISBN 5-478-00060-4.
- — (2006). Быть корейцем (Being Korean) (in Russian). Vostok-Zapad. ISBN 5-17-032481-2.
- — (April 2007). North of the DMZ: Essays on Daily Life in North Korea. McFarland and Company. ISBN 978-0-7864-2839-7.
- — (2008). The Dawn of Modern Korea. EunHaeng NaMu publishing. ISBN 978-89-5660-214-1.
- — (2009). Август, 1956 год. Кризис в Северной Корее (August 1956, A Crisis in North Korea). ROSSPEN. ISBN 978-5-8243-0907-2.
- — (2013). The Real North Korea: Life and Politics in the Failed Stalinist Utopia. Oxford University Press. ISBN 978-0199964291.
