= Student Day (South Korea) =

- Hangul: 학생독립운동 기념일 or 학생의 날
- Hanja: 學生獨立運動記念日 or 學生의 날
- Revised Romanization: Hakseng Doknip Undong ginyeomil or Haksengui nal
- McCune–Reischauer: haksaeng Toknip undong ginyŏm'il or haksaeng'ŭi nal

Student Day (Korean: 학생의 날) is the anniversary of the Student Independence Movement against the Japanese rule of Korea. It occurred in 1929, in the city of Gwangju.

In 1953, the National Assembly of South Korea announced the establishment of "Student Day" as a national holiday, celebrated annually on 3 November. In 2006, the holiday's name was changed to Student Independence Movement Day (Korean: 학생독립운동 기념일).

== See also ==
- Korean independence movement
  - Gwangju Student Independence Movement
  - Gwangbokjeol
