= The Real North Korea =

2013 non-fiction book

The Real North Korea: Life and Politics in the Failed Stalinist Utopia
- First edition
- Author: Andrei Lankov
- Subject: North Korea
- Genre: Non-fiction
- Publisher: Oxford University Press
- Publication date: 2013

The Real North Korea: Life and Politics in the Failed Stalinist Utopia is a 2013 non-fiction book by Andrei Lankov about North Korea. It was published by Oxford University Press.

== Content ==
The work has a total of six chapters.

== Reception ==
Max Fisher of The Washington Post argued the book is best for people who have existing background knowledge of North Korea, and described it as "an excellent primer on the experts’ understanding of North Korea and a fascinating series of insights". Fisher criticised the book for having unnecessary words at times and a "less than electrifying" writing style.

Donghyun Woo of the University of California, Los Angeles wrote that the work is "one of the most informative and useful guidelines" for academic and non-academic viewers, although he criticised "simplistic characterizations and teleological narratives that will likely reinforce unproductive received perceptions".

Publishers Weekly gave the book a starred review, as one of "PW's Picks", and described it as "one of the best and most accessible recent accounts" of North Korea.

Kirkus Reviews describes the book as "A well-reasoned survey".
