= Kang Mun-sok =

Korean socialist activist

- Hangul: 강문석
- Hanja: 姜文錫
- RR: Gang Munseok
- MR: Kang Munsŏk

Kang Mun-sok (Korean: 강문석; 1906–1955) was a Korean socialist activist during the Japanese occupation and thereafter.

Born in Namjeju County on Jeju Province, he became active in the socialist movement in Japan starting in the 1920s. He worked from Shanghai with Pak Hon-yong in the 1930s, and also participated in the Kyongsong Communist Group, remaining loyal to the group throughout the occupation period.

After the end of World War II, in September 1945 he joined Pak's reconstructed Communist Party of Korea, serving as Pak's right hand as head of the publicity department while also working as a cadre of the Communist Party of South Korea. Kang's son-in-law Lee Sung-jin adopted the alias "Kim Tal-sam", previously used by Kang, when he led the Jeju uprising in 1948.

After the Workers Party of South Korea was outlawed by American military government of Korea, Kang moved to North Korea, but is believed to have been purged with other members of the WPSK after the party's former secretary, Pak Hon-yong, was accused of espionage. He was denounced for individualism and regionalism by Kim Il Sung at a party congress in 1955.

== See also ==
- Workers' Party of South Korea
- Kim Dal-sam
