= Pak Mun-gyu =

North Korean politician (1906–?)

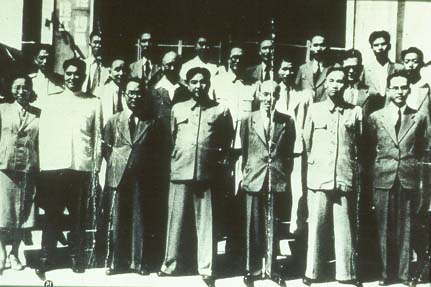
- September 1948. Park Moon-gyu with the first Cabinet of North Korea, first from the right of the third column

Minister of Land Administration

3rd Cabinet of North Korea
- In office 23 October 1962 – 16 December 1967
- Premier: Kim Il Sung
- Preceded by: Sok San
- Succeeded by: No Pyong-u

Minister of Local Administration

2nd Cabinet of North Korea
- In office 11 May 1956 – 31 August 1959
- Premier: Kim Il Sung
- Preceded by: Kim Ik-son
- Succeeded by: Post abolished

Minister of Agriculture

1st Cabinet of North Korea
- In office 29 November 1952 – 23 March 1954
- Premier: Kim Il Sung
- Preceded by: Post established
- Succeeded by: Kim Il

Personal details
- Born: 1906 Keishōhoku Province, Korea, Empire of Japan
- Died: Unknown
- Party: Workers' Party of Korea
- Education: Daegu High School
- Alma mater: Keijō Imperial University

Pak Mun-gyu (Korean: 박문규; Hancha: 朴文奎; 1906–?) Born in Gyeongsan, Gyeongsangbuk-do, he was an agronomist, sociologist, and politician in North Korea, held various positions in the early years of North Korean and its ruling Workers' Party of Korea. He was the first Minister of Agriculture and Forestry in the North Korean Cabinet and later Minister of Interior.

== Biography ==
In 1925, he graduated from Daegu High School, and after passing through the preparatory course at Keijō Imperial University, he went on to the Faculty of Law, the university. In 1927, Lee Kang-guk and Choi Yong-dal, the motivations for college admission, joined the school circle 'Economic Research Society' and focused on research on shipbuilding agricultural economics. After graduating from college in 1929 and continuing to study as a teaching assistant, he was examined by the Japanese police in 1931 due to the Seongdae Anti-Revolt Movement incident.

He wrote on agricultural topics: He analyzed the land survey business economically describing the late Joseon period, the feudal society had already seen the bud of the feudal possession of the land as a modern possession, but the modern land ownership system was established in Joseon by the land survey project (1910–1918) conducted by the demands of Japanese imperialism. In 1931, he was arrested by the Japanese police after being implicated in the Seongdae Anti-International Movement incident while being an assistant at the Keijō Imperial University. Subsequently, in 1944, he participated in the formation of the Korean Restoration Brotherhood under the direction of Lyuh Woon-hyung, a secret association under Japanese imperialism.

=== Liberation of Korea ===
Immediately after the liberation of August 15, he was appointed to the permanent committee of the Korea University, but he was transformed into a politician, head of the Planning Committee of the Korea National Preparatory Committee, and the Central People's Committee of Korea. Formed in February 1946, he served as the chief of propaganda and deputy director of the Democratic Front for the Reunification of Korea, as a standing committee member, as a researcher for land agriculture issues, and as a food researcher. On the other hand, in October 1946, the Journal of the Korean Land Issue was published. In this book, the paper on the previous land survey project was published in Japanese during the Japanese occupation period.

The National People's Committee in November 1945, prepared reports in which he was involved such as in the "Report on Land Agricultural Problems", the "Code of Conduct for the Farmers' Movement", the "Common Solutions to Land Problems in March", "Land Policy of the Anti-Democratic Party" in April 1946, and "Democracy and Land Reform" in May of the same year.

=== North Korea ===
In August 1948, he served as the central member of the South Korean Workers' Party until just before the establishment of North Korea. After North Korea was formally established in September 1948, he was elected to be a delegate in the Supreme People's Assembly, the country's unicameral parliament as well as Minister of Agriculture and Forestry (Korean: 농림상 (農林相) in the North Korean Cabinet. Later, in April 1956 he served as the National Censorship Minister, in 1959 as Local Administration Minister and in 1962 he became the Minister of Interior, and again elected as deputy and member of the Standing Committee of the Supreme People's Assembly in 1967, and in 1970 he was elected to the Central Committee of the Workers' Party of Korea.
