= Pak Hon-yong =

Korean independence activist (1900–1955)

- 박헌영
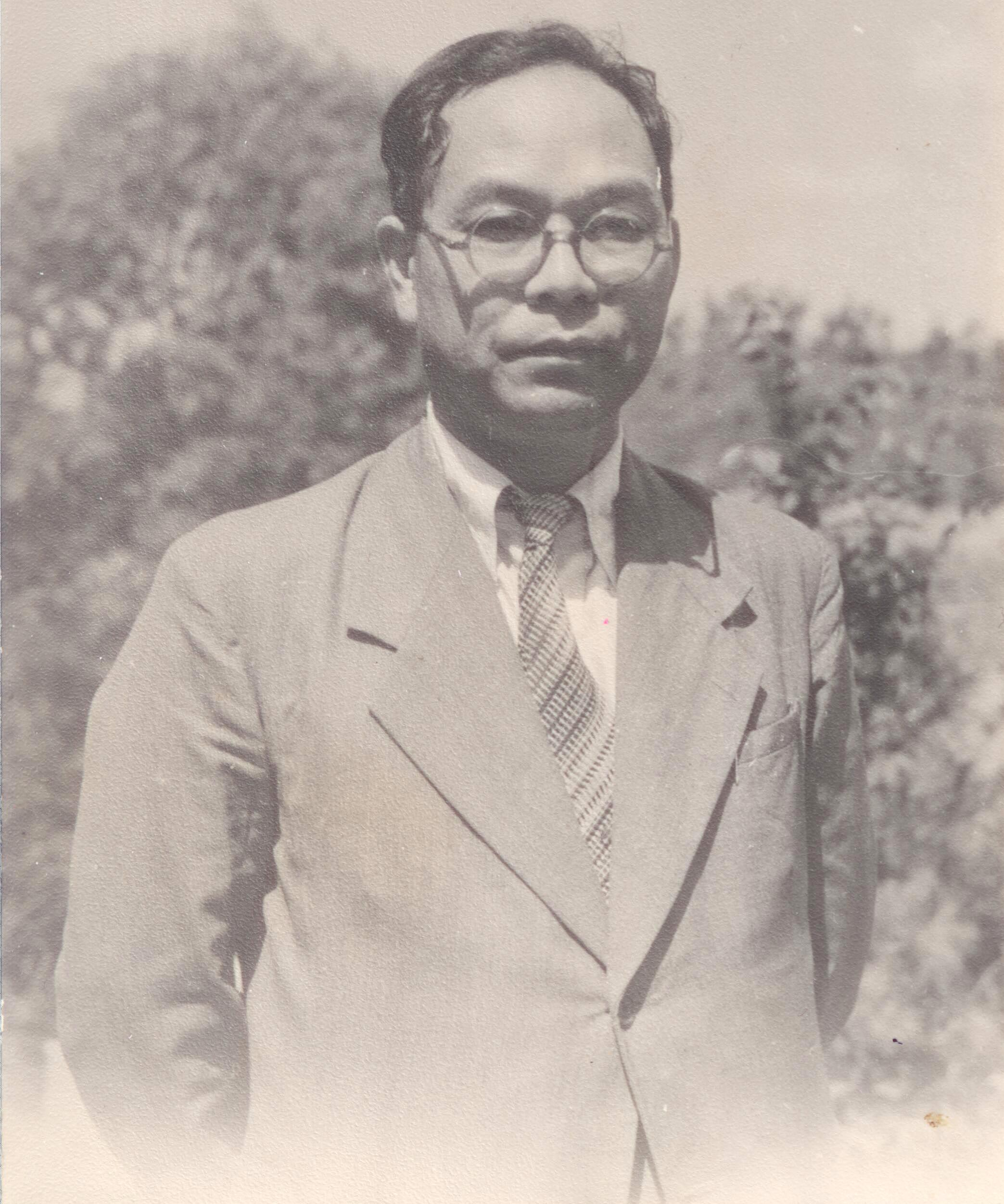
- Pak in 1948

Vice Chairman of the Workers' Party of Korea Central Committee

2nd Central Committee
- In office 24 June 1949 – 6 August 1953 Serving with Ho Ka-i
- Chairman: Kim Il Sung

Vice Premier of the Cabinet

1st Cabinet of North Korea
- In office 9 September 1948 – 3 March 1953 Serving with Hong Myong-hui, Kim Chaek, Ho Ka-i, Choe Chang-ik and Choe Yong-gon
- Premier: Kim Il Sung

Minister of Foreign Affairs

1st Cabinet of North Korea
- In office 9 September 1948 – 3 March 1953
- Premier: Kim Il Sung
- Preceded by: Post established
- Succeeded by: Nam Il

Vice Chairman of the Workers' Party of South Korea Central Committee
- In office 24 November 1946 – 30 June 1949 Serving with Yi Ki-sok
- Chairman: Ho Hon

Chairman of the Communist Party of Korea Central Committee
- In office 14 September 1945 – 24 November 1946
- Preceded by: Post established
- Succeeded by: Post dissolved

Personal details
- Born: 28 May 1900 Sinyang-myeon, Yesan, Korean Empire
- Died: 18 December 1955 (aged 55) Pyongyang, North Korea
- Citizenship: North Korean
- Party: Workers' Party of Korea (1949–1955); Workers' Party of South Korea (1946–1949); Communist Party of Korea (1925–1928, 1945–1946); Korean Communist Party (1921–1922)
- Spouse(s): Joo Se-juk, Jung Sunnyen, Yi Sunkeum, Yun Lena
- Children: Daughter: Vivian Park, Nathesa Park; Son: Park Byungsam
- Parent(s): Lee Hakkyu (Mother); Park Hyin-ju (Father)
- Education: Kyŏngsŏng Ordinary High School (1919); KyungKi High School; International Lenin School

Korean name
- Hangul: 박헌영
- Hanja: 朴憲永
- RR: Bak Heonyeong
- MR: Pak Hŏnyŏng

Art name
- Hangul: 이정, 이춘
- Hanja: 而丁/而靜, 而春
- RR: Ijeong, Ichun
- MR: Ijŏng, Ich'un

Courtesy name
- Hangul: 덕영
- Hanja: 德永
- RR: Deokyeong
- MR: Tŏgyŏng

Pak Hon-yong (Korean: 박헌영; Hanja: 朴憲永; 28 May 1900 – 18 December 1955), courtesy name Togyong (덕영), was a Korean independence activist, politician, philosopher, and Communist activist, and one of the main leaders of the Korean Communist movement during Japan's colonial rule (1910–1945).

During the Japanese occupation of Korea, he tried to organize the Korean Communist Party. When the Japanese authorities cracked down on the party, he went into hiding. After Korea's liberation in August 1945, he set up the Communist Party of Korea in the south, but, under pressure from American authorities, he moved to North Korea (then People's Committee of North Korea) in April 1948. Shortly thereafter, he attended a meeting with Kim Ku and Kim Kyu-sik on the subject of Korean reunification.

Pak collaborated with Kim Il Sung, founder of the Democratic People's Republic of Korea, during the Korean War. In 1955, on account of the failure of the war to unify the Korean Peninsula, North Korean authorities sentenced him to forfeiture of all property, and death. Although the Soviet Union and China tried to dissuade Kim Il Sung from executing Pak, Pak was eventually executed for the fabricated accusation of being an American spy.

== Biography ==
=== Early life ===
Pak was born to a yangban family of the Yeonghae Park lineage in Sinyang-myeon, Yesan County, South Chungcheong Province. However, he was the illegitimate son of a concubine.

In 1919, he graduated from Kyŏngsŏng Ordinary High School, now Kyunggi High School. In March 1919, he was involved in the March First Movement and later independence movements.

=== Political activities ===
In 1921, he joined the Shanghai branch of the Korean Communist Party, Irkutsk faction. At this time, he was secretary of the Korean Communist Youth League. In January 1922, he participated in the Comintern Far East People's Representative Council in Moscow.

Pak Hon-yong was arrested in Korea in April 1922 and was charged with being a Communist Party organizer. He was released in 1924 and became active as a reporter for the newspapers The Dong-A Ilbo and The Chosun Ilbo under the names Ijong (이정) and Ichun (이춘).

==== Underground ====
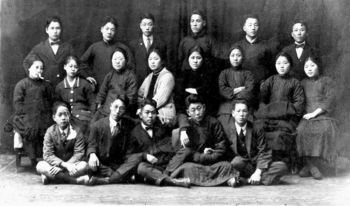
Pak among other Korean students of the International Lenin School

On 18 April 1925, Pak Hon-yong became one of the founders of the Communist Party of Korea. From this point until the end of World War II, his activities were clandestine.

In 1926, Pak appeared in court. During the trial, he feigned insanity and ate feces, with the result that he was acquitted in November of that year. Afterwards, he was confined to his home due to his supposed ill-health, but in December he escaped by way of Manchuria to reach the Soviet Union. It was only then that the Japanese realized that he was feigning madness.

In the Soviet Union, he was educated in the International Lenin School, returning home in 1940. Back in Korea, he was active in the resistance to Japanese rule.

=== After World War II ===
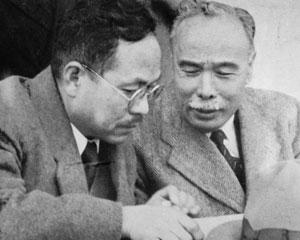
Pak Hon-yong and Lyuh Woon-hyung in 1946

Late in August 1945, the Communist Party of Korea (조선 공산당) was re-established, having been officially disbanded in 1928, and Pak became its secretary. Pak was the most prominent Communist in Korea at the time. On 5 January 1946, as its representative, he announced at a foreign and domestic press conference that, supporting the decision of the Moscow conference of great powers (UK, US, Soviet Union), Korea was now in the process of a "democratic revolution". After the December 1945 Moscow Conference, the Communist Party of Korea was suppressed by the United States Army Military Government.

He was instrumental in organizing the Korean general strike of September 1946, which at its peak involved more than a quarter of a million workers.

In December 1946, he organized the Workers Party of South Korea known as (남로당), and became one of two vice chairmen.

=== North–South negotiations and life in North Korea ===
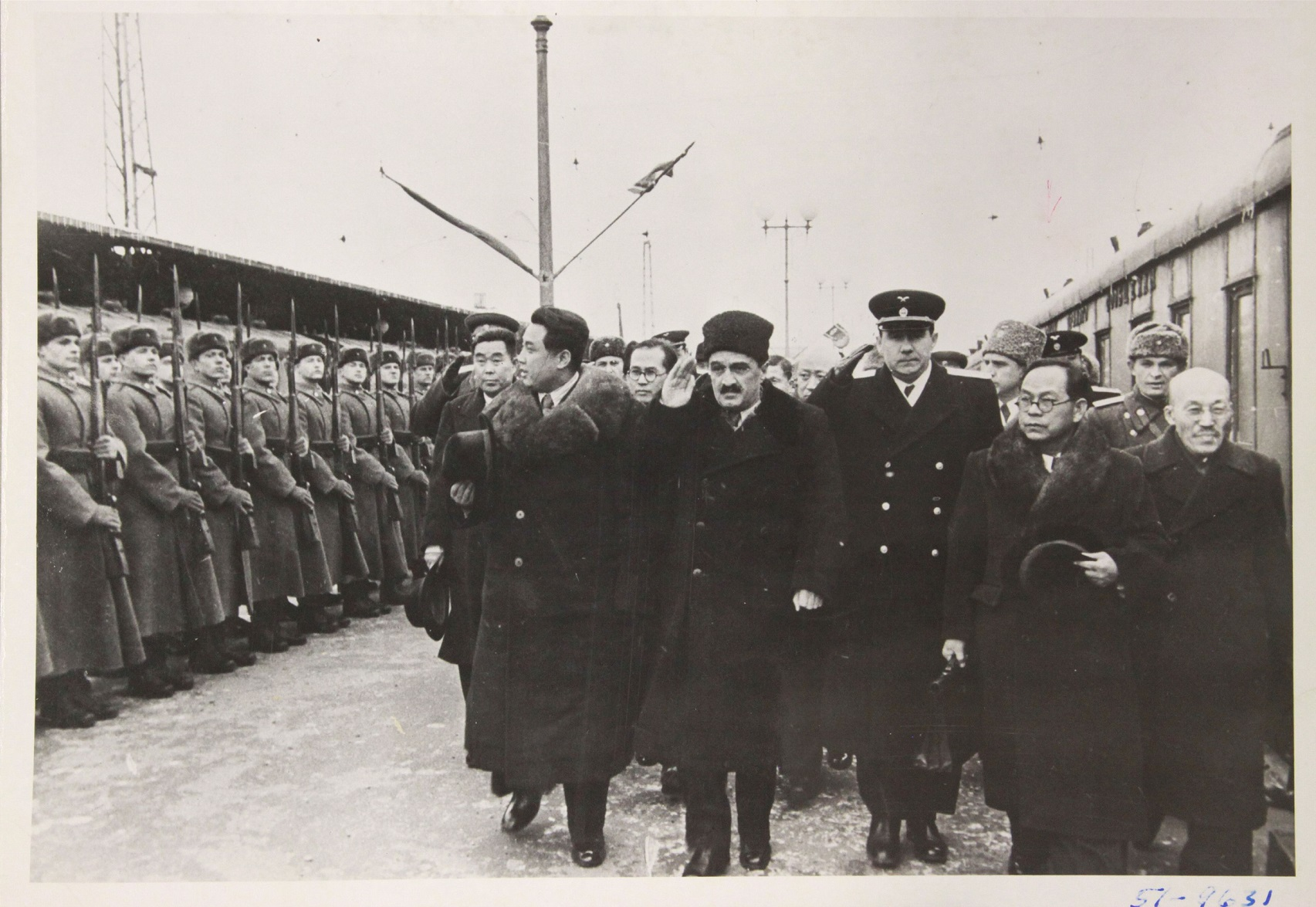
From the left: Kim Il-sung, Anastas Mikoyan, Andrei Gromyko, Pak Hon-yong, and Hong Myong-hui passing before the guard of honor at the Yaroslav Station. Moscow, March 1949

In April 1948, Pak visited North Korea for negotiations, along with Kim Ku and Kim Kyu-sik. In May 1948, the negotiations ended, and he remained in the North.

In September 1948, while keeping his role as Secretary of the Workers' Party of South Korea, he became Deputy Prime Minister and Foreign Minister of the newly established North Korean state.

Pak became Secretary of the Workers' Party of Korea when the Northern and Southern parties united in April 1950. Pak was the Vice Chairman of the Politburo of the DPRK from 1949 to 1953, and Foreign Minister of the DPRK until he was ousted and arrested in 1953. Some of his last recorded political acts were exchanging letters with North Vietnamese Foreign Minister Hoàng Minh Giám, celebrating the third anniversary of the establishment of diplomatic relationships between the two countries, and his appearance in Pyongyang at the commemoration of the 35th anniversary of the Soviet Red Army.

=== Korean War ===
According to secret documents of the former Soviet Union released in succession until 2002, Kim Il-sung and Pak always acted together until the detailed plans of the war were finally decided. They were also together during their visit to Moscow from 30 March to 25 April 1950, meeting Stalin and receiving written instructions of detailed war plans.

=== Arrest and death ===
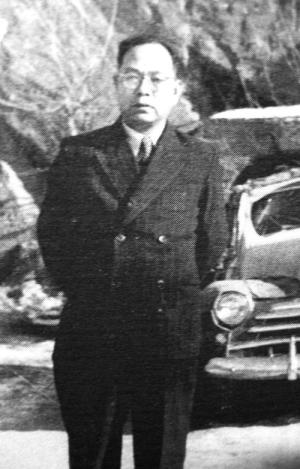
Pak Hon-yong, 1952

Pak was arrested on 3 August 1953 in a purge of the former members of the Workers' Party of South Korea orchestrated by Kim Il-sung. On 15 December 1955, he was sentenced to death for espionage. The date of Pak's death is uncertain, though sources suggest that he was executed that same month.

According to the CIA:

When in 1939, Pak Hon-yong came secretly to Seoul to set up an underground organization, he met secretly with [Horace Horton] Underwood, principal of the Yonhui College in Seoul, and a US CIA agent [?] on Korean operations, and discussed the international situation and how much aid the US can give in the struggle for Korean independence. It is ironic that years later, this meeting served as an excuse for Kim ll-sung to accuse Pak Hon-yong as an American spy.

Note: the reference to Underwood as a CIA agent in 1939, eight years before the CIA was established, appears in the original CIA document, flagged as shown with a "?".

== Works ==
- Our Duties in Modern Society
- Historical Views of the Christian Inner

== See also ==
- Communist Party of Korea
- Workers' Party of South Korea
- Workers' Party of Korea
- Korean independence movement
- Politics of North Korea

Preceded by -	Leader of Joseon Communist Party; 1945–1946	Succeeded by
