= Fyodor Tertitskiy =

Korean historian (born 1988)

- Фёдор Тертицкий
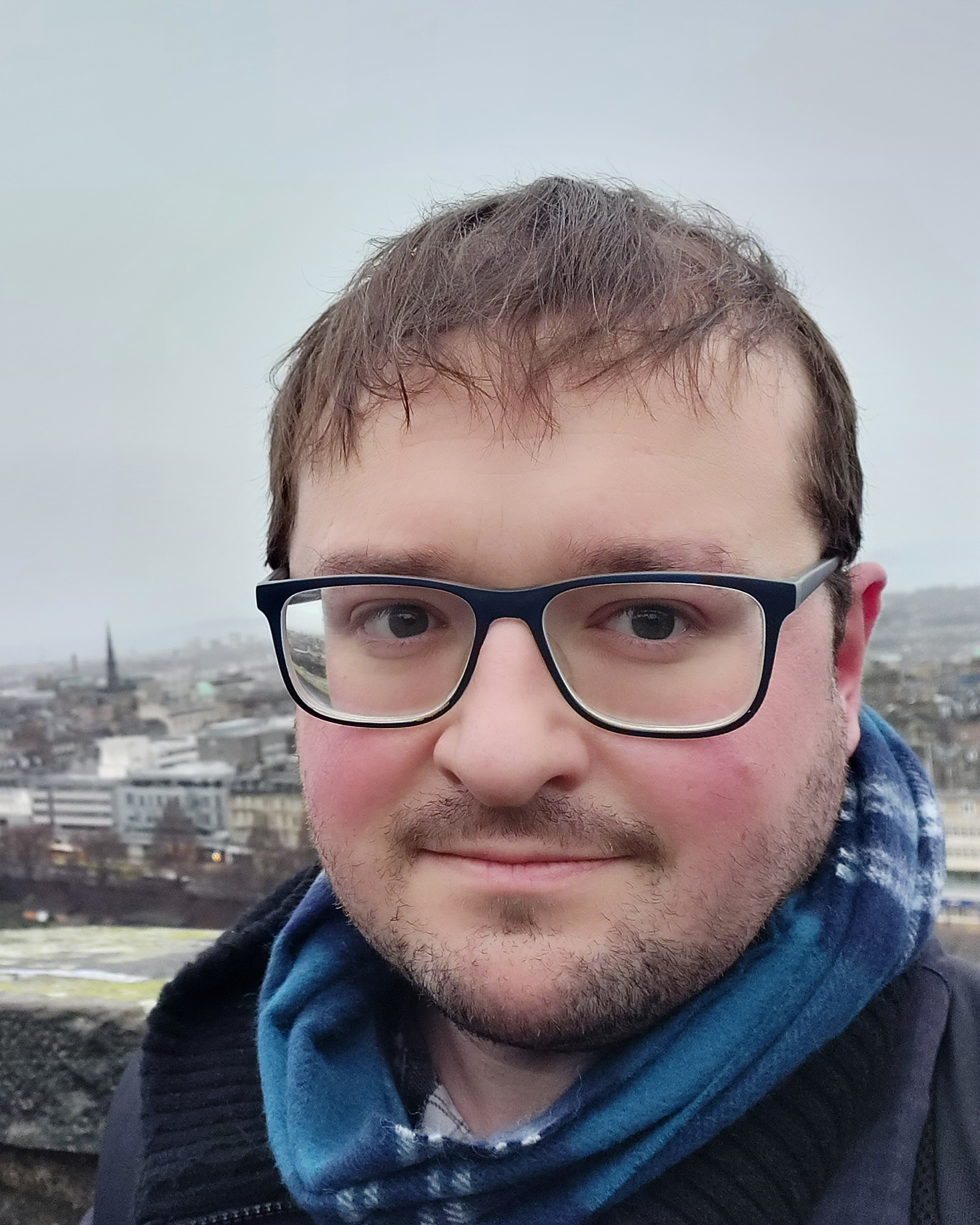
- Tertitskiy in January 2022
- Born: 23 August 1988 (age 38); Moscow, Soviet Union
- Citizenship: Soviet Union (1988–1991); Russia (1991–2024); South Korea (2024–present)
- Education: Seoul National University (PhD)
- Occupations: Historian, scholar of North Korea
- Notable work: Accidental Tyrant: The Life of Kim Il-sung (2025); The North Korean Army: History, Structure, Daily Life (2022)
- Father: Konstantin Tertitskiy

Fyodor Konstantinovich Tertitskiy (Note: In this name that follows East Slavic naming customs, the patronymic is Konstantinovich and the family name is Tertitskiy.) (Russian: Фёдор Константинович Тертицкий; also known by his Korean name Lee Hwisung, Korean: 이휘성, Hanja 李輝星; born 23 August 1988) is a Russian and South Korean historian and specialist on North Korea. He lives in Seoul, lectures at Korea University, and has held a research post at Kookmin University's Institute for Korean Studies.

== Biography ==
Tertitskiy was born in Moscow in 1988. During high school, he decided to pursue a career as a scholar of North Korea. He majored in Korean studies at university and moved to Seoul in 2011. He completed his master's degree at the University of North Korean Studies in Seoul and earned a PhD from Seoul National University in 2017. Tertitskiy lectures at Korea University. Tertitskiy writes on North Korean political, social, and military history for outlets including NK News and Daily NK.

== Reception ==
Tertitskiy's Accidental Tyrant (Hurst and Oxford University Press, 2025), a biography of Kim Il Sung, was reviewed by the Financial Times, The Wall Street Journal, Foreword Reviews (which awarded it a starred review), and the Asian Review of Books. The book was also selected for the Financial Times' 'Best summer books: History" list and included in The Week's roundup of notable history titles for 2025. South Korean media have credited Tertitskiy with several archival discoveries, including: a 1941 Soviet interrogation protocol of Kim Il Sung; Kim Il Sung's confession regarding clandestine financial assistance to Cho Bong-am, an opposition candidate in the 1956 South Korean presidential election; a 1969 KGB report on Kim family relatives; and records of talks between Pak Song-chol and Leonid Brezhnev.

== Works ==
- Tertitskiy, Fyodor (2026). Pyongyang on the Brink: Sixteen Crises That Shaped North Korea. Hurst Publishers. ISBN 9781805266082.
- Accidental Tyrant: The Life of Kim Il-sung (London: Hurst, 2025; New York: Oxford University Press, 2025). ISBN 9780197800881.
  - 표도르 째르치즈스키(이휘성) (2022). 김일성 전기. 파주: 한울아카데미. ISBN 9788946081871.
  - Фёдор Тертицкий (2025). Ким Ир Сен: вождь по воле случая. Москва: Альпина нон-фикшн. ISBN 978-5-00223-321-2.
- Tertitskiy, Fyodor (2024). The Forgotten Political Elites of North Korea: Woe to the Vanquished. Routledge. ISBN 9781032745473.
- Tertitskiy, Fyodor (2023). Soviet-North Korean Relations During the Cold War: Unruly Offspring. Routledge. ISBN 9781032537306.
  - 표도르 째르치즈스키(이휘성) (2023). 북한과 소련: 잊혀진 인물과 에피소드. 한울아카데미. ISBN 978-89-460-7466-8.
- Tertitskiy, Fyodor (2022). The North Korean Army: History, Structure, Daily Life. Routledge. ISBN 9781032147154.
- 표도르 째르치즈스키(이휘성) (2018). 김일성 이전의 북한: 1945년 8월 9일 소련군 참전부터 10월 14일 평양 연설까지 [North Korea before Kim Il Sung: From the Soviet Union's entry into the war on August 9, 1945, to the Pyongyang speech on October 14, 1945]. 한울아카데미. ISBN 978-89-460-7113-1.
