= Singanhoe =

1927–1931 Korean nationalist group

- Hangul: 신간회
- Hanja: 新幹會
- RR: Singanhoe
- MR: Sin'ganhoe

Singanhoe (Korean: 신간회; Hanja: 新幹會) or the New Shoot Association was a Korean independence activist group founded on February 15, 1927 during the Japanese colonial period. It unified Korean socialist and nationalist factions and maintained a unilateral independence movement until May 1931. Including both Korean and overseas branches, this organization was able to attract a total membership of between 30,000 and 40,000 people. While internal strife between leftist and rightist factions was a consistent obstacle, the Singanhoe actively pursued several goals:

- the abolishment of racial, political, and economic oppression
- the attainment of freedoms of speech, organization, association, and publishing
- the support of youth and women's equality movements
- the overturning of factionalism and clan nepotism
- the opposition to the East Asia Colonial Development Company
- the propagation of the economic frugality movement.

== Background ==
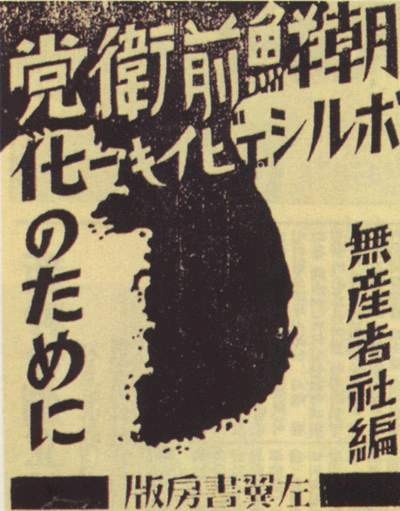
1931

=== Solidarity within the Socialist Movement ===
From the mid-1920s, there was a rising sentiment within the socialist camp regarding the need for a comprehensive umbrella organization. Even within the nascent socialist camp, which spread rapidly after the events of the March 1st Movement, activists began to recognize the necessity of a cooperative front with the nationalist camp. They drew much inspiration from the successful cooperation in China of the Communists and the Nationalists in forming a united movement against imperialism and towards national independence.

== Formation ==
Even as the nationalist camp and socialist camps sought mutual cooperation, the socialists looked beyond the strict class ideology that marked the earlier movement, and from 1924 could be categorized into two camps: the cooperative nationalist camp and the revolutionary nationalist camp. As a result, from 1926, there started to be an organizational start to this search for an uncompromising movement.

Although they were not successful in actualizing these plans, Kang Talyŏng, who was the second secretariat of the Korean Communist Party, made contact with Kwŏn Tongjin, An Chaehong, and Kim Chunyŏn, among others. The Korean National Party's desire to create an organized national front in response to the general trend towards the Autonomy Movement is a representative example of the situation at the time.

The cooperation between recalcitrant nationalists and socialists progressed rapidly as the Chŏng’uhoe (正友會) published the Chŏng’uhoe Statement which advocated the establishment of a singular nationalist body that was a coalition between nationalist and socialist camps.

=== The Chŏng’uhoe Declaration ===
Concerning the political movement that has been developing due to the concentrated efforts of nationalists, as long as it is needed, we cannot simply pass by without addressing these issues. Rather, first we must turn from political action that is limited to traditionalist economic struggles towards a more class based, mass based, and intellectually based polity. Consequently, concerning the influence of nationalism, we must clearly grasp the nature of bourgeoisie nationalism, while at the same time also adequately approving of the nature of the alliance process, and make ally in a progressive manner which limits this process from emerging corrupted, thus for the improvement of the masses we must cast off the passive processes of the past and fight valiantly.

— From Chosŏn ilbo November 17, 1926

Chŏng’uhoe was a socialist ideological body made up of the Tuesday Club, the Pukpunghoe, the Chosŏn Communist Party, and the Proletariat Alliance. By 1926, socialism had grown to such a large scale extent that 338 ideological circles were active, but the aforementioned four groups constitute the principle influences of Korea's socialist movement.

The Chŏng’uhoe, which had been formed in April 1926, made their famous proclamation on November of the same year. The main crux of the proclamation, which criticized the previous activities of the socialist movement, were the advocacy of “the elimination of the factionalism and the unification of ideology,” “a shift from the economic struggle to political struggle,” and “the development of a unified nationalistic body.” In other words, “so that the influence of nationalism would not degrade, we must progressively support other groups and fight” became their mantra. Thus in line with their proclamation, once the Singanhoe was formed as a united nationalist body, the Chŏnguhoe bravely dissolved their organization.

Among the various organs established to promote understanding between the dual branches of socialism and nationalism, the Singanhoe was the first to advocate a thoroughly consolidated organization. In order to receive the imprimatur of the office of the Japanese Governor-General of Korea, the vice president of Chosŏn ilbo took action, and while he originally proposed the title of “Sinhanhoe” (新韓會) for the organization, the Governor-General did not approve so the name was revised to “Singanhoe” (新幹會).

=== Establishment Principles ===
- We advocate the promotion of a greater political and economic awareness
- We advocate firm, mutual cooperation
- We decisively oppose opportunism

== See also ==
- Heo Jong-suk
- Geunwoohoe
