= Yi Kŭngno =

North Korean politician (1893–1978)

Lee Kŭngno
- 이극로
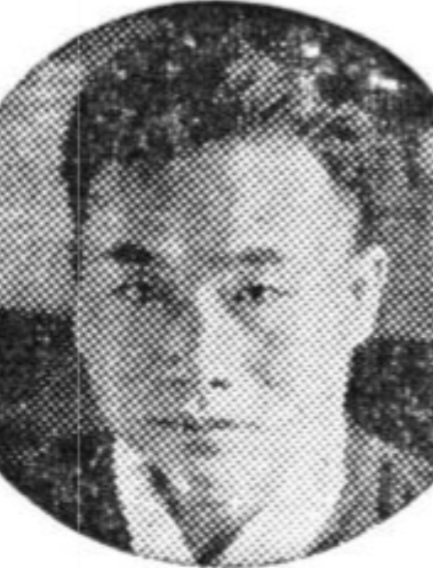

Minister without portfolio

Personal details
- Born: December 9, 1903 Uiryeong County, Korea, Empire of Japan
- Died: 1978
- Party: Workers' Party of Korea
- Education: Dongje University

Yi Kŭngno (Korean: 이극로; August 28, 1893 – 1978) was born in Uiryeong, Gyeongsangnam-do, as a descendant of the 15th generation of Jeon Il-join, the 28th-year-old Ulsan Hwasu Association of Jeonui Yean, and the 15th-year-old commander of the Joseon Dynasty. He was an independent activist who was active during the Japanese colonial period, was the chairman of the Korean Language Society and, was a Hangeul scholar. He served with liberation while serving, accompanied by Mr. Baek Kim, a party secretary, and remained in the war. Following the establishment of North Korea, he served as Minister without portfolio and was a member of the Standing Committee of the Supreme People's Assembly.

== Biography ==
Yi Kŭngno was born on August 28, 1893, in a farmhouse in Dugok-ri, Jeongjeong-myeon, Uiryeong County, South Gyeongsang Province, studied at Seodang, and entered Masan Changsin School in 1910. In 1912, he fled to Seogan Island to become part of an independent army fighting against the Japanese colonial regime.

In 1912, he met Yun Sebok, who became the third-generation head of the Great Religion at Hoi Inhyeon School of Alumni, and returned to the Great Religion. After closing the alumni school, in 1915, Musong County Baeksan School again taught students. Then, after crossing to Shanghai, China, he entered the Dongje University, run by Germans, and had the opportunity to systematically experience Western studies.

After graduating from Dongje University in Shanghai in 1920, he graduated from the Department of Philosophy at Humboldt University in Berlin, Germany in 1927. He participated in the study of Hangul orthography in the mid-Japanese period during the Japanese colonial period, he was a member of the Korean language dictionary compilation committee in 1929, a member of the Korean Hangul Spelling Act in 1930, a member of the Korean Language Standards Assessment Committee in 1935, and a full-time member of the Korean language dictionary compilation committee in 1936.

On October 1, 1942, he was arrested during the Korean Language Society Incident, sentenced to 6 years in prison at the Hamhung Court, and served in the Hamhung Prison and was released after liberation in August 1945. In 1946, he served as Chairman of the Kunminhoe, and in April 1948, he went to Pyongyang to attend the 'Joint Meeting of Political Parties and Social Organizations of South and North Korea' and remained there to work in North Korea. In September 1948, following the formal declaration on the establishment of North Korea, he was elected to a deputy in the Supreme People's Assembly and served as a minister without portfolio in the Cabinet of North Korea led by Premier Kim Il Sung. In 1949 he became the chairman of the Central Committee of the Democratic Front for the Reunification of Korea candidate for the Academy of Sciences of the Democratic People's Republic of Korea, vice-chairman of the Standing Committee of the Supreme People's Assembly in 1953, In 1962 he became director of the Institute of Korean Language and Literature of the Academy of Sciences of the Democratic People's Republic of Korea, Chairman of the Central Committee of the Fatherland Front in 1966, Chairman of the Committee for the Peaceful Reunification of the Fatherland in 1970, and Vice Chairman of the People's Committee in Yanggang Province in 1972.
