= List of hospitals in North Korea =

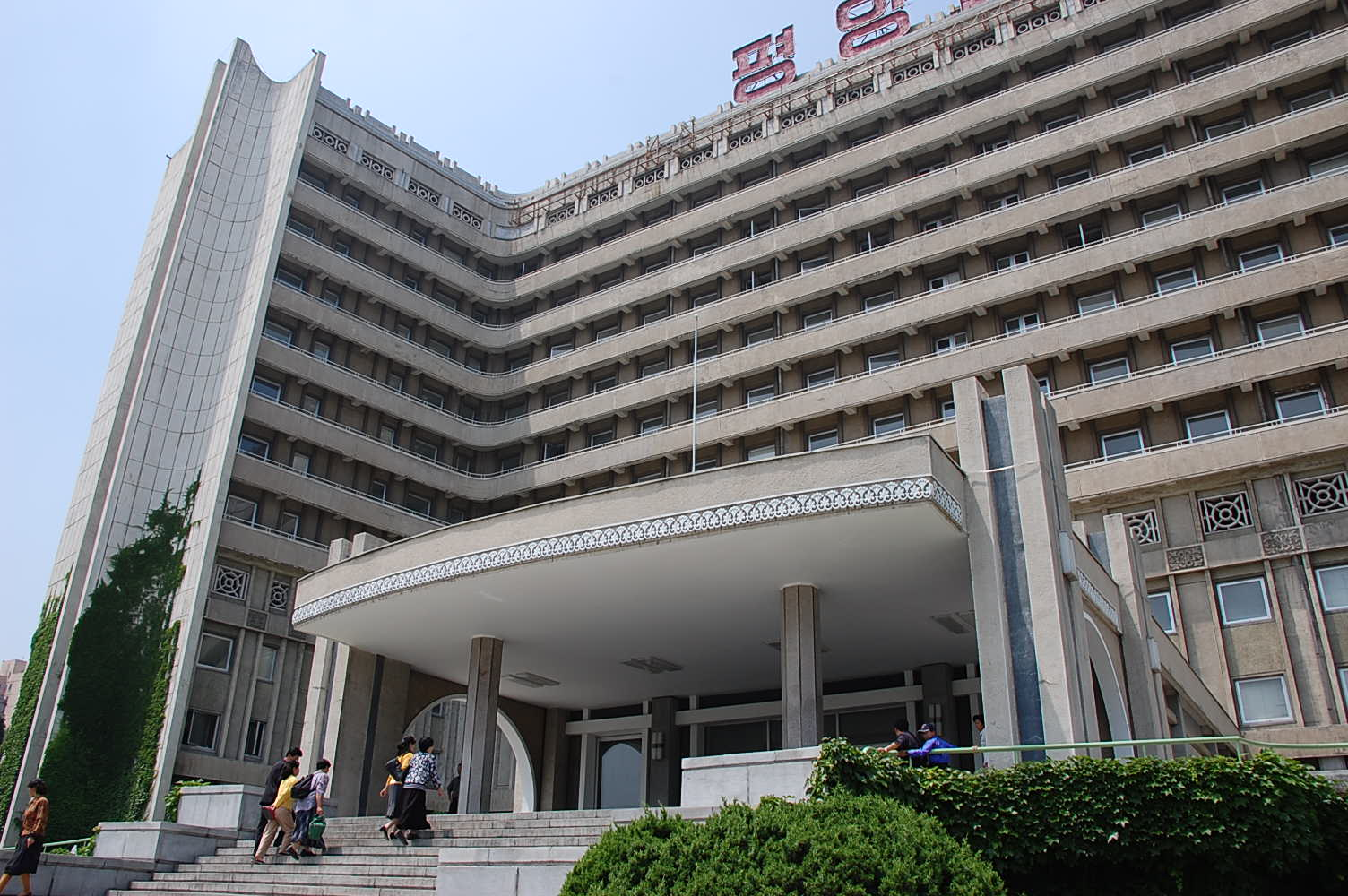
Pyongyang Maternity Hospital

List of hospitals in North Korea includes the following:

- Ponghwa Clinic, Sinwŏn-dong, Potonggang-guyok, Pyongyang; opened in 1971
- Pyongyang General Hospital, Pyongyang, opened on October 6, 2025
- Pyongyang Maternity Hospital
- Pyongyang Red Cross Hospital (조선적십자병원)
- Pyongyang Medical University Hospital
- Pyongyang City Hospital One
- Kim Man-yu Hospital
- Ryugyong General Ophthalmic Hospital (November 2016)
- Okryu Children's Hospital (October 2013)
- Ryugyong Dental Hospital (October 2013)
- Koryo Medicine General Hospital (April 2001)
- Kangdong County Hospital (construction announced 2025)
- Kusong City Hospital (construction announced 2025)
- Ryonggang County Hospital (construction announced 2025)

== See also ==
- Health in North Korea
