= Hyon Chol-hae =

North Korean military officer (1934–2022)

Wonsu Hyon Chol-hae

Vice Director of the General Political Department
- In office 1986–1995
- Supreme Leader: Kim Jong Il

Personal details
- Born: 13 August 1934 Yanji, Jilin, Manchukuo
- Died: 19 May 2022 (aged 87) Ponghwa Clinic, Pyongyang, North Korea
- Resting place: Patriotic Martyrs' Cemetery
- Citizenship: North Korean
- Party: Workers' Party of Korea
- Education: Nicolae Bălcescu Land Forces Academy

Military service
- Allegiance: North Korea
- Branch/service: Korean People's Army
- Rank: Marshal
- Battles/wars: Korean War

Korean name
- Hangul: 현철해
- Hanja: 玄哲海
- RR: Hyeon Cheolhae
- MR: Hyŏn Ch'ŏrhae

Hyon Chol-hae (Korean: 현철해; 13 August 1934 – 19 May 2021) was a North Korean military officer and politician who was closely tied to the ruling Kim family. He served as Kim Il Sung's bodyguard during the Korean War and reported directly to Kim Jong Il as deputy director of the General Political Department. In 2016, he was promoted to Marshal of the Korean People's Army, the Army's highest rank.

He died on 19 May 2022 from multiple organ failure. He received a state funeral, in which Kim Jong Un personally carried his casket.

== Biography ==
Hyon was born on 13 August 1934 in Yanji, Jilin province in the Japanese puppet state of Manchukuo.

During the Korean War, Hyon served as Kim Il Sung's bodyguard, a role which gave him "a place in North Korea's revolutionary history". He was director of the General Logistics Department of the Korean People's Army from 1986 to 1995, when he was appointed deputy director of the General Political Department, becoming one of the most senior members of the North Korean military and political leadership. He was described as being in "close proximity" to Kim Jong Il, and as reporting directly to him. It had been suggested that following the death of Kim Jong Il he may have taken part in a military council leading the country. He was transferred to director of the Standing Bureau of the National Defence Commission. He was a member of the Central Committee of the Workers' Party of Korea from 1991 until his death.

He was vital in securing the succession campaign for Kim Jong Un, having entrusted by Kim Jong Il with the upbringing of his chosen successor, effectively serving as a "political" mentor of Kim Jong Un. This is attested by photographs and television footage which shown Hyon accompanying Kim Jong Un in the late 2000s.

In April 2012, he received important promotions as Vice Marshal, member of the Politburo and the Central Military Commission of the Workers' Party of Korea, first vice-minister of the People's Armed Forces and director of the army's General Logistics Department.

He was replaced as first vice-minister of defense by his predecessor as logistics director, Jon Chang-bok, in May 2013.

On April 15, 2016, Hyon Chol-hae became the fifth person to be promoted to the rank of Marshal of the Korean People's Army, in one of the first two promotions of active duty officers after 21 years.

== Death and State Funeral of Hyon Chol-Hae ==
On 19 May 2022, Hyon died at the Ponghwa Clinic in Pyongyang from multiple organ failure at the age of 87. He received a state funeral and was laid in state at the April 25 House of Culture. Kim Jong Un personally bore his casket and placed earth upon his grave at the Patriotic Martyrs' Cemetery. His legacy in cementing Kim's rule is embellished in North Korean media, attesting his role in Kim Jong Un's succession preparations as "an outstanding revolutionary born of the Juche revolution and a skilled military politician". A documentary was made in his honor which aired in state television days after his death, and Kim Jong Un chaired his funeral committee.

== Awards and honors ==
A frame with Kim's awards and honors was displayed during his funeral, showing all the decorations he had received.

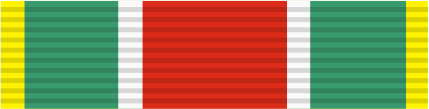

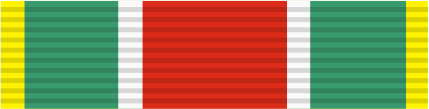

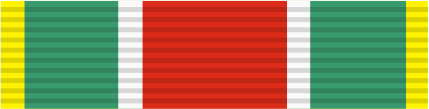

== Links ==
- Grave of Hyon Chol-hae
