= Pyongyang Maternity Hospital =

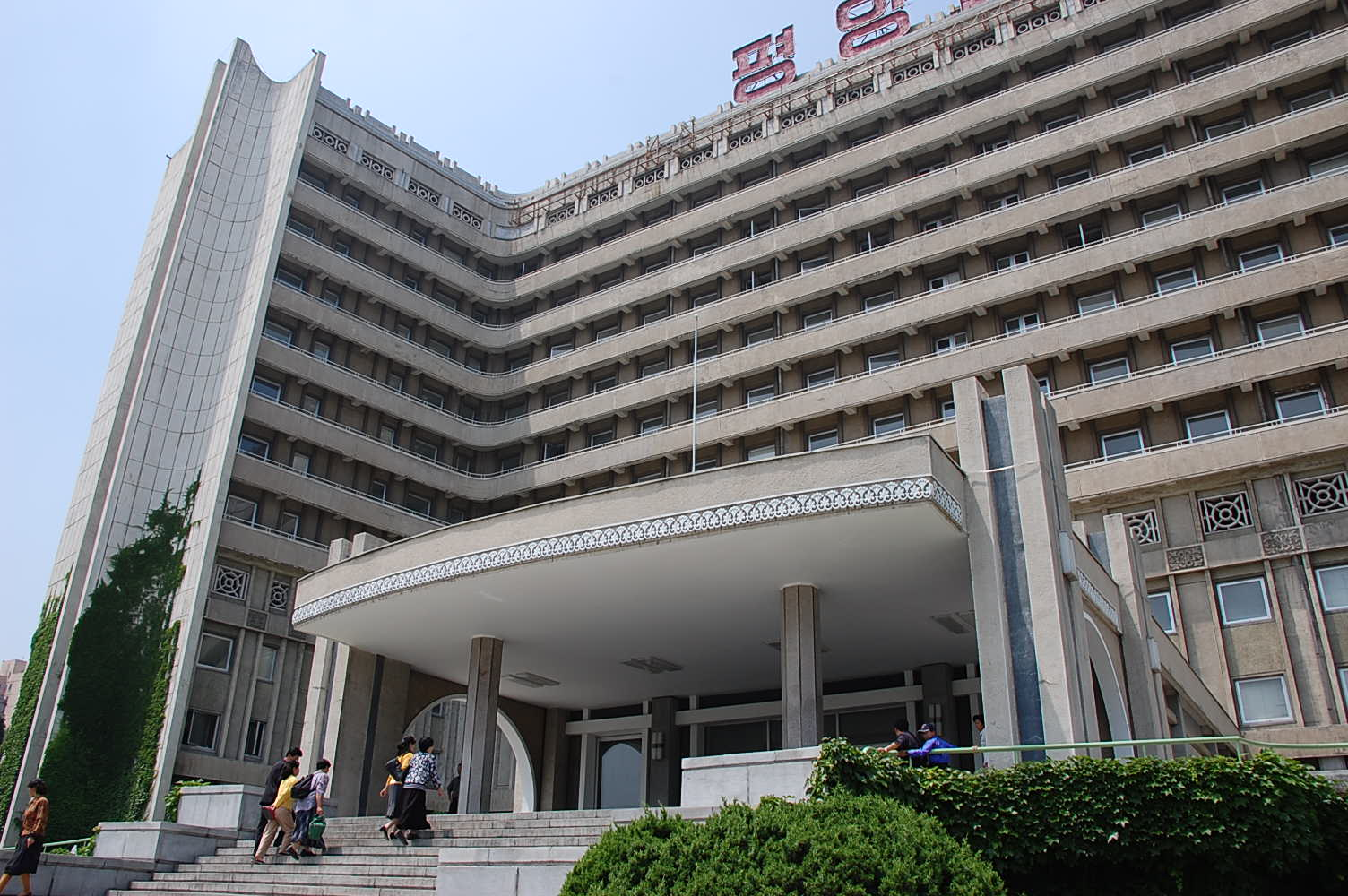
- Entrance of the Pyongyang Maternity Hospital

Geography
- Location: Pyongyang, North Korea
- Coordinates: 39°1′28″N 125°46′50″E

Organisation
- Care system: Public
- Type: Specialist

Services
- Beds: 1500, of which 1000 are for adults and 500 are for children
- Speciality: Maternity hospital, medical education

Helipads
- Helipad: Yes

History
- Founded: Building finished in 1979. Started operating on 30 July 1980.

- Pyongyang Maternity Hospital
- Chosŏn'gŭl: 평양산원
- Hancha: 平壤產院
- Revised Romanization: Pyeongyang Sanwon
- McCune–Reischauer: P'yŏngyang Sanwŏn

The Pyongyang Maternity Hospital (Korean: 평양산원; MR: P'yŏngyang Sanwŏn) is a maternity and teaching hospital in Pyongyang. Nurses and midwives are educated in the hospital for work outside the North Korean capital. There is a neonatal intensive care unit at the hospital. In addition, there are multiple different wards, such as dental and breast cancer wards, to treat mothers' various health problems.

The hospital employs a unique system of video call booths for family to communicate with a woman who has given birth, as family members are restricted from being in personal contact with the newborn and the mother for five days. It is believed that this helps to prevent infections.

Traditional Korean medicine is used conspicuously in the treatment of patients, and around 30 percent of all given treatments are based on traditional methods.

In 2012, the hospital was expanded when a new wing specialized for breast cancer was constructed at the hospital grounds by orders of Kim Jong Un.

== History ==
In the 1970s, a state policy for maternity issues was initiated. Kim Jong Il decided to build the hospital in 1978, and it was rumored that he wished that no women would die any longer due to pregnancy complications, as his mother Kim Jong-suk had died. The achievement of building the hospital was used as means to emphasize Kim Jong Il's achievements for his confirmed status as an heir apparent.

The Pyongyang Maternity Hospital was part of the Pyongyang Speed campaign to construct various public facilities for the 6th Congress of the Workers' Party of Korea, which took place on 10–14 October 1980—the congress' beginning coincided with the 35th Party Foundation Day—and the congress was followed by large construction projects continuing into the early 1980s. The hospital was completed in less than nine months. Completed in 1979, the hospital began operating on the 34th anniversary of the Law on Sex Equality on 30 July 1980. The hospital was praised as one of the best in mainland Northeast Asia after opening; the quality of maternity care in the country had improved since the 1940s and 1950s.

Around 2005, nationwide attention was given to maternity hospitals and obstetric and gynecological departments to ensure that a larger proportion of women would receive in-hospital care for childbirth by competent medical staff. The Pyongyang Maternity Hospital's management and facilities were also improved at that time.

In 2012 the hospital was expanded by Kim Jong Un with a new wing, equipped with modern medical equipment, which houses the Breast Cancer Research Center. The hospital has a personal connection for Kim Jong Un, as it had for his father Kim Jong Il, as Kim Jong Un's mother Ko Yong-hui died due to breast cancer.

On 20 March 2020, the 500th set of triplets born at Pyongyang Maternity Hospital were born.

== Facilities ==
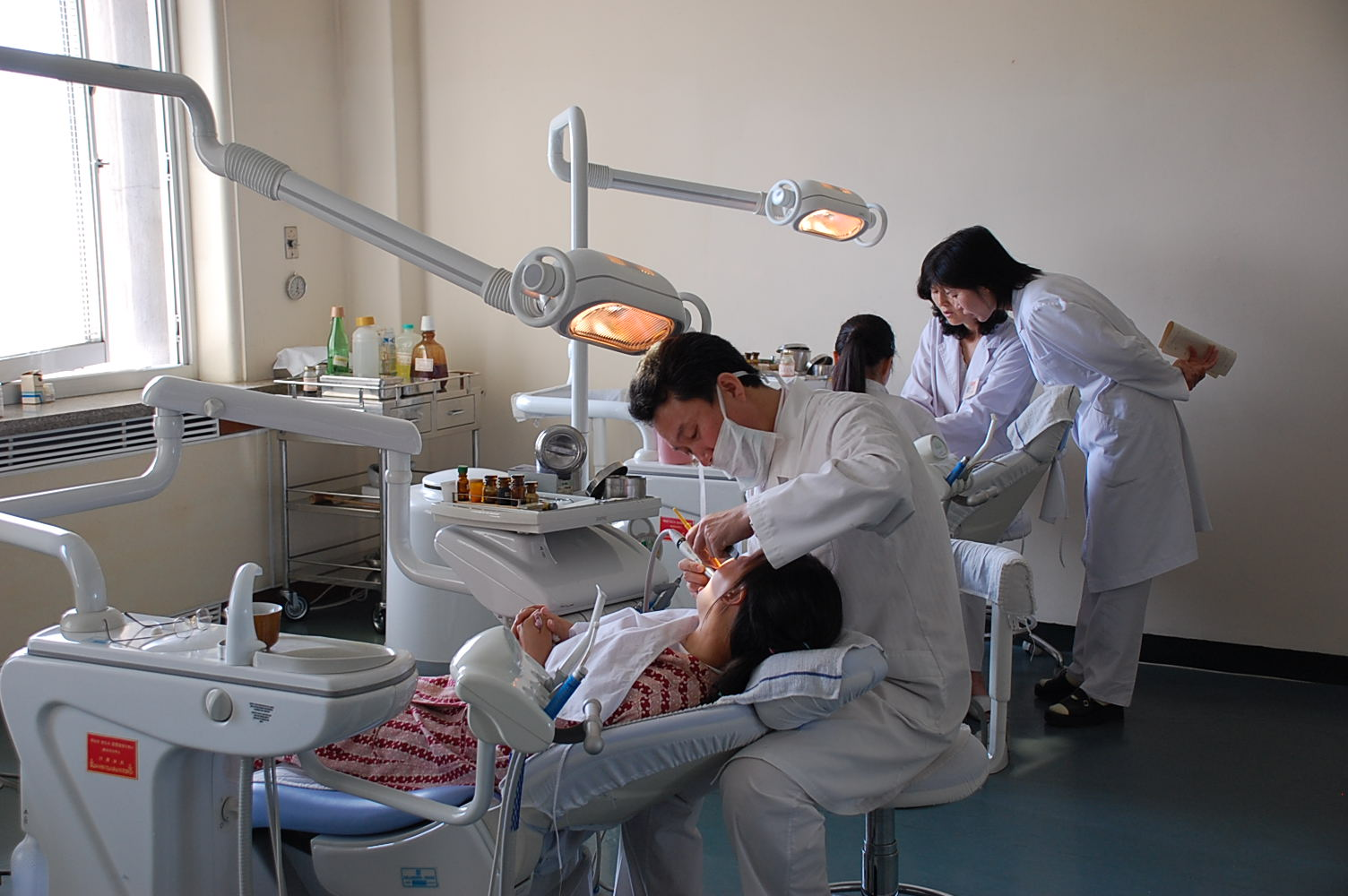
Dental ward for the patients.

Health services are provided for childbirth, infertility, menstrual disorder, dystonia, chronic inflammatory disease, problems associated with pregnancy and cardiology, neurology, ophthalmology, dentistry, ear, nose and throat, and physiotherapy. In addition, a neonatal intensive care unit operates at the hospital.

The hospital has 1,500 beds, which include 650 beds for obstetrics patients, 350 for gynecology patients, 57 for general medical care, and 500 for children. Floor space of the hospital is 60,000 m^{2} on 13 floors and 2,030 rooms. There is also a library with 100,000 volumes.

The hospital trains North Korean nurses and midwives for work outside of Pyongyang. North Korean sources claim that women's health care services can be provided via telemedicine to hospitals and clinics outside Pyongyang.

=== Breast Cancer Research Center ===
Kim Jong Un gave orders to build a new wing for the hospital in 2012. The Breast Cancer Research Center, also known as the Breast Cancer Institute, began operating in this wing on 8 October 2012. The institute has a floor space of 8,500 m^{2} on six floors and over 160 rooms. It contains rooms for CT scan and X-ray, and other rooms for medical procedures such as treating tumours. Achieving early diagnosis and regular cancer screening were goals set for the new medical services offered by the institute. There is also office space for research work.

=== Traditional medicine ===
The Pyongyang Maternity Hospital uses both conventional and traditional medicine to treat patients. The hospital has a Department of Traditional Medicine known as The Koryo Medical Gynecology Department. Traditional medicine is used for treating obstetrics and gynecology patients. A separate pharmacy for herbal medicine exists, and there are facilities for producing traditional medicines within the hospital. A manufacturing unit for herbal medicines maintains extraction, sterilization, and storage units within the hospital.

Around 60 different traditional medicines were in use as of 2005. Common traditional treatments include cupping therapy, moxibustion, and acupuncture with and without electric charge. Approximately 30 percent of services provided by the hospital are based on traditional medicine.

== Equipment and staff ==
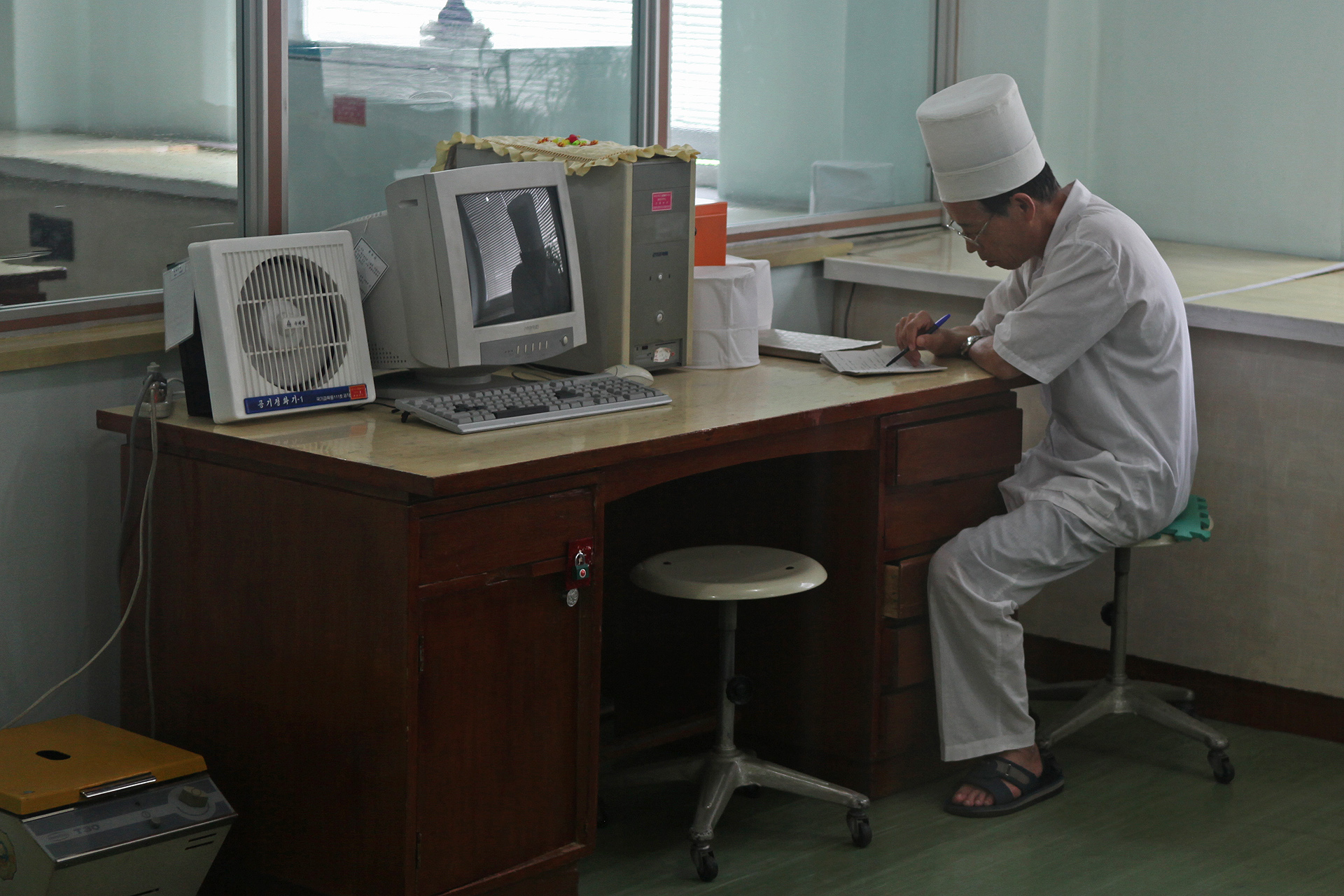
A doctor working in an office.

Kim Song-hui is the director of the Pyongyang Maternity Hospital, and as of 23 July 2015 the vice-director of the hospital is Han Myong-gun. As of 1989 70-percent of the staff was female.

The hospital contains a unique system of visitor booths, which can be accessed directly from the ground floor, to be used by fathers and other family members. This system of closed circuit cameras and televisions is used for video calls. They are meant to protect newborn babies and mothers from infection. Fathers and other visitors may not be in contact with mothers and babies for the first five days after birth, and in the meantime use these booths.

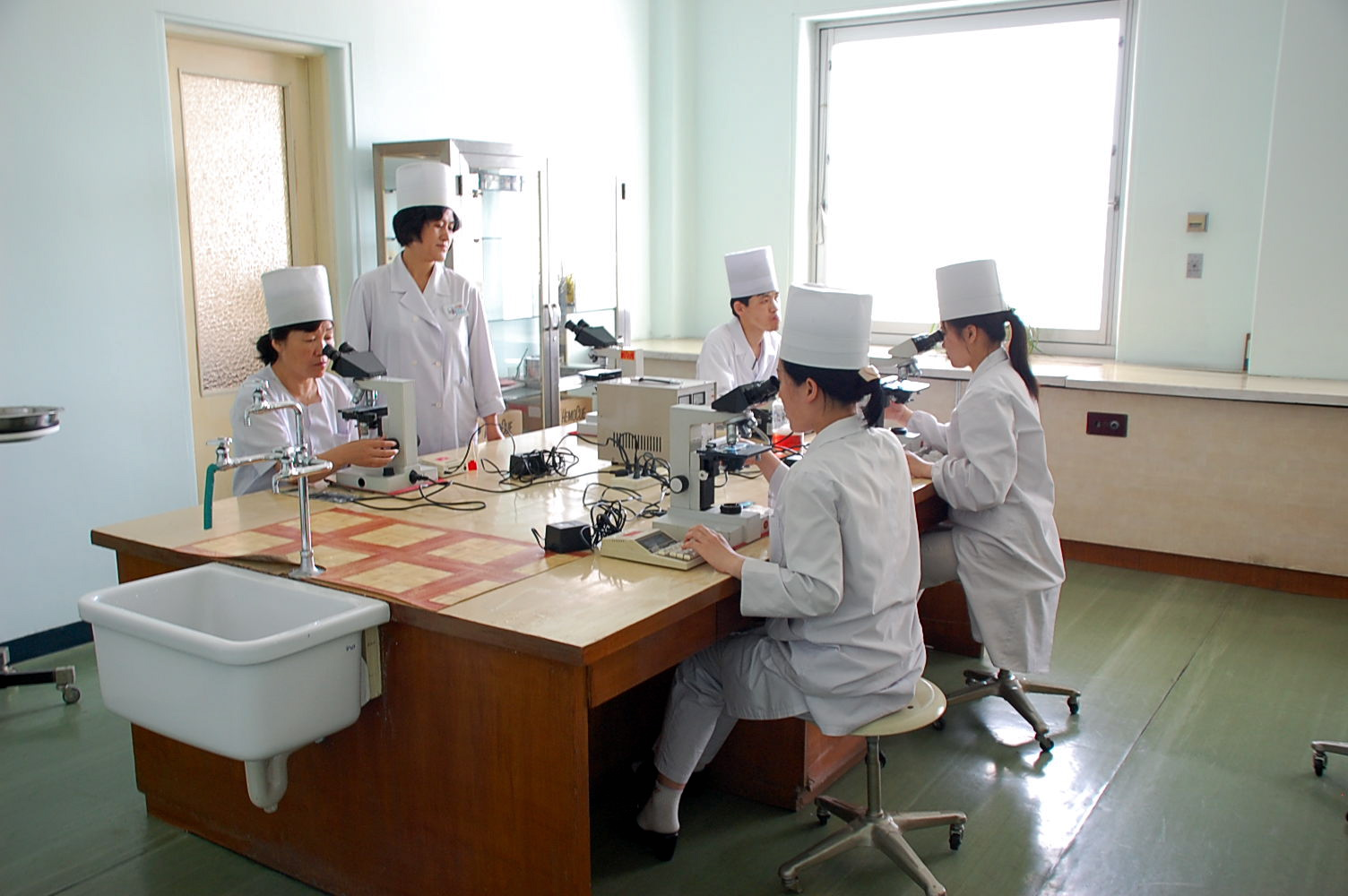
Staff at Pyongyang Maternity Hospital (2008)

The Breast Cancer Research Center was featured on the local news in 2012 after it had received two advanced Siemens medical imaging scanners. North Korea Tech speculated from the news that these were Artis and Somatom Emotion type medical scanners. However, modern medical equipment remains rare in the North Korean healthcare system, despite the presence of some advanced equipment from Siemens. As of February 2009, old equipment dating back from the 1970s was still in use.

Members of the NGO WomenCrossDMZ were told on their visit to the hospital that international sanctions had previously stopped the hospital from obtaining necessary parts for an x-ray machine. Experts have responded unclearly on these claims that the sanctions could cause problems with medicine. However, the x-ray machine contains radioactive materials, which complicates the export of such machines from the United States.

== Patients and visitors ==
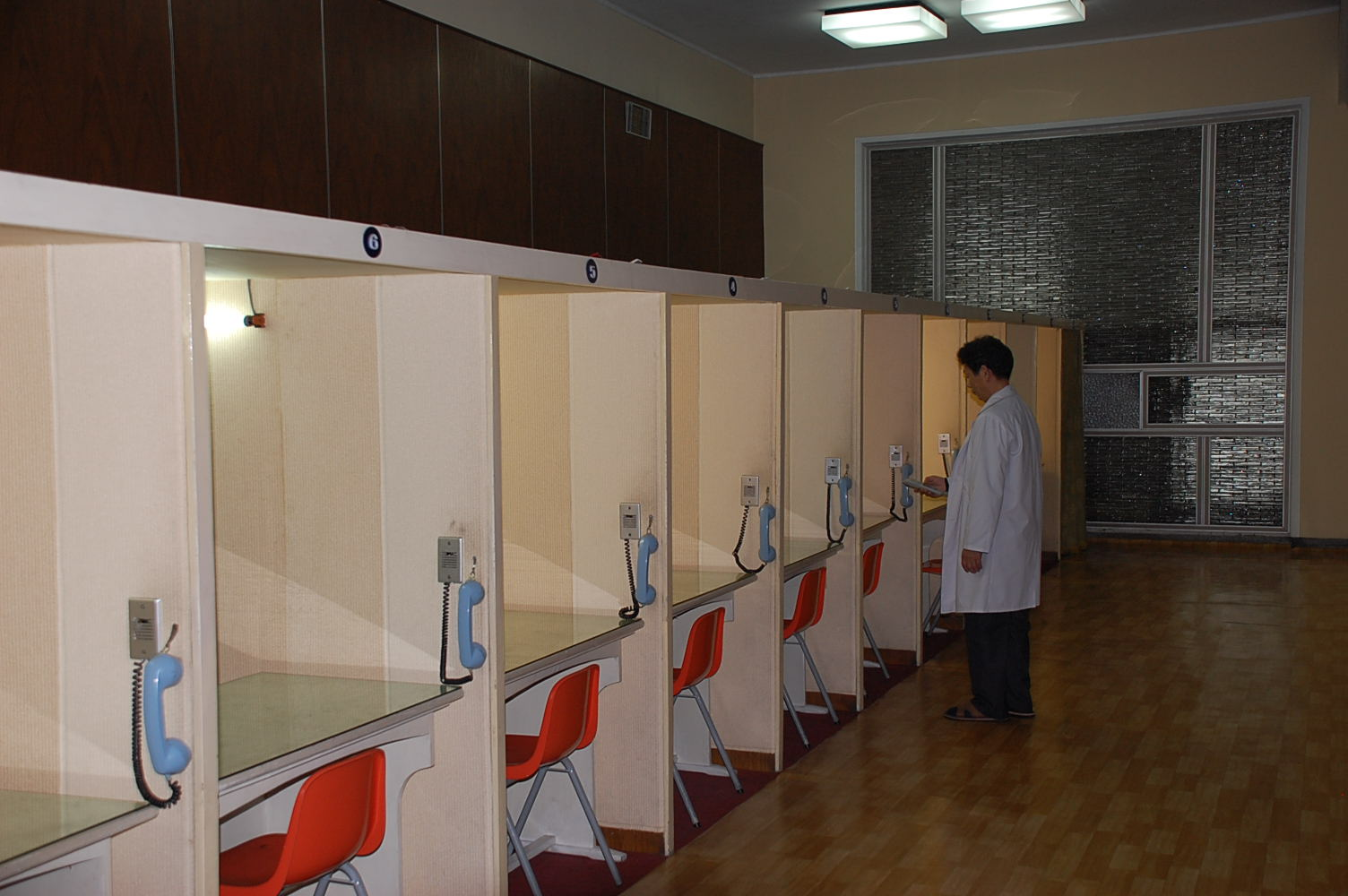
Visitor booths for fathers and other family members.

As of 2014 the daily number of new patients was 400, and it has been estimated that 710,000 children have been born at the hospital. In 2006 around 30 babies were born daily. As of 17 June 2015, 453 triplets have been born in the hospital. The first triplets were born in September 1980.

All mothers from Pyongyang are admitted to the hospital for their first birth. Any North Korean woman may come to give birth to her first baby in the hospital. Mothers typically stay for ten days after giving birth, and those who give birth through a Caesarean section stay for 15 days. However, Chinese media claims that access to the hospital requires a correct background (Songbun) or a connection with an employee of the hospital. In addition, the inability of common people to conveniently travel from city to city adds another barrier to access to hospitals with high-quality treatments, although any parent diagnosed with multiple births will be immediately sent to the hospital.

Mothers who have given birth to triplets and quadruplets are given gifts. Silver knives are given for boys, and gold rings are given to the mothers. Clothes, nutritious food and blankets are also given as gifts and receive further subsidies and care from an assigned medical worker until school age. The children and parents who bore a multiple birth of three or more are cared for in the hospital until they weigh four kilograms. Triplets and above are further cared for within special baby homes until they reach four years of age.

Leader Kim Jong-un has visited and given field guidance at the hospital multiple times. Premiers Kim Yong-nam and Choe Yong Rim have also visited. For instance, premier Choe Yong Rim and other party officials attended the opening ceremony of the Breast Cancer Research Center's new wing on 8 October 2012. He made another field inspection on 30 December 2012.

=== Foreign patients and visitors ===
Foreigners have been treated at the hospital, and many foreign children have been born here, including South Korean, Palestinian, and Cuban children. The first known South Korean baby to be born in North Korea was born on 10 October 2005 to a mother who had come to watch the Arirang Mass Games. The baby was born on the 60th Party Foundation Day. Foreign tourist groups are sometimes allowed to access the hospital.

Lee Hee-ho, the former First Lady of South Korea, visited on 5 August 2015. Some members of the Namibian delegation led by President Sam Nujoma visited the hospital in November 2000.

== Portrayals in North Korean culture ==
External images
- An inside of the camera booth in use.
- Plaque of Baby-Friendly Hospital at the hospital grounds

Our Warm House, a North Korean medical drama television series filmed in 2000, was set in Pyongyang Maternity Hospital.

The hospital has commonly appeared in Korean Central News Agency (KCNA) news articles. Many of these news stories are about cases of triplets, and North Koreans are fascinated by triple births. When asked to explain this fascination, the doctors of the hospital explained that the third baby needs extra care as women only have two breasts for two children. As a result, the government provides help for mothers of triplets. It is thought that triplets are an omen for national prosperity.

== Awards ==
Pyongyang Maternity Hospital and North Pyongan Provincial Maternity Hospital were awarded plaques declaring them a Baby-Friendly Hospital on 5 February 2009 by the UNICEF Thailand office for attaining all ten targets of breastfeeding set by WHO and UNICEF. A reassessment in late 2008 indicated that the hospitals had met the targets. However, South Pyongan Provincial Maternity Hospital, a new candidate for the award, did not meet the breastfeeding standards. Previously the Pyongyang Maternity Hospital and North Pyongan Provincial Maternity Hospital had been awarded in 1996. Director Kim Song-hui stated that in addition to health workers, both community-based and nursery workers will help mothers maintain breastfeeding after their hospital discharge. It was planned that by the end of 2009, there would be seven baby-friendly hospitals in North Korea.

== See also ==
- Birthing center
- Education in North Korea
- Eugene Bell Foundation
- Health in North Korea
- Kang Ha-guk
- Pyongyang#Health care
- Pyongyang Medical University
- Reproductive health
- Women in North Korea
- Women's health
