= O Chun-bok =

North Korean politician

Minister of Public Health

14th term
- In office 11 April 2019 – 18 January 2021
- President: Kim Jong Un
- Premier: Kim Tok-hun; Kim Jae-ryong
- Preceded by: Jang Jun-sang (Korean: 장준상)
- Succeeded by: Choe Kyong-chol

Personal details
- Citizenship: North Korean
- Party: Workers' Party of Korea
- Occupation: Politician

O Chun-bok (Korean: 오춘복) is a North Korean politician. She served as Minister of Health in the Cabinet of North Korea and as candidate member of the Central Committee of the Workers' Party of Korea.

== Biography ==
In 2019 she was appointed as Minister of Health in the Cabinet led by Premier of North Korea, Kim Jae-ryong, and was elected as a candidate for the Central Committee of the Workers 'Party of Korea at the 4th Plenum of the 7th Central Committee of the 7th Congress of the Workers' Party of Korea in April 2019.
