= Oskar von Chelius =

German General and Composer

- Chelius in c. 1910
- Born: 28 July 1859; Mannheim, Grand Duchy of Baden
- Died: 26 June 1923 (aged 63); Munich, Weimar Republic
- Relatives: Maximilian Joseph von Chelius
- Military career
- Allegiance: German Empire
- Branch: Imperial German Army
- Service years: 1881–1919
- Rank: Generalleutnant
- Conflicts: World War I
- Awards: Pour le Mérite
- Other work: composer

Oskar Philipp von Chelius (1859–1923) was a Prussian Generalleutnant who served during World War I as an Adjutant of Emperor Wilhelm II and as a military attaché. He also was a composer.

== Life ==
=== Military career ===
Oskar von Chelius was born on 28 July 1859 at Mannheim, which was part of the Grand Duchy of Baden. He was the first son of his father, Ernst Philipp von Chelius, and a grandson of Maximilian Joseph von Chelius. The latter was ennobled into the Badian aristorcracy in 1866.

In 1881, Chelius entered the Imperial German Army as a Fahnenjunker in the 22nd (3rd Baden) Dragoon Regiment. In 1882, Chelius was appointed as Sekonde-Lieutenant. In 1883, Chelius was transferred to the Life Guards Hussars in Potsdam and later became the regimental adjutant. During military maneuvers in Mark Brandenburg, Chelius and Wilhelm II met and became a great friends.

On 24 December 1890, Chelius was promoted to Prime-Lieutenant. He joined the General Staff. In 1894, Chelius became Rittmeister. In 1895 he served on the staff of the Guards Corps, commanded by Hugo von Winterfeld. In 1896, Chelius became a squadron commander of Life Guards Hussars in Potsdam. In 1898, Chelius served on the staff of the Guards Cavalry Division. In 1899, Chelius became Major.

In 1899, he became an aide-de-camp of Emperor Wilhelm II. Then he was sent to Rome as Imperial Germany's military attaché. In 1906, Chelius returned to Berlin and got the command of Life Guards Hussars. On 11 September 1907, Chelius was promoted to Oberst. In 1910, Chelius became General a la suite of the royal court. In 1911, Chelius was promoted to Generalmajor, and 1914 to Generalleutnant.

Chelius was the German military envoy to the Russian Empire right before World War I. Chelius was appointed as an adjutant general of Wilhelm II on 2 August 1914. At the Imperial Headquarters, he eventfully witnessed the collapse of Imperial authority and the monarchical system. In 1917, he was sent to Belgium as part of the General Government. On 5 November 1918, Chelius became the President of the Commission on Military Orders. He stayed in this position until 8 December 1919 when Chelius retired from the army on his own request. He died at Munich on 26 June 1923.

== As a Composer ==
Chelius also was a highly-skilled composer. He was one of the Emperor's musical friends, like Kuno von Moltke. Wilhelm II liked having musical friends like them and tried to arrange a musical contest.

=== Works ===
Among his musical works are:

- Drei Lieder für eine Singstimme mit Pianoforte. (No. 1. Seligkeit: „Die Bibel ist ein heilig Buch“. No. 2. „Wenn sich zwei Herzen scheiden“. No. 3. Frühling und Liebe: „Was grünt das Thal“.), op. 1. Berlin, 1888.
- Drei Lieder (No. 1. Stille Liebe. No. 2. Der schwere Abend. No. 3. Herzig Hexchen.), op. 2. Berlin.
- Drei Mädchenlieder, op. 3. Berlin.
- Fest-Marsch für Kavallerie-Musik, op. 4. Berlin, 1889.
- Barcarolle für Pianoforte, op. 6. Berlin, 1888.
- Drei Lieder für eine Singstimme mit Pianoforte. (No. 1. Der Buchenbaum: „Es steht im Walde ein Buchenbaum“. No. 2. „Von Grund des Herzens“. No. 3. Vorüber: „Mein Liebchen, wir sassen beisammen“.), op. 7. Berlin, 1889.
- Drei Lieder für eine Singstimme mit Begleitung des Klaviers (No.1. Ahnung (Felix Dahn), No. 2. Säerspruch (Conrad Ferdinand Meier), No. 3. Nachklingen (Osterwald)), op. 8. Berlin.
- Drei Lieder für eine Singstimme mit Pianoforte. (No. 1. Waldritt: „Das war ein köstlich Reiten“. No. 2. Lied des Waisenknaben: „Bin ein armer Waisenknab’“. No. 3. „Weisst du noch, wie ich am Felsen“.), op. 9. Berlin, 1890.
- 2 Consolations für Pianoforte, op. 10. Leipzig, 1893.
- Sonate (G-Dur) für Pianoforte und Violine, op. 11. Leipzig, 1891.
- Marsch König Umberto, op. 12. Berlin, 1893.
- Drei Gedichte von Goethe für eine Singstimme mit Pianoforte. (No. 1. Das Schreien: „Einst ging ich meinem Mädchen nach“. No. 2. „Ihr verblühet, süsse Rosen“. No. 3. Wunsch eines jungen Mädchens: „O fände für mich ein Bräutigam sich“.), op. 13. Berlin, 1893.
- Gebetwasser („Geh' nicht hinaus zur Stunde“ (Carmen Sylva)), Lied, op. 14. Berlin, 1893.
- Haschisch. Oper in einem Aufzug. Musik von Siegfried Berger (Pseudonym von Oskar von Chelius). Dichtung von Axel Delmar. Uraufführung 17. Februar 1897 unter Ernst von Schuch in Dresden (Hofoper)
- Drei Gedichte für eine Singstimme mit Pianoforte. (No. 1. Die Äuglein: „Nun bin ich gekommen“. No. 2. Zu später Stunde: „Mein Sinn ist trunken“. No. 3. Die Bachstelze: „Die kleine flinke Müllerin“.), op. 16. Berlin, 1898.
- Die vernarrte Prinzeß (1904). Ein Fabelspiel in drei Aufzügen (Oper). Libretto: Otto Julius Bierbaum. Uraufführung 15. Januar 1905 in Schwerin, zweite Aufführungsserie im Mai 1905 in Wiesbaden.
- Bühnenmusik zu Heinrich von Kleist's "Prinz Friedrich von Homburg". Berlin, 1907.
- Requiem (Seele, vergiß sie nicht); Gedicht von Friedrich Hebbel für gemischten Chor und Orchester. Berlin, 1909.
- Andante für Violoncello und Klavier, op.23. Berlin, 1910.
- Schottische Sage. Ballade von Feodora, Prinzessin zu Schleswig Holstein, für eine Singstimme mit Begleitung des Pianoforte. Mainz, 1911.
- Drei Gedichte von Feodora, Prinzessin zu Schleswig Holstein, für eine Singstimme mit Begleitung des Pianoforte. No. 1. Einsam ... No. 2. Ein Märchen. No. 3. Wunderstrasse. Mainz 1911.
- Der 121. Psalm ("Ich hebe meine Augen auf zu den Bergen"); für gemischten Chor, Soli, Orgel und Orchester. Berlin, 1912.
- Drei Gedichte für eine Singstimme mit Pianoforte. (No. 1. Der Rose Sprache: „Stumm ist der roten Rose Sprache“. No. 2. „Wir sind allein, in deine Hände“. No. 3. Mondschein: „Im Schlafe liegt mein Schätzchen klein“.). Berlin, 1913.
- Bühnenmusik zu Paul Claudel's "Verkündigung". UA: Hellerau, 1913.
- Vier Gedichte für eine Singstimme mit Pianoforte. (No. 1. Mein Grab: „Ich hab' ein Grab gegraben“. No. 2. Schlaflos: „Aus Träumen und Ängsten bin ich erwacht“. No. 3. Frage und Antwort: „Fragst du mich, woher die bange Liebe“. No. 4. „Schlafen, schlafen, nichts als schlafen“), op. 24. Berlin, 1915.
- Bühnenmusik zu Johann Wolfgang von Goethe's "Clavigo". Berlin, 1918.
- Heimkehr ("Er kehrte nicht heim" (Rainer Maria Rilke)), Lied für eine Singstimme und Pianoforte, op. 25.
- Drei Gedichte für eine Singstimme mit Pianoforte. (No. 1. Der dunkle Flecken: „Mein Lieb, du weisse Taube“. No. 2. „Zwei Wandrer gingen den Weg entlang“. No. 3. Dein Alles: „Ich möchte deine Blume sein“.), op. 26. Leipzig, 1920.
- Magda Maria (1920). Oper in 3 Aufzügen. Libretto: Max Treutler, op. 27. Uraufführung 1920 Dessau.
- Und Pippa tanzt! (1922; op. 28). Symphonische Dichtung (nach dem gleichnamigen Stück von Gerhart Hauptmann)

== Bibliography ==
- Röhl, John C. G. (2004). Wilhelm II: The Kaiser's Personal Monarchy, 1888-1900. Cambridge University Press. ISBN 978-0-521-81920-6.
- Röhl, John C. G. (1998). Young Wilhelm: The Kaiser's Early Life, 1859-1888. Cambridge University Press. ISBN 978-0-521-49752-7.
