= Heidelberg University Eye Clinic =

The Heidelberg University Eye Hospital (Augenklinik in German) is one of twelve hospitals or clinics that make up the Heidelberg University Hospital. It is one of the most renowned and oldest Eye Hospitals in the Federal Republic of Germany with a lineage of ophthalmic surgeons of international standing. Located in the Kopfklinik on the Im Neuenheimerfeld Campus of the University of Heidelberg, it was prior to that in the city's Bergheim district. 2018 represents 150 years since the appointment of the first professorial chair in ophthalmology and the first building of the University Hospital Eye Clinic. One of the most famous alumni of the Heidelberg Eye Hospital was Dr José Rizal, (1861–1896), the Filipino martyr and national hero.

== History of Heidelberg University Eye Hospital ==
The tradition of the practice of ophthalmic surgery and training in the specialty in Heidelberg can be traced back to at least 1818 when Maximillian Joseph von Chelius was nominated for the first professorial chair for surgery and ophthalmic surgery. At that time ophthalmology was part of the department of surgery. But Chelius specialized in ophthalmic surgery and he is regarded as the father of ophthalmology in Heidelberg. In the 1860s Prof. Hermann Knapp made architectural plans for the first Eye Clinic building. Prof. Otto Becker took the first official chair in Ophthalmology in the University Hospital Eye Clinic, in 1868.

Notable dates and list of eye surgeons and medical directors of the Heidelberg University Eye Clinic:

- 1818 to 1864 Maximilian Josef Chelius is appointed to the first professorial chair of surgery and ophthalmic surgery.
- 1861 to 1868 Hermann Knapp
- 1868 Foundation of the Heidelberg University Eye Hospital
- 1868 to 1890 Otto Becker
- 1890 to 1910 Theodor Leber
- 1910 to 1934 August Wagenmann
- 1934 to 1957 Ernst Engelking
- 1958 to 1986 Wolfgang Jäger
- 1986 to 2009 Hans-Eberhard Völcker
- 2009 to present Gerd Uwe Auffarth

The Heidelberg University Eye Hospital is celebrating in 2018 its 150th anniversary.

== Jose Rizal ==
One of the most famous alumni of the Heidelberg Eye Hospital was Dr José Rizal, (1861–1896), the Filipino martyr and national hero from the time of the closing period of Spanish colonial rule of the Philippines. Rizal was an ophthalmologist who had trained in Europe, in Madrid, Paris, Berlin and Heidelberg.

In 1886 he came from Paris to Heidelberg to study under Prof. Dr. Otto Becker. It was in Heidelberg that he learned to use the newly invented ophthalmoscope (invented by the Heidelberg University Professor of Physiology from 1858 to 1871 Hermann von Helmholtz) to later operate on his own mother's eye. He lived in a Karlstraße boarding house then moved to Ludwigsplatz (now called Grabengasse). While in Heidelberg, Rizal wrote his parents: "I spend half of the day in the study of German and the other half, in the diseases of the eye. Twice a week, I go to the bierbrauerie, or beerhall, to speak German with my student friends."

In 1887, the 25-year-old Rizal completed his ophthalmic specialisation .

A plaque dedicated to his memory is placed on the front wall of the Old Building of the Eye Hospital at Bergheimer Straße 20.
