= Ministry of Public Health (North Korea) =

Government agency in North Korea

Agency overview
- Formed: September 2, 1948
- Minister responsible: Choe Kyong-chol, Minister of Public Health
- Website: www.moph.gov.kp/en/

Korean name
- Hangul: 보건성
- Hanja: 保健省
- RR: Bogeonseong
- MR: Pogŏnsŏng

The Ministry of Public Health (Korean: 보건성) is a central administrative agency of the Cabinet of North Korea. It was founded on September 2, 1948, when the Cabinet of North Korea was established. Since January 2021, the Minister of Public Health is Choe Kyong-Chol.

The Ministry operates the Pugang Pharmaceutic Company.

== Former ministers ==
1. Li Pyong-nam September 2, 1948 ~ November 30, 1948 Dec. 1, 1948-Sep. 30, 1949, October 1, 1949 ~ September 20, 1957, September 20, 1957 ~ December 1958, July 6, 1959 ~ 1960
2. Choi Chang-seok October 23, 1962 ~
3. Li Lakbin December 16, 1967 ~ December 27, 1967 General Manager, December 28, 1967 ~ 1972, General Manager December 15, 1977 to 1980,
4. Myung-Bin Park, General Manager, 1980 ~ April 4, 1982, General Manager, April 5, 1982 ~ December 28, 1986, General Manager
5. Lee Jong-yul December 29, 1986 ~, Manager, May 24, 1990 ~, Manager
6. Kim Soo-hak September 1, 1998 ~ October 2006
7. Choi Chang-sik: October 2006 ~ April 2013
8. Kang Ha-guk: April 2013 ~ 2017
9. Jang Jun-sang: 2017 ~ 2019
10. O Chun-bok: 2019- 2021
11. Choe Kyong-chol (Korean: 최경철): January 18, 2021 - present

== See also ==
- Health in North Korea
