= German Society of Cataract and Refractive Surgery =

Medical association

The German Society of Cataract and Refractive Surgery (DGII, Deutschsprachige Gesellschaft für Intraokularlinsen-Implantation, interventionelle und refraktive Chirurgie) is the professional medical association of eye surgeons from Germany, Austria and Switzerland (members also hail from other European countries) who specialize in treating cataract and refractive errors. Its office is based in Düsseldorf, Germany. The society, a nonprofit organization under German law, was founded in 1986 when implanting intraocular lenses (IOL) became standard in cataract surgery. The DGII holds an annual scientific meeting which besides cataract and refractive surgery also covers cornea diseases, glaucoma and retina. The society is closely associated with the European Society of Cataract and Refractive Surgery (ESCRS). In the context of this cooperation, the DGII is involved in the publication of one of the leading peer-reviewed journals in the field of eye surgery, the Journal of Cataract and Refractive Surgery (JCRS).

The society publishes regular updates and congress reports in ophthalmological journals as well as annual volume of its congress proceedings. During its meetings, an annual science award is given each year to an outstanding contributor to progress in ophthalmology, among the awardees are Theo Seiler from Switzerland, Gerrit Melles from the Netherlands, Rudy Nuijts from the Netherlands, Hiroko Bissen-Miyajiwa from Japan and Günther Grabner from Austria.

The DGII conducts an annual poll among European eye surgeons about their preferred techniques and success rates to evaluate current and potential future procedures. The current board consists of, among others, Christopher Wirbelauer, Gerd Auffarth and Burkhard Dick. Since the beginning of the COVID-19 pandemic, the annual DGII meeting is held as a hybrid event.
