= Basic Medicine =

North Korean general medical journal

- October 2022 issue cover
- Discipline: Medical science
- Language: Korean

Publication details
- History: 1969–present
- Publisher: Science and Encyclopedia Publishing House (North Korea)
- Frequency: Quarterly

Indexing
- ISSN: 1728-0338
- OCLC no.: 70664592

Basic Medicine (Korean: 기초의학; MR: Kich'o ŭihak) is a North Korean quarterly general medical journal established in 1969 and published by the Science and Encyclopedia Publishing House (과학백과사전출판사). The journal is subject to widespread publication bias and does not meet international standards; it lacks peer review, in-line citations, and an ethical code. Basic Medicine is produced primarily for domestic distribution, although it is one of ten North Korean medical journals available in South Korea.

== Format ==
North Korean medical journals, including Basic Medicine, are broadly far from international standard. Each issue of Basic Medicine begins with a quotation from the ruling Kim family, a table of contents, and two or three unsigned editorials that reflect the government's positions. The following section, titled "Research Results", consists of articles filed under "General Remarks and Data", "Original Idea", "News", and "Legal Commentary". Articles for the journal include the names of the authors, but fail to include any other biographical information like institutional affiliation. Articles published in the journal rarely exceed two pages, lack abstracts, and rarely make use of tables, graphs, or images, which are commonly drawn by hand.

The journal's rear cover includes various publication information, though the journal has sometimes omitted this information. Like other North Korean scientific journals, the journal does not mention any submission guidelines, an ethical code, a peer review process (though it does indicate that there is an editorial committee), or a subscription model.

== Research ==
The journal covers topics relating to "the basic structure and functions of the human body", including diseases, the human body, and diagnostic technologies. Research published in the journal sometimes cites Chinese or Western authors, including from the British Journal of Cancer and Human Pathology, though the journal lacks up-to-date references. While articles published in the journal include some statistics, including p-values, they largely lack any specific statistical methods and lack epidemiological indices. North Korean propaganda is a consistent feature of the journal, and the journal is subject to widespread publication bias. The journal also lacks in-line citations, and articles rarely cite more than six references.

Research published in Basic Medicine in 2013 suggested that malaria prevention efforts in the country were hurt by the rise of drug-resistant variants. Yonsei University public health professor Lee Hoon-sang noted that reports published in the journal demonstrated that the country had the ability to conduct PCR testing.

== Readership ==
Basic Medicine is primarily published for domestic distribution. According to North Korea's Great Korean Encyclopedia, the journal's main readership comprises medical researchers, professionals, and educators. Basic Medicine is one of ten North Korean medical journals available in South Korea.

== See also ==
- Health in North Korea
- Education in North Korea
