= Ponghwa Clinic =

- North Korean Ministry of Public Health

Geography
- Location: Sinwŏn-dong, Potonggang-guyok, Pyongyang,, North Korea
- Coordinates: 39°2′4.00″N 125°44′35.22″E

Organisation
- Type: Hospital for political elite

Services
- Emergency department: Yes

Helipads
- Helipad: Yes

History
- Former name: Government Hospital or the Bonghwa Clinic
- Constructed: 1968 to 1971
- Opened: 1971

Links
- Lists: Hospitals in North Korea

The Ponghwa Clinic and Hospital (Korean: 봉화진료소; Hanja: 烽火診療所) (Note: Alternatively known as the Government Hospital or the Bonghwa Clinic) is a hospital located in Sinwŏn-dong, Potonggang-guyok, Pyongyang, North Korea, and is believed to be one of the top hospitals in North Korea, treating members of the political elite. It is administered by the Ministry of Public Health.

== History ==
Construction on the clinic began in 1968, on orders from Kim Il Sung. The Clinic opened in 1971. The clinic underwent a series of expansions in 2003–2005 and 2009–2010.

== Patients ==
Access to Ponghwa is restricted to members of North Korea's political elite, and the existence of the hospital is secret within North Korea.

== Facilities ==
The clinic has a helipad. It is reportedly one of the few hospitals in North Korea capable of performing complex surgeries.

== Controversy ==
The Clinic has been linked to the biological warfare program of North Korea.

== See also ==
- Ponghwa Revolutionary Site – nearby historical site
