= Gerd U. Auffarth =

German eye surgeon (born 1964)

Gerd Auffarth
- Born: Gerd Uwe Auffarth; 28 July 1964
- Citizenship: German
- Education: Aachen University of Technology; Albert Schweitzer Hospital; Medical University of South Carolina
- Known for: Cataract surgery Intraocular lens Health in North Korea
- Spouse: Jin Young Cecilia Auffarth
- Scientific career
- Workplaces: Heidelberg University Eye Hospital

Gerd Uwe Auffarth (MD, FEBO) (born 28 July 1964) is a German eye surgeon and is Chairman of the Department of Ophthalmology at the Heidelberg University Eye Hospital and Head of the David J. Apple Center for Vision Research which includes the David J. Apple International Laboratory for Ocular Pathology.

== Background ==
Gerd Auffarth was born in Delmenhorst near Bremen, North Germany, the fourth child of Arthur and Emma Auffarth. He grew up in Delmenhorst and in Remscheid near Cologne.

== Career ==
Auffarth graduated from Medical School Aachen, Aachen University of Technology (RWTH Aachen), Germany in 1990.

Prior to pursuing a career in research and training in ophthalmology, as a fourth year medical student in 1988, he was awarded an Albert Schweitzer Fellowship® to spend three months at the Albert Schweitzer Hospital in Lambaréné, Gabon. There he worked as a junior physician in medicine rotations,(tropical medicine, paediatrics), supervised by hospital medical staff. In 1989 Auffarth published an account (written in German) and illustrated with photographs of his time at the hospital.

In 1992, he was recipient of a Max Kade postdoctoral research grant (Max Kade Foundation, New York, NY, US) and became a research fellow of David J Apple at his Center for Intraocular Lens Research, Storm Eye Institute, Department of Ophthalmology, Medical University of South Carolina, Charleston, SC, USA. Auffarth worked with Prof. Apple between August 1992 and September 1994 in the laboratory that Apple later renamed as David J. Apple International Laboratory for Ocular Pathology.

Returning to Germany, Auffarth continued his research with a project in “Genetic degenerative retinal diseases“ funded by the German Research Council (DFG) at the Heidelberg University Eye Clinic; he completed his Residency and board certification in Ophthalmology in Heidelberg in December 1996; and was awarded the title of Privatdozent and Venia Legendi for Ophthalmology in 1999.

In 2004 he was appointed vice chairman and deputy director of the Heidelberg Department of Ophthalmology; he was awarded Extraordinary professorship in the Medical Faculty of the University of Heidelberg in May 2005; and appointed as Chairman of the Department of Ophthalmology in April 2011 (having been acting chairman since March 2009).

== North Korea ==
In 2006, Auffarth was permitted to visit North Korea and he reported on his visit in a video entitled, Ophthalmology Behind the Iron Curtain: Cataract Surgery in North Korea- the video was released in 2011.

He is one of the few Western surgeons to have carried out eye surgery in North Korea. Before he arrived in Pyongyang, he was authorized to do just five surgeries but once he reached the University Hospital he found that he could do seventeen: one perforating keratoplasty using donor tissue he had brought from Germany, three scleral-fixated secondary IOL implantations, and thirteen phacoemulsification procedures with IOL implants. All the procedures were conducted with topical anaesthesia which had been brought from Germany. He reported on his experiences, saying that the economic conditions have led to improvisations - especially because of the absence of consumable medical devices - but he commented that once a visiting surgeon adapts to these unique surroundings, he found that teaching and clinical work could be very effective and satisfying for both surgeon and patient.

As a consequence of this visit, in 2007 two young North Korean ophthalmic surgeons were permitted to visit Heidelberg and remain for six months, gaining extensive training in eye surgery.

== The DGII Society ==
Gerd Auffarth became secretary of the Deutschsprachige Gesellschaft für Intraokularlinsen-Implantation, interventionelle und refraktive Chirurgie (German Society of Cataract and Refractive Surgery (DGII) from 2002 to 2010; and the Society's President from March 2012 to February 2016. and Vice President in 2017.

In 2018, he was appointed as the General Secretary of the DGII.

== Recognition, Honours and awards ==
Auffarth is a Fellow of the European Board of Ophthalmology (FEBO).

In April 2018, the Ophthalmologist online magazine published its 2018 Powerlist of the World's Top 100 most influential people in the world of ophthalmology. The list includes surgeons, scientists, engineers and CEOs in the ophthalmic device and pharmaceutical industries. Dr. Donald Tang from Singapore was voted number 1 by the magazine's readership. In second place is Gerd Auffarth.

== See also ==
- Ophthalmology
- Cataract Surgery
- Harold Ridley (ophthalmologist)
- Intraocular lens
- Health in North Korea
- David J Apple
- Heidelberg University Eye Clinic
- The International Intra-Ocular Implant Club (IIIC)
