= Ponghwa Revolutionary Site =

- Interactive map of Ponghwa Revolutionary Site
- 39°10′7″N 126°0′28″E
- Type: Revolutionary Site
- Location: Kangdong County, Pyongyang

- Ponghwa Revolutionary Site
- Hangul: 봉화혁명사적지
- Hanja: 烽火革命史蹟地
- RR: Bonghwa hyeongmyeong sajeokji
- MR: Ponghwa hyŏngmyŏng sajŏkchi

Ponghwa Revolutionary Site is a Revolutionary Site in Kangdong County, Pyongyang in North Korea.

The site is associated with Kim Hyong-jik, the father of North Korea's first leader Kim Il Sung. Kim Hyong-jik lived in Ponghwa between mid-March 1916 and November 1917. At that time, he was teaching at the nearby Myongsin School. Kim had helped founding the school. According to North Korean tradition, Kim helped organizing resistance to the Japanese occupation of Korea in Ponghwa by holding secret meetings of various clandestine groups. These efforts culminated in the establishment of the Korean National Association.

The site consists of the school, a statue of Kim Hyong-jik, a monument to his revolutionary activities, the Pisok-gye Monument, ground for morning exercises, the Rock Floor, the Maekjon Ferry, dwellings, a shallow well, and a place on Mount Ponghwa were secret meetings were held. The Ponghwa-ri Revolutionary Museum on the premises opened in 2004 houses historical artifacts related to Kim Hyong-jik.

In 2009, the Korean Central News Agency (KCNA) put visitor figures as follows: "During the past more than four decades since the revolutionary site was opened to visitors it has drawn nearly 16 million people." As of 2012, more than 1.7 million people have visited the site since 2000.

== See also ==
- Ponghwa Clinic – nearby hospital
