= Burkhard Dick =

German ophthalmologist (born 1963)

- Born: Brake, Germany
- Known for: refractive surgery, cataract surgery with femtosecond laser
- Scientific career
- Fields: Ophthalmology
- Workplaces: University of Bochum Medical School

Burkhard Dick (born 1963 in Brake, Lower Saxony) is a German ophthalmologist who has specialized in refractive and cataract surgery. With his many contributions to the scientific literature on this topic, he is considered one of the pioneers of employing the femtosecond laser in cataract surgery. In the "Power List 2024" by the publication The Ophthalmologist, Burkhard Dick was listed among the world's most 100 most influential ophthalmologists.

== Biography ==
Dick attended high school in his hometown of Brake and graduated in 1983. After studying medicine at University of Giessen, he began his specialization as an eye surgeon. As a board certified ophthalmologist, Dick in 1996 joined the eye hospital of the University of Mainz where he became a full professor in 2003. In 2006, Dick was appointed chair of the department of ophthalmology at the University of Bochum and director of the University Eye Clinic. He turned the clinic into one of the surgical centers with the highest number of cataract patients treated with the femtosecond laser, a new technology which has the potential to improve the precision of cataract surgery which is the most frequent surgical intervention in North America and Europe. Burkhard Dick has been president of the German Society of Cataract and Refractive Surgery (DGII) from 2016 to 2020; currently he acts as the society's treasurer. Dick is an elected council member and the Secretary (since 2023) of the European Society of Cataract and Refractive Surgeons (ESCRS) and chairman of the society's Research Committee; his term as President of the ESCRS began in January 2026. The 44th ESCRS Congress, held in London in September 2026 under Dick’s leadership, was the world’s largest ophthalmology congress that year, attracting more than 18,000 participants.

== Scientific contributions ==
Dick has published a large number of scientific articles and book chapters on various issues in eye surgery. He has informed the medical community about his experience with the femtosecond laser in special cases like patients with Marfan syndrome, with advanced cataracts, in pediatric cataracts and in individuals who had undergone corneal refractive surgery or are suffering from corneal disease. Dick is also considered a pioneer in Minimally invasive glaucoma surgery (MIGS) and has lectured widely on the advantages of this technique to treat glaucoma as well as on the limitations of some of these implants. He is the editor of two recent books that have become standard works for eye surgeons globally, on the femtosecond laser in ophthalmology and, published in 2022, on cataract surgery in difficult situations (see publication list).

== Entrepreneurship ==
Both as an innovator and as an investor, Burkhard Dick is involved in the development of new technologies like the miniaturized sensor to measure the intraocular pressure in glaucoma patients and methods to reduce potentially eye damaging blue light exposure of digital devices.

== Awards (selection) ==
- 2008 Leonhard Klein Award from the German Ophthalmological Society (DOG)
- 2010 Gold Medal from the German Society of Ophthalmic Surgeons (DOC)
- 2013 Choyce Medal from the United Kingdom & Ireland Society of Cataract and Refractive Surgeons (UKISCRS)
- 2014 Gold Medal from the Australasian Society of Cataract and Refractive Surgeons (AUSCRS)
- 2015 Waring Medal from the journal ‘Journal of Refractive Surgery’
- 2015 Kritzinger Memorial Award from the American Academy of Ophthalmology (AAO)/International Society of Refractive Surgery (ISRS)
- 2015 Visionary Award from the American European Congress of Ophthalmic Surgery (AECOS)
- 2016 Senior Achievement Award from the American Academy of Ophthalmology (AAO)
- 2018 Ridley Award from the German Ophthalmic Surgeons (DOC)
- 2021 Profession Gold Medal from the International Intraocular Implant Club (IIIC)
- 2024 Scientific Award from the German Society of Cataract and Refractive Surgery (GSCRS/DGII)
- 2027 Kelman Award from the Hellenic Society of Intraocular Implant & Refractive Surgery (HSIOIRS)
- 2027 Cornelius D. Binkhorst Lecture at the American Society of Cataract and Refractive Surgery (ASCRS)
- 2027 Lim Lecture at the Asia Pacific Association of Cataract and Refractive Surgeons (APACRS)

== Memberships ==
- American Society of Cataract and Refractive Surgery (ASCRS)
- European Society of Cataract and Refractive Surgeons (ESCRS)
- American-European Congress of Ophthalmic Surgery (AECOS)
- International Intra-Ocular Implant Club (IIIC)
- European Vision Institute Clinical Research Network (EVICR)
- German Ophthalmological Society (Deutsche Ophthalmologische Gesellschaft, DOG)
- Professional Association of German Ophthalmologists (Berufsverband der Augenärzte Deutschlands, BVA)
- German Society for intraocular lens implantation (Deutschsprachige Gesellschaft für Intraokularlinsen-Implantation, interventionelle und refraktive Chirurgie, DGII)

== Selected publications ==
- with CN Englisch, AM Trouvain, P Wakili, K Mansouri, EM Hoffmann, MJ Mackert, KT Boden, P Szurman: Long-Term Patient Acceptability and Adherence to Suprachoroidal Telemetric Intraocular Pressure Monitoring in Glaucoma. In: Journal of Glaucoma 2026;35(6):377-385.
- with F Ribeiro, T Kohnen, O Findl, R Nuijts, B Cochener, JJ Fernández: Evidence-based functional classification of simultaneous vision intraocular lenses: seeking a global consensus by the ESCRS Functional Vision Working Group. In:Cataract and Refractive Surgery 2024;50(8):794-798. doi: 10.1097/j.jcrs.0000000000001502.
- with JL Alio, RH Osher: Cataract surgery : advanced techniques for complex and complicated cases Springer Nature, Cham (Switzerland) 2022. ISBN 9783030945299
- with RD Gerste: Future Intraocular Lens Technologies. In: Ophthalmology, published online 26 December 2020.
- Future perspectives of the femtosecond laser in anterior segment surgery. In: Der Ophthalmologe. May 2020;117(5):431-436.
- Small-aperture strategies for the correction of presbyopia. In: Current Opinion in Ophthalmology. 2019 Jul;30(4):236-242.
- with T. Schultz: Influence of the vitreolenticular interface in pediatric cataract surgery. In: Journal of Cataract and Refractive Surgery. 2019 Mar;45(3):388.
- with T. Schultz, RD Gerste: Femtosecond Laser in Ophthalmology. Thieme Publishing, New York 2018, ISBN 9781626232365.
- with Federica Gualdi, Luca Gualdi et al.:Femto Laser Cataract Surgery. Jaypee Brothers Medical Publishing, New Delhi 2014, ISBN 978-93-5090-989-8.
- with Oliver Schwenn: Viscoelastics in Ophthalmic Surgery. Springer, Heidelberg 2000, ISBN 9783540673309.
- with T. Schultz: Primary posterior laser-assisted capsulotomy. In: Journal of Refractive Surgery. 30, 2014,128–133.
- with T. Schultz: Laser-assisted cataract surgery in small pupils using mechanical dilation devices. In: Journal of Refractive Surgery. 29, 2013, 858–862.
- with I. Conrad-Hengerer, F. H. Hengerer, T. Schultz: Effect of femtosecond laser fragmentation on effective phacoemulsification time in cataract surgery. In: Journal of Rrefractive Surgery. 28,2012,879–883.
