= Kang Ha-guk =

North Korean health minister (born 1952)

Minister of Public Health

14th term
- In office April 2013 – 2017
- President: Kim Jong Un
- Premier: Kim Tok-hun; Kim Jae-ryong
- Preceded by: Choe Chang-sik
- Succeeded by: Jang Jun-sang

Personal details
- Born: 25 April 1952 (age 73)
- Citizenship: North Korean
- Party: Workers' Party of Korea
- Occupation: Politician

Korean name
- Hangul: 강하국
- RR: Gang Haguk
- MR: Kang Haguk

Kang Ha-guk (Korean: 강하국, born 25 April 1952) was the Minister of Public Health of North Korea from 2013 to 2017, when he was replaced by Jang Jun-sang. He was appointed on April 9, 2014. As of January 2014, he was also reportedly the director of the Central Committee of the Korea-China Friendship Association. He was among the dignitaries who greeted Chinese Vice President Li Yuanchao during his state visit to Pyongyang in July 2013.
