= Maximilian Joseph von Chelius =

German surgeon (1794–1876)

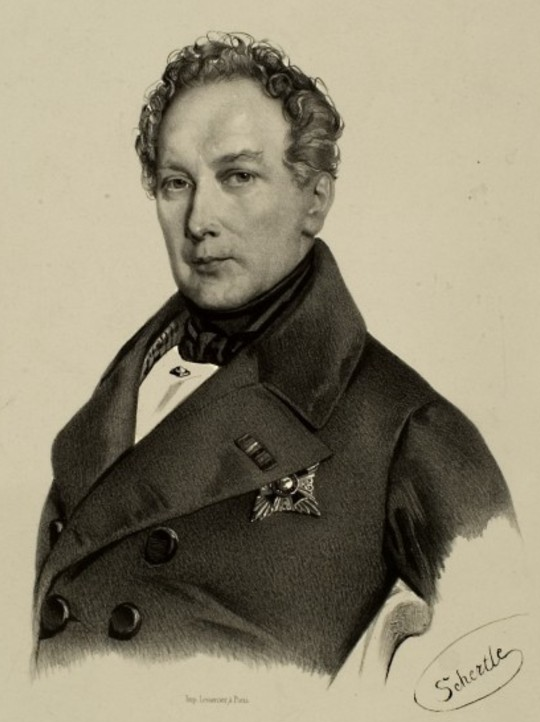
Maximilian Joseph von Chelius

Maximilian Joseph von Chelius (16 January 1794 – 17 August 1876) was a German surgeon and ophthalmologist born in Mannheim.

Chelius received his medical doctorate in 1812 at the University of Heidelberg, and afterwards worked as both a civilian and military physician in Munich. He was an army surgeon in the last phases of the Napoleonic Wars (1814-15). In 1817 he became an associate professor of surgery in Heidelberg, where soon afterwards he gained a full professorship (1819).

He was a catalyst in the development of the medical faculty at the University of Heidelberg, being considered the founder of the surgical tradition at the facility. Chelius specialized in the field of ophthalmic surgery.

One of his better-known patients was composer Frédéric Chopin, whom Chelius treated for sepsis of the finger. Afterwards, a grateful Chopin gave a private concert in Chelius' home. Today, the building where Chelius lived from 1830 until 1876 is the site of the Kurpfälzisches Museum in Heidelberg.

His grandson, Oskar von Chelius, was a composer and Imperial German Army general during World War I.

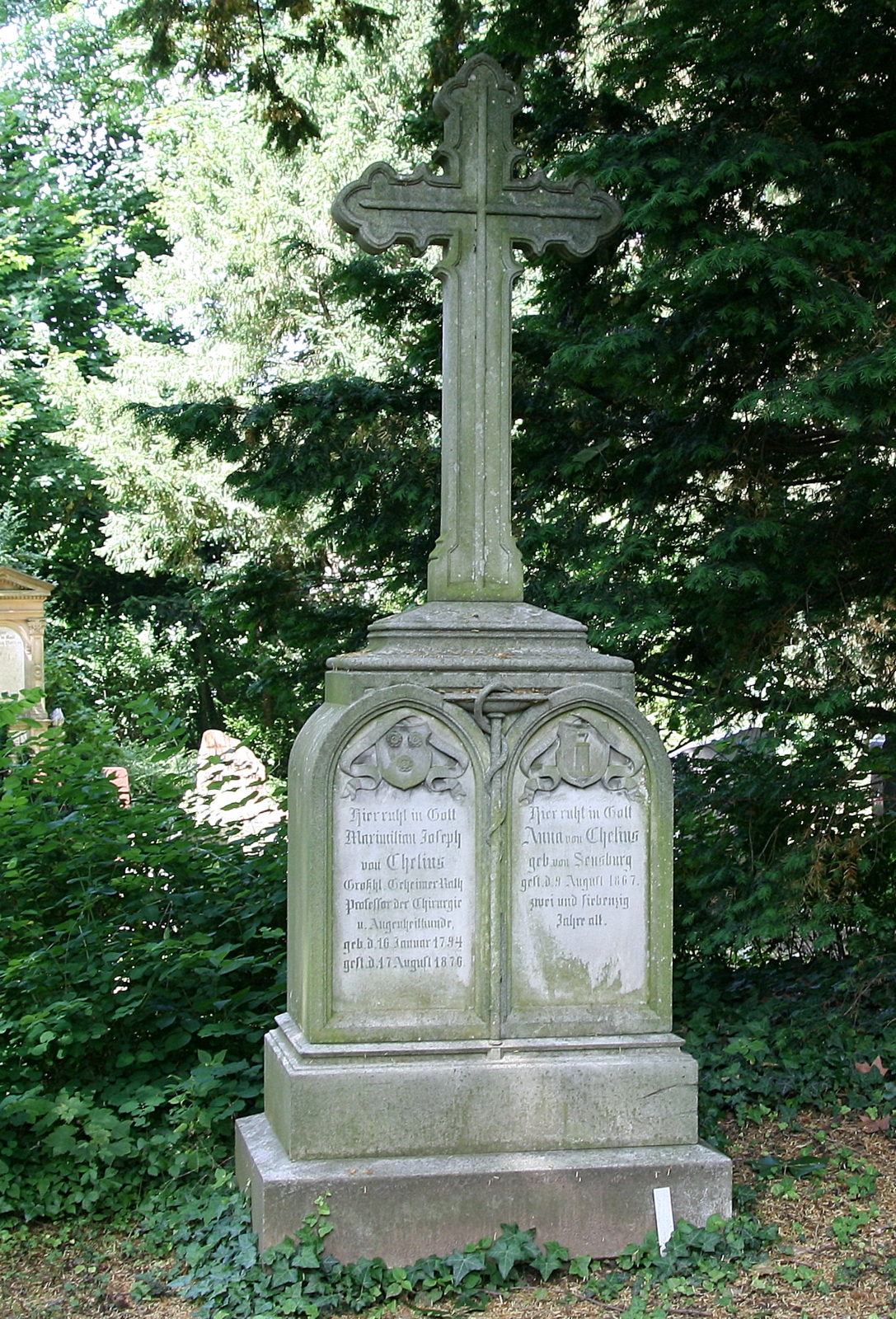
Chelius' grave in Heidelberg

He is also the 4th great-grandfather of the current King of the Netherlands, Willem-Alexander through his son, Franz.

== Selected writings ==
- Handbuch der Chirurgie: zu dem Gebrauche bei seinen Vorlesungen (Manual of surgery, derived from lectures); 1822
- Zur Lehre von den Staphylomen des Auges (Lesson on staphyloma of the eye)
- Handbuch der Augenheilkunde: zu dem Gebrauche bei seinen Vorlesungen (Manual of ophthalmology, derived from lectures); 1844
- Über die durchsichtige Hornhaut des Auges, ihre Function und ihre krankhaften Veränderungen - On the transparent cornea of the eye, its function and pathological changes.
