= Health in North Korea =

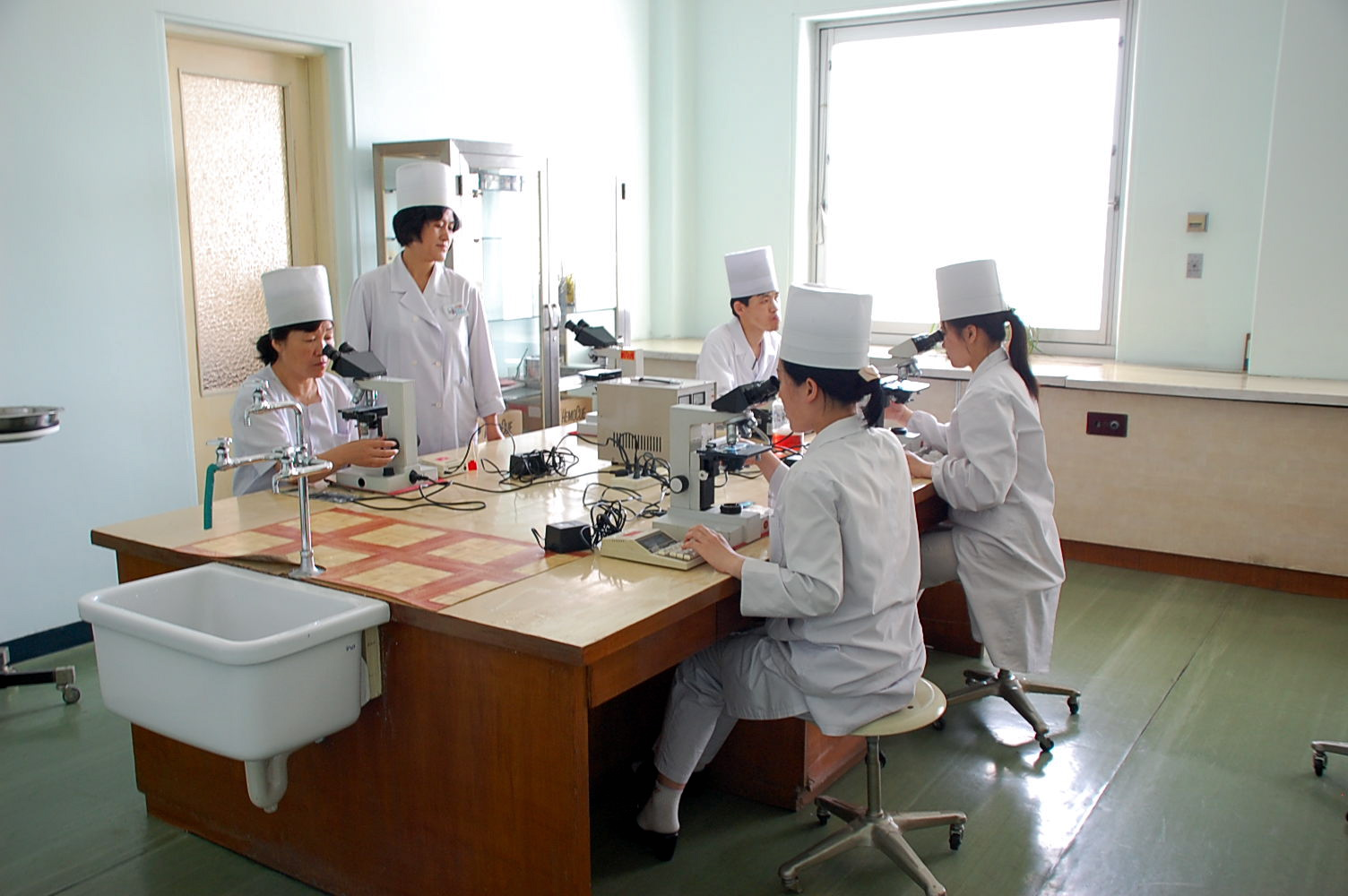
Staff at Pyongyang Maternity Hospital (2008)

North Korea has a life expectancy of 74 years as of 2024. While North Korea is classified as a low-income country, the structure of North Korea's causes of death (2013) is unlike that of other low-income countries. Rather, causes of death are closer to the worldwide averages, with non-communicable diseases – such as cardiovascular disease – accounting for two-thirds of the total deaths.

Historically North Korea claimed to provide universal health care with a national medical service and health insurance system for free. However by 2025, the phrase "Universal Free Healthcare System" had fallen out of usage with the "District Doctor System" and "Preventive Medicine" being emphasised, and hospitals had begun officially listing fees at reception openly.

== Overview ==
In 1946, free, but not universal, healthcare was mandated by North Korea's Social Insurance Law. Beginning in the 1950s, North Korea put great emphasis on healthcare. In 1952 basic universal healthcare was started, and between 1955 and 1986, the number of hospitals grew from 285 to 2,401, and the number of clinics from 1,020 to 5,644.

Most hospitals that exist today in the DPRK were built in the 1960s and 1970s. During the rule of Kim Il Sung, effective mandatory health checkups and immunization programs were initiated. The country could support a large corps of doctors due to their low salaries. The number of doctors remains high, though there is a shortage of nurses, meaning that doctors often have to perform routine procedures. The medical infrastructure is fairly effective in preventive medicine, but less so in terms of treating the more demanding conditions. Since 1979, more emphasis has been put on traditional Korean medicine, based on treatment with herbs and acupuncture. A national telemedicine network was launched in 2010 that connects Kim Man-yu Hospital in Pyongyang with 10 provincial medical facilities.

North Korea's healthcare system suffered a steep decline since the 1990s because of natural disasters, economic problems, and food and energy shortages. In 2001, North Korea spent 3% of its gross domestic product (GDP) on health care, but during that same year, many hospitals and clinics in North Korea lacked essential medications, equipment, and running water due to the international sanctions against North Korea. Electricity shortages remain the biggest problem. Even when sophisticated equipment is available, it is useless without electricity. Some facilities have generators available to meet demand during power outages. Lack of fuel due to sanctions also affects patient transportation and delivery of medical supplies to the countryside.

In his 2013 book The Real North Korea, Andrei Lankov wrote that North Korea's achievements in terms of life expectancy were remarkable for a country so poor, though he did note that most hospitals used outdated equipment and access to drugs was limited. He claimed that North Korea's achievements in healthcare may in large part be due to its nature as a police state enabling a high level of preventive medicine, writing that during the rule of Kim Il-sung the entire population was subjected to regular health checks, which were obligatory for every citizen to attend. Although simple, these checks could detect medical problems in their early stages. In addition, low doctors' salaries enabled the state to field a large number of doctors. However, according to Lankov, the healthcare system was good for "fractured bones of tractor drivers or pneumonia among infantry soldiers" but less equipped to deal with more complicated conditions, with sophisticated surgery available only in hospitals used by the elite and everyone else "left to their sorry fate if they were unlucky to catch something serious."

The country's healthcare system has seen improvements since the 2000's, with a steady rise to healthcare access, particularly to women and children, being reported by the World Health Organization (WHO) in 2016.

In 2020 the construction of a new central Pyongyang hospital started, the Pyongyang General Hospital, in front of the Monument to Party Founding. This is part of a programme of healthcare system improvement. Using the experience of building Pyongyang General Hospital, the construction of three pilot local hospitals was announced: Kangdong County Hospital , Kusong City Hospital and Ryonggang County Hospital. 2025 was designated "First Year of the Health Revolution" with a campaign to construct modern hospitals nationwide.

In 2022, state-run "Standard Pharmacies" began to be established, and were available in all cities and counties by 2024. These pharmacies charge patients for medicines.

In 2025, the Ministry of Health launched a smartphone app providing a drug and medical product ordering and delivery service, a common medical problems query and answer system, and a facility for online consultations with medical practitioners. The drug database is for over 3,000 pharmaceuticals, traditional medicines and medical goods, including information on associated medical conditions, and can be consulted when offline.

== Health status ==
Development of life expectancy in North Korea and South Korea

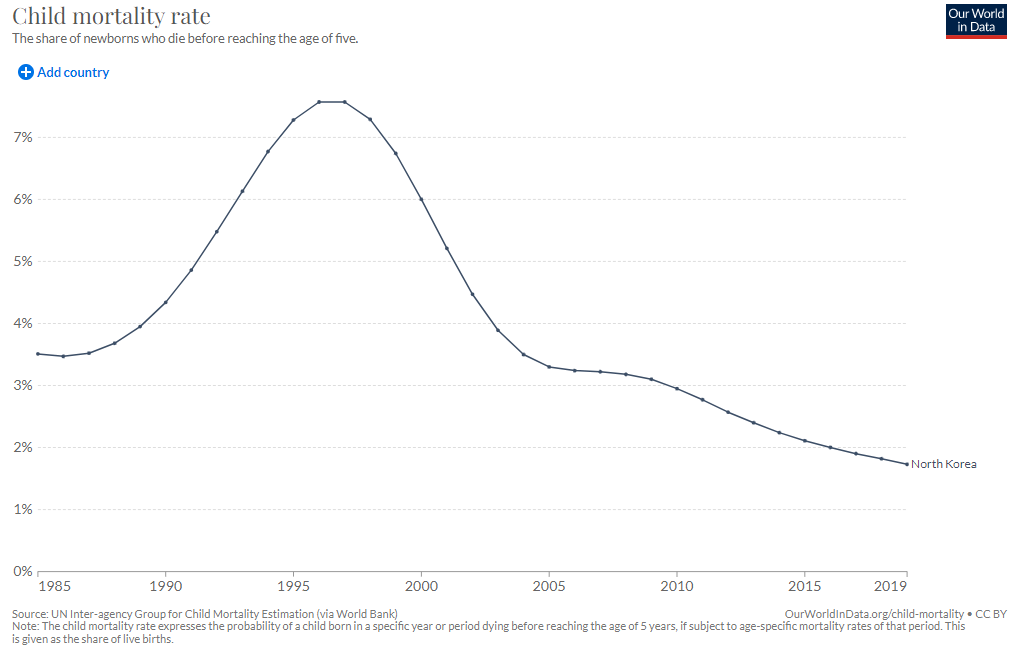
Development of child mortality in North Korea since 1960

In 2010, Amnesty International and the World Health Organization made wildly varying claims on the state of the North Korean healthcare system. Amnesty International, citing interviews with 40 North Korean defectors and foreign healthcare workers, explained the North Korean healthcare system as one with "barely functioning hospitals." It described hospitals that operate without heating or electricity and shortages of medicines and medical equipment. It also challenged the claims that healthcare was free, claiming that according to interviews with defectors healthcare, had not been free since the 1990s. The World Health Organization (WHO) criticized the Amnesty International report as outdated and factually inaccurate, describing the healthcare system as "the envy of the developing world" while acknowledging that "challenges remained, including poor infrastructure, a lack of equipment, malnutrition and a shortage of medicines." The World Health Organization claimed that the report was based on a small sample of people who had left North Korea, some as far back as 2001, and did not reflect present conditions, particularly after recent improvements in the system due to a program funded by South Korea and aided by the WHO. Commenting on the reports, a BBC reporter said that UN agencies with aid projects in North Korea are typically reluctant to openly criticize the country for fear of jeopardizing their work there. Special health care is available mainly in cities, where pharmacies are also common. Essential medicines are also well available. There are hospitals attached to factories and mines.

In a 2020 article, a North Korean defector who left the country in 2018 claimed that the healthcare system in North Korea caters to the upper classes, who get free care in the country's best medical facilities, while everyone else must pay for care in substandard hospitals. According to him, healthcare coverage was better during the reign of Kim Il Sung, with free hospital treatment available in the 1970s and 1980s, but patients must now pay doctors for their services and must also pay for the medicine and medical equipment used to treat them due to shortages, writing that "average North Koreans see their lives as left to fate. They no longer expect anything from the government in terms of health care." He described hospitals lacking electricity and heating, doctors conducting surgeries by battery-powered flashlights, and wealthier patients paying for firewood or using self-made heaters by burning wood inside steel plates or a drum to heat their rooms. He claimed that it was not unusual for patients to endure surgery without anesthetic to save money. Describing a personal case where he and his wife needed surgery, he claimed that they had to buy "everything from cotton and dressing to anesthetic (novocaine) and antibiotics (penicillin)", pay the surgeon, and treat the rest of the staff to a meal at a privately-run restaurant. He wrote that "How much money a patient has determines whether they live or die." Commenting on accessibility, he claimed that "only the top 1 percent actually enjoys free healthcare. Maybe 20% can afford to pay a doctor. The rest wouldn't even dare to think of going to visit a doctor."

A study based on interviews with respondent-driven sampled defectors living in South Korea found that 65.4% of respondents paid out-of-pocket for medicines, 82% had paid for medical supplies and 75.9% paid for other items such as "meals or heating when in health facilities."

A 2013 study stated that the largest obstacle to understanding the accurate health status of North Korea is the lack of validity and reliability of its health data.

=== Life expectancy ===
North Korea has a life expectancy of 73.98 years (as of 2026). The 2009 gender breakdown was 72.8 years of life expectancy for females and 64.9 for males.

Period	Life expectancy at	Period	Life expectancy in Years	Period	Life expectancy in Years
1950–1955	37.6	1985–1990	68.6	2020–2025	73.45
1955–1960	49.9	1990–1995	70.0	2025–2026	73.92
1960–1965	51.6	1995–2000	63.5		
1965–1970	57.2	2000–2005	68.1		
1970–1975	61.7	2005–2010	68.4		
1975–1980	65.0	2010–2015	70.8		
1980–1985	67.1	2015–2020	72.96		

Source: UN World Population Prospects

=== Malnutrition ===
During the 1990s, North Korea was ravaged by famine, causing the death of between 500,000 and 3,000,000 people. Food shortages were persistent, with factors such as bad weather; lack of fertiliser; and a drop in international donation, particularly caused by the Dissolution of the Soviet Union, meaning that North Koreans often did not have enough to eat. A study of North Koreans in 2008 found that three-quarters of respondents had reduced their food intake. Extreme poverty is also a factor in the hunger faced by North Korean people, with 27% of the population living at or below the absolute poverty line of less than US$1 a day.

These food shortages cause a number of malnutrition diseases. A 2009 UNICEF report found that North Korea was "one of 18 countries with the highest prevalence of stunting (moderate and severe) among children under 5 years old". A survey in 2017 found that less than 20% of North Korean children were stunted, a decrease from 32% in 2009. While the DPRK has recovered from the precarious situation in the late 20th century, the country still faces challenges in remediating food insecurity. Under the tenure of Kim Jong Un, several institutional and economic reforms have been made to address food security as well as agricultural productivity.

=== Sanitation ===
A survey conducted in 2017 found that most people had access to a toilet, but that 93% of sanitation facilities were not connected to a sewage system. Rather, the human waste was used as fertilizer on fields, creating the potential health risk of spreading intestinal worms. The survey also found that a quarter of people ingested contaminated drinking water.

=== Ophthalmology ===
In 2006, Professor Gerd Auffarth of Heidelberg University Eye Hospital in Germany was permitted to visit the country. He is one of the few Western surgeons to have carried out eye surgery in North Korea. Before he arrived in Pyongyang, he was authorized to do just five surgeries but once he reached the University Hospital, he found that he could do seventeen: one perforating keratoplasty using donor tissue he had brought from Germany, three scleral-fixated secondary IOL implantations, and thirteen phacoemulsification procedures with IOL implants. All the procedures were conducted with topical anesthesia which had been brought with him from Germany. He reported on his experiences in 2011 in a video entitled, Ophthalmology Behind the Iron Curtain: Cataract Surgery in North Korea, saying that the economic conditions have led to improvisations – especially because of the absence of consumable medical devices but he commented that once a visiting surgeon adapts to these unique surroundings, he found that teaching and clinical work could be very effective and satisfying for both surgeon and patient. As a consequence of this visit, in 2007 two young North Korean ophthalmic surgeons were permitted to visit Heidelberg and remain for six months, gaining extensive training in cataract surgery.

Another foreign ophthalmologist to visit North Korea to do surgery is Sanduk Ruit from Nepal. The Nepalese Tilganga Institute of Ophthalmology trains North Korean practitioners of ophthalmology.

=== Non-communicable diseases ===
Non-communicable diseases (NCD) risk factors in North Korea include high rates of urbanization, an aging society, and high rates of smoking and alcohol consumption amongst men.

Cardiovascular disease as a single disease group is the largest cause of death in North Korea (2013). The three major causes of death in DPR Korea are ischaemic heart disease (13%), lower respiratory infections (11%) and cerebrovascular disease (7%).

Approximately 54.8% of all North Korean adult males smoke an average of fifteen cigarettes per day. Smoking prevalence is slightly higher amongst the urban worker population than the farming population. Amongst men, a high rate of excessive alcohol consumption has been reported, defined by the World Health Organization as consumption of more than one bottle, per sitting, per person (26.3% of males).

The North Korean government has prioritized the prevention of NCDs in their National Strategic Plan for the Prevention and Control of Noncommunicable Diseases 2014-2020 and in 2005 ratified the WHO Framework Convention on Tobacco Control. As of 2022, it prioritized the prevention of diabetes.

=== Oral health ===
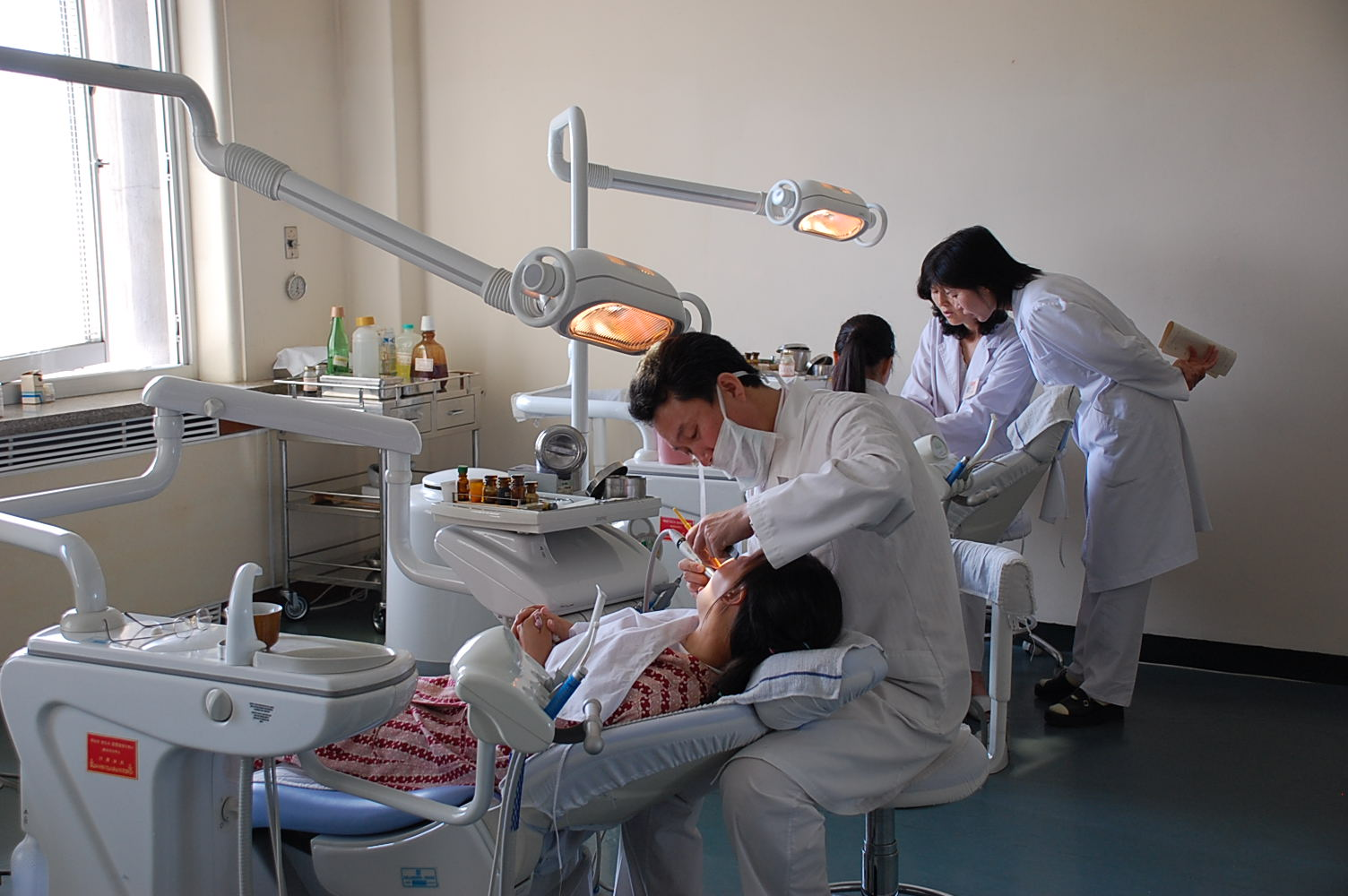
A dental clinic at Pyongyang Maternity Hospital

In the past, North Koreans had few problems with dental health because their diet included little sugar. Since the 2000s, sugar has been introduced to diets in the form of confectionery and sweet snacks, especially in urban areas. Toothpaste is not regularly used.

=== Infectious diseases ===
In 2003, infectious diseases, such as tuberculosis, malaria, and hepatitis B, were described as endemic to North Korea. An estimated 4.5% of North Koreans had hepatitis B in 2003.

In 2009, the flu pandemic in Asia affected the country.

In 2010, Amnesty International reported that North Korea was experiencing a tuberculosis epidemic, with 5% of the population infected with the disease. It attributed this to the "overall deterioration in health and nutrition status of the population as well as the rundown of the public health services".

In 2010, infections that cause pneumonia and diarrhea were reported to be the leading causes of child death. In 2009, one-third of the school-age children in North Korea were assessed as having diseases caused by intestinal parasites.

==== Coronavirus outbreak ====
In 2020, North Korea was one of the first countries to close borders and take other measures due to the COVID-19 pandemic. On 12 May 2022, North Korea announced its first case. A 2024 article in 38 North by U.S. health academics stated that North Korea had had a "seemingly successful response to COVID-19".

The Coronavirus pandemic also lead North Korea to step up on its domestic medical supplies and appliances production, including medical oxygen.

==== HIV/AIDS ====
The DPRK government has always maintained that North Korea is completely free of AIDS. According to UNAIDS, less than 0.2% of North Korea's adult population were HIV-positive in 2006. In 2018, WHO's North Korean office said there were no reported HIV positive cases in the country.

A study in 2002 found both men and women were reasonably educated about HIV/AIDS. More than two-thirds knew about ways to avoid HIV/AIDS, and there were only few misconceptions about the disease. However, according to the UN Population Fund in 2001, even hospital staff occasionally had limited awareness. Travel across the border to China has been seen as a risk factor.

In 2011, North Korea spent $1,000,000 on HIV prevention, with similar figures for previous years. The same year, North Korea received $75,000 of international aid for combatting HIV/AIDS. There are testing points and clinics, but no antiretroviral therapy was reportedly available in 2006.

North Korea has punitive laws concerning certain populations at risk of HIV/AIDS. According to UNAIDS, such laws can stigmatize those affected by HIV/AIDS and hinder their treatment. North Korea criminalizes the sex trade. Some drug-related crimes are capital offenses. On the other hand, drug users are not subjected to compulsory detention. Same-sex relations between consenting adult males are not illegal. North Korea deports visitors upon discovery of HIV-positive status.

In 2019, American journal Science has reported the country has higher numbers of HIV than expected, with a total number of 8,362 people with HIV in the country.

== Traditional Korean medicine ==
According to the Korean Medical Association, more than 80 percent of primary care in North Korea relies on traditional Korean medicine. The association suggests the promotion of traditional medicine is the result of poor pharmaceutical production. North Korean law both requires and emphasizes that Western medicine must be combined with traditional Korean medicine. Article 31 of the North Korean Medical Law stipulates that medical institutions must use acupuncture and traditional Korean medicine to treat patients. Other aspects of the law also emphasize developing both traditional and modern medicine, which is reflected in most North Korean medical journals. In 2025, the construction of certified Koryo (traditional) medicine factories was emphasised.

== See also ==
- Disability in North Korea
- Basic Medicine
