= Education in North Korea =

Education in the Democratic People's Republic of Korea

General details
- Primary languages: Korean
- System type: State

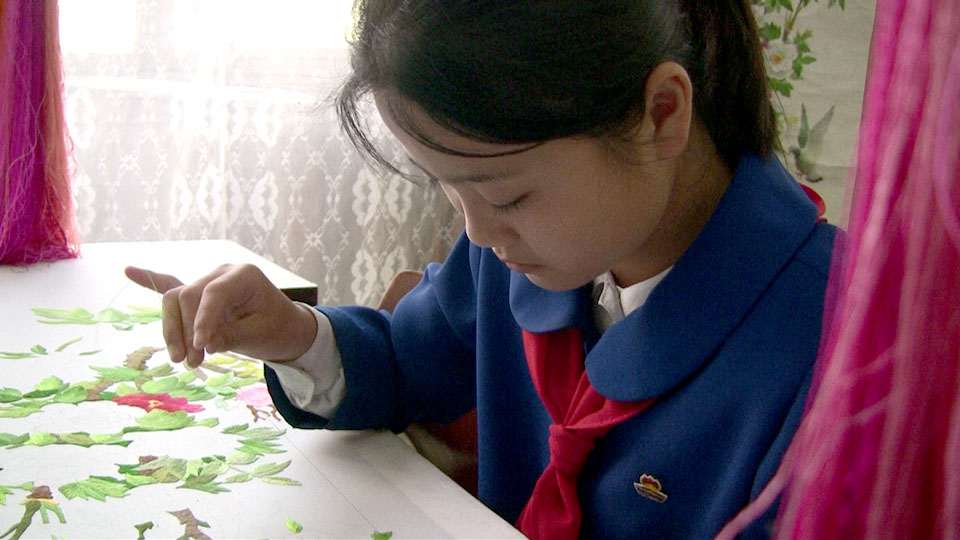
Mangyondae Schoolchildrens Palace in Pyongyang

Education in North Korea is universal and state-funded schooling by the government. As of 2021, UNESCO Institute for Statistics does not report any data for North Korea's literacy rates. Children in the DPRK go through one year of kindergarten, five years of primary education, and six years of secondary education, after which it is possible to attend university or technical college.

In 1988, the United Nations Educational, Scientific, and Cultural Organization (UNESCO) reported that the number of teachers North Korea had was 35,000 in preprimary, 60,000 in primary, 111,000 in secondary, 23,000 in college and university, and 4,000 in other postsecondary.

== History ==
=== Historical Korea ===
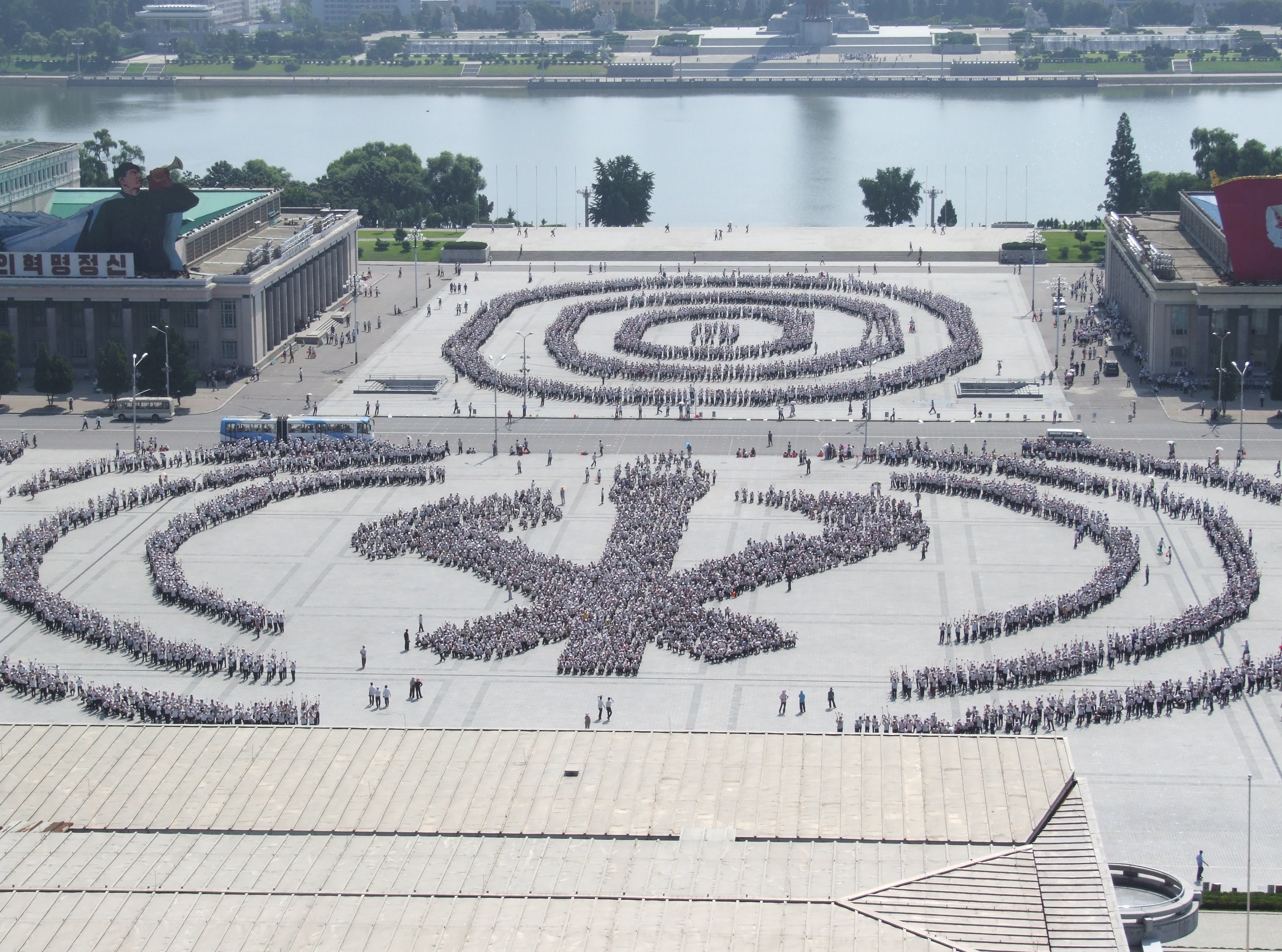
Children make the emblem of the Workers' Party of Korea as they practice for a torch march on Kim Il Sung Square in Pyongyang, 2012.

Formal education has played a central role in the social and cultural development of both traditional Korea and contemporary North Korea. During the Joseon Dynasty, the royal court established a system of schools that taught Confucian subjects in the provinces as well as in four central secondary schools in the capital. There was no state-supported system of primary education.

During the 15th century, state-supported schools declined in quality and were supplanted in importance by private academies, the seowon, centers of a Neo-Confucian revival in the 16th century. Higher education was provided by the Seonggyungwan, the Confucian national university, in Seoul. Its enrollment was limited to 200 students who had passed the lower civil-service examinations and were preparing for the highest examinations.

The late 19th and early 20th centuries saw major educational changes. The seowon were abolished by the central government. Christian missionaries established modern schools that taught Western curricula. Among them was the first school for women, Ewha Woman's University, established by American Methodist missionaries as a primary school in Seoul in 1886. During the last years of the dynasty, as many as 3,000 private schools that taught modern subjects to both sexes were founded by missionaries and others.

After Japan annexed Korea in 1910, the colonial regime established an educational system with two goals: to give Koreans a minimal education designed to train them for roles in a modern economy and make them loyal subjects of the Japanese emperor; and to provide a higher quality education for Japanese expatriates who had settled in large numbers on the Korean Peninsula.

The Japanese invested more resources in the latter, and opportunities for Koreans were severely limited. A state university modeled on Tokyo Imperial University was established in Seoul in 1923, but the number of Koreans allowed to study there never exceeded 40 percent of its enrollment; the rest of its students were Japanese. Private universities, including those established by missionaries such as Sungsil College in Pyongyang and Chosun Christian College in Seoul, provided other opportunities for Koreans desiring higher education.

=== Democratic People's Republic of Korea ===
After the establishment of North Korea, an education system modeled largely on that of the Soviet Union was established. According to North Korean sources, at the time of North Korea's establishment, two-thirds of school-age children did not attend primary school, and most adults, numbering 2.3 million, were illiterate. In 1950, primary education became compulsory for children. The outbreak of the Korean War, however, delayed attainment of this goal; universal primary education was not achieved until 1956. By 1958 North Korean sources claimed that seven-year compulsory primary and secondary education had been implemented.

In the 1950s, owing to the destruction of schools in the DPRK during the Korean War, thousands of DPRK elementary school, high school, and university students were sent to study in Eastern Bloc nations in Europe. After the Hungarian Revolution of 1956, the DPRK government repatriated all students, but continued sending students to the USSR.

In 1959, "state-financed universal education" was introduced in all schools, in which instruction, educational facilities, textbooks, uniforms, and room and board are provided to students without charge. By 1967, nine years of education became compulsory. In 1975, the compulsory eleven-year education system, which includes one year of preschool education and ten years of primary and secondary education, was implemented. According to a 1983 speech given by Kim Il Sung to education ministers of Non-Aligned Movement countries in Pyongyang, universal, compulsory higher education was to be introduced "in the near future." At that time, students had no school expenses; the state paid for the education of almost half of at the time North Korea's population of 18.9 million.

In 2012, leader Kim Jong Un advocated that North Korea should expand its compulsory education from 11 years to 12 years. According to the state Korean Central News Agency, a bill to expand its compulsory education was passed in September 2012. Prior to this reform, North Korea had eleven years of free education system which consisted of one year of kindergarten, four years of elementary school and six years of secondary school prior to college. After reform, the system compromises one year of kindergarten, five years of primary school, three years of lower secondary school, and three years of upper secondary school now, it resembles education system in South Korea and China.

== Primary and secondary education ==
In the mid-1980s, there were 9,530 primary and secondary schools. After graduating from people's school, students enter either a regular secondary school or a special secondary school that concentrates on music, art, or foreign languages. These schools teach both their specialties and general subjects. The Mangyongdae Revolutionary Institute where the children of the North Korean elite are prepared for service as officers in the Korean People's Army is an important special school where modern training in economics and computers is stressed as is the Kang Pan-sok Revolutionary School.

In the early 1990s, the compulsory primary and secondary education system was divided into one year of kindergarten, four years of primary school (people's school) for ages six to nine, and six years of senior middle school (secondary school) for ages ten to fifteen. There are two years of kindergarten, for children aged four to six, only the second year (upper level kindergarten) is compulsory.

In senior middle schools, politically oriented subjects, including the "Great Kim Il-sung" and "Communist Morality" as well as "Communist Party Policy," comprise 5.8 percent of instruction.

== Social education ==
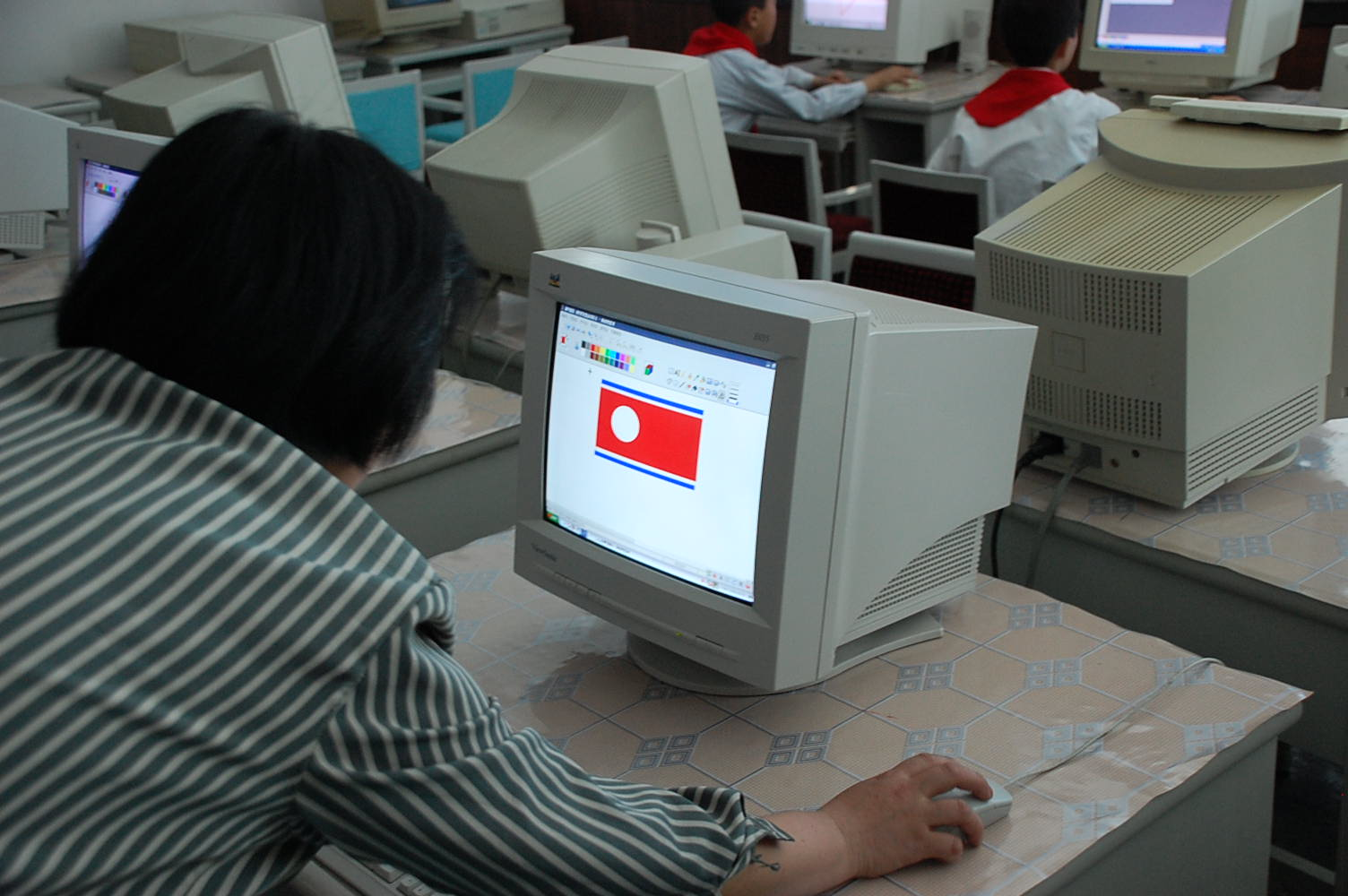
A computer class at a school. The computer shown here is running Red Star OS Version 1.0./Beta

Outside the formal structure of schools and classrooms is "social education." This education includes extracurricular activities, family life, and the range of human relationships in North Korean society. Attention is paid to the influence of the social environment on the growing child and its role in the development of his or her character.

The idea of social education is to provide a carefully controlled environment in which children are insulated from unplanned influences. According to a North Korean official interviewed in 1990, "School education is not enough to turn the rising generation into men of knowledge, virtue, and physical fitness. After school, our children have many spare hours. So it's important to efficiently organize their afterschool education."

In his 1977 Theses on Socialist Education, Kim Il Sung described the components of social education. In the Korean Children's Union and the Socialist Patriotic Youth League, young people learn the nature of collective and organizational life in North Korea. Some prepare for membership in the Korean Workers' Party. In students' and schoolchildren's halls and palaces, managed by the youth league central committee, young people participate in many extracurricular activities after school.

There are cultural facilities such as libraries and museums, monuments and historical sites of the Korean revolution, and mass media dedicated to serving the goals of social education. Large facilities called "schoolchildren's palaces", have been built in Pyongyang, Mangyongdae, and other sites. The palaces provide political lectures and seminars, debating contests, poetry recitals, and scientific forums. They also include their own gymnasiums and theaters. The Students' and Children's Palace in Pyongyang attracted some 10,000 children daily in the early 1990s.

North Korea compares its system of education to the ideal standards espoused by international guidelines such as the International Covenant on Civil and Political Rights (ICCPR) and the Convention on the Rights of the Child (CRC).

== Higher education ==
Institutions of higher education include colleges and universities; teachers' training colleges, with a four-year course for preparing kindergarten, primary, and secondary instructors; colleges of advanced technology with two or three-year courses; medical schools with six-year courses; special colleges for science and engineering, art, music, and foreign languages; and military colleges and academies. Kim Il Sung's report to the Sixth Party Congress of the Workers' Party of Korea in October 1980 revealed that there were 170 "higher learning institutions" and 480 "higher specialized schools" that year.

In 1987 there were 220,000 students attending two- or three-year higher specialized schools and 301,000 students attending four- to six-year colleges and university courses. According to Eberstadt and Banister, 13.7 percent of the population sixteen years of age or older was attending, or had graduated from, institutions of higher education in 1987–88. In 1988 the regime surpassed its target of producing "an army of 1.3 million intellectuals," graduates of higher education, a major step in the direction of achieving the often-stated goal of "intellectualization of the whole society."

=== Universities ===
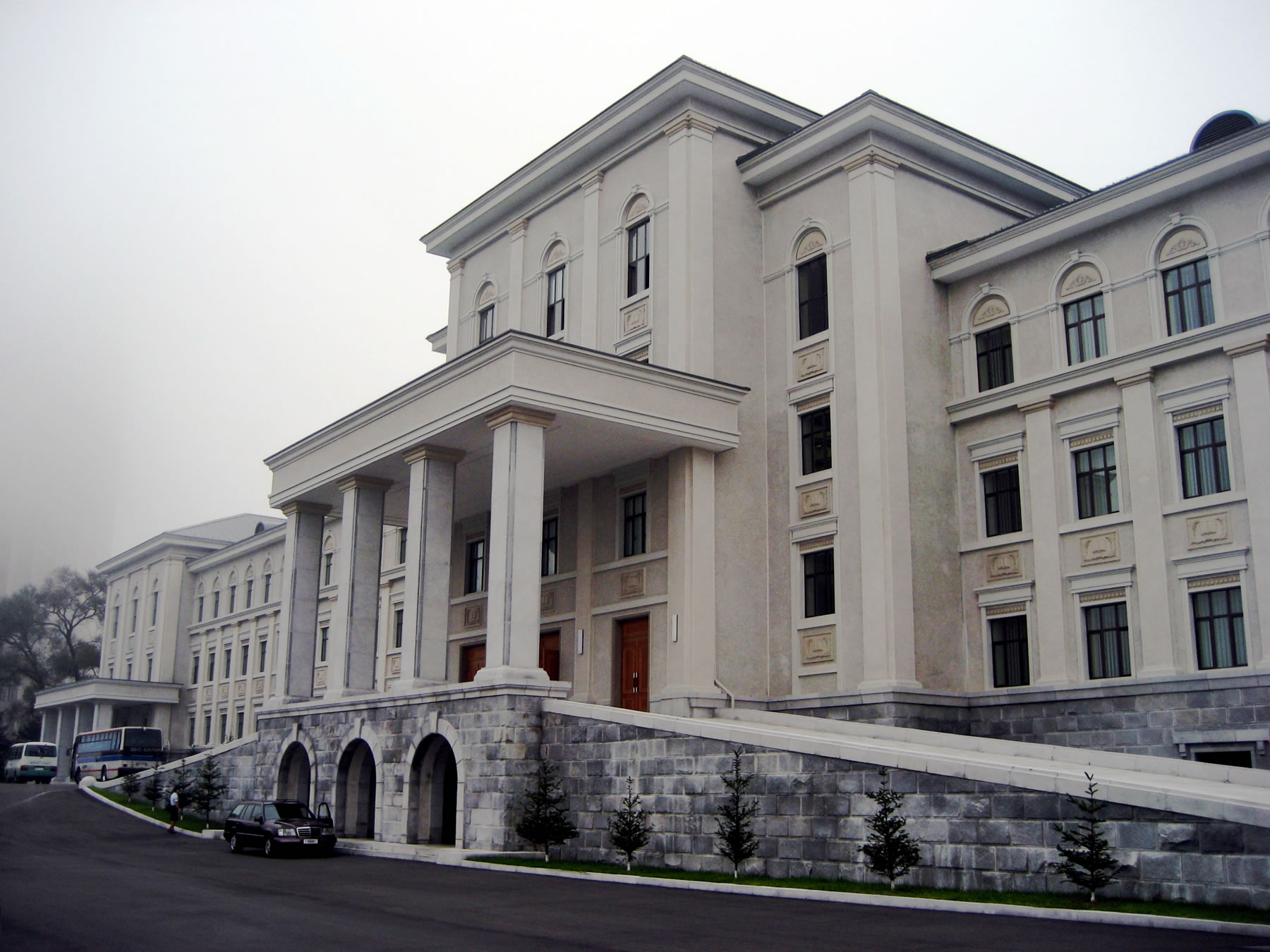
Kim Il Sung University

Kim Il Sung University, founded in October 1946, is the country's only comprehensive institution of higher education offering bachelor's, master's, and doctoral degrees. Its enrollment of 16,000 full- and part-time students in the early 1990s occupies, in the words of one observer, the "pinnacle of the North Korean educational and social system." Competition for admission is intense.

According to a Korean-American scholar who visited the university in the early 1980s, only one student is admitted out of every five or six applicants. An important criterion for admission is senior middle school grades, although political criteria are also major factors in selection. A person wishing to gain acceptance to any institution of higher education has to be nominated by the local "college recommendation committee" before approval by county- and provincial-level committees.

Kim Il Sung University's colleges and faculties include economics, history, philosophy, law, foreign languages and literature, geography, physics, mathematics, chemistry, nuclear power, biology, and computer science. There are about 3,000 faculty members, including teaching and research staff. All facilities are located on a modern, high-rise campus in the northern part of Pyongyang.

Other notable universities include Kim Chaek University of Technology and the University of Natural Science, which focuses on computer science and natural science related to mass nuclear research. Pyongyang University of Foreign Studies, trains working level diplomats and trade officials, and Kim Hyong Jik University of Education trains teachers.

Choson Exchange, a non-profit organization founded by Harvard, Yale, Wharton School and Singaporean graduate students, also runs consulting and training programs in finance, business and economics with Kim Il Sung-university and the State Development Bank in North Korea. Their programs target North Koreans under the age of 40 and combine OpenCourseWare materials and on-site lectures to deliver year-round training.

Pyongyang University of Science and Technology (PUST), which opened in 2010, is the country's only privately funded university. It is a joint venture institute of higher learning, founded, funded and operated by mostly Evangelical Christians from South Korea, China, and the United States. In recent years there have been more Europeans due to a US travel ban. The purpose of the university is to provide quality education with an international perspective. All teaching staff are foreign professors who teach in English, other than specific German and Chinese language classes. In 2019 it had 638 enrolled undergraduate and postgraduate students.

In addition, the Pyongyang Business School (평양국제경영학교) offers short courses given by foreign lecturers. It was founded by the Swiss government and helps teach students business management. Another economic educational institution is the Centre for the Study of the Capitalist System, established in 2000.

In July 2011, all universities in North Korea were closed after the Arab Spring caused the government to become concerned about the possibility of a similar popular uprising in North Korea.

The remote universities obtained media attention while encrypting lesson plans and communicating them by a method of a radio broadcasting in 2016.

==== Medical school ====
As of 2018, there were 11 medical schools in North Korea, including 10 private medical universities and 1 military medical university. Medical education is conducted over the course of six years following high school and consists of both conventional medicine and traditional Korean medicine.

== International students ==
Prior to the COVID-19 pandemic, there were estimated to be about 100 foreign students at Kim Il Sung University and 100 at the Kim Hyong Jik University of Education, the majority of whom were Chinese.

Compared to foreign tourists, international students in North Korea, while still under state control, are granted opportunities allowing them to experience the country more comprehensively, such as freedom of movement within the city without being accompanied by minders, and the chance to live alongside local students. Unlike foreign tourists, international students are permitted to take the subway and taxis without guides or interpreters and are able to use the internet, providing they have access to foreign web sites.

International students at Kim Il Sung University live alongside specially trained and vetted local students called tongsuksaeng, who are ostensibly there to act as hosts and to teach the Korean language and culture. These individuals are tasked with spying on the international students by going through their belongings and tracking their movements.

Foreign students seeking to undertake postgraduate studies at Kim Il Sung University are required to provide their birth certificate, a letter of intent, their undergraduate certificate(s), a police certificate stating that the applicant does not have a criminal record in their home country, medical records certifying the applicant had a recent health examination, details of their financial background to show how they will be financing their education in North Korea, as well as a letter vouching for the applicant's Korean language ability.

== Adult education ==
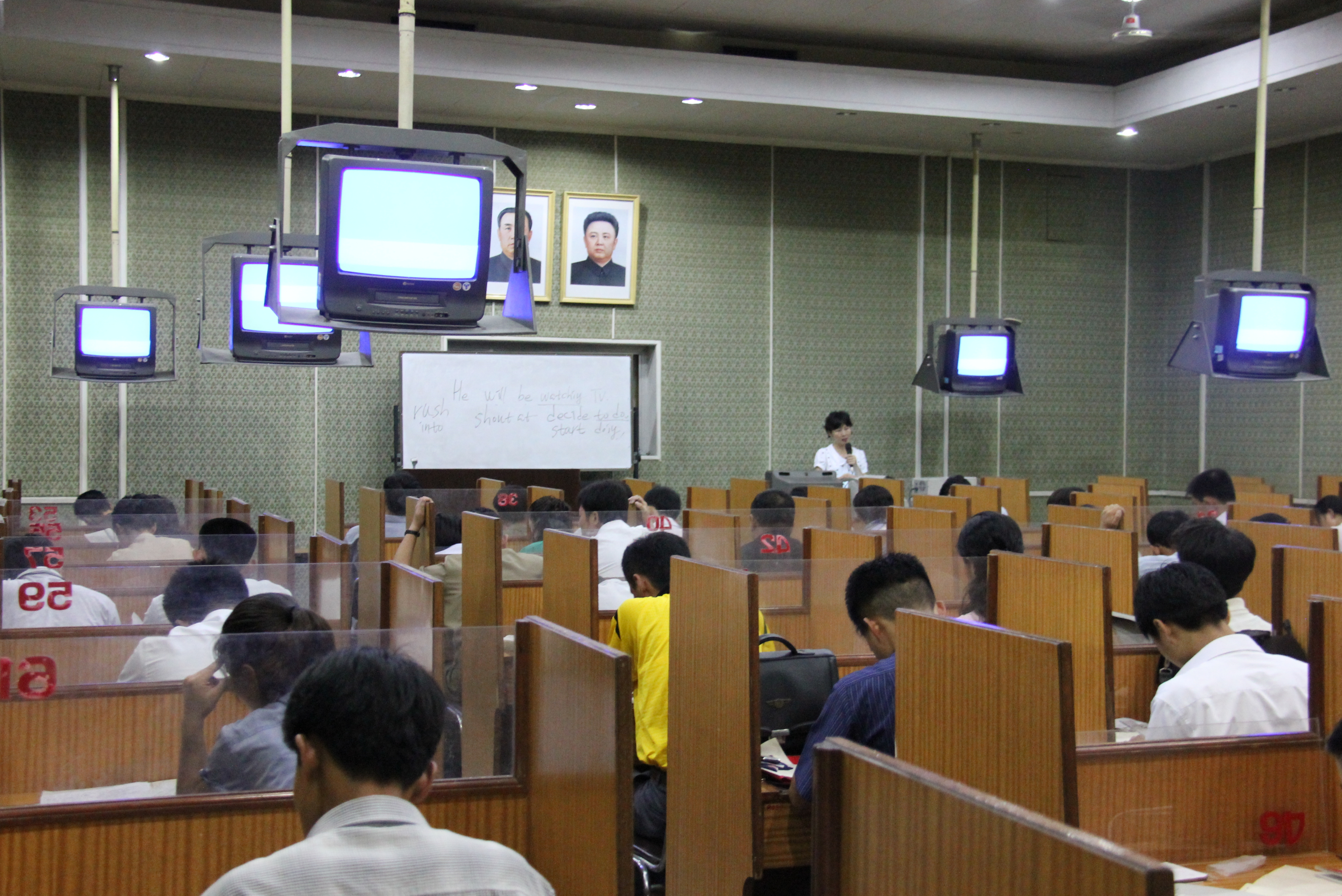
English lecture at the Grand People's Study House in Pyongyang

Because of the emphasis on the continued education of all members of society, adult or work-study education is actively supported. Practically everyone in the country participates in some educational activity, usually in the form of "small study groups."

In the early 1990s, people in rural areas were organized into "five-family teams." These teams have educational and surveillance functions; the teams are the responsibility of a schoolteacher or other intellectual, each one being in charge of several such teams. Office and factory workers have two-hour "study sessions" after work each day on both political and technical subjects.

Adult education institutions in the early 1990s included "factory colleges", which teach workers new skills and techniques without forcing them to quit their jobs. Students work part-time, study in the evening, or take short intensive courses, leaving their workplaces for only a month or so. There are also "farm colleges", where rural workers can study to become engineers and assistant engineers, and a system of correspondence courses. For workers and peasants who are unable to receive regular school education, there are "laborers' schools" and "laborers' senior middle schools," although in the early 1990s these had become less important with the introduction of compulsory eleven-year education.

== See also ==
- Pyongyang Foreigners School
- Membership Training in Korea
- Basic Medicine
