= Choe Kyong-chol =

North Korean politician

Minister of Health of North Korea
- Incumbent
- Assumed office 17 January 2021
- President: Kim Jong Un

Personal details
- Born: North Korea
- Political party: Workers' Party of Korea

Korean name
- Hangul: 최경철
- RR: Choe Gyeongcheol
- MR: Ch'oe Kyŏngch'ŏl

Choe Kyong-chol (Korean: 최경철) is a North Korean politician. He is a candidate (alternate) member of the Central Committee of the Workers' Party of Korea and Minister of Health in the North Korean cabinet. He has served as vice president of the Pyongyang Medical University.

== Biography ==
He is the vice president of the Pyongyang Medical University. At the 4th Plenary Meeting of the 7th Central Committee of the Workers' Party of Korea held on April 10, 2019, he was elected as a member of the Central Committee of the Workers' Party of Korea, and was elected as a candidate (alternate) member of the 8th Central Committee during the 8th Congress, which was held from January 5, 2021. He was appointed Minister of Health at the 4th Session of the 14th Supreme People's Assembly held on January 17 of the same year He has overseen large portions of the COVID-19 pandemic in North Korea, in which the government has claimed great success. He led the Ministry of Health Workers and Worker-Peasant Red Guards Column at the military parade to celebrate the 73rd anniversary of the founding of the country on September 9, 2021. In November 2022 he gave the opening speech in the National Science and Technology Presentation and Exhibition-2022.
