= 8th Central Auditing Commission of the Workers' Party of Korea =

The 8th Central Auditing Commission of the Workers' Party of Korea (Korean: 제8기 조선로동당 중앙감사위원회) was elected at the party's 8th Congress on 10 January 2021. It is composed of one chairman, two vice chairmen, and twelve ordinary members.

== Leadership ==
- Chairman:
  - Jong Sang-hak, until 8 June 2022
  - Kim Jae-ryong, 8 June 2022 – 24 December 2024
  - Ri Hi-yong, from 24 December 2024
- Vice Chairmen:
  - Pak Thae-dok, until 28 December 2022
  - Ri Hi-yong, until 2024
  - Kim Sang-gon, 28 December 2022 – 24 December 2024
  - Kim Jae-ryong, from 24 December 2024
  - Kim Hyong-sik, from 24 December 2024

== Members ==
The following were elected as members of the 8th Central Auditing Commission.

The names of members are listed according to the order of their election at the 1st plenary meeting of the 8th Central Committee. Members who have an en dash (—) in the Rank column were by-elected during the term of the 8th Central Committee.

Rank	Name	Korean	7th CAC (Note: Status in the 7th Central Auditing Commission at the end of its term.)	7th COC (Note: Status in the Control Commission at the end of the 7th Central Committee's term.)	9th CAC (Note: Status in the 9th Central Auditing Commission at the start of its term.)
1	Jong Sang-hak	정상학	No	No	No
2	Pak Thae-dok	박태덕	No	No	No
3	Ri Hi-yong	리히용	No	No	Yes
4	Ri Kyong-chol	리경철	No	No	No
5	Pak Kwang-sik	박광식	No	No	Yes
6	Pak Kwang-ung	박광웅	No	No	Yes
7	Jon Thae-su	전태수	No	No	Yes
8	Jong In-chol	정인철	No	No	Yes
9	Kim Song-chol	김성철	No	No	No
10	Jang Ki-ho	장기호	No	No	No
11	Kang Yun-sok	강윤석	No	No	No
12	U Sang-chol	우상철	No	No	No
13	Jang Kwang-bong	장광봉	No	No	No
14	Kim Kwang-chol	김광철	No	Yes	No
15	O Tong-il	오동일	No	No	Yes
—	Kim Jae-ryong (Note: Kim Jae-ryong was by-elected as a member on 8 June 2022.)	김재룡	No	No	No
—	Kim In-chol (Note: Kim In-chol was by-elected as a member on 8 June 2022.)	김인철	No	No	No
—	Kim Sang-gon (Note: Kim Sang-gon was by-elected as a member on 28 December 2022.)	김상건	No	No	No
—	Choe Kun-yong (Note: Choe Kun-yong was by-elected as a member on 18 June 2023.)	최근영	No	No	Yes
—	Kim Hyong-sik (Note: Kim Hyong-sik was by-elected as a member on 24 December 2024.)	김형식	No	No	No
—	Kang Myong-chol (Note: Kang Myong-chol was by-elected as a member on 24 December 2024.)	강명철	No	No	Yes
