= 9th Central Auditing Commission of the Workers' Party of Korea =

The 9th Central Auditing Commission of the Workers' Party of Korea (Korean: 제9기 조선로동당 중앙감사위원회) was elected on 23 February 2026 by the 1st Plenary Session of the 9th Central Committee.

== Leadership ==
- Chairman: Ri Hi-yong
- Vice Chairmen:
  - Pak Kwang-ung;
  - Kim Chol-sam;

== Members ==
The following were elected as members of the 9th Central Auditing Commission.

The names of members are listed according to the order of their election at the 1st plenary meeting of the 9th Central Committee.

Rank	Name	Korean	8th (Note: Status in the 8th Central Auditing Commission at the end of its term.)
1	Ri Hi-yong	리히용	Yes
2	Pak Kwang-ung	박광웅	Yes
3	Kim Chol-sam	김철삼	No
4	Choe Jun-ho	최준호	No
5	Pak Kwang-sik	박광식	Yes
6	Jon Thae-su	전태수	Yes
7	Jong In-chol	정인철	Yes
8	Ri Song-chol	리성철	No
9	Jo Jong-chol	조정철	No
10	Pak Jin-myong	박진명	No
11	Kim Chol-won	김철원	No
12	Choe Kun-yong	최근영	Yes
13	Pae Song-chol	배성철	No
14	Kang Myong-chol	강명철	Yes
15	O Tong-il	오동일	Yes
