= 2003 North Korean parliamentary election =

- 3 August 2003

All 687 seats in the Supreme People's Assembly
- Turnout: 99.9%
Party	Seats	+/–
Fatherland Front	687	0
This lists parties that won seats. See the complete results below.
NDC Chairman before	NDC Chairman after
Kim Jong Il; Workers' Party	Kim Jong Il; Workers' Party

Parliamentary elections were held in North Korea on 3 August 2003. Representatives were elected for five-year terms to all 687 seats of the Supreme People's Assembly, and also to 26,650 positions in city, county, and provincial People's Assemblies. All candidates were members of the three parties constituting the Democratic Front for the Reunification of the Fatherland.

Most polling booths featured posters saying: "Let's participate in the voting for deputies to the People's Assembly and give our support to them!". There was a 99.9% turnout for the election with each candidate receiving 100% of the vote unopposed. In its first session, on 3 September, the newly elected parliament re-elected Kim Jong Il as the Chairman of the National Defence Commission.

== Significance of the number 649 in North Korean politics ==
Kim Jong Il's seat was the 649th seat, and in North Korea, political meanings are imparted to numbers of the constituencies for cult of personality purposes. According to North Korean sources, multiplying 6, 4 and 9 gives the number 216, which coincides with Kim Jong Il's birthday, 16 February, and 4 times 9 plus 6 gives the number 42, which coincides with Kim Jong Il's official birth year, 1942.

== Results ==
Alliance	Votes	%	Seats
Democratic Front for the Reunification of Korea		100	687
Total			687
Registered voters/turnout		99.9	
Source: IPU

=== Elected members ===
The following were elected as members of parliament:

1. Electoral District: Ri Ul-sol
2. Electoral District: Ryu Mi-yong
3. Electoral District: Kim Kyong-hui
4. Electoral District: Kim Bok-nam
5. Electoral District: Kang Jun-ho
6. Electoral District: Kim Yong-nam
7. Electoral District: Kim Yong-bok
8. Electoral District: Ryu Chung-ryol
9. Electoral District: Jang Song-thaek
10. Electoral District: Ri Je-kang
11. Electoral District: Hong So-hon
12. Electoral District: Ri Sun-im
13. Electoral District: Sin Song-bo
14. Electoral District: Yu Il-ung
15. Electoral District: O I-jong
16. Electoral District: Kim Jong-ho
17. Electoral District: Ri Kyong-il
18. Electoral District: Yun Sok-chon
19. Electoral District: Chon Kyong-su
20. Electoral District: Hwang Kil-chol
21. Electoral District: Choe Chang-ae
22. Electoral District: Kim Hi-thaek
23. Electoral District: Pae Yong-kyu
24. Electoral District: Kwak Sang-sik
25. Electoral District: Kim Song-hi
26. Electoral District: Ho Jong-suk
27. Electoral District: Cho Myong-rok
28. Electoral District: Ri Un-kuk
29. Electoral District: Ri Myong-ok
30. Electoral District: Kang Sok-chu
31. Electoral District: Omsung Kun
32. Electoral District: Ryang Man-kil
33. Electoral District: Pak Jong-sun
34. Electoral District: Kim Tong-un
35. Electoral District: Pak Song-chol
36. Electoral District: Paek Hak-rim
37. Electoral District: Kim In-nam
38. Electoral District: Kim Yong-chun
39. Electoral District: O Ik-je
40. Electoral District: Pak Kwan-o
41. Electoral District: Kim Kwang-chol
42. Electoral District: Kim Ik-hyon
43. Electoral District: Paek Yong-chon
44. Electoral District: Kim Hwa-suk
45. Electoral District: Ri Hwa-sil
46. Electoral District: Kang Nam-ik
47. Electoral District: Song Chun-sik
48. Electoral District: Ri Tong-chan
49. Electoral District: Jong Myong-ok
50. Electoral District: Kim Il-chol
51. Electoral District: Hong Song-nam
52. Electoral District: Kim Song-hui
53. Electoral District: Pak Pong-nam
54. Electoral District: Kim Bok-sil
55. Electoral District: Im Man-sun
56. Electoral District: Chang Tok-yong
57. Electoral District: Mun Sok-bul
58. Electoral District: Ri Sung-ho
59. Electoral District: Kim Se-myong
60. Electoral District: Kim Ho-je
61. Electoral District: Kim Jung-rin
62. Electoral District: Kang Kwang-su
63. Electoral District: Ri Kyong-chol
64. Electoral District: Sin Il-nam
65. Electoral District: Mun Sang-min
66. Electoral District: Cho Yun-je
67. Electoral District: Ri Ung-chan
68. Electoral District: Han Jae-rok
69. Electoral District: Ri Jong-rok
70. Electoral District: Kim Chol-man
71. Electoral District: Hui Yong-ae
72. Electoral District: Kim Yong-chu
73. Electoral District: Ri Yong-yong
74. Electoral District: Ho Tuk-nam
75. Electoral District: No Kwang-chol
76. Electoral District: Kim Yun-hyok
77. Electoral District: Yun Ki-jong
78. Electoral District: Choe Hong-il
79. Electoral District: Ko In-ho
80. Electoral District: Yomchang Ryong
81. Electoral District: Kim Kuk-thae
82. Electoral District: Pyon Yong-reeb
83. Electoral District: Ri Kwang-ho
84. Electoral District: An Myong-ok
85. Electoral District: Chang Chol
86. Electoral District: Kim Yong-dae
87. Electoral District: So Chu-jong
88. Electoral District: Hwang Sun-hui
89. Electoral District: Choe Thae-bok
90. Electoral District: Kim Pong-sil
91. Electoral District: Cho Chang-tok
92. Electoral District: An In-kon
93. Electoral District: Ri Pong-su
94. Electoral District: Kim Myong-yun
95. Electoral District: Kye Yong-sam
96. Electoral District: Ro Pong-ho
97. Electoral District: Kim Ki-nam
98. Electoral District: Kang Sun-hui
99. Electoral District: Han Jong-hwa
100. Electoral District: Jong Ha-chol
101. Electoral District: Kim Ung-chol
102. Electoral District: Ri U-ho
103. Electoral District: Chae Hui-jong
104. Electoral District: Jong Wan-ik
105. Electoral District: Ri Yong-mu
106. Electoral District: Choe Punhui
107. Electoral District: Kim Yong-kil
108. Electoral District: Ri Yong-chol
109. Electoral District: Choe Ryong-ik
110. Electoral District: Kang Il-kwan
111. Electoral District: Chu Tong-il
112. Electoral District: Ri Kil-song
113. Electoral District: Kang Kwan-chu
114. Electoral District: Yu Pom-sun
115. Electoral District: Choe Ung-kwon
116. Electoral District: Kim Jong-kak
117. Electoral District: Paek Song-nam
118. Electoral District: Ri Mu-yong
119. Electoral District: Kim Kum-suk
120. Electoral District: Ri Jae-hang
121. Electoral District: Jong Yong-hyok
122. Electoral District: Pak Thae-hwa
123. Electoral District: Song Ho-kyong
124. Electoral District: Kim Sun-hwa
125. Electoral District: Chon Yong-sik
126. Electoral District: Kim Bok-sin
127. Electoral District: Kang Yong-sob
128. Electoral District: Ri Chang-won
129. Electoral District: Kim Sun-jib
130. Electoral District: Ra Song-hwan
131. Electoral District: Won Jong-sam
132. Electoral District: Ri Kum-pom
133. Electoral District: Rim Kyong-suk
134. Electoral District: Chang Song-u
135. Electoral District: Kim Ok-ryon
136. Electoral District: O Myong-il
137. Electoral District: Rim Sang-jong
138. Electoral District: Kang Pu-phil
139. Electoral District: Chi Jae-ryong
140. Electoral District: Mun Myong-hak
141. Electoral District: Yang Man-sik
142. Electoral District: Pak Tong-sok
143. Electoral District: Kim Yu-pong
144. Electoral District: So Pyong-bok
145. Electoral District: Ri Hi-il
146. Electoral District: Ryo Won-ku
147. Electoral District: Pak Yun-kon
148. Electoral District: Sin Ung-sik
149. Electoral District: Kim Tu-ik
150. Electoral District: Kim Yon-hwa
151. Electoral District: Kang Hyong-pong
152. Electoral District: Chon Jae-rok
153. Electoral District: Choe Sung-chol
154. Electoral District: Chang Pyong-thae
155. Electoral District: Kim Myong-hui
156. Electoral District: Choe Yong
157. Electoral District: Choe Jong-ryul
158. Electoral District: Ham Jong-kon
159. Electoral District: Han Kwang-bok
160. Electoral District: Kang Yong-thae
161. Electoral District: Jong Mun-son
162. Electoral District: Pak Yong-hun
163. Electoral District: Cho Tae-ha
164. Electoral District: Ra Yong-ran
165. Electoral District: Son Sok-kun
166. Electoral District: Kim Ryo-su
167. Electoral District: Kim Jae-hwa
168. Electoral District: Kwon Hyon-suk
169. Electoral District: Kim Jun-kol
170. Electoral District: Choe Song-won
171. Electoral District: Kang Chol-won
172. Electoral District: Chon Kum-chin
173. Electoral District: Ri Chu-o
174. Electoral District: Chang Ung
175. Electoral District: Kim Ryong-kun
176. Electoral District: Kim Jong-kil
177. Electoral District: Ryu Jae-myong
178. Electoral District: Pak Yong-sok
179. Electoral District: Ri Pong-ik
180. Electoral District: Jong Jae-sik
181. Electoral District: Kim Yong-sun
182. Electoral District: Ri Yong-kon
183. Electoral District: Kim Hui-sam
184. Electoral District: Kwak Chol-ho
185. Electoral District: Ho Hwan-chol
186. Electoral District: Choe Yong-tok
187. Electoral District: Hong Son-ok
188. Electoral District: Sin Thae-uk
189. Electoral District: An Chang-ryon
190. Electoral District: Han Un-kuk
191. Electoral District: Han Pyong-man
192. Electoral District: Kim Pong-su
193. Electoral District: Cho Kang-chol
194. Electoral District: Kim Mu-chon
195. Electoral District: Kim Chang-su
196. Electoral District: Ri Kwang-kun
197. Electoral District: Pak Myong-hun
198. Electoral District: Pyon Tok-sang
199. Electoral District: Kim Yong-sam
200. Electoral District: Kim Yang-kon
201. Electoral District: Choe Hu-yong
202. Electoral District: Kim Ik-chol
203. Electoral District: Choe Kwang-chol
204. Electoral District: Chon Kyong-son
205. Electoral District: Kim In-sun
206. Electoral District: Kim Hak-chol
207. Electoral District: Rim Tong-ok
208. Electoral District: Jong Yong-chol
209. Electoral District: Pak Yong-kil
210. Electoral District: Mun Jae-chol
211. Electoral District: Kim Phyong-hae
212. Electoral District: Paek Bok-nam
213. Electoral District: Pak Sun-hui
214. Electoral District: Son Kyong-nam
215. Electoral District: Chang Jae-on
216. Electoral District: Ri Sang-ryong
217. Electoral District: Chang Chol
218. Electoral District: Mun Hak-jun
219. Electoral District: Pak Kyong-sam
220. Electoral District: Ri Su-yong
221. Electoral District: Chang Chin-kon
222. Electoral District: So Chun-yong
223. Electoral District: Song Kwang-chol
224. Electoral District: Kim Hui-son
225. Electoral District: Kim Yong-jae
226. Electoral District: Cho Jong-rim
227. Electoral District: Yun Tong-hyon
228. Electoral District: O Sun-yong
229. Electoral District: Kim Tok-il
230. Electoral District: Ri Won-chol
231. Electoral District: Kim Ki-ryong
232. Electoral District: Kim Pong-il
233. Electoral District: Pak Song-sil
234. Electoral District: Son Un-song
235. Electoral District: Ri Kyong-pom
236. Electoral District: Hyon Won-kuk
237. Electoral District: Jong Son-mun
238. Electoral District: Cha Myong-ok
239. Electoral District: Chon Ho-chol
240. Electoral District: Mun Pyong-kum
241. Electoral District: An Yong-hyon
242. Electoral District: Han Pong-un
243. Electoral District: Ri Hong-sob
244. Electoral District: Ri Tuk-nam
245. Electoral District: Kim Su-cho
246. Electoral District: Paek Se-pong
247. Electoral District: Kwak Yong-nam
248. Electoral District: Pyon Thae-jun
249. Electoral District: Kim Hye-ran
250. Electoral District: Kim In-suk
251. Electoral District: O Su-yong
252. Electoral District: Kim Yong-jong
253. Electoral District: Pak Song
254. Electoral District: Ri Sang-mu
255. Electoral District: Kim Tae-sun
256. Electoral District: Yon Hyong-muk
257. Electoral District: Kang Won-jung
258. Electoral District: Jong Sung-jae
259. Electoral District: Han Song-kyu
260. Electoral District: Jong Chun-sil
261. Electoral District: Kim Tong-un
262. Electoral District: Ryom Hui-ryong
263. Electoral District: Sin Kwan-chin
264. Electoral District: Chu Kyu-chang
265. Electoral District: Ro Hae-sun
266. Electoral District: Kim Chae-ran
267. Electoral District: Kim Sun-yong
268. Electoral District: Kang Hye-suk
269. Electoral District: Pak Song-ok
270. Electoral District: Ryom In-yun
271. Electoral District: Kim Tong-son
272. Electoral District: Ri Chun-ku
273. Electoral District: Kim In-nam
274. Electoral District: Choe Ki-ryong
275. Electoral District: Kim Chi-tok
276. Electoral District: Ri Tan
277. Electoral District: Ryang Kyong-bok
278. Electoral District: Cho Kyong-chol
279. Electoral District: Ri Jong-suk
280. Electoral District: Choe Hui-jong
281. Electoral District: Choe Kyong-sul
282. Electoral District: Ho Jong-man
283. Electoral District: Hwang Yun-nam
284. Electoral District: Sung Sang-sob
285. Electoral District: Chi Sang-man
286. Electoral District: Ro Ik-hwa
287. Electoral District: Ho Nam-sun
288. Electoral District: Kim Chun-nyo
289. Electoral District: Kye Ung-thae
290. Electoral District: Ri Jong-son
291. Electoral District: Kim Il-ho
292. Electoral District: Ri Sang-chu
293. Electoral District: Hwang Sun-hui
294. Electoral District: An Sung-ok
295. Electoral District: Cho Kyu-il
296. Electoral District: Choe Su-hon
297. Electoral District: Kang Kil-yong
298. Electoral District: Paek Nam-il
299. Electoral District: Ri Jun-hui
300. Electoral District: Song Hyo-nam
301. Electoral District: Won Chang-ryong
302. Electoral District: Pak Jong-chin
303. Electoral District: Ri Chol
304. Electoral District: Ri Jong-suk
305. Electoral District: Kim Pyong-hwa
306. Electoral District: Ri Jong-kuk
307. Electoral District: Choe Chil-nam
308. Electoral District: Jong Ok-tong
309. Electoral District: Ri Myong-chol
310. Electoral District: Kim Jong
311. Electoral District: Choe Chin-su
312. Electoral District: So Pung-kun
313. Electoral District: Kim Pyong-ryul
314. Electoral District: Chu Chin-ku
315. Electoral District: An Min-chol
316. Electoral District: Choe Jong-kon
317. Electoral District: So Sung-chol
318. Electoral District: Thae Hyong-chol
319. Electoral District: Ham Song-to
320. Electoral District: Choe Su-il
321. Electoral District: Kim Pyong-hwan
322. Electoral District: Hong Kye-sik
323. Electoral District: Kwon Chun-hak
324. Electoral District: Hwang Hwi-sang
325. Electoral District: O Ung-chang
326. Electoral District: Mun Pyong-rok
327. Electoral District: Ri Kyong-sik
328. Electoral District: Ri Man-song
329. Electoral District: An Chun-sob
330. Electoral District: Kim Hwa-sun
331. Electoral District: Kim Ok-kyu
332. Electoral District: O Yong-chun
333. Electoral District: Pak Hui-tok
334. Electoral District: Kang Ryon-hak
335. Electoral District: Ri Thae-sik
336. Electoral District: Kim Un-ki
337. Electoral District: Kim Sung-ok
338. Electoral District: Choe Nam-kyun
339. Electoral District: Kim Pyong-hun
340. Electoral District: Pak Ui-chun
341. Electoral District: Kim Yong-sun
342. Electoral District: Song Yun-hui
343. Electoral District: Paek Sol
344. Electoral District: Chang Myong-sil
345. Electoral District: Choe Jong-son
346. Electoral District: Mun Kyong-tok
347. Electoral District: Cho Hye-suk
348. Electoral District: Han Song-ryong
349. Electoral District: Pak Jae-phil
350. Electoral District: Ri Hi-hon
351. Electoral District: Ri Kyong-il
352. Electoral District: Pak Tok-kwan
353. Electoral District: Ko Kyu-il
354. Electoral District: Kim Ryong-yon
355. Electoral District: Ra Chang-ryol
356. Electoral District: Song Sung-cho
357. Electoral District: Choe Yong-son
358. Electoral District: Pak Chol-hoe
359. Electoral District: Kim Yong-ae
360. Electoral District: Chae Kang-hwan
361. Electoral District: O Kuk-ryol
362. Electoral District: Kim Tok-jung
363. Electoral District: Yun Chol
364. Electoral District: Mun Il-pong
365. Electoral District: Kim Jong-ok
366. Electoral District: Sin Hyon-kwang
367. Electoral District: Yang Hyong-sob
368. Electoral District: Ko Jong-ik
369. Electoral District: Ro Pae-kwon
370. Electoral District: Paek Nam-sun
371. Electoral District: Ri Jong-sik
372. Electoral District: Won Tong-ku
373. Electoral District: Chu Ki-chan
374. Electoral District: Kim Song-ung
375. Electoral District: Pak Kwang-cho
376. Electoral District: Kim Si-hak
377. Electoral District: Hwang Sang-kwon
378. Electoral District: Kim Socha
379. Electoral District: Pak Myong-sik
380. Electoral District: Pak Nam-chol
381. Electoral District: Pong Chan-ho
382. Electoral District: Kim Jong-rok
383. Electoral District: Ri Chol-ho
384. Electoral District: Ro Tu-chol
385. Electoral District: Choe Kwang-chol
386. Electoral District: Pak Chang-ryon
387. Electoral District: An Kyong-ho
388. Electoral District: Kim Il-kun
389. Electoral District: Pae Tal-jun
390. Electoral District: Ri Chan-bok
391. Electoral District: Kim Ryong-song
392. Electoral District: Ri Kyo-sang
393. Electoral District: Kim Myong-kol
394. Electoral District: Kim Chi-won
395. Electoral District: Kim Pyong-song
396. Electoral District: Ri Kuk-su
397. Electoral District: Kim Yu-ho
398. Electoral District: Kim Won-il
399. Electoral District: Jong Ki-hun
400. Electoral District: So Man-sul
401. Electoral District: Hong Jong-ku
402. Electoral District: Han Won-il
403. Electoral District: Hong Sok-chin
404. Electoral District: Ri Yong-su
405. Electoral District: Ryu Kum-ryol
406. Electoral District: Kim Chin-kyu
407. Electoral District: Sok Kyong-su
408. Electoral District: U Tu-thae
409. Electoral District: Kim Jong-sim
410. Electoral District: Kim Yong-sik
411. Electoral District: Jong Song-ok
412. Electoral District: Son Kum-wol
413. Electoral District: Sin Pyong-chol
414. Electoral District: Ri Yong-son
415. Electoral District: So Sok-yun
416. Electoral District: Chon Son-ung
417. Electoral District: Kim In-bok
418. Electoral District: Ri Jong-hyok
419. Electoral District: O Kwang-chol
420. Electoral District: Jong Pyong-sang
421. Electoral District: Sim Sang-tae
422. Electoral District: Pyon Ryong-se
423. Electoral District: Son Sam-sul
424. Electoral District: Han Su-man
425. Electoral District: Kim Hong-su
426. Electoral District: Kim Ki-u
427. Electoral District: Mun Yong-chol
428. Electoral District: Kim Sung-yon
429. Electoral District: Ko Jong-tok
430. Electoral District: Chi Yong-chun
431. Electoral District: Ri Hwan-ki
432. Electoral District: Kang Nung-su
433. Electoral District: Pak Jung-kun
434. Electoral District: Sin Tae-kyun
435. Electoral District: Kwon Isun
436. Electoral District: Hwang Yong-sam
437. Electoral District: Kim Je-tong
438. Electoral District: Ri Mun-yong
439. Electoral District: Pak Sam-ho
440. Electoral District: Ri Kwang-nam
441. Electoral District: Choe Kwan-yong
442. Electoral District: Ri Jong-mu
443. Electoral District: Ri Chol-pong
444. Electoral District: Jong Mun-su
445. Electoral District: Ri Chang-han
446. Electoral District: Chon Hye-song
447. Electoral District: Ri Won-il
448. Electoral District: Chon Tae-won
449. Electoral District: Choe In-ho
450. Electoral District: Ko Son-ok
451. Electoral District: Nam Chin-hi
452. Electoral District: Han Chang-bin
453. Electoral District: Han Jae-myong
454. Electoral District: Kang Tok-su
455. Electoral District: Cha Kyong-il
456. Electoral District: Pak Myong-chol
457. Electoral District: Kim Yang-jom
458. Electoral District: Ho Yong-chun
459. Electoral District: Son Hyon-nam
460. Electoral District: Song Chun-sob
461. Electoral District: Ri Song-ung
462. Electoral District: Ri Ho-rim
463. Electoral District: Ri Je-son
464. Electoral District: Ryom Sun-kil
465. Electoral District: Kim Hwa-wol
466. Electoral District: Chu Yong-suk
467. Electoral District: Pak Song-il
468. Electoral District: Kim Yong-kuk
469. Electoral District: Kim Yang-kun
470. Electoral District: Pak Pong-chu
471. Electoral District: Sin An-son
472. Electoral District: Cho Pyong-chu
473. Electoral District: Jong Pyong-kon
474. Electoral District: U Won-sok
475. Electoral District: Ho Hak
476. Electoral District: Chang Myong-hak
477. Electoral District: Kim Jong-yong
478. Electoral District: Han U-chol
479. Electoral District: Ri Chu-ok
480. Electoral District: Ryu Kyong-ok
481. Electoral District: Ri Hyo-son
482. Electoral District: Yu Kyong-suk
483. Electoral District: Pak In-chu
484. Electoral District: Sin Song-u
485. Electoral District: Han Hui-hwan
486. Electoral District: Kim Man-sang
487. Electoral District: Kim Su-hak
488. Electoral District: Mun Yong-son
489. Electoral District: Tong Yong-il
490. Electoral District: Chon Chol-ku
491. Electoral District: Ri Ui-hyon
492. Electoral District: Ri Yong-ae
493. Electoral District: Chi Ki-son
494. Electoral District: Kim Sung-nam
495. Electoral District: Cha Sung-su
496. Electoral District: Kim Song-tok
497. Electoral District: Pak Mun-sik
498. Electoral District: Han Chu-hwan
499. Electoral District: Chang Yong-kol
500. Electoral District: Kim Pung-ki
501. Electoral District: Chang Tong-un
502. Electoral District: Kim Yong-kol
503. Electoral District: Pak Ik-tong
504. Electoral District: Pak Nam-gi
505. Electoral District: O Ki-sok
506. Electoral District: Ri Yong-suk
507. Electoral District: Ryang Su-jong
508. Electoral District: Kang Thae-mu
509. Electoral District: Hwang Jae-kyong
510. Electoral District: Kim Wan-su
511. Electoral District: Ri Thae-nam
512. Electoral District: Kim Jae-kwon
513. Electoral District: Chang Sun-kum
514. Electoral District: U Tong-chuk
515. Electoral District: Hong Sa-yon
516. Electoral District: Kim Song-hun
517. Electoral District: Chon Kyong-nam
518. Electoral District: Kim Kyu-hun
519. Electoral District: Pak Song-su
520. Electoral District: Phil Yong-kun
521. Electoral District: Chang Il-son
522. Electoral District: Pak Kil-yon
523. Electoral District: Kim Pong-sik
524. Electoral District: Pak Song-chun
525. Electoral District: Song Jun-thaek
526. Electoral District: Ko Jong-sik
527. Electoral District: Hwang Pong-yong
528. Electoral District: Chang Son-ok
529. Electoral District: Nam Song-rok
530. Electoral District: Hwang Ok-son
531. Electoral District: Cho Myong-yong
532. Electoral District: Cho Yun-hui
533. Electoral District: Kim Chang-kyu
534. Electoral District: Ko chung ho
535. Electoral District: Sin Tong-son
536. Electoral District: Kim Kye-kwan
537. Electoral District: Kim Tu-nam
538. Electoral District: Kim Kyong-ho
539. Electoral District: Song Sun-nyo
540. Electoral District: Ho Han-ryong
541. Electoral District: Kim Yong-chin
542. Electoral District: Choe Kwan-jun
543. Electoral District: Ri Ho
544. Electoral District: Ri Jong-sik
545. Electoral District: Kim Chun-kum
546. Electoral District: Hong Sok-hyong
547. Electoral District: Thae Chang-hon
548. Electoral District: Ko Ki-hun
549. Electoral District: Tong Hun
550. Electoral District: Chon Sung-hun
551. Electoral District: Chu Chun-sob
552. Electoral District: Han Hung-phyo
553. Electoral District: Kim Min-suk
554. Electoral District: Chon Song-ho
555. Electoral District: Thae Son-hui
556. Electoral District: Kim Hyong-chan
557. Electoral District: Song Kum-ok
558. Electoral District: Chon Pyong-sob
559. Electoral District: Kim Won-bok
560. Electoral District: Kim Thae-pong
561. Electoral District: Choe Kil-chu
562. Electoral District: Phyo Il-sok
563. Electoral District: Song Ryong-su
564. Electoral District: Kim Ui-sun
565. Electoral District: Kim Tong-il
566. Electoral District: Song Jong-hui
567. Electoral District: Pak Su-kil
568. Electoral District: Ri Kwi-ok
569. Electoral District: Ri Sang-chol
570. Electoral District: Ri Thae-il
571. Electoral District: Kim Song-jong
572. Electoral District: Han Chi-sol
573. Electoral District: Jong Chan-kyong
574. Electoral District: Sok Kil-ho
575. Electoral District: Rim Yong-chol
576. Electoral District: Pak Kwang-chol
577. Electoral District: Pak Myong-hun
578. Electoral District: Jong Yong-son
579. Electoral District: Choe Yong-ho
580. Electoral District: Kim Su-yol
581. Electoral District: Pak Chang-sik
582. Electoral District: Hong Rin-sob
583. Electoral District: Chon Kwang-rok
584. Electoral District: Chang In-suk
585. Electoral District: Chu Sun-ok
586. Electoral District: Chang Yong-sok
587. Electoral District: Rim Juk-son
588. Electoral District: Ri Il-nam
589. Electoral District: Pak Chol-ho
590. Electoral District: Kim Myong-hui
591. Electoral District: Ri Pong-juk
592. Electoral District: Han Myong-kuk
593. Electoral District: Kim Hyong-tok
594. Electoral District: Choe Chun-hwang
595. Electoral District: Pak Kun-su
596. Electoral District: Cha Yong-chol
597. Electoral District: Choe Ki-jun
598. Electoral District: Ri Kong-phil
599. Electoral District: Choe Tok-chu
600. Electoral District: Yon Thae-jong
601. Electoral District: Kim Kyong-ho
602. Electoral District: Song Jong-su
603. Electoral District: Ri Hyon-sob
604. Electoral District: Kim Yong-il
605. Electoral District: Pak Kil-man
606. Electoral District: Kim Tong-kyu
607. Electoral District: Kim Tong-hyob
608. Electoral District: Ri Yong-bok
609. Electoral District: Kim Tuk-sam
610. Electoral District: Jong Un-op
611. Electoral District: Ri Ho-hyon
612. Electoral District: Kim Yong-il
613. Electoral District: O Se-in
614. Electoral District: Jong Myong-cho
615. Electoral District: Ri Hye-chol
616. Electoral District: Ko Myong-hui
617. Electoral District: Kim Su-tok
618. Electoral District: Chon Pyong-ho
619. Electoral District: Kwak Pom-ki
620. Electoral District: Kim Hyong-nam
621. Electoral District: Mun Ung-cho
622. Electoral District: Kil Chol-hyok
623. Electoral District: Kim Tok-hun
624. Electoral District: Kim Jong-suk
625. Electoral District: Rim Myong-hwan
626. Electoral District: Im Jong-sil
627. Electoral District: Cho Hui-kon
628. Electoral District: Kim Yun-sim
629. Electoral District: Choe Jun-kil
630. Electoral District: Han Sung-ro
631. Electoral District: O Kum-chol
632. Electoral District: Cha Jun-sik
633. Electoral District: Ri Pyong-chol
634. Electoral District: Han Tu-hyon
635. Electoral District: Kim Ki-son
636. Electoral District: Ri Chun-il
637. Electoral District: Kim Sung-yon
638. Electoral District: Pak Jae-kyong
639. Electoral District: Ryo Chun-sok
640. Electoral District: Pang Chang-tok
641. Electoral District: Kim Sang-ik
642. Electoral District: Ri Yong-kil
643. Electoral District: Hyon Chol-hae
644. Electoral District: Ri Won-jong
645. Electoral District: Ri Si-jung
646. Electoral District: Kim Won-hong
647. Electoral District: Ri Ho
648. Electoral District: Choe Hyong-kwan
649. Electoral District: Kim Jong Il
650. Electoral District: Ri Hyong-ryong
651. Electoral District: Jong Ho-kyun
652. Electoral District: Chon Chin-su
653. Electoral District: Pak Chang-kon
654. Electoral District: Kim Mun-jong
655. Electoral District: Pyon In-son
656. Electoral District: Chang Yong-pong
657. Electoral District: Kim Ryong-un
658. Electoral District: Chu Sun-chol
659. Electoral District: Kim Hyong-ryong
660. Electoral District: Chon Jae-kwon
661. Electoral District: Kim Jong-hyon
662. Electoral District: Kim Ul-yong
663. Electoral District: Ri Myong-su
664. Electoral District: Nam Sang-rak
665. Electoral District: Ryom Yong-hi
666. Electoral District: Ri Yong-ho
667. Electoral District: Pak Won-sik
668. Electoral District: Jong Myong-to
669. Electoral District: Pak Yong-sik
670. Electoral District: Ri Thae-pong
671. Electoral District: Ho Song-il
672. Electoral District: Sin Kum-yon
673. Electoral District: Jong Chang-ryol
674. Electoral District: Pak Yun-hwal
675. Electoral District: Ri Pyong-sam
676. Electoral District: Chon Chang-bok
677. Electoral District: Yun Jong-rin
678. Electoral District: Kim Kum-son
679. Electoral District: Ri Kuk-jun
680. Electoral District: Kim Chang-sob
681. Electoral District: Kim Sung-pom
682. Electoral District: Choe Ryong-su
683. Electoral District: Sim Won-il
684. Electoral District: Ri Mu-ung
685. Electoral District: Kim Jong-nam
686. Electoral District: Ro Kyong-jun
687. Electoral District: Pak In-yong
