= Judiciary of North Korea =

Court system of North Korea

The North Korean judicial system is based on the Soviet model. It includes the Central Court of the Democratic People's Republic of Korea, Provincial and special-city level Courts, local People's Courts, and Special Courts.

The Central Court is the highest court, with its judges appointed by the Supreme People's Assembly (SPA). According to the Constitution of North Korea, the Central Court is accountable to the SPA, and the Criminal Code subjects judges to criminal liability for handing down "unjust sentences".

== Supreme Court ==
The Central Court is the highest court and court of appeal in North Korea.

The court is headed by a Chief Judge(판사) or President(소장), two Associate Chief Judges/Vice Presidents and unknown number of regular Justices.

The court's home was completed in 2010

=== Former Chief Judges and Associate Judges ===
- Pang Hak Se 1972–1992; Chief Judge
- Kim Pyong Ryul 1998–2012; died 2013
- Choe Yong-song - Associate Judge
- Hyon Hong-sam - Associate Judge

== Lower Courts of North Korea ==
Below the high court are three other judicial levels:

- Provincial People's Courts (Korean: 도 인민재판소), located in the capital cities of the provinces and is serving as the highest judicial authority in a given province.
- County People's Courts (Korean: 군 인민재판소), operates in rural areas at the county level (the main administrative unit outside major cities) and is subordinated to the Provincial People's Court.
- City People’s Courts (Korean: 시 인민재판소), located in smaller and medium-sized cities that are not subdivided into urban districts and is subordinated to the Provincial People's Court.
- District People's Courts (Korean: 구역 인민재판소), exists in large cities that are divided into administrative districts, such as Pyongyang. They serve as the lowest-level courts inside big urban centers, functioning like neighborhood-level courts. They report to the City People’s Court of that city, which then answers to the Provincial People's Court.

== Judicial independence ==
Article 164 (Formerly Article 157) of the Constitution of North Korea states that "cases are heard in public, and the accused is guaranteed the right to a defense; hearings may be closed to the public as stipulated by law". The lack of judicial independence is also evidenced by Article 11 of the Prosecution Supervisory Law that stipulates "The prosecutor(s) shall supervise whether the trial or arbitration of a case is accurately deliberating and resolving the legal requirements and in a timely manner."

== Organization ==
The Constitution states that justice is administered by the Central Court, Provincial or special-city level courts, the People's Court or Special Courts, and the courts are accountable to the Supreme People's Assembly (SPA) or when it is not in session, its Presidium.

== See also ==
- Law enforcement in North Korea
- Law of North Korea
- Judiciary of South Korea
