= Committees of the 12th Supreme People's Assembly =

12th Committees
- Sign of the Supreme People's Assembly

9 April 2009 – 9 April 2014 (5 years, 0 days) Overview
- Type: Budget Committee; Legislation Committee; Credentials Committee
- Election: 1st Session of the 12th Supreme People's Assembly

The committees of the 12th Supreme People's Assembly (SPA) of North Korea were elected by the 1st Session of the aforementioned body on 9 April 2009. It was replaced on 9 April 2014 by the committees of the 13th Supreme People's Assembly.

== Committees ==
=== Budget ===
Rank	Name	Hangul	11th COM	13th COM	Positions
1	Ju Sang-song	주상성	Not made public	Demoted	Chairman of the SPA Budget Committee
2	Ri Kil-song	리길송	Not made public	Demoted	—
3	Kim Pyong-ryul	김병률	Not made public	Demoted	—
4	Kim Phyong-hae	김평해	Not made public	Demoted	—
5	Song Ja-rip	송자립	Not made public	Demoted	—
6	Pak Kwan-o	박관오	Not made public	Demoted	—
7	Kim Yong-il	김용일	Not made public	Demoted	—

=== Legislation ===
Rank	Name	Hangul	11th COM	13th COM	Positions
1	Pak Nam-gi	박남기	Old	Reelected	Chairman of the SPA Bills Committee
2	Ri Chol-bong	리철봉	Not made public	Demoted	—
3	Hong So-hon	홍소혼	Not made public	Reelected	—
4	Kye Yong-sam	계용삼	Not made public	Demoted	—
5	Mun Myong-hak	문명학	Not made public	Demoted	—
6	Kim Myong-hwan	김명환	Not made public	Reelected	—
7	Jo Hye-suk	조혜석	Not made public	Reelected	—

=== Credentials ===
Not all members made public.

Rank	Name	Hangul	11th COM	13th COM	Positions
1	Kim Kuk-thae	김국태	Old	Demoted	—
