= Committees of the 13th Supreme People's Assembly =

North Korean government committees

13th Committees
- Sign of the Supreme People's Assembly

9 April 2014 – 11 April 2019 (5 years, 2 days) Overview
- Type: Budget Committee; Legislation Committee; Credentials Committee
- Election: 1st Session of the 13th Supreme People's Assembly

The committees of the 13th Supreme People's Assembly (SPA) of North Korea were elected by the 1st Session of the aforementioned body on 9 April 2014. It was replaced on 11 April 2019 by the committees of the 14th Supreme People's Assembly.

== Committees ==
=== Budget ===
Rank	Name	Hangul	12th COM	14th COM	Positions
1	O Su-yong	오수용	New	Reelected	Chairman of the SPA Budget Committee
2	Pak Yong-ho	박용호	New	Demoted	—
3	Kye Yong-sam	계용삼	New	Demoted	—
4	Hong So-hon	홍소혼	New	Reelected	—
5	Kim Hui-suk	김희석	New	Demoted	—
6	Choe Yong-il	최용일	New	Reelected	—
7	Pak Hyong-ryol	박형렬	New	Reelected	—

=== Legislation ===
Rank	Name	Hangul	12th COM	14th COM	Positions
1	Choe Pu-il	최부일	New	Reelected	Chairman of the SPA Bills Committee
2	Jang Pyong-gyu	장평규	New	Demoted	—
3	Pak Myong-chol	박명철	New	Demoted	—
4	Pak Thae-dok	박태덕	New	Demoted	—
5	Thae Hyong-chol	태형철	New	Demoted	—
6	Cha Hui-rim	차희림	New	Demoted	—
7	Pak Myong-guk	박명국	New	Demoted	—

=== Deputy Credentials ===
Rank	Name	Hangul	12th COM	14th COM	Positions
1	Kim Phyong-hae	김평해	Not made public	Not made public	Chairman of the SPA Deputy Credentials Committee
2	Pak Yong-sik	박용식	Not made public	Not made public	—
3	Kang Phil-hun	강필훈	Not made public	Not made public	—
4	Ri Man-gon	리만건	Not made public	Not made public	—
5	Cha Yong-myong	차용명	Not made public	Not made public	—
6	Kim Yong-ho	김용호	Not made public	Not made public	—
7	Kim Hyong-nam	김형남	Not made public	Not made public	—

=== Foreign Affairs ===
Rank	Name	Hangul	14th COM	Positions
1	Ri Su-yong	리수용	Reelected	Chairman of the SPA Foreign Affairs Committee
2	Ri Ryong-nam	리룡남	Reelected	—
3	Ri Son-gwon	리선권	Reelected	—
4	Kim Jong-suk	김정숙	Reelected	—
5	Kim Kye-gwan	김계관	Demoted	—
6	Kim Tong-son	김통손	Demoted	—
7	Jong Yong-won	종용원	Demoted	—
