= Law enforcement in Korea =

Law enforcement in Korea is the subject of two separate articles:

- Law enforcement in North Korea
- Law enforcement in South Korea
