= South Korean Patent Act =

South Korean enactment

South Korean Patent Act is a government enactment meant to facilitate technological development and contribute to industrial development of the entire South Korean republic.

== History ==
The Patent Act of Korea states in Article 1, “the purpose of this Act is to facilitate technological development and contribute to industrial development by protecting and encouraging invention and promoting its exploitation.” This indicates that “protection for the invention” and “inventive application” are two the central concept that is essential for the purpose development of the industry. Patent Act was implemented in Korea by Japan when Japan has invaded Korea after defeating China on August 29 in China/Russia – Japan War. After Japan won in World War 2 and when Korea regained independence, the Patents Administrative Incorporation Committee was founded on January 4, 1946, after that, the ‘Patents Office’ was established on January 22. Followed on October 15, 1946, the Patent Act was declared, the Utility Model Act and the Design Act was formed, including a legal system for industrial property. Korean Patent Act is unique while useful since it provides the same opportunity for all members in our global society, but not only limited to South Korean.

-1908: Korean patent promulgation

-1946: Establishment of patent office and establishment of patent law

-1961: Separation of Patent Law into Industrial Property Rights Act

-1977: Opened by the Patent Office

-1979: Joined the World Intellectual Property Organization (WIPO)

-1980: Participation in the Paris Convention

-1984: Participated in the Patent Cooperation Treaty

Patent Act for protectning Inventions and ideas in South Korea

Korean Patent Court & Supreme Court
- Considered by: Patent Law (Intellectual Property Organization)
- Enacted by: Korean Patent Court & Supreme Court

Related legislation
- Invention, Patent

== Introduction to Korean Patent Act ==
=== Composition of the Korean Patent Act ===
- The Act is composed 232 Articles, after the full amendment in 2017, the period for filing a patent application will be reduced from five years to three years, and a patent cancellation system will be introduced.
- This section describes the patent law of South Korea among the contents of the patent. The Korean Patent Act is described in the way how an invention is defined and what invention can be patented or not.
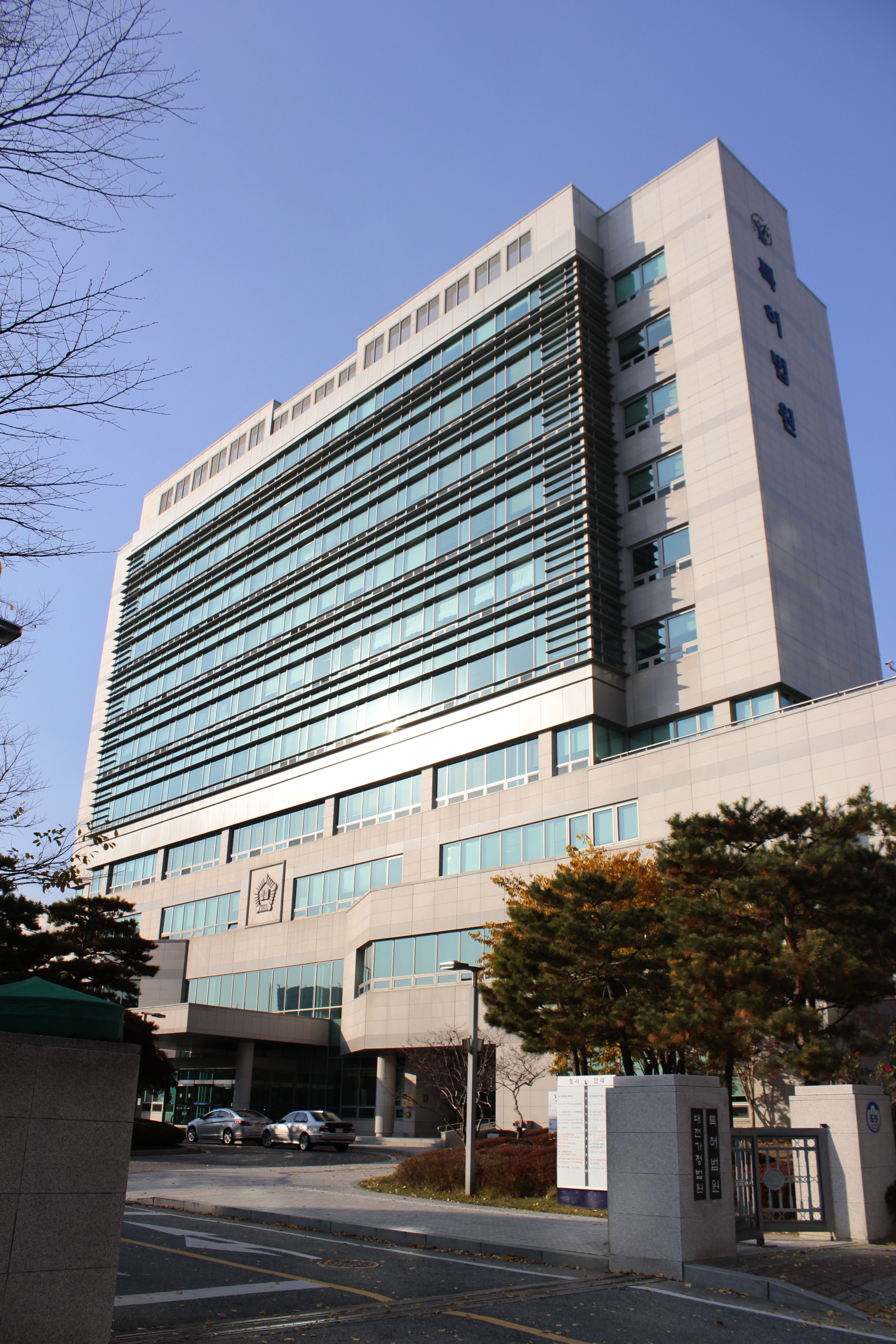
  This is an image of Patent Court of Korea, where people get judgement to register their own invention.

Chapter	Article	Contents
Chapter 1	Articles 1 to 28	General Rule
Chapter 2	Articles 29 to 56	Patent Requirements and Application
Chapter 3	Articles 57 to 78	Judge
Chapter 4	Articles 79 to 86	Patent fee and patent registration
Chapter 5	Article 87 to 125	Patent
Chapter 6	Articles 126 to 132	Protection of Patents
Chapter 6.2	Articles 132 to 132	Patent fee and patent registration
Chapter 7	Articles 132 to 177	Referee
Chapter 8	Articles 178 to 185	Reconsideration
Chapter 9	Articles 186 to 191	Lawsuit
Chapter 10	Articles 192 to 214	International patent application
Chapter 11	Articles 215 to 224	Provision
Chapter 12	Articles 225 to 232	Penalty

=== Purpose ===
“Article 1 (Purpose) The purpose of this Act is to promote the development of technologies and to contribute to industrial development by protecting and supporting inventions and promoting the use of inventions.”

According to Article 1 of the Patent Law, protection of the invention is intended for the purpose of the law. Patent law is strongly influenced by national industrial policy or technology level due to the nature of the law. As technology develops over time and data related to judgments, judgments, and litigation accumulate, law amendments are frequent and are usually revised more than once a year.

=== Definitions ===
“Article 2 (Definitions)

The terms used in this Act shall be defined as follows:

1. “Invention” refers to the creation of technical ideas using natural laws that are highly advanced.

2. “Patent Invention” means a patented invention

3. “Conduct” means an act according to the following categories.

A. Invention of an object:

If the object is used for production, use, transfer, rental (including the display for transfer or lease, the same shall apply hereinafter) or being sub-scripted or became as a loan of the item

B. Invention of the means: The action of the using the mean

C. The inventor of the methods for producing goods: To use, transfer, lend or import goods produced by the method other than the act of giving or submitting, or to subscribe for the transfer or lending of the goods.

== Patent inventions ==
=== Establishment of invention ===
==== Judgement of the formality of the invention ====
a. Subjective standards

The examiner is judged at the examination stage, the judge agreement body at the judgment stage, and the judge at the court.

b. Object criteria

The invention is based on the device as outlined in the claims of the claims, taking into consideration the description of the invention and the drawings and taking the technical field into account.

c. Timely standard

Rule: it is judged based on the time of patent application in the examination process.

==== Establishment of the invention ====
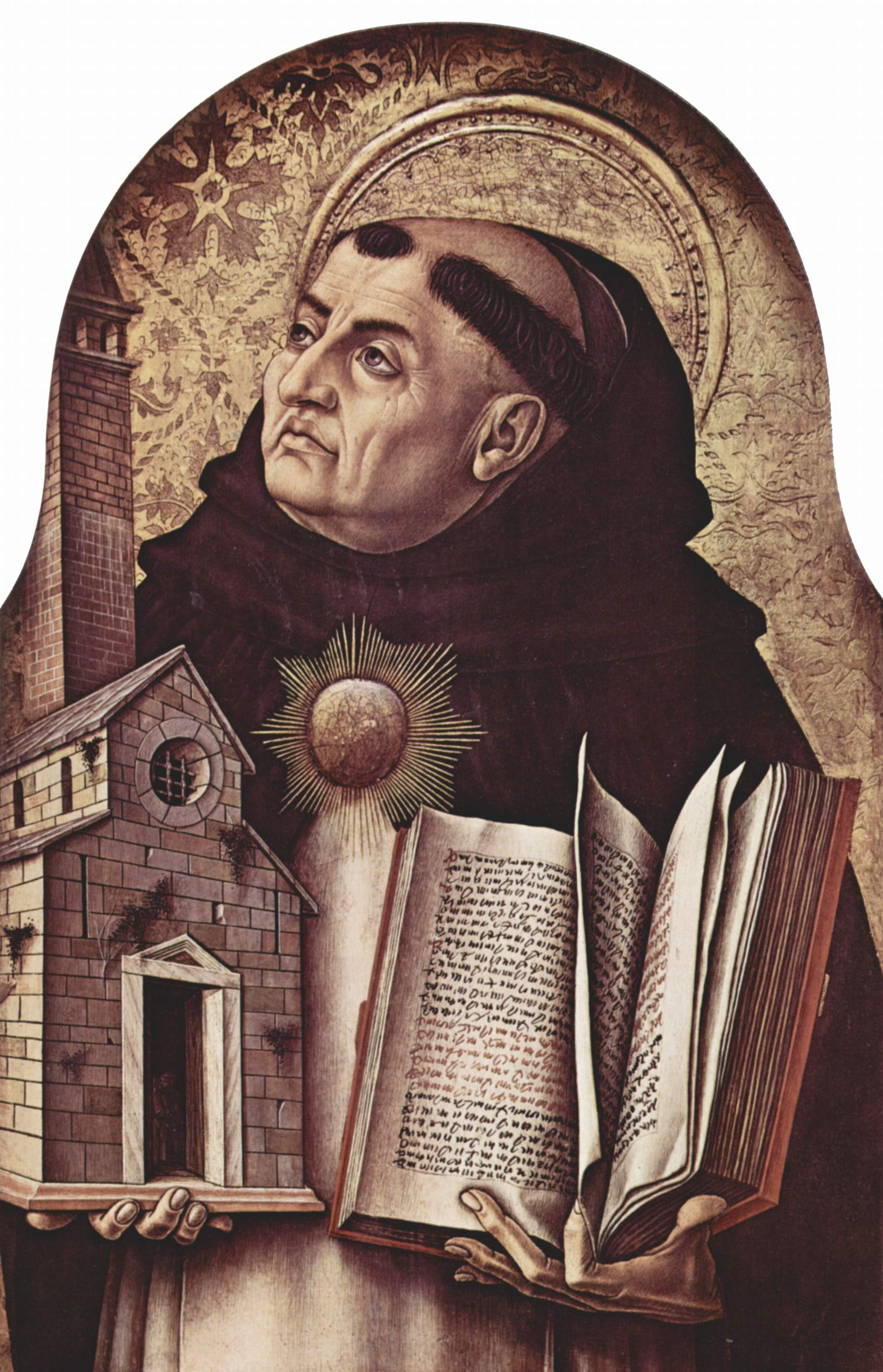
Thomas Aquinas, a Catholic philosopher of the Middle Ages, revived and developed the concept of natural law from ancient Greek philosophy

==== Use of natural laws ====
a. Natural Law

This includes various laws that describe the phenomena of the natural world, such as the physics and chemistry that people learn at school. Since permanent institutions ignore the first law of the thermodynamics and the second law of thermodynamics, until the exception of the above two requirements is scientifically proven, it can never be patented under Korean Patent Law.

b. Use

i. Use as a whole: The invention should be used as a whole of natural laws. In the patent act, if some of the constituent elements of the invention did not mention the natural law, is not treated as the natural law was used. (Except for inventions related to computer programs)

ii. Constant certainty and reproducibility: At the level of a person with ordinary skill to which the invention belongs, the invention must be able to repeat the same result with absolute certainty. It does not mean that confidence and reproducibility should be 100%. (However, in the invention of plants and microorganisms, it is more relaxed)

iii. Unnecessary recognition

It is not necessary for the inventor to have an accurate and complete awareness of the laws of nature. In other words, it is not required to know that falling water is caused by gravity in the invention of the spinning mill.

==== Use of technical thought (technical thinking) ====
Technology means that it can be used as a concrete means for achieving a specific purpose. Thought refers to abstract and conceptual ideas. In patent act, inventions are not necessarily technical but only requires scientific ideas. Therefore, the invention must not be a simple “thought” until the filing date, and it must be a “technical idea.” Instead, when considering the scope of the right, it is desirable to protect the “technical idea” as a patent because it is likely that the range of the right can be narrowly interpreted it the application is made in the form of “technology.”

==== Creativity ====
An invention must be made by human's artificial metal activity, and from this aspect, it is distinguished with ‘discovery.’ Discovery is to find the one that has already existed before, whereas inventions are fundamentally different in that they create new things that were never existed before.

==== Altitude ====
It merely illustrates the higher level of creativity of technical thoughts. The purpose of the patent act is to define the concept of invention and to be highly sophisticated to distinguish it from the design of the utility model.

== Statutory and non-statutory invention ==
(Applicability indicates the usefulness of something for a particular task)

The Korean Patent Act defines the invention as follows.

“Article 29 (Requirements for Patent Registration)

<1> An invention publicly known or executed in the Republic of Korea or in a foreign country prior to the filling of a patent application”

Industrial applicability is a criterion that an invention can be used in an industry. The industry referred this quote is broader than industrial availability under the Design Protection Act. In other words, if it is an invention that can be used regardless of primary, secondary, or tertiary industries. However, as it was mentioned above, since computer programs are a set of commands, they are intangible and they are only the promise between human and computer.

=== Statutory inventions ===
Under the Patent Act Article 2, "Invention means the highly advanced creation of a technical idea utilizing the laws of nature", the invention shall satisfy the provision in order for a filed patent application to be statutory under the Patent Act. (Definition of inventions from article 2 also applies equally to computer-implemented inventions.) However, the term "highly advanced" has been distinguishable to "device" under the Utility Model Act from "Invention" under the Patent Act, and this term is disobliged in deciding whether the invention is statutory or not.^{[5]}

=== Non-statutory inventions ===
a. Non-Invention: Natural law itself

b. Incomplete Invention: Only limited to mere discoveries but not creation.

It indicates the inventions which are uncompleted from the mere discoveries or mere invention of an idea. Explicitly, means for solving the problems of the invention are presented, but it is an incomplete invention when the issue of the invention is remarkably doubtful in the view of the natural law. Moreover, it is an unfinished invention that is uncertain about the future feasibility of technology at present. For instance, using the time machine as a stock trading methods cannot be determined by assuming that a time machine will be created in the future.

==== Novelty ====
“Article 29 (Requirements for Patent Registration)

<2> An invention published in a publication distributed in the Republic of Korea or in a foreign country or an invention disclosed to the public via telecommunications lines prior to the filling of a patent application.”

Novelty means a standard of developed invention that no one can easily imitate the invention. Thus, the invention claimed to be “novelty-lost” means that the invention has been performed publicly prior to the time of filing of the patent application, or that it has been released by telecommunication lines established by the distribution, publication and presidential decree.

There are four criteria for judging novelty:

i. Notification to the unspecified large number of people at home and abroad:

According to the precedent, a factory that has an invention has been visited by an unspecified number, even if it does not ask about the invention or show it directly.

ii. Performed at home and abroad:

According to the case, the invention of a new hybrid engine and the appearance of the car with this engine on the motor show is not a public announcement about the invention of the hybrid engine at home and abroad. The reason is that the motor show is an exhibition that displays the exterior and interior of the car, not an exhibition that opens the bonnet to the engine.

iii. Published in domestic and international publications

The Editorial Board or the Journal Editorial Board does not correspond to the unspecified majority mentioned here, and according to the precedent, from the time when the facts existed apart from reading the articles in the library.

iiii. Publicly available via telecommunication lines

==== Progressive ====
Notwithstanding paragraph (1), an invention easily creatable by a person with ordinary knowledge in the technical field of the invention, based on the invention referred to in any subparagraph of paragraph (1), before the filing of the patent application, shall not be patentable.

The term Progressive indicates that innovative technology has advanced to such an extent that another person having ordinary knowledge (ordinary skill) cannot easily follow the invention. That is to say, "there is no inventive step" means that the invention that can be facilitated by a person with ordinary knowledge from a technology disclosed before the time of patent application, which cannot be patented. This is usually judged that when there is no inventive step if the patent-pending invention is a replacement of some of the technologies which were disclosed before the patent application date with a well-known and self-evident technology, or a combination of multiple technologies revealed before the patent application point. Since there are many subjective factors involved in whether or not it can be easily invented, there is no perfect standard for whether or not there is inventiveness. Therefore, whether or not it can be quickly developed can be judged individually for each case.

In the case of Samsung v. Apple, the second patent lawsuit that followed was the victory of the last US federal Court of Appeals by invalidating Apple's patents for its inventiveness (non-obviousness as US patent law) (Currently, Apple objected to the invalidation and non-infringement, but it overturned it with a request for a consensus by the Supreme Court, and Samsung received a judgment against the infringement.) Samsung is currently filing an appeal with the Supreme Court of the United States, but it is not easy to get permission.

=== Invention of questionable form ability ===
(It is not either statutory nor non-statutory)

The Korean patent law with the definition of the invention can be an advantage in terms of legal stability compared with other countries' patent law which does not have the description of the invention in terms of nature, but it is a disadvantage in terms of specific feasibility. In other words, it means that it is difficult to respond flexibly to the changing industries. Therefore, Korean patent law has a form in which legal stability is given priority, and concrete validity is supplemented.

== See also ==
- Patent Law
- Korean law
- Creativity
- Law
- Technology
- Invention
- Science
- Computer Science
- Intellectual property organizations
