= Supreme Court (North Korea) =

Supreme judicial organ of North Korea

Supreme Court of the Democratic People's Republic of Korea
- Interactive map of Supreme Court of the Democratic People's Republic of Korea
- Location: Pyongyang, North Korea
- Composition method: Elected by the Supreme People's Assembly
- Authorised by: Constitution of North Korea
- Judge term length: Five years
- Number of positions: Unknown

President
- Currently: Choe Kun-yong

First Vice-President
- Currently: Ri Il-chol

- Supreme Court
- Hangul: 조선민주주의인민공화국 중앙재판소
- Hanja: 朝鮮民主主義人民共和國中央裁判所
- Lit.: Central Court of the Democratic People's Republic of Korea
- RR: Joseon minjujuui inmin gonghwaguk jungang jaepanso
- MR: Chosŏn minjujuŭi inmin konghwaguk chungang chaep'anso

The Supreme Court of the Democratic People's Republic of Korea is the supreme judicial organ of North Korea.

The Court is accountable to the Supreme People's Assembly (SPA). The SPA elects its justices, and the SPA Standing Committee elects its chief justices and jurors.

Normally, the Supreme Court serves as the highest appellate court in North Korea, but in certain legal cases it is the court of first instance. These cases include crimes against the state. When it is the court of first instance, the court's decision is always final and cannot be appealed or challenged.

The Supreme Court has separate chambers for criminal, civil, and special matters.

== Tasks and organization ==
As the supreme court of North Korea, it is the highest organ of the judiciary of the country.

The Supreme Court is one of the two main components of the post-1945 judicial system, along with the Supreme Procurator's Office of the Democratic People's Republic of Korea. It does not exercise the power of judicial review over the constitutionality of executive or legislative actions nor does it have an activist role in protecting the constitutionally guaranteed rights of individuals against state actions. Instead, these powers are exercised by the Standing Committee of the Supreme People's Assembly, which is dominated by Korean Workers' Party and has never ruled a law unconstitutional.

Its task is to supervise all lower courts in the country, including their trials and proceedings, as well as the training of judges. The Supreme Court also appoints and recalls judges of the special courts (that is, the Military Court and the Traffic and Transportation Court that serves railway and waterways).

The Supreme Court is accountable to the Supreme People's Assembly (SPA), and when the latter is in recess, to its Standing Committee.

The court was initially called the Supreme Court, but later renamed the Central Court. The 2012 Kim Il Sung–Kim Jong Il Constitution restored the Supreme Court as its name, until a SPA session reverted to the name Central Court in 2016. The court is based in the capital Pyongyang.

== Justices ==
The Supreme Court is staffed by a chief justice or president, two associate chief justices or vice presidents, and an unknown number of regular justices.

The president and justices are elected and serve for five year teams. The SPA also elects, and can recall, the president. The Standing Committee of the SPA elects other justices of the court, as well as its jurors.

=== President ===
The president is Choe Kun-yong. The first vice-president is Kim Hwan, who replaced Yun Myong-guk. The other two current vice presidents are Choe Ryong-song and Kim Chong-du. Previous vice presidents have included Choe Yong-song and Hyon Hong-sam.

Kang Yun-sok replaced Pak Myong-chol, who had held the post since 2014. Pak was preceded by Kim Pyong-ryul, appointed in 1998, and re-elected in 2003. Before him, Pang Hak-se had been the president between 1972 and his death in July 1992.

Portrait	Name	Took office	Left office
	Kim Ik-son 김익선 (1918–)	9 September 1948	2 March 1955
	Cho Song-mo 조성모 (1905–)	2 March 1955	27 January 1956
	Hwang Se-hwan 황세환 (1909–)	13 March 1956	20 September 1957
	Kim Ha-un 김하운	20 September 1957	28 October 1959
	Ho Jong-suk 허정숙 (1908–1991)	28 October 1959	24 November 1960
	Kim Ik-son 김익선 (1918–)	24 November 1960	30 September 1966
	Ri Kuk-jin 리국진 (1905–1980)	30 September 1966	16 December 1967
	Ri Yong-gu 리용구 (1915–1970)	16 December 1967	10 February 1970
	Pang Hak-se 방학세 (1914–1992)	28 December 1972	18 July 1992
	Choe Won-ik 최원익 (1928–2001)	11 December 1992	5 September 1998
	Kim Pyong-ryul 김병률 (1930–2013)	5 September 1998	5 November 2013
	Pak Myong-chol 박명철 (born 1941)	9 April 2014	29 June 2016
	Kang Yun-sok 강윤석	29 June 2016	29 September 2021
	Cha Myong-nam 차명남	29 September 2021	1 March 2023
	Choe Kun-yong 최근영	1 March 2023	Incumbent

== Decisions ==
The Supreme Court has three chambers: one for criminal, civil, and special matters.

Normally, the Supreme Court is the highest appellate court in the country, for both criminal and civil law cases. For some cases, for example, crimes against the state, it is the court of first instance. When the Supreme Court is the court of first instance, its decision is always final and cannot be appealed or challenged. This is considered an impediment on the right to a fair trial, of which the right to appeal is part of.

The Supreme Court participates in the sentencing of political criminals. The State Security Department can determine sentences for political offenders in the name of the court. For offenders of the Criminal Law of North Korea, the Supreme Court has recommended capital punishment. Summary and arbitrary executions outside the procedure involving the Supreme Court take place in the country, too, sometimes with torture leading up to a confession.

Trials of foreigners are always taken directly to the Supreme Court. This is true despite the fact that crimes against the nation and people, which foreigners are usually accused of, should, according to the Criminal Procedure Law of North Korea, be tried at local-level courts first. The decision to take foreigners to the Supreme Court seems to have been taken to make such trials speedy. Trials of foreigners have involved Americans detained in North Korea such as Aijalon Gomes, Euna Lee, Laura Ling, Matthew Todd Miller, Otto Warmbier and Kenneth Bae.

The Supreme Court also arbitrates matters involving the non-fulfillment of contracts between state enterprises and cases involving injuries and compensation demands. These administrative decisions always reflect party policies.

The Supreme Procurator's Office routinely investigates the Supreme Court's decisions. If it finds fault with the Court's decision, it can refer it to a plenary of the Court, in which the country's chief procurator acts as a statutory member. If judges of the Supreme Court hand out "unjust sentences", they can be held liable for it.

== See also ==
- Constitution of North Korea
- Human rights in North Korea
- Judiciary of North Korea
- Law of North Korea
- Law enforcement in North Korea
- Politics of North Korea
- Supreme Court of Korea
- Constitutional Court of Korea
- Central Public Prosecutors Office of North Korea
