= Judiciary of Korea =

Judiciary of Korea may refer to

- Judiciary of South Korea, the modern judicial branch of Government of South Korea with two supreme courts.
- Judiciary of North Korea, the modern judicial branch of Government of North Korea with one supreme court.
