= 11th Cabinet of North Korea =

- State Emblem

3 September 2003 – 9 April 2009 (5 years, 218 days) Overview
- Type: Plenary Meeting of the Cabinet of North Korea
- Election: 1st Session of the 11th Supreme People's Assembly
- Secretary: Jong Mun-san

The 11th Cabinet of North Korea was elected by the 1st Session of the 11th Supreme People's Assembly of North Korea on 3 September 2003. It was replaced on 9 April 2009 by the 12th Cabinet.

== Members ==
Rank	Office	Name	Hangul	Took office	Left office	Duration	10th CAB	12th CAB
1	Premier of the Cabinet	Pak Pong-ju	박봉주	3 September 2003	11 April 2007	3 years and 220 days	Old	Not
1	Premier of the Cabinet	Kim Yong-il	김영일	11 April 2007	9 April 2009	1 year and 363 days	Old	Reelected
2	Vice Premier of the Cabinet	Kwak Pom-gi	곽범기	3 September 2003	9 April 2009	5 years and 218 days	Old	Reelected
2	Vice Premier of the Cabinet	Ro Tu-chol	로두철	3 September 2003	9 April 2009	5 years and 218 days	New	Reelected
3	Minister of Foreign Affairs	Paek Nam-sun	백남순	3 September 2003	2 January 2007	3 years and 121 days	Old	Dead
3	Minister of Foreign Affairs	Pak Ui-chun	박의춘	2 January 2007	9 April 2009	2 years and 97 days	New	Reelected
4	Minister of Public Security	Choe Ryong-su	최룡수	3 September 2003	9 April 2009	5 years and 218 days	New	Not
5	Chairman of the State Planning Commission	Kim Kwang-rin	김광린	3 September 2003	9 April 2009	5 years and 218 days	New	Not
6	Minister of Power and Coal Industries	Ju Tong-il	주통일	3 September 2003	9 April 2009	5 years and 218 days	New	Not
7	Minister of Extractive Industries	Ri Kwang-nam	리광남	3 September 2003	9 April 2009	5 years and 218 days	New	Reelected
8	Minister of Metal and Machine-Building Industries	Kim Sung-hyon	김성현	3 September 2003	9 April 2009	5 years and 218 days	New	Not
9	Minister of Electronics Industry	O Su-yong	오수용	3 September 2003	9 April 2009	5 years and 218 days	New	Reelected
10	Minister of Construction and Building-Materials Industries	Jo Yun-hui	조윤희	3 September 2003	9 April 2009	5 years and 218 days	Old	Not
11	Minister of Railways	Kim Yong-sam	김용삼	3 September 2003	9 April 2009	5 years and 218 days	Old	Not
12	Minister of Land and Marine Transport	Kim Yong-il	김영일	3 September 2003	9 April 2009	5 years and 218 days	Old	Reelected
13	Minister of Agriculture	Ri Kyong-sik	리경식	3 September 2003	9 April 2009	5 years and 218 days	New	Not
14	Minister of Chemical Industry	Ri Mu-yong	리무영	3 September 2003	9 April 2009	5 years and 218 days	New	Reelected
15	Minister of Light Industry	Ri Ju-o	리주오	3 September 2003	9 April 2009	5 years and 218 days	New	Reelected
16	Minister of Foreign Trade	Ri Kwang-gun	리광군	3 September 2003	9 April 2009	5 years and 218 days	New	Not
17	Minister of Forestry	Ri Sang-mu	리상무	3 September 2003	9 April 2009	5 years and 218 days	Old	Not
18	Minister of Fisheries	Ri Song-un	리송운	3 September 2003	9 April 2009	5 years and 218 days	Old	Not
19	Minister of City Management	Choe Jong-gon	최종곤	3 September 2003	9 April 2009	5 years and 218 days	Old	Not
20	Minister of Land and Environment Protection	Jang Il-son	장일손	3 September 2003	9 April 2009	5 years and 218 days	New	Not
21	Minister of State Construction Control	Pae Tal-jun	배달준	3 September 2003	9 April 2009	5 years and 218 days	Old	Reelected
22	Minister of Commerce	Ri Yong-son	리용손	3 September 2003	9 April 2009	5 years and 218 days	Old	Not
23	Minister of Procurement and Food Administration	Choe Nam-gyun	최남균	3 September 2003	9 April 2009	5 years and 218 days	New	Not
24	Minister of Education	Kim Yong-jin	김용진	3 September 2003	9 April 2009	5 years and 218 days	New	Reelected
25	Minister of Posts and Telecommunications	Ri Kum-bom	리금봄	3 September 2003	9 April 2009	5 years and 218 days	Old	Not
26	Minister of Culture	Choe Ik-gyu	최익규	3 September 2003	9 April 2009	5 years and 218 days	New	Not
27	Minister of Finance	Mun Il-bong	문일봉	3 September 2003	9 April 2009	5 years and 218 days	New	Not
28	Minister of Labour	Ri Won-il	리원일	3 September 2003	9 April 2009	5 years and 218 days	Old	Not
29	Minister of Public Health	Kim Su-hak	김수학	3 September 2003	9 April 2009	5 years and 218 days	Old	Not
30	Minister of State Inspection	Kim Ui-sun	김의선	3 September 2003	9 April 2009	5 years and 218 days	Old	Reelected
31	President of the Academy of Sciences	Pyon Yong-rip	변영립	3 September 2003	9 April 2009	5 years and 218 days	New	Reelected
32	Chairman of the Physical Culture and Sports Commission	Pak Myong-chol	박명철	3 September 2003	9 April 2009	5 years and 218 days	Old	Not
33	President of the Central Bank	Kim Wan-su	김완수	3 September 2003	9 April 2009	5 years and 218 days	New	Reelected
34	Director of the Central Statistic Bureau	Kim Chang-su	김창수	3 September 2003	9 April 2009	5 years and 218 days	Old	Reelected
35	Chief Secretary of the Cabinet of North Korea	Jong Mun-san	종문산	3 September 2003	9 April 2009	5 years and 218 days	Old	Not
