= Ryang Man-gil =

North Korean politician (born 1941)

- 량만길

Chairman of the Pyongyang City People's Committee
- In office 1998–2006
- Supreme Leader: Kim Jong Il
- Preceded by: ?
- Succeeded by: Pang Chol-gap

Chairman of the Pyongyang City People's Committee
- In office 2010–2012
- Supreme Leader: Kim Jong Un
- Preceded by: Pak Kwan-o
- Succeeded by: Cha Hui-rim

Personal details
- Born: April 16, 1941 (age 85) Korea, Empire of Japan
- Party: Workers' Party of Korea

Ryang Man-gil (Korean: 량만길; born on April 16, 1941) is a North Korean politician. He served as the Chairman of Pyongyang City People's Committee and as a member of the Supreme People's Assembly.

== Biography ==
Then in February 1990 the politician became the chairman of the State Planning Commission. He was a member of the Supreme People's Assembly, the North Korean unicameral parliament, in the 10th and 11th convocations (1998 to 2009).

From March 1993 to May 1994, head of the Commission for Economic Management in North Hwanghae Province. He took up a similar position in February 1996 in the capital of North Korea, Pyongyang. In September 1998, he became chairman of the People's Committee of Pyongyang for the first time. He was without interruption until June 2006, then replaced by Pang Chol-gap (방철갑). Then he became the vice-chairman of the People's Committee in Mundok County, South Pyongan Province.

Between July 2010 and 2012, Ryang Man-gil is the chairman of the Pyongyang People's Committee for the second time replacing Pak Kwan-o (박관오). He also heads the Korean Lao Friendship Society (in this role he replaced Pak Kwan-o in November 2010). During the 3rd Korean Labor Party Conference on September 28, 2010, he sat for the first time in the Central Committee of the Workers' Party of Korea.

After the death of Kim Jong Il in December 2011, Ryang Man-gil was in 107th place in the 232-person Funeral Committee.

Party political offices
Preceded by ?	Chairman of Pyongyang People's Committee; 1998-2006	Succeeded by Pang Chol-gap
Preceded by Pak Kwan-o	Chairman of Pyongyang People's Committee; 2010-September 2012	Succeeded by Cha Hui-rim
