= 10th Cabinet of North Korea =

- State Emblem

5 September 1998 – 3 September 2003 (4 years, 363 days) Overview
- Type: Plenary Meeting of the Cabinet of North Korea
- Election: 1st Session of the 6th Supreme People's Assembly
- Secretary: Jong Mun-san

The 10th Cabinet of North Korea was elected by the 1st Session of the 10th Supreme People's Assembly of North Korea on 5 September 1998. It was replaced on 3 September 2003 by the 11th Cabinet.

== Members ==
Rank	Office	Name	Hangul	Took office	Left office	Duration	9th ADC	11th CAB
1	Premier of the Cabinet	Hong Song-nam		5 September 1998	3 September 2003	4 years and 363 days	Old	Not
2	Vice Premier of the Cabinet	Jo Chang-dok		5 September 1998	3 September 2003	4 years and 363 days	Old	Not
2	Vice Premier of the Cabinet	Kwak Pom-gi		5 September 1998	3 September 2003	4 years and 363 days	Old	Reelected
3	Minister of Foreign Affairs	Paek Nam-sun		5 September 1998	3 September 2003	4 years and 363 days	Old	Not
4	Minister of Public Security	Paek Hak-rim		5 September 1998	3 September 2003	4 years and 363 days	Old	Not
5	Chairman of the State Planning Commission	Pak Nam-gi		5 September 1998	3 September 2003	4 years and 363 days	Old	Not
6	Minister of Power and Coal Industries	Sin Thae-rok		5 September 1998	3 September 2003	4 years and 363 days	Old	Not
7	Minister of Extractive Industries	Kil Song-nam		5 September 1998	3 September 2003	4 years and 363 days	Old	Not
8	Minister of Metal and Machine-Building Industries	Jon Sung-hun		5 September 1998	3 September 2003	4 years and 363 days	Old	Not
9	Minister of Construction and Building-Materials Industries	Jo Yun-hui		5 September 1998	3 September 2003	4 years and 363 days	Old	Reelected
10	Minister of Railways	Kim Yong-sam		5 September 1998	3 September 2003	4 years and 363 days	Old	Reelected
11	Minister of Land and Marine Transport	Kim Yong-il		5 September 1998	3 September 2003	4 years and 363 days	Old	Reelected
12	Minister of Agriculture	Ri Ha-sop		5 September 1998	3 September 2003	4 years and 363 days	Old	Not
13	Minister of Chemical Industry	Pak Pong-ju		5 September 1998	3 September 2003	4 years and 363 days	Old	Reelected
14	Minister of Light Industry	Ri Yon-su		5 September 1998	3 September 2003	4 years and 363 days	Old	Not
15	Minister of Foreign Trade	Kang Jong-mo		5 September 1998	3 September 2003	4 years and 363 days	Old	Not
16	Minister of Forestry	Ri Sang-mu		5 September 1998	3 September 2003	4 years and 363 days	Old	Reelected
17	Minister of Fisheries	Ri Song-un		5 September 1998	3 September 2003	4 years and 363 days	Old	Reelected
18	Minister of City Management and Land and Environment Protection	Choe Jong-gon		5 September 1998	3 September 2003	4 years and 363 days	Old	Reelected
19	Minister of State Construction Control	Pae Tal-jun		5 September 1998	3 September 2003	4 years and 363 days	Old	Reelected
20	Minister of Commerce	Ri Yong-son		5 September 1998	3 September 2003	4 years and 363 days	Old	Reelected
21	Minister of Procurement and Food Administration	Paek Chang-ryong		5 September 1998	3 September 2003	4 years and 363 days	Old	Not
22	Minister of Education	Choe Ki-ryong		5 September 1998	3 September 2003	4 years and 363 days	Old	Not
23	Minister of Posts and Telecommunications	Ri Kum-bom		5 September 1998	3 September 2003	4 years and 363 days	Old	Reelected
24	Minister of Culture	Choe Jae-hyon		5 September 1998	3 September 2003	4 years and 363 days	Old	Not
25	Minister of Finance	Rim Kyong-suk		5 September 1998	3 September 2003	4 years and 363 days	Old	Not
26	Minister of Labour	Ri Won-il		5 September 1998	3 September 2003	4 years and 363 days	Old	Reelected
27	Minister of Public Health	Kim Su-hak		5 September 1998	3 September 2003	4 years and 363 days	Old	Reelected
28	Minister of Physical Culture and Sports	Pak Myong-chol		5 September 1998	3 September 2003	4 years and 363 days	Old	Reelected
29	Minister of State Inspection	Kim Ui-sun		5 September 1998	3 September 2003	4 years and 363 days	Old	Reelected
30	President of the National Academy of Sciences	Ri Kwang-ho		5 September 1998	3 September 2003	4 years and 363 days	Old	Not
31	President of the Central Bank	Jong Song-thaek		5 September 1998	3 September 2003	4 years and 363 days	Old	Not
32	Director of the Central Statistic Bureau	Kim Chang-su		5 September 1998	3 September 2003	4 years and 363 days	Old	Reelected
33	Chief Secretary of the Cabinet of North Korea	Jong Mun-san		5 September 1998	3 September 2003	4 years and 363 days	Old	Reelected
