= Pang Chol-gap =

North Korean politician

Chairman of the Pyongyang City People's Committee
- In office 2006–2007
- Preceded by: Ryang Man-gil
- Succeeded by: Pak Kwan-o

Personal details
- Born: 1935 or 1936 (age 90–91)
- Citizenship: North Korea
- Party: Workers' Party of Korea

Korean name
- Hangul: 방철갑
- Hanja: 方鐵甲
- RR: Bang Cheolgap
- MR: Pang Ch'ŏlgap

Pang Chol-gap (Korean: 방철갑; born 1935/1936) is a North Korean politician. He served as the chairman of the Pyongyang City People's Committee in North Korea.

On 4 January 2007, in Pyongyang, Pang gave a speech at a mass rally, with other high government officials praising Songun Korea. In the speech, he also confirmed North Korea has nuclear weapons.

Political offices
Preceded by Ryang Man-gil	Chairman of Pyongyang People's Committee; 2006-2007	Succeeded by Pak Kwan-o
