= Kim Pyong-ryul =

North Korean politician (1930–2013)

President of the Supreme Court of North Korea
- In office 5 September 1998 – 8 April 2014
- Supreme Leader: Kim Jong Il; Kim Jong Un
- Succeeded by: Pak Myong-chol

Personal details
- Born: 1930 Heianhoku Province, Korea, Empire of Japan
- Died: November 5, 2013 (aged 82–83)
- Party: Workers' Party of Korea

Military service
- Allegiance: North Korea
- Branch/service: Korean People's Army
- Rank: General

Kim Pyong-ryul (Korean: 김병률; 1930 - November 5, 2013) was a politician of North Korea. President of the Supreme Court of North Korea and member of the 6th Political Bureau of the Workers' Party of Korea and served as a member of the Supreme People's Assembly and a member of its Legislative Committee.

== Biography ==
In 1930, he was born in North Pyongan Province during the Japanese occupation of Korea. Graduated from the Mangyongdae Revolutionary School and served as the escort of Kim Il Sung during the Korean War. In November 1969, he was appointed to the Pyongan Province's party secretary, and in November 1970 he was elected to the party's Central Committee. In September 1974, he served as the chairman of the People's Committee of the Pyongan Province of North Korea, and in June 1985, he also served as the secretary of the provincial party committee of Pyongan Province. In December 1986, he became a member of the Central People's Committee, the predecessor of the North Korean Cabinet.

In January 1994, he became a political member of the Supreme Guard Command, and in October 1995, became the leader of the People's Army of Korea. He was the President of the Supreme Court of North Korea from September 1998 until April 2014. In September 2010, he was elected to the Central Committee of the Workers' Party of Korea.

Starting with the 7th convocation of the Supreme People's Assembly in 1972, he served as the 7th Delegation in 1982, the 8th in 1986, the 10th in 1998, and the 11th in 2003, and the 12th in April 2009. He was also a member of the Legislative Committee (10th-12th convocations).

He was member of the funeral committees of Kim Il Sung following his death in July 1994, O Jin-u in February 1995, Pak Song-chol in October 2008, Jo Myong-rok in November 2010, and Kim Jong Il following his death 2011.
