= Kwak Chang-sik =

North Korean politician

- 곽창식

Commander of the Supreme Guard Command
- Incumbent
- Assumed office 2020
- Preceded by: Yun Jong-rin

Personal details
- Occupation: Politician

Kwak Chang-sik (Korean: 곽창식) is a North Korean politician who is serving as member of the 8th Politburo of the 8th Central Committee of the Workers' Party of Korea.

== Biography ==
In March 2019, he was elected as a delegate to the 14th Supreme People's Assembly. On April 10, 2019, at the 4th Plenary Meeting of the 7th Central Committee of the Workers' Party of Korea, he was elected as a candidate member of the Party Central Committee and was appointed as the commander of the Supreme Guard Command, succeeding Yun Jong-rin. In December 2019, he attended the 3rd enlarged meeting of the 7th Central Military Commission of the Party and the 5th Plenary Session of the 7th Central Committee of the Workers' Party of Korea, and was promoted to a full member of the Central Committee.

In August 2020, he attended the 6th Plenary Session of the 7th Central Committee of the Workers' Party of Korea. In October 2020, he led the Supreme guard command column and attended the military parade marking the 75th anniversary of the founding of the party. In January 2021, he was re-elected as a member of the Central Committee at the 8th Party Congress. In February 2021, he attended the 8th 2nd Plenary Session of the Workers' Party of Korea.

He appeared at the military parade on April 25, 2022, leading the Supreme Guard Command column. In May 2022, he served as a member of the funeral committee of Hyon Chol-hae. He appeared leading the Supreme Guard Command column at the military parade marking the anniversary of the Day of Victory in the Great Fatherland Liberation War July 27, 2023.
