= Korean law =

Korean law may refer to:

- Gyeongguk Daejeon, the Joseon Dynasty code of law
- Law of North Korea
- Law of South Korea
