= Kim Sang-ik =

North Korean general (born 1943)

Kim Sang-ik (Korean: 김상익) is a North Korean general and politician. He served in various positions in the Ministry of People's Armed Forces and served as a member of the Supreme People's Assembly, North Korea's unicameral parliament.

== Biography ==
He was born in 1943. In 1991 he was appointed to the Commander of the 3rd Corps of the Korean People's Army In June 2000 he was appointed Ministry of People's Armed Forces Railroad Forces Commander. In July 2003 he attended the dinner at the Syrian Embassy in North Korea to commemorate the 37th anniversary of the establishment of diplomatic relations between Syria and North Korea. In July 2003 he was appointed as director of the Ministry of People's Armed Forces. In September 2003 he was elected to the Supreme People's Assembly. In December of that year, at the 47th anniversary of the Cuban Revolutionary Day, he attended a banquet hosted by the Cuban Embassy. In April 2004 he participated in the banquet of the Ministry of People's Armed Forces at the 72nd anniversary of the founding of the Korean People's Army. In November 2004 he gave a speech at the ASEAN Regional Security Policy Conference in Beijing. In February 2007 On the Defender of the Fatherland Day, he attended a banquet hosted by the Russian embassy in North Korea. In October 2008 he was member of the funeral committee of Pak Song-chol.
