= Pyongyang City People's Committee =

Local government of Pyongyang, North Korea

Pyongyang City People's Committee 평양시 인민위원회

Leadership
- Chairman: Choi Hee-tae since 2020
- Elected by: Pyongyang City People's Assembly

The Pyongyang City People's Committee (Korean: 평양시 인민위원회) is the local administrative agency of Pyongyang. It is officially elected by the Pyongyang City People's Assembly and is formally responsible to the Assembly and its Standing Committee. The People's Committee is headed by a chairman, currently Choi Hee-tae. The chairman is subordinate to the secretary of the Pyongyang City Committee of the Workers' Party of Korea.

== Functions ==
The Pyongyang City People's Committee is the formal municipal government. it is subordinated to the Pyongyang WPK committee and to the Cabinet of North Korea. It deals with practical administrative matters such as:

- Urban management;
- Public services;
- Construction administration;
- Local economic administration;
- Municipal infrastructure;
- Implementation of state policies.

The Pyongyang WPK committee, however, exercises political leadership over the general direction of those activities.

== Chairpersons ==
- Kang Hee-won (Korean: 강희원 (1962 – ?)
- Kang Song-san (1969 – 1975)
- Jong Jun-gi (1977 – ?)
- Ryang Man-gil (1998 – 2006)
- Pang Chol-gap (2006 – 2007)
- Pak Kwan-o (2007 – 2010)
- Ryang Man-gil (2010 – 2012)
- Cha Hui-rim (2012 – 2020)
- Choi Hee-tae (2020 – )
