= Pyongyang City People's Assembly =

City council of Pyongyang, North Korea

Pyongyang City People's Assembly 평양시 인민위원회

Meeting place
- Pyongyang

Pyongyang City People's Assembly (Korean: 평양시인민회의; P'yŏngyang-si Inmin Hoeŭi) is the formal municipal legislature (parliament) and local state organ of power for the capital and directly-governed city of North Korea, Pyongyang. It functions as the local counterpart to the Supreme People's Assembly— the North Korean unicameral parliament which exercises legislative power and sovereignty for the entire nation. Last elections for people's assemblies took place in November 2023

== History ==
The Pyongyang City People's Assembly roots go back to the reorganization of local government following Japan's surrender and the liberation of Korea in August 1945. On 3 November 1946, elections were held for provincial, city, and county people's committees in northern Korea. Pyongyang participated as the principal political center of the emerging North Korean administration. North Korean sources continue to identify 3 November 1946 as the first major post-liberation local election and specifically record voting in Pyongyang's electoral districts.

There is evidence from archival material that the assembly has historically had standing committees dealing with particular policy areas. A 1950s Soviet diplomatic report, for example, specifically records the establishment of education and construction committees under the Pyongyang City People's Assembly.

== Functions ==
The Pyongyang City People's Assembly is the principle city council or municipal parliament. Regular meetings are convened once or twice a year to review and approve major municipal administration plans and budgets for Pyongyang. Among its functions are the following:

- Deliberation and adoption of local ordinances and policies: It deliberates on and approves Pyongyang's economic development plans and city budget, and reviews reports on their implementation.
- Formation and oversight of executive bodies: It elects or recalls the chairman, vice-chairmen, secretary-general, and members of the Pyongyang City People's Committee, which serves as the executive body overseeing the city's actual day-to-day administration.
- Legal and supervisory functions: It elects or recalls the chief judge of the Pyongyang City Court and holds the authority to revoke decisions or directives adopted by the City People's Committee that conflict with the nature or mandate of the People's Assembly.

== Structure and election ==
The Pyongyang City People's Assembly is composed of deputies elected from the various districts and counties within Pyongyang. Pyongyang contains districts (구역), and there are district people's assemblies (구역인민회의) beneath the city-level institution. Deputies serve a four-year term, and new deputies are elected through a general election. The assembly's members are called 대의원 (taeŭiwŏn), which is translated as deputies or representatives. North Korean sources portray deputies as ordinary workers and professionals representing their communities. For example, recent North Korean reporting identifies a Pyongyang trolleybus driver, Hŏ Myŏng-gŭm, as a deputy to the Pyongyang City People's Assembly; another account identifies a school principal in Sŏsŏng District as a city-assembly deputy. The North Korean political system is dominated by the Workers' Party of Korea, and the electoral process operates within that political framework.
