= Committees of the 14th Supreme People's Assembly =

North Korean government committees

14th Committees
- Sign of the Supreme People's Assembly

11 April 2019 – Incumbent (5 years, 332 days) Overview
- Type: Budget Committee; Legislation Committee; Credentials Committee
- Election: 1st Session of the 14th Supreme People's Assembly

The committees of the 14th Supreme People's Assembly (SPA) of North Korea were elected by the 1st Session of the SPA on 11 April 2019.

== Committees ==
=== Budget ===
Rank	Name	Hangul	13th COM	Positions
1	O Su-yong	오수용	Old	Chairman of the SPA Budget Committee
2	Ri Hi-yong	리히용	New	—
3	Hong So-hon	홍소혼	Old	—
4	Kim Kwang-uk	김광욱	New	—
5	Choe Yong-il	최용일	Old	—
6	Pak Hyong-ryol	박형렬	Old	—
7	Ri Kum-ok	리금옥	New	—

=== Legislation ===
Rank	Name	Hangul	13th COM	Positions
1	Choe Pu-il	최부일	Old	Chairman of the SPA Bills Committee
2	Kim Myong-gil	김명길	New	—
3	Kang Yun-sok	강윤석	New	—
4	Pak Jong-nam	박정남	New	—
5	Kim Yong-bae	김용배	New	—
6	Jong Kyong-il	종경일	New	—
7	Ho Kwang-il	호광일	New	—

=== Deputy Credentials ===
Not made public.

=== Foreign Affairs ===
Rank	Name	Hangul	13th COM	Positions
1	Ri Su-yong	리수용	Old	Chairman of the SPA Foreign Affairs Committee
2	Ri Ryong-nam	리룡남	Old	—
3	Ri Son-gwon	리선권	Old	—
4	Kim Jong-suk	김정숙	Old	—
5	Choe Son-hui	최선희	New	—
6	Kim Song-il	김성일	New	—
7	Kim Tong-son	김통손	New	—
