= Jong Ho-gyun =

North Korean general and politician (born 1940)

Personal details
- Citizenship: North Korean
- Party: Workers' Party of Korea
- Occupation: Military officer, politician

Military service
- Allegiance: North Korea
- Branch/service: Korean People's Army
- Rank: General

Jong Ho-gyun (Korean: 정호균; born 1940) is a North Korean general and politician. He served in various roles in the Korean People's Army and was a member of the Central Committee of the Workers' Party of Korea.

== Biography ==
In December 1984, he was elected as a candidate member of the Central Committee of the Workers' Party of Korea, and in June 1986 he served as commander of the 9th Corps of the Korean People's Army. In April 1992, he was promoted to army general, and in October 1994, he served as the 9th general of the People's Army. In January 1999, he was appointed commander of the People's Army Artillery Command, and in April 2010 he became the leader of the People's Army. In September 2010, he was elected a full member of the Central Committee of the Workers' Party of Korea.

He was elected delegate to the 8th, 9th, 10th and 11th convocations of the Supreme People's Assembly. At the time of the death of Jo Myong-rok in 2010 he was a member of his funeral committee.
