= Choi Hee-tae =

North Korean politician (fl. 21st century)

- 최희태

Chairman of the Pyongyang City People's Committee
- Incumbent
- Assumed office 2020
- Preceded by: Cha Hui-rim

Personal details
- Party: Workers' Party of Korea

Choi Hee-tae (Korean: 최희태) is a North Korean politician who serves as chairman of the Pyongyang City People's Committee (mayor) and candidate member of the Central Committee of the Workers' Party of Korea.

== Biography ==
His birthplace and date are unknown. He participated in the groundbreaking ceremony for the modernization of Mansudae Street on September 22, 2011, as vice chairman of the Pyongyang City People's Committee and expressed his determination to build it. He was elected as a delegate in the election of the 14th Supreme People's Assembly on March 10, 2019. He participated in the Pyongyang City Rally to Implement the Decisions of the 5th Plenary Meeting of the 7th Central Committee of the Workers' Party of Korea held at Kim Il Sung Square on January 5, 2020, as chairman of the Moranbong District People's Committee. On September 8 of the same year, he participated in the inauguration of the "Capital Party Member Division," which was formed in response to the typhoon damage in South Hamgyong Province, as chairman of the Pyongyang City People's Committee, and his appointment to the position was confirmed.

At the 8th Congress of the Workers' Party of Korea held from January 5, 2021, he was elected as a candidate member of the Central Committee.

Political offices
Preceded by Cha Hui-rim	Chairman of Pyongyang People's Committee; 2020	Incumbent
