= 2003 North Korean local elections =

Elections to provincial, municipal, city, county and district people's assemblies were held in North Korea on August 3, 2003. It was held alongside the election to the Supreme People's Assembly.

26,650 provincial, municipal, city, county and district people's assembly deputies were elected.

Voter turnout was reported as 99.9%, with candidates receiving a 100% approval rate.
