= Pak Kwan-o =

North Korean politician (born 1929)

- 박관오

Chairman of the Pyongyang City People's Committee
- In office April 2007 – July 2010
- Supreme Leader: Kim Jong-il
- Preceded by: Pang Chol-gap
- Succeeded by: Ryang Man-gil

Personal details
- Born: Korea, Empire of Japan
- Citizenship: North Korea
- Party: Workers' Party of Korea

Pak Kwan-o (Korean: 박관오; born February 1929) is a North Korean politician who served as member of the Supreme People's Assembly for number of convocations as well as Chairman of the Pyongyang City People's Committee.

== Biography ==
In August 1970 he was appointed Vice President of the Academy of Sciences of North Korea. In December 1972 he was elected to the 5th convocation of the Supreme People's Assembly. In February 1978 he was appointed National Atomic Energy Commission. In January 1981 he was appointed director of the Atomic Energy Research Institute. In February 1982 he was elected to the 7th convocation of the Supreme People's Assembly. In January 1987 he was appointed President of Kim Il-sung University. In May 1989 he was appointed as representative of the inter-Korean talks at the 13th World Youth Students Festival. In April 1990 he was elected as deputy to the 9th convocation of the Supreme People's Assembly and in May that year he was appointed member of its Bill Review Committee. In September 1998 he was elected to the 10th convocation of the Supreme People's Assembly and once again in 2003 election and in the 2009 election. In February 2004 he was dismissed from his role as President of Kim Il-sung University. In April 2007 he was appointed Chairman of the Pyongyang People's Committee, replacing Pang Chol-gap. He served in that position until July 2010, when he was replaced by Ryang Man-gil.

In April 1992 he was awarded Order of Kim Il-sung.

Party political offices
Preceded by Pang Chol-gap	Chairman of Pyongyang People's Committee; April 2007-July 2010	Succeeded by Ryang Man-gil
