= Constitution of North Korea =

Constitution of the Democratic People's Republic of Korea
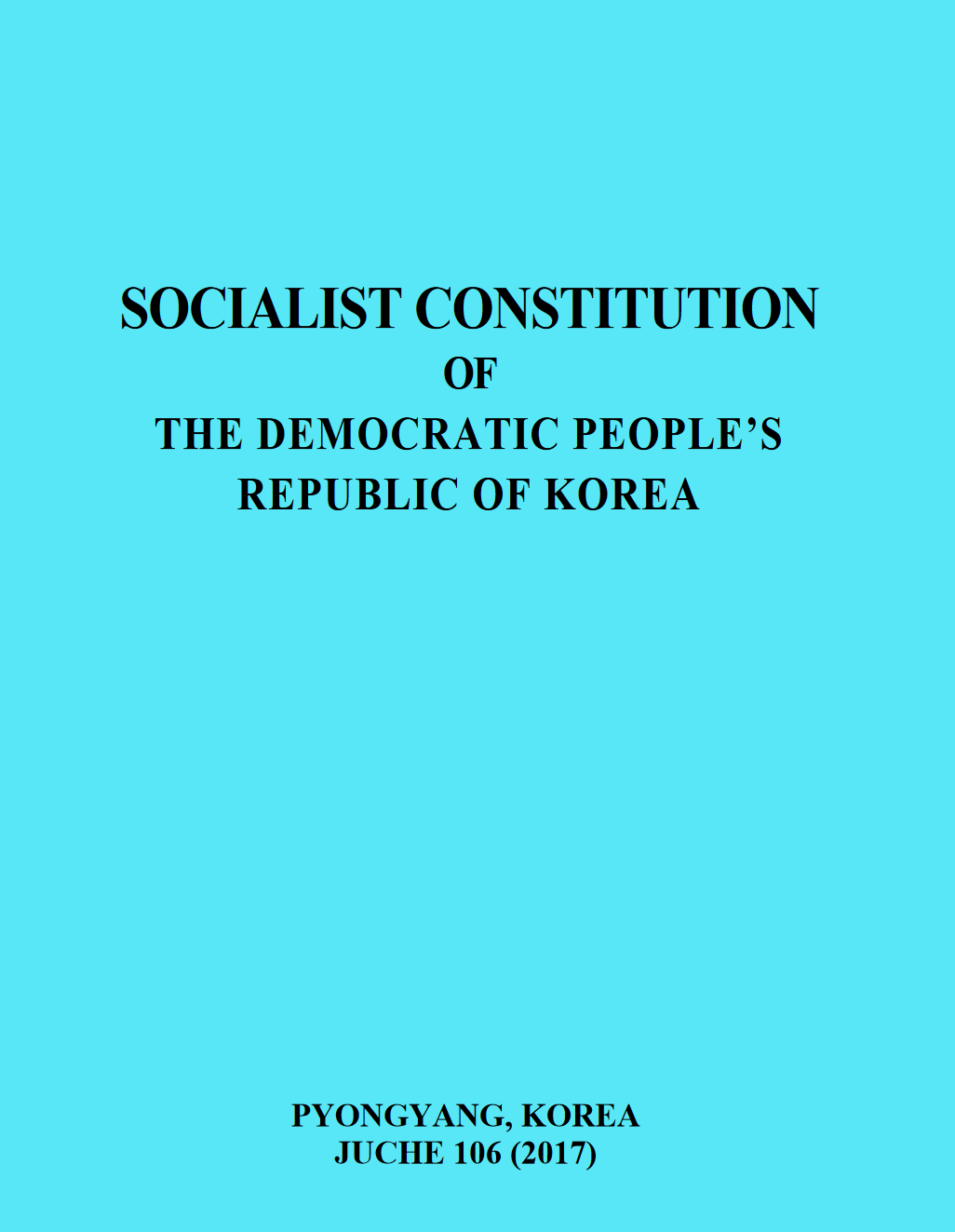

Overview
- Original title: 조선민주주의인민공화국 헌법
- Jurisdiction: DPR Korea
- Presented: 23 October 1972
- Ratified: 27 December 1972
- Date effective: 27 December 1972
- System: Unitary communist state

Government structure
- Branches: Three
- Head of state: President of the State Affairs Commission
- Chambers: Unicameral (Supreme People's Assembly)
- Executive: Premier-led Cabinet
- Judiciary: Central Court
- Electoral college: Supreme People's Assembly

History
- First legislature: 25 December 1972
- First executive: 27 December 1972
- First court: 27 December 1972
- Amendments: 13
- Last amended: 23 March 2026
- Commissioned by: Central Committee of the Workers' Party of Korea
- Signatories: Supreme People's Assembly
- Supersedes: 1948 Constitution

- Constitution of the Democratic People's Republic of Korea
- Hangul: 조선민주주의인민공화국 헌법
- Hanja: 朝鮮民主主義人民共和國憲法
- RR: Joseon minjujuui inmin gonghwaguk heonbeop
- MR: Chosŏn minjujuŭi inmin konghwaguk hŏnpŏp

The Constitution of the Democratic People's Republic of Korea is the constitution of North Korea. It was originally adopted as the Socialist Constitution of the Democratic People's Republic of Korea by the 6th Supreme People's Assembly at its first session on 27 December 1972, and has been amended and supplemented in 1992, 1998, 2009, 2010, 2012, 2013, 2016, 2019 (twice), 2023, 2024, 2025, and 2026. It replaced the country's first constitution which was approved in 1948.

The constitution consists of a preamble, seven chapters and 172 articles, which codify North Korea's ideology, basic principles of politics, economy, culture, and national defence, the basic rights and duties of citizens, organization of the central and local government, and the national symbols.

Other important documents in the country include Ten Principles for the Establishment of a Monolithic Ideological System, which establish the supreme leader-centered ideological and political system, and the Charter of the Workers Party of Korea, which are frequently seen as superseiding the constitution in practice.

== History ==
=== 1948 Constitution ===
North Korea began to draft its first constitution following the convention of the South Korean Interim Legislative Assembly on 12 December 1946 which began to draft an interim constitution for South Korea and the failure to establish a unified provisional government in Korea due to the collapse of the US-Soviet Joint Commission on 21 October 1947.

In November 1947, the People's Assembly of North Korea organized a 31-member committee to enact a provisional constitution. A draft provisional constitution was presented to the People's Assembly of North Korea in February 1948, and it was decided to submit it to an "all-people discussion" that was held from 11 February until 25 April 1948.

On 10 July 1948, the People's Assembly of North Korea adopted the draft constitution as the Constitution of the Democratic People's Republic of Korea, which was implemented by the Supreme People's Assembly throughout the Korean peninsula on 8 September 1948.

According to Andrei Lankov, the 1948 constitution was personally edited by Joseph Stalin alongside Terentii Shtykov, the head of the Soviet occupation of North Korea, in Moscow, with some of its articles being rewritten later by Soviet supervisors.

The 1948 constitution consisted of 10 chapters and 104 articles. It codified the reforms being implemented in North Korea since the establishment the Provisional People's Committee of North Korea in 1946, such as land reforms, the nationalization of industries and resources, and the provision of various freedoms and rights to Koreans.

The constitution instituted the Supreme People's Assembly as the highest government institution in North Korea with various powers such as the passing of laws and the election of the Cabinet, the Supreme Court and the Procurator General. The Standing Committee of the Supreme People's Assembly was tasked with exercising the powers of the assembly during its recess, as well as to represent the country in its foreign relations. The Cabinet was instituted to be the highest executive institution, with its Premier being designated as head of government.

The 1948 constitution was amended five times in April 1954, October 1954, 1955, 1956 and 1962.

=== 1972 Constitution ===
North Korea began drafting the present Socialist Constitution as there was a need to set into law the expanding socialist policies and the political, economic and social changes in the country, which are no longer being reflected in the 1948 constitution.

The need for a new constitution had been discussed since the mid-1960s. In the 1970s, the creation of a new constitution was made into an urgent matter.

On 23 October 1972, a committee to draft the Socialist Constitution was organized during the 5th plenary meeting of the 5th convocation of the Central Committee of the Workers' Party of Korea. Kim Il Sung said in a report during the meeting that there was a need to codify the "socialist revolution and construction" and their achievements in the constitution.

The Socialist Constitution of the Democratic People's Republic of Korea was adopted at the 1st session of the 5th Supreme People's Assembly on 27 December 1972, the same date that South Korea enacted the Yushin Constitution, a similarly autocratic document providing legal endorsement for a pre-existing dictatorship.

The Socialist Constitution of the Democratic People's Republic of Korea has been amended thirteen times: in 1992, 1998, 2009, 2010, 2012, 2013, 2016, April 2019, August 2019, 2023, 2024, 2025, and 2026. The Socialist Constitution was renamed to the Constitution of the Democratic People's Republic of Korea in the 2026 amendment.

== Structure ==
The Constitution of the Democratic People's Republic of Korea consists of a preamble and 172 articles organized into seven chapters as of 11 April 2019. The constitution is considered as unique for combining strong socialist and nationalist tendencies as well as referencing the country's Juche ideology.

=== Preamble ===
The preamble describes North Korea, which has the official name of the Democratic People's Republic of Korea, as a "people-centered socialist state" that "represents the interests of the Korean people and struggles for the socialist cause".

It states that North Korea "proceeds by firmly grasping the strengthening of the people's government and the enhancement of its functions and roles, while thoroughly carrying out the three revolutions of ideology, technology, and culture, as the general line of socialist construction".

Kim Il Sung is credited as the "founder of the Democratic People's Republic of Korea and father of socialist Korea" who founded the Juche idea and turned North Korea into a socialist country. Kim Jong Il is credited as the "peerless patriot and defender of socialist Korea" who had kept Kim Il Sung's policies and turned North Korea into a politico-ideological power, a nuclear state and a military power through Songun politics.

Kim Il Sung and Kim Jong Il were described by the preamble to have always worked for the people under their motto of "the people are heaven" (이민위천) and are credited for making North Korea as a unique country in the world for accomplishing the tasks for building a prosperous and independent state. The preamble also praises both leaders as "veteran world statesmen" for developing North Korea's foreign relations.

The preamble states that Kim Il Sung and Kim Jong Il's ideas and achievements are "lasting treasures of the Korean revolution" and the basic guarantee for North Korea's prosperity, while setting up the Kumsusan Palace of the Sun as a monument to the leaders' immortality and a national symbol for Korea.

The preamble concludes by enshrining Kim Il Sung and Kim Jong Il as the eternal leaders of North Korea, and that the constitution would consist of their ideas and achievements which makes it the Kim Il Sung-Kim Jong Il Constitution.

=== Chapter 1 – Politics ===
Chapter 1 of the Constitution consists of 18 articles that outline the political structure of North Korea.

Article 1 states that the country's official name is the Democratic People's Republic of Korea.

Article 2 states that the DPRK's territory "includes the territory bordering the People's Republic of China and the Russian Federation to the north, and the Republic of Korea to the south, as well as the territorial seas and airspace established thereon."

Article 3 makes Kimilsungism-Kimjongilism as the country's guide for its activities, while Article 11 makes the Workers' Party of Korea lead all of the country's activities.

Article 4 gives the sovereignty of the country to the working people consisting of workers, peasants, soldiers and talented personnel who exercise it through their representatives in the Supreme People's Assembly and local people's assemblies organized in the nation's administrative divisions. Article 6 and 7 states that these representatives are elected by the people based on universal, equal and direct suffrage, and are responsible to them.

Article 5 states that government institutions are created and operated based on democratic centralism.

Article 8 provides a "people-centered" social system for North Korea that turns "workers into masters of everything" and "everything in society serve the workers," and tasks the state to respect and defend the people's human rights.

Article 9 provides North Korea with the task to achieve "the complete victory of socialism" in the northern half of Korea.

Article 10 states that North Korea is based on the "political and ideological unity" of the people who are in a working class-led worker-peasant alliance, and that the people will be revolutionized and assimilated by the state into a single united society. Article 12 adds that the North Korean state will "adhere to the class line" and "defend the people's power and the socialist system" from "hostile elements" through the "dictatorship of people's democracy".

Article 13 states that North Korea will resolve the country's issues by finding solutions from the masses through the revolutionary work system, while Article 14 institutionalizes mass movements such as the Three-Revolution Red Flag movement to push socialist construction in the country.

Article 15 provides representation for overseas Koreans by North Korea, and Article 16 guarantees that the interests of foreigners within North Korea are guaranteed by the state.

Article 17 establishes the principles of independence, peace and friendship as the basis for North Korea's foreign relations, and declares that the country will support foreign struggles for independence and liberation.

Article 18 states that the laws of North Korea are the "reflection of the wishes and interests" of the people, and that it should be observed by every institution, enterprise, organization and person in the country. The state is tasked with perfecting the socialist law system and strengthening the socialist law-abiding life.

=== Chapter 2 – Economy ===
Chapter 2 of the Constitution consists of 19 articles that outline the economic structure of North Korea.

Article 19 states that North Korea relies on the socialist relations of production and the foundation of an independent national economy.

Articles 20 to 23 states that the means of production are owned by the state and social cooperatives, and lists provisions for state and social cooperative properties.

Article 24 allows for citizens to have private property, which the state shall protect and guarantee its inheritance.

Article 25 states that North Korea shall continually increase the living standards of its people who shall be provided by the state with food, clothing and housing.

Article 26 states that North Korea has an independent national economy in which Article 27 states that science and technology will have a leading role.

Article 30 provides for an eight-hour work day for workers which the state will fully utilize, while Article 31 prohibits work for those who are below 16 years old.

Article 33 states that the North Korean economy will be managed by the producer masses under the Cabinet based on the "socialist system of responsible business management" and on economic levers such as cost, price and profit.

Article 34 states that North Korea has a planned economy which the state shall develop based on socialist principles. Article 35 provides a requirement for a state budget based on North Korea's plans for economic development.

Article 36 states that foreign trade in North Korea is conducted by state institutions, state enterprises and social cooperatives with the objective of maintaining credibility in foreign trade, improving trade structure and developing trade relations with foreign countries. Article 37 encourages joint ventures with foreign corporations and individuals and the creation of businesses in special economic zones. Article 38 establishes a tariff policy to protect the North Korean economy.

=== Chapter 3 – Culture ===
Chapter 3 of the Constitution consists of 18 articles that outline the cultural structure of North Korea.

Article 39 states that North Korea has a socialist culture, which in Article 40 states to be training the people into builders of socialism. Article 41 provides that this socialist culture is popular and revolutionary.

Article 44 provides for public education, cadre training, technological education and education in work. Article 45 provides for a universal compulsory 12-year education, with Article 46 providing scientific and technical training. Articles 47, 48 and 49 provides for free education, allowances for university and college students, social education, conditions for study to all workers and nurseries and kindergartens for preschool children from the state.

Articles 50 and 51 emphasizes that North Korea should develop its science and technology.

Article 52 states that North Korea has a Juche-oriented, revolutionary art and literature that has nationalist form and socialist content that allows for the production of ideological and artistic works and the broad participation of the masses in literary and artistic activities.

Article 53 requires the state to provide cultural facilities for the people for their mental and physical improvement.

Article 54 requires the state to protect and develop the national language.

Article 55 requires the state to prepare the people for work and national defense through sports. Article 56 provides the people with access to free healthcare to protect their health, while Article 57 provides them with access to hygienic living and working conditions through environmental protection efforts by the state.

=== Chapter 4 – National Defense ===
Chapter 4 of the Constitution consists of four articles that outline the national defense structure of North Korea.

Article 58 states that North Korea has an all-people and nationwide national defense system.

Article 59 lists the mission of the North Korean armed forces as to defend the Central Committee of the Workers' Party of Korea headed by Kim Jong Un, as well as the interests of the working people, the socialist system, the gains of the revolution and the freedom, peace and independence of the country from foreign aggression.

Article 60 states that North Korea's defense is based on the line of self-reliant defense, with Article 61 requires the state to establish a revolutionary command system and military climate, strengthen military discipline and maintain military traditions.

=== Chapter 5 – Fundamental Rights and Duties of Citizens ===
Chapter 5 of the Constitution consists of 24 articles that list the rights and duties of citizens(gongmin) in North Korea.

Article 62 states that North Korean citizenship is regulated by a nationality law.

Article 63 states that the rights and duties of North Korean citizens are based on the collectivist principle of "one for all and all for one", with Article 64 guaranteeing the rights and well-being of citizens as well as expanding their rights and freedom based on the consolidation and development of the socialist system.

Article 65 provides that all North Korean citizens have equal rights. Citizens have the right to elect and be elected (Article 66), freedom of speech, the press, assembly, demonstration and association (Article 67), freedom of religious belief (Article 68), right to submit complaints and petitions (Article 69), right to work (Article 70), right to relaxation (Article 71), right to free medical care (Article 72), right to free education (Article 73), freedom in scientific, literary and artistic pursuits (Article 74), freedom of residence and travel (Article 75) and inviolability of the person and home and privacy of correspondence (Article 79).

Article 76 provides special protection from the state and society to revolutionary fighters and their veterans, families of revolutionary and patriotic martyrs, families of Korean People's Army active duty and reserve personnel, veterans of the KPA, and service personnel of the KPA who have been disabled in the performance of their duty.

Article 77 provides women with the same social status and rights as men, as well as special protection for mothers and children.

Article 78 provides state protection for marriages and families.

Article 80 provides foreigners fighting for peace, democracy, independence, socialism and freedom of scientific and cultural pursuits with the right to seek asylum in North Korea.

Citizens have the duty to defend "the political and ideological unity and solidarity of the people" and to work for the good of society and the people (Article 81), observe state laws and the socialist standards of life and defend the honour and dignity of being North Korean citizens (Article 82), participate in work and observe work discipline and working hours (Article 83), take care of state and social cooperative properties and manage the national economy (Article 84), increase their revolutionary vigilance and fight for state security (Article 85) and to defend the country and serve in the armed forces (Article 86).

=== Chapter 6 – State Organization ===
Chapter 6 of the Constitution consists of 80 articles organized into eight sections that outline the organization of the government of North Korea.

Section 1 describes the President of the SAC-DPRK as the head of state and the commander-in-chief of the armed forces. The President directs overall state affairs, appoint or remove important state officials, ratify or rescind major treaties with foreign countries, grant special pardons, proclaim a state of emergency, a state of war and mobilization order, organize the National Defense Committee in wartime, institute and confer decorations, medals and honors in the name of the Republic and issue orders. He also holds veto power over legislative acts, decisions, and directives approved into law by the Supreme People's Assembly or its Standing Committee.

Section 2 describes the Supreme People's Assembly as the highest institution of state power that exercises legislative power. It consists of deputies elected through universal, equal and direct suffrage through secret ballot for a five-year term. It has the power to amend the constitution, adopt or amend laws, elect or recall the President of the State Affairs Commission, the members of the State Affairs Commission, the Chairman of the Standing Committee of the Supreme People's Assembly, the members of the Standing Committee of the Supreme People's Assembly, the Premier, the members of the Cabinet, the Prosecutor General of the Supreme Public Prosecutors Office, the President and Chief Justice of the Supreme Court, approve the state plan for national economic development, approve the national budget, and ratify or annul treaties presented to it.

Section 3 describes the State Affairs Commission as the supreme policy-oriented leadership institution consisting of the President, vice-presidents and members. The commission decides on important state policies, issue decisions and directives, and supervise the fulfillment of the orders of the president of the Commission and the SAC decisions and directives.

Section 4 describes the Standing Committee of the Supreme People's Assembly as the highest institution of state power when the Supreme People's Assembly is in recess. The SC-SPA consists of the Chairman of the Standing Committee, vice-chairmen of the committee, members assigned from among deputies of the Assembly, and the standing committee's secretary general. It has the power to exercise the national legislative power in the absence of the main Supreme People's Assembly, convene sessions of the SPA, interpret the constitution, supervise the observance of legislative acts passed either by the whole SPA or by itself, organize elections, appoint or remove members of the Cabinet and judges and people's assessors of the Supreme Court, approve or nullify treaties, refer to the President of the SAC on any decisions on the appointment and recall of diplomatic representatives to the Republic, and grant general amnesty. The Chairman of the Standing Committee of the SPA is tasked to receive the credentials and letters of recall of foreign diplomatic representatives to the Republic upon full consent of the office of the presidency of the SAC.

Section 5 describes the Cabinet as the administrative and executive institutions of state power responsible for overall state management. It is headed by the Premier, and consists of the first vice premier, vice-premiers, chairmen, ministers and other required members. It is responsible for implementing state policies, drafting the state plan for national economic development and compiling the national budget. The Cabinet and its composition is appointed and relieved by the SPA and/or its Standing Committee, the Premier can be additionally relieved by the President of the SAC.

Section 6 describes the local people's assemblies as the local organs of state power in provinces, municipalities, cities, district and counties and provide limited legislative power to the aformentioned especially in regards to local policies, while Section 7 describes the local people's committees as local organs of state power when the local people's assemblies are not in session and as local administrative and executive institutions of state power, whose leaders are assigned from within the LPAs. The Chairman of a regional or local LPC is appointed and relieved from his or her post by the LPAs and serves as the local chief executive of the level of administrative division of his/her supervision.

Section 8 provides the power of investigation and prosecution to provincial and local level public prosecutors offices under the Supreme Public Prosecutors Office, and the judicial power to the regional level courts under the Supreme Court's supervision.

=== Chapter 7 – Emblem, Flag, Anthem and Capital ===
Chapter 7 of the Constitution consists of four articles that designate the national symbols of North Korea.

Article 169 provides descriptions for the national emblem, while Article 170 provides descriptions for the national flag.

Article 171 states that "Aegukka" as the national anthem.

Article 172 states that Pyongyang is the national capital.

== Amendments ==
According to Chapter 6, Section 1, Article 97 of the Constitution of the Democratic People's Republic of Korea, the constitution can be amended through the approval of more than two-thirds of the total number of deputies in the Supreme People's Assembly.

Since its adoption in 1972, the Constitution has been amended thirteen times in 1992, 1998, 2009, 2010, 2012, 2013, 2016, twice in 2019, 2023, 2024, 2025 and 2026. Amendments to the North Korean constitution are usually considered as an entirely new constitution due to the extent of the changes made to the original document.

=== 1992 amendment ===
The Socialist Constitution of the Democratic People's Republic of Korea was first amended at the 3rd session of the 9th Supreme People's Assembly on 9 April 1992.

The amendment solidified Kim Jong Il's position as the successor to Kim Il Sung by making the National Defence Commission a separate institution from the Central People's Committee. It also no longer made the President the supreme commander of the armed forces and the chairman of the National Defense Commission. This made the chairman of the National Defense Commission the highest military authority. These provisions allowed for Kim Jong Il to assume the positions of supreme commander of the Korean People's Army on 24 December 1991 and chairman of the National Defense Commission on 9 April 1993.

The amendment's introduction was also a response to the Revolutions of 1989 in Eastern Europe and the dissolution of the Soviet Union. It removed mentions of Marxism–Leninism in the constitution, and constitutionalized the philosophical principle of Juche with the Workers' Party of Korea being stated to have a leading role in the country's activities. It also removed the foreign policy clause of international cooperation with socialist states and adopted independence, peace and solidarity as the basis for North Korea's foreign policy.

The amendment hinted at co-existence between North Korea and South Korea by changing its stance of revolutionary unification into peaceful unification.

The amendment also introduced economic provisions aimed at emphasizing an independent national economy and developing science and technology. It also introduced provisions for joint ventures between the country's institutions, enterprises and organizations and foreign corporations and individuals.

The amendment revised the national emblem to include Mount Paektu, and recognized Aegukka as the national anthem.

=== 1998 amendment ===
The Socialist Constitution was amended for the second time at the 1st session of the 10th Supreme People's Assembly on 5 September 1998.

The amendment was approved to introduce changes to North Korea's government system following the death of Kim Il-Sung in 1994.

The amendment included a preamble that enshrined Kim Il Sung as the eternal President and named the constitution as the "Kim Il-sung Constitution" that is based on the former leader's ideas and achievements. It also abolished the office of the President and the Central People's Committee with the President's powers as head of state being transferred to the Presidium of the Supreme People's Assembly (with the President of the Presidium of the Supreme People's Assembly being designated as head of state) while the President's powers on state administration being transferred to the Cabinet.

The amendment expanded the authority of the National Defense Commission to include general control of national defense.

The amendment also attempted to address North Korea's economic difficulties by introducing provisions on the reduction of objects that can be owned by the state, the expansion of social cooperative properties and private properties, the legalization of citizens earning income through legal economic activities, the recognition of cost, price and profit as basis of economic management, and the establishment of special economic zones.

=== 2009 amendment ===
The Socialist Constitution was amended for the third time at the 1st session of the 12th Supreme People's Assembly on 9 April 2009.

The amendment was seen as an attempt to cement Kim Jong Il's position as concerns were raised following his suffering of a stroke in August 2008. It designated the chairman of the National Defense Commission as the supreme leader of North Korea and was expanded his powers to guide overall state affairs. It also designated the military to defend the "headquarters of the revolution".

The amendment removed any mention of communism in the constitution and recognized North Korea as a socialist state that is also guided by Kim Jong Il's policy of Songun alongside Juche.

=== 2010 amendment ===
The Socialist Constitution was amended for the fourth time at the 2nd session of the 12th Supreme People's Assembly on 9 April 2010.

The amendment renamed the Central Court as the Supreme Court and the Central Public Prosecutors Office as the Supreme Public Prosecutors Office.

=== 2012 amendment ===
The Socialist Constitution was amended for the fifth time at the 5th session of the 12th Supreme People's Assembly on 13 April 2012. The amendment was approved to introduce changes to North Korea's government system following the death of Kim Jong-il in 2011.

The preamble was revised to include Kim Jong Il, who was credited with defending Kim Il Sung's policies and turned North Korea into a politico-ideological power, a nuclear state and a military power through Songun politics. It enshrined Kim Jong Il as the eternal Chairman of the National Defense Commission and also recognized that his ideas and achievements were also the basis for the constitution which is now known as the Kim Il Sung-Kim Jong Il Constitution.

The position of Chairman of the National Defense Commission was replaced with the First Chairman of the National Defense Commission.

=== 2013 amendment ===
The Socialist Constitution was amended for the sixth time at the 7th session of the 12th Supreme People's Assembly on 1 April 2013.

The preamble was revised to include the Kumsusan Palace of the Sun, which has been designated as a monument to the immortality of Kim Il Sung and Kim Jong Il and a national symbol for Korea.

Compulsory education was revised from 10 years to 12 years following the approval of the law on extending North Korea's compulsory education at the 6th session of the 12th Supreme People's Assembly on 25 September 2012.

=== 2016 amendment ===
The Socialist Constitution was amended for the seventh time at the 4th session of the 13th Supreme People's Assembly on 29 June 2016.

The preamble was revised to enshrine Kim Il Sung and Kim Jong Il as the eternal leaders of Juche Korea.

The First Chairman of the National Defense Commission was replaced with the President of the State Affairs Commission, while the National Defense Commission was replaced with the State Affairs Commission which is designated as the supreme policy-oriented leadership body of the Republic, with its duties now expanded to cover other matters of national concern, making it a de facto successor to the Central People's Committee.

The Supreme Court was renamed as the Central Court, while the Supreme Public Prosecutors Office was renamed as the Central Public Prosecutors Office.

=== 2019 amendments ===
The Socialist Constitution was amended for the eighth and ninth times, respectively, at the 1st and 2nd plenary sessions of the 14th Supreme People's Assembly on 11 April and 29 August 2019.

The President of the State Affairs Commission was designated as the head of state, cannot stand as a candidate for election as a deputy to the SPA, and is elected and relieved by a majority vote in its plenary sessions. The Chairman of the Standing Committee of the Supreme People's Assembly is still tasked to receive the credentials and letters of recall of foreign diplomatic representatives to the Republic (and thus, remains the head of state from the point of view of international diplomatic custom), with the President of the SAC now having the responsibility to appoint and relieve these diplomats. The orders of the President of the SAC were made superior to the ordinances of the Supreme People's Assembly save for more important ordinances which the President may now enact, alongside the decrees and decisions made by the State Affairs Commission.

National defense is no longer emphasized on the role of the State Affairs Commission.

Intellectuals are no longer referred in Korean as 근로인테리 kŭllo int'eri (or working intellectuals) but as 지식인 chisigin (or talented personnel).

The Chongsanri spirit and the Chongsanri method were replaced with the revolutionary work method as the principle for North Korea's activities.

The Cabinet is given a leading role in economic management.

The Taean work system of economic management is replaced with the socialist system of responsible business operation.

Provisions on foreign trade were expanded to include the maintenance of foreign trade credibility, the improvement of trade structure and the expansion of foreign trade relations.

The defense of the Party Central Committee headed by Kim Jong Un was included in the mission of the Korean People's Army and its reserve organizations.

=== 2023 amendment ===
In September 2023, the SAC unanimously adopted a new amendment to enshrine the country's ongoing nuclear program into its constitution, citing the program and right as a deterrent against United States provocation.

=== 2024 amendment ===
In October 2024, the Socialist Constitution was amended by the 11th Session of the 14th Supreme People's Assembly. The official report published by the Korean Central News Agency mentioned changes to voting and working ages. Later on October 17, the state media mentioned a constitutional provision that identifies the Republic of Korea as a "hostile state", in line with a statement made by Kim Jong Un on the WPK Central Committee Plenary Session of abandoning peaceful reunification and regarding South Korea as a foreign and hostile state.

=== 2025 amendment ===
In January 2025, the Socialist Constitution was amended by the 12th Session of the 14th Supreme People's Assembly. The official report announced renaming of the Central Court to the Supreme Court, and the Central Public Prosecutor's Office to the Supreme Public Prosecutor's Office.

The full text of the constitution amended by laws of October 2024 and January 2025 are yet to be made available to foreign observers, as of January 24, 2025.

=== 2026 amendment ===
On 23 March 2026, the Constitution was amended by the first session of the 15th Supreme People's Assembly. The official report announced dropping the word "Socialist" from the name of the Constitution.

The preamble was changed from describing North Korea as the "socialist state of Juche" that applies the ideas and achievements of Kim Il Sung and Kim Jong Il on state construction to describing it as a "people-centered socialist state" that "represents the interests of the Korean people and struggles for the socialist cause". With Kim Jong Un's consolidated presidential powers, the country effectively turned itself into a presidential system shedding the remaining elements of orthodox socialist system from its constitution.

In Article 1, the line "the Democratic People's Republic of Korea is an independent socialist state representing the interests of the entire Korean people" was changed to "The name of our country is the Democratic People's Republic of Korea". A territorial clause was added to the new Article 2.

Article 9 of the previous constitution, which emphasized North Korea's commitment to "achieve the complete victory of socialism in the northern half of Korea" and carry out an ideological, technological, and cultural revolution with a long-term goal of reunification of the entire Korean peninsula under principles of independence, peace, and national unity has been removed from the revised constitution. Although the new constitution continues to define North Korea as a socialist state and retains the constitutional entrenchment of state ideology throughout its provisions, it removes all mentions to the reunification of the Korean Peninsula.

On 6 May 2026, Ministry of Unification of South Korea released the full text of North Korea's latest constitution. As the first publicly available version since the constitutional revision of September 2023, the document reflects not only the 2023 amendments but also three subsequent rounds of constitutional revisions.

The revised constitution codifies the continued consolidation of Kim Jong Un's constitutional authority following the Eighth Congress of the Workers' Party of Korea in 2021. A notable institutional change appears in Chapter 6 ("State Organs"), which now places the office of the President of the State Affairs Commission before the Supreme People's Assembly. This departs from the ordering adopted in previous constitutions, in which the SPA—the constitutionally designated supreme organ of state power—preceded the SAC chairman. The revised arrangement reflects the enhanced constitutional status accorded to the office held by Kim Jong Un.

The constitution further redesignates the President of the State Affairs Commission as the "head of state," replacing the previous designation of "supreme leader." Article 90 correspondingly expands the President's constitutional authority by empowering the office to require the resignation of deputies to the Supreme People's Assembly; veto laws, decrees, decisions, and directives adopted by the SPA or its Standing Committee; confer state decorations and honors; receive the credentials of foreign diplomatic representatives; and appoint or dismiss senior state officials—including the chairman of the Supreme People's Assembly and the premier of the Cabinet—during periods when the SPA is not in session.

== See also ==
- Charter of the Workers' Party of Korea
- Law of North Korea
- National symbols of North Korea
- Socialist law
- Ten Principles for the Establishment of a Monolithic Ideological System
