= Yun Jong-rin =

North Korean general and politician (born 1938)

- Supreme Leader: Kim Jong Il; Kim Jong Un

Personal details
- Born: 1938 (age 87–88) Korea, Empire of Japan
- Citizenship: North Korean
- Party: Workers' Party of Korea

Military service
- Allegiance: North Korea
- Branch/service: Korean People's Army
- Rank: General

- Yun Jong-rin
- Hangul: 윤정린
- Hanja: 尹正麟
- RR: Yun Jeongrin
- MR: Yun Chŏngnin

Yun Jong-rin (Korean: 윤정린; born 1938) is a general of the Korean People's Army Ground Force. From 2010 until 2019, he served as the commander of North Korea's Supreme Guard Command, when he was replaced by Kwak Chang-sik. The force is responsible for the personal protection of the ruling Kim family.

He is also a member of the Workers' Party of Korea and its Central Military Commission.
