= Pang Hak-se =

North Korean politician

Minister of Interior
- In office October 1952 – November 1960
- Premier: Kim Il Sung
- Preceded by: Pak Il-u
- Succeeded by: Sok San

President of the Central Court
- In office 28 December 1972 – 18 July 1992
- Preceded by: Ri Yong-gu
- Succeeded by: Choe Won-ik

Personal details
- Born: 1914 Keishōhoku Prefecture, Korea, Empire of Japan
- Died: 18 July 1992 (aged 77–78) Pyongyang, North Korea
- Party: Workers' Party of Korea

Pang Hak-se (Korean: 방학세; Hanja: 方學世; 1914 – 18 July 1992) was a politician from North Korea. After the formal establishment of North Korea, he held various positions in the North Korean government, including member of the Supreme People's Assembly, the country's unicameral parliament, the Central Committee of the Workers' Party of Korea and later served as the President of the Central Court. He was general manager of the South Koreans abducted during the Korean War.

== Biography ==
He was either born in 1912, 1913 or 1914 depending on the source. He received professional training in the Soviet Union and worked for the People's Commissariat of Internal Affairs and intelligence agencies. After World War II, he was sent to Korea in October 1945 as a Soviet army captain. From May 1947 Director-General of the People's Committee of North Korea Interior Affairs Bureau.

=== North Korea ===
In September 1948, with the declaration on establishment and conducting of first parliamentary election to the Supreme People's Assembly, he was elected as a member of parliament and was appointed Deputy Minister of Internal Affairs and Director of the Political Security Bureau in the Cabinet of North Korea which was led by Premier Kim Il Sung. From March 1951 he served as Minister of Social Security and from October 1952 as Minister of Interior. He continued to support Kim Il Sung after the August Faction Incident, and while most of the Soviet rebels were "returning home" to the Soviet Union, he became one of the few who maintained that position.

He then turned to the legal profession, and was deputy director of the Central Court in November 1960. Since November 1966, he has also been the Information Director of the Workers' Party Liaison Bureau. He was appointed president of the Central Court on 28 December 1972, and was reappointed in April 1982 and December 1986 serving in that position until his death in 1992. During the re-election in 1982, he was awarded the Order of Kim Il Sung, and in March 1984, received the Hero of Labor (North Korea). He died on July 18, 1992 while in charge of the Central Court. Pak Song-chol was the chairman of the funeral committee.

In April 1956, November 1970 and October 1980, he was elected as member of the 3rd, 5th and 6th Central Committee of the Workers' Party of Korea.

== Bibliography ==
- Tertitskiy, Fyodor (June 14, 2024). "Pang Hak-se: The founding father of the North Korean secret police". The Forgotten Political Elites of North Korea: Woe to the Vanquished. Abingdon-on-Thames: Routledge. pp. 82–99. ISBN 9781032745473.
- Suh, Dae-Sook (1981). Korean Communism, 1945–1980: A Reference Guide to the Political System. Honolulu: The University Press of Hawaii. ISBN 978-0-8248-0740-5.
