= Supreme Guard Command =

Personal bodyguard force of North Korea's ruling Kim family

- Active: 1946–present
- Country: North Korea
- Allegiance: Kim Jong Un
- Branch: Korean People's Army Ground Force
- Type: Protective security unit
- Size: 95,000-120,000 (Corps)
- Headquarters: Pyongyang
- Nicknames: Unit 963; Escort Bureau; Guard Command; Guard Bureau; General Guard Bureau
- Patron: Commander-in-Chief of the Armed Forces of North Korea
- March: Song of the Korean People's Army
- Engagements: Korean War

Commanders
- Commander: Major General Ra Chol-jin
- Notable commanders: Marshal Ri Ul-sol

The Supreme Guard Command (Korean: 호위사령부; Hanja: 護衛司令部) (also known as Unit 963, the Escort Bureau, Guard Command, Bodyguard Command, Guard Bureau and the General Guard Bureau) is a protective security unit of the Korean People's Army tasked with the protection of North Korea's ruling Kim family, senior Workers' Party of Korea (WPK) officials, and other domestic VIPs, reporting directly to the Supreme Leader. Active since 1946, the unit's activities are overseen by Office 80 of the WPK Politburo's Organization and Guidance Department. The current Supreme Guard commander is General Kwak Chang-sik.

== Naming ==
North Korea's ruling family are claimed to be superstitious and so the Command's designation number is in reference to the numerological construct "9 and 6+3=9" (double nine), the number "9" being considered lucky.

== History ==
According to official history, the Command participated in the Korean War (known in North Korea as the "Fatherland Liberation War"). The unit has also produced 72 "heroes of labor" and 28 "heroes of the Republic". The first incarnation of the Command was created in 1946. Between the 1970s to the 1990s the Command was part of the State Security Department. However, to deal with several coup attempts, Kim Jong Il reorganized the Guard by dismissing dozens of officers and expanding his own private bodyguard unit by 200 men and named it the "2.16 Unit" after his birthday of February 16. On April 27, 2018, the SGC was deployed to protect Kim Jong Un during his visit to Panmunjon.

== Organization ==
The Command falls under the Korean People's Army Ground Force and is divided into approximately six departments, three combat brigades, several bodyguard divisions, and one construction battalion. The unit is composed of 95,000-120,000 personnel. Bodyguard divisions have been divided into a total of three separate units; Section 1 was dedicated to the protection of Kim Il Sung and Section 2, the '2.16' unit, protected Kim Jong Il. Unit 974 is the SGC unit currently responsible for the protection of Kim Jong Un.

The Command has camps located throughout the country, usually near official residences, and has a strong presence in Pyongyang where its headquarters are located. The Command also monitors key military and party figures to ensure the safety of the Kim family. It also coordinates with the Pyongyang Defense Command (with its 70,000 men) and the III Corps for the defense of the capital and other strategic locations. These other military units provide an additional 95,000-100,000 soldiers, plus artillery and armored vehicles, for the defense of the country's leadership.

=== Recruitment and training ===
According to the testimonies of North Korean defector Lee Young-kuk, recruiters for the Guard look for new recruits in high schools where students are lined up for inspection. Physical prerequisites include no facial scars, good height and a well-proportioned body. Potential candidates have their family histories scrutinized for party loyalty and good "songbun". Once chosen, they are given an ID number while all other records are erased; contact with family is forbidden. Only one member per family is allowed to serve as a bodyguard. The recruits are selected from high schools in provinces, counties and cities across the DPRK, primarily the so-called "No.1 Schools", and those who are the children of workers, farmers, and KPA soldiers are preferred, especially ones living in rural communities. Contact with family members is not allowed for at least 12–13 years. Recruits are then taken to special training camps for six months and are trained for a total of two years. Training includes Taekwondo classes, marksmanship, 25 km marches in full gear and special operations tactics. According to defector Oh Young-nam, a former member of the State Security Department, the Supreme Guard Command published a 300-page training book detailing previous security incidents.

== Commanders ==
- Ri Ul-sol - 1996–2003
- Yun Jong-rin - 2003–2020
- Kwak Chang-sik (곽창식)- 2020

== Known members ==
- Kang Jin,
- Lee Young-kuk
- Pak Su-hyon

== Bibliography ==
- Bermudez Jr., Joseph S. (2001-03-14). The Armed Forces of North Korea. I.B. Tauris. ISBN 1-86064-486-4.
