= Cha Hui-rim =

North Korean politician (born 1953)

- 차희림

Chairman of the Pyongyang City People's Committee
- In office September 2012 – 2020
- Supreme Leader: Kim Jong-un
- Preceded by: Ryang Man-gil
- Succeeded by: Choi Hee-tae

Personal details
- Born: 1953 (age 72–73) Pyongyang, North Korea
- Party: Korean Workers'

Cha Hui-rim (Korean: 차희림; born 1953) is a North Korean politician. He is a candidate member of the Central Committee of the Workers' Party of Korea and chairman of the Pyongyang City People's Committee.

== Biography ==
He was born in 1953. He was elected as secretary of the WPK Pyongyang Party Committee in October 2011 after passing through the organizational secretary of the Ministry of Water and Construction. In September 2012, he was appointed chairman of the People's Committee of Pyongyang City as a successor to Ryang Man-gil. In November 2012, he was a member of the National Sports Coaching Committee. He was elected to the 13th convocation of the Supreme People's Assembly and was appointed a member of its Legislative Committee. In May 2016, at the 7th Congress of the Workers' Party of Korea he was elected as a candidate member for the Central Committee of the Workers' Party of Korea. In April 2017, he was promoted to full member. As of January 2020 he is the state official in charge of Pyongyang

Political offices
Preceded by Ryang Man-gil	Chairman of Pyongyang People's Committee; September 2012 - 2020	Succeeded by Choi Hee-tae
