= Pak Kyong-sam =

North Korean politician

- Hangul: 박경삼
- Hanja: 朴敬三
- RR: Bak Gyeongsam
- MR: Pak Kyŏngsam

Pak Kyong-sam is a North Korean politician. He has been chairman of the People's Committee of North Pyongan Province since 2002. In 2003, he was elected to the 11th session of the Supreme People's Assembly.

== See also ==
- Politics of North Korea
