= Pak Song-il =

North Korean ambassador

Pak Song-il was the ambassador for American affairs at North Korea's delegation to the United Nations in 2016.
