= Law of North Korea =

The law of North Korea (officially called the Democratic People's Republic of Korea) is a codified civil law system inherited from the Japanese and influenced by the Soviet Union. It is governed by The Socialist Constitution and operates within the political system of North Korea.

== Legal system ==
North Korea has a codified civil law system, which was inherited from colonial Japan and is similar to South Korea's system. As of December 2015, there were 236 laws and regulations, about half of which relate to economic management. The foreign investment laws are well-developed and up-to-date, and there is a highly developed arbitration system.

North Korea has a three-tier court system, based on the Soviet model, comprising a Central Court, provincial courts, and county courts. Judicial affairs are handled by the Central Procurator's Office.

The penal code is based on the principle of nullum crimen sine lege (no crime without a law), but remains a tool for political control despite several amendments reducing ideological influence. Courts carry out legal procedures related to not only criminal and civil matters, but also political cases as well. Political prisoners are the only ones who have their entire family and themselves sent to labor camps, while criminal offenders are incarcerated in correctional facilities and prisons by Saeng-Gaggyeongchal (known as the Thought Police in Korean).

== Legal profession ==
North Korean attorneys must join the Choson Bar Association. The association's Central Committee determines professional standards, as well as the qualifying or disqualifying of attorneys. Attorneys are not hired by individuals or agencies, but rather the committee collects legal representation requests and then assigns cases and pays remunerations to the assignee. However, attorneys do not have a monopoly on providing legal services as anyone might provide representation in civil or criminal proceedings. The Law College at Kim Il Sung University is the only university-level institution that provides legal education. It is estimated that there are about 500 registered lawyers in North Korea, of whom 200 are active in Pyongyang. For 12 years, Michael Hay was the only foreign lawyer operating in North Korea. He reported winning or partly winning 70% of cases when representing foreign firms.

In practice, lawyers are limited in what sort of defense they can mount on behalf of their clients in criminal trials, as the North Korean judicial system is an instrument of state power of North Korea's authoritarian government. Due to the small number of practicing lawyers it is difficult for defendants to even obtain one, and when a lawyer does represent a client, it is largely a formality. They may explain their clients' motives for committing their suspected crimes and make some positive comments about their clients but do not mount serious defenses.

== Law And Politics ==
According to Robert Collins of the Committee for Human Rights in North Korea, the specific hierarchy of authority in North Korea is the words or personal directives of Kim Jong Un, followed by the Ten Principles for the Establishment of a Monolithic Ideological System, WPK directives —particularly the policy guidance of the WPK Secretariat's Organization and Guidance Department, the WPK Charter and domestic civil laws, and finally the North Korean Constitution. The WPK, while maintaining the dominant political role within the North Korean party-state, came to serve the leader in primacy above all other political entities. As in other communist political systems, the state and society serve the party, and civil laws do not bind the party.

== See also ==
- Law enforcement in North Korea
- Politics of North Korea
