= Law enforcement in North Korea =

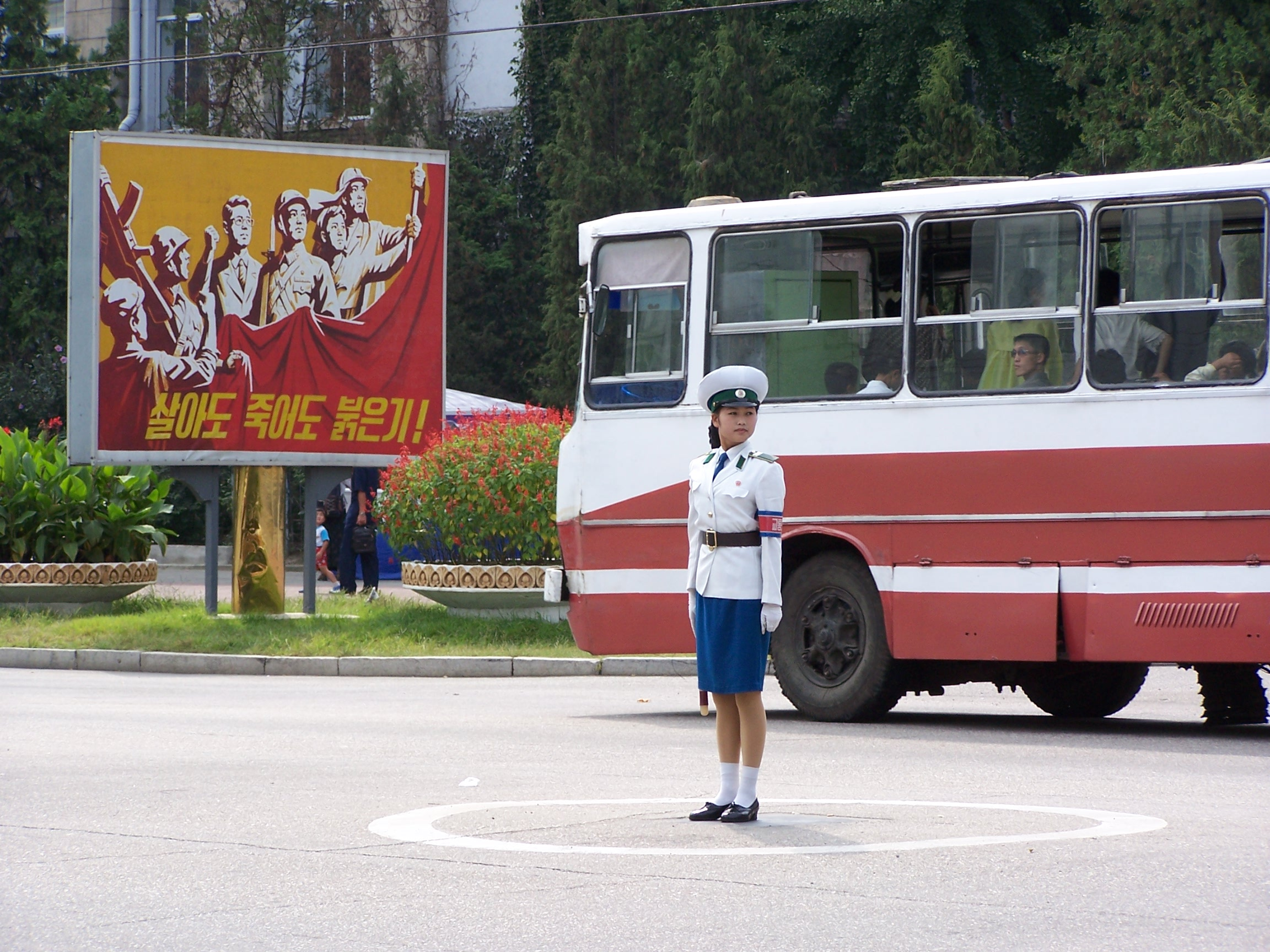
A policewoman in Pyongyang handling traffic, in 2007.

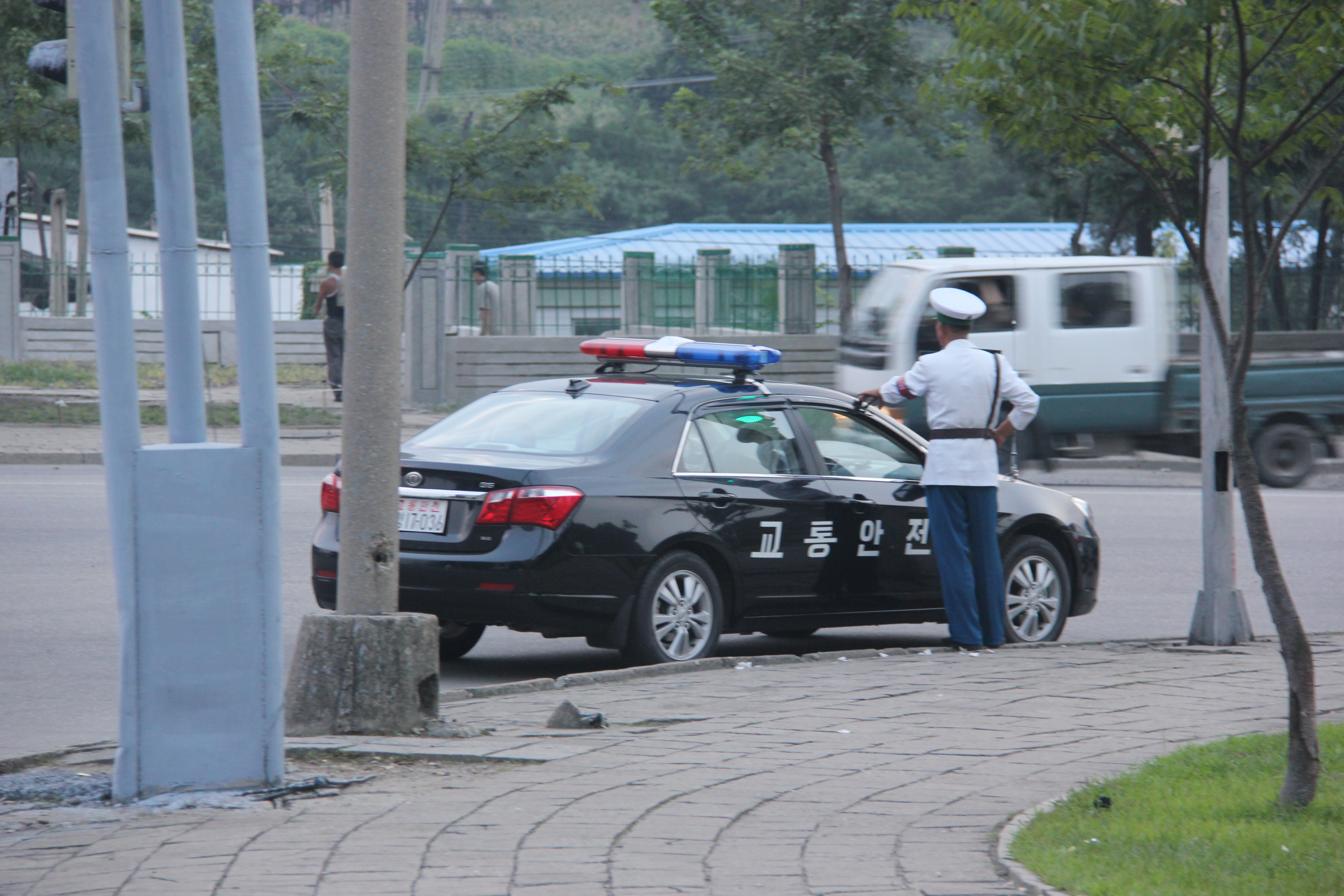
A North Korean police car in 2012; the Korean text on the side translates as "Traffic safety".

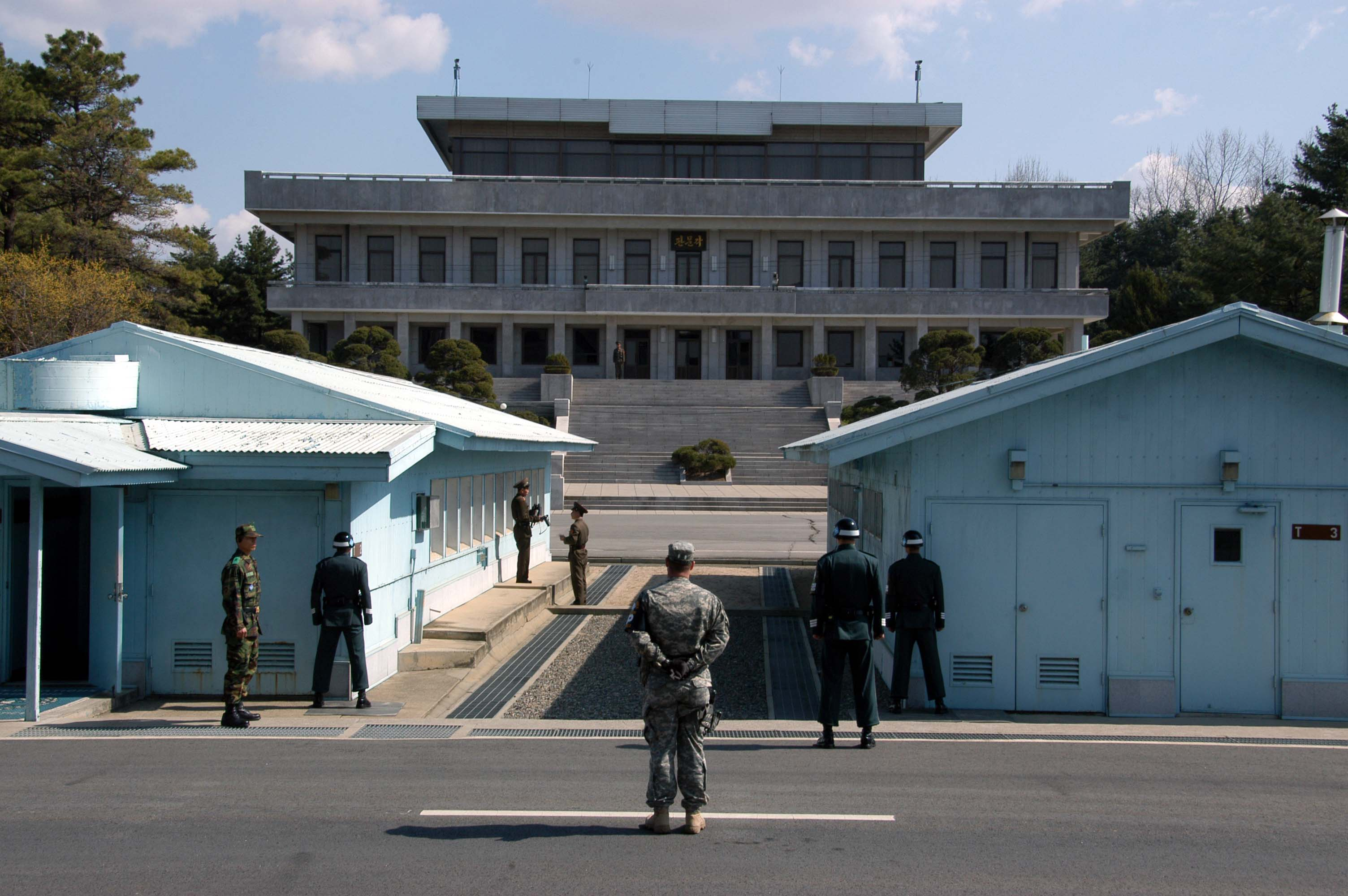
South Korean and North Korean authorities at the South Korea-North Korea border.

The Ministry of Social Security and the Ministry of State Security are responsible for internal security in North Korea. Although both are government organs, they are tightly controlled by the party apparatus through the Justice and Security Commission and the penetration of their structures by the party apparatus at all levels. The formal public security structure is augmented by a pervasive system of informers throughout the society. Surveillance of citizens, both physical and electronic, is also routine.

== People's Security ==
The Ministry of Social Security, responsible for internal security, social control, and basic police functions, is one of the most powerful organizations in North Korea and controls the People's Social Security Forces, composed of an estimated 144,000 public security personnel. It maintains law and public order; investigates common criminal cases; manages the prison system and traffic control; monitors citizens' political attitudes; conducts background investigations, census, and civil registrations; controls individual travel; manages the government's classified documents; protects government and party officials; and patrols government buildings and some government and party construction activities.

The ministry has deputy ministers for personnel, political affairs, legal counselling, security, surveillance, internal affairs, rear services, and engineering. There are approximately twenty-seven bureaus, but the functional responsibilities of only some of the bureaus are known. The Security Bureau is responsible for ordinary law enforcement and most police functions. The Investigation Bureau handles investigations of criminal and economic crimes. The Protection Bureau is responsible for fire protection, traffic control, public health, and customs. The Registration Bureau issues citizen identification cards and maintains public records on births, deaths, marriages, residence registration, and passports.

Below the ministry level, there are public security bureaus for each province and directly administered city. These bureaus are headed by either a senior colonel or a lieutenant colonel of police, depending on the size of the population. Public security departments at each city or county and smaller substations through the country are staffed by about 100 personnel and are led by subaltern officers. They are organized roughly parallel to the ministry itself and have several divisions responsible for carrying out various functions.

North Korean uniformed civil police officers are primarily unarmed traffic officers.

== State Security Department ==
In 1973, political security responsibilities were transferred from the Ministry of People's Security to the State Security Department, an autonomous agency reporting directly to Kim Il Sung. The State Security Department carries out a wide range of counterintelligence and internal security functions normally associated with "secret police".

It is charged with searching out antistate criminals—a general category that includes those accused of anti-government and dissident activities, economic crimes, and slander of the political leadership. Camps for political prisoners are under its jurisdiction. It has counterintelligence responsibilities at home and abroad, and runs overseas intelligence collection operations. It monitors political attitudes and maintains surveillance of returnees. Ministry personnel escort high-ranking officials.

The ministry also guards national borders and monitors international entry points. The degree of control it exercises over the Political Security Bureaus of the KPA—which has representatives at all levels of command—is unclear.

== Border Guard ==
The People's Border Guards are the paramilitary forces of the Ministry of Social Security and are an independent institution separate from the KPSSF. They are primarily concerned with border surveillance and with internal security functions. The latter activities include physical protection of government buildings and facilities. During a conflict, they would probably be used in border and rear area security missions.

Usually personnel of the PBG are armed with the Type 58 and the Type 88 assault rifles.

== See also ==
- Law of North Korea
