= Pak Myong-chol =

North Korean politician

Pak Myong Chol
- 박명철
- Born: September 15, 1941 (age 84); Gishū, Heianhoku-dō, Chōsen
- Spouse: Kim Yong-suk
- Relatives: Rikidōzan (father-in-law); Pak Myong-son (sister)

Korean name
- Hangul: 박명철
- Hanja: 朴明哲
- RR: Bak Myeongcheol
- MR: Pak Myŏngch'ŏl

Pak Myong-chol (Korean: 박명철; born 15 September 1941) is a North Korean political figure who joined the 6th Central Committee of the Korean Workers' Party in September 2010, along with Kim Jong Un. He has served in several important posts in North Korea, including on the National Defence Commission and as Minister of Physical Culture and Sports in the Cabinet of North Korea.

== Life and career ==
Pak Myong-chol was born on 15 September 1941, in the northwestern Korean county of Uiju. When Pak was 17 or 18 years old, in 1959, his father Pak Jong-ho (朴正浩) was sent to South Korea on a mission from North Korean leader Kim Il Sung and captured and killed. Consequently, the North Korean leader reportedly told the young Pak and his siblings that he, Kim Il Sung, would "look after them." Pak has been involved in the administration of sport in various high posts in North Korea since at least 1975.

He served as the head of North Korea's Olympic Committee in 1992 (a role which he reprised in 2004), and served on Kim Il Sung's funeral committee in 1994. He travelled to Busan in South Korea in 2002 for the Asian Games which were taking place, arriving by boat with a huge delegation of cheerleaders that brought the number of North Koreans in Busan to nearly 700.

He joined the Central Committee of the Korean Workers' Party in September 2010, and when Kim Jong Il died in December 2011, Pak was on the latter's funeral committee. While the South Korean Ministry of Unification noted that his appearances were curtailed after April 2012 and some speculated Kim Jong Un was purging officials installed by his father, he was appointed to a number of less powerful positions in 2014, including President of the DPRK Central Court, and as a member of the Supreme People's Assembly.

In his youth, Pak trained as a wrestler, which is possibly how he met his wife. His wife is named Kim Yong-suk (金英淑); she is not to be confused with Kim Jong Il's wife of the same name. She is the daughter of the famous Korean-Japanese wrestler Rikidōzan, apparently from the first of his four marriages. Thanks in part to his wife, Pak had a close tie to the famous Japanese wrestler-politician and advocate of engagement with North Korea Antonio Inoki.
