= Pyongyang =

Capital and largest city of North Korea

- Directly governed city
- Pyongyang Directly Governed City
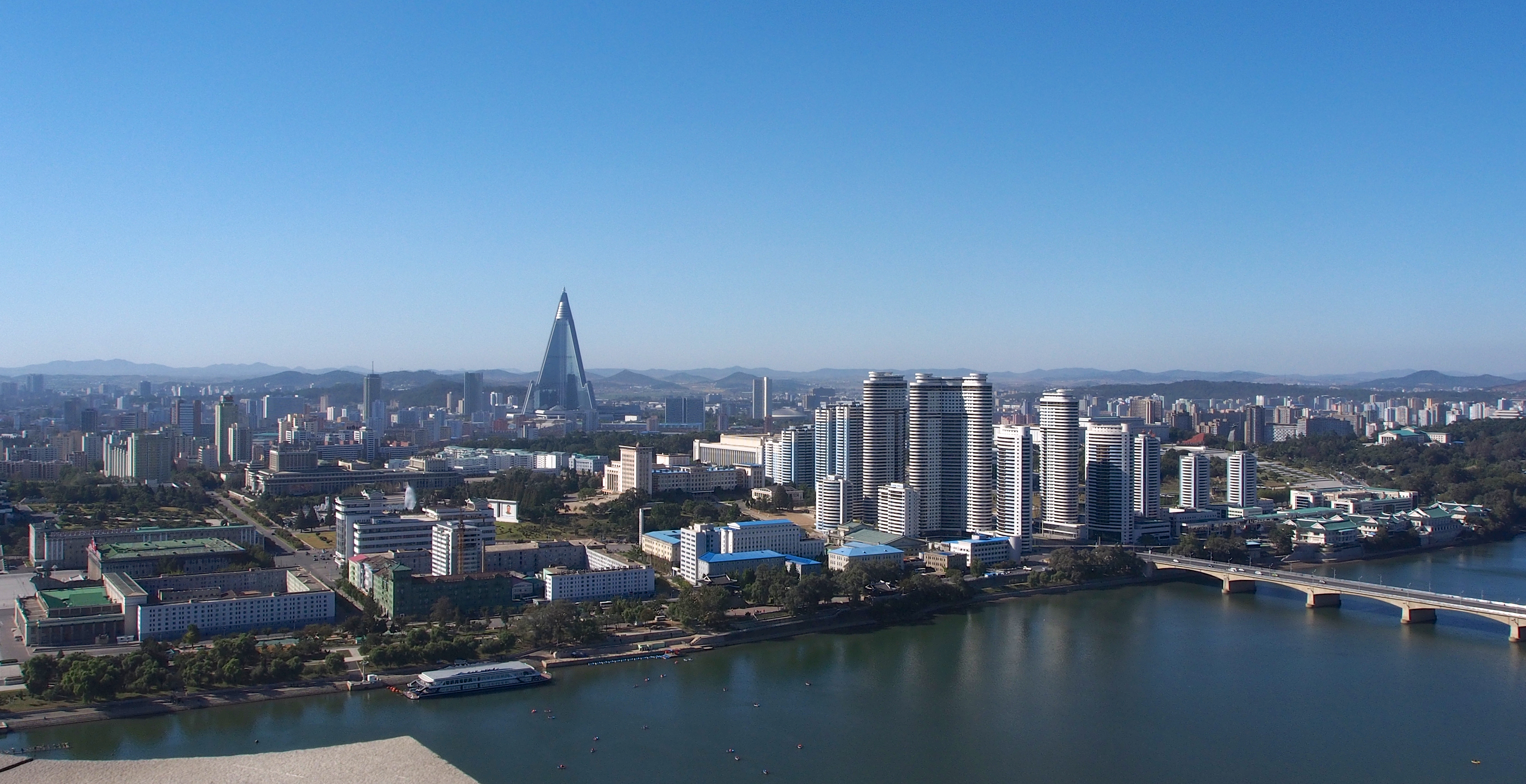
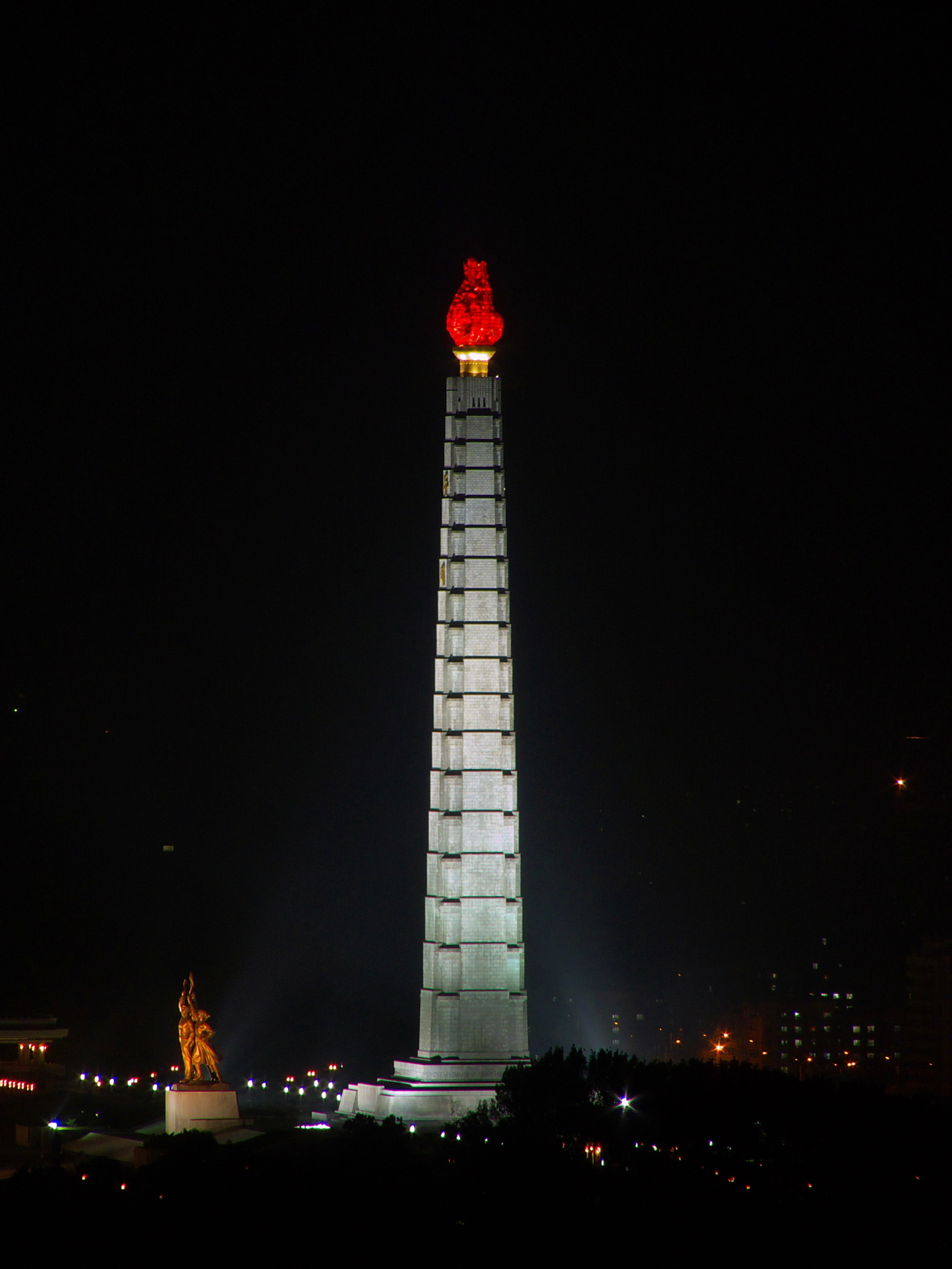
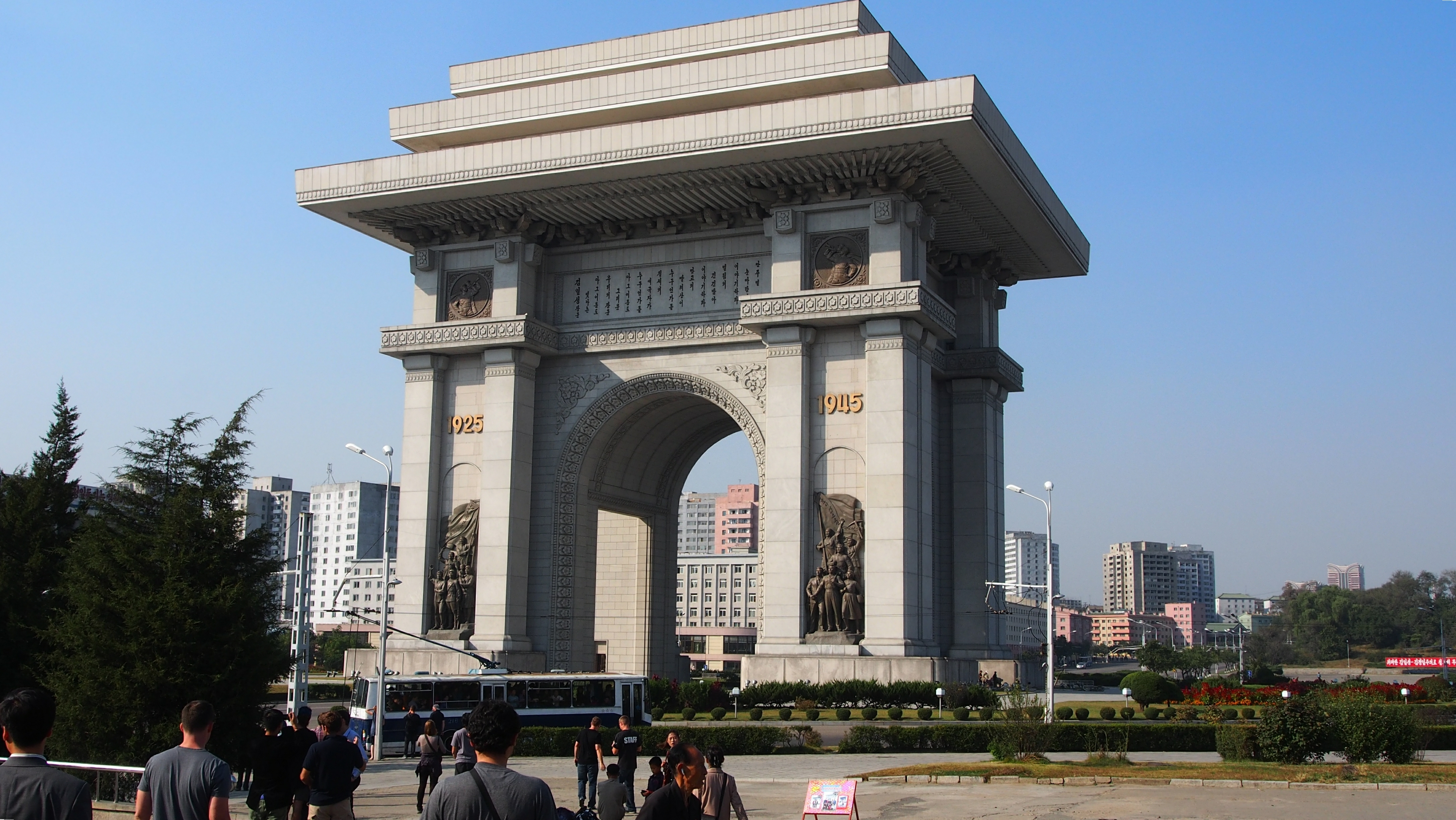
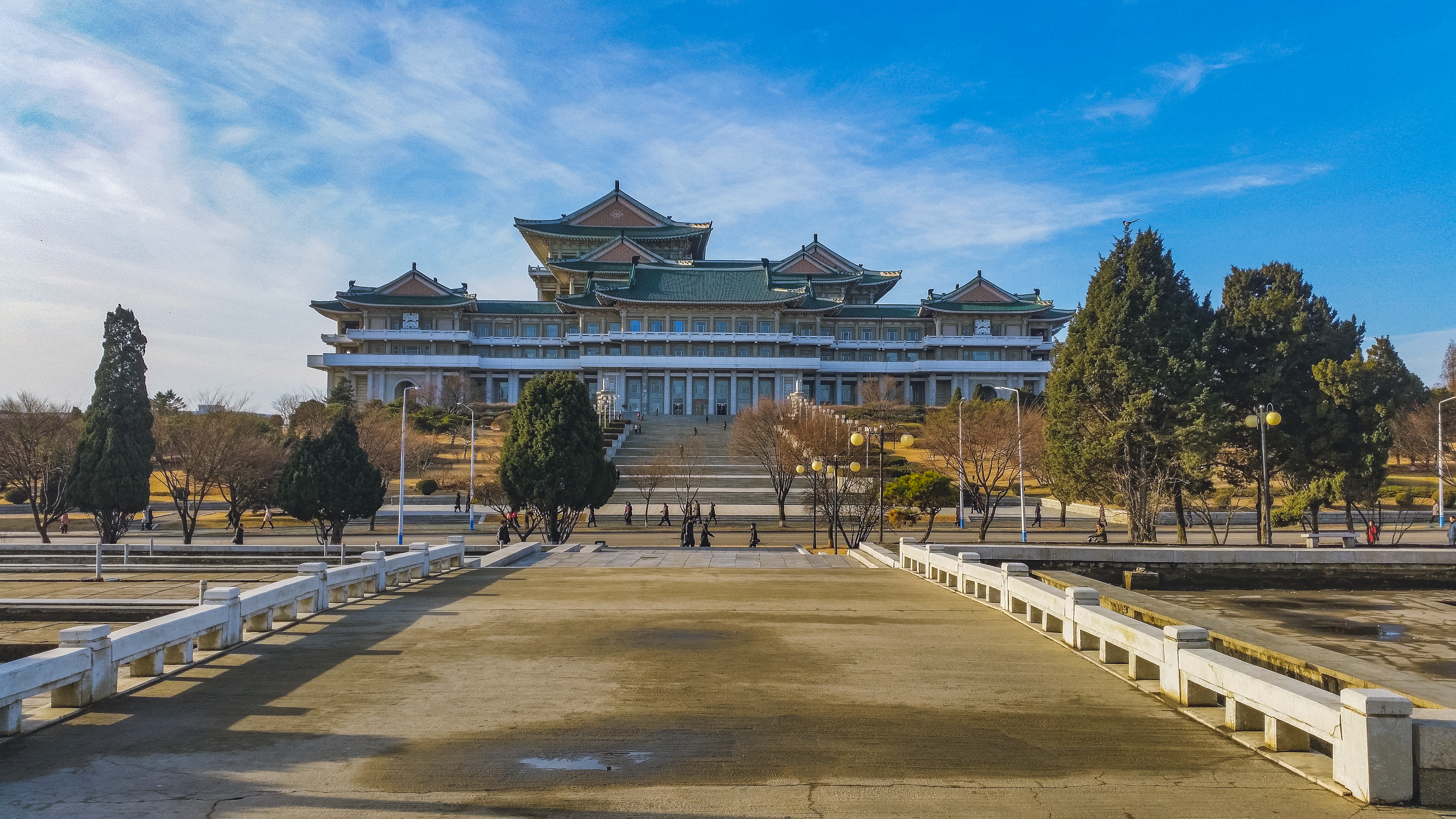
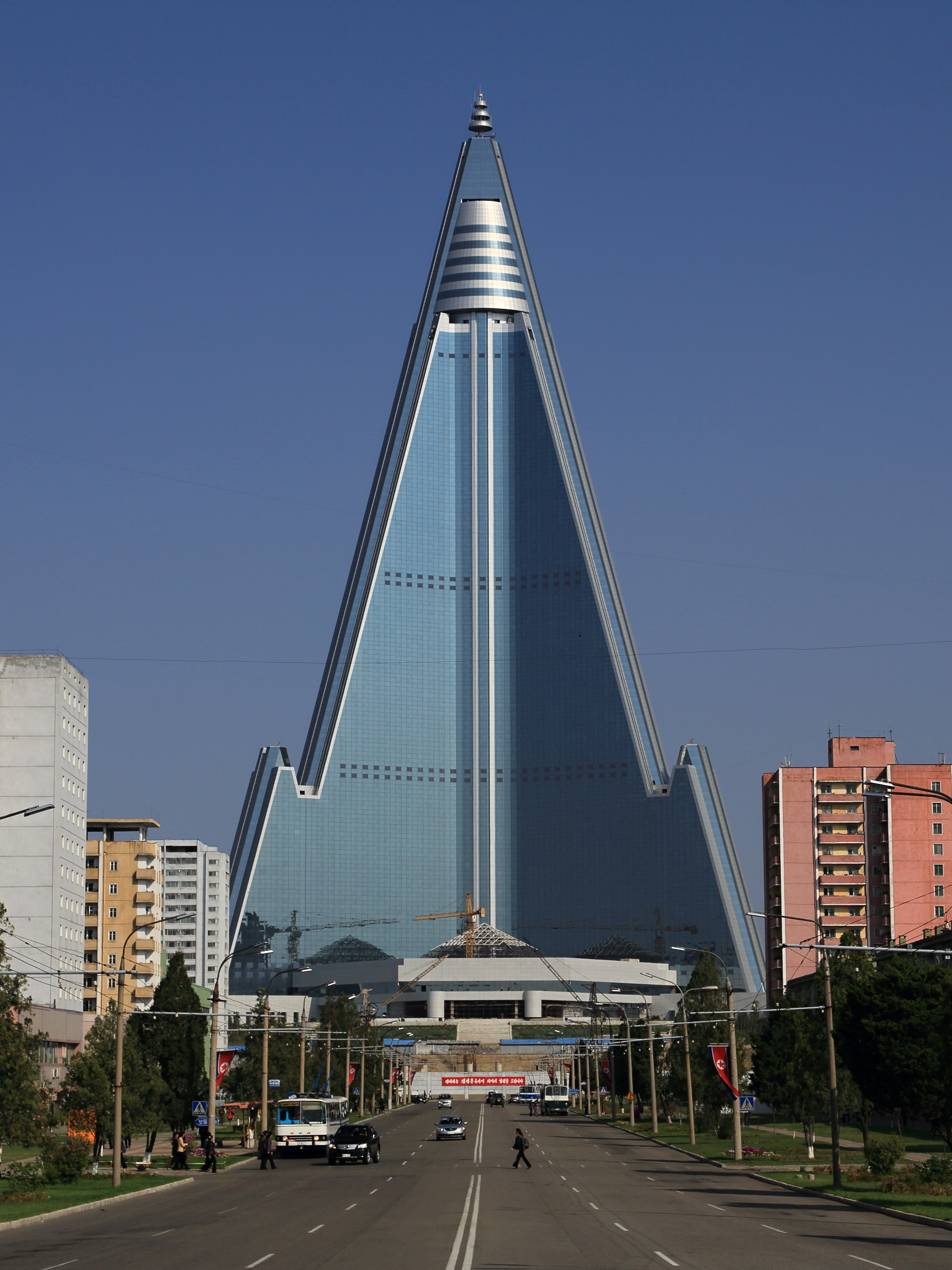
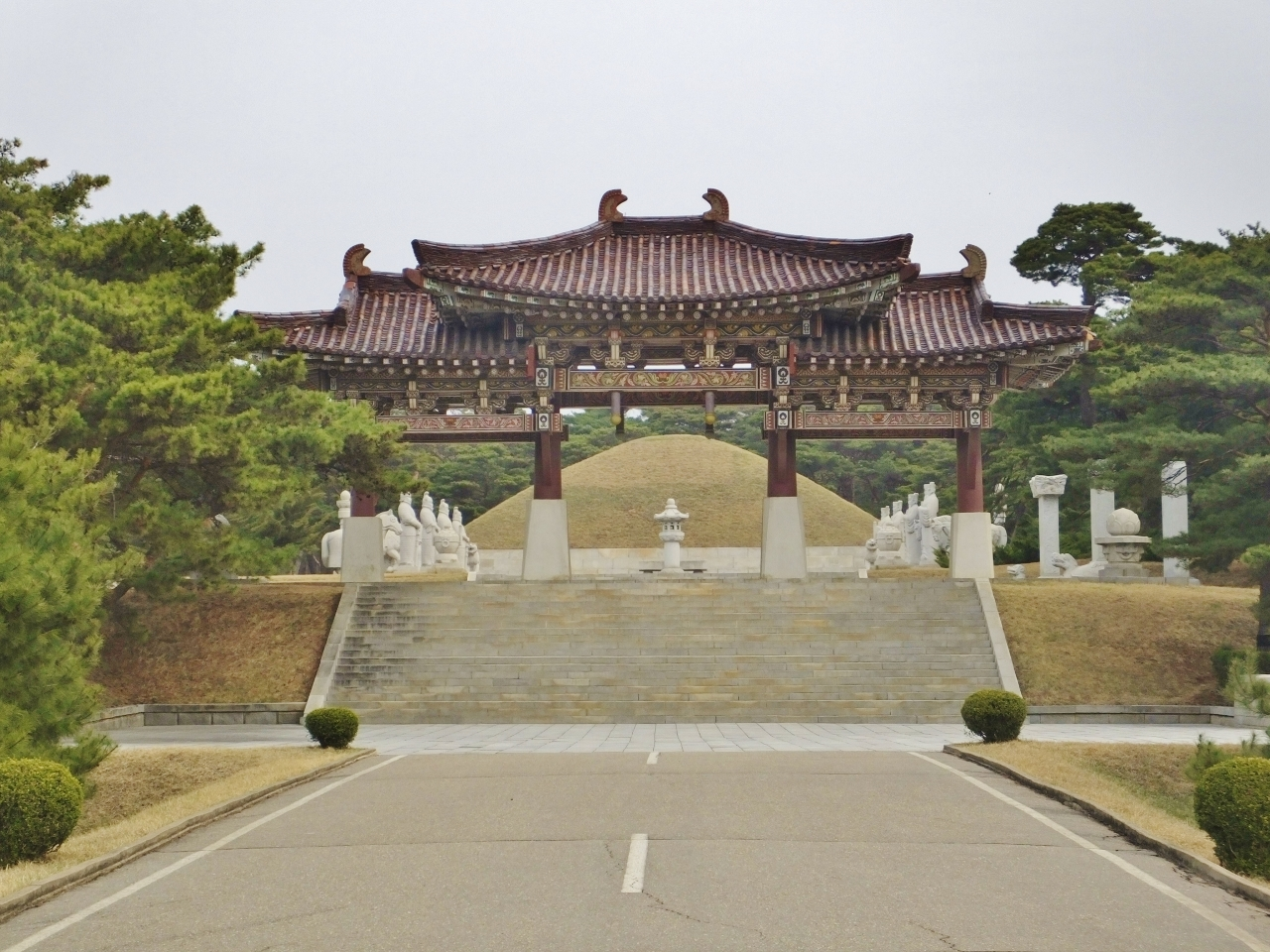
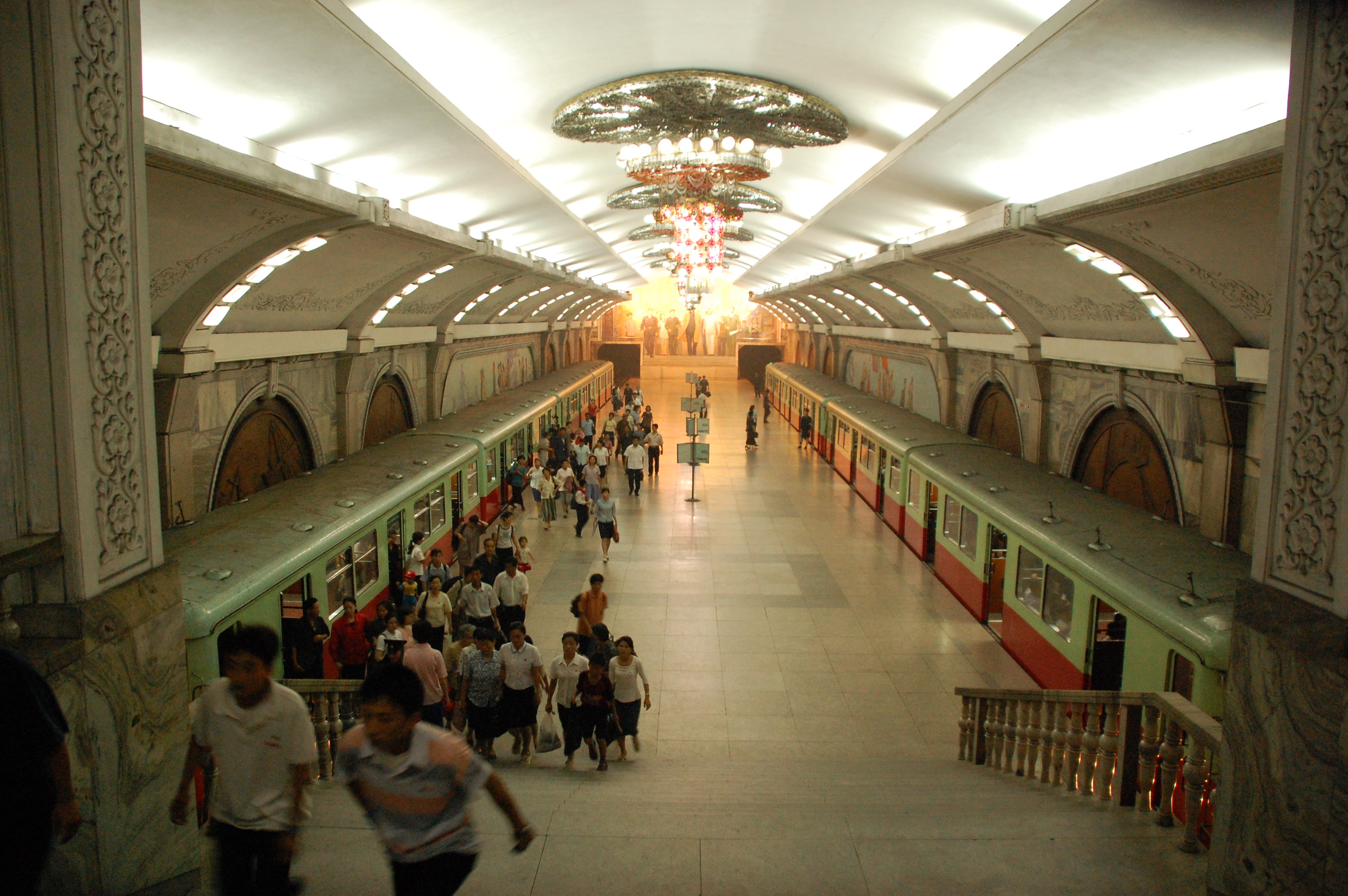
- Pyongyang skyline and the Ryugyong Hotel Juche Tower Arch of Triumph Grand People's Study House Ryugyong Hotel Tomb of King Tongmyong Pyongyang Metro
- Nickname: (류경/柳京) (Korean) "Capital of Willows"
- Location of Pyongyang in North Korea
- Coordinates: 39°01′00″N 125°44′51″E
- Country: North Korea
- Districts: 19 districts(or wards), 2 counties, 1 neighbourhood: Chung-guyok; Pyongchon-guyok; Potonggang-guyok; Moranbong-guyok; Sosong-guyok; Songyo-guyok; Tongdaewon-guyok; Taedonggang-guyok; Sadong-guyok; Taesong-guyok; Mangyongdae-guyok; Hyongjesan-guyok; Ryongsong-guyok; Samsok-guyok; Ryokpo-guyok; Rangrang-guyok; Sunan-guyok; Unjong-guyok; Hwasong-guyok; Kangdong County; Kangnam County; Panghyon-dong

Government
  - Type: Directly governed city
  - Body: Pyongyang City People's Assembly
  - Secretary of the City WPK Committee: Kim Su-gil
  - Chairman of the City People's Committee: Choi Hee-tae

Area
  - Directly governed city: 829.1 km^{2} (320.1 sq mi)
  - Metro: 3,194 km^{2} (1,233 sq mi)
- Elevation: 1.8 m (6 ft)

Population (2021)
  - Directly governed city: 3,157,538
  - Density: 3,808/km^{2} (9,864/sq mi)
- Demonym: Pyongyangite(s)
- Time zone: UTC+09:00 (PYT)
- ISO 3166 code: KP-01

Korean name
- Hangul: 평양직할시
- Hanja: 平壤直轄市
- RR: Pyeongyang-jikhalsi
- MR: P'yŏngyang-jikhalsi

Pyongyang (Note: English: /pjɒŋˈjæŋ, pjʌŋ-, -jɑːŋ/; Korean: [pʰjɔŋ.jaŋ]) (Korean: 평양) is the capital and largest city of North Korea. According to the 2008 population census, it has a population of 3,255,288. Pyongyang is located on the Taedong River about 109 kilometers (68 miles) upstream from its mouth on the Yellow Sea. Pyongyang is a directly administered city (직할시; 直轄市; chikhalsi) with a status equal to that of the North Korean provinces.

Pyongyang is one of the oldest cities in Korea. According to legend, it was founded in 1122 BC on the site of the capital of the legendary king Tan'gun. It was the capital of two ancient Korean kingdoms, Gojoseon and Goguryeo, and served as the secondary capital of Goryeo. Following the establishment of North Korea in 1948, Pyongyang became its de facto capital. The city was again devastated during the Korean War, but was quickly rebuilt after the war with Soviet assistance. The city was declared to be the official capital with the 1972 Constitution. Under the leadership of Kim Jong Un, there has been a construction boom in the city.

Pyongyang is the political, industrial and transport center of North Korea. It is estimated that 99% of those living in Pyongyang are members, candidate members, or dependents of members of the ruling Workers' Party of Korea (WPK). It is home to North Korea's major government institutions, as well as the WPK which has its headquarters in the Government Complex No. 1.

== Names ==
The name "Pyongyang" derives from the Sino-Korean words 平 (flat) and 壤 (land). It is the McCune–Reischauer romanisation of the Korean term '평양', which translates to 'flat land', reflecting the smooth terrain of the city. In native Korean, the city was called "Buruna" (부루나) or less commonly "Barana" (바라나) which, using the idu system, was the pronunciation of the Chinese characters of "Pyongyang". "Buru" (부루) means "field" whereas "na" (나) means "land", therefore the meaning of Pyongyang in native Korean would be "Land of the field".

The city's other historic names include Ryugyong, Kisong, Hwangsong, Rakrang, Sŏgyong, Sodo, Hogyong, Changan, and Heijō (during Japanese rule in Korea). There are several variants. (Note: These include: Heijō-fu, Heizyō, Heizyō Hu, Hpyeng-yang, P-hjöng-jang, Phyeng-yang, Phyong-yang, Pienyang, P'ing-jang, Pingrang, Pingyang, Pyengyang, and Pieng-tang.) During the early 20th century, Pyongyang came to be known among missionaries as being the "Jerusalem of the East", due to its historical status as a stronghold of Christianity, namely Protestantism, especially during the Pyongyang Revival of 1907.

In North Korean news, media, and publications, Pyongyang is occasionally labeled as the "Capital of the Revolution" (혁명의 수도).

After Kim Il Sung's death in 1994, some members of Kim Jong Il's faction proposed changing the name of Pyongyang to "Kim Il Sung City" (Korean: 김일성시; Hanja: 金日成市), but others suggested that North Korea should begin calling Seoul "Kim Il Sung City" instead and grant Pyongyang the moniker "Kim Jong Il City". In the end, neither proposal was implemented.

== History ==
=== Prehistory ===
In 1955, archaeologists excavated evidence of prehistoric dwellings in a large ancient village in the Pyongyang area, called Kŭmtan-ni, dating to the Jeulmun and Mumun pottery periods. North Koreans associate Pyongyang with the mythological city of "Asadal", or Wanggeom-seong, the first capital of Gojoseon ("Old Joseon") in the second millennium BC, according to Korean historiographies beginning with the 13th-century Samguk yusa.

Historians deny this claim because earlier Chinese historiographical works such as the Guanzi, Classic of Mountains and Seas, Records of the Grand Historian, and Records of the Three Kingdoms, mention a much later "Joseon". The connection between the two therefore may have been asserted by North Korea for the use of propaganda. Nevertheless, Pyongyang became a major city in old Joseon.

=== Historical period ===
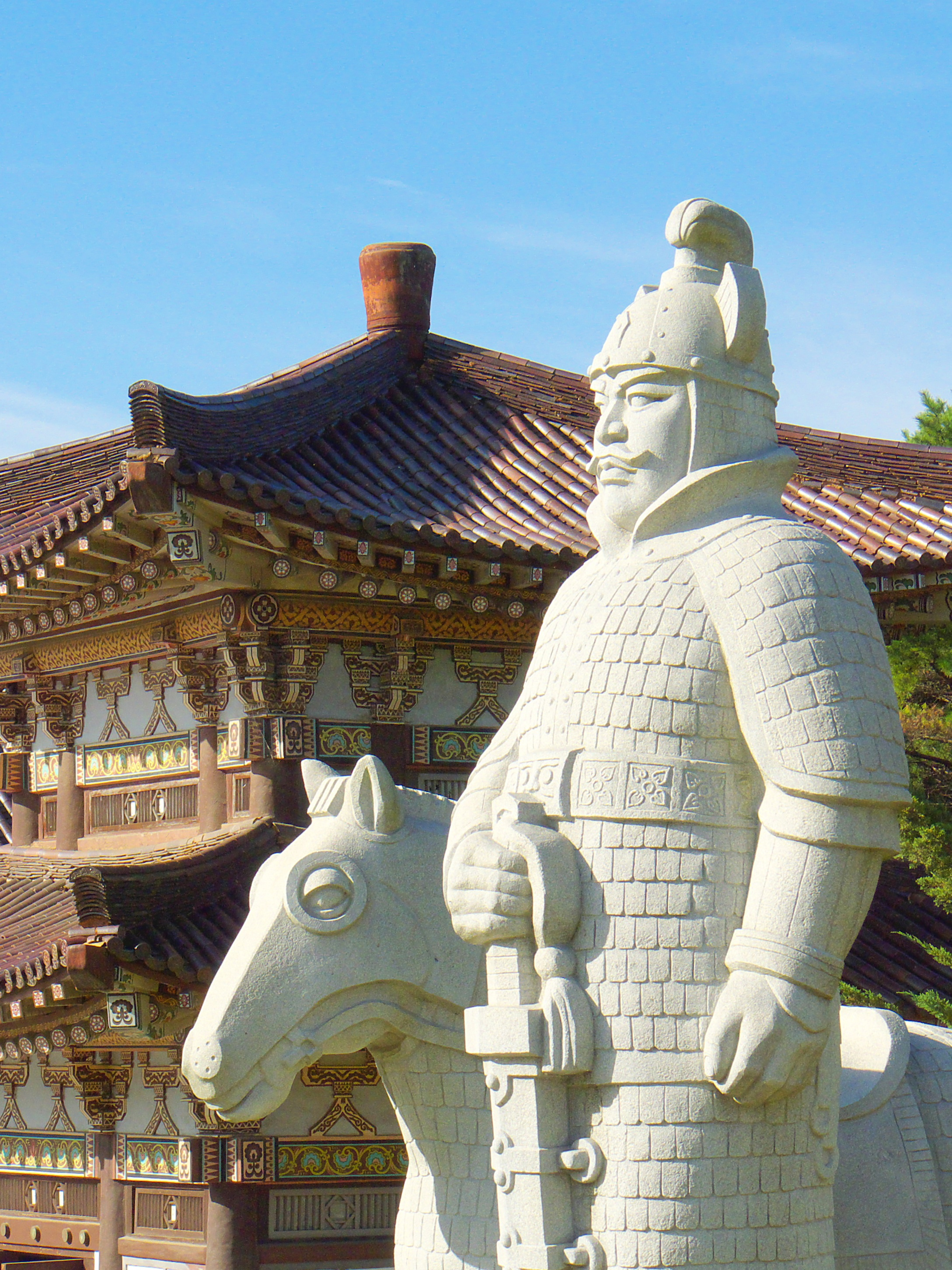
Tomb of King Tongmyong

According to legend, Pyongyang was founded in 1122 BC on the site of the capital of the legendary king Tan'gun. Wanggeom-seong, which was located in the same place as modern-day Pyongyang, served as the capital of Gojoseon from 194 to 108 BC. It fell in the Han conquest of Gojoseon in 108 BC. Emperor Wu of Han ordered four commanderies be set up, with Lelang Commandery in the center and its capital established as "Joseon" (朝鮮縣, 조선현) at the location of Pyongyang. Several archaeological findings in the Pyongyang area dated to the later Eastern Han (20–220 AD) period seem to suggest that Han forces later launched brief incursions nearby.

The area around the city was called Nanglang during the early Three Kingdoms period. As the capital of Nanglang (낙랑국; 樂浪國), (Note: Nanglang-state is different from Lelang Commandery.) Pyongyang remained an important commercial and cultural outpost after the Lelang Commandery was destroyed by an expanding Goguryeo in 313.

Goguryeo moved its capital there in 427. According to Christopher I. Beckwith, Pyongyang is the Sino-Korean reading of the name they gave it in the Goguryeo language: *Piarna, or "level land". He also writes that the Goguryeo term *Piarna has never been documented, but has been reconstructed based on the individual terms for flat and land in the language.

In 668, Pyongyang became the capital of the Protectorate General to Pacify the East established by the Tang dynasty of China. By 676, it was conquered by Silla, but was left on the border between Silla and Balhae. Pyongyang was left abandoned during the Later Silla period, until it was recovered by Wang Geon and decreed as the Western Capital of Goryeo.

During the Imjin War, Pyongyang was captured by the Japanese, who held the city wall until they were defeated in the Siege of Pyongyang. Later in the 17th century, it was temporarily occupied during the Qing invasion of Joseon until peace arrangements were made between Korea and Qing China. While the invasions made Koreans suspicious of foreigners, the influence of Christianity began to grow after the country opened itself up to foreigners in the 16th century. Pyongyang became the base of Christian expansion in Korea. By 1880 it had more than 100 churches and more Protestant missionaries than any other Asian city, and was called "the Jerusalem of the East".

In 1890, the city had 40,000 inhabitants. It was the site of the Battle of Pyongyang during the First Sino-Japanese War, which led to the destruction and depopulation of much of the city. It was the provincial capital of South Pyongan Province beginning in 1896. During the Japanese colonial rule, Japan tried to develop the city as an industrial center, but faced the March First Movement in 1919 and severe anti-Japanese socialist movements in 1920s due to economic exploitation. It was called Heijō (composed of the same Chinese characters 平壤, but read as へいじょう) in Japanese.

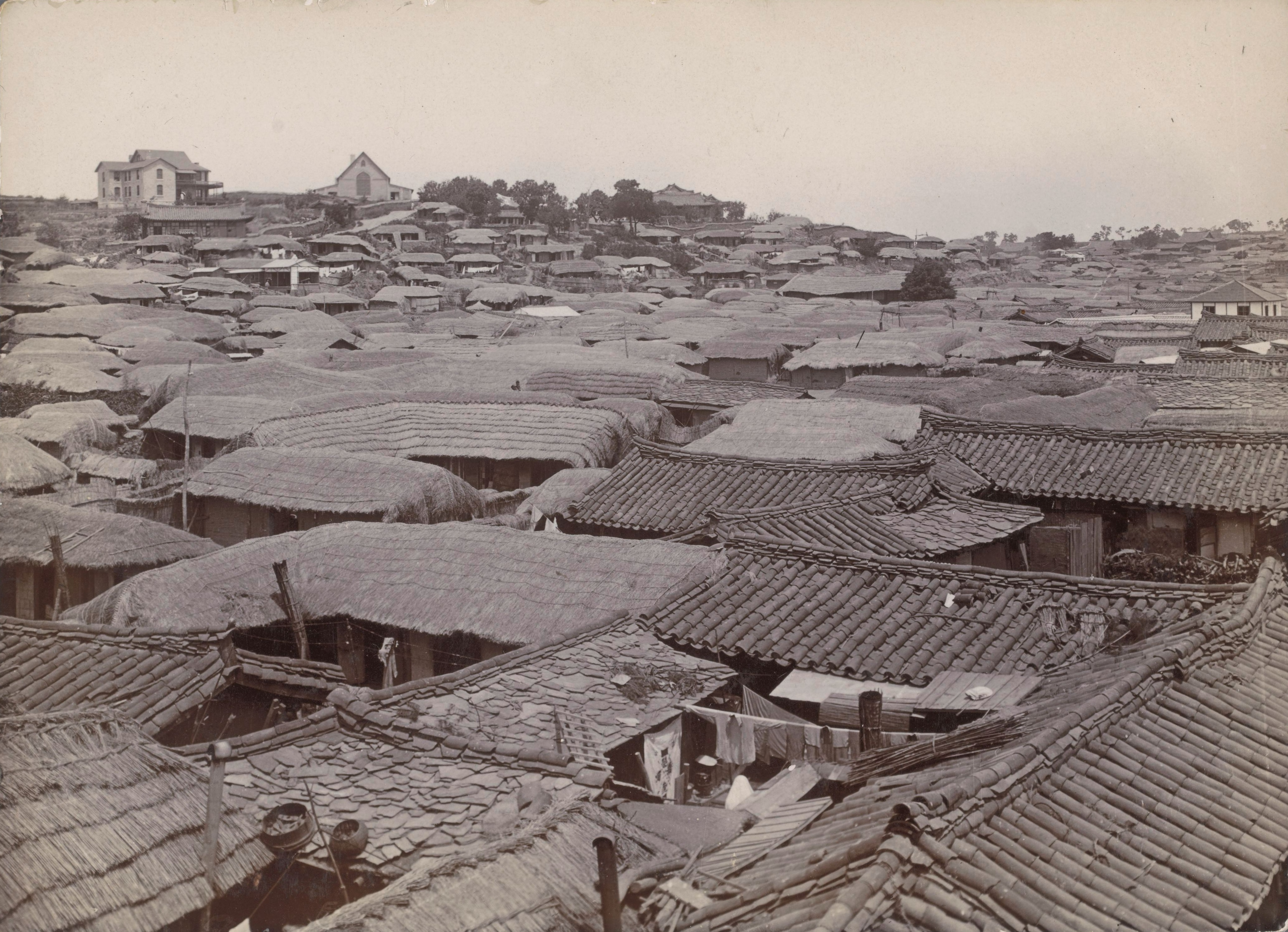
Pyongyang, 1907

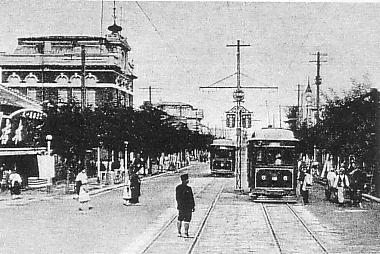
Pyongyang Tram, c. 1920s

In July 1931, the city experienced anti-Chinese riots as a result of the Wanpaoshan Incident and the sensationalized media reports about it which appeared in Imperial Japanese and Korean newspapers. By 1938, Pyongyang had a population of 235,000.

=== After 1945 ===
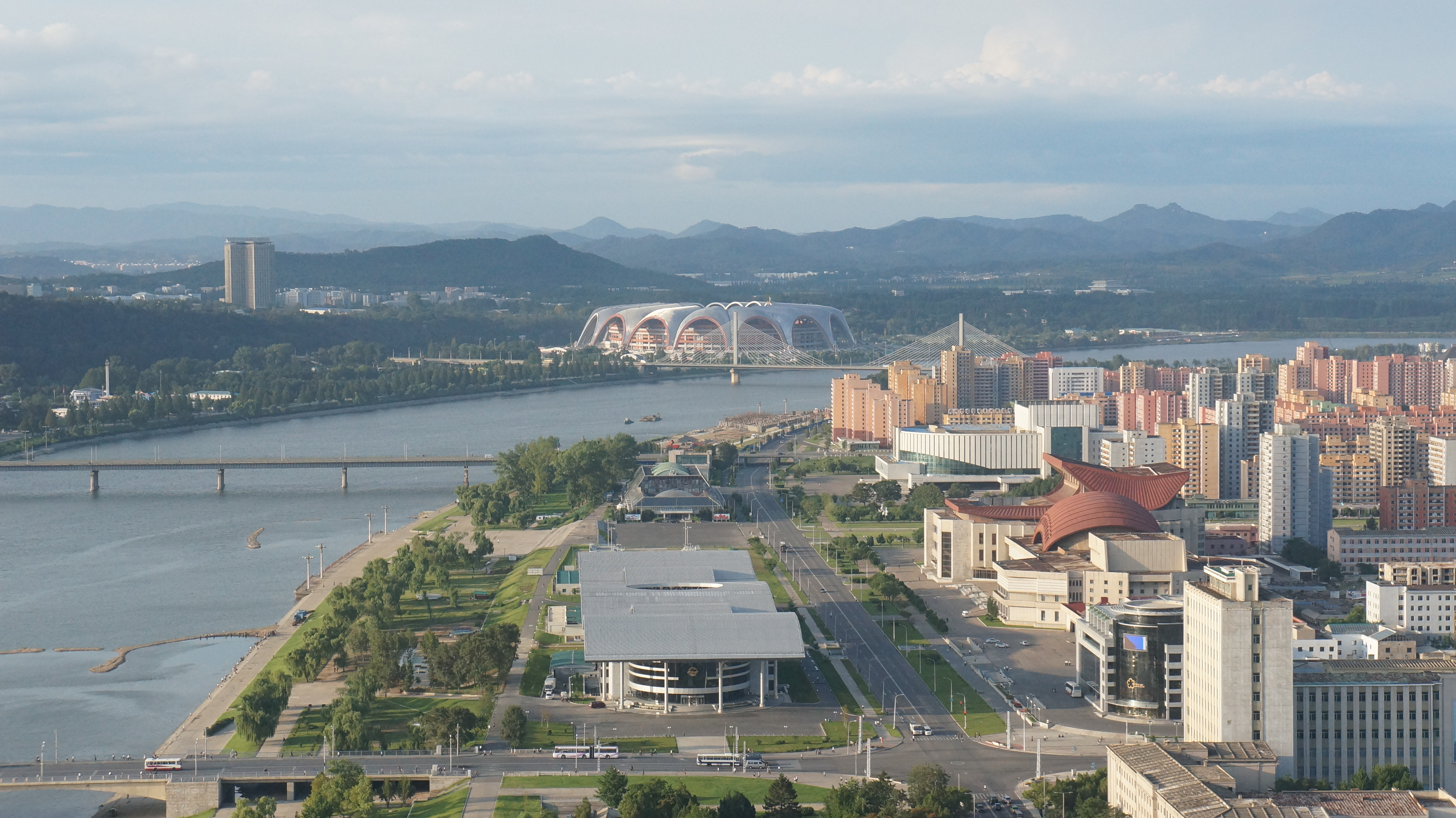
Modern-day Pyongyang

On 25 August 1945, the Soviet 25th Army entered Pyongyang and it became the temporary capital of the Provisional People's Committee of North Korea. A People's Committee was already established there, led by veteran Christian nationalist Cho Man-sik. Pyongyang became the de facto capital of North Korea upon its establishment in 1948. At the time, the Pyongyang government aimed to recapture Korea's official capital, Seoul. Pyongyang was again severely damaged in the Korean War, during which it was briefly occupied by South Korean forces from 19 October to 6 December 1950. The city saw many refugees evacuate when advancing Chinese forces pushed southward towards Pyongyang. UN forces oversaw the evacuation of refugees as they retreated from Pyongyang in December 1950. In 1952, it was the target of the largest aerial raid of the entire war, involving 1,400 UN aircraft.

Already during the war, plans were made to reconstruct the city. The plans for the modern city of Pyongyang were first displayed for public viewing in a theatre building. On 27 July 1953 – the day the armistice between North Korea and South Korea was signed – The Pyongyang Review wrote: "While streets were in flames, an exhibition showing the general plan of restoration of Pyongyang was held at the Moranbong Underground Theater", the air raid shelter of the government under Moranbong. "On the way of victory... fireworks which streamed high into the night sky of the capital in a gun salute briefly illuminated the construction plan of the city which would rise soon with a new look". After the war, the city was quickly rebuilt with assistance from the Soviet Union, and many buildings were built in the style of Stalinist architecture. Kim Jung-hee, one of the founding members of the Korean Architects Alliance, who had studied architecture in prewar Japan, was appointed by Kim Il Sung to design the city's master plan. Moscow Architectural Institute designed the "Pyongyang City Reconstruction and Construction Comprehensive Plan" in 1951, and it was officially adopted in 1953. The transformation into a modern, propaganda-designed city featuring Stalinist architecture with Korean arrangement (and other modernist architecture said to have been greatly influenced by Brazilian architect Oscar Niemeyer) began. The 1972 Constitution officially declared Pyongyang the capital. During Kim Il Sung's 1956 diplomatic tour of the USSR, he was heavily inspired by Proto-Krushchyovka mass housing concepts introduced to him, which were urgently replicated in the fast-expanding region south of the Taedong. Soviet architectural influence re-emerged in the 1980s; the newly-built Kwangbok and Tongil Street apartments were of near-identical design to Brezhnevka.

The funeral of Kim Il Sung was held in Pyongyang in 1994. On 19 July, it concluded with a procession in which his corpse moved through the streets in a hearse as people cried out in hysteria.

In 2001, North Korean authorities began a long-term modernisation programme. The Ministry of Capital City Construction Development was included in the Cabinet that year. In 2006, Kim Jong Il's brother-in-law Jang Song Thaek took charge of the ministry.

Throughout the rule of Kim Jong Un, a number of residential projects were constructed. In 2012, a residential project with 2,784 units was inaugurated on Changjon Street in the heart of Pyongyang. In 2013 and 2014, residential projects dedicated to scientists were completed on Unha Scientists Street and Wisong Scientists Street, with more than 1,000 units each, while in 2015 work took place on a residential project on Mirae Scientists Street with 2,584 units. In 2017, in dedication to the 105th birthday of the founder and first leader, Kim Il Sung, 4,804 units were built in the new Ryomyong Street complex.

Other recent public building projects include the Mansudae People's Theatre opened in 2012, the Munsu Water Park opened in 2013, and the renovated and expanded Sunan International Airport and Pyongyang Sci-Tech Complex, both completed in 2015, the Samjiyon Orchestra Theater, which was fitted out of the domed Korean People's Army Circus built in 1964, and the Pyongyang General Hospital, of which construction started in 2020. Additional redevelopment projects occurred in the area around the Arch of Triumph where the Pyongyang People's Hospital no. 1 was demolished. Apartment blocks in the area of Inhŭng-dong, in Moranbong District and in the area of Sinwon-dong in Potonggang District were demolished in 2018–2019 for the construction of new apartment buildings. Also in 2018, the Youth Park Open-Air Theatre on Sungri Street, used to host political rallies, was rebuilt.

In 2021, Kim Jong Un during the 8th Congress of the WPK set forth a major 5 year plan for the construction of 50,000 new flats, with 10,000 flats to be completed each year. The first phase of construction began in March 2021 with Songhwa Street in Songhwa and Songsin areas of Sadong District in the eastern part of the city which included the 80 story Songhwa Street Main Tower. It also saw the construction of the Pothong Riverside Terraced Residential District located at the city center on land previously used by the headquarters of the International Taekwon-Do Federation. Kim Jong Un ordered that the residential district be renamed "Kyongru-dong" meaning "beautiful bead terrace". From the 50s to the 70s the area was the location of the residence of Kim Il Sung and was known as "Mansion No. 5". In 2022, construction shifted into the Hwasong area of Hwasong District in the northwest of the city, where 40,000 flats would be built in 4 years to create a model district. Construction of Hwasong Street with 10,000 flats serves as the first stage out of four stages of construction in the district. In April 2023, the first stage of the Hwasong area was completed, and stage two the Hwasong area was launched on the former land of the Pyongyang Vegetable Science Institute. This stage also saw construction of new high-rises in Sopho area of Hyongjesan District. In addition, a complex of greenhouse farms and housing was initiated on the former territory of Kangdong Airfield, which was demolished in 2019.

In April 2024, Rimhung Street was inaugurated as stage two of the Hwasong area; completion was celebrated with an extravagant ceremony. In May 2024, Jonwi Street in Hyongjesan District was inaugurated, completing the quota of 10,000 apartments that year. Stage three saw new residential zones built in Hwasong District and was completed in April 2025. In February 2025, the 4th stage of the Hwasong area and final stage of the 50,000 flats project broke ground for a new street and new residential zones including in Taesong District, next to the Korea Central Zoo. The inauguration of Saebyol Street in February 2026 saw the completion of 10,000 more apartments, marking the completion of the 50,000 flats initiative, with nearly a total of 60,000 flats completed reportedly by state media. A 5th stage of the Hwasong area broke ground immediately after.

In 2026 the Memorial Museum of Combat Feats at the Overseas Military Operations opened in Hwasong District alongside with some residential projects.

Pyongyang, alongside Seoul, launched a bid to host the 2032 Summer Olympics, but failed to make the joint city candidate list.

== Geography ==
Pyongyang is in the west-central part of North Korea; the city lies on a flat plain about 50 kilometers (31 mi) east of the Korea Bay, an arm of the Yellow Sea. The Taedong River flows southwestward through the city toward the Korea Bay. The Pyongyang plain, where the city is situated, is one of the two large plains on the Western coast of the Korean peninsula, the other being the Chaeryong plain. Both have an area of approximately 500 square kilometers.

=== Climate ===
Pyongyang has a hot-summer continental monsoon climate (Köppen: Dwa), featuring warm to hot, humid summers and cold, dry winters. Cold, dry winds can blow from Siberia in winter, making conditions very cold; the low temperature is usually below freezing between November and early March, although the average daytime high is at least a few degrees above freezing in every month except January. The winter is generally much drier than summer, with snow falling for 37 days on average.

The transition from the cold, dry winter to the warm, wet summer occurs rather quickly between April and early May, and there is a similarly abrupt return to winter conditions in late October and November. Summers are generally hot and humid, with the East Asian monsoon taking place from June until September; these are also the hottest months, with average temperatures of 21 to 25 °C (70 to 77 °F), and daytime highs often above 30 °C (86 °F). Although largely transitional seasons, spring and autumn experience more pleasant weather, with average high temperatures ranging from 20 to 26 °C (68 to 79 °F) in May and 22 to 27 °C (72 to 81 °F) in September, coupled with relatively clear, sunny skies.

Climate data for Pyongyang (1991–2020 normals, extremes 1961–present)
| Month | Jan | Feb | Mar | Apr | May | Jun | Jul | Aug | Sep | Oct | Nov | Dec | Year |
|---|---|---|---|---|---|---|---|---|---|---|---|---|---|
| Record high °C (°F) | 12.0 (53.6) | 17.3 (63.1) | 22.5 (72.5) | 29.1 (84.4) | 34.0 (93.2) | 35.8 (96.4) | 36.9 (98.4) | 37.9 (100.2) | 33.5 (92.3) | 30.0 (86.0) | 26.0 (78.8) | 15.0 (59.0) | 37.9 (100.2) |
| Mean daily maximum °C (°F) | −0.4 (31.3) | 3.1 (37.6) | 9.7 (49.5) | 17.6 (63.7) | 23.5 (74.3) | 27.5 (81.5) | 29.1 (84.4) | 29.6 (85.3) | 25.7 (78.3) | 18.8 (65.8) | 9.7 (49.5) | 1.4 (34.5) | 16.3 (61.3) |
| Daily mean °C (°F) | −5.4 (22.3) | −2.0 (28.4) | 4.0 (39.2) | 11.4 (52.5) | 17.4 (63.3) | 21.9 (71.4) | 24.7 (76.5) | 25.0 (77.0) | 20.2 (68.4) | 12.9 (55.2) | 4.8 (40.6) | −2.9 (26.8) | 11.0 (51.8) |
| Mean daily minimum °C (°F) | −9.8 (14.4) | −6.6 (20.1) | −0.9 (30.4) | 5.9 (42.6) | 12.0 (53.6) | 17.4 (63.3) | 21.4 (70.5) | 21.5 (70.7) | 15.6 (60.1) | 7.8 (46.0) | 0.5 (32.9) | −6.8 (19.8) | 6.5 (43.7) |
| Record low °C (°F) | −26.5 (−15.7) | −23.4 (−10.1) | −16.1 (3.0) | −6.1 (21.0) | 2.2 (36.0) | 7.0 (44.6) | 11.1 (52.0) | 12.0 (53.6) | 3.6 (38.5) | −6.0 (21.2) | −14.0 (6.8) | −22.8 (−9.0) | −26.5 (−15.7) |
| Average precipitation mm (inches) | 9.6 (0.38) | 14.5 (0.57) | 23.9 (0.94) | 44.8 (1.76) | 74.7 (2.94) | 90.2 (3.55) | 274.7 (10.81) | 209.6 (8.25) | 90.8 (3.57) | 47.2 (1.86) | 38.4 (1.51) | 18.0 (0.71) | 936.4 (36.87) |
| Average precipitation days (≥ 0.1 mm) | 3.9 | 3.7 | 4.2 | 5.8 | 7.1 | 7.9 | 12.5 | 10.1 | 6.3 | 5.8 | 7.1 | 5.7 | 80.1 |
| Average snowy days | 5.4 | 4.0 | 1.8 | 0.3 | 0.0 | 0.0 | 0.0 | 0.0 | 0.0 | 0.1 | 1.9 | 5.5 | 19.0 |
| Average relative humidity (%) | 69.1 | 65.0 | 62.5 | 60.4 | 65.3 | 72.2 | 81.1 | 80.6 | 75.3 | 72.0 | 72.2 | 70.6 | 70.5 |
| Mean monthly sunshine hours | 184 | 197 | 231 | 237 | 263 | 229 | 181 | 204 | 222 | 214 | 165 | 165 | 2,492 |
| Average ultraviolet index | 2 | 3 | 4 | 6 | 7 | 8 | 9 | 9 | 7 | 4 | 2 | 1 | 5 |
Source 1: Korea Meteorological Administration
Source 2: Pogodaiklimat.ru (extremes), Deutscher Wetterdienst (sun, 1961–1990) and Weather Atlas

== Politics ==
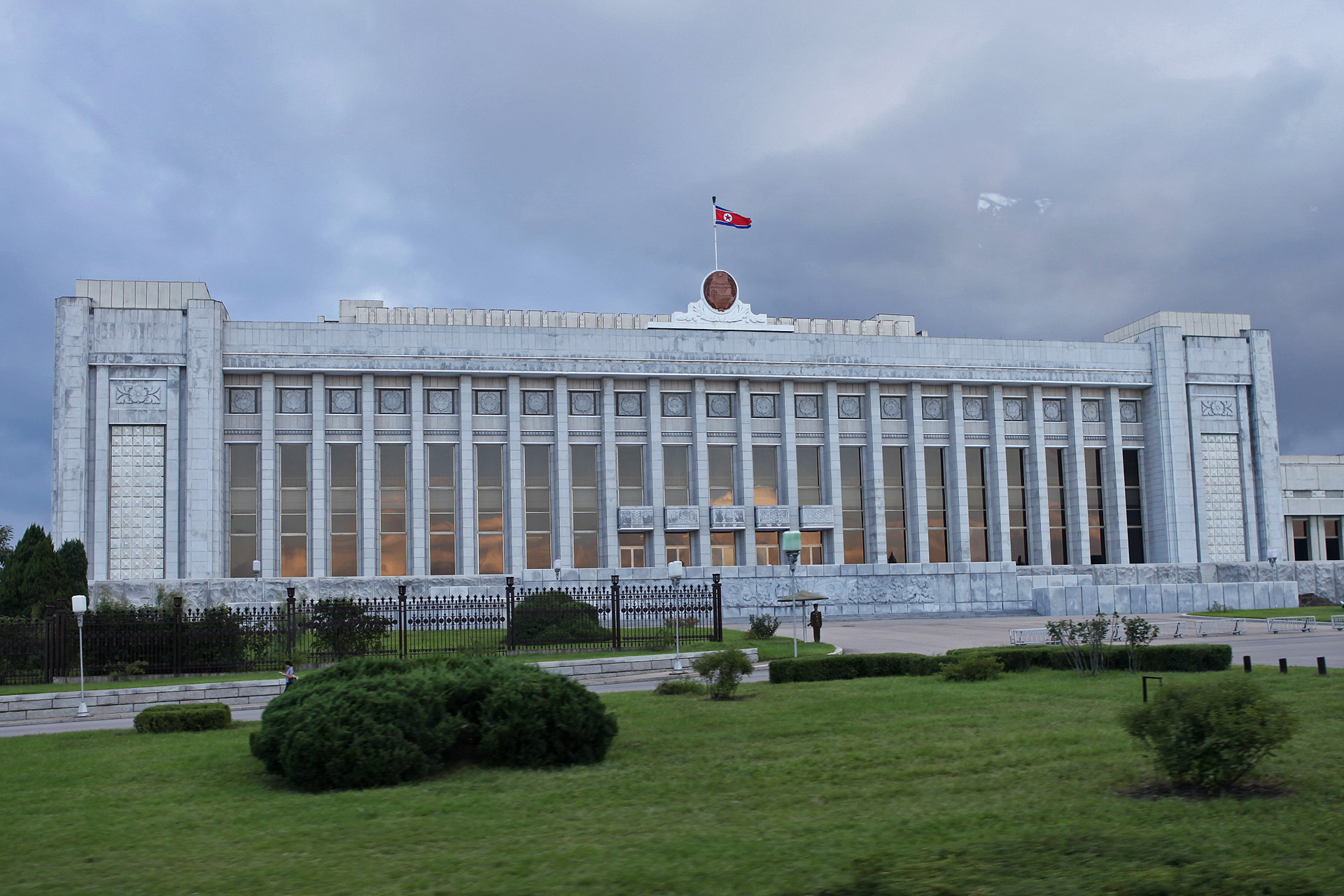
Pyongyang Assembly Hall, seat of the Supreme People's Assembly, the North Korean parliament

Major government and other public offices are located in Pyongyang, which is constitutionally designated as the country's capital. The seat of the Workers' Party Central Committee and the Pyongyang City People's Committee are located in Haebangsan-dong, Chung-guyok. The Cabinet of North Korea is located in Jongro-dong, Chung-guyok.

Pyongyang is also the seat of all major North Korean security institutions. The largest of them, the Ministry of Social Security, has 130,000 employees working in 12 bureaus. These oversee activities including: police services, security of party officials, classified documents, census, civil registrations, large-scale public construction, traffic control, fire safety, civil defence, public health and customs. Another significant structure based in the city is the National Intelligence Agency, whose 30,000 personnel manage intelligence, political prison systems, military industrial security and entry and exit management.

The politics and management of the city is dominated by the Workers' Party of Korea, as they are in the national level. The city is managed by the Pyongyang Party Committee of the Workers' Party of Korea, and its chairman is the de facto mayor. The formal municipal legislature (parliament) and local state organ of power is the Pyongyang City People's Assembly. Its standing state organ is the Pyongyang City People's Committee, responsible for day-to-day administration and running of the city. This includes following local Party guidance as channeled through the Pyongyang Party Committee, the distribution of resources prioritised to Pyongyang, and providing support to WPK and internal security agency personnel and families.

== Administrative status and divisions ==
P'yŏngyang is divided into 19 districts (or wards) (ku- or guyŏk) (the city proper), 2 counties (kun or gun), and 1 neighborhood (dong).

- Chung-guyok (중구역; 中區域)
- Pyongchon-guyok (평천구역; 平川區域)
- Potonggang-guyok (보통강구역; 普通江區域)
- Moranbong-guyok (모란봉구역; 牡丹峰區域)
- Sŏsŏng-guyŏk (서성구역; 西城區域)
- Songyo-guyok (선교구역; 船橋區域)
- Tongdaewŏn-guyŏk (동대원구역; 東大院區域)
- Taedonggang-guyŏk (대동강구역; 大同江區域)
- Sadong-guyŏk (사동구역; 寺洞區域)
- Taesong-guyok (대성구역; 大城區域)
- Mangyongdae-guyok (만경대구역; 萬景台區域)
- Hyongjesan-guyok (형제산구역; 兄弟山區域)
- Hwasong-guyok (화성구역; 和盛區域)
- Ryongsong-guyok (룡성구역; 龍城區域)
- Samsok-guyok (삼석구역; 三石區域)
- Ryokpo-guyok (력포구역; 力浦區域)
- Rakrang-guyok (락랑구역; 樂浪區域)
- Sunan-guyŏk (순안구역; 順安區域)
- Unjong-guyok (은정구역; 恩情區域)
- Kangdong County (강동군; 江東郡)
- Kangnam County (강남군; 江南郡)
- Panghyŏn-dong (방현동; 方峴洞)

Foreign media reports in 2010 stated that Kangnam-gun, Chunghwa-gun, Sangwŏn-gun, and Sŭngho-guyŏk had been transferred to the administration of neighboring North Hwanghae Province. However, Kangnam-gun was returned to Pyongyang in 2011.

Panghyŏn-dong, a missile base, was administrated by Kusong, North Pyongan Province. It was transferred to the administration of P'yŏngyang on 10 February 2018.

== Cityscape ==
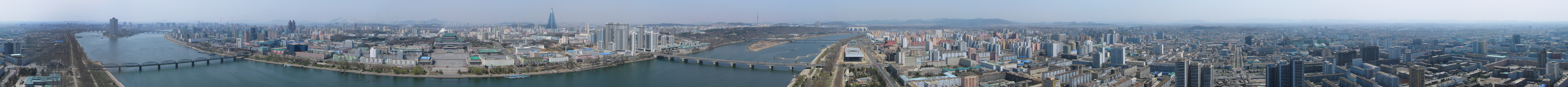
Panorama of Pyongyang, as seen from the Juche Tower in April 2012

After being destroyed during the Korean War, Pyongyang was entirely rebuilt according to Kim Il Sung's vision, which was to create a capital that would boost morale in the post-war years. The result was a city with wide, tree-lined boulevards and public buildings with terraced landscaping, mosaics and decorated ceilings. Its Soviet-style architecture makes it reminiscent of a Siberian city during winter snowfall, although edifices of traditional Korean design somewhat soften this perception. In summer, it is notable for its rivers, willow trees, flowers and parkland.

Since the end of the Korean War the city was planned strictly according to Socialist principles. According to the 1953 master plan designed by Kim Jung-hee, the city was planned to reach one-million residents stretching from the Taedong River to the Pothong River. The city center was planned as the main administrative district, with major landscape structures constructed in between districts to be used as buffer zones so that they cannot expand freely. The city center was planned with wide avenues and monumental structures; it forms the central administrative district where many government and public buildings are located, including the Government Complex No. 1, which houses the headquarters of the ruling party. Together with various monuments and memorials, it forms an important axis of symbolic places which promote the ideology of the Workers' Party of Korea and the North Korean cult of personality around the Kim family. The epicentre and Kilometre zero of the central district is located at Kim Il Sung Square.

The 1953 master plan set the basic layout from which the city's development was derived in the next decades, with a unit district system that mixed residential and industrial zoning. Those districts are spread around the central administrative district and together with it form the key axis of directionality for city expansion. While in the 50s, major emphasis was placed on the careful reconstruction of Pyongyang from ruins into a socialist city in strict alignment with the master plan, the 60s and 70s saw new waves of development which included expansion of the central boulevards, construction of high-density apartment buildings along the central boulevards, grandiose civic and cultural buildings and monumental statues and squares. This tendency also involved the inclusion of traditional Korean architectural elements for some buildings. While development generally followed the 1953 master plan, it diverged in some respects, such as in the construction of high-rises along the central avenues, a step which conflicted with the plan, which called for a more even distribution of residential construction throughout the city in several multi-cores. The 90s saw a relative slowdown in urban development due to the deep economic crisis and famine which swept through North Korea, leading to the diversion of resources to the army. The 2010s and 2020s saw renewed efforts at urbanization, with increasing density through the reconstruction of streets located further from the center and transformation of former rural parts of the city into high density residential districts.

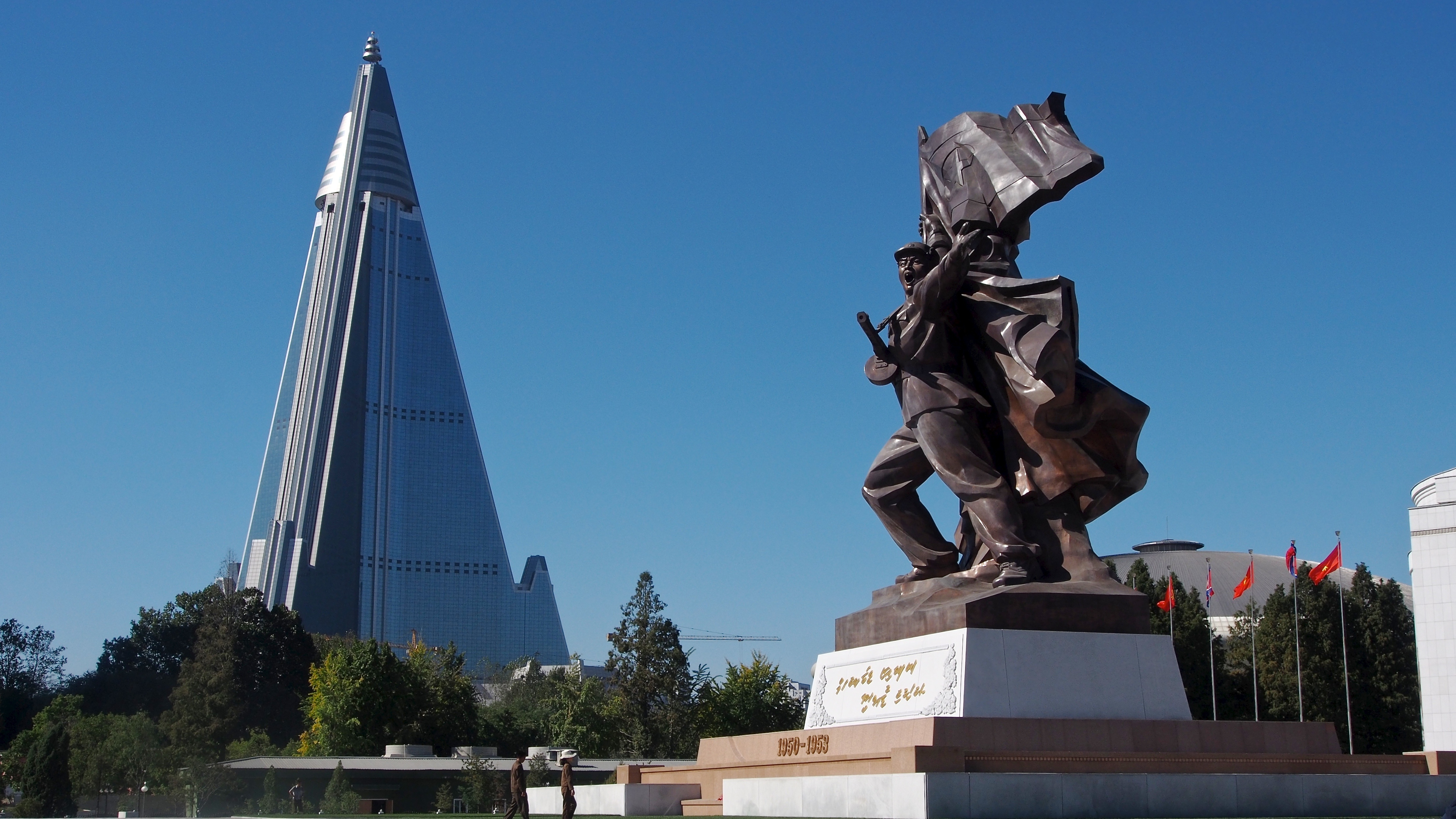
Ryugyong Hotel and part of the Monument to the Victorious Fatherland Liberation War

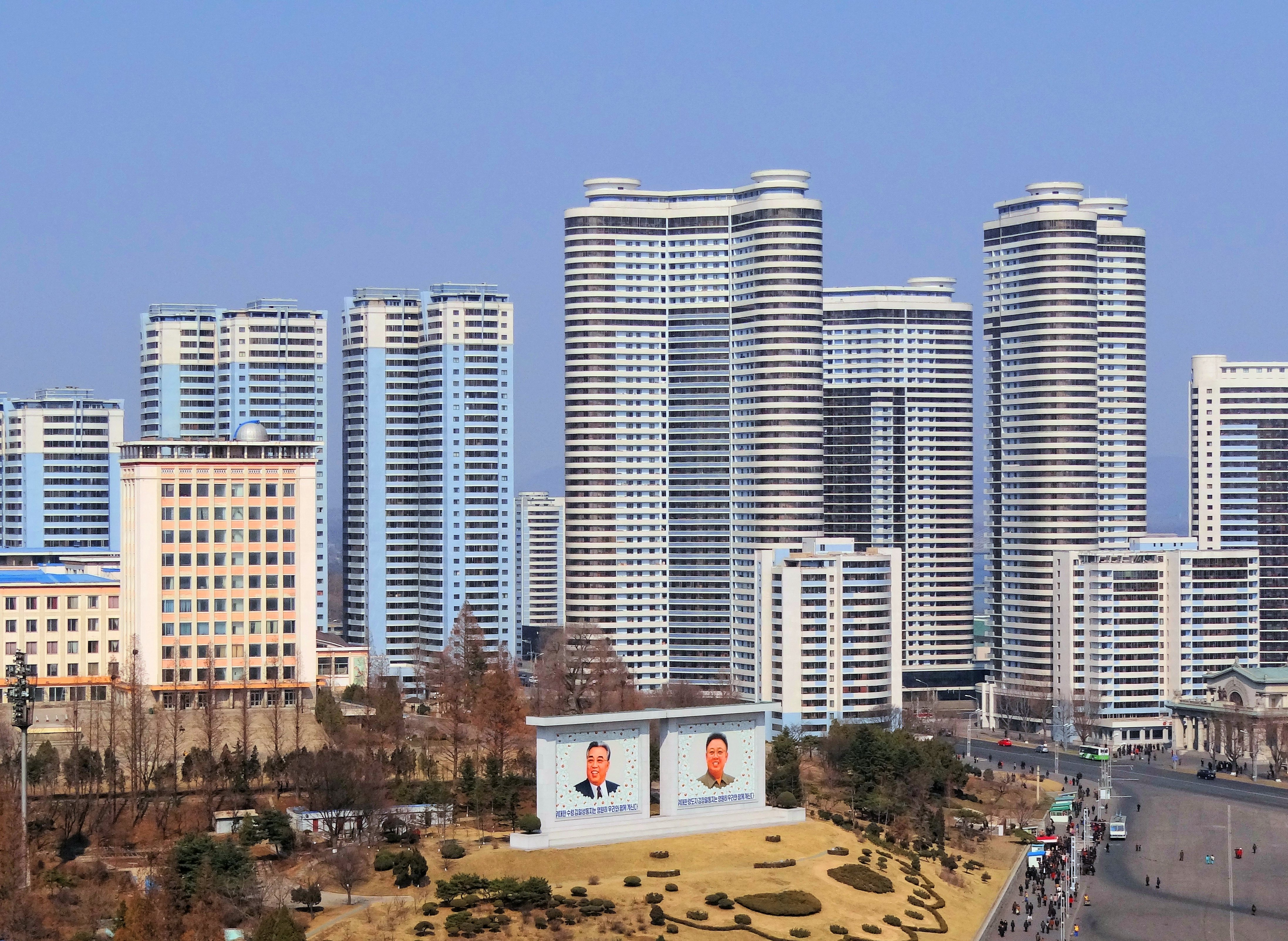
The Mansudae Apartments residential complex with green areas.

The streets are laid out in a north–south, east–west grid, giving the city an orderly appearance. North Korean designers applied the Swedish experience of self-sufficient urban neighbourhoods throughout the entire country, and Pyongyang is no exception. Its inhabitants are mostly divided into administrative units of 5,000 to 6,000 people (dong). These units all have similar sets of amenities, including a food store, a barber shop, a tailor, a public bathhouse, a post office, a clinic, a library and others. Many residents occupy high-rise apartment buildings. One of Kim Il Sung's priorities while designing Pyongyang was to limit the population. Authorities maintain a restrictive regime of movement into the city, making it atypical of East Asia as it is silent, uncrowded and spacious.

Structures in Pyongyang are divided into three major architectural categories: monuments, buildings with traditional Korean motifs and high-rises. Some of North Korea's most recognisable landmarks are monuments, like the Juche Tower, the Arch of Triumph and the Mansu Hill Grand Monument. The first of them is a 170-meter (560-foot) granite spire symbolizing the Juche ideology. It was completed in 1982 and contains 25,550 granite blocks, one for each day of Kim Il Sung's life up to that point. The most prominent building on Pyongyang's skyline is Ryugyong Hotel, the seventh highest building in the world in terms of floor count, the tallest unoccupied building in the world, and one of the tallest hotels in the world. It has yet to open.

Pyongyang has a rapidly evolving skyline, dominated by high-rise apartment buildings. A construction boom began with the Changjon Street Apartment Complex, which was completed in 2012. Construction of the complex began after late leader Kim Jong Il described Changjon Street as "pitiful". Other housing complexes are being upgraded as well, but most are still poorly insulated, without elevators or central heating. An urban renewal program continued under Kim Jong Un's leadership, with the old apartments of the 1970s and '80s replaced by taller high rise buildings and leisure parks like the Kaesong Youth Park, as well as renovations of older buildings. In 2018, the city was described as unrecognizable compared to five years before.

=== Landmarks ===
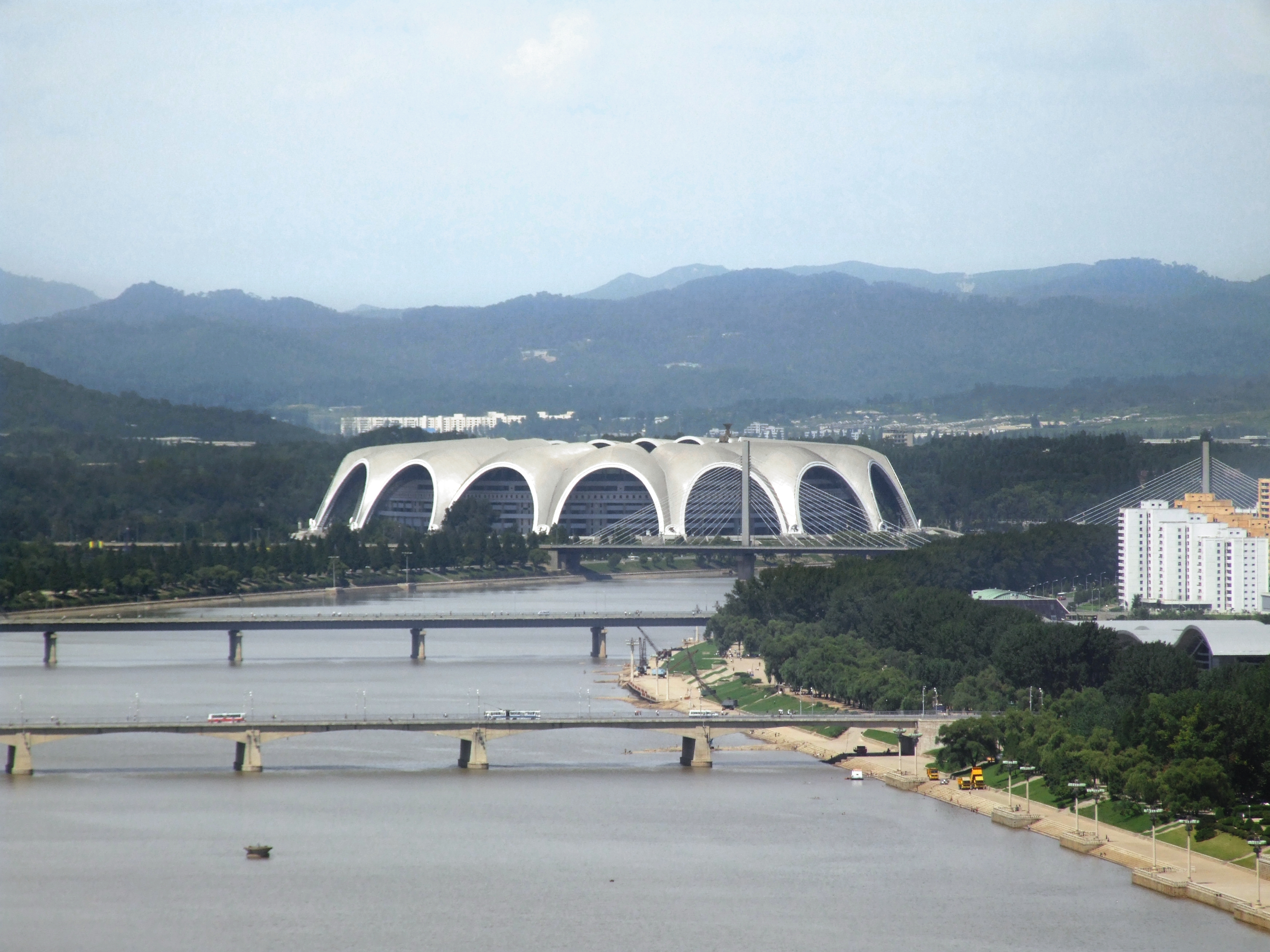
The Rungrado 1st of May Stadium by the Taedong River is the second-largest mass-sports/athletic stadium in the world by capacity.

Notable landmarks in the city include:

- The Ryugyong Hotel
- The Kumsusan Palace of the Sun
- The Arch of Triumph (heavily inspired by, but larger than, the Arc de Triomphe in Paris)
- The birthplace of Kim Il Sung at Mangyongdae Hill at the city outskirts
- Juche Tower, a monument to the philosophy of Juche (self-reliance)
- Two large stadiums:
  - Rungrado 1st of May Stadium (the second largest stadium in the world by seating capacity)
  - Kim Il Sung Stadium
- The Mansu Hill complex, including the Korean Revolution Museum
- Kim Il Sung Square
- Yanggakdo International Hotel

Pyongyang TV Tower is a minor landmark. Other visitor attractions include the Korea Central Zoo. The Pyongyang–Kaesong Motorway stretches from Pyongyang to the Korean Demilitarized Zone (DMZ).

Monuments and sights of Pyongyang

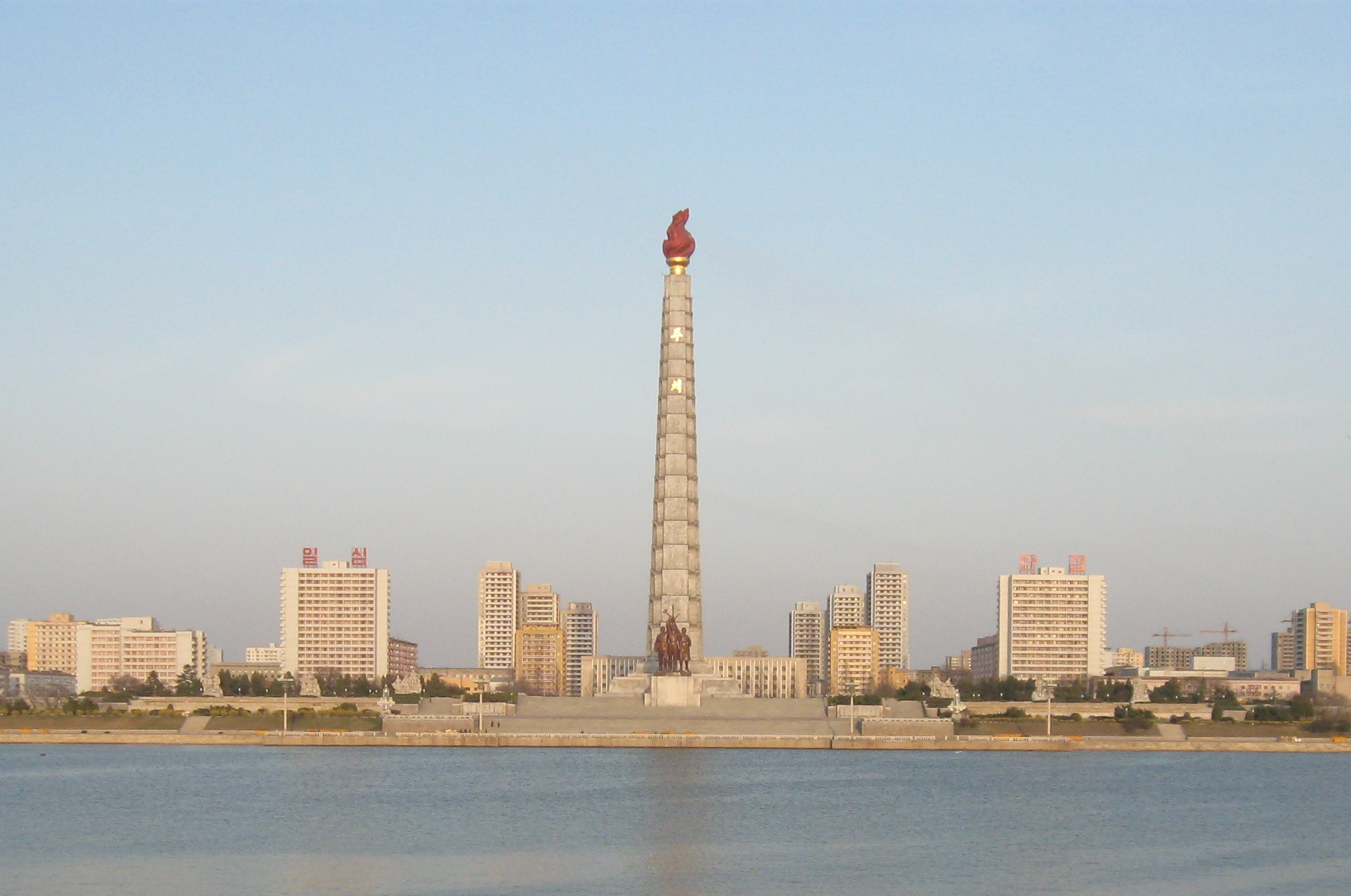
Juche Tower

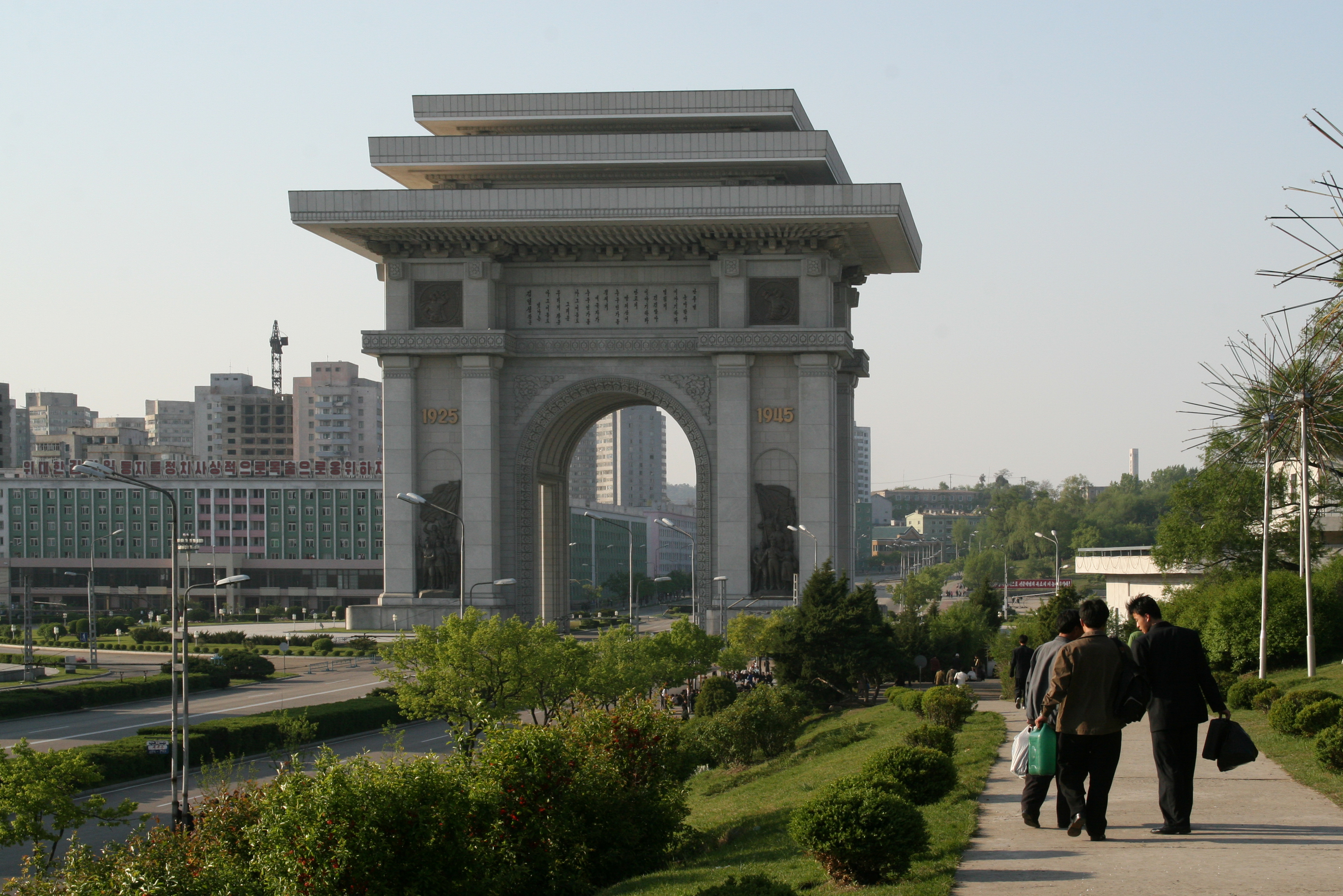
Arch of Triumph

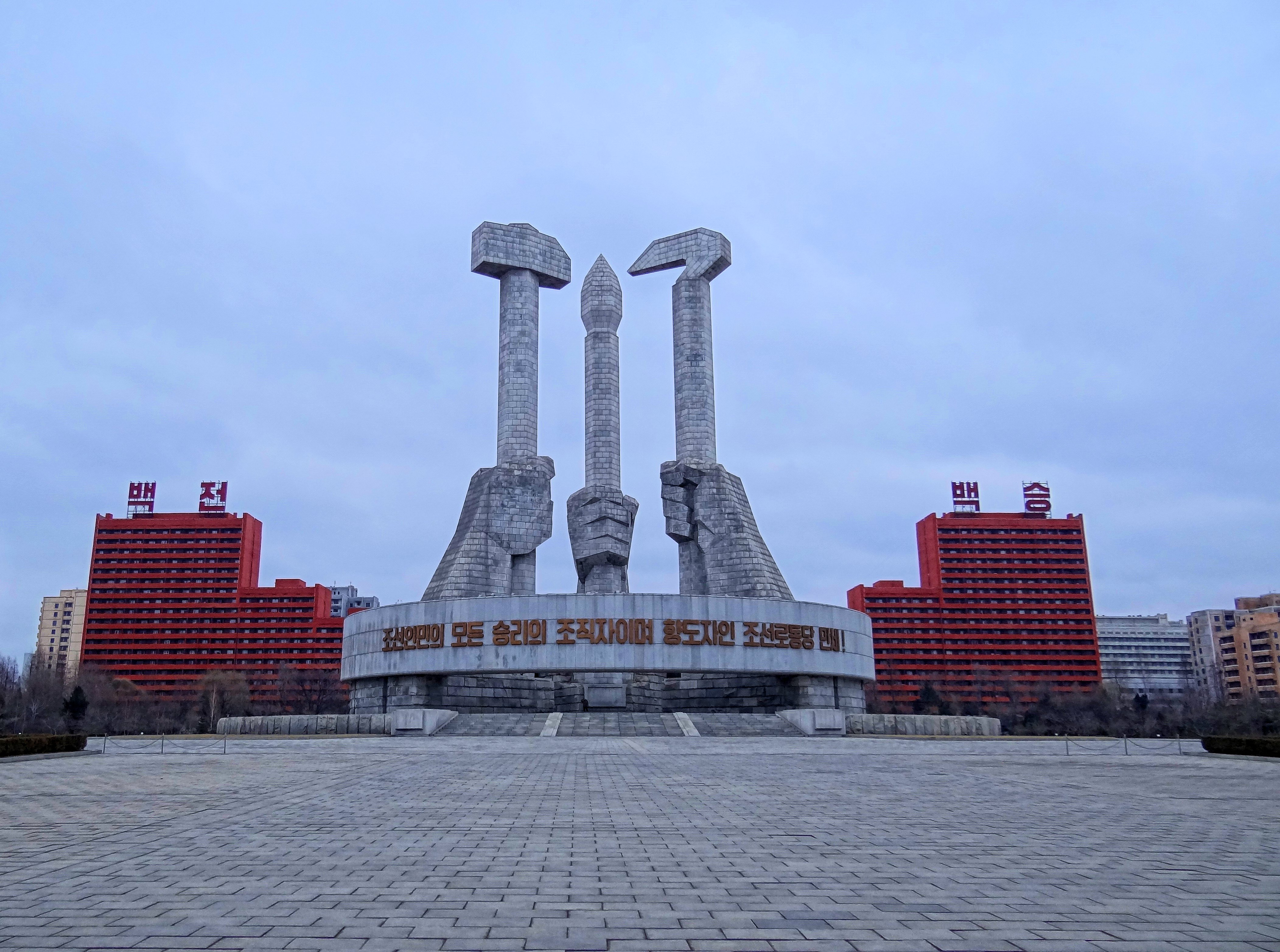
Monument to Party Founding

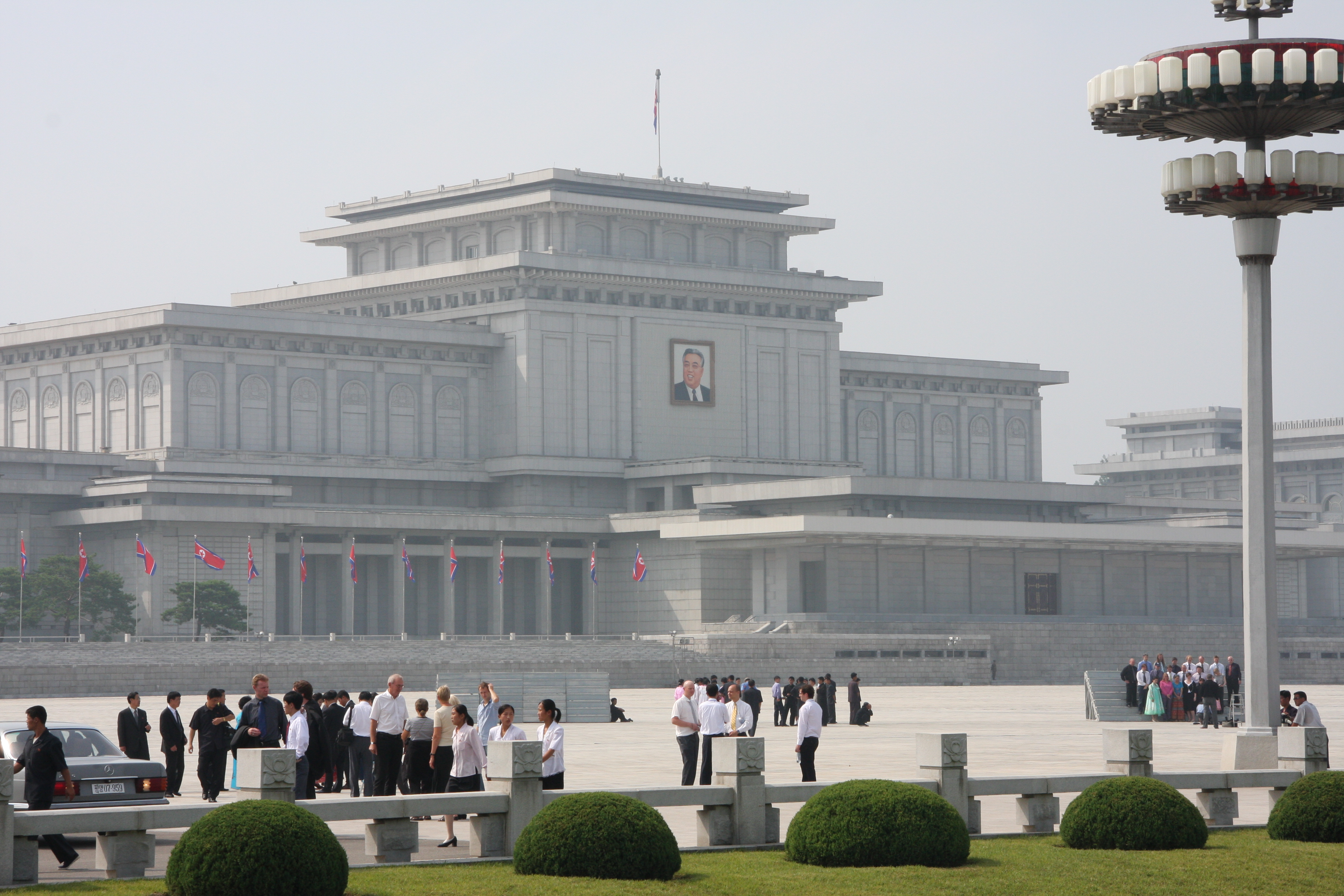
Kumsusan Palace of the Sun

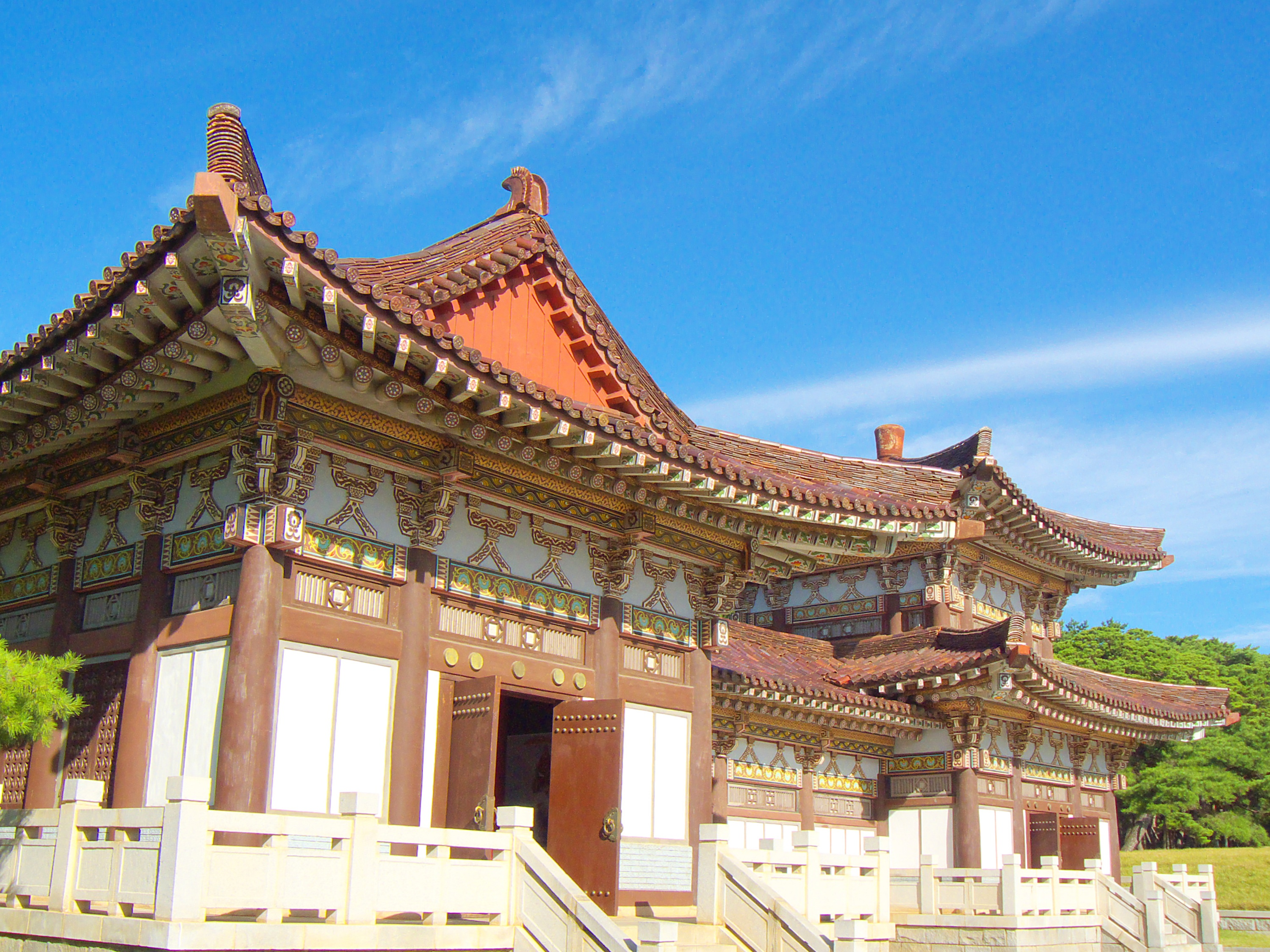
Tomb of King Tongmyeong

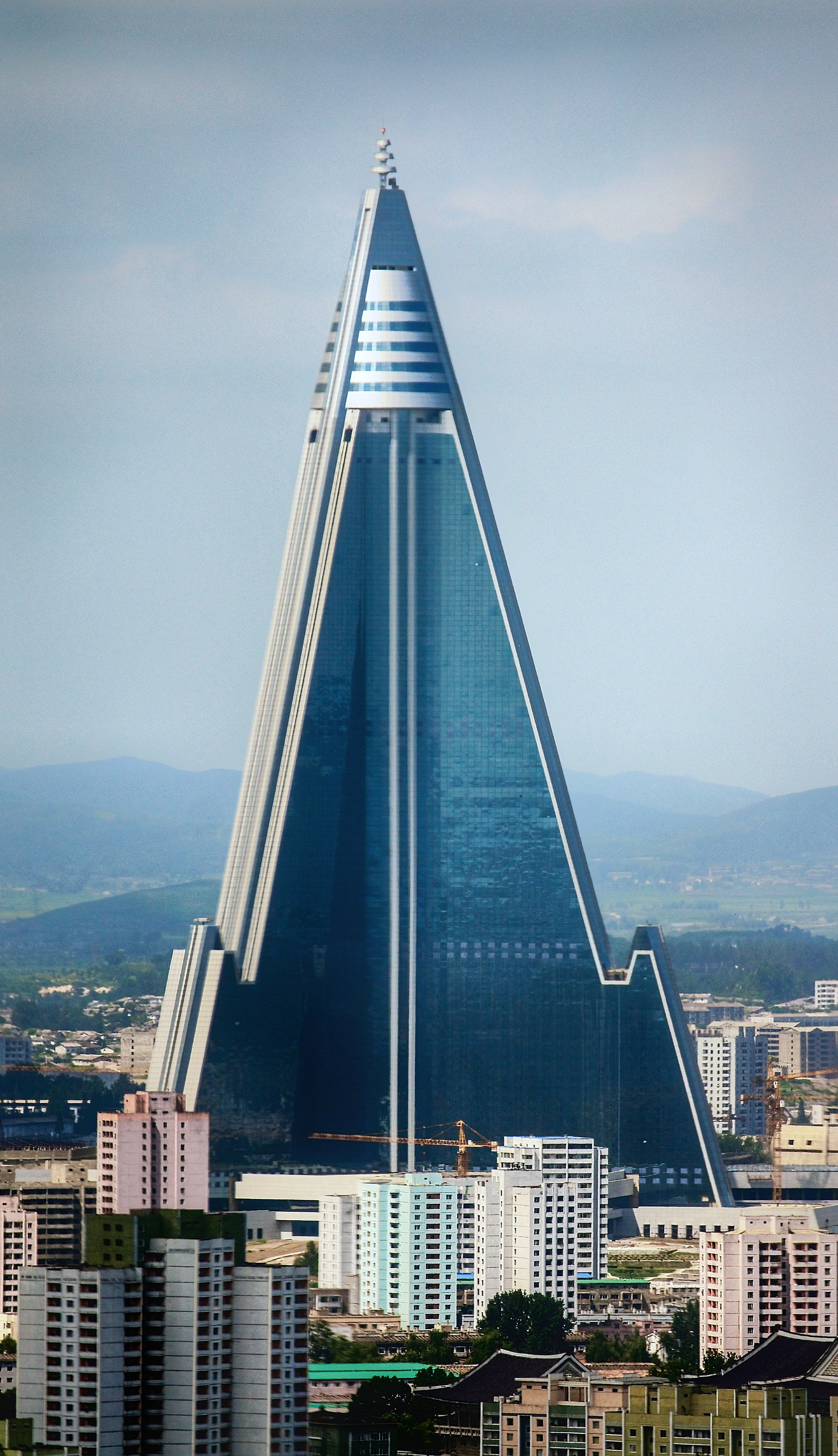
Ryugyong Hotel

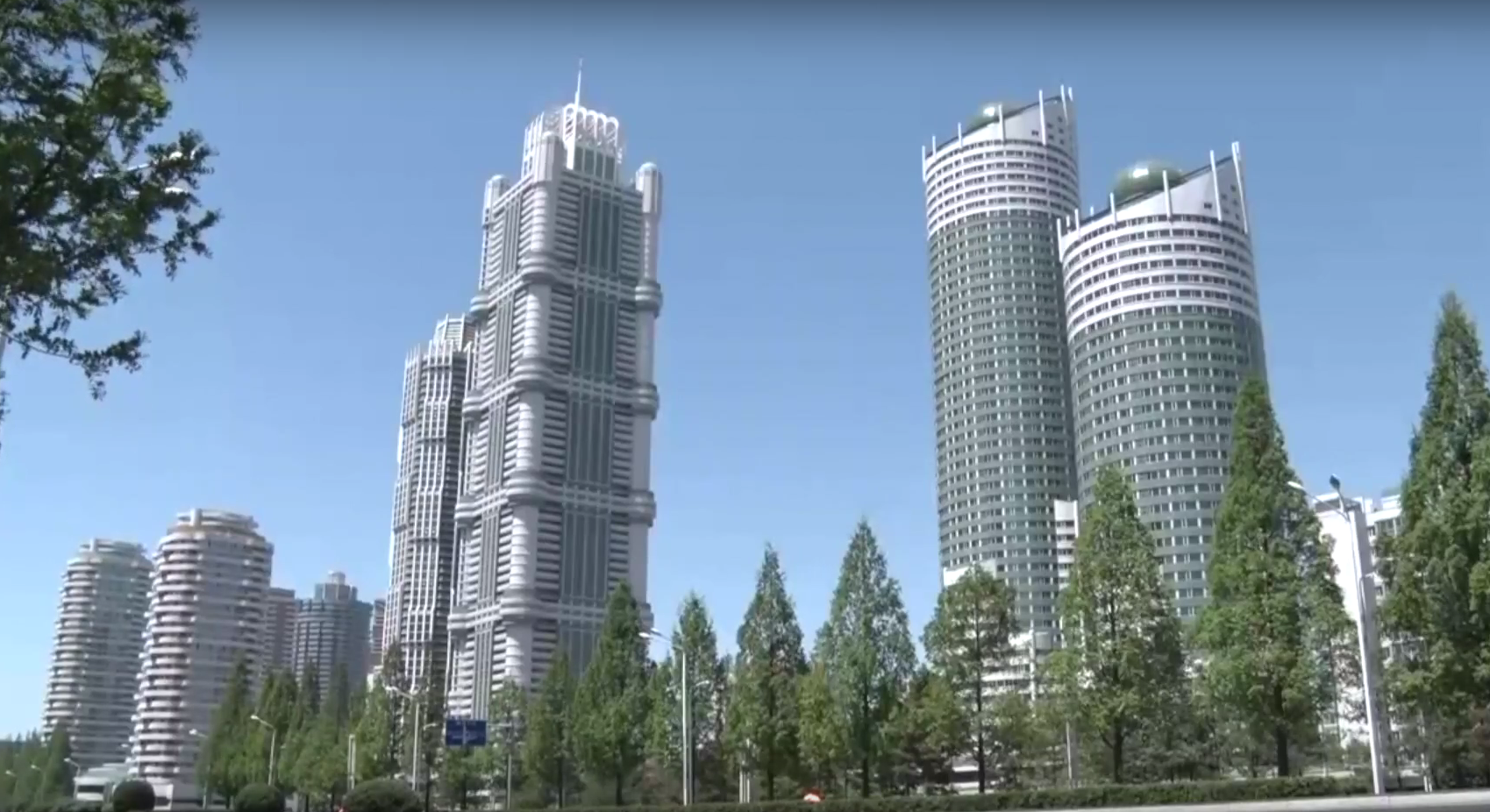
Ryomyong New Town

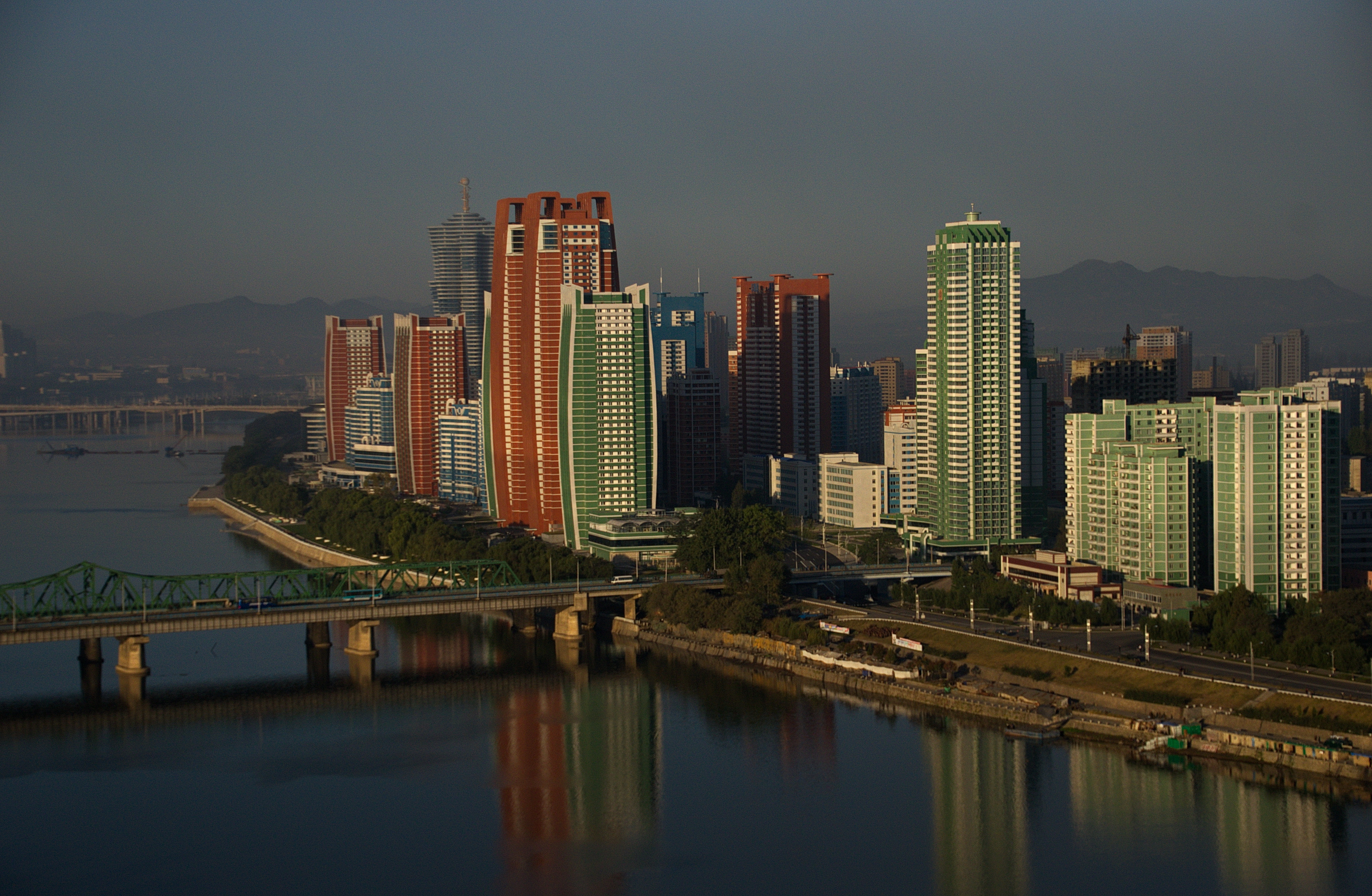
Mirae Scientists Street

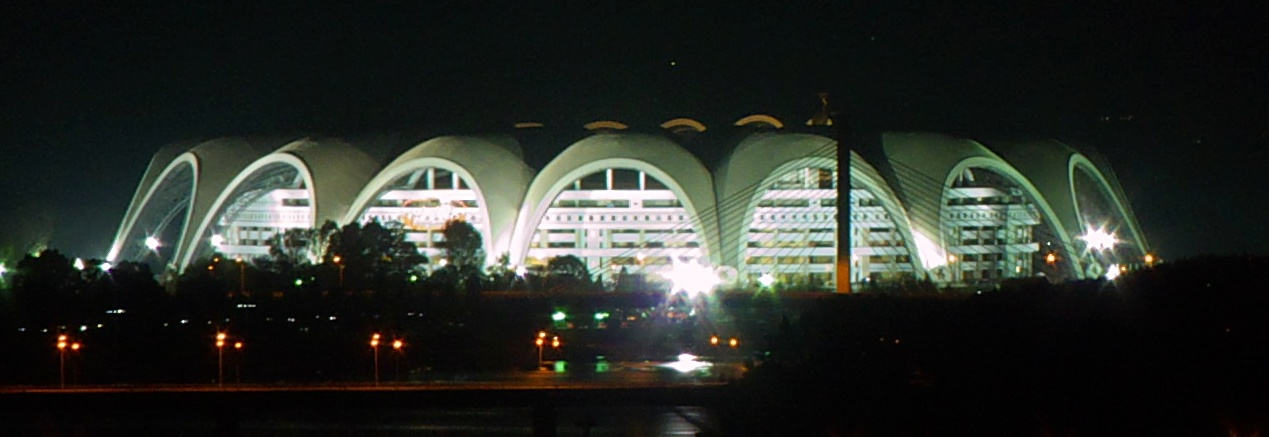
Rungrado 1st of May Stadium

== Culture ==
=== Cuisine ===
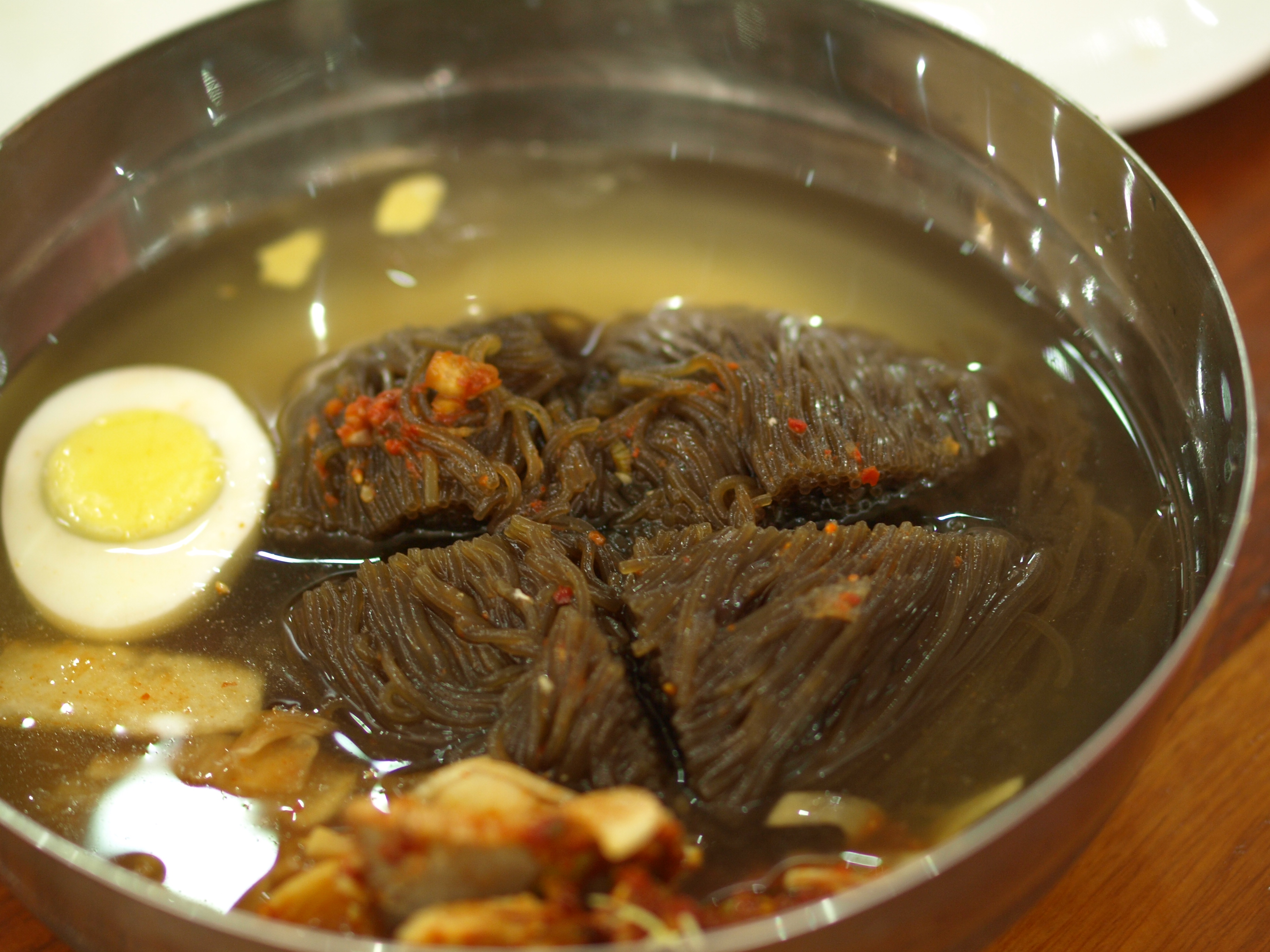
Pyongyang raengmyŏn (Korean: 평양랭면; Hanja: 平壤冷麵), cold buckwheat noodle soup originating in Pyongyang

Pyongyang served as the provincial capital of South Pyongan Province until 1946, and Pyongyang cuisine is part of the general culinary tradition of the Pyongan province. The most famous local food is Pyongyang raengmyŏn, or also called mul raengmyŏn or just simply raengmyŏn. Raengmyŏn literally means "cold noodles", while the affix mul refers to water because the dish is served in a cold broth. Raengmyŏn consists of thin and chewy buckwheat noodles in a cold meat-broth with dongchimi (watery kimchi) and topped with a slice of sweet Korean pear.

Pyongyang raengmyŏn was originally eaten in homes built with ondol (traditional underfloor heating) during the cold winter, so it is also called "Pyongyang deoldeori" (shivering in Pyongyang). Pyongyang locals sometimes enjoy it as a haejangguk, which is any type of food eaten as a hangover cure, usually a warm soup.

Another representative Pyongyang dish, Taedonggang sungeoguk, translates as "flathead grey mullet soup from the Taedong River". The soup features flathead grey mullet (abundant in the Taedong River) along with black peppercorns and salt. Traditionally, it has been served to guests visiting Pyongyang. Therefore, there is a common saying, "How good was the trout soup?", which is used to greet people returning from Pyongyang. Another local specialty, Pyongyang onban (literally "warm rice of Pyongyang"), comprises freshly cooked rice topped with sliced mushrooms, chicken, and a couple of bindaetteok (pancakes made from ground mung beans and vegetables).

=== Social life ===
In 2018, there were many high-quality restaurants in Pyongyang with Korean and international food, and imported alcoholic beverages. Famous restaurants include Okryu-gwan and Ch'ongryugwan. Some street food exists in Pyongyang, where vendors operate food stalls. Foreign foods like hamburgers, fries, pizza, and coffee are easily found. There is an active nightlife with late-night restaurants and karaoke.

The city has water parks, amusement parks, skating rinks, health clubs, a shooting range, and a dolphinarium.

== Sports ==
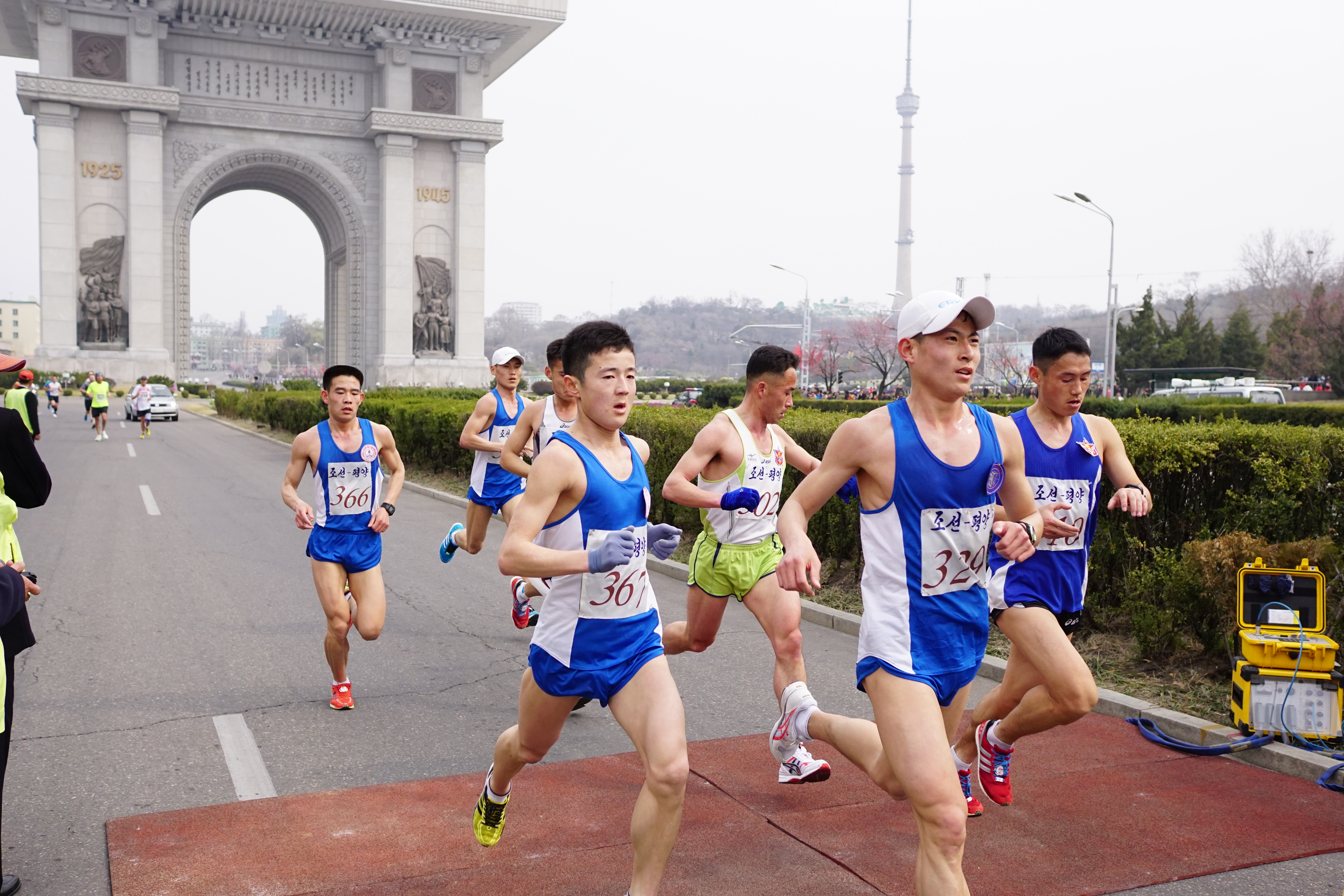
Participants in the 2015 Pyongyang Marathon running past the Arch of Triumph

Pyongyang has a number of sports clubs, including the April 25 Sports Club and the Pyongyang City Sports Club.

== Economy ==
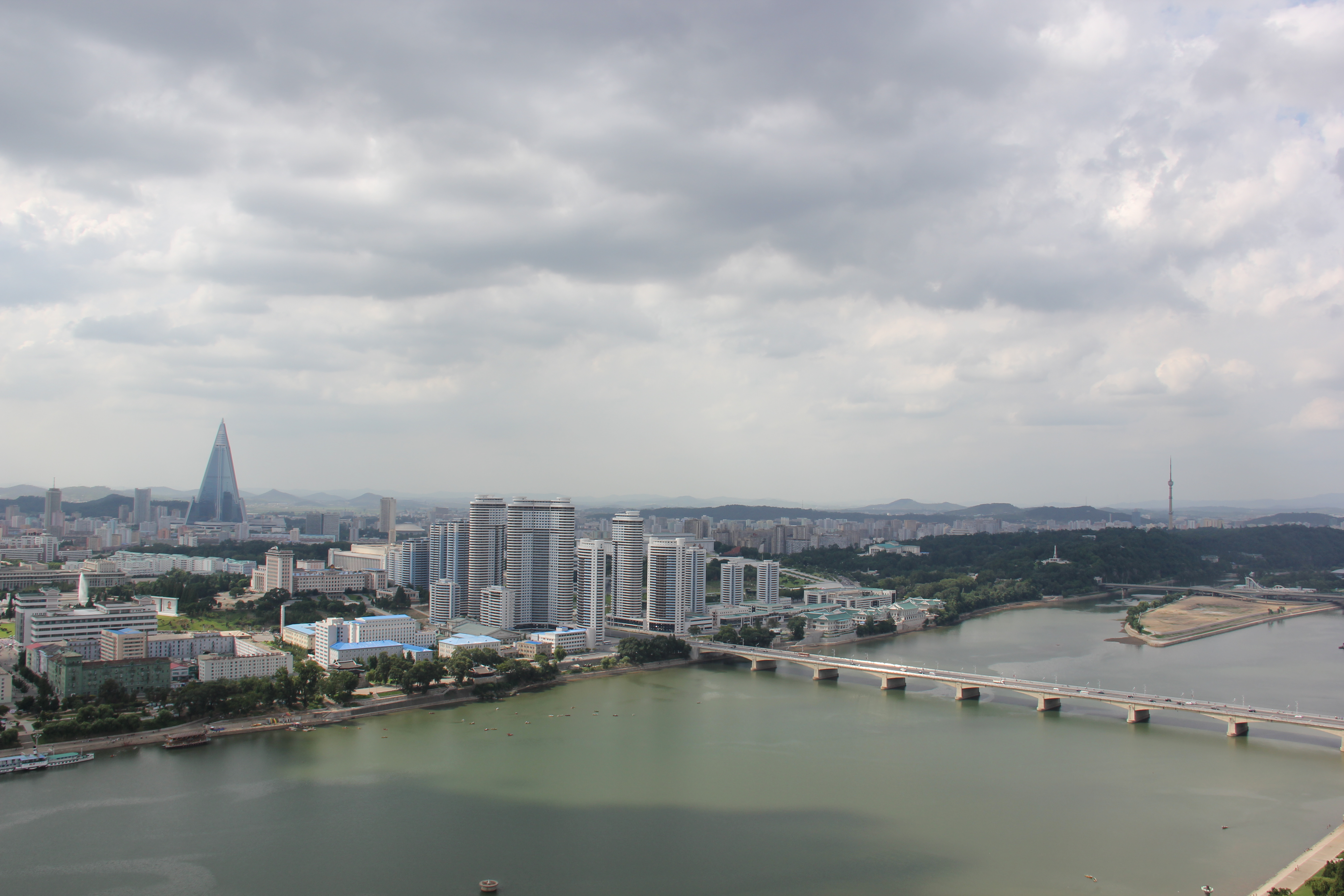
Central Pyongyang with the newly built Changjon Apartment Complex. The Ryugyong Hotel and Okryu Bridge are in the background

Pyongyang is North Korea's industrial center because of the abundance of natural resources like coal, iron and limestone, as well as good land and water transport systems. Pyongyang was the first industrial city to emerge in North Korea after the Korean War. Light and heavy industries are both present and have developed in parallel. Heavy manufactures include cement, industrial ceramics, munitions and weapons, but mechanical engineering remains the core industry. Light industries in Pyongyang and its vicinity include textiles, footwear and food, among others. Special emphasis is put on the production and supply of fresh produce and subsidiary crops in farms on the city's outskirts. Other crops include rice, sweetcorn and soybeans. Pyongyang aims to achieve self-sufficiency in meat production. High-density facilities raise pigs, chicken and other livestock.

Until the late 2010s, Pyongyang still experienced frequent shortages of electricity. To solve this problem, two power stations – Huichon Power Stations 1 and 2 – were built in Chagang Province and supply the city through direct transmission lines. A second phase of the power expansion project was launched in January 2013, consisting of a series of small dams along the Chongchon River. The first two power stations have a maximum generating capacity of 300 megawatts (MW), while the 10 dams to be built under the second phase are expected to generate about 120 MW. In addition, the city has several existing or planned thermal power stations. These include Pyongyang TPS with a capacity of 500 MW, East Pyongyang TPS with a capacity of 50 MW, and Kangdong TPS which is under construction.

=== Retail ===
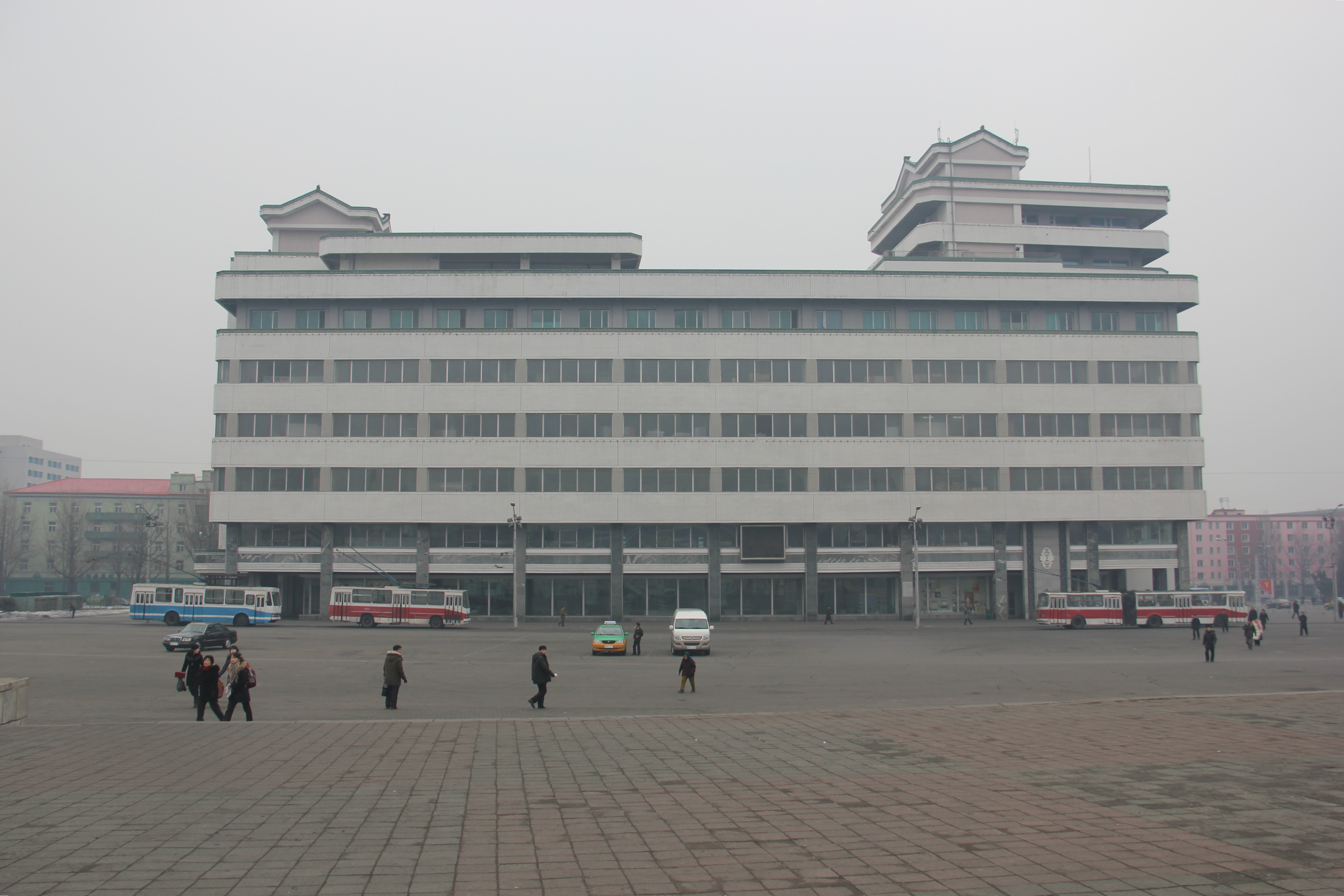
Pyongyang Department Store No. 1

Pyongyang is home to several large department stores including the Pothonggang Department Store, Pyongyang Department Store No. 1, Pyongyang Department Store No. 2, Kwangbok Department Store, Ragwon Department Store, Pyongyang Station Department Store, and the Pyongyang Children's Department Store.

The city also has Hwanggumbol Shop, a chain of state-owned convenience stores supplying goods at prices cheaper than those in the jangmadang markets. Hwanggumbol Shops are specifically designed to control North Korea's expanding markets by attracting consumers and guaranteeing the circulation of money in government-operated stores.

=== Transportation ===
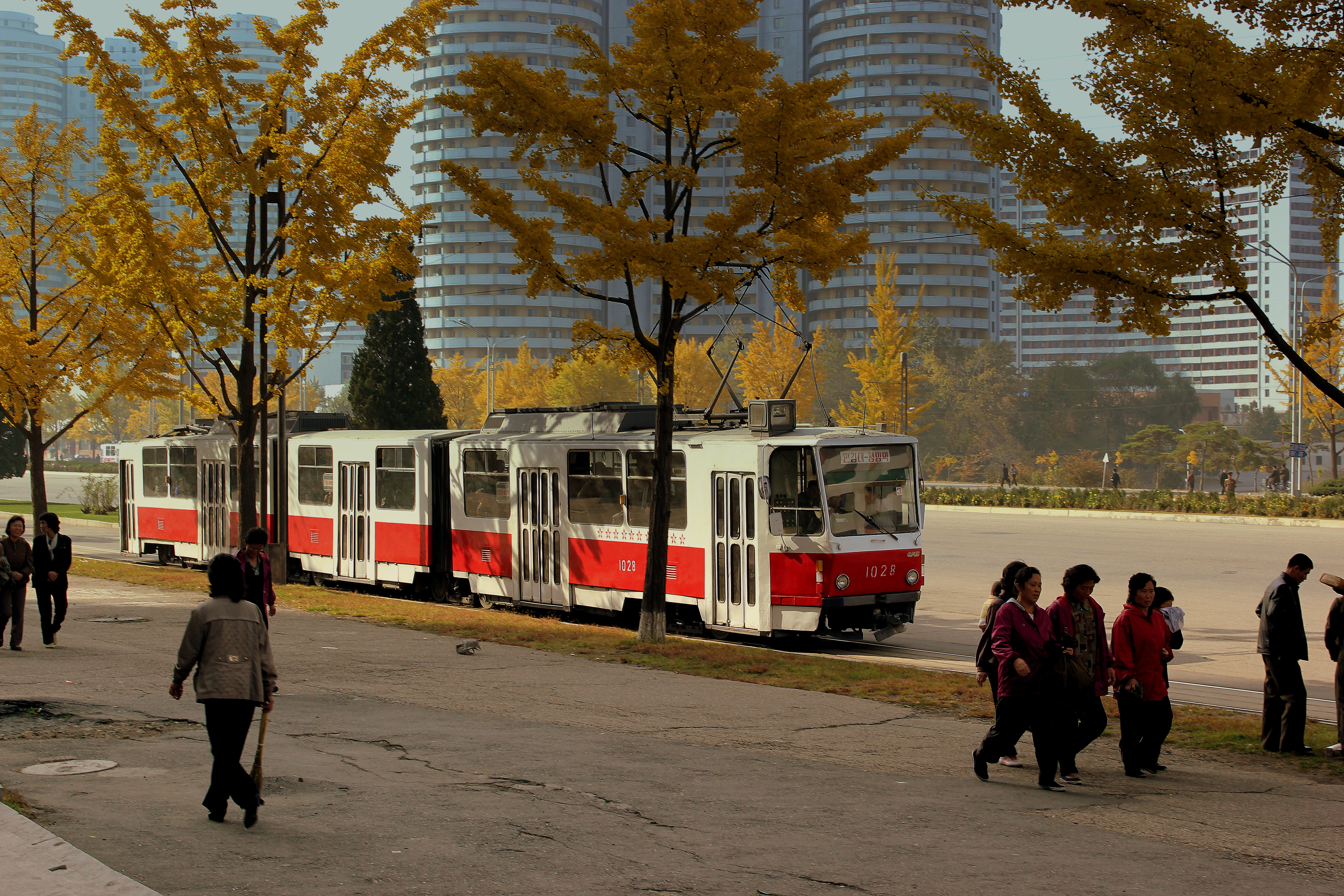
Tatra KT8D5K tram

Pyongyang is the main transport hub of the country: it has a network of roads, railways and air routes which link it to both foreign and domestic destinations. It is the starting point of inter-regional highways reaching Nampo, Wonsan and Kaesong. Pyongyang railway station serves the main railway lines, including the Pyongui Line and the Pyongbu Line. Regular international rail services to Beijing, the Chinese border city of Dandong and Moscow are also available.

A rail journey to Beijing takes about 25 hours and 25 minutes (K27 from Beijing/K28 from Pyongyang, on Mondays, Wednesdays, Thursdays and Saturdays); a journey to Dandong takes about 6 hours (daily); a journey to Moscow takes six days. The city also connects to the Eurasian Land Bridge via the Trans-Siberian Railway. A high-speed rail link to Wonsan is planned.

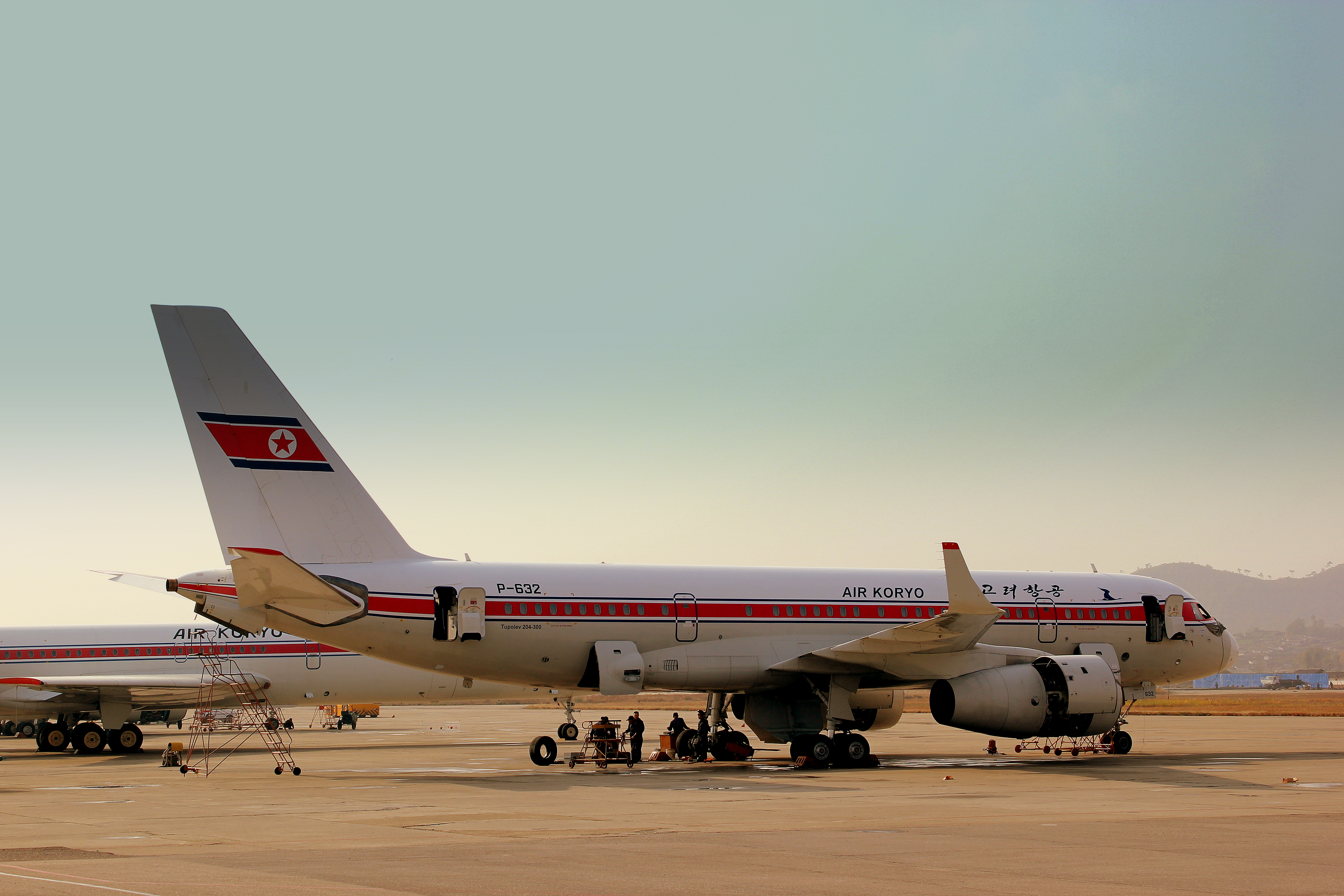
Tupolev Tu-204 of Air Koryo at Sunan International Airport

The Metro, tram and trolleybus systems are used mainly by commuters as a primary means of urban transportation. Cycle lanes were introduced on main thoroughfares in July 2015. There are relatively few cars in the city. Cars are a status symbol in the country due to their scarcity resulting from import restrictions caused by international sanctions and domestic regulations. Some roads are also reported to be in poor condition. However, by 2018, Pyongyang had begun to experience traffic jams.

State-owned Air Koryo has scheduled international flights from Pyongyang Sunan International Airport to Beijing (PEK), Shenyang (SHE) and Vladivostok (VVO). The only domestic destinations are Hamhung, Wonsan, Chongjin, Hyesan and Samjiyon. Since 27 July 2025, Nordwind Airlines has served direct flights between Moscow–Sheremetyevo and Pyongyang once a month.

== Demographics ==
According to the 2008 population census, the city has a population of 3,255,288. It is estimated that 99% of those living in Pyongyang are members, candidate members, or dependents of members of the ruling Workers' Party of Korea (WPK).

== Education and science ==
Kim Il Sung University, North Korea's oldest university, was established in 1946. It has 21 faculties, 4 research institutes, and 10 other university units. These include the primary medical education and health personnel training unit, the medical college; a physics faculty which covers a range of studies including theoretical physics, optical science, geophysics and astrophysics; an atomic energy institute and the largest law firm in the country (Ryongnamsan Law Office). Kim Il Sung University also has its own publishing house, sports club (Ryongnamsan Sports Club), revolutionary museum, nature museum, libraries, gym, indoor swimming pool and apartment units for educators. Its four main buildings were completed in 1965 (Building 1), 1972 (Building 2), and 2017 (Buildings 3 and 4).

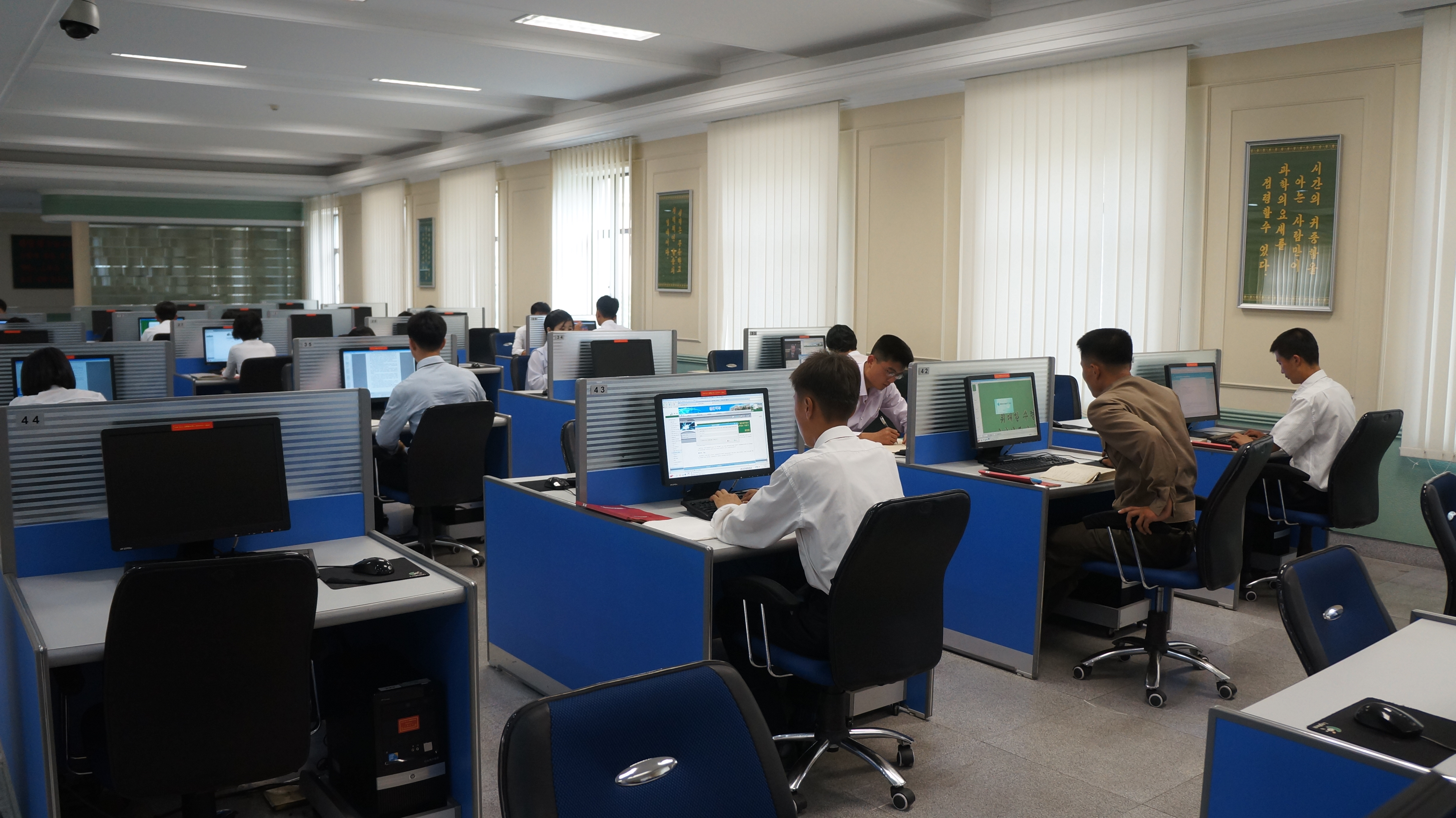
A computer class at Kim Il Sung University in session

Other higher education establishments include Kim Chaek University of Technology, Pyongyang Medical University, Pyongyang University of Music and Dance and Pyongyang University of Foreign Studies. Pyongyang University of Science and Technology (PUST) is the country's first private university; most of its lecturers are American and courses are carried out in English. A science and technology hall is under construction on Ssuk Islet. Its stated purpose is to contribute to the "informatization of educational resources" by centralizing teaching materials, compulsory literature and experimental data for state-level use in a digital format.

Sosong-guyok hosts a 20 MeV cyclotron called MGC-20. The initial project was approved by the International Atomic Energy Agency (IAEA) in 1983 and funded by the IAEA, the United States and the North Korean government. The cyclotron was ordered from the Soviet Union in 1985 and constructed between 1987 and 1990. It is used for student training, production of medical isotopes for nuclear medicine as well as studies in biology, chemistry and physics.

== Healthcare ==
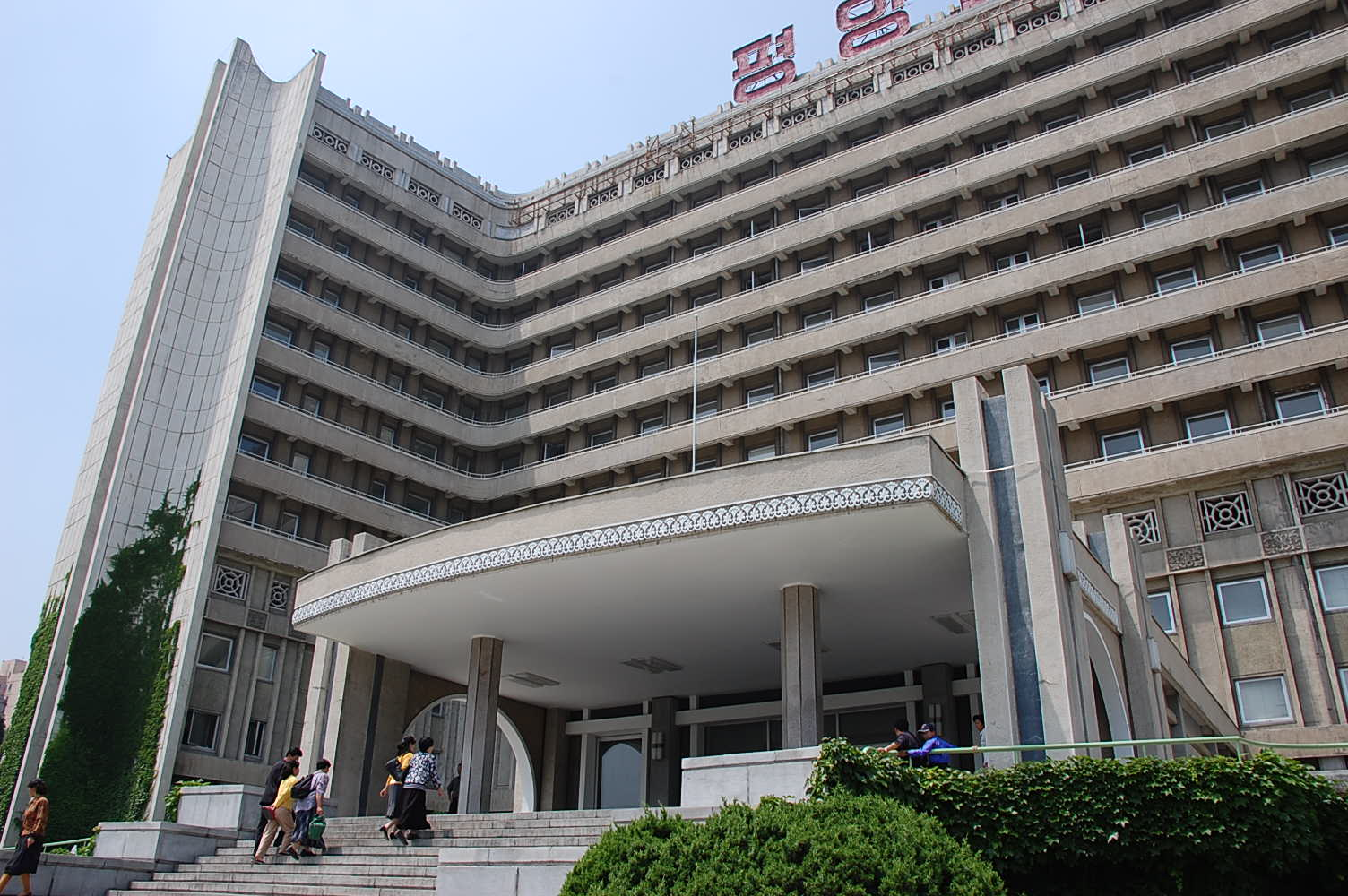
Pyongyang Maternity Hospital

Medical centers include the Red Cross Hospital, the First People's Hospital, which is located near Moran Hill and was the first hospital built in North Korea after the liberation of Korea in 1945, the Second People's Hospital, Ponghwa Recuperative Center (also known as Bonghwa Clinic or Presidential Clinic) located in Sokam-dong, Potonggang-guyok, 1.5 kilometers (0.93 mi) northwest of Kim Il Sung Square, Pyongyang Medical School Hospital, Namsan Treatment Center which is adjacent Pyongyang Maternity Hospital, Taesongsan General Hospital, Kim Man-yoo Hospital, Staff Treatment Center and Okryu Children's Hospital. A new hospital named Pyongyang General Hospital began construction in Pyongyang in 2020.

== Notable people ==
- Elmer Ray Noble (1909–2001), protozoologist and parasitologist, was born in Pyongyang, where his parents were missionaries from the USA.

== Twin towns – sister cities ==
Pyongyang is twinned with:

- Baghdad, Iraq
- Chiang Mai, Thailand
- Dubai, United Arab Emirates
- Jakarta, Indonesia
- Kathmandu, Nepal
- Moscow, Russia
- Tianjin, China
- Ulaanbaatar, Mongolia

== See also ==
- List of cities in North Korea
- List of second-level administrative divisions of North Korea
