= Panghyon-dong =

Panghyŏn-dong
- Dong (Neighbourhood) of Pyongyang
- Dong(Neighbourhood): North Korea
- Direct-administered city: P'yŏngyang-Chikhalsi

Area
  - Total: 14.93 km^{2} (5.76 sq mi)

Korean name
- Hangul: 방현동
- Hanja: 方峴洞
- RR: Banghyeon-dong
- MR: Panghyŏn-dong

Panghyŏn-dong is a neighbourhood that is an exclave of the city of Pyongyang, North Korea, used as a missile base. It is located near the city of Kusong, which it was formerly part of. The neighbourhood became part of Pyongyang in 2018. The area is restricted from foreign entry because of its involvement with the defense industry, and the residents get special treatment in food rations.

== History ==
In 1954, Panghyŏn worker's district was created from Nam chang ri and parts of Chong songri, which was part of then Kusong County (which later became Kusong city). The workers district was named as such for the Simbang mountain known in hanja as Panghyon. As a result of the promotion of Kusong county to Kusong city, it became part of Kusong city in 1967. The area was known as Panghyŏn worker's district until 1974, when it was demoted to Dong(neighbourhood).

== Missiles ==
The neighbourhood was where the DPRK performed its first test launch of the "Hwasong-14" in 2017.
