= Jang Yeong-jin =

North Korean defector

- Born: 1957 or 1958 (age 67–68); North Korea

Korean name
- Hangul: 장영진
- RR: Jang Yeongjin
- MR: Chang Yŏngjin

Jang Yeong-jin (or Jang Young-jin; Korean: 장영진; born 1957/1958) is a writer and the only openly gay North Korean defector.

== Biography ==
Jang was raised in Chongjin, a city on the eastern coast of North Korea. During his childhood, he fell in love with a boy who was his friend named Seon-cheol, a friendship that lasted into adulthood. They would hold hands and share beds. Jang and Seon-cheol would later move to Pyongyang to attend different colleges. They were separated in 1976 when they both joined the North Korean military. According to Jang, "In winter, when soldiers were given only two threadbare blankets each and little heat, it was common for us to find a partner and sleep hugging each other at night to keep warm" and that "We considered it part of what the party called 'revolutionary comradeship.'" Jang also said that in his front line unit, senior soldiers and officers bribed him with apples and other food to lure him into their blankets. In 1982, Jang was discharged from the military after contracting tuberculosis. In Chongjin, Jang worked as a wireless communications official.

In 1987, Jang married a mathematics teacher in an arranged marriage, but was not attracted to her or women in general. After years of remaining childless, the married couple visited a doctor on the advice of relatives to see if they had any physical problems, which they did not. Jang had previously seen a neurologist while he was in university because he was "wondering why I was so different to others" but that "as soon as I started talking about my feelings, I had to run out of the office, because the doctor started yelling at me." Jang would later file for a divorce but was denied one. Fearing losing her job as a teacher, Jang's wife appealed for him to stay married. Jang also re-established ties with Seon-cheol, who had returned from the military, married a nurse and had two children. Both friends occasionally visited each other and their wives let them share a bed together, thinking it was a habit from their childhoods.

In the winter of 1996, Jang fled North Korea by crossing the China–North Korea border across an icy river, but could not get to South Korea from China. He then re-entered into North Korea and after five days of traveling, escaped to South Korea on April 27, 1997 by crawling through the Korean Demilitarized Zone (DMZ), making him one of the few people to successfully do so. Jang's defection made headlines and his family were punished for his actions, being banished to a remote village in the north. After his arrival, officials in South Korea debriefed Jang for five months before releasing him after he spoke of his difficult marriage in North Korea. Jang would not fully understand his sexual orientation until early 1998, when he discovered that he was gay from reading a magazine article about gay rights and gay men coming out. The article showed pictures of a same-sex couple kissing each other and reported that there were gay bars in Seoul.

In 2004, Jang fell in love with a local flight attendant who he was introduced to by the owner of his favourite bar. After three months of dating, Jang gave the flight attendant all of his savings, belongings, and rental house so the flight attendant could buy them a bigger home to live in. Despite promising to be his partner, Jang did not see the flight attendant again and tried reporting him to the police for fifteen straight days until the police told Jang to give up. This incident diminished Jang's trust in other people. Afterwards, Jang fell ill and was hospitalized for a month, which resulted in him losing his factory job and becoming homeless. He later suspected his illness was caused by the stress of being tricked by the flight attendant. Jang had also contacted gay rights activists for help. Around the same time as the incident, Jang learned that three of his brothers and one of his sisters in North Korea had died after being banished from their village after Jang defected. An anonymous North Korean defector who had known Jang's family said that his wife had also been expelled from her village, but was later reinstated.

Jang would later recover from unemployment by getting a job as a cleaner and recovered from homelessness by saving up his money to rent a new home. He then started to spend his free time writing and in late April 2015, he published an autobiography called A Mark of Red Honor, which was later translated to English in 2017. In May 2015, Jang said that he was writing a fictional novel "about women in North Korea, like my mother and sisters." As of June 2015, he was working as a cleaner in a building in downtown Seoul. In a February 2016 interview, Jang said that he had left his job as a cleaner "to fully focus on writing." In 2020, he met Korean American restaurant owner Min-su on a dating website. Four months later, Jang met Min-su in the United States and two months after that, he was proposed to by Min-su. In March 2021, the couple planned to marry later that year.

== See also ==
- LGBT rights in North Korea
