= Gender inequality in Korea =

Gender inequality in Korea can refer to:

- Gender inequality in North Korea
- Gender inequality in South Korea
