= Women's rights in North Korea =

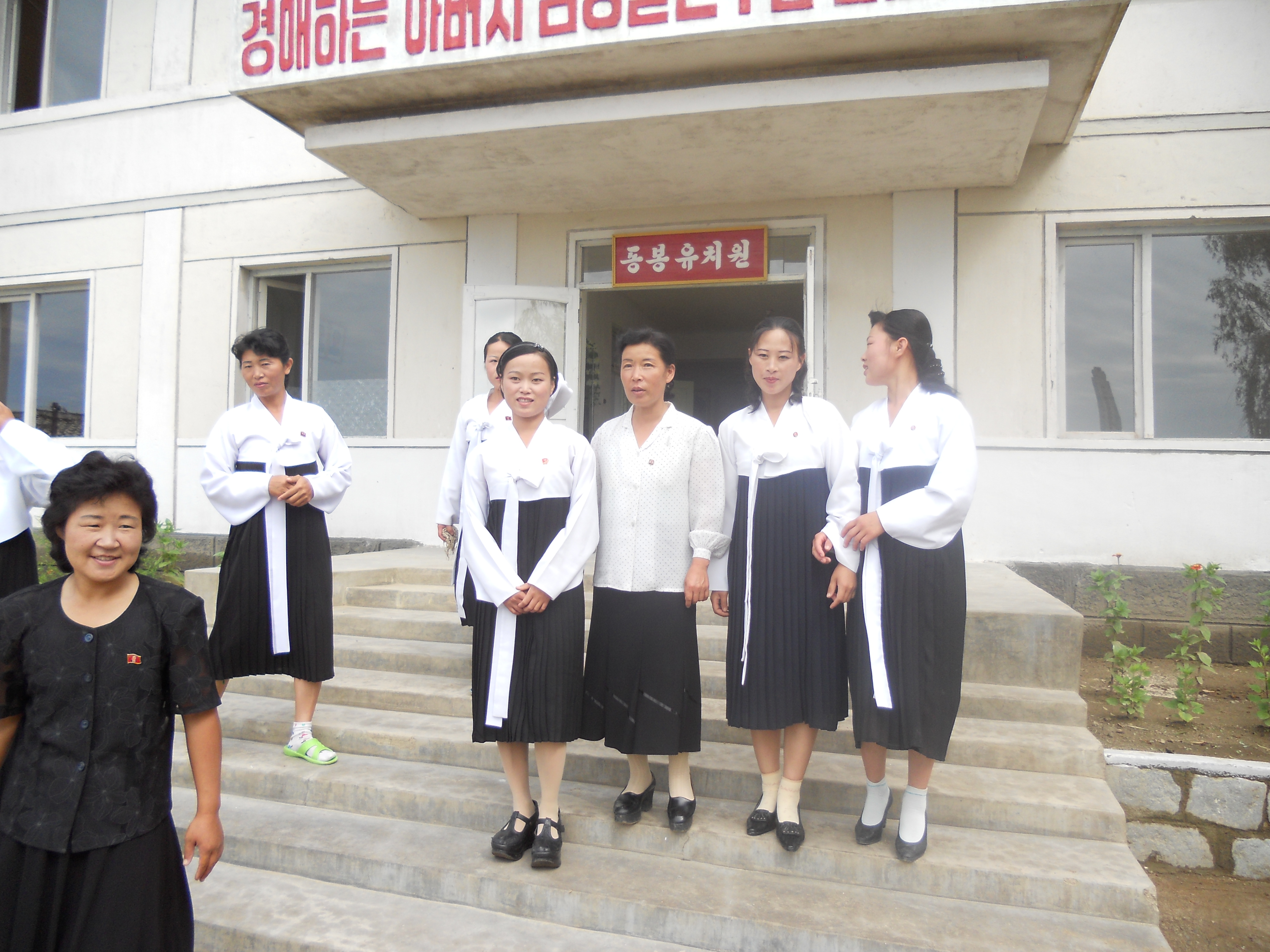
A group of women in North Korea

Women's rights in North Korea have varied throughout history. In recent history, major events of the 20th century, such as the Division of Korea and later the 1990s North Korean famine have played an important role in shaping sex relations.

== Historical context ==
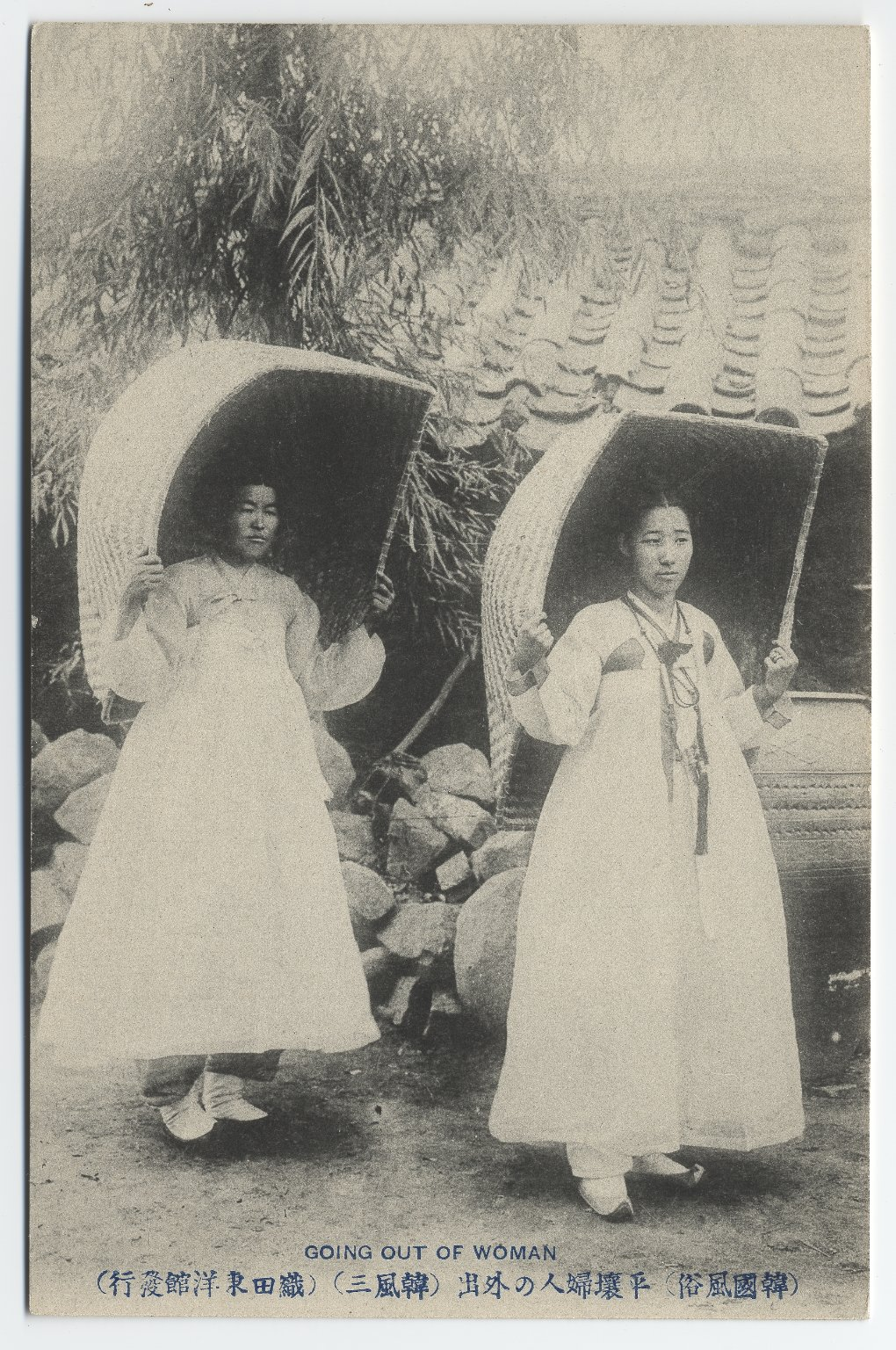

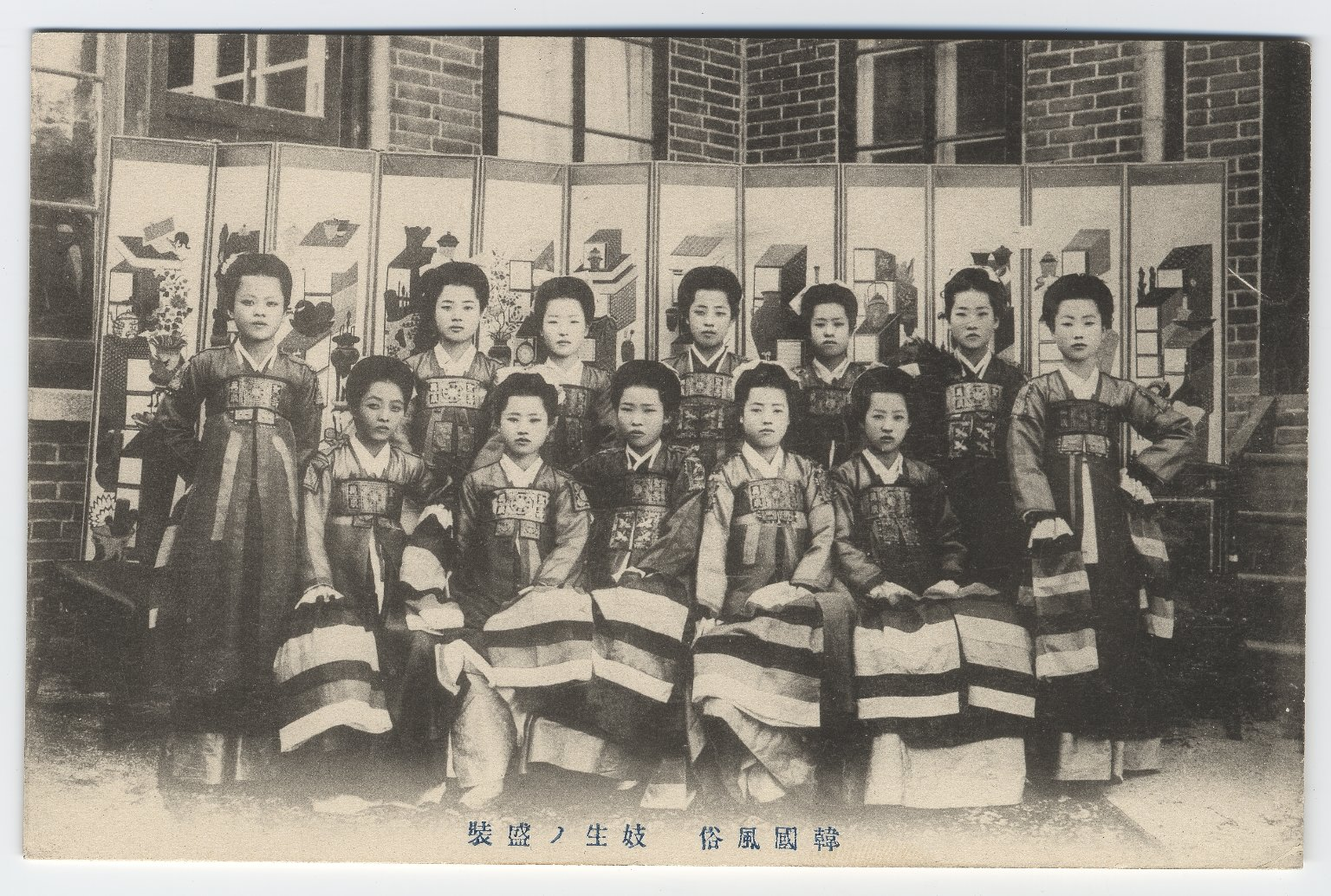

Before 1945, in North Korea, women had very few rights. They were expected to give birth to male heirs and rear them to assure the continuation of the family line. Women had few opportunities to participate in the social, economic, or political life of society. In traditional Korean society, academic education was not considered important for women, and only a few received formal education. In the 19th century, it was Christian missionaries who established girls' schools, thus allowing young Korean females to obtain a modern education. There were a few exceptions to these limitations. For example, female shamans were called on to cure illnesses by driving away evil spirits, to pray for rain during droughts, or to perform divination and fortune-telling.

The social status and roles of women were radically changed after 1945. On July 30, 1946, authorities north of the thirty-eighth parallel passed a Sex Equality Law. The 1972 constitution asserted that "women hold equal social status and rights with men." The 1990 constitution stipulates that the state creates various conditions for the advancement of women in society. In principle, North Korean law supports sexual equality.

Many challenges remained however. Although the new regime brought women more equal participation in the labor force outside the home and more access to education, women continued to be considered inferior to men. An example is the strong son preference, and the burden put on women to do most housework, and the different sex roles confirmed by the practice of separating boys and girls at both the elementary and higher middle-school levels. Some aspects of school curricula for boys and girls also are different, with greater emphasis on physical education for boys and on home economics for girls. However, in the four-year university system, women majoring in medicine, biology, and foreign languages and literature seem especially numerous.

North Korea remains a highly patriarchal society, and the women's role in the family sphere and in the public sphere has changed several times from the end of World War II to this day. After the war, women were enrolled in the socialist economy in large numbers, and played a major role in the rebuilding of the country. But as the economy improved in later decades, women were less needed in the workforce, and a move towards more traditional roles emerged.

State employees were given rations and most families could survive on that. But during the North Korean famine of the 1990s, these rations, known as the Public Distribution System, dried up and families had to look elsewhere for financial support. Men, even though they are not receiving payment, are still required to attend their government jobs. The cash-strapped government relies heavily on the free labor it gets from men and it is unlikely to discontinue this practice anytime soon.

For men to be free from work, they must pay their employer between 20 and 30 times their monthly salary, allowing them to take on other, more profitable jobs, such as repair work. This payment is required even if they are unable to afford food to eat, otherwise they are punished with jail time. The current involvement of women in the labor market is uncertain, because of the unregulated grey economy informal market economic system which has proliferated since the famine. According to Human Rights Watch, women traders in the informal sector are vulnerable to sexual violence and exploitation, and "implementation of rules and regulations over market operations are arbitrary and government officials can demand bribes and sexually harass and coerce women with impunity."

== Abuse against women ==
Even within the lowest rungs of the songbun system, the ascribed caste system of North Korea, women face unique hostilities. It is common for those living in poverty to turn to prostitution and drug use, and even those who manage to escape the country through China risk being sexually abused or trafficked.

=== Sexual violence in criminal law ===
The North Korean Criminal Code punishes rape of a woman with "reform through labour" of up to five years, or five to ten years in serious cases; under a 2007 addendum to the code, "extremely grave" cases of rape may be punished by life imprisonment or death. By contrast, coercing a woman "in a subordinate position" into sexual intercourse is punishable only by short-term labour of up to one year, rising to a maximum of three years of reform through labour if the offence is committed against several women, if the victim "becomes depraved", or if she dies by suicide as a result. Human Rights Watch and legal scholars have criticized these provisions as vague and inconsistent, noting that the code does not define "rape", does not make consent a central element, and treats sexual coercion by superiors far more leniently than rape, despite defector testimony that sexual violence by men in positions of authority is common and rarely prosecuted. According to figures the government submitted to United Nations bodies, convictions for coercing a subordinate numbered five in 2008, six in 2011, and three in 2015. The Korea Institute for National Unification reported in 2023 that the 2022 revision of the Criminal Code had reduced the penalties for rape to a maximum of four years of labour correction, or four to nine years for serial offences.

== Prostitution in North Korea ==
The great famine of the 1990s changed the North Korean society deeply. During and after the famine, millions of North Koreans grasped at any survival strategy necessary to feed themselves. Those who did not change, and whom the state did not feed, died. For thousands of North Korean women, prostitution was the survival strategy of last way to feed themselves, and often, their children.

In Kim Il Sung's North Korea, the sex trade was invisible to the outside world. That began to change when Chinese traffickers forced thousands of female famine refugees into the sex trade. By the end of the great famine, prostitution had become stealthily ubiquitous inside North Korea. It also became more organized and more predatory, with state officials playing a growing role in its patronage and protection.

In Hamhung in 2008, a number of high-ranking party officials were accused of patronizing a tea house that also sold sex, and for protecting it against police interference. In Hyesan in 2009, the manager of a state-run inn frequently patronized by central party officials was arrested for pimping women and girls, some in their mid-teens. North Korea's 2009 currency "reform" drove more women into the sex trade. By 2010, prostitution in Chongjin had been organized by “couple managers” who matched customers, often soldiers, with sex workers, often female university students, and sometimes women who had become dependent on drugs. In 2014, the manager of a North Korean factory in China was accused of pimping out female factory workers.

The reports do not suggest that the state has consciously chosen to tolerate or profit from the sex trade as a matter of policy. The security forces periodically crack down on the sex trade, but inevitably, when corrupt authorities attempt to police a profitable trade, the authorities begin to see that trade as just another way to supplement their pay. More fundamentally, in a society where officials are the law, where enforcement is arbitrary, and where the state profits from trade at least indirectly, it can be hard to tell the difference between corruption and state policy. Today, the Daily NK reports that prostitution is increasingly run by well-connected businessmen and protected by the officials they're connected with.

A North Korean defector informed Ha Tae-kyung, a lawmaker of the Saenuri Party and publisher specializing in North Korea, that were approximately 500 prostitutes in their city, which has a population of 400,000. “If [we] depend on the simple arithmetic calculation and put North Korean population as 20 million, we can assume that there should be about 25,000 prostitutes in North Korea,” Ha told Sieff.

== See also ==
- Gender inequality in North Korea
- Women in North Korea
- LGBTQ rights in North Korea
