= Marriage in Korea =

Marriage in Korea mirrors many of the practices and expectations of marriages in other societies. Modern practices are a combination of millennia-old traditions and global influences.

== Marriage in pre-modern Korea ==
The practice of matrilocality in Korea started in the Goguryeo period, continued through the Goryeo period and ended in the early Joseon period. The Korean saying that when a man gets married, he is "entering jangga" (the house of his father-in-law), stems from the Goguryeo period.

=== Marriage during the Goryeo period (918–1392) ===
Marriages during the Goryeo period were made primarily on the basis of political and economic considerations, at least among the aristocracy.

King Taejo, the founder of the Goryeo dynasty, had 29 queens with which he built alliances with other aristocratic families. However, he married all but two of his daughters to their half brothers, rather than using them to further build and affirm alliances. A strategy continued by his successors. The practice of marrying royal daughters to half brothers ended under the insistence of the Mongol Empire, and the Mongol and Korean royal families exchanged princesses. The kings of Goryeo married the imperial princesses of the Yuan dynasty (Mongol Empire), beginning with the marriage of King Chungnyeol to a daughter of Kublai Khan. Cousin marriage was common in the early Goryeo period, and non-royal aristocrats married daughters to half brothers of different mothers also. However, such consanguineous marriages were gradually prohibited by banning such individuals' children from attaining positions in the state bureaucracy and later came to labeled as adulterous but often persisted despite these sanctions.

In contrast with the prevailing custom of patrilocal residence for married couples during the Joseon period and modern era, Koreans of the Goryeo period it was not uncommon for a husband to matrilocally reside with his wife and her parents after marriage. Wedding ceremonies were held at the home of the bride's family and the average age of marriage was late teens with aristocrats marrying earlier than commoners. Weddings included gift exchange and a banquet, which were meant to display the bride's family's wealth. There was no exchange of bride wealth or dowry. Marriages were often arranged by matchmakers. Goryeo society was highly stratified and kinship and status were determined bilaterally, including the status and relatives of both mothers and fathers. Thus, unlike during the Joseon period, brides and husbands remained members of both their natal kin group and their affinal family after marriage. Marriage ideally did not lead to the division of the household into smaller units and families preferred to retain their daughters after marriage, with or without their husbands. The prospect of an inheritance from in-laws may have been a significant motivation for husbands to take up residence with their wives' kin. Inheritance was not determined by primogeniture and both sons and daughters received equal shares of inheritance from their parents.

Although plural marriages were practiced, wives and their offspring were not ranked and each had equal claim as heirs. Marriages could easily be broken by husbands or wives. A woman who remarried too frequently could gain a negative reputation as promiscuous, but Koreans of the Goryeo dynasty were not seen as prudish, at least by Chinese standards of the time. There were no prohibitions against widows remarrying apart from having to observe a period of mourning. The offspring of a widower were retained by their mother and her family.

=== Marriage during the Joseon period (1392–1910) ===
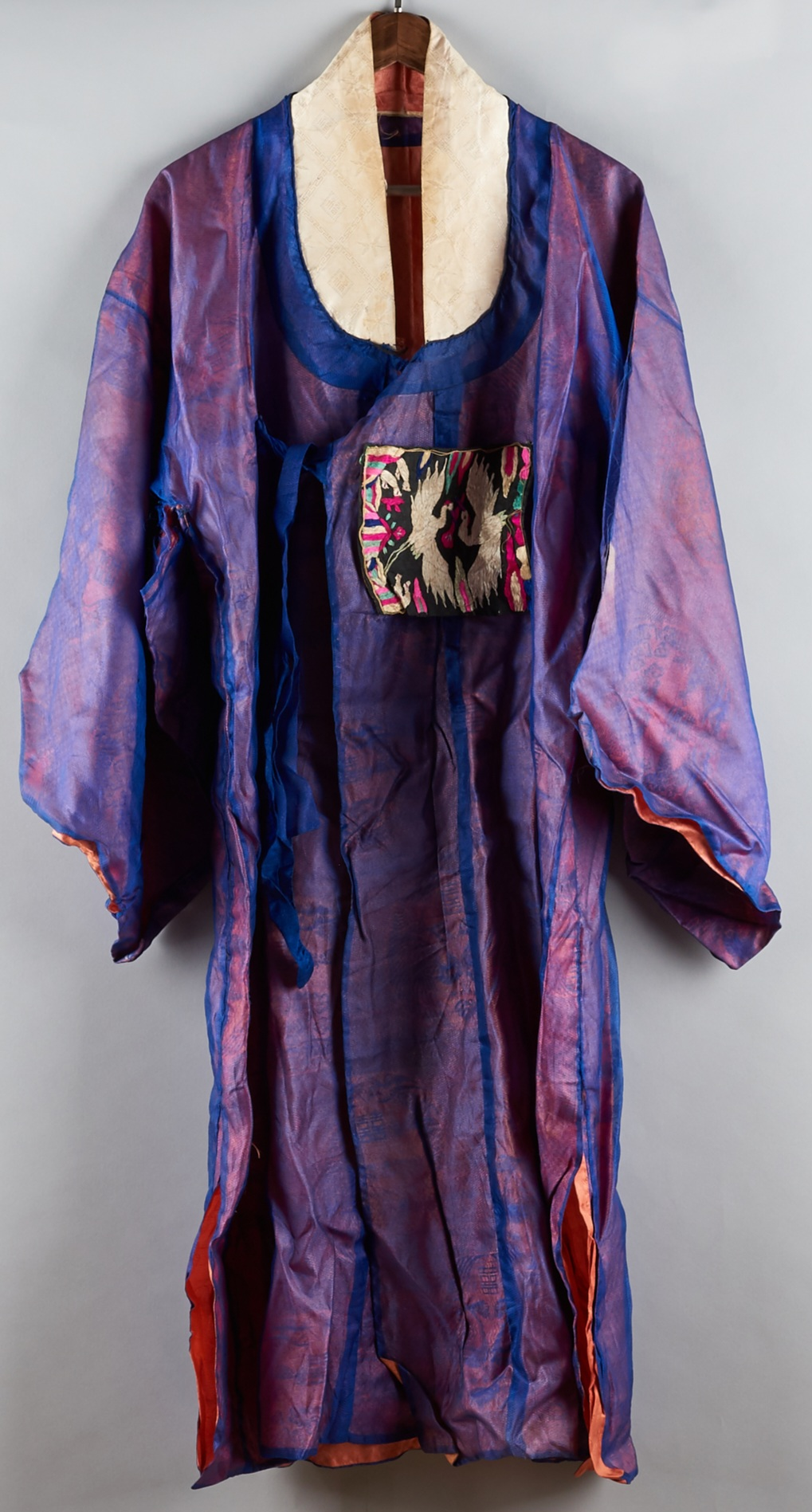
Korean traditional wedding dress for men

Distinctions were introduced at the beginning of the Joseon dynasty, in imitation of feudal imperial China, which distinguished primary and secondary wives, thereby clarifying the line of succession. Essential criteria for a primary wife was that she entered her husband's family as a virgin, and that she could not be descended from low-class ancestry in the case of marriages to noblemen, who, at the introduction of this rule, were forced to choose which of their already multiple wives to designate as primary. In imitation of the Ming criminal code, primary wives could not be divorced for another, and wives' rankings could not be re-ordered. The purpose of the reform ranking wives was to increase the clarity of distinctions of social status across society. From then on elites generally chose their first wives from fellow yangban families, while choosing secondary wives from the lower classes, increasing the distinction between the yangban aristocracy and commoners.

During this period patrilocal residence after marriage became the norm through royally dictated changes to laws governing mourning obligations and inheritance rights. This shift was accomplished in part through increasingly strict restrictions on consanguineous marriages, first outlawing marriage to matrilineal first cousins, then extending to second cousins and ultimately expanding to prohibit marriage between individuals of the same surname by 1669. In 1427 another Chinese law was adopted that fixed the marriageable age of first marriage at 15 years of age for men and 14 years for women, although if a parent was chronically ill or elderly (over 50) the marriage age limit could be lowered to 12. The rationale for preventing early marriage was the belief that children married too young would not be sufficiently socialized to understand the duties of spouses and also thus incapable of properly socializing their own children. However, this law was frequently violated. Aristocratic yangban men tended to marry younger than commoners. Concern among legislators over the perceived lack of marriageable women led to the passage of laws that made families subject to punishment for failing to marry her off at an appropriate time.

== Marriage during Japanese colonial rule ==
Recent scholarship has traced how Western‑style Protestant church weddings moved from a missionary rite to a fashionable urban norm in the 1910s‑30s, during Japanese rule. Drawing on Tonga ilbo wedding columns, Presbyterian and Methodist mission archives, as well as studio photographs, historian Hajin Jun documents the first widely reported chapel ceremony: Deacon Pak’s 1917 wedding in rural Hwach’ŏn. Jun also explores the subsequent “new‑style (sinsik) wedding” boom among Seoul professionals. Costs ballooned (a rented frock‑coat alone could equal a week’s factory wages; buying one could cost a full year’s pay), prompting cultural nationalists to denounce so-called “Amen‑style” weddings as wasteful, sectarian, and performative. Reformers such as the Enlightenment Fraternity (1922) and Ko Yŏng‑hwan (1931) therefore proposed inexpensive, secular alternatives, the society‑style civic wedding and the minimalist Korean national wedding, in hopes of creating rites that were modern yet free of denominational markers. Jun situates these debates squarely within Japanese colonial rule: the looser press censorship of the 1920s let Korean newspapers air disputes between Protestant Christians and non-Christians about how to conduct weddings and other ceremonies in unprecedented detail. On the political side, the 1915 Regulations on Religious Propagation and, later, the 1934 Guidelines on Ritual Practice gave the Japanese Government‑General a legal framework to monitor and ultimately standardise rites and ceremonies (including weddings) for all colonial subjects. In effect, cultural change around wedding ceremonies became a venue where Korean intellectuals negotiated modernity under an occupying power that both permitted and policed religious difference.

== Marriage in North Korea ==
Following the establishment of communist regime in North Korea in the late 1940s, the regulations on family matters between North and South started to diverge, as the North Korean government quickly introduced a set of new laws and regulations affecting family law. One of the impetus for new laws was a revolutionary rhetoric endorsing gender equality; however, gender equality in North Korea remains a major issue, with most independent observers concluding that North Korea is still far from achieving parity between genders.

Engagement is not legally recognized. Marriage is allowed at age 18 (for boys) and 17 (for girls). Unlike in South Korea, there are no legal provisions regulating or banning marriage between persons in cases of consanguinity or other types of familial relations. Divorce is allowed, subject to administrative approval.

As of the late 2010s, marriage rates in North Korea have been reported as very high (over 96% of adults aged 30+ are married), and divorce rates as very low (less than 1% of North Korean population is classified as separated or divorced according to official data).

Arranged marriage is still popular in North Korea.

== Marriage in South Korea ==
=== Eligibility and prohibitions ===
Marriage in South Korea is currently restricted to unions between individuals of the opposite sex as same-sex marriages remain unrecognized. People over 18 years old may marry with their parents' or guardians' consent. Otherwise South Korea's age of consent to marriage is 20 in Korean age (19 in international age). The age of consent for sexual activity is 16. South Korea also recognizes what it calls "De Facto Marriages" equivalent to "Common Law Marriages" of couples who have not legally registered their marriage but who have either made it publicly known that their relationship is akin to a marriage, had a public wedding ceremony, or have been cohabiting as though they are married.

==== Marriage within the same ancestral clan ====
Prior to 2005 marriage between two individuals of the same clan violated Korean incest taboos and was illegal while marriage between individuals of the same surname was socially prohibited. As of the mid 1990s, 55% of South Korea's population shared one of five surnames: Kim, Park, Lee, Choi and Jung; and 40% of South Koreans claim membership in one of three major clans: the Gimhae Kim clan, Jeonju Yi clan, and the Miryang Park clan. This codified prohibition was inspired by similar taboos in Tang China during Korea's late Joseon dynasty, which strove to realize Confucian ideals of governance and social order.

=== Traditional wedding ceremonies ===
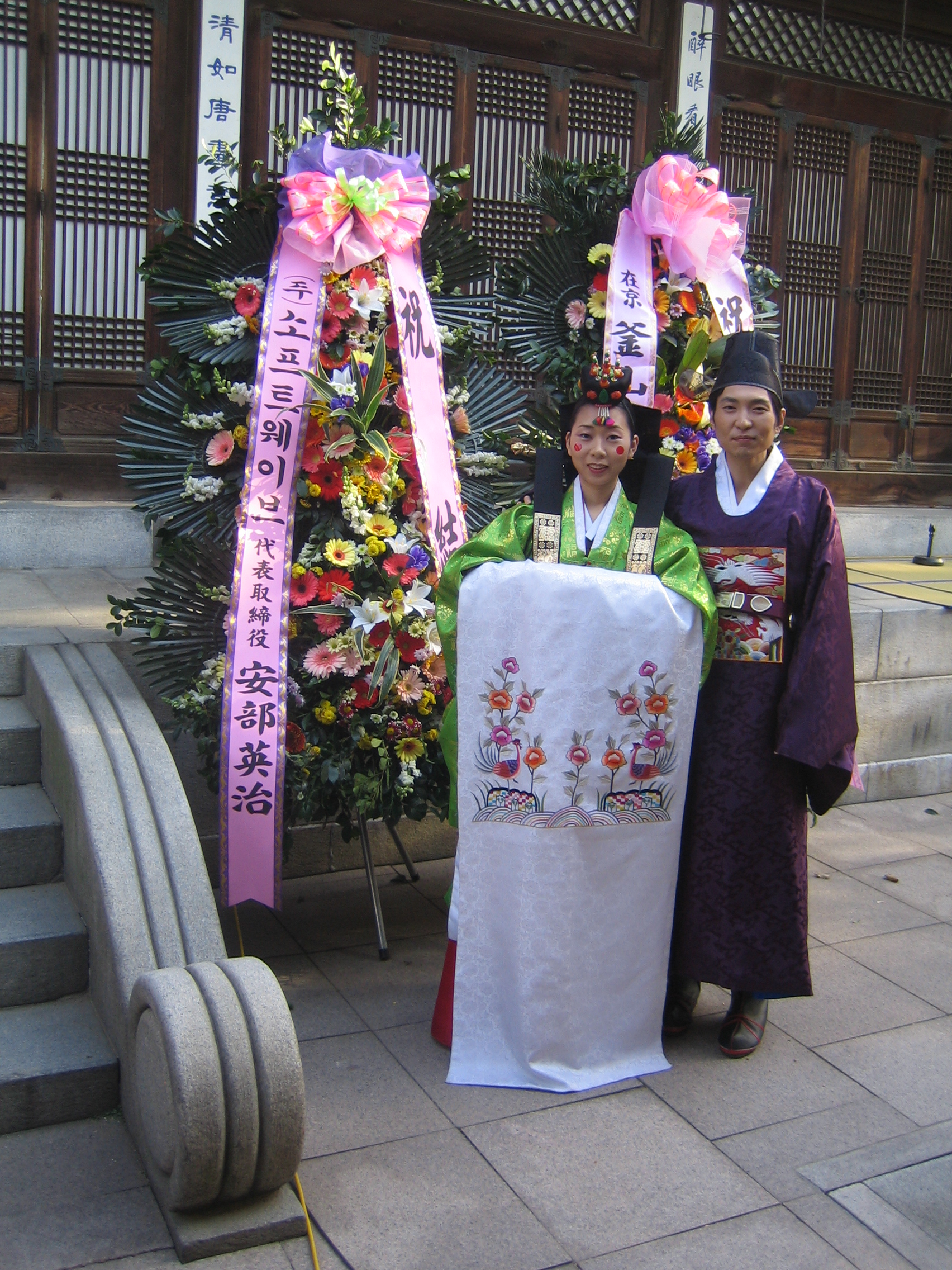
Korean wedding hollye.

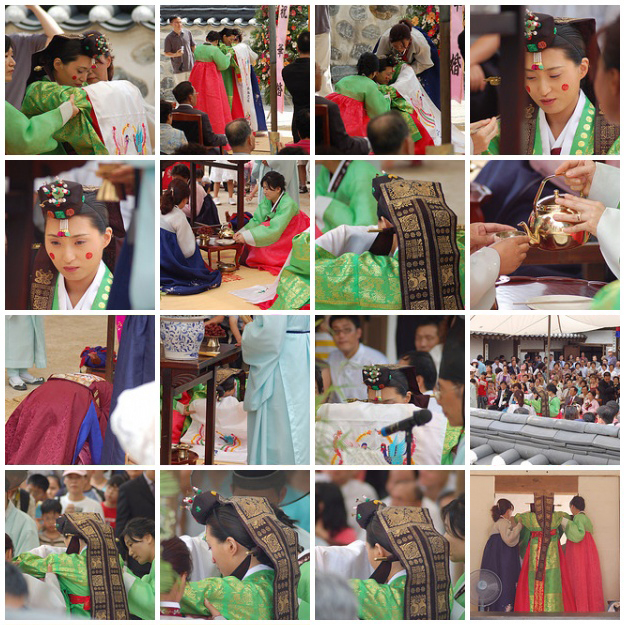
Korean traditional wedding ceremony.

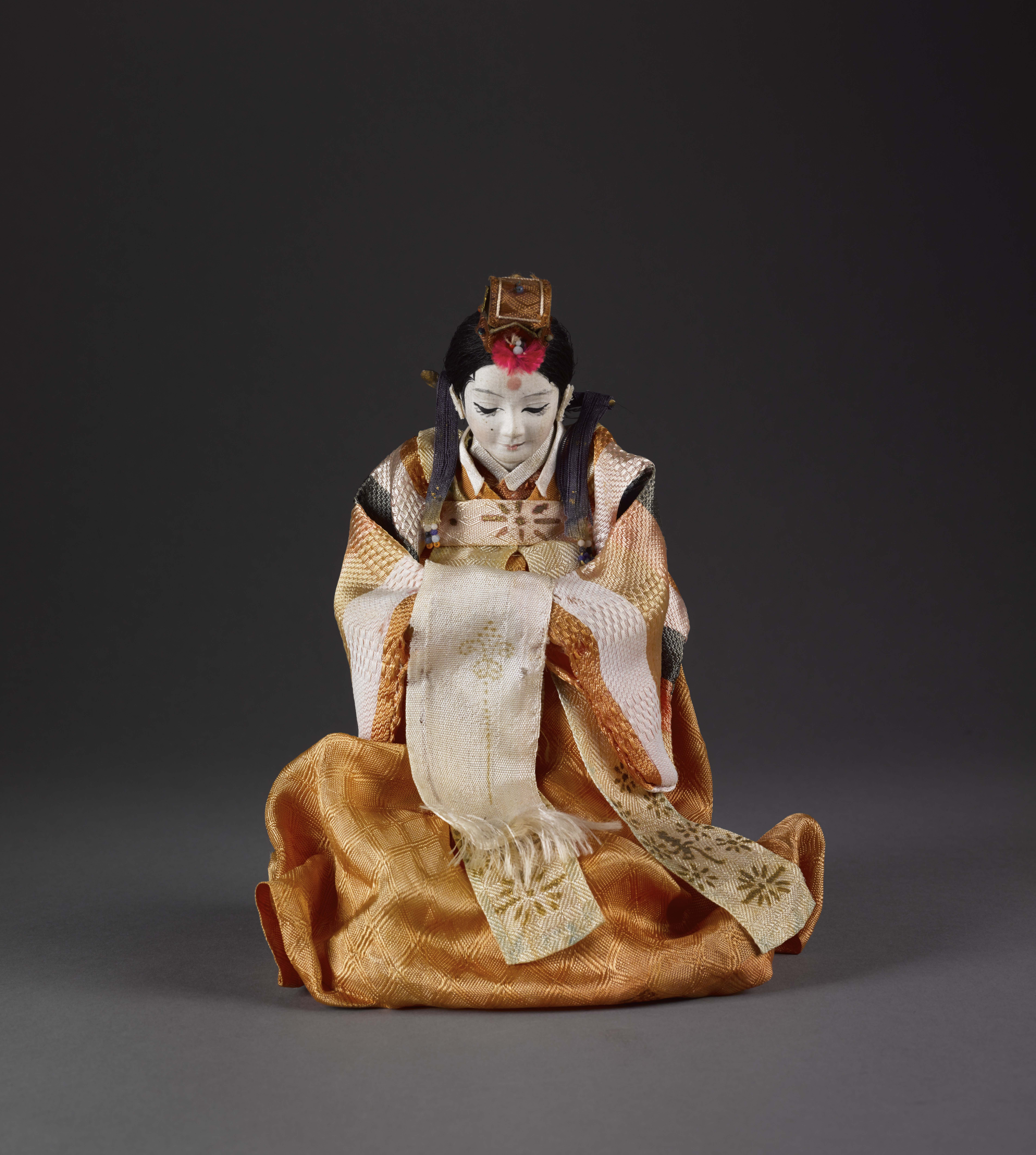
Korean bridal doll, c. 1800–1894, from the Oxford College Archives of Emory University

==== Pre-ceremony ====
Traditional Korean weddings are based around and centered on traditional Confucian values. Every aspect of the wedding, from the arrangement of the marriage to the ceremony and post celebrations, had important and elaborate steps to go along with them. In traditional Korean culture, like many traditional cultures, marriage between a man and a woman were decided by the bride and groom's elders. As in Confucian values family and the customs of a family is placed above all. Marriage is considered the most important passage in one's life. This is not only the union between two individuals but two families. Additionally, a marriage was a way, particularly among elite families, of developing and/or maintaining a social status. For these reasons, a significant amount of time was spent in preparation before finally performing the actual wedding ritual.

The first step is called the euihon (의혼; 議婚), or 'matchmaking', when both the bride and groom's families discuss the possibility of marriage. Various factors are taken into consideration such as social status, personality, appearance, academic and/or agricultural (industrial) achievements, as well as material harmony as predicted by a fortuneteller. "In general the euihon is determined when the bridegroom-side sends a proposal letter of marriage and the bride-side sends a reply letter which permits this marriage." Once the response from the bride is sent back to the groom, if agreed, the groom then sets up a date for the ceremony. This second step is called naljja seoljeong (날짜설정; 날짜設定), or 'date setting'. The groom's year, month, day, and hour (according to the lunar calendar), which is known as saju (사주; 四柱), is written on a paper and wrapped in bamboo branches and tied with red and blue thread. Lastly, the package is wrapped with a red and blue cloth and sent to the bride's family. The birthdate of the groom is sent to a fortuneteller which sets the date based on the saju. That date is then sent back to the groom.

The last step in pre-ceremonial traditions is called the napchae (납채; 納采), or 'exchanging valuables'. Once the date is set, the groom then sends a box to the bride which is known as ham (함; 函). In the ham, there are typically three items: the honseo (혼서; 婚書), the chaedan (채단; 彩緞), and the honsu (혼수; 婚需). Of the three, the most important is the honseo, or marriage papers. This is given to the bride in dedication to wed only one husband. The wife is expected to keep this paper forever; upon death the papers are buried with the wife as well. The chaedan is a set of red and blue cloths which are used to make clothes. The red and blue is a representation of the Yin/Yang philosophy. Lastly, the honsu is a variety of other gifts given to the brides family. This can include household goods, jewelry and clothes.

==== Ceremony ====
In ancient times, weddings (혼례; 婚禮; honrye) were held in the bride's yard or house. The groom traveled by horse to the bride's house and after the wedding ceremony took his wife in a palanquin (sedan chair) to his parents' house to live. The bride and groom wore formal court costumes for the wedding ceremony. Ordinary people were permitted to wear the luxurious clothes only on their wedding day. Hand lanterns are used for lighting the way from the groom's home to the bride's home on the night before the wedding. Traditionally, the groom's family would carry a wedding chest filled with gifts for the bride's family. Wedding geese are a symbol for a long and happy marriage. Cranes are a symbol of long life and may be represented on the woman's sash. Pairs of wooden Mandarin duck carvings called wedding ducks are often used in traditional wedding ceremonies because they represent peace, fidelity, and plentiful offspring.

==== Attire for bride and groom ====
The women's attire includes a jeogori (저고리; short jacket with long sleeves) with two long ribbons which are tied to form the otgoreum (옷고름). A chima (치마), a full-length, high-waisted, wrap-around skirt, is worn. Boat-shaped shoes made of silk are worn with white cotton socks. The bride's attire might include a white sash with significant symbols or flowers. A headpiece or crown may also be worn. The norigae (노리개) is a hanbok (한복) decoration which has been worn by all classes of Korean women for centuries. It is tied to the skirt or the ribbon on the jacket. The knot on the top is called the maedeup (매듭). A jacket (jeogori, 저고리) and trousers and an overcoat are worn. The jacket has loose sleeves, the trousers are roomy and tied with straps at the ankles. A vest may be worn over the shirt. A black hat could be worn. The wedding costume for men is also known as gwanbok for the groom.

=== Modern style wedding ceremonies ===
In larger cities, luxury hotels will have 'wedding halls' or ballrooms used specifically for wedding ceremonies. These rooms are decorated with a wedding motif and are rented to couples. Other wedding halls are independent facilities that can accommodate several different weddings at once. Today, many couples will initially have a more 'Westernized' ceremony with tuxedo attire and white wedding gown, then proceed with a smaller-scale, traditional Korean wedding after the main ceremony.

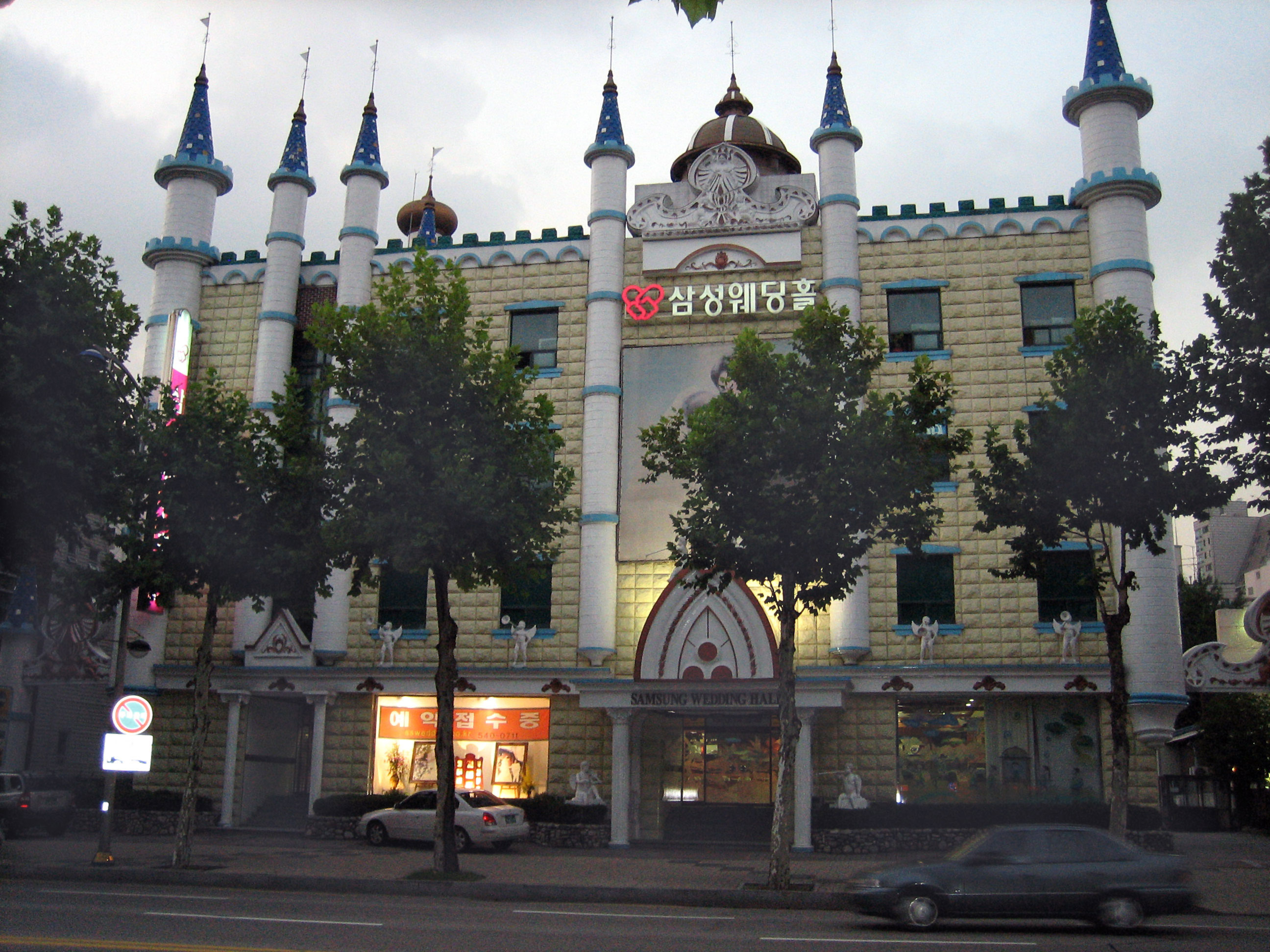
Samsung Wedding Hall in Seoul.

A modern-style wedding in South Korea.

==== Wedding halls ====
Whereas a hotel ballroom or church must retain the flexibility necessary for other functions, independent wedding halls are able to focus strictly on weddings, and even cater to specific themes. Weddings in luxurious hotels had been prohibited by the government in 1980, became partly permitted in 1994, and became completely permitted in 1999.

In busier wedding halls, formality (except for the couple and their families) is typically relaxed compared to Western standards. There may be a buffet hall on one floor in which guests from all of the different weddings come for a meal, either before or after the ceremony, which may take no longer than 20 minutes. The most common gift for a new couple is cash, and in the hall outside the wedding salon, representatives from the couple's families will collect and log donations.

The official ceremony in front of the guests is followed by Pyebaek, which is a ceremony among family members exclusively. The bride formally greets her new parents-in-law after the wedding ceremony. Additionally, the groom often gives a piggy back ride to his mother and then his bride, symbolizing his acceptance of his obligations to both his mother and wife.

==== Wedding feast and reception ====
The modern Korean wedding feast or reception, (kyeolhon piroyeon, 결혼피로연; 結婚披露宴) can be a mix of traditional and Western cultures. At a traditional wedding feast a guest would expect to find bulgogi (불고기, marinated barbecue beef strips), galbi (갈비, marinated short ribs), a variety of kimchi (pickled cabbage with a variety of spices, with other ingredients such as radishes, seafood). There will be many accompanying bowls of sauces for dipping.

The meal is always accompanied with a vast quantity of white, sticky rice (밥) as well as gimbap (김밥), which is rice, egg, spinach, crab meat, pickled radish, and other ingredients rolled in seaweed and sliced into 1-inch rounds. Mandu (만두), dumplings filled with cabbage, carrot, meat, spinach, garlic, onion, chive, and clear noodle. These dumplings may be deep-fried or steamed. Soup will be offered, very frequently a kimchi type, or a rice cake soup (rice dumplings with chicken broth), or doenjang jigae, a fermented soybean paste soup.

Also popular are a light broth boiled from dried anchovies and vegetable soups rendered from dried spinach, sliced radish or dried seaweed. Steamed rice cakes (tteok) sometimes embellished with aromatic mugwort leaves or dusted with toasted soy, barley, or millet flour are presented as a ritual food. A large variety of fruits, such as Korean pears, and pastries will be offered for dessert. A spoon and chopsticks are used for eating.

=== Current practice ===
As of 2020, according to Statistics Korea, the average age of first marriage is 33.2 for men and 30.8 for women. In a large number of marriages, the male is older than the female. This age disparity is usually intentional. In 2013, the average cost of a wedding per person surpassed 50 million won.

==== Marriages between Koreans and non-Koreans ====
2025 Transnational marriage in South Korea
Korean women + Foreign husbands		Korean men + Foreign wives	
Country	Cases	Country	Cases
United States	1,438	Vietnam	4,762
China	843	China	2,510
Vietnam	754	Thailand	1,951
Canada	322	Japan	1,483
Japan	190	United States	638
Australia	165	Philippines	527
Cambodia	135	Laos	462
UK	133	Cambodia	371
Germany	102	Russia	339
France	89	Canada	191
Taiwan	74	Mongolia	183
New Zealand	59	Uzbekistan	174
Uzbekistan	50	Morocco	114
Philippines	47	Turkiye	106
Pakistan	44	France	87
Italy	37	Australia	80
India	27	Kazakhstan	77
Turkiye	22	UK	75
Nepal	14		
Sri Lanka	11		
Others	535	Others	1214
Total	5,091	Total	15,610

In 2024, there were 15,624 international marriages for Korean men and 5,135 international marriages for Korean women. Korean men married Chinese women in 2,604, Japanese women in 1,176, American women in 628 and Russian women in 318. Korean women married American men in 1,479 which includes mostly Korean-American men also known as gyopos, Chinese men in 905, Canadian men in 303 which includes Korean-Canadian men, and Japanese men in 147 cases.

In 2010, 10% of married couples in South Korea were interracial, an increase from 4% in the year 2000.

Since there is lack of population of women in rural areas of South Korea, some men rely on marriage brokers and agencies to set up a marriage with a mail-order bride, mostly from southeast Asian countries like Vietnam and Thailand, as well as Uzbekistan and Nepal. Marriages between South Korean men and foreign women are often arranged by marriage brokers or international religious groups. Men pay money to match-up and meet their spouse on the moment of their arrival to South Korea. There is mounting evidence to suggest that there is a statistically higher level of poverty and divorce in the Korean men married to foreign women cohort. Currently divorces between Koreans and foreign spouses make up 10% of the total Korean divorce rate.

As language and cultural differences become an issue many foreign brides do suffer from cultural differences which also affects the social integration of their children. The children of inter-racial marriage families called "Damunhwa" meaning multicultural family, face identity crisis and racial abuse as they try to assimilate into Korean society. Since negative social perception of foreign marriage agencies and brides from these agencies exist as well as extreme conformity of one-race Koreans, these children suffer from lack of sense of belongingness and feel abused from isolation.

As a means of reducing future problems, the government is setting up programs for men who are thinking of marrying a foreign woman through a collaboration between the Ministry of Gender Equality and the Ministry of Justice. Also, the Ministry of Health, Welfare and Family Affairs is offering programs to help foreign wives to try to adjust to Korean society through Healthy Family Support Centers nationwide.

Multicultural Family Support Centers in South Korea are operated and funded by the Ministry of Gender Equality and Family. The aim and purpose of these centers are to provide family education, counseling and cultural services for multicultural families, to support the early settlement of immigrant women in Korean society, and to help multicultural families enjoy stable family lives. By collaborating with local cities and provinces, the Support Centers manage to provide basic but necessary services to local women such as Korean language and cultural education services, translation and interpretation services, childcare support services, child education support services, employment & venture support services.

==== Foreign spouses ====
Foreign husbands and wives married to South Korean citizens as of 2019. This figure excludes those who have naturalized and obtained South Korean citizenship; 135,056 foreign-born spouses have naturalized until 2019.

Rank	Nationality	Total	Husbands	Wives
1	China	60,324	13,539	46,785
2	Vietnam	44,172	2,742	41,430
3	Japan	14,184	1,235	12,949
4	Philippines	12,030	463	11,567
5	Thailand	5,130	99	5,031
6	Cambodia	4,641	369	4,272
7	United States	3,883	2,801	1,802
8	Uzbekistan	2,688	141	2,547
9	Mongolia	2,497	163	2,334
10	Russia	1,668	119	1,549
11	Taiwan	1,394	116	1,278
12	Canada	1,334	1,098	236
13	Nepal	884	176	708
-	Others	11,196	5,870	5,326
-	Total	166,025	28,931	137,094

==== Same-sex marriage ====
Despite the illegality of same-sex marriage in Korea, some gay couples are having non-legal private ceremonies. In 2023, a South Korean high court in Seoul ruled that the national health insurance agency of South Korea could not discriminate against same-sex couples.

Movie director and producer Kim-Jho Gwang-soo had a private non-legal ceremony with Kim Seung-hwan, the head of the gay film distributor Rainbow Factory in September 2013. Kim Jho held a public, non-legal wedding ceremony with film distributor David Kim Seung-hwan (his same-sex partner since 2004), in Seoul on September 7, 2013. The ceremony was the first of its kind in the country, since the law does not recognize same-sex marriages. In Seoul on November 10, 2019, Kim Gyu-Jin, an open lesbian, married her partner in public. She wrote a book about her lesbian marriage experience in Korea, called ''Unni, will you marry me?"(ko: 언니, 나랑 결혼할래요?) On May 7, 2020, she and her partner filed a marriage registration with the Jongno District Office, but they received a notice of non-repair.

=== Types of marriage and courtship ===
==== Love marriage ====
"Love" marriage, as it is often called in South Korea, has become common in the past few decades. The expression refers to the marriage of two people who meet and fall in love without going through matchmakers or family-arranged meetings. Typically, the bride and groom first meet on a blind date arranged by friends, on a group date, at their workplace, or while in college or university. South Korean families accept this type of marriage more readily than they used to.

==== Divorce ====
Historically, the divorce rate in South Korea was comparatively low before it began rapidly increasing in the mid-1990s. The divorce rate peaked at 3.5 divorces per 1,000 people within the population, which is noted to be a higher rate than several European countries. The divorce rate in South Korea began to decline in the 2010s, with a rate of 2.1-2.3 per 1,000. The South Korean population has generally shown conservative attitudes towards divorce, but has increasingly shown open attitudes alongside the rising divorce rate. There is limited data available to determine the likelihood of remarriage after divorce in Korea.

Studies have shown that marriages between a Korean national and foreign spouse are much more likely to divorce. Approximately 19% of marriages between a Korean husband and a foreign wife were dissolved within 48 months, while approximately 13% of marriages between a Korean wife and foreign spouse dissolved within 48 months. In comparison, only 6% of marriages between Korean nationals ended within 48 months.

It has been noted that an increasing percentage of the Korean population ends marriages at a later age. The average age of males and females who have filed for divorce rose to 50.1 and 46.8 in 2021. Within the last decade, the average age for males divorcing rose 4.7 years and the average age for females rose 5.2 years. The rate of divorce for other age groups declined in 2021, while those over sixty saw an increase, which is known as a “gray divorce”. Couples that have separated after living 30 or more years together increased 7.5 percent in 2021, which is more than double compared to the previous decade”.

Korean law may dictate which spouse may file for divorce. The Supreme Court of Korea may not grant a divorce if the petitioner is found responsible for the breakdown of a marriage. If one spouse has committed an act of unchastity, the other spouse may file for divorce. There are exceptions that include any serious cause that may make it difficult to continue a marriage. The Supreme Court of Korea does not completely rule out divorce that is petitioned by the spouse that was found to be at fault. Several other factors may be taken into consideration, such as the amount of time that has passed since separation and the feelings of the other spouse. A couple that mutually consents may be granted a divorce without court proceedings. Korean attorneys expect that Korea will move to a no-fault divorce system in the future. In 2015, the Constitutional Court decided that a law that made adultery a crime was unconstitutional.

== See also ==
- Multicultural family in South Korea
