= LGBTQ rights in North Korea =

- North Korea
- Legal status: Never criminalized officially; reported incidents of criminalization
- Penalty: No official penalty; executions for homosexuality reported
- Military: Celibacy required during initial 10 years of service (for all personnel)
- Discrimination protections: None

Family rights
- Recognition of relationships: No recognition of same-sex relationships
- Adoption: No

Lesbian, gay, bisexual, transgender and queer (LGBTQ) people in North Korea may face social challenges due to their sexuality or gender identity. Homosexuality is not illegal in statute, but instances of criminalization and execution for homosexuality have been reported. Other LGBTQ rights in the country are not explicitly addressed in North Korean law.

== Legality of same-sex sexual activity ==
Homosexuality and transgender issues are not formally addressed in the country's law. According to the United States Department of State, no provisions exist in North Korean law to prohibit discrimination on sexual orientation or identity; the concepts do not appear. As of 2026, there is no North Korean law that recognizes same-sex marriage, civil unions or domestic partnerships. Additionally, Article 8 of the Family Law of the Democratic People's Republic of Korea states that "Marriage may be done only between one man and one woman".

The 1950 criminal code (amended 2009) does not explicitly criminalize same-sex sexual activity. However, articles 193 and 262 of the amended criminal code outlaw the creation, distribution and possession of "decadent" culture and sexually explicit media as well as engaging in "obscene" activities.

In 2011, The Korea Times, a South Korean publication, reported that North Korea had executed a lesbian couple, a North Korean woman and Japanese woman, for being influenced by capitalism and "bringing corruption of public morals". In the article, the source was Free North Korea Radio, itself a project of the Defense Forum Foundation, a U.S. government sponsored nonprofit organization.

As of 2013, the Korean Friendship Association (an international group sponsored by the government of North Korea) said "the DPRK recognizes that many individuals are born with homosexuality as a genetic trait and treats them with due respect...Homosexuals in the DPRK have never been subject to repression, as in many capitalist regimes around the world." The same document said North Korea "rejects many characteristics of the popular gay culture in the West, which many perceive to embrace consumerism, classism and promiscuity."

According to the United States Department of State, the state news agency, the Korean Central News Agency (KCNA), claimed in 2014 that same-sex sexual activity was not present in the country.

The Constitution of North Korea, last revised in 2024, does not explicitly address discrimination on the basis of sexual orientation or gender identity.

In 2023, the South Korean Ministry of Unification published a 584-page report "North Korean Human Rights Report". According to the report, defector testimony alleged that at least one male detainee in a detention camp was secretly executed for homosexuality in 2014.

== Military service ==
The North Korean military law mandates celibacy during the first ten years of service for all enlistees, without regard to their sexual orientation or gender of any sexual partners. Reportedly, male soldiers regularly break this rule by engaging in casual heterosexual and homosexual affairs. These homosexual relationships have been described as situational sexual behavior rather than a sexual orientation. A defector has said that intimacy is particularly prevalent in cold, mountainous areas, during the ten years of mandatory service where it is impossible to have intimate interactions with women. Author Bradley Martin writes that such behavior, while not illegal, may result in execution.

== Adoption and family planning ==
According to the United States State Department in its 2020 report on North Korea, same-sex couples could not legally adopt children in North Korea.

== Politics and propaganda ==
In 2008 and 2011, North Korea opposed both the "joint statements on ending acts of violence and related human rights violations based on sexual orientation and gender identity" at the United Nations that condemn violence and discrimination against LGBTQ people. Its precise reasons for doing so remain unclear.

In his analysis of North Korean domestic propaganda, The Cleanest Race, B. R. Myers, characterized the official attitude towards homosexuality as that of it being a typical "Western" decadence. Myers used an extract from a 2000 short story, "Snowstorm in Pyongyang" (Korean: 평양의 눈보라, romanized: Pyongyang ui nunbora), to illustrate how, in his view, North Korean perceptions contrast the decadent foreign against upright local behavior. The story was published in the North Korean literary magazine Joseon Munhak, and depicts captured crewmen of the USS Pueblo imploring their North Korean captors to allow them to engage in gay sex.

"Captain, sir, homosexuality is how I fulfill myself as a person. Since it does no harm to your esteemed government or esteemed nation, it is unfair for me and Jonathan to be prevented from doing something that is part of our private life."

[The North Korean soldier responds], "This is the territory of our republic, where people enjoy lives befitting human beings. On this soil none of that sort of activity will be tolerated."

— "Snowstorm in Pyongyang", 2000

In 2014, after the United Nations Human Rights Council published a report on human rights in North Korea advising a referral to the International Criminal Court, the Korean Central News Agency, the North Korean state-owned news agency and arm of Propaganda and Agitation Department, responded with an article that included homophobic insults against the report's author Michael Kirby, who is openly gay. The KCNA's article went on to attack Kirby and gay marriage:

... he is a disgusting old lecher with a 40-odd-year-long career of homosexuality. He is now over seventy, but he is still anxious to get married to his homosexual partner.

This practice can never be found in the DPRK boasting of the sound mentality and good morals, and homosexuality has become a target of public criticism even in Western countries, too. In fact, it is ridiculous for such gay [sic] to sponsor dealing with others' human rights issue.

— Korean Central News Agency (2014)

B. R. Myers, author of The Cleanest Race and an expert on North Korean propaganda, described North Korea's homophobic attack on Kirby as a long established pattern of anti-gay hate speech:

Homosexuality is often portrayed as a form of imperialist humiliation.

— B. R. Myers (2014)

== Culture ==
Defectors have testified that most North Koreans are unaware of the concept of sexual orientation. Most defectors only realized that the ideas of homosexuality, bisexuality, and transgender identity exist upon arrival in South Korea. Jang Yeong-jin is the only known openly gay North Korean defector. Jang faced discrimination while in South Korea, which is itself a country that is generally conservative on LGBTQ rights. He has said that, while same-sex affection does occur in North Korean society, not being attracted to the opposite sex is likened to an illness.

Cross-dressing openly is also reported to exist, and is considered unusual but not illegal.

== Summary table ==
Same-sex sexual activity legal	Yes (Never criminalized)
Equal age of consent	Yes
Anti-discrimination laws in employment only	No
Anti-discrimination laws in the provision of goods and services	No
Anti-discrimination laws in all other areas (incl. indirect discrimination, hate speech)	No
Same-sex marriages	No
Recognition of same-sex couples	No
Step-child adoption by same-sex couples	No
Joint adoption by same-sex couples	No
Gays and lesbians allowed to serve openly in the military	Celibacy required during the first 10 years of military service regardless of sexual orientation.
Right to change legal gender	
Access to IVF for lesbians	No
Commercial surrogacy for gay male couples	No
MSMs allowed to donate blood	

== See also ==
- Human rights in North Korea
- LGBTQ rights in Asia
- LGBTQ rights in South Korea
- Women's rights in North Korea
- Jang Yeong-jin
