= Multicultural families in South Korea =

A growing number of families in South Korea have members that were not raised in South Korean culture. This includes both families with non-Korean members and families with Korean diaspora or North Korean defector members.

Policy changes are being made to accommodate their life in South Korea.

== Definition ==
Policies designed to support multicultural families in South Korea are aimed at families with people who have acquired South Korean nationality. It can be defined as a family type where two cultures coexist in one family through international marriage, but also includes the families of foreign workers, North Korean refugee families, and ethnic Korean families moving to Korea.

The first category, international marriage families, refers to a family consisting of a married Korean citizen and a foreign spouse. The second category, the families of foreign workers, includes those that foreign workers bring with them to Korea or new families formed by foreign workers in Korea. Most of those families include children. The third category, North Korean refugee families, is composed of residents from North Korea with the official registration. These people have left North Korean society with various motives. In some cases, refugees escape North Korea with their family members, but policies are also designed for those who start a new family in South Korea. The final category includes ethnic-Korean families who were born and raised in China or Russia with a unique Korean culture, and settled in South Korea for the purpose of immigration, employment while their ancestors left Korea with various background.

Children of multicultural families are defined as children born between spouses of Koreans and foreign residents with different cultural background. At first, children of multicultural families were called Kosian or mixed-blood. Later, people started to use value-neutral term 'international marriage children' or 'children of international marriage immigrants'. More recently, people began to use the term 'children of multicultural families'.

The Multicultural Families Support Act defines a multicultural family as a couple where one spouse immigrated through marriage and the other is a Korean citizen, or couples where both spouses became Korean citizens through marriage. This definition excludes international families legally residing in South Korea where both spouses are foreigners. This leads to discrimination, such as limited access to government financial support for childcare or other benefits.

=== Classification of children ===
==== Children of international marriage immigrants ====
First, there are children of international marriage immigrants. These are children with one of their parents having Korean nationality and another parent having foreign nationality. Second, there are children of foreign worker's families. Immigrant worker bring their children over Korea or birth their children in Korea. Most of them have their own country's nationality, live in Korea as foreign. They cannot receive support based on Multicultural families supporting policy. It is a service for multicultural family to adapt to Korea and to support economical self-reliance. But the number of them has been increased and some of them acquired Korea nationality. Third, children of North Korean refugee family called 'saeteomin' as a defector. They acquire Korea nationality through naturalization. They have cultural problem because South Korea and North Korea have been formed different culture after the division of Korea into north and south.

==== Immigrant Youth ====
Immigrant Youth is an adolescents who come to Korea after growing in their own country because of their parent's remarriage with Korean or a children of International marriage families who come to Korea after growing in one of their parents country in adolescence. In other words, Immigrant youth is school age teenagers who have foreign nationality, and children who settle down to Korea in the middle of growing in their mother country. They are different with children of multicultural family who have Korean nationality, and who learn and use Korean language since birth in aspects of nationality. In perspective of law of multicultural family, immigrant youth is just ‘foreigner’, so that immigrant youth cannot be subject to the law about multicultural family.

===== Biracial children in Korea =====
To be a biracial child in Korea means life begins as a minority. Traditionally South Korea is regarded as a country with a single ethnicity so mixing races is not something that traditionally has been supported. However, there has been an increasing number of children of mixed race due to the number of marriages between women from other countries and Korean men. Research using data from stories of 56 youth between the ages of 9 and 17, has shown that children born of mixed race are not seen as ‘pure’ and not accepted as Koreans but they are classed an ‘in-between Korean and foreigner. Similarly, the study identified that interracial children had experienced clear forms of bullying, name calling, questioning of one’s national origins, exclusion, and discrimination. It is clear that the pre-existing notion of a hierarchy based on origin and color is strongly influenced by the notion of nationalism and how pure-blood Korean individuals are.

Skin color seems to play a large part in the discussion and there is a ‘color-coding hierarchy’ that has a lot to do with how Koreans view race and color. Koreans who have whiter skin are given a higher value than those with yellow skin and those with dark brown and black skin tones are placed lower in value. This is directly linked to the Korean War where some African-American soldiers abandoned babies born to Korean women who were prostitutes or came from poor backgrounds. The children ended up being called names such as ‘darky’ or ‘blacky’ and have a hard time being accepted. There is also an, ‘origin-coding hierarchy’ and the origin and economic position of the parent becomes a factor. Korean society discriminates against those mixed-race people who are from developing countries. Regardless of whether or not the children or the parents have lived in Korea all their lives and speak fluent Korean, their monoracial peers do not allow them to be fully integrated as ‘Korean.’

In Korea, one drop of ‘different’ blood does not assign them to a particular race, as it does in America, it assigns them instead as ‘foreigners’ – and this is always understood to mean not fully Korean. As a result, children find themselves having to choose between cultures while still never being accepted as fully Korean.

Pittsburgh Steelers receiver Hines Ward wrote an article titled "The Long Way Home" where he described what it felt like to have a Korean mother and an African-American father. He describes feeling like an outcast in both black and Asian-American communities even though not living in Korea. Mixed-race children in Korea say that classmates and even some teachers bully and harass them. Ward’s mother reveals that this was the reason she could not return to Korea with her son.

Pearl S. Buck International is one organization that works on behalf of mixed-race children in Korea. In a survey, it revealed that mixed-race Korean children withdrew from elementary school at 9.4 % while Korean children had a zero % rate.

There has been recently a push by the provincial government to better educate residents about multi-ethnic families. Local authorities are attempting to integrate foreign residents through free Korean language schools. Because of Korea’s monoethnic population, this new phenomenon of multiculturalism is a very important issue facing the society.

== Present situation ==
The number of children of multicultural family is 207,693 in 2015. The number of children who under 6 years old are 110,000, and it takes 60%. The number of school age teenagers who must be educated at elementary, middle, high schools is increased about 7,000~10,000 every year, as well as infancy. The number of children of multicultural family who are born in Korea is 83%. But the number of immigrant children, that parents come to work on business and get Korean nationality and bring their children later, tended to increase as well as multicultural family that be formed with marriage.

=== Legal aspects ===
The multicultural family supporting law was established in 2008. It established the general planning of multicultural families. In 2016, measures were taken to adjust the life cycle of children from multicultural families.

== Social, economic and cultural aspects ==
=== Social aspect ===
Present situation: In 2015 the number of student of multicultural family in elementary, middle, high schools is 83,000. Students of multicultural family are about 1.4% of the total students. In students of multicultural family, elementary school students are about 73%, middle school students are about 16.8%, high school students are 10.2% of the total in 2015.

About the percentage of school attendance of student of multicultural family, elementary school attendance percentage is 97.2%, middle school is 75.6%, high school is 76.7%. It shows a low standard in compared with total percentage of school attendance. About the total percentage of school attendance, elementary school is 97.2%, middle school is 96.2%, and high school is 93.6%.

Supporting policy: Multicultural education welfare policy of the central government in Korea is divided in two parts: multicultural education policy that locates inside of public education system, multicultural education policy that locates outside of public education system. Multicultural education policy that locates inside of public education system becomes effective in aspects of 16 municipal ministry of education and each schools, leading under the Ministry of Education. In outside of public education system, 8 central department and local government is involved in education welfare with Ministry of Gender Equality and Family as a center. Ministry of Gender Equality and Family provides services tailored to different life stages for multicultural family and manages multicultural family support center.

=== Economic aspect ===
Present situation: The percentage of employment of children of multicultural family over 15 years old is 27.1% in 2015. It means only 10,329 children find a job among total 38,052 children. The percentage of employment of children who both parents are foreigner is 39.6%. And it is higher than children who are grown by Korean mother and foreign father (25.3%), children who are grown by foreign mother and Korean father (24.7%). Statistical data about employment status of children of multicultural family shows that regular employee is 21%, temporary employee is 42.2%, day-to-day worker is 35.4%, independent businessman who takes employee is 0%, independent businessman who do not takes employee is 0.8%, unpaid family employee is 0.6% of the total. This shows that children of multicultural family have kind of job like temporary employee and day-to-day worker rather than job like permanent employee, stable job. According to statistical data, about the rate of day-to-day worker, children who both parents are foreigner is 16.1%, children who are grown by Korean mother and foreign father is 36.6%, and children who are grown by foreign mother and Korean father is 39.7%. It means that children who are grown by foreign parents can find more stable job and find job easily than other case.

Supporting policy: Rainbow teenager center, one of support center for children of multicultural family, manages program for training children of multicultural family about job ‘Take tomorrow, Take my job(내-일을 잡(job)아라)’. ‘Take tomorrow, Take my job’ means that prepare future through find own job. It is a program that helps children of multicultural family (Immigrant youth, multicultural teenager, children of North Korean refugee family) to go into the world more stably through support job training and finding a job. Cost for education and training is free. Targets for support are 16~24 years’ old Immigrant youth, multicultural teenager, children of North Korean refugee family who want to have professional certificate.

=== Cultural aspect ===
Children of multicultural families often experience uncertainty over their identity due to differences in language, culture, and values. Different behaviors in thought and even communication difficulties with parents also contribute to this. Students who look Korean also tend to shame their parent’s nationality.

Supporting policy: In Korea, each local government manages their own support programs to establish identity of children of multicultural family. Multicultural family support center of Cheongju-si provides various services for children of multicultural family. Through ‘bilingual environment project’, one of support services, center tries to recover identity of children of multicultural family. Multicultural family support center of Hamyang-gun manages ‘versatile program’ targeting children of multicultural family. ‘Understanding my emotion’ lecture in ‘versatile program’ is a program that can help strengthen positive ego and identity of children through experience of sharing emotion with 15 teenagers in other age groups. An official says that "Truly, due to children of multicultural family undergo various confusion about identity in school and other situations, formation of sympathy and sharing own emotion can help forming healthy identity.
