= Women in North Korea =

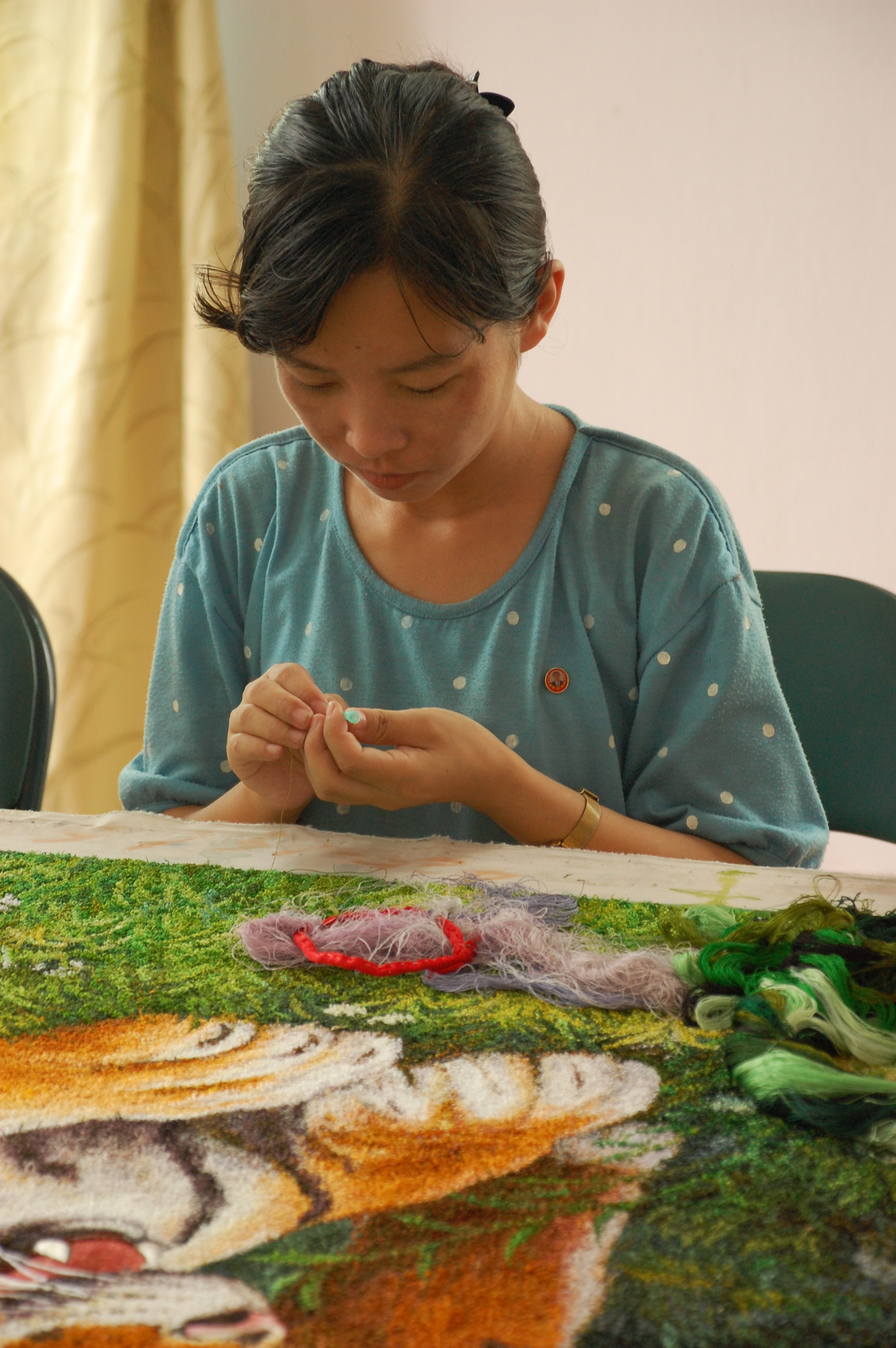
- A woman from North Korea learning embroidery

General statistics
- Maternal mortality (per 100,000): 82
- Women in parliament: 16.3%
- Women in labour force: 47.813%

Gender Inequality Index
- Value: N/A

The status of women in North Korea is not fully understood outside the country, due to the political isolation of North Korea, the unwillingness of the North Korean authorities to allow foreign investigators access in the country, and the existence of conflicting reports. The official position of the North Korean government is that women have equal rights with men.

North Korea has enacted laws such as the Law on Sex Equality, the Labor Law, and the Law on Nationalization of Essential Industries. Although these social systems have not entirely been successful, they have been integrated into daily life to help women. The reforms implemented provided women's rights at work, rights of inheriting and sharing of properties, and rights of free marriage and divorce. North Korea also outlawed polygamy. The state confiscated all privately owned land, in theory eliminating property discrimination. Today, women in North Korea participate in a variety of labor forces, and there is a considerable number of women who are in high positions. Also, there are many facilities for women including sanatoria, rest homes, and maternity hospitals.

The ratio of women to men in high wage jobs is considerably lower than that of low wage jobs. In addition, most women in high positions in society are either relatives or wives of top leaders. Jon Halliday has argued that the political atmosphere is an example of the same patriarchal structure that feminist reforms intended to dissolve. This demonstrates the degree to which Neo-Confucian ideals still permeate and affect social and political policies. North Korea has not followed China, Laos, Cambodia and Vietnam in their campaigns against Confucianism.

== Before the division of Korea ==
In the Joseon Dynasty, women were expected to give birth to and rear male heirs to assure the continuation of the family line. Women had few opportunities to participate in the social, economic, or political life of society. There were a few exceptions to limitations imposed on women's roles. For example, female shamans were called on to cure illnesses by driving away evil spirits, to pray for rain during droughts, or to perform divination and fortune-telling.

Before the Yi Dynasty and Neo-Confucianism was introduced, women comparatively had more rights and freedom. Women during the Shilla period held higher positions and statuses (although not equal to those of men) in society and had many legal rights including the right to be considered the head of a household. Furthermore, during the Koryo period, remarriage of women as well as equal property inheritance between men and women was completely acceptable.

However, as Korea entered the Yi Dynasty, Confucian ideology was strongly adhered to by society and immensely affected the roles of men and women. From the young age of seven, males and females were separated and restricted to designated areas of the house: the outer part (sarangcha) for the males and the inner part (ancha) for the women. By Korean Confucian standards, "a virtuous woman obeyed men throughout her life: in youth, she obeyed her father; when married, she obeyed her husband; if her husband died, she was subject to her son."

Few women received any formal education in traditional Korean society. After the opening of Korea to foreign contact in the late 19th century, however, Christian missionaries established girls' schools, thus allowing young Korean females of any class to obtain a modern education. With the influence of Silhak, Tonghak, and Western thought, a priority interest focused on human rights and equality. Thereby in 1886, Ewha Haktang (Ewha School) was established as the first modern women's school. And in response to the Chanyang-hoe (Chanyang Association) and their emphasis on education for women, in 1908, the government established the first public girls' school called Hansong Girls' High School.

During the Japanese colonial period, 1910–1945, Korean women experienced some social changes much like women did in the Western world. Urbanization and modernization in the early 20th century opened up opportunities for women in the workforce. Women moved from rural regions to cities to make new lives for themselves, often finding jobs at factories where they had regular salaries (a new phenomenon for women from rural farms), which were often sent home to supplement their families' income. These city girls had a newfound sense of independence and self-determination in employment and city life. However, the poor working conditions and long hours of early 20th century factories often limited their success and happiness.

Other more fortunate women received education at secondary schools in urban areas. Some even had the chance to study abroad at more prestigious institutions in Japan. These women composed a new sector of the social elite and were participants in consumer culture. These women, dubbed "Modern girls," took advantage of the new opportunities afforded to women in the 1920s and 1930s. They transcended limitations of the agricultural class by marrying urban professionals, participated in the burgeoning modern art and culture scene, and abandoned traditional Korean hanbok for Western attire. While the majority of Korean women still lived traditional lives, it was these "modern girls" that helped to transform the cultural landscape into a more contemporary and internationalist scene.

Although many of these opportunities were not available to women in the countryside, the 1920s and 1930s did bring positive changes to rural areas. Women were trained and educated on a more limited scale, and there were movements to eradicate illiteracy. These movements towards education across the socio-economic spectrum would later influence and encourage North Korean communist activities. It aided in the spread of communist ideals and made it easier to educate and rally the people around communism. Women were also more involved in the public sphere – a continuation of the changes made during the colonial period.

== After the division ==
=== During the North Korean Revolution, 1945–1950 ===
The social status and roles of women were radically changed after 1945. Before the Korean War of 1950–1953, the communist regime in North Korea began reordering traditional Korean society to reflect the ideal communist society. The communist regime in North Korea granted women positions of importance and agency in their communities in its efforts to promote equality. One such example was the inminban, units of about 20–30 families that were often led by women. These women took care of building maintenance and finances and generally kept an eye on the lives of her constituents. According to the government, “an inminban head should know how many chopsticks and how many spoons are in every household.” The women also reported any suspicious activity to the police and conducted random checks. These inminban leaders directly contributed to the communist cause and culture of surveillance, serving in roles of leadership alongside their male counterparts.

The regime also released a publication specifically for women, the Joseon Yeoseong, in order to further educate women on communist ideals. The publication included household tips, health advice, educational materials, and political propaganda.

Women had other opportunities to be involved in nascent North Korean political culture. The regime encouraged people to join various groups – women's organizations were powerful and ambitious. One such organization was the Korean Women's Socialist League, which made demands to the North Korean government for paid maternity leave and the abolition of wage discrimination. They were also responsible for other social changes that included education, prenatal services, and women's lectures. Through organizations like this, women had some degree of agency under the North Korean regime.

Women were not necessarily completely free, and their rights were limited. The regime held a tight grip the on women's daily lives during the revolution. For example, the state gave women a model schedule to follow, which required women to cook and clean and only allowed for an hour and a half of personal time at the end of the day. They were also expected to masterfully balance duties at home with duties for their organizations, a task that proved too exhausting and nearly impossible.

Many women contributed to the economy during the North Korean Revolution as well. Women took on the roles of journalists, teachers, clerks, and more. These women were forward thinking in their reasons for being in the workforce, some expressing a desire to be trailblazers for future businesswomen. They still saw economic involvement as an uphill battle, though, because of the regime's emphasis on women's duties in the home. So, although women had political and economic agency in some ways, they were also tied to the home, and this disparity ultimately only reinforced traditional gender roles, even though the communist government stressed the importance of gender equality.

Women's revolutionary role also became tied to motherhood, meaning that women were seen as revolutionary heroes, but only as mothers who raised proper socialist children. Mothers were seen as the “most sacrificial model citizen,” but despite this lofty ideological position, mothers were confined to the home and to the lower social strata. The government counted on mothers to instill strong communist values in their children and support the regime at the most basic domestic level. Thus, for most women, agency was situated in the home, not in the workplace or political sphere.

During the first three months of the Korean War, the Korean People's Army installed similar women's organizations in the South during its occupation of South Korea.

=== Post-Korean War ===
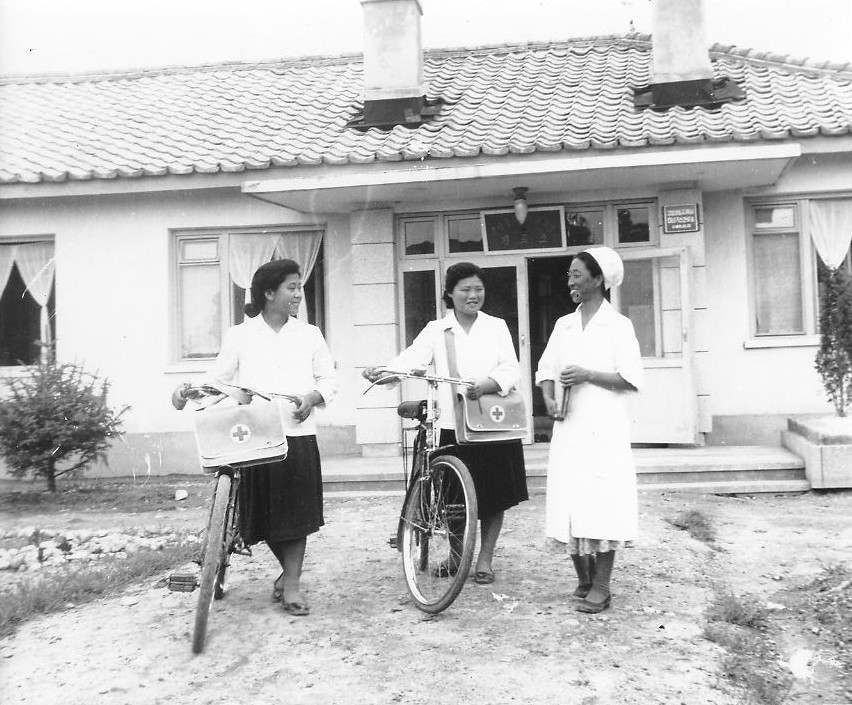
Women providing supplies for the military, June 1972, Hamhung

After the Korean War, the population ratio between the two Koreas was drastically different because of the "intense bombing". The bombings took a major toll on North Korea leaving "no more targets left to hit, which did not even happen in Vietnam". Secondly, "the DPRK lost 12–15 percent of its population during the war...Just over half the Koreans dead were men". North Korea was used "to combat the legacy of [the] colonial past." Because of these two factors, it affected the position of women in the DPRK. The importance on population growth was crucial to the development of North Korea. Women were "encouraged a high birth rate, partly by making contraception and abortion difficult to obtain". It was considered socially unacceptable for a woman to not have or want children. This position would eventually be reversed; many North Korean escapees located in China assert that forced abortions and infanticide are common within the country.

Female involvement in society was seen just as important as men. The 1972 constitution asserted that "women hold equal social status and rights with men." The fact that women were given the same roles in society and in the economy can be seen when "Women workers had increased rapidly, with "equal pay [for equal work] and special treatment". In addition, the increasing role of women in society than being simple housewives could be seen. The 1990 constitution stipulates that the state creates various conditions for the advancement of women in society. In principle, North Korea strongly supports gender equality, and established different policies regarding women's emancipation, however, in reality, North Korea remains a patriarchal society.

When North Korea was established, it began applying communist principles of gender equality. North Korea believed they could obtain gender equality through economic liberation and women's participation in economic production. For instance, Kim Il Sung said: "The women... can achieve complete emancipation only if they strive with no less devotion and awareness than men to solve the problems arising on the productive fronts of the factories and countryside" The purpose was to transfer women's duties out of the family and into productive labor for the state. Thus, theoretically, women can obtain different social positions through nontraditional roles such as paid labor.

The North Korean leaders were committed to changing traditional family, economic, and social systems and instituted new legal and social arrangements which promoted equal rights for both men and women. Political opportunities were given to women, especially in the lower echelons of the power in the regime. Regardless, "North Korean women can hardly be said to have achieved socioeconomic status equal to men's."

While economic strides were made to improve the status of women, it is clear that North Korean women do not have the equal power of property compared to North Korean men. Women are given occupations with lower wages, allowing men to become the main source of income for the North Korean family, causing a family structure dependent on men. Women were secondary contributors to the family income. As such, women who marry high-income earners tend to quit their jobs and most married women work at home. As result, there is clear declination between women in the workforce and those who rely on their husbands.

This trend is seen clearly throughout the history of Korea, and it has deep roots in Confucian ideals. It is hard to see many women in any position of power in North Korea. Women do hold one-third of the representative positions in the lower echelons of power, but with not much sway over major decisions. "As one examines the more powerful organizations such as the Central Committee (CC) and the Politburo (Political Committee) of the KWP Congress and the Administrative Council (the Cabinet), it becomes apparent that very few women have held positions of power." Since women barely have any role in the higher positions of power, they are not well represented and do not have a stake in governance. Although the societal position of women may have changed since the Choson era, the deeply en-rooted Confucian culture is still visible in contemporary North Korean society.

=== Chollima (Flying Horse) Movement ===
The Ch'ŏllima movement (Ch'ŏllima meaning "Thousand-ri horse" but translated as "Flying Horse") was a mass mobilization campaign and North Korean government initiated Chollima movement to solidify its power in the late 1950s. Chollima movement, which focused on women's policy, socialized North Korean women's housework thorough the help nurseries, kindergartens, laundries, and an efficient food industry. One member of the Women's Union said the socialization of housework in North Korea as "Children are brought up at state expense. If there is pressing and ironing [to be done] it goes to the laundries. The foodstuffs industry has been developed, so food can be bought at any time. So what is there left to do in the family?"

Chollima mass mobilization campaign increased the number of female labor. Female labor grew with the rate of over 19 percent between 1956 and 1964, which led to 49 percent of the total labor force. Also between 1963 and 1989, the number of female professionals and technicians grew 10.6 times when male professionals grew only 2.5 times. With the goal to continue raising positive statistics, women were being encouraged more and more to work towards achieving equal, if not greater, status as men had.

=== 21st century ===
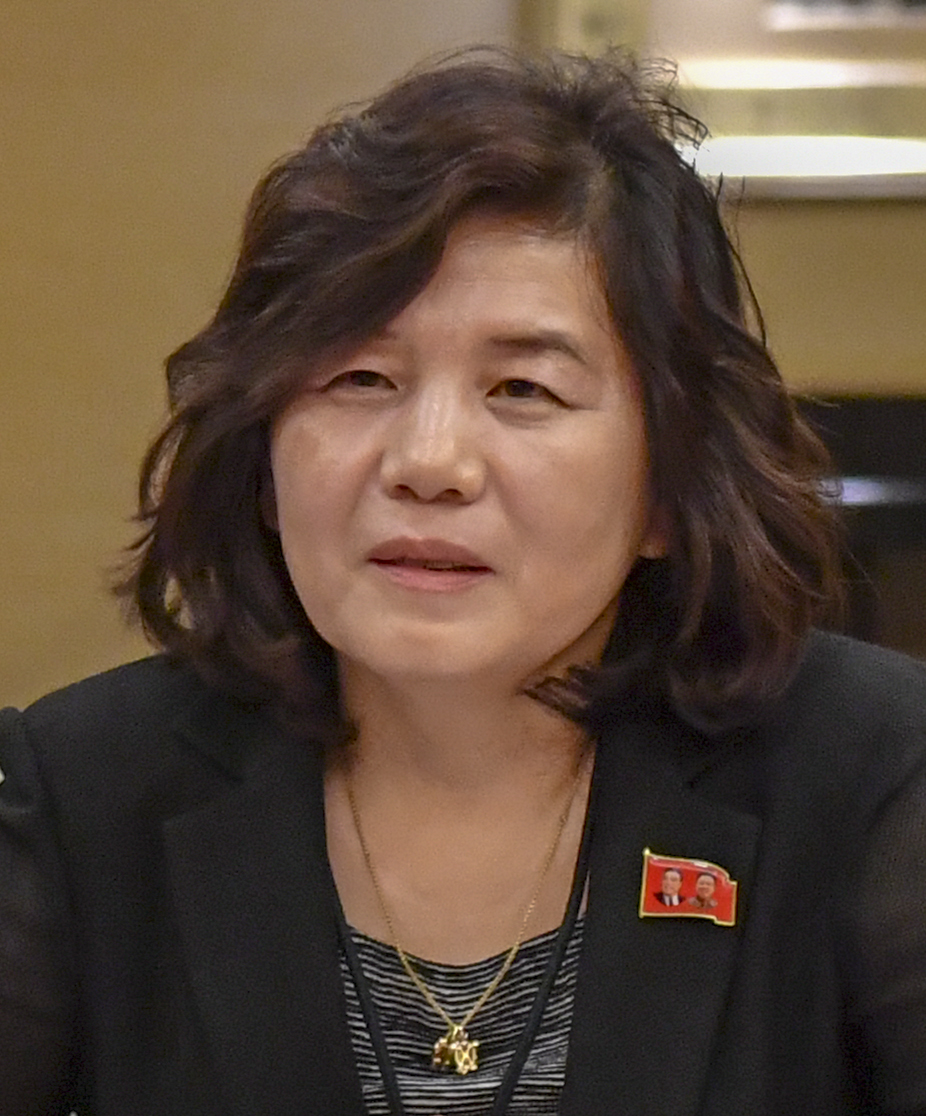
Choe Son-hui, appointed First Vice Minister of Foreign Affairs in 2018

In the 2010s, under Supreme Leader Kim Jong Un, several women have been promoted to powerful political, economic and diplomatic positions.

=== Statistics ===
Data from 1980 indicates that women occupied 56% of the labor force in the agricultural sector, 45% in the industrial sector, 20% in mining, 30% in forestry, 15% in heavy industry and 70% in light industry. The heavy emphasis on light industry aims to raise poor living standards and combat the widespread shortage of food and consumer goods. In 1989, North Korea declared the "year of light industries" and shifted more women from heavy industry to light industry. Women accounted for 80% of the school teachers, but very low in the university scene. For example, In Kim Il Sung University, women composed 10% of the faculty and 25–30% of the students. Among professionals and technicians, women accounted for only 14.6% in 1963, yet in 1989 more than 37% were women. The number of female professionals and technicians increased 10.6 times between 1963 and 1989 while that of males increased only 2.5 times.

== Laws promoting social change on North Korean women ==
The Provisional People's Committee promulgated various laws promoting social change, such as the Law on Land Reforms, the Law on Sex Equality, the Labor Law, and the Law on the Nationalization of Essential Industries.

The most progressive change in the traditional position of women was the Law on Sex Equality, announced on 30 July 1946. This law emphasized equal rights in all spheres, free marriage and divorce, and equal rights to inherit property and to share property in case of divorce. It ended arranged marriages, polygamy, concubinage, the buying and selling of women, prostitution, and the professional entertainer system.

The North Korean Labor Law defined women's rights at work. Articles 14 through 17 stipulated the rights of mothers and pregnant women, including seventy-seven days of maternity leave with full pay, paid baby-feeding breaks during work, a prohibition against overtime or night work for pregnant or nursing women, and the transfer of pregnant women to easier work with equal pay.

In addition, the Law on Nationalization of Essential Industries weakened the economic power of a patriarch by elimination of private property.

Unlike in South Korea where women struggled to abolish the family feudal system, the Democratic Women's Union of North Korea replaced family registry system based on male lineage (family feudal system) with a new citizen registry system. Therefore, giving more power to the women in purchasing and owning land.

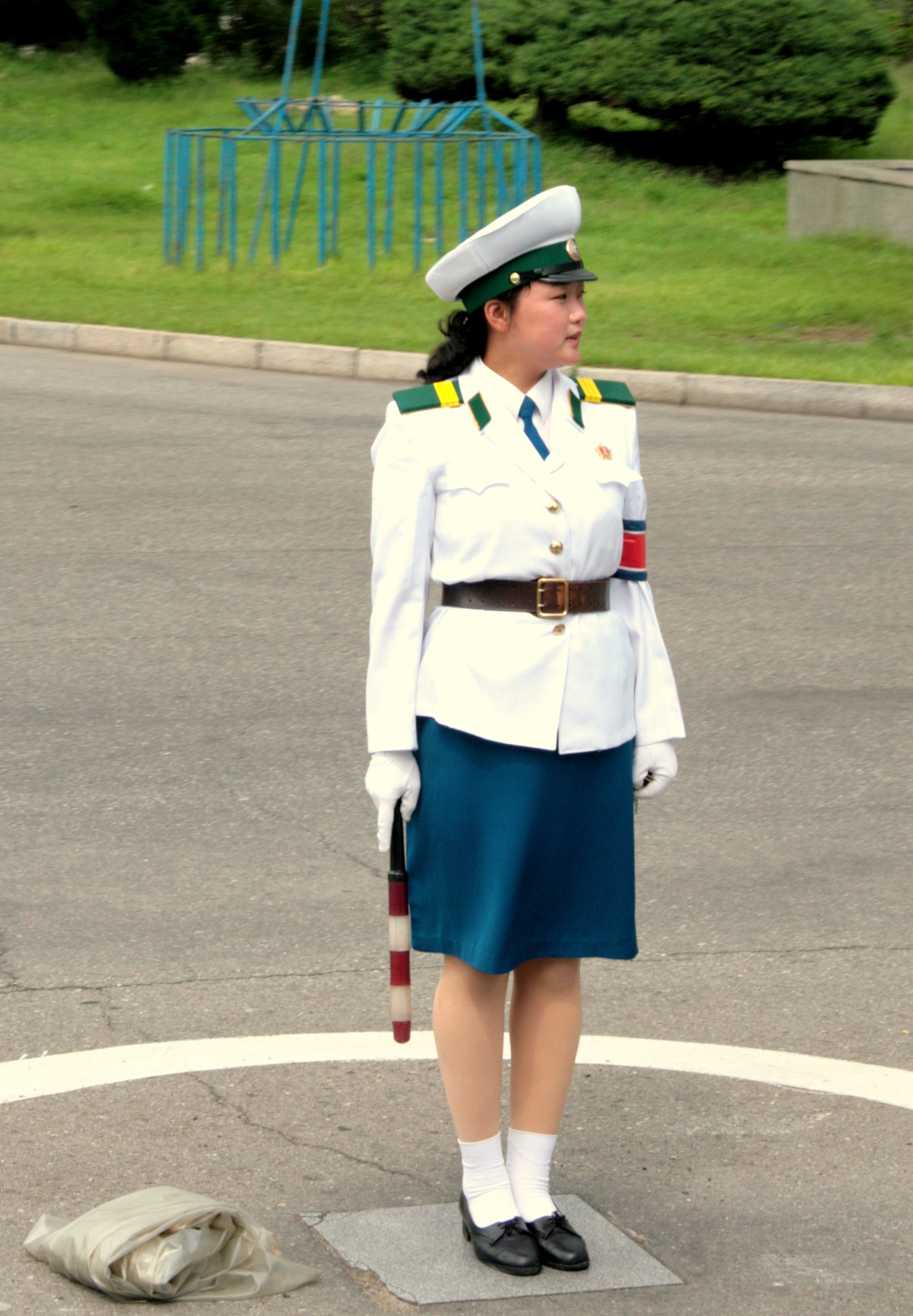
A policewoman handling traffic, August 2007

Due to these changes in society the family structure drastically changed from the traditional systems; clans eventually disappeared, the family lineage-book system was completely destroyed, and a nuclear family system began to emerge.

Although new laws were created to make women more equal to men, it is highly debatable that women in North Korea are completely equal to men in society. Opportunities for women have been greatly expanded; however, in certain aspects, they are still not equal to men in society. There is evidence that males get paid more than females in North Korea. Thus, the wage difference reflects the unequal representation of women in various occupational structures, which indicates a sexual division of labor.

== Military ==
In early 2015, the North Korean government decided to make military service mandatory for all women living inside the country's borders. The intention is to improve the country's dwindling military forces. For women ages 17 to 20 that have graduated from middle and high school, enlistment is now a requirement. Prior to 2015, women only served on a voluntary basis, whereas men have always been forced to serve.

The term of service differs, with women being free from the military at the age of 23 and men being bound for 10 years. This initiative was proposed to replenish the losses felt in the 1990s during the North Korean famine, when the country experienced widespread death, a low birth rate, and a high child mortality rate. This directive has resulted in much concern, seeing as in most North Korean families, women are the ones bringing in the money by working in illicit businesses.

In 2003, in an annual Supreme People's Assembly, the government granted a small reprieve for members of the military, reducing the term for men from 13 to 10 years and for women from 10 to 7.

== Gender equality ==
Although North Korean government officials do publicly claim that North Korea as a country is a purely stateless, classless and moneyless society, some have proven otherwise. There has been a clear divide between the wealthy, famous, educated, and politically powerful citizens, in comparison to the politically powerless. There has been an obviously unequal distribution of wealth and privilege throughout North Korea. North Koreans have been forced to be placed into subdivisions in accordance with family history and origin. If at any point in time a member of a given family is to commit a crime of any sort, the entire line of that family suffers from their crime, by becoming even lower in status.

A woman's status has never been completely equal to that of a man. Men have a far better advantage of progressing through the workforce than women of a lower class. Lower-class women are seen as having completed their career once married, which is not the case for men. On the other hand, women coming from higher ranking families are presented with much more opportunity.

== Division of labor ==
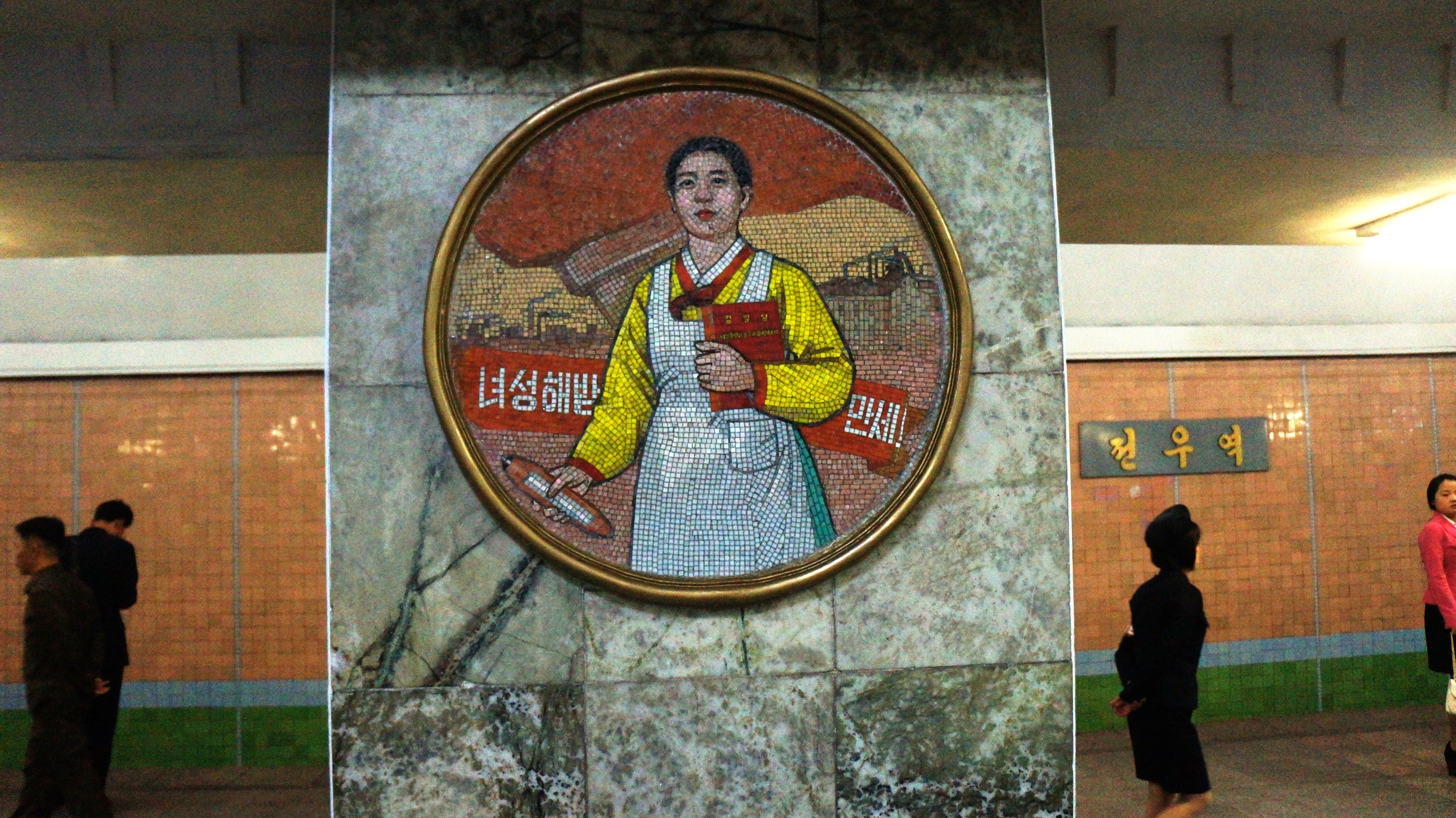
A public mosaic shows a woman holding a spindle, with the inscription "Hurrah for women!"

In North Korea, heavy manual labor is traditionally done by men, and light work is appointed to women. An individual's employment is predetermined by the state in accordance to the state's judgement of family prestige, capability, and skill set. For example, it would be highly unlikely for the state to assign a wealthy family with a high education to work constant manual labor as a miner. Ultimately, for North Korean men and women, each citizen's occupation must be completely calculated and deliberated by outside authority.

== Role in the family ==
Women's role in the family sphere and in the public sphere has changed several times from the end of World War II to this day. After the war, women were enrolled in the socialist economy in large numbers, and played a major role in the rebuilding of the country. As the economy improved in later decades, women were less needed in the workforce, and a move towards more traditional roles emerged. State employees were given rations and most families could survive on that.

During the North Korean famine of the 1990s, these rations, known as the Public Distribution System, dried up and families had to look elsewhere for financial support. Men, even though they are not receiving payment, are still required to attend their government jobs. The cash-strapped government relies heavily on the free labor they get from men and it is unlikely to discontinue this practice anytime soon.

For men to be free from work, they actually must pay their employer between 20 and 30 times their monthly salary, allowing them to take on other, more profitable jobs, such as repair work. This payment is required even if one is unable to afford food to eat, otherwise they are punished with jail time. It is rumored that the women of the family are the ones deciding if the men's skills are good enough to do this.

Illegal markets began springing up all over the country out of desperation to keep people alive. These markets became the target of a number of crackdowns and restrictions but were later relaxed. These markets have become the main source of money for the vast majority of families in North Korea, with almost half of households claiming private trading as their only source of money. Although these numbers are difficult to come by in the iron-clad North Korea, researchers believe women are the breadwinners in 80–90 percent of homes. This dramatic change has had tremendous consequences in this patriarchal society. Women across the country, empowered by their new money-making abilities, have become less obedient to their husbands and have started controlling a lot of the household decisions. Many North Korean women refer to their husbands as "puppies" or "pets," because they are unable to do anything productive but still must be taken care of and provided for. Women now make about twice and much as what men used to get paid.

But with this change, women in this country are facing increasing domestic violence. Scholars who survey North Korean defectors claim they have yet to interview a woman that hasn't experienced some sort of violence in the home. They believe it is because of the immense power shift that has occurred inside the homes of people across the country. Men are frustrated with their new-found lack of power.

Albeit with heavy obstacles, women are still leading the charge for civil disobedience, an unusual occurrence in North Korea. When new restrictions are imposed on the markets, women are very vocal and prominent in the protests.

These changes have resulted in women preferring to wait longer to get married and men being forced to accept their subordinate roles as husbands. This power change in life has resulted in another in death: it is now men that are forced to beg when their spouse dies, instead of the other way around.

== Prostitution ==
Prostitution in North Korea is illegal, but has been reported by one source to take place, including through Kippumjo – women and girls recruited by the head of state of North Korea for the purpose of proving sexual gratification for high-ranking Workers' Party of Korea (WPK) officials and their families, as well as occasionally distinguished guests.

== Media influence ==
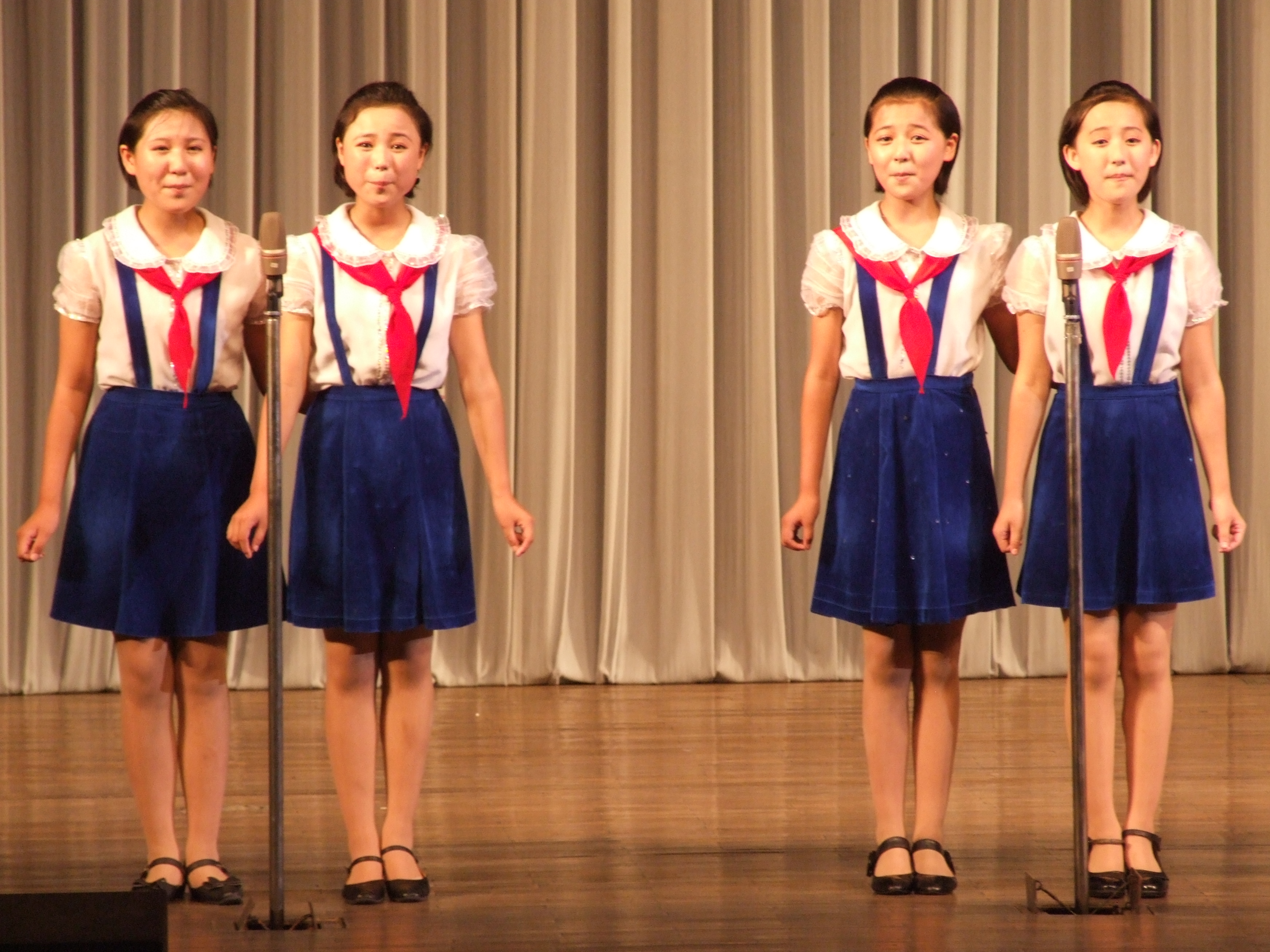
School girls at Mangyongdae Children's Palace

The media showcases role models. The official newspaper Pyongyang Times, in an August 1991 article, described the career of Kim Hwa Suk, a woman who had graduated from compulsory education (senior middle school), decided to work in the fields as a regular farmer in a cooperative located in the Pyongyang suburbs, and gradually rose to positions of responsibility as her talents and dedication became known. After serving as leader of a youth work team, she attended a university. After graduating, she became chairperson of her cooperative's management board. Kim was also chosen as a deputy to the Supreme People's Assembly.

Despite such examples, however, it appears that women are not fully emancipated. Sons are still preferred over daughters. Women do most if not all of the housework, including preparing a morning and evening meal, in addition to working outside the home; much of the responsibility of childrearing is in the hands of t'agaso (nurseries) and the school system. The majority of women work in light industry, where they are paid less than their male counterparts in heavy industry. In office situations, they are likely to be engaged in secretarial and other low-echelon jobs. Women were relieved of some of their domestic duties in order to shift their focus off their jobs. The food industry was developed to the point where women could just buy and pick up food for their families. Therefore, one of their main tasks became educating their children about communism based on their experiences.

Different sex roles, moreover, are probably confirmed by the practice of separating boys and girls at both the elementary and higher middle-school levels. Some aspects of school curricula for boys and girls also are apparently different, with greater emphasis on physical education for boys and on home economics for girls. In the four-year university system, however, women majoring in medicine, biology, and foreign languages and literature seem especially numerous.

== Personal freedoms ==
Women in North Korea, just like men, are severely restricted in everyday life: freedom of speech, freedom of movement and similar rights are tightly controlled by the state.

== Historical significance ==
Today, North Korean women exercise new forms of power, yet are simultaneously excluded from positions of real power. For example, North Korean women are the leaders of the underground (and illegal) markets. Many women are entrepreneurs, using creativity and resourcefulness to provide for their families during times of economic hardship. It is often the women who are earning money and bringing food for their families when traditional communist means of employment cannot suffice. At the same time, while some women have gained economic power, women are grossly underrepresented in the upper echelons of politics. There are very few female leaders in the Communist Party, despite their involvement in everyday politics. Although the Gender Equality Law of 1946 states in Article 2 that North Korean women have the same rights as men to vote and hold political office, few women have been able to break into the most powerful offices.

== See also ==
- Women's rights in North Korea
- Pyongyang Maternity Hospital
- Women in Asia
