= Gender inequality in North Korea =

Gender inequality in North Korea affects North Korean society differently than others. It has roots in traditional Korean society where women are mainly confined to the home. However, with the increasing global awareness of women's issues, the demand for comprehensive and reliable information on women and their concerns has also increased.

== Background ==
In traditional Korean society, women's roles were confined to the home. From a young age, women were taught the virtues of subordination and endurance to prepare for their future roles as wife and mother. Women, in general, could not participate in society as men did, and their role was limited to household matters.

=== Traditional ideas ===
Confucianism contains implicit biases towards women that may lead to gender inequality. On the surface, Analects, the classics Confucian, uses “he” much more frequently than “she”, revealing the disproportion wordings based on gender. Fundamentally, Confucianism places emphasis on the ideas of filial piety and natural order. Filial piety refers to the “attitude of obedience, devotion, and care towards one’s parents and elderly family members that is the basis of individual moral conduct and social harmony”. The Korean family view is also deeply influenced by Confucianism. The Koreans have high loyalty to their families. The Korean marriage and family still abide by the Confucian admonition of "loyalty and filial etiquette". The Koreans believe that each person lives in the world and should take on the responsibilities of marriage and family. Family members love each other and seldom betray. Korean family play is a true portrayal of the life of Korean people. Through these family plays, it is seen that the Koreans attach importance to family, and everyone is striving for their family. If a third person destroys others' marriage and family, she/he often fails to get happiness and will eventually be rewarded. Confucian marriage and family ethics play a positive role on the one hand, but on the other hand, there are certain limitations. It mainly manifests in maintaining the idea of "men are superior to women" and boosts the unequal status of men and women in marriage. It restricts women's thoughts and deeds with "three obedience and four virtues".

In the Confucian view, social relations are often unequal exchanges between those in superior and inferior positions. In the ideal Confucian home, women were expected to prioritize obedience above all other virtues, following the command of their fathers as girls, their husbands as wives, and their grown-up sons as widows. This structure reflects the larger societal dynamic of unequal interactions between individuals.

The value that governs the husband–wife relationship is based on a principle of mutuality. The underlying spirit is not dominance but division of labor. It is also important to note that a value of duty looms in Confucian family ethics. If children are involved, the role of the mother should take precedence over the role of wife.

Men and women is expected to have distinct social role that men should go out to work to support family and women stay at home to be caregivers. Besides, a virtuous woman should uphold “three subordinations”: be subordinate to her father before marriage, to her husband after marriage, and to her son in widowhood. Confucianism sees sexuality as taboo and forbid discussion about sex. It advocates sex is regulated by formal arrangements (marriage) and culminates in childbirth, so sex outside of marriage is not condoned. Virtue of chastity is particularly supposed to be abided by women, which means remaining virgin before marriage and fidelity to the husbands, alive or dead. In sexual activity, women are also supposed to keep submissive and less sexually aggressive than men.

== Gender legislation in North Korea ==
When the Soviet Russian troops occupied the area north of the 38th parallel on the Korean peninsula in August 1945, a series of revolutionary decrees were issued. The most significant decree, which is still basic to the foundation of today's North Korean socialist body politic, is the "Decree Concerning the Equal Rights of Men and Women in North Korea" which was proclaimed on 30 July 1946.

The Labor Law and the Gender Equality Rights Law establish the basic framework for defining female roles as workers and mothers in Korean society. The Labor Law promulgated on June 24, 1946, in addition to basic provisions such as the eight hour work system, paid leave, equal pay for equal work, and improving working conditions, including health insurance, also made special provisions for the protection of children and mothers.

Article 11 of the CEDAW, to which North Korea is a party, provides, “States Parties shall take all appropriate measures to eliminate discrimination against women in the field of employment in order to ensure, on a basis of equality of men and women, the same rights.”

Democracy and gender equality were stated as important legal principles in the Constitution of the Republic of Korea first promulgated in 1948. North Korea references gender equality in its socialist constitution, but the de facto social and legal circumstances that women face in the country are far below the de jure status they are purported to enjoy.

== Gender and social composition in modern North Korea ==
=== Twentieth century ===
The economic crisis that disrupted social stability in North Korea in the 1990s greatly affected the lives of women. They were previously restricted to nationally designated job positions and mainly stayed at home after marriage, mobilized through the Women's Federation. Now, these women are standing at the forefront of the economy in Jiangmadang, doing everything possible to support their families, and the system and its control are being pushed into Jiangmadang. Since the 1980s, as part of the "family work group," their experience of working from home has also enabled them to quickly enter Jiangmadang.

=== Twenty-first century ===
There are no women on the all-important National Defense Commission or the Political Bureau of the Central Committee of the WPK, which determines the party’s policies. As of 2016, according to North Korea’s report to CEDAW, women made up only 10 percent of divisional directors in government bodies, 11.9 percent of judges and lawyers, 4.9 percent of diplomats, and 16.5 percent of officials in the Ministry of Foreign Affairs.

In recent years, there has been a notable shift in the role of North Korean women. Traditionally seen as mothers, many North Korean women have become primary breadwinners. A significant number have joined the black market (jangmadang), leading to a surge in mobility as they seek economic opportunities in new cities, regions, and even across national borders. This newfound mobility and economic independence have reshaped the dynamics of contemporary North Korean families. There is an argument to be made that the traditional ideal of women as mothers under a patriarchal system has given way to a new, economically empowered model for women in North Korean society.

== Gender imbalance in North Korean defections ==
In the last 15 years, there have been significantly more female defectors than males.

== See also ==
- Gender inequality in South Korea
- Women's rights in North Korea
