= Art and Sports Personnel =

Art and Sports Personnel (Korean: 예술체육요원; Hanja: 藝術體育要員; RR: Yeseulcheyukyowon) is a service system under the Conscription in South Korea, subject to artists who have won prizes in art competitions or athletes who have won prizes in International Sports Competitions.

== History ==
The Art and Sports Personnel system was implemented in 1973 for those selected by the Specialist Selection Committee as it was recognized that those with academic, artistic, or physical specialties need to develop or demonstrate their specialties for the national interest. At that time, the relevant laws of this system were enacted on March 3, 1973, and stipulated in the Act on Special Regulations on Military Service Obligations (병역의무의 특례규제에 관한 법률), which took effect on April 3 of the same year.

== Subject ==
Selectors from the following persons;

=== Subject in the Arts field ===
- A person who has won at least second prize in the competition of an international art contest, acknowledged by the Military Manpower Administration
- A person who has won at first prize in the competition of a national art contest (in a field which has no international contest, such as Traditional Korean music, etc.), acknowledged by the Military Manpower Administration

Art contests acknowledged by the Military Manpower Administration shall be governed by the provisions related to art competitions prescribed by the "Regulations on the Assignment and Management of Art and Sports Personnel" of the Military Manpower Administration directive. Among them, international art competitions are divided into music competitions and dance competitions. A music contest is a competition joined by the World Federation of International Music Competitions under UNESCO, and a dance contest is a competition joined by the UNESCO International Dance Council or the International Theater Institute.

- International Art contest acknowledged by the Military Manpower Administration
  - Music contest
    - International Jean Sibelius Violin Competition
    - Henryk Wieniawski Violin Competition
    - International Chopin Piano Competition
    - International Violin Competition of Indianapolis
    - Van Cliburn International Piano Competition
    - International Joseph Joachim Violin Competition
    - International Max Rostal Competition for Violin and Viola
    - International Franz Liszt Piano Competition
    - International Geza Anda Piano Competition
    - Sendai International Music Competition
    - Premio Paganini International Violin Competition
    - Busoni International Piano Competition
    - International Long-Thibauds Competition for Piano and Violin
    - Chartres International Organ Competition
    - International Besancon Competition for Conductors
    - Munich International Music Competition(ARD)
    - Queen Elisabeth Competition
    - Geneva International Music Competition
    - Prague Spring International Music Competition
    - Isang Yon International Music Competition
    - Carl Nielsen International Music Competition
    - Seoul International Music Competition
    - Montreal International Musical Competition
    - Jeju International Brass Competition (odd years), Jeju International Brass & Percussion Competition (even years)
    - Michele Pittaluga International Classical Guitar Competition
    - International Musical Competition Dr. Luis Sigall
  - Dance contest
    - USA International Ballet Competition
    - Youth America Grand Prix
    - Seoul International Dance Competition (Only those who won first place in the Competition after 2022)
    - Korea International Ballet Competition (Only those who won first place in the Competition after 2022)
    - Korea International Contemporary Dance Competition
- National Art contest acknowledged by the Military Manpower Administration
  - Onnara Traditional Korean Music Competition
  - Dong-A Music Competition
  - Jeonju University Saseupnori Nationwide Contest
  - Dong-a Dance Competition
  - Nationwide Rookie Dance Contest

=== Subject in the Sports field ===
- A person who shall have won at least 3rd prize(Gold, Silver or bronze medal) in the Olympics
- A person who shall have won the 1st prize(Gold medal) in the Asian Games

=== Subject of past ===
==== Subject of past by Directive ====
Among the past subjects, those excluded by the revision of the directive are those in the art field as follows;

- Won of the following competitions during the International Arts Competition were excluded from the Military Manpower Administration designated competition;
  - International Art contest
    - Music contest
      - Won of the International Paulo Cello Competition (Excluded from July, 2019)
      - Won of the International Singing Competition of Toulouse (Excluded from 2023)
      - Won of the International Tchaikovsky Competition (Excluded from 2023)
      - Won of the Shanghai International Ballet Competition (Excluded from 2015)
      - Won of the Asia Percific International Ballet Competition (Excluded from 2015)
      - Won of the Concours International de Danse Classique de Grasse (Excluded from 2015)
      - Won of the Berlin International Dance Festival TANZOLYMP (Excluded from 2015)
      - Won of the International Dance Competition Hellas (Excluded from 2015)
      - Won of the New York International Ballet Competition (Excluded from July, 2019)
      - Won of the Helsinki International Ballet Competition (Excluded from July, 2020)
      - Won of the Rudolf Nureyev International Ballet Competition (Excluded from July, 2020)
      - Won of the International Ballet Competition and Contest of Choreographers (Excluded from 2023)
      - Won of the Competition Arabesque Ballet Competition (Excluded from 2023)
      - Won of the Varna International Ballet Competition (Excluded from 2023)
      - Won of the Prix de Lausanne International Competition (Excluded from 2023)
  - Won of the following competitions during the National Arts Competition were excluded from the Military Manpower Administration designated competition;
    - Won of the Seoul Dance Festival (Excluded from 2015)
    - Won of the Nationwide Theatrical Festival (Excluded from 2022)
    - Won of the ROK Art Festival (Excluded from 2022)

==== Subject of past by Enforcement Decree ====
- The Academic field was subject to the following subjects and was abolished in 1990.
  - An employee of an academic institution designated by the Ministry of Culture and Education who obtained a master's degree from the Graduate School of Korean Studies
  - Government-funded student studying abroad selected by the Ministry of Culture and Education
  - A person recognized by the head of the relevant central administrative organ as having made a significant contribution to the academic field
- Subject in the Sports field
  - The following subjects have been affected since 1980, but were abolished in 1985
    - A person who shall have won the 2nd and 3rd prize(Silver or bronze medal) in the Asian Games(Changed to a person who shall have won the 1st prize from 1985)
    - A person who shall have won at prize in the FIFA World Cup
    - A person who shall have won at least 3rd prize in the Universiade(Changed to a person who shall have won the 1st prize from 1985, and abolished in 1990)
    - A person who shall have won at least 3rd prize in the World championship
    - A person who shall have won at least 3rd prize in the World Junior Championships
    - A person who shall have won at least 3rd prize in the Asian Championship
    - A person who shall have won at least 3rd prize in the Asian Junior Championships
  - The following subjects were abolished in December 2007.
    - A person who shall have won at least 16th prize in the FIFA World Cup(Enforcement form 2002)
    - A person who shall have won at least 4th prize in the World Baseball Classic(Enforcement form 2006)

== Serve ==
- Form of Service: If selected, they receive basic military training within one month at an army training center(or 9th Marine Brigade Subordinate Marine Corps Training Camp in Jeju). and then work in their field of activities during the mandatory service period.
- Service period
  - Current (after 2003): 2 year 10 months(Rationale: Article 33–8, Paragraph 1 of Military Service Act)
  - Previous (before 2003): 3 years

== Controversy and criticism ==
- There is controversy and criticism that it is not fair because it is recognized as an Exemption from Military service due to working in the field of Individual activities (Art or Sports) during the service period.
- Through the Art and Sport personnel system under the Korean Conscription system, Artists and Athletes activities in their fields(Art or Sports) during Art and Sports personnel's mandatory service are considered to enforce non-military labor in the Forced Labour Convention. Therefore, it violates the Forced Labour Convention.

== See also ==
- Supplementary service in South Korea
