= Public Health Doctor =

Public Health Doctor (Korean: 공중보건의사, 公衆保健醫師) is a service system under Conscription in South Korea, which allows persons subject to conscription with a medical license to serve in doctorless villages (remote islands, etc.), public hospitals, or public health centers without doctors.

Those who are subject to conscription with a medical license are eligible for selection. The selection of those Subject to Conscription with a Medical license or in the case of some medical officer candidates. They are selected if necessary for private public hospitals. No military doctor quota has been established.

== History ==
- 1979: According to the "Act on Special Measures for Health and Medical Services in Nation Citizens"(국민보건의료를 위한 특별조치법) revised on December 8, 1978, public health work was required for those who were included in the military register of reserve officers who qualified as doctors from 1979. This is the beginning of the Public Health Doctor concept. In that year, 604 public health doctors (doctors 304, dentists 304) were deployed to farming and fishing villages.
- December 31, 1980: The "Act on Special Measures for Health and Medical Services in Nation Citizens" and "Act on the Basis for Public Health Doctors" changed to the "Act on Special Measures for Health and Medical Services in Agricultural and Fishing Villages" (농어촌 보건의료를 위한 특별조치법).
- 1990: Service status and military rank in the Public Health Doctor changed from Reserve Officer to Supplementary Private for the "Act on the Regulation of Special Cases of Compulsory Military Service(병역의무의 특례규제에 관한 법률).

== Deployed Medical facilities ==
Medical facilities that deploy Public Health Doctors include:

- Public Health Center, Public Hospital
  - Health center, health subcenter (public health center, public health center branch)
  - Public hospital designated by the Ministry of Health and Welfare (hospital established and operated by the central government, local government or public institution)
- Research Institute for Public Health and Medical Service
- Facilities prescribed in the Enforcement Decree of the Act
  - Hospital ship
  - A hospital that is supported by the government among private hospitals in the counties and small and medium-sized cities where it is difficult to secure doctors, and is determined by the Minister of Health and Welfare
  - Social Welfare facilities
  - Medical facilities in detention center and prison
  - Emergency medical facilities

== See also ==
- Supplementary service in South Korea
