= Supplementary service in South Korea =

Category of military service in South Korea

Supplementary service (Korean: 보충역; Hanja: 補充役; RR: Bochungyeok) is a category of military service in South Korea. Article 5 Paragraph 1, Subparagraph 3 of the ROK Military service act classifies supplementary service as "Persons found to be capable of serving on active duty as a result of a draft physical examination, but not determined as those subject to enlistment in the military as active duty soldiers due to the supply and demand conditions of the armed forces".

== History ==
=== 1949 to 1969 ===
- 1949: 1st Supplementary military service, 2nd Supplementary military service.
- August 1957: Supplementary military service abolished by the revision of the Military Service Act, and those who were supplementary soldiers at the time were incorporated into the 1st reserve and the 2nd Militia service according to their age.
- 1962
  - Supplementary service was re-established with the enactment of the 1st Supplementary service and the 2nd Supplementary service.
  - A defense call-up was established for supplementary service. Although it existed legally, the actual call-up under the defense call-up came after the Bangwibyeong were established in 1969.
- 1969: With the establishment of the Bangwibyeong (defense soldier) service, the 1st supplementary service was classified as a subject to defense call-up. At that time, the 1st supplementary service was called up as a Bangwibyeong and served. The purpose of the defense call-up system was to convene reserve and supplementary soldiers to defend the country in wartime, incident, or equivalent situations, and the subject of the legal defense call-up was also included in the reserve.

=== 1969 to 1994 ===
In 1962, a call of defense was established, and the call of defense in 1962, meant that after the establishment of the Bangwibyeong in 1969, they were called to serve as Bangwibyeong. In 1971, the 1st supplementary service and 2nd supplementary service were abolished and became supplementary service.

Supplementary service requiring specific qualifications (Industrial Technical Personnel, Technical Research Personnel, Art and Sports Personnel, etc. Exception supplementary service) were established in 1973, From this period, supplementary services began to be operated as alternative services in Korea. Public Health Doctor was established in 1981.

=== After 1995 ===
After the abolition of the defense call-up and Bangwibyeong in 1995, and the call-up system for public service personnel was established, the Public-Service Advocate and the International cooperation service personnel were established. and the Public Quarantine Veterinarian was established in 2006.

== Type ==
=== Physical grade, educational background, crime record ===
It is a supplementary military service for those determined as Lower physical grades, Low-educational background and Person with Crime record, and is a Supplementary service for those close to lower physical grades among the grade 1, 2, 3, and 4, which are passed in the Conscription physical examination. Among them, supplementary military service by physical grade and educational background is based on the annual Conscription examination announcement by MMA.

- Call-up and service by this type is be as follows;
  - Bangwibyeong(ko:방위병, meaning a defence soldier, a call-up system from 1969 to 1994)
  - Social Service Personnel(ko:사회복무요원, The call-up system existing from 1995 to the present.)
- Determination of lower physical grade from conscription examination: Among the physical grades corresponding to the acceptance (subject to fit) in the conscription examination, those who have been determined to be lower physical grades are eligible. Although there are differences from year to year, this applies to those who have been determined to have a physical grade IV in conscription examination since the 1990s.
  - Prior to 1987, a physical grade IV of a university student (or higher) was disposed of as a supplementary service, and the educational background of a high school graduate (or lower) was disposed of as a physical grade 3 supplementary service, It was a difference from year to year.
  - It was after 1993 that only the physical grade IV was eligible for supplementary service based on the higher educational background among the physical grades that were passed.

- Low-educational background: Supplementary military service for those whose educational background is below the standard. In general, high school dropouts and below were targeted.
  - Even high school dropouts were subject to active conscription if their physical grade I in before 1988
  - 1988 to 1991: a middle school graduate and high school dropout (physical grade I, II, III, IV)
  - 1998 to 2003: a middle school graduate and high school dropout (physical grade I, II, III, IV)
  - 2012 to 2015: uneducated, elementary school dropout, elementary graduate, middle school dropout (physical grade I, II, III, IV)
  - 2015 to 2020: uneducated, elementary school dropout, elementary graduate, middle school dropout, middle school graduate and high school dropout (physical grade I, II, III, IV)
- Person with crime record
  - May 27, 1997 to December 30, 1999: Sentenced person to 1 year or over and below 2 year imprisonment (except for suspended sentence)
  - After December 31, 1999
    - Sentenced person to 6 months or over and below 1 year 6 months imprisonment
    - Person to a suspended sentence of 1 year or over imprisonment
    - Except the 6 months or over and below 1 year 6 months in imprisonment or suspended sentence of 1 year or over imprisonment by self-injure or deceptive for evade or reduction the draft (after 2012)
- Active service of person with a lower physical grade, low-educated or person with a crime record: A person who disposes of supplementary military service based on a criminal record cannot serve on active duty. However, in the following cases, if desired, it is possible to enter the active military service by being disposed of as a subject of active draft, and in this case, it is impossible to dispose of supplementary service again.
  - Subject to Supplementary service from Determinated lower physical grade by tall is can be Active enlisted through the support of the Armed Forces Sports Unit.
  - Even those who have been treated as supplementary service due to Low-Educated can join active duty soldiers through support for those who are close to the upper body grades (those with Physical grade 1 and 2) and those with the lower physical grades of grade 3.
  - As the provisions of the Military Service Act revised (Article 65 Paragraph 8, Subparagraph 1 of the ROK Military Service Act) in April 2021 took effect in October of the same year, Those who have passed the physical grade can also be disposed of as active military enlistment if they want to enter the active service by a Physical grade 4 decision that corresponds to the lowest physical grade.

=== Those with specific qualifications ===
It is a supplementary service for persons with specific qualifications. It is called Military service exception or Special case of Military service (Korean: 병역특례; Hanja: 兵役特例; RR: Byeongyeok teukrye) in South Korea. and Until 1993, the ROK Military Service Act called it an Exception Supplementary service or Special Supplementary service(Korean: 특례보충역; Hanja: 特例補充役; RR: Teukrye bochungyeok).

- Industrial Technical Personnel(ko:산업기능요원)
- Technical Research Personnel / Expert Research Personnel(ko:전문연구요원)
- Art and Sports Personnel (ko:예술체육요원): Among those with specialties in arts and physical education, certain achievements in the competition are required. The details are as follows according to Article 68-11 of the Enforcement Decree of the ROK Military Service Act.
  - an Classic musicians, Ballerinos, Modern dancers who finished 1st and 2nd in the International art competition Acknowledged by the MMA
  - an Artists (Korean traditional musicians, etc.) who finished 1st in the Domestic (South Korean domestic) art competition Acknowledged by the MMA
  - an Athletes who finished 1st, 2nd and 3rd in the Olympic games (Olympic gold, silver or bronze medalists) or finished 1st place at the Asian games.(Asian games gold medalists)
- International cooperation service personnel (ko:국제협력봉사요원)
- a Supplementary service Requiring the qualification of a Doctor or Lawyer, etc.; The ROK Military Service Act calls it "Public Health Doctors, etc."
  - Require the qualification of a Doctor
    - Public Health Doctor (공중보건의사): Perform a Public health tasks on the Public Health Institutions (Public Health Center, etc.)
    - Doctor exclusively in charge of the draft physical examination (ko:징병전담의사): Perform a Conscription physical examination tasks on the Regional MMA conscription physical examination room.
    - International cooperative doctor (ko:국제협력의사)
  - Public Quarantine Veterinarian (ko:공중방역수의사): . require the qualification of a Vet.
  - Public-Service Advocate (ko:공익법무관): Require the qualification of a Lawyer.

== Criticism ==
Alternative service with mandatory military training under the Korean Supplementary service system is compulsory labor for non-military purposes, subject to person of those who are difficult to serve in active service (or who are not suitable for active service) and person of have a specific qualifications. This is also consistent with the forced labor standards of the International Labour Organization's Forced Labour Convention in that it is a system that enforces non-military labor under the Compulsory Military Service Act.

== See also ==
- Conscription in South Korea
- Replenishment military service
