= Forced Labour Convention =

International treaty, 1930-

Forced Labour Convention (No.29)
Convention concerning Forced or Compulsory Labour
- Member States (green) of the Convention. ILO members that did not ratify are shown in red.
- Signed: 28 June 1930
- Effective: 1 May 1932
- Condition: 2 ratifications
- Parties: 181
- Depositary: Director-General of the International Labour Office
- Languages: French and English

The Forced Labour Convention, the full title of which is the Convention Concerning Forced or Compulsory Labour, 1930 (No.29), is one of eight ILO fundamental conventions of the International Labour Organization. Its object and purpose is to suppress the use of forced labour in all its forms irrespective of the nature of the work or the sector of activity in which it may be performed. The Convention defines forced labour as "all work or service which is exacted from any person under the menace of any penalty and for which the said person has not offered himself voluntarily", with few exceptions like compulsory military service.

The convention was adopted in Geneva 28 June 1930 and came into force on 1 May 1932. By the end of 1932 ten countries had ratified the convention (Japan, Bulgaria, Spain, Norway, Denmark, Australia, Sweden, United Kingdom, Liberia, and Ireland). Austria in 1960, Luxembourg in 1964 and Malta in 1965 were the last Western European countries to ratify the convention. Canada ratified it in 2011 and as of 2022, the United States has not ratified it.

The convention was supplemented by the Abolition of Forced Labour Convention which canceled a number of exceptions to abolition in the 1930 Convention, such as punishment for strikes and as a punishment for holding certain political views.

== Exceptions ==
Article 2 of the Convention excepts from the term forced or compulsory labour the following:

(a) any work or service exacted in virtue of compulsory military service laws for work of a purely military character;
(b) any work or service which forms part of the normal civic obligations of the citizens of a fully self-governing country;
(c) any work or service exacted from any person as a consequence of a conviction in a court of law, provided that the said work or service is carried out under the supervision and control of a public authority and that the said person is not hired to or placed at the disposal of private individuals, companies or associations;
(d) any work or service exacted in cases of emergency, that is to say, in the event of war, of a calamity or threatened calamity, such as fire, flood, famine, earthquake, violent epidemic or epizootic diseases, invasion by: animal, insect or vegetable pests, and in general any circumstance that would endanger the existence or the well-being of the whole or part of the population;
(e) minor communal services of a kind which, being performed by the members of the community in the direct interest of the said community, can therefore be considered as normal civic obligations incumbent upon the members of the community, provided that the members of the community or their direct representatives shall have the right to be consulted in regard to the need for such services.

== Ratifications ==
As of July 2023, the convention has been ratified by 181 of the 187 ILO members. The ILO members that have not ratified the convention are:

- Afghanistan
- Marshall Islands
- Palau
- Tonga
- Tuvalu
- United States

UN member states which are not members of the ILO are Andorra, Bhutan, Liechtenstein, Micronesia, Monaco, Nauru, and North Korea; these states are not eligible to ratify the Convention unless they first join the ILO.

== Protocol ==
In 2014, a protocol was adopted by the International Labour Conference: P29, Protocol of 2014 to the Forced Labour Convention, 1930. The Protocol was adopted with 437 votes in favour, 8 against and 27 abstentions (there are 3 votes per member state: one for the government, one for employees, and one for employers). The Government of Thailand was the only state to vote against adoption, though it reversed its position a few days later. The protocol obligates states parties to provide protection and appropriate remedies, including compensation, to victims of forced labour and to sanction the perpetrators of forced labour. It also obligates states parties to develop "a national policy and plan of action for the effective and sustained suppression of forced or compulsory labour".

On 14 May 2015, Niger became the first state to ratify the 2014 Protocol. As of November 2016, it has been ratified by nine states: Argentina, Czech Republic, France, Mali, Mauritania, Niger, Norway, Panama, and the United Kingdom. The Protocol entered into force on 9 November 2016.

== See also ==
Later ILO conventions:

- ILO Forced Labour Convention, 1930
- Worst Forms of Child Labour Convention, 1957
- Minimum Age Convention, 1973
- Worst Forms of Child Labour Convention, 1999
- Civil conscription
- Slave Trade Act
- Conscription in North Korea
- Conscription in South Korea
  - Supplementary service in South Korea, Social service agent
- Supplementary Convention on the Abolition of Slavery
