= Asian Junior Championships =

Asian Junior Championships may refer to:

- Asian Junior Chess Championship
- Asian Junior Squash Individual Championships
- Asian Junior Cycling Championships
- Asian Junior Volleyball Championship
- Asian Junior and Cadet Table Tennis Championships
- Asian Junior Baseball Championship
- Asian Junior Championships in Athletics
- Badminton Asia Junior Championships
