= Social service personnel =

South Korean compulsory employment system

The Social Service Personnel (Korean: 사회복무요원, 社會服務要員) is a system of compulsory employment in South Korea. It is the country's largest type of transitional and alternative civilian service system. It opened on January 1, 1995. Originally called Public Service Personnel (Korean: 공익근무요원, 公益勤務要員), it was renamed in 2013 due to an amendment to the military service act.

South Korean government is progressing with the Conscription. It examines every South Korean male citizen's Physical (South Korea doesn't draft its female citizens) to see if they are qualified to serve in the military. It classifies draftees from Physical grades 1 to 6 based on their physical, and mental condition. According to the South Korean Military Service Act, physical grades 1 to 4 are Subject to Active or Supplementary service. Subjects to Active or Supplementary service are classified according to the annual conscription examination notice issued by the MMA, usually Grade 1, 2 and 3 are qualified to serve in the active military. Grade 4 are disqualified from service in the active military, and qualified for Supplementary service(call-up to social service) because of their physical or mental limitations.

== History ==
Prior to 1995, the system was called Bangwibyeong(ko:방위병). The current social service agent was a Bangwibyeong. Later, the Bangwibyeong was abolished, creating a Public Service Personnel(공익근무요원) system.

In 2012, the term Public Service Personnel was deleted, and the administrator's clerk was replaced with the Social Service Personnel(사회복무요원). The international cooperation agency and the art and physical education agency among Public Service Personnel were separated under the Social Service Personnel system.

The Social Service Personnel's five-day training course (after three weeks of basic military training) was implemented as a camp in 2015. The place is Social Service Training Center in Boeun-gun, Chungcheongbuk-do(충청북도 보은군), which also lasts five days, over 44 hours.

== Compensation ==
Social Service Personnel get little pay. Second jobs are prohibited until the worker documents their needs and is granted a job permit. The salary paid to Social Service Personnel in accounting is basically the same as for those on active duty. Only lunch and some transportation are able to be expensed and only on work days.

As of 2018, the monthly salary was 300,000-400,000 won complemented by a small lunch fee. For reference, the minimum cost of living for one person in 2017 was 991,759 won.

A double-employment permit system is available for socially disadvantaged workers, although this is similar to compulsory double labour for socially disadvantaged workers.

The Constitutional Court ruled that active duty soldiers be provided with ritual stocks from the military and that the military can allow salaries below the minimum wage (2011헌마307).

In April 2017, former Social Service Personnel "Lee da-hoon (21 years old) said, "The current Social Service Personnel's remuneration system is significantly below the minimum cost of living, violating the right to equality, property rights, and human life." The Constitutional Court of Korea issued the Constitutional Court of Korea (2017헌마374), and for the first time in the history of the Republic of Korea, the Constitutional Court for the remuneration of Social Service Personnel was referred to the Institutional Psychology.

== Form of service ==
According to the service organization and service field, it is divided into day work, day and night work, and camp work. Day work is performed from 9:00 am to 6:00 pm on weekdays. Night duty is performed according to the duty schedule previously negotiated by the service director.

Absent four weeks of basic military training, Social Service Personnel are authorized to perform civil service instead. Social Service Personnel can request a new worksite after one year of service or to escape corruption or in a hardship position.

Social Service Personnel work in social service, health/medicine, education, environmental safety or administration.

This sector is mostly responsible for the care of disabled children or the elderly with dementia. The environmental safety sector is responsible for managing facilities such as reservoirs and sewage.

Social Service Personnel working for the National Intelligence Service in administration must pass through a competitive screening. Once stationed, if they leak work details, they can be sentenced to imprisonment.

== Benefits ==
Social Service Personnel have five categories of time off from work, including annual leave, sick leave, compassionate leave, emergency leave and official holidays.

== Discipline ==
Warnings can be issued by the head of the service agency. In this case, the duty period is extended by five days per warning. After receiving more than 7 warnings, Social Service Personnel can be charged with violating the conscription law, and sentenced to imprisonment. Days spent incarcerated do not count toward the duty period.

== Comparisons ==
Sortation	Active duty	full-time reserve	Supplementary service (Social Service Personnel etc.)
Duty	active duty, reservist (after duty)	active duty only for basic military training, after that, remaining duty is served as a reservist	basic military education and discharge from military service as reservist (same for the reserve forces after that)
Identity	soldier	soldier	citizen
Duty period	Army and Marine 1 Year 9 Months, Navy 1 Year 11 Months, Air Force 2 Years	Army, Marine, Navy, all 1 year and 9 months.	1 year and 10 months on Social Service Personnel
Rank after duty	sergeant	sergeant	private
Form of duty	barracks life	commute to work and leave from home every day (weekends usually rest)	commute to work and leave from home every day or camp (two days of vacation per week)
Relative height	-	effective January 1, 1995.	effective January 1, 1995.

== Service period by type ==
Social Service Personnel enrolled after January 1, 2011, serve for 2 years. Soldiers and police officers' son/brother may serve six months as 'Social Service Personnel' even if they are above grade six.

== Education ==
=== Basic military training ===
Conscripts enrolled as a Social Service Personnel receive three weeks of basic military training at the Army Training Center, the Homeland Division, the Jeju Defense Command or the Naval Education Command. Conscripts whose period of military training received from an educational institution exceeds basic military education and do not receive military training.

=== Post deployment training ===
Training carried out after deployment includes remunerated education and job training. Social Service Personnel who have completed education receive further training by other Social Service Personnel. Refinement education is a five-day camp under the auspices of the local Military Manpower Administration, which conducts job training after basic military training and the termination of refinement education. The head of the relevant central administrative agency conducts the training. The Korea Fire Service provides job training for one week at the central fire school after placement.

== Criticism ==
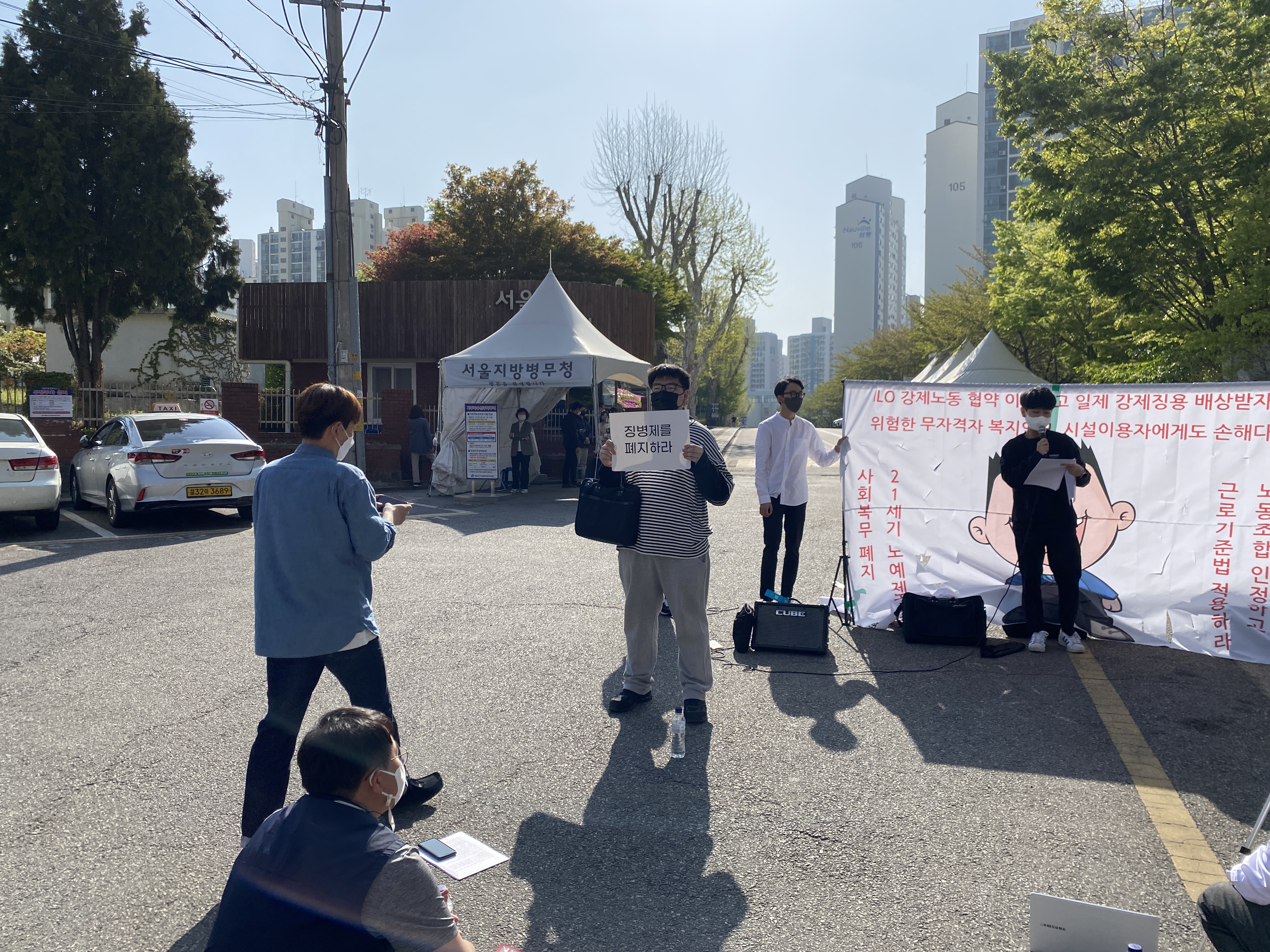
Gutgeoni burning ceremony, a protest related to the problems of the social service personnel system.(April 20, 2022, Front of Seoul Regional Military Manpower Administration.) Gutgeoni is Military Manpower Administration's Mascot character from 2012 to 2020

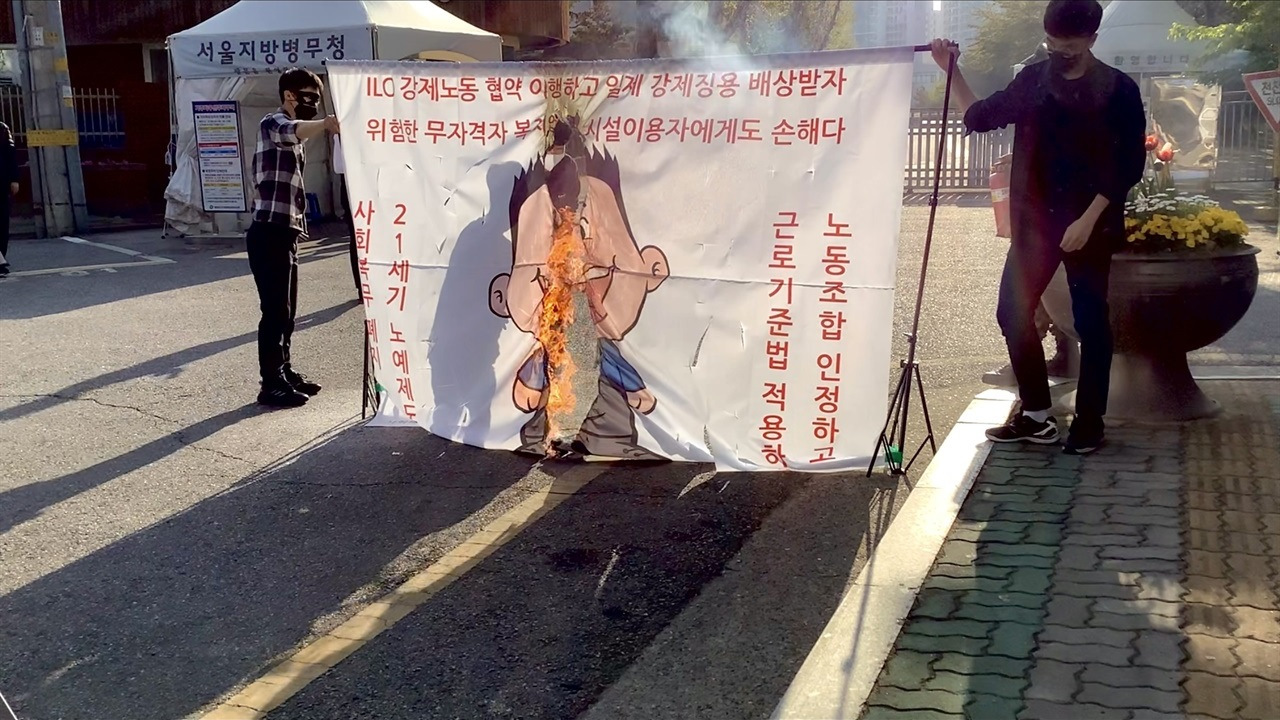
Gutgeoni burning ceremony, a protest related to the problems of the social service personnel system.(April 20, 2022, Front of Seoul Regional Military Manpower Administration.) Gutgeoni is Military Manpower Administration's Mascot character from 2012 to 2020

=== Description ===
Among the Supplementary service in the Republic of Korea, the social service personnel system is a system that enforces non-military work by conscription for those who are difficult to serve on active duty and are not suitable. This is compulsory labor because it does not constitute "any work or service exacted in virtue of compulsory military service laws for work of a purely military character;" which does not constitute "For the purposes of this Convention the term forced or compulsory labour shall mean all work or service which is exacted from any person under the menace of any penalty and for which the said person has not offered himself voluntarily." according to the ILO Forced Labour Convention.

Subject to Social Service are Lower physical grade and Criminal record.

- Person with Determination of lower physical grade from conscription examination: Person with Physical grade 4 from Conscription physical examination
- Person with Criminal record
  - Sentenced person to 6 months or over and below 1 year 6 months imprisonment
  - Person to a suspended sentence of 1 year or over imprisonment

Among them, the criteria for physical characteristics, diseases, and disabilities that are subject to social service personnel after being disposed of as supplementary service by physical grade 4 are as follows:

- Physical characteristics, illness, disability
  - Weight
    - Underweight with an under BMI 16
    - High obesity with a BMI 35 or higher(For adults, 175 centimeters tall and weighs 108 kilograms or more. High obesity between BMI 30 and 34.9 is Subject to Active duty by Physical grade 3.)
  - a Lumbar disc that Requires surgery
  - In the case of surgery for Early gastric cancer or Early colorectal cancer
  - Basal cell carcinoma
- Mental characteristics, illness, disability
  - Anxiety disorder, Panic disorder, and Obsessive compulsive disorder, etc.(In minor cases, they may be subject to active duty by physical grade 3)
  - Borderline intellectual functioning
  - Autism spectrum disorder with High functioning
  - Attention deficit hyperactivity disorder, Learning disorder(In minor cases, they may be Subject to Active duty by Physical grade 3)

Despite these physical or mental problems, there are criticisms such as "Patient abuse", "Disability draft" and "forced labor of physically or mentally challenged people" over mandatory alternative service (mandatory military training when calling up alternative services).

Critics say that it is also a "trick to avoid controversy over forced labor" to allow active-duty soldiers to join the military if they want to be dispatched as Supplementary service under the revised Military Service Act from October 2021.

This means that in a country of All volunteer military system, those who fail in the physical examination standards of military applicants, who only recruit pure applicants, must serve in active service or mandatory alternative service under the conscription system in South Korea.

Problems arising from having people without qualifications for specific tasks (special teacher qualifications, social worker qualifications, etc.) serve in special schools, welfare facilities, etc. according to the social service system, and public officials in public institutions instruct social service personnel to perform unqualified tasks(Tasks related to personal information, etc.) There are also criminal cases by social service personnel that occur as a result of problems.

This is an assault on a disabled student at a special school, including an assault by a Social service personnel at a Special school in Seoul in 2018. and These are the 2020 "Nth Room case", etc. caused by the leakage of personal information by social service personnel in public institutions.

Due to the issue, a group called the "Social service personnel Union" is demanding the abolition of the social service system, including a demonstration called the "Gutgeoni burning ceremony" in front of the Seoul Regional Military Manpower Administration on April 20, 2022.

In particular, April 20, 2022, is the day of the International Labor Organization's forced labor agreement in South Korea and also the Disabled day(South Korea's Disabled day is April 20 every year).

=== Violates the International Labour Organization Forced Labour Convention ===
According to the International Labour Organization (ILO), the Social Service Personnel system is a form of forced labor. According to the ILO Forced Labour Convention, military conscription itself does not qualify as forced labour, but national mobilization for non-military work, such as Industrial Technical Personnel(산업기능요원), Social Service Personnel(사회복무요원) does. South Korea did not join the 29/105 Convention, which prohibits forced labour. South Korea criticized the Japanese military's kidnapping comfort women and Hashima's forced recruitment of Koreans as forced labour, but rejects the comparison with the social service system. Of the 187 member states of the ILO, nine have not ratified the ILO Core Conventions 29 and 105, including the Republic of Korea.

On May 30, 2019, former Social Service Personnel "Lee da Hoon (23 years old)," together with dozens of citizens, held a press conference in front of the Constitutional Court to urge the abolition of the Social Service Personnel system and ratification of ILO Core Convention 105. He called for a constitutional appeal trial for the Social Service Personnel system.

The 50 attendees included current and former Social Service Personnel. They advocated the end of the Social Service Personnel system that forces young men who cannot qualify for military service due to physical or mental limitations to carry out other labour. They also urged the government to ratify ILO Core Conventions 29 and 105.

The Republic of Korea and the National Assembly introduced the National Defense Service in 1969. Its main task is to carry out labour unrelated to military affairs and is inconsistent with the purpose and intent of the military service system. As of 2019, hundreds of billions of treasury losses had occurred. The system extracted labour from nearly four million men in their twenties.

Social Service Personnel are remanded to assist administrative agencies and social welfare facilities. Regular employees delegate tasks to Social Service Personnel. Social Service Personnel are not trained to perform such tasks, with unknown effects on results.

Most Social Service Personnel serve in social welfare facilities with a Psycial grade 4 award for mental or physical illness.

In 2017, protesters solicited a constitutional petition for remuneration of Social Service Personnel, but this was not granted.

Protesters claimed that politicians and others were allowed to take advantage of this system to escape military service even though they had no physical impairments.

South Korean government insisted that the Social Service Personnel system is not a forced labour, but each time the ILO Secretariat issued a statement that the system violates the convention.

South Korean government modified parts of the Social Service Personnel system in October 2019, so Social Service Personnel can "choose" to serve as a military personnel if they want to - even though they were disqualified to serve in military because of their physical, mental limitations in the first place. The government insists that it is no longer a forced labour, because they give them a choice to whether to serve in military or serve in civil sector.

=== Claims of abuse ===
A Social Service Personnel serving in Seocho 1-dong Community Center in 2016 was found dead on June 22, 2016. The media reported suicide, but it is not yet known how he died. The deceased was found to have experienced severe depression.

In December 2019, it was confirmed that a civil servant who had been hired for less than one to two months had instructed a Social Service Personnel to sort 35,000 masks by himself. The relevant official posted a letter stating that a Social Service Personnel was unable to perform this task. "I asked the Social Service Personnel to distribute the goods in envelopes, and I had a hard look," she said. This stimulated a controversy, leading the official to delete his post and offer an apology. "I apologize for not thinking in advance that rash behavior will hurt someone," she said. "There was a problem with my behavior entirely, and through conversations I learned a false perception I didn't even think about. I will change my preoccupied thoughts and actions. ”

An anonymous former Social Service Personnel published a website written in English to reveal how Social Service Personnel are treated in South Korea.

=== Foreign trade impacts ===
Lee Da-hun submitted 13 chapters of amicus curiae briefs on 9 January 2019 to the panel of experts during the final stage of the European Union-Korea free trade agreement dispute resolution process proposed by the EU in the absence of ILO ratification efforts.

The Expert Panel for Dispute Resolution was to begin on 30 December 2019, and finish before 30 March 2020, when a report on whether the system violated the FTA. In that case the EU can implements sanctions, such as tariffs, IPR regulations, and foreign investment reductions.
