= Conscription in South Korea =

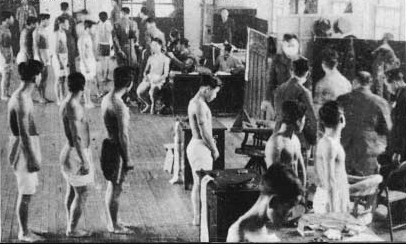
First conscription examination, conducted on 16 December 1949, after liberation from Japanese colonial rule

Since 1957, South Korea has required male citizens between the ages of 18 and 35 to perform compulsory military service. Women are not required to perform military service, but they may voluntarily join the military.

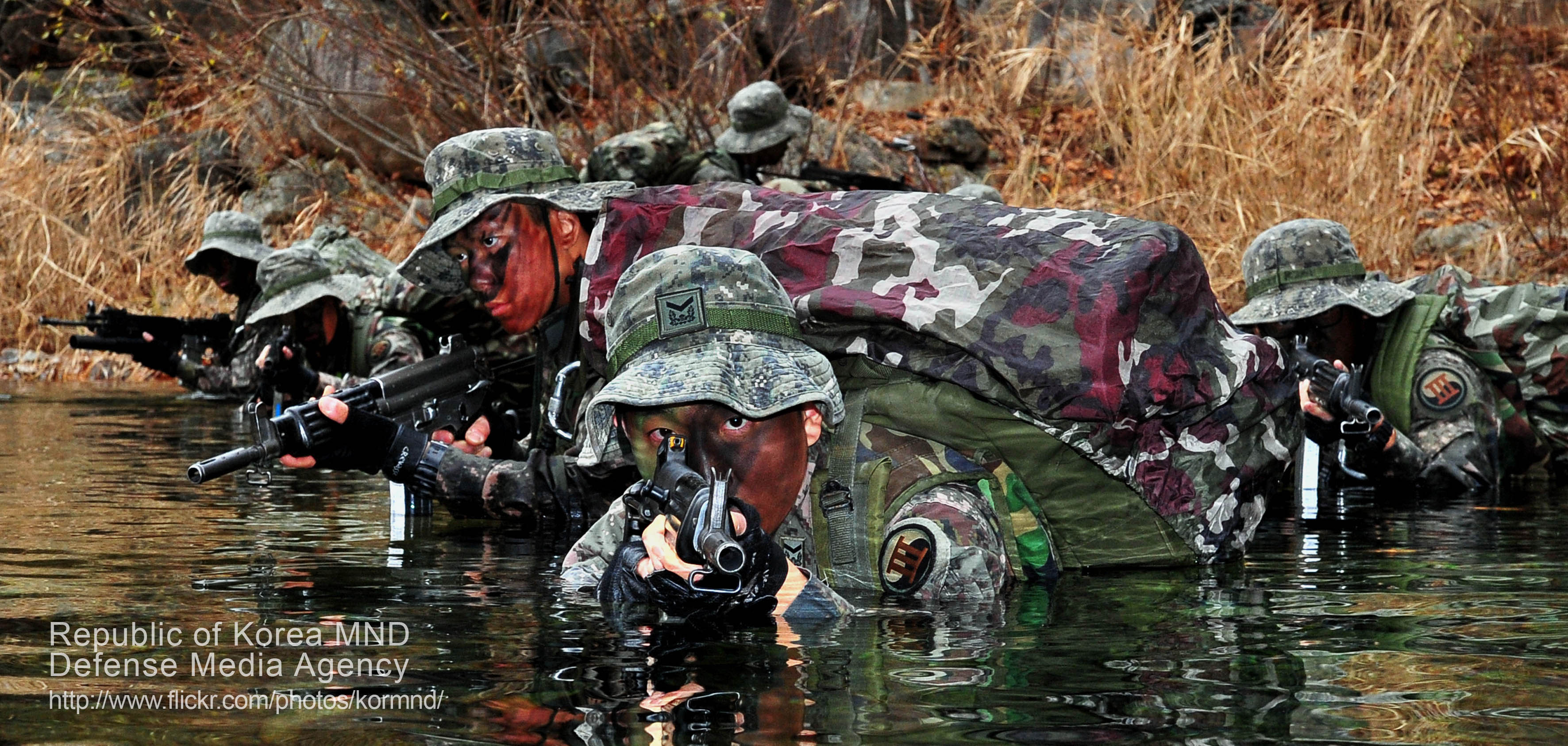
South Korean soldiers in training

== Establishment ==
The basis for military conscription in South Korea is the Constitution of the Republic of Korea, which was put into effect on 17 July 1948. The constitution states in Article 39, "All citizens shall have the duty of national defense under the conditions as prescribed by [the] Act."

In addition, the conscription is defined and acted by the "Military Service Act" (병역법; Byeong-yeok-beob). According to the "Military Service Act" Article 3, "Every male citizen of the Republic of Korea shall faithfully perform mandatory military service, as prescribed by the Constitution of the Republic of Korea and this Act. A female may perform only active service or reserve service through volunteering," and "Except as provided in this Act, no special case concerning mandatory military service shall be prescribed". The Constitutional Court of Korea confirmed that only males are drafted, declaring in 2006 that it is the government's right to decide who is subject to conscription and that there is no constitutional error in the government's decisions. Conscription is managed by the Military Manpower Administration, which was created in 1948.

== Enlistment and impairment-disability evaluation ==
By law, when a South Korean man turns 18 years old, he is enlisted for "preliminary military service"(previously "first citizen service"), meaning he is liable for military duty, but is not yet required to serve. When he turns 19 years old (or, in some instances, 20 years old), he is required to undergo an Impairment & Disability evaluation to determine whether he is suitable for military service. Men must enlist by the time they turn 28.

There are seven possible grades for the evaluation with corresponding outcomes, according to the Military Service Act. Men who receive a grade of 1, 2, or 3 are subject to enlistment into active duty service, but may be placed in supplemental service or second citizen service due to other factors (such as educational background and age). Men who receive a grade of 4 or 5 are not subject to active military service, but may be placed in second citizen or supplemental service. Grade 6 is the only level fully exempt from military service, with Grade 7 requiring a follow-up within two years for requalification. Grades 4, 5, and 6 correspond to increasing levels of disability, with 4 being considered "minor" and 6 constituting significant impairment.

== Service types and length ==
=== Grade 1, 2, 3 and 4: those are suitable for military service (현역/Hyeon-yeok) ===
The length of compulsory military service in South Korea varies based on military branch. Active duty soldiers serve 1 year 6 months in the Army or Marine Corps, 1 year 8 months in the Navy, or 1 year 9 months in the Air Force. After conscripts finish their military service, they are automatically placed on the reserve roster and are obligated to attend annual military training for 8 years (5 years from 2021).

Non-active duty personnel, or "supplemental service" personnel serve for various lengths: 1 year 9 months for social work personnel (better known as public service workers - personnel ordered to do public service work at places that require auxiliary workers such as local community centers like city halls, government agencies, and public facilities like subway stations); 2 years 10 months for arts and sports personnel or industrial technical personnel; and 3 years for public health doctors, lawyers, veterinarians, or expert researchers.

In 2010, there was growing public pressure to either shorten the length of conscription or to switch to voluntary military service, and calls from experts for a gradual phasing out of conscription rather than complete abolition. However, in December 2010, after taking into consideration of the 2010 ROKS Cheonan sinking and Bombardment of Yeonpyeong incidents, the South Korean government said it would not reduce service periods.

=== Grade 4: those are unsuitable for military service ===
==== Art and sports personnel ====
Artists and players who have won government accredited competitions are allowed to work as 'Art and Sports Personnel'. After a month of military training, Art and Sports Service agents work through their specialties to finish their military services; e.g. in professional sports teams, art galleries, museums or orchestra bands. Unlike other service agents who are working at factories, farms, universities, institutes or nursing homes, Art and Sports Service agents are allowed to work abroad.

Former president Park Chung Hee introduced exemptions for athletes in 1973 to win more medals for the country; some historians believe this also served as a distraction against the government's unpopularity. After winning a gold medal at the 1976 Summer Olympics, wrestler Yang Jung-mo was granted the first exemption. In the 1980s, president Chun Doo-hwan promised exemptions to any athlete who won a medal of any kind at either the 1986 Asian Games or the 1988 Summer Olympics.

When South Korea co-hosted the FIFA World Cup in 2002, their national football team was guaranteed an exemption if they reached the round of 16; the same promise was made to the national baseball team in 2006 if they reached the semifinals of the World Baseball Classic. Public outrage ensued, and similar exemptions have been rarely granted since.

Current conscription regulations stipulate that athletes who win medals in the Olympic Games or gold medals in the Asian Games are granted exemptions from military service and are placed in Grade 4. They are required to do four weeks of basic military training and engage in sports field for 42 months. After that, they are automatically placed on the reserve roster, and are obligated to attend a few days of annual military training for six years. In practice, after athletes finish their four weeks of basic military training, they are able to continue their own sports career during the 34 months of duty.

The policy has resulted in coaches being accused of selecting players desperate to avoid military service instead of choosing the best athletes. Parents encourage their children to pursue sports in hopes of them receiving an exemption.

Notable athletes who have been granted exemptions from military service are the bronze medal-winning men's football team at the 2012 Summer Olympics, 2008 Olympic gold medalist badminton player Lee Yong-dae, swimmer Park Tae-hwan, 2014 Asian Games gold medalist tennis player Chung Hyeon, 2018 Asian Games gold medalist footballer Son Heung-min, and 2026 Asian Games gold medalist golfer Tom Kim.

Esports players were not exempt from conscription until 2023, when esports became a regular event at the 2022 Asian Games. Because esports had become a medal event in these games, it became possible for players to be exempt from conscription, so long as they won a gold medal in the games. The gold medal-winning roster of the country's national esports team became the first players to be granted the exemption.

A total of 220 exemptions were granted from 2008 to 2018.

Exemptions are also granted to classical musicians and ballet performers who win first place in stipulated international-level competitions. A two-year extension for notable K-pop artists (from a law that was passed in December 2020) could also be given by government for their career, the age for joining military is 30 (which previously was 28). Some resources and media outlets claim that the primary reason for this amendment was singer-songwriter Jin, who, at the time, was about to turn 28. As his group BTS has had a huge impact (especially in the music industry) worldwide and contributed greatly to the spread of Korean culture and the Hallyu Wave, exemptions for them were in talks for a few years. Despite this, BTS' record label, Big Hit Music, announced on 17 October 2022, that Jin withdrew his enlistment deferral request and will be the first in the group to enter into mandatory military service, with the other members of BTS enlisting at later dates. Eventually, all members of BTS completed their service by June 2025.

At the 2026 Asian Games, South Korea won the gold medal in football. Several players including Yang Min-hyeok, Park Seung-soo, and captain Lee Gi-hyuk, made comments boasting their military service exemptions. While the players later apologized, minister of culture, sports and tourism Chae Hwi-young announced that the government will review the military service exemption for gold-medal winning athletes following public backlash.

=== Conscientious objection ===
The right to conscientious objection was not recognized in South Korea until 2020. Over 400 men were typically imprisoned at any given time for refusing military service for political or religious reasons in the years before right to conscientious objection was established.

On 28 June 2018, the South Korean Constitutional Court ruled the Military Service Act unconstitutional and ordered the government to accommodate civilian forms of military service for conscientious objectors. Later that year on 1 November 2018, the South Korean Supreme Court legalized conscientious objection as a basis for rejecting compulsory military service.

== Equipment ==
The Ministry of National Defense has revealed that it failed to provide sneakers to 7,411 recruits who joined the military from 22 May to 4 June 2012, after the budget was insufficient for need. The Defense ministry originally projected the cost of each pair of sneakers to be 11,000 KRW. However, the actual cost turned out to be 15,000 KRW.

The office of National Assembly member Kim Kwang-jin of Democratic United Party revealed that cadets in Korea Military Academy were provided with sneakers worth 60,000 KRW and tennis shoes. Cadets in Korea Army Academy at Yeongcheon were provided with sneakers worth 64,250 KRW, in addition to running shoes and soccer shoes.

== Dual citizens ==
For dual citizens, or those with multiple citizenships other than voluntary naturalization, male South Koreans must choose their citizenship by the time they turn 18, before 31 March of that year. If these males choose to revoke their South Korean citizenship, they will not be required to complete their mandatory military service. However, if they fail to choose their citizenship by their 18th year, they will be obliged to fulfill their mandatory military service and, for those who wish to maintain multiple citizenships, to give an oath not to exercise foreign nationality within two years after finishing military service. Males who choose to renounce their citizenship by their 18th year are ineligible to gain a South Korean permanent residence visa (F series) until after they turn 40 years of age, though they may still be able to receive an E series visa.

There have been cases of Koreans abroad (e.g. Korean Americans) being forced to serve in the military, as they were unaware they were actually citizens of South Korea. This happens when these people visit South Korea. One cause of this is the inadvertent inclusion on the family register.

=== Travel outside Korea ===
Before 1962, men who had not completed their conscription were almost entirely barred from leaving the country (except for international sporting events or conferences), and even those who had completed their service were required to obtain the approval of the Minister of National Defense before leaving South Korea, until they reached the age of 40. In 1962, the Military Service Act was revised to permit travel outside Korea, but it required government approval ("국외여행허가", permission for overseas travel), as well as a guarantor until 2005. Until 2007, such permission was required from the age of 18 until the man completed his military service; in 2007, the requirement was relaxed to apply only from the age of 25 to those who had not completed their service.

Permission is generally granted to members of the diaspora — those who have lived outside Korea since birth, or who left Korea before the age of six — provided that they do not stay in South Korea for more than three years, up to the maximum enlistment age of 40.

The conditions attached to permission for those who have not completed their conscription vary according to the reason for travel, but the time spent abroad cannot exceed two years in total, and no single trip may exceed one month. Those serving as social service personnel or as arts and sports personnel are not subject to a maximum age; those in "preliminary military service" are restricted to the age of 27.

== Racial minorities ==
In 2011, the government dropped race-based requirements for mixed-race Korean nationals conscripted into the armed forces. However, there currently is no law allowing non-ethnic Korean citizens conscription into the armed forces. All naturalized citizens and citizens not of partial Korean ethnicity have a choice of whether to enlist or not.

== Controversies ==
=== Violation of Forced Labour Convention ===
The Forced Labour Convention explicitly excludes "any work or service exacted in virtue of compulsory military service laws for work of a purely military character" from its scope. However, ILO defines conscription of non-military purpose as forced labour.

According to ILO, South Korean conscription violates the forced labour convention, because South Korea enrolls men with disabilities for non-military purposes. A majority (+90%) of the "Reserve - class 4 -" group work as "social service agents" (사회복무요원), and earn far less than the minimum legal wage at various fields, including government offices, subway stations, tax offices, post offices, and sanitaria.

In April 2021, South Korea ratified the Forced Labour Convention, but conscription remained in place. South Korea changed its conscription law by providing "right to decide to be enrolled" to "reserve - class 4 -. those with minor disabilities". South Korea claims that this change makes the conscription legitimate because "reserve - class 4" now have the right to decide their methods of conscription between soldiers with active duty and "social service agents". However, ILO continues to argue that enforcing "reserve - class 4-" to work as a "social service agent" is a violation of the Forced Labour Convention.

=== Lowering standards of acceptance ===
In recent years, the South Korean government has been preparing a policy to lower conscription standards for mental and physical conditions that were previously considered exempt, in light of concerns that the country's low birthrate will lead to fewer conscripts; South Korea had the lowest fertility rate in the world in both 2020 and 2021. Experts have stated that such actions will lead to wider problems already present in the military, by recruiting personnel who would not be able to adapt to the closed military.

== Draft evasion ==
In general, the South Korean public tends to be intolerant towards men who attempt to evade mandatory military service or receive special treatment, especially if they are exploiting family wealth or political connections. Draft evasion is a punishable crime, but many entertainers, athletes, politicians and their children are known to have fabricated medical or other reasons to seek exemption from military service. According to a 2017 report by the Military Manpower Administration, the most common evasion tactic was extreme weight loss or gain (37%), followed by fabrication of mental illness (23.7%), and deliberate full-body tattoos (20.3%). Studying abroad or migrating overseas to obtain foreign citizenship are considered the preferred option for sons in wealthy families, while nearly a hundred high-ranking politicians including sitting members of the National Assembly have managed to arrange unexplained exemptions for their sons. These cases of draft evasion are to be distinguished from conscientious objection on political or religious grounds.

=== Yoo Seung-jun (Steve Yoo) ===
In 2002, just before South Korean pop singer Yoo Seung-jun was due to be drafted for his military service, he became a naturalized U.S. citizen. He was born in Seoul and migrated to the United States at the age of 13. He had already obtained U.S. permanent residency and, in order to evade military service, went to Los Angeles, where he acquired citizenship within two months, subsequently renouncing his Korean nationality. The South Korean government considered it an act of desertion and deported him, banning him from entering the country permanently. In February 2017, Yoo lost his second and final appeal regarding his entry ban which prohibited him from entry and any further appeals. However, citing procedural irregularities, the South Korean Supreme Court re-opened the case in July 2019 and sent the case to the Seoul High Court, ordering them to retry Yoo's case. In November 2019, the appeals court reversed the ban, paving the way for Yoo to return to the country, pending approval of a visa. One of Yoo's visa requests was denied in July 2020 by the Los Angeles Consulate, citing Korean law that allows discretion in denying visas to applicants who "pose[ ] a threat to public interest."

== Legal Military service age ==
The age standard is from 1 January to 31 December of the year of age.

- ■: Age group of Mandatory Military service
- ■: Age group of Mandatory Military service in Wartime

Age	Mandatory military service	Duty of conscription examination and enlist, etc.	Type of service	Note
17 or younger	Military Manpower Administration takes over the Identity registration data of persons (17-year-old male) who are enrollment to Military Service Registration (Assignment the Preliminary Military Service) in the following year from the Ministry of the Interior, and transmits them to the Local Military Manpower Office.			
18	Subject for Mandatory Military service of Peacetime	No, but voluntary enlistment possible.	Assignment the Preliminary Military Service.; Persons with disabilities registered under the Disabled registration system is Wartime Labor Service or Exemption from Military Service.^{Note 1}	1.Age group subject to Civil Defense Corps under the Framework Act on Civil Defense from the age of 20; 2.Subject to a return order from the chief of staff of each military if he desertied while serving on the basis of active duty soldiers. 3.Reserve soldiers and Completed their service Supplementary soldiers in the Age group of Exemption from Duty of conscription examination and enlist, etc.(38 to 40 years old, 38 to 45 years old in Wartime) can be assigned to the Reserve Force according to the Reserve Forces Act on a wartime basis.
19 to 35	Subject for Mandatory Military service of Peacetime	All Military service obligators are obligated to Conscription examination and Enlist/Call-up(Passed person from Conscription examination. Active duty is Enlist, Supplementary Service is Call-up)	1.According to the results of the Conscription examination.(Military Disposition. Active duty, Supplementary service, Wartime labor service or Exempted from Military service); 2.When the Mandatory service(Active service) period is completed, they are transferred to reserve service.	
36 to 37	Subject for Mandatory Military service of Peacetime	1.In the peacetime, General Military service obligators are no Conscription examination and Enlist/Call-up 2.In the peacetime, Military Service Act Violators, Oversea stayer, etc. are obligated to Conscription examination. When disposed of as a Supplementary service, there is an Obligation to convene Public service. 3.In the wartime, All Military service obligators are obligated to enlist as conscription examination and active duty.	1.Same as above. 2.Military Service Act Violators, Overseas stayer, etc. are Subject to Supplementary service, Wartime Labor Service or Exempted from Military service according to the results of the Conscription examination.	
38 to 40	Subject for Mandatory Military service of Peacetime	In any case, No duty of Conscription Examination and Enlist.	Same as above.	
41 to 45	1.End of Mandatory Military service from Peacetime(Soldier ranks); 2.Extension of Mandatory Military service from Wartime	In any case, No duty of Conscription Examination and Enlist.	Exemption from Service for Active Soldiers, Reserve Soldiers, Supplementary Soldiers, Wartime Labor Service in Peacetime^{Note 2}	Reserve soldiers and Completed their service Supplementary soldiers can be assigned to the Reserve Force according to the Reserve Forces Act on a Wartime basis.
46 or older	End of Mandatory Military service from Peacetime and Wartime. Exemption from Service for Active, Reserve, Supplementary Soldiers, Wartime Labor Service in Peacetime and Wartime^{Note 2}			Expanded 50 years of age for the Wartime Civil Defense Corps
Note 1: Some disabled person (mild disabled person). If the disability status of a disabled person changes at the age of 19, or if a reason for the return of the disabled registration card occurs, a Conscription Examination shall be performed. Note 2: Republic of Korea Armed Forces soldier (Byeong) ranks: English / / / / Korean; Army / Navy / Air Force / Marine Corps / Korean; Sergeant / Petty Officer Second Class / Staff Sergeant / Sergeant / 병장; Corporal / Petty Officer Third Class / Senior Airman / Corporal / 상등병; Private First Class / Seaman / Airman First Class / Lance Corporal / 일등병; Private Second Class / Seaman Apprentice / Airman / Private First Class / 이등병; Note 3: Retirement of Officers, Warrant officers, and Noncommissioned officers when they reach retirement age of rank from Military Personnel Management Act.

== History of military service age ==
=== 1971 to 1984 ===
Age	Mandatory military service	Duty of conscription examination and enlist, etc.	Type of service
17 or younger	—	None.	—
18 to 19	Subject for Mandatory Military service of Peacetime	None.	Assignment the 1st Citizen Service.
20 to 30	Subject for Mandatory Military service of Peacetime	All Military service obligators are obligated to Conscription examination and Enlist/Call-up (Passed person from Conscription examination. Active duty is Enlist, Supplementary Service is Call-up)	1.According to the results of the Conscription examination. (Military Disposition. Active duty, Supplementary service, Wartime labor service or Exempted from Military service); 2.Those who are not Active (Serving), Reserve, or Supplementary Service are the 1st Citizen service. 3.When the Mandatory service (Active service) period is completed, they are transferred to Reserve service.
31 to 35	Subject for Mandatory Military service of Peacetime	1.In peacetime, All Military Service Obligators (Including those Military Service Act Violators, Oversea stayer, etc.) are no Conscription examination, Enlist, Supplementary Service Call-up (Exemption from Call)^{Note 1} 2.In the wartime, All Military service obligators are obligated to enlist as conscription examination and active duty.	1.Same as above. 2.The 1st Citizen service that has not been Conscription examination and those Subject to Active Enlist (Subject to draft) who have not been notified of Active draft are transferred to Supplementary service.
36 to 40	Subject for Mandatory Military service of Peacetime	In any case, No duty of Conscription Examantion and Enlist.	1.Same as above. 2.The 1st Citizen service that has not been Conscription examination and those Subject to Active Enlist (Subject to draft) who have not been notified of Active draft are transferred to Supplementary service.
41 to 45	1.End of Mandatory Military service from Peacetime (Soldier ranks); 2.Extension of Mandatory Military service from Wartime	In any case, No duty of Conscription Examantion and Enlist.	Exemption from Service for Active Soldiers, Reserve Soldiers, Supplementary Soldiers, Wartime Labor Service in Peacetime^{Note 2}
46 or older	End of Mandatory Military service from Peacetime and Wartime. Exemption from Service for Active, Reserve, Supplementary Soldiers, 2nd Citizen Service in Peacetime and Wartime^{Note 2}		
Note 1: According to Article 7 of the Military Service Act Addenda in 1971, Military Service Act Violators(Conscription examination or Enlist refusers/dodgers) as of the enforcement year(1971) are obligated to Conscription examination and enlist. Note 2: Retirement of Officers, Warrant officers, and Noncommissioned officers when they reach retirement age of rank.

=== 1984 to 1993 ===
Age	Mandatory military service	Duty of conscription examination and enlist, etc.	Type of service
17 or younger	a 17-year-old person (17-year-old male) must report the incorporation of the 1st Citizen service to the Town mayor or Village Chief.	No, But Possible the Voluntary enlist.	
18	Subject for Mandatory Military service of Peacetime	No, But Possible the Voluntary enlist.	not enlisted from 1st Citizen Service
19 to 30	Subject for Mandatory Military service of Peacetime	All Military service obligators are obligated to Conscription examination and Enlist/Call-up (Passed person from Conscription examination. Active duty is Enlist, Supplementary Service is Call-up)	1.According to the results of the Conscription examination. (Military Disposition. Active duty, Supplementary service, Wartime labor service or Exempted from Military service); 2.Those who are not Active (Serving), Reserve, or Supplementary Service are the 1st Citizen service. 3.When the Mandatory service (Active service) period is completed, they are transferred to Reserve service.
31 to 35	Subject for Mandatory Military service of Peacetime	1.In the peacetime, All Military Service Obligators (Including those Military Service Act Violators, Oversea stayer, etc.) are no Conscription examination, Enlist, Supplementary Service Call-up (Exemption from Call); 2.In the wartime, All Military service obligators are obligated to enlist as conscription examination and active duty.	1.Same as above. 2.The 1st Citizen service that has not been Conscription examination and those Subject to Active Enlist (Subject to draft) who have not been notified of Active draft are transferred to Supplementary service.
36 to 40	Subject for Mandatory Military service of Peacetime	In any case, No duty of Conscription Examantion and Enlist.	1.Same as above. 2.The 1st Citizen service that has not been Conscription examination and those Subject to Active Enlist (Subject to draft) who have not been notified of Active draft are transferred to Supplementary service.
41 to 45	1.End of Mandatory Military service from Peacetime (Soldier ranks); 2.Extension of Mandatory Military service from Wartime	In any case, No duty of Conscription Examantion and Enlist.	Exemption from Service for Active Soldiers, Reserve Soldiers, Supplementary Soldiers, Wartime Labor Service in Peacetime^{Note}
46 or older	End of Mandatory Military service from Peacetime and Wartime. Exemption from Service for Active, Reserve, Supplementary Soldiers, 2nd Citizen Service in Peacetime and Wartime^{Note}		
Note: Retirement of Officers, Warrant officers, and Noncommissioned officers when they reach retirement age of rank.

=== 1994 to 2010 ===
Age	Mandatory military service	Duty of conscription examination and enlist, etc.	Type of service
17 or younger	a 17-year-old person (17-year-old male) must report the incorporation of the 1st Citizen service to the Town mayor or Village Chief. (Before 5 February 1999); Military Manpower Administration takes over the Identity registration data of persons (17-year-old male) who are enrollment to Military Service Registration (Assignment the Preliminary Military Service) in the following year from the Ministry of the Interior, and transmits them to the Local Military Manpower Office. (After 5 February 1999)		
18	Subject for Mandatory Military service of Peacetime	No, but voluntary enlistment is possible.	Assignment the 1st Citizen Service. Persons with disabilities registered under the Disabled registration system is Wartime Labor Service or Exemption from Military Service.
19 to 30	Subject for Mandatory Military service of Peacetime	All Military service obligators are obligated to Conscription examination and Enlist/Call-up (Passed person from Conscription examination. Active duty is Enlist, Supplementary Service is Call-up)	1.According to the results of the Conscription examination. (Military Disposition. Active duty, Supplementary service, Wartime labor service or Exempted from Military service); 2.When the Mandatory service (Active service) period is completed, they are transferred to reserve service.
31 to 35	Subject for Mandatory Military service of Peacetime	1.In the peacetime, General Military service obligators are no Conscription examination and Enlist/Call-up 2.In the peacetime, Military Service Act Violators, Oversea stayer, etc. are obligated to Conscription examination. When disposed of as a Supplementary service, there is an Obligation to convene Public service. 3.In the wartime, All Military service obligators are obligated to enlist as conscription examination and active duty.	1.Same as above. 2.Military Service Act Violators, Overseas stayer, etc. are Subject to Supplementary service, Wartime Labor Service or Exempted from Military service according to the results of the Conscription examination.
38 to 40	Subject for Mandatory Military service of Peacetime	In any case, No duty of Conscription Examination and Enlist.	Same as above.
41 to 45	1.End of Mandatory Military service from Peacetime (Soldier ranks); 2.Extension of Mandatory Military service from Wartime	In any case, No duty of Conscription Examination and Enlist.	Exemption from Service for Active Soldiers, Reserve Soldiers, Supplementary Soldiers, Wartime Labor Service in Peacetime^{Note}
46 or older	End of Mandatory Military service from Peacetime and Wartime. Exemption from Service for Active, Reserve, Supplementary Soldiers, Wartime Labor Service in Peacetime and Wartime^{Note}		
Note: Retirement of Officers, Warrant officers, and Noncommissioned officers when they reach retirement age of rank.

== Determination criteria of physical grades ==
There are seven physical grades. Grade name is I, II, III, IV, V, VI and VII. Before 1984 grades name is A, B (respectively B-I, B-II, B-III), C, D and E

Before 1984		After 1984	
Name	Korean	Name	Korean
Grade A	갑종	Grade I	1급
Grade B-I	제1을종	Grade II	2급
Grade B-II	제2을종	Grade III	3급
Grade B-III	제3을종	Grade IV	4급
Grade C	병종	Grade V	5급
Grade D	정종	Grade VI	6급
Grade E	무종	Grade VII	7급

I, II, III and IV is Accepted, and grades V, VI and VII is Rejected.

The criteria for determining the physical grade shall be in accordance with Attached form 2 and 3 of the "Rules for examination of Conscription Physical Examination, etc.(병역판정 신체검사 등 검사규칙)" Attached form 2 sets the criteria for determining height and weight. Attached form 3 is the evaluation criteria for diseases and mental and physical disabilities, which vary from year to year.

In the following criteria, diseases and mental and physical disabilities are described mainly as representative or known.

Physical grade	Accepted or Rejected	Standards	Type of military service
I	Accepted	Physical and Psychological constitution is healthy, and can serve in active duty or supplementary service.	Active duty, Supplementary service, and Wartime labor service based on Qualifications (Educational background, Age, etc.)
II	Accepted	Physical and Psychological constitution is healthy, and can serve in active duty or supplementary service.	Active duty, Supplementary service, and Wartime labor service based on Qualifications (Educational background, Age, etc.)
III	Accepted	Physical and Psychological constitution is healthy, and can serve in active duty or supplementary service.	Active duty, Supplementary service, and Wartime labor service based on Qualifications (Educational background, Age, etc.)
IV	Accepted	Physical and Psychological constitution is healthy, and can serve in active duty or supplementary service.	Active duty, Supplementary service, and Wartime labor service based on Qualifications (Educational background, Age, etc.)
V	Rejected	Those incapable of entering active or supplementary service, but capable of entering the wartime labor service	Wartime labor service
VI	Rejected	Those incapable of performing military service due to disease or mental or physical disorder	Exempted from Military service
VII	Rejected	In the case where grades I, II, III, IV, V, VI cannot be received due to Disease or Mental and Physical disability	Subject to Rephysical examination

Physical grade	Height (centimeters), weight (BMI)	Disease or disabled
I	Height 161～203.9 cm：BMI20.0～24.9	A completely healthy person without illness or physical disability; Those in good condition after treatment of acute infectious diseases
II	Height 161～203.9 cm：BMI18.5～19.9・BMI25.0～29.9	Allergic rhinitis
III	Height 159～160 cm：BMI16.0～34.9; Height 161～203.9 cm：BMI16.0～18.4, BMI30.0～34.9	Hepatitis B carrier; Conservative treated or Operated Pneumothorax^{Note 1}; Mental disease; Minor, Mild Depression; Minor, Mild Obsessive-compulsive disorder; Several Developmental Disability (ADHD, Learning Disability)
IV	Height 146～158 cm; Height 159～203.9 cm: Below BMI16.0 and BMI35.0 or Over; Height 204 cm or Over	Case of endoscopic surgery with either Early gastric cancer, Early colorectal cancer, or Carcinoid; Prodrome of Skin malignant tumor(Giant acromegaly condyloma, Bowen disease), Basal cell carcinoma; Mental disease; Borderline intellectual functioning; Mild Autism Spectrum Disorder (High-functioning Autism, Asperger Syndrome, PDD-NOS without Intellectual Disability)
V	Height 140.1～145 cm	Mental disease; Schizophrenia; Gender dysphoria; Mild Intellectual Disability; Autism Spectrum Disorder without Intellectual Disability (High-functioning Autism, Asperger Syndrome, PDD-NOS without Intellectual Disability)
VI	Height 140 cm or Below	Malignant tumor (Cancer); Metastasized skin cancer; Bone cancer; HIV carrier; Hansen's Disease (Leprosy); Mental disease; Schizophrenia with Personality devastated; Moderate, Severe and Profound Intellectual Disability; Autism Spectrum Disorder with Intellectual Disability (Low-functioning autism, Childhood disintegrative disorder)
VII		
Note 1: Surgery due to pneumothorax is Grade V in 1992.

== Disposition for military service by educational background and physical grade ==
According to Article 14 of the Military Service Act, grades I to IV are based on qualifications (education, age, etc.) and are subject to active service, supplementary, wartime workers, Grade V exemptions, Grade VI exemptions, and Grade VII medical examinations. The criteria for disposing of active duty or supplementary officers in grades I to IV are determined by the Military Manpower Administration's announcement (annual announcement of conscription inspection). According to the announcement, the criteria for military service are as follows.

- Active duty (현역, Subject to Enlist for Active duty. Subject to Draft)
- Mix of active and supplementary
- Supplementary service (보충역)
- Wartime labor service (전시근로역)
- Exempted from Military service (병역면제)
- Subject to Physical Reexamination (재검사대상)

Disposition for military service by educational background and physical grade (after 2021)
Educational background	Physical grade						
Educational background	I	II	III	IV	V	VI	VII
Regardless	Active duty			Supplementary service	Wartime Labor Service	Exempted from Military service	Subject to Physical reexamination

=== 1950s to 1969 ===
Before the 1970s, the criteria for disposition of active duty and supplementary military service cannot be confirmed due to lack of data at the time.

==== in 1950 to 1955 ====
- 1950: It was the first year in the Republic of Korea that the Conscription was implemented. At that year, due to the limitation of 100,000 troops by the Korean military, the conscription system and Conscription Examination were suspended. However, in June of the same year, when the Korean War broke out, there was an unofficial conscription.
- 1952: As the Conscription system was Implemented again, Conscription Examination began again.

Educational background	Physical grade					
Educational background	A	B-I	B-II	C	D	E
Regardless	Accepted (Active duty, 1st Supplementary service, 2nd Supplementary service)			2nd Citizen service	Exempted from Military service	Subject to Physical reexamination

==== 1956 ====
Educational background	Physical grade				
Educational background	A	B-I	C	D	E
Regardless	Accepted (Active duty, 1st Supplementary military service, 2nd Supplementary military service)		2nd Citizen service	Exempted from Military service	Subject to Physical reexamination

==== 1957 ====
- The supplementary military service was abolished by the enforcement of the revised Military Service Act from August 1957.

Educational background	Physical grade					
Educational background	A	B-I	B-II	C	D	E
Regardless	Accepted (Active duty, 1st Supplementary military service, 2nd Supplementary military service)			2nd Citizen service	Exempted from Military service	Subject to Physical reexamination

==== 1958 to 1960 ====
- On 24 February 1958, there were Re-examination measures after canceling the judgment on 45,000 Grade C judges in the 1950 to 1957 Conscription examination.

Educational background	Physical grade						
Educational background	A	B-I	B-II	B-III	C	D	E
Regardless	Accepted (Active duty)				2nd Citizen service	Exempted from Military service	Subject to Physical reexamination

==== 1961 ====
- There was a physical examination of public officials who were judged to be Grade C.
- In 1961, there was a physical examination of 128,422 embroidered persons who reported between 21 June and 30 June, which was set as the period for reporting embroidery of those who failed to serve in the military.

Educational background	Physical grade					
Educational background	A	B-I	B-II	C	D	E
Regardless	Accepted (Active duty)			2nd Citizen service	Exempted from Military service	Subject to Physical reexamination

==== 1962 ====
- Those born on or after 1 January 1930, who have been punished for active service under the Military Service Act enacted before 1 October 1962, and who have not joined the army, will be transferred to the 1st supplementary role and will be supplemented. (Except for those who joined the National Land Construction Team(국토건설단) in 1961.)

Educational background	Physical grade								
Educational background	A	B-I	B-II	B-III	B-IV	B-V	C	D	E
Regardless	Accepted (Active duty) (After Oct, 1st 1962, Active duty, 1st Supplementary service, 2nd Supplementary service)						2nd Citizen service	Exempted from Military service	Subject to Physical reexamination

==== 1963 to 1969 ====
- Among those who were examined for conscription in 1962, those who were judged to be Grade B4 and B5 were transferred to Grade C and converted to 2nd Citizen service.

Educational background	Physical grade						
Educational background	A	B-I	B-II	B-III	C	D	E
Regardless	Accepted (Active duty, 1st Supplementary service, 2nd Supplementary service)				2nd Citizen service	Exempted from Military service	Subject to Physical reexamination

=== After 1970s ===
==== 1970 ====
Educational background	Physical grade						
Educational background	A	B-I	B-II	B-III	C	D	E
College attending or more	Active duty			Supplementary service	2nd Citizen service	Exempted from Military service	Subject to Physical reexamination
High school Graduated	Active duty			Supplementary service	2nd Citizen service	Exempted from Military service	Subject to Physical reexamination
High school Dropout	Active duty			Supplementary service	2nd Citizen service	Exempted from Military service	Subject to Physical reexamination
Middle school Graduated	Active duty			Supplementary service	2nd Citizen service	Exempted from Military service	Subject to Physical reexamination
Middle school Dropout	Active duty			Supplementary service	2nd Citizen service	Exempted from Military service	Subject to Physical reexamination
Elementary school Graduated	Active duty			Supplementary service	2nd Citizen service	Exempted from Military service	Subject to Physical reexamination
Elementary school Dropout or less	Active duty	Supplementary service			2nd Citizen service	Exempted from Military service	Subject to Physical reexamination

==== 1971 ====
Educational background	Physical grade						
Educational background	A	B-I	B-II	B-III	C	D	E
College attending or more	Active duty			Supplementary service	2nd Citizen service	Exempted from Military service	Subject to Physical reexamination
High school Graduated	Active duty			Supplementary service	2nd Citizen service	Exempted from Military service	Subject to Physical reexamination
High school Dropout	Active duty			Supplementary service	2nd Citizen service	Exempted from Military service	Subject to Physical reexamination
Middle school Graduated	Active duty			Supplementary service	2nd Citizen service	Exempted from Military service	Subject to Physical reexamination
Middle school Dropout	Active duty		Supplementary service		2nd Citizen service	Exempted from Military service	Subject to Physical reexamination
Elementary school Graduated	Active duty		Supplementary service		2nd Citizen service	Exempted from Military service	Subject to Physical reexamination
Elementary school Dropout or less	Active duty	Supplementary service			2nd Citizen service	Exempted from Military service	Subject to Physical reexamination

==== 1972 ====
Educational background	Physical grade						
Educational background	A	B-I	B-II	B-III	C	D	E
College attending or more	Active duty			Supplementary service	2nd Citizen service	Exempted from Military service	Subject to Physical reexamination
High school Graduated	Active duty			Supplementary service	2nd Citizen service	Exempted from Military service	Subject to Physical reexamination
High school Dropout	Active duty			Supplementary service	2nd Citizen service	Exempted from Military service	Subject to Physical reexamination
Middle school Graduated	Active duty			Supplementary service	2nd Citizen service	Exempted from Military service	Subject to Physical reexamination
Middle school Dropout	Active duty			Supplementary service	2nd Citizen service	Exempted from Military service	Subject to Physical reexamination
Elementary school Graduated	Active duty			Supplementary service	2nd Citizen service	Exempted from Military service	Subject to Physical reexamination
Elementary school Dropout or less	Active duty	Supplementary service			2nd Citizen service	Exempted from Military service	Subject to Physical reexamination

==== 1973 ====
- Middle school Graduated or more
  - Grade A, B-I, B-II: Active duty
  - Grade B-III: Supplementary service
- Elementary school Graduated or more, Middle school Dropout or less
  - Grade A: Active duty
  - Grade B-I, B-II, B-III: Supplementary service
- Elementary school Dropout or less: 2nd Citizen service

Educational background	Physical grade						
Educational background	A	B-I	B-II	B-III	C	D	E
College attending or more	Active duty			Supplementary service	2nd Citizen service	Exempted from Military service	Subject to Physical reexamination
High school Graduated	Active duty			Supplementary service	2nd Citizen service	Exempted from Military service	Subject to Physical reexamination
High school Dropout	Active duty			Supplementary service	2nd Citizen service	Exempted from Military service	Subject to Physical reexamination
Middle school Graduated	Active duty			Supplementary service	2nd Citizen service	Exempted from Military service	Subject to Physical reexamination
Middle school Dropout	Active duty	Supplementary service			2nd Citizen service	Exempted from Military service	Subject to Physical reexamination
Elementary school Graduated	Active duty	Supplementary service			2nd Citizen service	Exempted from Military service	Subject to Physical reexamination
Elementary school Dropout or less	2nd Citizen service				2nd Citizen service	Exempted from Military service	Subject to Physical reexamination

==== 1974 to 1976 ====
- College attending or more
  - Grade A, B-I, B-II: Active duty
  - Grade B-III: Supplementary service
- Middle school Graduated or more, High school Dropout or less
  - Grade A, B-I: Active duty
  - Grade B-II, B-III: Supplementary service
- Elementary school Graduated or more, Middle school Dropout or less
  - Grade A: Active duty
  - Grade B-I, B-II, B-III: Supplementary service

Educational background	Physical grade						
Educational background	A	B-I	B-II	B-III	C	D	E
College attending or more	Active duty			Supplementary service	2nd Citizen service	Exempted from Military service	Subject to Physical reexamination
High school Graduated	Active duty		Supplementary service		2nd Citizen service	Exempted from Military service	Subject to Physical reexamination
High school Graduated	Active duty		Supplementary service		2nd Citizen service	Exempted from Military service	Subject to Physical reexamination
Middle school Graduated	Active duty		Supplementary service		2nd Citizen service	Exempted from Military service	Subject to Physical reexamination
Middle school Dropout	Active duty	Supplementary service			2nd Citizen service	Exempted from Military service	Subject to Physical reexamination
Elementary school Graduated	Active duty	Supplementary service			2nd Citizen service	Exempted from Military service	Subject to Physical reexamination
Elementary school Dropout or less	2nd Citizen service				2nd Citizen service	Exempted from Military service	Subject to Physical reexamination

==== 1977 to 1979 ====
- College attending or more
  - Grade A, B-I, B-II, B-III: Active duty
- High school Graduated or less
  - Grade A, B-I: Active duty
  - Grade B-II, B-III: Supplementary service
- Middle school Dropout or less: 2nd Citizen service

Educational background	Physical grade						
Educational background	A	B-I	B-II	B-III	C	D	E
College attending or more	Active duty				2nd Citizen service	Exempted from Military service	Subject to Physical reexamination
High school Graduated	Active duty		Supplementary service		2nd Citizen service	Exempted from Military service	Subject to Physical reexamination
High school Dropout	Active duty		Supplementary service		2nd Citizen service	Exempted from Military service	Subject to Physical reexamination
Middle school Graduated	Active duty		Supplementary service		2nd Citizen service	Exempted from Military service	Subject to Physical reexamination
Middle school Dropout or less	2nd Citizen service				2nd Citizen service	Exempted from Military service	Subject to Physical reexamination

==== 1980 to 1983 ====
- College attending or more
  - Grade A, B-I, B-II: Active duty
  - Grade B-III: Supplementary service
- High school Graduated or less
  - Grade A: Active duty
  - Grade B-I, II, III: Supplementary service

Educational background	Physical grade						
Educational background	A	B-I	B-II	B-III	C	D	E
College attending or more	Active duty			Supplementary service	2nd Citizen service	Exempted from Military service	Subject to Physical reexamination
High school Graduated	Active duty	Supplementary service		Supplementary service	2nd Citizen service	Exempted from Military service	Subject to Physical reexamination
High school Dropout	Active duty	Supplementary service		Supplementary service	2nd Citizen service	Exempted from Military service	Subject to Physical reexamination
Middle school Graduated	Active duty	Supplementary service		Supplementary service	2nd Citizen service	Exempted from Military service	Subject to Physical reexamination
Middle school Dropout or less	2nd Citizen service				2nd Citizen service	Exempted from Military service	Subject to Physical reexamination

==== 1984 ====
In 1984, Change of Physical Grade Name.
Before 1984		After 1984	
Name	Korean	Name	Korean
A	갑종	I	1급
B-I	제1을종	II	2급
B-II	제2을종	III	3급
B-III	제3을종	IV	4급
C	병종	V	5급
D	정종	VI	6급
E	무종	VII	7급

- College attending or more
  - Grade I, II, III: Active duty
  - Grade IV: Supplementary service
- High school Graduated
  - Grade I, II: Active duty
  - Grade III, IV: Supplementary service
- High school Dropout or less
  - Grade I: Active duty
  - Grade II, III, IV: Supplementary service

Educational background	Physical grade						
Educational background	I	II	III	IV	V	VI	VII
College attending or more	Active duty			Supplementary service	2nd Citizen service	Exempted from Military service	Subject to Physical reexamination
High school Graduated	Active duty		Supplementary service	Supplementary service	2nd Citizen service	Exempted from Military service	Subject to Physical reexamination
High school Dropout	Active duty	Supplementary service		Supplementary service	2nd Citizen service	Exempted from Military service	Subject to Physical reexamination
Middle school Graduated	Active duty	Supplementary service		Supplementary service	2nd Citizen service	Exempted from Military service	Subject to Physical reexamination
Middle school Dropout or less	2nd Citizen service				2nd Citizen service	Exempted from Military service	Subject to Physical reexamination

==== 1985 ====
Educational background	Physical grade						
Educational background	I	II	III	IV	V	VI	VII
College attending or more	Active duty			Supplementary service	2nd Citizen service	Exempted from Military service	Subject to Physical reexamination
High school Graduated	Active duty			Supplementary service	2nd Citizen service	Exempted from Military service	Subject to Physical reexamination
High school Dropout	Active duty			Supplementary service	2nd Citizen service	Exempted from Military service	Subject to Physical reexamination
Middle school Graduated	Active duty		Supplementary service	Supplementary service	2nd Citizen service	Exempted from Military service	Subject to Physical reexamination
Middle school Dropout or less	2nd Citizen service				2nd Citizen service	Exempted from Military service	Subject to Physical reexamination

==== 1986 ====
Educational background	Physical grade						
Educational background	I	II	III	IV	V	VI	VII
College attending or more	Active duty			Supplementary service	2nd Citizen service	Exempted from Military service	Subject to Physical reexamination
High school Graduated	Active duty			Supplementary service	2nd Citizen service	Exempted from Military service	Subject to Physical reexamination
High school Dropout	Active duty			Supplementary service	2nd Citizen service	Exempted from Military service	Subject to Physical reexamination
Middle school Graduated	Active duty	Supplementary service		Supplementary service	2nd Citizen service	Exempted from Military service	Subject to Physical reexamination
Middle school Dropout or less	2nd Citizen service				2nd Citizen service	Exempted from Military service	Subject to Physical reexamination

==== 1987 ====
- High school Graduated or more
  - Grade I, II: Active duty
  - Grade III, IV: Supplementary service
- High school Dropout or less
  - Grade I: Active duty
  - Grade II, III, IV: Supplementary service

Educational background	Physical grade						
Educational background	I	II	III	IV	V	VI	VII
College attending or more	Active duty		Supplementary service		2nd Citizen service	Exempted from Military service	Subject to Physical reexamination
High school Graduated	Active duty		Supplementary service		2nd Citizen service	Exempted from Military service	Subject to Physical reexamination
High school Dropout	Active duty	Supplementary service			2nd Citizen service	Exempted from Military service	Subject to Physical reexamination
Middle school Graduated	Active duty	Supplementary service			2nd Citizen service	Exempted from Military service	Subject to Physical reexamination
Middle school Dropout or less	2nd Citizen service				2nd Citizen service	Exempted from Military service	Subject to Physical reexamination

==== 1988 to 1991 ====
- 1988: Skipped Conscription Examination of Elementary school Graduated or less
- 1989: Those aged 25 or older among those graduating from High school will be converted to Supplementary service.
- 1 June 1991: High school graduates who are 162 centimeters or less, high school graduates and those who are above university students, and who are Grade II (and III, IV) due to myopia of ophthalmology, will be converted to Supplementary service. (A person who was Conscription examined from 1990)
- 15 November 1991: Those who graduated from high school and a Physical grade II will be converted to Supplementary service. (A person who was Conscription examined from 1991)
- 1 January 1992: Middle school Dropout or less is Supplementary service. (Exemption from Call of Bangwi)

Educational background	Physical grade						
Educational background	I	II	III	IV	V	VI	VII
College attending or more	Active duty		Supplementary service		2nd Citizen service	Exempted from Military service	Subject to Physical reexamination
High school Graduated	Active duty		Supplementary service		2nd Citizen service	Exempted from Military service	Subject to Physical reexamination
High school Dropout	Supplementary service				2nd Citizen service	Exempted from Military service	Subject to Physical reexamination
Middle school Graduated	Supplementary service				2nd Citizen service	Exempted from Military service	Subject to Physical reexamination
Middle school Dropout or less	2nd Citizen service				2nd Citizen service	Exempted from Military service	Subject to Physical reexamination

==== 1992 ====
- Middle school Graduated or more, Physical grade I, II, III, IV: Active duty. But, on 30 October of the same year, it was changed as follows:
  - High school Graduated or more, Physical grade III, IV: converted to Supplementary service
  - High school Dropout or less, Physical grade I, II, III, IV: converted to Supplementary service

Educational background	Physical grade						
Educational background	I	II	III	IV	V	VI	VII
College attending or more	Active duty				2nd Citizen service	Exempted from Military service	Subject to Physical reexamination
High school Graduated	Active duty				2nd Citizen service	Exempted from Military service	Subject to Physical reexamination
High school Dropout	Active duty				2nd Citizen service	Exempted from Military service	Subject to Physical reexamination
Middle school Graduated	Active duty				2nd Citizen service	Exempted from Military service	Subject to Physical reexamination
Middle school Dropout or less	2nd Citizen service				2nd Citizen service	Exempted from Military service	Subject to Physical reexamination

==== 1993 ====
- High school Graduated or more
  - Grade I, II, III: Active duty
  - Grade IV: Supplementary service
- High school Dropout and Middle school Graduated with Grade I, II, III, IV: Supplementary service

Educational background	Physical grade						
Educational background	I	II	III	IV	V	VI	VII
College attending or more	Active duty			Supplementary service	2nd Citizen service	Exempted from Military service	Subject to Physical reexamination
High school Graduated	Active duty			Supplementary service	2nd Citizen service	Exempted from Military service	Subject to Physical reexamination
High school Dropout	Supplementary service			Supplementary service	2nd Citizen service	Exempted from Military service	Subject to Physical reexamination
Middle school Graduated	Supplementary service			Supplementary service	2nd Citizen service	Exempted from Military service	Subject to Physical reexamination
Middle school Dropout or less	2nd Citizen service				2nd Citizen service	Exempted from Military service	Subject to Physical reexamination

==== 1994 ====
- High school Graduated or more with Grade I, II, III, IV: Active duty
- High school Dropout
  - Grade I: Active duty
  - Grade II, III, IV: Supplementary service
- Middle school Graduated with Grade I, II, III, IV: Supplementary service

Educational background	Physical grade						
Educational background	I	II	III	IV	V	VI	VII
College attending or more	Active duty				2nd Citizen service	Exempted from Military service	Subject to Physical reexamination
High school Graduated	Active duty				2nd Citizen service	Exempted from Military service	Subject to Physical reexamination
High school Dropout	Active duty	Supplementary service			2nd Citizen service	Exempted from Military service	Subject to Physical reexamination
Middle school Graduated	Supplementary service				2nd Citizen service	Exempted from Military service	Subject to Physical reexamination
Middle school Dropout or less	2nd Citizen service				2nd Citizen service	Exempted from Military service	Subject to Physical reexamination

==== 1995 to 1996 ====
- High school Graduated or more
  - Grade I, II, III: Active duty
  - Grade IV: Supplementary service
- Those who graduated from middle school and a Physical grade I, II, III, IV will be converted to Supplementary service from 1996

Educational background	Physical grade						
Educational background	I	II	III	IV	V	VI	VII
College attending or more	Active duty			Supplementary service	2nd Citizen service	Exempted from Military service	Subject to Physical reexamination
High school Graduated	Active duty			Supplementary service	2nd Citizen service	Exempted from Military service	Subject to Physical reexamination
High school Dropout	Active duty			Supplementary service	2nd Citizen service	Exempted from Military service	Subject to Physical reexamination
Middle school Graduated	Active duty			Supplementary service	2nd Citizen service	Exempted from Military service	Subject to Physical reexamination
Middle school Dropout or less	2nd Citizen service				2nd Citizen service	Exempted from Military service	Subject to Physical reexamination

==== 1997 ====
- High school Dropout or more
  - Grade I, II, III: Active duty
  - Grade IV: Supplementary service
- Middle school Graduated
  - Grade I, II, III, IV: Supplementary service
- High school Dropout with Physical grade III: converted to Supplementary service from 2 June 1997
- High school Dropout with Physical grade II: converted to Supplementary service from 1 January 1998

Educational background	Physical grade						
Educational background	I	II	III	IV	V	VI	VII
College attending or more	Active duty			Supplementary service	2nd Citizen service	Exempted from Military service	Subject to Physical reexamination
High school Graduated	Active duty			Supplementary service	2nd Citizen service	Exempted from Military service	Subject to Physical reexamination
High school Dropout	Active duty			Supplementary service	2nd Citizen service	Exempted from Military service	Subject to Physical reexamination
Middle school Graduated	Supplementary service			Supplementary service	2nd Citizen service	Exempted from Military service	Subject to Physical reexamination
Middle school Dropout or less	2nd Citizen service				2nd Citizen service	Exempted from Military service	Subject to Physical reexamination

==== 1998 to 2003 ====
- High school Graduated or more
  - Grade I, II, III: Active duty
  - Grade IV: Supplementary service
- Middle school Graduated, High school Dropout
  - Grade I, II, III, IV: Supplementary service
- 1999 to 2011
- Skipped Conscription Examination with Transferred the 2nd Citizen service of Middle school Dropout or less in 1999 to 2011

Educational background	Physical grade						
Educational background	I	II	III	IV	V	VI	VII
College attending or more	Active duty			Supplementary service	2nd Citizen service	Exempted from Military service	Subject to Physical reexamination
High school Graduated	Active duty			Supplementary service	2nd Citizen service	Exempted from Military service	Subject to Physical reexamination
High school Dropout	Supplementary service			Supplementary service	2nd Citizen service	Exempted from Military service	Subject to Physical reexamination
Middle school Graduated	Supplementary service			Supplementary service	2nd Citizen service	Exempted from Military service	Subject to Physical reexamination
Middle school Dropout or less	2nd Citizen service				2nd Citizen service	Exempted from Military service	Subject to Physical reexamination

==== 2004 ====
- Middle school Graduated or more
  - Grade I, II, III: Active duty
  - Grade IV: Supplementary service

Educational background	Physical grade						
Educational background	I	II	III	IV	V	VI	VII
College attending or more	Active duty			Supplementary service	2nd Citizen service	Exempted from Military service	Subject to Physical reexamination
High school Graduated	Active duty			Supplementary service	2nd Citizen service	Exempted from Military service	Subject to Physical reexamination
High school Dropout	Active duty			Supplementary service	2nd Citizen service	Exempted from Military service	Subject to Physical reexamination
Middle school Graduated	Active duty			Supplementary service	2nd Citizen service	Exempted from Military service	Subject to Physical reexamination
Middle school Dropout or less	2nd Citizen service				2nd Citizen service	Exempted from Military service	Subject to Physical reexamination

==== 2005 ====
- College attending or more with Grade I, II, III, IV: Active duty
- Middle school Graduated and High school Dropout
  - Grade I, II, III: Active duty
  - Grade IV: Supplementary service

Educational background	Physical grade						
Educational background	I	II	III	IV	V	VI	VII
College attending or more	Active duty				2nd Citizen service	Exempted from Military service	Subject to Physical reexamination
High school Graduated	Active duty			Supplementary service	2nd Citizen service	Exempted from Military service	Subject to Physical reexamination
High school Dropout	Active duty			Supplementary service	2nd Citizen service	Exempted from Military service	Subject to Physical reexamination
Middle school Graduated	Active duty			Supplementary service	2nd Citizen service	Exempted from Military service	Subject to Physical reexamination
Middle school Dropout or less	2nd Citizen service				2nd Citizen service	Exempted from Military service	Subject to Physical reexamination

==== 2006 to 2011 ====
- Middle school Graduated or more
  - Grade I, II, III: Active duty
  - Grade IV: Supplementary service

Educational background	Physical grade						
Educational background	I	II	III	IV	V	VI	VII
College attending or more	Active duty			Supplementary service	2nd Citizen service	Exempted from Military service	Subject to Physical reexamination
High school Graduated	Active duty			Supplementary service	2nd Citizen service	Exempted from Military service	Subject to Physical reexamination
High school Dropout	Active duty			Supplementary service	2nd Citizen service	Exempted from Military service	Subject to Physical reexamination
Middle school Graduated	Active duty			Supplementary service	2nd Citizen service	Exempted from Military service	Subject to Physical reexamination
Middle school Dropout or less	2nd Citizen service				2nd Citizen service	Exempted from Military service	Subject to Physical reexamination

==== 2012 to 1st half of 2015 ====
- Middle school Graduated or more
  - Grade I, II, III: Active duty
  - Grade IV: Supplementary service
- Middle school Dropout or less with Physical Grade I, II, III, IV: Supplementary service

Educational background	Physical grade						
Educational background	I	II	III	IV	V	VI	VII
College attending or more	Active duty			Supplementary service	2nd Citizen service	Exempted from Military service	Subject to Physical reexamination
High school Graduated	Active duty			Supplementary service	2nd Citizen service	Exempted from Military service	Subject to Physical reexamination
High school Dropout	Active duty			Supplementary service	2nd Citizen service	Exempted from Military service	Subject to Physical reexamination
Middle school Graduated	Active duty			Supplementary service	2nd Citizen service	Exempted from Military service	Subject to Physical reexamination
Middle school Dropout or less	Supplementary service				2nd Citizen service	Exempted from Military service	Subject to Physical reexamination

External links

- (in Korean) Public Notice of Draft examination in 2014(Military Manpower Administration Public Notice No. 2014-2)

==== 2nd half of 2015 to 2020 ====
- High school Graduated or more
  - Grade I, II and III: Active duty
  - Grade IV: Supplementary service
- High school Dropout of less with Physical grade I, II, III, IV: Supplementary service

Educational background	Physical grade						
Educational background	I	II	III	IV	V	VI	VII
College attending or more	Active duty			Supplementary service	Wartime Labor Service	Exempted from Military service	Subject to Physical reexamination
High school Graduated	Active duty			Supplementary service	Wartime Labor Service	Exempted from Military service	Subject to Physical reexamination
High school Dropout or less	Supplementary service				Wartime Labor Service	Exempted from Military service	Subject to Physical reexamination

External links

- (Korean) Public Notice of Draft examination in 2016(Military Manpower Administration Public Notice No. 2016-3)
- (Korean) Public Notice of Draft examination in 2017(Military Manpower Administration Public Notice No. 2017-1)
- (Korean) Public Notice of Draft examination in 2018(Military Manpower Administration Public Notice No. 2018-1)
- (Korean) Public Notice of Draft examination in 2019(Military Manpower Administration Public Notice No. 2019-1)
- (Korean) Public Notice of Draft examination in 2020(Military Manpower Administration Public Notice No. 2020-1)

== Salary and benefits ==
Salary per month in 2017

Private (이등병)	Private first class (일등병)	Corporal (상등병)	Sergeant (병장)
₩163,000	₩176,400	₩195,500	₩216,000

Salary per month in 2018

Private (이등병)	Private first class (일등병)	Corporal (상등병)	Sergeant (병장)
₩306,100	₩331,300	₩366,200	₩405,700

Salary per month in 2019

Private (이등병)	Private first class (일등병)	Corporal (상등병)	Sergeant (병장)
₩306,100	₩331,300	₩366,200	₩405,700

Salary per month in 2020

Private (이등병)	Private first class (일등병)	Corporal (상등병)	Sergeant (병장)
₩408,100	₩441,700	₩488,200	₩540,900

Salary per month in 2021

Private (이등병)	Private first class (일등병)	Corporal (상등병)	Sergeant (병장)
₩459,100	₩496,900	₩549,200	₩608,500

Salary per month in 2022

Private (이등병)	Private first class (일등병)	Corporal (상등병)	Sergeant (병장)
₩510,100	₩552,100	₩610,200	₩676,100

Salary per month in 2023

Private (이등병)	Private first class (일등병)	Corporal (상등병)	Sergeant (병장)
₩600,000	₩680,000	₩800,000	₩1,000,000

== See also ==
- Forced Labour Convention
- Supplementary service in South Korea
  - Social service agent
- Conscription in North Korea
