= Replenishment military service =

Replenishment military service Replacement military service Replacement service Supplementary service

Chinese name
- Traditional Chinese: 补充兵役
- Simplified Chinese: 補充兵役
Transcriptions
Standard Mandarin
- Hanyu Pinyin: bu'chong bing'yi

Korean name
- Hangul: 보충병역, 보충역
- Hanja: 補充兵役, 補充役
Transcriptions
- Revised Romanization: Bochung Byeongyeok, Bochungyeok
- McCune–Reischauer: Pochung Byongyŏk, Pochungyŏk

Japanese name
- Kanji: 補充兵役
- Hiragana: ほじゅうへいえき
Transcriptions
- Romanization: Hojû Heieki

Replenishment soldier Replacement soldier Supplementary soldier

Chinese name
- Traditional Chinese: 补充兵
- Simplified Chinese: 補充兵
Transcriptions
Standard Mandarin
- Hanyu Pinyin: bu'chong bing

Korean name
- Hangul: 보충병
- Hanja: 補充兵
Transcriptions
- Revised Romanization: Bochung Byeong
- McCune–Reischauer: Pochung Byong

Japanese name
- Kanji: 補充兵
- Hiragana: ほじゅうへい
Transcriptions
- Romanization: Hojû Hei

Replenishment military service (Chinese: 補充兵役) is a type of military service to make up for vacancies in active service. This type of military service can be found in the military service systems of several East-Asian countries. It is also translated as "Replacement service" (Republic of China) or "Supplementary service" (Republic of Korea). Those who belong to it are "Replenishment soldiers", "Replacement soldiers" or "Supplementary soldiers"

== Countries ==
=== Japan (before 1945) ===
In Japan, there was a provision related to Replenishment soldiers (補充兵, hoju hei) in the conscription office ordinance (徵兵事務條例, Chōhei jimu jōrei) enacted in 1879. This provision consisted of Articles 125 to 130.

When the Military Service Act was enacted in place of the Conscription ordinance, it was written as hoju hei-eki (replenishment territorial army and naval volunteer reserve. a literal translation: Replenishment military service.)

=== Republic of China (Taiwan) ===
In 1946, the Republic of China revised the Military Service Act, creating the concept of supplementary military service. It was divided into supplementary military service in active service and supplementary military service in reserve.

Act of Military Service System of Republic of China(Amended and promulgated by Nationalist Government on October 10, 1946.)
Original language	English translation
第八條 補充兵役分左列二種： 一、現役：凡適合常備兵役之超額男子，視國防需要，每年徵集一部入營，由常備師或管區施以四個月至六個月之訓練，期滿退伍。 二、預備役：以補充兵現役期滿退伍者充之，至屆滿四十五歲止除役。	Article 8 Replacement military service is divided into two categories as shown on the left:: 1.Active Service: Each year, one male soldier who is eligible for standing military service shall be recruited for enlistment, and shall be discharged from the army after four to six months of training by the standing division or district. 2.Reserve Service: Those discharged from active service after the expiration of the complementary service shall be discharged at the age of 45.
第十一條 補充兵在戰時依戰事需要，得依年次召集，參加作戰，並得臨時施以加強教育。	Article 11 Replacement soldiers shall be convened annually as necessary for wartime, participate in operations, and temporarily provide strengthen education.

=== Republic of Korea (South Korea) ===
The Military Service Act was enacted in 1949. South Korea began to operate a Supplementary military service(보충병역), divided into the 1st supplementary military service(제1보충병역) and the 2nd supplementary military service.(제2보충병역)

Supplementry military service was abolished by the revision of the Military Service Act in 1957, and those who were supplementary soldiers at the time were incorporated into the 1st reserve and the 2nd militia service according to their age. From 1962, the Supplementary service system was re-established with the enactment of the 1st Supplementary service and the 2nd Supplementary service.

In 1962, a call of defense was established after the establishment of the Bangwibyeong (ko:방위병). in 1969, they were called to serve as Bangwibyeong. In 1971, the 1st supplementary service and 2nd supplementary service were abolished and became supplementary service.

In 1973, Supplementary service requiring specific qualifications was established. In the late 1960s and early 1970s, supplementary services in South Korea began to operate in the form of alternative services that required military training.

In 1995, after the abolition of the call of defense, Social service personnel (ko:사회복무요원) were classified as supplementary services, and supplementary services after 1995 meant alternative service in the private sector after mandatory military training.

== See also ==
- Conscription
