= Bangwibyeong =

1969–1994 South Korean conscription system

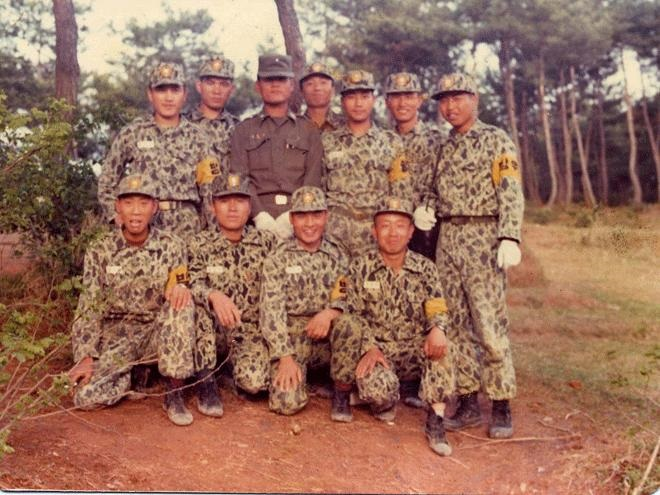
- Group photo of Bangwibyeong(Around 1970's to Early 1980's)

Korean name
- Hangul: 방위병
- Hanja: 防衛兵
- RR: bangwibyeong
- MR: pangwibyŏng

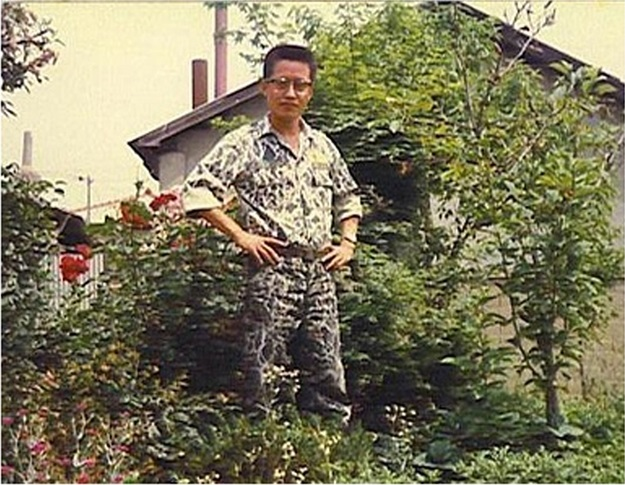
In 1981, Hong Jun-pyo in Bangwibyeong service. He is Bangwibyeong served from Army Coast guard post in Buan, Jeollabuk-do.

The Bangwibyeong (Korean: 방위병; lit. Defence soldier) is a system under the Conscription in South Korea that existed from 1969 to 1994.

The Defense call-up system, which means being called up to Bangwibyeong, was abolished in 1995 with the creation of the Full-Time Reserve Service and Social Service Personnel.

Those who were called up were those who served in supplementary military service, and Subject to Call-up of Bangwibyeong varied by year.

== History ==
- April, 1969: Ministry of the Interior, Implementation of the Bangwibyeong and Defence call-up System.
- July, 1971: Management authority over Bangwibyeong and Defence call-up system is transferred from the Ministry of Interior to Ministry of National Defense
- February, 1973: Applying Military Criminal Act to Bangwibyeong
- December 31, 1994: Abolished the Bangwibyeong and Bangwi call-up System. Implemented the Next day (January 1, 1995) the Social service personnel system.

== Terms ==
=== General terms ===
- Subject to Defence call (방위소집대상; 防衛召集對象, bangwi sojip daesang): It means the Subject to defense call.
- Defence call (방위소집; 防衛召集, bangwi sojip): It means that the person Subject to the Defense call is called up.
- a person called in for Defense (방위소집된 자, bangwi sojipdoen ja)): It refers to a person who is called up to serve by a defense call, and is often called Bangwibyeong.

=== Informal terms or Slang terms ===
- Ddongbangwi (똥방위): A slang for Bangwibyeong serve in the Conscription part in Dong office
- Songchubangwi (송추방위): Among the Bangwibyeongs who performed the duties of combatments, the nickname refers to Bangwibyeong, who served in units around the area called Songchu of Yangju-gun, Gyeonggi-do.
- Jottobangwi (조또방위)
- Weolnambangwi (월남방위; lit. Vietnam defense)
- Weolnam Skibudae (월남 스키부대; lit. Vietnam ski unit)

== Identity ==
Bangwibyeong is a soldier, Service status was a Supplementary service.

== Call-up and service ==
When a person subject to Defense call receives a call-up notice, called to 3 or 4 weeks of military training from boot camp. After completing military training, deployed to Service institutions.

In this way, it is called a Bangwibyeong to be called up to serve by a Defense call.

Bangwibyeong's Service institutions is Military unit, Police Station, Reserve armory, Reserve force company, Conscription part in City hall, County office, District office or Town office. Bangwibyeong performed the following duties during their service;

- Performing of Combatants or Noncombatants: Army, Navy and Air Force units, Police station, Reserve force armory, Reserve force company
- Performing of Conscription administrative assistance: Conscription part in City hall, County office, District office, Dong office, Town office or Township office

Bangwibyeong was basically a form of commuting from home to Service institutions. Bangwibyeong in charge of combatment were sometimes required to stay in barracks during the training period of the troops while commuting from home to military unit.

== Service period ==
Under the Military Service Act, the service period of a Bangwibyeong was called, The period was within 2 to 3 years. However, the actual length of service was as follows;

- Ordinary Bangwibyeong
  - 1969 to 1981: 1 year(Time service period system from 1969 to 1974, One-day service period system from 1974 to 1982. 2920 hours, 365 days)
  - 1982 to 1986: 1 year 2 months
  - 1986 to abolited year: 1 year 6 months
- Only son Bangwibyeong. Only son is only son whose father died first, 2nd generation Only son, Only son whose parents are 60 or over years old.
  - Before 1992: 6 months
  - After 1993(Born after January 1, 1974. Those born Only son before December 31, 1973, are the same as those Only son Bangwibyeong service period before 1992): Same as the Ordinary Bangwibyeong's service period.

== Comparisons ==
Sortation	Active duty	full-time reserve	Supplementary service (Social Service Personnel etc.)	Bangwibyeong
Duty	active duty, reservist (after duty)	active duty only for basic military training, after that, remaining duty is served as a reservist	basic military education and discharge from military service as reservist (same for the reserve forces after that)	
Identity	soldier	soldier	citizen	soldier
Duty period	Army and Marine 1 Year 9 Months, Navy 1 Year 11 Months, Air Force 2 Years	Army, Marine, Navy, all 1 year and 9 months.	1 year and 10 months on Social Service Personnel	Dependent on year.
Rank after duty	sergeant	sergeant	private	corporal
Form of duty	barracks life	commute to work and leave from home every day (weekends usually rest)	commute to work and leave from home every day or camp (two days of vacation per week)	commute to work and leave from home every day (weekends usually rest)
Relative height	-	effective January 1, 1995.	effective January 1, 1995.	effective April, 1969. abolished on December 31, 1994.

== See also ==
- Supplementary service in South Korea
- Social service agent
