= Asian Junior Volleyball Championship =

Asian Junior Volleyball Championship may refer to:

== Boys/Men ==
- Asian Boys' U16 Volleyball Championship
- Asian Boys' U18 Volleyball Championship
- Asian Men's U20 Volleyball Championship

== Girls/Women ==
- Asian Girls' U16 Volleyball Championship, an Asian Volleyball Confederation competition
- Asian Girls' U18 Volleyball Championship
- Asian Women's U20 Volleyball Championship
