= Conscription in North Korea =

Countries with ongoing conscription

Conscription in North Korea occurs despite ambiguity concerning its legal status. Men are universally conscripted while women undergo selective conscription. Conscription takes place at age 17 and service ends at 30. Children of the political elites are exempt from conscription, as are people with bad songbun (ascribed social status in North Korea). Recruitment is done on the basis of annual targets drawn up by the Central Military Commission of the Workers' Party of Korea and implemented locally by schools. Conscription first began before the Korean War.

== Background ==
North Korea is considered the world's most militarized society in modern times. As many as one in three North Koreans may be a member of one of the many military organizations at any given moment.

== History ==
Conscription in North Korea began before the Korean War. The draft helped to rapidly grow the size of the Korean People's Army (KPA) before the war broke out in 1950.

In 1993, conscription was extended from eight to ten years.

== Legal status ==
In 1958, North Korea adopted Cabinet Decision number 148 to define service of conscripts as three and a half years in the army and four years in the navy. In 1993, service was expanded to ten years on the orders of Kim Jong Il. In 1996, conscription was further extended and conscripts will now have to serve until they are aged 30. According to some sources, conscription was codified in a law adopted by the 10th Supreme People's Assembly in 2003.

In 2003, North Korea claimed to the UN Committee on the Rights of the Child that all military enlistment in the country is on a voluntary basis.

Annual target quotas for conscription are set by the Central Military Commission of the Workers' Party of Korea and, before the Constitution was amended in 2016, the National Defence Commission of the Democratic People's Republic of Korea. These orders are then implemented by local officials on the provincial, municipal, and county levels. The county level delegates the task of levying recruits to local schools.

Although the legal status of conscription in North Korea is not entirely clear, the country de facto maintains a system of conscription.

== In practice ==
=== Drafting ===
All men over the age of 17 effectively have to enlist in the KPA. They have to partake in constant enlistment rallies during which it is nearly impossible to refuse service.

Young men are enthusiastic about enlisting because it protects them from the stigma attached to those who do not join the military. Some positive incentives still exist, as military training invariably increases the draftee's chances of employment after service.

There are obligations for conscripts not only during, but also before and after the service term. Registering for draft takes place at age 14, and two rounds of physical examination are conducted at age 15 or 16. The physical examination ensures that draftees meet the requirement of being at least 148 cm tall and weighing 43 kg, although exceptions are made.

Drafting usually takes place at age 17 after graduating from senior middle school. Economic, political, and health concerns are weighed when draft is decided on. Postponing military service is possible for some if they continue education in high school or college.

Skilled workers, technicians, members of some government organizations, and children of political and military notables are often excluded from conscription. Some 30 percent of male middle school students, usually sons of the elite, are exempt from the draft to progress directly through high school to college or university. For instance, Kim Jong Il never went through the compulsory military service. In addition to the privileged, those considered politically unloyal (those with particularly bad songbun) are also exempt from service.

Upon conscription, servicemen are assigned to a branch, specialization, and a duty unit.

=== In service ===
Each conscript begins their service with basic training that lasts for about two months in the army, and up to three months in the air force and navy. Training methods emphasize memorization and repetition, but also psychological, occupational and technical skills. Drills often take place during nighttime, and repetitiveness is in part due to the low-tech nature of the force, but also to bring performance up to a standard. The training methods are effective, and produce a fighting force that is, according to James Minnich, "well versed in the basics even under adverse conditions". NCO candidates are chosen based on military merits. Because the overwhelming majority of officers have worked their way up the ranks, the result is an egalitarian corps whose officers are familiar with the concerns of ordinary recruits. Conditions are harsh, and training typically lasts from 5:00 AM to 10:00 PM.

Servicemen are expected to grow food to supplement their otherwise meager rations between 700 and 850 grams. Other activities not directly related to training are also imposed on them. Leaves are limited. A conscript may, in rare cases, be granted a two-week leave once or twice during his entire service. Service personnel are not allowed to marry, so conscripts typically stay single until they turn 30, in order that they would finish their Worker's Party admission process. About five percent of draftees, on the military's insistence, proceed to college or university after a year-long preparatory course. This route to higher education is considered easier than continuing studies right after middle school.

== Men ==
Conscription for men is universal. North Korean men serve up to 10 years in the combat forces and 13 years in specialized combat forces (e.g. missile forces).

== Women ==
North Korean women only serve up to 7 years in all military forces; the CIA estimates that women comprise about 20% of the military. They are selectively conscripted at a ratio where for every one female there are nine male conscripts. Women serve in all three service branches of the KPA: its Ground Force, Navy, and Air Force.

== See also ==
- Conscientious objector
- Conscription in South Korea
- Economic conscription
- Education in North Korea
- Human rights in North Korea
- Juche
- Law enforcement in North Korea
- Law of North Korea
- List of countries by number of military and paramilitary personnel
- Mass mobilization
- Military recruitment
- Mobilization
- Paramilitary
- Politics of North Korea
- Songun
- Women in North Korea
- Women in the military by country
- Women in the military
- Worker-Peasant Red Guards
