= Military Manpower Administration =

South Korean government agency

- 병무청

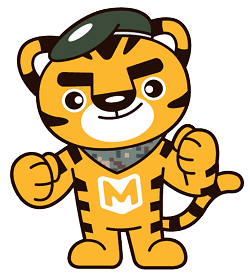
- Mascot character (Himchani)

Agency overview
- Formed: 20 August 1970; 55 years ago
- Jurisdiction: Government of South Korea
- Headquarters: 189, Cheongsaro, Seo-gu, Daejeon, South Korea; 36.3622267°N 127.3849235°E
- Annual budget: ₩351.7 billion US$282.78 million (2023)
- Agency executive: Hong So-young
- Parent department: Ministry of National Defense
- Website: Official MMA website in Korean; Official MMA website in English

Korean name
- Hangul: 병무청
- Hanja: 兵務廳
- RR: Byeongmucheong
- MR: Pyŏngmuch'ŏng

Former logo of Military Manpower Administration (1999 to 2016)

The Military Manpower Administration (MMA; Korean: 병무청) is a government agency in South Korea under the Ministry of National Defense. Its headquarters is in Seo District, Daejeon.

It has a Physical Reexamination Center in Daegu and a call center in Daejeon.

It gathers and manages information about 8.01 million South Koreans (16.8% of the total population), in order to facilitate conscription and wartime mobilization. It also handles the issuing of overseas travel permits for conscription candidates.

== History ==
On July 17, 1948, it was assigned by the Ministry of National Defense. On September 1, 1949, it was transferred to the Troop Military District Command under the banner of Army Headquarters. On July 1, 2002, it transferred control of jurisdiction to Military Manpower Administration. On 13 July 2025, Hong So-young became the first woman lead the Military Manpower Administration.

== See also ==
- Conscription in South Korea
