= Northeast Army =

Northeast Army may refer to:

- Northeastern Army of the Fengtian clique, during the warlord era of the Republic of China
- Northeast Anti-Japanese United Army, communist anti-Japanese guerrilla during the Second Sino-Japanese War
- Northeast People's Liberation Army (东北人民解放军), communist army in Northeast China during the Chinese Civil War
