= Fan Qing =

20th-century Chinese spy

- 范青

Personal details
- Party: Chinese Communist Party
- Other names: 胡登山 胡捷三 范青仁

Fan Qing
- Simplified Chinese: 范青
- Traditional Chinese: 範青
Transcriptions
Standard Mandarin
- Hanyu Pinyin: Fàn Qīng

Fan Qing (simplified Chinese: 范青; traditional Chinese: 範青) was an early figure in the Chinese Communist Party, and a spy for the Kenpeitai.

== Life and career ==
Fan Qing joined the Chinese Society of Engineering (中华工学会) in 1925, and took part in Chinese Communist Party (CCP) in 1927. In July, he betrayed the organization and became a spy for the Japanese secret service (Kenpeitai). The same year, he destroyed the underground party of the CCP in Shahekou, Dalian. Then he snuck into Fushun with the help of Kazuo Yoneki, the chief of local Japanese police department, and became a Japanese agent.

He then infiltrated the Manchurian Provincial Committee of the CCP under the guise of aiming restore party membership, and was assigned to work in Fushun.

After that, he often reported to the Kenpeitai, causing the Fushun underground party organization to be destroyed several times.

On August 30, 1929, Yang Jingyu and Ma Shouyu were arrested by the Japanese due to his reports. On November 10, 1930, he confessed that he took part in a meeting and found Lin Zhongdan was there. The next day, Lin was arrested on the train back to Fengtian. And the commissioner of the CCP of Manchuria Yang Yichen, as well as two members in local county committee, Zhang Yumin and Zhao Facai were also arrested that night. On August 12, 24 members includes Li Henian, Liu Rongzhi were arrested.

== Arrest and trial ==
After the founding of the People's Republic of China, in 1951, he was sentenced to four years in prison for assisting the Japanese military and the National Revolutionary Army. During this period, he was sentenced to another two years in prison after being accused of other offenses including sabotage. In 1964, Fushun City People's Procuratorate investigated him and found he often reported to the Japanese secret service, causing the underground party organization of Fushun and Dalian to be destroyed several times. Then, the procuratorate reviewed and prosecuted Qing in the Fushun Intermediate People's Court. In the same year, the Fushun Intermediate People's Court sentenced Fan Qing to life imprisonment.
