= Yunnan Military Academy =

Military academy in China, 1909 to 1935

Coordinates: 25.0508°N 102.6994°E

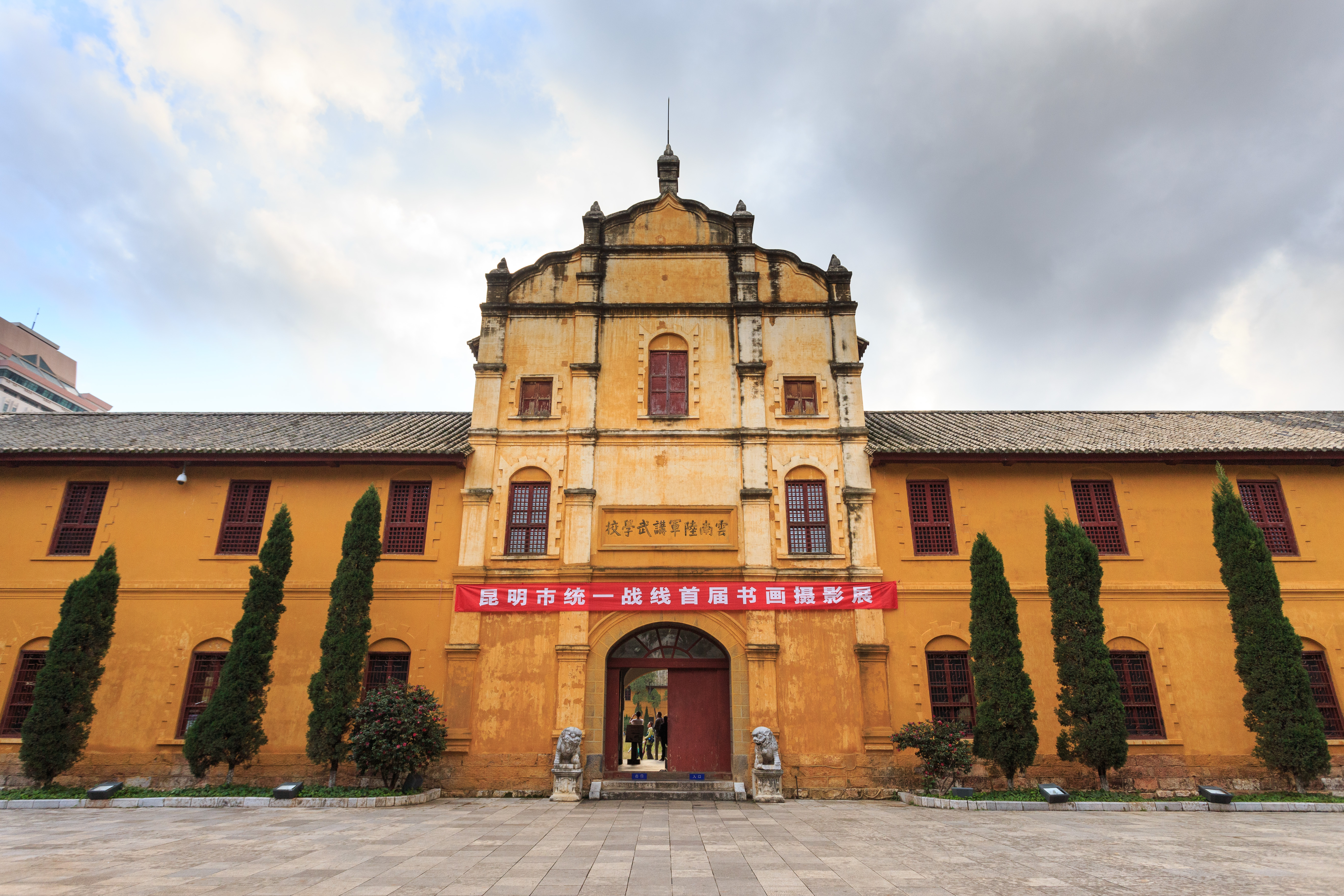
Yunnan Military Academy

Yunnan Military Academy (simplified Chinese: 云南陆军讲武堂; traditional Chinese: 雲南陸軍講武堂) was a military academy based in Kunming, capital of Yunnan, during the late Qing dynasty and early Republic of China. Along with Huangpu Military Academy (Whampoa Military Academy) and Baoding Military Academy, Yunnan Military Academy was one of the "three major strategist cradles in modern China".

The academy was founded in 1909 in Kunming, capital of Yunnan province and ceased operating in 1935 because of the demands of the Second Sino-Japanese War. It enrolled 22 classes of students during its 26 years and in total educated more than 9000 trainees.

Many famous military leaders graduated from Yunnan Military Academy, including Zhu De, who taught at the Academy after his graduation in July 1911 and whose residence is now a museum in an area across Green Lake park from the academy. Other leaders included Ye Jianying, Marshall of the People's Liberation Army and Zhou Baozhong, a commander of the Northeast Anti-Japanese United Army and after the Chinese Civil War, Vice chairman of Yunnan People's Government. All of these leaders played important roles during the Second Sino-Japanese War.

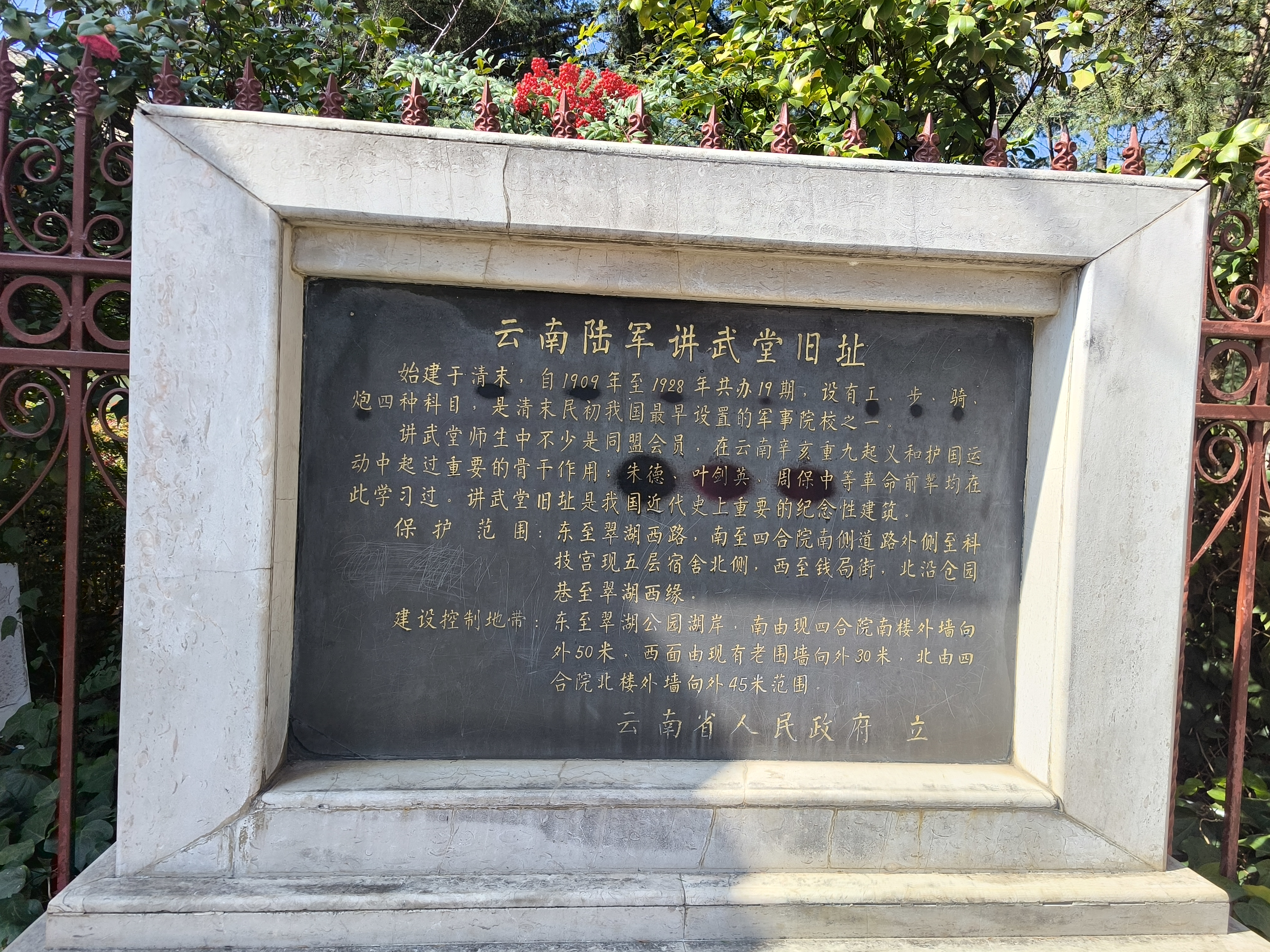
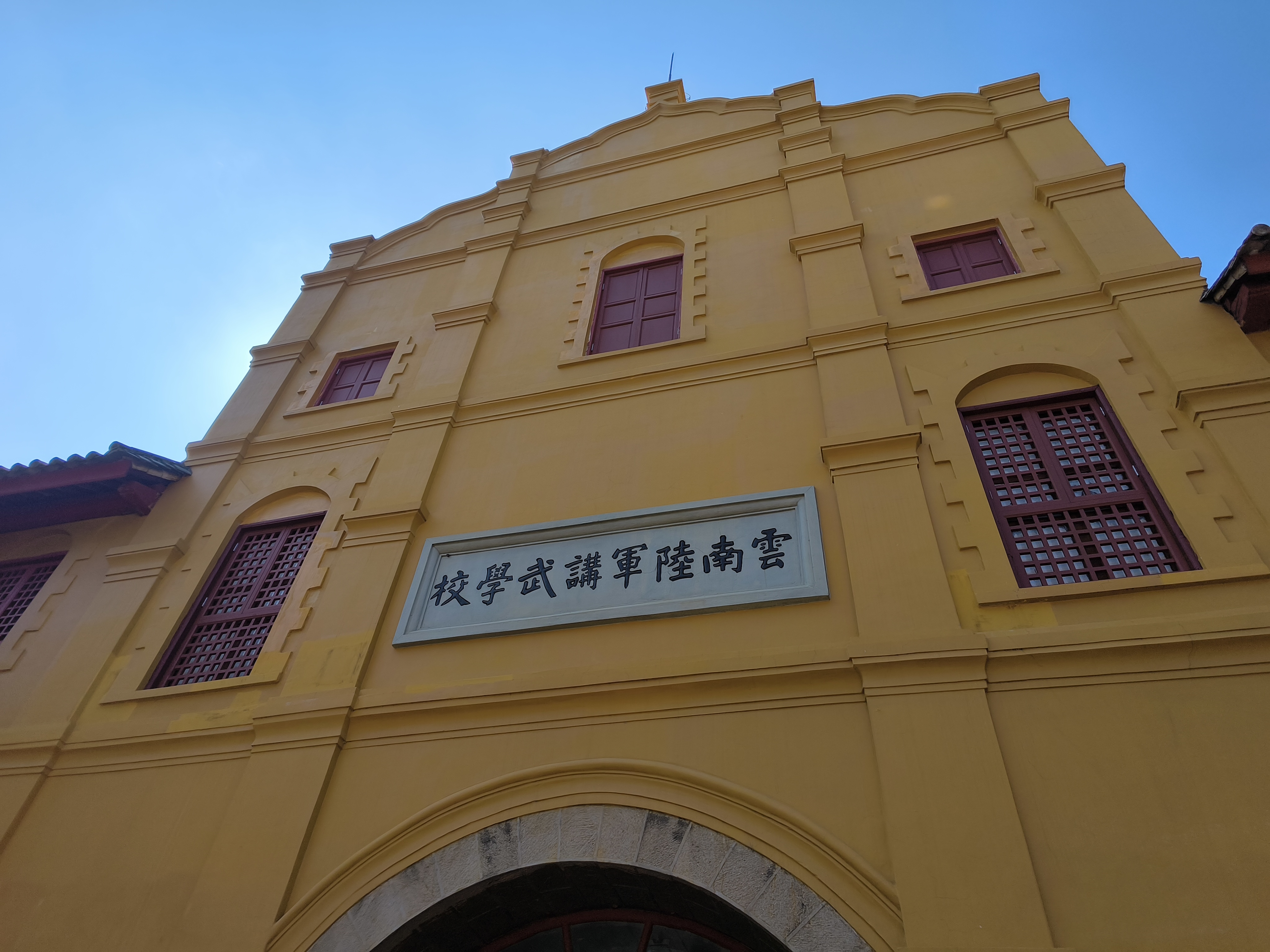
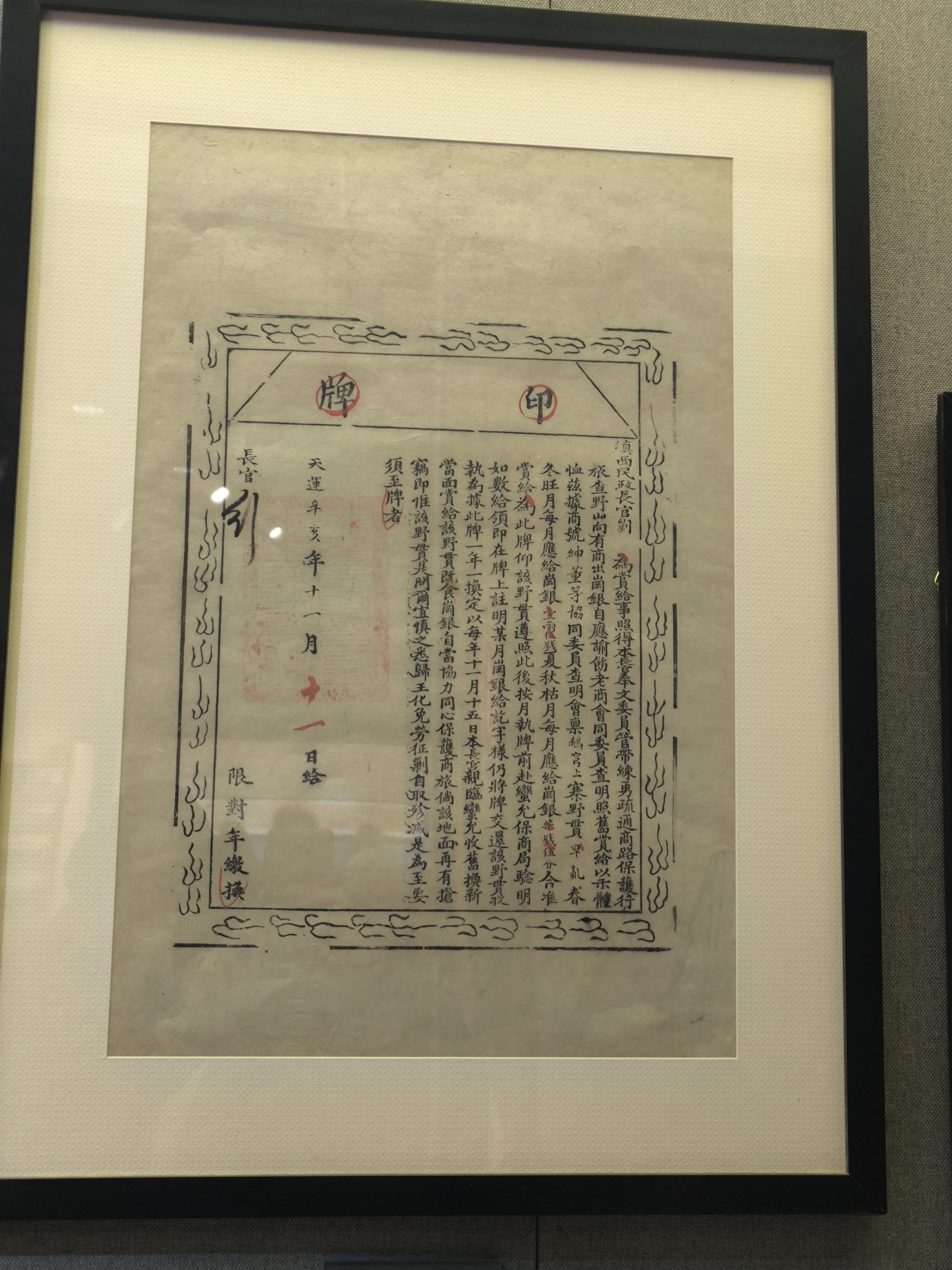
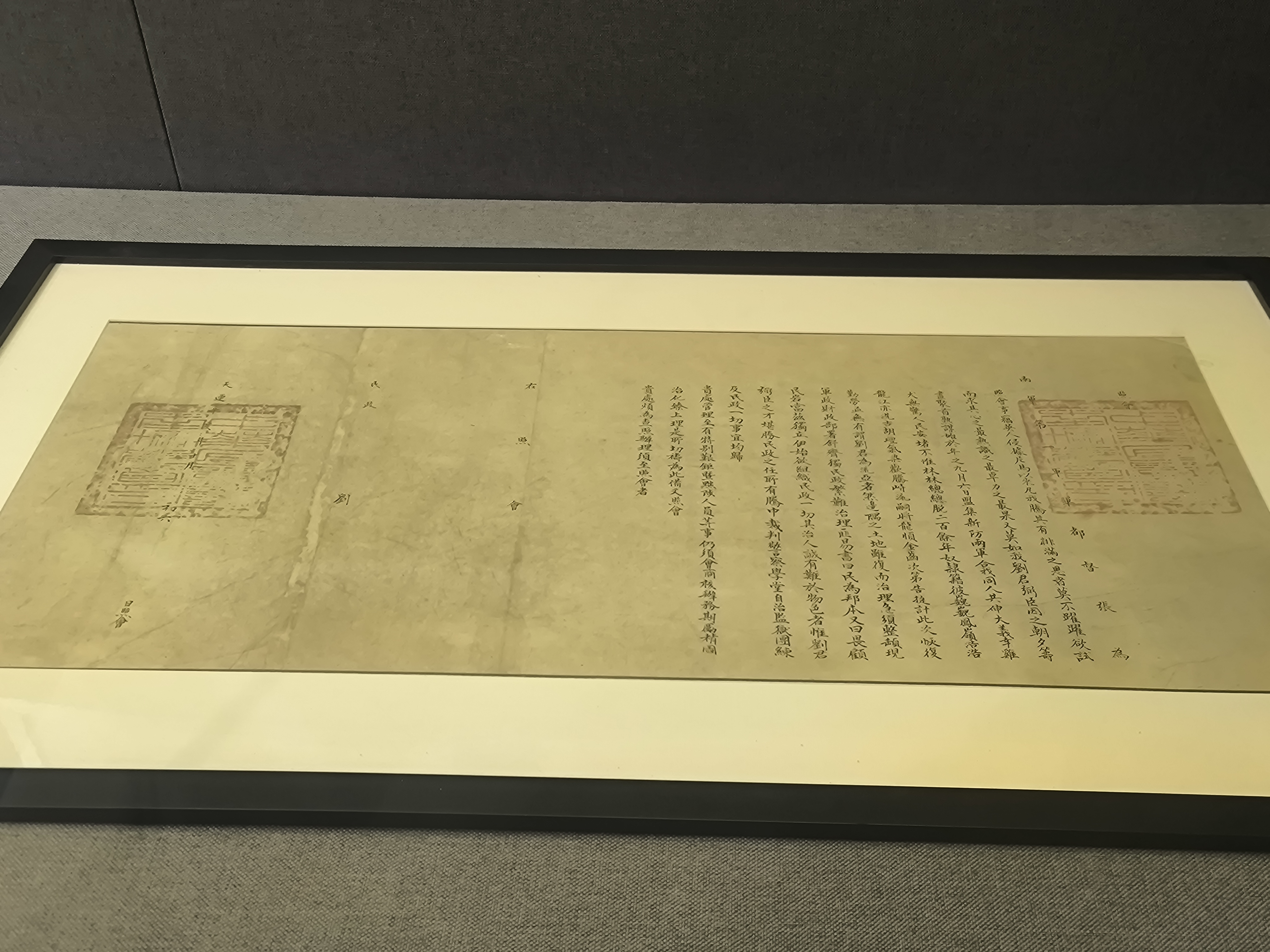
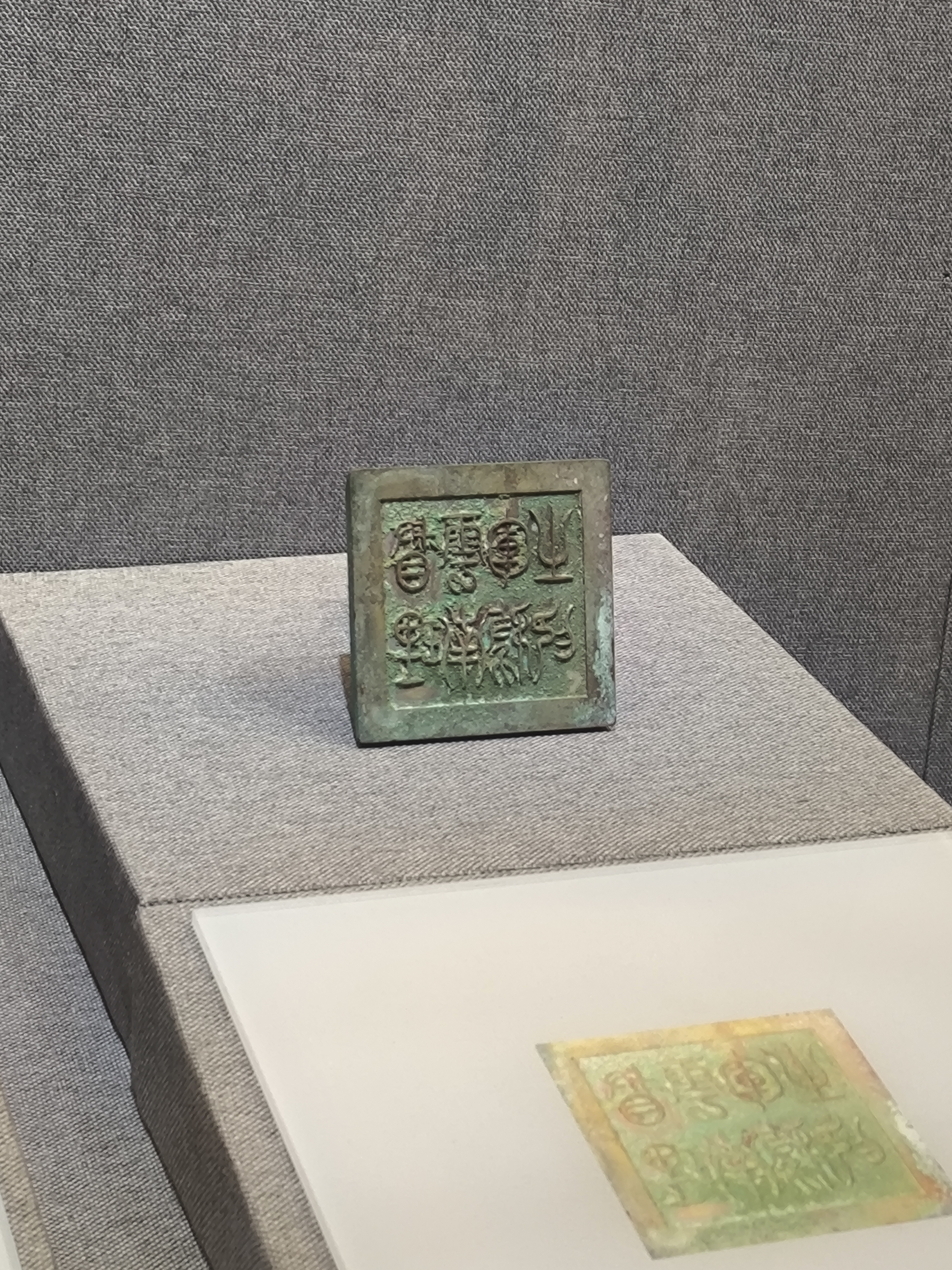
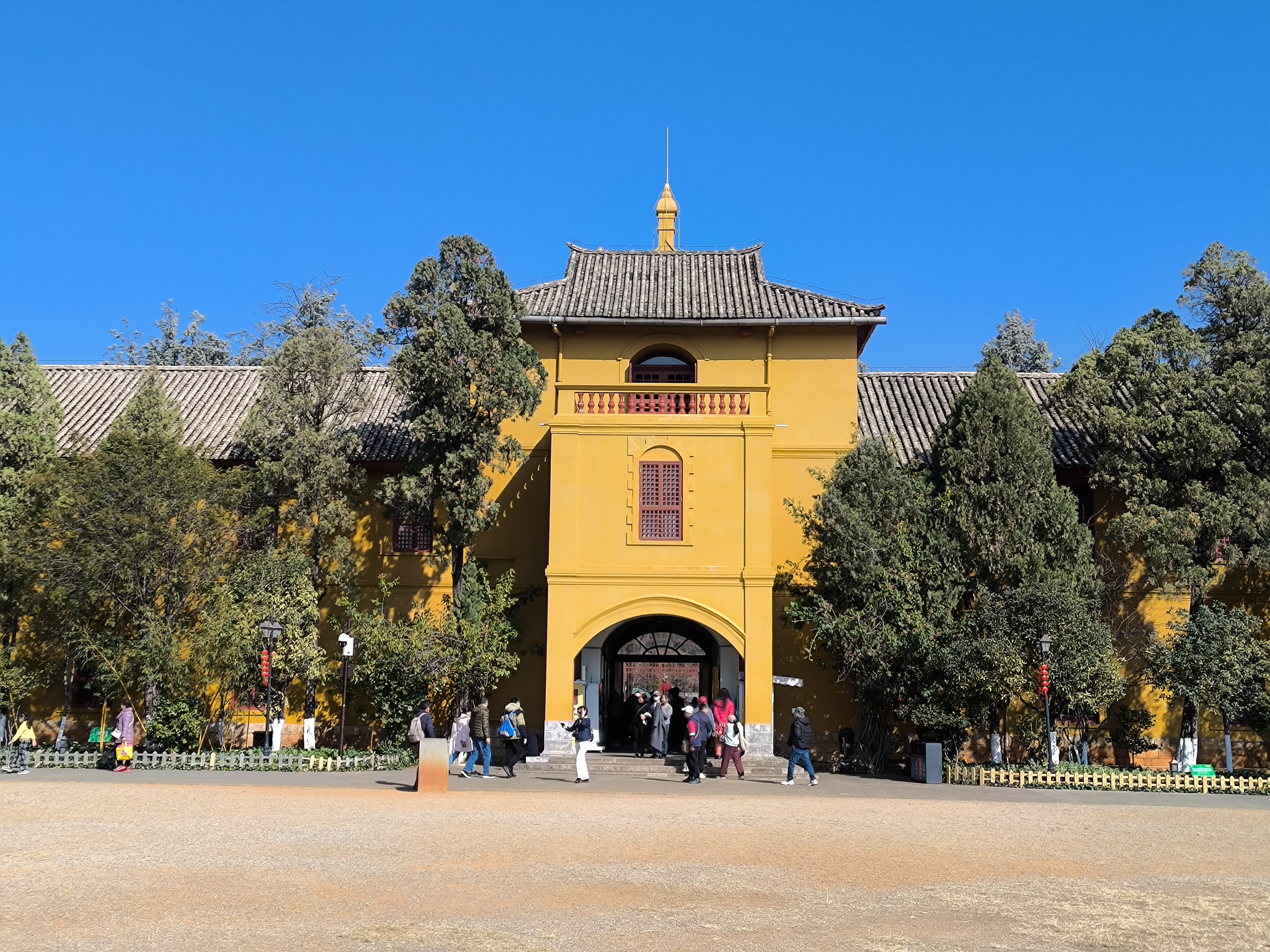

Three stages:

First period: 1909-1911, graduating classes 1-3. The school was established by Qing government.

Second period: 1912-1928, classes 4-19. During 1918-1920 a branch campus was established in Shaozhou (now is called Shaoguan city) in Guangdong province.

Third period: 1929-1935, classes 20-22. The Academy received approval from the Nanjing National Government and continued for six years.
