= Zhou Baozhong =

Chinese Communist military commander

- 周保中
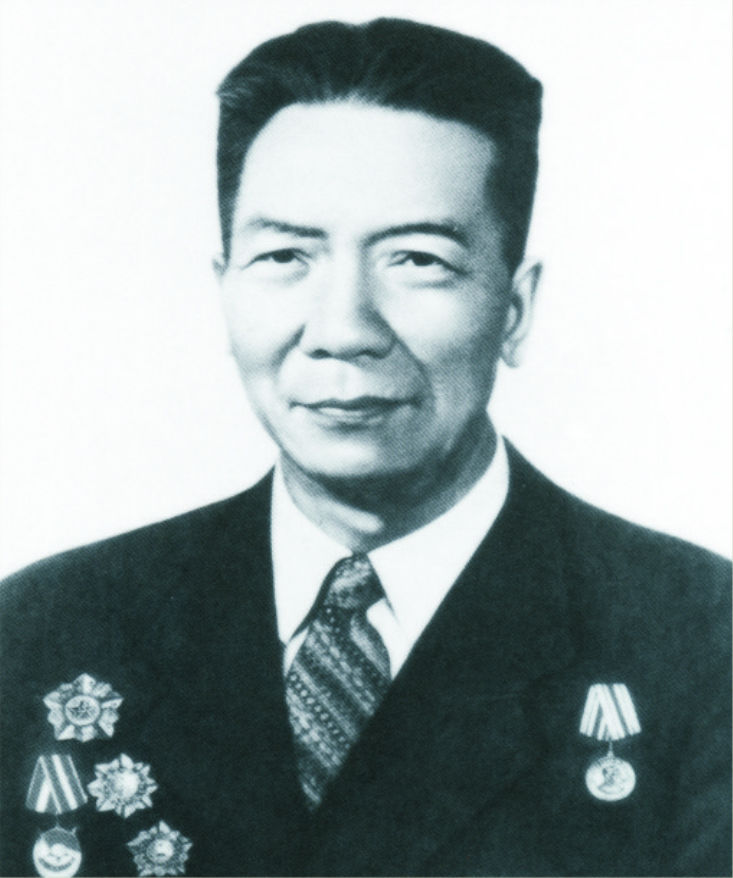

1st Chairman of the Jilin Provincial Government, Communist China
- In office 30 December 1945 – September 1949
- Preceded by: Post established Xu Jiahuan (as Governor of Jilin Province, Manchukuo)
- Succeeded by: Post abolished Zhou Chiheng (as Chairman of the Jilin Provincial People's Government)

Vice Chairman of the Yunnan Provincial People's Government
- In office March 1950 – July 1952 Serving with Zhang Chong, Yang Wenqing
- Chairman: Chen Geng
- Party Secretary: Song Renqiong

Personal details
- Born: Xi Liyuan (奚李元); 7 February 1902 Dali Prefecture, Yunnan, Qing Empire
- Died: April 22, 1964 (aged 62) Beijing, People's Republic of China
- Education: Yunnan Military Academy
- Awards: August 1 Medal (First Class); Order of Independence and Freedom (First Class); Order of Liberation (First Class); Order of the Red Banner; Medal "For the Victory over Japan"

Military service
- Allegiance: Republic of China; Communist China; USSR
- Years of service: 1917–1949
- Rank: General-grade officer (PLA); Lieutenant Colonel (Soviet Red Army); Major General (NRA)
- Battles/wars: Constitutional Protection Movement; Northern Expedition; World War II; Second Sino-Japanese War; Counterinsurgency in Manchuria; Soviet invasion of Manchuria; Chinese Civil War; Changchun Offensive (1946)
- Other political offices held: 1953–1954: Director, Political and Legal Committee, Southwest Administrative Committee; 1952–1953: Director, Political and Legal Committee, Southwest Military and Political Committee; 1952–1953: Minister of Civil Affairs, Southwest Military and Political Committee; 1950–1952: Deputy Director, Yunnan Provincial Military and Political Committee; Military offices held: 1950 - 1952: Deputy Director, Kunming Military Control Commission

Zhou Baozhong (Note: Chinese: 周保中; pinyin: Zhōu Bǎozhōng; Wade-Giles: Chou¹ Pao³-chung¹) (7 February 1902 – 22 April 1964) was a commander of the 88th Separate Rifle Brigade and Northeast Anti-Japanese United Army resisting the pacification of Manchukuo by the Empire of Japan.

After the Chinese Civil War, he was made Vice Governor of Yunnan province in 1949.

== Early life ==
He was born in 1902 in Dali Prefecture, Yunnan. His birth name was Xi Liyuan. In 1915, he was admitted to the provincial Dali No. 2 Middle School with excellent results. After the second grade of junior high school, because of the attack of his hometown by warlords and bandits, he dropped out of school and went home to work in farming.

== Military career ==
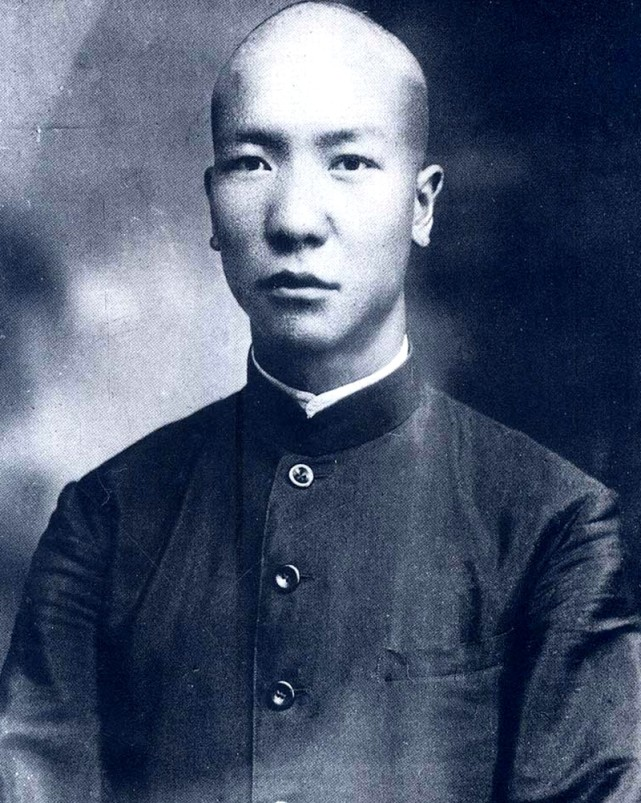
Zhou Baozhong (1920s)

In February 1917, at the age of 15, he joined the army and participated in the Constitutional Protection Movement. From 1923, he was selected to study engineering at the Yunnan Military Academy and successfully graduated the next year.

In 1926, he participated in the Northern Expedition. In March 1927, Zhou served as deputy commander of the 56th Regiment of the Sixth Army of Cheng Qian's National Revolutionary Army. In 1927, he joined the Chinese Communist Party (CCP) in Wuhan.

After the fighting between the Kuomintang and CCP led to Chinese Civil War, he stayed in the Sixth Army of the National Revolutionary Army to perform secret work in accordance with the instructions of the Yangtze River Bureau of the Central Committee of the Chinese Communist Party. In December 1927, he served as the deputy commander of the 18th Division of the Sixth Army. According to the Jilin Archives Information Network, Zhou was promoted to Major General while posting at the 18th Division. During this time, he engaged in troop movement and liaison work in Hunan, Zhejiang, Henan and other provinces. At the end of 1928, Zhou entered the special class of Communist University of the Toilers of the East in the Soviet Union to study military affairs, where his classmate was future Marshal of China Ye Jianying. Later, he was transferred to the International Lenin School to study politics.

=== Second Sino-Japanese War ===
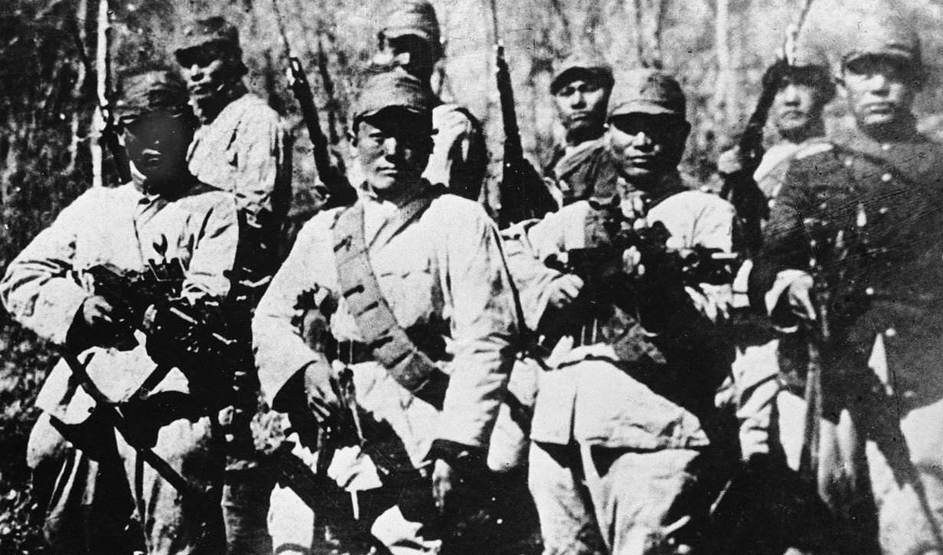
Soldiers of the Northeast Anti-Japanese United Army

After the September 18th incident in 1931, he returned to China and went to the Northeast, which was then part of the Japanese puppet state of Manchukuo, to serve in the leadership of the Northeast Anti-Japanese United Army. He served as a member of the Manchuria Provincial Committee and Secretary of the Military Commission of the CCP. During this time, he changed his name to Zhou Baozhong.

As chief of the general staff, he led the army in two battles to conquer Antu County and three battles against the city of Ning'an. In February 1934, he led the formation of the Suining Anti-Japanese Allied Forces, served as the chairman of the military committee, and led his troops to carry out guerrilla activities in Ning'an.

Zhou successively served as the commander of the 5th Army of the Northeast Anti-Japanese Allied Army. The unit fought mostly within the Heilongjiang Province. In March 1937, he commanded troops to fight Yilan City, where they caused more than 300 Japanese casualties. In October 1937, the Fourth, Fifth, Seventh, Eighth, and Tenth armies of the Anti-Japanese Army was reorganized into the 2nd Route Army. Zhou served as the commander-in-chief of the Second Route Army of the Northeast Anti-Japanese United Army and secretary of the CCP Jidong Provincial Committee. The main guerrilla bases were located in more than 20 counties on the banks of Songhua and Ussuri Rivers. After the reorganization of the army in 1937, Zhou became the commander of the Third Route Army, which was active in the mountainous areas of eastern Jilin Province.

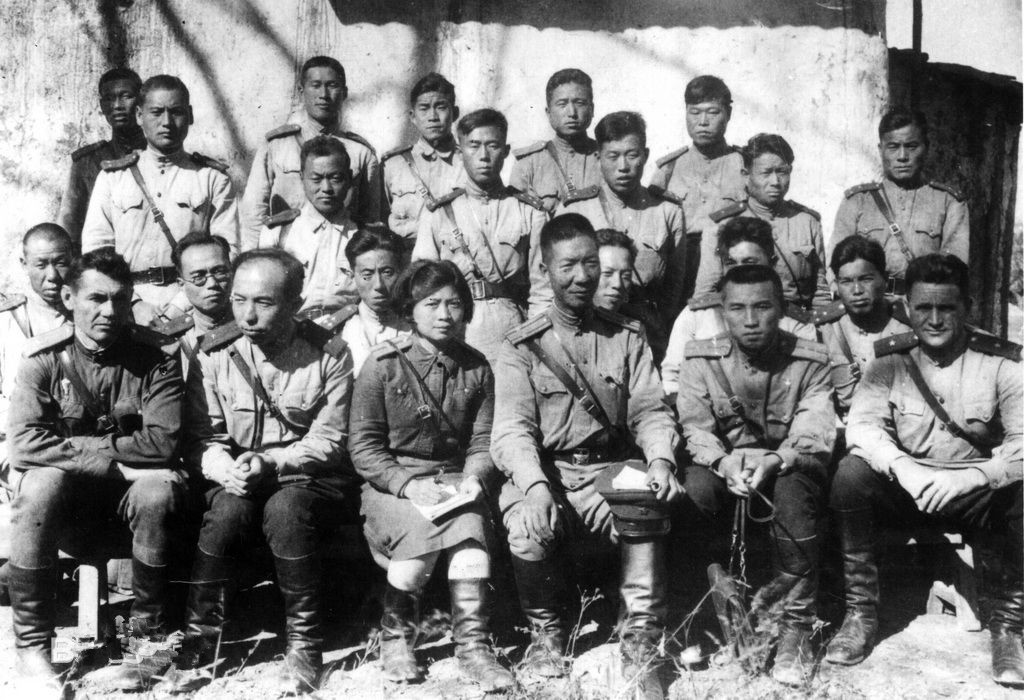
Members of the 88th Separate Rifle Brigade, an international military unit of the Red Army. Zhou is at the front row, third from right. On Zhou's right is future leader of North Korea Kim Il Sung

In 1940, the unit withdrew into the Soviet Union for training, after suffering from massive losses due to Japanese retaliatory attacks. This was in accordance with the discussions between Zhou, Li Zhaolin and Feng Zhongyun with the Communist Party of the Soviet Union Committee of the Far Eastern Territory and the Soviet Far Eastern Army at headquarters in Khabarovsk. During this time, he met and became acquainted with future leader of North Korea Kim Il-sung, who also served in Zhou's unit.

In early August 1941, the teaching brigade of the Northeast Anti-Japanese Allied Forces was established in the Soviet Union, with Zhou serving as the brigade commander. In February 1942, Zhou Baozhong and Zhao Shangzhi returned to the Northeast Second Route Army headquarters from Soviet Union. On August 1, the Northeast Anti-Japanese Army was reorganized into the 88th Separate Rifle Brigade of the Soviet Red Army’s Far Eastern Front, and Zhou was appointed as its commander. Zhou was made a Lieutenant Colonel in the Red Army.

In August 1945, following the Soviet invasion of Manchuria, Zhou led his troops in cooperating with the Red Army's march into the Northeast China. As a result, the troops were transferred from the Northeast to the Eighth Route Army and the New Fourth Army. On August 11, Zhou summoned troops to board the ship according to a predetermined plan and arrived in Heilongjiang to return home.

=== Chinese Civil War ===
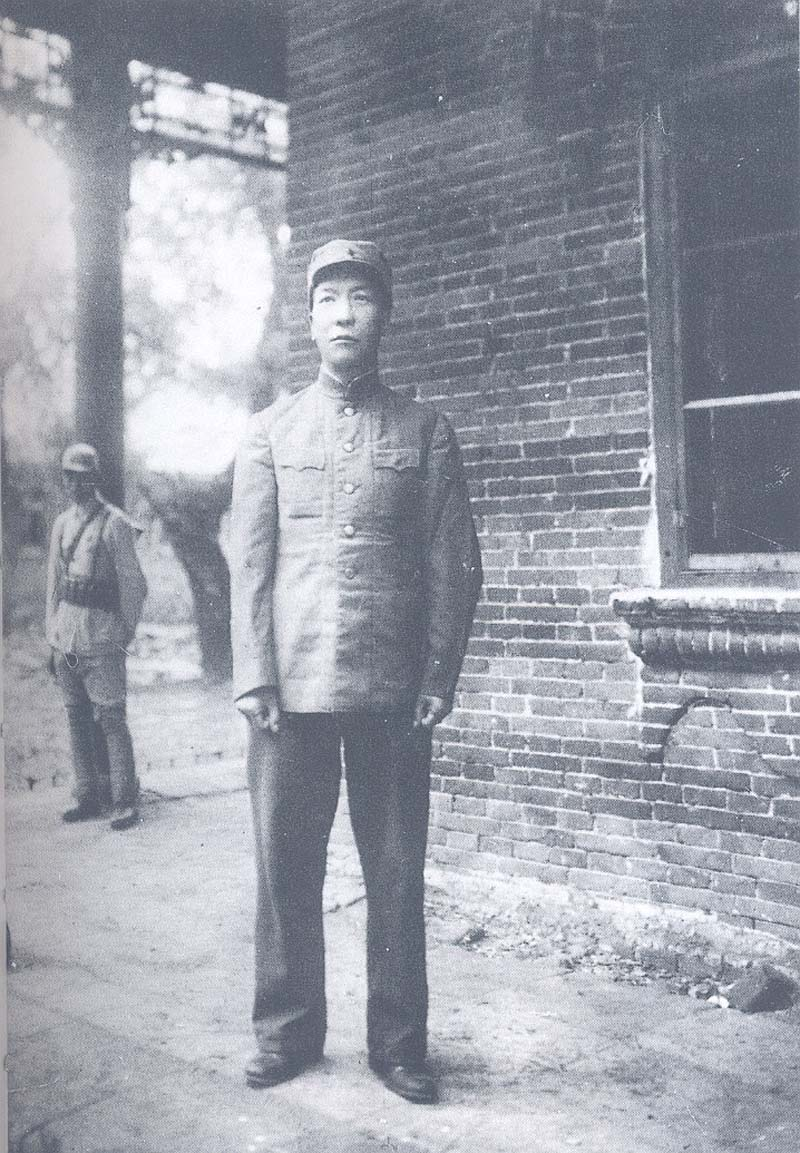
Zhou Baozhong in Yanji in August 1946

Zhou returned to Changchun in September 1945, under the alias Huang Shaoyuan. He served as the deputy commander of the Soviet garrison headquarters in Changchun. In September of the same year, the Northeast Anti-Japanese Army was renamed the Northeast People's Self-Defense Force, and Zhou was appointed as its general commander. On October 31, the former Northeast Anti-Japanese Army and indigenous armed groups were combined to form the Northeastern People's Autonomous Army. Zhou was appointed deputy chief of staff under the command of Lin Biao.

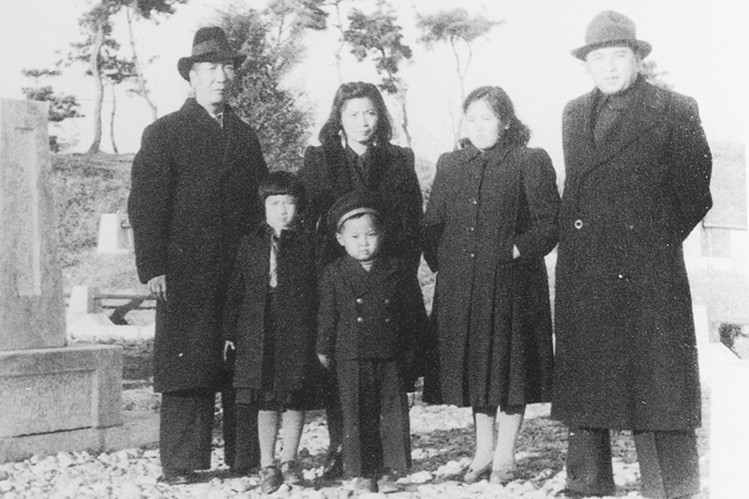
Zhou Baozhong (left) and Kim Il-sung (right) with their families at a tomb of an anti-Japanese resistance fighter in Pyongyang, North Korea (1948)

He also served as secretary of the Jihe District Party Committee, commander and political commissar of the Jihe National Army, and chairman of the Jihe Administrative Committee in Hubei. In November, the Jilin Provincial Working Committee and Jilin Military Region were established. Zhou served as a member of the Provincial Working Committee and commander of the Jilin Military Region.

In January 1946, the Northeast People's Autonomous Army was renamed as Northeast Democratic Alliance Army, and Zhou served as the deputy commander-in-chief of the Northeast Democratic Alliance Army and commander of the Jilin Military Region. On April 14, 1946, part of the main force of the Northeast Democratic Alliance Army, together with the Jilin Military Region, was divided into three columns under the command of Zhou to attack the Kuomintang units in Changchun. The battle led to the destruction of Kuomintang's Northeast Security Corps fourth and fifth units, leading to a major Chinese Communist military victory in the Northeast in October 1948. However, after the Democratic Alliance Army was renamed the Northeastern People's Liberation Army in January 1948, it was reorganized into the Fourth Field Army in November 1948 and on the same month, Zhou was dismissed as a deputy commander.

In September 1949, Zhou Baozhong served as commander-in-chief and political commissar of the Northeast People's Self-Defense Army, deputy commander-in-chief of the Northeast Democratic Alliance Army and commander of the Dongman Military Region, chairman of the Jilin Provincial Government, deputy commander of the Northeast Military Region of the Chinese People's Liberation Army and commander of the Jilin Military Region. He also served as the Northeast Member of the Standing Committee of the Administrative Committee.

During the Chinese Civil War, Zhou led his troops to fought more than 800 battles against the Kuomintang and caused more than 40,000 casualties among the enemy troops. In October 1948, his unit played an important role in the second occupation of Changchun. On September 8, 1949, Zhou Baozhong went to Beijing. On September 21, he attended the Chinese People's Political Consultative Conference and participated in the founding ceremony of the People's Republic of China. When he was about to go to Yunnan to take up his political post, he was admitted to a hospital in Beijing due to a heart attack. At his bedside, he was visited by Liu Shaoqi and Premier of China, Zhou Enlai, who urged him to recover well and not rush to take office. In November 1949, Zhou went to Yunnan.

== Political career ==
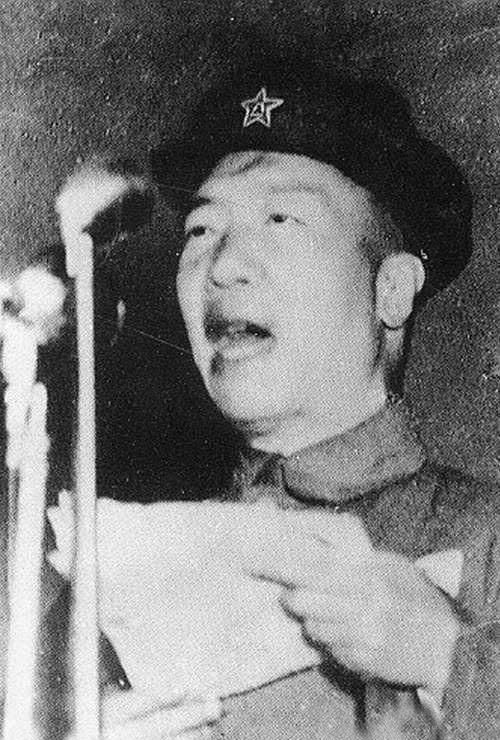
Zhou gives a speech in Kunming (1950)

After the founding of People's Republic of China, Zhou Baozhong was made Vice Chairman of the Yunnan Provincial People's Government in 1949. In February 1950, he and Chairman Chen Geng met with Kuomintang "uprising general" Wan Baobang, then in hiding in Kunming, and appointed him as a member of the Yunnan Provincial Military Control Commission of the People's Liberation Army. He also served as deputy director of the Yunnan Provincial Military and Political Committee and the Kunming Military Control Commission, Director of the Southwestern Political and Legal Committee and Minister of Civil Affairs for Southwest China.

From October 1951 to May 1957, he concurrently served as the President of Yunnan University and as Dean and Party Secretary of the Southwest University of Political Science and Law from August 1953 to October 1954.

According to US intelligence, at a conference in Harbin, the North Koreans and the Chinese concluded an agreement providing for the return of all North Korean volunteer and reserve troops, totaling 82,000, to their own country. Zhou was one of the four Chinese representatives at the meeting, along with Lin Biao, Xiao Ke and Li Lisan. A CIA report on 5 February 1952 named Zhou Baozhong as 2nd Deputy Commander of the "Chinese Communist Aid DRV Volunteers" force, with Chen Geng as his contemporary, Liu Bocheng as Commander and Zhuang Tian in the role of Chief of Staff.

In 1954, due to severe heart failure and the recurrence of gallstones, the Central Government decided that Zhou would be recuperating in Beijing from August 1954. Prior to this, Zhou Enlai visited him in at the hospital in May 1954 and told him to recover from his illness with peace of mind. He advised him to write and sort out the historical materials of the Northeast Anti-Japanese United Army after recovery. Beginning in the second half of 1954, Zhou organized and wrote the history of the Northeast Anti-Japanese Allied Forces. During this time, North Korean leader Kim Il-sung met Zhou at the Summer Palace.

In April 1956, he was elected as a representative of the Second National People's Congress and a member of the State Ethnic Affairs Commission. In September, he was elected as an alternate member of the Central Committee at the Eighth National Congress. Mao Zedong concurrently appointed Zhou as a member of the National Defense Commission. In April 1959, he was again elected as a representative of the Second National People's Congress and a member of the National Ethnic Affairs Commission.

At the beginning of 1964, Zhou was so seriously ill that he was bedridden. On April 21, 1964, he suffered another heart attack and a doctor was sent to provide him with medical assistance. Zhou died on next day in a hospital in Beijing, at the age of 62. Following his death, North Korean leader Kim Il Sung immediately sent a telegram of condolences and assigned the staff of the North Korean Embassy in China to attend Zhou's funeral services.

== Personal life ==
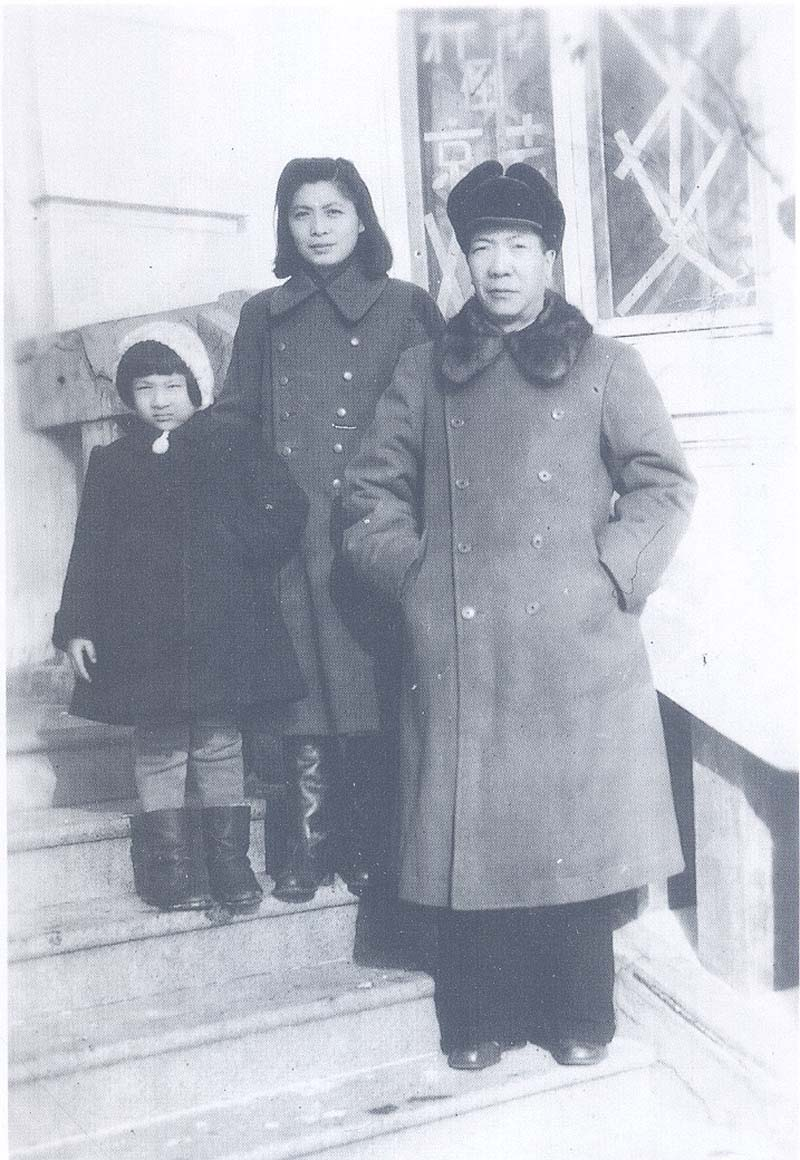
Zhou with his wife Wang Yizhi and daughter Zhou Wei (1948)

Zhou was married to Red Army Lieutenant Wang Yizhi on October 6, 1939, at the temporary station of the Second Route Army headquarters. They had a daughter named Zhou Wei, who was born in the Soviet Union on 1942. Because his previous wife and son had tragically passed due to an accident at sea, when he held his daughter Zhou Wei, he couldn't help but be overwhelmed with emotions, "I had a daughter at forty, and that's enough." Wang died on November 26, 1987.

Zhou Wei was admitted to the Second Military Medical University of the People's Liberation Army in 1962, and worked in the 301 Hospital of the Beijing Military Region in 1973. She successively worked in anesthesiology and hyperbaric oxygen medicine until her retirement. Due to the close relationship between her father and Kim Il Sung, she often visits North Korea to nurture relations between China and North Korea. An investigation by the Wall Street Journal revealed that businesses connected to the Zhou's family helped enrich North Korea with its national income that contributed to its weapons development. Business records, official media reports and interviews connect Zhou's family with North Korean industries including mining, trade and consumer goods. A member of the family denied that they do business in North Korea.

== Awards and decorations ==
- China:
  - Order of August the First (1st Class Medal) (1955)
  - Order of Independence and Freedom (1st Class Medal) (1955)
  - Order of Liberation (1st Class Medal) (1955)
- Soviet Union:
  - Order of the Red Banner (1945)
  - Medal "For the Victory over Japan" (1945)

=== Other honors ===
The Zhou Baozhong Memorial Hall was built in his hometown of Wanqiao village in Dali City, Yunnan. A tall statue of Zhou was built in front of the museum.

== In popular culture ==
In the 2015 Chinese TV series Northeast Anti-Japanese United Army, he was played by actor Shi Guanghui.

== Gallery ==
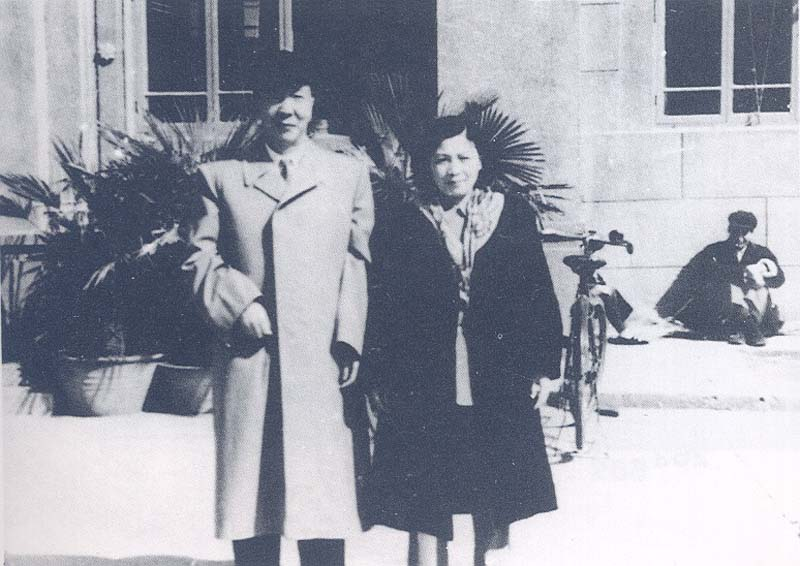
Zhou and his wife in Beijing (1957)

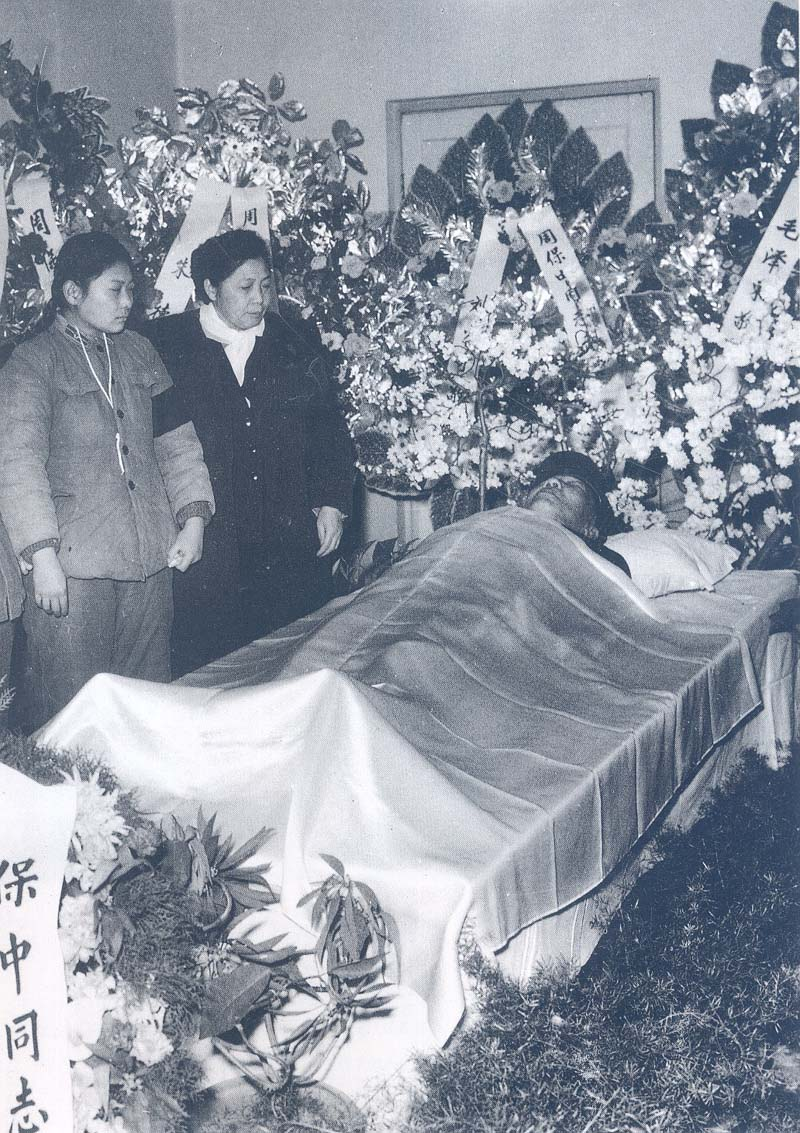
Zhou's wife and daughter stand next to his body during his funeral (1964)

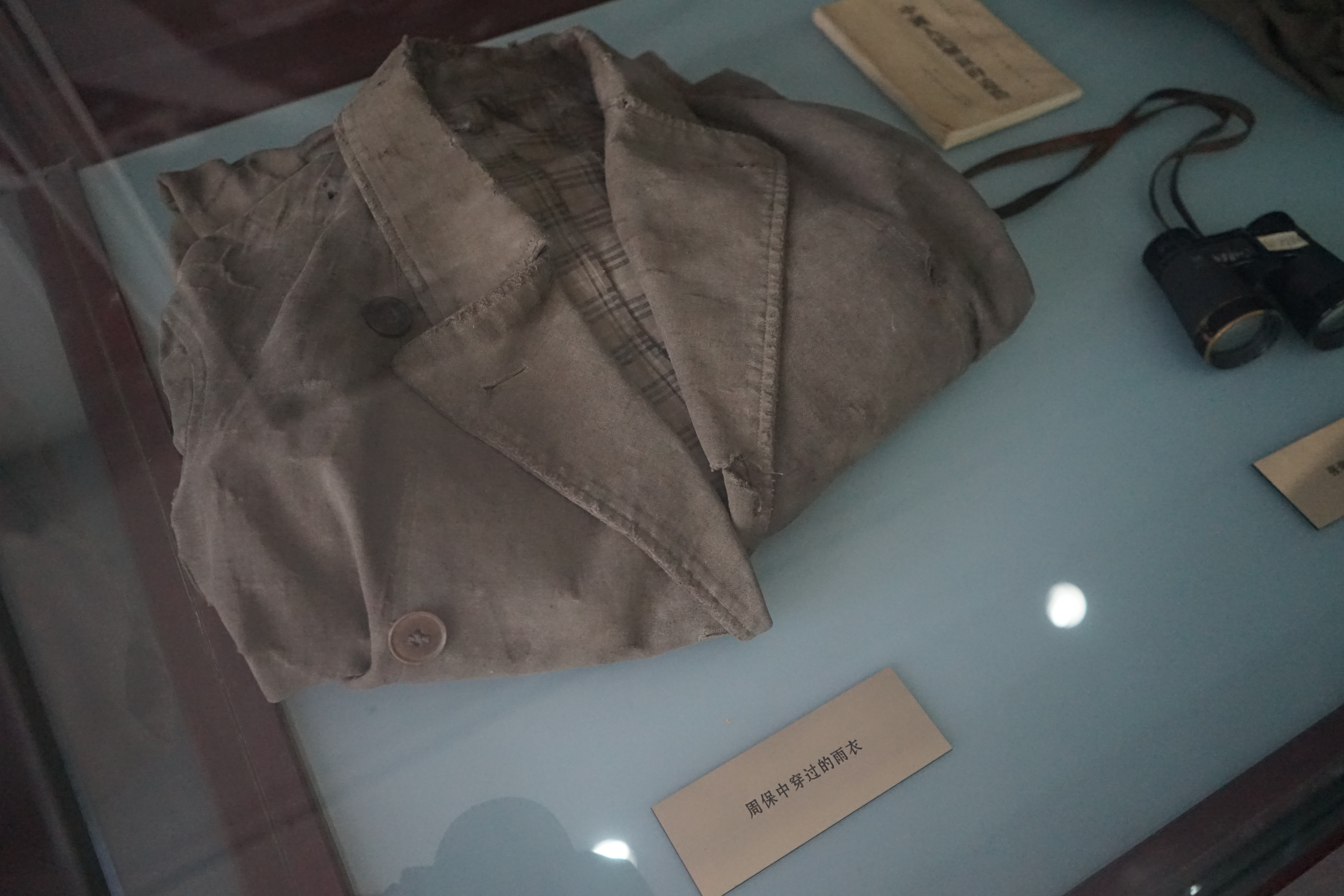
Zhou's raincoat and binoculars at the Northeast China Revolutionary Matyrs' Memorial Hall

== See also ==
- 88th Separate Rifle Brigade
- Kim Il Sung
- Choi Yong-kun
- Yang Jingyu
- Zhou Enlai
- Cheng Qian
- Chen Geng
- Song Renqiong

== Bibliography ==
- Hiramatsu, Shigeo (1988). China and Korean War (Hardcover). Keiso Shobo. ISBN 9784326350810.
- Haruki, Wada (1993). "Kim Il Sung and the Manchurian Anti-Japanese War". Ann Arbor: The Journal of Asian Studies.
