= Zhao Yiman =

Chinese communist revolutionary

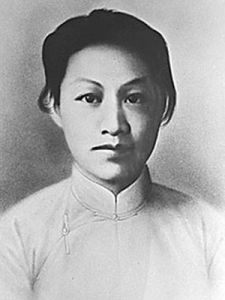
- Born: Li Kuntai (李坤泰); 25 October 1905; Yibin County, Xuzhou Prefecture, Sichuan, Qing China (present-day Yibin, Sichuan, China)
- Died: 2 August 1936 (aged 30); Zhuhe County, Binjiang Province, Manchukuo (present-day Shangzhi, Heilongjiang, China)
- Education: Moscow Sun Yat-sen University
- Spouse: Chen Dabang (m. 1928)
- Children: 1 son
- Military career
- Allegiance: Chinese Communist Party
- Branch: Northeast Anti-Japanese United Army

Zhao Yiman
- Traditional Chinese: 趙一曼
- Simplified Chinese: 赵一曼
Transcriptions
Standard Mandarin
- Hanyu Pinyin: Zhào Yīmàn
- Wade–Giles: Chao I-man

Zhao Yiman (Chinese: 趙一曼; Wade–Giles: Chao I-man; 1905 – 2 August 1936) was a female Chinese resistance fighter against the Imperial Japanese Army in Northeast China, which was under the occupation of the Japanese puppet state Manchukuo. She was captured in 1935 by Japanese forces and executed in 1936. She is considered a national hero in China, and an eponymous biopic was made for her in 1950. The 2005 film My Mother Zhao Yiman was based on her son's memory of her.

== Early life ==
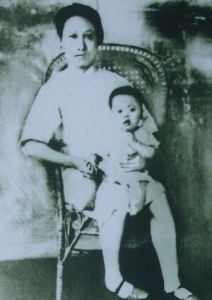
Zhao Yiman and her son Ning'er

Zhao was born Li Kuntai in October 1905 in Yibin County, Sichuan, into a landlord family with eight children. As a girl, she rebelled against foot binding and fought for the right to go to school. In 1913, she began attending a private school, where she did well academically. Under the influence of her brother-in-law Zheng Youzhi, a communist, she read many progressive books and periodicals and became receptive to revolutionary ideas. In 1924, at the age of 19, she joined the Socialist Youth League of China and began revolutionary activities in her county. That year, she published an article in the radical women's magazine Women's Weekly in which she denounced her elder brother for refusing to pay for her education.

== Revolutionary career ==
During the May Thirtieth Movement in 1925, Zhao led students in blocking British kerosene tankers from docking at the pier in Yibin. In 1926, she enrolled at the Yibin Women's High School, where she became a leader of the student movement, and in the summer of that year, she joined the Chinese Communist Party. In the autumn of 1926, the party sent her to the Central Military and Political School in Wuhan, the Wuhan branch of the Whampoa Military Academy, where she was one of the first women students. In 1927, she took part in the Northern Expedition campaign led by Ye Ting.

In September 1927, Zhao went to the Soviet Union to study at Moscow Sun Yat-sen University, where she used the name Li Yichao. The Biographical Dictionary of Chinese Women instead states that she studied at the Communist University of the Toilers of the East. In Moscow, she married Chen Dabang, a fellow student and former Whampoa cadet, in 1928.

=== Underground work ===
Zhao was ordered back to China while she was pregnant, and she returned in the winter of 1928. She did underground work for the party in Hubei, Jiangxi and Shanghai, including in Yichang and Nanchang, at the time of Chiang Kai-shek's campaign against leftists and radicals. In 1929, she gave birth to a son in Yichang. When the boy was about two years old, she left him with his uncle Chen Yueyun, after having a photograph taken with him, which she sent to her husband.

=== Northeast China ===
After the Mukden Incident of 1931, Zhao took the name Zhao Yiman and was sent to Japanese-occupied Northeast China. She worked in Shenyang and among women workers in Harbin, and in 1932, she became acting secretary of the Harbin General Workers' Union. In April 1933, she guided a strike by Harbin tram workers, which won its demands. After the Japanese broke up the party organization in Harbin, she and her colleagues retreated to the countryside, and from 1932 to 1934, she held various party posts at provincial and county levels.

In July 1934, Zhao went to Zhuhe County, now Shangzhi, as a special commissioner (tepaiyuan) of the party and a member of its Zhuhe Central County Committee, and she became known locally as a guerrilla leader. In 1935, she became political commissar of the 2nd Regiment of the 1st Division of the Third Army of the Northeastern People's Revolutionary Army. Japanese-run newspapers called her the female commissar "with two guns and a white horse", and the Japanese named her as a target alongside the guerrilla commander Zhao Shangzhi.

== Capture, imprisonment and execution ==
In November 1935, as the Third Army retreated eastward before the Japanese, the 2nd Regiment was left to fight along the railway to cover the withdrawal and was surrounded. Zhao told the regiment's commander to break out while she and a squad of soldiers covered him, and she was badly wounded and captured. According to the Biographical Dictionary of Chinese Women, she was hit in the right eye and left arm and lost consciousness from loss of blood. A report dated 7 December 1935 by the police department of the Manchukuo provincial government of Binjiang, which the Heilongjiang Provincial Archives displayed in 2025, records that ten police officers surrounded a house in the fifth district of Zhuhe County on 22 November, killing two of its five occupants and capturing three, and that Zhao had serious wounds to her left arm and left leg. The report gave her age as 27 and her nickname as "Skinny Li", and most of the personal details she gave her interrogators were false.

Zhao was held at the police headquarters in Harbin, where she was tortured but revealed no information. A Japanese military record noted that she did not confess even under prolonged electric torture. The Japanese then sent her to a hospital in Harbin for treatment in the hope of obtaining a confession, and she refused to have her leg amputated so that she could return to combat. In the hospital, she won over a guard, Dong Xianxun, and a nurse, Han Yongyi, who helped her escape on 28 June 1936. She was recaptured three days later and subjected to harsher interrogation.

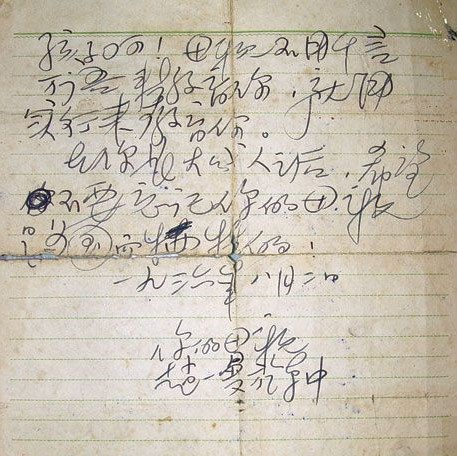
Zhao's letter to her son

After about nine months of imprisonment, the Japanese decided to send Zhao back to Zhuhe to be executed. Early on 2 August 1936, on the train to Zhuhe, she wrote a farewell letter of more than 160 characters to her son. The letter states, "I hope you will not forget that your mother sacrificed herself for the nation." She was executed in Zhuhe later that day. She is said to have sung a revolutionary song as she approached the execution ground and to have died shouting anti-Japanese slogans.

== Family ==
Zhao was survived by her husband Chen Dabang and their son Chen Yexian, known as Ning'er, who grew up not knowing his mother's true identity. After 1949, her husband, son and sister Li Kunjie searched for her, and with the help of an old photograph, a journalist identified Zhao Yiman as Li Kuntai. While searching for his mother, her son was moved by the 1950 film about Zhao, and her farewell letter, which had been recorded in Japanese interrogation files, reached the family more than 20 years after her death. Chen Yexian copied the letter at the Northeast Martyrs Memorial Hall and had the name "Zhao Yiman" tattooed on his arm. Her granddaughter Chen Hong keeps the letter as a family heirloom and has spoken about her at schools in Sichuan.

== Memorials ==
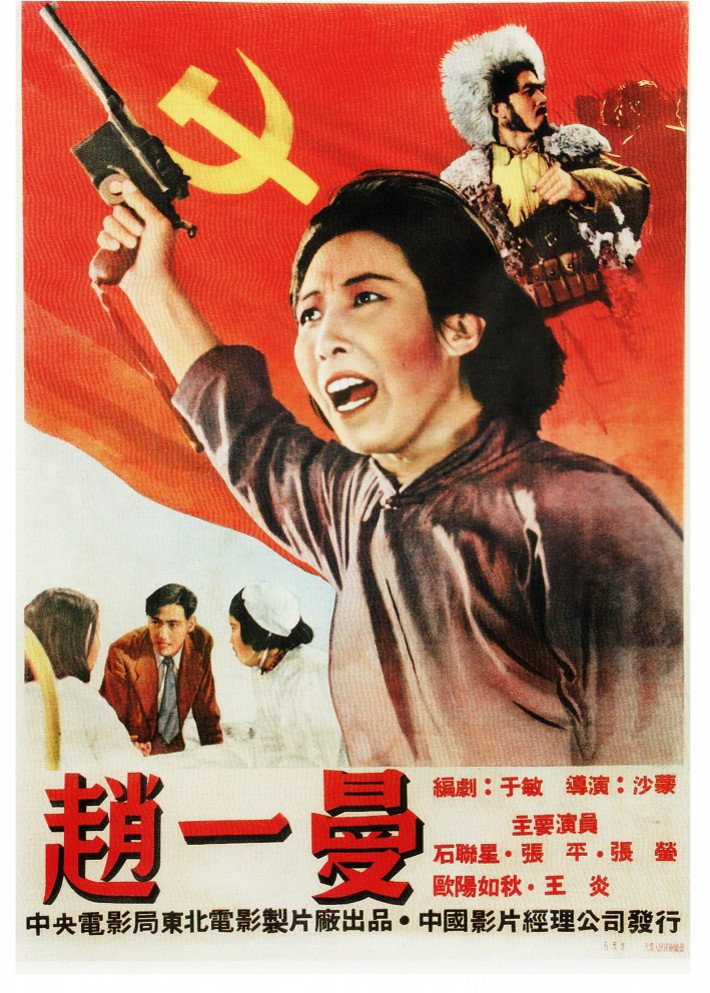
Poster of the 1950 film Zhao Yiman, starring Shi Lianxing

Zhao's experiences are portrayed in textbooks and museums, as well as in films and comics. In 2009, she was named one of the 100 heroes who made outstanding contributions to the founding of the People's Republic of China. In 2014, the Ministry of Civil Affairs included her in its first list of famous martyrs of the war against Japan.

The former police headquarters in Harbin where Zhao was held now houses the Northeast Martyrs Memorial Hall, and Harbin named a 2,375-metre (1.476 mi) street, Yiman Street, after her. In Yibin, a memorial hall to her stands on Cuiping Mountain, and a park, a village, an avenue and a middle school bear her name. In 1989, the Party History Office and the All-China Women's Federation of Yibin published a biography of her.

The 1950 film Zhao Yiman depicts her work as a political mobilizer of workers and peasants in occupied Manchuria and her execution by the Japanese in 1936. The 2005 film My Mother Zhao Yiman was based on her son's memory of her. Unlike the 1950 film, it includes flashbacks to Zhao's earlier years and is narrated by the character of her son. Her life has also been adapted for television and the stage.
