= Ma Shouyu =

Chinese politician (1908–1977)

- 马守愚

Personal details
- Born: 1908 Tai'an County, Shandong Province, Qing Dynasty, China
- Died: 1977 (aged 68–69)
- Party: Chinese Communist Party
- Sex: Male
- Other names: 马励明 马云亭 王振祥

Ma Shouyu
- Simplified Chinese: 马守愚
- Traditional Chinese: 馬守愚
Transcriptions
Standard Mandarin
- Hanyu Pinyin: Mǎ Shǒuyú

Ma Shouyu (simplified Chinese: 马守愚; traditional Chinese: 馬守愚 , 1908 - 1977) was a political figure in the early Chinese Communist Party.

== Early life ==
Ma was born in Tai'an County, Shandong Province.

== Career ==
In 1924, he was admitted to Shandong Provincial First Normal School. He joined the Communist Youth League of China at the school and became a member of the Chinese Communist Party (CCP) the same year. In 1925, the CCP Shandong Provincial Executive Committee sent him to Tai'an, to establish party organizations. Wang Zhongxiu and Yu Zanzhi were sent to Tai'an soon after. They recruited Qin Shaoxiang and Sun Jianlin as party members in Tai'an Railway Station.

In the spring of 1926, these five members had a meeting in a mountain, and established the CCP Tai'an Branch, which belonged to CCP Shandong Provincial Executive Committee. Ma was elected as the secretary, while Yu, Wang and Qin became committee members. Ma went to Qufu the same year to publicize the CCP in the Temple of Confucius. During that summer, the CCP Branch of Shandong Provincial Second Normal School was set up, and Ma was elected to be in charge. Soon after, Ma left and Gong Changfu took this position.

In August, 1927, Wu Guanying, Li Henian and some other members established the CCP Tai'an County Committee under the CCP Shandong Province Committee. Ma served as the secretary. In 1929, he was arrested by Kuomintang and sentenced for 6 months in prison. After his release, he went to Shanghai, and the CCP Central Committee assigned him to Northeast China to preside over the work of the CCP Manchurian Provincial Committee. As soon as he arrived there, he rebuilt the Fushun underground party organization together with Yang Jingyu. It went through several disruptions. On August 30, 1929, both were arrested by Kenpeitai due to Fan Qing's report. In 1931, Ma was released. He exited the CCP. The next year, he went to study in Japan and took part in the Chinese Youth Party. After returning to China, he served as a lecturer at Peking Northeastern University. When the Second Sino-Japanese War occurred in 1937, Ma served under Cheng Qian. During the Anti-Rightist Campaign of the CCP in 1957, he was considered to be a rightist.

== Death ==
He died in 1977. In December 1979, Xiangtan Municipal Committee decided to rehabilitate and restore Ma's reputation.
