= Northeastern People's Revolutionary Army =

Chinese anti-Japanese resistance group

- Simplified Chinese: 东北人民革命军
- Traditional Chinese: 東北人民革命軍
Transcriptions
Standard Mandarin
- Hanyu Pinyin: Dōngběi Rénmín Gémìngjūn

After the Empire of Japan invaded and occupied the Northeast in 1931, the Chinese Communist Party organized small anti-Japanese guerrilla units, and formed their own Northeastern People's Revolutionary Army, dedicated to social revolution, but these were dwarfed by the Anti-Japanese Volunteer Armies which had been raised by their anti-Japanese, patriotic appeal.

When the first volunteer armies were organised, the Chinese Communist Party was completely hostile to them on the grounds that their leaders were bound to capitulate, claiming that the leaders of the volunteer armies were paid by the Japanese and merely pretending to resist. In this way, the Japanese Army would have a pretext for bringing its troops up to the Soviet border. Communists in Northeast China even issued an appeal for the volunteers to kill their officers and join the Communists in social revolution.

Some Communists acted against this policy and held senior positions in the volunteer forces. They were particularly influential in the Chinese People's National Salvation Army, where Li Yanlu and Zhou Baozhong were made high-ranking officers. At first, the Party severely criticised their conduct. However, the Communists eventually had to face the fact that their policy made them almost irrelevant to the anti-Japanese cause.

In 1934, after the defeat of the Volunteer Armies, all these Communist Party units were reorganized into the single Northeast Anti-Japanese United Army, with Yang Jingyu as its Commander-in-Chief. This force continued the struggle against the Japanese pacification of Manchukuo until the death of Yang in 1940.
