= Shangzhi =

City in Heilongjiang province, China

Shangzhi 尚志市
- County-level city

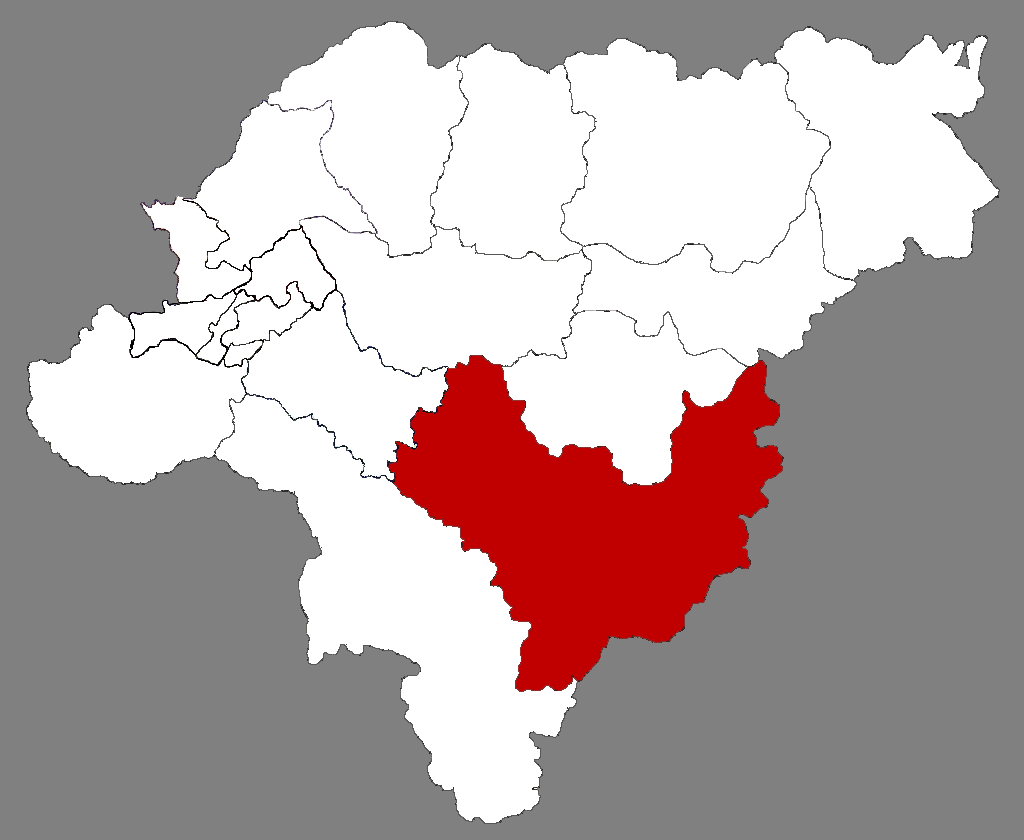
- Location of Shangzhi in Harbin

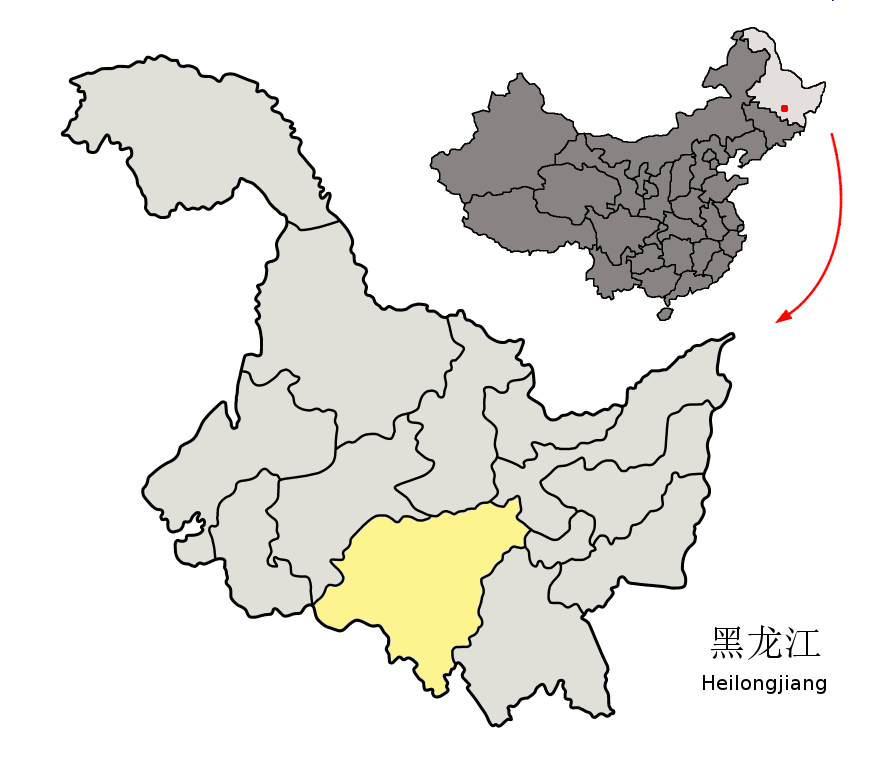
- Harbin in Heilongjiang
- Coordinates: 45°12′25″N 127°57′54″E
- Country: People's Republic of China
- Province: Heilongjiang
- Sub-provincial city: Harbin
- Divisions: 10 towns; 7 townships
- Seat: Shangzhi Town (尚志镇)

Area
  - Total: 8,824.9 km^{2} (3,407.3 sq mi)

Population (2018)
  - Total: 560,448
  - Density: 63.508/km^{2} (164.48/sq mi)
- Time zone: UTC+8 (China Standard)
- Postal code: 1506XX
- Area code: 0451
- Climate: Dwb
- Website: www.shangzhi.gov.cn

Shangzhi (Chinese: 尚志; pinyin: Shàngzhì) is a county-level city under the jurisdiction of Harbin, the capital of Heilongjiang province, People's Republic of China. It is 127 kilometres (79 mi) away from central Harbin and has an area of approximately 9,000 km^{2} (3,500 sq mi). The city proper has a population of around 120,000, while the total administrative population is approximately 600,000 inhabitants. The most spacious county-level division of Harbin City, it borders Yanshou County to the north, Wuchang to the southwest, Acheng District to the northwest, and Bin County to the northwest, as well as the prefecture-level city of Mudanjiang to the southeast.

The city of Shangzhi was once called Zhuhe (珠河; Zhūhé). It was developed during the Guangxu era in the late Qing dynasty, and was renamed to Shangzhi to commemorate the Second Sino-Japanese War hero Zhao Shangzhi in 1946.

The most famous place in Shangzhi is the Yabuli (simplified Chinese: 亚布力; traditional Chinese: 亞布力; pinyin: Yàbùlì) Skiing Centre -

== Climate ==
Shangzhi has a monsoon-influenced hot summer humid continental climate (Köppen Dwa), with long, very dry, bitterly cold winters, very warm and humid summers, and short, rather dry spring and autumn in between. The monthly 24-hour average temperature ranges from −18.7 °C (−1.7 °F) in January to 22.6 °C (72.7 °F) in July, and the annual mean is +3.42 °C (38.2 °F). Close to three-fourths of the annual precipitation occurs from June to September. With monthly percent possible sunshine ranging from 49% in July to 63% in March, the city receives 2,450 hours of bright sunshine annually.

Climate data for Shangzhi, elevation 190 m (620 ft), (1991–2020 normals, extremes 1971–present)
Month	Jan	Feb	Mar	Apr	May	Jun	Jul	Aug	Sep	Oct	Nov	Dec	Year
Record high °C (°F)	3.9 (39.0)	8.7 (47.7)	18.8 (65.8)	29.0 (84.2)	34.3 (93.7)	38.3 (100.9)	35.4 (95.7)	35.0 (95.0)	29.7 (85.5)	26.9 (80.4)	19.6 (67.3)	8.3 (46.9)	38.3 (100.9)
Mean daily maximum °C (°F)	−11.6 (11.1)	−6.0 (21.2)	2.7 (36.9)	13.3 (55.9)	20.6 (69.1)	25.7 (78.3)	27.7 (81.9)	26.2 (79.2)	21.3 (70.3)	12.4 (54.3)	0.1 (32.2)	−9.8 (14.4)	10.2 (50.4)
Daily mean °C (°F)	−18.7 (−1.7)	−13.7 (7.3)	−3.8 (25.2)	6.5 (43.7)	14.0 (57.2)	19.8 (67.6)	22.6 (72.7)	20.9 (69.6)	14.4 (57.9)	5.5 (41.9)	−5.7 (21.7)	−15.8 (3.6)	3.8 (38.9)
Mean daily minimum °C (°F)	−24.5 (−12.1)	−20.7 (−5.3)	−10.1 (13.8)	0.0 (32.0)	7.3 (45.1)	14.4 (57.9)	18.2 (64.8)	16.5 (61.7)	8.5 (47.3)	−0.1 (31.8)	−10.7 (12.7)	−21.1 (−6.0)	−1.9 (28.6)
Record low °C (°F)	−40.9 (−41.6)	−44.1 (−47.4)	−37.2 (−35.0)	−16.8 (1.8)	−5.8 (21.6)	2.2 (36.0)	7.7 (45.9)	3.2 (37.8)	−6.1 (21.0)	−18.8 (−1.8)	−32.2 (−26.0)	−39.8 (−39.6)	−44.1 (−47.4)
Average precipitation mm (inches)	6.3 (0.25)	7.5 (0.30)	17 (0.7)	29.2 (1.15)	63.9 (2.52)	97.7 (3.85)	160.1 (6.30)	149.3 (5.88)	61.4 (2.42)	35.2 (1.39)	22.7 (0.89)	12.6 (0.50)	662.9 (26.15)
Average precipitation days (≥ 0.1 mm)	6.7	5.3	7.5	8.9	12.7	13.7	14.8	13.8	10.0	8.3	8.2	9.0	118.9
Average snowy days	10.2	7.6	9.2	3.3	0.1	0	0	0	0.1	2.5	9.8	12.3	55.1
Average relative humidity (%)	74	70	64	59	64	72	81	83	78	70	71	75	72
Mean monthly sunshine hours	164.4	189.2	224.2	220.9	243.9	248.3	228.7	220.5	226.1	187.7	148.7	144.2	2,446.8
Percentage possible sunshine	58	64	60	54	53	53	49	51	61	56	53	53	55
Source 1: China Meteorological Administration All-time May Record
Source 2: Weather China

== Administrative divisions ==
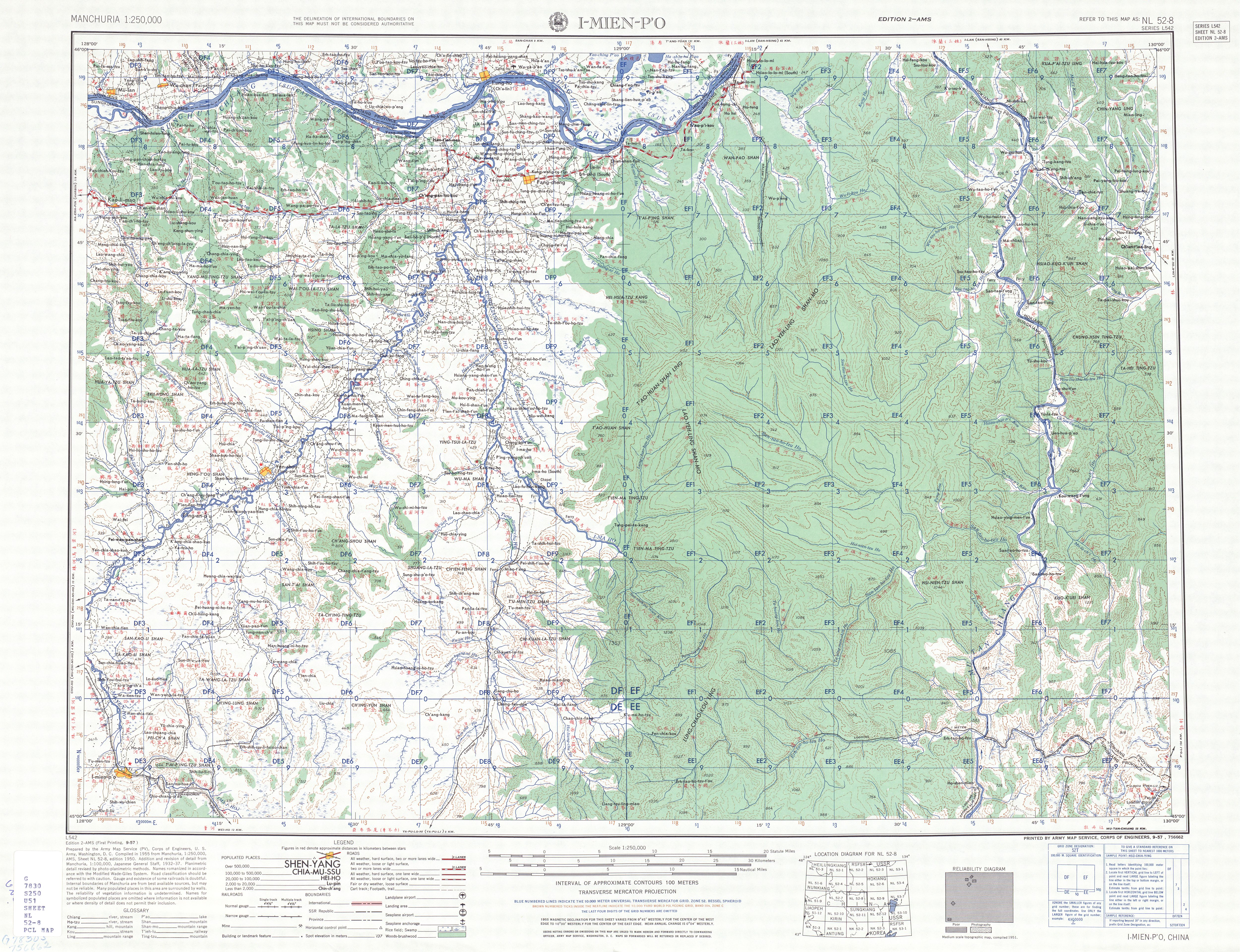
Map including Yimianpo (labeled as I-mien-p'o 一靣坡) (AMS, 1955)

Shangzhi is divided into 10 towns and seven townships:

=== Towns ===
- Shangzhi Town (尚志镇)
- Yabuli (亚布力镇)
- Weihe (苇河镇)
- Yimianpo (一面坡镇)
- Mao'ershan (帽儿山镇)
- Qingyang (庆阳镇)
- Lianghe (亮河镇)
- Shitouhezi (石头河子镇)
- Yuanbao (元宝镇)
- Heilonggong (黑龙宫镇)

=== Townships ===
- Zhenzhushan Township (珍珠山乡)
- Laojieji Township (老街基乡)
- Mayan Township (马延乡)
- Changshou Township (长寿乡)
- Wujimi Township (乌吉密乡)
- Hedong Township (河东乡)
- Yuchi Korean Ethnic Township (鱼池朝鲜族乡)

== Notable people ==
- Liu Qing, captain of Women's Basketball National Team in the 1980s.
- Yu Wenxia, singer and Miss World 2012.
- Zhao Shangzhi, Commander of the Northeast Anti-Japan United Army during World War II and namesake of this city. A well-known national hero who devoted his life to the Northeastern struggle against Japanese occupation. He was captured and beheaded after a traitor leaked his whereabouts to the Japanese.
- Zhao Yiman, a well-known national heroine who was killed by the Japanese invaders because she refused to leak the secrets about communist operations.
