= Hedong Township, Heilongjiang =

Hedong Township 河东乡 하동향
- Ethnic township
- Location in Heilongjiang Hedong (China)
- Coordinates: 45°15′29″N 128°02′25″E
- Country: People's Republic of China
- Province: Heilongjiang
- Sub-provincial city: Harbin
- County-level city: Shangzhi
- Village-level divisions: 9 villages

Area
  - Total: 12 km^{2} (4.6 sq mi)
- Elevation: 189 m (620 ft)

Population
  - Total: 14,019
  - Density: 1,200/km^{2} (3,000/sq mi)
- Time zone: UTC+8 (China Standard)
- Area code: 0451

Hedong Township (simplified Chinese: 河东乡; traditional Chinese: 河東鄉; pinyin: Hédōng Xiāng; lit. 'river east'), formerly known as Hedong Korean Ethnic Township (simplified Chinese: 河东朝鲜族乡; traditional Chinese: 河東朝鮮族鄉; pinyin: Hédōng Cháoxiǎnzú Xiāng; Korean: 하동조선족향), is a township under the administration and in the northeastern suburbs of Shangzhi in southern Heilongjiang province, China, located 8 kilometres (5.0 mi) from downtown. As of 2018, it has nine villages under its administration.
