= Weihe, Heilongjiang =

Weihe 苇河镇
- Town
- Location in Heilongjiang Weihe (China)
- Coordinates: 44°57′25″N 128°22′58″E
- Country: People's Republic of China
- Province: Heilongjiang
- Sub-provincial city: Harbin
- County-level city: Shangzhi

Area
  - Total: 610 km^{2} (240 sq mi)
- Elevation: 247 m (810 ft)

Population
  - Total: 45,077
  - Density: 74/km^{2} (190/sq mi)
- Time zone: UTC+8 (China Standard Time)
- Postal code: 150623

Weihe (simplified Chinese: 苇河; traditional Chinese: 葦河; pinyin: Wěihé) is a town in southern Heilongjiang province, China, located just off of G10 Suifenhe–Manzhouli Expressway, 44 km (27 mi) from Shangzhi, which administers it. Its total population is 45,077, residing in an area of 610 km^{2} (240 sq mi). As of 2018, It has 3 residential communities (社区) and 13 villages under its administration.

== See also ==
- List of township-level divisions of Heilongjiang
