= 88th Separate Rifle Brigade =

1942–1945 Soviet military unit in China

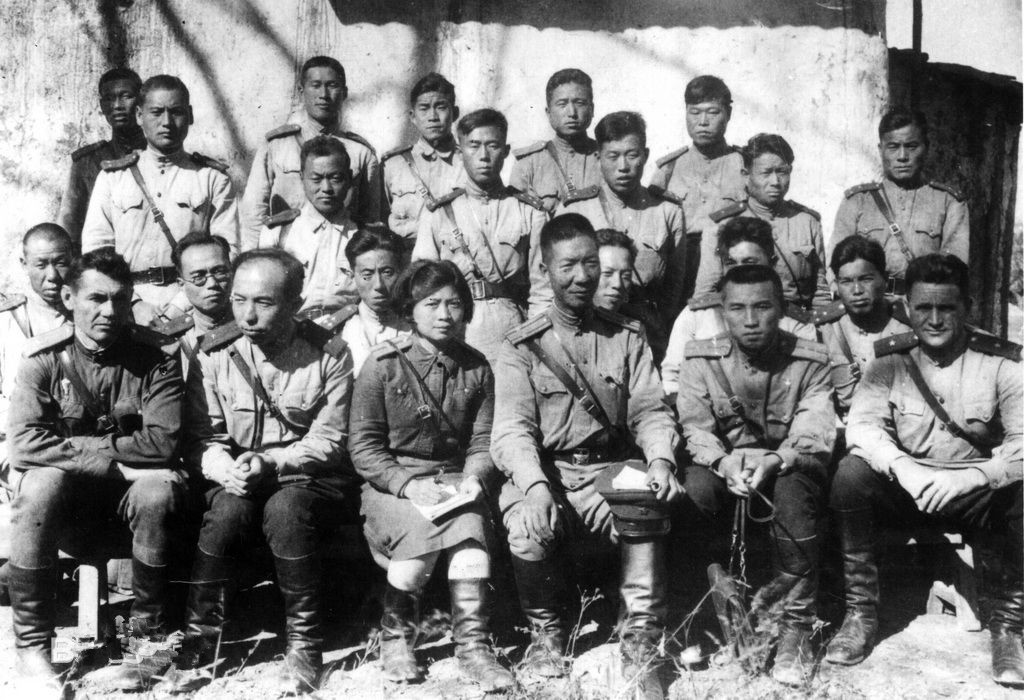
- Soldiers of the 88th Separate Rifle Brigade.
- Active: 22 July 1942 – 12 October 1945
- Country: Soviet Union
- Allegiance: Korea; Chinese Communist Party
- Branch: Soviet Army
- Type: Foreign volunteer
- Role: Infantry
- Nickname: Military Unit 8461
- Engagements: World War II; Soviet–Japanese War; Soviet occupation of northern Korea

Commanders
- Notable commanders: Major General Zhou Baozhong

The 88th Separate Rifle Brigade (Russian: 88-я отдельная стрелковая бригада, Korean: 제88독립보병여단, Chinese: 苏联远东方面军独立第88步兵旅), also known as the Northeast Anti-Japanese Allied Forces Teaching Brigade or the 88th International Brigade, was an international military unit of the Red Army created during World War II. It was unique in that it incorporated the peoples of Korea, China, and Soviet Central Asia in its ranks.

== History ==
This unit was founded on 22 July 1942, to accommodate the remaining forces of the Northeast Anti-Japanese United Army, who were exiled to the Soviet Union after being driven by the Imperial Japanese Army to Manchuria during the war. The brigade was replenished with Soviet citizens of Chinese and Korean descent, reaching around 1,500 people. Although it was a Soviet military unit, it kept its original organization that existed in the NAJUA. Located in the Far East, it was under the control of the Soviet 25th Army. Chinese Lieutenant Colonel Zhou Baozhong was the first commander. The brigade was made up of Chinese and Koreans, deployed in camps "A" and "B" in the suburbs of Kerki in the Turkmen SSR. Captain Kim Song-ju, later known as Kim Il Sung, took command of the 1st Korean Battalion. The brigade was stationed in the village of Vyatskoye on the Amur River in Khabarovsk Krai. In 1943, General Iosif Apanasenko gave the brigade its official unit number. The brigade was never put into combat, as it was to fulfill only intelligence-sabotage tasks against Japan, with small armed groups transferred to Manchuria and Korea. In addition to intelligence and sabotage training, they underwent intensive ideological training. After a reorganization in April 1944, the brigade consisted of the following:

- HQ
- Political unit
- Counterintelligence unit (SMERSH)
- 4 independent rifle battalions
- Machine gun battalion
- Artillery squadron
- Mortar company
- Reconnaissance company
- Sapper company
- Automobile company
- Rear services
- Intelligence course

In mid-1945, the brigade was directly subordinated to the staff of the 5th Rifle Corps of the newly-formed 2nd Far Eastern Front. In July 1945, the brigade command developed a plan to attack a separate 100-strong detachment in Manchuria, but it was not implemented. The unit also failed to enter any major combat on August 9, when the Red Army invasion of Manchuria began, leaving the 88th in the 25th Army's reserve. As a result, the brigade commander sent an unsuccessful request to the front commander, General Maksim Purkayev, for a transfer to the hostilities. By the end of August, the unit had liberated many villages in North East China. The brigade was officially disbanded on 12 October 1945. The ethnic Chinese returned to China to fight in the Chinese Civil War, whereas the Koreans were transported to Northern Korea to serve as part of the Provisional People's Committee of North Korea. Many members of the unit went on to serve in the Korean People's Army.

== Notable members ==
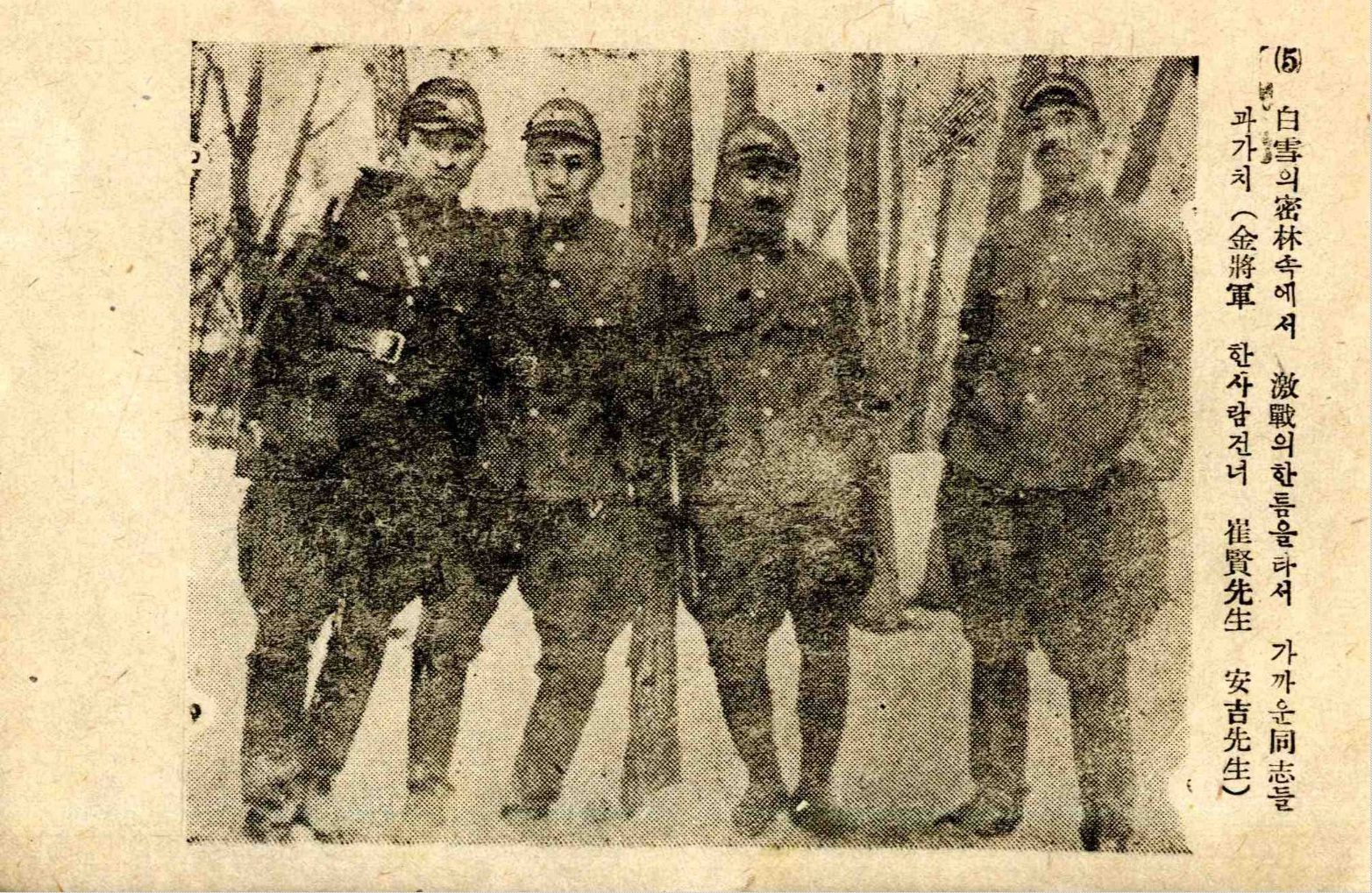
Kim Il Sung and his fellow soldiers in the Soviet 88th Brigade

Notable members have included:

- Kim Il Sung
- Lim Chum-chu
- Kim Chaek
- Choe Hyon
- Ri Yong-suk
- Choe Yong-gon
- Ri Tu-ik

== Decorated fighters ==
Ten fighters of the 88th Brigade, including the brigade commander and battalion commander Kim Il Sung, were awarded the Order of the Red Banner. Others were awarded the following awards:

- 45 - Order of the Red Star
- 51 - Medal "For Courage"
- 149 - Medal "For Military Merit"
- All the personnel of the international brigade were awarded the Medal "For the Victory over Japan".

== Legacy ==
There are heritage sites located on the territory of the Khabarovsk Krai dedicated to the brigade. A burial site is located on the territory of the Khabarovsk Municipal District on a road leading to the village of Vyatskoye. A copy of the military banner of the brigade is kept in Vladivostok, next to a copy of the Victory Banner.

== See also ==
- National military formations of the Red Army
