= Choe Yong-gon =

Choe Yong-gon may refer to:

- Choe Yong-gon (official), 1900–1976), Korean and North Korean military leader
- Choe Yong-gon (vice-premier), born c. 1952, possibly died 2015), North Korean politician
