= Yang Jingyu =

Chinese military commander and political commissar (1905–1940)

Martyr Yang Jingyu
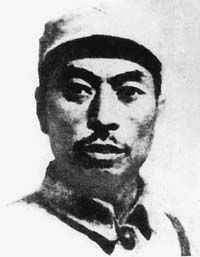
- Born: Ma Shangde; February 13, 1905; Queshan, Henan Province, Qing China
- Died: February 23, 1940 (aged 35); Mengjiang County (present-day Jingyu County), Jilin, Manchukuo
- Burial place: Yang Jingyu Martyr Mausoleum
- Military career
- Allegiance: Communist China
- Branch: Northeast Anti-Japanese United Army
- Unit: First Route Army

Chinese name
- Simplified Chinese: 杨靖宇
- Traditional Chinese: 楊靖宇
Transcriptions
Standard Mandarin
- Hanyu Pinyin: Yáng Jìngyǔ
- Wade–Giles: Yang^{2} Ching^{4}-yü^{3}

Birth name
- Simplified Chinese: 马尚德
- Traditional Chinese: 馬尚德
Transcriptions
Standard Mandarin
- Hanyu Pinyin: Mǎ Shàngdé
- Wade–Giles: Ma^{3} Shang^{4}-te^{2}

Yang Jingyu (February 13, 1905 – February 23, 1940), born Ma Shangde, was a Chinese communist, military commander and political commissar who led the First Route Army of the Northeast Anti-Japanese United Army during the Second Sino-Japanese War. His troops waged a guerrilla war against Japanese forces in Manchukuo (Manchuria) who were attempting to suppress resistance in the region.

== Early life and education ==
Yang was born Ma Shangde in 1905 into a farming family in Queshan County, Henan. In 1923, he entered a textile and dyeing industrial school in Kaifeng, where he began to study Marxism. In June 1925, he joined the Communist Youth League. He joined the Chinese Communist Party in 1927, although a 2021 Xinhua profile gives the year as 1926.

== Revolutionary career ==
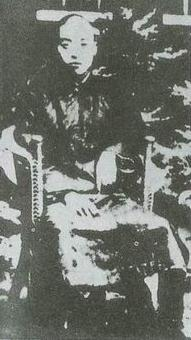
Yang Jingyu at home in Queshan, 1926.

In April 1927, Yang led a peasant uprising in Queshan, and he led several other peasant uprisings in his home region. In the autumn of 1928, he went to Kaifeng and Luoyang to carry out underground work for the party.

In the spring of 1929, Yang was sent to Northeast China, where he became secretary of the party's special branch in Fushun and organized a workers' movement. During his years of underground work, he was arrested five times and tortured, and he later said that he had attended two universities, the "university of society" and the "university of prison". After the Mukden Incident of September 1931, he became secretary of the party's Harbin Municipal Committee and acting secretary of the military committee of its Manchuria Provincial Committee. In the Northeast, he worked under the alias Zhang Guanyi, and in 1932, he adopted the name Yang Jingyu.

== Military career ==
In the autumn of 1932, the Manchuria Provincial Committee sent Yang to southern Manchuria, to the areas of Panshi, Hailong and Liuhe in Jilin. There he organized the South Manchuria Guerrilla Unit of the 32nd Army of the Chinese Red Army, serving as its political commissar, and established a base centered on Hongshilazi in Panshi. With the support of local people, the guerrillas set up a hospital, a uniform factory and a newspaper at the base. In September 1933, he became commander and political commissar of the 1st Independent Division of the First Army of the Northeastern People's Revolutionary Army. In 1934, he brought 17 anti-Japanese armed groups together under a joint headquarters, of which he became commander-in-chief, and that year he became commander and political commissar of the First Army.

Facing much stronger forces, Yang set up numerous secret camps in the forests and relied on mountain guerrilla warfare. He ordered his troops not to fight battles that would harm the local population, shared captured supplies with residents, and compared the army to a lamp wick and the people to the oil without which it could not burn. He also required the party to establish branches at company level.

=== First Route Army ===
In June 1936, Yang became commander and political commissar of the First Army of the Northeast Anti-Japanese United Army, and in July 1936, he became commander-in-chief and political commissar of its First Route Army. He composed the First Route Army's anthem. After his forces won a victory at Motianling in 1936, the Japanese authorities forcibly relocated villages, imposed collective responsibility under the baojia system, restricted the movement of food into the mountains and offered a bounty of 20,000 yuan for his head.

From the second half of 1937, the United Army lost contact with the party's higher organizations, and Yang rejected proposals to withdraw to the Soviet Union or deeper into the Changbai Mountains, arguing that the people would lose hope if the army left. A plenary session of the party's Central Committee praised him as a model of struggle who had fought the enemy for more than seven years amid ice and snow. The defection of Cheng Bin, a division commander of the First Army, who helped the Japanese destroy more than 70 of the army's secret camps, left Yang's forces short of supplies. In the autumn and winter of 1939, Yang and Wei Zhengmin divided their troops into small groups to continue guerrilla operations.

=== Final campaign and death ===
Japanese and Manchukuo archives record at least 47 battles fought by Yang's forces in the more than 100 days from late October 1939 to his death. In early 1940, after his unit was surrounded, Yang, recognizing that he was the enemy's main target, repeatedly ordered his comrades to break out in separate groups. On 18 February 1940, the last two soldiers with him were killed, and he continued alone for five days and nights.

On 23 February 1940, Yang, who had not eaten for days, gave money to woodcutters near Mengjiang County to buy him food and cotton shoes, and one of them informed the authorities. According to a secret report by the Japanese-led border police dated March 16, 1940, which the Heilongjiang Provincial Archives released in 2025, villagers from Baoan reported him to the Mengjiang police at about 3:00 pm, and 15 Japanese and Manchukuo police officers found him on high ground at about 4:00 pm and pursued him. He refused repeated demands to surrender, reportedly declaring that he was Chinese and could not surrender to the Japanese invaders. He was shot in the chest by machine-gun fire and was killed at 4:30 pm, about 5 kilometres (3.1 mi) southwest of the Mengjiang county seat, at the age of 35. The police found on his body a Mauser pistol, two Colt pistols, 6,660 yuan in cash, a notebook and a watch.

The Japanese beheaded Yang and had his body dissected, and his stomach was found to contain no grain, only undigested grass roots, tree bark and cotton wadding. Kishitani Ryūichirō, the police chief of Tonghua Province, was reportedly struck by his resolve. A Japanese translation of Yang's notebook, the original of which is lost, survives in the Tonghua Municipal Archives, which released it in 2025.

== Commemoration ==
In 1946, Mengjiang County was renamed Jingyu County in Yang's honor. In 1949, Guo Moruo wrote a poem commemorating him. On 23 February 1958, Yang's head and body were buried together at the Jingyu Mausoleum in Tonghua, Jilin, and the Central Committee, the State Council, Mao Zedong, Liu Shaoqi, Zhou Enlai and Zhu De sent wreaths. In 2014, the Ministry of Civil Affairs included him in its first list of 300 famous martyrs of the war against Japan.

Yang's death site in Jingyu County is marked by a monument, and the Yang Jingyu Martyrs' Cemetery in Tonghua honors him as one of five commanders of the United Army whose heads were severed by the Japanese. The Yang Jingyu Cadre Institute, near the cemetery, opened in 2021. In his hometown, Zhumadian has built a square with his statue, restored his former residence and renovated a memorial hall to him. Streets and schools in China are named after him. The historian Patrick Fuliang Shan has examined Yang's place in Chinese collective memory and hero worship.

== Personal life ==
In 1928, Yang left his wife and two young children to carry out revolutionary work, and he never saw them again. His grandson Ma Jizhi, a retired train driver who moved from Henan to Jilin, keeps a piece of birch bark that his parents recovered from the site of Yang's death.
