= Northeast Anti-Japanese United Army =

1936–1945 Chinese-Korean militia

- 東北抗日聯軍
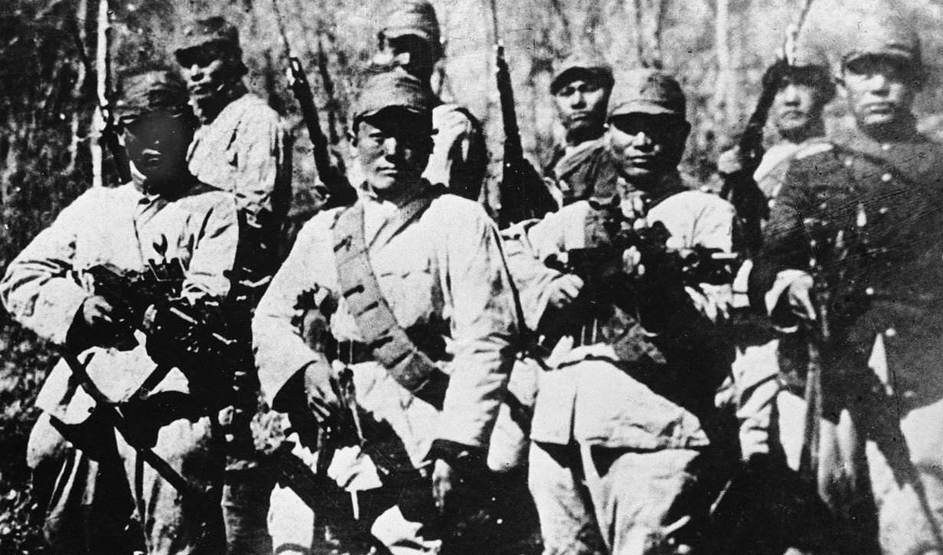
- Soldiers of the Northeast Anti-Japanese United Army
- Active: 1936–1945
- Country: Manchukuo; China
- Allegiance: Chinese Communist Party (nominally); Communist International
- Type: Volunteer army
- Role: Guerrilla warfare
- Engagements: Second Sino-Japanese War, Soviet invasion of Manchuria

Commanders
- Notable commanders: Yang Jingyu, Li Zhaolin, Zhou Baozhong, Zhao Shangzhi, Kim Il Sung

Insignia
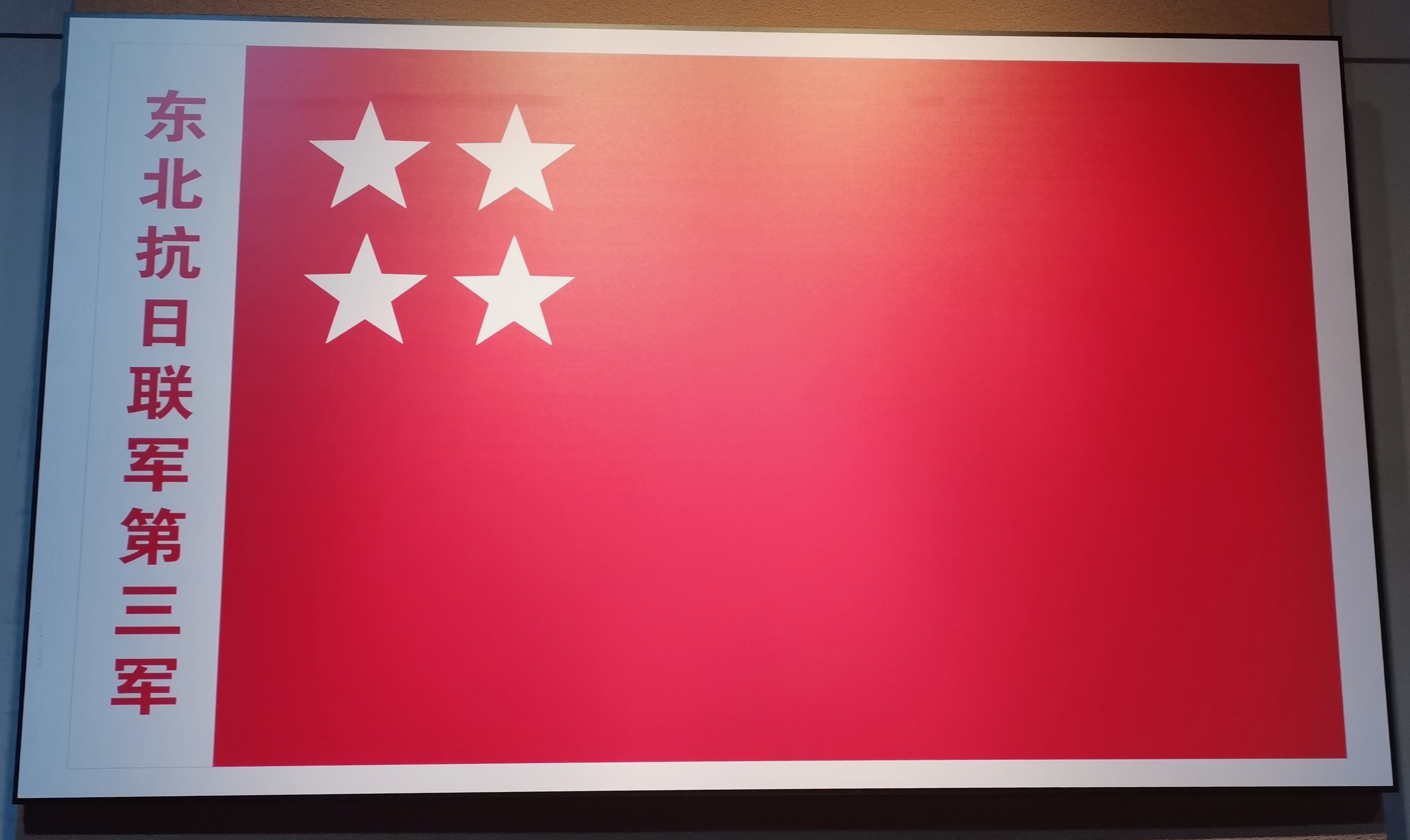
- Flag of the NAJUA 3rd Army

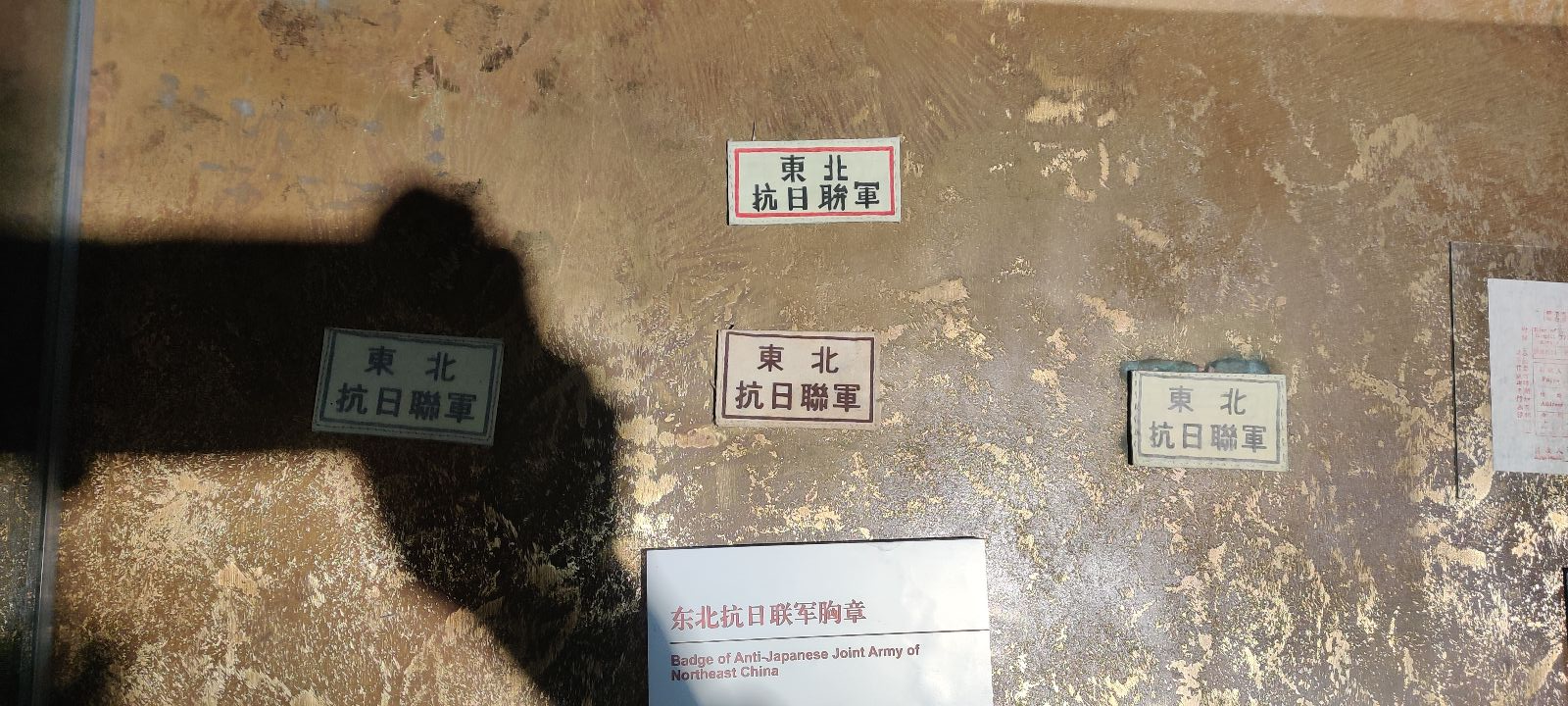
- Patch

Northeast Anti-Japanese United Army

Chinese name
- Traditional Chinese: 東北抗日聯軍
- Simplified Chinese: 东北抗日联军
Transcriptions
Standard Mandarin
- Hanyu Pinyin: Dōngběi Kàngrì Liánjūn
- Wade–Giles: Tung-pei K'ang-jih Lien-chün

Korean name
- Hangul: 동북항일연군 동북항일련군
- Hanja: 東北抗日聯軍
Transcriptions
- Revised Romanization: Dongbuk hangil yeongun Dongbuk hangil ryeongun
- McCune–Reischauer: Tongbuk hangil yŏn'gun Tongbuk hangil ryŏn'gun

The Northeast Anti-Japanese United Army, also known as the NAJUA, Northeast United Resistance Army or Northeast Anti-Japanese United Army, was the main Anti-Japanese guerrilla army in Northeast China (Manchuria) after the Japanese invasion of Manchuria in 1931. Its predecessors were various anti-Japanese volunteer armies organized by locals and the Manchuria branches of the Chinese Communist Party (CCP). In February 1936, the CCP, in accordance with the instructions of the Communist International, issued The Declaration of the Unified Organization of Northeast Anti-Japanese United Army and marked the official formation of the organization.

== Formation ==
=== Predecessors ===
After the Mukden Incident of 1931, the people of Liaoning, Jilin, and Heilongjiang provinces began to organize guerrilla forces to join anti-Japanese Volunteer Armies and carry out guerrilla warfare against the Kwantung Army and the forces of Manchukuo. The Chinese Communist Party also sent cadres to join the local military struggle. Yang Jingyu joined the guerrilla force in Panshi. Zhou Baozhong united with Wang Detai's force in Yanji. Li Zhaolin was sent from Liaoyang to the county committee of Zhuhe to form a local guerrilla force. Zhao Shangzhi joined the force in Bayan. Choe Yong-gon went to east Jilin to develop party organizations and form guerrillas. Feng Zhongyun was sent to Tangyuan as the representative and inspector of the Manchuria provincial party committee to form guerrillas.

=== Contradictions and the Low Ebb ===
==== The "Northern Conference" ====
In June 1932, the Chinese Communist Party convened the "Northern Conference" (the northern provincial committee secretaries meeting) in Shanghai. They criticized the "particularity" of Manchuria proposed by the Manchuria provincial party committee and decided that the Northeast should focus on the agrarian revolution to seize land from the landlords, form Red armies, and establish Soviet government. As a result, guerrilla forces led by communists were ordered by the Manchuria provincial party committee to be rearranged as Red armies and to fight independently.

==== The "Letter of January 26" ====
In early 1933, the CCP central committee was moved from Shanghai to Jiangxi Soviet. At this period, the Manchuria provincial committee was led by both the CCP's delegation to the Comintern and the branch of the central committee in Shanghai.

In January 1933, the CCP's delegation to the Comintern issued "the Letter of January 26" under the name of the central committee. The letter called to correct the "leftist problem" caused by the Northern Conference. It proposed to establish an anti-Japanese united front instead of focusing on an agrarian revolution. The Red armies were renamed as the Northeast People's Revolutionary Army and were urged to cooperate with other anti-Japanese forces to establish the anti-Japanese united front.

==== The "Letter of February 22" ====
In February 1934, the temporary Politburo of the CCP in Shanghai criticized the Manchuria provincial committee in the "Letter of February 22" for its "rightist mistake" to misinterpret the Letter of January 26. The letter pointed out the danger of "leader's collusion instead of people's united front" and requested to put forward the slogan to go to the stage of agrarian revolution. At the same time, the CCP's delegation to the Comintern also took a series of measures in its organization to try to eliminate the influence of the Letter of February 22. Cadres were sent back from the USSR to Manchuria to make clear instructions and future tasks of the united front.

==== The Official Formation of the NAJUA ====
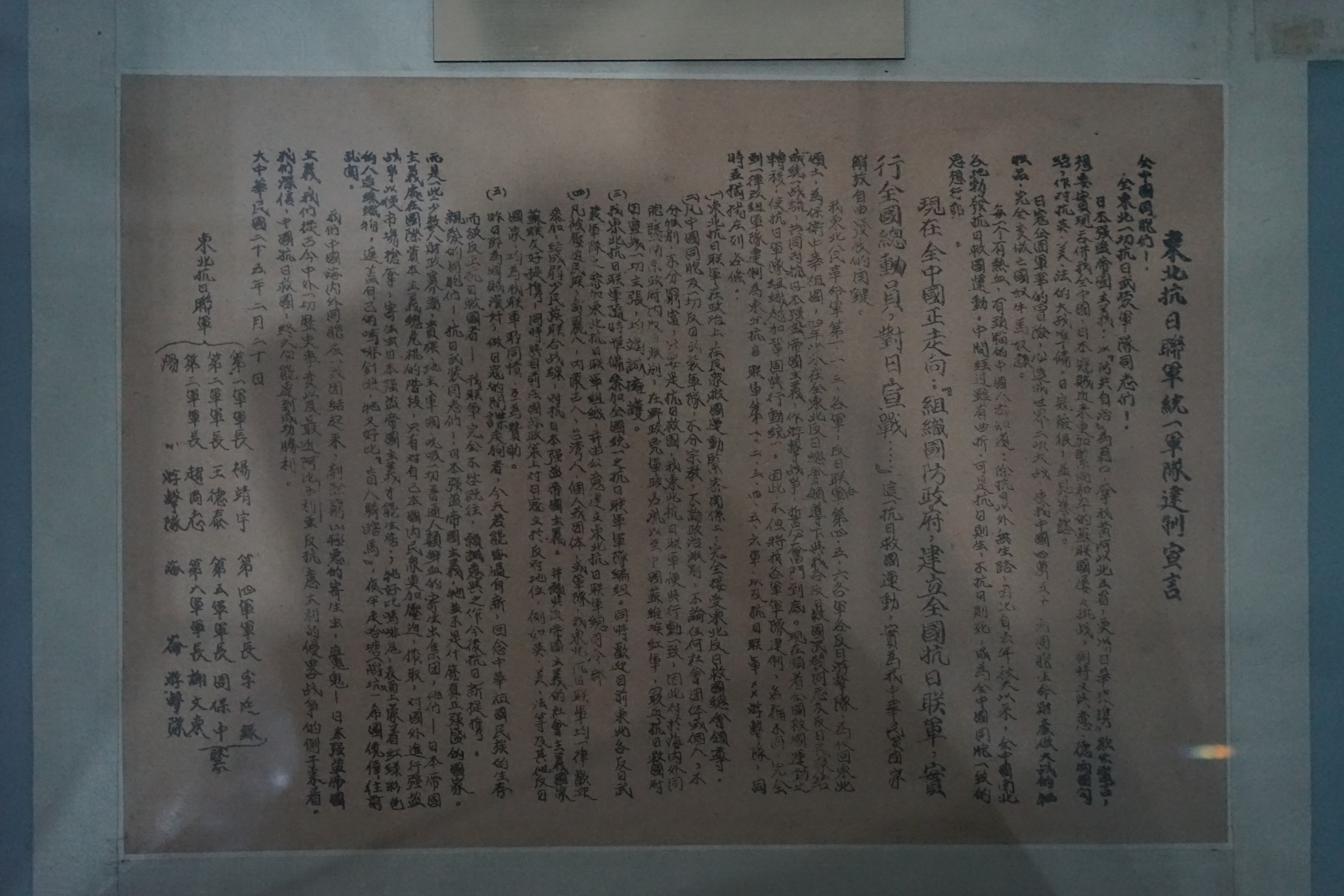
Unified system declaration

From March 1934 to February 1935, the temporary Politburo of the CCP in Shanghai was severely damaged in several anti-communist campaigns and stopped its activities in July. And at the time, the CCP central committee was in its Long March. As a result, from the first half of 1935, the Manchuria party organizations were actually under the independent leadership of the delegation to the Comintern.

In June 1935, the CCP's delegation to Comintern issued the "letter of June 3" to the party organization in Manchuria. The letter called for a new policy, that was, the implementation of the all-out anti-Japanese united front, regardless of party, class, or ethnicity. This letter was consistent with the Popular Front against fascism proposed in the Seventh World Congress of the Comintern and the far-reaching anti-Japanese united front promoted in the "August 1 Declaration" of the CCP.

In February 1936, communist leaders, including Yang Jingyu, Li Zhaolin, Zhou Baozhong, Zhao Shangzhi, and Wang Detai, jointly issued the Declaration of the Unified Organization of Northeast Anti-Japanese United Army. The Northeast People's Revolutionary Army was reorganized as the Northeast Anti-Japanese United Army. The Northeast Anti-Japanese United Army was in a stage of development from 1936 to 1937.

== Affiliation ==
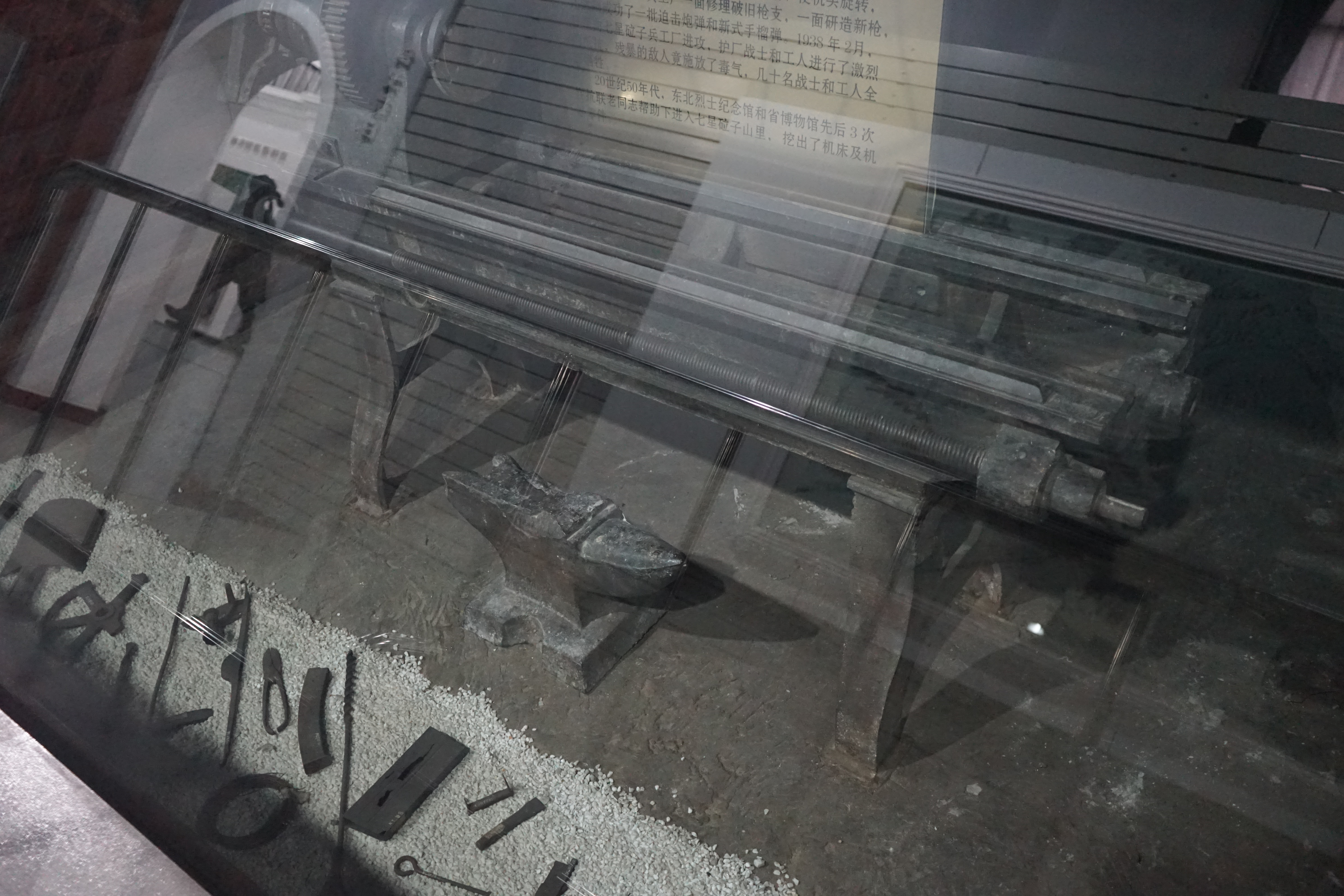
Machine tools for the anti-Japanese coalition arsenal

Officially, this army was led by the Chinese Communist Party. In reality, they did not directly report to the CCP center in Yan'an due to geographical separation. Their only contacts with the CCP in Yan'an were through the CCP representatives in the Communist International, Kang Sheng, and Wang Ming.

They were supported and instructed by the USSR, which supported this army to tie up the forces of its potential Japanese enemy. Their uniforms were copies of the uniform of the Soviet Red Army.

== Components ==
The army was a mixture of various sources, with the same objective: expelling the Japanese from Manchuria. They were communists, students, and peasants, former troops of the warlord Zhang Xueliang, and even bandits. The former bandits played an important role in the guerrilla war by using their skills in the forests and mountains. Most of the high and middle-rank officers had Communist Party membership, including former bandit leaders.

== Koreans in the Northeast Anti-Japanese United Army ==
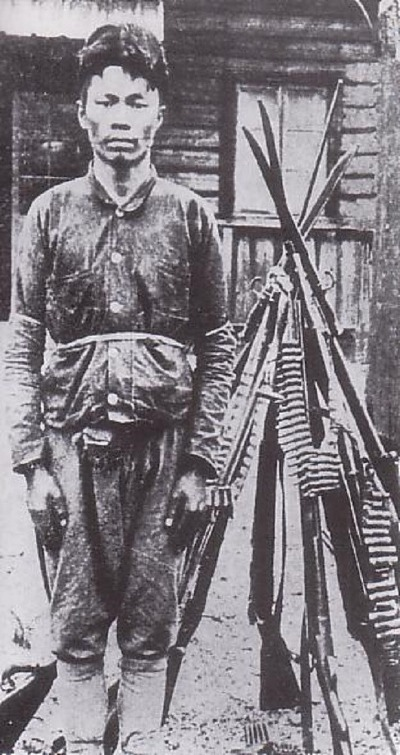
A soldier of Anti-Japanese Volunteer Armies.

The army contained a large number of ethnic Koreans, both the Koreans already settled in Manchuria for generations (Korean Chinese) and Korean refugees newly immigrated from the Korean Peninsula. By 1918, there were virtually no organized armed revolts against Japanese colonisation on the Korean Peninsula. This led many dissident Koreans to choose Manchuria as a place to resist Japanese imperialism in their homelands following the March 1st Movement of 1919 and the later foundation of the Provisional Government of the Republic of Korea. Two of the legendary "Eight Girls Jumping Into the River'' were Korean Chinese. This was a squad of girl guerrillas, aged 13 to 23; after a long firefight with overwhelming Japanese forces who mistook them for a much larger unit, they all jumped into the river, drowning themselves to avoid capture and torture.

Kim Il Sung, later to become the supreme leader of North Korea, was a high-ranking officer in the Northeast Anti-Japanese United Army, and attained a distinction where he crossed the Manchurian-Korean border and attacked a Japanese police station in Pochonbo at 1937. It was widely reported by Korean newspapers such as Donga Ilbo and he became famous in Korea as the most prominent leader of the anti-Japanese movement in the northern half. After the war, some of the Korean nationals in this army became the first generation of the leaders of North Korea. Besides Kim Il Sung, An Gil, Kim Chaek, Choe Yong-gon, and Kang Kon, among others who later became part of North Korea's politics and military forces, were also Korean general officers of the NAJUA.

== Retreat to USSR ==
At the peak of their activities, NAJUA had a force of 50,000 troops. They launched guerrilla warfare in the rear of the Imperial Japanese Army, which was invading mainland China. IJA officers and the Imperial General Staff realized that NAJUA was the main threat to their operations. Together, the IJA, with the Manchukuo army, began to sweep the NAJUA in mid-1930. Like NAJUA, the Manchukuo army included many Korean officers who pledged their loyalty to Japan. Such Korean officers were Park Chung-Hee, Paik Sun-yup, and Chung Il-kwon, who later became full generals in the South Korean Army and (after the May 16 coup) high-ranking officials in the South Korean government. The Manchukuo army also had a special formation, the Gando Special Force (Chinese: 間島特設隊, Korean: 간도특설대), which consisted mainly of Koreans. They assumed the most difficult tasks in combating the NAJUA.

As the offensive of the Japanese army became fierce, NAJUA suffered heavy casualties. Many of their soldiers were dead or taken prisoner. Moreover, Japanese military intelligence allured or tortured NAJUA prisoners to convert to Japan's side. The converted ones assisted the Japanese to attack their ex-comrades. In his autobiography, With the Century (세기와 더불어), Kim Il Sung recalled that such conversions of ex-comrades were more painful than fierce Japanese offensives or the tough climate in Manchuria. By the early 1940s, the NAJUA had been degraded by anti-insurgency campaigns to less than 1,000 men. For these reasons, the NAJUA could not operate effectively in Manchuria any more. By the order of the CCP, the NAJUA relocated its main base to the USSR in 1942. There, they were formally incorporated into the Red Army as the 88th International Brigade, but they kept the organization of NAJUA. Task forces continued to remain in Manchuria for infiltration missions and fought along infiltrated Chinese soldiers from the Soviet Union until the end of the war. The escapees stayed in USSR until the war ended. After Japan surrendered, the Koreans and Chinese went back to their own countries and began revolutionary activities there.

== Contemporary attitudes in the PRC and ROC ==
The Northeast Anti-Japanese United Army remains highly regarded in mainland China. The army is generally viewed as a CCP-led anti-Japanese force. A Chinese Communist leader, Peng Zhen, compared the extreme hardship suffered by the army with the Long March.

Besides legendary commanders Yang Jingyu and Zhao Shangzhi, a female officer called Zhao Yiman (1905–1936) was also revered by many Chinese as a symbol of national salvation.

== See also ==
- Anti-Japanese resistance volunteers in China
- Chinese Red Army
- Chinese Soviet Republic
- Communist International
- Eighth Route Army
- Japanese imperialism
- Korean independence movement
  - List of militant Korean independence activist organizations
- New Fourth Army
