= 6th Central People's Committee =

- State Emblem of North Korea

15 December 1977 – 5 April 1982 (4 years, 111 days) Overview
- Type: Session of the Central People's Committee
- Election: 1st Session of the 6th Supreme People's Assembly

Leadership
- President: Kim Il Sung
- First Vice President: Kim Il
- Vice President: Kang Yang-uk; Pak Song-chol
- Secretary-General: Yim Chun-chu

Members
- Total: 15

The 6th Central People's Committee (CPC) of North Korea was elected by the 1st Session of the 6th Supreme People's Assembly on 17 December 1977. It was replaced on 5 April 1982 by the 7th CPC.

== Members ==
Rank	Name	Hangul	5th CPC	7th CPC	Positions
1	Kim Il Sung	김일성	Old	Reelected	President of the Republic
2	Kim Il	김일	Old	Reelected	First Vice President of the Republic
3	Kang Yang-uk	강량욱	Old	Reelected	Vice President of the Republic
4	Choe Hyon	최현	Old	Not	—
5	Pak Song-chol	박성철	Old	Reelected	Vice President of the Republic
6	O Jin-u	오진우	Old	Reelected	—
7	So Chol	서철	New	Reelected	—
8	Ri Jong-ok	리종옥	New	Reelected	—
9	Yim Chun-chu	임춘추	Old	Reelected	—
10	O Paek-ryong	오백용	New	Reelected	—
11	Kye Ung-tae	계웅태	New	Not	—
12	Kim Hwan	김환	New	Reelected	—
13	Hong Si-hak	홍시학	New	Not	—
14	Kim Man-gum	김만검	Old	Not	—
15	No Tae-bok	아니태복	New	Not	—
