= 7th Central People's Committee =

- State Emblem of North Korea

5 April 1982 – 30 December 1986 (4 years, 269 days) Overview
- Type: Session of the Central People's Committee
- Election: 1st Session of the 7th Supreme People's Assembly

Leadership
- President: Kim Il Sung
- First Vice President: Kim Il
- Vice President: Kang Yang-uk; Pak Song-chol; Yim Chun-chu
- Secretary-General: Yi Yong-ik; Yim Chun-chu

Members
- Total: 14

The 7th Central People's Committee (CPC) of North Korea was elected by the 1st Session of the 7th Supreme People's Assembly on 5 April 1982. It was replaced on 30 December 1986 by the 8th CPC.

== Members ==
Rank	Name	Hangul	6th CPC	8th CPC	Positions
1	Kim Il Sung	김일성	Old	Reelected	President of the Republic
2	Kim Il	김일	Old	Dead	First Vice President of the Republic
3	Kang Yang-uk	강량욱	Old	Dead	Vice President of the Republic
4	Pak Song-chol	박성철	Old	Reelected	Vice President of the Republic
5	Ri Jong-ok	리종옥	Old	Reelected	—
6	O Jin-u	오진우	Old	Reelected	—
7	Yim Chun-chu	임춘추	Old	Reelected	—
8	So Chol	서철	Old	Reelected	—
9	O Paek-ryong	오백용	Old	Reelected	—
10	Kim Hwan	김환	Old	Not	—
11	Hyon Mu-kwang	현무광	New	Reelected	—
12	Yun Ki-pok	윤기폭	New	Not	—
13	Yi Kun-mo	이건모	New	Not	—
14	Kang Hui-won	강희원	New	Not	—
