= 8th Central People's Committee =

- State Emblem of North Korea

30 December 1986 – 26 May 1990 (3 years, 147 days) Overview
- Type: Session of the Central People's Committee
- Election: 1st Session of the 8th Supreme People's Assembly

Leadership
- President: Kim Il Sung
- Secretary-General: Chi Chang-ik

Members
- Total: 14

The 8th Central People's Committee (CPC) of North Korea was elected by the 1st Session of the 8th Supreme People's Assembly on 30 December 1986. It was replaced on 26 May 1990 by the 9th CPC.

== Members ==
Name	Hangul	7th CPC	9th CPC	Positions
Kim Il Sung	김일성	Old	Reelected	President of the Republic
Pak Song-chol	박성철	Old	Reelected	First Vice President of the Republic
Chi Chang-ik	치창익	New	Reelected	Secretary-General of the Central People's Committee
Cho Se-ung	조승	New	Reelected	—
Chong Song-nam	종송남	New	Not	—
Hong Song-nam	홍송남	New	Not	—
Hyon Mu-kwang	현무광	Old	Not	—
Kang Hui-won	강희원	Old	Not	—
Kim Pyong-yul	김평열	New	Not	—
O Jin-u	오진우	Old	Not	—
Paek Pom-su	백폼수	New	Not	—
Ri Jong-ok	이종옥	New	Not	Vice President of the Republic
So Yun-sok	소윤석	New	Not	—
Yi Kun-mo	이건모	Old	Not	—
Yim Chun-chu	임춘추	Old	Not	Vice President of the Republic
Yun Ki-pok	윤기폭	Old	Not	—
