= List of heads of state of North Korea =

The following is a list of heads of state of North Korea since its foundation in 1948.

== History ==
For most of its existence, North Korea has not specified a formal head of state. The 1948 constitution did not define a head of state, but with regard to political functions usually performed by the head of state, the Chairman of the Standing Committee of the Supreme People's Assembly (SPA) could be considered one. Kim Il Sung was, at the time, as Premier, merely the head of government but not of state. As his position grew more stable, he wanted to be recognized as the head of state instead. Foreign admirers first started calling him such, and in the 1972 constitution his position was formalized as the President of the republic.

After Kim Il Sung died in 1994, the presidency and hence the position of head of state was left vacant. While the late leader was titled the Eternal President of North Korea, the actual office of the President was written out of the constitution in 1998 making the head of state undefined again. His son and successor, Kim Jong Il, kept official titles given to him by the late president and never formally became the head of state. During this period, the president of the presidium of the SPA exercised many of the functions normally granted to a head of state, such as receiving ambassadors. Titles used by Kim Jong Un have constitutionally defined him as the Supreme Leader, but not formal head of state. However, amendments to the DPRK constitution in 2019 have granted the chairman of the State Affairs Commission (later renamed to president of the State Affairs), a title held by Kim, the status of representing the state and receiving and appointing ambassadors, effectively making him the head of state.

== Heads of state of North Korea (1948–present) ==
Portrait	Name (Birth–Death)	Term of office			Political party	Election	Supreme leader
Portrait	Name (Birth–Death)	Took office	Left office	Time in office	Political party	Election	Supreme leader
Chairman of the Standing Committee of the Supreme People's Assembly
	Kim Tu-bong 김두봉 (1889–1958)	9 September 1948	20 September 1957	9 years, 11 days	Workers' Party of North Korea	1st SPA	Kim Il Sung
	Kim Tu-bong 김두봉 (1889–1958)	9 September 1948	20 September 1957	9 years, 11 days	Workers' Party of Korea	1st SPA	Kim Il Sung
	Choe Yong-gon 최용건 (1900–1976)	20 September 1957	28 December 1972	15 years, 99 days	Korean Social Democratic Party	2nd SPA; 3rd SPA; 4th SPA	Kim Il Sung
	Choe Yong-gon 최용건 (1900–1976)	20 September 1957	28 December 1972	15 years, 99 days	Workers' Party of Korea	2nd SPA; 3rd SPA; 4th SPA	Kim Il Sung
President of the Democratic People's Republic of Korea
	Kim Il Sung 김일성 (1912–1994)	28 December 1972	8 July 1994 †	21 years, 192 days	Workers' Party of Korea	5th SPA; 6th SPA; 7th SPA; 8th SPA; 9th SPA	Himself
Vacant (8 July 1994 – 5 September 1998); Yang Hyong-sop as Chairman of the SPA Standing Committee; Kim Jong Il as supreme leader
President of the Presidium of the Supreme People's Assembly
	Kim Yong-nam 김영남 (1928–2025)	5 September 1998	11 April 2019 (Note: According to South Korean reports, Kim Yong-nam lost his status as head of state at the time of the 2009 constitutional amendment, under which the chairman of the National Defense Commission (then Kim Jong Il) was responsible for state-related affairs.)	20 years, 218 days	Workers' Party of Korea	10th SPA; 11th SPA; 12th SPA; 13th SPA	Kim Jong Il; Kim Jong Un
President of the State Affairs Commission
	Kim Jong Un 김정은 (born 1984)	11 April 2019	Incumbent	7 years, 207 days	Workers' Party of Korea	14th SPA	Himself

== See also ==
- Supreme Leader (North Korean title)
- Government of North Korea
- Politics of North Korea
