= Supreme Leader (North Korean title) =

Political term for the top leader in North Korea

Supreme Leader of the Democratic People's Republic of Korea
- Emblem of the Workers' Party of Korea

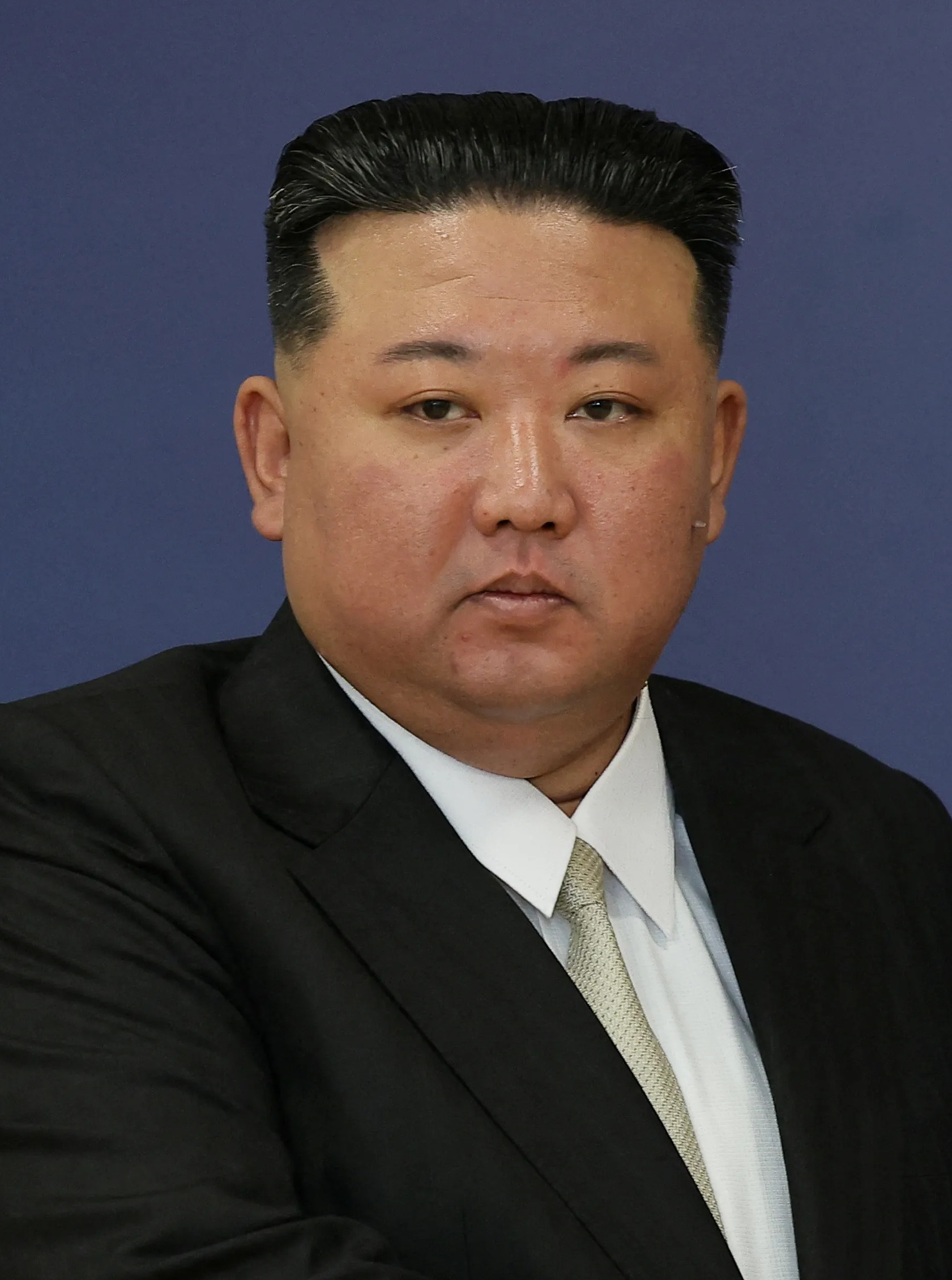
- Incumbent; Kim Jong Un since 17 December 2011
- Style: Respected Comrade (informal); Great Comrade (informal); Dear Respected Comrade (informal); General Secretary (formal); Historical: Great Leader (informal)
- Type: Party leader; Head of state (de facto) (Note: Between 1948 and 2019 the Chairman of the Standing Committee of the Supreme People's Assembly was considered to be the de facto head of state rather than the Supreme Leader, however other sources claim that the Chairman of the Standing Committee of the Supreme People's Assembly was the ceremonial head of state and not the de facto one.); Head of government (de facto); Commander-in-chief
- Abbreviation: Great Leader; Dear Leader; Great Supreme Leader; Supreme Leader of our Party, Military and People
- Residence: Ryongsong Residence
- Seat: Pyongyang
- Appointer: Hereditary (de facto)
- Term length: Five years, renewable (notionally, de iure) Life tenure (Note: The offices of General Secretary and President of the State Affairs Commission last five years.) (de facto)
- Formation: 9 September 1948; 78 years ago
- First holder: Kim Il Sung
- Unofficial names: Top Leader
- Deputy: De facto Number Two (disputed)

- Supreme Leader
- Hangul: 최고령도자
- Hanja: 最高領導者
- RR: Choego ryeongdoja
- MR: Ch'oego ryŏngdoja

The supreme leader (Korean: 최고령도자; Hanja: 最高領導者; MR: ch'oego ryŏngdoja) is the de facto hereditary leader of the Workers' Party of Korea, the Democratic People's Republic of Korea (North Korea) and the Korean People's Army. The title is honorary, given only after death in the first two cases. More broadly it can also refer to the "Supreme Leader system" (수령제 Suryŏngje lit. 'Leadersystem'), which is defined as "a system that aims to ensure continuous leadership by the Supreme Leader across generations". Different titles were used in North Korean propaganda that could be translated from Korean as "Great Leader", "Dear Leader" or "Supreme Leader". Similar to other one-party states, the post of General Secretary of the Workers' Party of Korea (titled as chairman from 1948 to 1966, as First Secretary from 2012 to 2016, and Chairman again from 2016 to 2021) is the highest-priority political position of the Leader.

== Overview ==
"Supreme Leader" was originally a designation used for Kim Il Sung only, and only after his death. During his lifetime he was known as "Great Leader" (위대한 수령 Widaehan Suryŏng), a title that to this day is most often used to refer to him. His son, Kim Jong Il, was known as "Dear Leader" (친애하는 령도자 Ch'inaehanŭn Ryŏngdoja) during his lifetime, and only after death did North Korean media begin calling him "Supreme Leader", in the tradition of his father.

The grandson, Kim Jong Un, was first called "Supreme Leader" in a North Korean newspaper article dated 3 October 2020, with the frequency increasing since then, including sometimes "great Supreme Leader". He was the first to be frequently called "Supreme Leader" while still alive, and at the relatively young age of 37. The 2020 newspaper article was part of the official preparations to appoint Kim Jong Un as the General Secretary of the Workers' Party of Korea i.e. leader of the Workers' Party, the effectively sole political body in the country and the top leader position.

Following the 8th WPK Congress in January 2021, North Korea stopped calling Kim Jong Un "supreme leader". The congress changed the WPK general secretary's title from "the supreme leader of the Party" to "the head of the WPK". Starting from September 2024, North Korean state media has referred to Kim Jong Un as the "head of state".

Since November 2021, all South Korean media outlets have reported that Kim Jong Un is called "Supreme Leader" (수령 Suryŏng) in North Korea, although 수령 also means simply "Leader" (as a short way of saying "Dear/Great Leader", whereas "Supreme Leader" would be Ch'inaehanŭn Ryŏngdoja). The South China Morning Post reported on 23 March 2026 that the President of the State Affairs is the Supreme Leader according to the Constitution, while before the President of State Affairs was called Supreme Representative of all the Korean people.

== List ==
No	Portrait	Name (Birth–Death)	Title(s)	Period	Tenure (Time in office)	Ideological contribution(s)
1		Kim Il Sung 김일성 (1912–1994)	Premier of the Cabinet of the DPRK	9 September 1948 – 28 December 1972	9 September 1948 — 8 July 1994 (45 years, 302 days)	Juche; Ten Principles
1		Kim Il Sung 김일성 (1912–1994)	Chairman of the WPK	24 June 1949 – 12 October 1966	9 September 1948 — 8 July 1994 (45 years, 302 days)	Juche; Ten Principles
1		Kim Il Sung 김일성 (1912–1994)	General Secretary of the WPK	12 October 1966 – 8 July 1994	9 September 1948 — 8 July 1994 (45 years, 302 days)	Juche; Ten Principles
1		Kim Il Sung 김일성 (1912–1994)	President of the DPRK	28 December 1972 – 8 July 1994	9 September 1948 — 8 July 1994 (45 years, 302 days)	Juche; Ten Principles
2		Kim Jong Il 김정일 (1941–2011) (Note: South Korean government officials and academic North Korea experts suggested that Jang Song-thaek was the de facto leader of North Korea from late 2008 until some days after the death of Kim Jong-Il, before Jang was considered to be the de facto number two in the regime after the death of Kim Il-Sung. Ha Tae-keung claimed in 2010, that during the period where Kim Jong-Il was on a state-visit in China, that Kim Jong-Un ran the country.)	Chairman of the National Defence Commission of the DPRK	9 April 1993 – 17 December 2011	8 July 1994 — 17 December 2011 (17 years, 162 days)	Kimilsungism; Songun
2		Kim Jong Il 김정일 (1941–2011)	General Secretary of the WPK	8 October 1997 – 17 December 2011	8 July 1994 — 17 December 2011 (17 years, 162 days)	Kimilsungism; Songun
3		Kim Jong Un 김정은 (born 1982 or 1983/1984) (Note: In 2012, Kim Jong-gak was regarded to be the de facto number three. Hwang Pyong-so was seen as the de facto number two in 2015. Kim Yo-jong was considere to be the de facto number two, from 2020 until 2021. While in 2021 Jo Yong Won was considered to be the de facto number two as Deputy General Secretary/First Secretary. Between September 2023 until.late-2025 Kim Yo Jong was again considered to be the de facto number two. Jo Yong-won was again regarded to be the de facto number two in the regime on 22 March 2026. As of August 2026, Kim's sister is again seen as the de facto number two.)	First Secretary of the WPK	11 April 2012 – 9 May 2016	17 December 2011 (Note: First reports that he became the Supreme Leader came out on 27 December 2011.) — present (14 years, 337 days)	Kimilsungism–Kimjongilism; Byungjin
3		Kim Jong Un 김정은 (born 1982 or 1983/1984)	First Chairman of the National Defence Commission of the DPRK	11 April 2012 – 29 June 2016	17 December 2011 — present (14 years, 337 days)	Kimilsungism–Kimjongilism; Byungjin
3		Kim Jong Un 김정은 (born 1982 or 1983/1984)	Chairman of the WPK	9 May 2016 – 10 January 2021	17 December 2011 — present (14 years, 337 days)	Kimilsungism–Kimjongilism; Byungjin
3		Kim Jong Un 김정은 (born 1982 or 1983/1984)	President of the State Affairs Commission of the DPRK	29 June 2016 – present	17 December 2011 — present (14 years, 337 days)	Kimilsungism–Kimjongilism; Byungjin
3		Kim Jong Un 김정은 (born 1982 or 1983/1984)	General Secretary of the WPK	10 January 2021 – present	17 December 2011 — present (14 years, 337 days)	Kimilsungism–Kimjongilism; Byungjin

- Bold offices refer to the highest positions in the Workers' Party of Korea, the only permitted political party in North Korea.

== See also ==
- List of heads of state of North Korea
- Eternal leaders of North Korea
- Kim family
- Government of North Korea
- North Korean cult of personality
- Residences of North Korean leaders
- Paramount leader, the Chinese equivalent
- Supreme Leader of Democratic Kampuchea
- Supreme Leader of Iran
- Supreme Leader of Afghanistan
- Supreme Leader of Turkmenistan
