= 9th Central People's Committee =

- State Emblem of North Korea

26 May 1990 – 6 September 1998 (8 years, 103 days) Overview
- Type: Session of the Central People's Committee
- Election: 1st Session of the 9th Supreme People's Assembly

Leadership
- President: Kim Il Sung
- Secretary-General: Chi Chang-ik

Members
- Total: 14

The 9th Central People's Committee (CPC) of North Korea was elected by the 1st Session of the 8th Supreme People's Assembly on 26 May 1990. The CPC was abolished and replaced on 6 September 1998 by the 10th National Defence Commission.

== Members ==
Name	Hangul	8th CPC	Positions
Kim Il Sung	김일성	Old	President of the Republic
Pak Song-chol	박성철	Old	Vice President of the Republic
Chi Chang-ik	치창익	Old	Secretary-General of the Central People's Committee
Cho Se-ung	조승	Old	—
Choe Mun-son	최문손	New	—
Han Song-yong	한성룡	New	—
Hong Si-hak	현무광	New	—
Kang Hyon-su	강현수	New	—
Kang Song-san	강성산	New	—
Kim Hak-pong	김학퐁	New	—
Kim Ki-son	김기손	New	—
Pak Song-il	박송일	New	—
Yim Hyong-ku	임형구	New	—
Yom ki-sun	염기선	New	—
