= Premier of North Korea =

Head of government

Premier of the Cabinet of the Democratic People's Republic of Korea
- 조선민주주의인민공화국 내각총리
- Emblem of North Korea

- Flag of North Korea

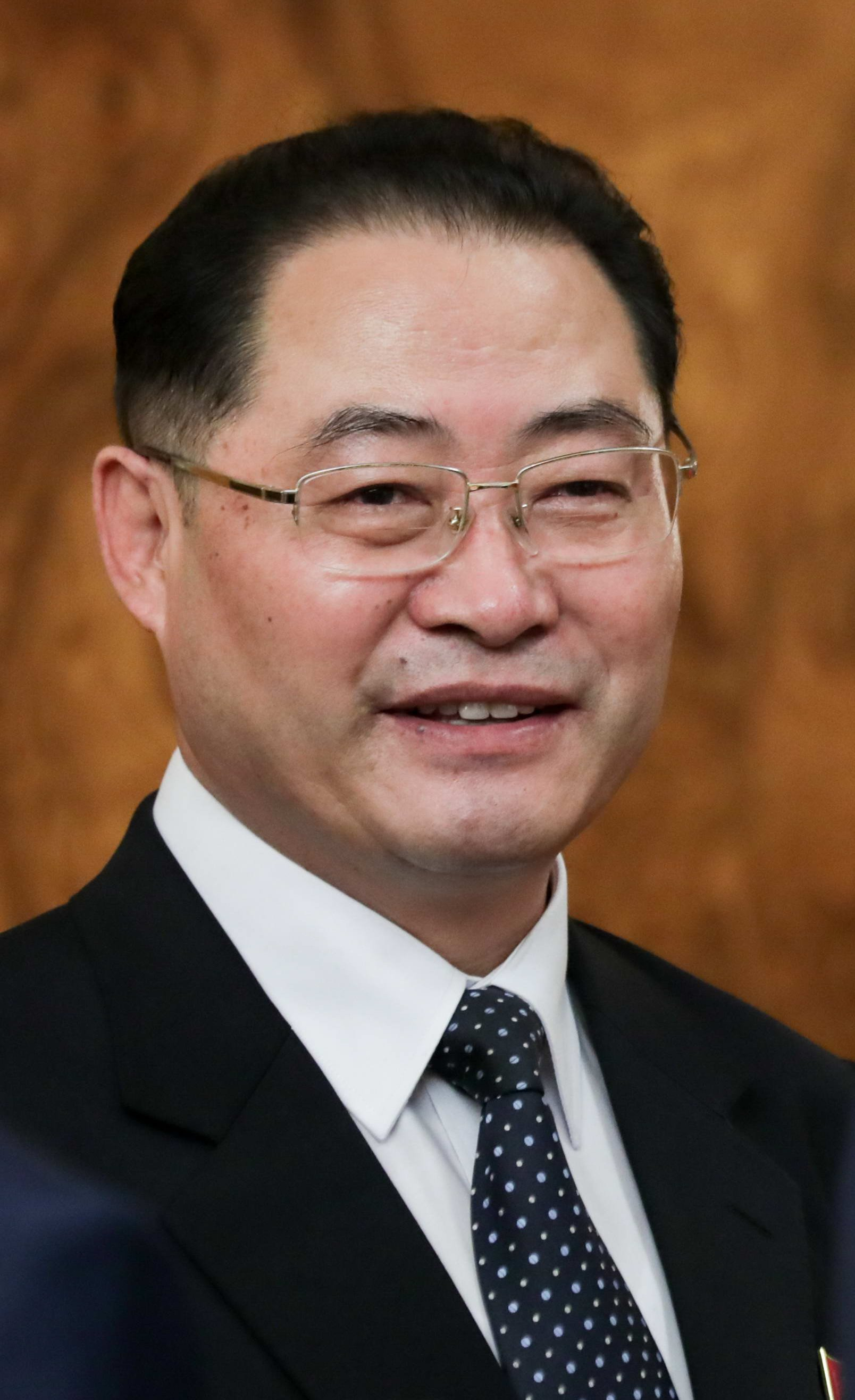
- Incumbent; Pak Thae-song since 29 December 2024
- Cabinet of North Korea
- Type: Head of government
- Member of: Cabinet
- Nominator: Supreme People's Assembly
- Appointer: Supreme People's Assembly President of the State Affairs Commission (when the SPA is not in session)
- Term length: Five years, renewable
- Inaugural holder: Kim Il Sung
- Formation: 9 September 1948; 78 years ago
- Deputy: Vice Premier

- Premier of the Cabinet of the Democratic People's Republic of Korea
- Hangul: 조선민주주의인민공화국 내각총리
- Hanja: 朝鮮民主主義人民共和國內閣總理
- RR: Joseon minjujuui inmin gonghwaguk naegak chongni
- MR: Chosŏn minjujuŭi inmin konghwaguk naegak ch'ongni

The premier of North Korea, officially the premier of the Cabinet of the Democratic People's Republic of Korea, is the head of government of North Korea and leader of the North Korean Cabinet.

The office was established in 1948, with Kim Il Sung serving as the inaugural premier. During this period, the premiership was the highest state post. In 1972, with the creation of the state of the state president, many of the office's powers were transferred to the presidency and the Central People's Committee. The premier is officially appointed by the Supreme People's Assembly (SPA), which also appoints other members of the Cabinet on the nomination of the premier. The premier organizes and leads the Cabinet, and constitutionally represents the government of North Korea. The premier also attends the plenary meetings and the permanent committee meetings of the Cabinet. The incumbent premier is Pak Thae-song, since 29 December 2024.

== History ==
Originally, under the 1948 Constitution of the DPRK, the Premier was the highest state post in North Korea and the head of government. Kim Il Sung himself inaugurated the post, keeping it for 24 years until 1972, while the ceremonial role of the head of state rested in the Chairman of the Standing Committee of the Supreme People's Assembly.

The 1972 Constitution created the post of President, which replaced the premiership as the top state post. The executive presidency was created with Kim in mind, and he transferred to that post soon after the Constitution was promulgated. The Premier was now the head of the Administration Council, but most of the powers of the former cabinet were passed to the Central People's Committee, the highest ruling council chaired by the president himself. The first premier after Kim Il Sung was his long-time ally Kim Il. The post was then officially known as Premier of the Administration Council (정무원 총리, jungmuwon chongni).

After Kim Il Sung died, the post of president remained vacant (officially Kim Il Sung was proclaimed Eternal President) as his son Kim Jong Il planned a new State reorganization. A constitution revision in 1998 abolished both the Central People's Committee and the Administration Council, re-creating the Cabinet.

== Functions ==
The premier is officially elected by the Supreme People's Assembly (SPA), which also has the right to recall the premier. The premier also nominates the candidacies for other members of the Cabinet, including vice premiers, the cabinet chairman, various ministers and other cabinet members, which are then appointed by the SPA. A newly-appointed premier takes an oath of allegiance in the SPA on behalf of other cabinet members.

The premier organizes and oversees the cabinet, and represents the government of North Korea. The premier also attends the plenary meetings and the permanent committee meetings of the Cabinet. The cabinet is charged with executing the policies decided by the Central Committee of the Workers' Party of Korea and the office effectively has no policy-making authority of its own.

Until 2019, the Premier was nominally part of a triumvirate overseeing North Korea's executive branch, alongside the Chairman of the Standing Committee of the Supreme People's Assembly and the President of the State Affairs Commission. According to the constitution, the SAC President, SPA Standing Committee chairman and Premier had powers equivalent to one-third of those of a president's powers in most presidential systems. The SPA Standing Committee chairman conducted foreign relations, the premier handled domestic matters and headed the government, and the SAC President (known as the chairman of the National Defence Commission before 2016) commanded the armed forces. However, the SAC President is constitutionally defined as "the highest post in the state" and the country's supreme leader. In 2019, however, the SAC President was formally defined as the country's head of state.

The Premier ranked as the lowest member of the executive triumvirate: significantly, Kim Jong Il was NDC Chairman without interruption from 1993 until 2011, and Kim Yong-nam was President of the SPA Presidium from 1998 to 2019, while there have been six premiers since Kim Il Sung's death. Kim Tok Hun, the incumbent Premier, has assumed the second-ranking position, while Choe Ryong-hae, Chairman of the SPA Standing Committee, is currently ranked third.

== List of office holders ==
The following is a list of premiers of North Korea since its founding in 1948:

No.	Portrait	Name (Birth–Death)	Term of office			Party	Head of state	SPA
No.	Portrait	Name (Birth–Death)	Took office	Left office	Time in office	Party	Head of state	SPA
Premier of the Cabinet 내각 수상
1		Kim Il Sung 김일성 (1912–1994)	9 September 1948	28 December 1972	24 years, 110 days	Workers' Party of North Korea (until 1949)	Kim Tu-bong (1948–1957)	1st
1		Kim Il Sung 김일성 (1912–1994)	9 September 1948	28 December 1972	24 years, 110 days	Workers' Party of Korea (from 1949)	Kim Tu-bong (1948–1957)	1st
1		Kim Il Sung 김일성 (1912–1994)	9 September 1948	28 December 1972	24 years, 110 days	Workers' Party of Korea (from 1949)	Choe Yong-gon (1957–1972)	2nd
1		Kim Il Sung 김일성 (1912–1994)	9 September 1948	28 December 1972	24 years, 110 days	Workers' Party of Korea (from 1949)	Choe Yong-gon (1957–1972)	3rd
1		Kim Il Sung 김일성 (1912–1994)	9 September 1948	28 December 1972	24 years, 110 days	Workers' Party of Korea (from 1949)	Choe Yong-gon (1957–1972)	4th
Premier of the Administration Council 정무원 총리
2		Kim Il 김일 (1910–1984)	28 December 1972	30 April 1976	3 years, 124 days	Workers' Party of Korea	Kim Il Sung (1972–1994)	5th
3		Pak Song-chol 박성철 (1913–2008)	30 April 1976	15 December 1977	1 year, 229 days	Workers' Party of Korea	Kim Il Sung (1972–1994)	5th
4		Ri Jong-ok 리종옥 (1916–1999)	15 December 1977	25 January 1984	6 years, 41 days	Workers' Party of Korea	Kim Il Sung (1972–1994)	6th
4		Ri Jong-ok 리종옥 (1916–1999)	15 December 1977	25 January 1984	6 years, 41 days	Workers' Party of Korea	Kim Il Sung (1972–1994)	7th
5		Kang Song-san 강성산 (1931–2000)	25 January 1984	29 December 1986	2 years, 338 days	Workers' Party of Korea	Kim Il Sung (1972–1994)	7th
6		Ri Kun-mo 리근모 (1926–2001)	29 December 1986	12 December 1988	1 year, 349 days	Workers' Party of Korea	Kim Il Sung (1972–1994)	8th
7		Yon Hyong-muk 연형묵 (1931–2005)	12 December 1988	11 December 1992	3 years, 365 days	Workers' Party of Korea	Kim Il Sung (1972–1994)	8th
7		Yon Hyong-muk 연형묵 (1931–2005)	12 December 1988	11 December 1992	3 years, 365 days	Workers' Party of Korea	Kim Il Sung (1972–1994)	9th
(5)		Kang Song-san 강성산 (1931–2000)	11 December 1992	21 February 1997	4 years, 72 days	Workers' Party of Korea	Kim Il Sung (1972–1994)	9th
(5)		Kang Song-san 강성산 (1931–2000)	11 December 1992	21 February 1997	4 years, 72 days	Workers' Party of Korea	Vacant (1994–1998)	9th
–		Hong Song-nam 홍성남 (1929–2009); Acting Premier	21 February 1997	5 September 1998	1 year, 196 days	Workers' Party of Korea	Vacant (1994–1998)	9th
Premier of the Cabinet 내각총리
8		Hong Song-nam 홍성남 (1929–2009)	5 September 1998	3 September 2003	4 years, 363 days	Workers' Party of Korea	Kim Yong-nam (1998–2019)	10th
9		Pak Pong-ju 박봉주 (born 1939)	3 September 2003	11 April 2007	3 years, 220 days	Workers' Party of Korea	Kim Yong-nam (1998–2019)	11th
10		Kim Yong-il 김영일 (born 1944)	11 April 2007	7 June 2010	3 years, 57 days	Workers' Party of Korea	Kim Yong-nam (1998–2019)	11th
10		Kim Yong-il 김영일 (born 1944)	11 April 2007	7 June 2010	3 years, 57 days	Workers' Party of Korea	Kim Yong-nam (1998–2019)	12th
11		Choe Yong-rim 최영림 (born 1930)	7 June 2010	1 April 2013	2 years, 298 days	Workers' Party of Korea	Kim Yong-nam (1998–2019)	12th
(9)		Pak Pong-ju 박봉주 (born 1939)	1 April 2013	11 April 2019	6 years, 10 days	Workers' Party of Korea	Kim Yong-nam (1998–2019)	12th
(9)		Pak Pong-ju 박봉주 (born 1939)	1 April 2013	11 April 2019	6 years, 10 days	Workers' Party of Korea	Kim Yong-nam (1998–2019)	13th
12		Kim Jae-ryong 김재룡 (born 1959)	11 April 2019	13 August 2020	1 year, 124 days	Workers' Party of Korea	Kim Jong Un (since 2019)	14th
13		Kim Tok-hun 김덕훈 (born 1961)	13 August 2020	24 December 2024	4 years, 133 days	Workers' Party of Korea	Kim Jong Un (since 2019)	14th
14		Pak Thae-song 박태성 (born 1955)	24 December 2024	Incumbent	1 year, 325 days	Workers' Party of Korea	Kim Jong Un (since 2019)	14th
14		Pak Thae-song 박태성 (born 1955)	24 December 2024	Incumbent	1 year, 325 days	Workers' Party of Korea	Kim Jong Un (since 2019)	15th

== See also ==
- Prime Minister of Imperial Korea (1895–1910)
- Prime Minister of South Korea
- Government of North Korea
