= Korean Ministry of Culture =

Korean Ministry of Culture may refer to:

- Ministry of Culture, Sports and Tourism (South Korea)
- Ministry of Culture (North Korea) of the cabinet of North Korea
