= Kang Ryang-uk =

North Korean minister and politician (1903–1983)

- 강량욱

2nd Vice President of North Korea
- In office 28 December 1972 – 15 December 1977
- President: Kim Il Sung
- Preceded by: Choe Yong-gon
- Succeeded by: Kim Tong-gyu

7th Vice President of North Korea
- In office 15 December 1977 – 5 April 1982
- President: Kim Il Sung
- Preceded by: Pak Song-chol
- Succeeded by: Kim Il

Personal details
- Born: 7 December 1903 Pyongyang, Korean Empire
- Died: 9 January 1983 (aged 79) Pyongyang, North Korea
- Religion: Presbyterianism

Korean name
- Hangul: 강량욱
- Hanja: 康良煜
- RR: Gang Ryanguk
- MR: Kang Ryanguk

Kang Ryang-uk (Korean: 강량욱; 7 December 1903 – 9 January 1983), also spelled Kang Lyanguk, was a North Korean Presbyterian minister and Chairman of the Korean Christian Federation since 1946.

== Biography ==
Kang was born on 7 December 1903.

Kang was the maternal uncle of North Korean leader Kim Il Sung. Kim's mother, Kang's cousin, was Kang Pan Sok, who was also a devout Presbyterian. In his early years, Kang was a schoolteacher at Changdok School(one of his pupils was Kim Il Sung). Changdok School was a private school that Kim Il Sung's maternal grandfather, Kang Ton Uk, established at Chilgol in 1908. In the 1940s he studied Theology at Pyongyang University, and after he completed his study, he became a minister.

Kang became a close adviser to Kim Il Sung shortly after his return from the Soviet Union in October 1945. In 1946 he became the Chairman of the Christian League, later called the Korean Christian Federation. This organization was in close contact with the Communist Party. In 1949 all Protestant Ministers were forced to join Kang's Christian Federation.

In the late 1940s, Kang became Vice Chairman of the Korean Social Democratic Party, which was a close ally of the ruling Workers' Party of Korea.

He became the chairman of the party in November 1958.

Kang later served as a Vice President of North Korea and a secretary of the Supreme People's Assembly. He was appointed as vice president by the Supreme People's Assembly on 28 December 1972. He was re-endorsed for the role on 15 December 1977 and eventually left the office in 1982.

== Death and legacy ==
He died on 9 January 1983. Kim Il Sung mourned his death at a ceremony shortly afterward. According to the 12 January 1983 announcement of his death, a state funeral was planned for him.

Kang's second son, Kang Yong-sop, later succeeded him as head of the Korean Christian Federation.
