= Kim Pyong-sik =

North Korean politician (1919–1999)

- 김병식

Vice President of North Korea
- In office December 11, 1993 – October 1997
- Preceded by: Kim Yong-ju
- Succeeded by: Office abolished

Personal details
- Born: February 10, 1919 Zenranan Province, Korea, Empire of Japan
- Died: July 21, 1999 (aged 80) Pyongyang, North Korea
- Party: Korean Social Democratic Party

Korean name
- Hangul: 김병식
- Hanja: 金炳植
- RR: Gim Byeongsik
- MR: Kim Pyŏngsik

Kim Pyong-sik (Korean: 김병식; February 10, 1919 – July 21, 1999) was a North Korean politician who served as Vice President of North Korea and chairman of the Korean Social Democratic Party.

== History ==
He was born in Zenranan Province, Korea, Empire of Japan. Kim worked for the Union of Korean Students in Japan and the North Korean Central News Agency. After the creation of the General Association of Koreans residing in Japan (Chongryon, pro-communist organization) in 1955, he held important positions within this organization. Later, he returned to North Korea and joined the Korean Social Democratic Party, a party that became pro-communist under Choi Yong-kun which closely related with the Workers' Party of Korea. Kim Pyong-sik was a member of the Presidium of the Central Committee of the Korean Social Democratic Party and later became its president. After his resignation as president, he continued to work as an adviser to the Central Committee of the Social Democratic Party and had influence over the party. From 1994 until 1998, he was vice-president of North Korea.

Kim Pyong-sik was also vice chairman of the Standing Committee of the Supreme People's Assembly, North Korea's unicameral parliament.

Kim died in Pyongyang on 21 July 1999. He was given a state funeral with 18 persons on the funeral committee including Hong Song-nam. He was posthumously awarded the National Reunification Prize on August 5, 1999.

== Works ==
- Kim, Byong Sik (1970). Perlo, Victor (ed.). Modern Korea: The Socialist North, Revolutionary Perspectives in the South, and Unification. Translated by Haga, Takeshi. New York: International Publishers. OCLC 939856066.

Party political offices
Preceded by Ri Kye-baek	Leader of the Korean Social Democratic Party; 1933–1993	Succeeded by Kim Yong-dae
