= Yim Chun-chu =

North Korean politician (1912–1988)

- 임춘추

Vice President of North Korea
- In office 1983–1988 Serving with Pak Song-chol, Ri Jong-ok
- President: Kim Il Sung

Secretary of the Central People's Committee
- In office December 1972 – 1983

Member of the WPK Politburo

Personal details
- Born: March 8, 1912 Yanji, Jilin, Republic of China
- Died: April 27, 1988 (aged 76) Pyongyang, North Korea
- Party: Workers' Party of Korea

- Yim Chun-chu
- Hangul: 임춘추
- RR: Im Chunchu
- MR: Im Ch'unch'u

Yim Chun-chu (Korean: 임춘추; March 8, 1912 – April 27, 1988) was a North Korean politician. He served as Vice President of North Korea, and member of the Politburo of the Workers' Party of Korea. He was a member of the guerrilla faction.

== Biography ==
He was born in Yanji, Jilin, China, in 1912, and joined the anti-Japanese guerrillas in the early 1930s. He worked with Kim Il Sung as a military surgeon in the guerrilla army, and was part of the first generation of revolutionaries who served in the 88th International Brigade of the Northeast Anti-Japanese Army and the Soviet Far East.

In 1945, he became Secretary of the Ping An South Road of the Communist Party of Korea. In April 1947, invited by Zhou Baozhong to serve as an officer in Antu County, Jilin Province. In March 1948, he served as a member of the Yanbian Administrative Inspector's Office and deputy secretary of the Yanbian District Committee.

Following its official proclamation, he returned to North Korea in January 1949 and June 1950. He served as chairman of the Kangwon Province Party Committee, and in December 1950 lost his footing and was criticized together with Wu Ting, Jin Yi, and Cui Guang.

He was appointed ambassador to Albania in May 1957, Secretary of the Standing Committee of the Supreme People's Congress and ambassador to Bulgaria in October 1962, Minister of the Workers' Party of Korea in 1963, Criticism of Lost Foot in 1967, Secretary of the Central People's Committee (the predecessor of the Cabinet of North Korea) in December 1972 Chief, Member of the Party Central Committee and Party Political Bureau in October 1980 following the decision of the 6th Congress of the Workers' Party of Korea. He was appointed vice president in April 1983, and died in April 1988.

Yim died on April 27, 1988 in Pyongyang. He was awarded a state funeral with a funeral committee consisting of 57 persons including Kim Il Sung, Kim Jong Il, and O Jin-u.

== Works ==
- Lim Chun Chu (1968). "Great Plan for the Fatherland's Restoration". Reminiscences of the Anti-Japanese Guerillas. Pyongyang: Foreign Languages Publishing House. OCLC 3207400.
- — (1968). "Guidance in Revolutionary Publications". Reminiscences of the Anti-Japanese Guerillas. Pyongyang: Foreign Languages Publishing House. OCLC 3207400.
- — (1970). "A Long March of 80,000 Kilometers". Reminiscences of the Anti-Japanese Guerillas. Pyongyang: Foreign Languages Publishing House. OCLC 1097890.
- — (1974). "The Battle of Lotzukou, Wangching County". Holding High the Banner of Anti-Imperialist Struggle. Pyongyang: Foreign Languages Publishing House. OCLC 6199468.
