= Choe Yong-gon (official) =

North Korean politician (1900–1976)

Vice Marshal Choe Yong-gon
- 최용건
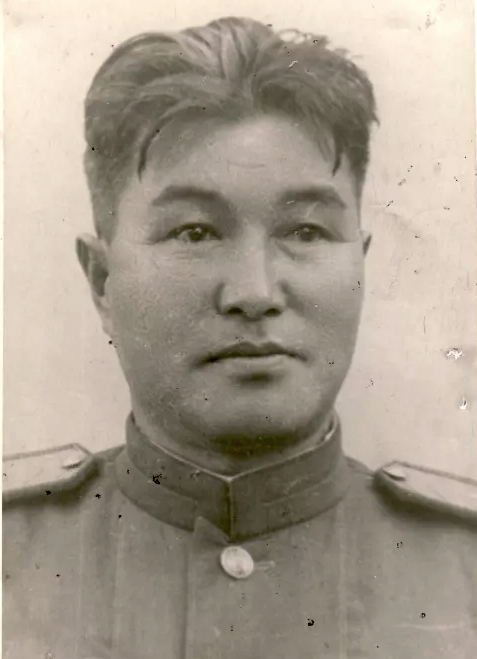

Vice President of North Korea
- In office 28 December 1972 – 19 September 1976
- Preceded by: office established
- Succeeded by: Kang Ryang-uk

Minister of Defence
- In office 2 September 1948 – 20 September 1957
- Preceded by: Office established
- Succeeded by: Kim Kwang-hyop

Chairman of the Standing Committee of the Supreme People's Assembly
- In office 20 September 1957 – 28 December 1972
- Preceded by: Kim Tu-bong
- Succeeded by: Hwang Jang-yop

Chief Commander of the Korean People's Army
- In office 2 September 1948 – 4 July 1950
- Preceded by: Office established
- Succeeded by: Kim Il Sung

Personal details
- Born: 21 June 1900 Taechon County, North Pyongan, Korean Empire
- Died: 19 September 1976 (aged 76) Pyongyang, North Korea
- Party: Korean Democratic Party

Military service
- Allegiance: North Korea
- Branch/service: Korean People's Army
- Years of service: 1927–1976
- Rank: Ch'asu (Vice Marshal)
- Commands: Supreme Commander
- Battles/wars: Chinese Civil War; Korean Independence Movement; World War II; Korean War

Korean name
- Hangul: 최용건
- Hanja: 崔庸健
- RR: Choe Yonggeon
- MR: Ch'oe Yonggŏn

Choe Yong-gon (Korean: 최용건; 21 June 1900 – 19 September 1976) was a North Korean military officer and politician. He served as the Chief Commander of the Korean People's Army from 1948 to 1950, and as defence minister from 1948 to 1957. He also served as Chairman of the Standing Committee of the Supreme People's Assembly of North Korea from 1957 to 1972.

== Early life and education ==
Choe was born in Taechon County, North Pyongan, Korean Empire in 1900. According to the CIA, he was raised in a landowning family. For his participation in the 1919 March First Movement, Choe was imprisoned by the Empire of Japan for three years until his release in 1922. Afterwards he emigrated to China where he studied at the Yunnan Military Academy and later the Whampoa Military Academy, graduating in 1924 and 1927 respectively.

== Career ==
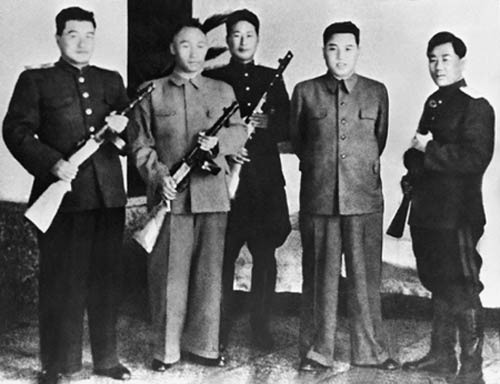
Choe Yong-gon, Kim Chaek, Kim Il, and Kang Kon receiving the first domestically produced Type 49 submachine guns from Premier Kim Il Sung, 1949.

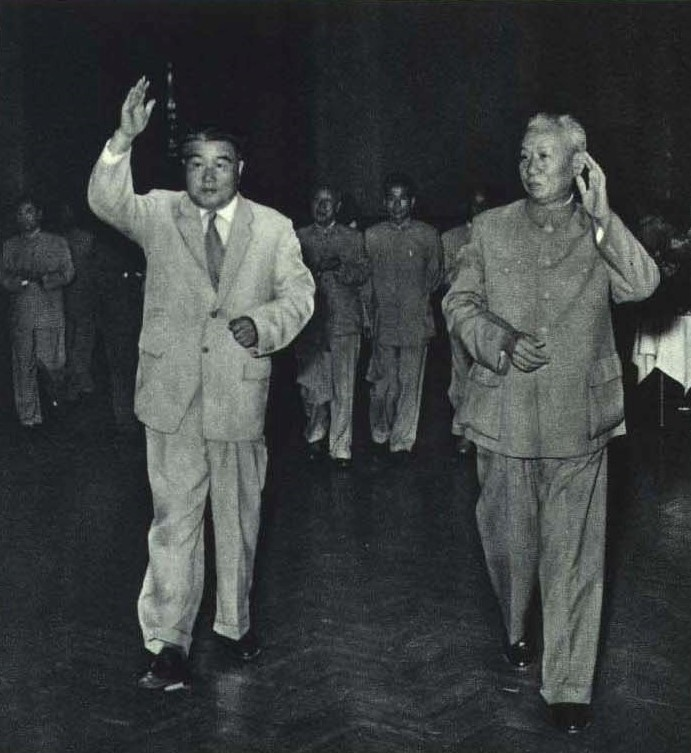
Choe Yong-gon with the Chairman of the People's Republic of China Liu Shaoqi during his official visit to Beijing, 5 June 1963.

Choe's first military deployment was to fight the Chinese Northern Expedition of 1927. He also took part in the Canton Communist riots in December later that year. He moved to Manchuria to form a guerrilla organization and military academy school to train the anti-Japanese guerrilla army. Choe joined the Chinese Communist Party and the Northeast Anti-Japanese United Army in 1936.

He led a guerrilla unit against the Japanese after they occupied Manchuria (Manchukuo) in September 1931. In 1940, Choe and his troops had fled to the Soviet-Manchurian border in the Soviet Union and participated with the 88th Independent Brigade of the Soviet Army.

In 1945, he returned to Korea after Japan was defeated in World War II.

In 1946, he became the chairman of the Korean Democratic Party (KDP) and led this organization to a pro-communist course. He was, however, concurrently secretly a member of the ruling Workers' Party of Korea and tasked with keeping the KDP from becoming an independent political force. Afterwards, he came into more promotions and by February 1948, he was appointed the Chief Commander of the Korean People's Army.

Choe was the vice chairman of the People's Assembly of North Korea. On 10 July 1948, Choe formally addressed its members to inquire if any opinions were held regarding the constitution, of which there were none. A vote was held afterwards, where full majority voted in favor of the constitution. Choe then said that the Constitution of the Democratic People’s Republic of Korea had been "unanimously adopted without any amendments!" Assembly member Kim Tu-bong replaced the Taegukgi behind the tribune and replaced it with the new flag of North Korea, after which Choe declared the constitution to be in effect.

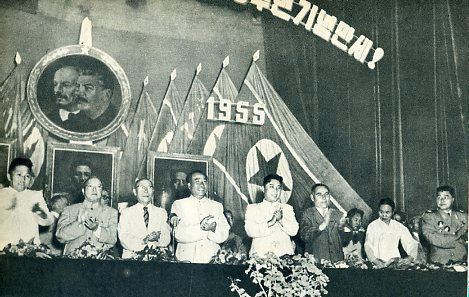
From left to right: Pak Chang-ok, Li Jishen, Kim Tu-bong, Zhu De, Kim Il Sung, Averky Aristov, Pak Chŏng Ae, and Choe Yong-gon in 1955.

When Kim Il Sung was appointed as premier following the official proclamation of the DPRK on September 9, 1948, he was appointed the Minister of National Security. He was in fact the senior field commander for all the North Korean armies during the Korean War, from the first invasion of South Korea in June 1950 till the Korean Armistice Agreement was signed in July 1953.

In 1953, Choe was promoted to Vice Marshal and was made the Minister of Defence. In September 1957, he was removed from his position as Minister of Defense and made the Chairman of the Standing Committee of the Supreme People's Assembly, a largely ceremonial position. In this post, he was North Korea's nominal head of state. He was appointed as Vice President by the Supreme People's Assembly in 1972 and he left the office in 1974. He died in Pyongyang in 1976. Following his death he was given a state funeral.

== Personal life ==
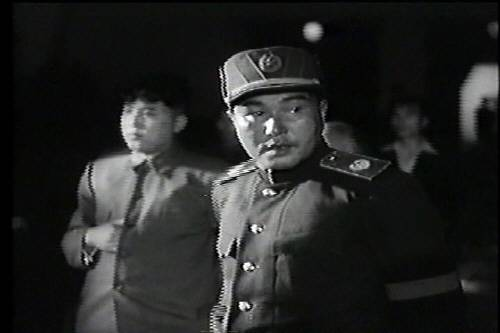
Choe Yong-gon and Kim Il Sung at Kim Chaek's funeral, 1 February 1951.

In his memoirs, Hwang Jang-yop, a former chairman of the Supreme People's Assembly who defected to South Korea said Choe was famous for being very hard to have close relations with, but in reality he was not that strict.

In 1970 there were reports of his deteriorating health, and after attending in November 1970 the KWP Congress and retaining his Vice-Marshal position, he departed for treatment in the German Democratic Republic.

== Works ==
- Choi, Yong-kun (1960). Concerning Further Promotion of the Peaceful Unification of the Fatherland: Report Presented by Choi Yong Keun (Choi Yong Kun) at the 8th Session of the 2nd Term of the Supreme People's Assembly of the Democratic People's Republic of Korea, Nov. 19, 1960. Tokyo: General Association of the Koreans in Japan. OCLC 83502262.
- — (1962). On Waging a Nation-wide Struggle for the Withdrawal of the U.S. Army From South Korea: Report of President Choi Yong Kun at the 11th Session of the 2nd Supreme People's Assembly of the DPRK (June 20, 1962). Tokyo: General Association of the Koreans in Japan. OCLC 2316900.
- — (1963). Report at the Pyongyang City Celebrations of the 15th Anniversary of the Founding of the Democratic People's Republic of Korea. Pyongyang: Foreign Languages Publishing House. OCLC 610305536.
- Liu, Shao-chi; Choi, Yong-kun (1963). Joint statement of Chairman Liu Shao-chi and President Choi Yong Kun. Peking: Foreign Languages Press. OCLC 9504560.

== See also ==
- Kim Kwang-hyop
- Kim Il Sung
- Zhou Baozhong

Political offices
Preceded by Kim Tu-bong	Head of State of North Korea; 20 September 1957 – 28 December 1972	Succeeded by Kim Il Sung as President of the Republic
Preceded by Kim Tu-bong	Chairmen of the Presidium of the Supreme People's Assembly; 1957–1972	Succeeded by Hwang Jang-yop
Preceded by —	Minister of People's Armed Forces; 7 February 1953 – 20 September 1957	Succeeded by Kim Kwang-hyop
Military offices
Preceded by New Office	Supreme Commander of the Korean People's Army; 8 February 1948 – 4 July 1950	Succeeded by Kim Il Sung
