= Kim Il (politician) =

North Korean politician (1910–1984)

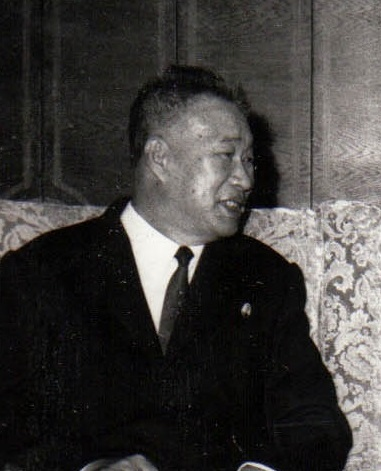
- Kim in 1974

First Vice President of North Korea
- In office 1 May 1976 – 9 March 1984
- President: Kim Il Sung
- Preceded by: Post established
- Succeeded by: Pak Song-chol

2nd Premier of North Korea
- In office 28 December 1972 – 19 April 1976
- Leader: Kim Il Sung
- Preceded by: Kim Il Sung
- Succeeded by: Pak Song-chol

First Vice Premier of North Korea
- In office March 1959 – 28 December 1972
- Leader: Kim Il Sung
- Preceded by: Office established
- Succeeded by: Kang Song-san

Vice Chairman of the Workers' Party of Korea Central Committee

4th term
- In office 18 September 1961 – 12 October 1966 Serving with Pak Kum-chol, Choe Yong-gon, Kim Chang-man and Yi Hyo-sun.
- Chairman: Kim Il Sung

2nd term
- In office 6 August 1953 – 23 March 1954 Serving with Pak Chang-ok and Pak Chong-ae.
- Chairman: Kim Il Sung

Personal details
- Born: 20 March 1910 Hamgyong Province, Korean Empire
- Died: 9 March 1984 (aged 73) Bucharest, SR Romania

Korean name
- Hangul: 김일
- Hanja: 金一
- RR: Gim Il
- MR: Kim Il

Kim Il (Korean: 김일; 20 March 1910 – 9 March 1984) was a North Korean politician who served as Premier of North Korea from 28 December 1972 to 19 April 1976.

== Early life and career ==
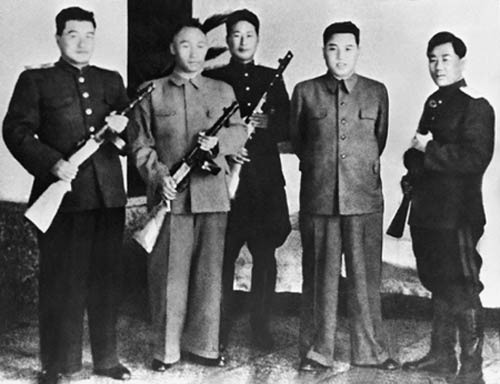
Choe Yong-gon, Kim Chaek, Kim Il, and Kang Kon receiving the first domestically produced Type 49 submachine guns from President Kim Il Sung, 1949.

Kim was born on 20 March 1910, in Hamgyong Province to a poor family of peasants. Kim joined the underground Communist Party in 1932 and fought against Japanese colonial rule from 1935. After the liberation of Korea in 1945, he served as secretary of the Party Committee of Pyongan Province. He was appointed to different important military posts since 1946. Kim Il was elected to the 1st Central Committee on 24 November 1946 and remained a member until his death. After the Democratic People's Republic of Korea proclaimed independence in 1948, he was elected to the 2nd Standing Committee of the Workers' Party of Korea (WPK) and in 1953 he was elected to the 2nd WPK Political Committee (later renamed "Presidium"). In 1954, he became the Minister of Agriculture in the North Korean Cabinet replacing Pak Mun-gyu. He was then appointed his country's First Vice Premier in 1956. Kim was elected a delegate to the 1st, 2nd, 3rd, 4th and 5th Supreme People's Assembly (SPA). By 1970, he was the highest-ranking member of WPK after Kim Il Sung and Choe Yong-gon.

In 1966, Kim Il Sung did not deliver his usual New Year's address. Although the reason is not definitely known, North Korean sources state that he was distracted by the news that Kim Il had been diagnosed with cancer and skipped the address to make arrangements for Kim's medical treatment.

In the 1960s, Kim furthered the North Korean position of independence from both the Soviet Union and China in the Sino-Soviet split. He tried to persuade Romania to stay out of Comecon like North Korea. Kim also took part in the negotiations of trade and defense pacts with the Soviet Union. By March 1967, he declared the conclusion of economic and military agreements with Moscow. He was named Premier in 1972 after Kim Il Sung gave up his premiership to become the President of North Korea. Kim Il was Premier until his resignation on 30 April 1976, due to failing health.

== Vice Presidency ==
Kim immediately became the Vice President, appointed by the SPA. His appointment was renewed on 15 December 1977. He served until his death in 1984, alongside Pak Sung-chul, also Vice President.

Kim was elected to the Presidium of the Politburo of the WPK at the 6th WPK Congress in 1980. At the Congress, Kim Il Sung had proposed Korean reunification under a "Democratic Federal Republic of Koryo", but only if the South Korean president Chun Doo-hwan was ousted. When Chun responded in his New Year's speech of 1981, asking Kim Il Sung to visit the South instead, Kim Il stepped in to denounce the South Korean administration and to call for all of Kim Il Sung's demands to be met before any dialogue could take place. Kim Il issued a statement, saying: "This is nothing but a foolish burlesque designed to whitewash [Chun's] dirty nation-splitting nature and gain public favor with the 'presidential election' at hand... As we have already announced clearly, Chun Doo Hwan is not a man worthy for us to do anything with... [The proposal is] a foolish act of a rogue who does not know where his place is." Kim said:

In the light of the present complicated North-South relations... it is clear to everyone that a possible time for general elections is far off, and moreover it is not logical to hold general elections according to principles of national self-determination and democratic procedure while leaving foreign troops and maintaining the military fascist system in South Korea as they are. As for the formation of a Consultative Conference for National Reunification with those who represent the will of the people, it can only be regarded as mere empty talk under the present state of harsh repression where the conscientious people who speak for the demands of the popular masses are all cast into prison and their political activities banned by law in South Korea.... The US troops must be withdrawn from South Korea, democratization carried out there and the anti-communist confrontation policy brought to an end.

We are ready to meet the present South Korea rulers even tomorrow, if they show their new start by their deeds, by removing these obstacles blocking the way of national reunification. In that case the reunification consultative body to be organized may take any form-be it a conference for promotion of national reunification or a consultative council for national unification, we will not be nervous about its name. We only hold that the authorities of the North and the South and representatives of different parties and groupings and of all strata at home and abroad should participate in it, and that all reunification proposals to be raised, including the proposal for the establishment of the Democratic Confederal Republic of Koryo, and immediate questions for developing North-South relations in the interests of national reunification should be discussed.

Three weeks later, Kim Il, in the capacity of Chairman of the Committee for the Peaceful Reunification of the Fatherland, demanded that a conference of 50 people representing the North and 50 the South should be organized. The proposal included the names of the desired Southern representatives, who included prominent politicians of parties banned in South Korea in 1980, but none from its ruling party.

Kim spent much of 1982 receiving medical treatment in Romania. Even after his reappearance in 1983, his health remained poor as evidenced by him missing numerous ceremonial gatherings. He died on 9 March 1984, aged 73. He was awarded a state funeral presided over by a 69-strong funeral committee. His death is said to have marked the end of the period of dominance of the "old guard" of political leaders who were with Kim Il Sung before he ascended to power. At the time of his death, Kim Il was ranked second only to Kim Il Sung and formally outranked even Kim Jong Il, Kim Il Sung's designated successor. Kim Il had been reportedly critical of Kim Jong Il. Nevertheless, KCNA called him the "closest and finest revolutionary comrade-in-arms" of Kim Il Sung and his death "a painful, big loss to our party and people".

== Works ==
- Kim Il (1964). "On the People's Economic Development Plan for 1968 for Carrying on More Successfully [sic] Economic Construction and Defence Upbuilding, in Face of the Obtaining Situation". Korea Today. (Supplement). No. 145. OCLC 122429262.
- — (1970). "Speech by First Vice-Premier Kim Il [Speeches at the Pyongyang Rally Marking the 'Day of Struggle Against U.S. Imperialism" (June 25, 1970)]". People of Asia: Unite and Drive the U.S. Agressors Out of Asia!. Peking: Foreign Languages Press. pp. 33–51. OCLC 204899.
- — (1974). On the Summing Up of the Implementation of the "Theses on the Socialist Rural Question in Our Country" Set Forth by the Respected and Beloved Leader Comrade Kim Il Sung and the Future Tasks: Report. Pyongyang: Foreign Languages Publishing House. OCLC 8344966.
- Kim Il; et al. (1981). Twenty-year-long Anti-Japanese Revolution Under the Red Sunrays: June 1926 – August 1931. Vol. 1. Pyongyang: Foreign Languages Publishing House. OCLC 873742698.
- —; et al. (1982). Twenty-year-long Anti-Japanese Revolution Under the Red Sunrays: September 1931 – February 1936. Vol. 2. Pyongyang: Foreign Languages Publishing House. OCLC 914716941.
- —; et al. (1984). Twenty-year-long Anti-Japanese Revolution Under the Red Sunrays: February 1936 – October 1938. Vol. 3. Pyongyang: Foreign Languages Publishing House. OCLC 923269976.
- —; et al. (1986). Twenty-year-long Anti-Japanese Revolution Under the Red Sunrays: November 1938 – August 1940. Vol. 4. Pyongyang: Foreign Languages Publishing House. OCLC 812696881.
- —; et al. (1988). Twenty-year-long Anti-Japanese Revolution Under the Red Sunrays: August 1940 – August 1945. Vol. 5. Pyongyang: Foreign Languages Publishing House. OCLC 812696872.
