= Chairman of the Standing Committee of the Supreme People's Assembly =

Government role in North Korea

- Emblem of North Korea

- Flag of North Korea
- Incumbent; Vacant since 20 June 2026
- Standing Committee of the Supreme People's Assembly
- Type: Presiding officer De facto/ceremonial head of state (1948–2019)
- Appointer: Supreme People's Assembly
- Term length: Same as the term of the Supreme People's Assembly
- Constituting instrument: Constitution of North Korea
- Inaugural holder: Kim Tu-bong
- Formation: 8 September 1948; 78 years ago
- Deputy: Vice Chairmen

- Chairman of the Standing Committee of the Supreme People's Assembly
- Chosŏn'gŭl: 최고인민회의 상임위원회 위원장
- Hancha: 最高人民會議 常任委員會 委員長
- Revised Romanization: Choego inmin hoeui sangim wiwonhoe wiwonjang
- McCune–Reischauer: Ch'oego inmin hoeŭi sangim wiwŏnhoe wiwŏnjang

The chairman of the Standing Committee of the Supreme People's Assembly, formerly known as the president of the Presidium of the Supreme People's Assembly, is the presiding officer of the Standing Committee of the Supreme People's Assembly, which is the permanent body of the Supreme People's Assembly, North Korea's supreme state organ of power. The chairman of the Supreme People's Assembly serves concurrently as the chairman of the SPA Standing Committee since 2026.

The chairman organizes and guides the work of the Standing Committee, and presides over its work. The chairman is assisted by vice chairpersons and a secretary-general, who together comprise the Permanent Committee of the Standing Committee, The chairman is also, along with all other members of the SPA Standing Committee, a member of the Plenary Meeting of the Standing Committee.

The position is vacant since 20 June 2026 with a new chairman expected to be elected at a future session of the assembly.

== History ==
The 1948 Constitution created the position of Chairman of the Standing Committee of the Supreme People's Assembly. The chairman presided over the Standing Committee of the Supreme People's Assembly, which was given the power to ratify or annul treaties with foreign countries, appoint or recall ambassadors to foreign countries and receive letters of credentials or recall of foreign diplomatic representatives. Nominally, the Chairman of the SPA Standing Committee held the highest state post followed by the premier, Kim Il Sung. The formal powers of the office led some to argue the chairman of the SPA Standing Committee was effectively the head of state of North Korea, though the office was never legally defined as such. Instead, starting from 1968, North Korean state media started referring Premier Kim Il Sung as the head of state.

The 1972 Constitution created the position of President of North Korea who is tasked with being the country's head of state. The Chairman of the Standing Committee of the Supreme People's Assembly (under the new Korean title of 최고인민회의 상설회의 의장) was removed of its power to represent the state and was limited to doing legislative work as the concurrent chairman of the Supreme People's Assembly. The 1998 revision of the 1972 Constitution created the position under the new English translation of President of the Presidium of the Supreme People's Assembly with its powers to represent the state restored, though the office was again not legally referred to as the head of state.

The 1972 Constitution was revised in April 2019 to designate the then-Chairman of the State Affairs Commission as the supreme leader, with the powers reserved to the head of state being transferred to the SAC chairman in August of the same year. In February 2022, the Chairman of the State Affairs Commission began to be referred in English as the President of the State Affairs. This led to the President of the Presidium of the Supreme People's Assembly being referred in English to its previous title of Chairman of the Standing Committee of the Supreme People's Assembly.

The Constitution was revised again in 2026. The new amendments stipulated that the chairman of the Supreme People's Assembly serves concurrently as the chairman of the SPA Standing Committee. Additionally, they transferred the powers to receive credentials and letters of recall of diplomatic representatives accredited by foreign countries to the president of the State Affairs Commission.

== List of office holders ==
No.	Portrait	Name (Birth–Death)	Term of office			Party	SPA
No.	Portrait	Name (Birth–Death)	Took office	Left office	Time in office	Party	SPA
1		Kim Tu-bong 김두봉 (1889–1958)	8 September 1948	20 September 1957	9 years, 12 days	Workers' Party of North Korea (until 1949)	1st
1		Kim Tu-bong 김두봉 (1889–1958)	8 September 1948	20 September 1957	9 years, 12 days	Workers' Party of Korea (from 1949)	1st
2		Choe Yong-gon 최용건 (1900–1976)	20 September 1957	28 December 1972	15 years, 99 days	Korean Social Democratic Party	2nd
2		Choe Yong-gon 최용건 (1900–1976)	20 September 1957	28 December 1972	15 years, 99 days	Korean Social Democratic Party	3rd
2		Choe Yong-gon 최용건 (1900–1976)	20 September 1957	28 December 1972	15 years, 99 days	Korean Social Democratic Party	4th
3		Hwang Jang-yop 황장엽 (1923–2010)	28 December 1972	7 April 1983	10 years, 100 days	Workers' Party of Korea	5th
3		Hwang Jang-yop 황장엽 (1923–2010)	28 December 1972	7 April 1983	10 years, 100 days	Workers' Party of Korea	6th
3		Hwang Jang-yop 황장엽 (1923–2010)	28 December 1972	7 April 1983	10 years, 100 days	Workers' Party of Korea	7th
4		Yang Hyong-sop 양형섭 (1925–2022)	7 April 1983	5 September 1998	15 years, 151 days	Workers' Party of Korea	7th
4		Yang Hyong-sop 양형섭 (1925–2022)	7 April 1983	5 September 1998	15 years, 151 days	Workers' Party of Korea	8th
4		Yang Hyong-sop 양형섭 (1925–2022)	7 April 1983	5 September 1998	15 years, 151 days	Workers' Party of Korea	9th
5		Kim Yong-nam 김영남 (1928–2025)	5 September 1998	11 April 2019	20 years, 218 days	Workers' Party of Korea	10th
5		Kim Yong-nam 김영남 (1928–2025)	5 September 1998	11 April 2019	20 years, 218 days	Workers' Party of Korea	11th
5		Kim Yong-nam 김영남 (1928–2025)	5 September 1998	11 April 2019	20 years, 218 days	Workers' Party of Korea	12th
5		Kim Yong-nam 김영남 (1928–2025)	5 September 1998	11 April 2019	20 years, 218 days	Workers' Party of Korea	13th
6		Choe Ryong-hae 최룡해 (born 1950)	11 April 2019	22 March 2026	6 years, 345 days	Workers' Party of Korea	14th
7		Jo Yong-won 조용원 (born 1957)	22 March 2026	20 June 2026	90 days	Workers' Party of Korea	15th
Vacant (since 20 June 2026)							15th
