= Commander-in-Chief of North Korea =

Head of North Korea's armed forces

Commander-in-Chief of the Armed Forces of the Democratic People's Republic of Korea
- 조선민주주의인민공화국무력 총사령관
- Emblem of the Korean People's Army

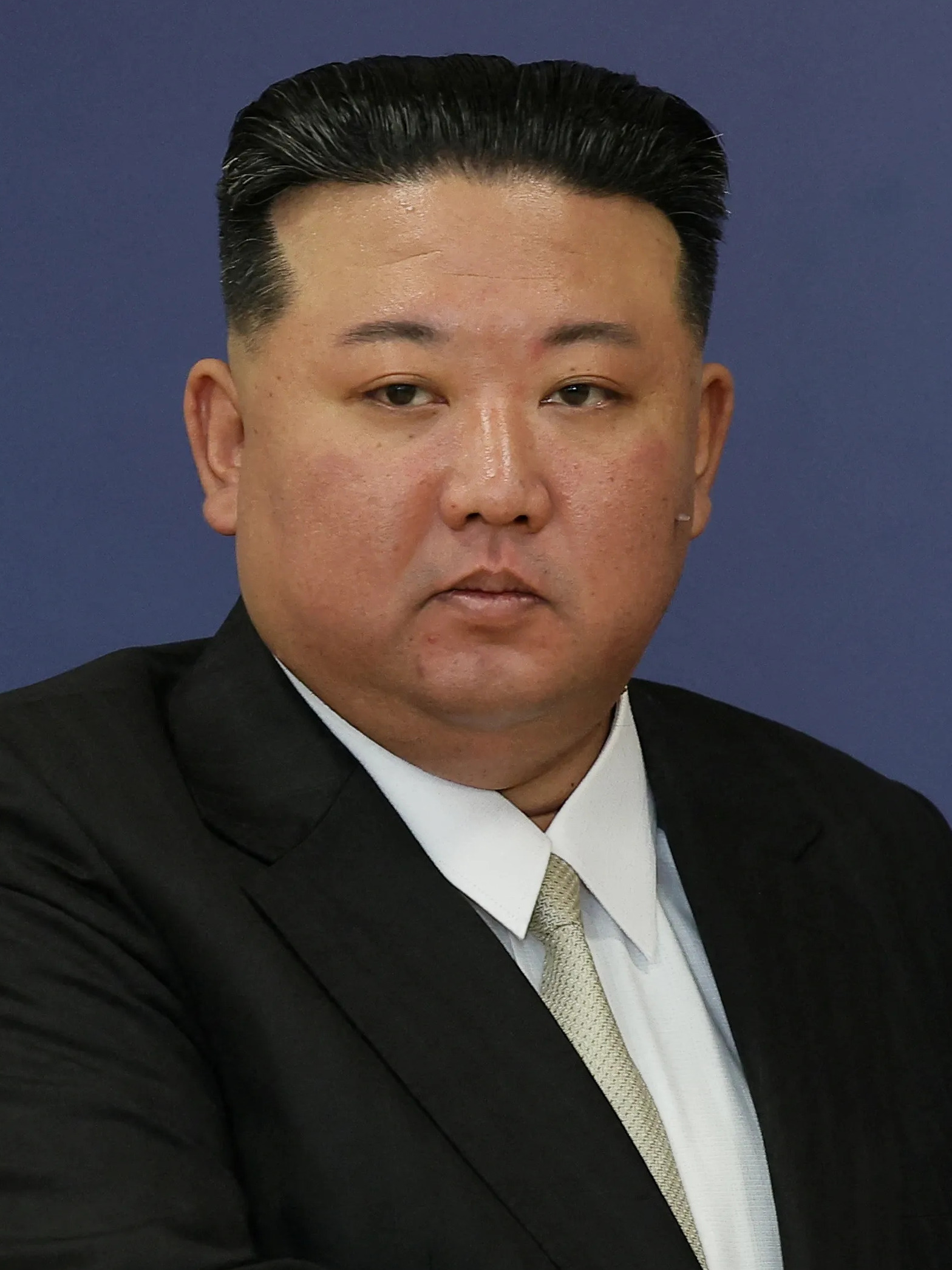
- Incumbent; Kim Jong Un since 17 December 2011
- Korean People's Army
- Style: Comrade Supreme Commander
- Formation: 8 February 1948
- First holder: Choe Yong-gon

- Supreme Commander of the Armed Forces of North Korea
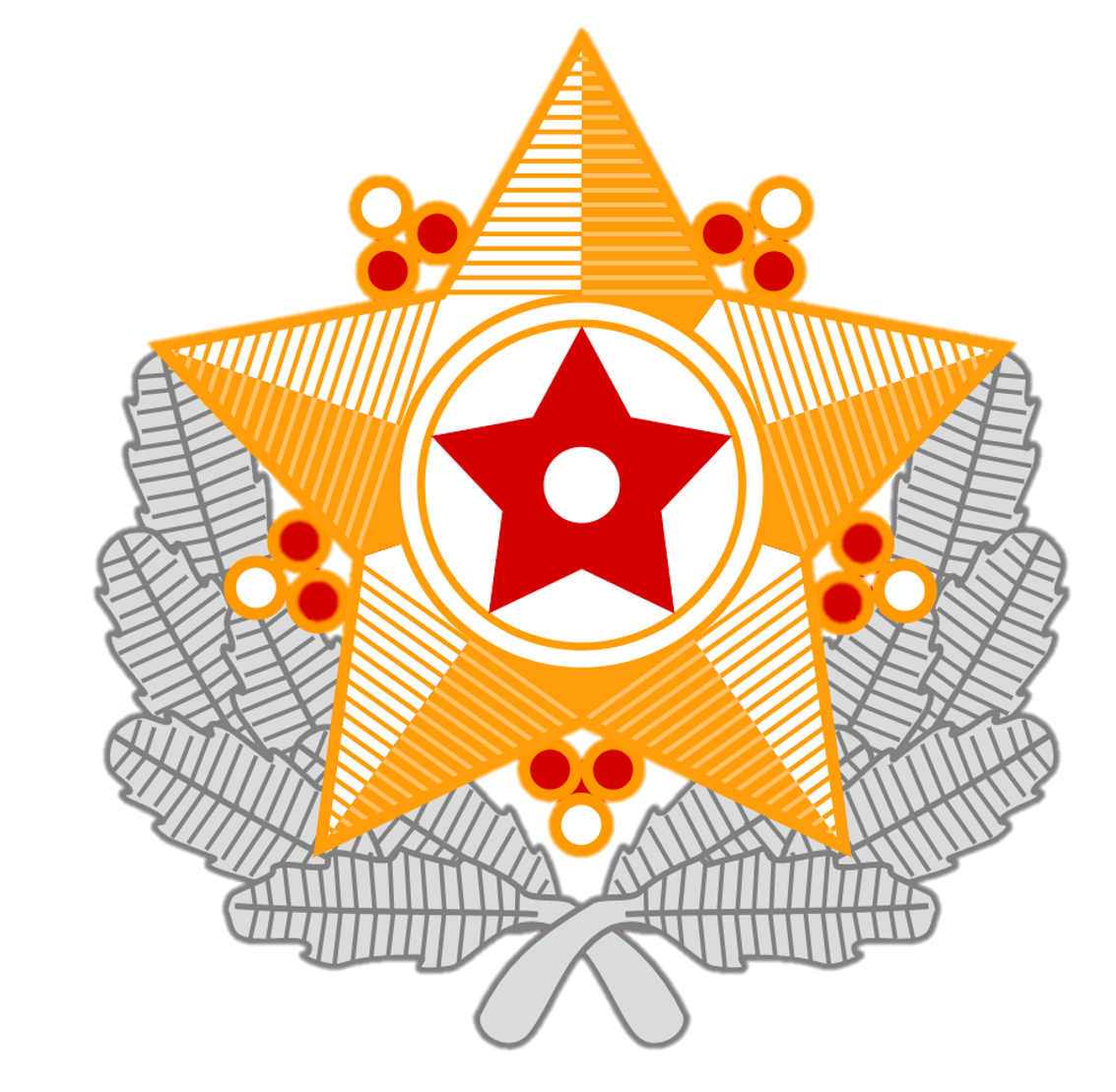
- Emblem of the Supreme Commander of the Korean People's Army until 2022; since 2022 its usage has become depreciated.

Supreme Commander of the Armed Forces of North Korea
- Hangul: 조선민주주의인민공화국 무력 최고사령관
- Hanja: 朝鮮民主主義人民共和國 武力 最高司令官
- RR: Joseon minjujuui inmin gonghwaguk muryeok choego saryeonggwan
- MR: Chosŏn minjujuŭi inmin konghwaguk muryŏk ch'oego saryŏnggwan

The Commander-in-Chief of the Armed Forces of Democratic People's Republic of Korea (Korean: 조선민주주의인민공화국무력 총사령관) is the commander-in-chief of the Korean People's Army, the military of North Korea. The office was established on 4 July 1950 and abolished with the passing of a new constitution in 1972. Since then, the office of President of North Korea, the Chairman of the National Defence Commission and the President of the State Affairs Commission have been referred to as supreme commanders in accordance with the constitution.

As such, the only officeholder is Kim Il Sung. But the title has been bestowed on both Kim Jong Il and Kim Jong Un, and legally enforced through the offices of Chairman of the National Defense Commission and President of the State Affairs Commission respectively. All officeholders are also the General Secretary of the Workers' Party of Korea and Chairman of the Central Military Commission of the Workers' Party of Korea.

== History ==
=== As an office (1950–1972) ===
The position was first known as the Chief Commander of the Korean People's Army (조선인민군 총사령관) which was established on 8 February 1948 along with the founding of the Korean People's Army. Minister of National Defence Choe Yong-gon was appointed to this position.

On 4 July 1950, the 1st Standing Committee of the 1st Supreme People's Assembly issued a decree which created the position Supreme Commander of the Korean People's Army (조선인민군 최고사령관) with Kim Il Sung being appointed to the position. This was part of the reorganization of the Korean People's Army during the North Korean invasion of South Korea at the initial stages of the Korean War.

Following the end of the Korean War, Kim Il Sung continued to exercise his powers as KPA Supreme Commander.

=== As a title (1972–present) ===
A new constitution was adopted in 1972 which stated that the President of North Korea is the supreme commander of the country's armed forces as well as the Chairman of the National Defense Commission.

On 24 December 1991, Kim Jong Il was appointed as the KPA Supreme Commander at the 19th plenary session of the 6th Central Committee of the Workers' Party of Korea. This appointment was part of the succession of Kim Jong Il, who was elected to the position of first vice chairman of the National Defense Commission on 22 May 1990.

Following Kim Jong Il's appointment as KPA Supreme Commander, a 1992 constitutional amendment removed any mention of the position of supreme commander. The amendment stated instead that the Chairman of the National Defense Commission has the power to command the country's armed forces. It also stated that the President is not automatically the Chairman of the National Defense Commission. This allowed for Kim Jong Il's election as Chairman of the National Defense Commission on 9 April 1993.

A 2009 constitutional amendment mentioned the position of supreme commander again and vested it in the Chairman of the National Defense Commission.

Kim Jong Il served as supreme commander until his death on 17 December 2011. Following this, Kim Jong Un was appointed as KPA Supreme Commander on 17 December 2011 by the Political Bureau of the Central Committee of the Workers' Party of Korea in accordance to Kim Jong Il's final instructions. At the time of his appointment as KPA Supreme Commander, he was the vice chairman of the Central Military Commission of the Workers' Party of Korea.

On 13 April 2012, the constitution was amended to transfer the powers of supreme commander to the First Chairman of the National Defense Commission to which Kim Jong Un was elected. Kim Jong Un was later elected as President of the State Affairs Commission on 29 June 2016 to which the powers of supreme commander were transferred to.

On 15 April 2015, Kim Jong Un began to be referred to as Supreme Commander of the Armed Forces of the Democratic People's Republic of Korea despite the constitution designating him as commander-in-chief of the country's armed forces.

Standard of the Supreme Commander until 2022

The constitution was revised on 12 April 2019 which replaced the mention of "supreme commander" with "commander-in-chief."
