= Ri Jong-ok =

North Korean politician (1916–1999)

- 리종옥
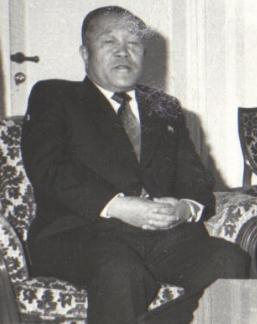
- Ri in 1979

Vice President of North Korea
- In office 16 January 1984 – October 1997 Serving with Pak Song-chol, Lim Chum-chu, Kim Yong-ju and Kim Pyong-sik.
- President: Kim Il Sung

4th Premier of North Korea
- In office 15 December 1977 – 27 January 1984
- President: Kim Il Sung
- Preceded by: Pak Song-chol
- Succeeded by: Kang Song-san

Chairman of the State Planning Commission
- In office 16 January 1956 – July 1959
- Premier: Kim Il Sung
- Preceded by: Pak Song-chol
- Succeeded by: Kang Song-san

Personal details
- Born: 10 January 1916 Kankyōhoku-dō (North Hamgyong Province), Korea, Empire of Japan
- Died: 23 September 1999 (aged 83) Pyongyang, North Korea

Korean name
- Hangul: 리종옥
- Hanja: 李鍾玉
- RR: Ri Jongok
- MR: Ri Chongok

Ri Jong-ok (10 January 1916 – 23 September 1999) was a North Korean politician who served as the premier of North Korea from 1977 to 1984.

He was elected to the Presidium at the 6th WPK Congress in 1980.

He was appointed as Vice President of North Korea by the Supreme People's Assembly in January 1984 and he left the office in October 1997.

Ri died on 23 September 1999. On his funeral committee were Kim Yong-nam, Pak Song-chol, Hong Song-nam and others. He was the recipient of the Order of Kim Il Sung, Order of the National Flag (first class), Order of Freedom and Independence (first class) and other honors.

== See also ==
- Politics of North Korea
