= Eternal leaders of North Korea =

Posthumous title of North Korea

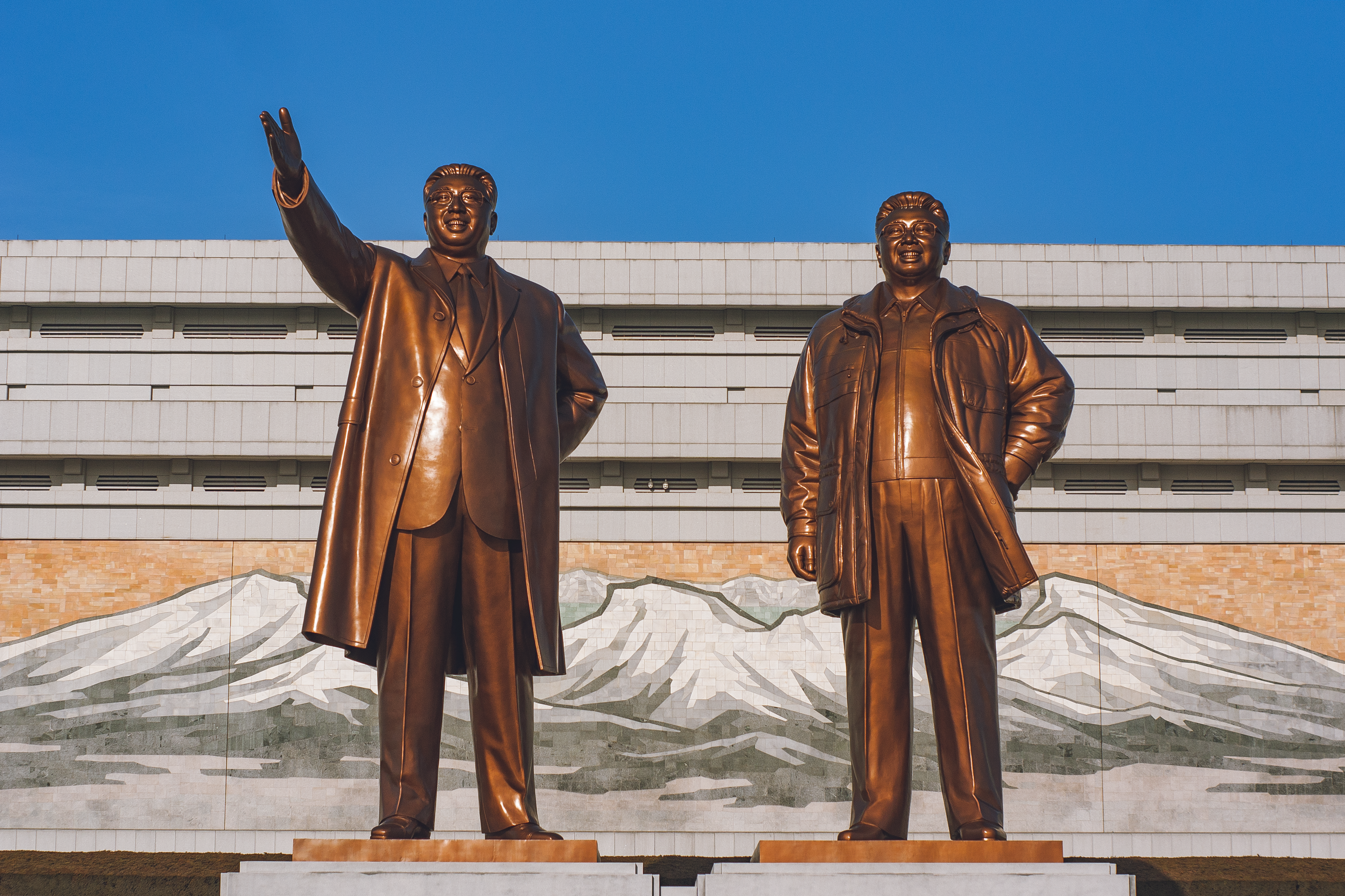
- Bronze statues of former leaders Kim Il Sung (left) and Kim Jong Il (right) at the Mansu Hill Grand Monument

Korean name
- Hangul: 주체조선의 영원한 수령
- Hanja: 主體朝鮮의 永遠한 首領
- Lit.: Eternal leaders of Juche Korea
- RR: Juchejoseonui yeongwonhan suryeong
- MR: Chuch'ejosŏnŭi yŏngwŏnhan suryŏng

The eternal leaders of North Korea or eternal leaders of Korea (officially the eternal leaders of Juche Korea) are honorary titles that are posthumously bestowed upon deceased leaders of North Korea. The phrase was used in a line of the preamble to the Constitution, as amended on June 30, 2016, and in subsequent revisions.

It reads (in the original version):

Under the leadership of the Workers' Party of Korea, the Democratic People's Republic of Korea and the Korean people will uphold the Great Leader Comrade Kim Il Sung as the eternal President of the Democratic People's Republic of Korea and Comrade Kim Jong Il as the eternal Chairman of the National Defence Commission of the Democratic People's Republic of Korea [...]

— Constitution of North Korea

== History of the title ==
=== Presidency of North Korea before 1994 ===
The post of "President of the Democratic People's Republic of Korea" was established in the Constitution of North Korea in 1972. Until then, Kim Il Sung held the posts of premier and general secretary of the Workers' Party of Korea.

In 1972, the presidency was established, and Kim Il Sung was elected to the position by the Supreme People's Assembly, the North Korean legislature, on December 28, 1972. Kim served as president until 1994 when he died, and the position was left vacant and his son and successor Kim Jong Il was not given the title.

=== "Eternal President" ===
The preamble of the Constitution of the Democratic People's Republic of Korea as amended on September 5, 1998, reads:

Under the leadership of the Workers' Party of Korea, the Democratic People's Republic of Korea and the Korean people will hold the great leader Comrade Kim Il Sung in high esteem as the eternal President of the Republic [...]

The president was the de jure head of state of North Korea, but whose powers were exercised by the "sacred leader" of the nation's state ideology called Juche. According to Ashley J. Tellis and Michael Wills, this amendment to the preamble was an indication of the unique North Korean characteristic of being a theocratic state based on the personality cult surrounding Kim Il Sung. In addition, North Korea adopted a Juche calendar dating from 1912, the year of Kim Il Sung's birth.

The 2012 constitution once again referred to Kim Il Sung as the "Eternal President of the Democratic People's Republic of Korea".

=== "Eternal General Secretary" / "Eternal Chairman" ===
After the death of Kim Jong Il, the constitution was amended in 2012, declaring him Eternal General Secretary of the Workers' Party of Korea and Eternal Chairman of the National Defence Commission.

In 2016, the title "eternal leaders of Juche Korea" was introduced by amending the preamble of the constitution, and it was given to Kim Il Sung and Kim Jong Il.

== Head of state role in North Korea after the deaths of Kim Il Sung and Kim Jong Il ==
The functions and powers previously belonging to the president were divided between numerous officials: the premier of North Korea; the chairman of the Supreme People's Assembly, chairman of the Standing Committee of the Supreme People's Assembly; and the head of the military, the chairman of the National Defence Commission (replaced by State Affairs Commission of North Korea in 2016) and supreme commander of the Korean People's Army. These positions are currently held by Pak Thae-song, Jo Yong-won, and Kim Jong Un respectively.

== See also ==
- Death and state funeral of Kim Il Sung
- Death and state funeral of Kim Jong Il
- Kim family (North Korea)
- Kim Il Sung bibliography
- List of things named after Kim Il Sung
- North Korean cult of personality
- President for life
- Propaganda in North Korea
- Vice President of North Korea

== Bibliography ==
- Jong Il, Kim (1994). Let Us Hold the Great Leader Comrade Kim Il Sung in High Esteem as the Eternal President of Our Republic.
