= Vice President of North Korea =

1972–1998 political position in North Korea

Vice President of the Democratic People’s Republic of Korea
- Status: Abolished
- Formation: 28 December 1972
- First holder: Choe Yong-gon
- Final holder: Kim Yong-ju
- Abolished: 5 September 1998

The Vice President of the Democratic People's Republic of Korea (Korean: 조선민주주의인민공화국 부주석) was a political position in North Korea established in 1972, and abolished after the death of Kim Il Sung during the reign of Kim Jong Il.

In 1972 the Presidency was established, and Kim Il Sung was elected to the position by the Supreme People's Assembly, the North Korean legislature, on 28 December 1972. The Vice Presidents were also elected by the Assembly. The Vice Presidency has been left vacant since October 1997, when the Presidency was eternally reserved for Kim Il Sung.

== List of vice presidents of North Korea ==
No.	Portrait	Name (Birth–Death)	Term of office		Party	President	SPA
No.	Portrait	Name (Birth–Death)	Took office	Left office	Party	President	SPA
1		Choe Yong-gon 최용건 (1900–1976)	28 December 1972	19 September 1976	Workers' Party of Korea	Kim Il Sung	5th
2		Kang Ryang-uk 강량욱 (1903–1983)	28 December 1972	16 December 1977	Korean Social Democratic Party	Kim Il Sung	5th
3		Kim Tong-gyu 김동규 (1915–unknown)	30 November 1974	16 December 1977	Workers' Party of Korea	Kim Il Sung	5th
4		Kim Il 김일 (1910–1984)	19 April 1976	16 December 1977	Workers' Party of Korea	Kim Il Sung	5th
(4)		Kim Il 김일 (1910–1984)	16 December 1977	5 April 1982	Workers' Party of Korea	Kim Il Sung	6th
(2)		Kang Ryang-uk 강량욱 (1903–1983)	16 December 1977	5 April 1982	Korean Social Democratic Party	Kim Il Sung	6th
5		Pak Song-chol 박성철 (1913–2008)	16 December 1977	5 April 1982	Workers' Party of Korea	Kim Il Sung	6th
(4)		Kim Il 김일 (1910–1984)	5 April 1982	25 January 1984	Workers' Party of Korea	Kim Il Sung	7th
(2)		Kang Ryang-uk 강량욱 (1903–1983)	5 April 1982	9 January 1983	Korean Social Democratic Party	Kim Il Sung	7th
(5)		Pak Song-chol 박성철 (1913–2008)	5 April 1982	30 December 1986	Workers' Party of Korea	Kim Il Sung	7th
6		Rim Chun-chu 림춘추 (1912–1988)	7 April 1983	30 December 1986	Workers' Party of Korea	Kim Il Sung	7th
7		Ri Jong-ok 리종옥 (1916–1999)	27 January 1984	30 December 1986	Workers' Party of Korea	Kim Il Sung	7th
(5)		Pak Song-chol 박성철 (1913–2008)	30 December 1986	26 May 1990	Workers' Party of Korea	Kim Il Sung	8th
(7)		Ri Jong-ok 리종옥 (1916–1999)	30 December 1986	26 May 1990	Workers' Party of Korea	Kim Il Sung	8th
(6)		Rim Chun-chu 림춘추 (1912–1988)	30 December 1986	27 April 1988	Workers' Party of Korea	Kim Il Sung	8th
(5)		Pak Song-chol 박성철 (1913–2008)	26 May 1990	5 September 1998	Workers' Party of Korea	Kim Il Sung (until 1994) Vacant (from 1994)	9th
(7)		Ri Jong-ok 리종옥 (1916–1999)	26 May 1990	5 September 1998	Workers' Party of Korea	Kim Il Sung (until 1994) Vacant (from 1994)	9th
8		Kim Pyong-sik 김병식 (1919–1999)	11 December 1993	5 September 1998	Korean Social Democratic Party	Kim Il Sung (until 1994) Vacant (from 1994)	9th
9		Kim Yong-ju 김영주 (1920–2021)	11 December 1993	5 September 1998	Workers' Party of Korea	Kim Il Sung (until 1994) Vacant (from 1994)	9th

== See also ==
- Vice President of South Korea
