= 1977 North Korean parliamentary election =

← 1972	11 November 1977	1982 →

All 579 seats in the Supreme People's Assembly
Party	Seats	+/–
Fatherland Front	579	+38
This lists parties that won seats. See the complete results below.
President before	President after
Kim Il Sung; Workers' Party	Kim Il Sung; Workers' Party

Parliamentary elections were held in North Korea on 11 November 1977 to elect the 579 members of the sixth Supreme People's Assembly. In the first session of the parliament that was formed that year, the second seven-year economic development plan (1978–1984) was approved. Another topic on the agenda was "Let us Further Strengthen the People's Government", which was released on 15 December.

== Results ==
Alliance	Votes	%	Seats
Fatherland Front		100	579
Total			579
Registered voters/turnout		100	
Source: Yonhap
