= Central People's Committee =

Central People's Committee of the Democratic People's Republic of Korea
- 조선민주주의인민공화국 중앙인민위원회

Commission overview
- Formed: 1972; 53 years ago
- Dissolved: 1998; 27 years ago
- Superseding Commission: National Defense Commission
- Jurisdiction: Government of the Democratic People's Republic of Korea

The Central People's Committee of the Democratic People's Republic of Korea was the highest state institution for policymaking in North Korea from 1972 to 1998.

== Composition ==
The Central People's Committee consisted of a chairman, vice-chairmen, secretary-general and members. Under the Constitution, the President of North Korea served as the chairman of the Central People's Committee, with the Vice President serving as its vice chairman. Members of the Central People's Committee, including the President and Vice President, were elected by the Supreme People's Assembly (SPA), with terms of office set at four years under the 1972 Constitution and five years under the 1992 Constitution. The 1972 Constitution also provided for the Vice President, Secretary-General of the Central People's Committee, and members (25 members at the time of its establishment) to be elected by the SPA at the proposal of the President.

The chairman of the Central People's Committee was President Kim Il Sung from the time the committee was established. After Kim Il Sung's death on July 8, 1994 , the position remained vacant until the committee was abolished in 1998. The 1972 Constitution established the following departmental committees of the Central People's Committee: the Internal Policy Committee, the Foreign Policy Committee, the National Defense Committee, the Judicial and Security Committee, the Legislation Committee, and the Economic Policy Committee. However, the 1992 constitutional amendment separated the National Defense Committee from the Central People's Committee.

== Powers and responsibilities ==
The establishment of the Committee strengthened Kim Il Sung's power during his tenure as the supreme leader. The Central People's Committee was regarded as "the organ by which Kim Il Sung strengthened centralized power" and was a "semi-political and semi-party" organ by which Kim Il Sung promoted his "sole leadership system". After the establishment of the Central People's Committee, the number of meetings of the Central Committee of the Workers' Party of Korea, which was originally used to discuss important policies and make decisions, was significantly reduced. Instead, the Central People's Committee replaced the Workers' Party of Korea in making decisions on national policies and guidelines. If a member of the Politburo of the Workers' Party of Korea was not elected as a member of the Central People's Committee, they were regarded by the outside observers as having lost power. Kim Il Sung's power base as the supreme leader shifted from the Workers' Party to the Central People's Committee as a state institution. After Kim Il Sung's death, power was transferred to the National Defense Commission led by Kim Jong Il.

=== 1972 Constitution ===
- Establish the country's domestic and foreign policies.
- Guide the work of the Administration Council, local people's assemblies and people's committees.
- Guide the work of judicial and procuratorial organs.
- Guide national defense and national political security work.
- Oversee the implementation of the Constitution, the decrees of the Supreme People's Assembly, the orders of the President of the State, and the decrees, decisions, and instructions of the Central People's Committee, and to repeal decisions and instructions of state organs that violate regulations.
- Establish the "provinces" as constituent departments of the Administration Council and the "ministries" as individual executive agencies will be changed.
- Appoint and remove the Vice Premiers, ministers and other members of the Administration Council based on the proposal of the Premier of the Administration Council.
- Appoint or recall ambassadors and ministers stationed abroad.
- Appoint and dismiss important military officers, and confer military titles.
- Establish medals, honorary titles, military titles, and diplomatic ranks, and confer medals and honorary titles.
- Grant general amnesty
- Change administrative region.
- In a state of emergency, a state of war is declared and a mobilization order is issued.
- issue decrees, decisions, and instructions from the Central People's Committee.

=== 1992 Constitution ===
- Formulate national policies and measures for implementation.
- Guide the work of the State Council, local people's assemblies and people's committees.
- Guide the work of judicial and procuratorial organs.
- Guide state organs in complying with and implementing laws and regulations, and to raise issues encountered in the implementation of laws and regulations.
- Oversee the implementation of the Constitution, decrees and decisions of the Supreme People's Assembly, decisions and instructions of the Standing Session of the Supreme People's Assembly, orders of the President of the State, decisions and orders of the National Defense Commission, and decrees and decisions of the Central People's Committee; to suspend the implementation of local people's assembly decisions that violate regulations; and to repeal decisions and instructions of state organs that violate regulations.
- Establish or abolish the provincial, ministerial, and commissional departments that make up the State Council.
- During the recess of the Supreme People's Assembly, upon the proposal of the Prime Minister of the State Council, the appointment and removal of Deputy Prime Ministers, Ministers, Chairpersons of the Standing Committee, and other members of the State Council are carried out.
- Appoint and remove members of the special committees of the Central People's Committee.
- Ratify or abrogate major treaties concluded with foreign countries.
- Decide on the appointment or recall of diplomatic representatives stationed abroad.
- Establish and confer medals, awards, honorary titles, and diplomatic ranks.
- Exercise the power of amnesty.
- Establishment and alteration of administrative regions.
- Issue decrees, decisions, and instructions from the Central People's Committee.
