= President of North Korea =

Head of state of North Korea

President of the Democratic People's Republic of Korea
- 조선민주주의인민공화국 주석
- Emblem of North Korea

- Flag of North Korea

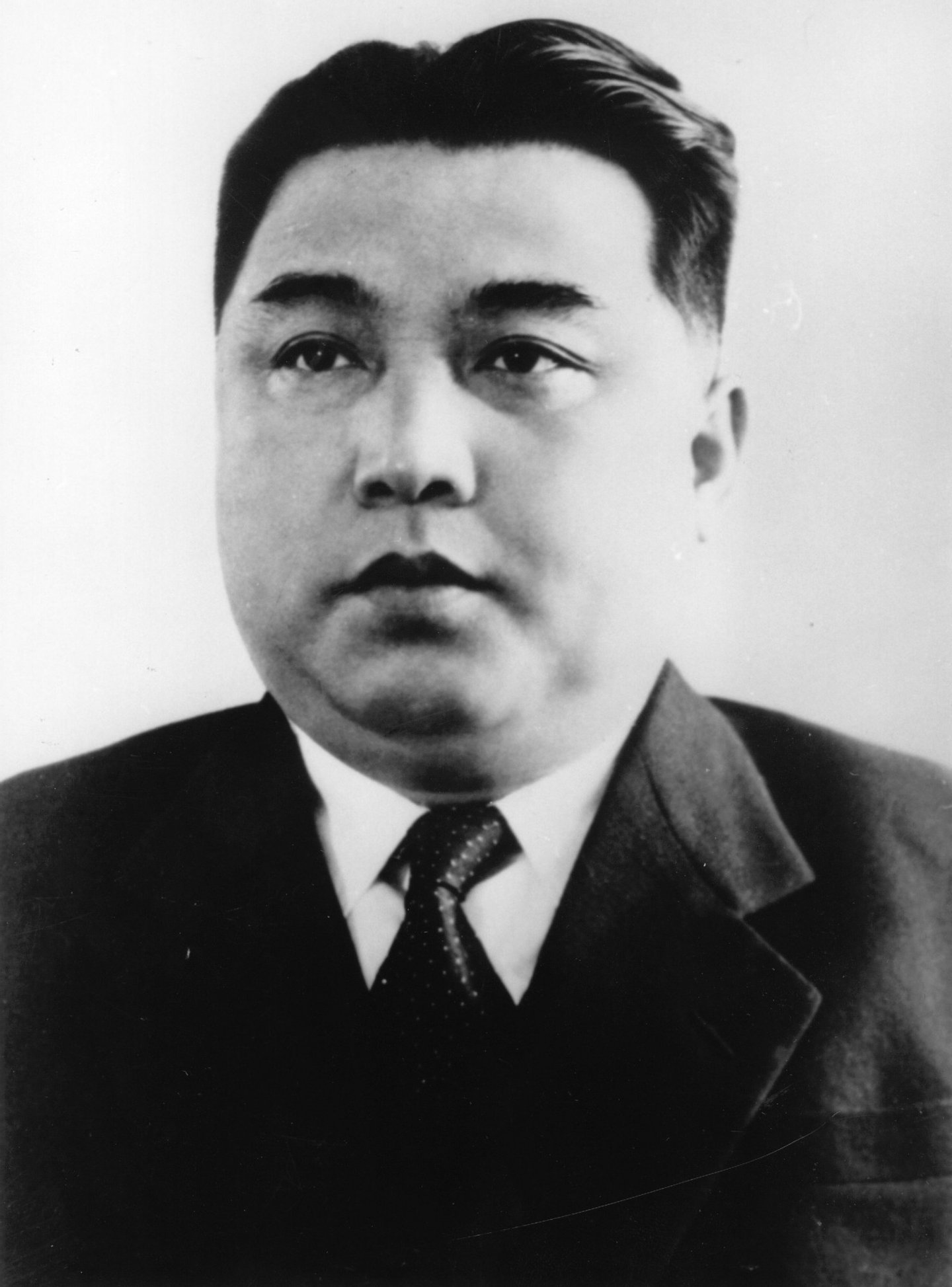
- Only officeholder Kim Il Sung; 28 December 1972 – 8 July 1994
- Member of: Central People's Committee
- Residence: Kumsusan Assembly Hall
- Seat: Pyongyang
- Appointer: Supreme People's Assembly
- Term length: Four years, renewable (until 1992); Five years, renewable (from 1992)
- Constituting instrument: Constitution of North Korea (1972)
- Formation: 27 December 1972
- First holder: Kim Il Sung
- Final holder: Kim Il Sung
- Abolished: 5 September 1998
- Deputy: Vice President of North Korea

The president of the Democratic People's Republic of Korea (Korean: 조선민주주의인민공화국 주석) was the head of state of North Korea from 1972 to 1998. The position was only occupied by Kim Il Sung from 1972 until his death in 1994. Aside from being president, Kim was also the General Secretary of the Workers' Party of Korea, Chairman of the National Defence Commission (until 1993) and Supreme Commander of the Korean People's Army (until 1991).

Following his death in 1994, the position remained vacant until 1998; his son Kim Jong Il was not given the title to succeed him. A constitutional amendment in 1998 named Kim Il Sung as the eternal president and abolished the position.

== Election ==
The 1972 Constitution stated that the president was elected by the Supreme People's Assembly for a term of four years. A constitutional amendment in 1992 increased the president's term to five years which coincides with the term of the Supreme People's Assembly.

The constitution did not set a limit on how many times the president may be re-elected, nor did it define a line of succession, or even who would be acting president if the President is unavailable or the office of President is vacant.

== Powers ==
The 1972 Constitution stated that the president was the head of state who represents the state's power.

The president was the head of the Central People's Committee which was primarily responsible for setting North Korea's domestic policies. In necessary cases, the president could also have guided the meetings of the Administration Council.

The president had the power to control the country's armed forces as the supreme commander of the armed forces and the chairman of the National Defense Commission.

The president had the power to nominate the Vice President or Vice Presidents, the secretary general and members of the Central People's Committee and the Premier, who were then to be elected by the Supreme People's Assembly.

The president promulgated the ordinances of the Supreme People's Assembly, the decrees of the Central People's Committee and the decisions of the Standing Committee of the Supreme People's Assembly. The president was also given the power to introduce agenda items in the sessions of the Supreme People's Assembly and to issue orders.

The president had the power to ratify or nullify international treaties. The president was also tasked with receiving letters of credentials or recall from foreign ambassadors.

The president had the power to exercise the power of special pardon.

The 1992 amendment of the 1972 Constitution introduced changes to the powers of the president. The amendment no longer made it possible for the president to automatically become the chairman of the National Defense Commission, who was tasked with the control of the country's armed forces.

The president's power to conclude international treaties was transferred to the Central People's Committee. Instead, the president was tasked with promulgating ratified or nullified international treaties.

The president was given the additional power to appoint or recall the country's ambassadors and ministers to other countries, which was a power that previously belonged to the Central People's Committee.

In practice, Kim derived most of his power from his post as leader of the WPK.

== List of presidents ==
No.	Portrait	Name (Birth–Death)	Term of office		Party	SPA
No.	Portrait	Name (Birth–Death)	Took office	Left office	Party	SPA
1		Kim Il Sung 김일성 (1912–1994)	28 December 1972	8 July 1994	Workers' Party of Korea	5th
1		Kim Il Sung 김일성 (1912–1994)	28 December 1972	8 July 1994	Workers' Party of Korea	6th
1		Kim Il Sung 김일성 (1912–1994)	28 December 1972	8 July 1994	Workers' Party of Korea	7th
1		Kim Il Sung 김일성 (1912–1994)	28 December 1972	8 July 1994	Workers' Party of Korea	8th
1		Kim Il Sung 김일성 (1912–1994)	28 December 1972	8 July 1994	Workers' Party of Korea	9th
Vacant (8 July 1994–5 September 1998)						9th

== See also ==
- Vice President of North Korea
- General Secretary of the Workers' Party of Korea
