= Pak Song-chol =

North Korean politician (1913–2008)

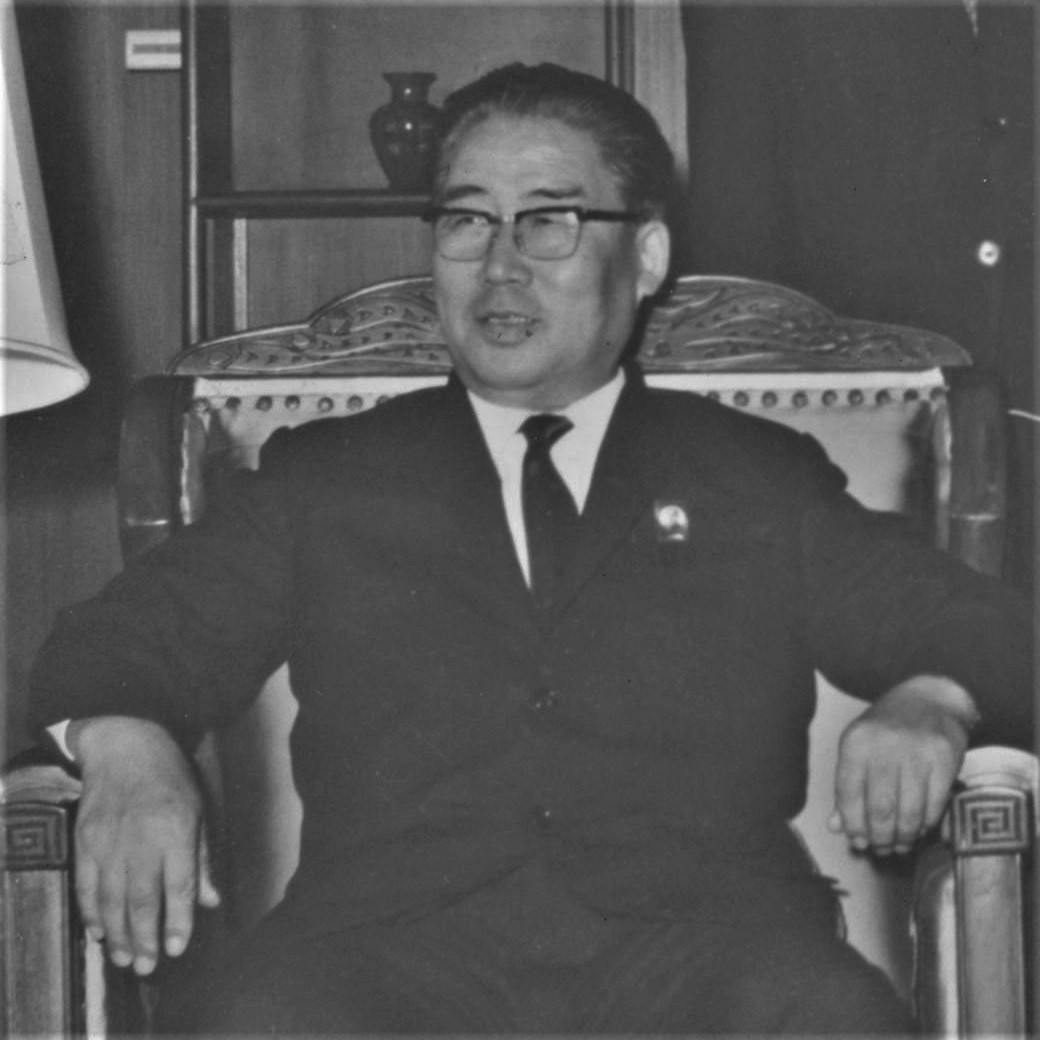
- Pak in 1973

First Vice President of North Korea
- In office 15 December 1977 – 5 September 1998
- President: Kim Il Sung

3rd Premier of North Korea
- In office 19 April 1976 – 16 December 1977
- President: Kim Il Sung
- Preceded by: Kim Il
- Succeeded by: Ri Jong-ok

Minister of Foreign Affairs
- In office 23 October 1959 – 1 July 1970
- Premier: Kim Il Sung
- Preceded by: Nam Il
- Succeeded by: Ho Dam

Personal details
- Born: 2 September 1913 Keishū, Keishōhoku-dō, Korea, Empire of Japan, (today Gyeongju, North Gyeongsang Province, South Korea)
- Died: 28 October 2008 (aged 95) Pyongyang, North Korea
- Party: Workers' Party of Korea

Korean name
- Hangul: 박성철
- Hanja: 朴成哲
- RR: Bak Seongcheol
- MR: Pak Sŏngch'ŏl

Pak Song-chol or Park Sung-chul (Korean: 박성철; 2 September 1913 – 28 October 2008) was a North Korean politician who served as Premier of North Korea from 1976 to 1977. He succeeded Kim Il. He also served as foreign minister from 1959 to 1970.

== Biography ==
Pak Song-Chol was born in Keishū, Keishōhoku-dō (today North Gyeongsang Province) during the Japanese colonial period. He attended and dropped out of Sophia University in Japan. While studying abroad, he joined the Japanese Communist Party. Pak participated in Anti-Japan Partisan in Manchukuo in April 1934. In 1936, he was a youth member of the 1st corps of the 5th Army of the Tohoku Anti-Japanese Union. During this period, he was described as an extremely loyal and courageous youth member. In 1937, the second army 4th teacher 1st group. 1942, 1st platoon, 1st battalion, 1st battalion, 88th independent sniper brigade where he met Kim Il Sung. He's the father of Pak Chun Bo, who had learned together with Kim Il Sung's son Kim Jong Il.

In the spring of 1942, as a Soviet military reconnaissance officer, he was given the task of following the deployment situation of Japanese troops at the border. It should be a mission that ends in a week, but he did not return until autumn, during which he sent important information over radio signals.

=== North Korea ===
In 1948 he was the Chief of Staff of the 3rd Division of the Korean People's Army (Colonel) . In 1950, he became the 15th division Commander and participated in the Korean War. In September 1953 he was appointed Director of the Ministry of National Guard and Scouting. After that, he moved to the Ministry of Foreign Affairs, and from August 1954, he served as an envoy to the People's Republic of Bulgaria, and in May 1955 the ambassador. August 1956, International Director of the Central Committee of the Workers' Party of Korea, Deputy Foreign Minister since October of the same year, and Foreign Minister in October 1959, until he retired in July 1970. During this time, in 1966 he also served as the Vice Premier in the Cabinet of North Korea.

In 1972, as vice premier, he secretly visited Seoul in the lead-up to the July 4th North–South Korea Joint Statement on reunification.

He was appointed Vice President by the Supreme People's Assembly in December 1977 and he left the office in October 1997. His last public appearance was in September 2003 in the viewing box at the 55th-anniversary commemoration inspection ceremonies in North Korea. He was one of the oldest former heads of government in the world.

=== Death and funeral ===
Pak died on 28 October 2008. A funeral committee was appointed with Kim Yong-nam as the chairman.

== Works ==
- Pak Sung-chul (1970). "Speech by Comrade Pak Sung Chul [Speeches at the Peking Rally Commemorating the Twentieth Anniversary of the Fatherland Liberation War of Korea and Condemning U.S. Imperialism for Forcibly Occupying China's Taiwan (June 25, 1970)]". People of Asia: Unite and Drive the U.S. Agressors Out of Asia!. Peking: Foreign Languages Press. OCLC 204899.
- — (1977). "As He Leads The Revolution". As He Leads the Revolution, for the Freedom and Liberation of the People. Pyongyang: Foreign Languages Publishing House. OCLC 6198041.
- — (1977). "Congratulory Speech". The International Seminar on the Juche Idea: September, 1977, Pyongyang. Pyongyang: Foreign Languages Publishing House. pp. 13–26. OCLC 70308637.
- — (September 1988). "The Republic Is a Great Revolutionary Achievement Obtained Through the Long and Arduous Struggle Under the Leadership of the Respected and Beloved Comrade Kim Il-song" (PDF). Kulloja (9). OCLC 9516938. Archived from the original (PDF) on 5 October 2022.
- Kim Il; Choe Hyon; Pak Sung-chul; et al. (1982). Twenty-year-long Anti-Japanese Revolution Under the Red Sunrays: September 1931 – February 1936. Vol. 2. Pyongyang: Foreign Languages Publishing House. OCLC 914716941.

== See also ==
- Politics of North Korea
