= Cabinet of North Korea =

Administrative and executive body of North Korea

Cabinet of the Democratic People's Republic of Korea

Government overview
- Formed: 1948
- Jurisdiction: North Korea
- Headquarters: Pyongyang
- Government executives: Pak Thae-song, Premier; Yang Sung Ho, Pak Jong-gun, Kim Song Ryong, Ri Song Hak, Pak Hun, Ju Chol-gyu, Jon Sung Guk, Vice Premiers
- Website: Minju Choson, the official newspaper of the Cabinet

The Cabinet of the Democratic People's Republic of Korea (Korean: 조선민주주의인민공화국 내각; Hanja: 朝鮮民主主義人民共和國 內閣) is the supreme administrative organ of North Korea and the executive organ of the Supreme People's Assembly, the highest organ of state power. The Cabinet's official newspaper is Minju Choson.

== History ==
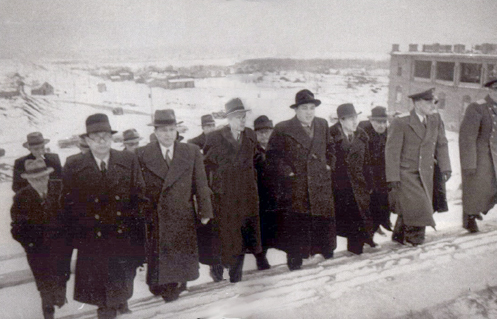
The cabinet, headed by Kim Il Sung, visiting Moscow in 1950

In North Korea's first constitution, adopted in 1948, the executive powers were vested in the Cabinet, chaired by Kim Il Sung himself.

The 1972 constitution saw the establishment of the post of President of North Korea which led the executive branch, and the cabinet was split into two organizations: The Central People's Committee (Korean: 중앙인민위원회) and the State Administration Council (Korean: 정무원). The Central People's Committee provided the highest visible institutional link between the party and the government and served in effect as a de facto super-cabinet. According to the 1972 constitution, the Central People's Committee, chaired by President of North Korea, exercised wide range of powers such as shaping the internal and external policies of the state, direct the work of the Administration Council and provincial people's committee, supervising the execution of the constitution, laws and ordinances of the Supreme People's Assembly, establish or abolish ministries, executive bodies of the Administration Council and appoint or remove vice premiers, ministers and other members of the Administration Council and also to declare a state of war and enacting mobilization orders in case of emergency. Article 104 gave the authority to the CPC to adopt decrees and decisions and issue directives. The National Defence Commission was then one of the sub-committees of this body.

The State Administration Council was guided by the CPC and was led by a premier (chong-ri) and included vice premiers (bochong-ri), ministers (boojang), committee chairmen, and other cabinet-level members of central agencies. It was responsible for the formulation of state economic development plans and measures for implementing them, the preparation of the state budget, and the handling of other monetary and fiscal matters.

1982 saw the People's Armed Forces and Public Security Ministries assigned directly to the President together with the State Inspection Commission.

In 1990, by a CPC decision, the National Defence Commission became fully independent from it as a separate institution, and 1992 constitutional amendments assigned it directly to the Supreme People's Assembly. In 1998 amendments to the Constitution, the Central People's Committee and the State Administration were abolished, and the Cabinet was re-created. Thus, the Cabinet is not only the highest administrative and executive organ but was also expanded to become the general State management organ.

Emphasizing its expanded role, in January 1999 Kim Jong Il stated that

"The party organizations and party cadres should not intervene in administrative matters. The party should help the cabinet to be responsible for all economic affairs. Last year we made a new governmental system where the cabinet is supposed to be the control tower of the economy...No organizational unit should handle economic problems without consulting the cabinet".

== Selection ==
The cabinet is appointed and accountable to the Supreme People's Assembly, the North Korean unicameral parliament. The SPA chooses the Premier of North Korea (Leader of the Cabinet) who appoints three vice premiers and the cabinet's ministers. All members of the cabinet are members of the Workers' Party of Korea which rules the country since its establishment in 1948. While the SPA is not in session, the cabinet is accountable to the Presidium of the Supreme People's Assembly.

As of 2000, some 260 people have served as cabinet ministers. Six of them have been women: Ho Jong-suk (Minister of Culture, Justice), Pak Chong-ae (Agriculture), Yi Yang-suk (Commerce, Textile and Paper Industries), Pak Yong-sin (Culture), Yi Ho-hyok (Foodstuff and Daily Necessities Industries), and Yun Gi-jong (Finance).

== Powers and responsibilities ==
The Cabinet, as the executive branch of the North Korean state, is responsible for implementing the state's economic policies, as guided by the Workers' Party. The cabinet is not responsible for defense and security issues, as those are handled by the State Affairs Commission. Thus, the security organizations such as the Korean People's Army, Ministry of Social Security and State Security Department report and subordinated directly to the SAC, whose chairman holds full power as the supreme leader of the republic and the party and overall commander-in-chief of all uniformed forces. The Cabinet convenes a plenary meeting and an executive meeting. The plenary meeting consists of all the Cabinet members, while the executive meeting is kind of a presidium, and comprises fewer people, including the Premier, vice premier and other Cabinet members whom the Premier nominates. The cabinet acts in the form of decisions and directives. In the performance of its mandate the Cabinet is empowered by the Constitution to:

1. adopt measures to execute state policy.
2. institute, amend, and supplement regulations concerning state management based on the Constitution and ministerial laws.
3. guide the work of the Cabinet commissions, ministries, direct ministries and subordinate agencies of the Cabinet and the local people's committees
4. set up and remove direct ministries and agencies, main administrative economic organizations, and enterprises, and adopt measures to improve the State management structure.
5. draft the State plan for the development of the national economy and adopt measures to put it into effect.
6. compile the State budget and adopt measures to implement it.
7. organize and exercise works in the fields of industry, agriculture, construction, transportation, communications, commerce, trade, land management, city management, education, science, culture, health, physical training, labor administration, environmental protection, tourism and others.
8. adopt measures to strengthen the monetary and banking system.
9. do inspection and control work to establish a state management order.
10. adopt measures to maintain social order, protect State and social cooperation body's possession and interests, and to guarantee citizens’ rights.
11. conclude treaties with foreign countries, and conduct external activities.
12. abolish decisions and directions by economic administrative organs, which run counter to the decisions or directions made by its members.

Those Cabinet ministries that oversee economic sectors also control groups of industries called "complexes". These complexes consist of partially or fully state-owned industrial facilities like factories, mines, or farms, depending on the sector. At a local level, the Cabinet supervises the Local People's Committees.

== Structure ==
As of 22 March 2026, the Cabinet consists of the following members:

Position	Minister	Political party	Took office	Ref
Premier	Pak Thae-song	Workers' Party	29 December 2024	
First Vice Premier	Kim Tok-hun	Workers' Party	22 March 2026	
Vice Premier and Chairman of the State Planning Commission	Pak Jong-gun	Workers' Party	17 January 2021	
Vice Premier	Jon Hyon-chol	Workers' Party	22 March 2026	
Vice Premier	Pak Hun	Workers' Party	22 March 2026	
Vice Premier	Ri Kyong-il	Workers' Party	22 March 2026	
Vice Premier	Kim Chang-sok	Workers' Party	22 March 2026	
Vice Premier	Jon Sung-guk	Workers' Party	8 June 2022	
Vice Premier and Chairman of the Agricultural Commission	Ri Chol-man	Workers' Party	30 December 2023	
Minister of Foreign Affairs	Choe Son-hui	Workers' Party	8 June 2022	
Minister of Public Security	Pang Tu-sop	Workers' Party	30 July 2024	
Secretary General of the Cabinet	Kim Kum-chol	Workers' Party	17 January 2021	
Minister of Metallurgical Industry	Kim Kwang-nam	Workers' Party	22 March 2026	
Minister of Chemical Industry	Kim Son-myong	Workers' Party	January 2026	
Minister of Electric Power Industry	Kim Yu-il	Workers' Party	17 January 2021	
Minister of Coal Industry	Ri Yong-chol	Workers' Party	22 March 2026	
Minister of Railways	Kim Ha-gyu	Workers' Party	22 March 2026	
Minister of Land and Maritime Transport	Jo Jong-ryong	Workers' Party	22 March 2026	
Minister of Mining Industry	Ri Sang-do	Workers' Party	30 December 2023	
Minister of Natural Resources Development	Kwon Song-hwan	Workers' Party	29 December 2024	
Minister of Forestry	Han Yong-ho	Workers' Party	22 March 2026	
Minister of Machine-Building Industry	Ri Kwang-nam	Workers' Party	22 March 2026	
Minister of Nuclear Power Industry	Wang Chang-uk	Workers' Party	11 April 2019	
Minister of Shipbuilding at the Second Economy Commission	Kim Kwang-il	Workers' Party	22 March 2026	
Minister of IT Industry	Ju Yong-il	Workers' Party	17 January 2021	
Minister of Construction and Building-Materials Industry	So Jong-jin	Workers' Party	17 January 2021	
Minister of State Construction Control	Yang Ki-song	Workers' Party	22 March 2026	
Minister of Light Industry	Ri Yong-gun	Workers' Party	22 March 2026	
Minister of Regional Industry	Kim Chol-bom	Workers' Party	22 March 2026	
Minister of Fisheries	Yun Song-chol	Workers' Party	22 March 2026	
Minister of Finance	Ri Myong-guk	Workers' Party	1 July 2024	
Minister of Labor	Jin Kum-song	Workers' Party	17 January 2021	
Minister of External Economic Relations	Yun Jong-ho	Workers' Party	17 January 2021	
Chairman of the State Commission of Science and Technology	Kim Song-bin	Workers' Party	8 October 2024	
President of the State Academy of Sciences	Kim Sung-jin	Workers' Party	29 December 2019	
Minister of Land and Environment Protection	Yang Yong-jin	Workers' Party	22 March 2026	
Minister of Urban Management	Kim Son-il	Workers' Party	22 March 2026	
Minister of Disaster Management	Kim Chol-nam	Workers' Party	22 March 2026	
Minister of Grain Administration	Kim Kwang-jin	Workers' Party	27 September 2023	
Minister of Commerce	Kim Yong-sik	Workers' Party	29 December 2024	
Minister of Education	Kim Chol-nam	Workers' Party	22 March 2026	
Minister of Public Health	Kim Tu-won	Workers' Party	22 March 2026	
Minister of Culture	Hyon Un-chol	Workers' Party	22 March 2026	
Minister of Physical Culture and Sports	Kim Il-guk	Workers' Party	December 2016	
President of the Central Bank	Paek Min-gwang	Workers' Party	27 September 2023	
Director of the Central Bureau of Statistics	Ri Chol-san	Workers' Party	17 January 2021	

== See also ==
- Politics of North Korea
- State Council of South Korea
