= Macklem =

Macklem is a surname. Notable people with the surname include:

- Peter Macklem (1931–2011), Canadian doctor, medical researcher, and hospital administrator
- Tiff Macklem (born 1961), Canadian banker and economist

== See also ==
- Mackler
