= Meckler =

Meckler or Mekler is a surname of German origin that may refer to:

- Alan Meckler (born 1945), American businessman
- David Meckler (born 1987), American ice hockey player
- Gabriel Mekler (1942–1977), American musician
- Grigory Mekler (1909–2005), Soviet military officer
- Jackie Mekler (1932–2019), South African long-distance runner
- Mark Meckler (born 1962), American political activist
- Nancy Meckler (born 1947), American theatre director
- Ruth Meckler (1937–2005), American pianist
- Wade Meckler (born 2000), American baseball outfielder for the San Francisco Giants

== See also ==
- Meckler-Allen 1912 Biplane
- Mackler
