= Kim Il Sung =

Leader of North Korea from 1948 to 1994

Eternal President Kim Il Sung
- Kim in 1950

General Secretary of the Workers' Party of Korea
- In office 12 October 1966 – 8 July 1994
- Secretary: See list: Choe Yong-gon; Kim Il; Pak Kum-chol; Ri Hyo-son; Kim Kwang-hyop; Sok San; Ho Pong-hak; Kim Yong-ju; Pak Yong-guk; Kim To-man; Ri Kuk-jin; Kim Jung-rin; Yang Hyong-sop; O Jin-u; Kim Tong-gyu; Han Ik-su; Hyon Mu-gwang; Kim Jong Il; Hwang Jang-yop; Kim Yong-nam; Kim Hwan; Yon Hyong-muk; Yun Ki-bok; Hong Si-hak
- Preceded by: Himself (as Chairman)
- Succeeded by: Kim Jong Il

President of North Korea
- In office 28 December 1972 – 8 July 1994
- Premier: See list: Kim Il; Pak Song-chol; Ri Jong-ok; Kang Song-san; Ri Kun-mo; Yon Hyong-muk; Kang Song-san
- Vice President: See list: Choe Yong-gon; Kang Ryang-uk; Kim Tong-kyu; Kim Il; Pak Song-chol; Rim Chun-chu; Ri Jong-ok; Kim Pyong-sik
- Preceded by: Office established (Note: Choi Yong-kun was previously head of state as the President of the Presidium of the Supreme People's Assembly.)
- Succeeded by: Office abolished (Note: Kim Yong-nam became later head of state as the President of the Presidium of the Supreme People's Assembly.) (Note: In 2021, the official English translation of Kim Jong Un's preferred title, Chairman, was changed to "President". However, the Korean word 위원장, meaning "Chairman", was not replaced.)
Other positions held
Chairman of the Central Military Commission
In office 14 December 1962 – 8 July 1994
Preceded by	Office established
Succeeded by	Kim Jong Il
Chairman of the Workers' Party of Korea
In office 24 June 1949 – 12 October 1966
Vice Chairman	See list: Ho Ka-i; Pak Hon-yong; Kim Il; Pak Chang-ok; Pak Chong-ae; Pak Kum-chol; Pak Yong-bin; Choe Yong-gon; Jong Il-yong; Kim Chang-man; Ri Hyo-son
Preceded by	Kim Tu-bong
Succeeded by	Himself (as General Secretary)
1st Premier of North Korea
In office 9 September 1948 – 8 July 1994
President	Kim Tu-bong; Choe Yong-gon
First Vice Premier	Kim Il
Vice Premier	See list: Pak Hon-yong; Hong Myong-hui; Kim Chaek; Kim Il; Jong Il-ryong; Nam Il; Pak Ui-wan; Jong Jun-thaek; Kim Kwang-hyop; Kim Chang-man; Ri Jong-ok; Ri Ju-yon; Pak Song-chol; Choe Yong-jin
Preceded by	Office established
Succeeded by	Kim Jong Il
Supreme Commander of the Korean People's Army
In office 5 July 1950 – 28 December 1972
Preceded by	Choe Yong-gon
Succeeded by	Office abolished (Note: The 1972 constitution designated President of North Korea as the Supreme Commander of the Korean People's Army.)

Personal details
- Born: Kim Song Ju; 15 April 1912 Heijō, Korea, Empire of Japan
- Died: 8 July 1994 (aged 82) Hyangsan, North Pyongan, North Korea
- Resting place: Kumsusan Palace of the Sun
- Party: Workers' Party of Korea (from 1949)
- Other political affiliations: Workers' Party of North Korea (1946–1949); Communist Party of North Korea (1946); Communist Party of Korea (NKBB) (1945–1946); Chinese Communist Party (1931–1945)
- Spouses: Kim Jong-suk (m. 1941; died 1949); Kim Song-ae (m. 1952)
- Children: 10, including: Kim Jong Il; Kim Man-il; Kim Kyong-hui; Kim Pyong Il
- Parents: Kim Hyong-jik; Kang Pan Sok
- Relatives: Kim family

Military service
- Allegiance: Communist China; Soviet Union; North Korea
- Branch/service: Northeast Counter-Japanese United Army; Red Army; Korean People's Army
- Years of service: 1936–1941; 1941–1945; 1948–1994
- Rank: Grand marshal (KPA); Captain (Red Army)
- Unit: 88th Separate Rifle Brigade, Red Army
- Commands: Supreme Commander
- Battles/wars: World War II; Korean War
- Kim's voice Kim speaking at a North–South Korean joint meeting Recorded 1948

Korean name
- Hangul: 김일성
- Hanja: 金日成
- RR: Gim Ilseong
- MR: Kim Ilsŏng

Birth name
- Hangul: 김성주
- Hanja: 金成柱
- RR: Gim Seongju
- MR: Kim Sŏngju
- Central institution membership: 1980–1994: Member, Presidium of the Political Bureau of the 6th Central Committee of the Workers' Party of Korea; 1970–1980: Member, Political Committee of the Central Committee of the Workers' Party of Korea; 1966–1994: Secretariat of the Workers' Party of Korea; 1966–1970: Member, Standing Committee of the Political Committee of the Central Committee of the Workers' Party of Korea; 1961–1970: Chairman, Political Committee of the Central Committee of the Workers' Party of Korea; 1956–1961: Member, Standing Committee of the Central Committee of the Workers' Party of Korea; 1948–1994: Deputy, 1st, 2nd, 3rd, 4th, 5th, 6th, 7th, 8th and 9th Supreme People's Assembly; 1946–1956: Member, Political Committee of the Central Committee of the Workers' Party of Korea; 1946–1994: Member, 1st, 2nd, 3rd, 4th, 5th, and 6th Central Committee of the Workers' Party of Korea; Other offices held: 1962–1994: Chairman, Central Military Commission of the Workers' Party of Korea; 1972–1992: Chairman, National Defense Commission of the Central People's Committee of the Democratic People's Republic of Korea; 1970–1982: Chairman, Military Commission of the Central Committee of the Workers' Party of Korea; 1992–1993: Chairman, National Defense Commission of the Democratic People's Republic of Korea; 1947–1948: Chairman, People's Committee of North Korea; 1946–1949: Vice Chairman, Central Committee of the Workers' Party of North Korea; 1946–1947: Chairman, Provisional People's Committee of North Korea; 1945–1946: Chairman, North Korea Bureau of the Communist Party of Korea; Supreme Leader of North Korea: ← (Inaugural holder); Kim Jong Il →

Kim Il Sung (Note: Kim Il Sung is the English-language transcription used by the North Korean government. Kim Il-sung is another common transcription in English. (/kɪm ɪlˈsʌŋ, -ˈsʊŋ/; Korean: 김일성, Korean pronunciation: [kimils͈ʌŋ]) (born Kim Song Ju; (Note: Kim Il Sung's birth name is properly romanized either as "Kim Song Ju" or "Kim Seong-ju", with the official English translation of his autobiography With the Century using the romanization 'Song Ju'. The romanization "Sung Ju" is considered incorrect, as the Korean ㅓ is not romanized as "u" in either McCune–Reischauer nor in Revised Romanization.) (Note: 김성주) 15 April 1912 – 8 July 1994) was a North Korean communist revolutionary, military officer, politician, and dictator who founded the Democratic People's Republic of Korea (DPRK), also known as North Korea, in 1948, and led it until his death in 1994. He was succeeded by his son Kim Jong Il and posthumously declared Eternal President. He was the third-longest-serving non-royal head of state and government in the 20th century, in office for more than 45 years.

Kim was born in Japanese-ruled Korea and grew up in northeast China. During his teenage years, he became a communist and joined various anti-Japanese guerrilla groups, eventually joining the Chinese Communist Party (CCP) in 1931. In 1942, he was assigned to the Soviet Red Army, leading him to stay in the Soviet Union until 1945. Following the division of Korea after Japan's surrender in World War II, he was installed in power over North Korea by the Soviet Union, which also had him appointed as the leader of the Workers' Party of Korea. In 1950, Kim Il Sung authorized the invasion of South Korea, triggering a U.S.-led intervention in defense of South Korea. Following the military stalemate in the Korean War, a ceasefire was signed in 1953.

Under Kim's leadership, North Korea was established as a totalitarian, socialist, personalist dictatorship with a centrally planned economy. It had close political and economic relations with the Soviet Union and China. By the 1960s, North Korea had a slightly higher standard of living than the South, which was suffering from political chaos and economic crises. This was reversed in the 1970s, as a newly stable South Korea became an economic powerhouse while North Korea's economy stagnated and then collapsed. Kim also broke off from orthodox Marxism–Leninism by developing the ideology of Juche, which focused on the principles of "independence, self-sustenance and self-defence" and Korean nationalism.

Despite the official policy of "self-reliance" (jaryok gaengsaeng, Korean: 자력갱생), North Korea received funds, subsidies and aid from the Soviet Union and the Eastern Bloc until the dissolution of the Soviet Union in 1991. The resulting loss of economic aid negatively affected North Korea's economy, contributing to widespread famine in 1994. During this period, North Korea also remained critical of the United States military's presence in the region, which it considered imperialist, having seized the American ship USS Pueblo in 1968. This was part of an infiltration and subversion campaign to reunify the peninsula under North Korea's rule. Kim outlived his allies, Joseph Stalin and Mao Zedong, by many years, and remained in power during the terms of office of six South Korean presidents and ten United States presidents. Known as the Great Leader (Suryong), he established a far-reaching personality cult which dominates domestic politics in North Korea. At the 6th WPK Congress in 1980, his oldest son, Kim Jong Il, was elected to be a Presidium member and chosen as his successor, establishing the Kim dynasty.

== Early life ==
=== Family background ===
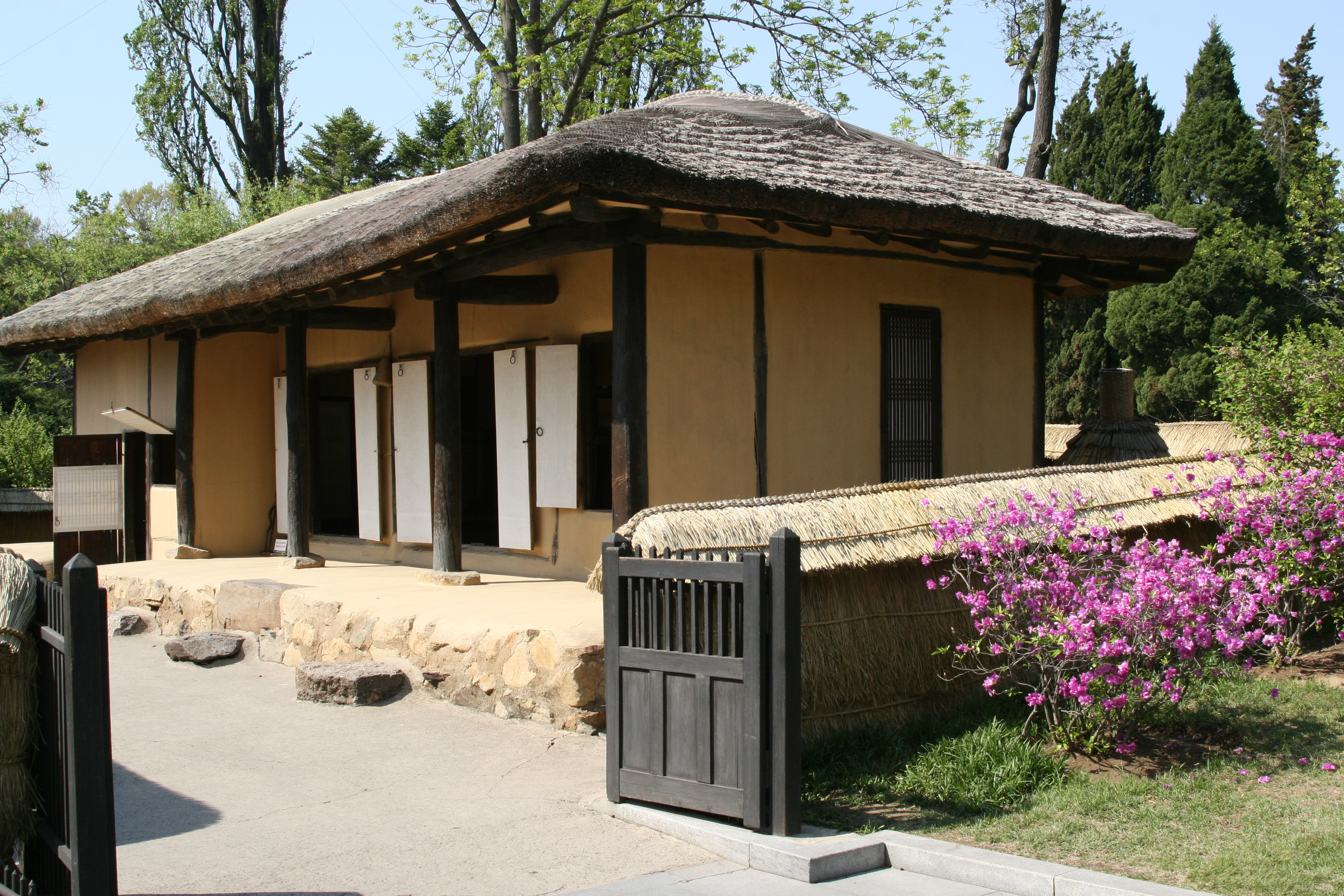
The house in which Kim was born

Kim Il Sung was born Kim Sung Ju (Note: Also romanized as Kim Seong-ju according to Revised Romanization of Korean or Kim Sŏngju according to McCune–Reischauer.) to independence activist Kim Hyong-jik and Kang Pan Sok. Kim had two younger brothers, Kim Ch'ŏlchu and Kim Yong-ju. Kim Hyong Jik also had an adopted son Kim Ryong-ho, born in 1911. Kim Chol Ju died while fighting the Japanese and Kim Yong-ju came to be involved in the North Korean government; he was considered as an heir to his brother before he fell out of favor.

Kim's family, part of the Jeonju Kim clan, is said to have originated in Jeonju, North Jeolla Province. In 1860, his great-grandfather, Kim Ŭngu, settled in the Mangyongdae neighborhood of Pyongyang. Kim was reportedly born in the small village of Mangyongdae-guyok (then called Namni) or Chilgol, near Pyongyang (then called Heijō) on 15 April 1912. According to a 1964 semi-official biography of Kim, he was born in his mother's home in Chingjong, and later grew up in Mangyongdae-guyok.

According to Kim, his family was always a step away from poverty. Kim said that he was raised by a very active Presbyterian Christian family. His maternal grandfather was a Protestant minister. His father had gone to a missionary school, and he was an elder in the Presbyterian Church.

In 1919, Kim Hyong-jik participated in the anti-Japanese March First Movement. Like most Korean families, Kim's family resented the Japanese occupation of Korea (which had begun on 29 August 1910). Japanese repression of Korean opposition was harsh, resulting in the arrest and detention of more than 52,000 Korean citizens in 1912 alone. This repression had forced many Korean families to flee the Korean Peninsula, and settle in Manchuria, China.

In May 1919, Kim Hyong-jik took Kim Sung Ju and the rest of the family to flee to China and settle in Badaogou. Nevertheless, Kim's parents, especially his mother, played a role in the anti-Japanese struggle that was sweeping the peninsula. Their exact involvement – whether their cause was missionary, nationalist, or both – is unclear.

=== Communist and guerrilla activities ===
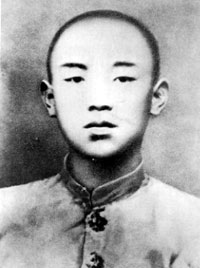
1926 portrait of Kim from Whasung Military Academy, published in his autobiography With the Century

North Korean government sources credit Kim with founding the Down-with-Imperialism Union in 1926, though most scholarly sources reject this. He attended Whasung Military Academy in 1926, but found the academy's training methods outdated and quit it in 1927. He then attended Yuwen Middle School in Jilin, China, until 1930, when he rejected the traditions of older-generation Koreans and became interested in communist ideology. Seventeen-year-old Kim became the youngest member of the Korean Communist Youth Association, an underground organization with fewer than twenty members. It was led by Hŏ So (허소; 許笑), who belonged to the South Manchurian Communist Youth Association. The police discovered the group three weeks after it formed in 1929, and jailed Kim for several months. Kim's formal education ended after his arrest and imprisonment.

He joined various anti-Japanese guerrilla groups in northern China, such as the Korean Revolutionary Army of the National People's Government, eventually becoming a member of the organisation committee for Fusong and Antu of the Korean Farmers' General Union in Eastern Provinces in 1930. In the same year, he became a member of the Military Political Council of the Army of the World Fire, which was established by former National People's Government member Lee Jong-nak, Feelings against the Japanese ran high in Manchuria, but as of May 1930 the Japanese had not yet occupied Manchuria. On 30 May 1930, a spontaneous violent uprising in eastern Manchuria arose in which peasants attacked some local villages in the name of resisting "Japanese aggression". The authorities easily suppressed this impromptu uprising. Because of the attack, the Japanese began to plan an occupation of Manchuria. In a speech Kim allegedly made before a meeting of Young Communist League delegates on 20 May 1931 in Yenchi County in Manchuria, he warned the delegates against such unplanned uprisings as the 30 May 1930 uprising in eastern Manchuria.

Four months later, on 18 September 1931, the Mukden incident occurred, in which a relatively weak dynamite explosive charge went off near a Japanese railroad in the town of Mukden in Manchuria. Although no damage occurred, the Japanese used the incident as an excuse to send armed forces into Manchuria and to appoint a puppet government. In 1931, Kim joined the Chinese Communist Party (CCP) – the Communist Party of Korea had been founded in 1925, but had been thrown out of the Communist International in the early 1930s for being too nationalist. From February 1932, he worked as a propagandaist in the Chinese People's National Salvation Army after being recruited by Wang Delin. However, after the Nationalist government ordered a purge of communists, Wang expelled the entire unit of propagandaists where Kim served. Afterwards, Kim joined the CCP-created Antu partisan unit. This unit was later merged with other units to create the Wangqing Anti-Japanese Partisan Unit, with Kim becoming its commissioner.

Kim was appointed in 1935 to serve as political commissar for the 3rd detachment of the second division, consisting of around 160 soldiers. Here Kim met the man who would become his mentor as a communist, Wei Zhengmin, Kim's immediate superior officer, who at the time was chairman of the Political Committee of the Northeast Anti-Japanese United Army. Wei reported directly to Kang Sheng, a high-ranking party member close to CCP chairman Mao Zedong in Yan'an, until Wei's death on 8 March 1941. In 1935, Kim took the name Kim Il Sung, meaning "Kim become the sun". In February 1936, Kim became a member of the Northeast Counter-Japanese United Army, a guerrilla group established by the CCP.

Kim's actions during the Minsaengdan incident helped solidify his leadership. The CCP operating in Manchuria had become suspicious that any Korean in Manchuria could secretly be a member of the pro-Japanese Minsaengdan. A purge resulted: over 1,000 Koreans were expelled from the CCP, including Kim (who was arrested in late 1933 and exonerated in early 1934), and 500 were killed. Kim himself was forced to confess alleged membership multiple times despite never having been a member. Kim Il Sung's memoirs – and those of the guerrillas who fought alongside him – cite Kim's seizing and burning the suspect files of the Purge Committee as key to solidifying his leadership. After the destruction of the suspect files and the rehabilitation of suspects, those who had fled the purge rallied around Kim. As historian Suzy Kim summarizes, Kim Il Sung "emerged from the purge as a definitive leader, not only for the bold move but also for his compassion."

Kim was appointed commander of the 6th division in 1937, at the age of 24, controlling a few hundred men in a group that came to be known as "Kim Il Sung's division". On 4 June 1937, he led 200 guerrillas in a raid on Poch'onbo, destroying the local government offices and setting fire to a Japanese police station and post office. The success of the raid demonstrated Kim's talents as a military leader. Even more significant than the military success itself was the political coordination and organization between the guerrillas and the Korean Fatherland Restoration Association, an anti-Japanese united front group based in Manchuria. These accomplishments would grant Kim some measure of fame among Chinese guerrillas, and North Korean biographies would later exploit it as a great victory for Korea.

For their part, the Japanese regarded Kim as one of the most effective and popular Korean guerrilla leaders ever. He appeared on Japanese wanted lists as the "Tiger". The Japanese "Maeda Unit" was sent to hunt him in February 1940. Later in 1940, the Japanese kidnapped a woman named Kim Hye-sun, believed to have been Kim Il Sung's first wife. After using her as a hostage to try to convince the Korean guerrillas to surrender, she was killed. Kim was appointed commander of the 2nd operational region for the 1st Army, but by the end of 1940 he was the only 1st Army leader still alive. Pursued by Japanese troops, in 23 October 1940, Kim and a dozen of his fighters escaped by crossing the Amur River into the Soviet Union. Kim was sent to a camp at Vyatskoye near Khabarovsk, where the Soviets retrained the Korean communist guerrillas.

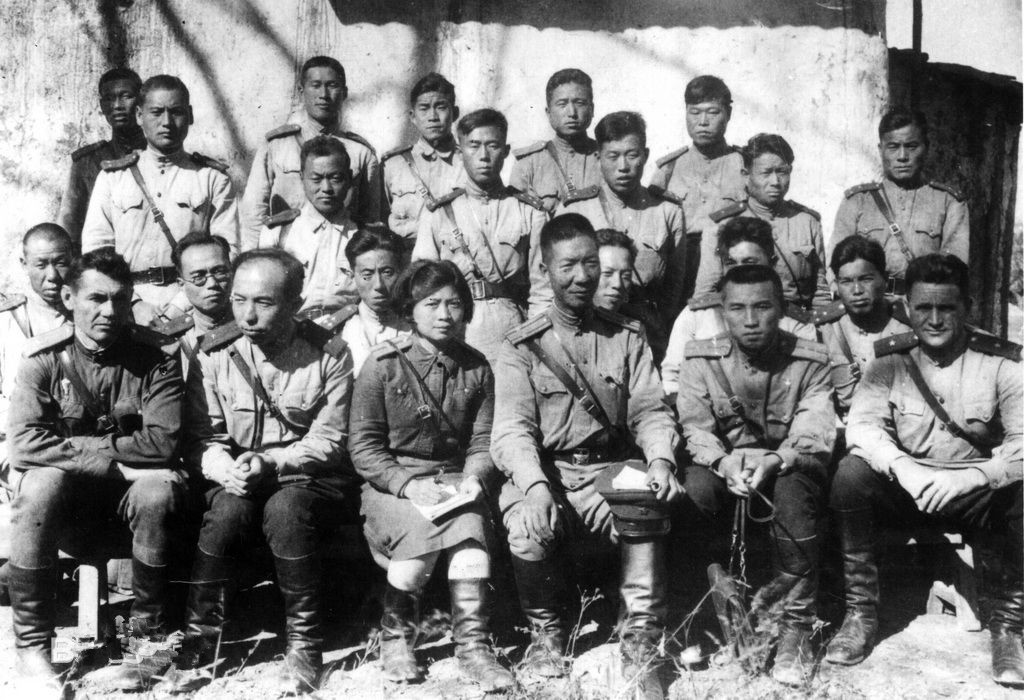
Members of the 88th Separate Rifle Brigade, an international military unit of the Red Army, in 1943. Kim is sitting in the front row, second from the right.

In August 1942, Kim and his army were assigned to a special unit known as the 88th Separate Rifle Brigade, which belonged to the Soviet Red Army. Kim's immediate superior was Zhou Baozhong. Kim became a Captain in the Soviet Red Army and served in it until the end of World War II in 1945.

=== Claims that Kim was an impostor ===
Several sources claim the name "Kim Il Sung" had previously been used by a prominent early leader of the Korean resistance, Kim Kyung-cheon. The Soviet officer Grigory Mekler, who worked with Kim during the Soviet occupation, said that Kim took this name from a former commander who had died. However, Russian historian Andrei Lankov has argued that this is unlikely to be true. Several witnesses knew Kim before and after his time in the Soviet Union, including his superior, Zhou Baozhong, who dismissed the claim of a "second" Kim in his diaries. US historian Bruce Cumings pointed out that Japanese officers from the Kwantung Army have attested to his fame as a resistance figure.

In 2019, investigative journalist Annie Jacobsen published the book Surprise, Kill, Vanish, which said that the U.S. Central Intelligence Agency (CIA) once concluded that Kim Il Sung was a blackmailed imposter operated by the Soviet Union. The dossier titled "The Identity of Kim Il Sung" said that the leader's true identity to Kim Song-ju, an orphaned child caught stealing money from a classmate who killed his classmate to avoid embarrassment. The dossier alleged Soviet intelligence officers blackmailed Kim Song-ju into leading the North Korean Communist Party as a Soviet puppet under the name of the real war hero Kim-Il Sung, whom Stalin had "disappeared". Jacobsen adds that the CIA said "specific instructions [were] given to the leaders of the regime that there should be no questions raised about Kim [Il Sung]'s identity."

Historians generally accept the view that, while Kim's exploits were exaggerated by the personality cult which was built around him, he was a significant guerrilla leader.

== Leadership (1948–1994) ==
=== Return to Korea ===
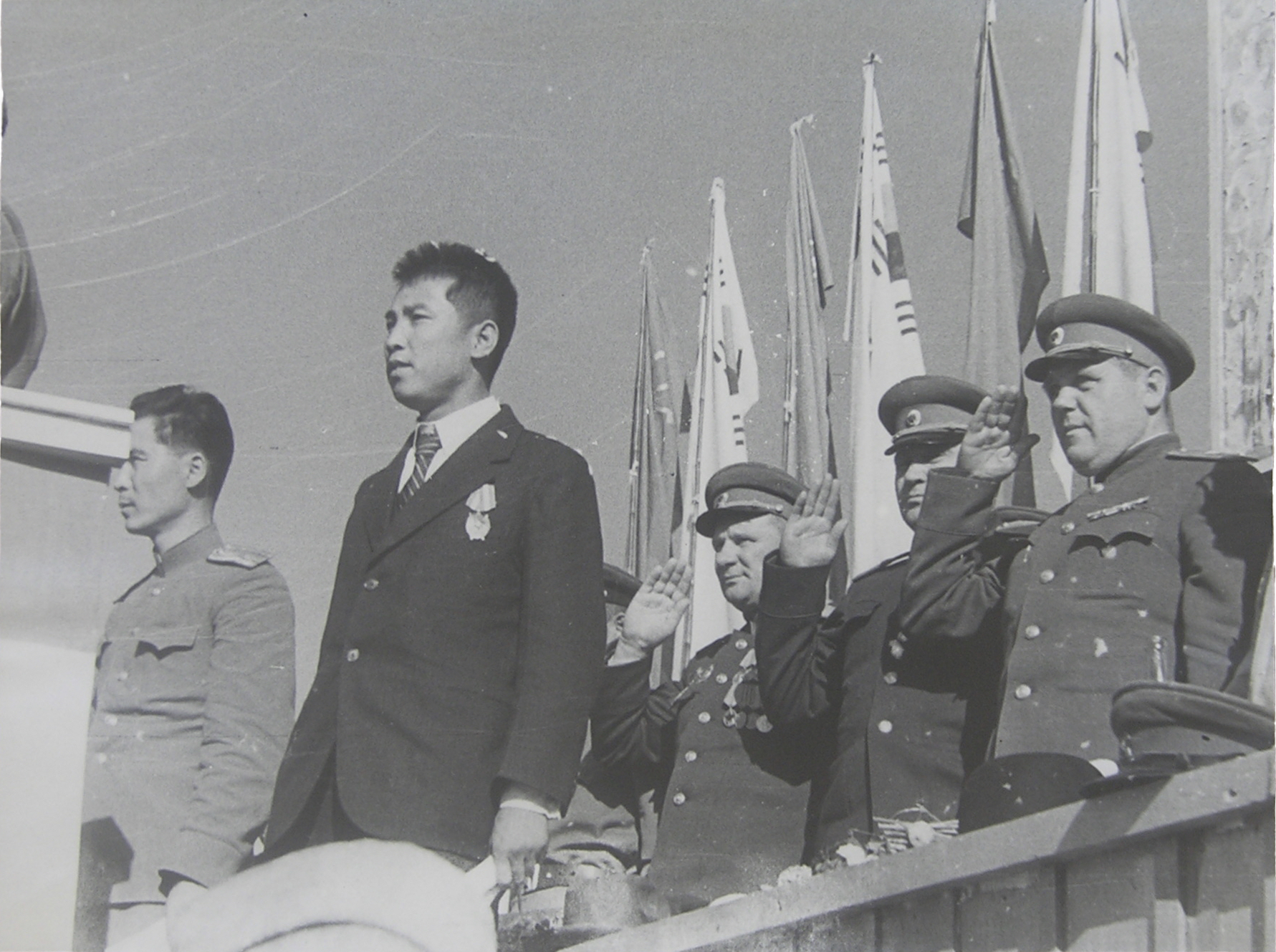
Kim (black suit) attending a mass event with members of the Soviet Civil Administration, Pyongyang, October 1945

The Soviet Union declared war on Japan on 8 August 1945, and the Red Army entered Pyongyang on 24 August 1945. Captain Kim Il Sung, a 33-year-old officer of the Red Army, arrived at the Korean port of Wonsan on 19 September 1945 after 26 years in exile. According to Leonid Vassin, an officer with the Soviet Ministry of Internal Affairs, Kim was essentially "created from zero." For one, his Korean was marginal at best; he had only eight years of formal education, all of it in Chinese. He needed considerable coaching to read a speech (which the MVD prepared for him) at a Communist Party congress three days after he arrived.

In August 1945, the Soviet Union instructed the intelligence section of the 25th Army to identify Koreans qualified to lead North Korea, which led them to create a list that did not include Kim, though none in the list were seen as qualified enough. During this time, he met with Soviet General Grigoriy Mekler, who visited the 88th Separate Rifle Brigade; impressed by Kim, Mekler wrote a positive assessment report on him, leading Soviet general Maksim Purkayev and Iosif Shikin, political officer of the Soviet Armed Forces in the Far East, to summon him to assess whether he could become the deputy commandant of Pyongyang. In later October 1945, deputy premier Georgiy Malenkov, deputy commissar of defense Nikolai Bulganin and Iosif Shikin recommended Kim Il Sung for leadership. During this time Lavrentiy Beria learned of Kim's existence and met Kim several times before recommending him to Stalin.

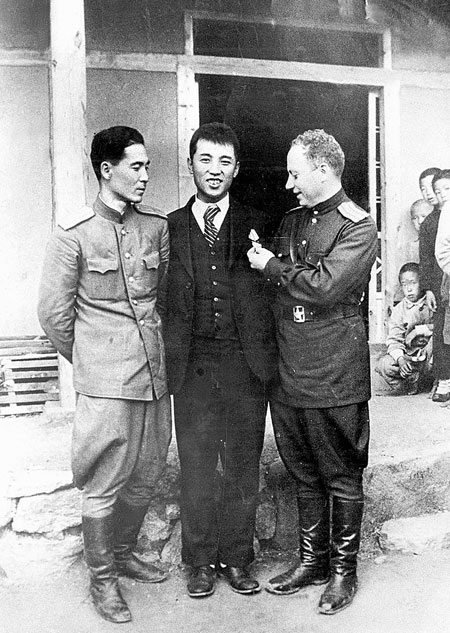
Kim Il Sung (center) receiving a medal from Soviet officers in Pyongyang, October 1945

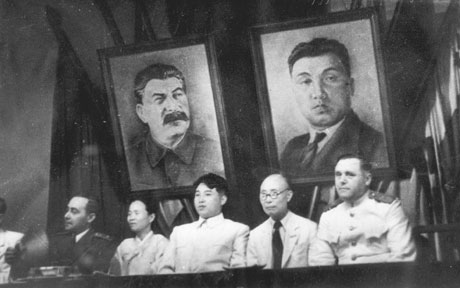
Kim Il Sung (center) and Kim Tu-bong (second from the right) at the joint meeting of the New People's Party and the Workers' Party of North Korea in Pyongyang, 28 August 1946

Stalin's final decision was passed to Politburo member Andrei Zhdanov, then to General Terentii Shtykov and then to the 25th Army. In December 1945, the Soviets installed Kim as first secretary of the North Korean Branch Bureau of the Communist Party of Korea. Originally, the Soviets preferred Cho Man-sik to lead a popular front government, but Cho refused to support a Soviet-backed trusteeship and clashed with Kim. General Terentii Shtykov, who led the Soviet occupation of northern Korea, supported Kim over Pak Hon-yong to lead the Provisional People's Committee for North Korea on 8 February 1946. As chairman of the committee, Kim was "the top Korean administrative leader in the North," though he was still de facto subordinate to General Shtykov until the Chinese intervention in the Korean War.

On 1 March 1946, while giving a speech to commemorate an anniversary of the March First Movement, a member of the anti-communist terrorist group the White Shirts Society attempted to assassinate Kim by lobbing a grenade at his podium. However, Soviet military officer Yakov Novichenko grabbed the grenade and absorbed the blast with his body, leaving Kim and other bystanders unharmed.

To solidify his control, Kim established the Korean People's Army (KPA), aligned with the Communist Party, and he recruited a cadre of guerrillas and former soldiers who had gained combat experience in battles against the Japanese and later against Nationalist Chinese troops. Using Soviet advisers and equipment, Kim constructed a large army skilled in infiltration tactics and guerrilla warfare. Prior to Kim's invasion of the South in 1950, which triggered the Korean War, Stalin equipped the KPA with modern, Soviet-built medium tanks, trucks, artillery, and small arms. Kim also formed an air force, equipped at first with Soviet-built, propeller-driven fighters and attack aircraft. Later, North Korean pilot candidates were sent to the Soviet Union and China to train in MiG-15 jet aircraft at secret bases.

=== Establishment of North Korea ===
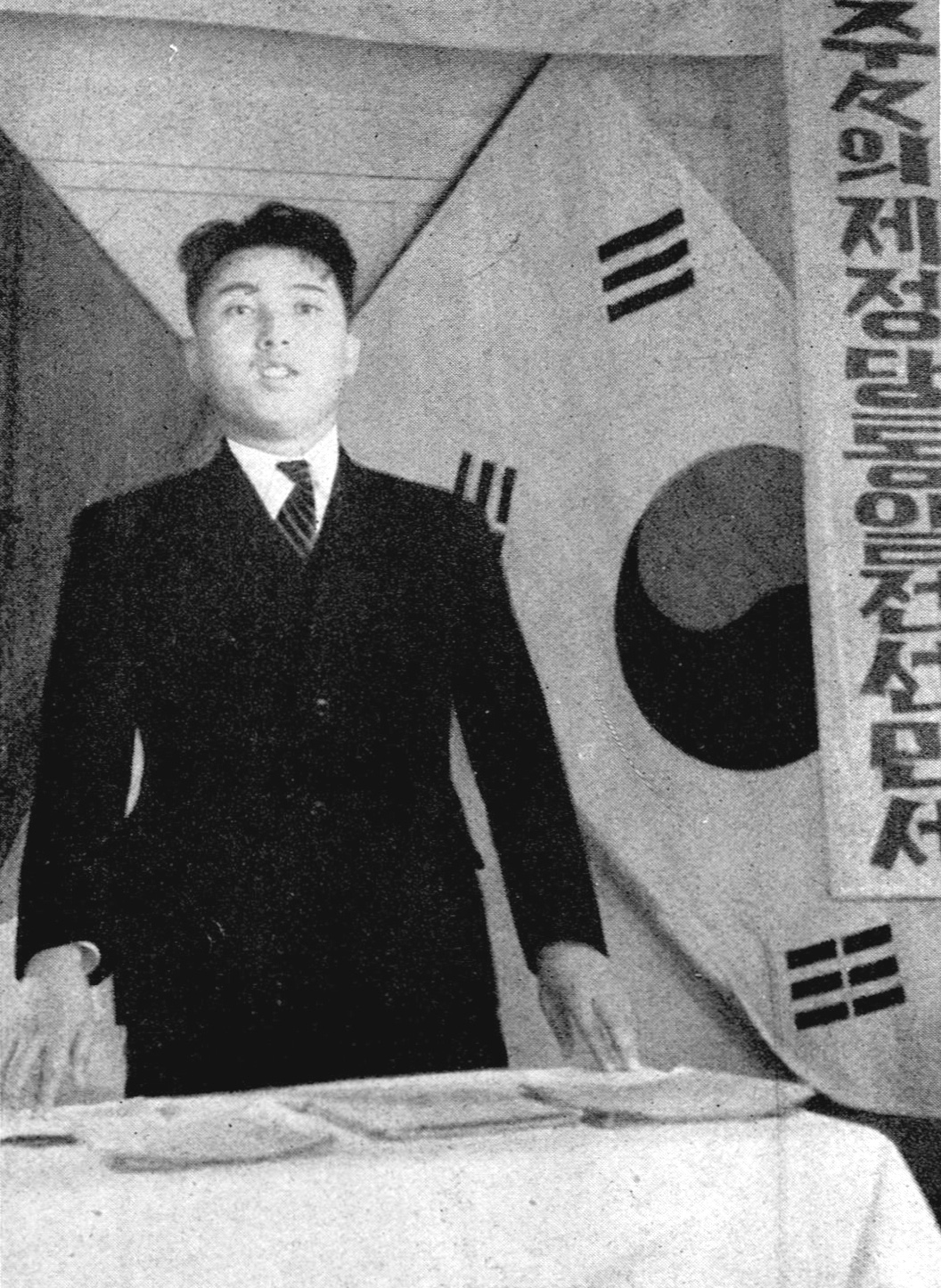
Kim during the 1946 North Korean local elections campaign

After North Korea rejected the United Nations' plans to conduct nationwide elections in Korea, on 15 August 1948, the Republic of Korea, which claimed sovereignty over all of Korea, was established. In response, the Soviets held elections of their own in their northern occupation zone on 25 August 1948 for a Supreme People's Assembly. The Democratic People's Republic of Korea was proclaimed on 10 July 1948, and Kim was designated by the Soviet Union as the premier on 9 September.

On 12 October, the Soviet Union recognized Kim's government as the sovereign government of the entire peninsula, including the south. The Communist Party merged with the New People's Party of Korea to form the Workers' Party of North Korea, with Kim as vice chairman. In June 1949, the Workers' Party of North Korea merged with its southern counterpart to become the Workers' Party of Korea (WPK) with Kim as party chairman. By 1949, Kim and the communists had consolidated their rule in North Korea. Around this time, Kim began promoting an intense personality cult. The first of many statues of him appeared, and he began calling himself "Great Leader".

In February 1946, Kim Il Sung decided to introduce a number of reforms. Over 50% of the arable land was redistributed, an 8-hour work day was proclaimed and all heavy industry was to be nationalized. There were improvements in the health of the population after he nationalized healthcare and made it available to all citizens.

=== Korean War ===
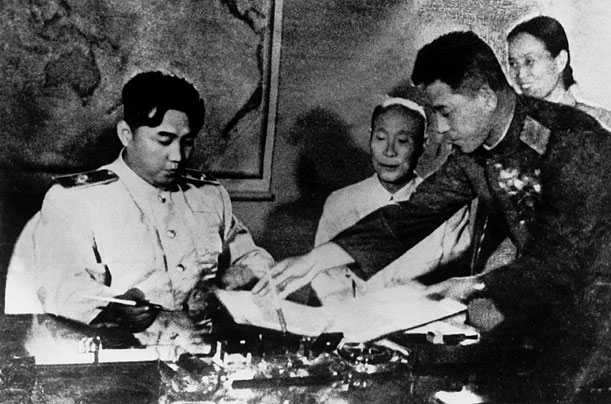
Kim signs the Korean Armistice Agreement.

Archival material suggests that North Korea's decision to invade South Korea was Kim's initiative, not a Soviet one. Evidence suggests that Soviet intelligence, through its espionage sources in the US government and British Secret Intelligence Service (SIS), had obtained information on the limitations of US atomic bomb stockpiles as well as defense program cuts, leading Stalin to conclude that President Harry S. Truman's administration would not intervene in Korea.

China acquiesced only reluctantly to the idea of Korean reunification after being told by Kim that Stalin had approved the action. The Chinese did not provide North Korea with direct military support (other than logistics channels) until United Nations troops, largely US forces, had nearly reached the Yalu River late in 1950. At the outset of the war in June and July, North Korean forces captured Seoul and occupied most of the South, save for a small section of territory in the southeast region of the South that was called the Pusan Perimeter. But in September, the North Koreans were driven back by the US-led counterattack that started with the UN landing in Incheon, followed by a combined South Korean-US-UN offensive from the Pusan Perimeter. By October, UN forces had retaken Seoul and invaded the North to reunify the country under the South. On 19 October, US and South Korean troops captured Pyongyang, forcing Kim and his government to flee north, first to Sinuiju and eventually into Kanggye.

On 25 October 1950, after sending various warnings of their intent to intervene if UN forces did not halt their advance, Chinese troops in the thousands crossed the Yalu River and entered the war as allies of the KPA. There were nevertheless tensions between Kim and the Chinese government. Kim had been warned of the likelihood of an amphibious landing at Incheon, which was ignored. There was also a sense that the North Koreans had paid little in war compared to the Chinese who had fought for their country for decades against foes with better technology. The UN troops were forced to withdraw and Chinese troops retook Pyongyang in December and Seoul in January 1951. In March, UN forces began a new offensive, retaking Seoul and advanced north once again halting at a point just north of the 38th Parallel. After a series of offensives and counter-offensives by both sides, followed by a grueling period of largely static trench warfare that lasted from the summer of 1951 to July 1953, the front was stabilized along what eventually became the permanent Military Demarcation Line of 27 July 1953. Over 2.5 million people died during the Korean War.

Chinese and Russian documents from that time reveal that Kim became increasingly desperate to establish a truce, since the likelihood that further fighting would successfully unify Korea under his rule became more remote with the UN and US presence. Kim also resented the Chinese taking over the majority of the fighting in his country, with Chinese forces stationed at the center of the front line, and the Korean People's Army being mostly restricted to the coastal flanks of the front.

=== Post-war consolidation of power ===
With the end of the Korean War, despite the failure to unify Korea under his rule, Kim Il Sung proclaimed a victory in the "Fatherland Liberation War" in the sense that he remained in power in the north. However, the three-year war left North Korea devastated, and Kim immediately embarked on a large reconstruction effort for the country. He launched a five-year national economic plan akin to Soviet Union's five-year plans to establish a command economy, with all industry owned by the state and all agriculture collectivized. The economy was focused on heavy industry and arms production. By the 1960s, North Korea enjoyed a standard of living which was higher than the standard of living in the South, which was fraught with political instability and economic crises.

In the ensuing years, Kim established himself as an independent leader of international communism. In 1956, he joined Mao in the "anti-revisionist" camp, which did not accept Nikita Khrushchev's program of de-Stalinization. At the same time, he consolidated his power over the WPK. Rival leaders were eliminated. Pak Hon-yong, former leader of the Korean Communist Party, was purged and executed in 1955. Ch'oe Ch'angik appears to have been purged as well. Yi Sang-Cho, North Korea's ambassador to the Soviet Union and a critic of Kim who defected to the Soviet Union in 1956, was declared a factionalist and a traitor. The 1955 speech titled On Eliminating Dogmatism and Formalism and Establishing Juche in Ideological Work, which stressed Korean independence from Soviet influence, debuted in the context of Kim's power struggle against leaders such as Pak, who had Soviet backing. This was little noticed at the time until state media started talking about it in 1963. Under Kim Il Sung, the Juche ideology was developed in opposition to the idea of North Korea as a satellite state of China or the Soviet Union.

Kim transformed North Korea into what Wonjun Song and Joseph Wright consider a personalist dictatorship, where power was centralized in Kim personally. Kim Il Sung's cult of personality had initially been criticized by some members of the government. The North Korean ambassador to the Sovet Union, Lee Sang-jo, a member of the Yan'an faction, reported that it had become a criminal offense to so much as write on Kim's picture in a newspaper and that he had been elevated to the status of Marx, Lenin, Mao, and Stalin in the communist pantheon. He also charged Kim with rewriting history so it would appear as if his guerrilla faction had single-handedly liberated Korea from the Japanese, completely ignoring the assistance of the Chinese People's Volunteers. In addition, Li stated that in the process of agricultural collectivization, grain was being forcibly confiscated from the peasants, leading to "at least 300 suicides" and he also stated that Kim made nearly all major policy decisions and appointments himself. Li reported that over 30,000 people were in prison for completely unjust and arbitrary reasons which were as trivial as not printing Kim Il Sung's portrait on sufficient quality paper or using newspapers with his picture to wrap parcels. Grain confiscation and tax collection were also conducted with force, which consisted of violence, beatings, and threats of imprisonment.

During the 1956 August faction incident, Kim Il Sung successfully resisted Soviet and Chinese efforts to depose him in favor of pro-Soviet Koreans or Koreans who belonged to the pro-Chinese Yan'an faction. In 1956, North Korea rejected Nikita Khrushchev's program of de-Stalinization. Khrushchev promoted the concept of collective leadership, and the Soviet embassy in North Korea started advising Kim Il Sung to either give up his position as WPK leader or as premier. Kim wanted to retain both positions, but was prepared to yield one of the positions to a close ally; he recommended Choe Yong-gon to the Soviet embassy. However, by 1957, Kim started to advise the Soviet embassy against appointing Choe. Kim also proposed Kim Il, who had little political independence. Over the following months, Kim Il Sung and his allies Nam Il and Pak Chong-ae started investigating the degree of the demands by the Soviet embassy. Soviet ambassador Alexander Puzanov did not push hard on the issue of division of powers, including in a personal meeting with Kim. This eventually led Kim to directly ignore Soviet advice and stay on as premier. The Soviet Union did not intervene, highlighting declining Soviet influence in North Korea. The last Chinese troops withdrew from the country in October 1958, which is the consensus as the latest date when North Korea became effectively independent, though some scholars believe that the 1956 August faction incident demonstrated North Korea's independence.

=== Strengthening control over society ===
On 30 May 1957, Kim published On Making the Struggle with the Counterrevolutionary Elements into the Movement of All the Party and of All the People, which created the songbun, a caste system in which the North Korean people were divided into three groups. Each person was classified as belonging to the "core", "wavering", or "hostile" class, based on his or her political, social, and economic background—this caste system persists today. Songbun was used to decide all aspects of a person's existence in North Korean society, including access to education, housing, employment, food rationing, ability to join the ruling party, and even where a person was allowed to live. Large numbers of people from the so-called hostile class, which included intellectuals, land owners, and former supporters of Japan's occupying government during World War II, were forcibly relocated to the country's isolated and impoverished northern provinces. When years of famine ravaged the country in the 1990s, those people who lived in its marginalized and remote communities were hardest hit.

The 4th Congress of the WPK in September 1961 saw Kim loyalists take over all key political positions. Having consolidated power, Kim started to intensify efforts to create a planned economy. He reorganized the public distribution system, which distributed goods provided by the state in quotas and was established in 1946, to become the only mechanism through which North Koreans could receive any goods. In 1960, he implemented the Chongsanri method, which led to agriculture being directly controlled by local party cadres, with any pre-alteration of economic plans requiring pre-approval by a superior party organisation. In 1961, he implemented the Taean work system, which replicated the same system across industry.

Despite his opposition to de-Stalinization, Kim never officially severed relations with the Soviet Union, and he did not take part in the Sino-Soviet split. North Korea signed a defense treaty with both the Soviet Union and China in 1961. After Khrushchev was replaced by Leonid Brezhnev in 1964, Kim's relations with the Soviet Union became closer. At the same time, Kim was increasingly alienated by Mao's unstable style of leadership, especially during the Cultural Revolution in the late 1960s. Kim in turn was denounced by Mao's Red Guards. At the same time, Kim reinstated relations with most of Eastern Europe's communist countries, primarily with Erich Honecker's East Germany and Nicolae Ceaușescu's Romania. Ceaușescu was heavily influenced by Kim's ideology, and the personality cult which grew around him in Romania was very similar to that of Kim.

=== Introduction of the Monolithic Ideological System ===
In October 1966, Kim convened the 2nd Conference of the WPK, when his position was renamed from Party Central Committee chairman to Central Committee General Secretary. The meeting also marked the beginning of the promotion of Juche as the state ideology. In 1967, a group of veterans of the anti-Japanese struggle of the 1930s and 1940s struggled Kim for leadership in what was known as the Kapsan faction incident. The incident led to the introduction of the Monolithic Ideological System at the fifteenth plenum of the 4th Central Committee in May 1967 to ensure Kim's absolute leadership over North Korea. On 25 May, Kim gave a speech titled On the Immediate Tasks in the Directions of the Party's Propaganda Work, which led to dramatic increase in state control over society. The cult of personality around Kim intensified dramatically, It became compulsory to write Kim's name in bold or a bigger font, his birthday became the Day of the Sun, and his portraits were mass produced around the country. Control over domestic travel increased, with 1967 seeing the introduction of local government-issued travel certificates that have since been required for North Korean citizens to leave their county of residence. Censorship was tightened significantly; even the Soviet Union's Pravda and China's People's Daily became banned, while the works of Karl Marx, Friedrich Engels, Vladimir Lenin, Joseph Stalin and Mao Zedong were removed from libraries.

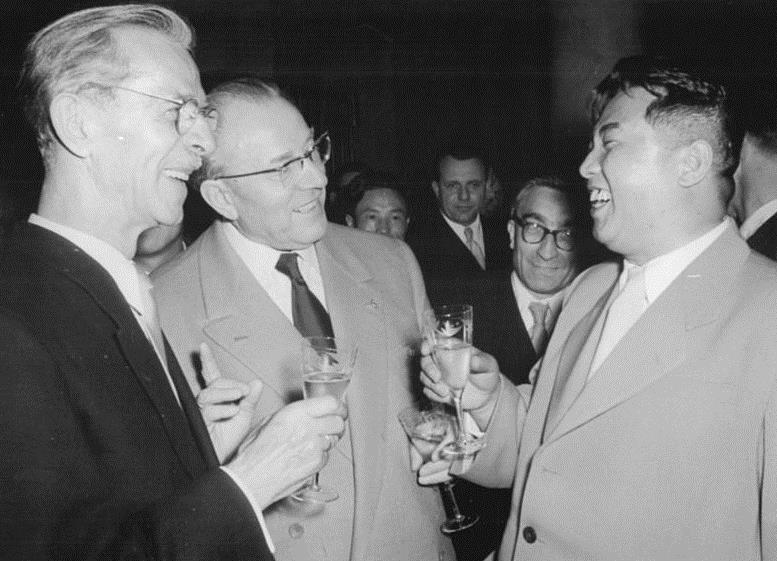
Kim on a 1956 visit to East Germany, chatting with painter Otto Nagel and Prime Minister Otto Grotewohl

In the 1960s, Kim became impressed with the efforts of North Vietnamese leader Ho Chi Minh to reunify Vietnam through guerrilla warfare and thought that something similar might be possible in Korea. Infiltration and subversion efforts were thus greatly stepped up against US forces and the leadership in South Korea. These efforts culminated in an attempt to storm the Blue House and assassinate President Park Chung Hee. North Korean troops thus took a much more aggressive stance toward US forces in and around South Korea, engaging US Army troops in fire-fights along the Demilitarized Zone. The 1968 capture of the crew of the spy ship USS Pueblo was a part of this campaign. Albania's Enver Hoxha was a fierce enemy of the country and Kim Il Sung, writing in June 1977 that "genuine Marxist-Leninists" will understand that the "ideology which is guiding the Korean Workers' Party and the Communist Party of China ... is revisionist" and later that month he added that "in Pyongyang, I believe that even Tito will be astonished at the proportions of the cult of his host [Kim Il sung], which has reached a level unheard of anywhere else, either in past or present times, let alone in a country which calls itself socialist." He further claimed that "the leadership of the Communist Party of China has betrayed [the working people]. In Korea, too, we can say that the leadership of the Korean Workers' Party is wallowing in the same waters" and claimed that Kim Il Sung was begging for aid from other countries, especially among the Eastern Bloc and non-aligned countries like Yugoslavia. As a result, relations between North Korea and Albania would remain cold and tense right up until Hoxha's death in 1985. Although a resolute anti-communist, Zaire's Mobutu Sese Seko was also heavily influenced by Kim's style of rule.

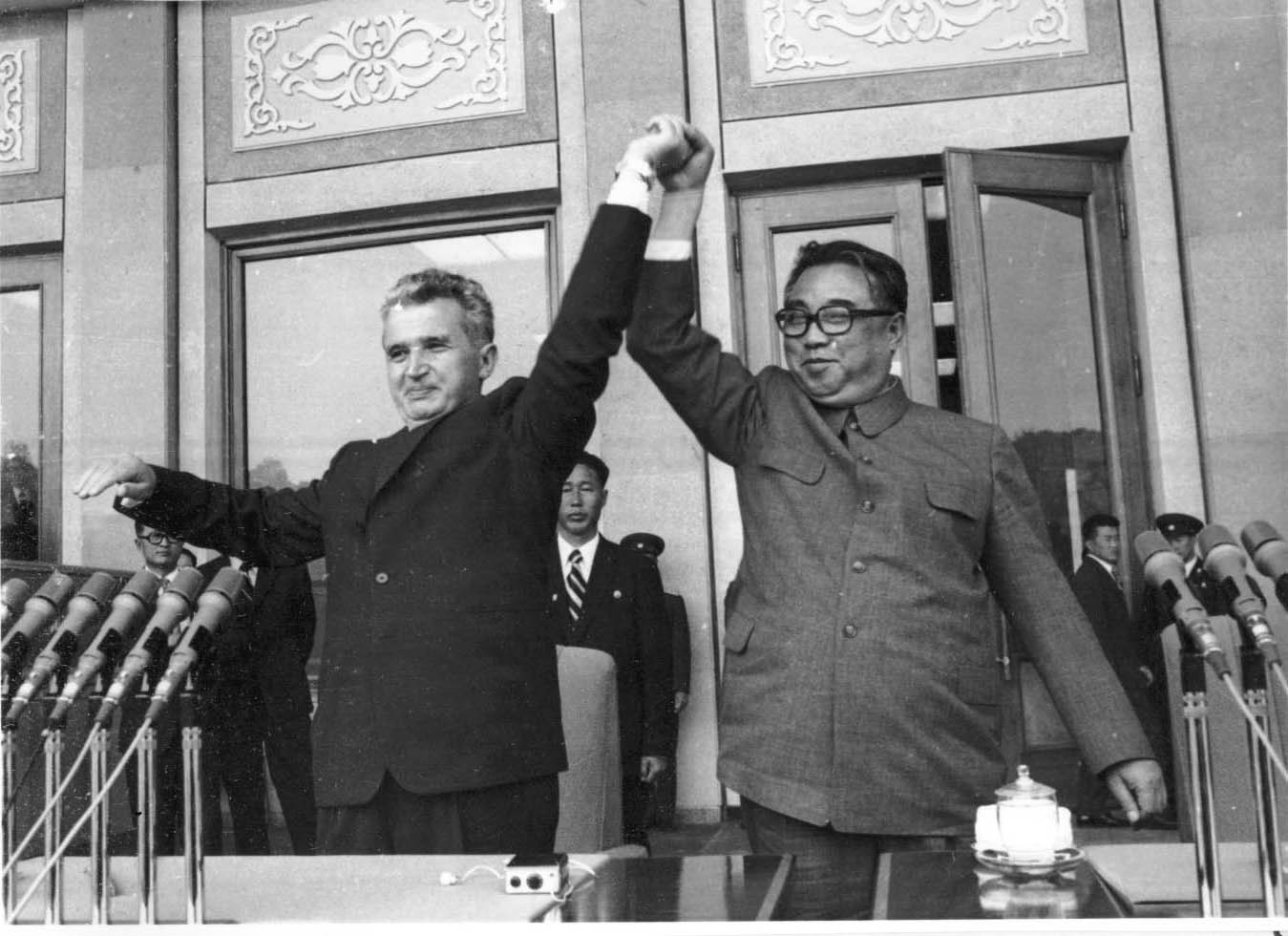
Kim and Romanian president Nicolae Ceaușescu at Moranbong Stadium, 1978

The North Korean government's practice of abducting foreign nationals, such as South Koreans, Japanese, Chinese, Thais, and Romanians, is another practice of Kim Il Sung which persists to the present day. Kim Il Sung planned these operations to seize persons who could be used to support North Korea's overseas intelligence operations, or those who had technical skills to maintain the socialist state's economic infrastructure in farms, construction, hospitals, and heavy industry. According to the Korean War Abductees Family Union (KWAFU), those abducted by North Korea after the war included 2,919 civil servants, 1,613 police, 190 judicial officers and lawyers, and 424 medical practitioners. In the hijacking and seizure of Korean Airlines flight YS-11 in 1969 by North Korean agents, the pilots and mechanics, and others with specialized skills, were the only ones never permitted to return to South Korea.

=== New constitution and the 6th Party Congress ===
Relations with South Korea improved in 1972. In May, South Korean president Park Chung Hee sent Lee Hu-rak, the then-director of the Korean Central Intelligence Agency (KCIA), to meet with Kim Il Sung. Two months later, the two sides signed the July 4 South–North Joint Statement, promising to advance Korean reunification. Kim proposed the Three Principles of National Reunification, which then became the basis of North Korea's official policy regarding reunification.

A new constitution was proclaimed on 27 December 1972, in the same year as Kim's 60th birthday, which created the position of the President of North Korea. Kim gave up the premiership, which he had held since 1948, and instead assumed office as president. On 14 April 1975, North Korea discontinued most formal use of its traditional units and adopted the metric system. At the 6th Party Congress in October 1980, Kim publicly designated his son Kim Jong Il as his successor. The Kim family was supported by the army, due to Kim Il Sung's revolutionary record and the support of the veteran defense minister, O Jin-u. In 1986, a rumor spread that Kim had been assassinated, making the concern for Jong Il's ability to succeed his father actual. Kim dispelled the rumors, however, by making a series of public appearances. It has been argued, however, that the incident helped establish the order of succession – the first apparent patrilineal in a communist state – which eventually would occur upon Kim Il Sung's death in 1994.

From the 1980s, North Korea encountered increasing economic difficulties. South Korea became an economic powerhouse fueled by Japanese and American investment, military aid, and internal economic development, while North Korea stagnated and then declined in the 1980s. During this period, Kim Il Sung directed efforts to destabilize South Korea. In October 1983, North Korean agents attempted to assassinate South Korean president Chun Doo-hwan during a visit to Rangoon, Myanmar, leading to the death of 21 people. In November 1987, North Korean agents planted a bomb on the Korean Air Flight 858, killing 115 people. The reform and opening up policy of Deng Xiaoping in China from 1979 onward meant that trade with the moribund economy of North Korea held decreasing interest for China. The Revolutions of 1989 in Eastern Europe and the dissolution of the Soviet Union, from 1989 to 1992, destabilized North Korea by undermining the ideological legitimacy and cutting Soviet-subsidized oil supply to the North Korean coal and chemical industry, contributing to the emergence of North Korean famine. In response, Kim Il Sung launched the policy of "agriculture first, light industry first, foreign trade first".

=== Final years and ensuring succession to Kim Jong Il ===
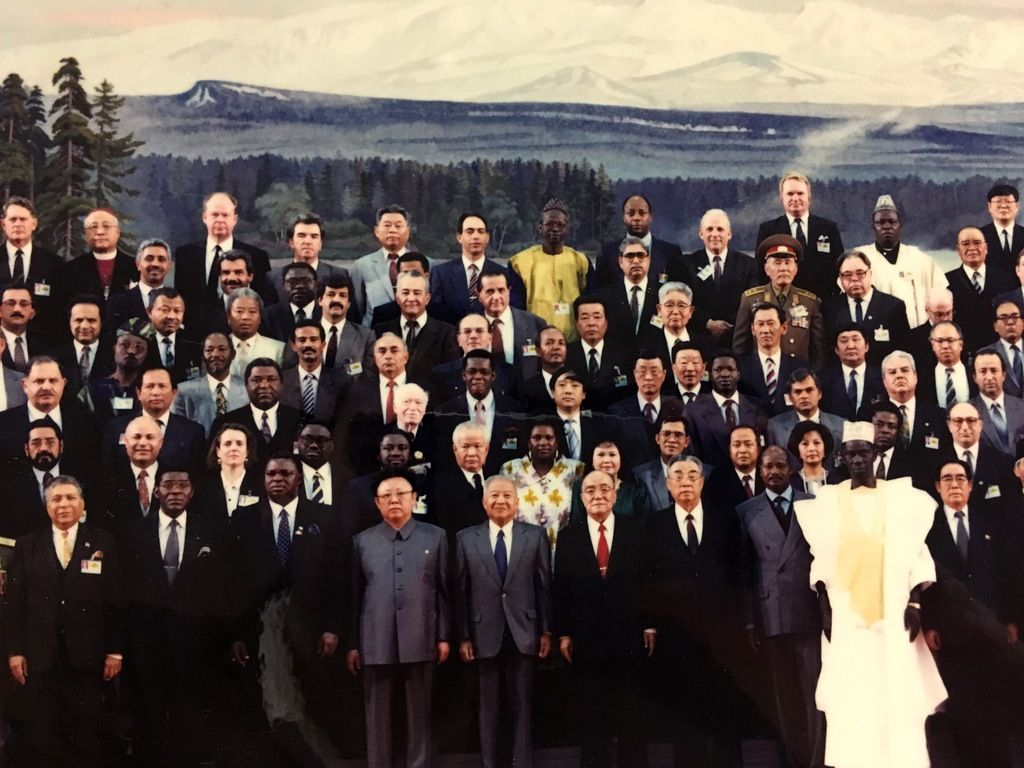
Kim Il Sung's 80th birthday ceremony with international guests, April 1992

To ensure a full succession of leadership to his son and designated successor Kim Jong Il, Kim turned over his chairmanship of North Korea's National Defense Commission – the body mainly responsible for control of the armed forces as well as the supreme commandership of the country's now million-man strong military force, the Korean People's Army – to his son in 1991 and 1993. In early 1994, Kim began investing in nuclear power to offset energy shortages brought on by economic problems. This was the first of many "nuclear crises". On 19 May 1994, Kim ordered spent fuel to be unloaded from the already disputed nuclear research facility in Yongbyon. Despite repeated chiding from Western nations, Kim continued to conduct nuclear research and carry on with the uranium enrichment program. In June 1994, former US President Jimmy Carter traveled to Pyongyang in an effort to persuade Kim to negotiate with the Clinton administration over its nuclear program. To the astonishment of the United States and the International Atomic Energy Agency, Kim agreed to halt his nuclear research program and seemed to be embarking upon a new opening to the West.

=== Death ===
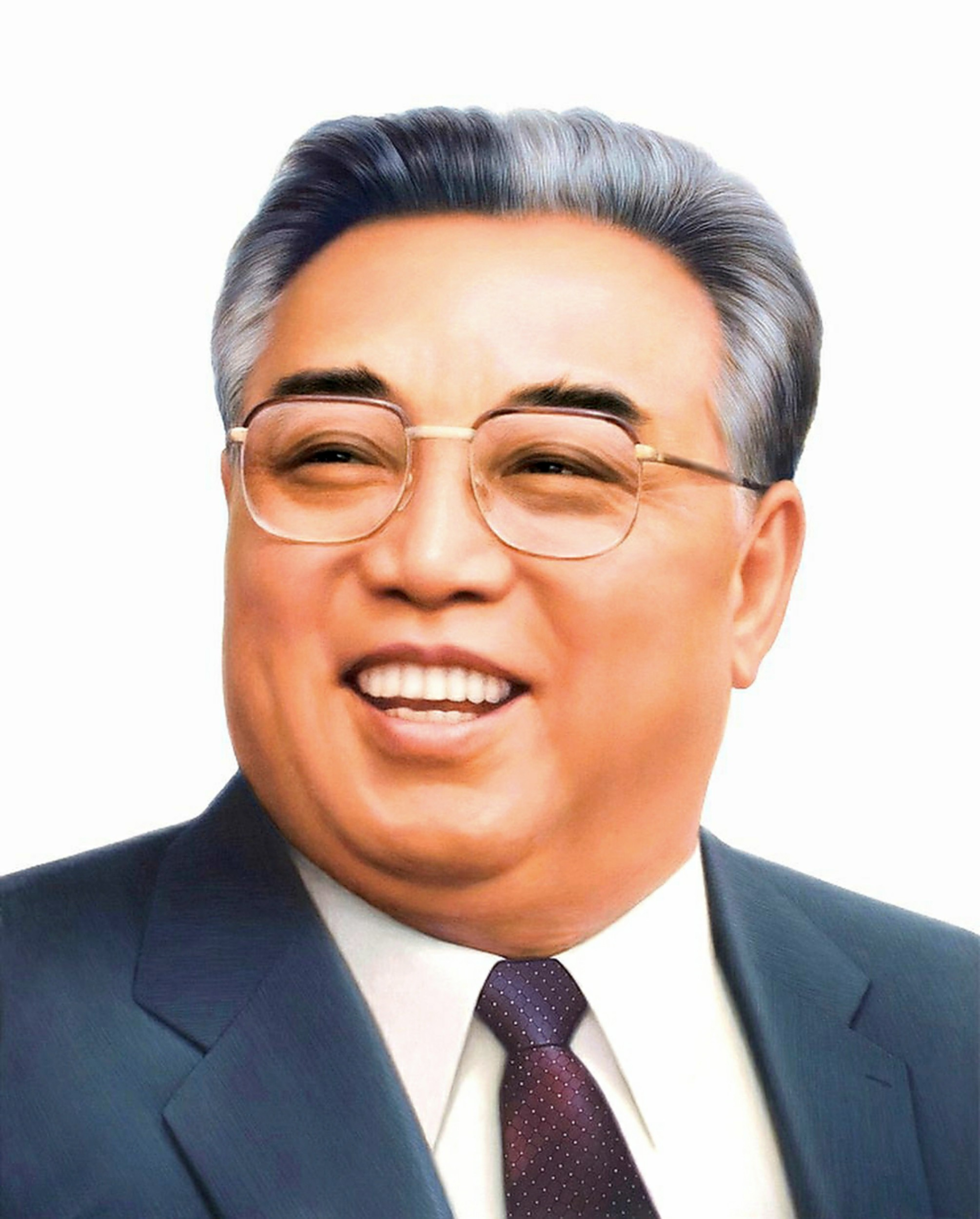
The official posthumous portrait of Kim Il Sung, issued after his death

Shortly before noon on 7 July 1994, Kim Il Sung collapsed from a heart attack at his residence in Hyangsan, North Pyongan. After the heart attack, Kim Jong Il ordered the team of doctors who were constantly at his father's side to leave and arranged for the country's best doctors to be flown in from Pyongyang. After several hours, the doctors from Pyongyang arrived, but despite their efforts to save him, Kim Il Sung died at 02:00 am PST on 8 July 1994, aged 82. His death was declared 34 hours later.

Kim Il Sung's death resulted in nationwide mourning and a ten-day mourning period was declared by Kim Jong Il. His funeral was scheduled to be held on 17 July 1994 in Pyongyang but was delayed until 19 July. It was attended by hundreds of thousands of people who were flown into the city from all over North Korea. Kim Il Sung's body was placed in a public mausoleum at the Kumsusan Palace of the Sun, where his preserved and embalmed body lies under a glass coffin for viewing purposes. His head rests on a traditional Korean pillow and he is covered by the flag of the Workers' Party of Korea. Newsreel video of the funeral at Pyongyang was broadcast on several networks and can now be found on various websites. The position of President of North Korea was not inherited by Kim Jong Il. In a 1998 amendment, the presidency was written out of the constitution, and the document's preamble named Kim Il Sung as the country's "Eternal President" to honor his memory.

== Ideology ==
Kim Il Sung's most notable contribution to political theory is his conceptualization of the Juche idea, originally described as a variant of Marxism–Leninism.

In his writings, Kim engaged with Karl Marx's metaphor that religion is the opium of the people. He did so both in the context of responding to his comrades who objected to working with religious groups (Chonbulygo and Chondoism, respectively). In the first instance, Kim replies that a person is "mistaken" if he or she believes Marx's proposition regarding "opium of the people" can be applied in all instances, explaining that if a religion "prays for dealing out divine punishment to Japan and blessing the Korean nation" then it is a "patriotic religion" and its believers are patriots. In the second, Kim states that Marx's metaphor "must not be construed radically and unilaterally" because Marx was warning against "the temptation of a religious mirage and not opposing believers in general." Because the communist movement in Korea was fighting a struggle for "national salvation" against Japan, Kim writes that anyone with a similar agenda can join the struggle and that "even a religionist ... must be enrolled in our ranks without hesitation."

== Personal life and characteristics ==
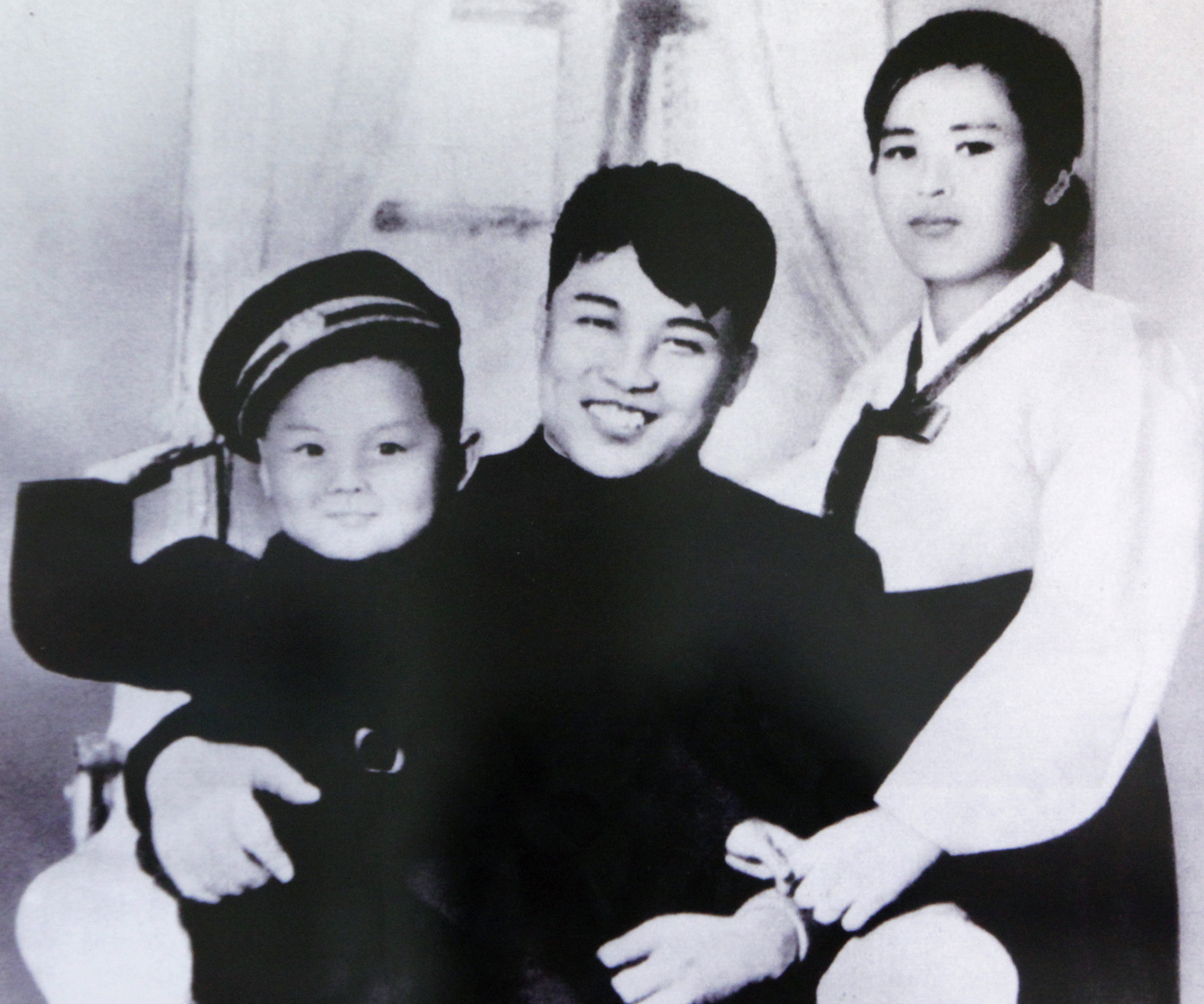
Kim Il Sung, his second wife, Kim Jong Suk, and their son, Kim Jong Il

Kim Il Sung is believed to have married 3 times, although virtually nothing is known about his first wife. His second wife, Kim Jong Suk (1917–1949), gave birth to two sons and one daughter before her death in childbirth during the delivery of a stillborn girl. Kim Jong Il was his oldest son. The other son (Kim Man-il, or Alexandrovich Kim) of this marriage died in 1947 in a swimming accident. A daughter, Kim Kyong-hui, was born in 1946.

Kim married Kim Song-ae (1924–2014) in 1952, and had four children with her: Kim Kyong Suk (1951–), Kim Kyong Jin (1952–), Kim Pyong Il (1954–), and Kim Yong Il (1955–2000, not to be confused with the former Premier of North Korea with the same name). Kim Pyong-il was prominent in Korean politics until he became ambassador to Hungary. In 2015, Kim Pyong Il became the ambassador to the Czech Republic; he officially retired in 2019 and returned to North Korea.

Kim was reported to have had other children with women to whom he was not married. They included Kim Hyŏn-nam (born 1972, head of the Propaganda and Agitation Department of the Workers' Party since 2002).

=== Health ===
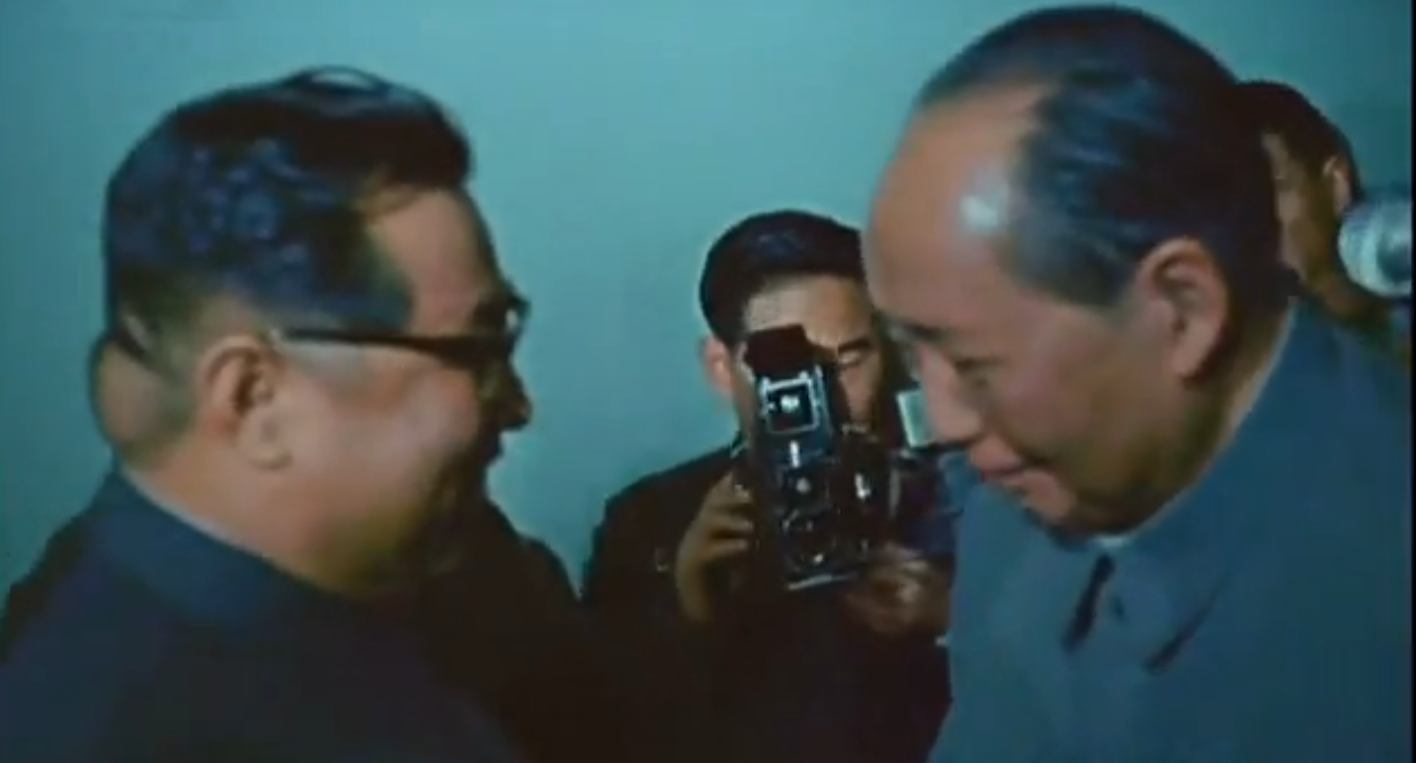
Kim's tumor is noticeable on the back of his head in this rare newsreel still image during a diplomatic meeting between him and Chinese Communist Party Chairman Mao Zedong in Beijing, 1970.

As he aged, starting in the 1970s, Kim developed a calcinosis growth on the right side of the back of his neck. It was long believed that its close proximity to his brain and spinal cord made it inoperable. However, Juan Reinaldo Sánchez, a defected bodyguard for Fidel Castro who met Kim in 1986 wrote later that it was Kim's own paranoia that prevented it from being operated on. Because of its unappealing nature, North Korean reporters and photographers were required to photograph Kim while standing slightly to his left in order to hide the growth from official photographs and newsreels. Hiding the growth became increasingly difficult as the growth reached the size of a baseball by the late 1980s.

== Awards ==
According to North Korean sources, Kim Il Sung had received 230 foreign orders, medals and titles from 70 countries since the 1940s until, and after, his death. They include: The Soviet Order of the Red Banner and the Order of Lenin (twice), Star of the Republic of Indonesia (first class), the Bulgarian Order of Georgi Dimitrov (twice), the Togolese Order of Mono (Grand Cross), the Order of the Yugoslav Star (Great Star), the Cuban Order of José Martí (twice), the East German Order of Karl Marx (twice), the Maltese Xirka Ġieħ ir-Repubblika, the Burkinabe Order of the Gold Star of Nahouri, Order of the Grand Star of Honour of Socialist Ethiopia, the Nicaraguan Augusto Cesar Sandino Order, the Vietnamese Gold Star Order, the Czechoslovak Order of Klement Gottwald, the Royal Order of Cambodia (Grand Cross), the National Order of Madagascar (first class, Grand Cross), the Mongolian Order of Sukhbaatar, and the Romanian orders of Order of Victory of Socialism and Order of the Star of the Romanian Socialist Republic (first class with band).

== Legacy ==
The original statue of Kim Il Sung on Mansudae Hill (1972–2012). The one of Kim Jong Il was added much later.

Kim Il Sung was revered as a godlike figure within North Korea during his lifetime, but his personality cult struggled to extend beyond the country's borders. There are over 500 statues of him in North Korea, similar to the many statues and monuments that Eastern Bloc countries erected of their leaders. The most prominent are at Kim Il Sung University, Kim Il Sung Stadium, Mansudae Hill, Kim Il Sung Bridge and the Immortal Statue of Kim Il Sung. Some statues have reportedly been destroyed by explosions or damaged with graffiti by North Korean dissidents. Eternal Life monuments have been erected throughout the country, each dedicated to the departed Eternal Leader.

Kim Il Sung's image is prominent in places associated with public transportation, especially his posthumous portrait released in 1994, which hangs at every North Korean train station and airport. It is also placed prominently near the border crossings between China and North Korea. At the border outside of Yanji, South Korean tourists could pay the local Chinese residents for a picture taken against the scenery of North Korea beyond the Tumen River, with the portrait of Kim Il Sung looming large at the background. Thousands of gifts to Kim Il Sung from foreign leaders are housed in the International Friendship Exhibition. Kim Il Sung's birthday, "Day of the Sun", is celebrated every year as a public holiday in North Korea. The associated April Spring Friendship Art Festival gathers hundreds of artists from all over the world.

During his rule, North Korea's government was responsible for widespread human rights abuses. Kim Il Sung punished real and perceived dissent through purges which included public executions and enforced disappearances. Not only dissenters but their entire extended families were punished by being reduced to the lowest songbun rank, and many of them were also incarcerated in a secret system of political prison camps. These camps or kwanliso, a part of Kim's vast network of abusive penal and forced labor institutions, were fenced and heavily guarded colonies which were located in mountainous areas of the country, where prisoners were forced to perform back-breaking labor such as logging, mining, and picking crops. Most of the prisoners were incarcerated in these camps for their entire lives, and inside the camps, their living and working conditions were usually deadly. For example, prisoners were nearly starved to death, they were denied medical care, they were denied proper housing and clothes, they were subjected to sexual violence, they were regularly mistreated, and they were tortured and executed by guards.

An internal CIA study acknowledged various achievements of the North Korean government post-war, including compassionate care for war orphans and children in general, a radical improvement in the status of women, free housing, free healthcare, and health statistics particularly in life expectancy and infant mortality that were comparable to even the most advanced nations up until the years of famine. Life expectancy in the North was 72 before the famine which was only marginally lower than in the South. The country once boasted a healthcare system that was enviable; pre-famine North Korea had a network of nearly 45,000 family practitioners with some 800 hospitals and 1,000 clinics.

== Works ==
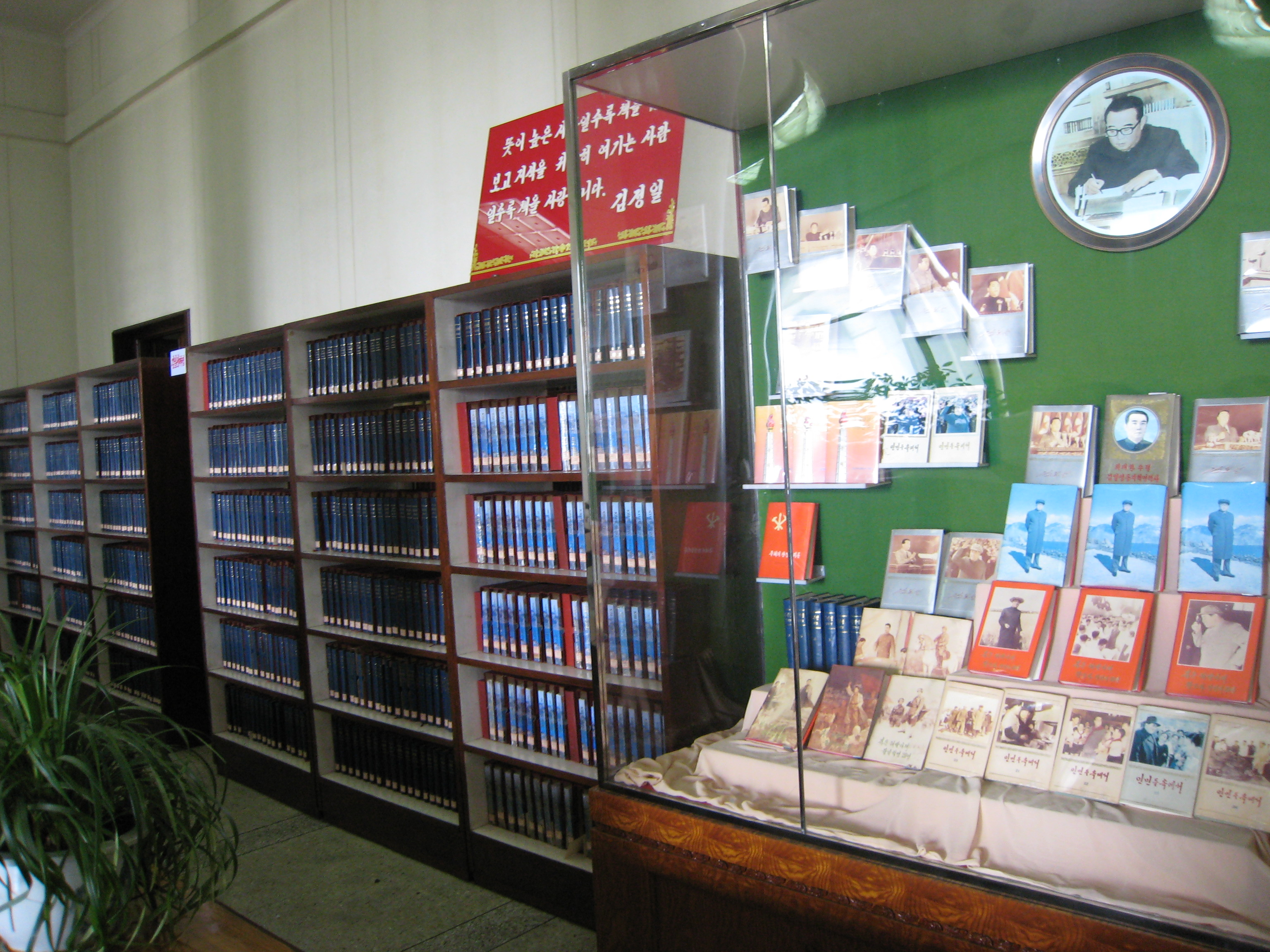
Collection of books written by Kim Il Sung

Kim Il Sung was the author of many works. According to North Korean sources, these amount to approximately 10,800 speeches, reports, books, treatises, and others. Some, such as the 100-volume Complete Collection of Kim Il Sung's Works (김일성전집), are published by the Workers' Party of Korea Publishing House. Shortly before his death, he published an eight-volume autobiography, With the Century.

According to official North Korean sources, Kim Il Sung was the original writer of many plays and operas. One of these, a revolutionary theatrical opera called The Flower Girl, was adapted into a locally produced feature film in 1972.

== See also ==
- Kim family (North Korea)
- List of Kim Il Sung's titles
- List of international trips made by Kim Il Sung
- List of things named after Kim Il Sung
- Song of General Kim Il Sung
- Residences of North Korean leaders
- Kwalliso
- Slavery in Korea
- Prisons in North Korea
- Korean independence movement
- Communism in Korea
- History of North Korea
- Politics of North Korea

== Notes ==
Government offices
New title	Premier of North Korea; 1948–1972	Succeeded by Kim Il
Preceded by Choe Yong-gon as President of the Presidium of the Supreme People's Assembly	President of North Korea; 1972–1994	Succeeded by Yang Hyong-sop as Chairman of the Standing Committee of the Supreme People's Assembly
New title	Chairman of the National Defence Commission; 1972–1993	Succeeded by Kim Jong Il
Party political offices
Preceded by Ho Ka-i	First Secretary of the Communist Party of Korea; 1932–1945	Succeeded by Himself as General Secretary of the Communist Party of Korea
New title	General Secretary of the Communist Party of Korea; 1945–1966	Himself as General Secretary of the Workers' Party of Korea
New title	Chairman of the Workers' Party of Korea; 1949–1966	Himself as General Secretary of the Workers' Party of Korea
New title	Chairman of the WPK Organization Bureau; 1949–1951	Succeeded by Pak Yong-bin
New title	Chairman of the WPK Central Military Commission; 1962–1994	Vacant Title next held by Kim Jong Il
New title	General Secretary of the Workers' Party of Korea; 1966–1994	Vacant Title next held by Kim Jong Il
Military offices
Preceded by Choe Yong-gon	Supreme Commander of the Korean People's Army; 1950–1991	Succeeded by Kim Jong Il
