= Grigory Mekler =

Soviet military officer (1909–2005)

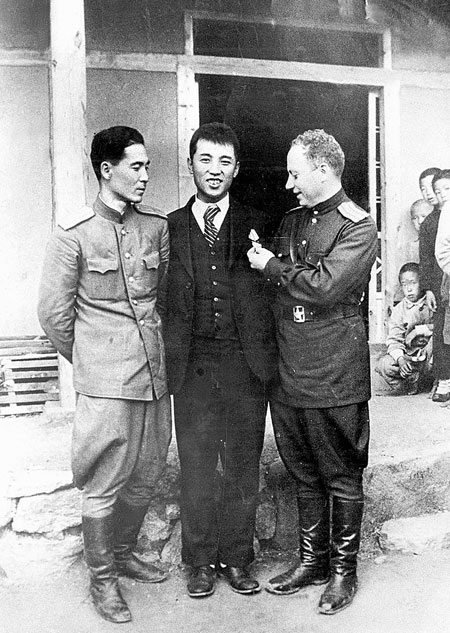
- Mikhail Khan, Kim Il Sung, and Mekler on 14 October 1945
- Born: 26 June 1909; Baevo, Belarus, Russian Empire
- Died: August 10, 2005 (aged 96)
- Education: Moscow State University
- Military career
- Allegiance: Soviet Union
- Branch: Red Army
- Known for: Advisor to Kim Il Sung (1945–1946)

Grigory Konovich Mekler (Russian: Григорий Конович Меклер; 26 June 1909 – 10 August 2005) was a Soviet military officer and linguist. Mekler served as an early advisor to Kim Il Sung, the first leader of North Korea, between 1945 and 1946.

After the fall of the Soviet Union, Mekler gave a number of interviews about his first-hand experiences with Kim. These are now considered to be valuable evidence for historians of North Korea.

== Early life and education ==
Mekler was born on 26 June 1909 in Baevo, Belarus, Russian Empire. He was born into a large Jewish family. His father was a blacksmith.

In 1924, he moved to Odesa, where he trained to be a painter, and graduated three years later. He joined the Komsomol in 1926. With Komsomol funding, he then attended the Krasnodar Pedagogical Institute (Краснодарского пединститута), where he studied philosophy. After his second year, he transferred to Moscow State University. He later graduated in 1933 with a degree in history.

== Military career ==
Mekler originally planned to continue onto graduate studies, but he instead attended the Institute of Oriental Studies of the Russian Academy of Sciences at the recommendation of the Central Committee of the Communist Party. There, he studied German, English, and Japanese for a year, and received combat training. By the end of 1934, he had the rank of junior lieutenant (Младший лейтенант). He was then sent as a military translator to the 48th Fighter Aviation Regiment, and deployed to the Russian Far East. There, he participated in the Soviet–Japanese border conflicts.

From 1937 to 1940, Mekler worked in the intelligence department of the Special Red Banner Far Eastern Army. By 1940, he reached the rank of podpolkovnik (lieutenant colonel). From 1940 to 1946, led the special propaganda department of the 25th Army in Khabarovsk. There, Mekler studied rudimentary Korean and Japanese. From 1941 to 1942, he participated in the Battle of Moscow.

=== Meeting Kim Il Sung ===
Mekler first met Kim in 1944, while Kim was training in a Soviet army camp in Vyatskoye, near Khabarovsk. Commander of the Far East Front Kirill Meretskov tasked Mekler with cooperating closely with Kim, and focusing on improving Kim's domestic image and credibility. According to Mekler, Meretskov told him: (Note: Под Хабаровском у нас есть китайская бригада во главе с Чжоу Баочжуном. Она состоит из двух основных батальонов: китайского и корейского. Мы должны поехать туда и познакомиться с ней. Проведем там занятия. Ты возьмешь на себя комбата Кореи, а я - Китая. Поговори со своим, всесторонне проверь, что он из себя представляет, на что способен.)

Near Khabarovsk we have a Chinese brigade led by Zhou Baozhong. It has two main battalions: one Chinese and one Korean. We must go there and become acquainted with it. We'll run classes there. You will take the Korean battalion commander, and I the Chinese. Talk to him; really get to know him, see who he really is and what he's capable of.

The day afterwards, Mekler met Kim. Mekler was reportedly pleasantly surprised. He liked Kim's character and education, and felt that while Kim was firm with his subordinates, they genuinely liked—even loved—him. He also found Kim to be an adequate speaker of Russian (albeit with an accent).

In April 1945, Soviet headquarters requested that the Vyatskoye leadership recommend a leader for a potential new Korean state. Mekler interviewed a number of candidates for the position, including Kim. He eventually recommended that Kim be the new leader; according to Mekler, he later learned that his recommendation was instrumental in the Soviet's decision to move forward with Kim. (Note: Mekler also witnessed Kim moments after Kim's receipt of the Order of the Red Banner from Meretskov. In 2005, Mekler noted that the Soviet Union later tried to censor and downplay information about their giving Kim the award beginning in the mid 1950s. He attributed this to souring Soviet-North Korean relations after the death of Soviet leader Joseph Stalin and the political fallout of the Korean War.) But Kim was not starting from scratch; he was already somewhat well-regarded in Korea for his role as a Korean independence activist and guerrilla against the Japanese. Still, Meretskov reportedly told Mekler: (Note: Займись этим человеком. Впервые за много лет отсутствия ему предстоит вернуться в Северную Корею. Его там никто почти не знает, и он мало кого. Объездишь с ним там все уголки, познакомишь со страной, с людьми. Это вам обоим пойдет на пользу.)

Take care of [Kim]. After many years of absence, he is now returning to North Korea. He hardly knows anyone there, and hardly anyone there knows him. Go with him to all corners of the country, get to know the country, its people. This will benefit both of you.

=== Advisor to Kim in North Korea ===
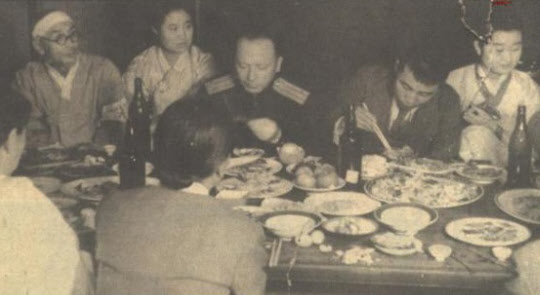
Cho (leftmost), Mekler, and Kim during a dinner in October 1945. Several kisaeng (female entertainers) can be seen in the background.

Kim arrived in Pyongyang on 19 September 1945. Mekler arrived shortly afterwards, and met Kim there. Mekler claims to have arranged and witnessed the first meeting between Kim and Cho Man-sik at 6 pm on 30 September 1945. (Note: The meeting was, on the surface, amicable. Cho did not drink, but Mekler became drunker than the others, to their amusement.) Cho has been described as Kim's rival for leadership in the North, and initially had stronger domestic recognition and support than Kim.

Between his arrival in Korea and his departure in 1946, Mekler toured North Korea with Kim, coordinating events, editing Kim's speeches, and organizing security. They met almost every day. Their relationship was friendly (but clearly professional, according to Mekler), and Mekler found Kim very agreeable. In 2005, Mekler claimed he could not remember a single instance where Kim pushed back against his suggestions. Despite Mekler's basic competence in Korean, he still needed a translator for most conversations. This role was filled by Mikhail Khan; a Koryo-saram (ethnic Korean Soviet) fluent in both Russian and Korean. Thus, Mekler, Kim, and Khan became a consistent trio.

According to Mekler, he organized a hike for youths and journalists to Kim's birthplace, to mark Kim's return to his hometown. The event was prominently covered in newspapers. On another occasion, he organized a rally related to an accidental death by drowning of a young girl. A Soviet band played mourning music in public, which drew a crowd. The girl's parents had vowed to commit suicide, but Mekler had Kim dissuade them. Kim then told the crowd that "[l]ike Stalin, [he would] take care of every single working person". He then offered the parents a trip to a Soviet sanatorium to recuperate. The rally was well received. Mekler observed Kim's reputation gradually improving. In 2003, he said that "Sometimes after [Kim's] speeches at demonstrations there was silence, but later people started clapping".

On 7 March 1946, during discussions between the United States and Soviet Union about the establishment of a joint North-South Korean government, Mekler recommended that Kim serve as the government's Minister of National Defense.

In 1946, Mekler was reassigned to a position in Siberia. Before his departure, Kim asked him for a final piece of advice. He allegedly told Kim the English-language idiom: "Look before you leap". The two then silently hugged, and Mekler departed.

== After North Korea ==
Afterwards, contact between him and Kim virtually ceased. The next time Mekler met Kim was in 1950, when Kim visited Moscow. This visit was allegedly when Kim asked Stalin for Soviet approval to invade South Korea and begin the Korean War.

From December 1946 to 1948, he managed the repatriation of Japanese prisoners of war in the Siberian Military District. Afterwards, he lectured at the political department in the District until 1949, and at the Irkutsk High Military Aviation Engineering School until he was discharged from the military in 1955.

From 1957 to 1982, he worked as a researcher at the Oriental Studies Institute of the Russian Academy of Sciences. There, he produced books, articles, and lectures about North Korea, including a book on the economy of South Korea (a topic that was otherwise banned at the time). He also received the title Honoured Cultural Worker of the RSFSR during this time.

After the collapse of the Soviet Union and until his death, he was extensively interviewed by academics and journalists, and appeared in a number of documentaries about North Korea. His documents and testimonies are now considered valuable evidence for historians of Korea. Some films Mekler appeared in drew the ire of the North Korean Embassy. In 1994, the journalist Leonid Mlechin, who produced a documentary that prominently featured Mekler, reported that he received a call from the embassy with a threatening message: "If it goes on the air, you will end up in a morgue".

== Death ==
By 2004, Mekler lived in a "modest" Moscow apartment, and was paralyzed from the waist-down. He died on 10 August 2005.
