= Kim Kyung-cheon =

Korean independence activist (1888–1942)

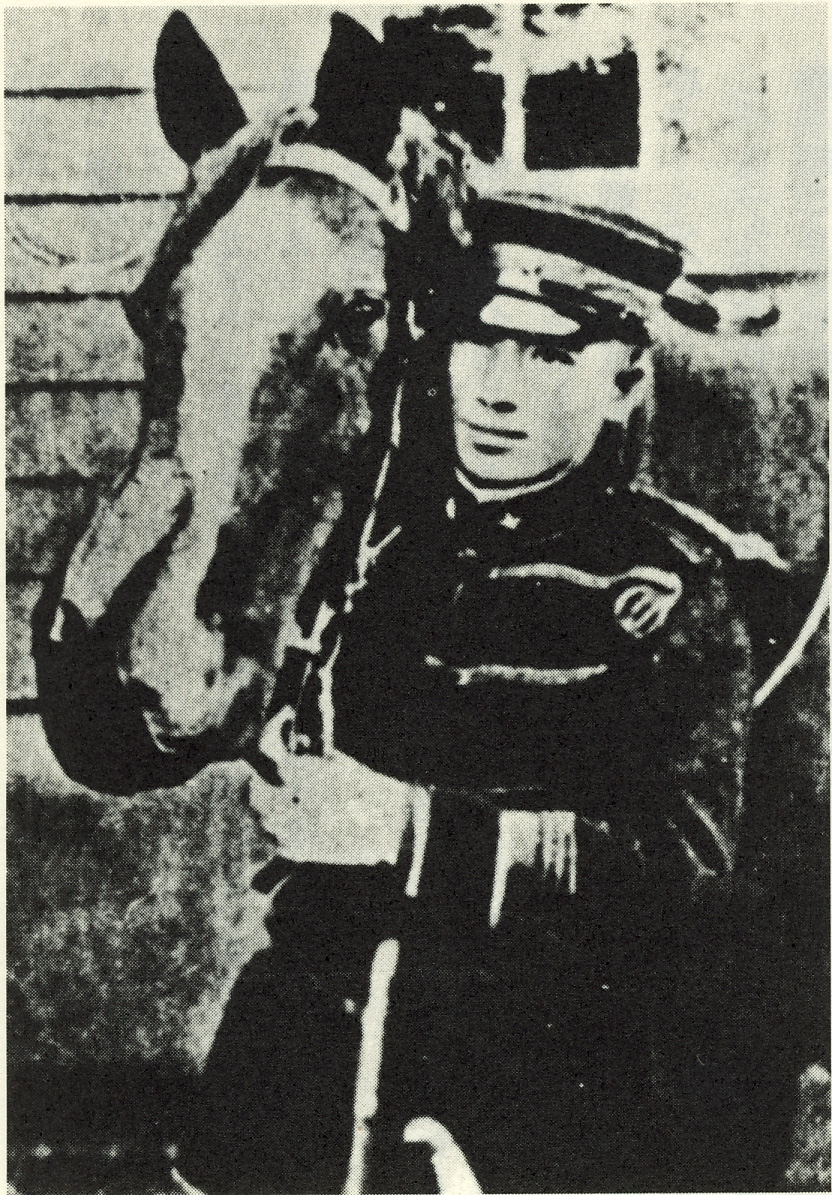

Korean name
- Hangul: 김광서
- Hanja: 金光瑞
- RR: Gim Gwangseo
- MR: Kim Kwangsŏ

Other names
- Hangul: 김경천, 김응천
- Hanja: 金擎天, 金應天
- RR: Gim Gyeongcheon, Gim Eungcheon
- MR: Kim Kyŏngch'ŏn, Kim Ŭngch'ŏn

Kim Kyung-cheon (Korean: 김경천; 5 June 1888 – 2 January 1942) was a Korean independence activist and military leader.

== Early life ==
In 1888, he was born in a rich, Yangban-traditioned family in South Hamgyong Province, Pukchong County, as the fifth son of his father Kim Jeong-woo. His original name was Kim Ung-chon. In 1909, he married You Jong. He later entered the Imperial Japanese Army Academy and graduated in 1911, attaining the rank of cavalry lieutenant in the Imperial Japanese Army.

== Korean independence activism ==
In June 1919, he fled to Manchuria along with Chi Chong-chon to join the Korean independence movement, working as a trainer but after only six months he communicated with some Korean activists and moved to Vladivostok to fight under Kim Kyu, who was renowned for victory over a Japanese battalion. His main operation after arriving in Vladivostok was fighting off Japanese-supported Chinese militias. In this period he chose Kim Kyung-cheon as a pseudonym. During the Russian Civil War, his troops managed to impress Red Army commanders with good discipline. In January 1923, he attended the conference of Korean Provisional Government in Shanghai and decided to create a communist Korean regime which would be based in the Soviet Union. However, the Comintern denied the "republic's" legitimacy as an independent entity, leading Ji to leave the Soviet Union while Kim remained. During the Great Purge, Kim was arrested for protesting against Joseph Stalin's Korean Dislocation policy and eventually died in a Soviet prison. He and Chi Ch'ŏngch'ŏn and Shin Dong-cheon were called "3 cheons of South Manchuria" (南满三天). He was also referred to as 擎天金将軍 (경천 김장군) (literally meaning "Heaven-supporting General Kim") by Koreans in Manchuria.

Several sources believe North Korean leader Kim Il Sung stole his identity after his death. Lee Myung-young published a book The Legend of Kim Il-sung in 1974 in which she asserted that the original General Kim Il Sung was an Imperial Japanese Army Academy graduate.
