= Mickler =

Mickler is a surname. Notable people with the surname include:

== People with the surname ==
- Ernest Matthew Mickler (1940–1988), American cookbook author
- Georg Mickler (1892–1915), German Olympic athlete
- Ingrid Becker (Ingrid Mickler-Becker, born 1942), West German athlete, sometimes recorded incorrectly as Ingrid Mickler
- Michael Mickler, alumnus of the Unification Theological Seminary

== Fictional characters ==
- Jack and Marilyn Mickler, in the 1995 film Don Juan DeMarco

== See also ==
- Mackler, a surname
- Mickler-O'Connell Bridge, over the Matanzas River, Florida, U.S.
