= Mackler =

Mackler is a surname. Notable people with the surname include:

== People with the surname ==
- Aaron L. Mackler (fl. from 2000), American rabbi
- Carolyn Mackler (born 1973), American author
- Jacob Mackler, American gang lawyer killed in 1923 by gang leader William Colbeck
- Jeff Mackler (fl. from 2006), American activist
- Paul Mackler, CEO of Cygnus Business Media, 2000–2006
- Ronald Mackler, key figure in the development of BMX racing
- Steven D. Mackler, director of Neon Maniacs (1986 film), Voodoo Dawn, and other horror films

== Fictional characters ==
- Henry Mackler, in One Life to Live

== See also ==
- Meckler, a surname
- Mickler, a surname
- Makeléer, a Swedish noble family
