= Vyatskoye, Khabarovsk Krai =

Village in Khabarovsk Krai, Russia

Vyatskoye Вятское
- Selo
- Interactive map of Vyatskoye
- Location within Khabarovsk Krai Location within Russia
- Coordinates: 48°44′N 135°43′E
- Country: Russia
- Federal subject: Khabarovsk Krai

Population (2010 Census)
  - Total: 1,193
  - Estimate (2021): 891 (−25.3%)
- Time zone: UTC+10 (MSK+7)
- Postal code: 680525
- OKTMO ID: 08655416106

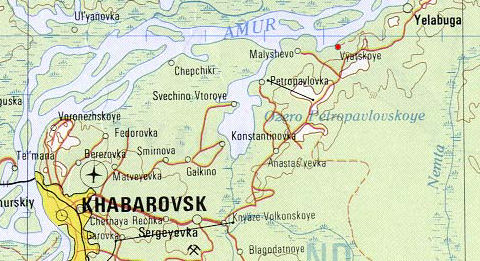
Vyatskoye's location within Khabarovsk Krai

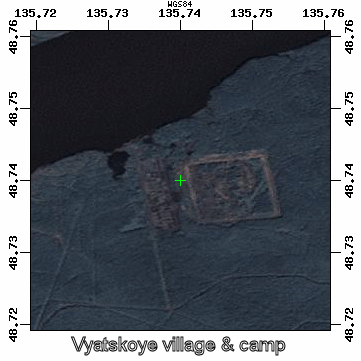
Landsat7 image of Vyatskoye village and camp

Vyatskoye (Russian: Вя́тское) (alternatively known as Viatsk or Viatskoe) is a small fishing village in Khabarovsky District, Khabarovsk Krai, Russia, located on the east side of the Amur River, 70 kilometers (43 mi) northeast of Khabarovsk. The 76th Radio Technical Brigade is stationed there.

== History ==
The original inhabitants were likely various Tungusic peoples.

Vyatskoye along with Khabarovsk and Vladivostok was ceded to Imperial Russia by the Qing dynasty as part of Outer Manchuria in the 1860 Convention of Peking.

During World War II near Vyatskoye was a camp for the Soviet 88th Brigade, which was made up of Korean and Chinese guerrillas. Kim Il Sung, future leader of North Korea, was stationed there as a Captain in the Soviet Red Army commanding a battalion, and according to some sources his family was there as well. According to those same sources his son Kim Jong Il was born there on February 16, 1941 (although the North Korean government claims Kim Jong Il was born on Paektu Mountain in Japanese Korea a year later, on February 16, 1942). Residents of the town claim that his brother Shura Kim (sometimes known as the first Kim Pyong-il) fell into a well and died, and was buried there; however other sources claim that Kim Jong Il's sibling drowned in a pool in Pyongyang in 1947.

== Notes ==
1. "A Visit to Kim Jong Il's Russian Birthplace". National Public Radio. 12 February 2004. audio file
2. Chung Byoung-sun (22 August 2002). "Sergeyevna Remembers Kim Jong Il". The Chosun Ilbo. Archived from the original on 24 November 2002.
