= Women in the North Korean Revolution =

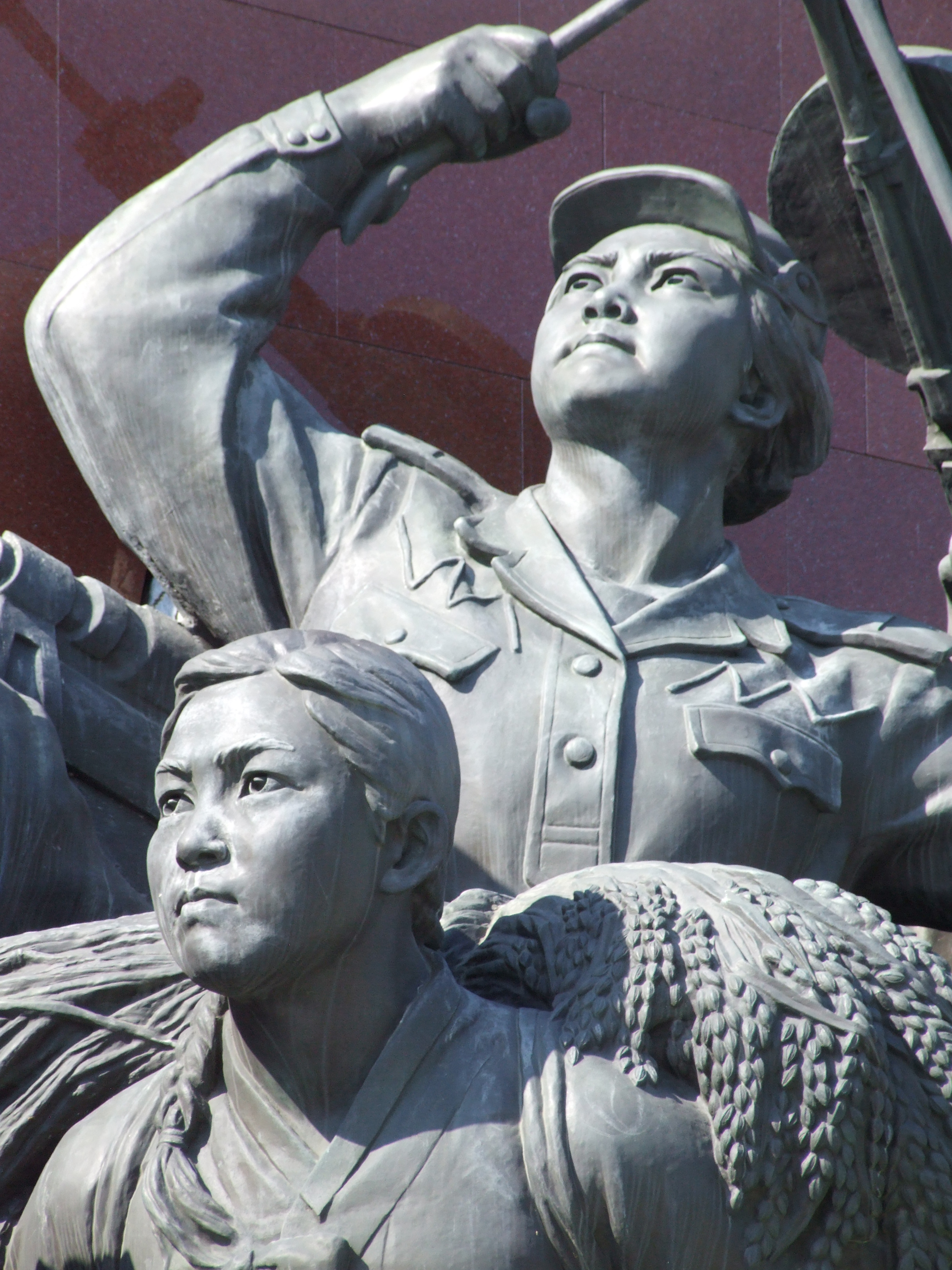
A female soldier and peasant, detail of the Mansu Hill Grand Monument

Women gained an unprecedented amount of social and legal reforms during the North Korean revolution (1945–1950). The laws promulgated by Kim Il Sung's regime formally accorded women rights that during the Japanese colonial era and previous generations were denied to them. Women were allowed to enter the workforce alongside men and were granted privileges — the right to an education, the right to own and inherit property, the right to political participation — that incorporated women in the public realm. Various women's organizations such as the Korean Democratic Women's League propped up to maintain these laws and nurse the auxiliary needs of the regime. North Korea (DPRK) continued to shoulder neo-Confucian virtues that extolled sacrificial motherhood and added a new emphasis on the nuclear family.

== Legal reforms ==
The North Korean government initiated a series of social reforms that sought to reintegrate the traditionally underprivileged elements — workers, peasants, women, and youth — into society during the early years of the revolution (1945-1950). These sweeping social reforms brought a measure of women's liberation and active participation in civic life. For the first time in Korean history, the recognition of women as a category of people with rights was quite novel for its time. Kim Il Sung and the North Korean Provisional People's Committee (NKPPC) immediately legalized equality between the sexes in order to garner more popular support. The Labor Law of 1946 and the Law to Eradicate Feudal Practices of 1947, as well as the Law on Land Reform, the Law on the Nationalization of Essential Industries and the Law on Sex Equality, laid out the basic framework by which women's roles would be defined in North Korean society in the public and private spheres. In particular, the Law on Sex Equality "made North Korea for a time the most gender progressive state in the world." These laws allowed women to express social and economic rights that included: the right to an education, the right to own and inherit property, the right to obtain a divorce, equal pay for equal work, the eight-hour workday, and choice in marriage. The Labor Law in particular endowed women with important rights: the right to acquire maternity leave of 77 days with full pay, paid breaks from work for feeding babies, prohibition of night work or overtime for nursing or pregnant women, and easier work for pregnant women with equal pay. Following the land reform initiated by the new legislation, women were granted equal allotments as men were. The old family registry system based on male lineage was replaced with a citizen registry system in 1947. Universal suffrage was instituted, but it first faced fierce resistance from North Korean men. However, Kim Il Sung launched a campaign to eradicate illiteracy and educate women about their rights.

Women's increased freedoms in the public realm copied the Marxist–Leninist tradition that promoted women's entry into the socialist workforce as paid workers. However, the North Korean regime still maintained the traditional Confucian beliefs that extolled the centrality of family and praised revolutionary motherhood. This was articulated in a 1949 text on DPRK law crafted by the People's Committee in Kangwon Province described how "marriage and family are protected under the state." In fact, the eradication of the traditional family, the mild discouragement of divorce, and the assault on feudal practices such as concubinage and arranged marriages paved the way for the modern nuclear family. The propaganda and images spurred by the DPRK continued to praise revolutionary motherhood and represent women who embraced the traditional Korean virtues of feminine purity, self-sacrifice, and morality.

== The Democratic Women's League ==
Established in November 1945, the North Korean Democratic Women's League was one of the first organized groups to rally behind the leadership of Kim Il Sung and the NKPPC with the intent of upholding democracy, eliminating fascists and national traitors, building a strong and wealthy government, and working to overthrow feudal customs and superstitions. The Women's League worked to effect new laws regarding women and bring women more actively into political and social life, including Local People's Committee elections. By April 1949, membership had swelled significantly and every village contained roughly 5,500 members with 112 local groups. Some of the earliest projects the Women's League took on were educating women and families to enroll their children in school. Among some of the duties of members of the Women's league included engaging in economic planning, agricultural production, and various lectures and concerts for women. Some of these activities often replicated the traditional roles of women as women were often the ones expected to conserve rice in the home and mobilize for the donation of "patriotic rice." However, some women criticized the conservatism of the League because the League's program continued to pigeonhole women into the traditional roles of caregivers. Other criticisms centered on female leadership in the Women's League, which was largely held by elite wives married to high ranking party officials, school teachers, and housewives, instead of working class women.

== Competing perspectives on historical significance ==
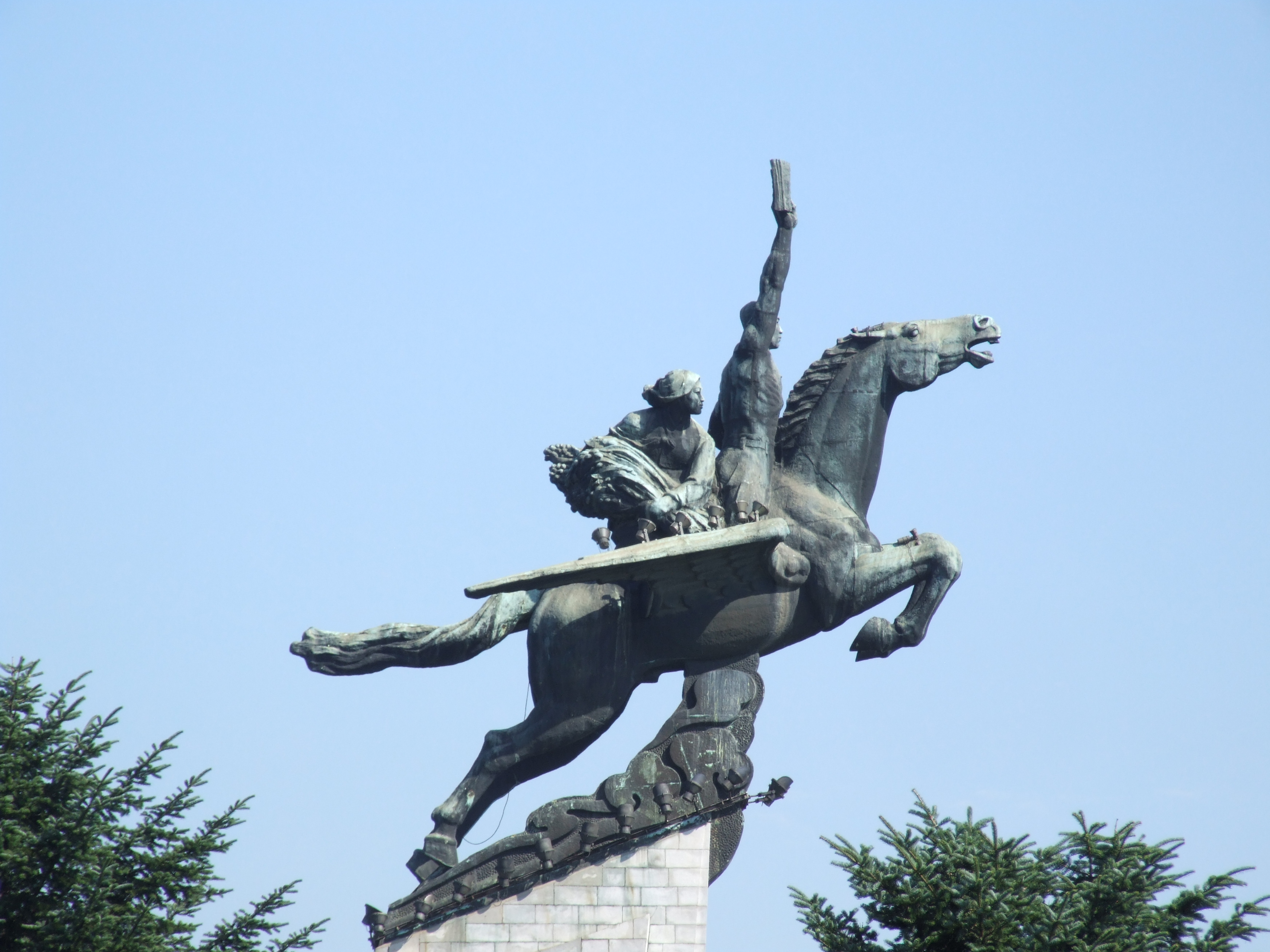
A male worker and a female farmer riding the Chollima, symbol of the Chollima Movement

After national liberation had been achieved, North Korean authorities sought to put more emphasis on socialist construction during the 1950s. Campaigns such as the Chollima Movement were initiated. At this time, policies on women changed focus, too. Legal reforms that sought to get rid of oppressive traditions was no longer the focus, and instead the government tried to make women part of the workforce. This was based on a Marxist view, drawing from Friedrich Engels, that by participating in social labor, women would be emancipated and the oppressive structure based on the family as an economic unit would be done away with. By the end of the 1950s, collectives had assumed the status formerly held by families as the main economic unit. Of particular importance for emancipation was making upbringing of children a task of the society instead of just the family. The Constitution of 1972, as well as the Law on the Nursing and Upbringing of Children of 1976 and the Socialist Labor Law of 1978 instituted mechanisms for the state to share the burden of upbringing. Nurseries, kindergartens, laundries and a more effective food sector helped women. As consequence, women's share of the workforce increased from 20% in 1956 at an annual increase rate of 19% to a total of 49% in the 1990s.

Most scholars, however, agree that the North Korean government's espousal of pro-family policies deviated from the Marxist tradition propagated by Engels, which necessitated the dismantlement of the traditional family. There are three perspective views. The first is by anti-feminist conservatives who see North Korea's communist policies leading to the disastrous breakdown of traditional society. The second is that the juxtaposition between North Korea's continual privilege of women in the public spheres and praise for women's role as educators of young children represents a new form of totalitarian patriarchy, with only lip service to women's rights. This is evidenced by the lack of female representation in North Korea's majority male political leadership and highlights the failure of the North Korean government to enforce the radical policies written in the gender equality laws. Only a few female political figures rose to prominence during the revolution: Pak Chong Ae was the first chair of the Women's League and the only female member of the Politburo, while Chong Kyong Hui and Kim Bok Sin served as alternate members. Ho Chongsuk was the first female DPRK cabinet member and she later became Minister for culture and propaganda. Kim Il Sung's wife Kim Sung-ae also chaired the Women's League. The third view generally held by feminist progressives, acknowledges the double standards placed on women during the revolution, but still celebrates the ideals carried that opened more opportunities for women.

== See also ==
- Women in North Korea
- History of North Korea

== Sources ==
=== References ===
- Armstrong, Charles K. (2003). The North Korean revolution, 1945-1950. Ithaca: Cornell University Press. ISBN 978-0-8014-4014-4.
- Kim, Suzy (2005). Politics of Empowerment: Everyday Life Within the North Korean Revolution (1945-1950) (Ph.D. thesis). University of Chicago, Department of History. OCLC 61883008.
- Park, Kyung Ae (1992). "Women and Revolution in North Korea". Pacific Affairs. 65 (4): 527–545. doi:10.2307/2760318. JSTOR 2760318.
