= Korean Woman =

Monthly magazine in North Korea

- Cover page (No. 1. 2020)
- Categories: Women's magazine
- Frequency: Monthly; Bimonthly
- Publisher: Chosŏn Yŏsŏngsa
- Founder: Socialist Women's Union of Korea
- Founded: 1946
- Country: North Korea
- Based in: Pyongyang
- Language: Korean
- Website: http://www.gpsh.edu.kp/index.php/ko/newbooks/view_meta?no=497
- ISSN: 1727-9453
- OCLC: 5806090

- Korean Woman
- Chosŏn'gŭl: 조선녀성
- Hancha: 朝鮮女性
- Revised Romanization: Joseon Yeoseong
- McCune–Reischauer: Chosŏn Yŏsŏng

Korean Woman (Korean: 조선녀성; MR: Chosŏn Yŏsŏng) is a monthly magazine in North Korea, founded in September 1946. It is the official media outlet of the Socialist Women's Union of Korea.

== History ==
The magazine started appearing regularly in 1947 and was published monthly until 1982 when it became bimonthly. The Socialist Women's Union also publishes an English-language equivalent called Women of Korea.

== Contents ==
The magazine mainly promotes the achievements and the working and living conditions of Korean women, usually accompanied by large-scale color photos. In 1976, the newspaper published an anti-South Korea propaganda poster titled "Two opposite realities".
