= History of North Korea =

The history of North Korea began with the end of World War II in 1945. The end of the Japanese occupation of Korea led to the division of Korea at the 38th parallel, with the Soviet Union occupying the north, and the United States occupying the south. The Soviet Union and the United States failed to agree on a way to unify the country, and in 1948, they established two separate governments — the Soviet-aligned Democratic People's Republic of Korea and the American-aligned Republic of Korea — each claiming to be the legitimate government of all of Korea.

In 1950, the Korean War broke out and lasted until 1953, ending with a stalemate. The previous division at the 38th parallel was replaced by the Korean Demilitarized Zone. Tension between the two sides continued, and North Korea built an industrialized command economy.

Kim Il Sung led North Korea until his death in 1994. He developed a pervasive personality cult and steered the country on an independent course in accordance with the principle of Juche (self-reliance). However, with natural disasters and the collapse of the Soviet Bloc in 1991, North Korea went into a severe economic crisis. Kim Il Sung's son, Kim Jong Il, succeeded him. Kim Jong Il was in turn succeeded by his own son, Kim Jong Un, who presently rules the country.

== Before the division ==
From 1910 to the end of World War II in 1945, Korea was under Japanese rule. Most Koreans were peasants engaged in subsistence farming. In the 1930s, Japan developed mines, hydro-electric dams, steel mills, and manufacturing plants in northern Korea and neighboring Manchuria. The Korean industrial working class expanded rapidly, and many Koreans went to work in Manchuria. As a result, 65% of Korea's heavy industry was located in the north, but, due to the rugged terrain, only 37% of its agriculture.

Northern Korea had little exposure to modern, Western ideas. One partial exception was the penetration of religion. Since the arrival of missionaries in the late nineteenth century, the northwest of Korea, and Pyongyang in particular, had been a stronghold of Christianity. As a result, Pyongyang was called the "Jerusalem of the East".

A Korean guerrilla movement emerged in the mountainous interior and in Manchuria, harassing the Japanese imperial authorities. One of the most prominent guerrilla leaders was the Communist Kim Il Sung.

== Division of Korea (1945–1950) ==
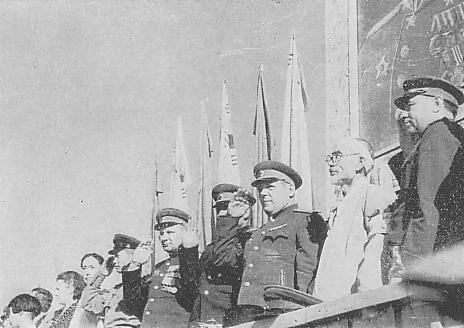
Welcome celebration for the Red Army in Pyongyang on 14 October 1945

At the Tehran Conference in November 1943 and the Yalta Conference in February 1945, the Soviet Union promised to join its allies in the Pacific War within three months of victory in Europe. On 8 August 1945, after three months to the day, the Soviet Union declared war on Japan. Soviet troops advanced rapidly, and the US government became anxious that they would occupy the whole of Korea. On 10 August, the US government decided to propose the 38th parallel as the dividing line between a Soviet occupation zone in the north and a US occupation zone in the south. The parallel was chosen as it would place the capital, Seoul, under American control. To the surprise of the Americans, the Soviet Union immediately accepted the division. The agreement was incorporated into General Order No. 1 (approved on 17 August 1945) for the surrender of Japan. The division placed sixteen million Koreans in the American zone and nine million in the Soviet zone.

Soviet forces began amphibious landings in Korea by 14 August and rapidly took over the northeast, and on 16 August they landed at Wonsan. On 24 August, the Red Army reached Pyongyang. US forces did not arrive in the south until 8 September.

Throughout August 1945, People's Committees sprang up across Korea, affiliated with the Committee for the Preparation of Korean Independence, which in September founded the People's Republic of Korea. When Soviet troops entered Pyongyang, they found a local People's Committee established there, led by veteran Christian nationalist Cho Man-sik. Unlike their American counterparts, the Soviet authorities recognized and worked with the People's Committees. By some accounts, Cho Man-sik was the Soviet government's first choice to lead North Korea.

On 19 September, Kim Il Sung and 66 other Korean Red Army officers arrived in Wonsan. They had fought the Japanese in Manchuria in the 1930s but had lived in the USSR and trained in the Red Army since 1941. On 14 October, Soviet authorities introduced Kim to the North Korean public as a guerrilla hero.

In December 1945, at the Moscow Conference, the Soviet Union agreed to a US proposal for a trusteeship over Korea for up to five years in the lead-up to independence. Most Koreans demanded independence immediately, but Kim and the other Communists supported the trusteeship under pressure from the Soviet government. Cho Man-sik opposed the proposal at a public meeting on 4 January 1946, and disappeared into house arrest. On 8 February 1946, the People's Committees were reorganized as Interim People's Committees dominated by Communists. The new regime instituted popular policies of land redistribution, industry nationalization, labor law reform, and equality for women.

Meanwhile, existing Communist groups were reconstituted as a party under Kim Il Sung's leadership. On 18 December 1945, local Communist Party committees were combined into the North Korean Communist Party. In August 1946, this party merged with the New People's Party to form the Workers' Party of North Korea. In December, a popular front led by the Workers' Party dominated elections in the North. In 1949, the Workers' Party of North Korea merged with its southern counterpart to become the Workers' Party of Korea with Kim as party chairman.

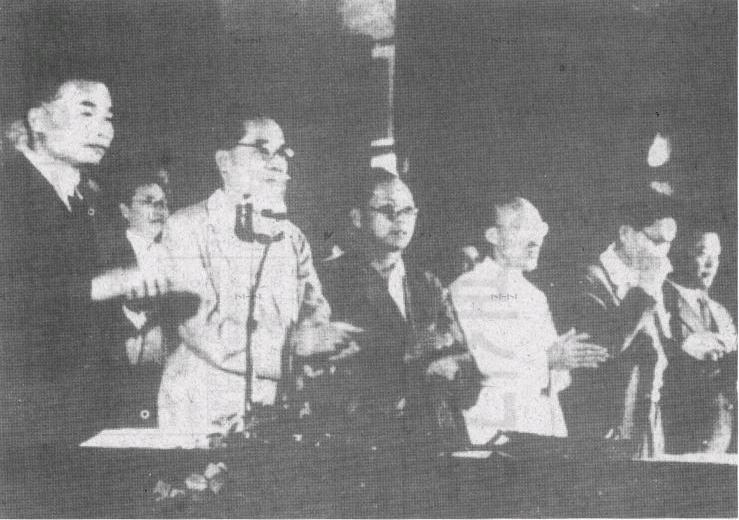
In August 1948, the 'People's Congress' was held in Haeju, Hwanghae Province. Paek Nam-un, Ho Hon, Pak Hon-yong, Hong Myong-hui

In 1946, a sweeping series of laws transformed North Korea on Soviet-style Communist lines. The "land to the tiller" reform redistributed the bulk of agricultural land to the poor and landless peasant population, effectively breaking the power of the landed class. This was followed by a "Labor Law", a "Sexual Equality Law", and a "Nationalisation of Industry, Transport, Communications and Banks Law".

Kim established the Korean People's Army (KPA) aligned with the Communists, formed from a cadre of guerrillas and former soldiers who had gained combat experience in battles against the Japanese and later Nationalist Chinese troops. From their ranks, using Soviet advisers and equipment, Kim constructed a large army skilled in infiltration tactics and guerrilla warfare. Before the outbreak of the Korean War, Joseph Stalin equipped the KPA with modern medium tanks, trucks, artillery, and small arms. Kim also formed an air force, equipped at first with ex-Soviet propeller-driven fighter and attack aircraft. Later, North Korean pilot candidates were sent to the Soviet Union and China to train in MiG-15 jet aircraft at secret bases.

=== Establishment of the Democratic People's Republic of Korea ===
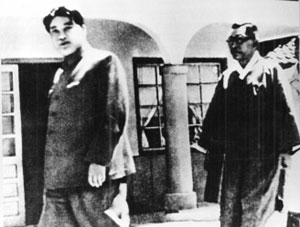
Kim Il Sung with Kim Ku in 1948

As negotiations with the Soviet Union on the future of Korea failed to make progress, the US took the issue to the United Nations in September 1947. In response, the UN established the United Nations Temporary Commission on Korea to hold elections in Korea. The Soviet Union opposed this move. In the absence of Soviet cooperation, it was decided to hold UN-supervised elections in the south only. In April 1948, a conference of organizations from the North and the South met in Pyongyang, but the conference produced no results. The southern politicians Kim Koo and Kim Kyu-sik attended the conference and boycotted the elections in the South. Both men were posthumously awarded the National Reunification Prize by North Korea. The elections were held in South Korea on 10 May 1948.

In response, the Politburo of the Communist Party of the Soviet Union instructed Shtykov to implement the Constitution of North Korea, which the People's Assembly voted to do so on 10 July, establishing the Democratic People's Republic of Korea. On 15 August, the Republic of Korea formally came into existence. In North Korea, new Supreme People's Assembly was elected in August 1948. On 12 December 1948, the United Nations General Assembly accepted the report of UNTCOK and declared the Republic of Korea to be the "only lawful government in Korea".

By 1949, North Korea was a full-fledged Communist state. All parties and mass organizations joined the Democratic Front for the Reunification of the Fatherland, ostensibly a popular front but in reality dominated by the Communists. The government moved rapidly to establish a political system that was partly styled on the Soviet system, with political power monopolised by the Workers' Party of Korea (WPK).

== Korean War (1950–1953) ==
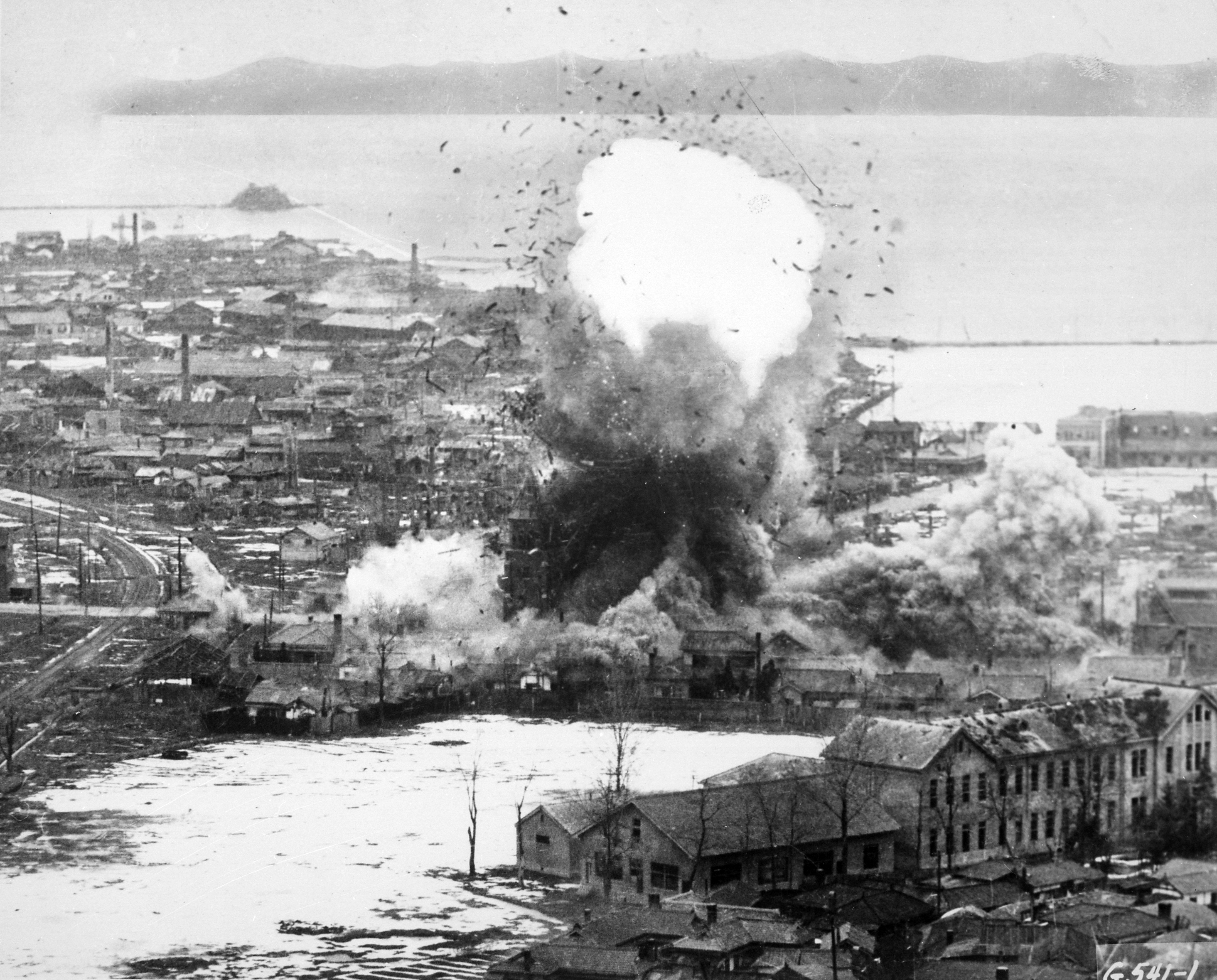
US planes bombing Wonsan, North Korea, 1951

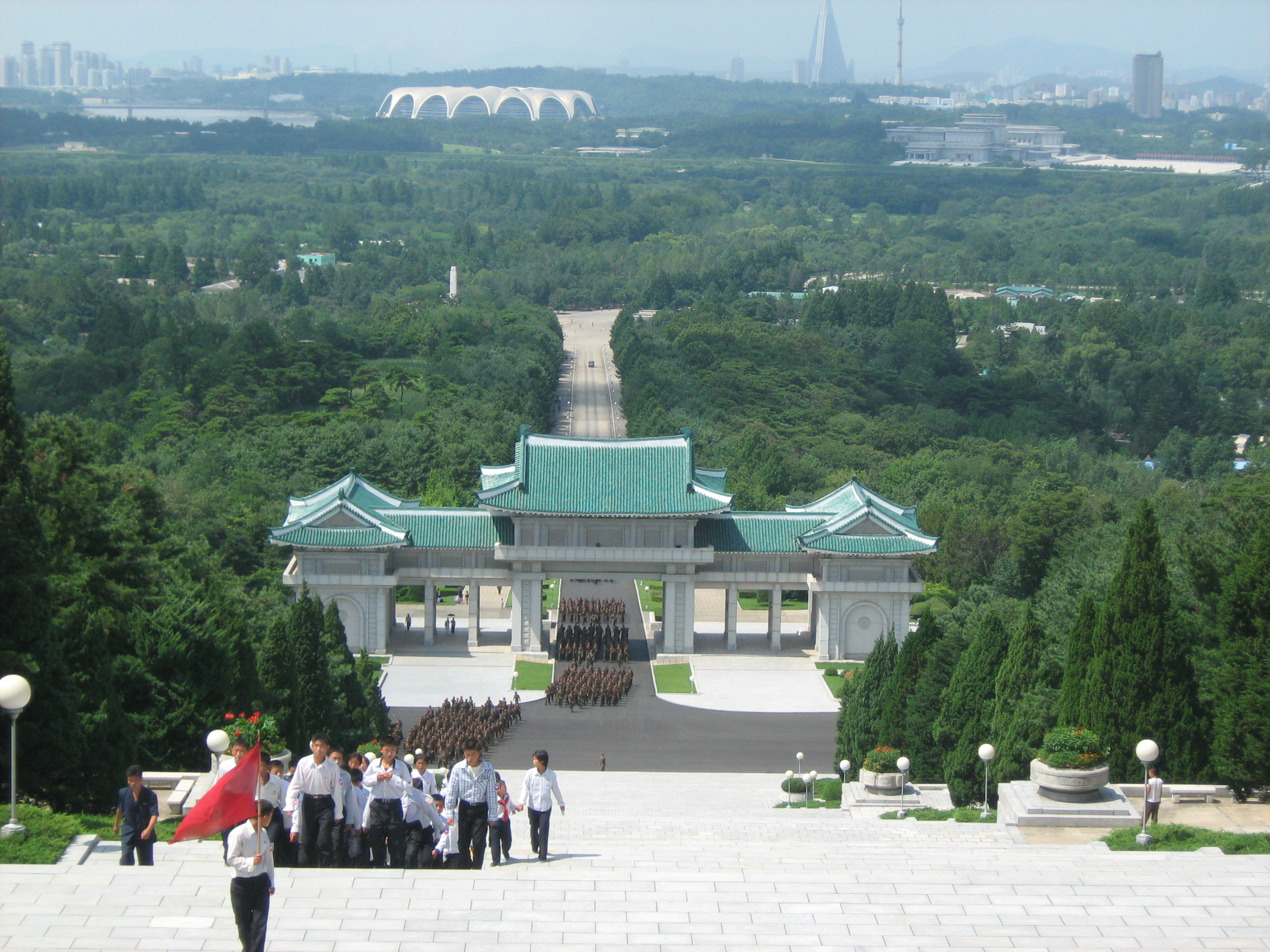
2012 rehearsal in Pyongyang for Victory Day, marking the end of the war

The consolidation of Syngman Rhee's government in the South with American military support and the suppression of the October 1948 insurrection ended North Korean hopes that a revolution in the South could reunify Korea, and from early 1949 Kim Il Sung sought Soviet and Chinese support for a military campaign to reunify the country by force. The withdrawal of most U.S. forces from South Korea in June 1949 left the southern government defended only by a weak and inexperienced South Korean army. The southern régime also had to deal with a citizenry of uncertain loyalty. The North Korean army, by contrast, had benefited from the Soviet Union's WWII-era equipment, and had a core of hardened veterans who had fought either as anti-Japanese guerrillas or alongside the Chinese Communists. In 1949 and 1950, Kim traveled to Moscow with the South Korean Communist leader Pak Hon-yong to raise support for a war of reunification.

Initially Joseph Stalin rejected Kim Il Sung's requests for permission to invade the South, but in late 1949 the Communist victory in China and the development of Soviet nuclear weapons made him re-consider Kim's proposal. In January 1950, after China's Mao Zedong indicated that the People's Republic of China would send troops and other support to Kim, Stalin approved an invasion. The Soviets provided limited support in the form of advisers who helped the North Koreans as they planned the operation, and Soviet military instructors to train some of the Korean units. However, from the very beginning Stalin made it clear that the Soviet Union would avoid a direct confrontation with the U.S. over Korea and would not commit ground forces even in case of major military crisis. The stage was set for a civil war between the two rival governments on the Korean peninsula. For over a year before the outbreak of war, the two sides had engaged in a series of bloody clashes along the 38th parallel, especially in the Ongjin area on the west coast. On 25 June 1950, claiming to be responding to a South Korean assault on Ongjin, the Northern forces launched an amphibious offensive all along the parallel. Due to a combination of surprise and military superiority, the Northern forces quickly captured the capital Seoul, forcing Syngman Rhee and his government to flee. By mid-July North Korean troops had overwhelmed the South Korean and allied American units and forced them back to a defensive line in south-east South Korea known as the Pusan Perimeter. During its brief occupation of southern Korea, the DPRK regime initiated radical social change, which included the nationalisation of industry, land reform, and the restoration of the People's Committees. According to the captured US General William F. Dean, "the civilian attitude seemed to vary between enthusiasm and passive acceptance".

The United Nations condemned North Korea's actions and approved an American-led intervention force to defend South Korea. In September, UN forces landed at Inchon and retook Seoul. Under the leadership of US General Douglas MacArthur, UN forces pushed north, reaching the Chinese border. According to Bruce Cumings, the North Korean forces were not routed, but managed a strategic retreat into the mountainous interior and into neighboring Manchuria. Kim Il Sung's government re-established itself in a stronghold in Chagang Province. In late November, Chinese forces entered the war and pushed the UN forces back, retaking Pyongyang in December 1950 and Seoul in January 1951. According to American historian Bruce Cumings, the Korean People's Army played an equal part in this counterattack. UN forces managed to retake Seoul for South Korea. The war essentially became a bloody stalemate for the next two years. American bombing included the use of napalm against populated areas and the destruction of dams and dykes, which caused devastating floods. China and North Korea also alleged the US was deploying biological weapons. As a result of the bombing, almost every substantial building and much of the infrastructure in North Korea was destroyed. The North Koreans responded by building homes, schools, hospitals, and factories underground. Economic output in 1953 had fallen by 75-90% compared with 1949.

While the bombing continued, armistice negotiations, which had commenced in July 1951, wore on. North Korea's lead negotiator was General Nam Il. The Korean Armistice Agreement was signed on 27 July 1953. A ceasefire followed, but there was no peace treaty, and hostilities continued at a lower intensity.

== Post-war redevelopment (1953–1970s) ==
=== Internal politics ===
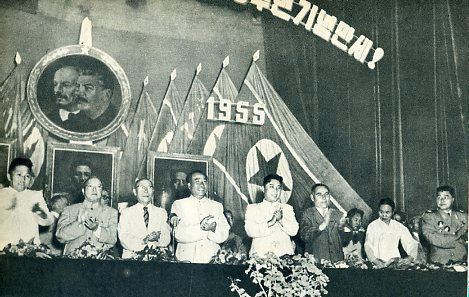
From left to right: Pak Chang-ok, Li Jishen, Kim Tu-bong, Zhu De, Kim Il Sung, Averky Aristov, Pak Chŏng Ae and Choe Yong-gon in 1955

Kim began gradually consolidating his power. Up to this time, North Korean politics were represented by four factions: the Yan'an faction, made up of returnees from China; the "Soviet Koreans" who were ethnic Koreans from the USSR; native Korean communists led by Pak Hon-yong; and Kim's Kapsan group who had fought guerrilla actions against Japan in the 1930s.

Pak Hon-yong, party vice chairman and Foreign Minister of the DPRK, was blamed for the failure of the southern population to support North Korea during the war, was dismissed from his positions in 1953, and was executed after a show trial in 1955.

The Party Congress in 1956 indicated the transformation that the party had undergone. Most members of other factions had lost their positions of influence. More than half the delegates had joined after 1950, most were under 40 years old, and most had limited formal education.

In February 1956, Soviet leader Nikita Khrushchev made a sweeping denunciation of Stalin, which sent shock waves throughout the Communist world. Encouraged by this, members of the party leadership in North Korea began to criticize Kim's dictatorial leadership, personality cult, and Stalinist economic policies. Kim consequently purged them in the August Faction Incident. By 1960, 70 per cent of the members of the 1956 Central Committee were no longer in politics.

Kim Il Sung had initially been criticized by the Soviets during a previous 1955 visit to Moscow for practicing Stalinism and a cult of personality, which was already growing enormous. The Korean ambassador to the USSR, Li Sangjo, a member of the Yan'an faction, reported that it had become a criminal offense to so much as write on Kim's picture in a newspaper and that he had been elevated to the status of Marx, Lenin, Mao, and Stalin in the communist pantheon. He also charged Kim with rewriting history to appear as if his guerrilla faction had single-handedly liberated Korea from the Japanese, completely ignoring the assistance of the Chinese People's Volunteers. In addition, Li stated that in the process of agricultural collectivization, grain was being forcibly confiscated from the peasants, leading to "at least 300 suicides" and that Kim made nearly all major policy decisions and appointments himself. Li reported that over 30,000 people were in prison for completely unjust and arbitrary reasons as trivial as not printing Kim Il Sung's portrait on sufficient quality paper or using newspapers with his picture to wrap parcels. Grain confiscation and tax collection were also conducted forcibly with violence, beatings, and imprisonment.

In late 1968, known military opponents of North Korea's Juche (or self-reliance) ideology such as Kim Chang-bong (minister of National Security), Huh Bong-hak (chief of the Division for Southern Intelligence) and Lee Young-ho (commander in chief of the DPRK Navy) were purged as anti-party/counter-revolutionary elements, despite their credentials as anti-Japanese guerrilla fighters in the past.

Kim's personality cult was modeled on Stalinism and his regime originally acknowledged Stalin as the supreme leader. After Stalin's death in 1953, however, Kim was described as the "Great Leader" or "Suryong". As his personality cult grew, the doctrine of Juche began to displace Marxism–Leninism. At the same time the cult extended beyond Kim himself to include his family in a revolutionary blood line. In 1972, to celebrate Kim Il Sung's birthday, the Mansu Hill Grand Monument was unveiled, including a 22-meter bronze statue of him.

=== International relations ===
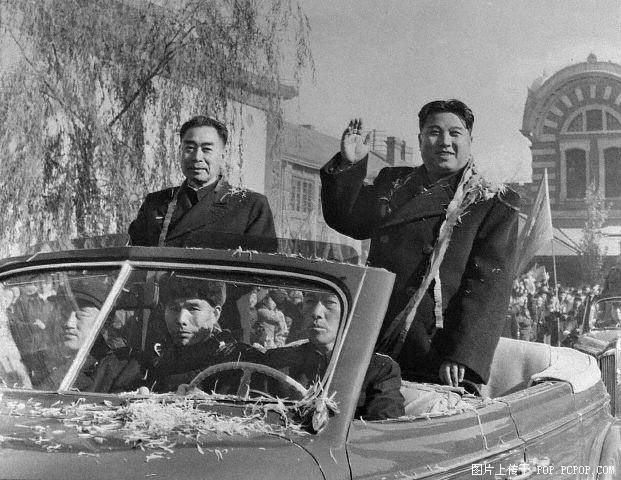
Kim Il Sung and Zhou Enlai tour Beijing in 1958

Like Mao in China, Kim Il Sung refused to accept Khrushchev's denunciation of Stalin and continued to model his regime on Stalinist norms. At the same time, he increasingly stressed Korean independence, as embodied in the concept of Juche. Kim told Alexei Kosygin in 1965 that he was not anyone's puppet and "We ... implement the purest Marxism and condemn as false both the Chinese admixtures and the errors of the CPSU".

Relations with China had worsened during the war. Mao Zedong criticized Kim for having started the whole "idiotic war" and for being an incompetent military commander who should have been removed from power. PLA commander Peng Dehuai was equally contemptuous of Kim's skills at waging war.

By some analysis, Kim Il Sung remained in power partially because the Soviets turned their attention to the Hungarian Revolution of 1956 that fall. The Soviets and Chinese were unable to stop the inevitable purge of Kim's domestic opponents or his move towards a one-man Stalinist autocracy and relations with both countries deteriorated in the former's case because of the elimination of the pro-Soviet Koreans and the latter because of the regime's refusal to acknowledge Chinese assistance in either liberation from the Japanese or the war in 1950–1953.

Beginning in the late 1950s, North Korea and China began renegotiating their border, culminating in the 1962 Sino–North Korean Border Treaty and a 1964 companion that established the modern border between the two countries.

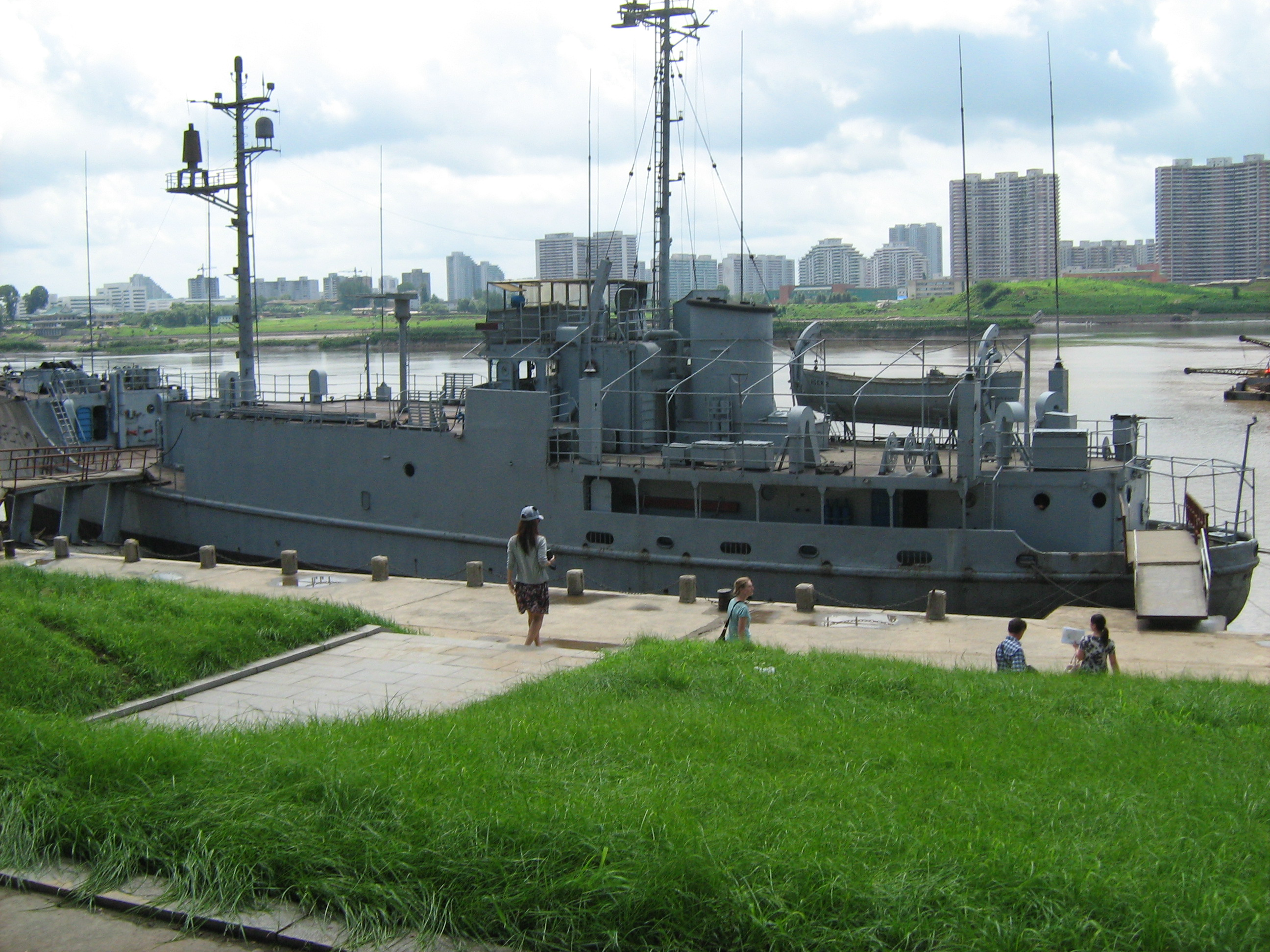
The captured USS Pueblo being visited by tourists in Pyongyang

Tensions between North and South escalated in the late 1960s with a series of low-level armed clashes known as the Korean DMZ Conflict. In 1966, Kim declared "liberation of the south" to be a "national duty". In 1968, North Korean commandos launched the Blue House Raid, an unsuccessful attempt to assassinate the South Korean President Park Chung Hee. Shortly after, the US spy ship Pueblo was captured by the North Korean navy. The crew were held captive throughout the year despite American protests that the vessel was in international waters, and they were finally released in December after a formal US apology was issued. In April 1969 a North Korean fighter jet shot down an EC-121 aircraft, killing all 31 crewmen on board. The Nixon administration found itself unable to react at all, since the US was heavily committed in the Vietnam War and had no troops to spare if the situation in Korea escalated. However, the Pueblo capture and EC-121 shootdown did not find approval in Moscow, as the Soviet Union did not want a second major war to erupt in Asia. China's response to the USS Pueblo crisis is less clear.

After Khrushchev was replaced by Leonid Brezhnev as Soviet Leader in 1964, and with the incentive of Soviet aid, North Korea strengthened its ties with the USSR. Kim condemned China's Cultural Revolution as "unbelievable idiocy". In turn, China's Red Guards labelled him a "fat revisionist".

In 1972, the first formal summit meeting between Pyongyang and Seoul was held, but the cautious talks did not lead to a lasting change in the relationship.

With the fall of South Vietnam to the North Vietnamese on 30 April 1975, Kim Il Sung felt that the US had shown its weakness and that reunification of Korea under his regime was possible. Kim visited Beijing in May 1975 in the hope of gaining political and military support for this plan to invade South Korea again, but Mao Zedong refused. Despite public proclamations of support, Mao privately told Kim that China would be unable to assist North Korea because of the lingering after-effects of the Cultural Revolution throughout China, and because Mao had recently decided to restore diplomatic relations with the US.

Meanwhile, North Korea emphasized its independent orientation by joining the Non-Aligned Movement in 1975. It promoted Juche as a model for developing countries to follow. It developed strong ties with the regimes of Bokassa in the Central African Republic, Macias Nguema in Equatorial Guinea, Idi Amin in Uganda, Pol Pot in Cambodia, Gaddafi in Libya, and Ceausescu in Romania.

=== Economic development ===
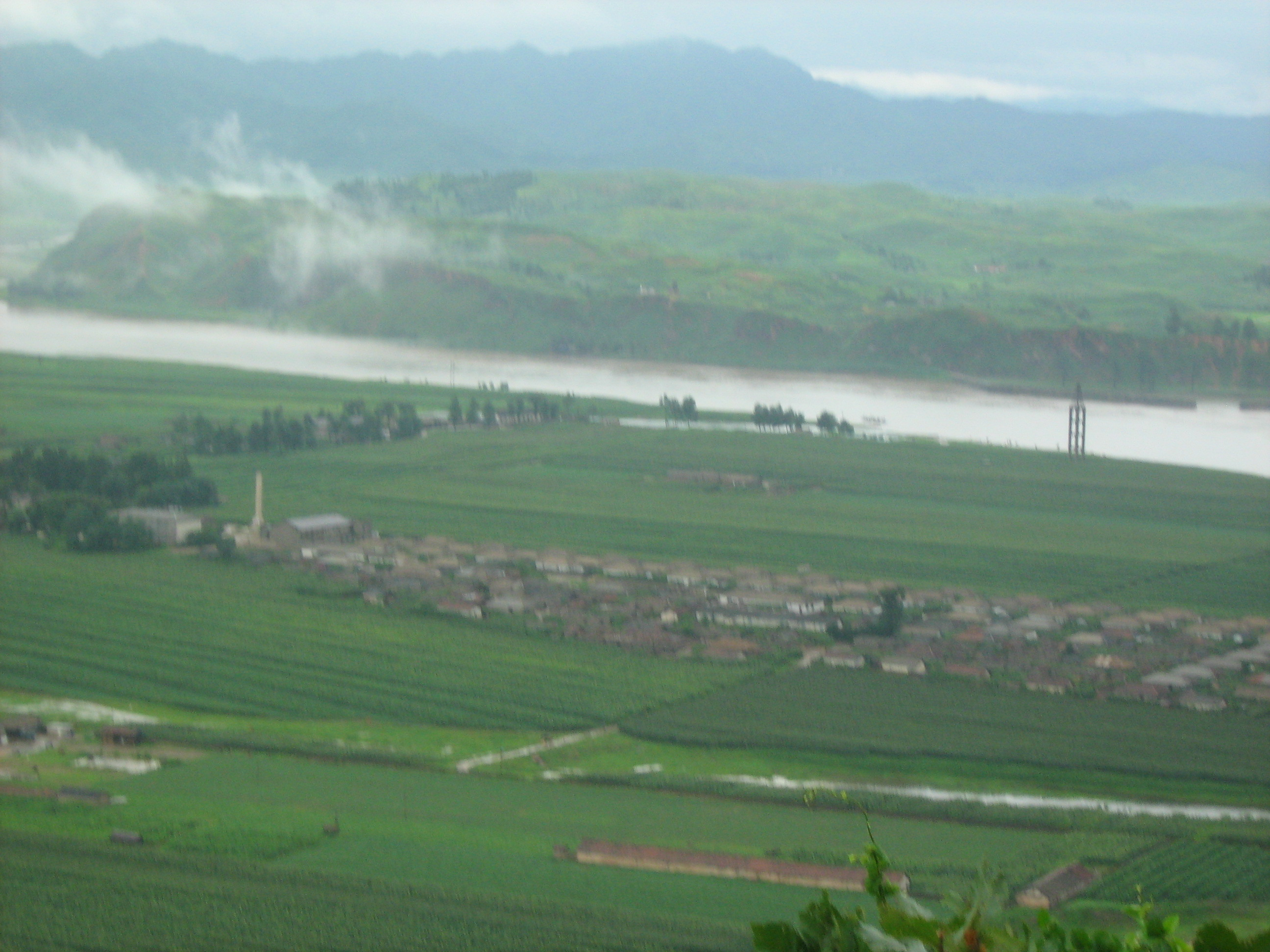
North Korean village in the Yalu River delta

Reconstruction of the country after the war proceeded with extensive Chinese and Soviet assistance. Koreans with experience in Japanese industries also played a significant part. Land was collectivized between 1953 and 1958. Many landlords had been eliminated by the earlier reforms or during the war.

Recovery from the war was slowed by a massive famine in 1954–55. Local officials had exaggerated the size of the harvest by 50–70%. After the central government took its share, starvation threatened many peasants; about 800,000 died. In addition collectivization was resisted; many farmers killed their livestock rather than turn them over to the collective farm.

Although developmental debates took place within the Workers' Party of Korea in the 1950s, North Korea, like all the postwar communist states, undertook massive state investment in heavy industry, state infrastructure and military strength, neglecting the production of consumer goods.

The first Three Year Plan (1954–1956) introduced the concept of Juche or self-reliance. The first Five Year Plan (1957–1961) consolidated the collectivization of agriculture and initiated mass mobilizations campaigns: the Chollima Movement, the Chongsan-ni system in agriculture and the Taean Work System in industry. The Chollima Movement was influenced by China's Great Leap Forward, but did not have its disastrous results. Industry was fully nationalized by 1959. Taxation on agricultural income was abolished in 1966.

North Korea was placed on a semi-war footing, with equal emphasis being given to the civilian and military economies. This was expressed in the 1962 Party Plenum by the slogan, "Arms in one hand and a hammer and sickle in the other! " At a special party conference in 1966, members of the leadership who opposed the military build-up were removed.

On the ruins left by the war, North Korea had built an industrialized command economy. The regime reached out to the Third World in the hope of developing strong trade relations. Che Guevara, then a Cuban government minister, visited North Korea in 1960, and proclaimed it a model for Cuba to follow. In 1965, the British economist Joan Robinson described North Korea's economic development as a "miracle". As late as the 1970s, its GDP per capita was estimated to be equivalent to South Korea's. By 1968, all homes had electricity, though the supply was unreliable. By 1972, all children from age 5 to 16 were enrolled in school, and over 200 universities and specialized colleges had been established. By the early 1980s, 60–70% of the population was urbanized.

== Later years of Kim Il Sung (1970s–1994) ==
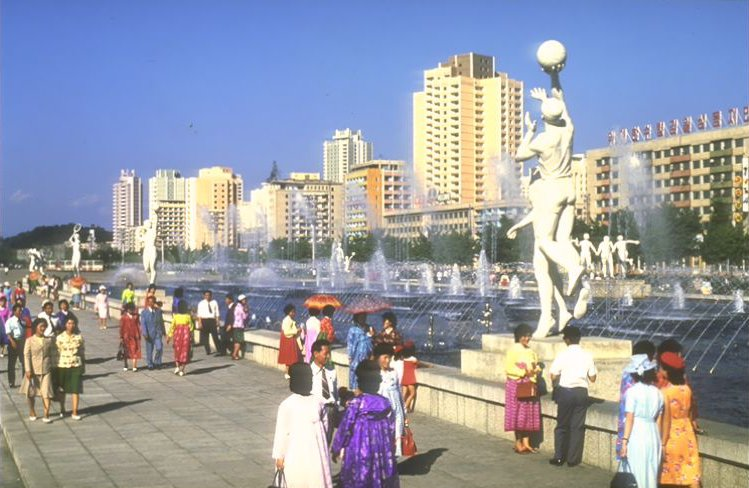
Pyongyang in 1989

In the 1970s, expansion of North Korea's economy, with the accompanying rise in living standards, came to an end. Compounding this was a decision to borrow foreign capital and invest heavily in military industries. North Korea's desire to lessen its dependence on aid from China and the Soviet Union prompted the expansion of its military power, which had begun in the second half of the 1960s. The government believed such expenditures could be covered by foreign borrowing and increased sales of its mineral wealth in the international market. North Korea invested heavily in its mining industries and purchased a large quantity of mineral extraction infrastructure from abroad. It also purchased entire petrochemical, textile, concrete, steel, pulp and paper manufacturing plants from the developed capitalist world. This included a Japanese-Danish venture that provided North Korea with the largest cement factory in the world. However, following the worldwide 1973 oil crisis, international prices for many of North Korea's native minerals fell, leaving the country with large debts and an inability to pay them off and still provide a high level of social welfare to its people. North Korea began to default in 1974 and halted almost all repayments in 1985. As a result, it was unable to pay for foreign technology.

By the mid to late 1970s some parts of the capitalist world, including South Korea, were creating new industries based around computers, electronics, and other advanced technology in contrast to North Korea's Stalinist economy of mining and steel production. Migration to urban areas stalled.

In October 1980, Kim Jong Il was introduced to the public at the Sixth Party Congress as the successor to Kim Il Sung. In 1972, Kim Jong Il had established himself as a leading theoretician with the publication of On the Juche Idea. and in 1974, he had been officially confirmed as his father's successor.

In 1983, North Korea carried out the Rangoon bombing, a failed assassination attempt against South Korean President Chun Doo-hwan while he was visiting Burma. This attack on neutral soil led many Third World countries to reconsider their diplomatic ties with North Korea.

In 1984, Kim visited Moscow during a grand tour of the USSR where he met Soviet leader Konstantin Chernenko. Kim also made public visits to East Germany, Czechoslovakia, Poland, Hungary, Romania, Bulgaria and Yugoslavia. Soviet involvement in the North Korean economy increased, until 1988 when bilateral trade peaked at US$2.8 billion (equivalent to $4.709×10^{9} in 2025). In 1986, Kim met the incoming Soviet leader Mikhail Gorbachev in Moscow and received a pledge of support.

The bombing of Korean Air Flight 858 in 1987, in the lead up to the Seoul Olympics, led to the US government placing North Korea on its list of terrorist countries.

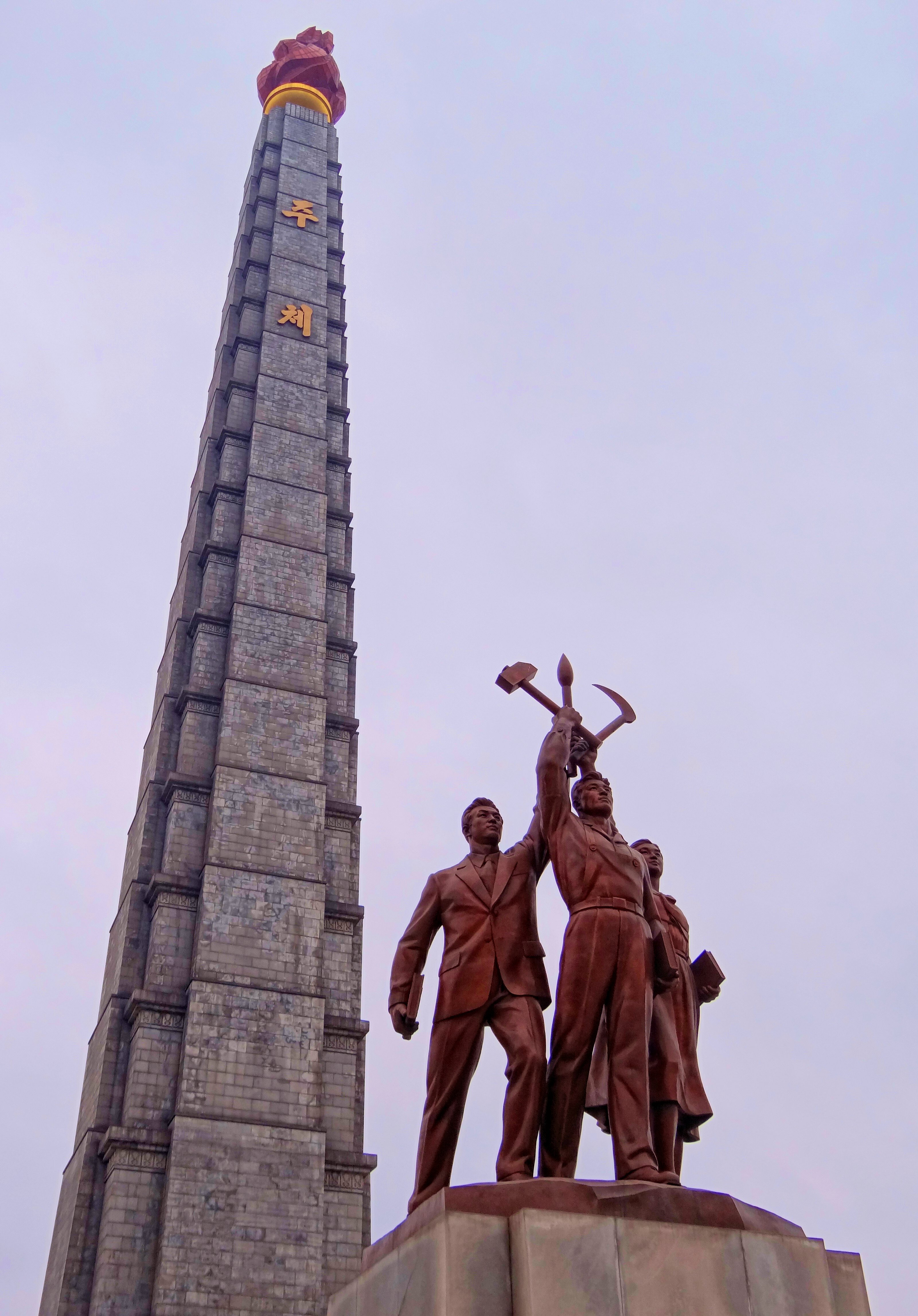
Up-close view of the Juche Tower and the accompanying monument to the Workers' Party of Korea

Despite the emerging economic problems, the regime invested heavily in prestigious projects, such as the Juche Tower, the Nampo Dam, and the Ryugyong Hotel. In 1989, as a response to the 1988 Seoul Olympics, it held the 13th World Festival of Youth and Students in Pyongyang. In fact, the grandiosity associated with the regime and its personality cult, as expressed in monuments, museums, and events, has been identified as a factor in the economic decline.

However, Gorbachev's reforms and diplomatic initiatives, the Chinese economic reforms starting in 1979, and the collapse of the Eastern Bloc from 1989 to 1991 increased North Korea's isolation. The leadership in Pyongyang responded by proclaiming that the collapse of the Eastern Bloc communist governments demonstrated the correctness of the policy of Juche.

The collapse of the Soviet Union in 1991 deprived North Korea of its main source of economic aid, leaving China as the isolated regime's only major ally. Without Soviet aid, North Korea's economy went into a free-fall. By this time, in the early 1990s, Kim Jong Il was already conducting most of the day-to-day activities of running of the state, being appointed Supreme Commander of the Korean Peoples' Army in December 1991 and Chairman of the National Defence Commission in 1993. Meanwhile, international tensions were rising over North Korea's quest for nuclear weapons. Former US president Jimmy Carter made a visit to Pyongyang in June 1994 in which he met with Kim, and returned proclaiming that he had resolved the crisis.

== Era of Kim Jong Il (1994–2011) ==
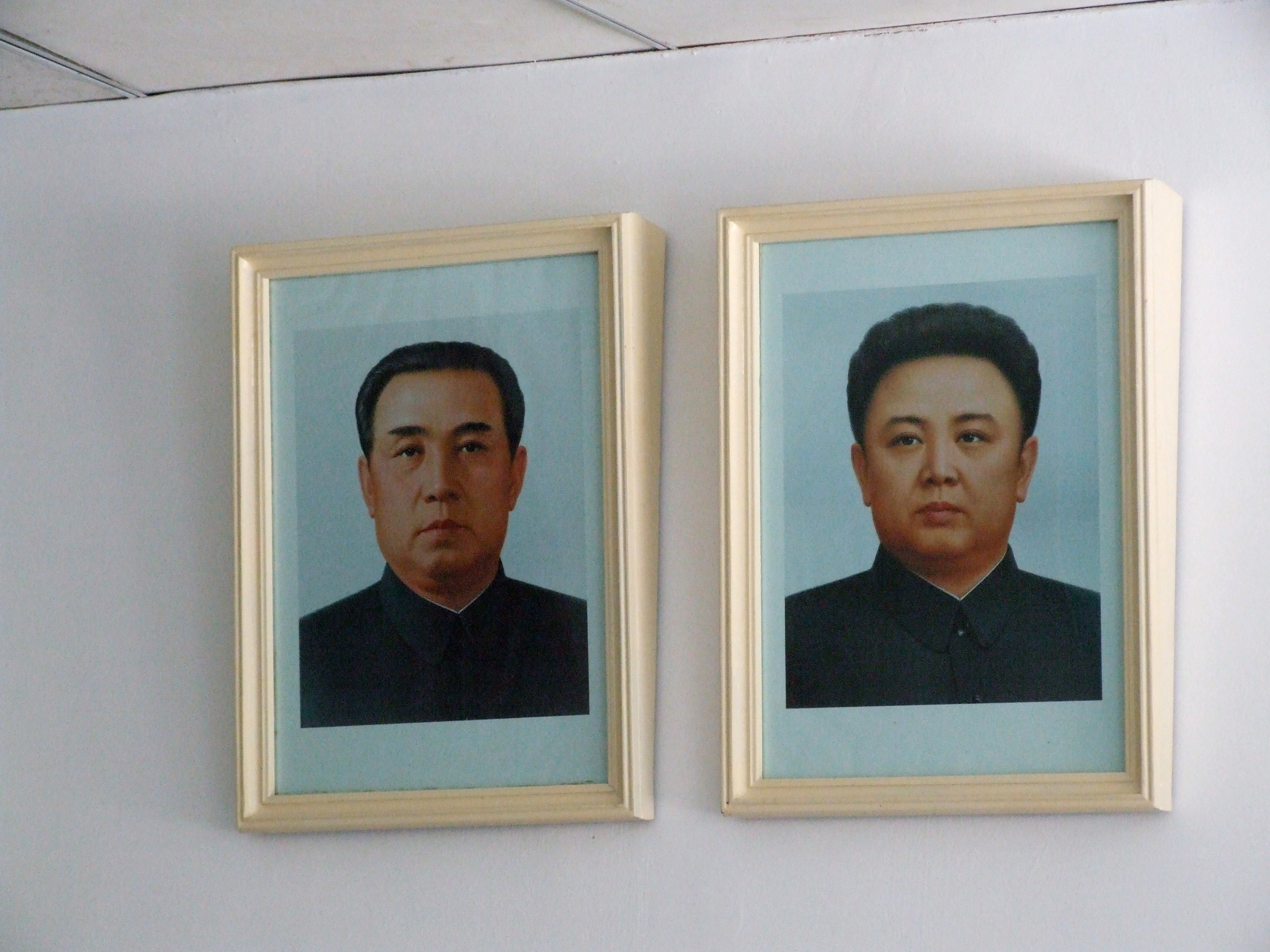
Portraits of Kim Il Sung and his son and successor Kim Jong Il

Kim Il Sung died from a sudden heart attack on 8 July 1994. The politics in the last years of Kim Il Sung closely resemble those of the beginning of the Kim Jong Il era.

Beginning as early as 1990, the economy began a steep decline. From 1990 to 1995, foreign trade was cut in half, with the loss of subsidized Soviet oil being particularly keenly felt. The crisis came to a head in 1995 with widespread flooding that destroyed crops and infrastructure, leading to a famine that lasted until 1998. At the same time, there appeared to be little significant internal opposition to the regime. A great many of the North Koreans fleeing to China because of famine still showed significant support for the government as well as pride in their homeland. Many of these people reportedly returned to North Korea after earning sufficient money.

In September 1998, Kim Il Sung was proclaimed "eternal President of the Republic" with the office of the presidency being abolished. According to Ashley J. Tellis and Michael Wills, this amendment was an indication of the unique North Korean characteristic of being a theocratic state based on the personality cult surrounding Kim Il Sung, granting leaders titles with "legal" power after their deaths. The functions and powers previously belonging to the President were divided between three officials: the head of government, the Premier of North Korea; the Chairman of the Supreme People's Assembly, the head of state, President of the Presidium of the Supreme People's Assembly; and the head of the military, the Chairman of the National Defence Commission and Supreme Commander of the Korean People's Army. Exercising his power through his militaristic posts, which he essentially controlled even whilst his father was still alive, with his elevation to the Supreme Commander of the KPA and Chairman of the NDC in the early 90s, Kim Jong Il placed emphasis on the military to boast and elevate his power. In addition to this, after the collapse of global Communism in the early 1990s and the economic crisis and mass famine that continued, North Korea found itself in a very precarious international position. In this sense, Songun is perceived as an aggressive, threatening move to increase the strength of the North Korean military at the expense of other parts of society.

In 1998, the government announced a new policy called "Songun", or "Military First". In essence, Songun politics gives great priority to military affairs and ensuring the Korean People's Army (KPA) as the main force in construction and development.

After his election in 1998, President Kim Dae-jung of South Korea actively attempted to reduce tensions between the two Koreas under the Sunshine Policy. After the election of George W. Bush as the President of the United States in 2000, North Korea faced renewed pressure over its nuclear program. On 9 October 2006, North Korea announced that it had successfully detonated a nuclear bomb underground. Additionally, North Korea was developing ICBMs.

On 13 February 2007, North Korea signed into an agreement with South Korea, the United States, Russia, China, and Japan, which stipulated North Korea would shut down its Yongbyon nuclear reactor in exchange for economic and energy assistance. However, in 2009 the North continued its nuclear test program.

In 2010, the sinking of a South Korean naval ship, the Cheonan, allegedly by a North Korean torpedo, and North Korea's shelling of Yeonpyeong Island escalated tensions between North and South.

== Era of Kim Jong Un (2011–present) ==
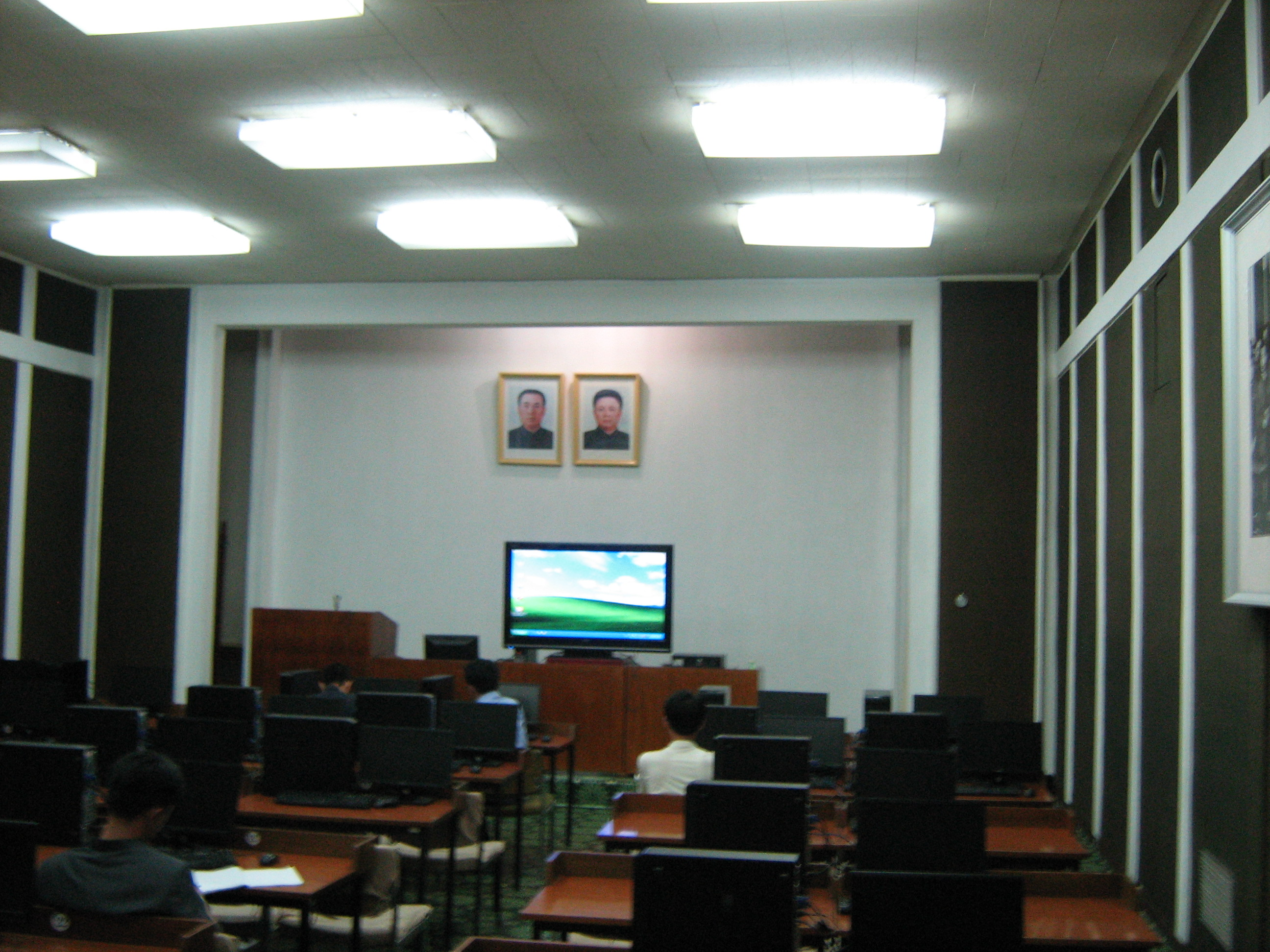
A computer lab classroom in the Grand People's Study House, Pyongyang, 2012

Kim Jong Il died on 17 December 2011 and was succeeded by his son, Kim Jong Un. In late 2013, Kim Jong Un's uncle Jang Song-thaek was arrested and executed after a trial. According to the South Korean spy agency, Kim may have purged some 300 people after taking power. In 2014, the United Nations Commission of Inquiry accused the government of crimes against humanity.

In 2015, North Korea adopted Pyongyang Standard Time (UTC+08.30); previously they had used Japan Standard Time (UTC+9.00), imposed by the Japanese Empire when it annexed Korea. As a result, North Korea was in a different time zone to South Korea. In 2016, the 7th Congress of the Workers' Party of Korea was held in Pyongyang, the first party congress since 1980. The mid-term economic development plan was announced for the first time in 24 years.

In 2017, North Korea tested the Hwasong-15, an intercontinental ballistic missile capable of striking anywhere in the United States of America. Estimates of North Korea's nuclear arsenal at that time ranged between 15 and 60 bombs, probably including hydrogen bombs.

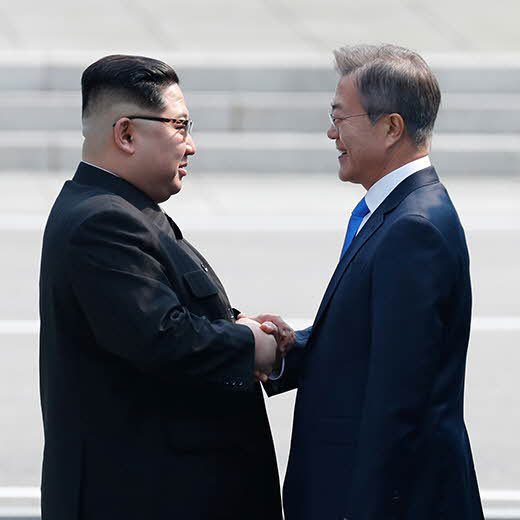
Kim and Moon meet at the DMZ in 2018

In February 2018, North Korea sent an unprecedented high-level delegation to the Winter Olympics in South Korea, headed by Kim Yo Jong, sister of Kim Jong Un, and President Kim Yong-nam, which passed on an invitation to South Korean President Moon to visit the North. In April the two Korean leaders met at the Joint Security Area where they announced their governments would work towards a denuclearized Korean Peninsula and formalize peace between the two states. North Korea announced it would change its time zone to realign with the South.

On 12 June 2018, Kim met American President Donald Trump at a summit in Singapore and signed a declaration, again affirming a commitment to peace and denuclearization. Trump announced that he would halt military exercises with South Korea and foreshadowed withdrawing American troops entirely. In September, South Korean President Moon visited Pyongyang for a summit with Kim. In February 2019 in Hanoi, a second summit between Kim and Trump broke down without an agreement. On 30 June 2019, Trump, Moon, and Kim met at the DMZ. Talks in Stockholm began in October between US and North Korean negotiating teams, but broke down after one day.

Starting in January 2020, the North Korean government took extensive measures to block the spread of the COVID-19 pandemic, including quarantines and travel restrictions. In April, the US analyst website 38 North said this appeared to have been successful. The 8th Congress of the Workers' Party of Korea, held in early January 2021, restored the operative functions of the General Secretary of the Workers' Party of Korea, a title previously awarded "eternally" to Kim Jong Il in 2012, and elected Kim Jong Un to it. In 2024 38 North reported that North Korea had had a "seemingly successful" response to the pandemic, but had not yet returned to normalcy.

On 30 December 2023, Kim Jong Un announced that unification with South Korea was no longer possible. One of the symbols of this was the destruction of the Arch of Reunification in Pyongyang on 23 January 2024. The separation from the Seoul was formalized in May 2026 when the country's constitution was amended, portraying South Korea as a "hostile state" and removing any tie to a shared heritage.

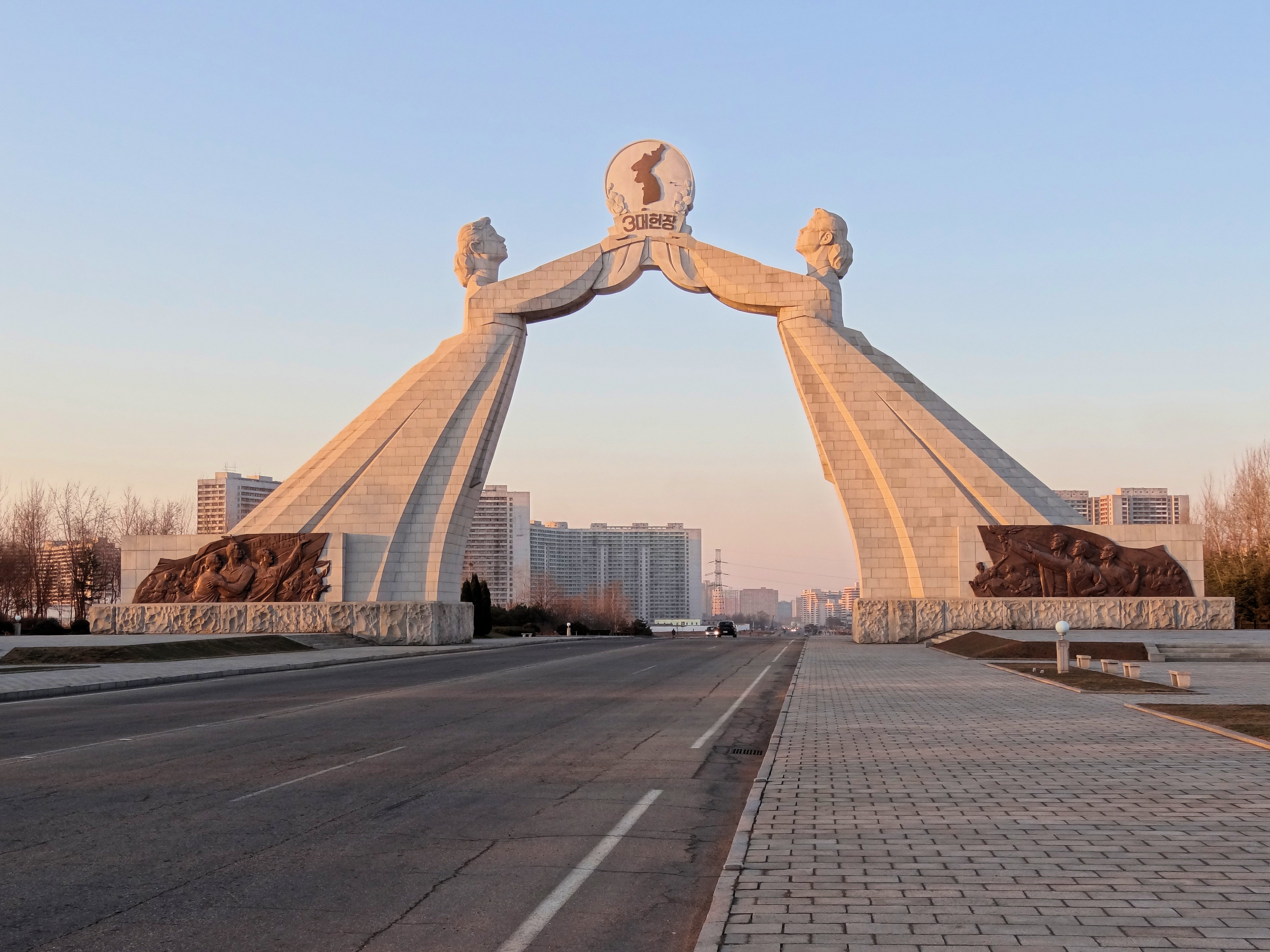
The Arch of Reunification, demolished 2024

== See also ==
- History of East Asia
- History of Korea
- Prehistoric Korea
- Korean independence movement
- Korean nationalist historiography
- Communism in Korea
- Korean conflict
- Government of North Korea
- Human rights in North Korea
- Politics of North Korea
- Songbun
- Supreme Leader (North Korean title)
- Women in the North Korean Revolution
- Assassination of Kim Jong-nam
