= 1946 North Korean local elections =

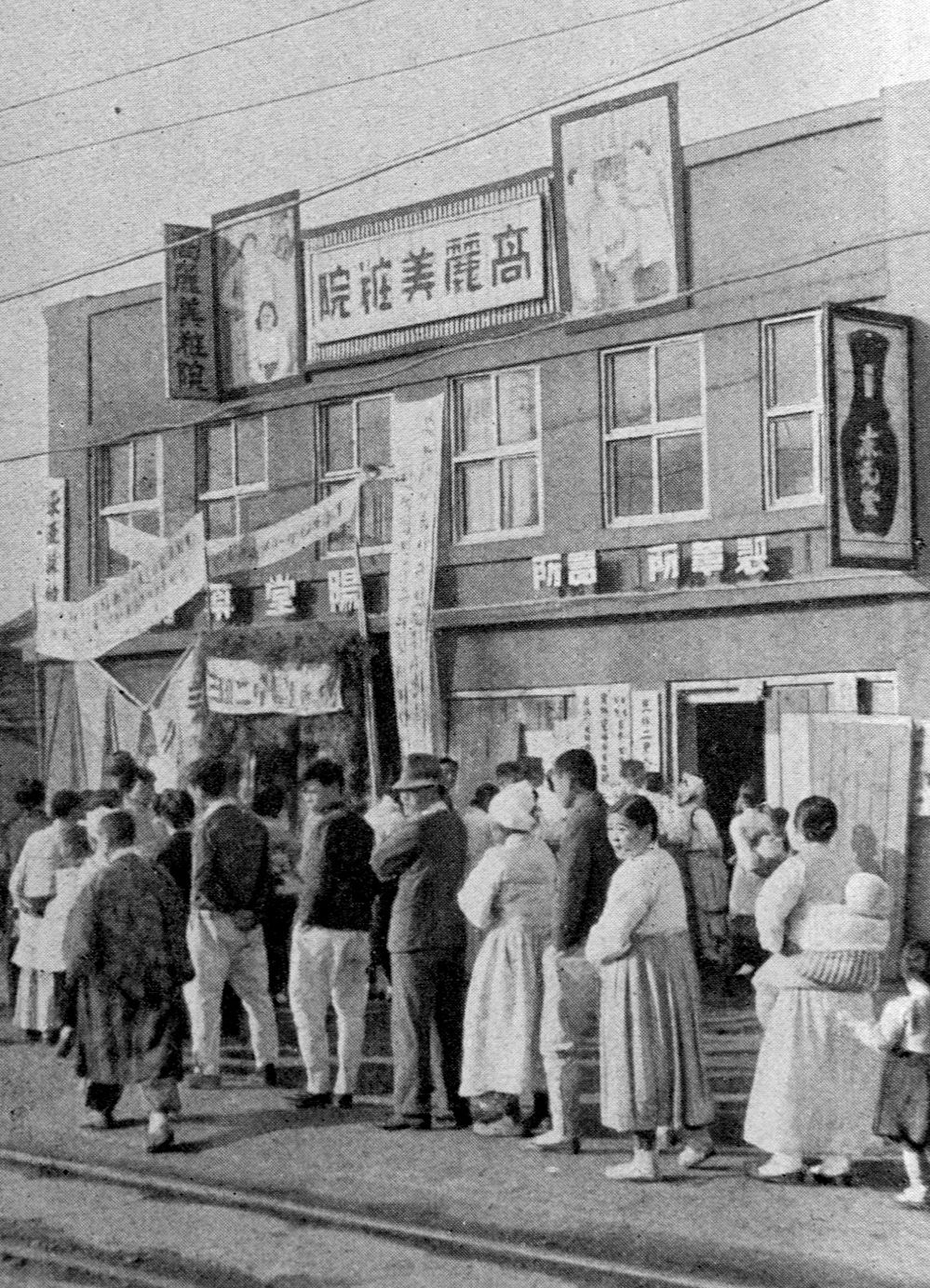
Pyongyang voters queuing in the local elections of North Korea of 3rd Nov. 1946.

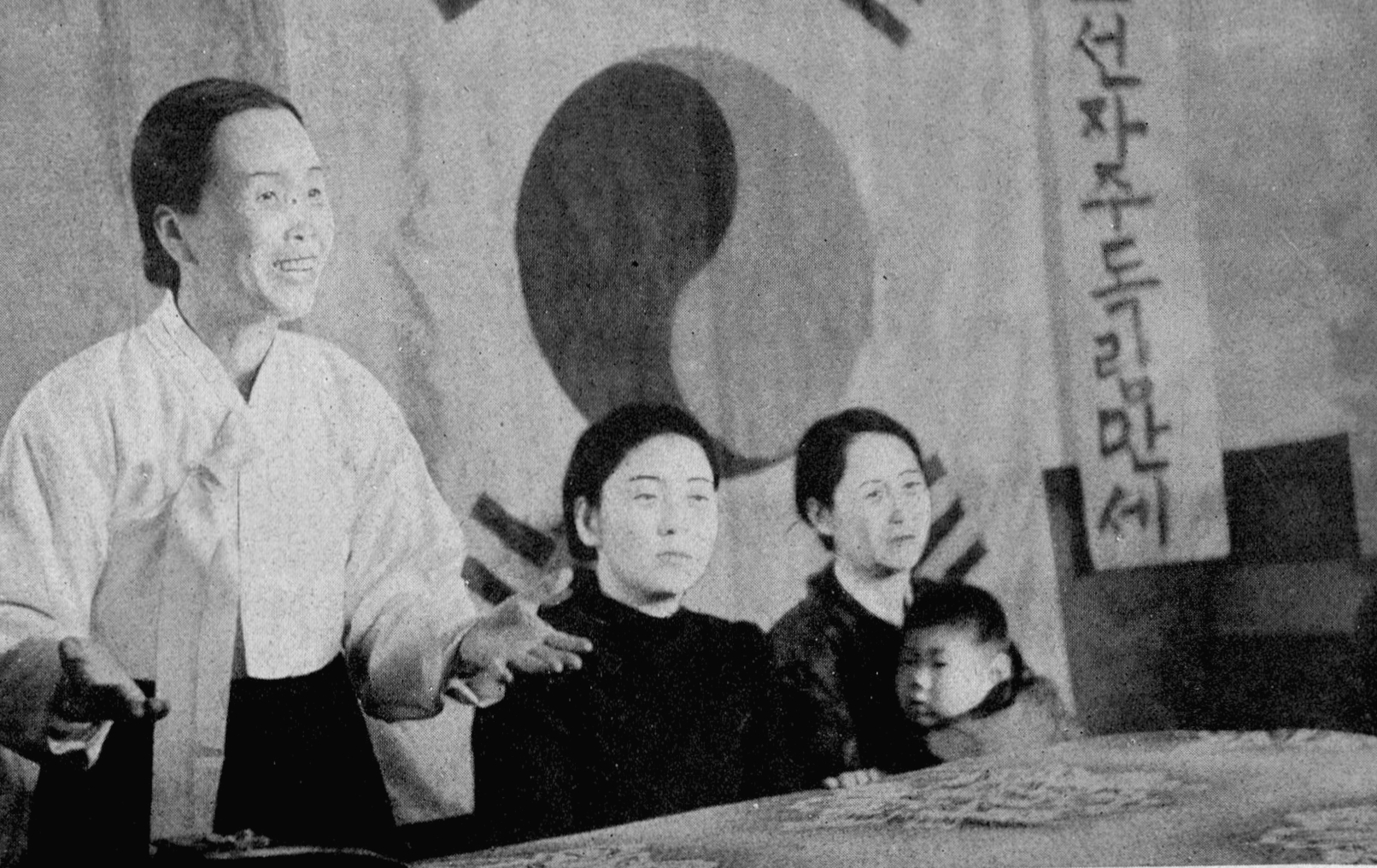
Pak Chong-ae, leader of the Korean Democratic Women's Union (조선민주녀성동맹, = North Korea Democratic Women's League), speaks at a rally for the local elections in North Korea held 3rd Nov. 1946.

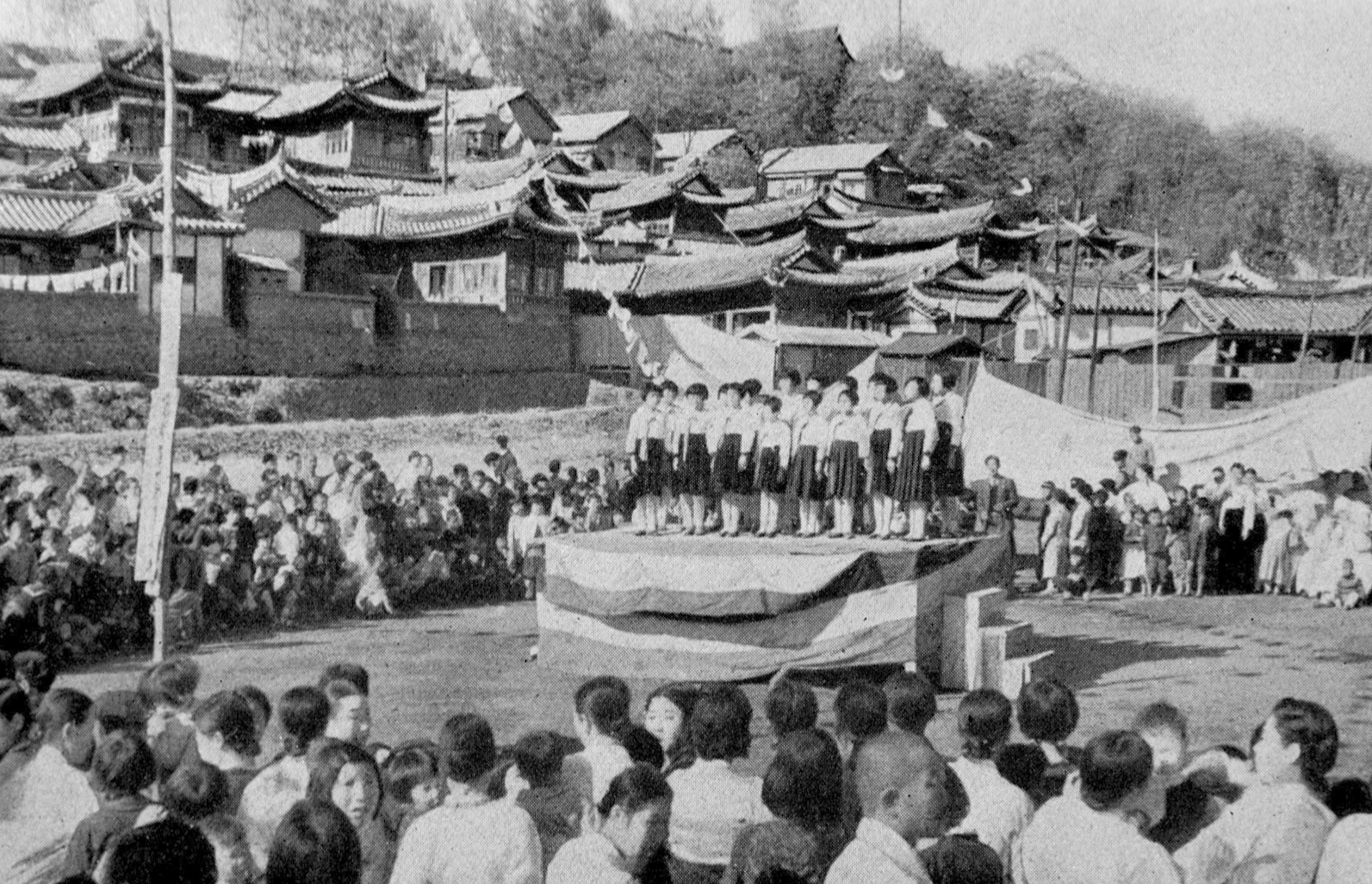
Pyongyang voters at a rally for the local elections of North Korea of 3rd Nov. 1946. School girls in uniform singing.

Elections of the provincial, city and county people's committees (도·시·군 인민위원회 선거) were held in Soviet-occupied North Korea on November 3, 1946.

The elections were held for the Pyongyang municipal people's committee (평양 특별시 인민위원회), six provincial people's committees, 12 city people's committees, and 90 county people's committees.

The total turnout for the election is 99.6%, with 97% of the total voters participating in the elections of the provincial people's committees, 95.4% in the elections of the city people's committees, and 96.9% in the elections of the county people's committees.

A total of 3,459 deputies were elected to the provincial, city and county people's committees, with 1,102 deputies being affiliated with the Workers' Party of North Korea, 351 with the Korean Democratic Party, 253 with the Chondoist Chongu Party, and 1,753 being independents.

Among the 3,459 deputies elected were 510 workers, 1,256 peasants, 1,056 office clerks, 145 merchants, 73 businessmen, 311 intellectuals, 94 religious people, and 14 former landlords. 453 of the 3,459 deputies were women. The country's future supreme leader, Kim Il Sung, was among those elected. He was elected from Samdung-myon (modern day Samdŭng-ri), Kangdong County in South Phyongan Province.

Party or alliance		Votes	%	Seats
Fatherland Front	Workers' Party of North Korea			1,102
Fatherland Front	Korean Democratic Party			351
Fatherland Front	Chondoist Chongu Party			253
Fatherland Front	Independents			1,753
Total				3,459
Registered voters/turnout			99.6	
