= Socialist Women's Union of Korea =

North Korean mass organization

- Flag
- Predecessor: North Korea Women's League
- Formation: 18 November 1945; 80 years ago
- Type: Mass organization
- Purpose: Women's rights
- Headquarters: Chungsŏng-dong, Central District, Pyongyang
- Region served: North Korea
- Members: 200,000–250,000 (2018 est.)
- Chairperson: Jon Hyang-sun
- Vice chairpersons: Cha Hyon-ok; Ri Hyang-suk; Ri Sun-ok; Ri Hae-im
- Main organ: Korean Woman

- Socialist Women's Union of Korea
- Chosŏn'gŭl: 조선사회주의녀성동맹
- Hancha: 朝鮮社會主義女性同盟
- Revised Romanization: Joseon Sahoejuui Nyeoseong Dongmaeng
- McCune–Reischauer: Chosŏn Sahoejuŭi Nyŏsŏng Tongmaeng

Formerly Korean Democratic Women's Union
- Chosŏn'gŭl: 조선민주녀성동맹
- Hancha: 朝鮮民主女性同盟
- Revised Romanization: Joseon Minju Nyeoseong Dongmaeng
- McCune–Reischauer: Chosŏn Minju Nyŏsŏng Tongmaeng

The Socialist Women's Union of Korea (Korean: 조선사회주의녀성동맹; formerly the Korean Democratic Women's Union, KDWU; (Note: Or Korean Democratic Women's League, KDWL) 조선민주녀성동맹) is a mass organization for women in North Korea. Founded in 1945, it is the oldest and one of the most important mass organizations in the country.

Membership has been restricted to those women who are not members of any other mass organization. As a result, Union members are effectively composed of women who do not work outside of home. The Union nominally represents these women, but in reality it is used for the implementation of government policies. In its early days after its foundation in 1945, the Union had well more than a million members, compared to its current membership of about 200,000 to 250,000. Its influence has been reduced since the economic reforms of the early 2000s.

The Union has committees on every level of administrative divisions of North Korea, from ri (village) all the way up to provinces. The post of the chairperson is usually conferred to one of the most powerful women in North Korea. Previous chairpersons include Kim Sung-ae, the wife of the country's former leader Kim Il Sung. The current chairperson is Jon Hyang-sun.

== History ==
The North Korean branch of the Union, the North Korea Democratic Women's League, (Note: McCune–Reischauer: Pukchosŏn minju yŏsŏng tongmaeng; hancha: 北朝鮮民主女性同盟) was established on 18 November 1945 as part of an effort by the North Korea Bureau of the Communist Party of Korea to enroll as many people as possible as members of communist-controlled mass organizations in the northern part of the Korean Peninsula. It was the first mass organization founded with a particular segment of the society in mind. Its initial task was to gather spontaneously formed regional women's organizations under its control. The Union held its first congress on 10 May 1946. At that time, it had 800,000 members in branches in 12 cities, 89 counties, and 616 townships. By the end of 1946, the League counted 1,030,000 members, or about one-fifth of women in the North.

At its inception, the Union worked to enact laws regarding equality of the sexes as well as to bring women into politics. When the North Korean local elections of 1946, the first democratic elections in the country, approached, many men opposed women running for People's Committee. In response, Kim Il Sung enhanced the role of the Union. Some of the political goals of the Union had to do with supporting the communists rather than specifically focusing on women's issues. The Union platform consisted of supporting the Provisional People's Committee for North Korea and Kim Il Sung for leadership of the country, as well as opposing "fascism", "traitors", feudal customs and superstition. Nominally, the Union represented the whole Peninsula but in reality it had little connections with women in the south.

By 1947, the Union had 1.5 million members. The vast majority of them, some 73 percent, were peasants while 5.3 percent were workers, 0.97 percent were intellectuals, and the remaining 20 percent included all others, such as housewives.

The North and South branches became merged on 20 April 1951. Official North Korean histories date the origins of the present organization to either December 1926 or January 1951, although both of these accounts are disputed. More recently, the Union has succeeded in increasing the number of women in manufacturing jobs. The early 2000s economic reforms, which allowed people to pursue profits, weakened the ideological reach of the Union, whose membership of housewives were now busy in the marketplace. Despite this, it remains one of the most important mass organizations in the country.

At the Union's Sixth Congress on 17–18 November 2016, the name was changed to the Socialist Women's Union of Korea.

== Organization ==
Membership is reserved for those who are not members of the Workers' Party of Korea or any other mass organization, which is the case for women who do not work outside their home. This feature of the Union makes it unique worldwide. This practice was adopted in the 1960s. Early on, membership was reserved to women between the ages of 18 and 61. Nowadays, women between the ages of 31 and 60 are eligible for membership, although if a woman marries and becomes a housewife, she is eligible regardless of age. Lately, even retirees have been forced to participate in its activities. Officially, the Union represents women who are not members in any other mass organizations, but in reality it is used to pass on decisions made by the government of North Korea and for political mobilization.

There is a committee affiliated with the Union for every administrative division of North Korea, all the way from ri (village) to province level. The Union has some 200,000–250,000 members. Under the Taean work system, there is a Union representative under the workplace Chief Secretary, who in turn is responsible to the workplace Party Committee.

The Central Committee of the Union holds plenary sessions twice a year. The Union was a member of the popular front Democratic Front for the Reunification of Korea.

The Union runs a publishing house, Chosŏn Yŏsŏngsa (조선녀성사), which, since September 1946, has published its organ Korean Woman. It started appearing regularly in 1947 and was published monthly until 1982 when publication became bimonthly.

=== Chairpersons ===
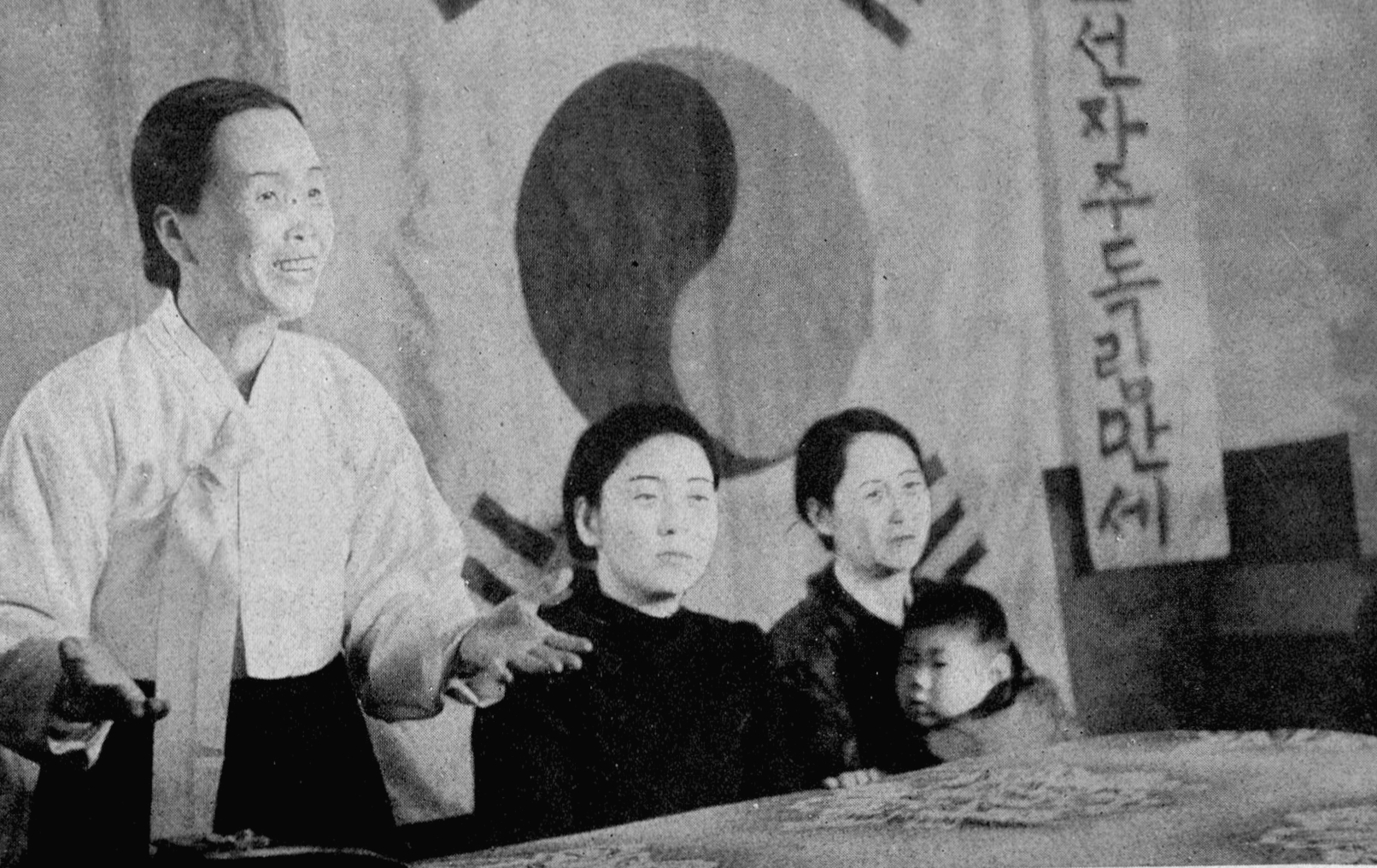
Pak Chong-ae, the first chairperson of the North Korean Central Committee of the Union speaks at a rally for the local elections in North Korea held 3rd Nov. 1946.

The post of the chairperson of the Union has traditionally been conferred to the most powerful woman in North Korea.

The first chairperson of the North Korean Central Committee of the Union was Pak Chong-ae. Its vice chairperson was Ahn Sin-ho. Under Pak, who served until 1965, the Union was not unlike women's organizations elsewhere in the world. It was only later that it attained totalitarian features.

Pak was followed by Kim Ok-sun, wife of the former guerrilla Choe Kwang. When her husband was purged in 1969, Kim was also deposed.

She was followed by Kim Sung-ae, the second wife of North Korean leader Kim Il Sung and former vice chairperson of the Union, in 1972. She gave the Union its current, totalitarian form. It is possible that she used her position to promote her sons Kim Pyong-il and Kim Yong-il to succeed Kim Il Sung, as opposed to Kim Jong Il from Kim Il Sung's first marriage. The Union lost much of its importance after Kim Jong Il managed to succeed his father, and Kim Sung-ae resigned her post on 25 April 1998.

It was thought that Kim Jong Il would appoint his own wife, Ko Yong-hui, following the precedent of his father, but this did not happen. Kim Sung-ae was followed by Chon Yon-ok. The current chairperson is Jang Chun-sil. Jang's predecessor since October 2000, was Pak Sun-hui (who is the daughter of Pak Chong-ae). The current vice chairpersons are Hong Son-ok, Jong Myong-hui, and Wang Ok-hwan. The vice director is Pak Chang-suk.

== See also ==
- All-China Women's Federation
- General Federation of Trade Unions of Korea
- Kimilsungist-Kimjongilist Youth League
- Politics of North Korea
- Workers' Party of Korea
- Women in North Korea
- Women in the North Korean Revolution
